= 1993 Cincinnati Bengals season =

NFL team season

- Head coach: Dave Shula
- Home stadium: Riverfront Stadium

Results
- Record: 3–13
- Division place: 4th AFC Central
- Playoffs: Did not qualify
- Pro Bowlers: None

The 1993 Cincinnati Bengals season was the team's 26th year in professional football and its 24th with the National Football League. This for the first time since 1979, Anthony Muñoz was not on the opening day roster and for the first time since 1983, Boomer Esiason was not on the opening day roster. The David Klingler experiment at starting quarterback got off to a poor start, as the Bengals lost their first ten games for the second of three 0–8 starts in four seasons.

The Bengals would finally get their first win against the Los Angeles Raiders 16–10, at Riverfront Stadium, but were the last winless team for the first of two consecutive years. This ignominy would not be suffered subsequently by any NFL franchise until division rivals the Cleveland Browns went 1–31 in 2016 and 2017. After dropping their next two games, the Bengals closed the season by winning twice before losing their closer to a disappointing Saints outfit to finish with their second 3–13 season in three years.

The late-season win over the Raiders was their first win against a team that finished with a winning record since the 1990–91 AFC Wild Card win over the Oilers (41–14, January 6, 1991). This was the only such regular-season win from 1991–1994 and would be the last such win until week 1 of 1995 (Indianapolis). The win was one of only four against teams with winning records in head coach David Shula's tenure with the team. The Bengals failed to win a single game on the road.

== Offseason ==
- March 17, 1993: The Cincinnati Bengals traded Boomer Esiason to the New York Jets.

=== NFL draft ===
1993 Cincinnati Bengals draft
Round	Pick	Player	Position	College	Notes
1	5	John Copeland	Defensive end	Alabama	
2	37	Tony McGee	Tight end	Michigan	
3	59	Steve Tovar	Linebacker	Ohio State	
3	63	Ty Parten	Defensive tackle	Arizona	
4	90	Marcello Simmons	Defensive back	SMU	
5	117	Forey Duckett	Defensive back	UNLV	
6	148	Tom Scott	Offensive tackle	East Carolina	
7	175	Lance Gunn	Defensive back	Texas	
8	202	Doug Pelfrey	Placekicker	Kentucky	
Made roster

== Personnel ==
=== Staff ===
1993 Cincinnati Bengals staff
Front office: President – John Sawyer; Vice President/General Manager – Mike Brown; Director of Player Personnel – Pete Brown; Head coaches: Head Coach – Dave Shula; Offensive coaches: Offensive Coordinator/Tight Ends – Mike Pope; Quarterbacks – Ken Anderson; Running Backs – Jim Anderson; Wide Receivers – Richard Williamson; Offensive Line – Jim McNally	Defensive coaches: Defensive Coordinator – Ron Lynn; Defensive Line – Bob Karmelowicz; Linebackers – Mike Haluchak; Defensive Backs – Ron Meeks; Special teams coaches: Special Teams – Marv Braden; Strength and conditioning: Strength – Kim Wood

=== Roster ===
1993 Cincinnati Bengals roster
Quarterbacks (QB): 7 David Klingler; 10 Jay Schroeder; 4 Erik Wilhelm; Running backs (RB): 42 Eric Ball KR; 21 Ryan Benjamin; 44 Derrick Fenner FB; 28 Harold Green; 36 Ostell Miles; 30 Ronald Williams; Wide receivers (WR): 86 Wesley Carroll; 80 Carl Pickens; 89 Jeff Query; 81 Patrick Robinson; Tight ends (TE): 47 David Frisch; 82 Tony McGee; 49 Jeff Thomason; 48 Craig Thompson	Offensive linemen (OL): 60 Chuck Bradley T; 72 Scott Brumfield G; 68 Donnell Johnson T; 66 Dan Jones T; 64 Bruce Kozerski C; 75 Jack Linn G; 73 Ken Moyer G/C; 61 Thomas Rayam G; 74 Tom Scott G/T; 63 Joe Walter T; Defensive linemen (DL): 92 John Copeland DE; 70 Artis Ford NT; 97 Mike Frier DE; 98 George Hinkle DE; 71 Garry Howe NT; 69 Tim Krumrie NT; 96 Danny Stubbs DE	Linebackers (LB): 50 James Francis OLB; 58 Alex Gordon OLB; 59 Karmeeleyah McGill OLB; 90 Eric Shaw ILB; 91 Brad Smith ILB; 51 Steve Tovar ILB; 94 Alfred Williams OLB; Defensive backs (DB): 43 Mike Brim CB; 32 Ron Carpenter FS; 24 Alan Grant CB; 25 Rod Jones CB; 30 R. J. Kors SS; 22 Marcello Simmons CB; 34 Fernandus Vinson SS; 37 Leonard Wheeler CB; 31 Darryl Williams FS; Special teams (ST): 11 Lee Johnson P; 55 Randy Kirk LS; 9 Doug Pelfrey K	Practice squad none Reserve: 41 Forey Duckett CB (IR); 27 Lance Gunn S (IR); 12 Donald Hollas QB (PUP); 56 Ricardo McDonald LB (IR); 95 Roosevelt Nix DE (IR); 93 Ty Parten DE (IR); 77 Kevin Sargent T (IR); 84 Milt Stegall WR (IR); 83 Elbert Turner WR (IR); 39 Sheldon White CB (NF-Inj.); 53 active, 10 inactive Rookies in italics

== Regular season ==
=== Schedule ===
Week	Date	Opponent	Result	Record	Venue	Attendance
1	September 5	at **Cleveland Browns**	**L** 14–27	0–1	Cleveland Municipal Stadium	75,508
2	September 12	Indianapolis Colts	**L** 6–9	0–2	Riverfront Stadium	50,299
3	September 19	at **Pittsburgh Steelers**	**L** 7–34	0–3	Three Rivers Stadium	53,682
4	September 26	Seattle Seahawks	**L** 10–19	0–4	Riverfront Stadium	46,880
5	Bye					
6	October 10	at Kansas City Chiefs	**L** 15–17	0–5	Arrowhead Stadium	75,394
7	October 17	**Cleveland Browns**	**L** 17–28	0–6	Riverfront Stadium	55,647
8	October 24	at **Houston Oilers**	**L** 12–28	0–7	Houston Astrodome	50,039
9	Bye					
10	November 7	**Pittsburgh Steelers**	**L** 16–24	0–8	Riverfront Stadium	51,202
11	November 14	**Houston Oilers**	**L** 3–38	0–9	Riverfront Stadium	42,347
12	November 21	at New York Jets	**L** 12–17	0–10	Giants Stadium	64,264
13	November 28	Los Angeles Raiders	**W** 16–10	1–10	Riverfront Stadium	43,272
14	December 5	at San Francisco 49ers	**L** 8–21	1–11	Candlestick Park	60,039
15	December 12	at New England Patriots	**L** 2–7	1–12	Foxboro Stadium	29,794
16	December 19	Los Angeles Rams	**W** 15–3	2–12	Riverfront Stadium	36,612
17	December 26	Atlanta Falcons	**W** 21–17	3–12	Riverfront Stadium	27,014
18	January 2, 1994	at New Orleans Saints	**L** 13–20	3–13	Louisiana Superdome	58,036
Note: Intra-division opponents are in **bold** text.

=== Standings ===
AFC Central
	W	L	T	PCT	PF	PA	STK
^{(2)} Houston Oilers	12	4	0	.750	368	238	W11
^{(6)} Pittsburgh Steelers	9	7	0	.563	308	281	W1
Cleveland Browns	7	9	0	.438	304	307	L1
Cincinnati Bengals	3	13	0	.188	187	319	L1

== Team leaders ==
=== Passing ===
Player	Att	Comp	Yds	TD	INT	Rating
David Klingler	343	190	1935	6	9	66.6

=== Rushing ===
Player	Att	Yds	YPC	Long	TD
Harold Green	215	589	2.7	25	0
Derrick Fenner	121	482	4.0	26	1

=== Receiving ===
Player	Rec	Yds	Avg	Long	TD
Jeff Query	56	654	11.7	51	4
Carl Pickens	43	565	13.1	36	6

=== Defensive ===
Player	Tackles	Sacks	INTs	FF	FR
Darryl Williams	123	2.0	2	1	1
Danny Stubbs	24	5.0	0	0	1
Michael Brim	49	0.0	3	1	1

=== Kicking and punting ===
Player	FGA	FGM	FG%	XPA	XPM	XP%	Points
Doug Pelfrey	31	24	77.4%	16	13	81.3%	85

Player	Punts	Yards	Long	Blkd	Avg.
Lee Johnson	90	3954	60	0	43.9

=== Special teams ===
Player	KR	KRYards	KRAvg	KRLong	KRTD	PR	PRYards	PRAvg	PRLong	PRTD
Patrick Robinson	30	567	18.9	42	0	43	305	7.1	36	0

== Awards and records ==
- Against the New England Patriots in Week 15, the Bengals became the first NFL team since the Minnesota Vikings against the Detroit Lions in Week 14 of 1983, to score only a safety in a game. The next occurrence in the regular season was in the opening week of the 2013 Jacksonville Jaguars season against the Chiefs (the Atlanta Falcons were limited to a safety by the New York Giants in a 2011 NFC wild card playoff game).
