= 1994 Cincinnati Bengals season =

NFL team season

- Head coach: Dave Shula
- Home stadium: Riverfront Stadium

Results
- Record: 3–13
- Division place: 3rd AFC Central
- Playoffs: Did not qualify
- Pro Bowlers: None

The 1994 Cincinnati Bengals season was the team's 27th year in professional football and its 25th with the National Football League.

On October 2 history was made at Riverfront Stadium, when Dave Shula and the Bengals faced father Don Shula's Miami Dolphins in the first father-son coaching match up in NFL history. The elder Shula would emerge victorious 23–7, as the Bengals were in the midst of a 0–8 start for the third time in four years.

The Bengals equaled their 3-13 record from 1993 and again missed out on a playoff berth. During the season, the Bengals decided to move on from the struggling David Klingler, who had not lived up to his potential as the team's quarterback of the future despite being a high draft pick. After seven weeks without a win, Klingler was pulled in favor of off-season acquisition Jeff Blake, who nearly upset the defending world champion Dallas Cowboys in his first start.

== Offseason ==
=== NFL draft ===
1994 Cincinnati Bengals draft
| Round | Pick | Player | Position | College | Notes |
| 1 | 1 | Dan Wilkinson | Defensive tackle | Ohio State | |
| 2 | 30 | Darnay Scott | Wide receiver | San Diego State | |
| 3 | 66 | Jeff Cothran | Fullback | Ohio State | |
| 3 | 86 | Steve Shine | Linebacker | Northwestern | |
| 4 | 104 | Corey Sawyer | Cornerback | Florida State | |
| 5 | 132 | Trent Pollard | Offensive tackle | Eastern Washington | |
| 6 | 162 | Kimo von Oelhoffen | Defensive tackle | Boise State | |
| 6 | 184 | Jerry Reynolds | Offensive tackle | UNLV | |
| 7 | 195 | Ramondo Stallings | Defensive end | San Diego State | |
Made roster

=== Undrafted free agents ===
1994 undrafted free agents of note
| Player | Position | College |
|---|---|---|
| Jim Ballard | Quarterback | Mount Union |
| Jeff Hill | Wide receiver | Purdue |

== Personnel ==
=== Staff ===
1994 Cincinnati Bengals staff
| Front office: President – Mike Brown; Head coaches: Head coach – Dave Shula; Offensive coaches: Offensive coordinator – Bruce Coslet; Quarterbacks – Ken Anderson; Running Backs – Jim Anderson; Wide receivers – Richard Williamson; Tight ends – Paul Alexander; Offensive line – Jim McNally | Defensive coaches: Defensive coordinator – Larry Peccatiello; Defensive line – Joe Wessel; Linebackers – Joe Pascale; Defensive backs – Ron Meeks; Defensive Staff Assistant – Bobby DePaul; Special teams coaches: Special teams – Marv Braden; Strength and conditioning: Strength – Kim Wood |

=== Roster ===
1994 Cincinnati Bengals roster
| Quarterbacks (QB): 13 Jim Ballard; 8 Jeff Blake; 7 David Klingler; 4 Erik Wilhelm; Running backs (RB): 42 Eric Ball KR; 46 Jeff Cothran FB; 44 Derrick Fenner FB; 28 Harold Green; Wide receivers (WR): 19 Jeff Hill KR; 85 Tim McGee; 80 Carl Pickens PR; 89 Jeff Query; 86 Darnay Scott KR; Tight ends (TE): 83 David Frisch; 82 Tony McGee; 87 Troy Sadowski; 88 Derek Ware | Offensive linemen (OL): 74 Rich Braham T; 65 Darrick Brilz C; 72 Scott Brumfield G; 68 Dave Cadigan G; 66 Dan Jones T; 64 Bruce Kozerski G/T; 73 Ken Moyer G/C; 76 Trent Pollard G; 77 Kevin Sargent T; Defensive linemen (DL): 92 John Copeland DE; 69 Tim Krumrie DT; 93 Ty Parten DE; 95 Keith Rucker DT; 70 Artie Smith DE; 79 Ramondo Stallings DE; 67 Kimo von Oelhoffen DT; 99 Dan Wilkinson DT; 94 Alfred Williams DE | Linebackers (LB): 50 James Francis OLB; 96 Lamont Hollinquest OLB; 57 Kevin Jefferson OLB; 56 Ricardo McDonald OLB; 53 Santo Stephens OLB; 51 Steve Tovar MLB; 91 Brett Wallerstedt MLB; Defensive backs (DB): 43 Mike Brim CB; 45 Adrian Hardy CB; 25 Rod Jones CB; 24 Roger Jones CB; 23 Corey Sawyer CB/PR; 34 Fernandus Vinson SS; 27 Bracy Walker FS; 31 Darryl Williams FS; Special teams (ST): 11 Lee Johnson P; 9 Doug Pelfrey K; 59 Greg Truitt LS | Practice squad none Reserve: 58 David Braxton LB (IR); 33 Steve Broussard RB (IR); 12 Donald Hollas QB (IR); 60 Eric Moore G (IR); 29 Louis Oliver S (IR); 52 Steve Shine LB (IR); 63 Joe Walter T (IR); 37 Leonard Wheeler CB (IR); 53 active, 8 inactive Rookies in italics |

== Regular season ==
- October 2, 1994: Dubbed the “Shula Bowl”, it marked the first time in NFL history that a head coaching matchup featured father against son. Don Shula’s Miami Dolphins defeated David Shula’s Cincinnati Bengals by a 23-7 mark.

=== Schedule ===
| Week | Date | Opponent | Result | Record | Venue | Attendance |
|---|---|---|---|---|---|---|
| 1 | September 4 | **Cleveland Browns** | L 20–28 | 0–1 | Riverfront Stadium | 52,778 |
| 2 | September 11 | at San Diego Chargers | **L** 10–27 | 0–2 | Jack Murphy Stadium | 53,217 |
| 3 | September 18 | New England Patriots | **L** 28–31 | 0–3 | Riverfront Stadium | 46,640 |
| 4 | September 25 | at **Houston Oilers** | **L** 13–20 | 0–4 | Houston Astrodome | 44,253 |
| 5 | October 2 | Miami Dolphins | **L** 7–23 | 0–5 | Riverfront Stadium | 55,056 |
| 6 | Bye | | | | | |
| 7 | October 16 | at **Pittsburgh Steelers** | **L** 10–14 | 0–6 | Three Rivers Stadium | 55,353 |
| 8 | October 23 | at **Cleveland Browns** | **L** 13–37 | 0–7 | Cleveland Municipal Stadium | 77,588 |
| 9 | October 30 | Dallas Cowboys | **L** 20–23 | 0–8 | Riverfront Stadium | 57,096 |
| 10 | November 6 | at Seattle Seahawks | **W** 20–17 (OT) | 1–8 | Kingdome | 46,630 |
| 11 | November 13 | **Houston Oilers** | **W** 34–31 | 2–8 | Riverfront Stadium | 54,908 |
| 12 | November 20 | Indianapolis Colts | **L** 13–17 | 2–9 | Riverfront Stadium | 55,566 |
| 13 | November 27 | at Denver Broncos | **L** 13–15 | 2–10 | Mile High Stadium | 69,714 |
| 14 | December 4 | **Pittsburgh Steelers** | **L** 15–38 | 2–11 | Riverfront Stadium | 53,401 |
| 15 | December 11 | at New York Giants | **L** 20–27 | 2–12 | Giants Stadium | 67,530 |
| 16 | December 18 | at Arizona Cardinals | **L** 7–28 | 2–13 | Sun Devil Stadium | 50,110 |
| 17 | December 24 | Philadelphia Eagles | **W** 33–30 | 3–13 | Riverfront Stadium | 39,923 |
Note: Intra-division opponents are in **bold** text.

=== Standings ===
AFC Central
| | W | L | T | PCT | PF | PA | STK |
|---|---|---|---|---|---|---|---|
| ^{(1)} Pittsburgh Steelers | 12 | 4 | 0 | .750 | 316 | 234 | L1 |
| ^{(4)} Cleveland Browns | 11 | 5 | 0 | .688 | 340 | 204 | W1 |
| Cincinnati Bengals | 3 | 13 | 0 | .188 | 276 | 406 | W1 |
| Houston Oilers | 2 | 14 | 0 | .125 | 226 | 352 | W1 |

== Season summary ==
=== Week 13 at Broncos ===
Week Thirteen: Cincinnati Bengals (2–9) at Denver Broncos (5–6)

| Quarter | 1 | 2 | 3 | 4 | Total |
|---|---|---|---|---|---|
| Bengals | 0 | 6 | 0 | 7 | 13 |
| Broncos | 6 | 9 | 0 | 0 | 15 |

at Mile High Stadium, Denver, Colorado

- Date: November 27, 1994
- Game time: 4:00 p.m. EDT
- Game weather: 27 °F (−3 °C)
- Game attendance: 69,714
- TV announcers (NBC): Dan Hicks, Bob Golic
- Box Score, Box Score

| Team | Category | Player | Statistics |
|---|---|---|---|
| Bengals | Passing | Jeff Blake | 15/33, 215 Yds, TD, INT |
| Bengals | Rushing | Steve Broussard | 8 Rush, 52 Yds |
| Bengals | Receiving | Carl Pickens | 6 Rec, 132 Yds, TD |
| Broncos | Passing | John Elway | 21/38, 239 Yds, TD |
| Broncos | Rushing | Leonard Russell | 13 Rush, 30 Yds |
| Broncos | Receiving | Anthony Miller | 5 Rec, 116 Yds, TD |

Scoring summary

| Quarter | Time | Drive | | | Team | Scoring information | Score | |
| Quarter | Time | Plays | Yards | TOP | Team | Scoring information | CIN | DEN |
|---|---|---|---|---|---|---|---|---|
| 1 | 12:30 | 7 | 58 | | Broncos | 34-yard field goal by Jason Elam | 0 | 3 |
| 1 | 4:13 | 6 | 4 | | Broncos | 33-yard field goal by Jason Elam | 0 | 6 |
| 2 | 7:19 | 11 | 55 | | Bengals | 43-yard field goal by Doug Pelfrey | 3 | 6 |
| 2 | 4:09 | 7 | 58 | | Broncos | Anthony Miller 16-yard touchdown reception from John Elway, 2-point conversion attempt failed | 3 | 12 |
| 2 | 2:57 | 4 | 7 | | Broncos | 37-yard field goal by Jason Elam | 3 | 15 |
| 2 | 0:11 | 11 | 66 | | Bengals | 32-yard field goal by Doug Pelfrey | 6 | 15 |
| 4 | 14:48 | 4 | 80 | | Bengals | Carl Pickens 70-yard touchdown reception from Jeff Blake, Doug Pelfrey kick good | 13 | 15 |
| "TOP" = time of possession. For other American football terms, see Glossary of American football. | | | | | | | 13 | 15 |

== Team leaders ==
=== Passing ===
| Player | Att | Comp | Yds | TD | INT | Rating |
| Jeff Blake | 306 | 156 | 2154 | 14 | 9 | 76.9 |

=== Rushing ===
| Player | Att | Yds | YPC | Long | TD |
| Derrick Fenner | 141 | 468 | 3.3 | 21 | 1 |
| Steve Broussard | 94 | 403 | 4.3 | 37 | 2 |

=== Receiving ===
| Player | Rec | Yds | Avg | Long | TD |
| Carl Pickens | 71 | 1127 | 15.9 | 70 | 11 |

=== Defensive ===
| Player | Tackles | Sacks | INTs | FF | FR |
| Steve Tovar | 122 | 3.0 | 1 | 3 | 2 |
| Alfred Williams | 48 | 9.5 | 0 | 1 | 1 |
| Louis Oliver | 63 | 1.0 | 3 | 1 | 0 |

=== Kicking and punting ===
| Player | FGA | FGM | FG% | XPA | XPM | XP% | Points |
| Doug Pelfrey | 33 | 28 | 84.8% | 25 | 24 | 96.0% | 104 |

| Player | Punts | Yards | Long | Blkd | Avg. |
| Lee Johnson | 79 | 3461 | 64 | 1 | 43.8 |

=== Special teams ===
| Player | KR | KRYards | KRAvg | KRLong | KRTD | PR | PRYards | PRAvg | PRLong | PRTD |
| Eric Ball | 42 | 915 | 21.8 | 43 | 0 | 0 | 0 | 0.0 | 0 | 0 |
| Corey Sawyer | 1 | 14 | 14.0 | 14 | 0 | 26 | 307 | 11.8 | 82 | 1 |

== Awards and records ==
- Doug Pelfrey, Franchise Record, Most Field Goals in One Game, 6 (achieved on November 6, 1994)
- Jeff Blake, AFC offensive player of the month for November
- Darnay Scott, WR, PFWA All-Rookie Team

=== Milestones ===
- Carl Pickens, 1st 1000 Yard Receiving Season (1,127 yards)
