= 1993 NFL draft =

National Football League Draft

General information
- Date: April 25–26, 1993
- Location: Marriott Marquis in New York City, New York
- Network: ESPN

Overview
- 224 total selections in 8 rounds
- League: National Football League
- First selection: Drew Bledsoe, QB; New England Patriots
- Mr. Irrelevant: Daron Alcorn, K Tampa Bay Buccaneers
- Most selections (10): Denver Broncos; New England Patriots; Pittsburgh Steelers; Tampa Bay Buccaneers
- Fewest selections (5): Kansas City Chiefs
- Hall of Famers: 5: OT Willie Roaf; RB Jerome Bettis; DE Michael Strahan; G Will Shields; S John Lynch

The 1993 NFL draft was the procedure by which National Football League teams selected amateur college football players. It is officially known as the NFL Annual Player Selection Meeting. The draft was held April 25–26, 1993, at the Marriot Marquis in New York City, New York. No teams chose to claim any players in the supplemental draft that year, but the New York Giants and Kansas City Chiefs forfeited their first- and second-round picks, respectively, due to selecting quarterback Dave Brown and defensive end Darren Mickell in the 1992 supplemental draft.

With the first overall pick of the draft, the New England Patriots selected quarterback Drew Bledsoe.

== Player selections ==
*	Compensatory selection
†	Pro Bowler (Note: Players are identified as a Pro Bowler if they were selected for the Pro Bowl at any time in their career.)
‡	Hall of Famer (Note: Players are identified as a Hall of Famer if they have been inducted into the Pro Football Hall of Fame.)

Positions key
Offense	Defense	Special teams
QB — Quarterback; RB — Running back; FB — Fullback; WR — Wide receiver; TE — Tight end; OL — Offensive lineman; T — Tackle; G — Guard; C — Center	DL — Defensive lineman; DT — Defensive tackle (Note: Includes nose tackle (NT)); DE — Defensive end; EDGE — Edge rusher; LB — Linebacker (Note: Includes middle linebacker (MLB/MIKE), weakside linebacker (WILL), strongside linebacker (SAM), off-ball linebacker, and outside linebacker (OLB)); DB — Defensive back; CB — Cornerback; S — Safety (Note: Includes free safety (FS) and strong safety (SS))	K — Kicker (Note: Also known as a placekicker (PK)); P — Punter; LS — Long snapper; RS — Return specialist (Note: Includes kickoff and punt returners)

Rnd.	Pick	Team	Player	Pos.	College	Notes
1	1	New England Patriots	Drew Bledsoe ^{†}	QB	Washington State	
1	2	Seattle Seahawks	Rick Mirer	QB	Notre Dame	
1	3	Phoenix Cardinals	Garrison Hearst ^{†}	RB	Georgia	from NY Jets (Note: No. 3: NY Jets → Phoenix (D). The NY Jets traded a first-round selection (3rd overall) to Phoenix in exchange for a first-round selection (4th overall) and RB Johnny Johnson.)
1	4	New York Jets	Marvin Jones ^{†}	LB	Florida State	from Phoenix (Note: No. 4: Phoenix → NY Jets (D). See Round 1: NY Jets → Phoenix.)
1	5	Cincinnati Bengals	John Copeland	DE	Alabama	
1	6	Tampa Bay Buccaneers	Eric Curry	DE	Alabama	
1	7	Chicago Bears	Curtis Conway	WR	USC	
1	8	New Orleans Saints	Willie Roaf^{‡}^{†}	T	Louisiana Tech	from Detroit (Note: No. 8: Detroit → New Orleans. Detroit traded first- and fourth-round selections (8th and 89th overall) to New Orleans in exchange for LB Pat Swilling.)
1	–	New York Giants	Selection forfeited during the 1992 supplemental draft. (Note: The NY Giants forfeited a first-round selection after selecting QB Dave Brown in the 1992 supplemental draft.)			
1	9	Atlanta Falcons	Lincoln Kennedy ^{†}	T	Washington	
1	10	Los Angeles Rams	Jerome Bettis^{‡}^{†}	RB	Notre Dame	
1	11	Denver Broncos	Dan Williams	DE	Toledo	from Cleveland (Note: No. 11: Cleveland → Denver. Cleveland traded a first-round selection (11th overall) to Denver in exchange for first- and third-round selections (14th and 83rd overall).)
1	12	Los Angeles Raiders	Patrick Bates	S	Texas A&M	
1*	13	Houston Oilers	Brad Hopkins ^{†}	T	Illinois	from Philadelphia (Note: No. 13: Philadelphia → Houston. Philadelphia traded a first-round selection (13th overall) to Houston in exchange for first- and third-round selections (19th and 75th overall).)
1	14	Cleveland Browns	Steve Everitt	C	Michigan	from Denver (Note: No. 14: Denver → Cleveland (D). See Round 1: Cleveland → Denver.)
1	15	Green Bay Packers	Wayne Simmons	LB	Clemson	
1	16	Indianapolis Colts	Sean Dawkins	WR	California	
1	17	Washington Redskins	Tom Carter	CB	Notre Dame	
1	18	Phoenix Cardinals	Ernest Dye	G	South Carolina	from Kansas City via San Francisco (Note: No. 18: Kansas City → San Francisco → Phoenix. Multiple trades: Kansas City → San Francisco (PD). Kansas City traded a first-round selection (18th overall) to San Francisco in exchange for QB Joe Montana. San Francisco → Phoenix (D). San Francisco traded a first-round selection (18th overall) to Phoenix in exchange for first- and fifth-round selections (20th and 116th overall).)
1	19	Philadelphia Eagles	Lester Holmes	G	Jackson State	from Houston (Note: No. 19: Houston → Philadelphia (D). See Round 1: Philadelphia → Houston.)
1*	20	New Orleans Saints	Irv Smith Sr.	TE	Notre Dame	from Phoenix via San Francisco (Note: No. 20: Phoenix → San Francisco → New Orleans. Multiple trades: Phoenix → San Francisco (D). See Round 1: San Francisco → Phoenix San Francisco → New Orleans (D). San Francisco traded a first-round selection (20th overall) to New Orleans in exchange for first- and third-round selections (26th and 81st overall).)
1	21	Minnesota Vikings	Robert Smith ^{†}	RB	Ohio State	
1	22	San Diego Chargers	Darrien Gordon ^{†}	CB	Stanford	
1	23	Pittsburgh Steelers	Deon Figures	CB	Colorado	
1	24	Philadelphia Eagles	Leonard Renfro	DT	Colorado	
1	25	Miami Dolphins	O. J. McDuffie	WR	Penn State	
1	26	San Francisco 49ers	Dana Stubblefield ^{†}	DT	Kansas	from New Orleans (Note: No. 26: New Orleans → San Francisco (D). See Round 1: San Francisco → New Orleans.)
1	27	San Francisco 49ers	Todd Kelly	DE	Tennessee	
1	28	Buffalo Bills	Thomas Smith	CB	North Carolina	
1	29	Green Bay Packers	George Teague	S	Alabama	from Dallas (Note: No. 29: Dallas → Green Bay. Dallas traded first- and fourth-round selections (29th and 112th overall) to Green Bay in exchange for two second-round selections, a fourth-round selection and an eighth-round selection (46th, 54th, 94th and 213th overall).)
2	30	Seattle Seahawks	Carlton Gray	CB	UCLA	
2	31	New England Patriots	Chris Slade ^{†}	DE	Virginia	
2	32	Phoenix Cardinals	Ben Coleman	G	Wake Forest	
2	33	Detroit Lions	Ryan McNeil ^{†}	CB	Miami (FL)	from NY Jets (Note: No. 33: NY Jets → Detroit. The NY Jets traded a second-round selection (33rd overall) to Detroit in exchange for second- and fifth-round selections (36th and 120th overall).)
2	34	Tampa Bay Buccaneers	Demetrius DuBose	LB	Notre Dame	
2	35	Chicago Bears	Carl Simpson	DT	Florida State	
2	36	New York Jets	Coleman Rudolph	DE	Georgia Tech	from Detroit (Note: No. 36: Detroit → NY Jets (D). See Round 2: NY Jets → Detroit.)
2	37	Cincinnati Bengals	Tony McGee	TE	Michigan	
2	38	Atlanta Falcons	Roger Harper	S	Ohio State	
2	39	Los Angeles Rams	Troy Drayton	TE	Penn State	
2	40	New York Giants	Michael Strahan^{‡}^{†}	DE	Texas Southern	
2	41	San Diego Chargers	Natrone Means ^{†}	RB	North Carolina	from LA Raiders via San Francisco (Note: No. 41: LA Raiders → San Francisco → San Diego. Multiple trades: LA Raiders → San Francisco (D). The LA Raiders traded a second-round selection (41st overall) to San Francisco in exchange for second- and third-round selections (56th and 81st overall). San Francisco → San Diego (D). San Francisco traded a second-round selection (41st overall) to San Diego in exchange for a 1994 first-round selection.)
2	42	Cleveland Browns	Dan Footman	DE	Florida State	
2	43	Denver Broncos	Glyn Milburn ^{†}	RB	Stanford	
2	44	Pittsburgh Steelers	Chad Brown ^{†}	LB	Colorado	from Indianapolis (Note: No. 44: Indianapolis → Pittsburgh. Indianapolis traded a second-round selection (44th overall) to Pittsburgh in exchange for second- and fourth-round selections (49th and 107th overall).)
2	45	Washington Redskins	Reggie Brooks	RB	Notre Dame	
2	46	Dallas Cowboys	Kevin Williams	WR	Miami (FL)	from Green Bay (Note: No. 46: Green Bay → Dallas (D). See Round 1: Dallas → Green Bay.)
2	47	Houston Oilers	Micheal Barrow	LB	Miami (FL)	
2	–	Kansas City Chiefs	Selection forfeited during the 1992 supplemental draft. (Note: Kansas City forfeited a second-round selection after selecting DE Darren Mickell in the 1992 supplemental draft.)			
2	48	San Francisco 49ers	Adrian Hardy	CB	Northwestern State	from San Diego (Note: No. 48: San Diego → San Francisco. San Diego traded a second-round selection (48th overall) to San Francisco in exchange for third-, fourth- and fifth-round selections (82nd, 110th and 138th overall).)
2	49	Indianapolis Colts	Roosevelt Potts	RB	Northeast Louisiana	from Pittsburgh (Note: No. 49: Pittsburgh → Indianapolis (D). See Round 2: Indianapolis → Pittsburgh.)
2	50	Philadelphia Eagles	Victor Bailey	WR	Missouri	
2	51	New England Patriots	Todd Rucci	G	Penn State	from Miami (Note: No. 51: Miami → New England (PD). Miami traded a second-round selection (51st overall) and a 1994 third-round selection to New England in exchange for WR Irving Fryar.)
2	52	Minnesota Vikings	Qadry Ismail	WR	Syracuse	
2	53	New Orleans Saints	Reggie Freeman	LB	Florida State	
2	54	Dallas Cowboys	Darrin Smith	LB	Miami (FL)	from San Francisco via Green Bay (Note: No. 54: San Francisco → Green Bay → Dallas. Multiple trades: San Francisco → Green Bay (PD). San Francisco traded a second-round selection (54th overall) to Green Bay in exchange for LB Tim Harris. Green Bay → Dallas (D). See Round 1: Dallas → Green Bay.)
2	55	Buffalo Bills	John Parrella	DT	Nebraska	
2	56	New England Patriots	Vincent Brisby	WR	Northeast Louisiana	from Dallas via San Francisco (Note: No. 56: Dallas → San Francisco → New England. Multiple trades: Dallas → San Francisco (PD). Dallas traded a second-round selection (56th overall) and a 1994 third-round selection to San Francisco in exchange for DE Charles Haley. San Francisco → LA Raiders (D). See Round 2: LA Raiders → San Francisco. Los Angeles Raiders (D). (Time expired.) This selection belonged to the LA Raiders but they did not submit their pick in time, allowing New England to jump in front of them.)
3	57	Minnesota Vikings	John Gerak	G	Penn State	from New England via Seattle (Note: No. 57: New England → Seattle → Minnesota. Multiple trades: (Time expired for LA Raiders.) Seattle → Minnesota (PD). Seattle traded a third-round selection (58th) and a 1992 second-round selection to Minnesota in exchange for DT Keith Millard.)
3	58	Los Angeles Raiders	Billy Joe Hobert	QB	Washington	
3	59	Cincinnati Bengals	Steve Tovar	LB	Ohio State	from NY Jets (Note: No. 59: NY Jets → Cincinnati (PD). The NY Jets traded a third-round selection (59th overall) to Cincinnati in exchange for QB Boomer Esiason.)
3	60	Tampa Bay Buccaneers	Lamar Thomas	WR	Miami (FL)	from Phoenix (Note: No. 60: Phoenix → Tampa Bay (PD). Phoenix traded a third-round selection (60th overall) to Tampa Bay in exchange for DL Reuben Davis.)
3	61	Chicago Bears	Chris Gedney	TE	Syracuse	
3	62	Detroit Lions	Antonio London	DT	Alabama	
3	63	Cincinnati Bengals	Ty Parten	DT	Arizona	
3	64	San Diego Chargers	Joe Cocozzo	G	Michigan	from Tampa Bay (Note: No. 64: Tampa Bay → San Diego (D). Tampa Bay traded a third-round selection (64th overall) to San Diego in exchange for third- and fourth-round selections (82nd and 104th overall).)
3	65	Indianapolis Colts	Ray Buchanan ^{†}	CB	Louisville	from LA Rams (Note: No. 65: LA Rams → Indianapolis (D). LA Rams traded a third-round selection (65th overall) to Indianapolis in exchange for third- and fifth-round selections (73rd and 127th overall).)
3	66	New York Giants	Marcus Buckley	LB	Texas A&M	
3	67	Atlanta Falcons	Harold Alexander	P	Appalachian State	
3	68	Detroit Lions	Mike Compton	C	West Virginia	from Cleveland (Note: No. 68: Cleveland → Detroit (PD). Cleveland traded a third-round selection (68th overall) to Detroit in exchange for DT Jerry Ball.)
3	69	Denver Broncos	Rondell Jones	S	North Carolina	from LA Raiders (Note: No. 69: LA Raiders → Denver (PD). The LA Raiders traded a third-round selection (69th overall) to Denver in exchange for RB Gaston Green.)
3	70	Denver Broncos	Jason Elam ^{†}	K	Hawaii	
3	71	Washington Redskins	Rick Hamilton	LB	UCF	
3	72	Los Angeles Raiders	James Trapp	CB	Clemson	from Green Bay (Note: No. 72: Green Bay → LA Raiders (D). Green Bay traded a third-round selection (72nd overall) to LA Raiders in exchange for third- and sixth-round selections (81st and 152nd overall).)
3	73	Los Angeles Rams	Russell White	RB	California	from Indianapolis (Note: No. 73: Indianapolis → LA Rams (D). See Round 3: LA Rams → Indianapolis.)
3	74	Kansas City Chiefs	Will Shields^{‡}^{†}	G	Nebraska	
3	75	Philadelphia Eagles	Derrick Frazier	CB	Texas A&M	from Houston (Note: No. 75: Houston → Philadelphia (D). See Round 1: Philadelphia → Houston.)
3	76	Pittsburgh Steelers	Andre Hastings	WR	Georgia	
3	77	Philadelphia Eagles	Mike Reid	S	NC State	
3	78	Miami Dolphins	Terry Kirby	RB	Virginia	
3	79	Minnesota Vikings	Gilbert Brown	DT	Kansas	
3	80	Washington Redskins	Ed Bunn	P	Texas-El Paso	from San Diego (Note: No. 80: San Diego → Washington (PD). San Diego traded a third-round selection (80th overall) to Washington in exchange for QB Stan Humphries.)
3	81	Green Bay Packers	Earl Dotson	T	Texas A&M–Kingsville	from New Orleans via San Francisco and LA Raiders (Note: No. 81: New Orleans → San Francisco → LA Raiders → Green Bay. Multiple trades: New Orleans → San Francisco (D). See Round 1: San Francisco → New Orleans. San Francisco → LA Raiders (D). See Round 2: LA Raiders → San Francisco. LA Raiders → Green Bay (D). See Round 3: Green Bay → LA Raiders.)
3	82	Tampa Bay Buccaneers	John Lynch^{‡}^{†}	S	Stanford	from San Francisco via San Diego (Note: No. 82: San Francisco → San Diego → Tampa Bay. Multiple trades: San Francisco → San Diego (D). See Round 2: San Diego → San Francisco. San Diego → Tampa Bay (D). See Round 3: Tampa Bay → San Diego.)
3	83	Cleveland Browns	Mike Caldwell	LB	Middle Tennessee	from Buffalo via Atlanta and Denver (Note: No. 83: Buffalo → Atlanta → Denver → Cleveland. Multiple trades: Buffalo → Atlanta (PD). Buffalo sent a third-round selection (83rd overall) to Atlanta as compensation for signing restricted free agent DE Oliver Barnett. Atlanta → Denver (PD). Atlanta traded third- and seventh-round selections (83rd and 169th overall) to Denver in exchange for CB Alton Montgomery. Denver → Cleveland (D). See Round 1: Cleveland → Denver.)
3	84	Dallas Cowboys	Mike Middleton	S	Indiana	
4	85	Seattle Seahawks	Dean Wells	LB	Kentucky	
4	86	New England Patriots	Kevin Johnson	DT	Texas Southern	
4	87	Phoenix Cardinals	Ronald Moore	RB	Pittsburg State (KS)	
4	88	New York Jets	David Ware	T	Virginia	
4	89	New Orleans Saints	Lorenzo Neal ^{†}	FB	Fresno State	from Detroit (Note: No. 89: Detroit → New Orleans (PD). See Round 1: Detroit → New Orleans.)
4	90	Cincinnati Bengals	Marcello Simmons	CB	SMU	
4	91	Tampa Bay Buccaneers	Rudy Harris	RB	Clemson	
4	92	Indianapolis Colts	Derwin Gray	S	BYU	from Chicago (Note: No. 92: Chicago → Indianapolis (D). Chicago traded a fourth-round selection (92nd overall) to Indianapolis in exchange for fourth- and sixth-round selections (100th and 156th overall).)
4	93	New York Giants	Greg Bishop	T	Pacific	
4	94	Dallas Cowboys	Derrick Lassic	RB	Alabama	from Atlanta via Green Bay (Note: No. 94: Atlanta → Green Bay → Dallas. Multiple trades: Atlanta → Green Bay (PD). Atlanta traded a fourth-round selection (94th overall) to Green Bay in exchange for CB Vinnie Clark. Green Bay → Dallas (D). See Round 1: Dallas → Green Bay.)
4	95	San Diego Chargers	Raylee Johnson	DE	Arkansas	from LA Rams (Note: No. 95: LA Rams → San Diego (PD). The LA Rams traded a fourth-round selection (95th overall) to San Diego in exchange for OL Leo Goeas.)
4	96	Dallas Cowboys	Ron Stone ^{†}	G	Boston College	from LA Raiders (Note: No. 96: LA Raiders → Dallas (PD). The LA Raiders traded a fourth-round selection (96th overall) to Dallas in exchange for WR Alexander Wright.)
4	97	Chicago Bears	Todd Perry	G	Kentucky	from Cleveland (Note: No. 97: Cleveland → Chicago (PD). Cleveland traded a fourth-round selection (97th overall) to Chicago in exchange for C Jay Hilgenberg.)
4	98	Denver Broncos	Jeff Robinson	DE	Idaho	
4	99	San Diego Chargers	Lewis Bush	LB	Washington State	from Green Bay via New England (Note: No. 99: Green Bay → New England → San Diego. Multiple trades: Green Bay → New England (PD). Green Bay traded a fourth-round selection (99th overall) to New England in exchange for RB John Stephens. New England → San Diego (D). New England traded a fourth-round selection (99th overall) to San Diego in exchange for fourth- and fifth-round selections (110th and 138th overall).)
4	100	Chicago Bears	Myron Baker	LB	Louisiana Tech	from Indianapolis (Note: No. 100: Indianapolis → Chicago (D). See Round 4: Chicago → Indianapolis.)
4	101	Washington Redskins	Sterling Palmer	DE	Florida State	
4	102	Houston Oilers	Travis Hannah	WR	USC	
4	103	Kansas City Chiefs	Jaime Fields	LB	Washington	
4	104	Tampa Bay Buccaneers	Horace Copeland	WR	Miami (FL)	from Philadelphia via San Diego (Note: No. 104: Philadelphia → San Diego → Tampa Bay. Multiple trades: Philadelphia → San Diego (PD). Philadelphia traded a fourth-round selection (104th overall) to San Diego in exchange for OL Broderick Thompson. San Diego → Tampa Bay (D). See Round 3: Tampa Bay → San Diego.)
4	105	Miami Dolphins	Ronnie Bradford	CB	Colorado	
4	106	Minnesota Vikings	Ashley Sheppard	LB	Clemson	
4	107	Indianapolis Colts	Devon McDonald	LB	Notre Dame	from San Diego via Pittsburgh (Note: No. 107: San Diego → Pittsburgh → Indianapolis. Multiple trades: San Diego → Pittsburgh. San Diego sent a fourth-round selection (107th overall) to Pittsburgh as compensation for signing restricted free agent LB Jerrol Williams. Pittsburgh → Indianapolis (D). See Round 2: Indianapolis → Pittsburgh.)
4	108	Pittsburgh Steelers	Kevin Henry	DE	Mississippi State	
4	109	New Orleans Saints	Derek Brown	RB	Nebraska	
4	110	New England Patriots	Corwin Brown	S	Michigan	from San Francisco via San Diego (Note: No. 110: San Francisco → San Diego → New England. Multiple trades: San Francisco → San Diego (D). See Round 2: San Diego → San Francisco. San Diego → New England (D). See Round 4: San Diego → New England.)
4	111	Buffalo Bills	Russell Copeland	WR	Memphis State	
4	112	Chicago Bears	Albert Fontenot	DE	Baylor	from Dallas via Green Bay (Note: No. 112: Dallas → Green Bay → Chicago. Multiple trades: Dallas → Green Bay (D). See Round 1: Dallas → Green Bay. Green Bay → Chicago (D). Green Bay traded a fourth-round selection (112th overall) to Chicago in exchange for fifth- and sixth-round selections (119th and 156th overall).)
5	113	New England Patriots	Scott Sisson	K	Georgia Tech	
5	114	Seattle Seahawks	Terrence Warren	WR	Hampton	
5	115	New York Jets	Fred Baxter	TE	Auburn	
5	116	San Francisco 49ers	Artie Smith	DT	Louisiana Tech	from Phoenix (Note: No. 116: Phoenix → San Francisco (D). See Round 1: San Francisco → Phoenix.)
5	117	Cincinnati Bengals	Forey Duckett	CB	Nevada	
5	118	Green Bay Packers	Mark Brunell ^{†}	QB	Washington	from Tampa Bay (Note: No. 118: Tampa Bay → Green Bay (PD). Tampa Bay sent a fifth-round selection (118th overall) to Green Bay as compensation for signing restricted free agent RB Vince Workman.)
5	119	Green Bay Packers	James Willis	LB	Auburn	from Chicago (Note: No. 119: Chicago → Green Bay (D). See Round 4: Green Bay → Chicago.)
5	120	New York Jets	Adrian Murrell	RB	West Virginia	from Detroit (Note: No. 120: Detroit → NY Jets (D). See Round 2: NY Jets → Detroit.)
5	121	Atlanta Falcons	Ron George	LB	Stanford	
5	122	Los Angeles Rams	Sean LaChapelle	WR	UCLA	
5	123	New York Giants	Tommy Thigpen	LB	North Carolina	
5	124	Cleveland Browns	Herman Arvie	T	Grambling State	
5	125	Los Angeles Raiders	Olanda Truitt	WR	Mississippi State	
5	126	Denver Broncos	Kevin Williams	RB	UCLA	
5	127	Los Angeles Rams	Chuck Belin	G	Wisconsin	from LA Rams (Note: No. 127: Indianapolis → LA Rams (D). See Round 3: LA Rams → Indianapolis.)
5	128	Washington Redskins	Greg Huntington	C	Penn State	
5	129	New York Jets	Kenny Shedd	WB	Northern Iowa	from Green Bay (Note: No. 129: Green Bay → NY Jets (PD). Green Bay traded a fifth-round selection (129th overall) to the NY Jets in exchange for QB Ken O'Brien.)
5	130	Kansas City Chiefs	Lindsay Knapp	G	Notre Dame	
5	131	Houston Oilers	John Henry Mills ^{†}	TE	Wake Forest	
5	132	Miami Dolphins	Chris Gray	G	Auburn	
5	133	Minnesota Vikings	Everett Lindsay	G	Ole Miss	
5	134	San Diego Chargers	Walter Dunson	WR	Middle Tennessee	
5	135	Pittsburgh Steelers	Lonnie Palelei	G	UNLV	
5	136	Buffalo Bills	Mike Devlin	C	Iowa	from Philadelphia (Note: No. 136: Philadelphia → Buffalo (PD). Philadelphia traded a fifth-round selection (136th overall) to Buffalo in exchange for DE Leon Seals.)
5	137	New Orleans Saints	Tyrone Hughes ^{†}	CB	Nebraska	
5	138	New England Patriots	Rich Griffith	TE	Arizona	from San Francisco via San Diego (Note: No. 138: San Francisco → San Diego → New England. Multiple trades: San Francisco → San Diego (D). See Round 2: San Diego → San Francisco. San Diego → New England (D). See Round 4: San Diego → New England.)
5	139	Buffalo Bills	Sebastian Savage	CB	NC State	
5	140	Pittsburgh Steelers	Marc Woodard	LB	Mississippi State	from Dallas (Note: No. 140: Dallas → Pittsburgh (PD). Dallas traded a fifth-round selection (140th overall) to Pittsburgh in exchange for S Thomas Everett.)
6	141	Green Bay Packers	Doug Evans	CB	Louisiana Tech	from Seattle (Note: No. 141: Seattle → Green Bay (PD). Seattle traded a sixth-round selection (141st overall) to Green Bay in exchange for CB Dave McCloughan.)
6	142	New England Patriots	Lawrence Hatch	CB	Florida	
6	143	Phoenix Cardinals	Brett Wallerstedt	LB	Arizona State	
6	144	New York Jets	Richie Anderson ^{†}	FB	Penn State	
6	145	Tampa Bay Buccaneers	Chidi Ahanotu	DT	California	
6	146	Chicago Bears	Dave Hoffmann	LB	Washington	
6	147	Detroit Lions	Greg Jeffries	S	Virginia	
6	148	Cincinnati Bengals	Tom Scott	T	East Carolina	
6	149	Los Angeles Rams	Deral Boykin	CB	Louisville	
6	150	New York Giants	Scott Davis	G	Iowa	
6	151	Atlanta Falcons	Mitch Lyons	TE	Michigan State	
6	152	Green Bay Packers	Paul Hutchins	T	Western Michigan	from LA Raiders (Note: No. 152: LA Raiders → Green Bay (D). See Round 3: Green Bay → LA Raiders.)
6	153	Cleveland Browns	Rich McKenzie	LB	Penn State	
6	154	Denver Broncos	Melvin Bonner	WR	Baylor	
6	155	Washington Redskins	Darryl Morrison	S	Arizona	
6	156	Green Bay Packers	Tim Watson	S	Howard	from Green Bay via Indianapolis and Chicago (Note: No. 156: Green Bay → Indianapolis → Chicago → Green Bay. Multiple trades: Green Bay → Indianapolis (PD). Green Bay traded a sixth-round selection (156th overall) to Indianapolis in exchange for CB Dave McCloughan. Indianapolis → Chicago (D). See Round 4: Chicago → Indianapolis. Chicago → Green Bay (D). See Round 4: Green Bay → Chicago.)
6	157	Indianapolis Colts	Carlos Etheredge	TE	Miami (FL)	
6	158	Houston Oilers	Chuck Bradley	T	Kentucky	
6	159	Kansas City Chiefs	Darius Turner	RB	Washington	
6	160	Washington Redskins	Frank Wycheck ^{†}	TE	Maryland	from Minnesota (Note: No. 160: Minnesota → Washington (PD). Minnesota traded a sixth-round selection (160th overall) to Washington in exchange for WR Joe Johnson.)
6	161	San Diego Chargers	Eric Castle	S	Oregon	
6	162	Pittsburgh Steelers	Willie Williams	CB	Western Carolina	
6	163	Philadelphia Eagles	Derrick Oden	LB	Alabama	
6	164	Miami Dolphins	Robert O'Neal	CB	Clemson	
6	165	New Orleans Saints	Ronnie Dixon	DT	Cincinnati	
6	166	San Francisco 49ers	Chris Dalman	G	Stanford	
6	167	Buffalo Bills	Corbin Lacina	G	Augustana College (SD)	
6	168	Dallas Cowboys	Barry Minter	LB	Tulsa	
7	169	Denver Broncos	Clarence Williams	TE	Washington State	from New England via Atlanta (Note: No. 169: New England → Atlanta → Denver. Multiple trades: New England → Atlanta (PD). New England traded a seventh-round selection (169th overall) to Atlanta in exchange for OL Reggie Redding. Atlanta → Denver (D). See Round 3: Atlanta → Denver.)
7	170	Seattle Seahawks	Michael McCrary ^{†}	DE	Wake Forest	
7	171	New York Jets	Alec Millen	T	Georgia	
7	172	Phoenix Cardinals	Will White	DB	Florida	
7	173	Chicago Bears	Keshon Johnson	CB	Arizona	
7	174	Detroit Lions	Ty Hallock	LB	Michigan State	
7	175	Cincinnati Bengals	Lance Gunn	S	Texas	
7	176	Tampa Bay Buccaneers	Tyree Davis	WR	Central Arkansas	
7	177	New York Giants	Todd Peterson	K	Georgia	
7	178	Atlanta Falcons	Darnell Walker	CB	Oklahoma	
7	179	Los Angeles Rams	Brad Fichtel	C	Eastern Illinois	
7	180	Cleveland Browns	Travis Hill	LB	Nebraska	
7	181	Los Angeles Raiders	Greg Biekert	LB	Colorado	
7	182	Denver Broncos	Tony Kimbrough	WR	Jackson State	
7	183	Green Bay Packers	Bob Kuberski	DE	Navy	
7	184	Indianapolis Colts	Lance Lewis	RB	Nebraska	
7	185	Pittsburgh Steelers	Jeff Zgonina	DT	Purdue	from Washington (Note: No. 185: Washington → Pittsburgh (PD). Washington traded a seventh-round selection (185th overall) to Pittsburgh in exchange for DE Huey Richardson.)
7	186	Kansas City Chiefs	Danan Hughes	WR	Iowa	
7	187	Houston Oilers	Patrick Robinson	WR	Tennessee State	
7	188	San Diego Chargers	Doug Miller	LB	South Dakota State	
7	189	Pittsburgh Steelers	Craig Keith	TE	Lenoir–Rhyne	
7	190	Philadelphia Eagles	Joey Mickey	TE	Oklahoma	
7	191	Miami Dolphins	David Merritt	LB	NC State	
7	192	Minnesota Vikings	Gino Torretta	QB	Miami (FL)	
7	193	New Orleans Saints	Othello Henderson	CB	UCLA	
7	194	San Francisco 49ers	Troy Wilson	DL	Pittsburg State (KS)	
7	195	Buffalo Bills	Willie Harris	WR	Mississippi State	
7	196	Dallas Cowboys	Brock Marion ^{†}	S	Nevada	
8	197	Seattle Seahawks	Jeff Blackshear	G	Northeast Louisiana	
8	198	New England Patriots	Troy Brown ^{†}	WR	Marshall	
8	199	Phoenix Cardinals	Chad Brown	DE	Ole Miss	
8	200	New York Jets	Craig Hentrich ^{†}	P	Notre Dame	
8	201	Detroit Lions	Kevin Miniefield	CB	Arizona State	
8	202	Cincinnati Bengals	Doug Pelfrey	K	Kentucky	
8	203	Dallas Cowboys	Dave Thomas	CB	Tennessee	from Tampa Bay (Note: No. 203: Tampa Bay → Dallas (PD). Tampa Bay traded an eighth-round selection (203rd overall) to Dallas in exchange for an eighth-round selection (224th overall) and DB Garry Lewis.)
8	204	Seattle Seahawks	Antonio Edwards	DE	Valdosta State	from Chicago (Note: No. 204: Chicago → Seattle (PD). Chicago sent an eighth-round selection (204th overall) to Seattle as compensation for signing restricted free agent LB Joe Cain.)
8	205	Atlanta Falcons	Shannon Baker	WR	Florida State	
8	206	Los Angeles Rams	Jeff Buffaloe	P	Memphis State	
8	207	New York Giants	Jessie Armstead ^{†}	LB	Miami (FL)	
8	208	Los Angeles Raiders	Greg Robinson	RB	Northeast Louisiana	
8	209	Los Angeles Rams	Maa Tanuvasa	DT	Hawaii	from Cleveland (Note: No. 209: Cleveland → LA Rams (PD). Cleveland traded an eighth-round selection (209th overall) to the LA Rams in exchange for LB Frank Stams.)
8	210	Denver Broncos	Brian Stablein	WB	Ohio State	
8	211	Indianapolis Colts	Marquise Thomas	LB	Ole Miss	
8	212	Washington Redskins	Lamont Hollinquest	LB	USC	
8	213	Dallas Cowboys	Reggie Givens	CB	Penn State	from Green Bay (Note: No. 213: Green Bay → Dallas (D). See Round 1: Dallas → Green Bay.)
8	214	Houston Oilers	Blaine Bishop ^{†}	S	Ball State	
8	215	Phoenix Cardinals	Stevie Anderson	WR	Grambling State	from Kansas City (Note: No. 215: Kansas City → Phoenix (PD). Kansas City traded an eighth-round selection (215th overall) to Phoenix in exchange for CB Jay Taylor.)
8	216	Pittsburgh Steelers	Alex Van Pelt	QB	Pittsburgh	
8	217	Philadelphia Eagles	Doug Skene	T	Michigan	
8	218	Miami Dolphins	Dwayne Gordon	LB	New Hampshire	
8	219	San Francisco 49ers	Elvis Grbac ^{†}	QB	Michigan	from Minnesota (Note: No. 219: Minnesota → San Francisco (PD). Minnesota traded an eighth-round selection (219th overall) to San Francisco in exchange for RB Keith Henderson.)
8	220	Tampa Bay Buccaneers	Darrick Branch	WR	Hawaii	from San Diego (Note: No. 220: San Diego → Tampa Bay (PD). San Diego traded an eighth-round selection (220th overall) to Tampa Bay in exchange for LB Kevin Murphy.)
8	221	New Orleans Saints	Jon Kirksey	DT	Sacramento State	
8	222	San Diego Chargers	Trent Green ^{†}	QB	Indiana	from San Francisco (Note: No. 222: San Francisco → San Diego (D). San Francisco traded an eighth-round selection (222nd overall) to San Diego in exchange for a 1994 sixth-round selection.)
8	223	Buffalo Bills	Chris Leuneberg	T	West Chester (PA)	
8	224	Tampa Bay Buccaneers	Daron Alcorn	K	Akron	from Dallas (Note: No. 224: Dallas → Tampa Bay (D). See Round 8: Tampa Bay → Dallas.)

== Trades ==
In the explanations below, (D) denotes trades that took place during the 1993 Draft, while (PD) indicates trades completed pre-draft.

Round 1

Round 2

Round 3

Round 4

Round 5

Round 6

Round 7

Round 8

== Forfeited picks ==
Two selections in the 1993 draft were forfeited:

== Notable undrafted players ==
†	Pro Bowler

Original NFL team	Player	Pos.	College	Notes
Atlanta Falcons	Robbie Tobeck ^{†}	C	Washington State	
Atlanta Falcons	David Mims	WR	Baylor	
Atlanta Falcons	Darryl Spencer	WR	Miami (FL)	
Buffalo Bills	Monty Brown	LB	Ferris State	
Buffalo Bills	Yonel Jourdain	RB	Southern Illinois	
Buffalo Bills	David White	LB	Nebraska	
Chicago Bears	Todd Burger	G	Penn State	
Chicago Bears	Trevor Cobb	RB	Rice	
Chicago Bears	Shane Matthews	QB	Florida	
Chicago Bears	Ryan Wetnight	TE	Stanford	
Cincinnati Bengals	Ryan Benjamin	RB	Pacific	
Cincinnati Bengals	Scott Brumfield	G	BYU	
Cincinnati Bengals	Allen DeGraffenreid	WR	Ohio State	
Cincinnati Bengals	Mike Dulaney	FB	North Carolina	
Cincinnati Bengals	David Frisch	TE	Colorado State	
Cincinnati Bengals	Dan Jones	T	Maine	
Cincinnati Bengals	Donnell Johnson	DE	Johnson C. Smith	
Cincinnati Bengals	Karmeeleyah McGill	LB	Notre Dame	
Cleveland Browns	Orlando Brown	T	South Carolina State	
Cleveland Browns	Tim Jacobs	CB	Delaware	
Cleveland Browns	Shar Pourdanesh	T	Nevada	
Cleveland Browns	Del Speer	CB	Florida	
Cleveland Browns	Wally Williams	G	Florida A&M	
Denver Broncos	Greg Primus	WR	Colorado State	
Detroit Lions	Larry Ryans	WR	Clemson	
Detroit Lions	Mack Travis	DT	California	
Green Bay Packers	Josh Miller	P	Arizona	
Green Bay Packers	Matt Turk ^{†}	P	Wisconsin–Whitewater	
Houston Oilers	James Atkins	OL	Southwestern Louisiana	
Indianapolis Colts	Brian Ratigan	LB	Notre Dame	
Indianapolis Colts	Mike Vanderjagt ^{†}	K	West Virginia	
Indianapolis Colts	Kipp Vickers	G	Miami (FL)	
Kansas City Chiefs	Mike Bartrum ^{†}	LS	Marshall	
Los Angeles Raiders	Cary Brabham	S	SMU	
Los Angeles Raiders	James Jett	WR	West Virginia	
Los Angeles Raiders	Charles Jordan	WR	Long Beach City College	
Los Angeles Raiders	Randy Jordan	RB	North Carolina	
Los Angeles Rams	Jamie Martin	QB	Weber State	
Miami Dolphins	Brandon Moore	T	Duke	
Minnesota Vikings	Ron Carpenter	S	Miami (OH)	
Minnesota Vikings	Dave Garnett	LB	Stanford	
Minnesota Vikings	Robert Griffith ^{†}	S	San Diego State	
Minnesota Vikings	Eric Guliford	WR	Arizona State	
New England Patriots	Ray Crittenden	WR	Virginia Tech	
New England Patriots	Corey Croom	RB	Ball State	
New England Patriots	Ronnie Harris	WR	Oregon	
New England Patriots	Vernon Lewis	DB	Pittsburgh	
New Orleans Saints	George Coghill	S	Wake Forest	
New Orleans Saints	Tom McManus	LB	Boston College	
New Orleans Saints	Shane Pahukoa	S	Washington	
New Orleans Saints	Pete Shufelt	LB	UTEP	
New York Giants	Willie Beamon	CB	Northern Iowa	
New York Giants	Keith Crawford	WR	Howard Payne	
New York Giants	Brian Kozlowski	TE	Connecticut	
New York Jets	Rob Davis	LS	Shippensburg	
New York Jets	Victor Green	S	Akron	
New York Jets	Matt Willig	T	USC	
Philadelphia Eagles	Mike Chalenski	DE	UCLA	
Philadelphia Eagles	Vaughn Hebron	RB	Virginia Tech	
Phoenix Cardinals	Chad Fann	TE	Florida A&M	
San Diego Chargers	Darren Bennett ^{†}	P		Australian rules football player
San Diego Chargers	Everett McIver	G	Elizabeth City State	
San Diego Chargers	Dominic S Robinson	RB	Texas A&M	
San Francisco 49ers	Tomur Barnes	CB	North Texas	
San Francisco 49ers	Junior Bryant	DT	Notre Dame	
Seattle Seahawks	Arnold Ale	LB	UCLA	
Seattle Seahawks	Mack Strong ^{†}	FB	Georgia	
Tampa Bay Buccaneers	Curtis Buckley	CB	East Texas	
Tampa Bay Buccaneers	Michael Husted	K	Virginia	
Tampa Bay Buccaneers	Shawn Price	DT	Pacific	
Washington Redskins	Gregory Clifton	WR	Johnson C. Smith	

== Hall of Famers ==
- Willie Roaf, offensive tackle from Louisiana Tech, taken 1st round 8th overall by New Orleans Saints.

Inducted: Professional Football Hall of Fame class of 2012.

- Michael Strahan, defensive end from Texas Southern, taken 2nd round 40th overall by New York Giants.

Inducted: Professional Football Hall of Fame class of 2014.

- Jerome Bettis, running back from Notre Dame, taken 1st round 10th overall by Los Angeles Rams.

Inducted: Professional Football Hall of Fame class of 2015.

- Will Shields, offensive guard from Nebraska, taken 3rd round 74th overall by Kansas City Chiefs.

Inducted: Professional Football Hall of Fame class of 2015.

- John Lynch, safety from Stanford, taken 3rd round 82nd overall by Tampa Bay Buccaneers.

Inducted: Professional Football Hall of Fame Class of 2021.
