= 1997 Cincinnati Bengals season =

NFL team season

- Head coach: Bruce Coslet
- Home stadium: Cinergy Field

Results
- Record: 7–9
- Division place: 4th AFC Central
- Playoffs: Did not qualify
- Pro Bowlers: None

The 1997 Cincinnati Bengals season was the team's 30th season in professional football and its 28th in the National Football League. After winning the first game of the season, the Bengals lost their next seven games to effectively end any playoff hopes. The struggles cost Jeff Blake his starting quarterback job, as former Bengal starting quarterback Boomer Esiason, who was reacquired in the off-season, came back in to lead the Bengals. With Esiason back under center the Bengals started to win as he connected on 13 touchdown passes, while giving up two interceptions. The Bengals won six of their final eight games, to finish with a 7–9 record. Just as the Bengals were ready to give Esiason the job full-time, he got a lucrative offer from ABC-TV to do games on Monday Night Football. Since he would earn more money on ABC he decided to retire. Running back Corey Dillon set a rookie rushing record (since broken) for most yards in a game. On December 4, 1997, Dillon rushed for 246 yards in a game against the Tennessee Oilers.

For the season, the Bengals sported new uniforms and a new logo, which would remain until 2003. The new tiger head logo remains in use today. The team's 31–26 win over the Jaguars, who went 11–5, on November 23, was their only win against a team with a winning record from 1997 to 1999. They went 1–6 against teams with a winning record.

== Offseason ==
=== NFL draft ===
1997 Cincinnati Bengals draft
Round	Pick	Player	Position	College	Notes
1	14	Reinard Wilson	Linebacker	Florida State	
2	43	Corey Dillon *	Running back	Washington	
3	76	Rod Payne	Center	Michigan	
4	111	Tremain Mack *	Defensive back	Miami (FL)	
5	144	Andre Purvis	Defensive tackle	North Carolina	
6	176	Canute Curtis	Linebacker	West Virginia	
7	217	William Carr	Defensive tackle	Michigan	
Made roster * Made at least one Pro Bowl during career

== Personnel ==
=== Staff ===
1997 Cincinnati Bengals staff
Front office: President – Mike Brown; Head coaches: Head coach – Bruce Coslet; Assistant head coach/defensive Coordinator – Dick LeBeau; Offensive coaches: Offensive coordinator – Ken Anderson; Running backs – Jim Anderson; Tight ends – Bob Wylie; Offensive line – Paul Alexander; Offensive Staff Assistant – John Garrett	Defensive coaches: Defensive line – Tim Krumrie; Linebackers – Mark Duffner; Defensive backs – Ray Horton; Defensive Staff Assistant – Louie Cioffi; Special teams coaches: Special teams – Al Roberts; Strength and conditioning: Strength and conditioning – Kim Wood

=== Roster ===
1997 Cincinnati Bengals roster
Quarterbacks (QB): 8 Jeff Blake; 7 Boomer Esiason; 15 Eric Kresser; Running backs (RB): 21 Eric Bieniemy KR; 32 Ki-Jana Carter; 28 Corey Dillon; 45 Ty Douthard; 44 Brian Milne FB; Wide receivers (WR): 80 David Dunn KR; 85 James Hundon; 84 Mike Jenkins; 86 Darnay Scott; Tight ends (TE): 89 Marco Battaglia; 88 Steve Bush; 82 Tony McGee	Offensive linemen (OL): 71 Willie Anderson T; 66 Ken Blackman G; 74 Rich Braham G; 65 Darrick Brilz C; 75 Anthony Brown G/T; 72 Scott Brumfield G; 68 Joel Davis G *; 62 Brock Gutierrez C; 60 Rod Jones T; 64 Rod Payne C; 77 Kevin Sargent T; Defensive linemen (DL): 96 Brentson Buckner NT; 92 John Copeland DE; 94 Jevon Langford DE; 67 Kimo von Oelhoffen NT; 97 Andre Purvis DE; 93 Mike Thompson NT; 99 Dan Wilkinson DE	Linebackers (LB): 55 Andre Collins OLB; 98 Canute Curtis OLB; 51 Gerald Dixon OLB; 50 James Francis OLB; 91 Billy Granville ILB; 56 Ricardo McDonald ILB; 58 Steve Tovar ILB; 57 Reinard Wilson OLB; Defensive backs (DB): 33 Ashley Ambrose CB; 30 Cory Gilliard FS; 34 Tremain Mack SS; 31 Greg Myers FS/PR; 26 Bo Orlando FS; 27 Tito Paul CB; 23 Corey Sawyer CB; 35 Sam Shade SS; 22 Jimmy Spencer CB; 42 Lawrence Wright SS; Special teams (ST): 11 Lee Johnson P; 9 Doug Pelfrey K; 59 Greg Truitt LS	Practice squad: -- Bill Kushner P; Reserve: 41 Scottie Graham RB (IR); 81 Carl Pickens WR (IR); 79 Ramondo Stallings DE (IR); 52 Tim Terry LB (IR); 53 Tom Tumulty LB (IR); 53 active, 5 inactive, 1 practice squad, 1 exemption Rookies in italics

== Regular season ==
=== Schedule ===
Week	Date	Opponent	Result	Record	Venue	Attendance
1	August 31	Arizona Cardinals	**W** 24–21	1–0	Cinergy Field	53,644
2	September 7	at **Baltimore Ravens**	**L** 10–23	1–1	Memorial Stadium	52,968
3	Bye					
4	September 21	at Denver Broncos	**L** 20–38	1–2	Mile High Stadium	73,871
5	September 28	New York Jets	**L** 14–31	1–3	Cinergy Field	57,209
6	October 5	at **Jacksonville Jaguars**	**L** 13–21	1–4	Alltel Stadium	67,128
7	October 12	at **Tennessee Oilers**	**L** 7–30	1–5	Liberty Bowl Memorial Stadium	17,071
8	October 19	**Pittsburgh Steelers**	**L** 10–26	1–6	Cinergy Field	60,020
9	October 26	at New York Giants	**L** 27–29	1–7	Giants Stadium	72,584
10	November 2	San Diego Chargers	**W** 38–31	2–7	Cinergy Field	53,754
11	November 9	at Indianapolis Colts	**W** 28–13	3–7	RCA Dome	58,473
12	November 16	at **Pittsburgh Steelers**	**L** 3–20	3–8	Three Rivers Stadium	55,226
13	November 23	**Jacksonville Jaguars**	**W** 31–26	4–8	Cinergy Field	55,158
14	November 30	at Philadelphia Eagles	**L** 42–44	4–9	Veterans Stadium	66,623
15	December 4	**Tennessee Oilers**	**W** 41–14	5–9	Cinergy Field	49,086
16	December 14	Dallas Cowboys	**W** 31–24	6–9	Cinergy Field	60,043
17	December 21	**Baltimore Ravens**	**W** 16–14	7–9	Cinergy Field	50,917
Note: Intra-division opponents are in **bold** text.

=== Standings ===
AFC Central
	W	L	T	PCT	PF	PA	STK
^{(2)} Pittsburgh Steelers	11	5	0	.688	372	307	L1
^{(5)} Jacksonville Jaguars	11	5	0	.688	394	318	W2
Tennessee Oilers	8	8	0	.500	333	310	W1
Cincinnati Bengals	7	9	0	.438	355	405	W3
Baltimore Ravens	6	9	1	.406	326	345	L1

== Team leaders ==
=== Passing ===
Player	Att	Comp	Yds	TD	INT	Rating
Jeff Blake	317	184	2125	8	7	77.6
Boomer Esiason	186	118	1478	13	2	106.9

=== Rushing ===
Player	Att	Yds	YPC	Long	TD
Corey Dillon	233	1129	4.8	66	10

=== Receiving ===
Player	Rec	Yds	Avg	Long	TD
Darnay Scott	54	797	14.8	77	5
Tony McGee	34	414	12.2	37	6

=== Defense ===
Player	Tackles	Sacks	INTs	FF	FR
Sam Shade	96	4.0	1	1	1
Gerald Dixon	50	8.5	0	1	0
Corey Sawyer	31	0.0	4	0	0

=== Kicking and punting ===
Player	FGA	FGM	FG%	XPA	XPM	XP%	Points
Doug Pelfrey	16	12	75.0%	43	41	95.3%	77

Player	Punts	Yards	Long	Blkd	Avg.
Lee Johnson	81	3471	66	0	42.9

=== Special teams ===
Player	KR	KRYards	KRAvg	KRLong	KRTD	PR	PRYards	PRAvg	PRLong	PRTD
Eric Bieniemy	34	789	23.2	102	1	0	0	0.0	0	0
Greg Myers	0	0	0.0	0	0	26	201	7.7	18	0

== Awards and records ==
- Corey Dillon, Franchise Record (since broken), Most Rushing Yards in One Game, 246 yards vs. Tennessee Oilers (achieved on December 4, 1997)
- Corey Dillon, Rookie Record (since broken), Most Rushing Yards in One Game, 246 yards vs. Tennessee Oilers (achieved on December 4, 1997)
- Corey Dillon, Franchise Record (tied), Most Points in One Game, 24 Points vs. Tennessee Oilers (achieved on December 4, 1997)
- Corey Dillon, Franchise Record (tied), Most Touchdowns in One Game, 4 TD's vs. Tennessee Oilers (achieved on December 4, 1997)

=== Milestones ===
- Corey Dillon, 1st 1000 yard rushing season (1,129 rushing yards)
