= Harold Green (American football) =

American football player (born 1968)

No. 28, 30
- Position: Running back

Personal information
- Born: January 29, 1968 (age 58); Ladson, South Carolina, U.S.
- Listed height: 6 ft 2 in (1.88 m)
- Listed weight: 222 lb (101 kg)

Career information
- High school: Stratford (Goose Creek, South Carolina)
- College: South Carolina
- NFL draft: 1990: 2nd round, 38th overall pick

Career history
- Cincinnati Bengals (1990–1995); St. Louis Rams (1996); Atlanta Falcons (1997–1998)

Awards and highlights
- Pro Bowl (1992); First Team All-South Independent (1989); Second Team All-South Independent (1987)

Career NFL statistics
- Rushing yards: 4,365
- Rushing average: 3.8
- Rushing touchdowns: 13
- Stats at Pro Football Reference

Harold Green Jr. (born January 29, 1968), is an American former professional football player who was a running back in the National Football League (NFL). He was selected by the Cincinnati Bengals in the 2nd round of the 1990 NFL draft.

He attended Stratford High School in Goose Creek, SC. A 6'2", 222-lb running back, he played college football for the South Carolina Gamecocks, where he rushed for 2,617 yards, caught 76 passes for 661 yards, and scored 26 touchdowns in three seasons.

Pre-draft measurables
Height	Weight	Arm length	Hand span	40-yard dash	10-yard split	20-yard split	20-yard shuttle	Vertical jump	Broad jump	Bench press
6 ft 1 1/2 in (1.87 m)	216 lb (98 kg)	31 5/8 in (0.80 m)	10 in (0.25 m)	4.74 s	1.64 s	2.76 s	4.25 s	32.0 in (0.81 m)	9 ft 10 in (3.00 m)	16 reps
All values from NFL Combine

Green played nine NFL seasons from 1990 to 1998. His best year as a pro came during the 1992 season as a member of the Bengals, rushing for 1,170 yards with 41 receptions. However, in 1993 Green averaged just 2.74 yards per carry, which is the record for lowest yards per carry among running backs with more than 200 rushing attempts in a season.

== NFL career statistics ==
Year	Team	GP	Att	Yds	Avg	Lng	TD	Rec	Yds	Avg	Lng	TD
1990	CIN	12	83	353	4.3	39	1	12	90	7.5	22	1
1991	CIN	14	158	731	4.6	75	2	16	136	8.5	18	0
1992	CIN	16	265	1,170	4.4	53	2	41	214	5.2	19	0
1993	CIN	15	215	589	2.7	25	0	22	115	5.2	16	0
1994	CIN	14	76	223	2.9	22	1	27	267	9.9	34	1
1995	CIN	15	171	661	3.9	23	2	27	182	6.7	24	1
1996	STL	16	127	523	4.1	35	4	37	246	6.6	19	1
1997	ATL	16	36	78	2.2	22	1	29	360	12.4	47	0
1998	ATL	6	20	37	1.9	6	0	2	34	17.0	28	0
Career		124	1,151	4,365	3.8	75	13	213	1,644	7.7	47	4
