= Doug Pelfrey =

American football player (born 1970)

No. 9
- Position: Placekicker

Personal information
- Born: September 25, 1970 (age 56); Fort Thomas, Kentucky, U.S.
- Listed height: 5 ft 11 in (1.80 m)
- Listed weight: 185 lb (84 kg)

Career information
- High school: Scott (Taylor Mill, Kentucky)
- College: Kentucky
- NFL draft: 1993: 8th round, 202nd overall pick

Career history
- Cincinnati Bengals (1993–1999)

Awards and highlights
- "Whizzer" White NFL Man of the Year Award (1999); First-team All-SEC (1991); Second-team All-SEC (1992); Inducted into KY Pro Football HOF (2005)

Career NFL statistics
- Field goals made: 153
- Field goals attempted: 198
- Field goal %: 77.3
- Longest field goal: 54
- Career points: 660
- Stats at Pro Football Reference

William Douglas Pelfrey (born September 25, 1970) is an American former professional football player who was a placekicker for the Cincinnati Bengals of the National Football League (NFL). He was selected by the Bengals in the eighth round of the 1993 NFL draft. Pelfrey played college football for the Kentucky Wildcats.

== Professional career ==
In 1997, Pelfrey surpassed Horst Muhlmann's record for consecutive extra points (101) by a Cincinnati Bengals kicker.

Pelfrey is also known for his charitable work, starting the Kicks for Kids Foundation to help children in the Greater Cincinnati area pursue their dreams.

Pelfrey is the only player to kick two field goals (including a career-best 54-yarder as time expired) within six seconds to win a game - 1994 Week 16, Philadelphia Eagles at Cincinnati Bengals.

In 1996, Pelfrey became the most accurate kicker in NFL history. As of 2019, his 77.2 career FG percentage ranked 68th in NFL history.

== NFL career statistics ==
Year	Team	GP	Field goals				Extra points			Points
Year	Team	GP	FGA	FGM	Pct	Lng	XPA	XPM	Pct	Points
1993	CIN	15	31	24	77.4	53	16	13	81.3	85
1994	CIN	16	33	28	84.8	54	25	24	96.0	108
1995	CIN	16	36	29	80.6	51	34	34	100.0	121
1996	CIN	16	28	23	82.1	49	41	41	100.0	110
1997	CIN	16	16	12	75.0	46	43	41	95.3	77
1998	CIN	16	27	19	70.4	51	21	21	100.0	78
1999	CIN	16	27	18	66.7	50	27	27	100.0	81
Career		111	198	153	77.3	54	207	201	97.1	660
