= Lee Johnson (punter) =

American football player (born 1961)

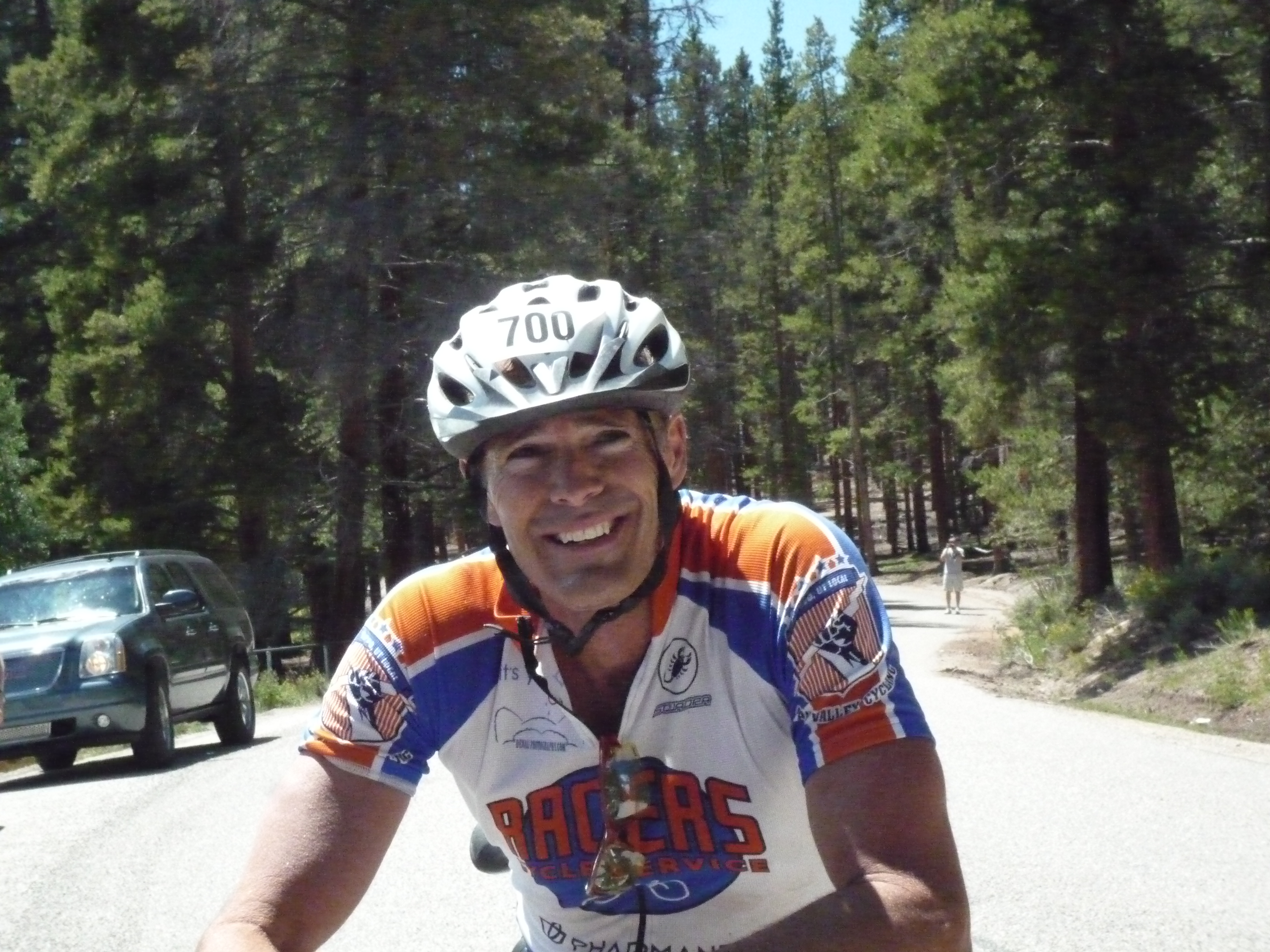
- Johnson in Leadville in 2010

No. 10, 11, 12, 6
- Position: Punter

Personal information
- Born: November 27, 1961 (age 64); Conroe, Texas, U.S.
- Listed height: 6 ft 2 in (1.88 m)
- Listed weight: 202 lb (92 kg)

Career information
- High school: McCullough (The Woodlands, Texas)
- College: BYU
- NFL draft: 1985: 5th round, 138th overall pick

Career history
- Houston Oilers (1985–1987); Cleveland Browns (1987–1988); Cincinnati Bengals (1988–1998); New England Patriots (1999–2001); Minnesota Vikings (2001); Philadelphia Eagles (2002)

Awards and highlights
- Super Bowl champion (XXXVI); Cincinnati Bengals 40th Anniversary Team; National champion (1984); Second-team All-WAC (1984)

Career NFL statistics
- Punts: 1,226
- Punt yards: 51,979
- Punt average: 42.4
- Stats at Pro Football Reference

Leland Eric Johnson (born November 27, 1961) is an American former professional football player who was a punter for 18 seasons in the National Football League (NFL). He played college football for the BYU Cougars and was selected by the Houston Oilers in the fifth round of the 1985 NFL draft. He later played for the Cleveland Browns, Cincinnati Bengals, New England Patriots, Minnesota Vikings, and Philadelphia Eagles.

== Early life and college ==
Johnson was born in Conroe, Texas, and was a punter and kicker for McCullough High School in The Woodlands, Texas.

Johnson was a punter at Brigham Young University and was a member of their 1984 national championship team. He was nicknamed "Thunderfoot" while at BYU.

== Professional career ==
After graduating college, Johnson was selected by the Houston Oilers in the fifth round of the 1985 NFL draft.

In his 18 seasons, Johnson played in 259 games and recorded 1,226 punts for 51,979 yards and 317 punts in the 20, with 142 touchbacks. His 70-yard punt in 1990 was the longest of the season, and he led the NFL with a 38.5 net yard average in 1995. At the time of his retirement, his 51,979 punting yards were the third most in NFL history behind Sean Landeta and Jeff Feagles.

Johnson's most successful years in the NFL were with the Bengals, where he spent 11 of his 18 seasons and made a championship game appearance in Super Bowl XXIII. In that game, Johnson set a record for the longest punt in Super Bowl history (63 yards). By 1998, Johnson had become extremely frustrated with Cincinnati, which had not recorded a winning season since 1990. After a 33–20 loss at home during the 1998 season, Johnson publicly denounced Bengals management and said if he was a Cincinnati fan with season tickets, he would probably sell them. Johnson was cut by the Bengals the following day, and subsequently signed with the Patriots in the following season. He left the Bengals as their all-time leading punter with 746 punts for 32,196 yards and 186 punts in the 20.

Johnson was the Patriots punter for the next two years, but was cut by the team five games into the 2001 season. He spent the rest of the year with the Vikings and played his final season with the Eagles before retiring from the NFL at age 41.

== NFL career statistics ==
Legend
	Won the Super Bowl
	Led the league
**Bold**	Career high

=== Regular season ===
Year	Team	Punting									
Year	Team	GP	Punts	Yds	Net Yds	Lng	Avg	Net Avg	Blk	Ins20	TB
1985	HOU	**16**	83	3,464	2,959	65	41.7	35.7	0	22	8
1986	HOU	**16**	88	3,623	3,140	66	41.2	35.7	0	26	9
1987	HOU	9	41	1,652	1,349	59	40.3	32.9	0	5	3
1987	CLE	3	9	317	291	66	35.2	32.3	0	3	1
1988	CLE	3	17	643	-	61	37.8	-	0	0	0
1988	CIN	12	14	594	514	52	42.4	36.7	0	4	1
1989	CIN	**16**	61	2,446	1,903	62	40.1	30.2	**2**	14	11
1990	CIN	**16**	64	2,705	2,193	70	42.3	34.3	0	12	8
1991	CIN	**16**	64	2,795	2,219	62	43.7	34.7	0	15	6
1992	CIN	**16**	76	3,196	2,732	64	42.1	35.9	0	15	9
1993	CIN	**16**	**90**	**3,954**	3,298	60	43.9	36.6	0	24	12
1994	CIN	**16**	79	3,461	2,822	64	43.8	35.3	1	19	9
1995	CIN	**16**	68	2,861	2,627	61	42.1	**38.6**	0	26	4
1996	CIN	**16**	80	3,630	2,788	67	**45.4**	34.4	1	16	**17**
1997	CIN	**16**	81	3,471	2,904	66	42.9	35.9	0	27	8
1998	CIN	13	69	3,083	2,495	69	44.7	35.6	1	14	8
1999	NWE	**16**	**90**	3,735	3,110	58	41.5	34.6	0	23	14
2000	NWE	**16**	89	3,798	**3,314**	62	42.7	36.8	1	**31**	5
2001	NWE	5	24	1,045	920	**76**	43.5	38.3	0	3	3
2001	MIN	4	25	983	859	59	39.3	34.4	0	9	3
2002	PHI	2	14	523	388	53	37.4	27.7	0	4	2
Career		259	1,226	51,979	42,825	76	42.4	34.8	6	312	141

=== Playoffs ===
Year	Team	Punting									
Year	Team	GP	Punts	Yds	Net Yds	Lng	Avg	Net Avg	Blk	Ins20	TB
1987	CLE	2	3	133	120	59	44.3	40.0	0	1	0
1988	CIN	**3**	**17**	**718**	**630**	63	42.2	37.1	0	**7**	0
1990	CIN	2	8	393	334	**64**	**49.1**	**41.8**	0	1	0
2002	PHI	2	12	486	448	**64**	40.5	37.3	0	6	0
Career		9	40	1,730	1,532	64	43.3	38.3	0	15	0

== Post-football ==
Johnson is a mountain cyclist, having competed in the Leadville 100 nine times, with a personal best time of 9 hours 27 minutes. Johnson owns a barbecue restaurant, Five Star BBQ, with two others, in Orem, Utah.
