= David White (American football) =

American football player (born 1970)

No. 51, 50, 34, 29
- Positions: Linebacker, fullback

Personal information
- Born: February 27, 1970 (age 56); Oak Ridge, Tennessee, U.S.
- Listed height: 6 ft 2 in (1.88 m)
- Listed weight: 235 lb (107 kg)

Career information
- High school: St. Augustine (New Orleans, Louisiana)
- College: Nebraska
- NFL draft: 1993: undrafted

Career history
- Buffalo Bills (1993)*; New England Patriots (1993); Buffalo Bills (1995–1996); Buffalo Destroyers (1999–2000); Toronto Phantoms (2001); Georgia Force (2002); Tampa Bay Storm (2002–2005)
- * Offseason or practice squad member only

Awards and highlights
- ArenaBowl champion (2003)

Career NFL statistics
- Tackles: 29
- Sacks: 1.5
- Interceptions: 1
- Forced fumbles: 1
- Fumble recoveries: 3
- Touchdowns: 1
- Stats at Pro Football Reference

Career AFL statistics
- Tackles: 62
- Sacks: 4
- Passes defended: 16
- Forced fumbles: 4
- Stats at ArenaFan.com

David Maurice White (born February 27, 1970) is an American former professional gridiron football linebacker and fullback who played in the National Football League (NFL) and Arena Football League (AFL). He played college football at Nebraska.

== Early life ==
White was born in Oak Ridge, Tennessee and grew up in New Orleans, Louisiana, where he attended St. Augustine High School. He played defensive end, linebacker and tight end at St. Augustine and was named All-Metro as a senior after catching 15 passes for 225 yards.

== College career ==
White was a member of the Nebraska Cornhuskers for four seasons, playing as key reserve and occasional starter at linebacker. White's most productive season was as a junior in 1991, when he made 42 total tackles (six for loss) and finished second on the team with five sacks. White finished his collegiate career with eight sacks and one interception.

== Professional career ==
After not being selected in the 1993 NFL draft, White was signed by the New England Patriots as a undrafted free agent in 1993. He made the team out of training camp but was released on September 30 and later re-signed by the team towards the end of the season. White was cut during training camp the following season. White was signed by the Buffalo Bills prior to the 1995 season. He spent two seasons with the team.

After a few years out of football, White was signed by the newly formed Buffalo Destroyers of the Arena Football League (AFL) to play linebacker and fullback. After two season with Buffalo, he spent one season as a member of the Toronto Phantoms and started the 2002 season with the Georgia Force before he was traded to the Tampa Bay Storm. White was a member of the Storm for three and a half seasons, including the ArenaBowl XVII championship team, before retiring from professional football after the 2005 season. White rushed for 48 touchdowns and scored one receiving touchdown while in the AFL.

== Post-football career ==
Since his retirement from football, White has worked in the administration at State University of New York at Fredonia.
