= Danny Stubbs =

American football player (born 1965)

Daniel Stubbs
No. 96, 67, 93
- Position: Defensive end

Personal information
- Born: January 3, 1965 (age 61); Long Branch, New Jersey, U.S.
- Listed height: 6 ft 4 in (1.93 m)
- Listed weight: 265 lb (120 kg)

Career information
- High school: Red Bank Regional (Little Silver, New Jersey)
- College: Miami (FL)
- NFL draft: 1988: 2nd round, 33rd overall pick

Career history
- San Francisco 49ers (1988–1989); Dallas Cowboys (1990–1991); Cincinnati Bengals (1991–1993); Philadelphia Eagles (1995); Miami Dolphins (1996–1998)

Awards and highlights
- 2× Super Bowl champion (XXIII, XXIV); PFWA All-Rookie Team (1988); National champion (1987); Unanimous All-American (1987); Second-team All-American (1986)

Career NFL statistics
- Tackles: 227
- Sacks: 51.5
- Forced fumbles: 9
- Stats at Pro Football Reference

Daniel Stubbs II (born January 3, 1965) is an American former professional football player who was a defensive end in the National Football League (NFL) for the San Francisco 49ers, Dallas Cowboys, Cincinnati Bengals, Philadelphia Eagles, and Miami Dolphins. He played college football for the Miami Hurricanes, earning unanimous All-American honors in 1987.

== Early life and college ==
Stubbs attended Red Bank Regional High School in Little Silver, New Jersey. He was a three-year starter in football. He also was a standout in basketball, finishing with a school-record 74 careers blocks, while leading his team to a state basketball title as a junior.

He was recruited by Howard Schnellenberger to play college football at the University of Miami, but Schnellenberger left for the USFL before his freshman season started, making Jimmy Johnson his new head coach.

As a sophomore, he was moved from outside linebacker to defensive end, becoming a starter midway through the season and finishing with a team-best 12 sacks.

His production as a junior was even better, as Stubbs tallied 97 tackles and 17 sacks. He earned second-team All-American honors for a Hurricanes team that finished was narrowly defeated at the 1987 Fiesta Bowl by Penn State 14–10 for the National Championship.

Noted as a defensive stalwart as a senior in 1987, opposing offenses tried to steer plays away from Stubbs direction, but he still posted 75 tackles and 9.5 sacks and helped the team win their second National Championship. The season was punctuated by a 20–14 win over Oklahoma in the 1988 Orange Bowl. He was named a unanimous All-American and selected to play in the Japan Bowl in Tokyo.

=== Hurricane legacy ===
Stubbs finished his college career as the school's all-time career (39 1/2) and single season (17 in 1986) sack leader. He also had 25 tackles for loss, 267 total tackles and the school record for his position with 139 assisted tackles.

In 1999, Stubbs was inducted into the University of Miami Sports Hall of Fame.

== Professional career ==
=== San Francisco 49ers ===
Stubbs was selected by the San Francisco 49ers in the second round (33rd overall) of the 1988 NFL draft. As a rookie, he was a situational pass rusher behind Kevin Fagan and Larry Roberts. He registered 25 tackles, 6 sacks, one pass defensed and was named to the NFL All-Rookie team.

In 1989, he posted 13 tackles and 4.5 sacks. In the Super Bowl XXIV victory over the Denver Broncos, he had 2 sacks and returned a fumble recovery to the one-yard line to set up a 49ers touchdown.

On April 19, 1990, he was traded along with Terrence Flagler, a third (#81-Craig Veasey) and an eleventh-round (#304-Myron Jones) draft pick to the Dallas Cowboys, in exchange for a second (#47-Dennis Brown) and third-round (#68-Ron Lewis) draft choices.

=== Dallas Cowboys ===
In 1990, he reunited with head coach Jimmy Johnson. He was named the starter at left defensive end and finished tied with defensive tackle Jimmie Jones for the team lead with 7 1/2 sacks, while also tallying 59 tackles, 30 quarterback pressures (led the team), 6 passes defensed and 2 forced fumbles.

The next year, he had a contract holdout and was passed over on the depth chart by Tony Tolbert. He was waived nine games into the season on November 4, 1991.

=== Cincinnati Bengals ===
On November 6, 1991, he was claimed off waivers by the Cincinnati Bengals and had a career-high 9 sacks (second on the team). The next year, he led the team with 5 sacks, while playing mostly in passing situations. On August 16, 1994, he was released in a salary-cap move.

=== Philadelphia Eagles ===
On April 7, 1995, he was signed as a free agent by the Philadelphia Eagles, reuniting him with Ray Rhodes, a former defensive assistant with the 49ers. He started 6 games and had 5 1/2 sacks (tied for fourth on the team).

=== Miami Dolphins ===
On April 4, 1996, he rejected an offer from the Eagles and signed instead a one-year contract with the Miami Dolphins, reuniting with Jimmy Johnson. He started 15 games at right defensive end and finished with 9 sacks (second on the team).

The next year, he was re-signed, but after not missing any games during his career, he was lost for the season with a right knee injury he suffered in the season opener. In 1998, his play suffered because of injuries, managing 2 tackles and no sacks. He was released in February 1999.

=== NFL statistics ===
Year	Team	Games	Combined tackles	Tackles	Assisted tackles	Sacks	Forced fumbles	Fumble recoveries	Fumble return yards	Interceptions	Interception return yards	Yards per interception return	Longest interception return	Interceptions returned for touchdown	Passes defended
1988	SF	16	0	0	0	6.0	0	0	0	0	0	0	0	0	0
1989	SF	16	0	0	0	4.5	0	0	0	0	0	0	0	0	0
1990	DAL	16	0	0	0	7.5	0	0	0	0	0	0	0	0	0
1991	DAL	9	0	0	0	1.0	0	1	0	0	0	0	0	0	0
1991	CIN	7	0	0	0	3.0	0	0	0	0	0	0	0	0	0
1992	CIN	16	0	0	0	9.0	0	1	0	0	0	0	0	0	0
1993	CIN	16	24	20	4	5.0	0	1	0	0	0	0	0	0	0
1995	PHI	16	21	19	2	5.5	1	1	0	0	0	0	0	0	4
1996	MIA	16	33	30	3	9.0	2	0	0	0	0	0	0	0	0
1997	MIA	1	3	3	0	1.0	0	0	0	0	0	0	0	0	0
1998	MIA	5	4	2	2	0.0	0	0	0	0	0	0	0	0	1
Career		134	85	74	11	51.5	3	4	0	0	0	0	0	0	5

== Personal life ==
The Stubbs Sandwich is a food item named in his honor, that is sold in a restaurant chain in Coppell, Texas and heavily endorsed by John Madden. On February 3, 2012, because of injuries sustained while playing, Stubbs entered into a lawsuit in the US District Court for the Eastern District of Pennsylvania against the National Football League (NFL).
