= 1993 Cleveland Browns season =

48th season in franchise history

- Owner: Art Modell
- Head coach: Bill Belichick
- Defensive coordinator: Nick Saban
- Home stadium: Cleveland Municipal Stadium

Results
- Record: 7–9
- Division place: 3rd AFC Central
- Playoffs: Did not qualify
- Pro Bowlers: DT Michael Dean Perry; KR Eric Metcalf

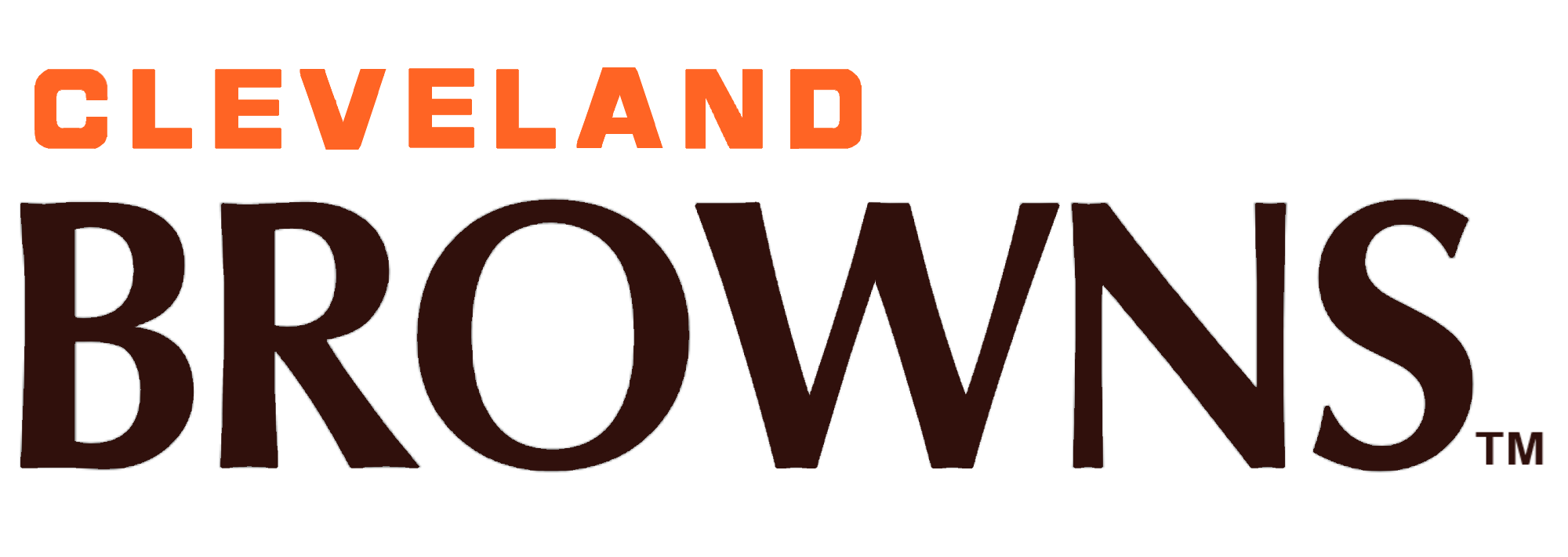
Primay script logo used by the Cleveland Browns, 1975-1995

The 1993 Cleveland Browns season was the team's 44th season with the National Football League. This season was notable for coach Bill Belichick deciding to bench, and then ultimately release, longtime starting quarterback Bernie Kosar in favor of Vinny Testaverde. Kosar resurfaced during the season with the Dallas Cowboys, when he was part of the eventual Super Bowl champions as a fill-in for injured quarterback Troy Aikman.

The Browns got off to a 5–2 start despite the quarterback controversy. Prior to the start of the season the Browns signed free agent quarterback Vinny Testaverde. Originally Testaverde was supposed to back-up his former University of Miami teammate Kosar. However, when Testaverde performed better when given the opportunity to play some felt there should be a change at the quarterback position.

However, the Browns went beyond that by unceremoniously releasing Kosar in the middle of the season. The Browns lost their next four games and seven of their last nine to finish with a 7–9 record.

== NFL draft ==
- Traded 1x11 to Denver Broncos for 1x14 and 3x83
- 1x14: C Steve Everitt
- 2x42: DE Dan Footman
- Traded 3rd Rounder to Detroit Lions for DT Jerry Ball
- 3x83: LB Mike Caldwell
- Traded 4th Rounder to Chicago Bears for C Jay Hilgenberg
- 5x124: OT Herman Arvie
- 6x153: LB Rich McKenzie
- 7x180: LB Travis Hill
- Traded 8th Rounder to Los Angeles Rams for LB Frank Stams

== Personnel ==
=== Staff ===
1993 Cleveland Browns staff
Front office: Owner and president – Art Modell; Director of player personnel – Michael Lombardi; Director of College Scouting – Dom Anile; Head coaches: Head coach – Bill Belichick; Offensive coaches: Running backs – Steve Crosby; Wide receivers – Richard Mann; Tight ends – Mike Sheppard; Offensive line – Kirk Ferentz; Assistant offensive line/tight ends - Pat Hill; Offensive assistant – Ernie Adams	Defensive coaches: Defensive coordinator – Nick Saban; Defensive line – John Mitchell; Outside linebackers – Woody Widenhofer; Inside linebackers – Jim Bates; Defensive assistant - Phil Savage; Special teams coaches: Special teams – Scott O'Brien; Coaching Assistant – Kevin Spencer; Strength and conditioning: Strength and conditioning – Jerry Simmons; Assistant strength/pass rush consultant - Joe Kim

=== Roster ===
1993 Cleveland Browns roster
Quarterbacks (QB): 8 Brad Goebel; 17 Todd Philcox; 12 Vinny Testaverde; Running backs (RB): 23 Randy Baldwin; 33 Leroy Hoard; 34 Kevin Mack; 21 Eric Metcalf; 44 Tommy Vardell FB; 26 Ron Wolfley FB; Wide receivers (WR): 83 Mark Carrier; 81 Michael Jackson; 87 Keenan McCardell; 86 Patrick Rowe; 84 Rico Smith; Tight ends (TE): 88 Brian Kinchen LS; 80 Thomas McLemore; 49 Clarence Williams	Offensive linemen (OL): 73 Herman Arvie T; 72 Bob Dahl G; 61 Steve Everitt C; 64 Houston Hoover G; 66 Tony Jones T; 68 Ed King G; 69 Rod Milstead G; 61 Gene Williams T; 67 Wally Williams G; Defensive linemen (DL): 93 Jerry Ball DT; 90 Rob Burnett; 78 Dan Footman DE; 94 Bill Johnson DT; 96 James Jones DT; 92 Michael Dean Perry DT; 98 Anthony Pleasant DE; 75 Pio Sagapolutele DE	Linebackers (LB): 56 Mike Caldwell OLB; 51 Gerald Dixon OLB; 59 Mike Johnson MLB; 52 Pepper Johnson OLB; 57 Clay Matthews OLB; 99 Rich McKenzie OLB; 50 Frank Stams OLB; 54 Eddie Sutter MLB; Defensive backs (DB): 31 Stacey Hairston CB; 39 Randy Hilliard CB; 41 Tim Jacobs CB; 22 Selwyn Jones CB; 27 Stevon Moore SS; 48 Najee Mustafaa CB; 42 Louis Riddick SS; 43 Del Speer FS; 29 Eric Turner FS; Special teams (ST): 11 Brian Hansen P; 3 Matt Stover K	Practice squad: -- Greg Briggs S; 71 Jerome Brown DT; 2 Kerry Ferrell WR; Reserve: 77 Orlando Brown T (IR); 52 Richard Brown LB (IR); 38 Bernard Ellison CB (IR); 93 Travis Hill LB (PUP); 24 Terry Taylor CB (IR); 85 Lawyer Tillman WR (IR); 53 active, 6 inactive, 3 practice squad Rookies in italics

== Schedule ==
Week	Date	Opponent	Result	Record	Venue	Attendance
1	September 5	**Cincinnati Bengals**	**W** 27–14	1–0	Cleveland Municipal Stadium	75,508
2	September 13	San Francisco 49ers	**W** 23–13	2–0	Cleveland Municipal Stadium	78,218
3	September 19	at Los Angeles Raiders	**W** 19–16	3–0	Los Angeles Memorial Coliseum	48,617
4	September 26	at Indianapolis Colts	**L** 10–23	3–1	Hoosier Dome	59,654
5	Bye					
6	October 10	Miami Dolphins	**L** 14–24	3–2	Cleveland Municipal Stadium	78,138
7	October 17	at **Cincinnati Bengals**	**W** 28–17	4–2	Riverfront Stadium	55,647
8	October 24	**Pittsburgh Steelers**	**W** 28–23	5–2	Cleveland Municipal Stadium	78,118
9	Bye					
10	November 7	Denver Broncos	**L** 14–29	5–3	Cleveland Municipal Stadium	77,818
11	November 14	at Seattle Seahawks	**L** 5–22	5–4	Kingdome	54,622
12	November 21	**Houston Oilers**	**L** 20–27	5–5	Cleveland Municipal Stadium	71,668
13	November 28	at Atlanta Falcons	**L** 14–17	5–6	Georgia Dome	54,510
14	December 5	New Orleans Saints	**W** 17–13	6–6	Cleveland Municipal Stadium	60,388
15	December 12	at **Houston Oilers**	**L** 17–19	6–7	Houston Astrodome	58,720
16	December 19	New England Patriots	**L** 17–20	6–8	Cleveland Municipal Stadium	48,618
17	December 26	at Los Angeles Rams	**W** 42–14	7–8	Anaheim Stadium	34,155
18	January 2, 1994	at **Pittsburgh Steelers**	**L** 9–16	7–9	Three Rivers Stadium	49,208
Note: Intra-division opponents are in **bold** text.

== Season summary ==
=== Week 3 at Raiders ===
Week Three: Cleveland Browns (2–0) at Los Angeles Raiders (2–0)

Quarter	1	2	3	4	Total
Browns	0	0	0	19	19
Raiders	10	3	0	3	16

at Los Angeles Memorial Coliseum, Los Angeles, California

- Date: September 19, 1993
- Game time: 4:00 p.m. EDT
- Game weather: Sunny, 66 °F (19 °C)
- Game attendance: 48,617
- TV announcers (NBC): Marv Albert and Paul Maguire
- Box Score, Box Score

Team	Category	Player	Statistics
Browns	Passing	Vinny Testaverde	10/22, 159 Yds, TD, INT
Browns	Rushing	Tommy Vardell	14 Rush, 104 Yds
Browns	Receiving	Mark Carrier	5 Rec, 73 Yds
Raiders	Passing	Jeff Hostetler	11/25, 94 Yds, TD
Raiders	Rushing	Greg Robinson	18 Rush, 59 Yds
Raiders	Receiving	Steve Smith	4 Rec, 42 Yds

Scoring summary

Quarter	Time	Drive			Team	Scoring information	Score	
Quarter	Time	Plays	Yards	TOP	Team	Scoring information	CLE	LA
1	9:22				Raiders	Andrew Glover 2-yard touchdown reception from Jeff Hostetler, Jeff Jaeger kick good	0	7
1	1:07				Raiders	24-yard field goal by Jeff Jaeger	0	10
2	12:12				Raiders	27-yard field goal by Jeff Jaeger	0	13
4	8:23				Browns	32-yard field goal by Matt Stover	3	13
4	4:58				Raiders	53-yard field goal by Jeff Jaeger	3	16
4	2:26				Browns	Lawyer Tillman 12-yard touchdown reception from Vinny Testaverde, Matt Stover kick good	10	16
4	1:41				Raiders	Safety, Jeff Gossett ran out of end zone	12	16
4	0:02				Browns	Eric Metcalf 1-yard touchdown run, Matt Stover kick good	19	16
"TOP" = time of possession. For other American football terms, see Glossary of American football.							19	16

=== Week 7 ===
Team	1	2	3	4	Total
Steelers	0	14	6	3	23
• Browns	0	14	7	7	28

- Date: October 24
- Location: Cleveland Municipal Stadium, Cleveland, Ohio
- Game start: 4:00 p.m.
- Game attendance: 78,118
- Game weather: 54 °F or 12.2 °C; wind 14 miles per hour (23 km/h; 12 kn)

Scoring summary
Q2	CLE	Michael Jackson 62 yard pass from Vinny Testaverde (Matt Stover kick)	CLE 7–0
Q2	CLE	Eric Metcalf 91 yard punt return (Matt Stover kick)	CLE 14–0
Q2	PIT	Barry Foster 4 yard run (Gary Anderson kick)	CLE 14–7
Q2	PIT	Barry Foster 1 yard run (Gary Anderson kick)	Tie 14–14
Q3	PIT	Gary Anderson 30 yard field goal	PIT 17–14
Q3	CLE	Ron Wolfley 4 yard pass from Vinny Testaverde (Matt Stover kick)	CLE 21–17
Q3	PIT	Gary Anderson 46 yard field goal	CLE 21–20
Q4	PIT	Gary Anderson 30 yard field goal	PIT 23–21
Q4	CLE	Eric Metcalf 75 yard punt return (Matt Stover kick)	CLE 28–23

=== Week 13: at Atlanta ===
Week 13: Cleveland Browns at Atlanta Falcons – Game summary

Quarter	1	2	3	4	Total
Browns	0	0	7	7	14
Falcons	10	7	0	0	17

at Georgia Dome, Atlanta

- Date: November 28
- Game time: 1:00 p.m. EST
- Game weather: indoors
- Game attendance: 54,510
- TV announcers (NBC): Drew Goodman (play–by–play) and Beasley Reece (color commentator)

Game information

First quarter

- ATL (3:25) – Johnson 51 yard field goal
  Falcons 3, Browns 0
- ATL (14:23) – Rison 14 yard pass from Hebert (Johnson kick)
  Falcons 10, Browns 0

Second quarter

- ATL (10:14) – Pritchard 8 yard pass from Hebert (Johnson kick)
  Falcons 17, Browns 0

Third quarter

- CLE (15:00) – Philcox (Stover kick)
  Falcons 17, Browns 7

Fourth quarter

- CLE (11:29) – Philcox 3 yard rush (Stover kick)
  Falcons 17, Browns 14

Top passers

- CLE – Todd Philcox 14/26, 207 yds, 1 TD
- ATL – Bobby Hebert 21/29, 214 yds, 2 TD

Top rushers

- CLE – Eric Metcalf 13 carr, 61 yds
- ATL – Erric Pegram 22 carr, 58 yds

Top receivers

- CLE – Eric Metcalf 5 rec, 43 yds
- ATL – Andre Rison 5 rec, 78 yds, 1 TD

Turnovers

- CLE – 1
- ATL – 1

== Standings ==
AFC Central
	W	L	T	PCT	PF	PA	STK
^{(2)} Houston Oilers	12	4	0	.750	368	238	W11
^{(6)} Pittsburgh Steelers	9	7	0	.563	308	281	W1
Cleveland Browns	7	9	0	.438	304	307	L1
Cincinnati Bengals	3	13	0	.188	187	319	L1
