= John Copeland =

American football player (born 1970)

No. 92
- Position: Defensive lineman

Personal information
- Born: September 20, 1970 (age 56); Lanett, Alabama, U.S.
- Listed height: 6 ft 3 in (1.91 m)
- Listed weight: 285 lb (129 kg)

Career information
- High school: Valley (Valley, Alabama)
- College: Alabama
- NFL draft: 1993: 1st round, 5th overall pick

Career history
- Cincinnati Bengals (1993–2001)

Awards and highlights
- PFWA All-Rookie Team (1993); Consensus national championship (1992); Consensus All-American (1992); First-team All-SEC (1992); Second-team All-SEC (1991)

Career NFL statistics
- Tackles: 324
- Sacks: 24
- Forced fumbles: 9
- Touchdowns: 1
- Stats at Pro Football Reference

John Anthony Copeland (born September 20, 1970) is an American former professional football player who was a defensive end in the National Football League (NFL) for eight seasons. He played college football for the University of Alabama, was recognized as an All-American and was a member of a national championship team in 1992. He was selected by the Cincinnati Bengals in the first round of the 1993 NFL draft, and he played his entire pro career for the Bengals.

== Early life ==
Copeland was born in Lanett, Alabama. He attended Valley High School in Valley, Alabama, where he played high school football for the Valley Rams.

== College career ==
Copeland initially attended Hinds Community College in Raymond, Mississippi, but later received an athletic scholarship to transfer to the University of Alabama, and played for coach Gene Stallings' Alabama Crimson Tide football teams. Paired with fellow defensive end Eric Curry on opposite ends of the Crimson Tide's defensive line, the two ends were key contributors to the team's No. 1 ranked defense in 1992, when both of Curry and Copeland were recognized as consensus first-team All-Americans. As a senior, he was a member of the Crimson Tide team that won the consensus national championship by defeating the Miami Hurricanes 34–13 in the Sugar Bowl.

== Professional career ==
The Cincinnati Bengals selected Copeland in the first round (fifth pick overall) of the 1993 NFL draft. He played for the Bengals from 1993 to 2000. In eight NFL seasons, he played in 107 regular season games, started 102 of them, and compiled 324 tackles, 24.0 quarterback sacks, nine forced fumbles, three interceptions and a touchdown on a fumble recovery .

=== NFL statistics ===
Year	Team	Games	Combined tackles	Tackles	Assisted tackles	Sacks	Forced fumbles	Fumble recoveries
1993	CIN	14	47	42	5	3.0	2	0
1994	CIN	12	40	35	5	1.0	1	0
1995	CIN	16	61	53	8	9.0	2	0
1996	CIN	13	40	33	7	3.0	1	0
1997	CIN	15	49	35	14	3.0	0	2
1998	CIN	5	5	5	0	0.0	0	0
1999	CIN	16	37	28	9	4.0	2	0
2000	CIN	16	39	32	7	1.0	0	1
Career		107	318	263	55	24.0	8	3

== Coaching ==
He was the head coach and off-season strength and conditioning coach for the Tuscaloosa Academy Knights in Tuscaloosa, Alabama but was relieved of his duties on July 29, 2020.
