= Tony McGee (tight end) =

American football player

No. 82, 80, 44
- Position: Tight end

Personal information
- Born: Terre Haute, Indiana, U.S.
- Listed height: 6 ft 4 in (1.93 m)
- Listed weight: 241 lb (109 kg)

Career information
- High school: Terre Haute South Vigo
- College: Michigan
- NFL draft: 1993: 2nd round, 37th overall pick

Career history
- Cincinnati Bengals (1993–2001); Dallas Cowboys (2002); Tampa Bay Buccaneers (2003)*; Dallas Cowboys (2003); New York Giants (2003)
- * Offseason or practice squad member only

Awards and highlights
- PFWA All-Rookie Team (1993)

Career NFL statistics
- Receptions: 322
- Receiving yards: 4,089
- Receiving touchdowns: 30
- Stats at Pro Football Reference

Tony McGee is an American former professional football player who was a tight end in the National Football League (NFL) for the Cincinnati Bengals, Dallas Cowboys and New York Giants. He played college football for the Michigan Wolverines.

== Early life ==
McGee was born in Terre Haute, Indiana,. He attended South Vigo High School in Terre Haute. As a junior, he collected 39 receptions for 890 yards.

As a senior, he was a two-way player. On offense, he played tight end, making 27 catches for 670 yards and four touchdowns, while contributing to his team posting 4,133 yards. On defense, he played defensive end and had 60 tackles, 10 sacks and nine tackles for loss. He received Chicago Sun Times Indiana Lineman of the Year and SuperPrep All-American honors. He also lettered in basketball.

== College career ==
McGee accepted a football scholarship from the University of Michigan, playing as a tight end from 1989 to 1992. As a freshman, he only saw action on special teams.

As a sophomore, McGee saw action on special teams and registered one catch for nine yards as a reserve tight end. As a junior, he appeared in every game as a reserve tight end, catching three passes for 39 yards.

Although he only had three receptions going into his senior year, he started all 12 games at tight end for the undefeated 1992 Michigan Wolverines football team that compiled a 9–0–3 record. During the 1992 season, he caught 38 passes (second on the team) for 467 yards and six receiving touchdowns (second on the team). He had the best game of his collegiate career in Michigan's victory over Washington in the 1993 Rose Bowl with six receptions for 117 yards and two touchdowns.

== Professional football ==
=== Cincinnati Bengals ===
McGee was selected by the Cincinnati Bengals in the second round (37th overall pick) of the 1993 NFL draft. As a rookie in 1993, McGee was the Bengals' starting tight end in 15 games and caught 44 passes for 525 yards. He missed the game against the Houston Oilers with a back contusion.

In 1995, McGee was reunited with his Michigan head coach Gary Moeller who joined the Bengals as an assistant coach. McGee had his best season with 55 catches (fourth in the league for tight ends) for 754 yards (third in the league for tight ends) and four touchdowns. He had a career-high 118 receiving yards against the Indianapolis Colts.

In 1997, he finished third on the team with 34 receptions for 414 yards and 6 touchdowns (third in the league for tight ends). In 1998, he began to focus more on blocking for running back Corey Dillon. In 2000, he suffered a left ankle fracture, causing him to miss the last 2 games and end his 117 consecutive starts streak.

In December 2001, the Bengals placed McGee on the injured reserve list with a sprained medial collateral ligament in his left knee. In 2002, after the drafting of tight end Matt Schobel, with McGee recovering from a knee injury and the team looking to save money under the salary cap, he was released on April 25.

He appeared in 136 games for the Bengals (134 as a starter) and caught 299 passes for 3,795 yards and 20 touchdowns. After nine years with the Bengals, he ranked seventh on the team's All-time career receptions list.

=== Dallas Cowboys (first stint) ===
On April 27, 2002, two days after being released, McGee signed with the Dallas Cowboys, reuniting with offensive coordinator Bruce Coslet, who had also served that function previously with the Bengals. He signed a three-year contract that included a $400,000 signing bonus, and base salaries of $650,000 in 2002 and $750,000 in both 2003 and 2004. He was the Cowboys' starter at tight end for all 16 games during the 2002 NFL season, catching 23 passes (third on the team) for 294 yards (third on the team) and one touchdown.

The next year, new head coach Bill Parcells signed free agent Dan Campbell and drafted future All-Pro Jason Witten, which forced his release on August 31, 2003.

=== Tampa Bay Buccaneers ===
On September 1, 2003, he was signed as a free agent by the Tampa Bay Buccaneers to replace an injured Rickey Dudley, but was cut just four days later after the signing of Daniel Wilcox.

=== Dallas Cowboys (second stint) ===
The Dallas Cowboys re-signed him on October 8, 2003, after rookie tight end Witten sustained a broken jaw and backup James Whalen injured a hamstring. He appeared in only one contest with no receptions, after Witten missed only one game and McGee was subsequently released on October 19.

=== New York Giants ===
He signed with the New York Giants on December 2, 2003, after Jeremy Shockey and Marcellus Rivers both injured their knees. He appeared in three games with no receptions and wasn't re-signed at the end of the season.

== NFL career statistics ==
Legend
**Bold**	Career high

Year	Team	Games		Receiving				
Year	Team	GP	GS	Rec	Yds	Avg	Lng	TD
1993	CIN	15	15	44	525	11.9	37	0
1994	CIN	16	16	40	492	12.3	54	1
1995	CIN	16	16	**55**	**754**	13.7	41	4
1996	CIN	16	16	38	446	11.7	22	4
1997	CIN	16	16	34	414	12.2	37	**6**
1998	CIN	16	16	22	363	**16.5**	40	1
1999	CIN	16	16	26	344	13.2	35	2
2000	CIN	14	14	26	309	11.9	39	1
2001	CIN	11	9	14	148	10.6	25	1
2002	DAL	16	16	23	294	12.8	**58**	1
2003	DAL	1	0	0	0	0.0	0	0
2003	NYG	3	0	0	0	0.0	0	0
Career		156	150	322	4,089	12.7	58	21

== Personal life ==
McGee is the CEO of the global logistics and freight forwarding company HNM Global Logistics.
