= Brad Smith (linebacker) =

American football player (born 1969)

No. 91
- Position: Linebacker

Personal information
- Born: September 5, 1969 (age 57); Houston, Texas, U.S.
- Listed height: 6 ft 2 in (1.88 m)
- Listed weight: 228 lb (103 kg)

Career information
- High school: St. Thomas (Houston)
- College: TCU
- NFL draft: 1993: undrafted

Career history
- Cincinnati Bengals (1993)
- Stats at Pro Football Reference

Bradley James Smith (born September 5, 1969) is an American former professional football player who was a linebacker for the Cincinnati Bengals of the National Football League (NFL). He played college football for the TCU Horned Frogs.
