= Adrian Hardy =

American football player (born 1970)

No. 45, 41
- Position: Defensive back

Personal information
- Born: August 16, 1970 (age 56); New Orleans, Louisiana, U.S.
- Listed height: 5 ft 11 in (1.80 m)
- Listed weight: 194 lb (88 kg)

Career information
- High school: Redeemer (New Orleans)
- College: Northwestern State (1989–1992)
- NFL draft: 1993: 2nd round, 48th overall pick

Career history
- San Francisco 49ers (1993–1994); Cincinnati Bengals (1994–1995)

Awards and highlights
- 2× First-team All-SLC (1991–1992)

Career NFL statistics
- Tackles: 6
- Fumble recoveries: 1
- Stats at Pro Football Reference

Adrian Paul Hardy (born August 16, 1970) is an American former professional football player who was a defensive back for three seasons in the National Football League (NFL) with the San Francisco 49ers and Cincinnati Bengals. He was selected by the 49ers in the second round of the 1993 NFL draft after playing college football for the Northwestern State Demons.

== Early life ==
Adrian Paul Hardy was born on August 16, 1970, in New Orleans, Louisiana. He attended Redeemer High School in New Orleans.

== College career ==
Hardy was a four-year letterman for the Northwestern State Demons of Northwestern State University from 1989 to 1992. He earned first-team All-Southland Conference honors in 1991 and 1992 while also being named an All-American in 1992. He blocked ten kicks during his college career. Hardy played in the Hula Bowl after his senior season. He was inducted into the school's N-Club Hall of Fame in 2014.

== Professional career ==
Hardy was selected by the San Francisco 49ers in the second round, with the 48th overall pick, of the 1993 NFL draft. He officially signed with the team on July 12. He played in ten games for the 49ers during his rookie year in 1993. He appeared in two games in 1994 before being waived on September 15, 1994.

Hardy was claimed off waivers by the Cincinnati Bengals on September 16, 1994. He played in 14 games for the Bengals during the 1994 season, returning eight kicks for 185 yards and recovering one fumble. He was waived on August 27, 1995. He was re-signed by the Bengals on September 25 and appeared in ten games for them during the 1995 season. Hardy was released on March 22, 1996.
