= 1993 Indianapolis Colts season =

41st season in franchise history

- Owner: Robert Irsay
- Head coach: Ted Marchibroda
- Offensive coordinator: Nick Nicolau
- Defensive coordinator: Rick Venturi
- Home stadium: Hoosier Dome

Results
- Record: 4–12
- Division place: 5th AFC East
- Playoffs: Did not qualify

The 1993 Indianapolis Colts season was the 41st season for the team in the National Football League and tenth in Indianapolis. The Indianapolis Colts finished the National Football League's 1993 season with a record of 4 wins and 12 losses, and finished fifth in the AFC East division. The Colts would get off to a fast 2–1 start. However, after that, the Colts would go into a tailspin for the rest of the season, losing 11 of their final 13 games. The Colts offense was abysmal during the season, scoring only 189 points all season, the fewest in the league, and 3 of their 4 wins were by a 9 to 6 tally. Their only other win was a 23–10 win over the Cleveland Browns in week 4. For the first and only time in league history, all NFL teams played their 16-game schedule over a span of 18 weeks.

== Offseason ==
=== NFL draft ===
Round	Pick	Player	Position	School/Club team
1	16	Sean Dawkins	Wide Receiver	California
2	49	Roosevelt Potts	Fullback	Northeast Louisiana
3	65	Ray Buchanan	Cornerback	Louisville
4	92	Derwin Gray	Safety	BYU
4	107	Devon McDonald	Linebacker	Notre Dame
6	157	Carlos Etheredge	Tight End	Miami(FL)
7	184	Lance Lewis	Running Back	Nebraska
8	211	Marquise Thomas	Linebacker	Ole Miss

== Personnel ==
=== Staff ===
1993 Indianapolis Colts staff
Front office: President/treasurer – Robert Irsay; Vice president/general manager – Jim Irsay; Assistant general manager – Bob Terpening; Director of player personnel – Jack Bushofsky; Director of pro personnel – Clyde Powers; Head coaches: Head coach – Ted Marchibroda; Offensive coaches: Offensive coordinator – Nick Nicolau; Running backs – Gene Huey; Receivers – Dwain Painter; Tight ends – Brad Seely; Offensive line – Ron Blackledge; Offensive assistant – Fred Bruney	Defensive coaches: Defensive coordinator/linebackers – Rick Venturi; Defensive line – Francis Peay; Secondary – George Catavolos; Defensive assistant – Jay Robertson; Special teams coaches: Special teams – Brad Seely; Strength and conditioning: Strength and conditioning – Tom Zupancic

=== Roster ===
1993 Indianapolis Colts roster
Quarterbacks (QB): 11 Jeff George; 7 Don Majkowski; 10 Jack Trudeau; Running backs (RB): 35 Rodney Culver; 23 Anthony Johnson FB; 42 Roosevelt Potts; 28 Ed Toner; 44 Warren Williams; Wide receivers (WR): -- Shannon Baker; 80 Aaron Cox; 87 Sean Dawkins; 84 Jessie Hester; 85 Reggie Langhorne; 83 Clarence Verdin; Tight ends (TE): 81 Charles Arbuckle; 49 Jason Burleson; 88 Kerry Cash	Offensive linemen (OL): 71 Kevin Call T; 69 Randy Dixon G; 63 Kirk Lowdermilk C; 64 Trevor Matich; 73 Zefross Moss T; 68 John Ray T; 74 Bill Schultz G; 79 Joe Staysniak G; 62 Kipp Vickers G; Defensive linemen (DL): 99 Michael Brandon DE; 76 Sam Clancy DT; 78 Jon Hand DE; 95 Skip McClendon DE; 61 Tony McCoy DT; 96 Willis Peguese DE/DT; 92 Tom Sims DT; 98 Tony Siragusa DT	Linebackers (LB): 50 Duane Bickett OLB; 53 Paul Butcher MLB; 55 Quentin Coryatt MLB; 59 Steve Grant LB; 54 Jeff Herrod OLB; 57 Devon McDonald OLB; 97 Scott Radecic OLB; 94 Marquise Thomas OLB; Defensive backs (DB): 33 Ashley Ambrose CB; 36 John Baylor SS; 29 Jason Belser S; 34 Ray Buchanan FS; 38 Eugene Daniel CB; 30 Derwin Gray SS; 37 Chris Goode CB; 32 Robert O'Neal CB; 45 Tony Stargell CB; Special teams (ST): 4 Dean Biasucci K; 3 Rohn Stark P	Practice squad: 86 Brian Stablein WR; 58 Donald Jones LB; Reserve: 51 Chip Banks LB (IR); 90 Steve Emtman DE (IR); 48 Carlos Etheredge TE (IR); 75 Cecil Gray G (IR); 56 Michael Heldt C (IR); 25 Ronald Humphrey RB (IR); 52 Brian Ratigan LB (IR); 66 Ron Solt G (IR); 72 Mark Vander Poel T (PUP); 67 Will Wolford T (IR); Rookies in italics 53 active, 10 reserve, 2 practice squad

== Regular season ==
=== Schedule ===
Week	Date	Opponent	Result	Record	Venue	Attendance
1	September 5	**Miami Dolphins**	**L** 20–24	0–1	Hoosier Dome	51,858
2	September 12	at Cincinnati Bengals	**W** 9–6	1–1	Riverfront Stadium	50,299
3	Bye					
4	September 26	Cleveland Browns	**W** 23–10	2–1	Hoosier Dome	59,654
5	October 3	at Denver Broncos	**L** 13–35	2–2	Mile High Stadium	74,953
6	October 10	Dallas Cowboys	**L** 3–27	2–3	Hoosier Dome	60,453
7	Bye					
8	October 24	at **Miami Dolphins**	**L** 27–41	2–4	Joe Robbie Stadium	57,301
9	October 31	**New England Patriots**	**W** 9–6	3–4	Hoosier Dome	46,522
10	November 7	at Washington Redskins	**L** 24–30	3–5	RFK Stadium	50,523
11	November 14	**New York Jets**	**L** 17–31	3–6	Hoosier Dome	47,351
12	November 21	at **Buffalo Bills**	**L** 9–23	3–7	Rich Stadium	79,101
13	November 29	San Diego Chargers	**L** 0–31	3–8	Hoosier Dome	54,110
14	December 5	at **New York Jets**	**W** 9–6	4–8	Giants Stadium	45,799
15	December 12	at New York Giants	**L** 6–20	4–9	Giants Stadium	70,411
16	December 19	Philadelphia Eagles	**L** 10–20	4–10	Hoosier Dome	44,952
17	December 26	at **New England Patriots**	**L** 0–38	4–11	Foxboro Stadium	26,571
18	January 2, 1994	**Buffalo Bills**	**L** 10–30	4–12	Hoosier Dome	43,028
Note: Intra-division opponents are in **bold** text.

=== Standings ===
AFC East
	W	L	T	PCT	PF	PA	STK
^{(1)} Buffalo Bills	12	4	0	.750	329	242	W4
Miami Dolphins	9	7	0	.563	349	351	L5
New York Jets	8	8	0	.500	270	247	L3
New England Patriots	5	11	0	.313	238	286	W4
Indianapolis Colts	4	12	0	.250	189	378	L4

== See also ==
- History of the Indianapolis Colts
- Indianapolis Colts seasons
- Colts–Patriots rivalry
