= Donnell Johnson =

American football player (born 1969)

No. 68
- Position: Defensive end

Personal information
- Born: December 24, 1969 (age 56); Miami, Florida, U.S.
- Listed height: 6 ft 7 in (2.01 m)
- Listed weight: 310 lb (141 kg)

Career information
- High school: Miami Northwestern
- College: Johnson C. Smith
- NFL draft: 1993: undrafted

Career history
- Cincinnati Bengals (1993); Shreveport Pirates (1994–1995)
- Stats at Pro Football Reference

Donnell Z. Johnson (born December 24, 1969) is an American former professional football player who was a defensive end for the Cincinnati Bengals of the National Football League (NFL). He played college football for the Johnson C. Smith Golden Bulls.
