= Forey Duckett =

American football player (born 1970)

No. 41, 21, 23, 42, 25
- Position: Cornerback

Personal information
- Born: February 5, 1970 (age 56); Oakland, California, U.S.
- Listed height: 6 ft 3 in (1.91 m)
- Listed weight: 195 lb (88 kg)

Career information
- High school: Pinole Valley (Pinole, California)
- College: Nevada
- NFL draft: 1993: 5th round, 117th overall pick

Career history
- Cincinnati Bengals (1993–1994); Green Bay Packers (1994); Seattle Seahawks (1994); San Francisco 49ers (1995)*; Scottish Claymores (1996); Winnipeg Blue Bombers (1996); New Orleans Saints (1996–1997)*
- * Offseason or practice squad member only

Career NFL statistics
- Games played: 7
- Stats at Pro Football Reference

William Forey Duckett (born February 5, 1970) is an American former professional football player who was a cornerback in the National Football League (NFL). He played college football for the Nevada Wolf Pack.

== Biography ==
Duckett was born in Oakland, California.

== Professional career ==
Duckett was selected by the Cincinnati Bengals in the fifth round of the 1993 NFL draft. In his first season with them he did not see any playing time during the regular season. He spent the 1994 NFL season with the Bengals, the Green Bay Packers, and the Seattle Seahawks.

He played at the collegiate level at the University of Nevada, Reno.
