= Del Speer =

American football player (born 1970)

No. 43, 28
- Position: Defensive back

Personal information
- Born: February 1, 1970 (age 56); Miami, Florida, U.S.
- Listed height: 6 ft 0 in (1.83 m)
- Listed weight: 196 lb (89 kg)

Career information
- High school: Carol City (Miami Gardens, Florida)
- College: Florida (1989–1992)
- NFL draft: 1993: undrafted

Career history
- Cleveland Browns (1993–1994); Seattle Seahawks (1994)

Career NFL statistics
- Games played: 25
- Stats at Pro Football Reference

Delfonico Arnese Speer (born February 1, 1970) is an American former professional football player who was a defensive back for the Cleveland Browns and Seattle Seahawks of the National Football League (NFL). He played college football for the Florida Gators.
