= Patrick Robinson (wide receiver) =

American football player (born 1969)

No. 81, 82
- Position: Wide receiver

Personal information
- Born: October 3, 1969 (age 57); Memphis, Tennessee, U.S.
- Listed height: 5 ft 8 in (1.73 m)
- Listed weight: 176 lb (80 kg)

Career information
- High school: Northside (TN)
- College: Tennessee State
- NFL draft: 1993: 7th round, 187th overall pick

Career history
- Houston Oilers (1993)*; Cincinnati Bengals (1993); Arizona Cardinals (1994)
- * Offseason or practice squad member only

Career NFL statistics
- Receptions: 9
- Yards: 77
- Return yards: 1,388
- Stats at Pro Football Reference

Patrick Lavel Robinson (born October 3, 1969) was an American football player who played college football at Tennessee State and in the National Football League (NFL) for the Cincinnati Bengals and Arizona Cardinals. He was selected by the Houston Oilers in the seventh round of the 1993 NFL draft with the 187th overall pick.
