= Ryan Benjamin (running back) =

American football player (born 1970)

No. 21, 2
- Position: Running back

Personal information
- Born: April 23, 1970 (age 56); Santa Clara County, California, U.S.
- Listed height: 5 ft 7 in (1.70 m)
- Listed weight: 183 lb (83 kg)

Career information
- High school: Tulare Union (Tulare, California)
- College: Pacific
- NFL draft: 1993: undrafted

Career history
- Cincinnati Bengals (1993); Shreveport Pirates (1994); Memphis Pharaohs/Portland Forest Dragons (1995–1999)

Awards and highlights
- First-team All-American (1991); Second-team All-American (1992)

Career AFL statistics
- Receptions: 164
- Receiving yards: 1,876
- Receiving touchdowns: 27
- Rushing touchdowns: 10
- Return touchdowns: 10
- Stats at ArenaFan.com
- Stats at Pro Football Reference

Ryan Lamont Benjamin (born April 23, 1970) is an American former professional football player who was a running back for one season with the Cincinnati Bengals of the National Football League (NFL). He played college football for the Pacific Tigers, earning first-team All-American honors in 1991. He was also a member of the Shreveport Pirates of the Canadian Football League (CFL) and the Memphis Pharaohs/Portland Forest Dragons of the Arena Football League (AFL).

== Early life ==
Ryan Lamont Benjamin was born on April 23, 1970, in Santa Clara County, California. He attended Tulare Union High School in Tulare, California.

== College career ==
Benjamin first played college football for the College of the Sequoias Giants.

He played for the Pacific Tigers of the University of the Pacific from 1990 to 1992. He earned Big West Conference Offensive Player of the Year honors in 1991 and 1992. Benjamin led NCAA Division I-A in all-purpose yardage and became the first player in conference history to record 50 passes while rushing for at least 1,500 yards. His 2,996 all-purpose yards were second only to Barry Sanders' NCAA record in 1988. He was named Pacific's first Associated Press first-team All-American and was also the second player in Big West Conference history to earn the honor. Benjamin garnered AP and UPI All-America second-team recognition after rushing for 1,441 yards and compiling 2,597 all-purpose yards his senior year in 1992. He was inducted into the Pacific Athletics Hall of Fame as part of the 2004-05 class.

== Professional career ==
Benjamin was signed by the Cincinnati Bengals on April 28, 1993, after going undrafted in the 1993 NFL draft. He played in one game for the Bengals during the 1993 season. He was released by the Bengals on August 10, 1994.

Benjamin signed with the Shreveport Pirates in August 1994 and played for the team during the 1994 season.

Benjamin was a member of the Memphis Pharaohs/Portland Forest Dragons from 1995 to 1999. He was named team captain and earned team MVP honors. He left the team after the 1998 season.
