= Lamont Hollinquest =

American football player (born 1970)

No. 96, 56
- Position: Linebacker

Personal information
- Born: October 24, 1970 (age 56); Los Angeles, California, U.S.
- Listed height: 6 ft 3 in (1.91 m)
- Listed weight: 250 lb (113 kg)

Career information
- High school: Pius X (Downey, California)
- College: USC
- NFL draft: 1993: 8th round, 212th overall pick

Career history
- Washington Redskins (1993–1994); Cincinnati Bengals (1994); Green Bay Packers (1996–1998); Kansas City Chiefs (1999)*
- * Offseason or practice squad member only

Awards and highlights
- Super Bowl champion (XXXI)

Career NFL statistics
- Tackles: 47
- Sacks: 0.5
- Interceptions: 2
- Stats at Pro Football Reference

Lamont Bertrell Hollinquest (born October 24, 1970) is an American former professional football player who was a linebacker in the National Football League (NFL) for the Washington Redskins and the Green Bay Packers. He played college football for the USC Trojans.

== Early life ==
Hollinquest attended Pius X High School in Downey, California. After spending a year at a junior college to get his academics up, he played college football at the University of Southern California. Hollinquest started his career as a safety but then moved to linebacker after an influx of recruits and transfers as a senior. It is widely believed Hollinquest introduced USC QB Todd Marinovich to social drugs while they were roommates at USC.

== Professional career ==
=== Washington Redskins ===
Hollinquest was selected by the Washington Redskins in the eighth round (212th pick overall) of the 1993 NFL draft. In his two years with Washington, Hollinquest recorded 22 tackles and an interception. The Redskins waived him near the end of the 1994 season.

=== Cincinnati Bengals ===
Hollinquest was picked up by the Cincinnati Bengals in time for their December 21, 1994, game, but was inactive and was later cut before the 1995 season started.

=== Green Bay Packers ===
Following a tryout, Hollinquest played for the Green Bay Packers starting in the 1996 season. He immediately made an impact on special teams, finishing the year with 15 tackles. He was part of the Packers' Super Bowl XXXI championship team. Hollinquest continued to get more playing time throughout his career in Green Bay, with his tackles increasing each year. The Packers did not re-sign Hollinquest after the 1998 season. After he was cut by the Chiefs, the Packers signed Hollinquest in August 1999 due to a lack of depth at linebacker and the retirement of Robert Brooks. After the NFL suspended Hollinquest for the first four games of the season due to substance abuse problems, the Packers cut Hollinquest on August 30, 1999.

=== Kansas City Chiefs ===
The Kansas City Chiefs signed Hollinquest in March 1999. He was waived before training camp began.

== Post-career life ==
On February 8, 2013, Hollinquest was arrested in Maricopa County, Arizona for narcotic drug possession and use, possession and use of drug paraphernalia and driving with a suspended/revoked license. He has three kids, Chaz, Courtney and Kohl.
