= Lance Gunn =

American football player (born 1970)

No. 27
- Position: Defensive back

Personal information
- Born: January 9, 1970 (age 56); Whiteman Air Force Base, Missouri, U.S.
- Listed height: 6 ft 3 in (1.91 m)
- Listed weight: 222 lb (101 kg)

Career information
- High school: North Shore (Houston, Texas)
- College: Texas
- NFL draft: 1993: 7th round, 175th overall pick

Career history
- Cincinnati Bengals (1993–1994); New Orleans Saints (1995)*; Frankfurt Galaxy (1996)
- * Offseason or practice squad member only

Awards and highlights
- First-team All-American (1992); 2× First-team All-SWC (1990, 1992)

Career NFL statistics
- Fumble recoveries: 1
- Stats at Pro Football Reference

Lance Cameron Gunn (born January 9, 1970) is an American former professional football player who was a defensive back in the National Football League (NFL) and NFL Europe. He played college football for the Texas Longhorns.

== Early life ==
Gunn grew up in an east suburb of Houston, Texas. He attended North Shore High School in Cloverleaf, Texas, and played high school football there.

== College career ==
Gunn played college football at the University of Texas at Austin in Austin, Texas. He red-shirted his freshman year in 1988, then played three seasons for head coach David McWilliams (1989–91), and his senior season (1992) for head coach John Mackovic. His sophomore season in 1990, Texas won the Southwest Conference and finished the regular season ranked No. 3. Gunn was a three-time All-SWC selection (1989–91) and named an All-American safety in 1992.

College stats include 298 tackles (188 solo) and six QB sacks. He led the Longhorns in interceptions with five in 1991 and tied for the lead in blocked kicks in 1992. He graduated from UT in 1993 with a marketing degree.

In 2011, Gunn was inducted into the Longhorn Hall of Honor.

== Professional career ==
Gunn was selected by Cincinnati Bengals with the seventh pick of the seventh round of the 1993 NFL draft. He played one season for the Bengals, starting eight games before being placed on the injured reserve list. He was then released by the Bengals at the end of camp in 1994.

In 1995 he was signed by the New Orleans Saints in the offseason, but then cut at the end of camp.

In 1996, Gunn played for the Frankfurt Galaxy in the NFL Europe league. The team went to World Bowl '96 which he came into as a substitution; but even though he was the team's 5th leading tackler, he didn't record any stats in the game. His football career ended the following spring of 1997 after donating a kidney to his ailing father.

In 1999 he signed to play with the Texas Terminators of the Indoor Professional Football League but then opted to work for Frito Lay instead.
