= Tom Scott (offensive lineman) =

American football player (born 1970)

No. 74
- Position: Tackle / Guard

Personal information
- Born: June 25, 1970; Burke County, North Carolina, U.S.
- Died: October 8, 2015 (aged 45); Greensboro, North Carolina, U.S.
- Listed height: 6 ft 6 in (1.98 m)
- Listed weight: 330 lb (150 kg)

Career information
- High school: Union (Clinton, North Carolina)
- College: East Carolina (1989–1992)
- NFL draft: 1993: 6th round, 148th overall pick

Career history
- Cincinnati Bengals (1993)

Career NFL statistics
- Games played: 13
- Games started: 13
- Fumble recoveries: 2
- Stats at Pro Football Reference

Thomas Lee Frederick Scott (June 25, 1970 – October 8, 2015) was an American former professional football offensive lineman who played one season with the Cincinnati Bengals of the National Football League (NFL). He was selected by the Bengals in the sixth round of the 1993 NFL draft after playing college football at East Carolina University.

== Early life ==
Thomas Lee Frederick Scott was born on June 25, 1970, in Burke County, North Carolina. He weighed 280 pounds in eighth grade. He attended Union High School in Clinton, North Carolina, and graduated in 1988.

== College career ==
Scott was a four-year letterman for the East Carolina Pirates of East Carolina University (ECU) from 1989 to 1992. He played in 42 games, starting 33, during his college career and earned first-team All-South Independent honors twice. He was an Associated Press honorable mention All-American his junior year in 1991. As a senior in 1992, Scott was named a first-team All-American by both the Football News and The Sporting News. He weighed about 332 pounds as a junior and 374 pounds as a senior. He played in the East-West Shrine Game and the Senior Bowl after his senior year. In 2013, he garnered first-team recognition on ECU's All-Time Offensive Team.

== Professional career ==
Scott was selected by the Cincinnati Bengals in the sixth round, with the 148th overall pick, of the 1993 NFL draft. He officially signed with the team on July 19. He weighed about 360 pounds in mid July 1993 but got down to 330 pounds for the regular season. He played in 13 games, all starts, for the Bengals during his rookie year in 1993 and recovered two fumbles. Cincinnati finished the season with a 3–13 record. Scott's weight ballooned to 409 pounds after the 1993 season. The Bengals sent Scott to Orlando, Florida to work out with trainer Mike Spotts. However, Scott only managed to get his weight down to 381 pounds. As a result, he was released on July 15, 1994.

== Personal life ==
Scott was the offensive line coach at James Kenan High School in Warsaw, North Carolina for 12 years. He died on October 8, 2015, at Moses Cone Hospital in Greensboro, North Carolina.
