= Fernandus Vinson =

American football player (born 1968)

No. 34
- Position: Safety

Personal information
- Born: November 3, 1968 (age 58); Montgomery, Alabama, U.S.
- Listed height: 5 ft 10 in (1.78 m)
- Listed weight: 197 lb (89 kg)

Career information
- High school: Carver (Montgomery)
- College: NC State (1987–1990)
- NFL draft: 1991: 7th round, 184th overall pick

Career history
- Cincinnati Bengals (1991–1994)

Awards and highlights
- 2× Second-team All-ACC (1989, 1990)

Career NFL statistics
- Tackles: 93
- Fumble recoveries: 4
- Touchdowns: 1
- Stats at Pro Football Reference

Fernandus Lamar Vinson (born November 3, 1968) is an American former professional football player who was a safety for four seasons with the Cincinnati Bengals of the National Football League (NFL). He was selected by the Bengals in the seventh round of the 1991 NFL draft after playing college football for the NC State Wolfpack.

== Early life and college ==
Fernandus Lamar Vinson was born on November 3, 1968, in Montgomery, Alabama. He attended George Washington Carver High School in Montgomery.

He was a four-year letterman for the Wolfpack at North Carolina State University from 1987 to 1990. He was named second-team All-ACC by the Associated Press in both 1989 and 1990.

== Professional career ==
Vinson was selected by the Cincinnati Bengals in the seventh round, with the 184th overall pick, of the 1991 NFL draft. He officially signed with the team on July 18. He was waived on August 26 and signed to the team's practice squad two days later. He was promoted to the active roster on September 21 and played in 13 games for the Bengals during the 1991 season, recording six tackles. Vinson became a free agent after the season and re-signed with the Bengals. He appeared in 13 games, starting four, in 1992, totaling 21 tackles, one sack, and a 22-yard fumble return touchdown, before being placed on injured reserve on December 9, 1992. He was released on August 30, 1993, but re-signed on September 1, 1993. Vinson played in all 16 games, starting seven, for the Bengals in 1993, accumulating 32 tackles, two forced fumbles, and three fumble recoveries. He became a free agent again after the 1993 season and re-signed with the team on May 2, 1994. He appeared in all 16 games for the second consecutive season, starting four, in 1994, recording 29 solo tackles, five assisted tackles, and one forced fumble. He became a free agent after the season.

== Personal life ==
Vinson graduated from Methodist University with a bachelor's in social work and from Liberty University with a master's in professional counseling. He has spent time working as a counselor.
