= Dan Jones (American football) =

American football player (born 1970)

No. 66
- Position: Offensive tackle

Personal information
- Born: July 22, 1970 (age 56); Malden, Massachusetts, U.S.
- Listed height: 6 ft 7 in (2.01 m)
- Listed weight: 298 lb (135 kg)

Career information
- High school: Malden
- College: Maine
- NFL draft: 1993: undrafted

Career history
- Cincinnati Bengals (1993–1995)

Career NFL statistics
- Games played: 34
- Games started: 5
- Stats at Pro Football Reference

Daniel T. Jones (born July 22, 1970) is an American former professional football player who was an offensive tackle for the Cincinnati Bengals of the National Football League (NFL). He played college football for the Maine Black Bears.
