= Jim McNally =

American football coach (born 1943)

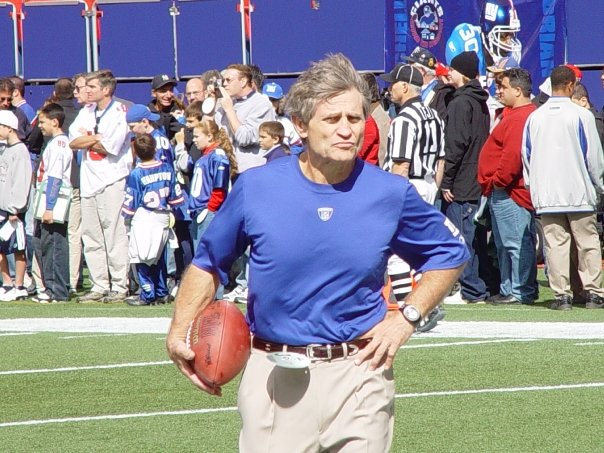
- McNally with New York Giants in 2003

Personal information
- Born: December 13, 1943 (age 82); Buffalo, New York, U.S.

Career information
- College: Buffalo

Career history
- Buffalo (1966–1970) Assistant; Marshall (1971–1974) Assistant; Boston College (1975–1977) Assistant; Wake Forest (1978–1979) Assistant; Cincinnati Bengals (1980–1994) Offensive line coach; Carolina Panthers (1995–1998) Offensive line coach; New York Giants (1999–2003) Offensive line coach; Buffalo Bills (2004–2007) Offensive line coach; New York Jets (2010–2011) Consultant; Cincinnati Bengals (2012–202?) Consultant

Jim McNally (born December 13, 1943) is an American former football coach, whose 28-year professional coaching career in the National Football League (NFL) included tenures with the Cincinnati Bengals, Carolina Panthers and New York Giants before retiring following a four-year stint with the Buffalo Bills.

McNally began his coaching career for the University at Buffalo in 1965 and also coached at Marshall University, Boston College and Wake Forest. McNally won himself a place in the U.B. Athletic Hall of Fame in 1982 in recognition of both his Bulls playing career (1961–1964) and also his coaching expertise. He was inducted into the Greater Buffalo Sports Hall of Fame in 2008.

Since his retirement, McNally puts on offensive and defensive line teaching camps and clinics and serves as a volunteer fundraiser with the University at Buffalo.

In the film We Are Marshall, which tells the true story of a football team that was reconstructed after a tragic plane accident, the character of McNally is played by Ron Clinton Smith.
