= Ty Parten =

American football player (born 1969)

No. 93, 95, 91, 97
- Position: Defensive lineman

Personal information
- Born: October 13, 1969 (age 57); Washington, D.C., U.S.
- Listed height: 6 ft 5 in (1.96 m)
- Listed weight: 278 lb (126 kg)

Career information
- High school: Horizon (Scottsdale, Arizona)
- College: Arizona
- NFL draft: 1993: 3rd round, 63rd overall pick

Career history
- Cincinnati Bengals (1993–1995); Scottish Claymores (1996); St. Louis Rams (1997)*; Kansas City Chiefs (1997–2000); Las Vegas Outlaws (2001)
- * Offseason or practice squad member only

Career NFL statistics
- Tackles: 55
- Fumble recoveries: 1
- Passes defended: 1
- Stats at Pro Football Reference

Ty Daniel Parten (born October 13, 1969) is an American former professional football player who was a defensive lineman in the National Football League (NFL). After playing college football for the Arizona Wildcats, Parten was selected by the Cincinnati Bengals in the third round (63rd overall) of the 1993 NFL draft. He played seven seasons for the Bengals from 1993 to 1995 and Kansas City Chiefs from 1997 to 2000.
