= Mike Brim =

American football player (1966–2005)

Michael Brim
No. 44, 42, 43
- Position: Cornerback

Personal information
- Born: January 23, 1966; Danville, Virginia, U.S.
- Died: April 19, 2005 (aged 39); Richmond, Virginia, U.S.
- Listed height: 6 ft 0 in (1.83 m)
- Listed weight: 192 lb (87 kg)

Career information
- High school: George Washington (Danville)
- College: Virginia Union
- NFL draft: 1988: 4th round, 95th overall pick

Career history
- Phoenix Cardinals (1988); Detroit Lions (1989); Minnesota Vikings (1989–1990); New York Jets (1991–1992); Cincinnati Bengals (1993–1995)

Career NFL statistics
- Tackles: 269
- Interceptions: 17
- Touchdowns: 2
- Stats at Pro Football Reference

Michael Brim (January 23, 1966 – April 19, 2005) was an American professional football cornerback who played eight seasons in the National Football League (NFL). Brim attended Virginia Union University, a historically black college that was Division II. He was selected by the Phoenix Cardinals in the fourth round of the 1988 NFL draft.

== Death ==
Brim was killed on April 19, 2005, in Richmond, Virginia in a shootout with another man following an argument about a woman.
