= Scott Brumfield =

American football player and coach (born 1970)

No. 72
- Position: Guard

Personal information
- Born: August 19, 1970 (age 56); Salt Lake City, Utah, U.S.
- Listed height: 6 ft 8 in (2.03 m)
- Listed weight: 321 lb (146 kg)

Career information
- High school: Spanish Fork (Spanish Fork, Utah)
- College: BYU
- NFL draft: 1993: undrafted

Career history

Playing
- Cincinnati Bengals (1993–1998)

Coaching
- Spanish Fork HS (UT) (2000–2005) Head coach; Dixie State (2006–2009) Offensive coordinator; Dixie State (2010–2015) Head coach

Career NFL statistics
- Games played: 56
- Games started: 29
- Stats at Pro Football Reference

Scott Wheeler Brumfield (born August 19, 1970) is an American former football player and coach. He played professionally as an offensive guard for the Cincinnati Bengals of the National Football League. He played college football for the BYU Cougars

Brumfield was not drafted, but was later signed by the Bengals as a free-agent in 1996. He played six seasons in the NFL. Brumfield suffered a severe spinal-cord injury that left his legs temporarily paralyzed in the third quarter of a game in Baltimore. After requiring the use of crutches to walk for several months, he rehabilitated and returned to play for the Bengals. In 2006, Brumfield joined the coaching staff at Dixie State University and became head football coach of the Red Storm in 2010. On November 9, 2015, Brumfield resigned as Dixie State head coach.

== Head coaching record ==
=== College ===
Year	Team	Overall	Conference	Standing	Bowl/playoffs
Dixie State Red Storm (Great Northwest Athletic Conference) (2010–2015)
2010	Dixie State	2–8	2–6	4th	
2011	Dixie State	1–10	1–7	5th	
2012	Dixie State	3–8	3–7	6th	
2013	Dixie State	4–7	4–6	4th	
2014	Dixie State	1–10	0–6	7th	
2015	Dixie State	3–7	2–4	T–5th	
Dixie State:		14–50	12–36		
Total:		14–50			
