= 1996 Jacksonville Jaguars season =

2nd season in franchise history; first playoff appearance

- Head coach: Tom Coughlin
- Offensive coordinator: Kevin Gilbride
- Defensive coordinator: Dick Jauron
- Home stadium: Jacksonville Municipal Stadium

Results
- Record: 9–7
- Division place: 2nd AFC Central
- Playoffs: Won Wild Card Playoffs (at Bills) 30–27; Won Divisional Playoffs (at Broncos) 30–27; Lost AFC Championship (at Patriots) 6–20
- Pro Bowlers: T Tony Boselli; QB Mark Brunell; WR Keenan McCardell

Uniform

The 1996 season was the Jacksonville Jaguars' 2nd season in the National Football League (NFL) and their second season under the leadership of general manager and head coach Tom Coughlin. The Jaguars improved on their 4–12 record from their inaugural season. The Jaguars marked success as they won six of their last seven games of the season and finished with a record of 9–7. The credit for this midseason turnaround probably lies in the demotion of wide receiver Andre Rison in favor of Jimmy Smith after a game against the St. Louis Rams in which Brunell threw five interceptions, which were blamed on Rison and resulted in his benching. In the team's final game of the regular season against the Atlanta Falcons, needing a win to earn a playoff berth, the Jaguars caught a bit of luck when Morten Andersen missed a 30-yard field goal with less than a minute remaining that would have given the Falcons the lead. The Jaguars clinched the fifth seed in the AFC playoffs.

The Jaguars achieved their first ever franchise playoff game victory, in a stunning upset on the road against the Buffalo Bills. The victory against the Bills was notable because the Bills roster was made up of many of the same players that had been to four Super Bowls in the decade, including eventual Hall of Fame players Jim Kelly, Thurman Thomas, Andre Reed, and Bruce Smith (who had previously been the league Defensive Player of the Year). Their next game was on the road against the Denver Broncos, who had dominated the AFC with a 13–3 record (and earned the top AFC seed). The upstart Jaguars were not intimidated by the Broncos or their fans and their good fortune continued. They largely dominated from the second quarter onward. A late touchdown pass from Mark Brunell to Jimmy Smith gave the Jags a 30–20 lead. They held on to win in a huge upset, 30–27, in a game that many people still consider the franchise's finest hour. Upon their return home, the Jags were greeted by an estimated 40,000 fans at the stadium. Many of these fans had watched the game on the stadium JumboTron displays and had stayed into the early hours of the morning when the team arrived. In the AFC Championship Game, the Jaguars acquitted themselves very well, playing a tight and close defensive game in a hostile environment for over three quarters before finally losing 20–6 to the New England Patriots on the road.

== Offseason ==
Additions	Subtractions
DT John Jurkovic (Packers)	WR Desmond Howard (Packers)
LB Eddie Robinson (Oilers)	QB Steve Beuerlein (Panthers)
RB Natrone Means (Chargers)	LB Keith Goganious (Ravens)
WR Keenan McCardell (Browns)	T Bruce Wilkerson (Packers)
DE Clyde Simmons (Cardinals)	S Darren Carrington (Raiders)

=== NFL draft ===
1996 Jacksonville Jaguars draft
Round	Pick	Player	Position	College	Notes
1	2	Kevin Hardy *	Linebacker	Illinois	
2	33	Tony Brackens *	Defensive end	Texas	
2	60	Michael Cheever	Center	Georgia Tech	
3	63	Aaron Beasley	Cornerback	West Virginia	
4	110	Reggie Barlow	Wide receiver	Alabama State	
5	146	Jimmy Herndon	Guard	Houston	
6	170	John Fisher	Defensive back	Missouri Western State	
6	185	Chris Doering	Wide receiver	Florida	
7	227	Clarence Jones	Wide receiver	Tennessee State	
7	228	Gregory Spann	Wide receiver	Jackson State	
Made roster * Made at least one Pro Bowl during career

=== Undrafted free agents ===
1996 Undrafted free agents of note
Player	Position	College
Omari Mangrum	Tackle	Indiana State
Chris Parker	Running back	Marshall
Steve Taneyhill	Quarterback	South Carolina
Patrick Walsh	Tackle	UConn

== Staff ==
1996 Jacksonville Jaguars staff
Front office: Chairman/chief executive officer – Wayne Weaver; President/chief operating officer – David Seldin; Senior vice president of football operations – Michael Huyghue; Director of college scouting – Rick Reiprish; Director of pro personnel – Ron Hill; Assistant director of pro personnel – Fran Foley; College scout – Rick Mueller; College scout – Gene Smith; College scout – Doug Williams; Head coaches: Head coach – Tom Coughlin; Offensive coaches: Offensive coordinator – Kevin Gilbride; Running backs – Jerald Ingram; Wide receivers – Pete Carmichael; Tight ends – Nick Nicolau; Offensive line – Mike Maser	Defensive coaches: Defensive coordinator – Dick Jauron; Defensive line – John Pease; Linebackers – Steve Szabo; Outside linebackers – Lucious Selmon; Defensive backs/secondary – Randy Edsall; Special teams coaches: Special teams coordinator – Larry Pasquale; Assistant special teams – Joe Baker; Strength and conditioning: Strength and conditioning – Jerry Palmieri; Assistant strength and conditioning – Jeff Hurd

== Final roster ==
1996 Jacksonville Jaguars roster
Quarterbacks (QB): 8 Mark Brunell; 11 Rob Johnson; 5 Todd Philcox; Running backs (RB): 23 Randy Jordan KR; 35 Le'Shai Maston FB; 20 Natrone Means; 33 James Stewart; Wide receivers (WR): 84 Reggie Barlow; 88 Kendricke Bullard; 80 Willie Jackson; 89 Curtis Marsh; 87 Keenan McCardell; 82 Jimmy Smith; Tight ends (TE): 86 Derek Brown; 81 Chris Griffin; 85 Rich Griffith LS; 49 Ty Hallock; 83 Pete Mitchell	Offensive linemen (OL): 71 Tony Boselli T; 63 Michael Cheever C; 62 Ben Coleman G; 73 Brian DeMarco G; 74 Jimmy Herndon T; 66 Greg Huntington G/C; 67 Jeff Novak G/T; 72 Leon Searcy T; 76 Rich Tylski G; 79 Dave Widell; Defensive linemen (DL): 90 Tony Brackens DE; 92 Don Davey DT; 91 Paul Frase DE/DT; 64 John Jurkovic DT; 56 Jeff Lageman DE; 93 Ernie Logan DE; 94 Kelvin Pritchett DT; 96 Clyde Simmons DE; 95 Jose White DT	Linebackers (LB): 52 Brant Boyer MLB; 51 Kevin Hardy OLB; 57 Jeff Kopp OLB; 55 Tom McManus MLB; 50 Eddie Robinson OLB; Defensive backs (DB): 21 Aaron Beasley CB; 42 Ricky Bell CB; 22 Bucky Brooks CB/KR; 45 Travis Davis SS; 28 Dana Hall SS; 37 Chris Hudson FS/PR; 40 Robert Massey CB; 30 Darren Studstill FS; 25 Mickey Washington CB; Special teams (ST): 4 Bryan Barker P; 1 Mike Hollis K	Practice squad: 78 Juan Hammonds DE; 68 Chris Oltmanns T; 39 Chris Parker RB; -- Moses Regular TE; -- Barry Stokes G/T; Reserve: 77 Andre Davis DT (IR); 53 Nate Dingle LB (IR); 29 John Fisher S (IR); 58 Bryan Schwartz LB (IR); 99 Joel Smeenge DE (IR); 41 Dave Thomas CB (IR); Rookies in italics 53 active, 6 reserve, 5 practice squad

== Preseason ==
Week	Date	Opponent	Result	Record	Stadium
1	August 2	New York Giants	L 17–24	0–1	Jacksonville Municipal Stadium
2	August 9	at St. Louis Rams	L 10–17	0–2	Trans World Dome
3	August 18	San Francisco 49ers	W 38–10	1–2	Jacksonville Municipal Stadium
4	August 23	at Denver Broncos	W 31–24	2–2	Mile High Stadium

== Regular season ==
=== Schedule ===
Week	Date	Opponent	Result	Record	Venue	Attendance
1	September 1	**Pittsburgh Steelers**	**W** 24–9	1–0	Jacksonville Municipal Stadium	70,210
2	September 8	**Houston Oilers**	**L** 27–34	1–1	Jacksonville Municipal Stadium	66,468
3	September 15	at Oakland Raiders	**L** 3–17	1–2	Oakland Coliseum	46,291
4	September 22	at New England Patriots	**L** 25–28 (OT)	1–3	Foxboro Stadium	59,446
5	September 29	Carolina Panthers	**W** 24–14	2–3	Jacksonville Municipal Stadium	71,537
6	October 6	at New Orleans Saints	**L** 13–17	2–4	Louisiana Superdome	34,231
7	October 13	New York Jets	**W** 21–17	3–4	Jacksonville Municipal Stadium	65,699
8	October 20	at St. Louis Rams	**L** 14–17	3–5	Trans World Dome	60,066
9	October 27	at **Cincinnati Bengals**	**L** 21–28	3–6	Cinergy Field	45,890
10	Bye					
11	November 10	**Baltimore Ravens**	**W** 30–27	4–6	Jacksonville Municipal Stadium	64,628
12	November 17	at **Pittsburgh Steelers**	**L** 3–28	4–7	Three Rivers Stadium	57,879
13	November 24	at **Baltimore Ravens**	**W** 28–25 (OT)	5–7	Memorial Stadium	57,384
14	December 1	**Cincinnati Bengals**	**W** 30–27	6–7	Jacksonville Municipal Stadium	57,408
15	December 8	at **Houston Oilers**	**W** 23–17	7–7	Houston Astrodome	20,196
16	December 15	Seattle Seahawks	**W** 20–13	8–7	Jacksonville Municipal Stadium	66,134
17	December 22	Atlanta Falcons	**W** 19–17	9–7	Jacksonville Municipal Stadium	71,449

Note: Intra-division opponents are in bold text.

=== Game summaries ===
==== Week 1: vs. Pittsburgh Steelers ====
Week One: Pittsburgh Steelers at Jacksonville Jaguars – Game summary

Quarter	1	2	3	4	Total
Steelers	3	3	3	0	**9**
**Jaguars**	7	7	3	10	**27**

at Jacksonville Municipal Stadium, Jacksonville, Florida

- Date: September 1, 1996
- Game time: 1:00 p.m. EDT
- Game weather: Cloudy, 82 °F (28 °C)
- Game attendance: 70,210
- Referee: Bob McElwee
- Recap, Game Book

Game information

**First quarter**

- JAX – Willie Jackson 38-yard pass from Mark Brunell (Mike Hollis kick), 8:26. Jaguars 7–0. **Drive: 8 plays, 80 yards, 4:32.**
- PIT – Norm Johnson 48-yard field goal, 0:52. Jaguars 7–3. **Drive: 8 plays, 32 yards, 3:58.**

**Second quarter**

- PIT – Norm Johnson 29-yard field goal, 3:12. Jaguars 7–3. **Drive: 11 plays, 52 yards, 4:46.**
- JAX – Keenan McCardell 15-yard pass from Mark Brunell (Mike Hollis kick), 0:16. Jaguars 14–6. **Drive: 8 plays, 60 yards, 2:56.**

**Third quarter**

- PIT – Norm Johnson 23-yard field goal, 1:19. Jaguars 14–9. **Drive: 10 plays, 37 yards, 5:10.**

**Fourth quarter**

- JAX – Mike Hollis 52-yard field goal, 8:25. Jaguars 17–9. **Drive: 11 plays, 46 yards, 5:40.**
- JAX – James Stewart 1-yard run (Mike Hollis kick), 4:49. Jaguars 24–9. **Drive: 7 plays, 40 yards, 3:19.**

Top passers

- PIT – Jim Miller – 9/17, 83 yards
- JAX – Mark Brunell – 20/31, 212 yards, 2 TD, 2 INT

Top rushers

- PIT – Jerome Bettis – 14 rushes, 57 yards
- JAX – James Stewart – 25 rushes, 77 yards, TD

Top receivers

- PIT – Andre Hastings – 3 receptions, 34 yards
- JAX – Keenan McCardell – 6 receptions, 94 yards

==== Week 2: vs. Houston Oilers ====
Week Two: Houston Oilers at Jacksonville Jaguars – Game summary

Quarter	1	2	3	4	Total
**Oilers**	10	14	7	3	**34**
Jaguars	10	3	7	7	**27**

at Jacksonville Municipal Stadium, Jacksonville, Florida

- Date: September 8, 1996
- Game time: 1:00 p.m. EDT
- Game weather: 87 °F (31 °C)
- Game attendance: 66,468
- Referee: Walt Coleman
- Recap, Game Book

Game information

**First quarter**

- JAX – Mike Hollis 38-yard field goal, 12:47. Jaguars 3–0. **Drive: 4 plays, 6 yards, 2:00.**
- HOU – Al Del Greco 32-yard field goal, 9:24. Tied 3–3. **Drive: 7 plays, 58 yards, 3:23.**
- JAC – James Stewart 5-yard run (Mike Hollis kick), 3:25. Jaguars 10–3. **Drive: 10 plays, 77 yards, 5:59.**
- HOU – Eddie George 1-yard run (Al Del Greco kick), 0:48. Tied 10–10. **Drive: 7 plays, 31 yards, 2:37.**

**Second quarter**

- HOU – Malcolm Floyd 63-yard pass from Chris Chandler (Al Del Greco kick), 13:10. Oilers 17–10. **Drive: 3 plays, 90 yards, 1:34.**
- JAX – Mike Hollis 37-yard field goal, 5:51. Oilers 17–13. **Drive: 9 plays, 35 yards, 4:12.**
- HOU – Frank Wycheck 7-yard pass from Chris Chandler (Al Del Greco kick), 0:47. Oilers 24–13. **Drive: 11 plays, 80 yards, 5:04.**

**Third quarter**

- HOU – Willie Davis 11-yard pass from Chris Chandler (Al Del Greco kick), 7:08. Oilers 31–13. **Drive: 3 plays, 79 yards, 2:04.**
- JAX – Jimmy Smith 5-yard pass from Mark Brunell (Mike Hollis kick), 2:47. Oilers 31–20. **Drive: 7 plays, 80 yards, 4:21.**

**Fourth quarter**

- HOU – Al Del Greco 29-yard field goal, 7:27. Oilers 34–20. **Drive: 16 plays, 68 yards, 10:20.**
- JAX – Keenan McCardell 3-yard pass from Mark Brunell (Mike Hollis kick), 2:33. Oilers 34–27. **Drive: 1 play, 3 yards, 0:04.**

Top passers

- HOU – Chris Chandler – 14/22, 226 yards, 3 TD
- JAX – Mark Brunell – 27/38, 302 yards, 2 TD, 2 INT

Top rushers

- HOU – Eddie George – 17 rushes, 143 yards, TD
- JAX – James Stewart – 17 rushes, 58 yards, TD

Top receivers

- HOU – Malcolm Floyd – 3 receptions, 90 yards, TD
- JAX – Keenan McCardell – 8 receptions, 100 yards, TD

==== Week 3: at Oakland Raiders ====
Week Three: Jacksonville Jaguars at Oakland Raiders – Game summary

Quarter	1	2	3	4	Total
Jaguars	0	0	3	0	**3**
**Raiders**	0	10	0	7	**17**

at Oakland-Alameda County Coliseum, Oakland, California

- Date: September 15, 1996
- Game time: 4:00 p.m. EDT
- Game weather: 67 °F (19 °C)
- Game attendance: 46,291
- Referee: Red Cashion
- Recap, Game Book

Game information

**First quarter**

- No scoring plays.

**Second quarter**

- OAK – Tim Brown 19-yard pass from Jeff Hostetler (Cole Ford kick), 5:46. Raiders 7–0. **Drive: 4 plays, 55 yards, 2:00.**
- OAK – Cole Ford 32-yard field goal, 0:58. Raiders 10–0. **Drive: 9 plays, 36 yards, 2:48.**

**Third quarter**

- JAX – Mike Hollis 33-yard field goal, 4:40. Raiders 10–3. **Drive: 6 plays, 27 yards, 2:48.**

**Fourth quarter**

- OAK – Jerry Ball 66-yard interception return (Cole Ford kick), 2:15. Raiders 17–3.

Top passers

- JAX – Mark Brunell – 18/37, 217 yards, 2 INT
- HOU – Jeff Hostetler – 18/27, 200 yards, TD, 2 INT

Top rushers

- JAX – James Stewart – 8 rushes, 52 yards
- HOU – Napoleon Kaufman – 7 rushes, 54 yards

Top receivers

- JAX – Keenan McCardell – 4 receptions, 72 yards
- HOU – Tim Brown – 5 receptions, 60 yards, TD

==== Week 4: at New England Patriots ====
Week Four: Jacksonville Jaguars at New England Patriots – Game summary

Quarter	1	2	3	4	OT	Total
Jaguars	0	7	15	3	0	**25**
**Patriots**	9	13	3	0	3	**28**

at Foxboro Stadium, Foxboro, Massachusetts

- Date: September 22, 1996
- Game time: 1:00 p.m. EDT
- Game weather: Cloudy, 71 °F (22 °C)
- Game attendance: 59,446
- Referee: Larry Nemers
- Recap, Game Book

Game information

**First quarter**

- NE – Ben Coates 5-yard pass from Drew Bledsoe (kick failed), 6:38. Patriots 6–0. **Drive: 12 plays, 67 yards, 6:51.**
- NE – Adam Vinatieri 23-yard field goal, 1:17. Patriots 9–0. **Drive: 7 plays, 36 yards, 2:32.**

**Second quarter**

- NE – Adam Vinatieri 30-yard field goal, 9:50. Patriots 12–0. **Drive: 7 plays, 25 yards, 2:54.**
- NE – Curtis Martin 4-yard run (Adam Vinatieri kick), 5:29. Patriots 19–0. **Drive: 8 plays, 36 yards, 3:11.**
- NE – Adam Vinatieri 29-yard field goal, 1:06. Patriots 22–0. **Drive: 4 plays, 3 yards, 1:49.**
- JAX – Jimmy Smith 51-yard pass from Mark Brunell (Mike Hollis kick), 0:00. Patriots 22–7. **Drive: 7 plays, 74 yards, 1:06.**

**Third quarter**

- JAX – Andre Rison 41-yard pass from Mark Brunell (Mike Hollis kick), 11:33. Patriots 22–14. **Drive: 8 plays, 75 yards, 3:27.**
- NE – Adam Vinatieri 41-yard field goal, 1:35. Patriots 25–14. **Drive: 6 plays, 34 yards, 2:44.**
- JAX – Andre Rison 61-yard pass from Mark Brunell (Mark Brunell run), 1:09. Patriots 25–22. **Drive: 1 play, 61 yards, 0:26.**

**Fourth quarter**

- JAX – Mike Hollis 27-yard field goal, 8:26. Tied 25–25. **Drive: 10 plays, 53 yards, 6:18.**

**Overtime**

- NE – Adam Vinatieri 40-yard field goal, 12:24. Patriots 28–25. **Drive: 6 plays, 49 yards, 2:36.**

Top passers

- JAX – Mark Brunell – 23/39, 432 yards, 3 TD, INT
- NE – Drew Bledsoe – 27/44, 255 yards, TD, INT

Top rushers

- JAX – Mark Brunell – 2 rushes, 24 yards
- NE – Curtis Martin – 24 rushes, 95 yards, TD

Top receivers

- JAX – Andre Rison – 4 receptions, 115 yards, 2 TD
- NE – Terry Glenn – 6 receptions, 89 yards

==== Week 5: vs. Carolina Panthers ====
Week Five: Carolina Panthers at Jacksonville Jaguars – Game summary

Quarter	1	2	3	4	Total
Panthers	0	0	6	8	**14**
**Jaguars**	14	3	0	7	**24**

at Jacksonville Municipal Stadium, Jacksonville, Florida

- Date: September 29, 1996
- Game time: 1:00 p.m. EDT
- Game weather: Hazy, 84 °F (29 °C)
- Game attendance: 71,537
- Referee: Gary Lane
- Recap, Game Book

Game information

**First quarter**

- JAX – James Stewart 1-yard run (Mike Hollis kick), 9:20. Jaguars 3–0. **Drive: 8 plays, 59 yards, 4:38.**
- JAX – Jimmy Smith 8-yard pass from Mark Brunell (Mike Hollis kick), 1:59. Jaguars 10–0. **Drive: 10 plays, 68 yards, 4:58.**

**Second quarter**

- JAX – Mike Hollis 53-yard field goal, 0:00. Jaguars 13–0. **Drive: 3 plays, 21 yards, 0:16.**

**Third quarter**

- CAR – Mark Carrier 24-yard pass from Steve Beuerlein (kick failed), 10:38. Jaguars 13–6. **Drive: 5 plays, 39 yards, 1:13.**

**Fourth quarter**

- JAX – James Stewart 4-yard run (Mike Hollis kick), 11:47. Jaguars 24–6. **Drive: 15 plays, 80 yards, 7:57.**
- CAR – Mark Carrier 3-yard pass from Kerry Collins (Kerry Collins run), 4:07. Jaguars 24–14. **Drive: 8 plays, 64 yards, 1:34.**

Top passers

- CAR – Steve Beuerlein – 15/30, 219 yards, TD
- JAX – Mark Brunell – 15/27, 214 yards, TD, INT

Top rushers

- CAR – Anthony Johnson – 12 rushes, 31 yards
- JAX – James Stewart – 12 rushes, 96 yards, 2 TD

Top receivers

- CAR – Mark Carrier – 8 receptions, 124 yards, 2 TD
- JAX – Keenan McCardell – 3 receptions, 67 yards

==== Week 6: at New Orleans Saints ====
Week Six: Jacksonville Jaguars at New Orleans Saints – Game summary

Quarter	1	2	3	4	Total
Jaguars	0	7	3	3	**13**
**Saints**	10	0	0	7	**17**

at Louisiana Superdome, New Orleans, Louisiana

- Date: October 6, 1996
- Game time: 4:00 p.m. EST
- Game weather: None (indoor stadium)
- Game attendance: 34,231
- Referee: Dick Hantak
- Recap, Game Book

Game information

**First quarter**

- NO – Mario Bates 1-yard run (Doug Brien kick), 5:35. Saints 7–0. **Drive: 10 plays, 79 yards, 5:17.**
- NO – Doug Brien 27-yard field goal. Saints 10–0, 2:26. **Drive: 4 plays, -2 yards, 2:50.**

**Second quarter**

- JAX – James Stewart 21-yard pass from Mark Brunell (Mike Hollis kick), 4:42. Saints 10–7. **Drive: 9 plays, 59 yards, 5:36.**

**Third quarter**

- JAX – Mike Hollis 38-yard field goal, 2:53. Tied 10–10. **Drive: 4 plays, 3 yards, 2:52.**

**Fourth quarter**

- JAX – Mike Hollis 19-yard field goal, 5:15. Jaguars 13–10. **Drive: 13 plays, 64 yards, 7:44.**
- NO – Torrance Small 6-yard pass from Jim Everett (Doug Brien kick), 1:45. Saints 17–13. **Drive: 9 plays, 81 yards, 3:30.**

Top passers

- JAX – Mark Brunell – 28/35, 250 yards, TD
- NO – Jim Everett – 15/28, 161 yards, TD, INT

Top rushers

- JAX – James Stewart – 24 rushes, 79 yards, TD
- NO – Mario Bates – 16 rushes, 39 yards, TD

Top receivers

- JAX – Keenan McCardell – 8 receptions, 86 yards
- NO – Torrance Small – 4 receptions, 59 yards, TD

==== Week 7: vs. New York Jets ====
Week Seven: New York Jets at Jacksonville Jaguars – Game summary

Quarter	1	2	3	4	Total
Jets	7	7	0	3	**17**
**Jaguars**	3	11	7	0	**21**

at Jacksonville Municipal Stadium, Jacksonville, Florida

- Date: October 13, 1996
- Game time: 1:00 p.m. EST
- Game weather: Partly cloudy, 72 °F (22 °C)
- Game attendance: 65,699
- Referee: Gerry Austin
- Recap, Game Book

Game information

**First quarter**

- JAX – Mike Hollis 35-yard field goal, 13:25. Jaguars 3–0. **Drive: 4 plays, 5 yards, 1:35.**
- NYJ – Adrian Murrell 14-yard pass from Frank Reich (Nick Lowery kick), 6:43. Jets 7–3. **Drive: 7 plays, 59 yards, 2:54.**

**Second quarter**

- NYJ – Wayne Chrebet 12-yard pass from Frank Reich (Nick Lowery kick), 14:52. Jets 14–3. **Drive: 10 plays, 69 yards, 4:37.**
- JAX – Mike Hollis 40-yard field goal, 7:27. Jets 14–7. **Drive: 7 plays, 15 yards, 2:45.**
- JAX – Jimmy Smith 15-yard pass from Mark Brunell (pass succeeded), 1:51. Tied 14–14. **Drive: 5 plays, 93 yards, 1:52.**

**Third quarter**

- JAX – Willie Jackson 41-yard pass from Mark Brunell (Mike Hollis kick), 6:19. Jaguars 21–14. **Drive: 3 plays, 49 yards, 1:22.**

**Fourth quarter**

- NYJ – Nick Lowery 20-yard field goal, 10:59. Jaguars 21–17. **Drive: 10 plays, 58 yards, 5:01.**

Top passers

- NYJ – Frank Reich – 23/43, 276 yards, 2 TD, 2 INT
- JAX – Mark Brunell – 14/23, 248 yards, 2 TD

Top rushers

- NYJ – Adrian Murrell – 21 rushes, 49 yards
- JAX – James Stewart – 12 rushes, 55 yards

Top receivers

- NYJ – Wayne Chrebet – 12 receptions, 162 yards, TD
- JAX – Jimmy Smith – 5 receptions, 135 yards, TD

==== Week 8: at St. Louis Rams ====
Week Eight: Jacksonville Jaguars at St. Louis Rams – Game summary

Quarter	1	2	3	4	Total
Jaguars	0	7	7	0	**14**
**Rams**	10	0	7	0	**17**

at TWA Dome, St. Louis, Missouri

- Date: October 20, 1996
- Game time: 4:00 p.m. EST
- Game weather: None (indoor stadium)
- Game attendance: 60,066
- Referee: Dale Hamer
- Recap, Game Book

Game information

**First quarter**

- STL – Anthony Parker 92-yard interception return (Chip Lohmiller kick), 9:20. Rams 7-0.
- STL – Chip Lohmiller 25-yard field goal, 7:08. Rams 10–0. **Drive: 4 plays, 9 yards, 2:01.**

**Second quarter**

- JAX – James Stewart 1-yard run (Mike Hollis kick), 7:13. Rams 10–7. **Drive: 13 plays, 71 yards, 6:50.**

**Third quarter**

- JAX – James Stewart 8-yard run (Mike Hollis kick), 11:26. Jaguars 14–10. **Drive: 4 plays, 78 yards, 2:04.**
- STL – Eddie Kennison 29-yard pass from Tony Banks (Chip Lohmiller kick), 6:44. Rams 17–14. **Drive: 9 plays, 86 yards, 4:42.**

**Fourth quarter**

- No scoring plays.

Top passers

- JAX – Mark Brunell – 37/52, 421 yards, 5 INT
- STL – Tony Banks – 9/17, 129 yards, TD, INT

Top rushers

- JAX – James Stewart – 29 rushes, 112 yards, 2 TD
- STL – Lawrence Phillips – 12 rushes, 37 yards

Top receivers

- JAX – Keenan McCardell – 16 receptions, 232 yards
- STL – Eddie Kennison – 2 receptions, 71 yards, TD

==== Week 9: at Cincinnati Bengals ====
Week Nine: Jacksonville Jaguars at Cincinnati Bengals – Game summary

Quarter	1	2	3	4	Total
Jaguars	0	7	7	7	**21**
**Bengals**	0	7	0	21	**28**

at Cinergy Field, Cincinnati, Ohio

- Date: October 27, 1996
- Game time: 1:00 p.m. EST
- Game weather: Partly cloudy, 72 °F (22 °C)
- Game attendance: 45,890
- Referee: Bob McElwee
- Recap, Game Book

Game information

**First quarter**

- No scoring plays.

**Second quarter**

- JAX – Mark Brunell 14-yard run (Mike Hollis kick), 12:39. Jaguars 7–0. **Drive: 7 plays, 75 yards, 2:41.**
- CIN – Carl Pickens 11-yard pass from Jeff Blake (Doug Pelfrey kick), 7:54. Tied 7–7. **Drive: 5 plays, 31 yards, 1:47.**

**Third quarter**

- JAX – Natrone Means 11-yard pass from Mark Brunell (Mike Hollis kick), 2:41. Jaguars 14–7. **Drive: 8 plays, 73 yards, 4:17.**

**Fourth quarter**

- CIN – Carl Pickens 10-yard pass from Jeff Blake (Doug Pelfrey kick), 14:54. Tied 14–14. **Drive: 6 plays, 67 yards, 2:47.**
- CIN – Ki-Jana Carter 1-yard run (Doug Pelfrey kick), 6:10. Bengals 21–14. **Drive: 11 plays, 60 yards, 5:31.**
- CIN – Ki-Jana Carter 4-yard run (Doug Pelfrey kick), 3:32. Bengals 28–14. **Drive: 5 plays, 22 yards, 2:18.**
- JAX – Jimmy Smith 11-yard pass from Mark Brunell (Mike Hollis kick), 1:35. Bengals 28–21. **Drive: 9 plays, 79 yards, 1:57.**

Top passers

- JAX – Mark Brunell – 18/31, 215 yards, 2 TD, 2 INT
- CIN – Jeff Blake – 19/30, 244 yards, 2 TD

Top rushers

- JAX – James Stewart – 14 rushes, 80 yards
- CIN – Ki-Jana Carter – 8 rushes, 27 yards, 2 TD

Top receivers

- JAX – Andre Rison – 3 receptions, 74 yards
- CIN – David Dunn – 3 receptions, 66 yards

==== Week 11: vs. Baltimore Ravens ====
Week Eleven: Baltimore Ravens at Jacksonville Jaguars – Game summary

Quarter	1	2	3	4	Total
Ravens	7	10	3	7	**27**
**Jaguars**	0	3	10	17	**30**

at Jacksonville Municipal Stadium, Jacksonville, Florida

- Date: November 10, 1996
- Game time: 4:00 p.m. EST
- Game weather: Clear, 64 °F (18 °C)
- Game attendance: 64,628
- Referee: Jerry Markbeit
- Recap, Game Book

Game information

**First quarter**

- BAL – Michael Jackson 5-yard pass from Vinny Testaverde (Matt Stover kick), 6:15. Ravens 7–0. **Drive: 9 plays, 45 yards, 5:38.**

**Second quarter**

- JAX – Mike Hollis 23-yard field goal, 6:33. Ravens 7–3. **Drive: 6 plays, 27 yards, 2:37.**
- BAL – Bam Morris 52-yard pass from Vinny Testaverde (Matt Stover kick), 5:39. Ravens 14–3. **Drive: 2 plays, 70 yards, 0:54.**
- BAL – Matt Stover 21-yard field goal, 0:05. Ravens 17–3. **Drive: 11 plays, 57 yards, 3:57.**

**Third quarter**

- JAX – James Stewart 10-yard run (Mike Hollis kick), 12:53. Ravens 17–10. **Drive: 5 plays, 84 yards, 2:07.**
- BAL – Matt Stover 21-yard field goal, 7:01. Ravens 20–10. **Drive: 11 plays, 64 yards, 5:52.**
- JAX – Mike Hollis 33-yard field goal, 4:05. Ravens 20–13. **Drive: 4 plays, 4 yards, 1:09.**

**Fourth quarter**

- JAX – Mike Hollis 24-yard field goal, 11:11. Ravens 20–16. **Drive: 13 plays, 89 yards, 5:40.**
- BAL – Derrick Alexander 21-yard pass from Vinny Testaverde (Matt Stover kick), 6:23. Ravens 27–16. **Drive: 11 plays, 88 yards, 4:48.**
- JAX – James Stewart 8-yard pass from Mark Brunell (pass failed), 3:50. Ravens 27–22. **Drive: 9 plays, 90 yards, 2:33.**
- JAX – Mark Brunell 1-yard run (pass succeeded), 0:41. Jaguars 30–27. **Drive: 8 plays, 66 yards, 1:50.**

Top passers

- BAL – Vinny Testaverde – 17/27, 253 yards, 3 TD
- JAX – Mark Brunell – 24/37, 354 yards, TD, INT

Top rushers

- BAL – Bam Morris – 26 rushes, 109 yards
- JAX – Mark Brunell – 7 rushes, 58 yards, TD

Top receivers

- BAL – Derrick Alexander – 4 receptions, 65 yards, TD
- JAX – Pete Mitchell – 6 receptions, 80 yards

==== Week 12: at Pittsburgh Steelers ====
Week Twelve: Jacksonville Jaguars at Pittsburgh Steelers – Game summary

Quarter	1	2	3	4	Total
Jaguars	0	3	0	0	**3**
**Steelers**	0	14	14	0	**28**

at Three Rivers Stadium, Pittsburgh, Pennsylvania

- Date: November 17, 1996
- Game time: 1:00 p.m. EST
- Game weather: Partly cloudy, 47 °F (8 °C)
- Game attendance: 58,879
- Referee: Bernie Kukar
- Recap, Game Book

Game information

**First quarter**

- No scoring plays.

**Second quarter**

- PIT – Yancy Thigpen 12-yard pass from Mike Tomczak (Norm Johnson kick), 13:21. Steelers 7–0. **Drive: 8 plays, 44 yards, 3:11.**
- PIT – Jerome Bettis 3-yard run (Norm Johnson kick), 12:16. Steelers 14–0. **Drive: 1 play, 3 yards, 0:05.**
- JAX – Mike Hollis 40-yard field goal, 0:00. Steelers 14–3. **Drive: 10 plays, 65 yards, 1:58.**

**Third quarter**

- PIT – Carnell Lake 85-yard fumble return (Norm Johnson kick), 8:18. Steelers 21–3.
- PIT – Yancy Thigpen 27-yard pass from Mike Tomczak (Norm Johnson kick), 0:56. Steelers 28–3. **Drive: 6 plays, 58 yards, 3:15.**

**Fourth quarter**

- No scoring plays.

Top passers

- JAX – Mark Brunell – 28/47, 215 yards, 2 INT
- PIT – Mike Tomczak – 7/24, 109 yards, 2 TD, INT

Top rushers

- JAX – James Stewart – 14 rushes, 62 yards
- PIT – Jerome Bettis – 21 rushes, 53 yards, TD

Top receivers

- JAX – Willie Jackson – 8 receptions, 69 yards
- CLE – Yancey Thigpen – 4 receptions, 79 yards, 2 TD

==== Week 13: at Baltimore Ravens ====
Week Thirteen: Jacksonville Jaguars at Baltimore Ravens – Game summary

Quarter	1	2	3	4	OT	Total
**Jaguars**	0	10	0	15	3	**28**
Ravens	7	9	9	0	0	**25**

at Memorial Stadium, Baltimore, Maryland

- Date: November 24, 1996
- Game time: 1:00 p.m. EST
- Game weather: Partly cloudy, 50 °F (10 °C)
- Game attendance: 57,384
- Referee: Howard Roe
- Recap, Game Book

Game information

**First quarter**

- BAL – Mike Caldwell 45-yard interception return (Matt Stover kick), 12:30. Ravens 7–0.

**Second quarter**

- BAL – Matt Stover 21-yard field goal, 14:18. Ravens 10–0. **Drive: 9 plays, 49 yards, 3:58.**
- JAX – James Stewart 1-yard run (Mike Hollis kick), 13:00. Ravens 10–7. **Drive: 3 plays, 71 yards, 1:18.**
- BAL – Matt Stover 29-yard field goal, 5:16. Ravens 13–7. **Drive: 15 plays, 80 yards, 7:44.**
- JAX – Mike Hollis 29-yard field goal, 1:03. Ravens 13–10. **Drive: 9 plays, 55 yards, 4:13.**
- BAL – Matt Stover 41-yard field goal, 0:06. Ravens 16–10. **Drive: 7 plays, 49 yards, 0:57.**

**Third quarter**

- BAL – Bam Morris 1-yard run (run failed), 10:39. Ravens 22–10. **Drive: 8 plays, 54 yards, 4:21.**
- BAL – Matt Stover 33-yard field goal, 1:35. Ravens 25–10. **Drive: 11 plays, 58 yards, 4:39.**

**Fourth quarter**

- JAX – Pete Mitchell 11-yard pass from Mark Brunell (Mike Hollis kick), 12:04. Ravens 25–17. **Drive: 12 plays, 74 yards, 4:31.**
- JAX – Willie Jackson 7-yard pass from Mark Brunell (run succeeded), 1:24. Tied 25–25. **Drive: 6 plays, 19 yards, 1:19.**

**Overtime**

- JAX – Mike Hollis 34-yard field goal, 5:54. Jaguars 28–25. **Drive: 9 plays, 48 yards, 5:05.**

Top passers

- JAX – Mark Brunell – 28/46, 306 yards, 2 TD, 2 INT
- BAL – Vinny Testaverde – 31/50, 366 yards

Top rushers

- JAX – Natrone Means – 10 rushes, 39 yards
- BAL – Bam Morris – 22 rushes, 60 yards, TD

Top receivers

- JAX – Jimmy Smith – 8 receptions, 131 yards
- BAL – Michael Jackson – 9 receptions, 150 yards

==== Week 14: vs. Cincinnati Bengals ====
Week Fourteen: Cincinnati Bengals at Jacksonville Jaguars – Game summary

Quarter	1	2	3	4	Total
Bengals	7	10	3	7	**27**
**Jaguars**	13	3	11	3	**30**

at Jacksonville Municipal Stadium, Jacksonville, Florida

- Date: December 1, 1996
- Game time: 1:00 p.m. EST
- Game weather: Steady rain, 71 °F (22 °C)
- Game attendance: 57,408
- Referee: Tom White
- Recap, Game Book

Game information

**First quarter**

- JAX – Mickey Washington 65-yard blocked field goal return (Mike Hollis kick), 11:28. Jaguars 7–0.
- JAX – Mike Hollis 25-yard field goal, 6:24. Jaguars 10–0. **Drive: 9 plays, 32 yards, 4:00.**
- CIN – Carl Pickens 23-yard pass from Jeff Blake (Doug Pelfrey kick), 3:26. Jaguars 10–7. **Drive: 5 plays, 42 yards, 2:58.**
- JAX – Mike Hollis 46-yard field goal, 2:05. Jaguars 13–7. **Drive: 5 plays, 57 yards, 1:21.**

**Second quarter**

- CIN – Doug Pelfrey 22-yard field goal, 11:35. Jaguars 13–10. **Drive: 11 plays, 66 yards, 5:30.**
- CIN – Carl Pickens 8-yard pass from Jeff Blake (Doug Pelfrey kick), 7:27. Bengals 17–13. **Drive: 4 plays, 80 yards, 1:53.**
- JAX – Mike Hollis 40-yard field goal, 0:05. Bengals 17–16. **Drive: 5 plays, 48 yards, 0:34.**

**Third quarter**

- JAX – Mike Hollis 39-yard field goal, 10:09. Jaguars 19–17. **Drive: 8 plays, 47 yards, 4:51.**
- CIN – Doug Pelfrey 34-yard field goal, 4:42. Bengals 20–19. **Drive: 12 plays, 60 yards, 5:27.**
- JAX – Keenan McCardell 48-yard pass from Mark Brunell (pass succeeded), 1:33. Jaguars 27–20. **Drive: 5 plays, 60 yards, 3:09.**

**Fourth quarter**

- JAX – Mike Hollis 20-yard field goal, 2:04. Jaguars 30–20. **Drive: 12 plays, 74 yards, 5:44.**
- CIN – Carl Pickens 25-yard pass from Jeff Blake (Doug Pelfrey kick), 0:15. Jaguars 30–27. **Drive: 8 plays, 83 yards, 1:49.**

Top passers

- CIN – Jeff Blake – 23/39, 313 yards, 3 TD, 2 INT
- JAX – Mark Brunell – 21/34, 356 yards, TD

Top rushers

- CIN – Garrison Hearst – 18 rushes, 78 yards
- JAX – Natrone Means – 21 rushes, 56 yards

Top receivers

- CIN – Carl Pickens – 7 receptions, 109 yards, 3 TD
- JAX – Jimmy Smith – 7 receptions, 162 yards

==== Week 15: at Houston Oilers ====
Week Fifteen: Jacksonville Jaguars at Houston Oilers – Game summary

Quarter	1	2	3	4	Total
**Jaguars**	7	3	7	6	**23**
Oilers	0	7	0	10	**17**

at Houston Astrodome, Houston, Texas

- Date: December 8, 1996
- Game time: 1:00 p.m. EST
- Game weather: None (indoor stadium)
- Game attendance: 20,196
- Referee: Dick Hantak
- Recap, Game Book

Game information

**First quarter**

- JAX – Natrone Means 1-yard run (Mike Hollis kick), 8:56. Jaguars 7–0. **Drive: 11 plays, 73 yards, 6:04.**

**Second quarter**

- HOU – Ronnie Harmon 23-yard pass from Steve McNair (Al Del Greco kick), 11:33. Tied 7–7. **Drive: 3 plays, 26 yards, 1:38.**
- JAX – Mike Hollis 34-yard field goal, 1:49. Jaguars 10–7. **Drive: 7 plays, 36 yards, 3:04.**

**Third quarter**

- JAX – Natrone Means 5-yard run (Mike Hollis kick), 1:00. Jaguars 17–7. **Drive: 9 plays, 53 yards, 4:31.**

**Fourth quarter**

- HOU – Eddie George 6-yard run (Al Del Greco kick), 13:11. Jaguars 17–14. **Drive: 5 plays, 53 yards, 2:49.**
- JAX – Mike Hollis 38-yard field goal, 6:13. Jaguars 20–14. **Drive: 8 plays, 37 yards, 3:57.**
- JAX – Mike Hollis 31-yard field goal, 1:56. Jaguars 23–14. **Drive: 6 plays, 19 yards, 1:25.**
- HOU – Al Del Greco 27-yard field goal, 0:11. Jaguars 23–17. **Drive: 9 plays, 58 yards, 1:45.**

Top passers

- JAX – Mark Brunell – 15/25, 172 yards
- HOU – Steve McNair – 24/37, 308 yards, TD, INT

Top rushers

- JAX – Natrone Means – 25 rushes, 67 yards, 2 TD
- HOU – Eddie George – 16 rushes, 45 yards, TD

Top receivers

- JAX – Keenan McCardell – 3 receptions, 68 yards
- HOU – Chris Sanders – 7 receptions, 127 yards

==== Week 16: vs. Seattle Seahawks ====
Week Sixteen: Seattle Seahawks at Jacksonville Jaguars – Game summary

Quarter	1	2	3	4	Total
Seahawks	0	10	3	0	**13**
**Jaguars**	7	0	0	13	**20**

at Jacksonville Municipal Stadium, Jacksonville, Florida

- Date: December 15, 1996
- Game time: 8:00 p.m. EST
- Game weather: Clear, 47 °F (8 °C)
- Game attendance: 66,134
- Referee: Red Cashion
- Recap, Game Book

Game information

**First quarter**

- JAX – Jimmy Smith 12-yard pass from Mark Brunell (Mike Hollis kick), 2:05. Jaguars 7–0. **Drive: 11 plays, 79 yards, 6:10.**

**Second quarter**

- SEA – Todd Peterson 27-yard field goal, 10:29. Jaguars 7–3. **Drive: 11 plays, 63 yards, 6:36.**
- SEA – Ricky Proehl 10-yard pass from Rick Mirer (Todd Peterson kick), 0:36. Seahawks 10–7. **Drive: 14 plays, 73 yards, 5:04.**

**Third quarter**

- SEA – Todd Peterson 24-yard field goal, 1:54. Seahawks 13–7. **Drive: 7 plays, 63 yards, 3:57.**

**Fourth quarter**

- JAX – Jimmy Smith 39-yard pass from Mark Brunell (Mike Hollis kick), 14:53. Jaguars 14–13. **Drive: 5 plays, 57 yards, 2:01.**
- JAX – Mike Hollis 19-yard field goal, 9:55. Jaguars 17–13. **Drive: 7 plays, 33 yards, 3:25.**
- JAX – Mike Hollis 39-yard field goal, 2:48. Jaguars 20–13. **Drive: 10 plays, 56 yards, 5:21.**

Top passers

- SEA – Rick Mirer – 16/31, 156 yards, TD, INT
- JAX – Mark Brunell – 19/26, 231 yards, 2 TD

Top rushers

- SEA – Lamar Smith – 16 rushes, 59 yards
- JAX – Natrone Means – 23 rushes, 92 yards

Top receivers

- SEA – Carlester Crumpler – 5 receptions, 58 yards
- JAX – Jimmy Smith – 8 receptions, 124 yards, 2 TD

==== Week 17: vs. Atlanta Falcons ====
Week Seventeen: Atlanta Falcons at Jacksonville Jaguars – Game summary

Quarter	1	2	3	4	Total
Falcons	0	3	7	7	**17**
**Jaguars**	7	6	3	3	**19**

at Jacksonville Municipal Stadium, Jacksonville, Florida

- Date: December 22, 1996
- Game time: 1:00 p.m. EST
- Game weather: Clear, 59 °F (15 °C)
- Game attendance: 71,449
- Referee: Dale Hamer
- TV announcers (FOX): Kevin Harlan, Bill Maas
- Recap, Game Book

Game information

**First quarter**

- JAX – Mark Brunell 11-yard run (Mike Hollis kick), 7:54. Jaguars 7–0. **Drive: 10 plays, 77 yards, 5:31.**

**Second quarter**

- ATL – Morten Andersen 46-yard field goal, 12:25. Jaguars 7–3. **Drive: 7 plays, 28 yards, 3:26.**
- JAX – Mike Hollis 23-yard field goal, 6:12. Jaguars 10–3. **Drive: 12 plays, 70 yards, 6:13.**
- JAX – Mike Hollis 26-yard field goal, 0:42. Jaguars 13–3. **Drive: 13 plays, 76 yards, 3:06.**

**Third quarter**

- JAX – Mike Hollis 22-yard field goal, 8:11. Jaguars 16–3. **Drive: 13 plays, 76 yards, 6:49.**
- ATL – Eric Metcalf 4-yard pass from Bobby Hebert (Morten Andersen kick), 2:34. Jaguars 16–10. **Drive: 10 plays, 72 yards, 5:37.**

**Fourth quarter**

- JAX – Mike Hollis 42-yard field goal, 13:00. Jaguars 19–10. **Drive: 10 plays, 51 yards, 4:34.**
- ATL – Craig Heyward 2-yard run (Morten Andersen kick), 5:39. Jaguars 19–17. **Drive: 12 plays, 77 yards, 7:21.**

Top passers

- ATL – Bobby Hebert – 17/25, 172 yards, TD
- JAX – Mark Brunell – 18/29, 222 yards

Top rushers

- ATL – Craig Heyward – 16 rushes, 69 yards, TD
- JAX – Natrone Means – 27 rushes, 110 yards

Top receivers

- ATL – Bert Emanuel – 6 receptions, 67 yards
- JAX – Jimmy Smith – 5 receptions, 75 yards

=== Standings ===
AFC Central
	W	L	T	PCT	PF	PA	STK
^{(3)} Pittsburgh Steelers	10	6	0	.625	344	257	L2
^{(5)} Jacksonville Jaguars	9	7	0	.563	325	335	W5
Cincinnati Bengals	8	8	0	.500	372	369	W3
Houston Oilers	8	8	0	.500	345	319	W1
Baltimore Ravens	4	12	0	.250	371	441	L3

== Postseason ==
=== Schedule ===
Round	Date	Opponent	Result	Record	Venue	Attendance
Wild Card	December 28	at Buffalo Bills (4)	W 30–27	1–0	Rich Stadium	70,213
Divisional	January 4, 1997	at Denver Broncos (1)	W 30–27	2–0	Mile High Stadium	75,678
AFC Championship	January 12, 1997	at New England Patriots (2)	L 6–20	2–1	Foxboro Stadium	60,190

=== Game summaries ===
==== AFC Wild Card Playoffs: vs (4) Buffalo Bills ====
AFC Wild Card Playoffs: (5) Jacksonville Jaguars at (4) Buffalo Bills – Game summary

Quarter	1	2	3	4	Total
Jaguars	10	7	3	10	30
Bills	14	3	3	7	27

at Rich Stadium, Buffalo, NY

- Date: December 28, 1996
- Game time: 12:30 p.m. EST
- Game weather: Cloudy, 49 °F (9 °C)
- Game attendance: 70,213
- Referee: Gary Lane
- Recap, Game Book

Game information

First quarter

- BUF – Thurman Thomas 7-yard pass from Jim Kelly (Steve Christie kick), 11:30. Bills 7–0. Drive: 6 plays, 43 yards, 2:22.
- JAX – Clyde Simmons 20-yard interception return (Mike Hollis kick), 6:26. Tied 7–7.
- BUF – Thurman Thomas 2-yard run (Steve Christie kick), 2:26. Bills 14–7. Drive: 10 plays, 68 yards, 4:00.
- JAX – Mike Hollis 27-yard field goal, 0:10. Bills 14–10. Drive: 5 plays, 63 yards, 2:16.

Second quarter

- JAX – Natrone Means 30-yard run (Mike Hollis kick), 3:45. Jaguars 17–14. Drive: 6 plays, 84 yards, 3:03.
- BUF – Steve Christie 33-yard field goal, 1:56. Tied 17–17. Drive: 5 plays, 27 yards, 1:49.

Third quarter

- BUF – Steve Christie 47-yard field goal, 10:20. Bills 20–17. Drive: 11 plays, 33 yards, 4:40.
- JAX – Mike Hollis 24-yard field goal, 2:45. Tied 20–20. Drive: 11 plays, 62 yards, 4:13.

Fourth quarter

- BUF – Jeff Burris 38-yard interception return (Steve Christie kick), 14:17. Bills 27–20.
- JAX – Jimmy Smith 2-yard pass from Mark Brunell (Mike Hollis kick), 8:40. Tied 27–27. Drive: 10 plays, 65 yards, 5:37.
- JAX – Mike Hollis 45-yard field goal, 3:07. Jaguars 30–27. Drive: 8 plays, 31 yards, 4:06.

Top passers

- JAX – Mark Brunell – 18/33, 239 yards, TD, 2 INT
- BUF – Jim Kelly – 21/32, 239 yards, TD, INT

Top rushers

- JAX – Natrone Means – 31 rushes, 175 yards, TD
- BUF – Thurman Thomas – 14 rushes, 50 yards, TD

Top receivers

- JAX – Keenan McCardell – 4 receptions, 76 yards
- BUF – Quinn Early – 9 receptions, 122 yards

==== AFC Divisional Playoffs: vs (1) Denver Broncos ====
AFC Divisional Playoffs: (5) Jacksonville Jaguars at (1) Denver Broncos – Game summary

Quarter	1	2	3	4	Total
Jaguars	0	13	7	10	30
Broncos	12	0	0	15	27

at Mile High Stadium, Denver, CO

- Date: January 4, 1997
- Game time: 2:00 p.m. MST
- Game weather: Mostly clear, 46 °F (8 °C)
- Game attendance: 75,678
- Referee: Red Cashion
- Recap, Game Book

Game information

First quarter

- DEN – Vaughn Hebron 1-yard run (kick failed), 6:22. Broncos 6–0. Drive: 6 plays, 50 yards, 2:58.
- DEN – Shannon Sharpe 18-yard pass from John Elway (pass failed), 0:33. Broncos 12–0. Drive: 7 plays, 64 yards, 3:52.

Second quarter

- JAX – Mike Hollis 46-yard field goal, 11:15. Broncos 12–3. Drive: 10 plays, 50 yards, 4:18.
- JAX – Natrone Means 8-yard run (Mike Hollis kick), 2:58. Broncos 12–10. Drive: 10 plays, 80 yards, 5:21.
- JAX – Mike Hollis 42-yard field goal, 0:10. Jaguars 13–12. Drive: 5 plays, 65 yards, 0:47.

Third quarter

- JAX – Keenan McCardell 31-yard pass from Mark Brunell (Mike Hollis kick), 8:51. Jaguars 20–12. Drive: 7 plays, 75 yards, 3:18.

Fourth quarter

- JAX – Mike Hollis 22-yard field goal, 10:51. Jaguars 23–12. Drive: 17 plays, 88 yards, 8:32.
- DEN – Terrell Davis 2-yard run (run succeeded), 7:37. Jaguars 23–20. Drive: 9 plays, 57 yards, 3:14.
- JAX – Jimmy Smith 16-yard pass from Mark Brunell (Mike Hollis kick), 3:39. Jaguars 30–20. Drive: 9 plays, 74 yards, 3:58.
- DEN – Ed McCaffrey 15-yard pass from John Elway (Jason Elam kick), 1:50. Jaguars 30–27. Drive: 8 plays, 80 yards, 1:49.

Top passers

- JAX – Mark Brunell – 18/29, 245 yards, 2 TD
- DEN – John Elway – 25/38, 226 yards, 2 TD

Top rushers

- JAX – Natrone Means – 21 rushes, 140 yards, TD
- DEN – Terrell Davis – 14 rushes, 91 yards, TD

Top receivers

- JAX – Jimmy Smith – 3 receptions, 71 yards, TD
- DEN – Ed McCaffrey – 5 receptions, 67 yards

Considered one of the greatest upsets in NFL playoff history, the Jaguars (who were 14 point underdogs, and initially fell behind 12–0 in the first quarter, but led 13–12 at halftime) would stun the Broncos 30–27. Earlier in the day, Denver Post sports columnist Woody Paige referred to the Jaguars as the “Jagwads”, stating throughout the article that the Jaguars weren't worthy to travel to Mile High Stadium and play the Broncos. The Broncos had indeed been dominant during the regular season, going 13–3. The Broncos opted to rest most of their starters for the better part of the final month of the season, as they had secured the number one seed in the AFC Playoffs relatively early on in the regular season. Conversely, the Jaguars had battled their way into a Wild Card spot; and coming off of their upset road victory in Buffalo, were only further motivated by the general lack of faith in their chances. Mark Brunell threw for 245 yards with no interceptions, and two touchdowns, including a diving effort on third down by wide receiver Jimmy Smith with 3:49 left in the fourth quarter to put Jacksonville up 30–20. It was Natrone Means, however that was the star of the game. He ran for 140 yards on 21 carries and a touchdown, and subsequently relieved the pressure on Brunell and the Jaguars passing game. The Broncos would struggle all game to contain Means, whose longest run of the day was 21 yards. With this win, the Jaguars would go to the AFC Championship Game in just the second year of their existence.

==== AFC Championship: vs (2) New England Patriots ====
AFC Championship: (5) Jacksonville Jaguars at (2) New England Patriots – Game summary

Quarter	1	2	3	4	Total
Jaguars	0	3	3	0	6
Patriots	7	6	0	7	20

at Foxboro Stadium, Foxboro, MA

- Date: January 12, 1997
- Game time: 4:00 p.m. EST
- Game weather: Sunny, 27 °F (−3 °C)
- Game attendance: 60,190
- Referee: Jerry Markbreit
- Recap, Game Book

Game information

First quarter

- NE – Curtis Martin 1-yard run (Adam Vinatieri kick), 12:34. Patriots 7–0. Drive: 2 plays, 4 yards, 0:35.

Second quarter

- JAX – Mike Hollis 32-yard field goal, 10:33. Patriots 7–3. Drive: 13 plays, 62 yards, 6:03.
- NE – Adam Vinatieri 29-yard field goal, 7:23. Patriots 10–3. Drive: 4 plays, 7 yards, 1:29.
- NE – Adam Vinatieri 20-yard field goal, 0:00. Patriots 13–3. Drive: 9 plays, 68 yards, 1:29.

Third quarter

- JAX – Mike Hollis 28-yard field goal, 2:37. Patriots 13–6. Drive: 9 plays, 27 yards, 5:39.

Fourth quarter

- NE – Otis Smith 47-yard fumble return (Adam Vinatieri kick), 2:24. Patriots 20–6.

Top passers

- JAX – Mark Brunell – 20/38, 190 yards, 2 INT
- NE – Drew Bledsoe – 20/33, 178 yards, INT

Top rushers

- JAX – Natrone Means – 19 rushes, 43 yards
- NE – Curtis Martin – 19 rushes, 59 yards, TD

Top receivers

- JAX – Pete Mitchell – 7 receptions, 63 yards
- NE – Shawn Jefferson – 4 receptions, 91 yards

== Awards and records ==
- Mark Brunell, franchise record, most passing yards in one game, 432 yards (Sept 22, 1996)
- Mark Brunell, franchise record, most passing yards in one season, 4,367 yards
- Mark Brunell, led NFL passing yards, 4,367 yards
- Mark Brunell, Pro Bowl MVP Award
- Mike Hollis, franchise record, most field goals in one game, 5 field goals (December 1, 1996)
- Keenan McCardell, franchise record, most receptions in one game, 16 receptions (Oct 20, 1996)

=== Milestones ===
- Keenan McCardell, 1,000 yard receiving season (1,129 yards)
- Jimmy Smith, 1,000 yard receiving season (1,244 yards)
