= 1995 Jacksonville Jaguars season =

Inaugural season for the franchise

- Owner: Wayne Weaver
- Head coach: Tom Coughlin
- Offensive coordinator: Kevin Gilbride
- Defensive coordinator: Dick Jauron
- Home stadium: Jacksonville Municipal Stadium

Results
- Record: 4–12
- Division place: 5th AFC Central
- Playoffs: Did not qualify
- Pro Bowlers: None

Uniform

The 1995 season was the Jacksonville Jaguars' 1st season in the National Football League (NFL) and their first season under the leadership of general manager and head coach Tom Coughlin. The Jaguars finished with a 4–12 record in their debut season and failed to qualify for the playoffs. However, they ended the season on a high note defeating the Cleveland Browns 24–21 on 24 December.

== Offseason ==
=== Expansion draft ===
1995 Jacksonville Jaguars expansion draft
Round	Selection	Player	Position	Drafted from
1	1	Steve Beuerlein^	QB	Arizona Cardinals
2	3	Corey Raymond	DB	New York Giants
3	5	Jeff Novak^	OT	Miami Dolphins
4	7	John Duff	DE	Los Angeles Raiders
5	9	Keith Goganious^	LB	Buffalo Bills
6	11	Mark Williams^	LB	Green Bay Packers
7	13	Al Jackson^	DB	Philadelphia Eagles
8	15	Mark Tucker^	C	Arizona Cardinals
9	17	Paul Frase^	DT	New York Jets
10	19	Tom Myslinski^	G	Chicago Bears
11	21	Willie Jackson^	WR	Dallas Cowboys
12	23	Othello Henderson	DB	New Orleans Saints
13	25	Santo Stephens^	LB	Cincinnati Bengals
14	27	Darren Carrington^	DB	San Diego Chargers
15	29	Mike Davis	DB	Houston Oilers
16	31	Dave Thomas^	DB	Dallas Cowboys
17	33	Mazio Royster	RB	Tampa Bay Buccaneers
18	35	Le'Shai Maston^	FB	Houston Oilers
19	37	Charles Davenport	WR	Pittsburgh Steelers
20	39	Monty Grow^	DB	Kansas City Chiefs
21	43	Marcus Wilson	RB	Green Bay Packers
22	45	Brant Boyer^	LB	Miami Dolphins
23	47	Harry Colon^	DB	Detroit Lions
24	49	Derek Brown^	TE	New York Giants
25	49	James Williams^	LB	New Orleans Saints
26	51	Eugene Chung^	G	New England Patriots
27	53	Reggie Cobb^	RB	Green Bay Packers
28	55	Desmond Howard^	WR	Washington Redskins
29	57	Kelvin Martin	WR	Seattle Seahawks
30	59	Cedric Tillman^	WR	Denver Broncos
31	61	Rogerick Green^	DB	Tampa Bay Buccaneers

^ Made roster.

=== NFL draft ===
1995 Jacksonville Jaguars draft
Round	Pick	Player	Position	College	Notes
1	2	Tony Boselli * ^{†}	Tackle	USC	
1	19	James Stewart	Running back	Tennessee	
2	40	Brian DeMarco	Tackle	Michigan State	
2	64	Bryan Schwartz	Linebacker	Augustana	
3	71	Chris Hudson	Safety	Colorado	
4	99	Rob Johnson	Quarterback	USC	
4	123	Mike Thompson	Defensive tackle	Wisconsin	
5	169	Ryan Christopherson	Running back	Wyoming	
6	172	Marcus Price	Tackle	LSU	
7	219	Curtis Marsh Sr.	Wide receiver	Utah	
Made roster † Pro Football Hall of Fame * Made at least one Pro Bowl during career

=== Undrafted free agents ===
Name	Position	College
Kendall Brown	Defensive end	Louisville
Tommy Johnson	Cornerback	Alabama
Gordon Laro	Tight end	Boston College
Rod Smalley	Linebacker	UCLA

== Staff ==
1995 Jacksonville Jaguars staff
Front office: Chairman/chief executive officer – Wayne Weaver; President/chief operating officer – David Seldin; Vice president of football operations – Michael Huyghue; Director of college scouting – Rick Reiprish; Director of pro personnel – Ron Hill; Assistant director of pro personnel – Fran Foley; College scout – Rick Mueller; College scout – Gene Smith; College scout – Doug Williams; Head coaches: Head coach/general manager – Tom Coughlin; Offensive coaches: Offensive coordinator – Kevin Gilbride; Running backs – Jerald Ingram; Wide receivers – Pete Carmichael; Tight ends – Nick Nicolau; Offensive line – Mike Maser	Defensive coaches: Defensive coordinator – Dick Jauron; Defensive line – John Pease; Linebackers – Steve Szabo; Outside linebackers – Lucious Selmon; Defensive backs/secondary – Randy Edsall; Special teams coaches: Special teams coordinator – Larry Pasquale; Assistant special teams – Joe Baker; Strength and conditioning: Strength and conditioning – Jerry Palmieri; Assistant strength and conditioning – Jeff Hurd

== Final roster ==
1995 Jacksonville Jaguars roster
Quarterbacks (QB): 7 Steve Beuerlein; 8 Mark Brunell; 11 Rob Johnson; Running backs (RB): 36 Ryan Christopherson; 44 Bryan Dickerson; 32 Vaughn Dunbar; 23 Randy Jordan; 35 Le'Shai Maston FB; 33 James Stewart; Wide receivers (WR): 81 Desmond Howard; 80 Willie Jackson KR; 89 Curtis Marsh KR; 82 Jimmy Smith KR; 87 Cedric Tillman; 84 Terrence Warren; Tight ends (TE): 85 Rich Griffith LS; 88 Craig Keith; 83 Pete Mitchell	Offensive linemen (OL): 71 Tony Boselli T; 66 Shawn Bouwens G; 69 Eugene Chung G; 62 Ben Coleman G; 73 Brian DeMarco T; 50 Tom Myslinski G; 67 Jeff Novak G/T; 79 Dave Widell; 68 Bruce Wilkerson T; Defensive linemen (DL): 92 Don Davey DE; 91 Paul Frase DE; 97 Ray Hall DT; 93 Ernie Logan DE; 98 Corey Mayfield DT; 65 Bronzell Miller DE; 94 Kelvin Pritchett DT; 99 Joel Smeenge DE; 95 Mike Thompson DT	Linebackers (LB): 52 Brant Boyer MLB; 96 Bernard Carter OLB; 54 Keith Goganious; 55 Tom McManus MLB; 58 Bryan Schwartz MLB; 53 Santo Stephens OLB; Defensive backs (DB): 27 Vinnie Clark CB; 24 Harry Colon S; 45 Travis Davis SS; 38 Mike Dumas FS; 26 Rogerick Green CB; 21 Tommy Johnson CB; 30 Darren Studstill FS; 41 Dave Thomas CB; 25 Mickey Washington CB; Special teams (ST): 4 Bryan Barker P; 1 Mike Hollis K	Practice squad: 57 Ryan McCoy LB; 72 Jason Simmons DE; 76 Rich Tylski G; Reserve: 86 Derek Brown TE (IR); 29 Darren Carrington S (IR); 59 Reggie Clark LB (IR); 96 John Duff DE (IR); 28 Monty Grow S (IR); 20 Chris Hudson S (IR); 47 Al Jackson CB (IR); 56 Jeff Lageman DE (IR); 75 Marcus Price G (IR); 51 Mark Williams LB (IR); Rookies in italics 53 active, 10 reserve, 3 practice squad

== Preseason ==
Week	Date	Opponent	Result	Record	Stadium	Attendance
1	July 29	Carolina Panthers	L 14–20	0–1	Fawcett Stadium	24,625
2	August 4	at Miami Dolphins	W 24–21	1–1	Joe Robbie Stadium	51,745
3	August 10	at Detroit Lions	L 3–19	1–2	Pontiac Silverdome	44,690
4	August 18	St. Louis Rams	L 10–27	1–3	Jacksonville Municipal Stadium	70,000
5	August 25	Denver Broncos	W 23–17	2–3	Jacksonville Municipal Stadium	66,023

== Regular season ==
=== Schedule ===
Week	Date	Opponent	Result	Record	Venue	Attendance
1	September 3	**Houston Oilers**	**L** 3–10	0–1	Jacksonville Municipal Stadium	72,363
2	September 10	at **Cincinnati Bengals**	**L** 17–24	0–2	Riverfront Stadium	48,318
3	September 17	at New York Jets	**L** 10–27	0–3	Giants Stadium	49,970
4	September 24	Green Bay Packers	**L** 14–24	0–4	Jacksonville Municipal Stadium	66,744
5	October 1	at **Houston Oilers**	**W** 17–16	1–4	Houston Astrodome	36,346
6	October 8	**Pittsburgh Steelers**	**W** 20–16	2–4	Jacksonville Municipal Stadium	72,042
7	October 15	Chicago Bears	**L** 27–30	2–5	Jacksonville Municipal Stadium	72,020
8	October 22	at **Cleveland Browns**	**W** 23–15	3–5	Cleveland Stadium	64,405
9	October 29	at **Pittsburgh Steelers**	**L** 7–24	3–6	Three Rivers Stadium	54,516
10	Bye					
11	November 12	Seattle Seahawks	**L** 30–47	3–7	Jacksonville Municipal Stadium	71,290
12	November 19	at Tampa Bay Buccaneers	**L** 16–17	3–8	Tampa Stadium	71,629
13	November 26	**Cincinnati Bengals**	**L** 13–17	3–9	Jacksonville Municipal Stadium	68,249
14	December 3	at Denver Broncos	**L** 23–31	3–10	Mile High Stadium	72,231
15	December 10	Indianapolis Colts	**L** 31–41	3–11	Jacksonville Municipal Stadium	66,099
16	December 17	at Detroit Lions	**L** 0–44	3–12	Pontiac Silverdome	70,204
17	December 24	**Cleveland Browns**	**W** 24–21	4–12	Jacksonville Municipal Stadium	66,007

Note: Intra-division opponents are in bold text.

=== Game summaries ===
==== Week 1: vs. Houston Oilers ====
Week One: Houston Oilers at Jacksonville Jaguars – Game summary

Quarter	1	2	3	4	Total
**Oilers**	7	0	3	0	**10**
Jaguars	0	0	0	3	**3**

at Jacksonville Municipal Stadium, Jacksonville, Florida

- Date: September 3, 1995
- Game time: 1:00 p.m. EST
- Game weather: Partly cloudy, 82 °F (28 °C)
- Game attendance: 72,363
- Referee: Johnny Grier
- TV announcers (NBC): Don Criqui and Beasley Reece
- Recap, Game Book

Game information

**First quarter**

- HOU – Haywood Jeffires 4-yard pass from Chris Chandler (Al Del Greco kick), 6:43. Oilers 7–0. **Drive: 13 plays, 78 yards, 8:17.**

**Second quarter**

- No scoring plays.

**Third quarter**

- HOU – Al Del Greco 19-yard field goal, 5:22. Oilers 10–0. **Drive: 9 plays, 59 yards, 4:41.**

**Fourth quarter**

- JAX – Mike Hollis 26-yard field goal, 11:58. Oilers 10–3. **Drive: 11 plays, 66 yards, 4:32.**

Top passers

- HOU – Chris Chandler – 9/14, 61 yards, TD
- JAX – Steve Beuerlein – 7/17, 54 yards

Top rushers

- HOU – Gary Brown – 29 rushes, 101 yards
- JAX – James Stewart – 10 rushes, 36 yards

Top receivers

- HOU – Derek Russell – 2 receptions, 24 yards
- JAX – Desmond Howard – 3 receptions, 33 yards

==== Week 2: at Cincinnati Bengals ====
Week Two: Jacksonville Jaguars at Cincinnati Bengals – Game summary

Quarter	1	2	3	4	Total
Jaguars	7	0	3	7	**17**
**Bengals**	3	7	7	7	**24**

at Riverfront Stadium, Cincinnati, Ohio

- Date: September 10, 1995
- Game time: 4:05 p.m. EST
- Game weather: Sunny, 75 °F (24 °C)
- Game attendance: 48,318
- TV announcers (NBC): Don Criqui and Beasley Reece
- Recap, Game Book

Game information

**First quarter**

- CIN – Doug Pelfrey 42-yard field goal, 9:51. Bengals 3–0. **Drive: 11 plays, 27 yards, 5:09.**
- JAX – Randy Jordan 71-yard pass from Steve Beuerlein (Mike Hollis kick), 8:43. Jaguars 7–3. **Drive: 3 plays, 77 yards, 1:08.**

**Second quarter**

- CIN – Melvin Tuten 3-yard pass from Jeff Blake (Doug Pelfrey kick), 0:16. Bengals 10–7. **Drive: 9 plays, 64 yards, 3:08.**

**Third quarter**

- JAX – Mike Hollis 29-yard field goal, 12:18. Tied 10–10. **Drive: 5 plays, -7 yards, 0:25.**
- CIN – Harold Green 10-yard run (Doug Pelfrey kick), 8:14. Bengals 17–10. **Drive: 9 plays, 71 yards, 4:04.**

**Fourth quarter**

- CIN – Carl Pickens 68-yard pass from Jeff Blake (Doug Pelfrey kick), 14:04. Bengals 24–10. **Drive: 2 plays, 70 yards, 0:48.**
- JAX – Mark Brunell 8-yard run (Mike Hollis kick), 7:20. Bengals 24–17. **Drive: 8 plays, 65 yards, 4:15.**

Top passers

- JAX – Steve Beuerlein – 4/12, 98 yards, TD
- CIN – Jeff Blake – 20/30, 247 yards, 2 TD

Top rushers

- JAX – Randy Jordan – 20 rushes, 64 yards
- CIN – Eric Bieniemy – 14 rushes, 65 yards

Top receivers

- JAX – Randy Jordan – 3 receptions, 80 yards, TD
- CIN – Carl Pickens – 5 receptions, 102 yards, TD

==== Week 3: at New York Jets ====
Week Three: Jacksonville Jaguars at New York Jets – Game summary

Quarter	1	2	3	4	Total
Jaguars	0	3	0	7	**10**
**Jets**	7	6	14	0	**27**

at Giants Stadium, East Rutherford, New Jersey

- Date: September 17, 1995
- Game time: 4:05 p.m. EST
- Game weather: Mostly cloudy, 72 °F (22 °C)
- Game attendance: 49,970
- Referee: Thomas White
- TV announcers (NBC): Don Criqui and Beasley Reece
- Recap, Game Book

Game information

**First quarter**

- NYJ – Wayne Chrebet 11-yard pass from Boomer Esiason (Nick Lowery kick), 10:03. Jets 7–0. **Drive: 9 plays, 60 yards, 4:57.**

**Second quarter**

- NYJ – Nick Lowery 20-yard field goal, 7:42. Jets 10–0. **Drive: 4 plays, 8 yards, 1:36.**
- JAX – Mike Hollis 34-yard field goal, 1:13. Jets 10–3. **Drive: 16 plays, 63 yards, 6:29.**
- NYJ – Nick Lowery 48-yard field goal, 0:05. Jets 13–3. **Drive: 11 plays, 53 yards, 1:08.**

**Third quarter**

- NYJ – Kyle Brady 20-yard pass from Boomer Esiason (Nick Lowery kick), 7:52. Jets 20–3. **Drive: 12 plays, 76 yards, 5:26.**
- NYJ – Charles Wilson 15-yard pass from Boomer Esiason (Nick Lowery kick), 2:56. Jets 27–3. **Drive: 5 plays, 50 yards, 2:37.**

**Fourth quarter**

- JAX – Ernest Givins 7-yard pass from Mark Brunell (Mike Hollis kick), 1:06. Jets 27–10. **Drive: 14 plays, 73 yards, 3:00.**

Top passers

- JAX – Mark Brunell – 15/33, 138 yards, TD, INT
- NYJ – Boomer Esiason – 27/43, 296 yards, 3 TD, INT

Top rushers

- JAX – James Stewart – 20 rushes, 54 yards
- NYJ – Brad Baxter – 18 rushes, 64 yards

Top receivers

- JAX – Cedric Tillman – 5 receptions, 51 yards
- NYJ – Fred Baxter – 6 receptions, 99 yards

==== Week 4: vs. Green Bay Packers ====
Week Four: Green Bay Packers at Jacksonville Jaguars – Game summary

Quarter	1	2	3	4	Total
**Packers**	0	10	7	7	**24**
Jaguars	0	0	0	14	**14**

at Jacksonville Municipal Stadium, Jacksonville, Florida

- Date: September 24, 1995
- Game time: 8:00 p.m. EST
- Game weather: Cloudy, 64 °F (18 °C)
- Game attendance: 66,744
- Referee: Gerry Austin
- TV announcers (TNT): Verne Lundquist, Pat Haden, Ernie Johnson
- Recap, Game Book

Game information

**First quarter**

- No scoring plays.

**Second quarter**

- GB – Craig Hentrich 49-yard field goal, 11:07. Packers 3–0. **Drive: 14 plays, 61 yards, 8:36.**
- GB – Robert Brooks 6-yard pass from Brett Favre (Craig Hentrich kick), 0:56. Packers 10–0. **Drive: 9 plays, 79 yards, 4:39.**

**Third quarter**

- GB – Dorsey Levens 2-yard run (Craig Hentrich kick), 4:38. Packers 17–0. **Drive: 8 plays, 62 yards, 3:45.**

**Fourth quarter**

- JAX – Willie Jackson 8-yard pass from Mark Brunell (Mike Hollis kick), 14:03. Packers 17–7. **Drive: 5 plays, 20 yards, 1:45.**
- GB – Anthony Morgan 29-yard pass from Brett Favre (Craig Hentrich kick), 5:52. Packers 24–7. **Drive: 3 plays, 29 yards, 1:05.**
- JAX – Willie Jackson 3-yard pass from Mark Brunell (Mike Hollis kick), 1:02. Packers 24–14. **Drive: 14 plays, 78 yards, 4:50.**

Top passers

- GB – Brett Favre – 20/30, 202 yards, 2 TD, INT
- JAX – Mark Brunell – 16/29, 156 yards, 2 TD

Top rushers

- GB – Edgar Bennett – 21 rushes, 66 yards
- JAX – James Stewart – 13 rushes, 38 yards

Top receivers

- GB – Anthony Morgan – 3 receptions, 51 yards, TD
- JAX – Willie Jackson – 7 receptions, 66 yards, 2 TD

==== Week 5: at Houston Oilers ====
Week Five: Jacksonville Jaguars at Houston Oilers – Game summary

Quarter	1	2	3	4	Total
**Jaguars**	10	0	0	7	**17**
Oilers	0	6	7	3	**16**

at Houston Astrodome, Houston, Texas

- Date: October 1, 1995
- Game time: 4:00 p.m. EST
- Game weather: None (domed stadium)
- Game attendance: 36,346
- Referee: Jerry Markbreit
- TV announcers (NBC): Jim Donovan, Bob Golic
- Recap, Game Book

Game information

**First quarter**

- JAX – Ryan Christopherson 1-yard run (Mike Hollis kick), 11:14 Jaguars 7–0. **Drive: 5 plays, 20 yards, 2:45.**
- JAX – Mike Hollis 22-yard field goal, 6:30. Jaguars 10–0. **Drive: 7 plays, 72 yards, 2:58.**

**Second quarter**

- HOU – Al Del Greco 29-yard field goal, 6:35. Jaguars 10–3. **Drive: 13 plays, 62 yards, 6:02.**
- HOU – Al Del Greco 53-yard field goal, 0:03. Jaguars 10–6. **Drive: 12 plays, 36 yards, 1:40.**

**Third quarter**

- HOU – Rodney Thomas 17-yard pass from Chris Chandler (Al Del Greco kick), 8:20. Oilers 13–10. **Drive: 9 plays, 57 yards, 4:16.**

**Fourth quarter**

- HOU – Al Del Greco 32-yard field goal, 14:11. Oilers 16–10. **Drive: 14 plays, 67 yards, 6:45.**
- JAX – Desmond Howard 15-yard pass from Mark Brunell (Mike Hollis kick), 1:03. Jaguars 17–16. **Drive: 5 plays, 45 yards, 1:14.**

Top passers

- JAX – Steve Beuerlein – 8/18, 117 yards, INT
- HOU – Chris Chandler – 27/47, 225 yards, TD, INT

Top rushers

- JAX – James Stewart – 11 rushes, 23 yards
- HOU – Rodney Thomas – 17 rushes, 59 yards

Top receivers

- JAX – Willie Jackson – 6 receptions, 48 yards
- HOU – Haywood Jeffires – 5 receptions, 66 yards

==== Week 6: vs. Pittsburgh Steelers ====
Week Six: Pittsburgh Steelers at Jacksonville Jaguars – Game summary

Quarter	1	2	3	4	Total
Steelers	0	7	6	3	**16**
**Jaguars**	7	10	3	0	**20**

at Jacksonville Municipal Stadium, Jacksonville, Florida

- Date: October 8, 1995
- Game time: 1:00 p.m. EST
- Game weather: Partly sunny, 82 °F (28 °C)
- Game attendance: 72,042
- Referee: Mike Carey
- TV announcers (NBC): Don Criqui and Beasley Reece
- Recap, Game Book

Game information

**First quarter**

- JAX – Cedric Tillman 10-yard pass from Mark Brunell (Mike Hollis kick), 10:18. Jaguars 7–0. **Drive: 7 plays, 79 yards, 4:42.**

**Second quarter**

- JAX – James Stewart 6-yard run (Mike Hollis kick), 14:02. Jaguars 14–0. **Drive: 5 plays, 31 yards, 1:52.**
- PIT – Steve Avery 18-yard pass from Neil O'Donnell (Norm Johnson kick), 1:58. Jaguars 14–7. **Drive: 8 plays, 88 yards, 3:39.**
- JAX – Mike Hollis 53-yard field goal, 0:32. Jaguars 17–7. **Drive: 7 plays, 39 yards, 3:39.**

**Third quarter**

- PIT – Norm Johnson 41-yard field goal, 12:57. Jaguars 17–10. **Drive: 5 plays, 24 yards, 2:03.**
- JAX – Mike Hollis 32-yard field goal, 6:03. Jaguars 20–10. **Drive: 12 plays, 66 yards, 6:54.**
- PIT – Norm Johnson 19-yard field goal, 3:15. Jaguars 20–13. **Drive: 6 plays, 68 yards, 2:48.**

**Fourth quarter**

- PIT – Norm Johnson 22-yard field goal, 14:52. Jaguars 20–16. **Drive: 6 plays, 48 yards, 1:58.**

Top passers

- PIT – Neil O'Donnell – 19/35, 282 yards, TD
- JAX – Mark Brunell – 17/30, 189 yards, TD

Top rushers

- PIT – Erric Pegram – 16 rushes, 56 yards
- JAX – James Stewart – 19 rushes, 44 yards, TD

Top receivers

- PIT – Yancey Thigpen – 6 receptions, 160 yards
- JAX – Willie Jackson – 6 receptions, 94 yards

==== Week 7: vs. Chicago Bears ====
Week Seven: Chicago Bears at Jacksonville Jaguars – Game summary

Quarter	1	2	3	4	Total
**Bears**	3	7	10	10	**30**
Jaguars	7	3	0	17	**27**

at Jacksonville Municipal Stadium, Jacksonville, Florida

- Date: October 15, 1995
- Game time: 1:00 p.m. EST
- Game weather: Clear, 68 °F (20 °C)
- Game attendance: 72,020
- Referee: Robert McElwee
- TV announcers (FOX): Kenny Albert, Anthony Muñoz
- Recap, Game Book

Game information

**First quarter**

- CHI – Kevin Butler 25-yard field goal, 5:20. Bears 3–0. **Drive: 12 plays, 56 yards, 4:32.**
- JAX – James Stewart 7-yard pass from Mark Brunell (Mike Hollis kick), 0:08. Jaguars 7–3. **Drive: 12 plays, 72 yards, 5:12.**

**Second quarter**

- JAX – Mike Hollis 49-yard field goal, 3:58. Jaguars 10–3. **Drive: 13 plays, 61 yards, 7:01.**
- CHI – Curtis Conway 10-yard pass from Erik Kramer (Kevin Butler kick), 1:15. Tied 10–10. **Drive: 7 plays, 63 yards, 2:43.**

**Third quarter**

- CHI – Curtis Conway 6-yard pass from Eric Kramer (Kevin Butler kick), 9:11. Bears 17–10. **Drive: 11 plays, 80 yards, 5:49.**
- CHI – Kevin Butler 21-yard field goal, 2:50. Bears 20–10. **Drive: 8 plays, 48 yards, 3:03.**

**Fourth quarter**

- JAX – Ernest Givins 12-yard pass from Mark Brunell (Mike Hollis kick), 14:22. Bears 20–17. **Drive: 8 plays, 80 yards, 3:28.**
- CHI – Curtis Conway 46-yard pass from Eric Kramer (Kevin Butler kick), 12:28. Bears 27–17. **Drive: 4 plays, 57 yards, 1:54.**
- JAX – Mike Hollis 40-yard field goal, 8:45. Bear 27–20. **Drive: 8 plays, 57 yards, 3:43.**
- CHI – Kevin Butler 20-yard field goal, 2:18. Bears 30–20. **Drive: 14 plays, 68 yards, 6:27.**
- JAX – Cedric Tillman 23-yard pass from Mark Brunell (Mike Hollis kick), 0:27. Bears 30–27. **Drive: 10 plays, 60 yards, 1:55.**

Top passers

- CHI – Erik Kramer – 17/29, 245 yards, 3 TD
- JAX – Mark Brunell – 30/48, 302 yards, 3 TD, INT

Top rushers

- CHI – Rashaan Salaam – 20 rushes, 79 yards
- JAX – James Stewart – 17 rushes, 97 yards

Top receivers

- CHI – Curtis Conway – 4 receptions, 74 yards, 3 TD
- JAX – Ernest Givins – 7 receptions, 73 yards, TD

==== Week 8: at Cleveland Browns ====
Week Eight: Jacksonville Jaguars at Cleveland Browns – Game summary

Quarter	1	2	3	4	Total
**Jaguars**	13	7	0	3	**23**
Browns	0	12	3	0	**15**

at Cleveland Municipal Stadium, Cleveland, Ohio

- Date: October 22, 1995
- Game time: 1:00 p.m. EST
- Game weather: Partly sunny, 46 °F (8 °C)
- Game attendance: 64,405
- Referee: Johnny Grier
- TV announcers (NBC): Jim Donovan, Tunch Ilkin
- Recap, Game Book

Game information

**First quarter**

- JAX – Cedric Tillman 6-yard pass from Mark Brunell (Mike Hollis kick), 3:42. Jaguars 7–0. **Drive: 15 plays, 80 yards, 9:16.**
- JAX – Mickey Washington 48-yard interception return (kick failed), 0:53. Jaguars 13–0.

**Second quarter**

- CLE – Matt Stover 36-yard field goal, 10:16. Jaguars 13–3. **Drive: 12 plays, 51 yards, 5:37.**
- CLE – Matt Stover 29-yard field goal, 4:52. Jaguars 13–6. **Drive: 8 plays, 36 yards, 4:18.**
- JAX – Vaughn Dunbar 1-yard run (Mike Hollis kick), 0:49. Jaguars 20–6. **Drive: 11 plays, 77 yards, 4:03.**
- CLE – Rico Smith 29-yard pass from Vinny Testaverde (pass failed), 0:07. Jaguars 20–12. **Drive: 3 plays, 51 yards, 0:42.**

**Third quarter**

- CLE – Matt Stover 21-yard field goal, 4:24. Jaguars 20–15. **Drive: 6 plays, 9 yards, 2:21.**

**Fourth quarter**

- JAX – Mike Hollis 31-yard field goal, 1:10. Jaguars 23–15. **Drive: 10 plays, 45 yards, 3:17.**

Top passers

- JAX – Mark Brunell – 16/28, 164 yards, TD, INT
- CLE – Vinny Testaverde – 20/34, 299 yards, TD, 2 INT

Top rushers

- JAX – Vaughn Dunbar – 26 rushes, 90 yards, TD
- CLE – Leroy Hoard – 19 rushes, 74 yards

Top receivers

- JAX – Cedric Tillman – 4 receptions, 61 yards, TD
- CLE – Rico Smith – 6 receptions, 106 yards, TD

==== Week 9: at Pittsburgh Steelers ====
Week Nine: Jacksonville Jaguars at Pittsburgh Steelers – Game summary

Quarter	1	2	3	4	Total
Jaguars	0	0	7	0	**7**
**Steelers**	7	14	0	3	**24**

at Three Rivers Stadium, Pittsburgh, Pennsylvania

- Date: October 29, 1995
- Game time: 1:00 p.m. EST
- Game weather: Cloudy, 51 °F (11 °C)
- Game attendance: 54,516
- Referee: Tom White
- TV announcers (NBC): Don Criqui, Beasley Reece
- Recap, Game Book

Game information

**First quarter**

- PIT – Erric Pegram 6-yard run (Norm Johnson kick), 4:17 Steelers 7–0. **Drive: 10 plays, 83 yards, 5:57.**

**Second quarter**

- PIT – Yancy Thigpen 15-yard pass from Neil O'Donnell (Norm Johnson kick), 13:49. Steelers 14–0. **Drive: 1 play, 15 yards, 0:07.**
- PIT – John L. Williams 6-yard pass from Neil O'Donnell (Norm Johnson kick), 1:55. Steelers 21–0. **Drive: 9 plays, 54 yards, 5:15.**

**Third quarter**

- JAX – Pete Mitchell 16-yard pass from Mark Brunell (Mike Hollis kick), 0:00. Steelers 21–7. **Drive: 10 plays, 69 yards, 5:15.**

**Fourth quarter**

- PIT – Norm Johnson 36-yard field goal, 12:32. Steelers 24–7. **Drive: 6 plays, 35 yards, 2:28.**

Top passers

- JAX – Mark Brunell – 18/33, 189 yards, TD
- PIT – Neil O'Donnell – 17/25, 178 yards, 2 TD

Top rushers

- JAX – Vaughn Dunbar – 10 rushes, 27 yards
- PIT – Erric Pegram – 19 rushes, 84 yards, TD

Top receivers

- JAX – Jimmy Smith – 4 receptions, 54 yards
- CLE – Yancey Thigpen – 5 receptions, 87 yards, TD

==== Week 11: vs. Seattle Seahawks ====
Week Eleven: Seattle Seahawks at Jacksonville Jaguars – Game summary

Quarter	1	2	3	4	Total
**Seahawks**	14	7	7	19	**47**
Jaguars	7	20	0	3	**30**

at Jacksonville Municipal Stadium, Jacksonville, Florida

- Date: November 12, 1995
- Game time: 1:00 p.m. EST
- Game weather: Sunny, 52 °F (11 °C)
- Game attendance: 71,290
- Referee: Walt Coleman
- TV announcers (NBC): Don Criqui, Beasley Reece
- Recap, Game Book

Game information

**First quarter**

- SEA – Chris Warren 29-yard run (Todd Peterson kick), 10:11 Seahawks 7–0. **Drive: 9 plays, 78 yards, 4:49.**
- JAX – Mark Brunell 3-yard run (Mike Hollis kick), 6:30 Tied 7–7. **Drive: 6 plays, 65 yards, 3:41.**
- SEA – Joey Galloway 38-yard pass from Rick Mirer (Todd Peterson kick), 0:00. Seahawks 14–7. **Drive: 7 plays, 68 yards, 3:39.**

**Second quarter**

- JAX – Vaughn Dunbar 2-yard run (Mike Hollis kick), 12:13 Tied 14–14. **Drive: 5 plays, 59 yards, 2:47.**
- SEA – Joey Galloway 86-yard run (Todd Peterson kick), 10:56 Seahawks 21–14. **Drive: 3 plays, 89 yards, 1:17.**
- JAX – Ernest Givins 15-yard pass from Mark Brunell (Mike Hollis kick), 7:02. Tied 21–21. **Drive: 8 plays, 73 yards, 3:54.**
- JAX – Mike Hollis 26-yard field goal, 1:22. Jaguars 24–21. **Drive: 11 plays, 52 yards, 4:27.**
- JAX – Mike Hollis 50-yard field goal, 0:00. Jaguars 27–21. **Drive: 2 plays, 2 yards, 0:06.**

**Third quarter**

- SEA – Joey Galloway 23-yard pass from Rick Mirer (Todd Peterson kick), 10:57. Seahawks 28–27. **Drive: 5 plays, 48 yards, 2:34.**

**Fourth quarter**

- SEA – Mack Strong 4-yard run (Todd Peterson kick), 13:47. Seahawks 35–27. **Drive: 8 plays, 56 yards, 3:12.**
- JAX – Mike Hollis 29-yard field goal, 10:37. Seahawks 35–30. **Drive: 6 plays, 54 yards, 3:10.**
- SEA – Todd Peterson 25-yard field goal, 4:18. Seahawks 38–30. **Drive: 11 plays, 63 yards, 6:19.**
- SEA – Tracy Johnson 2-yard run (Todd Peterson kick), 1:03 Seahawks 45–30. **Drive: 7 plays, 30 yards, 2:48.**
- SEA – Mark Brunell sacked in the end zone for safety, 0:50. Seahawks 47–30.

Top passers

- SEA – Rick Mirer – 18/31, 244 yards, 2 TD, INT
- JAX – Mark Brunell – 13/20, 121 yards, TD, INT

Top rushers

- SEA – Chris Warren – 27 rushes, 121 yards, TD
- JAX – Vaughn Dunbar – 15 rushes, 53 yards, TD

Top receivers

- SEA – Joey Galloway – 5 receptions, 114 yards, 2 TD
- JAX – Ernest Givins – 5 receptions, 46 yards, TD

==== Week 12: at Tampa Bay Buccaneers ====
Week Twelve: Jacksonville Jaguars at Tampa Bay Buccaneers – Game summary

Quarter	1	2	3	4	Total
Jaguars	0	0	3	13	**16**
**Buccaneers**	3	7	0	7	**17**

at Tampa Stadium, Tampa, Florida

- Date: November 19, 1995
- Game time: 1:00 p.m. EST
- Game weather: 75 °F (24 °C)
- Game attendance: 71,629
- Referee: Gordon McCarter
- TV announcers (NBC): Dan Hicks, Bob Golic
- Recap, Game Book

Game information

**First quarter**

- TB – Michael Husted 33-yard field goal, 1:17. Buccaneers 3–0. **Drive: 14 plays, 78 yards, 8:01.**

**Second quarter**

- TB – Errict Rhett 1-yard run (Michael Husted kick), 0:18 Buccaneers 10–0. **Drive: 5 plays, 48 yards, 1:05.**

**Third quarter**

- JAX – Mike Hollis 22-yard field goal, 7:28. Buccaneers 10–3. **Drive: 11 plays, 76 yards, 6:23.**

**Fourth quarter**

- JAX – Mark Brunell 9-yard run (Mike Hollis kick), 14:52 Tied 10–10. **Drive: 9 plays, 69 yards, 5:23.**
- TB – Errict Rhett 6-yard run (Michael Husted kick), 8:11 Buccaneers 17–10. **Drive: 11 plays, 62 yards, 6:41.**
- JAX – Pete Mitchell 12-yard pass from Steve Beuerlein (pass failed), 0:37. Buccaneers 17–16. **Drive: 11 plays, 96 yards, 3:20.**

Top passers

- JAX – Mark Brunell – 15/21, 169 yards
- TB – Trent Dilfer – 9/20, 103 yards

Top rushers

- JAX – James Stewart – 6 rushes, 36 yards
- TB – Errict Rhett – 24 rushes, 100 yards, 2 TD

Top receivers

- JAX – Pete Mitchell – 10 receptions, 161 yards, TD
- TB – Alvin Harper – 4 receptions, 58 yards

==== Week 13: vs. Cincinnati Bengals ====
Week Thirteen: Cincinnati Bengals at Jacksonville Jaguars – Game summary

Quarter	1	2	3	4	Total
**Bengals**	0	7	0	10	**17**
Jaguars	0	7	3	3	**13**

at Jacksonville Municipal Stadium, Jacksonville, Florida

- Date: November 26, 1995
- Game time: 1:00 p.m. EST
- Game weather: Clear and sunny, 60 °F (16 °C)
- Game attendance: 68,249
- Referee: Larry Nemmers
- TV announcers (NBC): Dan Hicks, Tunch Ilkin
- Recap, Game Book

Game information

**First quarter**

- No scoring plays.

**Second quarter**

- CIN – Jeff Blake 8-yard run (Doug Pelfrey kick), 10:58 Bengals 7–0. **Drive: 8 plays, 54 yards, 3:49.**
- JAX – Jimmy Smith 31-yard pass from Steve Beuerlein (Mike Hollis kick), 9:19. Tied 7–7. **Drive: 3 plays, 69 yards, 1:39.**

**Third quarter**

- JAX – Mike Hollis 36-yard field goal, 4:25. Jaguars 13–10. **Drive: 8 plays, 33 yards, 3:41.**

**Fourth quarter**

- CIN – Doug Pelfrey 31-yard field goal, 11:27. Tied 13–13. **Drive: 10 plays, 57 yards, 4:12.**
- JAX – Mike Hollis 39-yard field goal, 3:19. Jaguarss 16–13. **Drive: 14 plays, 55 yards, 8:08.**
- CIN – Carl Pickens 5-yard pass from Jeff Blake (Doug Pelfrey kick), 0:17. Bengals 17–16. **Drive: 13 plays, 88 yards, 3:02.**

Top passers

- CIN – Jeff Blake – 19/39, 210 yards, TD, 3 INT
- JAX – Steve Beuerlein – 18/34, 245 yards, TD, INT

Top rushers

- CIN – Harold Green – 17 rushes, 55 yards
- JAX – Vaughn Dunbar – 12 rushes, 37 yards

Top receivers

- CIN – Tony McGee – 4 receptions, 78 yards
- JAX – Pete Mitchell – 5 receptions, 69 yards

==== Week 14: at Denver Broncos ====
Week Fourteen: Jacksonville Jaguars at Denver Broncos – Game summary

Quarter	1	2	3	4	Total
Jaguars	3	7	6	7	**23**
**Broncos**	7	14	7	3	**31**

at Mile High Stadium, Denver, Colorado

- Date: December 3, 1995
- Game time: 4:00 p.m. EST
- Game weather: Mostly sunny, 51 °F (11 °C)
- Game attendance: 72,231
- Referee: Bernie Kukar
- TV announcers (NBC): Charlie Jones, Randy Cross
- Recap, Game Book

Game information

**First quarter**

- JAX – Mike Hollis 47-yard field goal, 6:35. Jaguars 3–0. **Drive: 10 plays, 65 yards, 5:00.**
- DEN – Anthony Miller 62-yard pass from John Elway (Jason Elam kick), 5:40. Broncos 7–3. **Drive: 2 plays, 59 yards, 0:55.**

**Second quarter**

- DEN – Shannon Sharpe 6-yard pass from John Elway (Jason Elam kick), 14:18. Broncos 14–3. **Drive: 10 plays, 69 yards, 4:52.**
- DEN – Jerry Evans 5-yard pass from John Elway (Jason Elam kick), 4:19. Broncos 21–3. **Drive: 2 plays, 7 yards, 0:27.**
- JAX – Blocked punt recovered in the end zone by Jimmy Smith (Mike Hollis kick), 0:08. Broncos 21–10.

**Third quarter**

- DEN – Mike Pritchard 45-yard pass from John Elway (Jason Elam kick), 0:14. Broncos 28–10. **Drive: 9 plays, 80 yards, 4:25.**
- JAX – Jimmy Smith 94-yard kickoff return (pass failed), 0:00. Broncos 28–16.

**Fourth quarter**

- DEN – Jason Elam 38-yard field goal, 10:41. Broncos 31–16. **Drive: 10 plays, 45 yards, 4:19.**
- JAX – Jimmy Smith 14-yard pass from Steve Beuerlein (Mike Hollis kick), 6:31. Broncos 31–23. **Drive: 7 plays, 76 yards, 4:10.**

Top passers

- JAX – Steve Beuerlein – 15/28, 198 yards, TD, INT
- DEN – John Elway – 22/34, 286 yards, 4 TD, INT

Top rushers

- JAX – James Stewart – 7 rushes, 39 yards
- DEN – Terrell Davis – 21 rushes, 84 yards

Top receivers

- JAX – Cedric Tillman – 4 receptions, 55 yards
- DEN – Anthony Miller – 3 receptions, 91 yards, TD

==== Week 15: vs. Indianapolis Colts ====
Week Fifteen: Indianapolis Colts at Jacksonville Jaguars – Game summary

Quarter	1	2	3	4	Total
**Colts**	14	10	3	14	**41**
Jaguars	0	7	3	21	**31**

at Jacksonville Municipal Stadium, Jacksonville, Florida

- Date: December 10, 1995
- Game time: 1:00 p.m. EST
- Game weather: Clear, 46 °F (8 °C)
- Game attendance: 66,099
- Referee: Mike Carey
- TV announcers (NBC): Jim Donovan, and John Dockery
- Recap, Game Book

Game information

**First quarter**

- IND – Aaron Bailey 95-yard kickoff return (Cary Blanchard kick), 14:45. Colts 7–0.
- IND – Aaron Bailey 14-yard pass from Craig Erickson (Cary Blanchard kick), 3:38. Colts 14–0. **Drive: 13 plays, 80 yards, 7:29.**

**Second quarter**

- JAX – James Stewart 6-yard run (Mike Hollis kick), 12:54. Colts 14–7. **Drive: 9 plays, 74 yards, 5:44.**
- IND – Marshall Faulk 1-yard run (Cary Blanchard kick), 5:44. Colts 21–7. **Drive: 3 plays, 2 yards, 1:24.**
- IND – Cary Blanchard 22-yard field goal, 2:50. Colts 24–7. **Drive: 4 plays, -2 yards, 1:31.**

**Third quarter**

- JAX – Mike Hollis 37-yard field goal, 8:29. Colts 24–10. **Drive: 13 plays, 49 yards, 6:31.**
- IND – Cary Blanchard 44-yard field goal, 3:23. Colts 27–10. **Drive: 9 plays, 39 yards, 5:06.**

**Fourth quarter**

- JAX – Willie Jackson 15-yard pass from Mark Brunell (Mike Hollis kick), 12:17. Colts 27–17. **Drive: 11 plays, 73 yards, 6:06.**
- IND – Ken Dilger 16-yard pass from Craig Erickson (Cary Blanchard kick), 8:04. Colts 34–17. **Drive: 7 plays, 44 yards, 4:13.**
- JAX – Jimmy Smith 4-yard pass from Mark Brunell (Mike Hollis kick), 6:24. Colts 34–24. **Drive: 3 plays, 62 yards, 1:40.**
- IND – Lamont Warren 2-yard run (Cary Blanchard kick), 3:13. Colts 41–24. **Drive: 6 plays, 38 yards, 3:35.**
- JAX – Willie Jackson 7-yard pass from Mark Brunell (Mike Hollis kick), 1:05. Colts 41–31. **Drive: 9 plays, 76 yards, 1:44.**

Top passers

- IND – Craig Erickson – 9/16, 129 yards, 2 TD
- JAX – Mark Brunell – 26/39, 312 yards, 3 TD, INT

Top rushers

- IND – Marshall Faulk – 22 rushes, 54 yards, TD
- JAX – James Stewart – 19 rushes, 92 yards, TD

Top receivers

- IND – Ken Dilger – 2 receptions, 42 yards, TD
- JAX – Willie Jackson – 6 receptions, 113 yards, 2 TD

On the opening kickoff, Colts return specialist Aaron Bailey, found a gap and sprinted 95 yards for a touchdown. The Jaguars countered by moving the ball to the Colts' 9–yard line; however, Mike Hollis' 27–yard field goal attempt was blocked. In response, the Colts scored another touchdown, with Bailey catching a 14–yard pass. A 45–yard completion to wide receiver Willie Jackson contributed to a Jaguars touchdown, cutting the Colts lead to 7 early in the second quarter. After a Colts punt, Cedric Tillman fumbled the ball during the return, with the Colts' Derwin Gray recovering the ball, which set up another Colts touchdown. On the following drive, Jaguars' quarterback Mark Brunell was intercepted by cornerback Eugene Daniel, who returned it to Jacksonville's 3–yard line. Nevertheless, the Colts were unable to score a touchdown and opted for a field goal, concluding the first half with the Colts leading 24–7. The Jaguars commenced the second half with a successful field goal drive, which the Colts promptly matched with a field goal of their own. As the fourth quarter began, the Jaguars executed a touchdown drive, reducing the Colts lead to 10. They attempted an onside kick, but the Colts recovered, leading to a subsequent touchdown for the Colts. In response, the Jaguars quickly scored a touchdown in just four plays, highlighted by a 31–yard pass to Jackson. The Jaguars attempted another onside kick, but the Colts recovered once more and added another touchdown to their tally. In the closing minutes, the Jaguars mounted a drive where Brunell connected with Jackson for another touchdown. They made a third attempt at an onside kick, but the Colts again recovered, ultimately securing a 41–31 victory in their inaugural matchup.

==== Week 16: at Detroit Lions ====
Week Sixteen: Jacksonville Jaguars at Detroit Lions – Game summary

Quarter	1	2	3	4	Total
Jaguars	0	0	0	0	**0**
**Lions**	10	17	10	7	**44**

at Pontiac Silverdome, Pontiac, Michigan

- Date: December 17, 1995
- Game time: 1:00 p.m. EST
- Game weather: None (played indoors)
- Game attendance: 70,204
- Referee: Howard Roe
- TV announcers (NBC): Jim Donovan and Tunch Ilkin
- Recap, Game Book

Game information

**First quarter**

- DET – Jason Hanson 38-yard field goal, 9:28. Lions 3–0. **Drive: 10 plays, 43 yards, 4:26.**
- DET – Johnnie Morton 23-yard pass from Scott Mitchell (Jason Hanson kick), 5:24. Lions 10–0. **Drive: 4 plays, 58 yards, 2:08.**

**Second quarter**

- DET – Barry Sanders 4-yard run (Jason Hanson kick), 12:49. Lions 17–0. **Drive: 5 plays, 80 yards, 2:30.**
- DET – Jason Hanson 39-yard field goal, 8:13. Lions 20–0. **Drive: 8 plays, 19 yards, 3:10.**
- DET – Barry Sanders 2-yard run (Jason Hanson kick), 0:40. Lions 27–0. **Drive: 2 plays, 1 yard, 0:40.**

**Third quarter**

- DET – Jason Hanson 33-yard field goal, 9:39. Lions 30–0. **Drive: 13 plays, 54 yards, 5:21.**
- DET – Johnnie Morton 17-yard pass from Scott Mitchell (Jason Hanson kick), 4:11. Lions 37–0. **Drive: 8 plays, 75 yards, 4:29.**

**Fourth quarter**

- DET – Ron Rivers 2-yard run (Jason Hanson kick), 10:52. Lions 44–0. **Drive: 8 plays, 60 yards, 4:04.**

Top passers

- JAX – Steve Beuerlein – 10/21, 136 yards, 3 INT
- DET – Scott Mitchell – 19/28, 233 yards, 2 TD

Top rushers

- JAX – Vaughn Dunbar – 9 rushes, 71 yards
- DET – Barry Sanders – 22 rushes, 76 yards, 2 TD

Top receivers

- JAX – Pete Mitchell – 3 receptions, 42 yards
- DET – Johnnie Morton – 4 receptions, 80 yards, 2 TD

==== Week 17: vs. Cleveland Browns ====
Week Seventeen: Cleveland Browns at Jacksonville Jaguars – Game summary

Quarter	1	2	3	4	Total
Browns	0	7	7	7	**21**
**Jaguars**	10	3	0	11	**24**

at Jacksonville Municipal Stadium, Jacksonville, Florida

- Date: December 24, 1995
- Game time: 1:00 p.m. EST
- Game weather: Clear, 42 °F (6 °C)
- Game attendance: 66,007
- Referee: Red Cashion
- TV announcers (NBC): Don Criqui, Beasley Reece
- Recap, Game Book

Game information

**First quarter**

- JAX – Mike Hollis 42-yard field goal, 11:18. Jaguars 3–0. **Drive: 8 plays, 55 yards, 3:42.**
- JAX – Willie Jackson 33-yard pass from Mark Brunell (Mike Hollis kick), 4:05. Jaguars 10–0. **Drive: 10 plays, 80 yards, 5:03.**

**Second quarter**

- CLE – Willie Jackson 39-yard pass from Vinny Testaverde (Matt Stover kick), 14:49. Jaguars 10–7. **Drive: 10 plays, 85 yards, 4:16.**
- JAX – Mike Hollis 21-yard field goal, 3:38. Jaguars 13–7. **Drive: 8 plays, 68 yards, 4:03.**

**Third quarter**

- CLE – Lorenzo White 3-yard run (Matt Stover kick), 7:32 Browns 14–13. **Drive: 15 plays, 91 yards, 7:28.**

**Fourth quarter**

- JAC – Mark Brunell 27-yard run (pass succeeded), 7:28 Jaguars 21–14. **Drive: 4 plays, 30 yards, 2:03.**
- CLE – Vinny Testaverde 1-yard run (Matt Stover kick), 1:13 Tied 21–21. **Drive: 7 plays, 79 yards, 1:48.**
- JAX – Mike Hollis 34-yard field goal, 0:00. Jaguars 24–21. **Drive: 5 plays, 63 yards, 1:13.**

Top passers

- CLE – Vinny Testaverde – 28/45, 325 yards, TD, 3 INT
- JAX – Mark Brunell – 17/29, 275 yards, TD

Top rushers

- CLE – Earnest Byner – 13 rushes, 52 yards
- JAX – Mark Brunell – 5 rushes, 51 yards, TD

Top receivers

- CLE – Michael Jackson – 7 receptions, 130 yards, TD
- JAX – Willie Jackson – 4 receptions, 81 yards, TD

=== Standings ===
AFC Central
	W	L	T	PCT	PF	PA	STK
^{(2)} Pittsburgh Steelers	11	5	0	.688	407	327	L1
Cincinnati Bengals	7	9	0	.438	349	374	W1
Houston Oilers	7	9	0	.438	348	324	W2
Cleveland Browns	5	11	0	.313	289	356	L1
Jacksonville Jaguars	4	12	0	.250	275	404	W1
