= Ray Hall (American football) =

American football player (born 1971)

No. 97
- Position: Defensive tackle

Personal information
- Born: March 2, 1971 (age 55); Seattle, Washington, U.S.
- Listed height: 6 ft 4 in (1.93 m)
- Listed weight: 294 lb (133 kg)

Career information
- High school: O'Dea (Seattle, Washington)
- College: Washington State
- NFL draft: 1994: undrafted

Career history
- Philadelphia Eagles (1994)*; Jacksonville Jaguars (1995)
- * Offseason or practice squad member only

Career NFL statistics
- Games played: 12
- Stats at Pro Football Reference

Hayward Ray Hall (born March 2, 1971) is an American former professional football player who was a defensive tackle in the National Football League (NFL). Hall played college football for the Washington State Cougars, and was a member of the Jacksonville Jaguars inaugural season roster in 1995. During the season, he appeared in 12 games for the Jaguars, but recorded no statistics.

Starred in football and basketball at Seattle's O’Dea High School and was inducted into the school's athletics Wall of Honor in 2008. Hall accepted a football scholarship at Washington State University where he helped guide the Cougars to a 1992 Cooper Bowl win and earned 1993 All-Pac-10 honors under WSU defensive coordinator Mike Zimmer.
