= Cedric Tillman (American football, born July 1970) =

American football player (born 1970)

No. 87
- Position: Wide receiver

Personal information
- Born: July 22, 1970 (age 56); Natchez, Mississippi, U.S.
- Listed height: 6 ft 2 in (1.88 m)
- Listed weight: 219 lb (99 kg)

Career information
- High school: Gulfport (Gulfport, Mississippi)
- College: Alcorn State
- NFL draft: 1992: 11th round, 305th overall pick
- Expansion draft: 1995: 30th round, 59th overall pick

Career history
- Denver Broncos (1992–1994); Jacksonville Jaguars (1995); Minnesota Vikings (1996)*; Las Vegas Outlaws (2001)
- * Offseason or practice squad member only

Career NFL statistics
- Receptions: 87
- Receiving yards: 1,227
- Touchdowns: 7
- Stats at Pro Football Reference

Cedric Cornell Tillman (born July 22, 1970) is an American former professional football player who played wide receiver for four seasons for the Denver Broncos and Jacksonville Jaguars. He was drafted by the Broncos in the 11th round of the 1992 NFL draft with the 305th overall pick.

Pre-draft measurables
Height	Weight	Arm length	Hand span	40-yard dash	10-yard split	20-yard split	20-yard shuttle	Vertical jump
6 ft 1 3/4 in (1.87 m)	207 lb (94 kg)	32 5/8 in (0.83 m)	10 3/4 in (0.27 m)	4.81 s	1.66 s	2.76 s	4.40 s	31.5 in (0.80 m)
All values from NFL Combine

== Personal life ==
Tillman has two sons, Jamir, who played wide receiver at Navy, and Cedric, who plays wide receiver for the New Orleans Saints.
