= Ryan Christopherson =

American football player (born 1972)

No. 36
- Position: Running back

Personal information
- Born: July 26, 1972 (age 54); Sioux Falls, South Dakota, U.S.
- Listed height: 5 ft 11 in (1.80 m)
- Listed weight: 237 lb (108 kg)

Career information
- High school: Cactus (Glendale, Arizona)
- College: Wyoming
- NFL draft: 1995: 5th round, 169th overall pick

Career history
- Jacksonville Jaguars (1995–1996); Arizona Cardinals (1996); Denver Broncos (1998–1999)*
- * Offseason or practice squad member only

Awards and highlights
- Second-team All-WAC (1993)

Career NFL statistics
- Rushing yards: 16
- Average: 1
- Touchdowns: 1
- Stats at Pro Football Reference

Ryan Ray Christopherson (born July 26, 1972) is an American former professional football player who was a running back in the National Football League (NFL) for the Jacksonville Jaguars and Arizona Cardinals. He played college football for the Wyoming Cowboys and was selected in the fifth round of the 1995 NFL draft.

== College career ==
Christopherson finished his Wyoming career as the school's all-time rushing leader with 2,906 yards. He also is the single-season rushing leader with 1,455 yards, which he gained as a senior in 1994. He was elected to the school's athletic Hall of Fame in 2006.

== Professional career ==
In the 1995 NFL draft, the Jacksonville Jaguars picked Christopherson in the fifth round as the 169th overall pick.
