= John Pease (American football) =

American football player and coach (1943–2021)

Biographical details
- Born: October 14, 1943; Pittsburgh, Pennsylvania, U.S.
- Died: August 16, 2021 (aged 77); Salt Lake City, Utah, U.S.

Playing career
- 1961–1962: Fullerton
- 1963–1964: Utah
- Positions: Running back, linebacker

Coaching career (HC unless noted)
- 1968–1969: Utah (GA)
- 1970–1974: Fullerton (DC/LB)
- 1974–1976: Long Beach State (LB)
- 1977: Utah (LB)
- 1978–1982: Washington (DL)
- 1983–1985: Philadelphia/Baltimore Stars (DL)
- 1986–1994: New Orleans Saints (DL)
- 1995–2000: Jacksonville Jaguars (DL)
- 2001–2002: Jacksonville Jaguars (DC)
- 2004–2005: New Orleans Saints (DL)
- 2009–2010: Utah (AHC/DL)
- 2015: Utah (DC/DL)

John Pease (October 14, 1943 – August 16, 2021) was an American football coach who held various positions in the pro and college ranks. Pease had his last coaching position at the University of Utah, where he was the defensive coordinator during the 2015 season. He was the defensive coordinator for the Jacksonville Jaguars in 2002. Prior to his promotion with the Jaguars, he served as their defensive line coach from the team's inception in 1995 through 2002. He served two stints with the New Orleans Saints as their defensive line coach, from 1986 to 1994 and 2004 to 2005. He served as the assistant head coach for Utah from 2009 to 2010. Pease retired once again in 2015 after spending one season as Utah's defensive coordinator. He died at the age of 77 in 2021.
