= Kendricke Bullard =

American football player (born 1972)

No. 88
- Position: Wide receiver

Personal information
- Born: April 30, 1972 (age 54); San Diego, California, U.S.
- Listed height: 6 ft 1 in (1.85 m)
- Listed weight: 183 lb (83 kg)

Career information
- High school: Pine Bluff (AR) Dollarway
- College: Arkansas State
- NFL draft: 1993: undrafted

Career history
- New England Patriots (1995)*; Buffalo Bills (1995)*; Dallas Cowboys (1995-1996)*; Jacksonville Jaguars (1996)
- * Offseason or practice squad member only
- Stats at Pro Football Reference

Kendricke Bullard (born April 30, 1972) is an American former professional football player who was a wide receiver for the Jacksonville Jaguars of the National Football League (NFL) in 1996. He played college football for the Arkansas State Red Wolves.
