= Andre Davis (defensive tackle) =

American football player (born 1975)

No. 77
- Position: Defensive tackle

Personal information
- Born: October 7, 1975 (age 51); Baton Rouge, Louisiana, U.S.
- Listed height: 6 ft 3 in (1.91 m)
- Listed weight: 330 lb (150 kg)

Career information
- High school: Baker (Baker, Louisiana)
- College: Southern (1992–1995)
- NFL draft: 1996: undrafted

Career history
- St. Louis Rams (1996)*; Jacksonville Jaguars (1996)
- * Offseason or practice squad member only
- Stats at Pro Football Reference

Andre Davis (born October 7, 1975) is an American former professional football player who was a defensive tackle for one season with the Jacksonville Jaguars of the National Football League (NFL). He played college football for the Southern Jaguars. He was also a member of the St. Louis Rams.

== Early life and college ==
Andre Davis was born on October 7, 1975, in Baton Rouge, Louisiana. He attended Baker High School in Baker, Louisiana.

He was a member of the Southern Jaguars football team from 1992 to 1995.

== Professional career ==
Davis signed with the St. Louis Rams on July 25, 1996. He was released on August 20, 1996.

Davis was signed to the practice squad of the Jacksonville Jaguars on August 27, 1996. He was promoted to the active roster on November 12 and played in two games for the Jaguars during the 1996 season before being placed on injured reserve on November 26, 1996. He was released on July 15, 1997.
