= Brian DeMarco =

American football player (born 1972)

No. 73
- Positions: Guard, tackle

Personal information
- Born: April 9, 1972 (age 54); Berea, Ohio, U.S.
- Listed height: 6 ft 7 in (2.01 m)
- Listed weight: 323 lb (147 kg)

Career information
- High school: Lorain Admiral King (Lorain, Ohio)
- College: Michigan State
- NFL draft: 1995: 2nd round, 40th overall pick

Career history
- Jacksonville Jaguars (1995–1998); Cincinnati Bengals (1999)

Awards and highlights
- Second-team All-Big Ten (1994)

Career NFL statistics
- Games played: 63
- Games started: 46
- Stats at Pro Football Reference

Brian DeMarco (born April 9, 1972) is an American former professional football player who was an offensive lineman in the National Football League (NFL). He played college football for the Michigan State Spartans and was selected in the second round of the 1995 NFL draft by the Jacksonville Jaguars.

== Professional career ==
After being drafted by the Jaguars, he was a starter for their inaugural season. Demarco played four seasons for the Jaguars. He signed a 3-year deal with the Cincinnati Bengals in 1999, but he retired after that season due to injuries.

== Post NFL ==
Demarco's suffering from injuries sustained while playing, and efforts to get accountability from the NFL and National Football League Players Association, have been highlighted as an example of the physical struggles of retired NFL players and their difficulty in receiving sufficient support. His post-NFL plight was featured in a Men's Journal article entitled "Casualties of the NFL." The article detailed devastating spinal damage DeMarco received while playing in the NFL, and continued playing with for sometime after. DeMarco took painkillers to mask the pain so he could continue playing, causing further damage to his body. The piece received widespread praise from advocates who sought medical and financial help for disabled NFL retirees.
