= Darren Studstill =

American football player (born 1970)

No. 30, 27
- Position: Safety

Personal information
- Born: August 9, 1970 (age 56); Palm Beach Gardens, Florida, U.S.
- Listed height: 6 ft 1 in (1.85 m)
- Listed weight: 186 lb (84 kg)

Career information
- High school: Palm Beach Gardens
- College: West Virginia
- NFL draft: 1994: 6th round, 191st overall pick

Career history
- Dallas Cowboys (1994); New York Jets (1995)*; Jacksonville Jaguars (1995–1996); → London Monarchs (1996)
- * Offseason or practice squad member only

Career NFL statistics
- Tackles: 1
- Stats at Pro Football Reference

Darren Henry Studstill (born August 9, 1970) is an American former professional football player who was a safety in the National Football League (NFL) for the Dallas Cowboys, New York Jets and Jacksonville Jaguars. He also was a member of the London Monarchs in the World League of American Football (WLAF). In 1994, he was selected in the sixth round by the Dallas Cowboys. He played college football at West Virginia University.

== Early life ==
Studstill attended Palm Beach Gardens Community High School, where he lettered in football, basketball, baseball and track.

He accepted a football scholarship from West Virginia University. As a redshirt freshman, he was the backup to quarterback Greg Jones. He also set a new school record with a 76-yard touchdown pass to James Jett against the University of Cincinnati.

In 1991, he was named the starting quarterback, throwing for 1,055 yards with 8 touchdowns and rushing for 307 yards with 2 touchdowns. His starting debut ended early when he suffered a shoulder strain early in the second quarter against the University of Pittsburgh. He returned to action against the University of South Carolina, throwing for 176 yards and rushing for 50 yards.

As a junior, he began sharing the starting position with transfer Jake Kelchner, both players were talented but with very different skill sets. Kelchner was the prototype pocket passer, while Studstill was an all-around athletic player. Head coach Don Nehlen never named a full-time starter, and kept it as a shared position throughout the tenure of both players. He passed for over 1,000 yards for the second consecutive season, posting 1,065 yards passing with 9 touchdowns, while rushing for 65 yards on 39 carries with 2 touchdowns. With a 20-point fourth quarter against the University of Maryland, he engineered the biggest comeback in school history, passing 16 out of 21 attempts for 166 yards and 3 touchdowns, with scoring drives of 78, 73 and 55 yards. With Kelchner out with an injury against the University of Miami, he played the entire game connecting 28 out of 41 attempts for 308 yards. Against Louisiana Tech University he had a 78-yard touchdown pass to Jett, breaking his own school record.

As a senior, the Mountaineers' went undefeated in the 1993 regular season. While rotating with Kelchner, he completed 48 passes for 760 yards with 8 touchdowns, rushing for 145 yards on 25 carries with one touchdown. He saw his first action in the third game against the University of Missouri and had his best performance of the season against Rutgers University, completing on 11 of 16 attempts for a season-high 214 yards and 3 touchdowns.

West Virginia played the Florida Gators in the 1994 Sugar Bowl. The Mountaineers first drive went 80-yards and scored on a pass, then stopped the Gators on their first drive. The next Gator-drive almost went three-and-out, until a personal foul on Steve Perkins gave Florida the momentum. Kelchner was playing a good game, but Nehlen surprised many by putting Studstill in. On the Mountaineers first drive, Studstill threw an interception. Florida ran off with the game after that, winning 41–7.

He finished ranked sixth on the school's all-time list in career touchdown passes (27) and seventh in attempts (456) and passing yards (3,158).

== Professional career ==
=== Dallas Cowboys ===
Studstill was not considered a pro style quarterback entering the NFL because of his inaccuracy and was selected by the Dallas Cowboys in the sixth round (191st overall) of the 1994 NFL draft, with the intention of being converted into a defensive back. He spent most of his rookie season in the practice squad, until being promoted to the active roster on November 30. He appeared in one game, while being declared inactive in 3 contests and the playoffs. He tallied 2 special teams tackles. He was cut on August 22, 1995.

=== New York Jets ===
In October 1995, he was signed to the New York Jets' practice squad.

=== Jacksonville Jaguars ===
On October 10, 1995, he was signed from the New York Jets' practice squad to replace an injured Darren Carrington. He suffered a sprained knee in the seventh game against the Chicago Bears and missed the following 2 contests. He appeared in 8 of the last 10 games and collected one special teams tackle.

In 1996, he was allocated to the London Monarchs of the World League of American Football. He was a starter at free safety and tied for the league lead with five interceptions (one returned for a touchdown), while making 51 tackles (second on the team). In the NFL regular season, he appeared in 7 games with no starts and was declared inactive in 9 contests. He had 6 special teams tackles, including 3 in season finale against the Atlanta Falcons. He played in all 3 playoff games, making 3 special teams tackles (tied for fourth on team). He was released on August 19, 1997.

== Coaching career ==
After being named head coach of the Royal Palm Beach High School just one season earlier, Studstill was fired in August 2009, just days before the start of training camp for the 2009–2010 season. He was dismissed despite great success on the field in his inaugural campaign, partly because he and Principal Guarn Sims differed over the way Studstill handled finances and supervised his assistant coaches, though no one alleged deliberate wrongdoing by Studstill.

In one season under Studstill, the team went 11-2 and reached the regional finals. He was a finalist for the county's Lou Groza Coach of the Year award. Before being fired, Studstill was given at least two opportunities to resign but declined. An official for the school was quoted as saying "In no way is it an attack on his personal or professional character. This is an isolated issue that directly deals with the direction of the football program." He will also retain his position at the school as a disciplinarian.

In 2010, he was hired to be an assistant coach for the Suncoast Community High School.

== Personal life ==
Studstill's son Devin, was a safety at the University of Notre Dame. In 2019, he transferred to the University of South Florida as a graduate.
