= Al Jackson (American football) =

American football player (born 1971)

No. 26
- Position: Cornerback

Personal information
- Born: September 7, 1971 (age 55); Pensacola, Florida, U.S.
- Listed height: 6 ft 0 in (1.83 m)
- Listed weight: 182 lb (83 kg)

Career information
- High school: Pine Forest (Pensacola)
- College: Georgia
- NFL draft: 1993: undrafted

Career history
- Philadelphia Eagles (1994); Jacksonville Jaguars (1995–1996)
- Stats at Pro Football Reference

Alfonza Jackson (born September 7, 1971) is an American former professional football cornerback who played for the Philadelphia Eagles of the National Football League (NFL). He played college football for the Georgia Bulldogs.

== Early life ==
Alfonza Jackson was born on September 7, 1971, in Pensacola, Florida. He attended Pine Forest High School in Pensacola.

== College career ==
Jackson enrolled at the University of Georgia to play college football for the Bulldogs. He was a four-year letterman from 1989 to 1992. He pulled a groin muscle in the 1993 Florida Citrus Bowl, rendering him unable to work out for NFL scouts. He later stated that he was barely able to walk.

== Professional career ==
Jackson returned to the University of Georgia for the 1993 semester to finish his criminal justice degree. He was also an assistant coach on the football team. Jackson said he received offers to play "in Canada and the Arena League, and some other crappy leagues like that" but declined them.

Jackson signed with the Philadelphia Eagles on April 27, 1994. He played in 11 games during the 1994 season as a reserve cornerback, posting two solo tackles.

On February 15, 1995, Jackson was selected by the Jacksonville Jaguars with the 13th pick in the 1995 NFL expansion draft. He won the team's nickelback job for the 1995 season. In the Jaguars' system, the nickelback was the fifth defensive back on the depth chart, not a starter. In late August, Jackson suffered a season-ending torn ACL during practice. He became a free agent after the 1995 season and re-signed with Jacksonville on May 30, 1996. On July 18, he was placed on the physically unable to perform due to his ACL not having healed yet. Jackson became a free agent again after the 1996 season and was not re-signed by the Jaguars.
