= Mike Hollis =

American football player (born 1972)

No. 1
- Position: Placekicker

Personal information
- Born: May 22, 1972 (age 54); Kellogg, Idaho, U.S.
- Listed height: 5 ft 7 in (1.70 m)
- Listed weight: 179 lb (81 kg)

Career information
- High school: Central Valley (Spokane Valley, Washington)
- College: Idaho
- NFL draft: 1994: undrafted

Career history
- San Diego Chargers (1994)*; Jacksonville Jaguars (1995–2001); Buffalo Bills (2002); New York Giants (2003); Jacksonville Sharks (2022)
- * Offseason or practice squad member only

Awards and highlights
- Pro Bowl (1998); NFL scoring leader (1997)

Career NFL statistics
- Field goals: 200
- Field goal attempts: 250
- Field goal %: 80
- Longest field goal: 54
- Stats at Pro Football Reference

Michael Shane Hollis (born May 22, 1972) is an American former professional football player who was a placekicker in the National Football League (NFL) from 1994 to 2003. He led the NFL in scoring (1997 season) and becoming the most accurate kicker in NFL history during that time. He spent most of his nine-year NFL career with the Jacksonville Jaguars, kicking for the team from 1995–2001 and setting several team records. He then played for the Buffalo Bills and New York Giants before initially retiring after an injury in 2003. He signed with the Jacksonville Sharks in 2022 after almost 20 years of retirement.

== Early life ==
Born in Kellogg, Idaho, Hollis grew up in eastern Washington in the Spokane area and graduated from Central Valley High School in 1990. He kicked for the University of Idaho in 1992 and 1993, after two seasons at Wenatchee Valley College.

== Professional career ==
=== Jacksonville Jaguars ===
Hollis was signed as an undrafted free agent by the expansion Jacksonville Jaguars in the team's inaugural 1995 season. He played for the Jaguars for seven seasons, setting a number of the new club's kicking records.

=== Buffalo Bills ===
He was released following the 2001 season and was picked up by the Buffalo Bills, for whom he played for one season in 2002.

=== New York Giants ===
He was signed by the New York Giants in 2003, but missed the 2003 season after being placed on injured reserve after hurting his back, a problem he battled for several seasons. He never recovered from the injury and failed his physical in March 2004, ending his NFL career.

=== Jacksonville Sharks ===
After being retired from the NFL for almost 20 years, Hollis joined the Jacksonville Sharks in the NAL in 2022. Since his retirement from the NFL, Hollis has been staying in shape through his ProForm Kicking Academy where he teaches a unique form of kicking and punting. On June 6, 2022, Hollis was released by the Sharks.
