= Tom McManus (American football) =

American football player (born 1970)

No. 55
- Position: Linebacker

Personal information
- Born: July 30, 1970 (age 56); Buffalo Grove, Illinois, U.S.
- Listed height: 6 ft 2 in (1.88 m)
- Listed weight: 252 lb (114 kg)

Career information
- High school: Wheeling
- College: Boston College
- NFL draft: 1993: undrafted

Career history
- New Orleans Saints (1993)*; Jacksonville Jaguars (1995–1999)
- * Offseason or practice squad member only

Awards and highlights
- First-team All-East (1991)

Career NFL statistics
- Total tackles: 117
- Forced fumbles: 1
- Stats at Pro Football Reference

Thomas Edward McManus (born July 30, 1970) is an American former professional football player who was a linebacker for the Jacksonville Jaguars of the National Football League (NFL). He played college football for the Boston College Eagles.

McManus began his career playing football in the fourth grade at St. Mary's of Buffalo Grove, Illinois. He played high school football at Wheeling High School in Wheeling, Illinois.

Following McManus's high school career, he would go on to play football at Boston College under head coach Tom Coughlin. Coughlin would later coach McManus in the NFL with the Jacksonville Jaguars. During McManus's senior year at Boston College, he was a third-team All-American along with being a two time First-team All-Big East Linebacker. McManus completed his bachelor's degree in marketing.

He was signed as an undrafted free agent by the New Orleans Saints in 1993, even though he played his entire career for the Jacksonville Jaguars.

McManus currently resides in Jacksonville, Florida with his wife Kristina and their three children Avery, Kelsey and Harley. Kristina McManus is also a Jacksonville Jaguar Roar alumni.

McManus hosts a TV & Radio sports and entertainment show called "Tom McManus Uncensored." The show airs 6-9 am ET on Jacksonville's WFXJ (AM). The television show airs weekly on WCWJ.

McManus has written a book titled, “We'll Always Be Pals." The book describes his relationship with his father, Gene McManus, who despite a 50-year age difference, are best friends. Gene McManus died of cancer at age 75 in 1995.
