= Jeff Novak =

American football player (born 1967)

No. 79, 67
- Positions: Guard, tackle

Personal information
- Born: July 26, 1967 (age 59); Arlington Heights, Illinois, U.S.
- Listed height: 6 ft 6 in (1.98 m)
- Listed weight: 297 lb (135 kg)

Career information
- High school: Clear Lake (Houston, Texas)
- College: Texas State
- NFL draft: 1990: 7th round, 172nd overall pick
- Expansion draft: 1995: 3rd round, 5th overall pick

Career history
- San Diego Chargers (1990–1991)*; Montreal Machine (1991-1992); New York Giants (1992–1993)*; Miami Dolphins (1993–1994); Jacksonville Jaguars (1995–1998)
- * Offseason or practice squad member only

Career NFL statistics
- Games played: 38
- Games started: 15
- Stats at Pro Football Reference

Jeff Ladd Novak (born July 27, 1967) is an American former professional football player who was an offensive lineman in the World League of American Football (WLAF) and National Football League (NFL). Novak was born in Arlington Heights, Illinois, and grew up in Clear Lake City outside Houston, Texas. He went to Clear Lake High School before playing college football for the Southwest Texas State Bobcats (now Texas State).

== Professional career ==
Novak was selected 172nd overall in the seventh round as a guard in the 1990 NFL draft by the San Diego Chargers, but was cut and signed by the World Football League. He played for the Montreal Machine in 1990 and 1991. The New York Giants signed him in 1991 and he made the team as a development player. He played for the Giants in 1991 and 1992 and later went to the Miami Dolphins and made the active roster to play for 1993 and 1994. Novak was signed by the Miami Dolphins in 1994. In 1995, he was taken in the expansion draft that brought the first NFL team to Jacksonville, Florida. Novak played for the Jacksonville Jaguars until he was placed on injured reserve in November, 1998. His Jaguar contract expired at the end of 1998 and was not renewed.

== End of a career ==
During a pre-season game, Novak injured his leg which had recently suffered a severe hematoma during a practice. Novak contracted a staph infection in the leg which caused a permanent disability. In June 2002, Novak sued the team physician for malpractice and sought $7.8 million in compensation. The judge eventually dismissed the case.

== Personal life ==
Along with Will Furrer and Tony Boselli, Novak is one of the partners of IF marketing & advertising, an agency founded in 2002 and based in Georgetown, Texas with an office in Jacksonville, Florida. The firm was initially named, Intra-Focus.

In 2010, Novak teamed up with his brother, Jack, and licensed architect, Jim Cramer to launch Novak Brothers, a real estate planning and development company. In June 2011, Novak Brothers broke ground on The Brownstone at The Summit, a community of custom single-family homes inspired by 19th-century brownstones found in Chicago and New York. The Brownstone is part of The Summit at Rivery Park, a 36-acre mixed-use development located in Georgetown, Texas.
