= Mickey Washington =

American football player (born 1968)

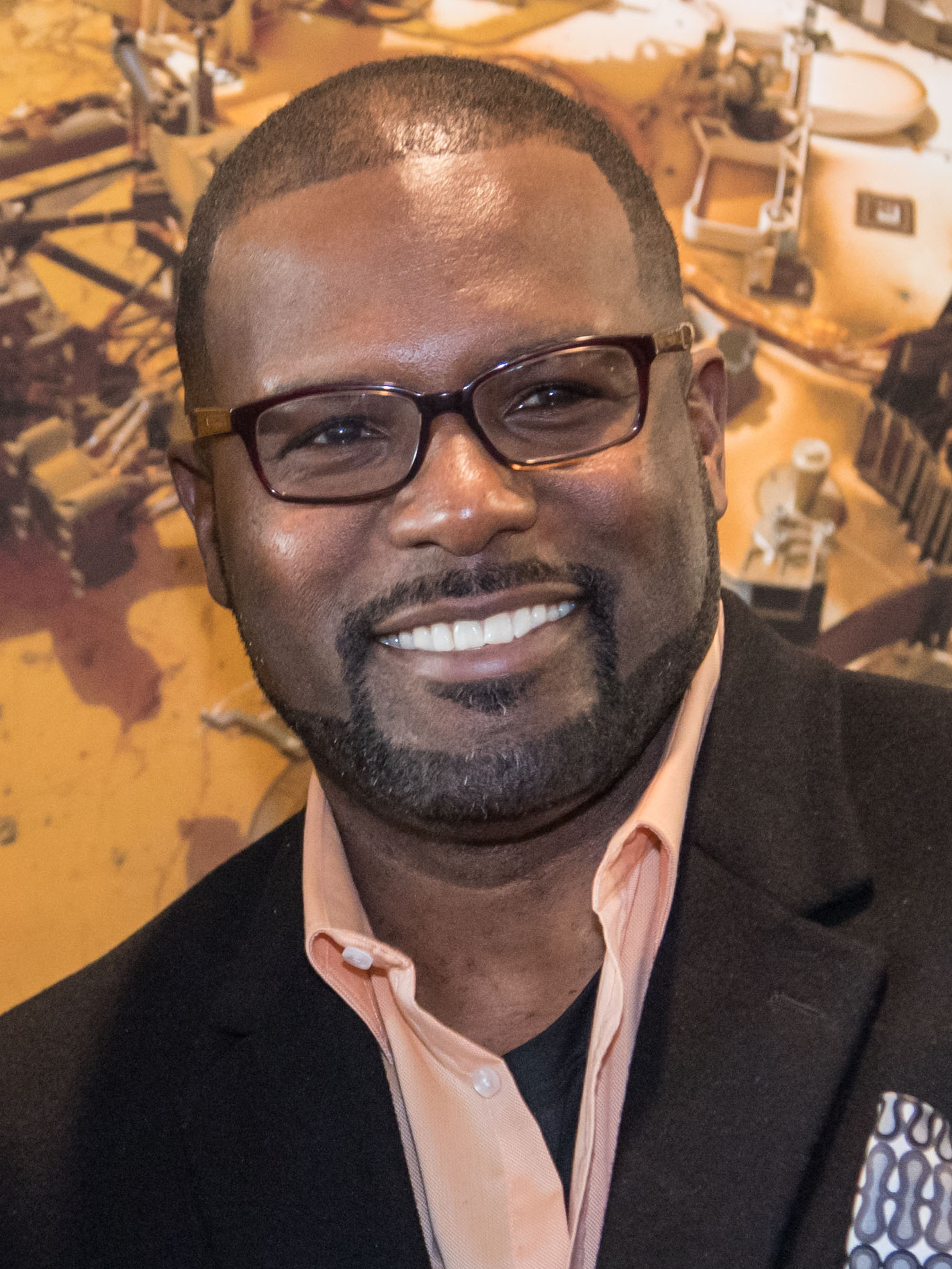
- Washington in 2017

No. 21, 25, 26
- Position: Cornerback

Personal information
- Born: June 8, 1968 (age 58); Port Arthur, Texas, U.S.
- Listed height: 5 ft 9 in (1.75 m)
- Listed weight: 195 lb (88 kg)

Career information
- High school: West Brook (Beaumont, Texas)
- College: Texas A&M
- NFL draft: 1990: 8th round, 199th overall pick

Career history
- Phoenix Cardinals (1990)*; Indianapolis Colts (1990}*; New England Patriots (1990–1991); Pittsburgh Steelers (1992)*; Washington Redskins (1992); Buffalo Bills (1993–1994); Jacksonville Jaguars (1995–1996); New Orleans Saints (1997)
- * Offseason or practice squad member only

Awards and highlights
- First-team All-SWC (1988)

Career NFL statistics
- Tackles: 367
- Interceptions: 10
- Touchdowns: 2
- Stats at Pro Football Reference

Mickey Lin Washington (born July 8, 1968) is an American former professional football player who played cornerback in the National Football League (NFL) for eight seasons for the New England Patriots (1990–1991), Washington Redskins (1992), Buffalo Bills (1993–1994), Jacksonville Jaguars (1995–1996), and New Orleans Saints (1997). He was selected by the Phoenix Cardinals in the eighth round of the 1990 NFL draft with the 199th overall pick.
