= Mike Maser =

American football coach (1947–2019)

Personal information
- Born: March 2, 1947; Plattsburgh, New York, U.S.
- Died: July 14, 2019 (aged 72)

Mike Maser (March 2, 1947 – July 14, 2019) was an American football offensive line coach for the Miami Dolphins of the National Football League (NFL) in 2008. He previously served in the same capacity for the Carolina Panthers from 2003 to 2006 and the Jacksonville Jaguars from 1995 to 2002. He had over three decades of college and pro coaching experience.

Born in Plattsburgh, New York, Maser died July 14, 2019, in Charlotte, North Carolina.

== Coaching history ==
- 1973 Marshall University (GA)
- 1974-1978 Bluefield State College (OL)
- 1979-1980 University of Maine (OL)
- 1981-1993 Boston College (OL)
- 1995-2002 Jacksonville Jaguars (OL)
- 2003-2006 Carolina Panthers (OL)
- 2008 Miami Dolphins (OL)
