= Le'Shai Maston =

American football player (born 1970)

No. 47, 35, 36
- Position: Running back

Personal information
- Born: October 7, 1970 (age 56); Dallas, Texas, U.S.

Career information
- High school: Dallas Carter
- College: Baylor

Career history

Playing
- Houston Oilers (1993–1994); Jacksonville Jaguars (1995–1996); Washington Redskins (1998)

Coaching
- Providence Christian School of Dallas (2009–2018); Good Shepherd episcopal school (2019-present)

Awards and highlights
- 2× First-team All-SWC (1991, 1992)

Career NFL statistics
- Rushing attempts: 50
- Rushing yards: 218
- Receptions: 27
- Receiving yards: 211
- Stats at Pro Football Reference

Le'Shai Edwoin Maston (born October 7, 1970) is an American former professional football player who was a running back in the National Football League (NFL) and current Chief of Police in the Crowley Independent School District. He played college football for the Baylor Bears. From 1993 to 1998, Maston played for the NFL teams Houston Oilers, Jacksonville Jaguars, and Washington Redskins.

Maston graduated from David W. Carter High School of Dallas in 1989 and was a member of the Carter 1988 Texas state championship football team, that later had to forfeit the championship due to eligibility reasons. He then attended Baylor University and played on the Baylor Bears football team from 1989 to 1992. In 1995, Maston graduated with a degree in business management. Maston is a member of the Omega Psi Phi fraternity.

Maston became an officer for the Dallas Police Department in 1999. In 2009, Maston became head football coach at Providence Christian School of Dallas. In 2021, Maston became the first Chief of Police in the Crowley ISD.
