= Rich Griffith =

American football player (born 1969)

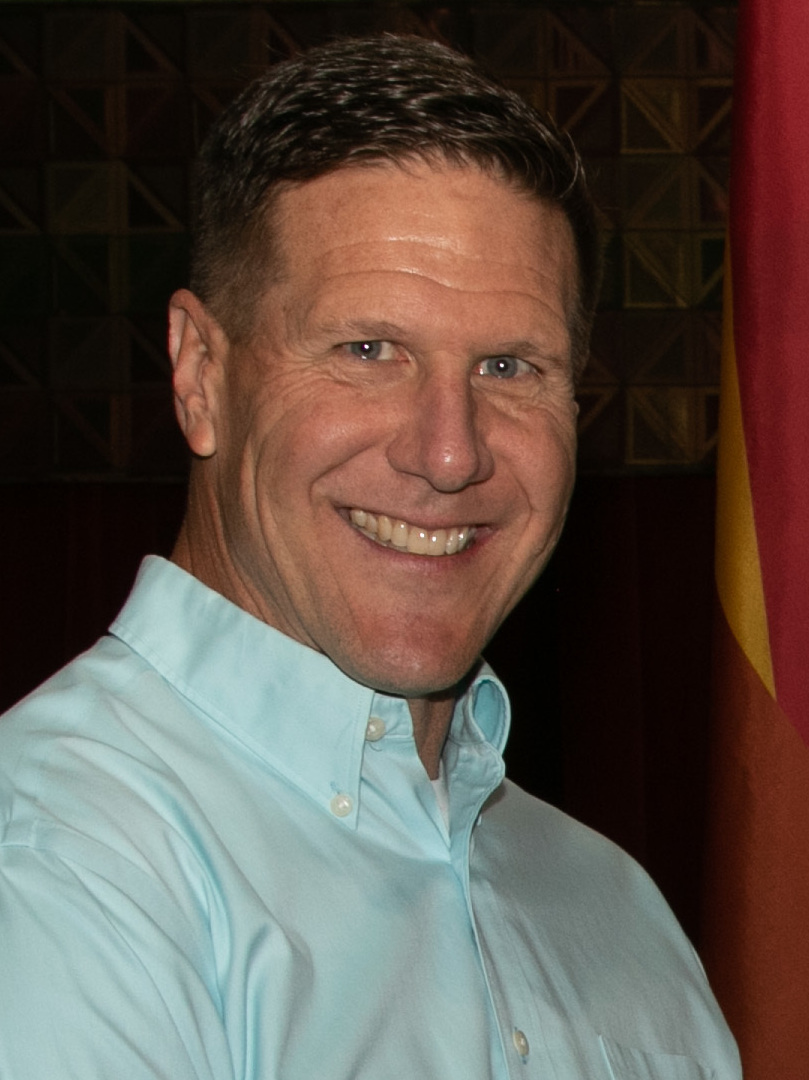
- Griffith in 2023

No. 88, 85
- Position: Tight end

Personal information
- Born: July 31, 1969 (age 57); Batesville, Arkansas, U.S.
- Listed height: 6 ft 5 in (1.96 m)
- Listed weight: 262 lb (119 kg)

Career information
- High school: Catalina (Tucson, Arizona)
- College: Arizona
- NFL draft: 1993: 5th round, 138th overall pick

Career history
- New England Patriots (1993); Jacksonville Jaguars (1995–2000)

Career NFL statistics
- Receptions: 21
- Receiving yards: 296
- Return yards: 33
- Stats at Pro Football Reference

Richard Pope Griffith (born July 31, 1969) is an American former professional football player who played tight end for seven seasons for the New England Patriots and Jacksonville Jaguars.

== College career ==
Griffith was a four-year starter for the University of Arizona Wildcats. He caught 26 passes for 363 yards and two touchdowns in his college career. He was named to the All-Pac-10 team following his senior year.

== Professional football ==
Griffith was selected by New England in the fifth round of the 1993 NFL draft with the 138th overall pick.

Griffith signed with the Jaguars in January 1995 as a veteran free agent and was a member of the Jaguars inaugural team. He retired from football in 2001. His primary job as a member of the Jaguars was that of a long snapper.

== Personal life ==
Following his NFL career, Griffith took a position as the Northeast Florida area director of the Fellowship of Christian Athletes. He is currently residing in Phoenix and is the Campus Pastor of Scottsdale Bible Church Fountain Hills.
