= Keith Goganious =

American football player and coach (born 1968)

No. 95, 50, 54
- Position: Linebacker

Personal information
- Born: December 7, 1968 (age 57); Virginia Beach, Virginia, U.S.
- Listed height: 6 ft 3 in (1.91 m)
- Listed weight: 244 lb (111 kg)

Career information
- High school: Green Run (Virginia Beach)
- College: Penn State
- NFL draft: 1992: 3rd round, 83rd overall pick
- Expansion draft: 1995: 5th round, 9th overall pick

Career history

Playing
- Buffalo Bills (1992–1994); Jacksonville Jaguars (1995); Tampa Bay Buccaneers (1996)*; Baltimore Ravens (1996)
- * Offseason or practice squad member only

Coaching
- North Point HS (MD) (2004–2006) Head coach; Hampton (2009–2013) Assistant; Bishop McNamara HS (MD) (2013–2016) Head coach

Operations
- Bishop McNamara HS (MD) (2013–2016) Assistant athletic director

Awards and highlights
- Second-team All-East (1991)

Career NFL statistics
- Tackles: 188
- Sacks: 1
- Interceptions: 2
- Stats at Pro Football Reference

Keith Lorenzo Goganious (born December 7, 1968) is an American former football player and coach. He played professionally as a linebacker in the National Football League (NFL) for five seasons with the Buffalo Bills, Jacksonville Jaguars and Baltimore Ravens. He was selected 83rd overall in the third round of the 1992 NFL Draft by the Bills. He played college football at Pennsylvania State University.

Goganious served as head football coach and assistant athletic director of the Bishop McNamara High School in Prince George's County, Maryland from 2013 to 2016. He was an assistant coach at Hampton University from 2009 to 2013.
