= Fran Foley =

American football executive (born 1961/62)

Profile
- Position: Offensive tackle

Personal information
- Born: 1961 or 1962 (age 64–65)

Career information
- High school: Worcester Academy (Worcester, Massachusetts)
- College: Framingham State (1980–1981)
- NFL draft: 1983: undrafted

Career history

Coaching
- Worcester Academy (1983) Volunteer assistant; Colgate (1984) Graduate assistant; The Citadel (1985) Graduate assistant; Rutgers (1986) Graduate assistant; Boston College (1991) Tight ends / kickers assistant

Operations
- Rutgers (1987–1990) Administrative assistant; Boston College (1992–1993) Departmental recruiting coordinator / administrative assistant; Jacksonville Jaguars (1994–1996) Assistant director of pro personnel; Jacksonville Jaguars (1997–2002) Director of pro scouting; San Diego Chargers (2003–2005) Director of pro scouting; Minnesota Vikings (2006) Vice president of player personnel / de facto general manager; Maryland (2010–2015) Director of football operations
- Executive profile at Pro Football Reference

Fran Foley (born 1961 or 1962) is an American former football player, coach, executive and administrator. He is best known for his brief stint as de facto general manager of the Minnesota Vikings of the National Football League (NFL), a post he held from January to May 2006.

After playing college football for the Framingham State Rams, Foley had assistant coaching positions at Worcester Academy, for the Colgate Raiders, The Citadel Bulldogs, Rutgers Scarlet Knights and Boston College Eagles between 1983 and 1991. He then served as an executive with the Jacksonville Jaguars in the NFL from 1994 to 2002, and with the San Diego Chargers from 2003 to 2005 before being hired by the Vikings in 2006. After a brief tenure of three months marked with controversy and what was perceived as poor selections in the 2006 NFL draft, Foley was dismissed by the team. After his NFL career, he worked with the Maryland Terrapins in an administrative role.

== Early life ==
Foley was born in 1961 or 1962 and grew up in Worcester, Massachusetts, where he attended Worcester Academy and played football under coaches Mike Sherman and Kirk Ferentz. He then played college football as an offensive tackle for the Framingham State Rams from 1980 to 1981, missing the following two years due to injury. He was a member of the scout team while injured in 1982, later receiving an undergraduate degree in English literature in 1984.

== Coaching, executive and administrative career ==
Foley began his coaching career while still attending Framingham State in 1983, serving as a volunteer football coach at Worcester Academy. He then served as a graduate assistant for the Colgate Raiders in 1984, for The Citadel Bulldogs in 1985, and for the Rutgers Scarlet Knights in 1986. From 1987 to 1990, Foley was an administrative assistant at Rutgers.

After his four-season stint as an administrator, Foley again became a coach in 1991, joining the Boston College Eagles as an assistant working with the tight ends and placekickers. After a year in the position, he served from 1992 to 1993 as a departmental recruiting coordinator for Tom Coughlin and as an administrative assistant, helping the team sign several top recruits.

Foley followed Coughlin to the Jacksonville Jaguars of the National Football League (NFL) in 1994, becoming the assistant director of pro personnel for the newly-formed expansion franchise that started play in 1995. He helped the team reach the AFC Championship in their second year of existence and helped them reach the playoffs each year from 1996 to 1999, including division championships in two of those years. He received a promotion to director of pro scouting in 1997 and remained with the team through 2002. Foley was hired by the San Diego Chargers as director of pro scouting in 2003. He helped them win the division title in his second season with the team, their first since 1992.

After three seasons with the Chargers, Foley was hired by the Minnesota Vikings as vice president of player personnel on January 26, 2006. He also became the team's de facto general manager, although he was not all-powerful in the team's personnel department, being part of what was called the "Triangle of Authority", which featured him, coach Brad Childress and executive Rob Brzezinski working together to make decisions.

In mid-April, less than three months into his tenure, his hiring was put under scrutiny when it was revealed Foley's media biography gave "embellished" details about his playing career at Framingham State, which Foley called a "clerical error". Soon after, it was revealed that his biography also overstated information about his coaching stints at Colgate, The Citadel and Rutgers, and his roles with the Jacksonville Jaguars. He said that he did "nothing to misrepresent what I've done," but a Star Tribune journalist called it a "lie" and asserted that "He did everything to misrepresent what he had done".

Three days after the 2006 NFL draft, when the Vikings made several selections that were widely criticized, the team announced that Foley had been fired, just three months into his tenure. He sued the team for wrongful termination, claiming that he had only left the Chargers due to his Vikings contract being three years guaranteed, and that the Vikings in firing him had breached that contract. His lawyer also claimed that he had been "unfairly defamed ... he wants people to understand that he's always been honest." They reached an undisclosed settlement in August 2006. Despite the criticism his draft selections received, a 247Sports piece from 2009 noted that "perhaps Foley wasn't so bad after all", stating that five of the team's six selections ended up being quality starters.

After his stint with the Vikings, Foley spent time as a development director at the Baptist Health Foundation. In 2010, he joined the Maryland Terrapins football team as Director of Operations, working with Randy Edsall whom he had been with on two prior coaching staffs. He was relieved of his duties along with Edsall in October 2015.

== Personal life ==
Foley is married and has two children.
