= Darren Carrington =

American football player (born 1966)

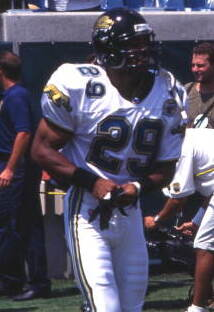
- Carrington with the Jacksonville Jaguars in 1995

No. 29, 27, 21
- Position: Safety

Personal information
- Born: October 10, 1966 (age 60); Bronx, New York, U.S.
- Listed height: 6 ft 2 in (1.88 m)
- Listed weight: 200 lb (91 kg)

Career information
- High school: James Monroe (Bronx)
- College: Northern Arizona
- NFL draft: 1989: 5th round, 134th overall pick
- Expansion draft: 1995: 14th round, 27th overall pick

Career history
- Denver Broncos (1989); Detroit Lions (1990); San Diego Chargers (1991–1994); Jacksonville Jaguars (1995); Oakland Raiders (1996)

Career NFL statistics
- Total tackles: 299
- Interceptions: 22
- Touchdowns: 1
- Stats at Pro Football Reference

Darren Russell Carrington (born October 10, 1966) is an American former professional football player who was a safety for eight seasons in the National Football League (NFL) for five different teams. He played college football for the Northern Arizona Lumberjacks, averaging over 27 yards per kickoff return, with a career best of 99 yards. As a senior in 1988, he had 39 tackles, two interceptions and two forced fumbles, which was enough to get him selected in the fifth round of the 1989 NFL draft.

== Professional career ==
Pre-draft measurables
Height	Weight	40-yard dash	10-yard split	20-yard split	20-yard shuttle	Vertical jump	Broad jump	Bench press
6 ft 1 5/8 in (1.87 m)	187 lb (85 kg)	4.54 s	1.52 s	2.70 s	4.00 s	34.2 in (0.87 m)	9 ft 10 in (3.00 m)	12 reps

Carrington was selected by the Denver Broncos in the fifth round, with the 134th overall selection, of the 1989 NFL draft.

Carrington started in Super Bowl XXIX for the San Diego Chargers and was the Broncos kick returner in Super Bowl XXIV, which he finished with a franchise-record 6 kickoff returns (now shared with Glyn Milburn and Reuben Droughns) for 146 yards, including a 39-yard return that set up the Broncos only touchdown of the game. His best season was in 1993, when he intercepted 7 passes and returned them for 104 yards. He was selected by the Jacksonville Jaguars in the 1995 NFL expansion draft.

In his eight NFL seasons, Carrington intercepted 22 passes and returned them for 377 yards and a touchdown. He also returned 6 kickoffs for 176 yards. As of 2017's NFL off-season, he held the Broncos franchise record for most kick returns in a playoff game (6 in Super Bowl XXIV; with Glyn Milburn and Reuben Droughns), and average yards per return in a single post-season (24.63 in 1989).

== Personal life ==
Darren Carrington is a 1984 graduate of James Monroe High School. Carrington lives in San Diego with his wife and three children. He works as the marriage and parenting pastor for the Rock Church.

His son Darren II played wide receiver for the Oregon Ducks until he was dismissed following a DUI arrest. He played his senior year for the Utah Utes.

His daughter Daria is the head coach of the West Coast Breeze of The Basketball League.

Another daughter, DiJonai Carrington, plays for the Chicago Sky of the WNBA and Mist BC of the Unrivaled league after previously playing for the Baylor Bears and Stanford Cardinal women's basketball teams.
