= Toms River High School =

Toms River High School may refer to any of three high schools in the Toms River Regional Schools district.

- Toms River High School East, 1225 Raider Way opened in 1979
- Toms River High School North, 1245 Old Freehold Road opened in 1969
- Toms River High School South, 55 Hyers Street dates back to 1891 and was known simply as Toms River High School until North opened
