= Tim Lester =

Tim Lester may refer to:

- Tim Lester (American football coach) (born 1977), current head football coach at Western Michigan and former quarterback
- Tim Lester (running back) (born 1968), former Rams, Steelers, and Cowboys player
