= Robert Bailey (American football) =

American football player (born 1968)

No. 28, 23, 35
- Position: Cornerback

Personal information
- Born: September 3, 1968 (age 58); Bridgetown, Barbados
- Listed height: 5 ft 9 in (1.75 m)
- Listed weight: 176 lb (80 kg)

Career information
- High school: Miami Southridge (Miami, Florida, U.S.)
- College: Miami (FL)
- NFL draft: 1991: 4th round, 107th overall pick

Career history
- Los Angeles Rams (1991–1994); Washington Redskins (1995); Dallas Cowboys (1995); Miami Dolphins (1996); Detroit Lions (1997–1999); Baltimore Ravens (2000); Detroit Lions (2001)

Awards and highlights
- 2× Super Bowl champion (XXX, XXXV); 2× National champion (1987, 1989); Second-team All-South Independent (1990); NFL record: Longest punt return: 103 yards

Career NFL statistics
- Interceptions: 10
- Interception yards: 215
- Touchdowns: 2
- Stats at Pro Football Reference

Robert Martin Bailey (born September 3, 1968) is a former American football cornerback in the National Football League (NFL) for the Los Angeles Rams, Washington Redskins, Dallas Cowboys, Detroit Lions, and the Baltimore Ravens. He played college football at the University of Miami.

== Early life ==
Bailey attended Miami Southridge High School, where he lettered in football and track & field.

He accepted a scholarship from the University of Miami. As a junior, he started one game and recovered a blocked punt for a touchdown. He started every game in his last year, while tallying 75 tackles, one interception and 11 passes defensed.

== Professional career ==
=== Los Angeles Rams ===
Bailey was selected by the Los Angeles Rams in the fourth round (107th overall) of the 1991 NFL draft. As a rookie, he started the season on the injured reserve list for the first 5 games with a broken bone in his right hand. The tip of Bailey's left ring finger was torn off while playing against the Detroit Lions and he was placed on injured reserve for the remaining games.

On October 23, 1994, Bailey made the longest punt return in NFL history when he ran 103 yards for a touchdown in a game against the New Orleans Saints. What makes this return stand out is that every single player on the field assumed the ball was going to bounce through the end zone after the punt. Bailey saw that the ball never bounced out of the end zone and was still in play. He scooped up the ball and returned it for a touchdown before anyone on the Saints realized what had happened.

=== Washington Redskins ===
On September 12, 1995, he signed as a free agent with the Washington Redskins to take the place of the injured Muhammad Oliver. He played in 4 games before being released on October 16, to make room for wide receiver Olanda Truitt.

=== Dallas Cowboys ===
On October 19, 1995, he was signed by the Dallas Cowboys. He played mainly as a special teams player, until being named the nickel back after Clayton Holmes was suspended under the NFL substance abuse policy.

=== Miami Dolphins ===
On March 7, 1996, the Miami Dolphins signed him as a free agent.

=== Baltimore Ravens ===
For the 2000 season, he signed with the Baltimore Ravens. He was the team's nickel back, recording 27 tackles, 4 passes defensed, one forced fumble, one fumble recovery and 7 special teams tackles. He earned his second Super Bowl ring when the Ravens defeated the New York Giants in Super Bowl XXXV at the end of the season. On March 12, 2001, he was released in a salary cap move.

=== Detroit Lions (second stint) ===
On May 17, 2001, he was signed by the Detroit Lions to be the team's dime back. He played in 9 games before suffering a broken neck against the Green Bay Packers that ended his career.

== Personal life ==
Bailey works in the sports marketing business as President of Rosenhaus Sports. ESPN broadcaster Chris Berman once nicknamed him "Beetle" after the comic strip character.
