= Ted Gillen =

American soccer player and coach

Personal information
- Full name: Ted Gillen
- Date of birth: August 16, 1968 (age 58)
- Place of birth: Kearny, New Jersey, United States
- Height: 5 ft 10 in (1.78 m)
- Position: Defender

Youth career
- 1986–1989: Penn State

Senior career*
Years	Team	Apps	(Gls)
1990	Kiveton Park		
1990–1991	Penn-Jersey Spirit		
1991	Albany Capitals	1	(0)
1991–1992	San Diego Sockers (indoor)		
1993	Richmond Kickers		
1996	MetroStars	15	(0)
1997–1999	New Jersey Stallions		

International career
1988	United States	3	(0)

Managerial career
- 1990, 1993–1996: Penn State (assistant)
- University of Maryland (assistant)
- Syracuse University (assistant)
- 2002–: Toms River High School North
- Toms River High School East
- U12 GIRLS TRFC COPA
- * Club domestic league appearances and goals

Ted Gillen (born August 16, 1968, in Kearny, New Jersey) is a former U.S. soccer defender who currently coaches men's high school soccer. Gillen played one season in Major Soccer League, two in the American Professional Soccer League, one in USISL and one in Major League Soccer. He earned three caps with the U.S. national team in 1988. He has also served as an assistant soccer coach at several universities.

== Youth and college ==
Gillen was born in Kearny, New Jersey and grew up in Toms River, New Jersey. Gillen began playing soccer when he was four years old. At the time, his older brother was playing and after watching him play, Gillen insisted on also playing. He attended Toms River High School East winning the 1985 New Jersey Group IV High School soccer championship. Gillen then attended Pennsylvania State University where he played as a left back on the men's soccer team from 1986 to 1989. Gillen graduated with a bachelor's degree in business. In July 1990, the Cleveland Crunch of Major Soccer League selected Gillen with the tenth pick of that year's draft. However, he decided against signing with the Crunch and instead became an assistant coach with Penn State before attending James Madison University. He graduated from JMU with an MBA.

== Professional ==
In 1990, Gillen signed with the Penn-Jersey Spirit of the American Professional Soccer League. He returned to the Spirit for the 1991 season, but also played one game, for a total of 34 minutes, with the Albany Capitals. He then signed with the San Diego Sockers for the 1991–1992 Major Soccer League season. In 1993, he played for the Richmond Kickers of USISL. That fall, he returned to Penn State to become an assistant coach. On February 6, 1996, Gillen returned to professional soccer when the MetroStars of Major League Soccer selected Gillen in the sixth round (59th overall) of the Inaugural MLS Draft. He played fifteen regular season games before leaving the MetroStars at the end of the season. In 1997, Gillen signed with the third division New Jersey Stallions of the USISL. He played with the team through the 1999 season.

== National team ==
Gillen earned three caps with the U.S. national team in June 1988. His first game came in a June 5, 1988 3–0 loss to Chile. His last was a 1–0 win over Costa Rica on June 14, 1988.

== Non soccer career ==
In 1996, Gillen became an annuity specialist at Merrill Lynch before becoming a high school soccer coach in 2002.

== Coaching ==
Following his graduation from Penn State, Gillen remained at the school as an assistant coach for the 1990 collegiate season. He was a volunteer assistant coach with James Madison while he was working on his master's degree. He returned to as an assistant coach in August 1993 and held that position until he signed with the MetroStars in 1996. He was also an assistant at Maryland University and Syracuse University. In 2002, Gillen became the girls' head coach at Toms River High School North in New Jersey. He later returned to coach the boys' team at his alma mater Toms River High School East, and is also an assistant principal at the school.
