= Cheryl Spector =

American LGBTQ+ activist (1958–2007)

Cheryl Ann Spector
- Born: February 3, 1958; Lakewood, New Jersey, US
- Died: September 4, 2007 (aged 49)
- Known for: Gay activism

Cheryl Ann Spector (February 3, 1958 – September 4, 2007) was a well-known gay, lesbian, bisexual and transgender activist who lived in Arlington, Virginia.

Spector was born in Lakewood Township, New Jersey, and raised in Toms River, New Jersey. She attended Toms River High School North, where she said that she had planned to learn to teach Spanish in college.

She was raised Jewish and later baptized as a Christian, but continued to celebrate both faiths and attended services at the Metropolitan Community Church of Washington and at Bet Mishpachah, both welcoming religious communities for gays.

She attended American University and worked in broadcast television, doing public affairs work for nonprofit organizations before becoming an executive secretary at the Central Intelligence Agency in 2000.

Spector became an activist after her brother Stanley's diagnosis with the HIV virus that causes AIDS and subsequent suicide, in October 1985. She began by volunteering at the 1987 and 1993 Marches on Washington, and served as grand marshal of the D.C. Gay Pride Parade in 1998.

She co-founded the group Oppression Under Target in the late 1980s. The group distributes safe-sex kits to women. In 1990, she worked with ACT-UP to prevent the spread of HIV through infected drug needles.

She served on the board of directors of the Rainbow History Project and was involved in a number of Washington, D.C.-area organizations, including Queer Nation, the Lesbian Avengers, Arlington Gay and Lesbian Alliance, Capital Pride, the Mautner Project, the Max Robinson Center of the Whitman-Walker Clinic, the Metropolitan Community Church of Washington, Bet Mishpachah, the Human Rights Campaign, Servicemembers Legal Defense Network and the Reel Affirmations GLBTQ film festival.

In 2004, she was awarded the "Distinguished Service Award" from the Gay and Lesbian Activists Alliance, Inc. (GLAA)

Spector was known for her photography of D.C. gay events and people, including the community's first AIDS candlelight vigil in 1983. Unfortunately, many of her videos and photographs were lost in an apartment fire shortly before her death. She had intended to leave the materials to the Rainbow History Project, which filed for a grant to clean and restore the remaining materials.

Just before her death, Mautner Project, the National Lesbian Health Organization, had planned to honor Spector with their "Unsung Hero Award", which they asked her sister to accept on her behalf.

She died on September 4, 2007, from myeloid leukemia.
