= Sean Cashman =

American baseball coach (born 1987)

Biographical details
- Born: September 9, 1987 (age 39)

Playing career
- 2006: Saint Peter's
- Position: P

Coaching career (HC unless noted)
- 2009: Ocean County College (Asst.)
- 2010–2011: Temple (Asst.)
- 2012: Saint Peter's (Asst.)
- 2013: Saint Peter's
- 2019: AZL Rangers (Asst.)
- 2020: Spokane Indians
- 2024-Present: Central Arizona

Head coaching record
- Overall: MiLB: 0–0 (–) Season Canceled; NCAA: 17–34 (.333)

Sean Cashman (born September 9, 1987) is an American professional baseball coach. He currently serves as the Head Baseball Coach at Central Arizona College, a position he has held since August 2024.

Cashman previously served in the Texas Rangers organization. He was the head coach of the Saint Peter's Peacocks during the 2013 season.

Born in Toms River, New Jersey, Cashman graduated from Toms River High School North.

== College career ==
Cashman was a pitcher for Saint Peter's. After his playing days, he worked as a scout and eventually turned to coaching, serving as an assistant at Ocean County College for one season. He then moved to Temple for two seasons, before landing the top assistant position at Saint Peter's for one season. After serving as recruiting coordinator and pitching coach, he was elevated to the top job. After the 2013 season, Cashman was shot in the leg during an attempted robbery on campus. Cashman was on leave for the 2014 season, during which T. J. Baxter served as acting head coach; Baxter replaced him permanently following the season.

== Head coaching record ==
This table shows Cashman's record as a head coach at the Division I level.

Record table
Season	Team	Overall	Conference	Standing	Postseason
Saint Peter's Peacocks (Metro Atlantic Athletic Conference) (2013)
2013	Saint Peter's	17–34	9–15	T-7th	
Saint Peter's:		17–34	9–15		
Total:		17–34			
National champion Postseason invitational champion Conference regular season champion Conference regular season and conference tournament champion Division regular season champion Division regular season and conference tournament champion Conference tournament champion

== Amateur baseball ==
After leaving St. Peters', Cashman worked in amateur baseball. Among his jobs included serving as a head coach and general manager in the Atlantic Collegiate Baseball League, and two years as a pitching coach in the Perfect Game Collegiate Baseball League. He served as an assistant and third base coach for the Wisconsin Rapids Rafters of the Northwoods League in 2018.

== Professional baseball ==
Prior to the 2019 season, Cashman was hired by the Texas Rangers as a minor league pitching coach. He served as a pitching coach for the 2019 AZL Rangers. Cashman was named the manager of the Spokane Indians prior to the 2020 season.
