= Swift Burch =

American gridiron football player (1969–2025)

Profile
- Position: Defensive lineman

Personal information
- Born: November 20, 1969; Washington, D.C., U.S.
- Died: May 21, 2025 (aged 56)

Career information
- College: Temple

Career history
- 1994–1995: Toronto Argonauts
- 1996: Ottawa Rough Riders
- 1997–2001: Montreal Alouettes

Awards and highlights
- First-team All-East (1991)

Career statistics
- Tackles: 326
- Sacks: 60
- Interceptions: 1

Swift Burch (May 8, 1969 – May 21, 2025) was an American football defensive lineman in the Canadian Football League (CFL). He played for the Toronto Argonauts, Ottawa Rough Riders and Montreal Alouettes.

Burch played college football for the Temple University Owls. He was a captain of the 1991 team and led the team with 11 tackles for a loss. Burch was a second-team All-Big East selection that season.

In 1994, he was the Argonauts nominee for CFL Outstanding Rookie. He recorded four sacks in a single game against the Hamilton Tiger-Cats on August 3, 1995. In 2000, he was an All-East Division honoree while with the Alouettes. He led Montreal in sacks in both 2000 and 2001 with nine each season. Through the 2024 season, Burch's 37 sacks rank fifth on the all-time list for Montreal.

Burch died on May 21, 2025, at the age of 56, after battling rectal cancer for nine years.
