= Zachary Dougherty =

American civic activist, political organizer (born 2001)

Zachary Dougherty (born March 2001) is an American political activist. He is the director of the Robert C. Byrd Center for Congressional History and Education, a national nonpartisan institution affiliated with Shepherd University and a founding member of the Association of Centers for the Study of Congress. Dougherty succeeded founding director and former U.S. House Historian Raymond W. Smock. He previously worked with the League of Women Voters of New Jersey and was a candidate for public office in 2024.

== Early life and education ==
Zachary Dougherty was born March 2001 in the United States. Dougherty began his civic engagement through the scouting program, achieving the rank of Eagle Scout. He graduated from Toms River High School North in 2019.

Dougherty earned a B.A. degree, magna cum laude, in history and political science from Monmouth University in 2023. In 2025, he completed a Master's degree in legislative affairs at the George Washington University's Graduate School of Political Management.

== Activism and career ==
Following the Parkland high school shooting, Dougherty co-founded the New Jersey chapter of March for Our Lives and served as its political director. He organized student demonstrations and lobbying efforts advocating for gun safety reforms at both the federal and state levels. As a teen activist, Dougherty was featured in Scholastic Choices magazine's May 2018 issue, highlighting the national March for Our Lives movement.

At 17, Dougherty was described as "one of the most recognizable and influential political activists in Ocean County" by the Asbury Park Press. In March 2018, he co-authored an op-ed in The New York Times advocating for safer schools and highlighting the political engagement of Generation Z. That same year, Dougherty introduced Governor Phil Murphy at a bill signing event for six gun safety laws and was presented with a signing pen in recognition of his advocacy work.

In 2022, Dougherty led the effort to pass the New Jersey Legislative Youth Council Act, which established an official forum for youth to advise the state legislature on policy.

He also worked as a community organizer for the League of Women Voters of New Jersey, where he lobbied on issues related to the New Jersey Open Public Records Act, state ballot reform, and expanded civics education. Dougherty previously interned in the offices of U.S. Senator Cory Booker and U.S. Representative Andy Kim.

In 2025, Dougherty was appointed Director of the Robert C. Byrd Center for Congressional History and Education, succeeding founding director Raymond W. Smock, who served as the first Historian of the U.S. House of Representatives. The Center is a civic education and research institution focused on the history and role of the U.S. Congress.

=== Political candidacy ===
In 2024, Dougherty was the Democratic nominee for the Ward 2 seat on the Toms River Township Council. The election was held to fill a vacancy created when Councilman Daniel Rodrick was elected mayor. Dougherty was defeated in the general election by Republican William Byrne.

== Recognition ==
Dougherty has been recognized as an emerging young leader in New Jersey politics, appearing on Insider NJ’s annual “Insider 100 Millennials” or “Rising Generations” lists for seven consecutive years (2018–2024). In 2024, Dougherty was awarded the NASS John Lewis Youth Leadership Award as New Jersey's recipient. The award was presented by Tahesha Way, New Jersey's Lieutenant Governor and Secretary of State.
