= Darian Barnes =

American football player (born 1980)

No. 30, 36, 37
- Position: Fullback

Personal information
- Born: February 28, 1980 (age 46); Toms River, New Jersey, U.S.
- Listed height: 6 ft 2 in (1.88 m)
- Listed weight: 240 lb (109 kg)

Career information
- High school: Toms River North
- College: Hampton
- NFL draft: 2002: undrafted

Career history
- New York Giants (2002)*; Tampa Bay Buccaneers (2002–2003); Dallas Cowboys (2004); Miami Dolphins (2005–2006); New York Jets (2007); Buffalo Bills (2008); Detroit Lions (2008); New Orleans Saints (2008); Florida Tuskers (2010)
- * Offseason or practice squad member only

Awards and highlights
- Super Bowl champion (XXXVII)

Career NFL statistics
- Rushing attempts: 5
- Rushing yards: 10
- Receptions: 16
- Receiving yards: 121
- Receiving touchdowns: 1
- Stats at Pro Football Reference

Darian Durrell Barnes (born February 28, 1980) is an American former professional football player who was a fullback in the National Football League (NFL) for the Tampa Bay Buccaneers, Dallas Cowboys, Miami Dolphins, New York Jets, Buffalo Bills, Detroit Lions and New Orleans Saints. He played college football for the Hampton Pirates.

== Early life ==
Barnes attended Toms River High School North. As a senior, he only played in 8 games, registering 148 carries for 1,163 yards and 15 touchdowns. He received second-team All-state by The Star-Ledger and first-team all-county honors at the end of the season.

== College career ==
Barnes accepted a football scholarship from Rutgers University. He did not play in any game as a freshman. He tallied 20 carries for 50 yards as a sophomore. He sat out his junior season until transferring to Hampton University.

As a senior, he appeared in 10 games, posting 27 carries for 93 yards, one touchdown and one reception for 7 yards.

== Professional career ==
=== New York Giants ===
Barnes was signed as an undrafted free agent by the New York Giants after the 2002 NFL draft on July 25. He was waived on September 1.

=== Tampa Bay Buccaneers ===
On September 2, 2002, he was claimed off waivers by the Tampa Bay Buccaneers. He appeared in six games and was declared inactive in ten contests, playing mainly on special teams (three tackles) and being a part of the Super Bowl XXXVII winning team.

In 2003, he appeared in 14 games, before being placed on the injured reserve list on December 16, with a sprained left AC joint. He finished with 7 special teams tackles.

On April 25, 2004, he was traded along with a seventh round pick (#216-Patrick Crayton) to the Dallas Cowboys in exchange for a seventh round draft choice (#206-Mark Jones).

=== Dallas Cowboys ===
In 2004, he was acquired to complement Richie Anderson and be the team's blocking fullback for rookie running back Julius Jones. During the season, he recorded 10 receptions for 59 yards, including his only career touchdown, a 5-yard reception, against the Chicago Bears. On August 24, 2005, he was waived injured (sprained ankle) and replaced with second-year player Lousaka Polite.

=== Miami Dolphins ===
On October 24, 2005, he signed as a free agent with the Miami Dolphins to be the team's blocking fullback for running backs Ronnie Brown and Ricky Williams. In 2006, he appeared in 16 games (6 starts), making 3 receptions for 22 yards.

=== New York Jets ===
On March 8, 2007, he was signed by the New York Jets to be the fullback for Thomas Jones, who was also his teammate with the Tampa Bay Buccaneers. He appeared in 5 games (3 starts) and was declared inactive in 4 contests. He was released on November 29.

=== Buffalo Bills ===
On January 17, 2008, the Buffalo Bills signed him as the first move for both Turk Schonert as offensive coordinator and Russ Brandon as Vice President. This marked the return of the fullback to the Bills' offensive system. He was released four games into the season on September 30, after suffering a sprained right foot against the Oakland Raiders on September 21. The Bills signed fullback Corey McIntyre to take his place on the roster.

=== Detroit Lions ===
On October 28, 2008, Barnes was signed by the Detroit Lions to replace injured rookie fullback Jerome Felton. On November 11, he was released after the team re-signed running back Aveion Cason.

=== New Orleans Saints ===
On November 18, 2008, he was signed by the New Orleans Saints to replace injured fullback Mike Karney, reuniting with Sean Payton who was his offensive coordinator with the Cowboys. He was waived on December 21. He was re-signed to a future contract following the end of the season. He was released on July 23, 2009.

== Personal life ==
Barnes created a comic book called "National Triumph League" along with a partner, which sees professional athletes blessed with superhuman talent. Barnes and his wife, Rebecca, have four daughters, Damara, Darren, Daylin and Draya.

In 2013, Barnes returned to his alma mater Toms River North as an assistant coach. In 2014, he was named the interim head coach at Colts Neck High School. In January 2015, he was promoted to head coach permanently. He resigned after the 2017 season, finishing with an 8-22 record.

In June 2020, he competed on the 20th season of the Food Network show Worst Cooks in America.
