= Lamont Green =

American football player (1976–2025)

No. 45
- Position: Linebacker

Personal information
- Born: July 10, 1976; Miami, Florida, U.S.
- Died: July 14, 2025 (aged 49)
- Listed height: 6 ft 3 in (1.91 m)
- Listed weight: 230 lb (104 kg)

Career information
- High school: Miami Southridge (Miami, Florida)
- College: Florida State
- NFL draft: 1999: undrafted

Career history
- Atlanta Falcons (1999); Carolina Panthers (1999-2000); Berlin Thunder (2000)

Awards and highlights
- First-team All-ACC (1998)
- Stats at Pro Football Reference

Lamont Green (July 10, 1976 – July 14, 2025) was an American professional football player who briefly played as a linebacker for the Atlanta Falcons of the National Football League (NFL) in 1999. He was later assigned to the NFL Europe's Berlin Thunder before retiring due to injuries. Green played college football for the Florida State Seminoles, earning all-conference honors in 1998. He never lived up to the expectations stemming from his exceptional high school career. Considered an "underachiever" in college, Green was not selected in the 1999 NFL draft.

== Early life ==
A Miami, Florida native, Green attended Miami Southridge High School, where he was a three time 5A all-state selection and played on two state championship teams (1991 and 1993). In his senior season in 1993, he averaged nine tackles per game for a total of 135 on the year, while most offenses shied away from him. With an offensive backfield featuring brothers Troy and Darren Davis at halfbacks as well as Sedrick Irvin at fullback, Miami Southridge rushed for 262.4 yards per game (356.27 ypg total offense). The Spartans won the Class 5A state championship in a 69–36 rout over Bradenton Manatee, to finish the season 15–0 and on the #5 rank of the USA Today poll. Green was named an All-American and Defensive Player of the Year by USA Today. He also was Florida's Gatorade Player of the Year.

Green participated in the Florida-Georgia All-Star Game and was named Florida's Most Valuable Player after recording a team high eight tackles, including two stops for a total loss of 23 yards, and broke up a pass. Considered the No. 1 high school football recruit in the nation in 1994, Green chose Florida State over Southern California, Michigan, Alabama, Penn State, and Miami (FL).

== College career ==
After redshirting his initial year at Florida State University, Green appeared mostly on special teams in his freshman season in 1995, and recorded 28 tackles (including 17 unassisted) on the season. He also caused a fumble and recovered it in the Seminoles' 72–13 win over Wake Forest. Green saw his role on the team increased in his sophomore year, as he registered 44 tackles (26 solo) as back-up linebackers. He also had six tackles-for-loss and three quarterback sacks (two of them against Maryland). In his first career start against Georgia Tech, Green stepped in front of a screen pass and ran the interception back for 56 yards and a touchdown.

Taking over as starting outside linebacker in his junior year, Green ranked third on the team for tackles with 85, behind Sam Cowart (116) and Daryl Bush (97). He also had six tackles-for-loss. Two of those, plus a quarterback sack, came in the 14–7 win over Southern California, the first ever game between the two programs. Against North Carolina State, Green recorded his only interception of the season. In his senior year, he was selected as team captain and played an integral part in the team's run for the National Championship in the 1999 Fiesta Bowl. He ranked first on the team in tackles with 73, including 48 unassisted and ten for a loss of yardage.

== Professional career ==
Pre-draft measurables
Height	Weight	40-yard dash	10-yard split	20-yard split	20-yard shuttle	Vertical jump	Broad jump	Bench press
6 ft 3 in (1.91 m)	226 lb (103 kg)	4.76 s	1.68 s	2.70 s	4.48 s	33.0 in (0.84 m)	9 ft 6 in (2.90 m)	18 reps

Despite being labeled an “underachiever” and criticized for “lackluster play,” Green was ranked as the No. 4 outside linebacker prospect in the 1999 NFL draft, behind Rahim Abdullah, Gary Stills, and Mike Peterson. However, he was not selected by any team. Eventually, he was signed by the Atlanta Falcons, playing one game for them in 1999. Green spent the 2000 season on the reserve list of the Carolina Panthers, and was briefly assigned to the Berlin Thunder of the NFL Europe. In a game against the Scottish Claymores, he viciously tackled receiver Aaron Stecker, who afterwards promised him to “getting [him] back.” Stecker and teammate Jason Gamble placed a bounty on injuring Green, but never successfully did.

== Post-playing career ==
Green received his bachelor's degree from Florida State in Criminology & Criminal Justice in 2002. He earned his master's degree in Education from Nova Southeastern University in 2007.

Green coached high school football at South Miami Senior High School and Florida Christian School. In June 2023, Green became the defensive coordinator at Miami Southridge Senior High School. In 2008, Green was named Academic Counselor for the Florida State Seminoles football team.

Green's son, Lamont Green Jr., is a defensive lineman at Florida State.

Green died on July 14, 2025, at age 49.
