= Julio M. Fuentes =

American judge (born 1946)

Julio Fuentes

Senior Judge of the United States Court of Appeals for the Third Circuit
- Incumbent
- Assumed office July 18, 2016

Judge of the United States Court of Appeals for the Third Circuit
- In office March 9, 2000 – July 18, 2016
- Appointed by: Bill Clinton
- Preceded by: Robert Cowen
- Succeeded by: Paul Matey

Personal details
- Born: Julio Manuel Fuentes; February 16, 1946 (age 80) Humacao, Puerto Rico
- Education: Southern Illinois University (BA); New York University (MA); University at Buffalo (JD); Rutgers University, Newark (MA)

Julio Manuel Fuentes (born February 16, 1946) is a Senior United States circuit judge of the United States Court of Appeals for the Third Circuit. Fuentes is the first Hispanic judge to serve on the Third Circuit.

== Early life and education ==
Fuentes was born on February 16, 1946, in Humacao, Puerto Rico; he moved with his family from Puerto Rico to New York in 1950, according to a May 16, 2000, article in the Newark Star-Ledger. Fuentes' family settled in the South Bronx area of The Bronx, New York and moved to New Jersey in 1955. Fuentes grew up in Toms River, New Jersey and graduated from Toms River High School (now Toms River High School South) in 1964, where he played football and wrestled.

Fuentes earned a Bachelor of Arts degree in 1971 from Southern Illinois University. His time at SIU was interrupted by a stint in the United States Army, from 1966 through 1969. After completing the United States Army Airborne School, the Ranger School and the Army Officer Candidate School in Fort Benning, Georgia, Fuentes served in the Army's Military Police and with the 8th Special Forces Group in Fort Gulick, Panama. He was honorably discharged with the rank of First Lieutenant. Fuentes also earned a Master of Arts degree in Latin American Studies from New York University in 1972. He then earned a Juris Doctor from the University at Buffalo Law School in 1975, and another Master of Arts degree in Liberal Studies from Rutgers University in 1993. In 2006, he was inducted into the National Wrestling Hall of Fame, in Stillwater, Oklahoma.

== Career ==
Fuentes worked as a lawyer in private practice from 1975 until 1981 and worked as a judge in the Newark Municipal Court from 1979 until 1987. He then served as a judge in New Jersey Superior Court in Essex County from 1987 until being confirmed to the Third Circuit in 2000.

=== Federal judicial service ===
Fuentes' name originally had been put forth for a District Court opening by then-Senator Robert Torricelli of New Jersey. President Bill Clinton's staff interviewed Fuentes and instead opted to bring forth Fuentes' name as a nominee at the court of appeals level. Clinton nominated Fuentes to the United States Court of Appeals for the Third Circuit seat on March 8, 1999. The United States Senate Judiciary Committee approved Fuentes' nomination on March 2, 2000, and the United States Senate confirmed Fuentes by a 93–0 vote on March 7, 2000. Fuentes received his commission on March 9, 2000, and was sworn in on May 15, 2000. "I intend to honor this trust every day," Fuentes told a standing ovation as he was sworn in, according to a May 16, 2000, article in the Newark Star-Ledger. He assumed senior status on July 18, 2016.

== Personal life ==
During high school, Fuentes worked as a supermarket stock clerk and lifeguard, and "ha[s] vague memories of having a paper route."

In 2002, he received a Distinguished Alumni Award from the University at Buffalo School of Law and the 2024 Edwin F. Jaeckle Award.

Fuentes resides in New Jersey, where he maintains chambers in Newark.

== Notable former clerks ==
- Aditi Bagchi, professor of law at Fordham University Law School.
- Mark Colón, nominee for the position of assistant secretary for community planning and development.
- Stephen Ehrlich, Deputy Solicitor General of New Jersey.
- John Infranca, Professor of Law and Director of Faculty Scholarship & Research at Suffolk University Law School.
- Clay H. Kaminsky, United States magistrate judge for the United States District Court for the Eastern District of New York.
- Eli Northrup, elected in 2026 as a member the New York State Assembly for the 69th district.
- Jennifer Pacella, assistant professor in the business law and ethics at the Kelley School of Business of Indiana University.
- Myrna Pérez, judge of the United States Court of Appeals for the Second Circuit.
- Eric Ruben, assistant professor of law at SMU Dedman School of Law.
- Kerri L. Stone, associate professor at FIU College of Law.
- Jennifer P. Wilson, judge of the United States District Court for the Middle District of Pennsylvania.

== See also ==
- List of first minority male lawyers and judges in the United States
- List of Hispanic and Latino American jurists
- List of Puerto Ricans

Legal offices
Preceded by Robert Cowen	Judge of the United States Court of Appeals for the Third Circuit; 2000–2016	Succeeded by Paul Matey
