= 1990 All-East football team =

American college football all-star team

The 1990 All-East football team consists of American football players chosen by the Associated Press as the best players at each position among the Eastern colleges and universities during the 1990 NCAA Division I-A football season.

== Offense ==
=== Quarterback ===
- Matt Baker, Temple (AP-1)
- Alex Van Pelt, Pittsburgh (AP-2)

=== Running backs ===
- Mike Mayweather, Army (AP-1)
- David Walker, Syracuse (AP-1)
- Tekay Dorsey, Rutgers (AP-2)
- Rico Tyler, West Virginia (AP-2)

=== Wide receivers ===
- Rob Carpenter, Syracuse (AP-1)
- Rich Drayton, Temple (AP-1)
- Olanda Truitt, Pittsburgh (AP-2)
- Jerry Dawson, Navy (AP-2)

=== Tight end ===
- Mark Chmura, Boston College (AP-1)
- Dave Berghult, Navy (AP-2)

=== Linemen ===
- John Flannery, Syracuse (AP-1)
- Bill Speier, Army (AP-1)
- Dale Wolfley, West Virginia (AP-1)
- Dick Beck, Temple (AP-1)
- Matt McCartin, Penn State (AP-1)
- Scott Miller, Pittsburgh (AP-2)
- Allen Mitchell, Rutgers (AP-2)
- Greg Hlatky, Navy (AP-2)
- Turnell Sims, Syracuse (AP-2)
- John Ray, West Virginia (AP-2)

=== Placekicker ===
- Patmon Malcom, Army (AP-1)
- Bob Wright, Temple (AP-2)

=== Return specialist ===
- Ron Allen, Rutgers (AP-1)
- Kevin McCoy, Temple (AP-2)

== Defense ==
=== Linemen ===
- Frank Giannetti, Penn State (AP-1)
- Andy Kirkland, Navy (AP-1)
- Kenyatta Rush, Temple (AP-1)
- Keith Hamilton, Pitt (AP-1)
- Kevin Mitchell, Syracuse (AP-2)
- Scott Miller, Rutgers (AP-2)
- Jim Gray, West Virginia (AP-2)

=== Linebackers ===
- Matt Kelley, Boston College (AP-1)
- Mark D'Onofrio, Penn State (AP-1)
- Ricardo McDonald, Pittsburgh (AP-1)
- Steve Grant, West Virginia (AP-2)
- Theron Ellis, West Virginia (AP-2)
- Anthony Noto, Army (AP-2)
- Kevin Pearson, Boston College (AP-2)

=== Defensive backs ===
- Darren Perry, Penn State (AP-1)
- Rob Thomson, Syracuse (AP-1)
- Willie Thomas, Penn State (AP-1)
- Mike McElrath, Army (AP-1)
- Louis Riddick, Pittsburgh (AP-2)
- Leonard Humphries, Penn State (AP-2)
- Ed Givens, Army (AP-2)
- Dave Johnson, Boston College (AP-2)

=== Punter ===
- Brian Greenfield, Pittsburgh (AP-1)
- Greg Hertzog, West Virginia (AP-2)

== Key ==
- AP = Associated Press

== See also ==
- 1990 College Football All-America Team
