= JP Flavin =

American runner

Personal information
- Nationality: American
- Born: July 31, 1998 (age 27)
- Home town: Toms River, New Jersey, U.S.
- Education: North Carolina State University '21 BS Accounting
- Height: 5 ft 11 in (180 cm)

Sport
- Country: United States
- Sport: Men's athletics
- Event: Marathon
- Club: Brooks Sports
- Team: Formerly Toms River High School North; Dayton Flyers; NC State Wolfpack; Hanson Brooks Running
- Turned pro: 2021
- Coached by: Kevin Hanson
Medal record
Men's athletics
Representing the United States
World Marathon Majors

John "J.P." Flavin (born July 31, 1998) is an American long-distance runner. Flavin is ranked 23rd in the United States men's marathon in 2025. He won the December 2025 The Marathon Project in Chandler, Arizona in a personal best time of 2:09:18.

Raised in Toms River, New Jersey, Flavin competed in cross country at Toms River High School North and was named to the all-state second team in 2015.

== Professional ==
Flavin qualified for the 2024 United States Olympic trials (marathon) in Orlando, Florida during his debut at the 2022 Chicago Marathon where he placed 26th with a finishing time of 2:14:55.

He placed 17th in 2:13:27 at the 2023 Boston Marathon.

He placed 21st in 2:12:34 at the 2024 Chicago Marathon.

He placed 16th in 2:10:50 at the 2025 Boston Marathon. He won the 49th annual 10K Bellin Run on June 14, 2025, in Green Bay, Wis. He placed 13th in 59:28 at the U.S. 20 km Championships in New Haven, Connecticut Monday morning on September 1, 2025. He won the December 2025 The Marathon Project in Chandler, Arizona in a personal best time of 2:09:18.

== NCAA ==
Flavin is a two-time Atlantic 10 Conference All-Conference honoree.

Representing North Carolina State University '19 - '21 University of Dayton '16 - '18
| Championship | Venue | Position | Event | Time |
Cross Country Championships
| 2021 NCAA Division I cross country championships | Tallahassee, Florida | 50th | 10 km | 29:38.7 |
| 2021 Atlantic Coast Conference cross country championships | South Bend, Indiana | 20th | 8 km | 24:14.8 |
| 2020 NCAA Division I cross country championships | Stillwater, Oklahoma | DNF | 10 km | DNF |
| 2020 Atlantic Coast Conference cross country championships | North Carolina State University; Cary, North Carolina | 15th | 8 km | 23:34.2 |
| 2018 Atlantic 10 Conference cross country championships | Mechanicsville, Virginia | 5th | 8 km | 24:53.3 |
| 2017 Atlantic 10 Conference cross country championships | Fairfax, Virginia | 4th | 8 km | 25:23.6 |
| 2016 Atlantic 10 Conference cross country championships | Mechanicsville, Virginia | 30th | 8 km | 25:37.1 |
Track Championships
| 2021 NCAA Division I Outdoor Track and Field Championships | University of North Florida | 56th | 10,000m | 30:08.94 |
| 2021 Atlantic Coast Conference Outdoor Track and Field Championships | Raleigh, North Carolina | 14th | 5000m | 13:57.66 |
| 2019 NCAA Division I Outdoor Track and Field Championships | University of North Florida | 34th | 10,000m | 29:24.16 |
| 2019 Atlantic Coast Conference Outdoor Track and Field Championships | Charlottesville, Virginia | 7th | 5000m | 14:08.34 |
| 2019 Atlantic Coast Conference Indoor Track and Field Championships | Blacksburg, Virginia | 19th | 5000m | 14:34.19 |

== Early life ==
| Year | Cross Country class 3 state championship | Indoor Track and Field class 4 state championship | Outdoor Track and Field class 4 state championship |
New Balance Nationals Indoor
| 2015–16 | | DMR 4000m - [1200-400-800-1600] 10:31.39; Justin Farley, Bryce Watts, Noah Reilly, John Flavin; 18th place | |
Representing Toms River High School North
| 2015–16 | 16:17.9; 8th place | 3200 m 9:23.04; 3rd place | 3200 m 9:29.46; 6th |
| 2015–16 | 16:17.9; 8th place | 3200 m 9:23.04; 3rd place | 4 × 800 m Anthony Vela, Javid Ridgeway, Noah Reilly, John Flavin; 8:07.76; 13th place |
| 2014–15 | 16:17.0; 9th place | DNQ | DNQ |
| 2013–14 | 16:58.0; 33rd place | DNQ | DNQ |
| 2012–13 | DNQ | DNQ | DNQ |

1600 & 3200m PB
| 2015–16 | 4:22.10 & 9:23.04 |
| 2014–15 | 4:27.02 & 9:29.21 |
| 2013–14 | 4:39.69 & 9:52.47 |
| 2012–13 | 4:57.09 & 10:43.90 |
