= Rob Carpenter (wide receiver) =

American football player (born 1968)

No. 81, 82, 85
- Position: Wide receiver

Personal information
- Born: August 1, 1968 (age 58); Amityville, New York, U.S.
- Listed height: 6 ft 2 in (1.88 m)
- Listed weight: 190 lb (86 kg)

Career information
- High school: Amityville Memorial
- College: Notre Dame; Syracuse
- NFL draft: 1991: 4th round, 109th overall pick

Career history
- Cincinnati Bengals (1991)*; New England Patriots (1991); New York Jets (1992–1994); Winnipeg Blue Bombers (1995); Philadelphia Eagles (1995); Green Bay Packers (1996)
- * Offseason or practice squad member only

Awards and highlights
- Super Bowl champion (XXXI); First-team All-East (1990)

Career NFL statistics
- Receptions: 51
- Receiving yards: 607
- Receiving touchdowns: 1
- Stats at Pro Football Reference

Rob Carpenter (born August 1, 1968) is an American former professional football player who was a wide receiver for the New England Patriots, New York Jets and Philadelphia Eagles of the National Football League (NFL). He played college football for the Notre Dame Fighting Irish and Syracuse Orangemen before being selected by the Cincinnati Bengals in the fourth round of the 1991 NFL draft. He was one of a relatively small class of underclassmen, headlined by Ragib "Rocket" Ismail, to be approved in the NFL's second class of players allowed to declare themselves eligible for the draft despite remaining amateur eligibility. In addition to Carpenter, other headliners among the underclassmen were Herman Moore, Todd Marinovich and Jon Vaughn (who also played for the 1991 Patriots).

The 1995 Eagles, coached by Ray Rhodes, were the only playoff team that he played for. They compiled a 10-6 record and won their 1995 Wild Card Game against the Detroit Lions, where Carpenter caught a Hail Mary pass before halftime, however the Eagles fell to the eventual Super Bowl XXX champion Dallas Cowboys. Carpenter was third (Fred Barnett & Calvin Williams) in receptions and yardage among wide receivers for the Eagles. He and Williams were the only receivers to play all 16 regular season games for the Eagles that year. He and Kelvin Martin shared the punt return duties for the 1995 Eagles. He had two receptions in each playoff game (including the aforementioned hail mary touchdown in the first).

He ranks among the all-time leaders in Syracuse University receptions in most statistics despite only playing for them for two seasons. He ranks fifth in career yards (1656), ninth in touchdowns (10), ninth in receptions (93), seventh in yards/catch (17.8) and second in yards/game (72.0). The only others in the top 10 on all five of these lists are Marvin Harrison, Rob Moore and Mike Siano.
