= Paul Matey =

American judge (born 1971)

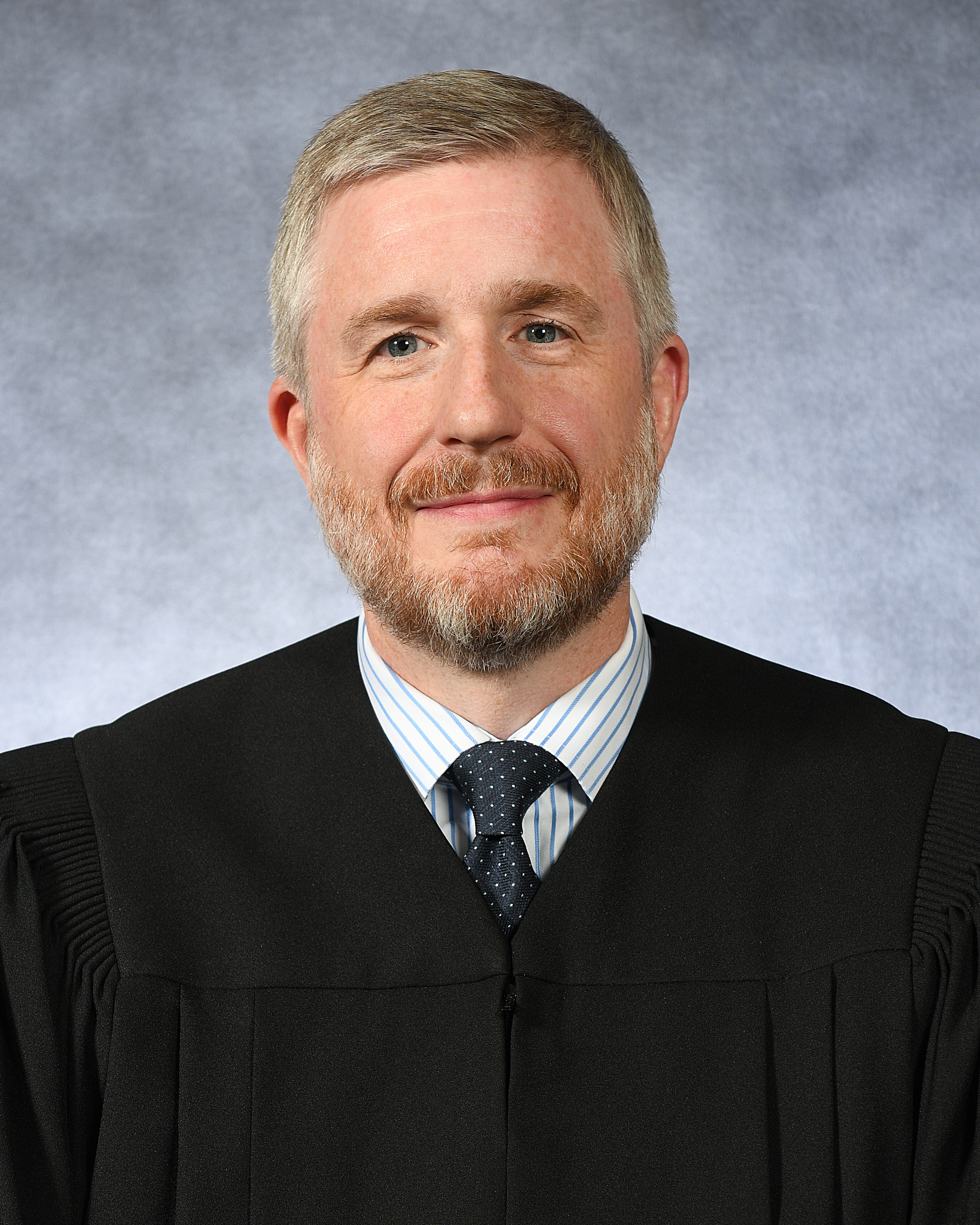
- Official portrait, 2019

Judge of the United States Court of Appeals for the Third Circuit
- Incumbent
- Assumed office March 18, 2019
- Appointed by: Donald Trump
- Preceded by: Julio M. Fuentes

Personal details
- Born: Paul Brian Matey; March 29, 1971 (age 55) Edison, New Jersey, U.S.
- Party: Republican
- Education: University of Scranton (BA); Seton Hall University (JD)

Paul Brian Matey (born March 29, 1971) is an American jurist, lecturer, and attorney who serves as a U.S. Circuit judge on the U.S. Court of Appeals for the Third Circuit. Prior to Matey's judicial service, he was a partner in the White Collar Criminal Defense and Litigation practice groups at the law firm of Lowenstein Sandler LLP. He was previously senior vice president, secretary, and general counsel at University Hospital in Newark, New Jersey, deputy chief counsel to New Jersey Governor Chris Christie, and an Assistant U.S. Attorney in the U.S. Attorney's Office for the District of New Jersey.

== Early life and education ==
Matey was born in Edison, New Jersey and raised in Rahway, New Jersey. He graduated from St. Thomas Aquinas High School in 1989, earned his Bachelor of Arts from the University of Scranton in 1993, and his Juris Doctor, summa cum laude, from Seton Hall University School of Law in 2001, where he served as editor-in-chief of the Seton Hall Law Review.

== Legal career ==
After graduating from law school, Matey served as a law clerk to Judge John C. Lifland of the U.S. District Court for the District of New Jersey from 2001 to 2002 and to Judge Robert Cowen of the U.S. Court of Appeals for the Third Circuit from 2002 to 2003. He spent two years as a litigation associate at the Washington, D.C., law firm Kellogg, Hansen, Todd, Figel & Frederick, where he worked alongside Neil M. Gorsuch, future Associate Justice of the U.S. Supreme Court, who at the time was a partner at the firm. Matey then worked as an Assistant U.S. Attorney in the U.S. Attorney's Office for the District of New Jersey, where he prosecuted matters including complex white-collar crimes, health care fraud, securities fraud, and child protection actions. He received the Director's Award for Superior Performance from the United States Department of Justice.

From 2010 to 2015, Matey served as senior counsel and then deputy chief counsel to New Jersey Governor Chris Christie. He later served as senior vice president, secretary, and general counsel at University Hospital in Newark from 2015 until 2018, when he joined the law firm Lowenstein Sandler LLP as a partner in the firm's litigation, regulatory counseling, and white collar defense practices.

== Federal judicial service ==
=== Nomination ===
In 2017, New Jersey Governor Chris Christie recommended to the Trump Administration that Matey be nominated to a U.S. circuit judge seat. On April 10, 2018, President Donald Trump announced his intent to nominate Matey to serve as a United States Circuit Judge of the United States Court of Appeals for the Third Circuit. He was nominated to the seat vacated by Judge Julio M. Fuentes, who assumed senior status on July 18, 2016. On April 12, 2018, his nomination was sent to the Senate. On November 13, 2018, a hearing on his nomination was held before the Senate Judiciary Committee. On January 3, 2019, his nomination was returned to the President under Rule XXXI, Paragraph 6 of the Standing Rules of the U.S. Senate. On January 23, 2019, President Trump announced his intent to renominate Matey for a federal judgeship. His nomination was sent to the Senate later that day. On February 7, 2019, his nomination was reported out of committee by a 12–10 vote. On March 11, 2019, the Senate invoked cloture on his nomination by a 50–44 vote. On March 12, 2019, his nomination was confirmed by a 54–45 vote. He received his judicial commission on March 18, 2019.

=== Notable opinions, cases, and jurisprudence ===
Matey's jurisprudence is notable among federal judges for its embrace of the classical legal tradition and common good constitutionalism. His opinions reflect a focus on natural rights and natural law, and how they inform and undergird written rights. Matey's opinions have consistently emphasized the importance of natural rights such as self-defense and free speech, as well as natural law principles supporting the United States' inherent authority to control its borders.

==== Immigration and border control ====
In Qatanani v. Attorney General, Matey dissented from the majority's holding that Mohammad Qatanani can become a lawful permanent resident, despite Qatanani's association with Hamas supporters and his calls for a "new intifada." Invoking Ancient Roman legal principles and Adrian Vermeule's Common Good Constitutionalism, Matey conceptualized the Immigration & Nationality Act as a "communal directive," as well as "the lawmaker's reasoned ordination for the common good expressed in text," and he explained that such "reasoned choice arise against, and from, the natural law, [so] we look to those principles to ascertain the meaning and will of the lawmaking body." Matey also cited natural law principles providing that "a sovereign has complete discretion to determine who it deems worthy to enter all parts of its political community." Therefore, he explained, "an alien's license to remain within our Nation is always a matter of grace, not right." He further urged that the First Amendment's use of the term "the people" is best understood to refer, not to unauthorized aliens, but "to a class of persons who are part of a national community or who have otherwise developed sufficient connections with this country to be considered part of that community." He also contended that "an individual has a right to the protection of government and its laws only by virtue of his allegiance."

In Pino-Porras v. Attorney General, Matey dissented from a majority opinion remanding a case for a new hearing before an immigration judge to review an asylum officer's finding that the petitioner did not have a reasonable fear of persecution or torture. The majority held that the immigration judge "abused her discretion by failing to give [the petitioner] a reasonable opportunity to have his counsel participate in the hearing." In dissent, Matey wrote that the petitioner "was not entitled to counsel" because "reasonable-fear hearings are not removal proceedings, leaving no basis for an allowance of counsel."

In Robles Corcuera v. Attorney General, Matey dissented from an order remanding an immigration matter to the Board of Immigration Appeals, explaining that "as an alien paroled into our Nation, the Fifth Amendment cannot ground [the petitioner's claims]. And even if [the petitioner] could invoke notions of due process, no violation occurred because Congress defined, and the Executive provided, the process thought due: an opportunity to retain counsel, not a guaranteed right to representation."

In Carneiro v. Attorney General, Matey wrote separately to critique what he considers a near limitless meaning of "particular social group" which has led to a significant expansion in who qualifies as a refugee for purposes of admission into the United States. Analyzing the origin of the term, Matey concluded that "particular social group refers to prosecution by a foreign sovereign against a political minority based on political disagreements." The term was not "intended to open the immigration floodgates to everyone in the world who is oppressed."

In Dodyuk v. Attorney General, Matey wrote an opinion holding that an immigration judge may consider an illegal alien's involvement in a stabbing in ruling on his adjustment of status, despite the criminal charging documents having been expunged.

==== Executive branch appointments ====
In United States v. Giraud, the U.S. Court of Appeals for the Third Circuit, in a decision by a three-judge panel which did not include Matey, affirmed a lower court ruling disqualifying Alina Habba from serving as the U.S. Attorney for the District of New Jersey. In a subsequent en banc petition to have the case's appeal be heard by all the active judges of the court, the full Third Circuit declined to reconsider the panel's decision, but Matey voted to rehear the decision en banc.

==== Religion ====
In McDowell v. Bayhealth Medical Center, Matey dissented from the majority's holding affirming that Bayhealth did not discriminate against their employees by denying them COVID-19 vaccine exemptions. Matey's opinion criticized the mainstream conception of "religious liberty" as prioritizing "inwardness, solipsism, and absolute autonomy." Relying on the writings of Thomas Aquinas, Cicero, and James Madison, he argued that the embrace of absolute individual autonomy "does not follow the traditional understanding of religion which consists in offering service and ceremonial rites to a superior nature that men call divine." Matey also observed, relying on natural law theorist Hadley Arkes, that "[o]nly recently have courts broadened the definition of 'religion' to encompass more than formal doctrines of theology, a move that would push on eventually to a legal understanding of religion that was virtually indistinguishable from private beliefs of any kind." Matey concluded that such a "change in course, and its deviation from classical principles, deserves a deeper examination in a suitable case."

In Clark v. Governor of New Jersey, Matey dissented from the majority's holding that the in-person religious gathering limits put into place but later relaxed by New Jersey Governor Phil Murphy did not present a justiciable controversy. Matey wrote that the governor and the state's attorney general appeared to "consider the First Amendment subordinate to their emergency powers." Matey criticized the majority for leaving New Jersey's residents in limbo, as they "still do not know whether the First Amendment protects their religious obligations and faith tenets, even though at the founding, the right to religious liberty was universally said to be an unalienable right." Matey called this a "chilling prospect" because New Jersey "treats religious exercise worse" than secular activities such as liquor shopping.

==== Second Amendment ====
In Range v. Attorney General, Matey's en banc concurrence followed the "well-established practice of consulting classical authorities discussing natural law to inform the determination of written rights." He relied on dozens of founding and pre-founding era sources, including Thomas Aquinas, John Henry Newman, William Blackstone, Hugo Grotius, Samuel Pufendorf, and Cicero, tracing the natural right to self-defense over the course of thousands of years, ultimately explaining how the Founders inherited this tradition and preserved it in the Second Amendment. According to Adrian Vermeule, Ralph S. Tyler Professor of Constitutional Law at Harvard Law School, Matey's opinion "takes Second Amendment doctrine in an unmistakably classical direction by understanding history and tradition not as a set of empirical data points, but as a set of reasoned principles of constitutional governance." Vermeule further wrote that Matey's citations to "both James Wilson and St. Thomas Aquinas" represent "the best style of 18th and 19th century American judicial writing, which frequently drew upon both Anglo-American and continental sources, seeing both as party of a larger continuous tradition." Jamie McWilliam of the James Wilson Institute observed that the opinion "examined our historical laws as an extension of the Western tradition the Founders inherited," a tradition grounded in "deeper natural law principles."

In Smith & Wesson Brands v. Attorney General of the State of New Jersey, Matey concurred in the court's decision vacating the dismissal of Smith & Wesson's federal civil rights complaint against New Jersey. He explained that New Jersey's "less-than-forthcoming approach to [this] litigation suggests that careful review of New Jersey's entire investigation is warranted," and warned that the "whole point" of the investigation may be to infringe upon "the right to self-defense" which derives "from the natural right to life."

In Association of NJ Rifle and Pistol Clubs v. Attorney General of the State of New Jersey, Matey dissented from the majority's holding that New Jersey's ban of magazines holding more than ten rounds of ammunition did not violate the Second Amendment. Surveying American history, Matey wrote there is not a "longstanding tradition of regulating magazine as 'dangerous and unusual.'" Matey further called for applying a "text, history, and tradition" test to the Second Amendment, rather than an "interest-balancing test." His view was ultimately supported by the U.S. Supreme Court's landmark decision in New York State Rifle & Pistol Association v. Bruen, which rejected a tiers-of-scrutiny approach to the Second Amendment in favor of a historical analysis.

==== Freedom of thought ====
In Jorjani v. New Jersey Institute of Technology, Matey authored the panel opinion reversing a District Court's conclusion that NJIT did not violate Jason Jorjani's First Amendment rights when it declined to renew his contract because of comments he made as a private citizen on a matter of public concern that did not result in any disruption to NJIT's educational mission. The court's holding ensured universities may not "discipline professors, students, and staff any time their speech might cause offense."

In FDRLST Media v. National Labor Relations Board, Matey concurred in the court's judgment holding that a satirical tweet did not rise to the level of a labor violation, recognizing freedom of opinion as an "inalienable natural right." However, Matey would have limited the ability to bring an unfair labor complaint to those "aggrieved" by an alleged unfair labor practice, in contrast to the majority's holding that anyone may bring such a charge.

==== Section 230 immunity ====
In Anderson v. TikTok, Inc., Matey wrote a separate opinion concurring in the panel's decision reinstating certain claims brought against TikTok by the estate of a young girl who died in an accident while attempting to complete the "Blackout Challenge." In his opinion, Matey rejected TikTok's position that it was immune from such suits under Section 230, and he explained that the position reflected "casual indifference to the death of a ten-year-old girl," while warning that the position "has become popular among a host of purveyors of pornography, self-mutilation, and exploitation." Analogizing to Augustine of Hippo's Confessions, he further stated that TikTok's argument "smuggles constitutional conceptions of a 'free trade in ideas' into a digital 'cauldron of illicit loves' that leap and boil with no oversight, no accountability, no remedy." Matey also criticized existing decisions which made it so that "section 230 rides in to rescue corporations from virtually any claim loosely related to content posted by a third party, no matter the cause of action and whatever the provider's actions." He concluded saying that, while the "marketplace of ideas, such as it now is, may reward TikTok's pursuit of profit above all other values," and while a company "may decide to curate the content it serves up to children to emphasize the lowest virtues, the basest tastes," it "cannot claim immunity that Congress did not provide."

==== Election law ====
In Eakin v. Adams County Board of Elections, Matey joined opinions by Judges Peter Phipps and Emil J. Bove III dissenting from the denial of an en banc rehearing petition. The original three-judge majority (which did not include Matey) had declared Pennsylvania's date requirement for mail-in ballots unconstitutional, and Matey voted to rehear that decision en banc.

==== Legality of the cannabis industry ====
In Apical Biotek, LLC v. Maitri Holdings, LLC, Matey concurred in the panel's decision remanding a lawsuit between two companies in the cannabis industry to consider whether the companies’ contracts involved conduct that violated federal law. In his opinion, Matey emphasized that the federal Controlled Substances Act "makes manufacturing, distributing, or dispensing marijuana a federal crime," and "also makes conspiring to manufacture, distribute, or dispense marijuana a federal crime." He went on to explain that "defying that command, many states have enacted conflicting laws authorizing marijuana use as a local concern." Matey reasoned that the Controlled Substances Act "remains the supreme Law of the Land," urging that this "cannot be ignored in disputes about marijuana-related contracts." He concluded, "[l]itigants seeking relief related to drug distribution conspiracies can expect a rigorous inquiry by the district courts," and "if, as is likely, the case and controversy turns on controlled substances, a prompt dismissal."

== Notable Non-Judicial Writings and Lectures ==
In an article published in the Harvard Journal of Law & Public Policy, Matey cited the writings of Adrian Vermeule, William Blackstone, and Hadley Arkes, and advocated for a return to classical jurisprudence, which he argued “embrace[s] the ‘canons of moral reasoning that guided the Founders themselves then they had set about to from a new government,’ ones that for thousands of years have helped build governments with the best chance at safeguarding natural rights.” He wrote further that “Judges must follow the path of the law that begins with text, as ordinarily understood by the People when adopted, a people who reached for their common good by relying on the natural law.” He concluded that judges cannot properly interpret law “without engaging the natural law foundations against which, as Blackstone argued, ‘depend all human laws; that is to say, no human laws should be suffered to contradict.’” Ultimately, in his view, “‘the principles of the classical legal tradition are our own principles, written into our own traditions,’” and “those principles and traditions reveal a tool, available all along, that accounts for text and purpose: the classical method of legal interpretation that uses the law’s text, context, subject matter, consequences, reason, and spirit to search out meaning.”

In a substack essay published in Adrian Vermeule’s The New Digest, Matey wrote that “judging requires fidelity to law as it has always been understood, drawing on the thick layer of reasoning and rationale common not only to our founding generation, but the generations that inspired the founders to act.”

Speaking on a Catholic University of America panel for the University’s Project on Constitutionalism in the United States, Originalism and the Catholic Intellectual Tradition, Matey stated, “we can now be certain that originalism demands a wider consideration of historical sources,” which he claims would lead to the “discover[y] that there really is no distinction between traditional faith grounded in moral realism and the common law that was commonly known to generations from the Founding forward.” Matey joined William H. Pryor, Jr. of the U.S. Court of Appeals for the Eleventh Circuit as the first two judges in the Project’s Visiting Jurist Program.

Matey has also written about how his judicial approach is reflected in his opinions. Writing about his opinion in McDowell v. Bayhealth Medical Center, Matey observed that the First Amendment’s religion clauses “require[] us to ask: what is religion?” Drawing from Thomas Aquinas and other classical sources, he concluded that the “traditional understanding of religion” is “an organized set of established dogma.” America “cast aside” the “classical correlation between the organized practices of religion and the individual duty to God that animated Founding-era thinking” in the “1960s as we became accustomed to hearing about toleration for individual preference. That formed a custom. A habit, a practice, a preference that forced aside tradition.” Matey called for a return to tradition, which “is part of the fundamental law because its principles and accompanying practices are necessarily derived from the natural law. And those principles cannot be abrogated even by the Sovereign or by customs to the contrary.”

== Personal life ==
Matey is a practicing Roman Catholic and has spoken candidly about his faith in several public speeches.

Matey is an Adjunct Professor at Seton Hall University School of Law where he teaches administrative law and jurisprudence. He is also a member of the American Law Institute, the Federalist Society, and the Knights of Columbus. Up until his nomination, he was a member of the Republican National Lawyers Association.

Legal offices
Preceded by Julio M. Fuentes	Judge of the United States Court of Appeals for the Third Circuit; 2019–present	Incumbent
