= Jennifer P. Wilson =

American judge (born 1975)

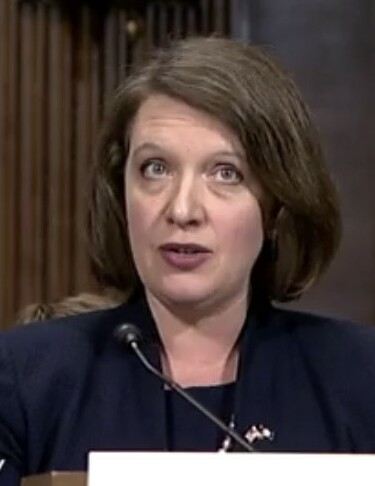

Judge of the United States District Court for the Middle District of Pennsylvania
- Incumbent
- Assumed office November 8, 2019
- Appointed by: Donald Trump
- Preceded by: Yvette Kane

Personal details
- Born: Jennifer Marie Philpott; 1975 (age 50–51) Washington, D.C., U.S.
- Education: Swarthmore College (BA); Brooklyn Law School (JD)

Jennifer Marie Philpott Wilson (born 1975) is a United States district judge of the United States District Court for the Middle District of Pennsylvania.

== Education ==
Wilson earned her Bachelor of Arts, cum laude, from Swarthmore College and her Juris Doctor, summa cum laude, from Brooklyn Law School, where she served as the Executive Notes and Comments Editor for the Brooklyn Law Review.

== Career ==
Upon graduation from law school, Wilson served as a law clerk for Judge Jon Phipps McCalla of the United States District Court for the Western District of Tennessee and for Judge Julio M. Fuentes of the United States Court of Appeals for the Third Circuit.

She then served as a trial attorney with the Department of Justice's Tax Division and was an associate with Chadbourne & Parke LLP. From 2009 until 2019, she was a partner with Philpott Wilson LLP, in Duncannon, Pennsylvania, where her practice included civil litigation, criminal defense, and family law matters. From 2011 to 2012, she was an adjunct professor at Penn State Dickinson Law, teaching a course on written advocacy and judicial opinions.

=== Federal judicial service ===
On May 3, 2019, President Donald Trump announced his intent to nominate Wilson to serve as a United States district judge for the United States District Court for the Middle District of Pennsylvania. On May 13, 2019, her nomination was sent to the Senate. President Trump nominated Wilson to the seat vacated by Judge Yvette Kane, who assumed senior status on October 11, 2018. On June 5, 2019, a hearing on her nomination was held before the Senate Judiciary Committee. On June 27, 2019, her nomination was reported out of committee by an 18–4 vote. On November 6, 2019, the United States Senate invoked cloture on her nomination by an 89–3 vote. On November 7, 2019, her nomination was confirmed by a 88–3 vote. She received her judicial commission on November 8, 2019.

Legal offices
| Preceded by Yvette Kane | Judge of the United States District Court for the Middle District of Pennsylvania; 2019–present | Incumbent |
