= Frank Giannetti =

American football player (born 1968)

No. 65, 90
- Position: Defensive tackle

Personal information
- Born: March 14, 1968 (age 58); Toms River, New Jersey, U.S.
- Listed height: 6 ft 2 in (1.88 m)
- Listed weight: 267 lb (121 kg)

Career information
- High school: Toms River East
- College: Penn State
- NFL draft: 1991: 10th round, 263rd overall pick

Career history
- Indianapolis Colts (1991); Atlanta Falcons (1993); Charlotte Rage (1993)

Awards and highlights
- First-team All-East (1990)
- Stats at Pro Football Reference

Frank John Giannetti (born March 14, 1968) is an American former professional football player who was a defensive tackle for the Indianapolis Colts of the National Football League (NFL). He was selected by the Colts in the tenth round of the 1991 NFL draft. He played college football for the Penn State Nittany Lions.

Born in Toms River, New Jersey, Giannetti attended Toms River High School East.
