= 2023 Boston Marathon =

Footrace in Boston, Massachusetts, US

- Venue: Boston, Massachusetts, United States
- Date: April 17, 2023

Champions
- Men: Evans Chebet (2:05:54)
- Women: Hellen Obiri (2:21:38)
- Wheelchair men: Marcel Hug (1:17:06)
- Wheelchair women: Susannah Scaroni (1:41:45)

The 2023 Boston Marathon was a marathon race held in Boston, Massachusetts, on April 17, 2023. It was the 127th official running of the race, and 125th time it was run on course (excluding the virtual event of 2020, and the ekiden of 1918). It also marked the 10th anniversary of the Boston Marathon bombing. The field was limited to 30,000 runners.

== Results ==
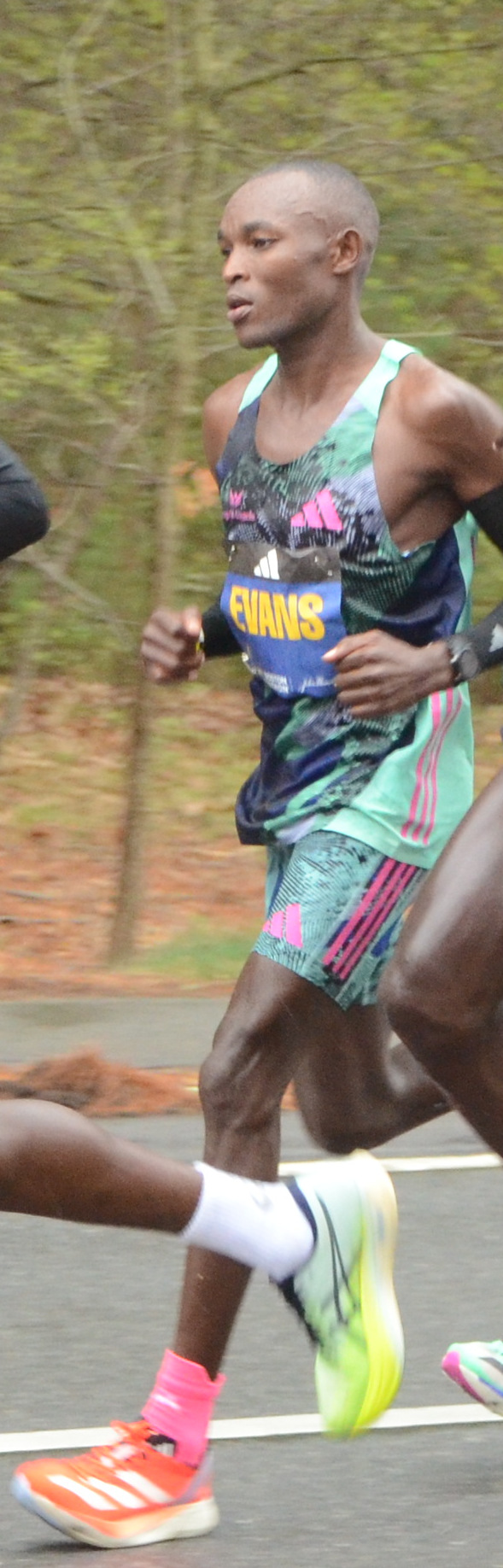
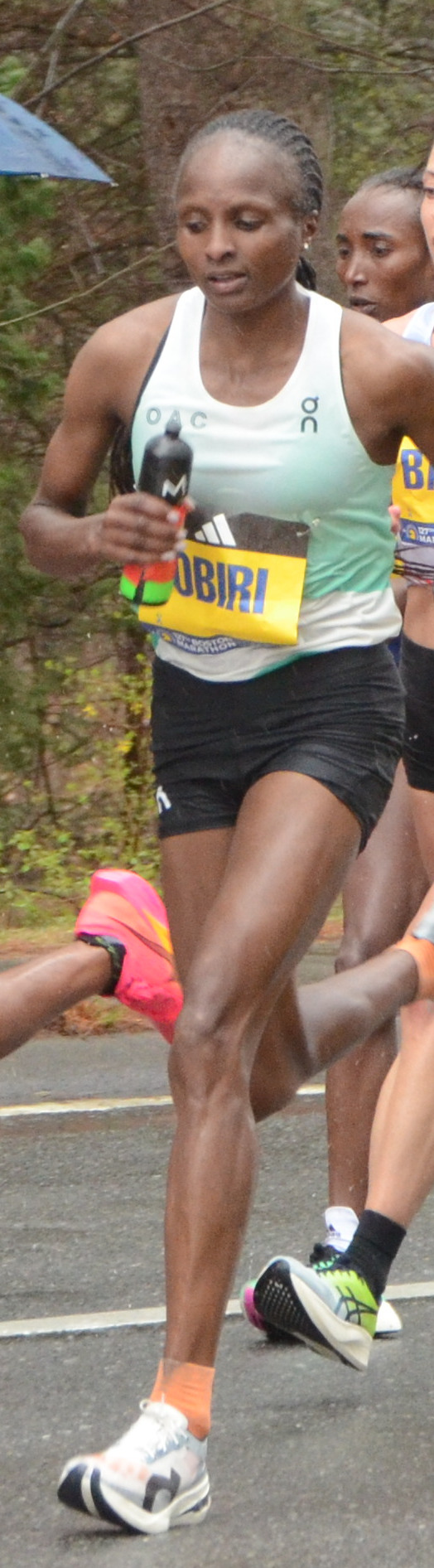
Evans Chebet and Hellen Obiri, elite men's and women's winners, respectively, near the halfway point of the race

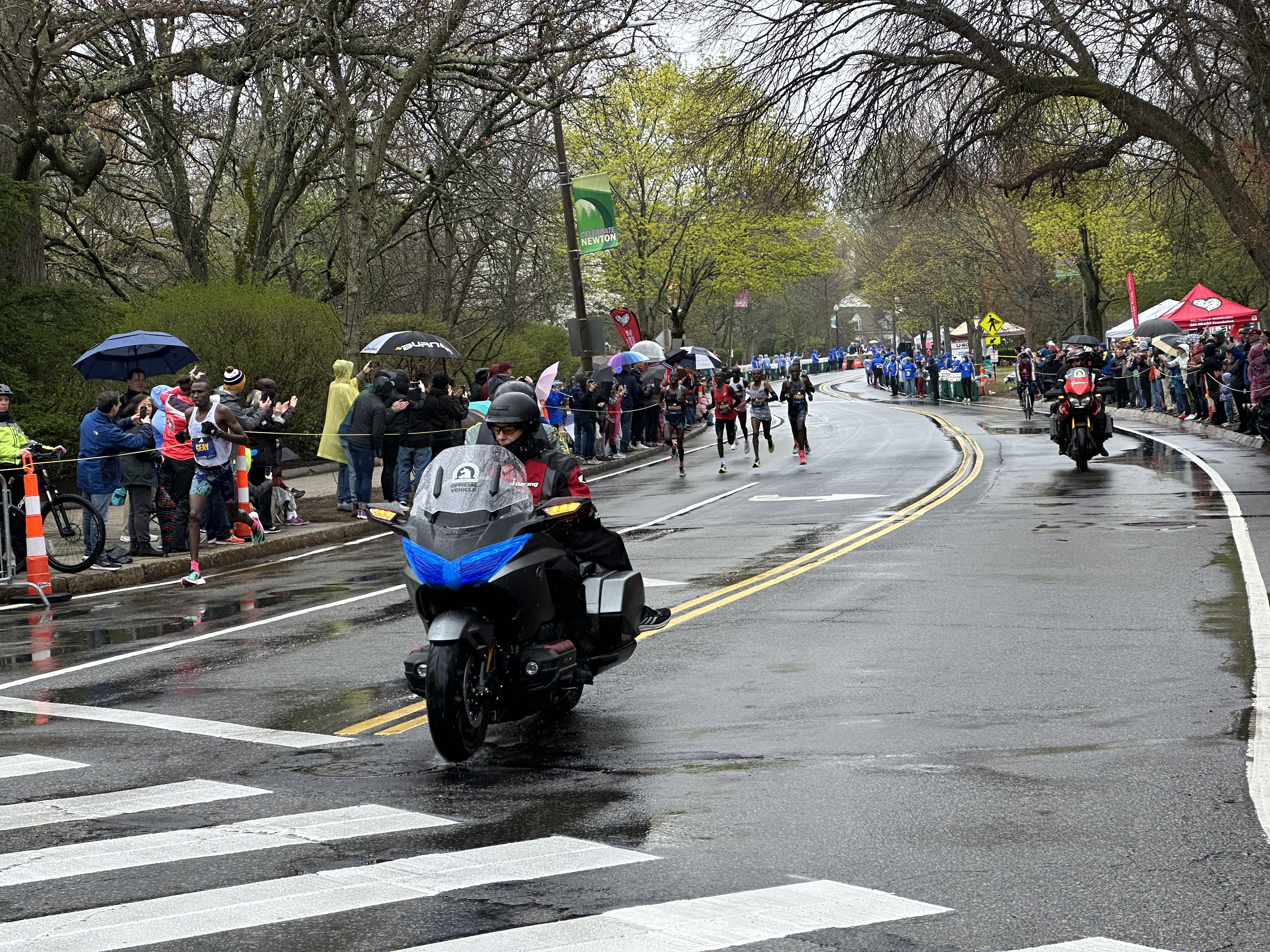
Lead men just past mile 19, with Gabriel Geay (at left) well ahead of the pack. For a closer view of the pack seconds later, see this photo.

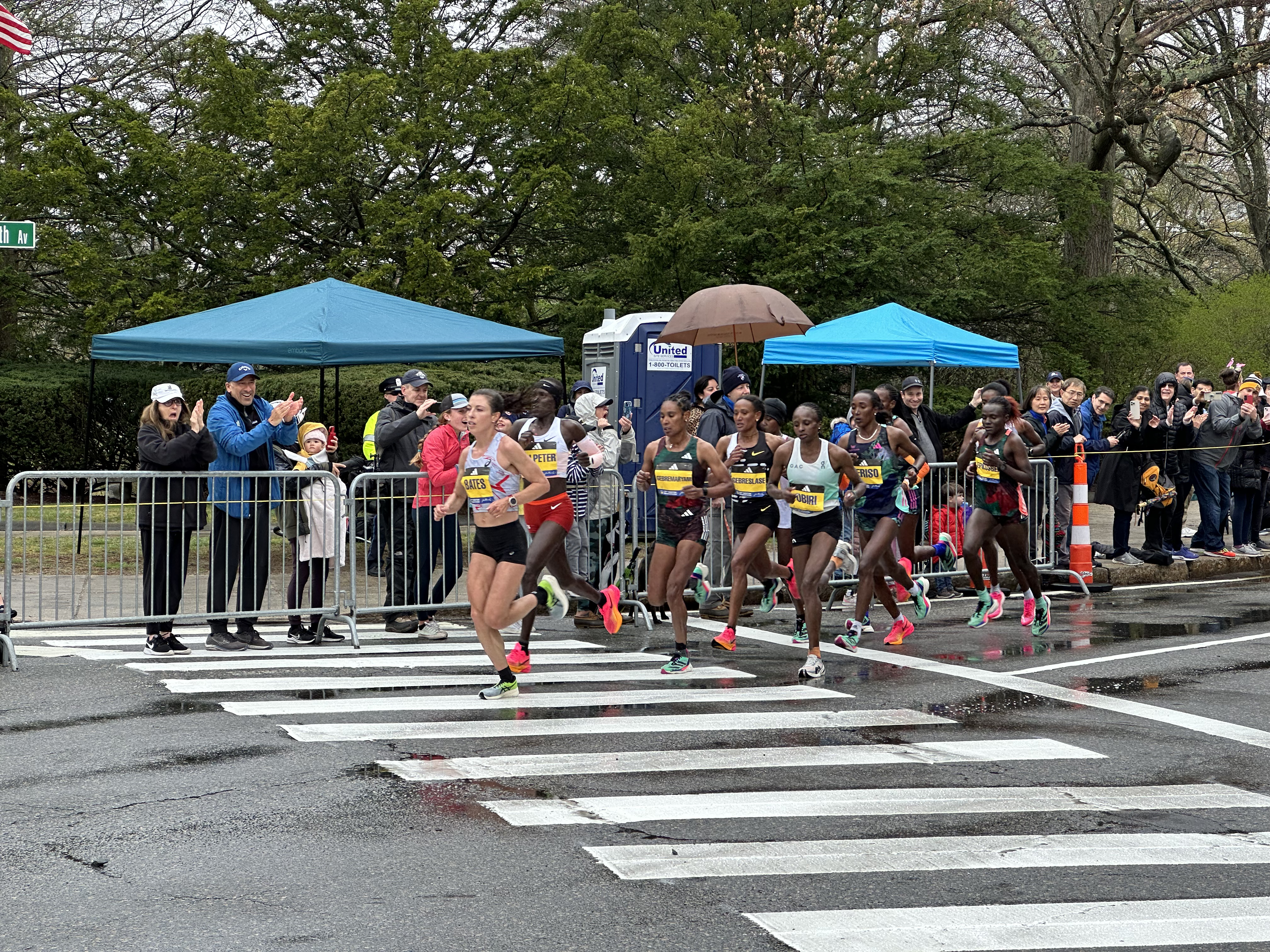
Emma Bates leads the women, followed by Lonah Salpeter and Hellen Obiri, the eventual winner, just past mile 19

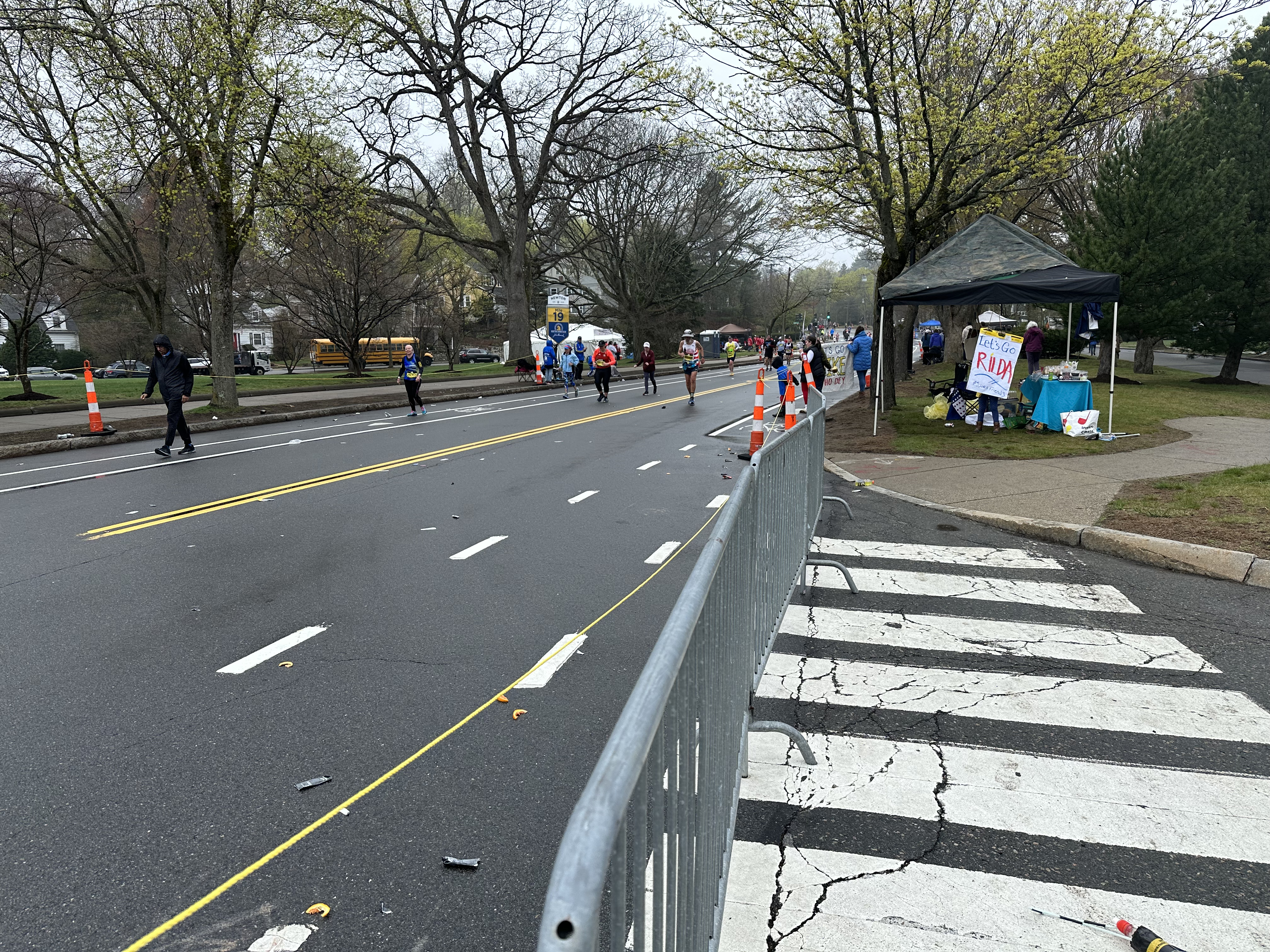
Some 30,000 runners participated officially. A steady stream ran, jogged or walked past mile 19 at 3:20 pm, hours after the winners crossed the finish line.

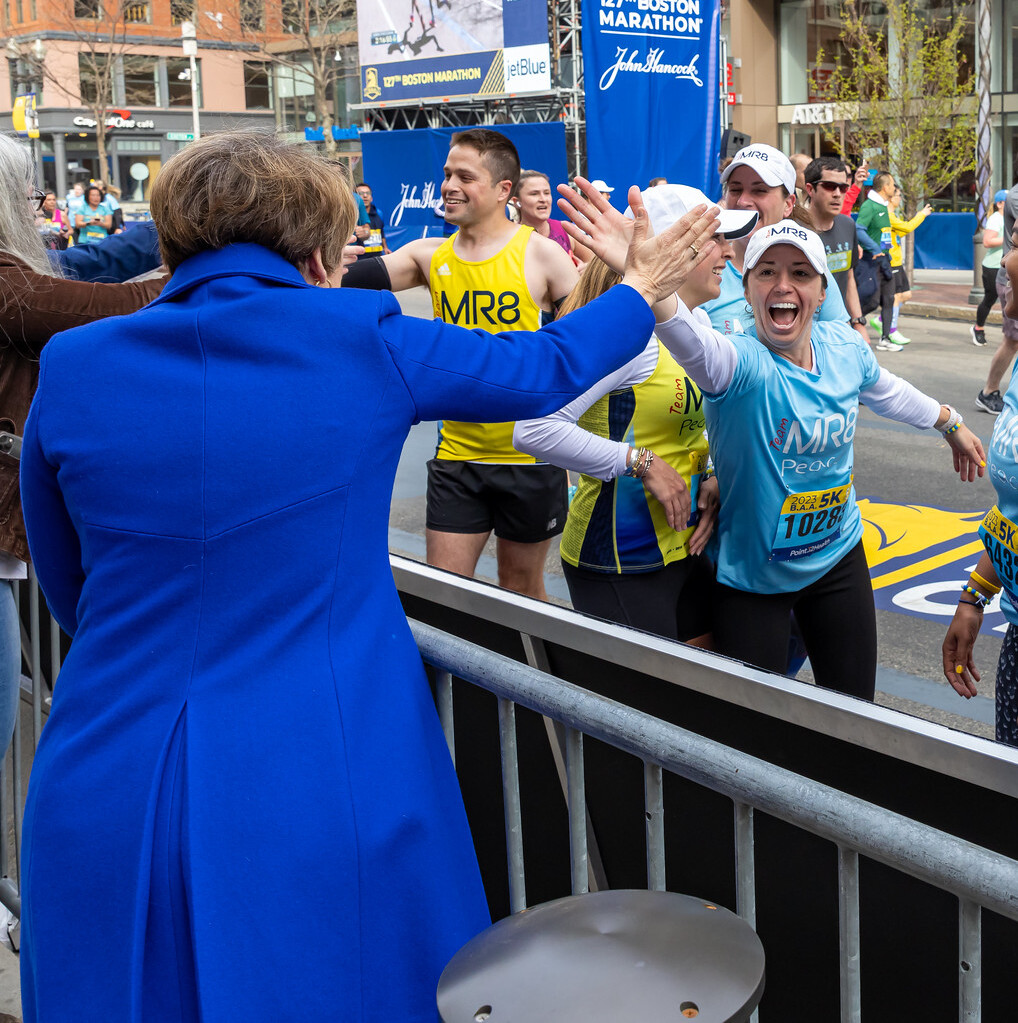
A competitor high fives Massachusetts Governor Maura Healey

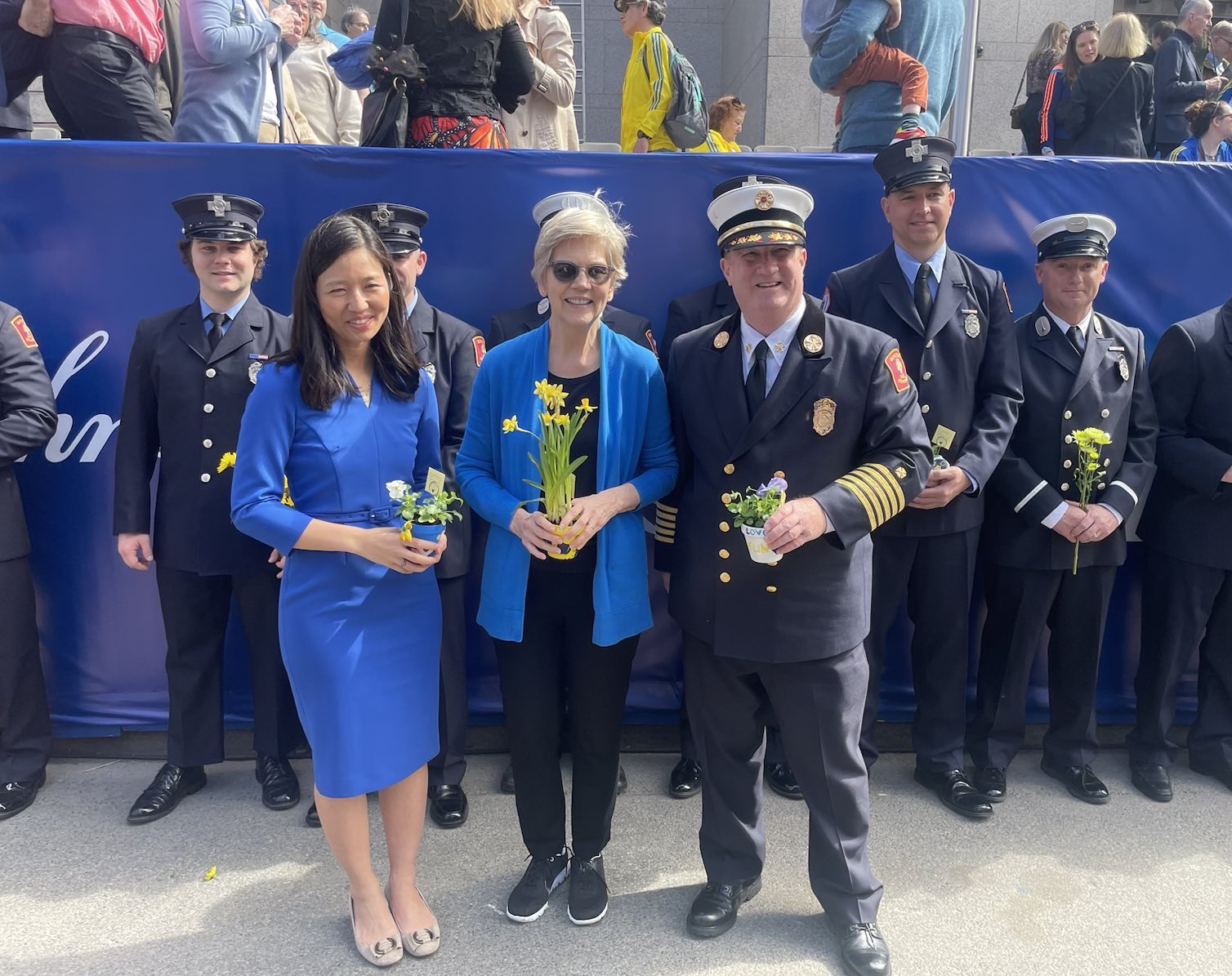
Two days before the marathon, Mayor Michelle Wu and Senator Elizabeth Warren participate in a One Boston Day commemoration on the 10th anniversary of the 2013 Boston Marathon bombing.

=== Men ===
Elite men's top 30 finishers
Place	Athlete	Nationality	Time
1st place, gold medalist(s)	Evans Chebet	Kenya	2:05:54
2nd place, silver medalist(s)	Gabriel Geay	Tanzania	2:06:04
3rd place, bronze medalist(s)	Benson Kipruto	Kenya	2:06:06
4	Albert Korir	Kenya	2:08:01
5	Zouhair Talbi	Morocco	2:08:35
6	Eliud Kipchoge	Kenya	2:09:23
7	Scott Fauble	United States	2:09:44
8	Hassan Chahdi	France	2:09:46
9	John Korir	Kenya	2:10:04
10	Matthew McDonald	United States	2:10:17
11	Conner Mantz	United States	2:10:25
12	CJ Albertson	United States	2:10:33
13	Nico Montanez	United States	2:10:52
14	Shura Kitata	Ethiopia	2:11:26
15	Andualem Belay	Ethiopia	2:11:50
16	Hendrik Pfeiffer	Germany	2:12:22
17	JP Flavin	United States	2:13:27
18	Turner Wiley	United States	2:13:57
19	Isaac Mpofu	Zimbabwe	2:14:08
20	Chad Hall	United States	2:14:13
21	Colin Mickow	United States	2:14:27
22	Mark Korir	Kenya	2:14:37
23	Ben True	United States	2:16:06
24	Connor Weaver	United States	2:16:25
25	Jonas Hampton	United States	2:17:05
26	Ian Butler	United States	2:17:55
27	Edward Mulder	United States	2:18:04
28	Joseph Whelan	United States	2:18:23
29	Zachary Ornelas	United States	2:20:08
30	Sam Chelanga	United States	2:20:20

=== Women ===
Elite women's top 30 finishers
Place	Athlete	Nationality	Time
1st place, gold medalist(s)	Hellen Obiri	Kenya	2:21:38
2nd place, silver medalist(s)	Amane Beriso	Ethiopia	2:21:50
3rd place, bronze medalist(s)	Lonah Salpeter	Israel	2:21:57
4th	Ababel Yeshaneh	Ethiopia	2:22:00
5th	Emma Bates	United States	2:22:10
6th	Nazret Weldu	Eritrea	2:23:25
7th	Angela Tanui	Kenya	2:24:12
8th	Hiwot Gebremaryam	Ethiopia	2:24:30
9th	Mary Ngugi	Kenya	2:24:33
10th	Gotytom Gebreslase	Ethiopia	2:24:34
11th	Aliphine Tuliamuk	United States	2:24:37
12th	Joyciline Jepkosgei	Kenya	2:24:44
13th	Viola Cheptoo	Kenya	2:24:49
14th	Nell Rojas	United States	2:24:51
15th	Nienke Brinkman	Netherlands	2:24:58
16th	Celestine Chepchirchir	Kenya	2:25:07
17th	Sara Hall	United States	2:25:48
18th	Desiree Linden	United States	2:27:18
19th	Vibian Chepkirui	Kenya	2:28:12
20th	Annie Frisbie	United States	2:28:45
21st	Atsede Baysa	Ethiopia	2:30:14
22nd	Anna Rohrer	United States	2:30:52
23rd	Sydney Devore	United States	2:31:08
24th	Maggie Montoya	United States	2:31:19
25th	Anne-Marie Blaney	United States	2:31:32
26th	Maegan Krifchin	United States	2:32:46
27th	Dakotah Lindwurm	United States	2:33:53
28th	Erika Kemp	United States	2:33:57
29th	Savannah Berry	United States	2:34:30
30th	Laura Thweatt	United States	2:34:35

=== Wheelchair men ===
Wheelchair men's top 3 finishers
Position	Athlete	Nationality	Time
1st place, gold medalist(s)	Marcel Hug	Switzerland	01:17:06
2nd place, silver medalist(s)	Daniel Romanchuk	United States	01:27:45
3rd place, bronze medalist(s)	Jetze Plat	Netherlands	01:28:35

=== Wheelchair women ===
Wheelchair women's top 3 finishers
Position	Athlete	Nationality	Time
1st place, gold medalist(s)	Susannah Scaroni	United States	01:41:45
2nd place, silver medalist(s)	Madison De Rozario	Australia	01:46:55
3rd place, bronze medalist(s)	Wakako Tsuchida	Japan	01:47:04
