= Miami Southridge Senior High School =

Location
- 19355 Southwest 114th Avenue; Miami, (Miami-Dade), Florida 33157; United States; 25°35′11″N 80°22′32″W

Information
- Type: Public secondary
- Established: September 1974
- School district: Miami-Dade County Public Schools
- Principal: Humberto J. Miret
- Teaching staff: 96.00 (FTE)
- Grades: 9–12
- Enrollment: 2,235 (2023-2024)
- Student to teacher ratio: 23.28
- Campus: Suburban
- Colors: Red, black and silver
- Nickname: Spartans
- Average class size: 24
- Website: School website

Miami Southridge Senior High School is a secondary school located in South Miami Heights, Florida (Miami postal address). Its current principal is Humberto J. Miret. The school serves ninth through twelfth grade students in a mostly unincorporated suburban and rural area in the southern stretches of Miami-Dade County between South Miami and Homestead.

== History ==
Miami Southridge was the zoned high school for Cutler Bay prior to 2012. Now Cutler Bay High School is the zoned school.

== Campus ==
It is in South Miami Heights, a census-designated place in unincorporated Miami-Dade County, Florida, with a Miami postal address.

== Demographics ==
In 2009-10, Miami Southridge Senior High School's student body was 48.2% Hispanic (of any race), 40.3% Black, and 8.7% non-Hispanic White. Smaller groups included Asian, Indian, and multiracial ethnicities.

54.9% of the students were eligible for free and reduced lunch, 19.2% were students with disabilities (SWD), and 9.3% were students of limited English proficiency (LEP).

== Academic performance ==
In 2011 Perry Stein of the Miami Herald described Southridge as "a low-performing school".

== Notable alumni ==
=== Athletics ===
==== Baseball ====
- Robert Andino - Major League Baseball player (Baltimore Orioles)
- Yan Gomes - Major League Baseball player
- Fredi Gonzalez - Major League manager (Atlanta Braves)
- Orlando Palmeiro - Major League Baseball player
- Nelson Santovenia - former Major League Baseball player (Montreal Expos)
- Shannon Stewart - Major League Baseball player (Toronto Blue Jays)

==== Football ====
- Robert Bailey - former cornerback in the National Football League
- Dicaprio Bootle - player for the Kansas City Chiefs
- Courtland Bullard - former linebacker in the National Football League
- Jamal Carter - American football player
- Randy Charlton - American football player
- Jameel Cook - former fullback in the National Football League
- Shawn Davis - American Football player
- Darren Davis - former running back in the Canadian Football League
- Troy Davis - former running back in the National Football League and Canadian Football League
- Steve Everitt - former offensive lineman in the National Football League
- Steve Grant - former linebacker in the National Football League
- Lamont Green - former linebacker in the National Football League
- Sedrick Irvin - former running back in the National Football League
- Tim Lester - former running back in the National Football League
- Justin McCray- NFL (Offensive Linemen) Tennessee Titans, Green Bay Packers, Cleveland Browns, Atlanta Falcons
- Jeremiah McKinnon - American football player
- Winston Moss - former NFL player and coach
- Damaso Munoz -former NFL and CFL player
- Branden Oliver, running back in the National Football League
- Willis Peguese, former defensive end in the National Football League
- Kevin Smith - former running back in the National Football League
- Shevin Smith - former safety in the National Football League
- Lenny Taylor, former wide receiver in the National Football League and the Arena Football League
- Mark Word, former defensive end in the National Football League
- Jordan McCray American Football Player
- Gerod Holliman American Football Player
- Marcelis Branch American Football Player
- Tyrique Stevenson Professional Football Player for the Chicago Bears
- . Alberto White - NFL, CFL, AFL, XFL - Former Professional football player

==== Mixed martial arts ====
- Mike Rio - former fighter in the UFC, also participated in the reality show The Ultimate Fighter

==== Track & Field ====
- Kayla White - sprinter who competed at the 2023 USA Outdoor Track and Field Championships

== Notable faculty ==
- Steve Hertz, baseball player and coach

== See also ==
- Miami-Dade County Public Schools
