= Terrence Wisdom =

American football player (born 1971)

No. 61
- Position: Guard

Personal information
- Born: December 4, 1971 (age 54); Brooklyn, New York, U.S.
- Listed height: 6 ft 4 in (1.93 m)
- Listed weight: 300 lb (136 kg)

Career information
- High school: Franklin Delano Roosevelt (Brooklyn)
- College: Syracuse
- NFL draft: 1993: undrafted

Career history
- Seattle Seahawks (1993)*; New York Jets (1994–1995); → London Monarchs (1995–1997); Scottish Claymores (1998); Florida Bobcats (1998–2000)
- * Offseason or practice squad member only

Awards and highlights
- First-team All-East (1991)
- Stats at Pro Football Reference

Terrence Wisdom (born December 4, 1971) is an American former professional football player who was a guard for the New York Jets of the National Football League (NFL) in 1995. He played college football for the Syracuse Orange.
