= Steve Grant =

American football player and motivational speaker (born 1969)

No. 59
- Position: Linebacker

Personal information
- Born: December 23, 1969 (age 56); Miami, Florida, U.S.
- Listed height: 6 ft 2 in (1.88 m)
- Listed weight: 240 lb (109 kg)

Career information
- High school: Miami Southridge (Miami, Florida)
- College: West Virginia
- NFL draft: 1992: 10th round, 253rd overall pick

Career history
- Indianapolis Colts (1992–1997); Tampa Bay Buccaneers (1998)*
- * Offseason or practice squad member only

Awards and highlights
- First-team All-East (1991); Second-team All-East (1990)

Career NFL statistics
- Games played: 83
- Games started: 47
- Tackles: 233
- Sacks: 3
- Interceptions: 1
- Fumble recoveries: 6
- Stats at Pro Football Reference

Stephen Mitchell Grant (born December 23, 1969) is an American former professional football player who was a linebacker for the Indianapolis Colts of the National Football League (NFL). He played college football for the West Virginia Mountaineers. As of 2019, Grant is the chaplain for the Texas Tech University football program in Lubbock, Texas.

== Professional career ==
Grant was selected by the Indianapolis Colts in the 1992 NFL draft. Grant was the Colts' Hard Nose Player of the Year in 1994, when he recorded a fumble recovery. In 1995, Grant started all 16 games of the season and recorded his first career professional interception. Injuries ended Grant's career early in 1997 however, after spending six seasons in the NFL.

Grant, who was active in the Indianapolis community during his career, was known by his teammates as the "Naked Preacher" for his habit of sitting in the locker room after showering, draped in a towel, and reading a Bible, asking his teammates if they knew Jesus. Though some were dismissive, others came to Grant for advice. He first encountered teammate Derwin Gray in 1993, encouraging the latter to explore faith and later convert to Christianity. Gray went on to become a pastor after his own football career ended.

== After football ==
After retiring, Grant went on to become a motivational speaker. He was later hired by the Fellowship of Christian Athletes, of which he was a member, as its chaplain at Texas Tech University.
