= Cutler Bay Senior High School =

High school in Florida, United States

Coordinates: 25.5712°N 80.3305°W

Information
- School type: Public high school
- Established: August 2012
- Principal: Lucas de la Torre
- Grades: 9th-12th
- Enrollment: 576 (2023-2024)

Cutler Bay Senior High School is a magnet school and public high school in Cutler Bay, Florida. It is a part of Miami Dade County Public Schools.

== History ==
Cutler Bay Senior High School was originally Centennial Middle School, which opened its doors in 1976. From 2011 to 2012, the Cutler Bay town council expressed a desire for a high school. It first considered a charter school, but instead decided to persuade the Miami-Dade County School District to establish a district comprehensive high school.

At the time the district chose to convert the school into a high school, the community's two middle schools—Centennial for grades 7–8, Cutler Ridge for 6th grade—had lower than average student populations. What became Cutler Bay High School took territory from Miami Southridge High School, the high school previously zoned for the town of Cutler Bay. When Cutler Bay decided not to move forward with the charter school, it cut $70,000 from its budget intended for that purpose, which contributed to lowering taxes.

Cutler Bay High opened in August 2012, making it the first high school in the town. Mayor of Cutler Bay Ed MacDougall stated that, by having a zoned high school in the town limits, the community would feel invested in Cutler Bay High. The Cutler Bay city council paid for the development of the school through a $2.75 million loan.

Initially, the plan was for the building to support grades 7–12 with Centennial Middle School maintaining a presence on campus. The 7th and 8th grade classes were eventually moved to Cutler Ridge Middle School. When it opened in 2012, Cutler Bay High only had the 9th grade, but added one grade per year until 2015. Its first graduating class in 2016 had 76 students.

== Curriculum and academic performance ==
The school offers Four magnet programs; Liberal Arts, iPrep (online-based), COAST, and Digital Business Marketing. Students may also opt into the Cambridge Program.

It received an "A" rating from the State of Florida in 2016.
