= Annette Meyers =

American mystery writer

Annette Meyers (born Annette Brafman; January 31, 1934) is an American mystery writer. She also writes under the shared pseudonym Maan Meyers with her writing partner and husband, Martin Meyers.

== Biography ==
Annette Brafman was born in New York City on January 31, 1934. Her parents were farmers. She grew up on a farm in Toms River, New Jersey. As a youth, she enjoyed the Nancy Drew novels and books by Ernest Hemingway and F. Scott Fitzgerald. She graduated in 1951 from Toms River High School (since renamed as Toms River High School South) and attended Douglass College, where she earned an A.B. in English 1955. She worked as a high school English teacher from 1955 to 1960 and as an assistant for Harold Prince from 1960 to 1976, raising funds to help him produce notable musicals including Fiddler on the Roof, Company, Follies, and A Little Night Music. She married Martin Meyers, a writer an actor, on August 19, 1963; they have no children.

Meyers quit working for Prince in order to focus on her writing career. However, she struggled to get her work published, so she worked as a recruiter on Wall Street. Then she had the idea to write a mystery that incorporated her theatre and Wall Street careers. The resulting book, The Big Killing, was released in 1989.

Meyers is known for her Smith and Wetzon series and Olivia Brown series as well as the Dutchman series she wrote with her husband, Martin Meyers, published under the joint pseudonym Maan Meyers. Leslie Wetzon is based on Meyers. Olivia Brown was inspired by Edna St. Vincent Millay. Meyers has contributed to various story anthologies. Her books have been translated into several languages.

She is a member of the Authors Guild, Mystery Writers of America, Sisters in Crime, MENSA, Private Eye Writers of America, and the International Association of Crime Writers. She was once President of Sisters in Crime. She lives in New York City. Her favorite book is Moby Dick.

== Selected works ==
=== Smith and Wetzon series ===
- The Big Killing, Bantam, 1989.
- Tender Death, Bantam, 1990.
- The Deadliest Option, Bantam, 1991.
- Blood on the Street, Doubleday, 1992.
- Murder: The Musical, Doubleday, 1993.
- These Bones Were Made for Dancin', Doubleday, 1995.
- The Groaning Board, Doubleday, 1997.
- Hedging, Five Star Press, 2005.

=== Olivia Brown mysteries ===
- Free Love, Mysterious Press/Warner, 1999.
- Murder Me Now, Mysterious, 2001.

=== Dutchman series, with Martin Meyers, under joint pseudonym Maan Meyers ===
- The Dutchman, Doubleday, 1992.
- The Kingsbridge Plot, Doubleday, 1993.
- The High Constable, Doubleday, 1994.
- The Dutchman's Dilemma, Bantam, 1995.
- The House On Mulberry Street, Bantam, 1996.
- The Lucifer Contract, Bantam, 1997.
- The Organ Grinder, Five Star/Gale, 2008.
