= Pat O'Neill (American football) =

American football player (born 1971)

No. 5, 8
- Position: Punter

Personal information
- Born: February 9, 1971 (age 55); Scott AFB, Illinois, U.S.
- Listed height: 6 ft 1 in (1.85 m)
- Listed weight: 200 lb (91 kg)

Career information
- High school: Red Land
- College: Syracuse
- NFL draft: 1994: 5th round, 135th overall pick

Career history
- New England Patriots (1994–1995); Chicago Bears (1995); New York Jets (1995); Jacksonville Jaguars (1997)*
- * Offseason or practice squad member only

Awards and highlights
- PFWA All-Rookie Team (1994); Big East Special Teams Player of the Year (1993); First-team All-East (1991)

Career NFL statistics
- Punts: 113
- Punt yards: 4,444
- Longest punt: 67
- Stats at Pro Football Reference

Patrick James O'Neill (born February 9, 1971) is an American former professional football player who was a punter in the National Football League (NFL) for the New England Patriots, Chicago Bears, and New York Jets. He was selected by the Patriots in the fifth round of the 1994 NFL draft. He played college football at Syracuse University.
