= Anderson v. TikTok =

2024 United States Third Circuit Court of Appeals case

Anderson v. TikTok, Inc.
- Court: United States Court of Appeals for the Third Circuit
- Full case name: Tawainna Anderson, Individually and as Administratix of the Estate of N.A., a Deceased Minor, v. TikTok, Inc.; ByteDance, Inc.
- Argued: January 17, 2024
- Decided: August 27, 2024
- Citation: ___ F.4d ___

Case history
- Prior history: Appeal from E.D. Pa.

Holding
- Section 230 of the Communications Decency Act does not bar claims against TikTok regarding the recommendations to users via its algorithm.

Court membership
- Judges sitting: Patty Shwartz, Paul Matey, Peter J. Phipps

Case opinions
- Majority: Patty Shwartz

Laws applied
- Section 230 of the Communications Decency Act

Anderson v. TikTok, 2:22-cv-01849, (E.D. Pa.), was a decision by the United States Court of Appeals for the Third Circuit in which the court held that Section 230 of the Communications Decency Act (CDA), 47 U.S.C. § 230, does not bar claims against TikTok, a video-sharing social media platform, regarding TikTok's recommendations to users via its algorithm.

== Background ==
Tawainna Anderson's ten-year-old daughter, Nylah Anderson, died after attempting the "Blackout Challenge" promoted in a video recommended to her TikTok "For You Page" by TikTok's algorithm. The "Blackout Challenge" encourages viewers to choke themselves with belts, purse strings, and similar items until they pass out, according to the complaint filed by Tawainna Anderson against TikTok and its parent company, ByteDance. The complaint alleged the defendants were aware of the videos and the challenges, allowed such videos to be posted, failed to warn users of the risks, and recommended the videos to users, including minors, through their algorithm.

== District court ruling ==
The United States District Court for the Eastern District of Pennsylvania dismissed the complaint under Section 230 of the CDA, which protects interactive computer service providers from liability for content posted by third parties. The court found that TikTok's role in recommending the video fell under this immunity and ruled that "because Plaintiff seeks to hold Defendants liable as 'publishers' of third-party content, they are immune under the Communications Decency Act."

== Circuit court ruling ==
The United States Court of Appeals for the Third Circuit reversed the lower court’s decision in part, vacated it in part, and remanded the case. The Third Circuit held that TikTok's algorithm, which curates and recommends videos to its users, is TikTok's own "expressive activity," or first-party speech, rather than information posted by another. Since Section 230 only provides immunity for third-party content, it does not protect TikTok from liability for its own recommendations. Therefore, the court concluded that Anderson's claims were not barred by Section 230, allowing the lawsuit to proceed.

The Third Circuit cited a recent U.S. Supreme Court decision, Moody v. NetChoice, where the Court held that a platform's algorithm that reflects "editorial judgments" about "compiling the third-party speech it wants in the way it wants" is the platform's own "expressive product" and is therefore protected by the First Amendment.

"Had Nylah viewed a Blackout Challenge video through TikTok's search function, rather than through her FYP, then TikTok may be viewed more like a repository of third-party content than an affirmative promoter of such content," said the Third Circuit in a footnote.

Judge Paul B. Matey concurred in part and dissented in part.
