= 1991 All-East football team =

American college football all-star team

The 1991 All-East football team consists of American football players chosen by the Associated Press as the best players at each position among the Eastern colleges and universities during the 1991 NCAA Division I-A football season.

== Offense ==
=== Quarterback ===
- Tony Sacca, Penn State (AP-1)
- Marvin Graves, Syracuse (AP-2)

=== Running backs ===
- David Walker, Syracuse (AP-1)
- Adrian Murrell, West Virginia (AP-1)
- Richie Anderson, Penn State (AP-2)
- Chuckie Dukes, Boston College (AP-2)

=== Wide receivers ===
- Terry Smith, Penn State (AP-1)
- O. J. McDuffie, Penn State (AP-1)
- James Guarantano, Rutgers (AP-2)
- Chris Bouyer, Pittsburgh (AP-2)

=== Tight end ===
- Mark Chmura, Boston College (AP-1)
- Dave Moore, Pittsburgh (AP-2)

=== Linemen ===
- Mike Compton, West Virginia (AP-1)
- Terrence Wisdom, Syracuse (AP-1)
- Tre' Johnson, Temple (AP-1)
- Scott Miller, Pittsburgh (AP-1)
- Travis Broadbent, Rutgers (AP-1)
- Brian Krulikowski, Temple (AP-2)
- John Ray, West Virginia (AP-2)
- Jeff Christy, Pittsburgh (AP-2)
- John Pirog, Army (AP-2)
- Michael Davis, Navy (AP-2)

=== Placekicker ===
- John Biskup, Syracuse (AP-1)
- Craig Fayak, Penn State (AP-2)

=== Return specialist ===
- Qadry Ismail, Syracuse (AP-1)
- Marshall Roberts, Rutgers (AP-2)

== Defense ==
=== Linemen ===
- George Rooks, Syracuse (AP-1)
- Swift Burch, Temple (AP-1)
- Sean Gilbert, Pittsburgh (AP-1)
- Bob Kuberski, Navy (AP-1)
- Keith Hamilton, Pittsburgh (AP-2)
- Kevin Mitchell, Syracuse (AP-2)
- John Stolberg, Boston College (AP-2)
- Jim Gray, West Virginia (AP-2)

=== Linebackers ===
- Elnardo Webster, Rutgers (AP-1)
- Tom McManus, Boston College (AP-1)
- Steve Grant, West Virginia (AP-1)
- Ricardo McDonald, Pittsburgh (AP-2)
- Keith Goganious, Penn State (AP-2)
- Rich McKenzie, Penn State (AP-2)

=== Defensive backs ===
- Mike McElrath, Army (AP-1)
- Steve Israel, Pittsburgh (AP-1)
- Darren Perry, Penn State (AP-1)
- Leonard Humphries, Penn State (AP-1)
- Jay Bellamy, Rutgers (AP-2)
- Tim Sandquist, Syracuse (AP-2)
- Charlie Brennan, Boston College (AP-2)
- Malik Jackson, Rutgers (AP-2)

=== Punter ===
- Pat O'Neil, Syracuse (AP-1)
- Trent Thompson, Temple (AP-2)

== Key ==
- AP = Associated Press

== See also ==
- 1991 College Football All-America Team
