= Ricardo McDonald =

American football player (born 1969)

No. 56, 54, 57
- Position: Linebacker

Personal information
- Born: November 8, 1969 (age 56); Kingston, Jamaica
- Listed height: 6 ft 2 in (1.88 m)
- Listed weight: 235 lb (107 kg)

Career information
- High school: Eastside (Paterson, New Jersey, U.S.)
- College: Pittsburgh
- NFL draft: 1992: 4th round, 88th overall pick

Career history
- Cincinnati Bengals (1992–1997); Chicago Bears (1998–1999); Denver Broncos (2000–2001)*
- * Offseason or practice squad member only

Awards and highlights
- PFWA All-Rookie Team (1992); First-team All-East (1990); Second-team All-East (1991)

Career NFL statistics
- Tackles: 536
- Sacks: 14.5
- Interceptions: 1
- Stats at Pro Football Reference

Ricardo Milton McDonald (born November 8, 1969) is a former linebacker in the National Football League (NFL) that played for the Cincinnati Bengals, Chicago Bears, and the Denver Broncos. He was drafted by the Bengals in the fourth round of the 1992 NFL Draft with the 88th overall pick. He played college football for the University of Pittsburgh under head coach Mike Gottfried and Paul Hackett.

He played for Eastside High School in Paterson, New Jersey under Coach Barrett 'Barry' Rosser. Joe Louis Clark was the school's Principal during his attendance there, as depicted in the film Lean on Me.

== Family tree ==
Ricardo has a twin brother Devon McDonald who played linebacker for University of Notre Dame under Coach Lou Holtz. He went on to play professionally for the Indianapolis Colts and the Arizona Cardinals. Ricardo has a son named Maurice who played linebacker for Tennessee State University under Head Coach Eddie George and also played linebacker for Albany State University under head coach Quinn Gray. His younger cousin Lennox Gordon played collegiately for University of New Mexico. He went on to play professionally for the Indianapolis Colts and the Buffalo Bills. Ricardo's Nephew Maurice McDonald played Wide receiver for University of Maine from 2009 to 2012. McDonald's eldest daughter Brittany McDonald played basketball for Tulane University from 2010 to 2013. He also has a niece, Jazzmine McDonald who played for Indiana University from 2013 to 2016.
