= Mark Colón =

American housing official

Personal details
- Education: Hunter College (BA); Yale University (JD)

Mark Christian Colón is an American attorney and housing official who currently serves as the Deputy Assistant Secretary of Defense for Housing at the Pentagon. He was previously a nominee for Assistant Secretary for Community Planning and Development at the U.S. Department of Housing & Urban Development.

== Early life and education ==
Colón received his Bachelor of Arts from Hunter College and his Juris Doctor from Yale Law School, where he was managing editor of the Yale Law & Policy Review.

== Career ==
Following law school, Colón was a law clerk for Judge Julio M. Fuentes of the United States Court of Appeals for the Third Circuit. He later practiced law at Simpson Thacher & Bartlett and Dechert LLP.

In 2015, Colón was appointed President of the Office of Housing Preservation at New York State Homes and Community Renewal (HCR). In this capacity, he oversaw one of the largest, most diverse affordable housing portfolios in the country, with more than 450,000 units in 3,200 developments across New York. Previously, Colón served as HCR's acting "Disaster Recovery" Counsel, helping to lead post-Hurricane Sandy housing recovery efforts.

Colón has served as the chairperson of El Puente de Williamsburg and a board member of the Institute for Energy Economics and Financial Analysis (IEEFA).

On April 27, 2021, President Joe Biden announced Colón as the nominee for HUD's Assistant Secretary for community planning and development. On April 28, 2021, his nomination was sent to the United States Senate. On January 3, 2022, his nomination was returned to the President.

In March 2024, Colón was appointed Deputy Assistant Secretary of Defense for Housing at the Pentagon. In his capacity, he provides executive leadership for all U.S. military housing worldwide, including approximately 250,000 homes and one million permanent party bed spaces.

== Personal life ==
Colón is a native New Yorker and lives in Brooklyn with his wife, Gina Kim, and their son.
