= Mautner Project =

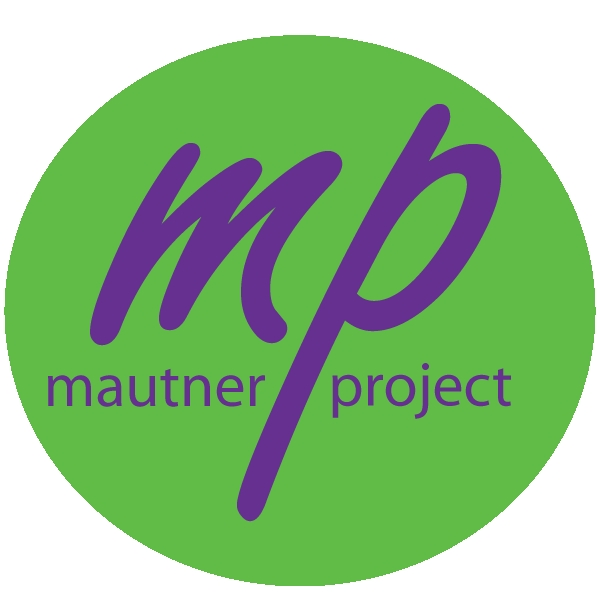
The official Mautner Project logo.

The Mautner Project is a national organization in the United States focused on improving the health of lesbians and other women who partner with women (WPW). It was founded in 1990 and is based in Washington, D.C. The organization provides direct services, engages in community outreach and health education campaigns, trains health care professionals to deliver culturally competent care, and raises awareness of lesbian and WPW health issues.

== Programs and services ==
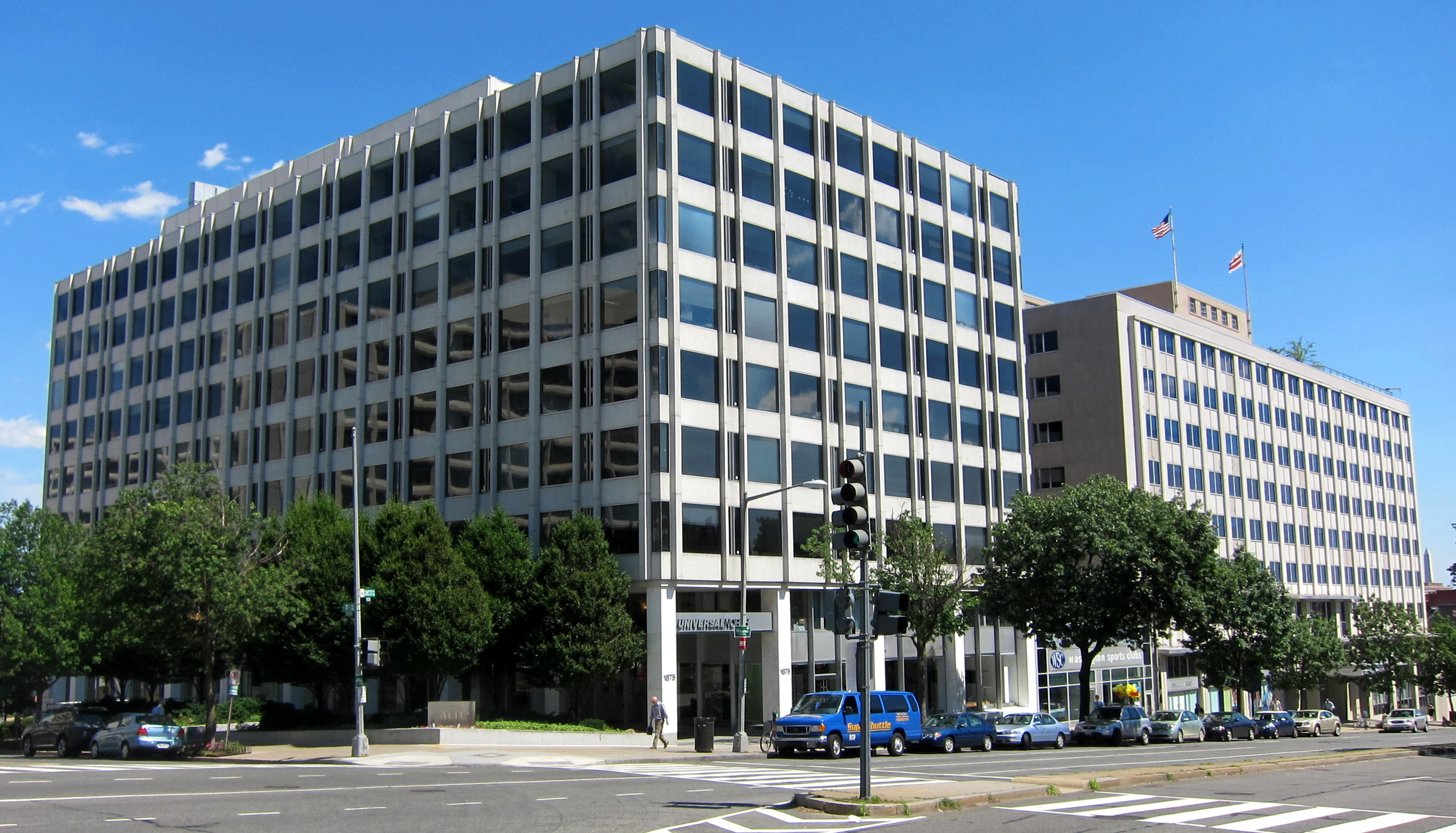
Mautner Project headquarters in Washington, D.C.

The Mautner Project coordinates resources for lesbians and WPW facing illness such as sourcing culturally competent health care, accessing care, and identifying support resources. Mautner Project also offers direct services for women, such as transportation to doctor appointments and support groups for WPW facing illness, the death of a loved one, or caregiving.

The Removing the Barriers Program created by the Mautner Project is a training program designed to educate and bring awareness to healthcare providers about the healthcare needs of WPW.

The Mautner Project also started the S.H.E. Circle, which is the first national health education program focused on African American WPW. Local S.H.E. Circles are information networks where African American lesbian and bisexual women can learn about health issues, ask questions, share information, connect with resources, and provide support to each other.

The Mautner Project is able to provide health information to women and raises awareness of lesbian and WPW health issues via its website, information requests, and participation in community events.

== History ==
The Mautner Project was founded in 1990 following the death of Mary-Helen Mautner in 1989 of breast cancer. Shortly before her death, Mautner asked her partner, Susan Hester, to start an organization that could help other lesbians facing the overwhelming challenges of life-threatening illnesses.

The Mautner Project has engaged in the following collaborations:

- National Lesbian-Feminist Health Coalition projects (founded and facilitated)
- National Breast Cancer Coalition (co-founded, serves on board)
- Training for the Centers for Disease Control and Prevention (CDC) and other agencies of the U.S. Department of Health and Human Services on culturally competent care for lesbians, bisexual and transgender women
- HEALING WORKS!: The National Conference on Lesbians and Cancer (founded and organized)
- Coming Out Of Cancer: Voices From The Lesbian Cancer Epidemic (Partnered with more than one hundred health organizations across the country to raise awareness of LGBT concerns related to cancer)
- National Policy Roundtable
- Lesbian Kisses (partnered with Mazzoni Center and The Safeguards Project)
- LGBTQ-NS Campaign (leading collaboration within the DC Tobacco-Free Families Campaign): smoking cessation campaign designed to engage LGBTQ community members.

In September 2009, the Mautner Project was asked by the White House to send a client to sit with First Lady Michelle Obama during President Barack Obama's September 9 address to a joint session of Congress regarding health care reform.

== Community partnerships ==
Mautner Project has formed multiple community partnerships to fulfill its mission. These partnerships include:

- DC Vote
- Capital Pride
- American Cancer Society
