= Tim Lester (running back) =

American football player (1968–2021)

No. 34
- Position: Running back

Personal information
- Born: June 15, 1968; Miami, Florida, U.S.
- Died: January 12, 2021 (aged 52); Milton, Georgia, U.S.
- Listed height: 5 ft 10 in (1.78 m)
- Listed weight: 233 lb (106 kg)

Career information
- High school: Miami Southridge
- College: Eastern Kentucky
- NFL draft: 1992: 10th round, 255th overall pick

Career history
- Los Angeles Rams (1992–1994); Pittsburgh Steelers (1995–1998); Jacksonville Jaguars (1999)*; Dallas Cowboys (1999)
- * Offseason or practice squad member only

Career NFL statistics
- Rushing yards: 126
- Rushing average: 3.8
- Receptions: 47
- Receiving yards: 331
- Total touchdowns: 2
- Stats at Pro Football Reference

Timothy Lee Lester (June 15, 1968 – January 12, 2021) was an American professional football player.

== Professional career ==
Lester was a running back for eight seasons in the National Football League (NFL) with the Los Angeles Rams, Pittsburgh Steelers, and Dallas Cowboys. He was selected by the Rams in the tenth round of the 1992 NFL draft.

Tim Lester was inducted into the Kentucky Pro Football Hall of Fame in 2018.

== Death ==
Lester died from complications of COVID-19 in January 2021, at the age of 52.
