= Toms River High School South =

High school in Ocean County, New Jersey, US

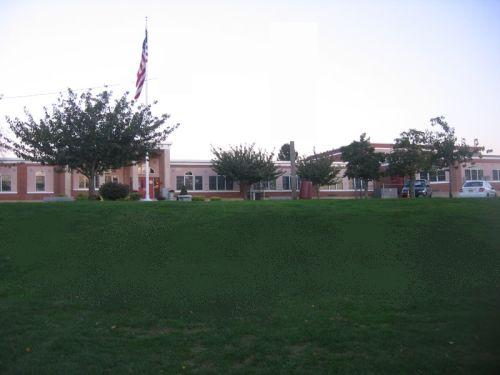

Location
- 55 Hyers Street; Toms River, New Jersey, Ocean County, New Jersey 08753; United States; 39.954646°N 74.19716°W

Information
- Type: Public high school
- Motto: Spirit, Tradition, Excellence and Pride
- Established: 1891
- School district: Toms River Regional Schools
- NCES School ID: 341623004724
- Principal: Kevin Raylman
- Faculty: 90.5 FTEs
- Grades: 9-12
- Enrollment: 1,463 (as of 2024–25)
- Student to teacher ratio: 16.2:1
- Colors: Maroon white
- Athletics conference: Shore Conference
- Mascot: Indian, Indian Princess, Super Maroon, and Spirit
- Team name: Indians
- Rival: Toms River High School North
- Publication: The Chieftain
- Website: www.trschools.com/hssouth/

Toms River High School South is a comprehensive four-year public high school, and was the first high school established in Toms River (formerly Dover Township) in Ocean County, in the U.S. state of New Jersey, serving students in ninth through twelfth grades as part of the Toms River Regional Schools.

The school day starts at 7:15 AM and lasts six hours and 20 minutes. Toms River high schools have some of the earliest daily closing high schools in New Jersey, closing at 1:35 PM every day.

As of the 2024–25 school year, the school had an enrollment of 1,463 students and 90.5 classroom teachers (on an FTE basis), for a student–teacher ratio of 16.2:1. There were 525 students (35.9% of enrollment) eligible for free lunch and 82 (5.6% of students) eligible for reduced-cost lunch.

The school colors are maroon and White. The school has four mascots: Indian, Indian Princess, Super Maroon, and Spirit. During the 2014–15 school year, the mascots were Indian XLVII, Princess XLVI, Super Maroon XXXVII, and Spirit XVI. The mascots appear at every football game of the High School South Indians, which also feature the longtime "Voice of the Indians", P. David Correll Jr., as public address announcer.

== History ==
The original Toms River High School graduated its first class in 1891 and the current building opened for students in 1951. In 1969, when the high school was found to be too small, a second high school, Toms River High School North was opened and South was appended onto the school's original name, and a third high school in the district, Toms River High School East, was opened in 1979.

== Awards, recognition and rankings ==
For the 1993–94 school year, Toms River Alternate School - High School South was named as a "Star School" by the New Jersey Department of Education, the highest honor that a New Jersey school can achieve.

The school was the 230th-ranked public high school in New Jersey out of 339 schools statewide in New Jersey Monthly magazine's September 2014 cover story on the state's "Top Public High Schools", using a new ranking methodology. The school had been ranked 229th in the state of 328 schools in 2012, after being ranked 269th in 2010 out of 322 schools listed. The magazine ranked the school 264th in 2008 out of 316 schools.

== Athletics ==
The Toms River High School South Indians compete in Division A South of the Shore Conference, an athletic conference comprised of public and private high schools in Monmouth and Ocean counties along the Jersey Shore. The league operates under the jurisdiction of the New Jersey State Interscholastic Athletic Association (NJSIAA). With 1,024 students in grades 10–12, the school was classified by the NJSIAA for the 2019–20 school year as Group III for most athletic competition purposes, which included schools with an enrollment of 761 to 1,058 students in that grade range. The school was classified by the NJSIAA as Group IV South for football for 2024–2026, which included schools with 890 to 1,298 students.

The school participates in a joint ice hockey team with Toms River High School East as the host school / lead agency. The co-op program operates under agreements scheduled to expire at the end of the 2023–24 school year.

The field hockey team won the South Jersey Group IV state sectional championship in 1975 and 1984, and won the South Jersey Group III title in 1991. The 1975 team won the Group IV state championship with a 2–0 win against Westfield High School in the championship game to finish the season with a 16–0–1 record, the only game the team didn't win being a scoreless tie.

The girls spring track team won the Group IV state championship in 1976 (as co-champion with Toms River High School North).

The football team won the NJSIAA state sectional championships in 1978 in South Jersey Group IV, in both 1983 and 1991 in South Jersey Group III and won in South Jersey Group V in 2015. The 1978 team defeated Cherry Hill High School East by a score of 16–6 to win the South Jersey Group IV state sectional championship. After Eastern Regional High School came back with a late touchdown to tie the game at 14–14 in regulation, the 1983 team won the South Jersey Group III sectional title by a score of 17–14 with an overtime field goal. In 2015, the team won the South Jersey Group V title with a 14–7 win against Williamstown High School in the tournament final. Each year, students, parents, teachers, alumni and administrators gather for the annual Toms River High School North vs. Toms River High School South football game. The game is considered to be the biggest event of the year for students. The annual rivalry began in 1972. In 2024, Toms River South lost by a score 41–0, the team's 24th loss in the previous 31 meetings of the schools, to bring the overall record to 26–26–1.

The boys' cross country team won the Group III state championship in 1980.

The baseball team won the Group III state championship in 1990 (vs. Pascack Hills High School), 1994 (vs. Hoboken High School), 1998 (vs. Millburn High School), 2002 (vs. Ramapo High School) and 2003 (vs. Cranford High School); the program's five state championships are tied for tenth-most in the state. With a three-run home run from Todd Frazier, the team won the Group III title by a score of 9–4 against Cranford in the championship game to finish the season with a 24–4 record.

The boys track team won the winter / indoor Group III state title in 1995.

The girls' soccer team won the Group III state championship in 2001 (against Ramapo High School in the finals) and 2002 (vs. Morris Knolls High School).

In 2009, the boys' soccer team upset Toms River High School North with a 4–3 overtime win in the state semifinals and went on to win the Group IV state championship for the first time in program history, with a 1–0 victory over Clifton High School in the final game of the tournament to finish the season with an 18–5–2 record.

The ice hockey team won the Public A state championship in 2010, won the McInnis Cup in 1996 and 1999, and won the Dowd Cup in 2020. The team won the Public A state title in 2010, having come into the tournament as a 16th seed, which is the lowest seed to ever win the state championship, having knocked off the number one seed Morris Knolls High School in the first round, and beat the number 3 seed Randolph High School in the finals.

The boys' wrestling team won the South Jersey Group III state sectional championship in 2013.

Toms River Regional Schools has denied requests to retire the Indian mascot as being racially insensitive, while supporters of the mascot claim that the "...team's identity is a tradition that honors and respects Native American people."

== Administration ==
The school's principal is Kevin Raylman. His administration team includes three assistant principals.

== Notable alumni ==
- Corey Albano (born 1975, class of 1993), former professional basketball player
- Don Browne (1943–2023), media executive who was president of Telemundo following a tenure at NBC News
- Kyle Driscoll (born 1994), professional baseball coach and former pitcher who is an assistant pitching coach for the St. Louis Cardinals
- Lew Elverson (1912–1997), college football player and coach, track and field coach, and college athletics administrator
- Jeff Frazier (born 1982), former professional baseball outfielder who played for the Detroit Tigers
- Todd Frazier (born 1986, class of 2004), third baseman who played for the New York Yankees and New York Mets
- Julio M. Fuentes (born 1946, class of 1964), Senior United States circuit judge of the United States Court of Appeals for the Third Circuit, who is the first Hispanic judge to serve the Third Circuit
- Heidi Hartmann (born 1945, class of 1963), feminist economist who is founder and president emerita of the Washington-based Institute for Women's Policy Research
- Gary Jobson (born c. 1951, class of 1969), sailor, television commentator and author who is Editor at Large of Sailing World and Cruising World magazines and President of the National Sailing Hall of Fame
- Leigh Lezark (born 1984, class of 2002), DJ
- Gia Maione (1941–2013, class of 1959), singer and wife of singer Louis Prima
- W. Steelman Mathis (1898–1981), politician who served in the New Jersey Senate from 1941 to 1942 and 1947 to 1966
- Annette Meyers (born 1934, class of 1951), mystery writer
- Christie Raleigh Crossley (born 1987), Paralympic swimmer who will represent the United States at the 2024 Summer Paralympics
- Norton A. Schwartz (born 1951), retired United States Air Force general who served as the 19th Chief of Staff of the Air Force from August 12, 2008, until his retirement in 2012
- Noël Valis (born 1945), writer, scholar and translator who is a Professor of Spanish at Yale University
- Albert W. Van Duzer (1917–1999, class of 1935), bishop of the Episcopal Diocese of New Jersey, serving from 1973 to 1982
