= Toms River High School East =

High school in Ocean County, New Jersey, US

Location
- 1225 Raider Way; Toms River, Ocean County, New Jersey 08753; United States
- 39.967813°N 74.14267°W

Information
- Type: Public
- Motto: "Nothing Greater, Than A Raider"
- Established: 1979
- School district: Toms River Regional Schools
- NCES School ID: 341623005919
- Principal: Erin Anders
- Faculty: 107.7 FTEs
- Grades: 9-12
- Enrollment: 1,444 (as of 2023–24)
- Student to teacher ratio: 13.4:1
- Colors: Black gray and Columbia blue
- Athletics conference: Shore Conference
- Team name: Raiders
- Website: www.trschools.com/hseast/

Toms River High School East is a comprehensive four-year public high school, the third high school built in Toms River in Ocean County, in the U.S. state of New Jersey, serving students in ninth through twelfth grades as part of the Toms River Regional Schools.

As of the 2023–24 school year, the school had an enrollment of 1,444 students and 107.7 classroom teachers (on an FTE basis), for a student–teacher ratio of 13.4:1. There were 309 students (21.4% of enrollment) eligible for free lunch and 66 (4.6% of students) eligible for reduced-cost lunch.

The school won several awards for its heating system, which utilizes heat generating lighting fixtures. Its school colors are black, gray and Columbia blue (blue was not an original color when HSE started). The school mascot is the Raider. The school day lasts six hours and 20 minutes. The Toms River high school day ends at 1:35 PM, one of the earliest daily closing time of any high schools in New Jersey.

== History ==
By 1974, the district was facing split sessions for students, as the district's first and second high schools, Toms River High School South and Toms River High School North, had a total of 4,600 students, nearly 50% above capacity. To address the overcrowding, a March 1975 bond referendum was proposed to raise $15 million—the largest ever in county history—for construction of a third high school, which was rejected by a margin of nearly 1,000 votes. Construction was finally approved in a May 1977 referendum authorizing a $10.9 million bond issue to construct the school.

The school opened in September 1979 on a 79-acre (32 ha) site in a building constructed at a cost $10.9 million (equivalent to $48.4 million in 2025). Opened at a time of rising energy prices, the building was designed so that each classroom had only two windows as a means to reduce heat loss through the glass.

== Awards, recognition and rankings ==
The school was the 171st-ranked public high school in New Jersey out of 339 schools statewide in New Jersey Monthly magazine's September 2014 cover story on the state's "Top Public High Schools", using a new ranking methodology. The school had been ranked 225th in the state of 328 schools in 2012, after being ranked 239th in 2010 out of 322 schools listed. The magazine ranked the school 204th in 2008 out of 316 schools. The school was ranked 205th in the magazine's September 2006 issue, which surveyed 316 schools across the state. In 2017, the school became the seventh school in the state to be selected by Character.org as a National School of Character.

== Athletics ==
The Toms River High School East Raiders compete in Division A South of the Shore Conference, an athletic conference comprised of public and private high schools in Monmouth and Ocean counties along the Jersey Shore. The league operates under the jurisdiction of the New Jersey State Interscholastic Athletic Association (NJSIAA). With 1,036 students in grades 10–12, the school was classified by the NJSIAA for the 2019–20 school year as Group III for most athletic competition purposes, which included schools with an enrollment of 761 to 1,058 students in that grade range. The school was classified by the NJSIAA as Group IV South for football for 2024–2026, which included schools with 890 to 1,298 students.

The school participates as the host school / lead agency in a joint ice hockey team with Toms River High School South. The co-op program operates under agreements scheduled to expire at the end of the 2023–24 school year.

The boys' soccer team won the 1985 South Jersey Group IV state sectional championship against Jackson Memorial High School and went on to win the Group IV state title with a 3–1 win against Westfield High School in the championship game to finish the season with a 19-5-1 record.

The girls' cross country team won the Group IV state championship in 1988 and 1996.

The girls' track team won the Group IV state indoor relay championship in 1990.

The 1997 ice hockey team won the Handchen Cup with a 5–4 win against River Dell High School.

The girls' bowling team won the overall state championship in 1997 and won the Group IV title in 2009. The 2009 team won the Group IV title with 2,829 pins, the highest score in the competition, and entered the Tournament of Champions as the top seed, before losing in the semifinals to forth-ranked Keyport High School.

The 2001 baseball team finished the season with a record of 29-2 after winning the Group IV state championship, defeating North Bergen High School by a score of 4–3 in the tournament final.

The football team won the Shore Conference championships in 2003, 2004, 2006, 2008, and 2009. The school's major rivalry is with the Mariners of Toms River High School North. Every Thanksgiving weekend, the football teams play in the annual "Battle of Bay Avenue."

The softball team won the 2007 South Jersey Group IV state sectional championship with a 5–2 win over Absegami High School.

== Lip Dub videos ==
Toms River High School East was recognized across the state and even the country for their Lip Dub 1 and Lip Dub 2 videos. The lip dub videos feature East students lip-syncing and dancing through the halls and campus of the school. The videos were created and produced by the Toms River Regional Schools TV Network and television production class. The students spent roughly three months planning Lip Dub 1, planning camera movement and timing out cues for the students who were lip-syncing in the video. Lip Dub 1 features about 150 students involved in many different sports, clubs and activities at East.

In that same school year, Lip Dub 1 received so much recognition that it inspired students and faculty at East to request a second lip dub be filmed. Lip Dub 2 involved over 400 students and faculty at East and was featured on News 12 New Jersey as well as local radio station WOBM

== Administration ==
The school's principal is Erin Anders. Her core administration team includes three assistant principals.

== Notable alumni ==
- Carolyn Blank (born 1988), retired soccer player who played for Sky Blue FC
- Rachel Bolan (born 1964, class of 1982), bass guitarist of Skid Row and Stone Sour
- Danny Clinch (born 1964, class of 1982), photographer and film director
- Ryan Doherty (born 1984), professional beach volleyball player who had been the first seven-foot-tall player in Minor League Baseball history
- Frankie Edgar (born 1981), professional MMA/UFC fighter and former UFC Lightweight Champion
- Brian Geraghty (born 1974), actor who appeared in the film The Hurt Locker and on TV on Boardwalk Empire
- Frank Giannetti (born 1968), defensive tackle who played in the NFL for the Indianapolis Colts
- Ted Gillen (born 1968), former professional soccer player who led the school soccer team to the 1985 Group IV state championship, and now is an assistant principal at the school and coaches the school's soccer team
- Lori Grifa (class of 1981), attorney who served as head of the New Jersey Department of Community Affairs
- Jeff Janiak (born 1976), vocalist of the British punk rock bands Discharge and Broken Bones
- Pavle Jovanovic (born 1977), bronze medal winner in the four-man bobsleigh at the FIBT World Championships 2004 who competed in the 2006 Winter Olympics in Turin
- Chris Konopka (born 1985), goalkeeper for the Philadelphia Union of Major League Soccer
- Joe Scott (born 1965), college basketball coach
- Daniel Van Pelt (born 1964), politician who represented the 9th legislative district in the New Jersey General Assembly from 2008 to 2009, when he resigned after being arrested in connection with Operation Bid Rig
