= Olanda Truitt =

American football player (born 1971)

No. 17, 80, 84, 89, 88
- Position: Wide receiver

Personal information
- Born: January 4, 1971 (age 55); Bessemer, Alabama, U.S.
- Listed height: 6 ft 0 in (1.83 m)
- Listed weight: 195 lb (88 kg)

Career information
- High school: A. H. Parker (Birmingham, Alabama)
- College: Pittsburgh; Mississippi State
- NFL draft: 1993: 5th round, 125th overall pick

Career history
- Los Angeles Raiders (1993)*; Minnesota Vikings (1993); Washington Redskins (1994–1995); Oakland Raiders (1996–1998)
- * Offseason or practice squad member only

Awards and highlights
- Second-team All-East (1990)

Career NFL statistics
- Receptions: 22
- Receiving yards: 374
- Receiving touchdowns: 3
- Stats at Pro Football Reference

Olanda Raynard Truitt (born January 4, 1971) is an American former professional football player who was a wide receiver in the National Football League (NFL) for the Minnesota Vikings, Washington Redskins, and Oakland Raiders. He played college football for the Pittsburgh Panthers and Mississippi State Bulldogs. Truitt was selected by the Raiders in the fifth round of the 1993 NFL draft, he was released prior to the regular season and signed on with the Vikings that same year. Truitt would return to play wide receiver and special teams for the Raiders three years later in 1996. He tallied a total of three receiving touchdowns, during his NFL career.
