= Toms River High School North =

High school in Ocean County, New Jersey, US

Location
- 1245 Old Freehold Road; Toms River, Ocean County, New Jersey 08753; United States; 39.982184°N 74.197203°W

Information
- Type: Public high school
- Established: 1969; 57 years ago
- School district: Toms River Regional Schools
- NCES School ID: 341623004722
- Principal: Edward W. Keller
- Faculty: 134.2 FTEs
- Grades: 9-12
- Enrollment: 1,861 (as of 2024–25)
- Student to teacher ratio: 13.9:1
- Colors: Navy blue and gold
- Athletics conference: Shore Conference
- Team name: Mariners
- Rival: Toms River High School South
- Nobel laureates: Maria Ressa
- Website: trschools.com/hsnorth/

Toms River High School North is a four-year comprehensive public high school, and was the second public high school established in Toms River, in Ocean County, in the U.S. state of New Jersey, operating as part of the Toms River Regional Schools. Toms River High School North is the largest of all schools in the Toms River Regional School district. The TRHSN mascot is the Mariner, and the school colors are navy blue and gold. The other high schools in the district are Toms River High School East and Toms River High School South.

As of 2020, the school day starts at 7:15 am and lasts six hours and 20 minutes. Toms River high schools have some of the earliest daily opening and closing high schools in New Jersey, closing at 1:35 pm every day. Parents lobbied for later high school start times in 2014, but the district found that the cost to purchase the additional buses and additional drivers necessary to accommodate the change would be prohibitive.

As of the 2024–25 school year, the school had an enrollment of 1,861 students and 134.2 classroom teachers (on an FTE basis), for a student–teacher ratio of 13.9:1. There were 759 students (40.8% of enrollment) eligible for free lunch and 131 (7.0% of students) eligible for reduced-cost lunch.

== History ==
Constructed at a cost of $3.9 million (equivalent to $33.8 million in 2025), the school opened in 1969 in order to alleviate overcrowding in the original high school (which was renamed as Toms River High School South), which was found to be too small to accommodate the fast-growing community. When the school opened it served students living north of Route 37, while those living south of that line would attend Toms River South, including those from the constituent districts of Beachwood, Pine Beach and South Toms River.

The first class to graduate wasn't until 1971, since all of the seniors were kept at TRHSS for the class of 1970.

== Awards, recognition and rankings ==
The school was the 154th-ranked public high school in New Jersey out of 339 schools statewide in New Jersey Monthly magazine's September 2014 cover story on the state's "Top Public High Schools", using a new ranking methodology. The school had been ranked 228th in the state of 328 schools in 2012, after being ranked 222nd in 2010 out of 322 schools listed. The magazine ranked the school 212th in 2008 out of 316 schools. The school was ranked 178th in the magazine's September 2006 issue, which surveyed 316 schools across the state.

== Athletics ==
The Toms River High School North Mariners compete in Division A South of the Shore Conference, an athletic conference comprised of public and private high schools in Monmouth and Ocean counties along the Jersey Shore. The league operates under the jurisdiction of the New Jersey State Interscholastic Athletic Association (NJSIAA). With 1,504 students in grades 10–12, the school was classified by the NJSIAA for the 2019–20 school year as Group IV for most athletic competition purposes, which included schools with an enrollment of 1,060 to 5,049 students in that grade range. The school was classified by the NJSIAA as Group V South for football for 2024–2026, which included schools with 1,333 to 2,324 students. Toms River North has had notable teams in football, including perennial powers in girls' swimming, boys' and girls' cross country, tennis and outdoor track teams.

The girls spring / outdoor track team won the Group IV state championship in 1976 (as co-champion with Toms River High School South).

The girls' cross country team won the Group IV state championship in 1978 and 2007.

The football team won the South Jersey Group IV state sectional championships in 1979, 1991, 1994, 1997 and 2007, and won the South Jersey Group V title in 2015. They also won the inaugural Group V state title in 2022 after an undefeated season. The 1979 team finished the season with a 9–2 record after using a successful two-point conversion to provide the 15–14 winning margin in the South Jersey Group IV championship game at Giants Stadium against a Brick Township High School team that came into the game undefeated and had beaten Toms River North 24–15 a week earlier in a conference playoff game. The 2007 team won the South Jersey Group IV sectional title with a 22–19 win against Mainland Regional High School to finish the season 12–0. After a 1–9 record in 2013, the team finished the 2015 season with an 11–1 record after winning the South Jersey Group V state championship, defeating Williamstown High School by a score of 14–7 in the tournament final.

In 2022, the Mariners won the Group V state title by a score of 28–7 against the Passaic Tech Bulldogs in the finals at Rutgers University's SHI Stadium to finish the season with a 14–0 record. In 2023, the Mariners repeated as Group V champions with a 23–13 win against Passaic Tech, ending the season with a 12–2 record, going undefeated against public schools and becoming the first public school team in state history to repeat as football state champions. Each year, students, parents, teachers, alumni, and administrators gather for the annual Toms River High School North vs. Toms River High School South football game, also known as the "Civil War". The game is considered to be the biggest event of the year for students. The annual rivalry began in the fall of 1972. In 2024, Toms River North won 41–0, the team's 24th win in the previous 31 meetings of the schools, to bring the overall record to 26–26–1.

The field hockey team won the South Jersey Group IV sectional title in 1980 and 1987, and won the Central Jersey Group IV title in 1987; the team won the Group IV state championship in 1987. In 2004, the team took the Central Jersey Group IV title, edging Shawnee High School 1–0 in the tournament final.

The boys' cross country team won Group IV state championships in 1982, 1986, 1987, 1989, 1990 and 2002. Under the tutelage of Matt Jelley, who was coach at Toms River North from 2000 until 2007 when he was hired to become coach at Temple University, the team won six county titles, a Shore Conference title, three South Jersey Group IV state titles, a Group IV state championship, and was ranked in the top 25 of the country four times reaching a high of 17th in 2004, with Jelley named by The Star-Ledger as its coach of the year for cross country in 2001.

The boys' soccer team finished the 1983 season with a record of 18–6–1, having earned the South Jersey, Group IV sectional title as the tenth seed with a 3–1 win against Vineland High School and came back from a two-goal deficit at halftime to win the state Group IV title in 1983 with a 3–2 win over Kearny High School in the tournament final played at Princeton University. The team earned the South, Group IV sectional title in 2004 with a 2–1 victory against Shawnee High School.

The boys bowling team won the overall state championship in 1987.

The boys' wrestling team won the South Jersey Group IV state sectional title in 1990.

The ice hockey team won the overall state championship in 1993. From 2004 to 2006 the men's ice hockey team was considered a top public power. The Mariners finished the 2004–05 season with a 17–4–1 record and were Shore Conference Champions but were ineligible for state playoffs due to receiving three disqualifications (game ejections) in regular season play. In the 2005–06 season, Kevin Raylman took over as head coach of the program, while the team was in a very competitive, predominantly private school division, they were able to compile a 19–8–2 record. In the state tournament, the Mariners received the #3 rank in public schools and were able to make it to the semi-finals, where they lost to eventual state champions Randolph High School, 3–1.

The competition cheerleading squad, led by Ida Clendenin, has won the 1995, 1996, 1997, 1998, 1999 and 2001 Ocean County championships, and was the 1999 NJCCA State Champion Stunt Group and the 1999 NCA Myrtle Beach Spring Classic champions.

The girls' bowling team won the overall state championship in 1996 and won the Group IV title in 2018, 2019 and 2020. The team won the Tournament of Champions in 2018 and 2019. The 2019 team won the Group IV state title with 2,858 pins, the highest in the competition, and went into the Tournament of Champions as the top seed, defeating runner-up Freehold Township High School to win the program's second straight ToC title.

The girls' gymnastics team has won the team state championship in 1997, 1998 and 2000; the three titles are tied for the most of any public school in the state.

The girls' basketball team won the Group IV state championship in 2000, defeating Bloomfield High School by a score of 50–48 in the tournament final. The team won the 2000 South Jersey, Group IV state sectional championship with a 63–42 win. The team took the title again in 2004 with a one-point victory against Absegami High School in the tournament final.

The baseball team won the state championship in both 2008 and 2009, coached since the early 1990s by Ted Schelmay. The team won the 2009 South Jersey Group IV title with an 8–6 win over Cherokee High School in a game in which Cherokee committed nine errors in the field.

The school's girls' lacrosse team won division championships in 2009 through 2011, led by Tatum Coffey, who scored 123 goals and 65 assists in her senior year.

The school's marching band, the Toms River North Marching Mariners, were Tournament of Bands Region 7 and New Jersey state champions in the 3A class in the 2023 season.

== RWJBarnabas Health Arena ==
The RWJBarnabas Health Arena is a public arena connected to the school. The centerpiece of the Toms River Regional School District, the facility opened on June 19, 2003, as the Ritacco Center, named for a long-time district administrator. It has had many sponsorships and name changes since its opening, including the Poland Springs Arena and the Pine Belt Arena. The 3,500-seat facility received its current name, the RWJBarnabas Health Arena, under the terms of a five-year deal reached in December 2017 under which the district will be paid $600,000 for the naming rights.

== Administration ==
The school's principal is Edward W. Keller. His core administration team includes three assistant principals.

Keller was named the school's principal in July 2011, replacing James Hauenstein who was promoted to an Assistant Superintendent. Keller had previously been principal at North Dover Elementary School and before that at West Dover.

== Notable alumni ==
- Rich Alercio (born 1965), college football coach who was head coach of the Castleton Spartans football team
- Darian Barnes (born 1980), former NFL and UFL football player
- Alex Blackwell (born 1970), basketball player who played in the NBA for the Los Angeles Lakers
- Sean Cashman (born 1987), baseball coach in the Texas Rangers organization who was head coach of the Saint Peter's Peacocks during the 2013 season
- Syma Chowdhry, television host, reporter, producer, news writer, model and actress, who is a television news reporter in Detroit at WXYZ-TV
- Cam Dineen (born 1998), professional ice hockey defenceman for the Arizona Coyotes of the National Hockey League
- Jerry Dipoto (born 1968), former Major League Baseball relief pitcher who is president of baseball operations for the Seattle Mariners
- Zachary Dougherty (born 2001), civic activist, March for Our Lives organizer and director of the Robert C. Byrd Center for Congressional History and Education
- JP Flavin (born 1998), long-distance runner
- Mark Leiter Jr. (born 1991), Major League Baseball pitcher for the Chicago Cubs
- Ron Marinaccio (born 1995), professional baseball pitcher for the New York Yankees
- Demetri Martin (born 1973, class of 1991), Emmy Award-nominated comedian, actor and writer, who is host of the Comedy Central program Important Things with Demetri Martin
- Piper Perabo (born 1976, class of 1994), actress, whose film credits include Coyote Ugly, Cheaper by the Dozen
- Maria Ressa (born 1963), Filipino journalist, who was Time Person of the Year in 2018 and recipient of the Nobel Peace Prize in 2021
- Cheryl Spector (1958–2007), gay, lesbian, bisexual and transgender activist
