= 1995 Cincinnati Bengals season =

NFL team season

- Head coach: Dave Shula
- Home stadium: Riverfront Stadium

Results
- Record: 7–9
- Division place: 2nd AFC Central
- Playoffs: Did not qualify
- Pro Bowlers: QB Jeff Blake; WR Carl Pickens

The 1995 Cincinnati Bengals season was the team's 28th year in professional football and its 26th with the National Football League.

With Jeff Blake firmly entrenched as the starting quarterback, the Bengals won their first two games. However, the Bengals would lose their next two, heading into a rematch with Don Shula and the Miami Dolphins, in which the Bengals also lost, 26–23. The Bengals went on to play fairly well the rest of the season, but could not avoid their fifth straight losing season, ending with a 7–9 win–loss record.

One of the season's biggest disappointments was running back Ki-Jana Carter who the Bengals took with first overall pick out of Penn State. Carter would suffer a knee injury in his first preseason game, forcing him to miss his entire rookie season. He would never fully recover, in an injury plagued career.

== Offseason ==
=== NFL draft ===
1995 Cincinnati Bengals draft
Round	Pick	Player	Position	College	Notes
1	1	Ki-Jana Carter	Running back	Penn State	
3	69	Melvin Tuten	Offensive tackle	Syracuse	
4	102	Sam Shade	Defensive back	Alabama	
5	139	David Dunn	Wide receiver	Fresno State	
6	175	Ryan Grigson	Offensive tackle	Purdue	
7	213	John Walsh	Quarterback	BYU	
Made roster

== Personnel ==
=== Staff ===
1995 Cincinnati Bengals staff
Front office: President – Mike Brown; Head coaches: Head Coach – Dave Shula; Offensive coaches: Offensive Coordinator – Bruce Coslet; Quarterbacks – Ken Anderson; Running Backs – Jim Anderson; Tight Ends – Gary Moeller; Offensive Line – Paul Alexander; Offensive Assistant/Wide Receivers – John Garrett	Defensive coaches: Defensive Coordinator – Larry Peccatiello; Defensive Line – Bobby DePaul; Linebackers – Joe Pascale; Defensive Backs – Ron Meeks; Defensive Assistant – Tim Krumrie; Special teams coaches: Special Teams – Joe Wessel; Strength and conditioning: Strength and Conditioning – Kim Wood

=== Roster ===
1995 Cincinnati Bengals roster
Quarterbacks (QB): 8 Jeff Blake; 7 David Klingler; 10 John Walsh; Running backs (RB): 21 Eric Bieniemy; 38 Jason Burns; 46 Jeff Cothran FB; 28 Harold Green; 36 James Joseph; Wide receivers (WR): 18 Thomas Bailey; 80 David Dunn KR; 84 Jeff Hill KR; 81 Carl Pickens; 16 David Rhodes; 86 Darnay Scott; Tight ends (TE): 82 Tony McGee; 87 Troy Sadowski; 88 Derek Ware	Offensive linemen (OL): 65 Darrick Brilz C; 75 Anthony Brown G; 72 Scott Brumfield G; 71 Ray Forsythe G; 66 Dan Jones G/C; 62 Todd Kalis G; 76 Trent Pollard G; 77 Kevin Sargent T; 61 Melvin Tuten G/T; 63 Joe Walter T; Defensive linemen (DL): 92 John Copeland DE; 98 Todd Kelly DE; 96 Alfred Oglesby DT; 95 Keith Rucker DT; 70 Artie Smith DE; 79 Ramondo Stallings DT/DE; 67 Kimo von Oelhoffen DT; 99 Dan Wilkinson DT	Linebackers (LB): 55 Andre Collins OLB; 57 Kevin Jefferson MLB; 56 Ricardo McDonald OLB; 52 Randy Neal OLB; 51 Steve Tovar MLB; 91 Brett Wallerstedt MLB; Defensive backs (DB): 45 Adrian Hardy CB; 25 Rod Jones CB; 24 Roger Jones CB; 23 Corey Sawyer CB; 35 Sam Shade SS; 30 Chris Shelling CB; 27 Bracy Walker SS; 37 Leonard Wheeler CB/FS; 31 Darryl Williams FS; Special teams (ST): 11 Lee Johnson P; 9 Doug Pelfrey K; 59 Greg Truitt LS	Practice squad none Reserve: 74 Rich Braham G/C (IR); 43 Mike Brim CB (IR); 32 Ki-Jana Carter RB (IR); 90 Gerald Collins LB (IR); 50 James Francis LB (IR); 64 Bruce Kozerski G (IR); 85 Tim McGee WR (IR); 53 active, 7 inactive Rookies in italics

== Regular season ==
=== Schedule ===
Week	Date	Opponent	Result	Record	Venue	Attendance
1	September 3	at Indianapolis Colts	W 24–21 (OT)	1–0	RCA Dome	42,445
2	September 10	**Jacksonville Jaguars**	**W** 24–17	2–0	Riverfront Stadium	48,318
3	September 17	at Seattle Seahawks	**L** 21–24	2–1	Kingdome	39,492
4	September 24	**Houston Oilers**	**L** 28–38	2–2	Riverfront Stadium	46,332
5	October 1	Miami Dolphins	**L** 23–26	2–3	Riverfront Stadium	52,671
6	October 8	at Tampa Bay Buccaneers	**L** 16–19	2–4	Tampa Stadium	41,732
7	Bye					
8	October 19	at **Pittsburgh Steelers**	**W** 27–9	3–4	Three Rivers Stadium	56,684
9	October 29	**Cleveland Browns**	**L** 26–29 (OT)	3–5	Riverfront Stadium	58,639
10	November 5	Oakland Raiders	**L** 17–20	3–6	Riverfront Stadium	51,265
11	November 12	at **Houston Oilers**	**W** 32–25	4–6	Houston Astrodome	32,998
12	November 19	**Pittsburgh Steelers**	**L** 31–49	4–7	Riverfront Stadium	54,636
13	November 26	at **Jacksonville Jaguars**	**W** 17–13	5–7	Jacksonville Municipal Stadium	68,249
14	December 3	at Green Bay Packers	**L** 10–24	5–8	Lambeau Field	60,318
15	December 10	Chicago Bears	**W** 16–10	6–8	Riverfront Stadium	38,642
16	December 17	at **Cleveland Browns**	**L** 10–26	6–9	Cleveland Municipal Stadium	55,875
17	December 24	Minnesota Vikings	**W** 27–24	7–9	Riverfront Stadium	34,568
Note: Intra-division opponents are in **bold** text.

=== Season summary ===
==== Week 2: vs Jacksonville Jaguars ====
Week Two: Cincinnati Bengals vs Jacksonville Jaguars

Quarter	1	2	3	4	Total
Jaguars	7	0	3	7	**17**
**Bengals**	3	7	7	7	**24**

at Riverfront Stadium, Cincinnati, Ohio

- Date: September 10, 1995
- Game time: 1:00 p.m. EST
- Game weather: Overcast, 67 °F (19 °C)
- Game attendance: 48,318
- TV announcers (NBC): Don Criqui and Beasley Reece
- Recap

Game information

**First quarter**

- CIN – Doug Pelfrey 27-yard field goal, 9:51. Bengals 3–0. **Drive: 11 plays, 27 yards, 5:09.**
- JAC – Randy Jordan 71-yard pass from Steve Beuerlein (Mike Hollis kick), 8:43. Jaguars 7–3. **Drive: 3 plays, 77 yards, 1:08.**

**Second quarter**

- CIN – Melvin Tuten 3-yard pass from Jeff Blake (Doug Pelfrey kick), 0:16. Bengals 10–7. **Drive: 9 plays, 64 yards, 3:08.**

**Third quarter**

- JAC – Mike Hollis 29-yard field goal, 12:18. Tied 10–10. **Drive: 5 plays, -7 yards, 0:25.**
- CIN – Harold Green 10-yard run (Doug Pelfrey kick), 8:14. Bengals 17–10. **Drive: 9 plays, 71 yards, 4:04.**

**Fourth quarter**

- CIN – Carl Pickens 68-yard pass from Jeff Blake (Doug Pelfrey kick), 14:04. Bengals 24–10. **Drive: 2 plays, 70 yards, 0:48.**
- JAC – Mark Brunell 8-yard run (Mike Hollis kick), 7:20. Bengals 24–17. **Drive: 8 plays, 65 yards, 4:15.**

Top passers

- JAC – Steve Beuerlein – 4/12, 98 yards, TD
- CIN – Jeff Blake – 20/30, 247 yards, 2 TD

Top rushers

- JAC – Randy Jordan – 20 rushes, 64 yards
- CIN – Eric Bieniemy – 14 rushes, 65 yards

Top receivers

- JAC – Randy Jordan – 3 receptions, 80 yards, TD
- CIN – Carl Pickens – 5 receptions, 102 yards, TD

==== Week 16 at Cleveland Browns ====
Week 16: Cincinnati Bengals at Cleveland Browns

Quarter	1	2	3	4	Total
Bengals	0	3	0	7	**10**
**Browns**	0	17	6	3	**26**

at Cleveland Municipal Stadium, Cleveland, Ohio

- Date: December 17, 1995
- Game time: 1:00 p.m. EDT
- Game weather: Overcast, 29 °F (−2 °C)
- Game attendance: 55,875
- TV announcers (NBC): Charlie Jones, Randy Cross and Jim Gray

Game information

**First quarter**

**Second quarter**

**Third quarter**

**Fourth quarter**

Top passers

- CIN – Jeff Blake – 22/46, 257 yards, INT
- CLE – Vinny Testaverde – 22/23, 241 yards, 2 TD

Top rushers

- CIN – Harold Green – 7 rushes, 33 yards
- CLE – Earnest Byner – 31 rushes, 121 yards

Top receivers

- CIN – Carl Pickens – 5 receptions, 90 yards
- CLE – Earnest Byner – 7 receptions, 36 yards

=== Standings ===
AFC Central
	W	L	T	PCT	PF	PA	STK
^{(2)} Pittsburgh Steelers	11	5	0	.688	407	327	L1
Cincinnati Bengals	7	9	0	.438	349	374	W1
Houston Oilers	7	9	0	.438	348	324	W2
Cleveland Browns	5	11	0	.313	289	356	L1
Jacksonville Jaguars	4	12	0	.250	275	404	W1

== Team leaders ==
=== Passing ===
Player	Att	Comp	Yds	TD	INT	Rating
Jeff Blake	567	326	3822	28	17	82.1

=== Rushing ===
Player	Att	Yds	YPC	Long	TD
Harold Green	171	661	3.9	23	2
Eric Bieniemy	98	381	3.9	27	3

=== Receiving ===
Player	Rec	Yds	Avg	Long	TD
Carl Pickens	99	1234	12.5	68	17

=== Defensive ===
Player	Tackles	Sacks	INTs	FF	FR
Steve Tovar	99	1.0	1	2	0
John Copeland	61	9.0	0	2	0
Bracy Walker	85	0.0	4	1	2

=== Kicking and punting ===
Player	FGA	FGM	FG%	XPA	XPM	XP%	Points
Doug Pelfrey	36	29	80.6%	34	34	100.0%	121

Player	Punts	Yards	Long	Blkd	Avg.
Lee Johnson	68	2861	61	0	42.1

=== Special teams ===
Player	KR	KRYards	KRAvg	KRLong	KRTD	PR	PRYards	PRAvg	PRLong	PRTD
David Dunn	50	1092	21.8	45	0	0	0	0.0	0	0
Corey Sawyer	2	50	25.0	28	0	9	58	6.4	21	0

== Awards and records ==
=== Conference Leaders ===
- Carl Pickens, Led AFC, Receptions, (99)
- Carl Pickens, Led AFC, Touchdowns, (17)

=== Franchise Records ===
- Carl Pickens, Franchise Record, Most Touchdowns in One Season, (17),
- Doug Pelfrey, Franchise Record, Most Field Goals in One Season, (29),
- Doug Pelfrey, Franchise Record, Most Points in One Season, (121),

=== Milestones ===
- Carl Pickens, 2nd 1,000 yard receiving season (1,234 yards)
- David Dunn, 1st 1,000-yard return season
