= 1996 Cincinnati Bengals season =

NFL team season

- Head coach: Dave Shula (fired October 21, 1–6 record); Bruce Coslet (interim; 7–2 record)
- Home stadium: Cinergy Field

Results
- Record: 8–8
- Division place: 3rd AFC Central
- Playoffs: Did not qualify
- Pro Bowlers: WR Carl Pickens; CB Ashley Ambrose

The 1996 Cincinnati Bengals season was the franchise's 29th in professional football and its 27th with the National Football League. The Dave Shula era came to a sudden end when he was fired after a 1–6 start, as Jeff Blake struggled with turnovers. Former Bengals tight end Bruce Coslet, the team's offensive coordinator and a former New York Jets head coach, would replace Shula as head coach. The move paid off right away as the Bengals won the first three games under Coslet. After losing two of their next three games, the Bengals closed the year with three straight wins to finish with an 8–8 record. One bright spot was that wide receiver Carl Pickens became the first member of the Bengals to have 100 receptions in a season.

== Offseason ==
=== NFL draft ===
1996 Cincinnati Bengals draft
Round	Pick	Player	Position	College	Notes
1	10	Willie Anderson *	Offensive tackle	Auburn	
2	39	Marco Battaglia	Tight end	Rutgers	
3	69	Ken Blackman	Guard	Illinois	
4	108	Jevon Langford	Defensive end	Oklahoma State	
5	144	Greg Myers	Defensive back	Colorado State	
6	178	Tom Tumulty	Linebacker	Pittsburgh	
7	219	Rod Jones	Offensive tackle	Kansas	
Made roster * Made at least one Pro Bowl during career

=== Undrafted free agents ===
1996 Undrafted free agents of note
Player	Position	College
Nick Ferguson	Safety	Georgia Tech
Chris Hetherington	Fullback	Yale
Damon Huard	Quarterback	Washington
Tim Morabito	Defensive tackle	Boston College

== Personnel ==
=== Staff ===
1996 Cincinnati Bengals staff
Front office: President – Mike Brown; Head coaches: Head Coach – Dave Shula; Offensive coaches: Offensive Coordinator – Bruce Coslet; Quarterbacks – Ken Anderson; Running Backs – Jim Anderson; Wide Receivers – John Garrett; Tight Ends – Gary Moeller; Offensive Line – Paul Alexander	Defensive coaches: Defensive Coordinator – Larry Peccatiello; Defensive Line – Tim Krumrie; Linebackers – Joe Pascale; Defensive Backs – Ron Meeks; Staff Assistant – Bobby DePaul; Special teams coaches: Special Teams – Joe Wessel; Strength and conditioning: Strength and Conditioning – Kim Wood

=== Roster ===
1996 Cincinnati Bengals roster
Quarterbacks (QB): 8 Jeff Blake; 12 Kerry Joseph; 4 Erik Wilhelm; Running backs (RB): 21 Eric Bieniemy; 32 Ki-Jana Carter; 46 Jeff Cothran FB; 20 Garrison Hearst; 44 Brian Milne FB; Wide receivers (WR): 80 David Dunn; 84 Jeff Hill KR; 85 James Hundon KR; 81 Carl Pickens; 86 Darnay Scott; Tight ends (TE): 89 Marco Battaglia; 82 Tony McGee; 87 Troy Sadowski	Offensive linemen (OL): 71 Willie Anderson T; 66 Ken Blackman G; 74 Rich Braham G/C; 65 Darrick Brilz C; 75 Anthony Brown T; 62 Brock Gutierrez C; 60 Rod Jones G; 76 Trent Pollard G; 61 Melvin Tuten T; 63 Joe Walter T; Defensive linemen (DL): 92 John Copeland DE; 90 Tim Johnson DT; 94 Jevon Langford DE; 93 Tim Morabito DT; 70 Artie Smith DE; 79 Ramondo Stallings DE; 67 Kimo von Oelhoffen DT; 99 Dan Wilkinson DT	Linebackers (LB): 55 Andre Collins OLB; 51 Gerald Dixon OLB; 50 James Francis OLB; 56 Ricardo McDonald OLB; 52 Randy Neal OLB; 53 Tom Tumulty MLB; Defensive backs (DB): 33 Ashley Ambrose CB; 25 Rod Jones CB; 24 Roger Jones CB; 31 Greg Myers FS; 26 Bo Orlando FS; 23 Corey Sawyer; 35 Sam Shade SS; 22 Jimmy Spencer CB; 27 Bracy Walker SS; 37 Leonard Wheeler CB; Special teams (ST): 11 Lee Johnson P; 9 Doug Pelfrey K; 59 Greg Truitt LS	Practice squad: 83 Kevin Jordan WR; -- Stephen Pitts RB; 17 Gunnard Twyner WR; 98 Thomas Meyer DE; Reserve: 72 Scott Brumfield G (IR); 68 Joel Davis G (Military); 40 Deland McCullough RB (IR); 77 Kevin Sargent T (IR); 51 Steve Tovar LB (IR); 91 Brett Wallerstedt LB (IR); 53 active, 6 inactive, 4 practice squad Rookies in italics

== Regular season ==
=== Schedule ===
Week	Date	Opponent	Result	Record	Venue	Attendance
1	September 1	at St. Louis Rams	**L** 16–26	0–1	Trans World Dome	62,659
2	September 8	at San Diego Chargers	**L** 14–27	0–2	Jack Murphy Stadium	55,880
3	September 15	New Orleans Saints	**W** 30–15	1–2	Cinergy Field	45,412
4	Bye					
5	September 29	Denver Broncos	**L** 10–14	1–3	Cinergy Field	51,798
6	October 6	**Houston Oilers**	**L** 27–30 (OT)	1–4	Cinergy Field	44,680
7	October 13	at **Pittsburgh Steelers**	**L** 10–20	1–5	Three Rivers Stadium	58,875
8	October 20	at San Francisco 49ers	**L** 21–28	1–6	3Com Park	63,218
9	October 27	**Jacksonville Jaguars**	**W** 28–21	2–6	Cinergy Field	45,890
10	November 3	at **Baltimore Ravens**	**W** 24–21	3–6	Memorial Stadium	60,743
11	November 10	**Pittsburgh Steelers**	**W** 34–24	4–6	Cinergy Field	57,265
12	November 17	at Buffalo Bills	**L** 17–31	4–7	Rich Stadium	75,549
13	November 24	Atlanta Falcons	**W** 41–31	5–7	Cinergy Field	44,868
14	December 1	at **Jacksonville Jaguars**	**L** 27–30	5–8	Jacksonville Municipal Stadium	57,408
15	December 8	**Baltimore Ravens**	**W** 21–14	6–8	Cinergy Field	43,022
16	December 15	at **Houston Oilers**	**W** 21–13	7-8	Houston Astrodome	15,131
17	December 22	Indianapolis Colts	**W** 31–24	8-8	Cinergy Field	49,389
Note: Intra-division opponents are in **bold** text.

=== Standings ===
AFC Central
	W	L	T	PCT	PF	PA	STK
^{(3)} Pittsburgh Steelers	10	6	0	.625	344	257	L2
^{(5)} Jacksonville Jaguars	9	7	0	.563	325	335	W5
Cincinnati Bengals	8	8	0	.500	372	369	W3
Houston Oilers	8	8	0	.500	345	319	W1
Baltimore Ravens	4	12	0	.250	371	441	L3

== Team leaders ==
=== Passing ===
Player	Att	Comp	Yds	TD	INT	Rating
Jeff Blake	549	308	3624	24	14	80.3

=== Rushing ===
Player	Att	Yds	YPC	Long	TD
Garrison Hearst	225	847	3.8	24	0
Ki-Jana Carter	91	264	2.9	31	8

=== Receiving ===
Player	Rec	Yds	Avg	Long	TD
Carl Pickens	100	1180	11.8	61	12

=== Defensive ===
Player	Tackles	Sacks	INTs	FF	FR
Steve Tovar	104	3.0	4	0	0
Dan Wilkinson	44	6.5	1	0	1
Ashley Ambrose	50	2.0	8	1	0

=== Kicking and punting ===
Player	FGA	FGM	FG%	XPA	XPM	XP%	Points
Doug Pelfrey	28	23	82.1%	41	41	100.0%	110

Player	Punts	Yards	Long	Blkd	Avg.
Lee Johnson	80	3630	67	1	45.4

=== Special teams ===
Player	KR	KRYards	KRAvg	KRLong	KRTD	PR	PRYards	PRAvg	PRLong	PRTD
David Dunn	35	782	22.3	90	1	7	54	7.7	20	0
Corey Sawyer	12	241	20.1	33	0	15	117	7.8	62	0

== Awards and records ==
- Carl Pickens, Franchise Record, Most Receptions in One Season, 100 Receptions
- Carl Pickens, Led AFC, Receptions, 100 Receptions

=== Milestones ===
- Carl Pickens, 3rd 1000 Yard Receiving Season, 1,180 yards
