= History of the Cincinnati Bengals =

American professional football team history

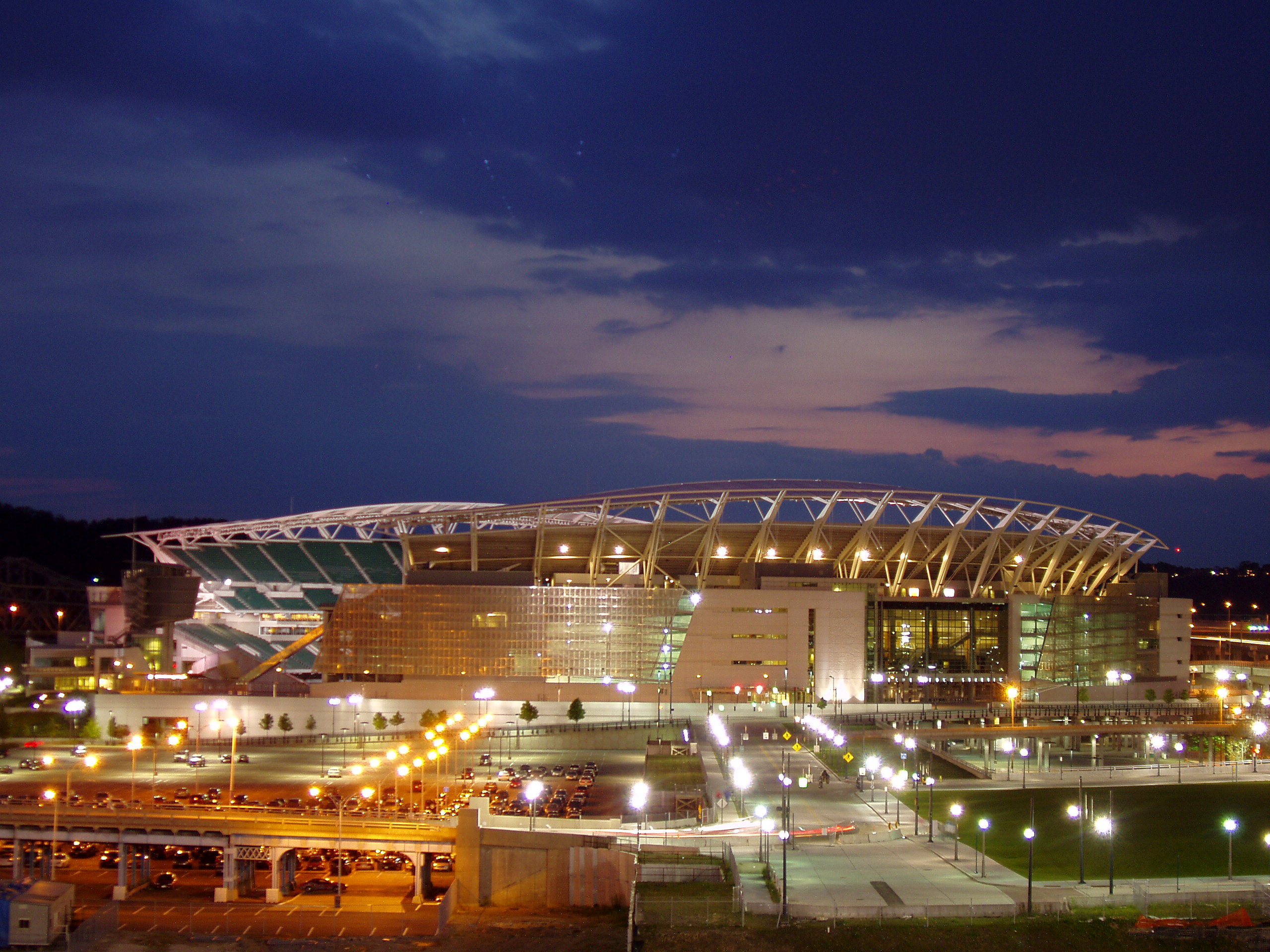
Paycor Stadium in Cincinnati, home of the Bengals.

The Cincinnati Bengals are a professional football franchise in the National Football League. Since starting off as an expansion franchise in the American Football League in 1968, they have appeared in three Super Bowls, but lost all three times, twice to the San Francisco 49ers and once to the Los Angeles Rams.

== Origins ==
Former Cleveland Browns head coach Paul Brown began planning for the creation of the Bengals franchise in 1965, and Cincinnati's city council approved the construction of Riverfront stadium in 1966. On May 23, 1967, Cincinnati was granted a franchise in the American Football League. The franchise was sold to a Cincinnati-based ownership group led by Brown, who had an ownership share of 10%. The other investors included Austin E. Knowlton who was the largest shareholder with 30%, John Sawyer with 20%, The Cincinnati Enquirer with 11% and seven others who had a combined ownership share of 29%.

As a founder and head coach of the Cleveland Browns from 1946 to 1962, Brown led his team to a .759 winning percentage and seven championships, which includes four championships earned while a member of the All-America Football Conference. The Browns were champions of that league in each of the four years it existed. When the AAFC folded after the 1949 season, the Browns, as well as the San Francisco 49ers and the first incarnation of the Baltimore Colts, were absorbed into the National Football League.

Brown became a recognized innovator for his approach to training, game planning, and the passing game. However, he was only a minority owner of the Browns and lacked the resources to buy out the rest of the ownership group. In 1961, businessman Art Modell assumed control of the team and on January 9, 1963, Modell controversially fired Brown. Many believe that Modell had tired of complaints of Brown's autocratic style; others claim it was Brown's decision to trade for Syracuse University's Heisman Trophy-winning running back Ernie Davis, who was drafted by the Washington Redskins, without Modell's knowledge. However, Davis was diagnosed with leukemia shortly afterward. Brown didn't want to play Davis; Modell insisted he could play. The relationship between Paul Brown and Art Modell, which was never warm to begin with, deteriorated further. Davis died on May 18, 1963.

By 1966, Paul Brown wanted to become involved in professional football again. James A. Rhodes, then the governor of Ohio, convinced Brown that Ohio needed a second team. As Columbus was already home to the Ohio State Buckeyes football program, Cincinnati was deemed the only realistic home for a second professional football team. Brown initially sought a franchise in the National Football League but had been rebuffed, in no small part because Cincinnati did not have an adequate facility. The city's largest football venue then in place, the University of Cincinnati’s Nippert Stadium, seated only 28,000 people, nowhere near the minimum 50,000 capacity the league required for prospective expansion teams. The NFL deemed it unsuitable even for temporary use.

Although he was only the third-largest shareholder, Brown became the public face of the team. He was named general manager and head coach, with the same total authority over the football side of the operation he had held for his first 15 years in Cleveland. He was also given the right to represent the team at league meetings and exercise its voting rights. Brown named the team the Bengals "to give it a link with past professional football in Cincinnati." The name honored an earlier Bengals team that played from 1937 to 1941, most notably in the second and third American Football Leagues. Brown knew the original Bengals had made a good account of themselves on the field. Most notably, while playing as an independent team in 1938, the original Bengals defeated the Chicago Bears and tied the Chicago Cardinals in exhibition games. Possibly as an swipe at Modell, Paul Brown chose the exact shade of burnt orange used by his former team, with black as the secondary color. Brown chose a very simple logo: the word "BENGALS" in black lettering.

A turning point came in 1966 when the American Football League agreed to a merger with its older and more established rival. Merger negotiations had been complicated by several factors, one being that members of the United States Congress were seeking guarantees that any merger would include all existing AFL teams. Under pressure from Congress, NFL commissioner Pete Rozelle had promised that professional football would be maintained in each of the twenty-three markets where it then existed. There were a total of 24 franchises in the two leagues at the time (fifteen in the NFL and nine in the AFL), but the powerful congressional delegation of Louisiana led by Senator Russell Long and Congressman Hale Boggs had further insisted on an NFL franchise in New Orleans in return for their support. As a result, the New Orleans Saints became the NFL's sixteenth franchise in 1967.

Having just stocked the Saints' roster, the NFL's owners did not want to risk having the talent pool of their own league becoming further diluted by way of another expansion draft. They also realized that an odd number of teams would unbalance the schedule. The NFL owners quickly agreed that the AFL should add another team. From the AFL's perspective, adding another team was highly desirable because the guarantee of an eventual place in the NFL meant the league could charge a steep expansion fee of $10 million – 400 times the $25,000 the original eight owners paid when they founded the league in 1960. The cash from the transaction provided the American Football League with the funds needed to pay the indemnities required to be paid by the AFL to the NFL, as stipulated by the merger agreement.

Prior to the merger being announced, Paul Brown had not seriously considered joining the American Football League, and was not a supporter of what he openly regarded to be an inferior competition, once famously stating that "I didn't pay ten million dollars to be in the AFL." However, with the announcement of the merger, Brown realized that the AFL expansion franchise would likely be his only realistic path back into the NFL in the short term. Brown ultimately acquiesced to joining the AFL when after learning that the team was guaranteed to become an NFL franchise after the merger was completed in 1970, provided a larger stadium was completed by then. An additional consideration was that the AFL was willing to allow Cincinnati to play at Nippert Stadium for the team's two pre-merger seasons, buying them time to find another stadium.

Ultimately, the stadium issue was settled in no small part because the Cincinnati Reds of Major League Baseball were also in need of a facility to replace the antiquated Crosley Field, which they had used since 1912. Parking nightmares had plagued the park as far back as the 1950s, the little park lacked modern amenities, and New York City, which after 1957 had lost both their National League teams, the Dodgers and the Giants to Los Angeles and San Francisco, respectively, was actively courting Powel Crosley. However, Crosley was adamant that the Reds remain in Cincinnati and tolerated the mounting problems with the Crosley Field location, which were increased with the Millcreek Expressway (I-75) project that ran alongside the park.

With assistance from Ohio governor James A. Rhodes, Hamilton County and the Cincinnati city council agreed to build a single multi-purpose facility on the dilapidated riverfront section of the city. The new facility had to be ready by the opening of the 1970 NFL season and was officially named Riverfront Stadium, which was its working title.

With the completion of the merger in 1970, the Cleveland Browns were moved to the AFL-based American Football Conference. Unexpected victories for AFL teams in Super Bowls III and IV had persuaded NFL owners, starting with Art Modell, to re-consider the question of divisional alignments and ultimately led to the Browns and Bengals both being placed in the AFC Central. An instant rivalry was born, fueled initially by Paul Brown's rivalry with Modell. The Bengals played their inaugural season in 1968.

== The first two seasons ==
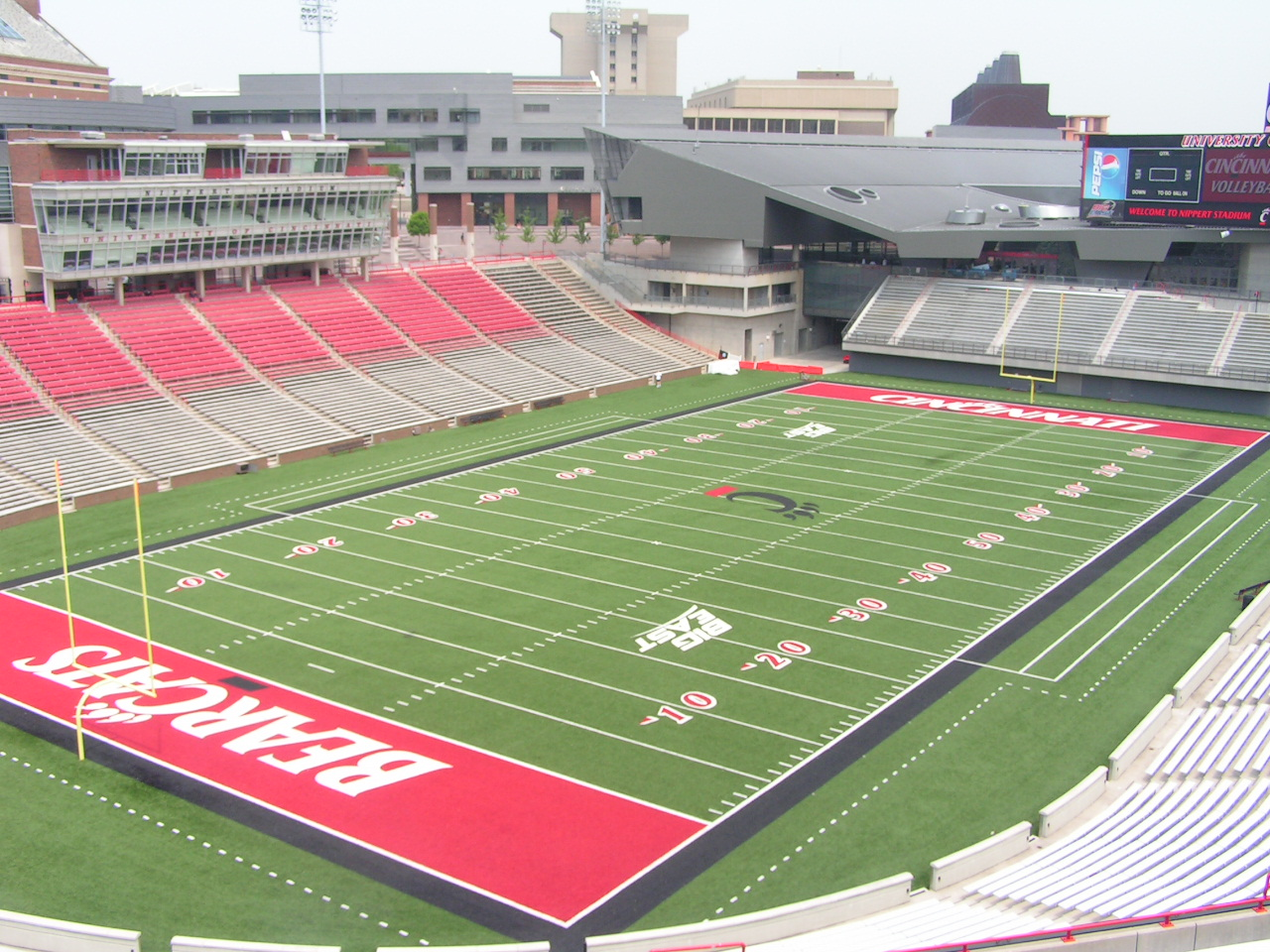
Nippert Stadium, located on the University of Cincinnati campus, served as the Bengals' first home stadium

For their first two seasons, they played at Nippert Stadium. The team finished its first season with a 3–11 record, although one bright spot was running back Paul Robinson. Robinson rushed for 1,023 yards and was named the AFL Rookie of the Year. In 1970, the Bengals joined the NFL and made their first playoff appearance, having finished with the best record in the newly formed AFC Central division, but lost to the Baltimore Colts. Founder Paul Brown coached the team for its first three seasons, accumulating 15 wins and 27 losses and one tie. One of Brown's college draft strategies was to draft players with above average intelligence. Punter/wide receiver Pat McInally attended Harvard, and linebacker Reggie Williams attended Dartmouth College and served on Cincinnati city council while on the Bengals’ roster. Because of this policy, many former players were highly articulate and went on to have successful careers in commentary and broadcasting as well as the arts. In addition, Brown had a knack for locating and recognizing pro football talent in unusual places.

== The 1970s: Growing pains ==
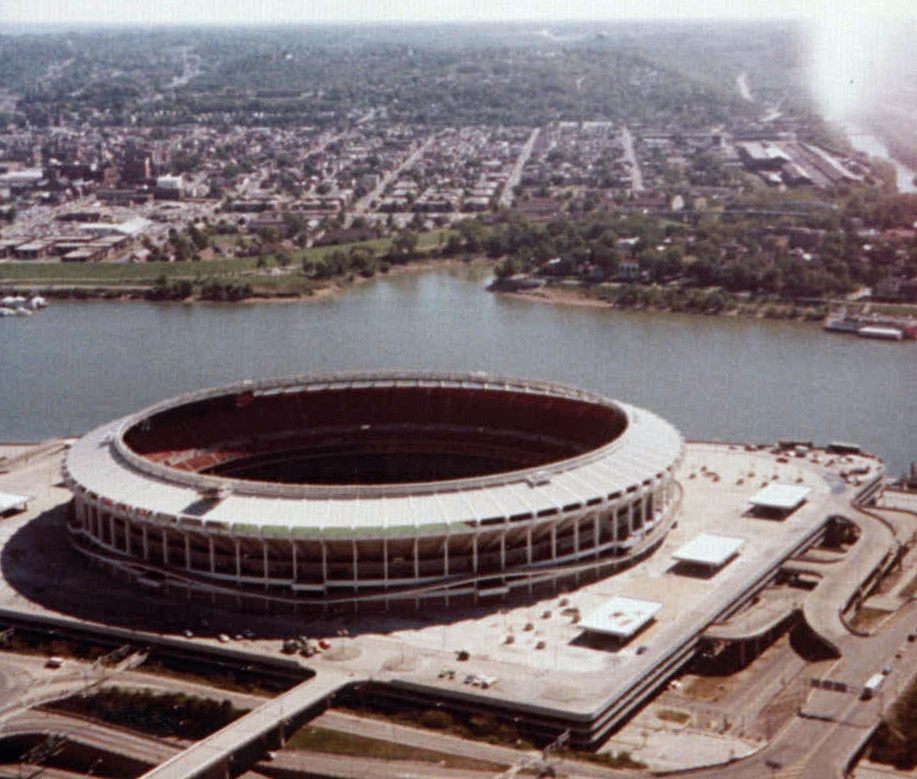
Riverfront Stadium, home of the Bengals from 1970 to 1999

In the summer of 1970, coinciding with the completion of the AFL-NFL merger, Riverfront Stadium (later known as Cinergy Field from 1996 to 2002), a home they shared with the Cincinnati Reds until the team moved to Paul Brown Stadium (now Paycor Stadium) in 2000, was opened. Brown, Bill "Tiger" Johnson, Homer Rice, and Forrest Gregg coached the Bengals during the '70s. The Bengals were placed in the AFC Central division with the completion of the merger, and were its first division champions in 1970.

=== Memorable players from the 1970s ===
- Greg Cook (1969–1974) – Record-setting rookie quarterback whose career was cut short by a devastating shoulder injury the following spring. He would return three years later for just one game. As a rookie, Cook set a single-season NFL record for average yards per completion (17 yards).
- Ken Anderson (1971–1986) – Ken Anderson's 16 seasons are the most by a Bengals player. The four-time Pro Bowler played 192 games in a career highlighted by leading the Bengals to their first Super Bowl while winning the NFL MVP and passing title in 1981. Anderson is one of five players in NFL history to win at least four league passing titles, and the only one to win consecutive passing titles in two different decades – 1974-75 and 1981–82. He's one of only five men to win at least four NFL passing titles.His third one in 1981 not only gave him the league MVP, but also NFL Comeback Player of the Year. After getting benched in the opener, Anderson showed the resourcefulness of his franchise-longest 16 seasons when he bounced back the next week to lead them to a 31–30 victory over the Jets at Shea Stadium. The press box phones conked out and Anderson had to decipher the hand signals before he helped carry the team to Super Bowl XVI. In 2021, Anderson was enshrined in the Bengals Ring of Honor, with the inaugural class.
- Paul Robinson (1968–1972) – two-time Pro Bowl running back, rookie of the year, 1968 (expansion year).
- Isaac Curtis (1973–1984) – four-time Pro Bowl wide receiver known for his speed and exceptional pass-catching ability. Isaac played twelve seasons and held the team record for receiving yards (7,101) until 2007. His 17.1 yards per catch average remains a franchise record.
- Jim LeClair (1972–1983) – linebacker who played 12 seasons for the Bengals and made the pro bowl in 1976. Also a member of the United States Army Reserve for six years.
- Bob Trumpy (1968–1977) – Outspoken three-time Pro Bowl tight end who now does radio and television commentary. Bob holds the team record for touchdown catches and average yards per catch by a tight end.
- Pete Johnson (1977–1983) – Large Pro Bowl fullback who holds the team record for career touchdowns (70).
- Dave Lapham (1974–1983) – A multi-position offensive lineman who now does commentary for the team's radio broadcasts.
- Pat McInally (1976–1985) – wide receiver and Pro Bowl punter. A Harvard graduate, McInally became the only player to attain a perfect score (50 points) on an NFL intelligence test. He was also the first Harvard graduate to ever play in a Pro Bowl and a Super Bowl.
- Bruce Coslet (1969–1976) – Played tight end for the Bengals. Returned as offensive coordinator under Sam Wyche, left the team for a head coaching position with the New York Jets, to return to Cincinnati as head coach from 1996 to 2000, winning 21 and losing 39.
- Mike Reid (1970–1974) – two-time Pro Bowl defensive end who retired early from football to pursue a career in piano and songwriting. Reid has written several Grammy-winning songs.
- Coy Bacon (1976–1977) – Coy was an expert pass rusher. He earned a Pro Bowl spot by setting the single season team record for quarterback sacks in 1976 with 22.
- Ken Riley (1969–1983) – Ken was one of the best cornerbacks of all time. He set the team single-season record for interceptions (9) and the career record (65). In his last season of play, Riley led the AFC with eight interceptions. At the time of his retirement, Ken Riley was number three in the NFL record book for all-time career interceptions with 65.
- Lemar Parrish (1970–1977) – An 8-time Pro Bowl player (six times with the Bengals) at cornerback, Lemar had 25 interceptions with the Bengals and 47 total in his career. In addition to being a great defensive back, he excelled at kick and punt returning on special teams. Parrish is the Bengals' all-time leader in touchdowns scored by "return or recovery" with 13 (4 on punt returns, 4 on interception returns, 3 on fumble returns, 1 on a kickoff return, and 1 on a blocked field goal return). He is the only player in franchise history ever to score 2 "return or recovery" touchdowns in a single game, a feat he accomplished 3 times.
- Tommy Casanova (1972–1977) – A three-time Pro Bowl free safety, Tommy collected 17 career interceptions.

=== 1970s games of note ===
- December 17, 1972 – The Bengals set a team scoring record as they massacred the Houston Oilers 61–17. In the game, Bengals' defensive back Lemar Parrish set a single-game team record by intercepting three passes, returning two of them for touchdowns.
- December 16, 1973 – Traveling to Houston, the Bengals defeat the Oilers 27–24 to clinch its second AFC Central division crown. Cincinnati won its final six games (the last two of which were on the road) to finish 10–4 in the '73 season, edging out the Pittsburgh Steelers for the division championship.
- December 22, 1973 – In their second playoff game, the Bengals were once again on the road and fell again to the eventual Super Bowl champions. In the Miami Orange Bowl, the Miami Dolphins defeated the Bengals 34–16.
- November 10, 1974 – Quarterback Ken Anderson completed 20 of 22 passes (a single game team completion percentage record) as Cincinnati defeats the Pittsburgh Steelers 17–10.
- December 21, 1975 – In the regular season's final game, the Bengals blew up the San Diego Chargers 47–17. Despite their 11–3 season record, the Bengals finished second in the AFC Central division to the defending and eventual Super Bowl champion Pittsburgh Steelers, who finished 12–2. The 11–3 record enabled the Bengals to capture the AFC Wild Card gave the team their highest winning percentage in franchise history. Ken Anderson won his second consecutive NFL passing title.
- December 28, 1975 – In the organization's third playoff game, the Bengals once again had to travel. Despite a 14–10 victory over the Oakland Raiders in week five of the regular season, the Raiders top the Bengals in Oakland, 31–28 in what would be Paul Brown's final game as Cincinnati head coach.
- December 12, 1976 – During the final game of the season in New York City's Shea Stadium, Bengals' defensive end Coy Bacon sacked New York Jets' quarterback Joe Namath four times in a 42–3 Bengals' rout. Coy got to the opposing passer 22 times in 1976, but the NFL did not record quarterback sack statistics until 1982. Defensive back Ken Riley also recorded a franchise record 3 interceptions in the game, 2 from Namath and 1 from Richard Todd.
- October 22, 1978 – In the lowest scoring game in Cincinnati Bengals' history, the Buffalo Bills defeated the Bengals 5–0.
- December 21, 1980 – Bengals defensive end Eddie Edwards set a single game team record by sacking Cleveland Browns' quarterback Brian Sipe five times. The Browns, needing a win to qualify for the playoffs, came out ahead 27–24.

== The 1980s: Reaching the Super Bowls ==
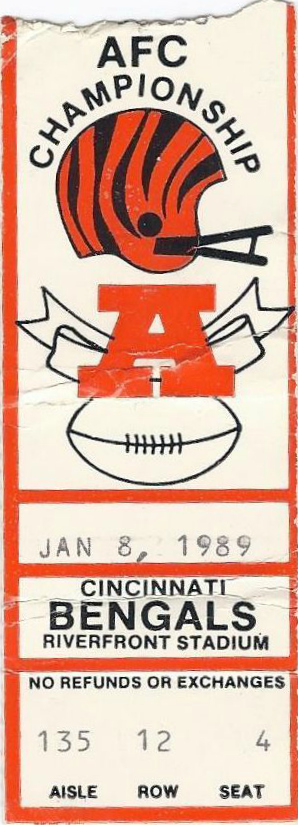
A ticket for the 1989 AFC Championship Game between the Bengals and the Bills.

The Bengals were a successful team during the 1980s, reaching the Super Bowl twice, but overall, it was a decade of missed opportunities for the team. The team was coached by Gregg and Sam Wyche during the decade.

Perhaps the most significant change occurred prior to the 1981 season, when the Bengals replaced their somewhat conservative uniform design of standard black jerseys at home and white jerseys on the road with some orange trim, along with their plain orange helmet logo that said "BENGALS" in black lettering, with a new, radical (for its time) look, which featured orange and black tiger stripes on the shoulders of their jerseys, down the sides of their pants, and, most prominently, on their helmets.

=== Memorable players from the 1980s ===
- Eddie Edwards (1977–1988) – Defensive end who holds the team single game record for quarterback sacks (5) and career record (83.5).
- Eddie Brown (1985–1991) – Superb deep threat Wide receiver who finished his career with 363 receptions for 6,134 yards (an impressive 16.9 yards per catch average) and 41 touchdowns. Brown was selected as the NFL's offensive rookie of the year in 1985. In 1988, he recorded 53 receptions for 1,273 yards and 9 touchdowns, helping the Bengals to Super Bowl XXIII and setting franchise single-season records for receiving yards and yards per catch. Chad Johnson surpassed Brown's receiving record with 1,355 yards in 2003, but it took him 37 more receptions than Brown (90) to do so. Brown also set a franchise record with 216 receiving yards in a single game in the 1988 season.
- Ross Browner (1978–1986) – Defensive end who collected 59 quarterback sacks. The father of former Pittsburgh Steelers offensive tackle Max Starks.
- Reggie Williams (1976–1989) – played effectively at outside linebacker and served on the Cincinnati city council. Williams intercepted 14 passes in his career.
- Louis Breeden (1978–1987) – Breeden is second on the list for all-time career interceptions with 33.
- Jim Breech (1980–1992) – Breech was the Bengals' placekicker for 13 seasons. He is the team's all-time leading scorer with 1,151 points, and was a perfect 9 for 9 in overtime field goals during his career, an NFL record. Breech was also automatic in both of the Bengals' Super Bowl appearances in the 1980s, not missing a field goal or extra point in either one.
- Tim Krumrie (1983–1994) – All-Pro nose tackle who led the team in tackles in five seasons. He returned as DL position coach until 2002. He suffered a gruesome broken leg in one of the most replayed moments of Super Bowl XXIII.
- David Fulcher (1986–1992) – hard-hitting, All-Pro linebacker-sized strong safety. The "vulture" had 31 career interceptions and made the Pro Bowl three times. He also led the team in tackles and caused a fumble in Super Bowl XXIII.
- Rodney Holman (1982–1992) – A three-time pro bowl (1988–1990) tight end, Holman's superb blocking and pass catching was a key reason for the Bengals' success in the 1980s and assisted them to Super Bowl XXIII. Career stats are 365 receptions for 4,771 yards and 36 touchdowns. As of 2005, Holman's 318 receptions with the Bengals ranks him as their 6th all-time leading receiver.
- Dan Ross (1979–1985) – Pro Bowl tight end who assisted the Bengals to Super Bowl XVI. Ross recorded a Super Bowl record 11 receptions for 104 yards and 2 touchdowns in the game, which would have likely earned him the Super Bowl MVP award if his team had won. Career stats are 290 receptions for 3,419 receiving yards and 19 touchdowns.
- Eric Thomas (1987–1992) – Pro Bowl cornerback. Thomas was a vital part of the defense on the Bengals' 1988 Super Bowl team. In his career, Thomas collected 15 interceptions.
- Anthony Muñoz (1980–1992) – Considered by many peers and fans alike to be one of the finest offensive tackles ever and even as far as the greatest player to ever grace the face of the NFL, Anthony Muñoz was a perennial Pro Bowl selection, a three-time Offensive Lineman of the Year (1981, 1987, and 1988), and was named to the Pro Bowl squad 11 consecutive times. In 1994, Muñoz, a USC alumni, was named to the National Football League's 75th anniversary all-time team. In 1998, Anthony Muñoz was enshrined in the Pro Football Hall of Fame, becoming the first Hall of Fame player ever to play his entire career for the Bengals.
- Cris Collinsworth (1981–88) – Tall, lanky, affable wide receiver and three-time Pro Bowler. His initial foray into broadcasting was substituting for former Bengals tight end Bob Trumpy on Trumpy's WLW radio show. He has done commentary for HBO, NBC, and Fox Sports.
- James Brooks (1984–1991) – In his eight years as a Bengal running back, Brooks rushed for 6,447 yards averaging 4.8 yards per carry. Brooks earned spots on four Pro Bowls. He left the Bengals as the team's all-time leading rusher, a record now held by Corey Dillon with 8,061 yards.
- Boomer Esiason (1984–1992, 1997) – Bengals' quarterback who became renowned early on in his career for his ability to execute the play action pass. His 14-year NFL career ended after completing 57% of his passes for 247 touchdowns and 37,920 passing yards. He holds the Bengals single game records for passing yards (490) and touchdown passes (5). Esiason led the Bengals to two AFC Central division titles (1988, 1990) and one AFC Championship, 1988. The season before his last, as quarterback for the Arizona Cardinals, Boomer threw for over 1,500 yards in just a three-week span, leading the Cardinals to victories over the Washington Redskins, Philadelphia Eagles, and New York Giants. He was the NFL MVP in 1988. Boomer currently does national broadcasting for the NFL on CBS. He also heads fund-raising for cystic-fibrosis charities.
- Tim McGee (1986–1992, 1994) – McGee recorded 282 receptions for 4,703 yards in his 8 seasons with the Bengals, a 16.7 yards per catch average, the third highest in franchise history. He also led the NFL in kickoff return yards in his rookie season.
- Ickey Woods (1988–1991) – Fullback who balanced well with his halfback counterpart, James Brooks, to provide balance in the highly potent offense during the Super Bowl season of 1988. Ickey was famous for his "Ickey Shuffle" dance after he would score a touchdown. He rushed for 1,066 yards, caught 21 passes for 199 yards, and scored an NFL rookie record 15 touchdowns in his first season, but two knee surgeries cut his promising career short.

=== 1980s games of note ===
- December 20, 1981 – The Bengals defeated the Atlanta Falcons 30–28 in the final regular season game. With their 12–4 record, the Bengals won the AFC Central division title. Quarterback Ken Anderson won his third NFL passing title.
- January 3, 1982 – Cincinnati hosted its first NFL playoff game as the Bengals defeated the Buffalo Bills 28–21 in Riverfront Stadium. It was the first postseason win in franchise history.
- January 10, 1982 – "The Freezer Bowl", The Bengals defeated the San Diego Chargers in the AFC Championship Game, 27–7, the coldest game ever played in NFL history. The wind chill factor brought the game-time temperature down to −56 °F (−49 °C). The Bengals' offensive linemen were on the field with their standard sleeveless jerseys in an effort to intimidate a Charger team more accustomed to the warmer California weather. The game has entered NFL lore as the Freezer Bowl.

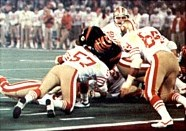
The Bengals playing against the 49ers in Super Bowl XVI.

- Super Bowl XVI, January 24, 1982 – Cincinnati appeared in Super Bowl XVI facing the San Francisco 49ers. Played in Detroit's Silverdome, it was the first Super Bowl north of the Mason–Dixon line. It was also the first Super Bowl since Super Bowl III to feature two teams who had never appeared in a Super Bowl before. (Super Bowl XX is the only game since with this feature.) The Bengals hurt themselves early and often in the game. After recovering a fumble from the 49ers on the opening kickoff, the Bengals gave the ball right back to San Francisco by throwing an interception, which led to a 49ers touchdown on their next possession. Later, a fumble cost the Bengals a sure score and another gave the 49ers a field goal. By halftime, the 49ers had built a 20–0 lead, the largest halftime margin in Super Bowl history, at the time. The Bengals made a valiant comeback attempt in the second half, and managed to outscore San Francisco by 15 points, but committed even more costly turnovers; another interception and a turnover on downs when the 49ers stuffed an attempted fourth down conversion attempt on the San Francisco one-yard line. Cincinnati ended up losing the game 26–21 despite outgaining the 49ers in total yards 356 to 274 and setting 3 Super Bowl records: most receptions by one player (11 by Dan Ross), most completions (25 by Ken Anderson), and highest completion percentage (73.5).
- December 20, 1982 – On a Monday Night Football stage, Bengals' quarterback Ken Anderson set a single-game team record by completing 40 passes in a 50–34 shootout loss to the San Diego Chargers.
- November 28, 1982 – Defensive back Ken Riley tied his own franchise record by intercepting 3 passes from Los Angeles Raiders quarterback Jim Plunkett, leading the Bengals to a 31–17 win.
- January 2, 1983 – In the regular season's final game, the Bengals beat the Houston Oilers 35–27. Cincinnati once again won the AFC Central division crown. Ken Anderson set an NFL record by completing 20 consecutive passes in the game and finished the season winning his second consecutive passing title. It was the second time in his career he had won the title in back-to-back seasons. Anderson finished the season completing 70.55% of his passes, an NFL single season record.
- January 9, 1983 – The New York Jets traveled to Cincinnati and beat the Bengals 44–17 in the first round of the NFL playoffs.
- October 28, 1984 – Bengals' bruising fullback Larry Kinnebrew scored four touchdowns setting a team single game scoring record as the Bengals drilled the Houston Oilers 31–13.
- December 21, 1986 – In the final game of the 1986 season, Bengals' quarterback Boomer Esiason set a team record by throwing five touchdown passes as Cincinnati shot down the New York Jets 52–21. It was also the last game for Bengals' quarterback Ken Anderson.
- October 16, 1988 – After leading Cincinnati to six straight wins to begin the season, Boomer Esiason set a single game team record throwing 5 interceptions in a 27–21 loss to the New England Patriots.
- November 6, 1988 – Bengals' wide receiver Eddie Brown set a single-game team record with 216 receiving yards as the Bengals defeated the Pittsburgh Steelers 42–7 in Cincinnati's Riverfront Stadium.
- December 17, 1988 – In the regular season finale, Bengal place kicker Jim Breech kicked a short field goal in overtime to edge the Washington Redskins 20–17. The win brought the team to 12–4 and locked up the organization's fifth AFC Central division title. Quarterback Boomer Esiason finished the season as the NFL's top rated passer.
- December 31, 1988 – Cincinnati hosted its fourth NFL playoff game. A sellout crowd at Riverfront Stadium watched the Bengals beat the Seattle Seahawks 21–13.
- January 8, 1989 – The Cincinnati Bengals shut down the Buffalo Bills 21–10 to win the organization's second AFC Championship
- Super Bowl XXIII, January 22, 1989 – The Bengals earned a rematch with the 49ers in Super Bowl XXIII, but lost 20–16 in Miami's Joe Robbie Stadium. The Bengals boasted the highest-scoring offense in 1988, and rebounded from a 4–12 record in 1987. But a few unfortunate events prevented the team from capturing the world championship. The night before the game, Bengals fullback Stanley Wilson suffered a "cocaine relapse", and did not participate in the game. Head coach Sam Wyche was forced to alter the game plan only hours before the opening kickoff. Bengals All-Pro nose tackle Tim Krumrie broke his leg in three places while tackling Roger Craig early in the first quarter. At the start of the fourth quarter, Bengals cornerback Lewis Billups dropped a sure interception in the end zone which would have sealed a Cincinnati win. The 49ers Jerry Rice scored on the next play. Despite all the adversity, the game remained close and the Bengals led the 49ers in the waning minutes of the game until the memorable drive late in the game, capped by a touchdown pass from Joe Montana to John Taylor with only 34 seconds left in the contest, which erased a Bengal lead and put the 49ers ahead for good.
- October 29, 1989 – Boomer Esiason tied his own record for touchdown passes in a game as the Bengals beat the Tampa Bay Buccaneers 56–23. The Bengals tied a team record with eight touchdowns in the game.

== The 1990s: The Bengals become the "Bungles" ==
Paul Brown, legendary NFL personality and innovator, died in 1991. He had already transferred control to his son, Mike Brown, but was reported to still influence the daily operations of the team. Shortly after his death, the Bengals' fortunes changed for the worse for a long time. During the decade, the team was nicknamed the "Bungles" by detractors, as the team began a lengthy playoff drought that lasted until 2005. Wyche, David Shula, Bruce Coslet, and Dick LeBeau coached the Bengals in the '90s.

=== Memorable players from the 1990s ===
- Lee Johnson (1988–1998) – Was the Bengals punter for 11 seasons. Set a Super Bowl record for longest punt with a 63-yard punt in Super Bowl XXIII. Overall, Johnson played 18 seasons in the NFL and recorded a career total of 51,979 punting yards, the third most in NFL history when he was cut from the team. During the dismal decade Johnson made a bitter comment about team management (referring to individuals higher than the coaches) and was suspended, fined and then cut from the team before the Pickens incident. Johnson was one of the more recognizable and veteran players.
- Carl Pickens (1992–99) and Darnay Scott (1994–2001), both wide receivers along with quarterback Jeff Blake (1994–99). The trio rekindled the Bengals' identity as a high-powered offense. Pickens was a fast and elusive receiver; he was well disciplined in running routes displaying excellent hands. Scott complimented him with his own amazing speed. Pickens was the more favored target of Blake and when Pickens left, Scott was unable to fill the vacancy. Pickens, with other teams, was nowhere near as successful without Blake as his quarterback. The three worked excellently together and when one wasn't there the chemistry was gone for them as a team or individual.

- Pickens made the Pro Bowl twice with the Bengals and held the team record for most receptions in the regular season until 2007. He left the team due to personality conflicts (which led to some fines as well as a new player contract clause for later players nicknamed the "Pickens Clause" which penalizes players for disparaging remarks about the club or management).
- Scott recorded over 800 receiving yards in all of his 7 seasons with the Bengals, with the sole exception of 1997, when he recorded 797 yards.
- Blake was the only other quarterback, other than Esiason in 1997, to lead the team to a non-losing record (8-8) during the string of bad seasons. He was famous for his short stature and his "moon ball" (nicknamed such for its high arc) which was a very successful play to Carl Pickens and Darnay Scott. He was drafted by the Jets under their head coach of the time, Coslet, and came over as a backup to David Klingler when Coslet arrived. He got the start due to injuries and was never challenged for the quarterback position by Klingler again. He was benched after the drafting of Akili Smith. Blake remained in the league as a starter and backup beyond 2005 whereas neither of his favorite receivers remained in the league for another 2 years after they left the Bengals.

- Corey Dillon (1997–2003) – Controversial but highly talented running back. He broke many league rookie records (which were subsequently broken in the next year) and Bengal franchise records (which were broken by his replacement Rudi Johnson). He left the Bengals prior to the 2004 campaign and won Super Bowl XXXIX with the New England Patriots. Left the Bengals with insulting statements which many Bengals' fans reacted to with anger. He holds Bengals records for most career rushing yards (8,061) and rushing yards in one game (278).
- Takeo Spikes (1998–2002) – Fast, strong (tackled hulking and lumbering RB Jerome Bettis with one hand by the neck collar from behind), emotional and talented inside linebacker. Coupled with Brian Simmons, he was a powerful force and emotional leader for the maligned defense. He left Cincinnati for the Buffalo Bills after the 2-14 2002 season under Dick LeBeau, believing Cincinnati would not turn itself around under rookie head coach Marvin Lewis. The Bengals went 27–21 over the next three seasons, including an 11-5 AFC North Division Championship season in 2005. The Bills went 20–28 over the same period with no postseason appearances.
- Ki-Jana Carter, Dan Wilkinson, Akili Smith, and David Klingler, were four players drafted during this period touted as "franchise-saving" individuals. Whether it was a lack of talent, poor coaching, bad luck with injuries, each one of these drafts proved to be an astoundingly horrible selection. Dan Wilkinson, the first pick of the 1994 draft, is the only one who remained in the league with other teams but never had the "breakout season" to justify his 1st-round draft status, high paying initial contract, or being the number one overall draft pick.

=== 1990s games of note ===
- October 7, 1990 – Bengals' quarterback Boomer Esiason threw for 490 yards (a single game team passing record) in a 34–31 victory over the Los Angeles Rams.
- December 30, 1990 – The Bengals won the Battle of Ohio, beating the Cleveland Browns 21–14. The victory made the team once again AFC Central division champs.
- January 6, 1991 – In the organization's sixth home playoff game, Sam Wyche and the Bengals again drilled the Houston Oilers 41–14.
- January 13, 1991 – A week after the victory over the Oilers, the Los Angeles Raiders knocked the Bengals out of the playoffs by a 20–10 score. During the game, All-Pro running back Bo Jackson suffered a career ending hip injury on a routine tackle by linebacker Kevin Walker.
- December 17, 1995 – The Bengals lose to intrastate rival Cleveland Browns 26–10, in the last NFL game ever played at Cleveland Municipal Stadium. It would also be the last game played in the "Battle of Ohio" series for the next four years, as the Browns relocated to Baltimore following the '95 season and became the Baltimore Ravens
- December 4, 1997 – Running back Corey Dillon rushed for 246 yards on 39 carries, breaking the NFL rookie record of 237 yards set by Jim Brown in 1957. This mark would later be eclipsed by Mike Anderson of the Denver Broncos.
- December 21, 1997 – Bengals' quarterback Boomer Esiason played his last NFL game. His last play was a 79-yard touchdown play-action pass to wide receiver Darnay Scott. Cincinnati won the game 16–14 against the Baltimore Ravens. Boomer finished the season with a 107 quarterback rating.
- October 10, 1999 – The Browns return to the NFL and host their intrastate rivals, with the Bengals winning 18–17.

== 2000s: Return to relevance ==
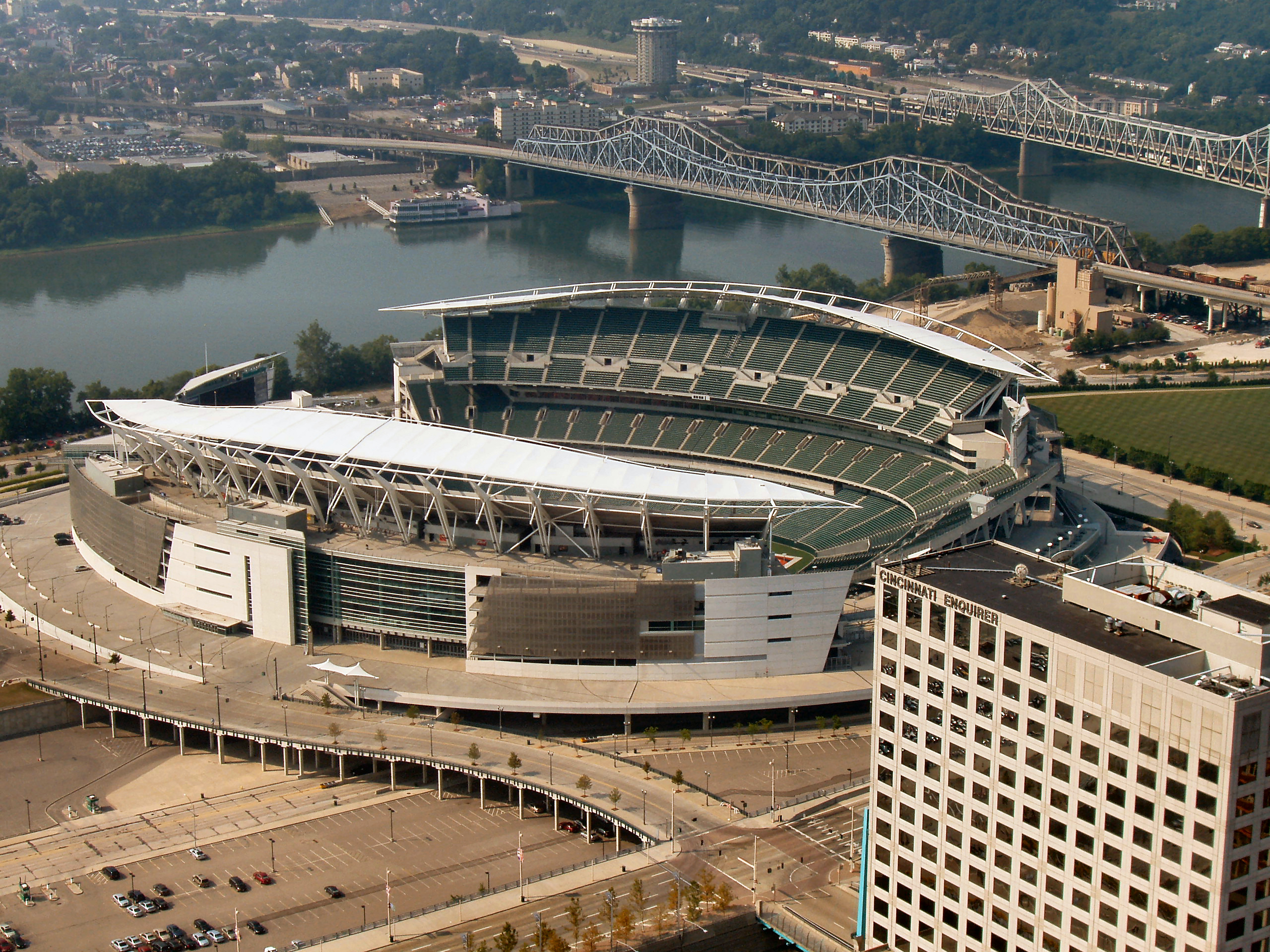
Paul Brown Stadium, current home of the Bengals, opened in 2000.

=== Intensification of rivalry with Pittsburgh Steelers ===
The Bengals have played the Steelers more than any other team in the NFL (the Browns missed keeping pace by being out of the league for three years, the Oilers/Titans team was moved from the division, and the Baltimore Ravens are considered a "new" franchise as Cleveland retained its rights to the name and history). LeBeau and Marvin Lewis coached the Bengals in the 2000s.

=== Memorable players from the 2000s ===
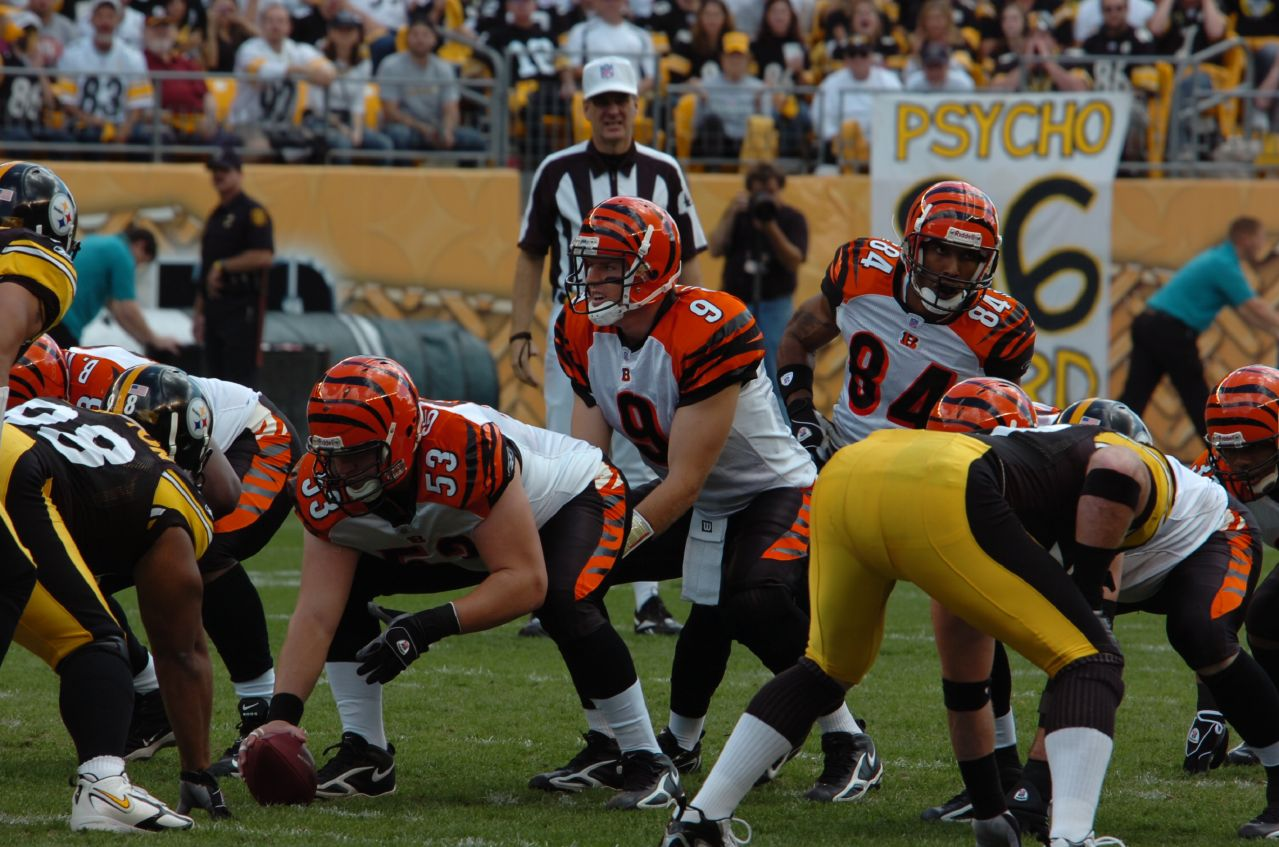
Quarterback Carson Palmer, wide receiver #84 T. J. Houshmandzadeh, and the rest of the Bengals line up to play the Pittsburgh Steelers in 2006.

- Carson Palmer, 2002 Heisman Trophy Award winner. First Bengals QB to have a 100+ passer rating for the season, and broke several team passing records in his 2nd year as a starter (attempts, completions, and touchdowns). He also tied the NFL record for consecutive games with a 100+ rating during the same season. He holds the Bengals' Single Season Passing Yards with 4035 yards [2006], as well as the record for touchdown passes in a season (32) and single game (6).
- The Johnsons, wide receiver: Chad Johnson, tailback: Rudi Johnson, and fullback: Jeremi Johnson formed an offensive trio that propelled the Bengals' offense into its high-standing.

- Chad Johnson broke the team record for reception yards in consecutive years ('04 & '05 season, 1,400+ yards), also first Bengal ever to lead the NFL in receiving yards in 2006. In 2007, he became the team's all-time leader in receptions and receiving yards.
- Rudi Johnson broke the team record for rushing yards in consecutive years ('04 & '05 season)
- Jeremi Johnson, while used primarily as a blocking fullback, is a very capable receiver and elusive in the open field.

- Willie Anderson and Levi Jones are the left and right tackles. Willie Anderson has started a franchise record number of consecutive games.
- Deltha O'Neal and Tory James alternated leading the Bengals in interceptions, where one or both gained yearly recognition by making it into the Pro Bowl. In 2005, O'Neal set a franchise record with 10 interceptions.
- Shayne Graham signed by the Bengals after being cut from 2 other teams, Graham set a Bengals record by making 88% (22 of 25) of his field goals in his first season with them. He made the Pro Bowl in 2005.
- T. J. Houshmandzadeh was a collegiate teammate of Chad Johnson's at Oregon State and, like Johnson, had a troubled history. Originally a third and fourth receiver, Houshmandzadeh overcame hamstring problems that plagued him in his second year, shed some weight to improve his performance and was promoted to the starting lineup in 2004 with the release of Peter Warrick. While not quite as fast as Johnson, Houshmandzadeh has proven himself a dependable possession receiver who's willing to make the tough short and medium range catches in traffic where he is prone to taking hard hits. In 2007, he set the team record for receptions in a season.
- Peter Warrick was another Bengals first-round pick that didn't pan out.
- Linebacker Odell Thurman and wide receiver Chris Henry. Both were high draft picks in 2005 and they made immediate positive impacts on the field for the Bengals. Odell was a candidate for NFL Defensive Rookie of the Year. Chris Henry provided a second deep threat alongside Chad Johnson and bolstered the offense tremendously. Both, however, had off-field issues involving league substance violations and legal troubles. During their short careers, they had a limited amount of playing time before being released between the 2007–2008 seasons. Their non-football related troubles are often considered to be the most visible incidents giving the Bengals a stigma of being in trouble with the law and the league.

=== 2000s games of note ===
- September 24, 2000 – The Baltimore Ravens mauled the Bengals 37–0 in the most lopsided loss in franchise history.
- October 22, 2000 – In a 31–21 victory against the Denver Broncos, Bengals Pro Bowl running back Corey Dillon captured the single-game rushing record. Dillon ran for 278 yards breaking the previous mark set by the Chicago Bears' Walter Payton. Jamal Lewis of the Baltimore Ravens broke Dillon's record in 2003.
- December 8, 2002 – The Carolina Panthers dropped 52 points on the Bengals, the most ever relinquished by any Bengal team. The final score was 52––31.
- September 24, 2005 – After forcing five interceptions the previous week against the Vikings, the Bengals intercepted five more this game against the Bears. In doing so, the team accomplished a feat that had not been done in 34 years. The last team to have back-to-back games with 5 or more interceptions was the 1971 Browns. Later in the season, they faced the Green Bay Packers, another NFC North team, and also intercepted 5 passes on their way to victory.
- December 18, 2005 – The Bengals clinch the AFC North title and their first playoff appearance in 15 years with a 41–17 rout of the Detroit Lions. Carson Palmer (QB) sets a franchise record with 32 touchdown passes in a single season and Deltha O'Neal (CB) set a franchise record for most interceptions in a season with 10.

AFC Wild-Card Round

- January 8, 2006 – The Bengals hosted their first ever playoff game at Paul Brown Stadium, against the Pittsburgh Steelers. Star quarterback Carson Palmer was injured on Cincinnati's second play from scrimmage, his first postseason pass attempt, (which was completed to rookie wide receiver Chris Henry for a Bengals postseason record play of 66 yards; Henry was also injured on that very play) with a torn ACL, and the team failed to rally around Jon Kitna. Multiple injuries and many fights marred the game. The Steelers defeated the Bengals in the wild-card playoff game, 31–17.

=== 2000–2005 ===
The Bengals began to emerge from more than a decade of being the worst-performing team of that era (edging out the Cardinals) into a new era of increased consistency under Marvin Lewis, after the team finished with its worst record in history in 2002 with a 2–14 record. Carson Palmer, the future star quarterback, was drafted in 2003 but did not play a snap that whole season, as Jon Kitna had a comeback year (voted NFL Comeback Player of the Year). Despite Kitna's success, Carson was promoted to starting quarterback the following season and Kitna, apparently happily, took the position of backup quarterback and embraced the role of mentor for the young quarterback.

Paul Brown Stadium was built for the 2000 season using private and public money. In tribute to his father, Mike Brown refused corporate offers to have the stadium renamed for their company which became a trend in the NFL and other sports team around that time.

During the 2005 season, the Bengals became known for their players' off-field and non-football related violations of league substance policies and legal troubles.

=== 2006–2008 ===
After making the playoffs for the first time since 1990, the Bengals regressed to 8–8 in 2006. They continued to slide the next two years, finishing with a 7–9 record in 2007 and 4–11–1 in 2008. In all three years, numerous Bengals players aside from Henry and Thurman were involved with legal issues. In 2008, Carson Palmer suffered a season-ending injury, leading to backup Ryan Fitzpatrick playing for most of the season.

=== 2009 ===
The season opener against Denver was a 12–7 defeat, but afterward the Bengals won four in a row against the Packers, Steelers, Browns, and Ravens. The team lost at home to the Texans, then beat the Bears, Ravens, and Steelers. In Week 11 however, Cincinnati fell into a trap game when it lost to the 3–7 Raiders. After another defeat of Cleveland, the Bengals had won all six of their divisional matches for the year. Following the next game (an easy win at home over Detroit), Chad Ochocinco was fined $20,000 by the NFL for donning a poncho and sombrero after scoring a touchdown (he had been fined three weeks earlier for joking about bribing the referees). Week 14 saw the Bengals travel to Minnesota, where the Vikings routed them 30–10. During the week after that game, tragedy struck when Chris Henry fell out of a pickup truck during a domestic dispute and died from his injuries. The team's previously lighthearted mood turned to one of mourning, and they lost the next match against San Diego. After a victory over the Chiefs, the Bengals secured the AFC North title for only their second playoff berth since 1990. They traveled to the Meadowlands for a match with the New York Jets, but still shaken from Chris Henry's death, they were shut out 37–0. The Bengals and Jets had to face each other again in the wild-card round of the playoffs, but now in Cincinnati. Their season, which looked so promising a few weeks earlier, ended with a whimper as the Jets won a second time, the score being 24–14.

== 2010s: The Andy Dalton era ==
Lewis and Zac Taylor have coached the Bengals in the 2010s.

=== Memorable players from the 2010s ===
- Andy Dalton, quarterback. Dalton has set numerous quarterback records for the Bengals since he was thrust into the starting role as a rookie and has passed for at least 3,000 yards in each of his first seven seasons.
- A. J. Green, wide receiver. Selected 4th overall in the 2011 NFL draft, Green made the Pro Bowl in each of his first seven seasons and was named an All-Pro twice.
- Vontaze Burfict, linebacker. An undrafted player, Burfict became one of the NFL's most dominant and feared defensive players but has also been accused of dirty play.
- Giovani Bernard and Jeremy Hill formed a respectable running back tandem for several seasons between 2013 and 2017, but both were supplanted by Joe Mixon in later years.
- Adam "Pacman" Jones, cornerback and return specialist. Despite controversy amid his signing stemming from past off-field issues, Jones became a stalwart on the Bengals defense for numerous years.
- Russell Bodine, center. Bodine started every game in his Bengals career before signing with the Buffalo Bills.
- Kevin Huber, punter. A Cincinnati native who attended both high school and college in the city, Huber was recognized as an All-Pro in 2014.

=== 2010 ===
During the offseason, the Bengals signed wide receiver Terrell Owens to a one-year deal, giving the team two dominant but aging receivers with Owens and Chad Ochocinco. Nonetheless, the team collapsed after a 2–1 start, losing 10 games in a row on the way to finishing with a 4–12 record, the worst finish for Marvin Lewis as head coach.

=== 2011 ===
With the 4th pick in the 2011 draft, the Bengals took WR A. J. Green from Georgia. Most of the off-season was marred by a league lockout and Carson Palmer's sudden demand to be traded to another team. Mike Brown flatly refused to either release or trade him, and Palmer instead announced his plans to retire from the NFL. Another familiar face departed when Chad Ochocinco was traded to New England in August. With this, the Bengals decided to name unproven rookie QB Andy Dalton as their starter. On October 17, Palmer, who had been holding out since Brown announced he refused to trade him, was traded to the Oakland Raiders for 2 first-round picks in 2012 and 2013. The Bengals finished with a record of 9-7 and qualified for the playoffs as the 6th seed in the AFC. They lost 31–10 to the Houston Texans in the wild-card round.

=== 2012 ===
This was the first non-strike year that the Bengals qualified for the playoffs in back-to-back seasons. The Bengals finished 10–6, improving on their record from the previous year and securing the #5 seed in the AFC, but lost again to the Houston Texans.

=== 2013 ===
The Bengals came into the 2013 season as division favorites and as a dark horse for the Super Bowl. The Bengals attained an 11–5 record, winning the AFC North division title. However, their season came to an end in the wild-card round when the San Diego Chargers beat the heavily favored Bengals.

=== 2014 ===
Head coach Marvin Lewis was given authority over many day-to-day football operations by owner Mike Brown prior to the season. The Bengals finished 10–5–1 and once again made the playoffs, but were knocked out by the Indianapolis Colts.

=== 2015: Fifth straight playoff appearance ===
The 2015 season saw the Bengals attain an 8–0 start, thanks to strong play from Andy Dalton. However, Dalton broke his thumb in week 14 against the Pittsburgh Steelers. Backup A. J. McCarron was serviceable, leading the team to finish at 12–4 and clinched the AFC North title for the second time in three seasons. The Bengals were set to win their first playoff game since the 1980s against the Steelers in the wild-card round, but linebacker Vontaze Burfict inflicted a helmet-to-helmet hit on Steelers wide receiver Antonio Brown in the waning seconds of the game, drawing a personal foul penalty. An additional personal foul by cornerback Adam "Pacman" Jones set the Steelers up in Bengals territory and allowed them to kick the game-winning field goal. With the 18–16 loss, the Bengals lost in the wild-card round for the fifth straight season and were knocked out of the playoffs once again.

=== 2016–2017 ===
For the first time in Andy Dalton's career, the Bengals missed the playoffs in 2016 when they finished with a disappointing 6–9–1 record. The following season, the Bengals finished with another losing record and missed the playoffs again, the first time in Marvin Lewis' tenure as head coach that the team finished with consecutive losing seasons. Lewis and the Bengals agreed on a two-year contract extension following the season after much speculation otherwise.

=== 2018: Final year of the Marvin Lewis era ===
The Bengals started with a 4–1 record, but stumbled the rest of the season to a 6–10 record, once again missing the postseason. Andy Dalton suffered another season-ending injury, forcing the team to play Jeff Driskel in his stead. Following the season, the Bengals and Marvin Lewis mutually decided to part ways following three consecutive non-playoff years and an 0–7 record in the postseason.

=== 2019: Zac Taylor takes over ===
To replace Marvin Lewis, Cincinnati hired Zac Taylor, who had previously served as the quarterbacks coach for the Los Angeles Rams. The Bengals started the season off poorly at 0–9. Andy Dalton started the first eight games at quarterback before being benched for rookie Ryan Finley. After falling to 0–11 for the first time in franchise history, Dalton was made the starter again. The Bengals got their first win of the season in week 13 with a 22–6 victory against the New York Jets. After a 38–35 overtime loss to the Miami Dolphins in week 16, the Bengals finished the season 2–14 (equaling the 2002 season as the team's worst in history) and clinched the first overall pick in the 2020 NFL draft.

== 2020s: The Joe Burrow era ==
=== 2020 ===
The 2020 season marked the first time since 2010 that Andy Dalton wasn't on the roster, as he was released by the Bengals a week after the draft, when the Bengals used their first overall pick on LSU quarterback Joe Burrow. The Bengals started off with a close 16–13 loss to the Los Angeles Chargers, followed by a 35–30 loss to the Cleveland Browns. In week 3, the Bengals met the Philadelphia Eagles, and kept it close for the entire game; in overtime, however, both teams failed to score, as the game ended in a 23–23 tie. The Bengals recorded their first victory, a 33–25 contest over the Jacksonville Jaguars in week 4. The Bengals would get blown out by the Baltimore Ravens 27–3 in week 5, followed by a 31–27 loss to the Indianapolis Colts in which the Bengals blew a 21–0 first-quarter lead. Week 7 against the Browns was a high-scoring match. Despite scoring in the final minutes to take a 34–31 lead, the Bengals would falter, allowing a game-winning drive by the Browns, and lost 37–34. The Bengals then stunned the 5–1 Tennessee Titans 31–20 in week 8 to acquire their second victory. After their bye week, they got blown out by the Pittsburgh Steelers, who improved to 9–0 after the victory, by a score of 36–10. Week 11 against the Washington Football Team was close in the first half. However, Joe Burrow suffered a season-ending knee injury in the third quarter, allowing Washington to get away with a 20–9 victory. The Bengals wouldn't recover for three weeks, losing to the New York Giants, Miami Dolphins (which eliminated them from playoff contention), and Dallas Cowboys by scores of 19–17, 19–7, and 30–7, respectively. The Bengals then experienced a moment of success in week 15, when they upset the 14.5-point favored Steelers 27–17 to not only win their third game of the season, but to hand the Steelers their third consecutive loss after starting 11–0. After a 37–31 win over the Houston Texans and a 38–3 beatdown loss by the Ravens, the Bengals finished at 4–11–1, last in the division, and secured the fifth overall pick in 2021.

=== 2021 ===
The Cincinnati Bengals finished the regular season with a 10–7 record, clinching the AFC North with a 34–31 victory over the Kansas City Chiefs in Week 17. The Bengals defeated the Las Vegas Raiders in the wild-card round 26–19, clinching their first playoff victory since 1990, before proceeding to squeak past the top-seeded Tennessee Titans, 19–16, in the divisional round. A week later in the AFC Championship, in a rematch against the number 2-seeded Kansas City Chiefs, the Bengals came back from a 21–3 second quarter deficit to win 27–24 in overtime, sending the Bengals to their first Super Bowl appearance in 33 years. Kansas City won the coin toss and had possession to begin the overtime period, but Cincinnati's Vonn Bell intercepted a Patrick Mahomes throw to set up a drive to the Chiefs' 13-yard line. Evan McPherson then kicked the game-winning field goal, his fourth of the game. In Super Bowl LVI, the Bengals faced the Los Angeles Rams and lost 23–20. Joe Burrow would be named the 2021 Comeback Player of the Year after the year concluded.

=== 2022 ===
After an 0–2 start, the Bengals quickly turned around, winning 12 out of their last 14 games to match their franchise best record of 12–4. The Bengals improved upon their 10–7 record from the previous season and clinched the AFC North title for the second straight year. Cincinnati's Week 17 game against Buffalo was declared a no-contest after Buffalo safety Damar Hamlin suffered cardiac arrest, resulting in only 16 games played.

The Bengals defeated Baltimore 24–17 in the Wild Card round. The most notable play was a fumble recovery and 98-yard touchdown return by defensive end Sam Hubbard after linebacker Logan Wilson stripped the ball from Ravens quarterback Tyler Huntley on a quarterback sneak. The following week, the Bengals traveled to face Buffalo. Despite Buffalo's home-field advantage and snowy conditions, the Bengals prevailed 27–10. With the win, they advanced to the AFC Championship Game for the second consecutive year, a first in franchise history. The Bengals faced Kansas City in Arrowhead Stadium for a rematch of the previous year's contest and found themselves tied late into the fourth quarter. However, a personal foul penalty by the Bengals would aid a late Kansas City field goal attempt and the Bengals ultimately lost 23–20 to the eventual Super Bowl LVII champions.

=== 2023 ===
The Bengals finished with a record of 9–8, last in the AFC North division, and missed the playoffs for the first time since 2020.

=== 2024 ===
The Bengals finished with a record of 9–8, third in the AFC North division, but missed the playoffs after the Denver Broncos shutout the Kansas City Chiefs.

=== 2025 ===
The Bengals finished with a record of 6–11, third in the AFC North division, but missed the playoffs.

== See also ==
- Cincinnati Bengals draft history
