= List of Cincinnati Bengals head coaches =

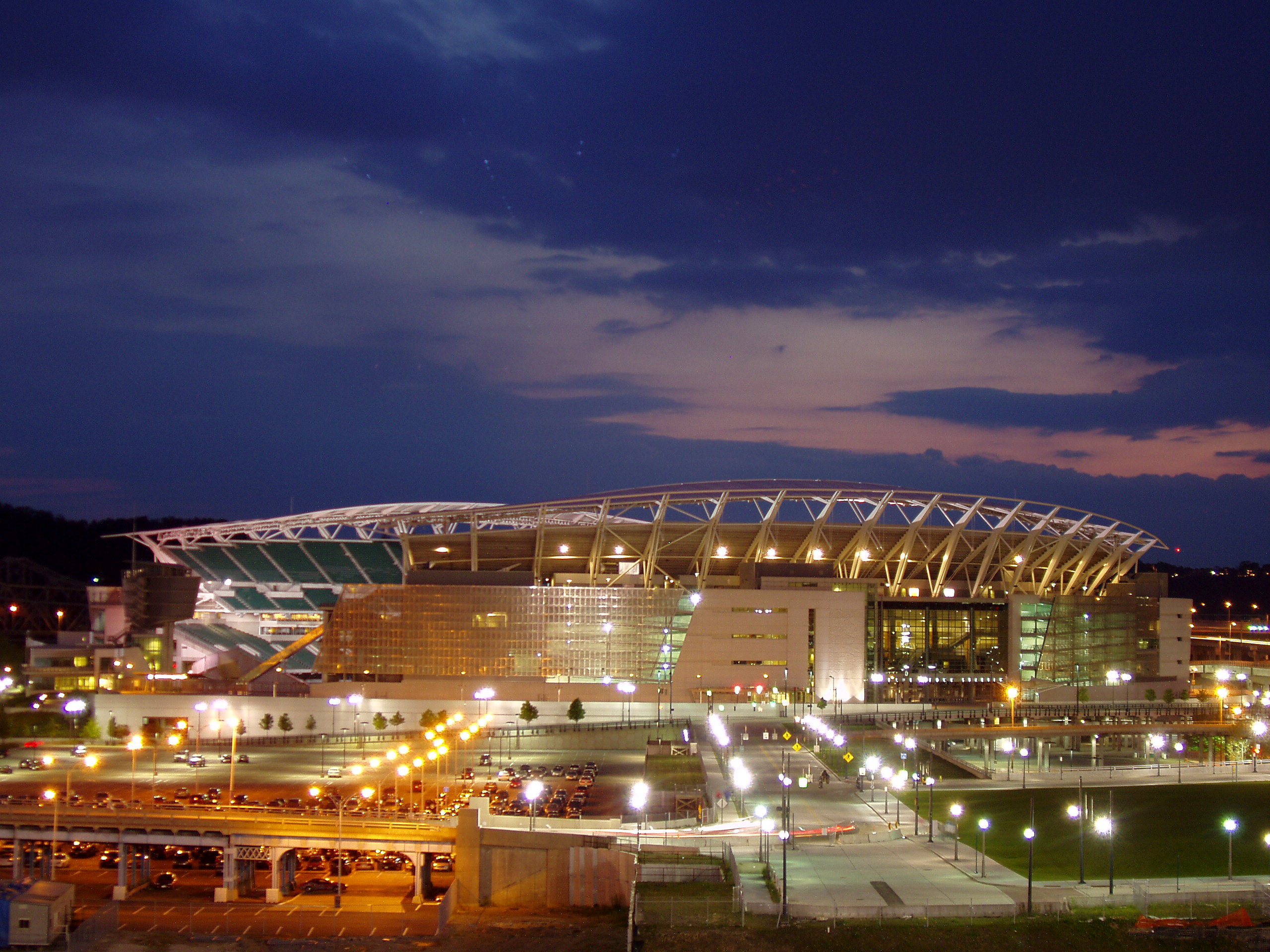
The Bengals have played in Paul Brown Stadium since 2000.

This is a complete list of Cincinnati Bengals head coaches. There have been ten head coaches for the Cincinnati Bengals of the National Football League (NFL). A professional American football team based in Cincinnati, Ohio, the Bengals are a member of the North Division of the American Football Conference (AFC). The Bengals franchise was founded in 1968 as a member of the Western Division of the American Football League (AFL), before merging with the NFL in 1970.

The current head coach is Zac Taylor, who was hired after the 2018 season. Taylor replaced Marvin Lewis, who remains the Bengals all-time leader in seasons coached, games coached, wins, and playoff games coached. Three coaches have won a conference championship with the team: Forrest Gregg in 1981, Sam Wyche in 1988 and Taylor in 2021. Gregg leads all coaches in winning percentage with .561. Dick LeBeau had the lowest winning percentage, with .267. Of the ten Bengals head coaches, three have been elected to the Pro Football Hall of Fame: Paul Brown, Forrest Gregg, and Dick LeBeau (although only Brown was inducted as a coach, the other two were inducted as players). Two former players have been head coach for the Bengals: Sam Wyche and Bruce Coslet.

== Key ==
#	Number of coaches (Note: A running total of the number of coaches of the Bengals. Thus, any coach who has two or more terms as head coach is only counted once.)
Yrs	Years coached
First	First season coached
Last	Last season coached
GC	Games Coached
W	Wins
L	Loses
T	Ties
Win%	Win – Loss percentage
†	Elected into the Pro Football Hall of Fame as a coach
‡	Elected into the Pro Football Hall of Fame as a player
*	Spent entire NFL head coaching career with the Bengals

== Coaches ==
Note: Statistics are accurate through the end of the 2025 NFL season.

#	Image	Name	Term (Note: Each year is linked to an article about that particular NFL season.)			Regular season					Playoffs				Accomplishments	Ref.
#	Image	Name	Yrs	First	Last	GC	W	L	T	Win%	GC	W	L	Win%	Accomplishments	Ref.
1		Paul Brown^{†}	8	1968	1975	112	55	56	1	.495	3	0	3	.000	Inducted Pro Football Hall of Fame (1967); 2 AFC Central Championships (1970, 1973); 3 Playoff Berths; 2 UPI NFL Coach of the Year Awards (1969, 1970)	
2		Bill Johnson*	3	1976	1978 (Note: Homer Rice replaced Bill Johnson as head coach after the Bengals started 0–5. The team dipped to marks of 0–8 and 1–12 before rebounding under Rice to win the last three games.)	33	18	15	0	.545	—					
3		Homer Rice	2	1978	1979	27	8	19	0	.296	—					
4		Forrest Gregg^{‡}	4	1980	1983	57	32	25	0	.561	4	2	2	.500	1 AFC Championship (1981); 1 AFC Central Championship (1981); 2 Playoff Berths; 1 UPI NFL Coach of the Year Award (1981)	
5		Sam Wyche	8	1984	1991	121	61	66	0	.480	5	3	2	.600	1 AFC Championship (1988); 2 AFC Central Championships (1988, 1990); 2 Playoff Berths	
6		Dave Shula*	5	1992	1996 (Note: The Dave Shula era comes to a sudden end when he is fired after a 1–6 start. Bruce Coslet, the team's offensive coordinator, would replace Shula as head coach.)	71	19	52	0	.268	—					
7		Bruce Coslet	5	1996	2000 (Note: After being shut out in two of their first three games, coach Bruce Coslet resigned; he was replaced by defensive coordinator Dick LeBeau.)	60	21	39	0	.350	—					
8		Dick LeBeau^{‡}	3	2000	2002	45	12	33	0	.267	—					
9		Marvin Lewis*	16	2003	2018	256	131	122	3	.518	7	0	7	.000	4 AFC North Championships (2005, 2009, 2013, 2015); 7 Playoff Berths; 1 AP NFL Coach of the Year Award (2009)	
10		Zac Taylor*	7	2019	present	116	52	63	1	.453	7	5	2	.714	1 AFC Championship (2021); 2 AFC North Championships (2021, 2022); 2 Playoff Berths	
Totals			59	1968	2025	904	409	490	5	.455	26	10	16	.385		
