= Sam Shade =

American football player and coach (born 1973)

Alabama A&M Bulldogs
- Title: Head coach

Personal information
- Born: June 14, 1973 (age 53); Birmingham, Alabama, U.S.
- Listed height: 6 ft 0 in (1.83 m)
- Listed weight: 205 lb (93 kg)

Career information
- High school: Birmingham (AL) Wenonah
- College: Alabama
- NFL draft: 1995: 4th round, 102nd overall pick

Career history

Playing
- Cincinnati Bengals (1995–1998); Washington Redskins (1999–2002)

Coaching
- Briarwood Christian HS (AL) (2004–2008) Volunteer coach; Samford (2009–2015) Special teams / defensive passing game coordinator; Georgia State (2017) Cornerbacks coach; Cleveland Browns (2018) Assistant special teams coach; Pinson Valley HS (AL) (2020–2021) Head coach; Miles (2022–2024) Head coach; Alabama A&M (2025–present) Head coach

Awards and highlights
- As a player: National champion (1992); Second-team All-SEC (1994); As a coach: SIAC (2024); SWAC East Division (2026)

Career NFL statistics
- Total tackles: 528
- Sacks: 8.5
- Forced fumbles: 3
- Fumble recoveries: 9
- Interceptions: 10
- Defensive touchdowns: 1
- Stats at Pro Football Reference

Head coaching record
- Regular season: 30–25 (.545)
- Postseason: 1–1 (.500)
- Career: 31–26 (.544)

Samuel Richard Shade (born June 14, 1973) is an American football coach and former player. He is the head football coach for Alabama A&M University, a position he has held since 2025. He played eight seasons in the National Football League (NFL) from 1995 to 2002 as a safety for the Cincinnati Bengals and the Washington Redskins. Shade played college football at the University of Alabama and was selected in the fourth round of the 1995 NFL draft.

== NFL career statistics ==
Legend
**Bold**	Career high

=== Regular season ===
Year	Team	Games		Tackles				Interceptions				Fumbles			
Year	Team	GP	GS	Comb	Solo	Ast	Sck	Int	Yds	TD	Lng	FF	FR	Yds	TD
1995	CIN	16	2	16	14	2	0.0	0	0	0	0	0	0	0	0
1996	CIN	12	0	7	5	2	0.0	0	0	0	0	0	0	0	0
1997	CIN	16	12	96	81	15	**4.0**	1	21	0	21	**1**	1	0	0
1998	CIN	16	15	78	60	18	1.0	**3**	**33**	0	**32**	**1**	2	**55**	**1**
1999	WAS	16	16	**115**	**89**	**26**	1.5	2	7	0	7	0	1	0	0
2000	WAS	16	14	98	83	15	1.0	2	15	0	15	0	**4**	1	0
2001	WAS	16	15	90	76	14	0.0	2	9	0	9	**1**	1	0	0
2002	WAS	9	3	28	21	7	1.0	0	0	0	0	0	0	0	0
Career		117	77	528	429	99	8.5	10	85	0	32	3	9	56	1

=== Playoffs ===
Year	Team	Games		Tackles				Interceptions				Fumbles			
Year	Team	GP	GS	Comb	Solo	Ast	Sck	Int	Yds	TD	Lng	FF	FR	Yds	TD
1999	WAS	2	2	9	6	3	2.0	0	0	0	0	1	0	0	0
Career		2	2	9	6	3	2.0	0	0	0	0	1	0	0	0

== Coaching career ==
=== Samford ===
Shade was the Special teams and defensive passing game coordinator at Samford, where he helped mentor current NFL defensive backs Corey White, Jaquiski Tartt, and James Bradberry.

=== Georgia State ===
On December 15, 2016, Shade was added to the staff at Georgia State as the cornerbacks coach.

=== Cleveland Browns ===
On February 7, 2018, it was announced that Shade had joined the Cleveland Browns' as an assistant special teams coach.

=== Pinson Valley High School ===
In February 2020, Pinson Valley High School named Shade as the replacement for Patrick Nix. In his first year as head coach, he helped bring the team back to a successful 12–2 season, including the state championship.

=== Miles ===
On January 26, 2022, Miles College introduced Shade as the head football coach.

=== Alabama A&M ===
On December 29, 2024, Alabama A&M University hired Shade as the school's 22nd head coach in program history.

== Head coaching record ==
=== College ===
Year	Team	Overall	Conference	Standing	Bowl/playoffs	AFCA^{#}	D2^{°}
**Miles Golden Bears** (Southern Intercollegiate Athletic Conference) (2022–2024)
2022	Miles	1–9	1–6	5th (West)			
2023	Miles	7–3	6–2	T–2nd			
2024	Miles	10–3	8–0	1st	**L** NCAA Division II Second Round	22	19
Miles:		18–15	15–8				
**Alabama A&M Bulldogs** (Southwestern Athletic Conference) (2025–present)
2025	Alabama A&M	4–8	1–7	5th (East)			
2026	Alabama A&M	9–3	6–2	1st (East)			
Alabama A&M:		13–11	7–9				
Total:		31–26					
National championship Conference title Conference division title or championship game berth
