= Chris Shula =

American football player and coach (born 1986)

Los Angeles Rams
- Title: Defensive coordinator

Personal information
- Born: February 5, 1986 (age 40); Miami, Florida, U.S.
- Listed height: 5 ft 11 in (1.80 m)
- Listed weight: 219 lb (99 kg)

Career information
- Position: Linebacker
- High school: St. Thomas Aquinas (Fort Lauderdale, Florida)
- College: Miami (OH) (2004–2008)
- NFL draft: 2009: undrafted

Career history
- Ball State (2010) Assistant linebackers coach; Indiana (2011–2013) Graduate assistant; John Carroll (2014) Defensive coordinator; San Diego Chargers (2015–2016) Defensive quality control coach; Los Angeles Rams (2017–present); Assistant linebackers coach (2017–2018); Outside linebackers coach (2019–2020); Linebackers coach (2021); Pass game coordinator & defensive backs coach (2022); Pass rush coordinator & linebackers coach (2023); Defensive coordinator (2024–present)

Awards and highlights
- Super Bowl champion (LVI)
- Coaching profile at Pro Football Reference

Christopher Shula (born February 5, 1986) is a former American professional football coach and former linebacker who is the defensive coordinator for the Los Angeles Rams of the National Football League (NFL). He played college football at Miami (OH) from 2004 to 2008.

Shula was born in Miami, Florida. His father, Dave, was a football coach, and the family lived in Florida, Texas, and Ohio. Shula is also a grandson of Don Shula and a nephew of Mike Shula. He attended high school in Fort Lauderdale, Florida. After graduation from high school in 2004, Shula returned to Ohio and enrolled at Miami University and played linebacker for the RedHawks, starting for two seasons.

From 2010 to 2013, Shula was a graduate assistant coach at Ball State University and Indiana University Bloomington where Kevin Wilson was head coach. In 2014, he landed his first full time assistant job as the defensive coordinator at the John Carroll University. After leading John Carroll to the NCAA Division III quarterfinals in 2014, Shula moved defensive quality control coach of the NFL's San Diego Chargers, where he worked under Mike McCoy.

Shula accepted the job as assistant linebackers coach for the Los Angeles Rams in 2017, where he worked under his former college teammate, Sean McVay. Shula helped lead the team to two Super Bowl appearances and seven NFL playoff berths.

== Early life ==
Shula was born on February 5, 1986, in Miami, Florida. He attended St. Thomas Aquinas in Fort Lauderdale, Florida.

== Playing career ==
Pre-draft measurables
Height	Weight
5 ft 10 3/4 in (1.80 m)	228 lb (103 kg)
Values from Pro Day

Shula played linebacker for the Miami RedHawks from 2004 until 2008, where he was teammates with Sean McVay.

== Coaching career ==
=== Ball State ===
In 2010, Shula was hired as the assistant linebackers coach at Ball State University.

=== Indiana ===
In 2011, Shula joined Indiana University as a graduate assistant.

=== John Carroll ===
In 2014, Shula was hired as the defensive coordinator at John Carroll University.

=== San Diego Chargers ===
In 2015, Shula was hired by the San Diego Chargers as a defensive quality control coach under head coach Mike McCoy.

=== Los Angeles Rams ===
In 2017, Shula was hired by the Los Angeles Rams as their assistant linebackers coach under head coach Sean McVay. In 2019, Shula was promoted to outside linebackers coach.

On February 23, 2021, Shula was promoted to linebackers coach. That year, the Rams became Super Bowl champions when the Rams defeated the Cincinnati Bengals in Super Bowl LVI. In 2022, Shula was promoted to pass game coordinator and defensive backs coach. In 2023, Shula was promoted to pass rush coordinator and linebackers coach.

On February 2, 2024, Shula was promoted to defensive coordinator for the Rams, replacing Raheem Morris, following his departure to become the head coach of the Atlanta Falcons.

== Personal life ==
Chris is the son of former Cincinnati Bengals head coach Dave Shula. He is also the grandson of the late Hall of Fame coach Don Shula. Shula's uncle, Mike, was formerly head coach at Alabama and worked as an offensive coach for several NFL teams, most recently serving as the offensive coordinator for the South Carolina Gamecocks.
