= Jeff Blake =

American football player (born 1970)

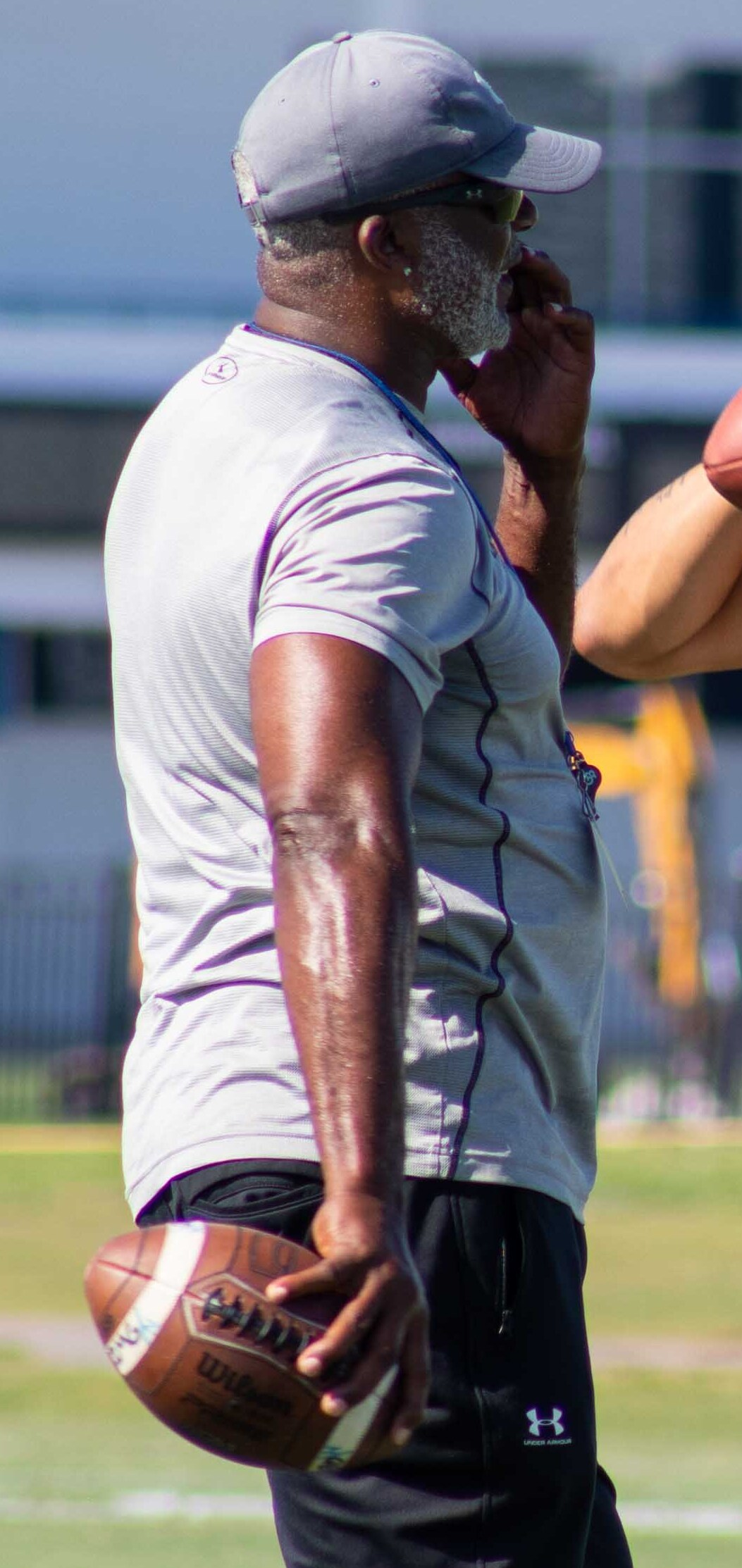
- Blake in 2021

No. 9, 8, 18, 11
- Position: Quarterback

Personal information
- Born: December 4, 1970 (age 55); Daytona Beach, Florida, U.S.
- Listed height: 6 ft 1 in (1.85 m)
- Listed weight: 223 lb (101 kg)

Career information
- High school: Seminole (Sanford, Florida)
- College: East Carolina (1988–1991)
- NFL draft: 1992: 6th round, 166th overall pick

Career history
- New York Jets (1992–1993); Cincinnati Bengals (1994–1999); New Orleans Saints (2000–2001); Baltimore Ravens (2002); Arizona Cardinals (2003); Philadelphia Eagles (2004); Chicago Bears (2005)

Awards and highlights
- Pro Bowl (1995); Second-team All-American (1991); Second team All-South Independent (1991)

Career NFL statistics
- Passing attempts: 3,241
- Passing completions: 1,827
- Completion percentage: 56.4%
- TD–INT: 134–99
- Passing yards: 21,711
- Passer rating: 78
- Rushing yards: 2,027
- Rushing touchdowns: 14
- Stats at Pro Football Reference

Jeffrey Bertrand Coleman Blake (born December 4, 1970) is an American former professional football quarterback who played in the National Football League (NFL) for 14 seasons. He was a member of seven teams during his NFL career, most notably the Cincinnati Bengals.

Blake played college football for the East Carolina Pirates, earning second-team All-American honors in 1991. He was selected in the sixth round of the 1992 NFL draft by the New York Jets, where he spent his first two seasons. His longest stint was with the Bengals from 1994 to 1999, receiving Pro Bowl honors and setting the record for the longest Pro Bowl touchdown at 93 yards. Blake spent the second half of his career playing for the New Orleans Saints from 2000 to 2001 and one season each with the Baltimore Ravens, Arizona Cardinals, Philadelphia Eagles, and Chicago Bears.

== Early life ==
Blake was born on December 4, 1970, in Daytona Beach, Florida, to Peggy and Emory Blake. His father was a slotback for the Canadian Football League with the Toronto Argonauts. Tragedy struck on July 5, 1976, when his mother died when trying to rescue her younger sibling from drowning at Wekiwa Springs State Park. Emory decided to cancel a tryout scheduled with the Tampa Bay Buccaneers and find a job to be with his only son. He was soon hired as a physical education teacher and coach in the school system of Sanford, Florida. Blake was near his father's side growing up, whether that involved singing in the choir at Progress Missionary Baptist Church to his pastor father or as a sideline helper at Seminole High School to his coach father.

Blake was a star quarterback at Seminole High School in Florida, with his father Emory as offensive coordinator. When it came to recruiting, Florida, Miami, and Florida State tried to recruit him outside of the quarterback position, which he resisted. Of the three to actually offer him a chance to play the QB position, Blake chose East Carolina University, who heavily recruited him and gave him confidence that he could play at the school because "They were used to having black quarterbacks there...so in their eyes I was simply a quarterback."

== College career ==
After playing sparingly in his first two years at East Carolina, he got more time to play as the starter in 1990. The team went 5-6. In 1991 they won eleven games, their most wins in a season to date, while Blake finished sixth in the 1991 Heisman Trophy voting and the Pirates finished ranked #9 in the AP poll at the end of the season. He was inducted into the East Carolina Hall of Fame in 2007.

== Professional career ==
Pre-draft measurables
Height	Weight	Arm length	Hand span	40-yard dash	10-yard split	20-yard split	20-yard shuttle	Vertical jump
5 ft 11 3/4 in (1.82 m)	202 lb (92 kg)	32 7/8 in (0.84 m)	8 1/2 in (0.22 m)	4.86 s	1.68 s	2.81 s	4.60 s	30.5 in (0.77 m)
All values from NFL Combine

Blake was selected in the sixth round by the New York Jets in 1992 and played in just 3 games before being cut the following offseason when head coach Bruce Coslet was fired. Coslet was hired as the offensive coordinator for the Cincinnati Bengals and brought Blake with him. The roster already had David Klingler as the starter and Donald Hollas as the presumed backup. The 1994 Bengals were 0–7 before Blake was thrust into the starting role due to injuries by Klingler and Hollas.

He threw for 243 yards and two touchdowns in his debut against the Dallas Cowboys in a narrow 23–20 loss. Blake went 3–6 as a starter, and threw for 2,154 yards with 14 touchdowns to 9 interceptions.

He was named the starter for the 1995 season. He established great rapport with Bengal receivers Carl Pickens and Darnay Scott, helping the former vie for the receiving title in 1995. Blake threw for 3,822 yards with 28 touchdowns to 17 interceptions and made the Pro Bowl. One writer later argued that his play helped influence Ohio voters in Hamilton County to approve a sales tax increase to help fund a new stadium for the team, as the measure passed in March 1996 (the stadium opened in 2000). He signed a five-year, $13.1 million contract not long before the Pro Bowl selection.

The 1996 season was the only season between 1991 and 2002 that did not result in a losing record for the team. They went 8-8. Blake threw for 3,624 yards with 24 touchdowns to 14 interceptions.

In 1997, he started just 11 games (with Boomer Esiason starting the other games), Blake threw for 2,125 yards with 8 touchdowns and 7 interceptions.

In 1998, Neil O'Donnell got the nod in all but two games. Blake was given the bulk of the starts in 1999 after the team drafted Akili Smith. Blake went 3-9 and threw for 2,670 yards with 16 touchdowns to 12 interceptions.

Frustrated by management, Blake left the Bengals after the 1999 season in free agency. He signed with the New Orleans Saints as a free agent. Blake started 11 games at quarterback before breaking his foot late in the 2000 season and being replaced by Aaron Brooks. He threw for 2,025 yards with 13 touchdowns and 9 interceptions as the Saints were 7–4 with him as starter as Brooks led the Saints to the playoffs. Blake left the Saints after the 2001 season saw him get no starts in favor of Brooks. He started 11 games for the Baltimore Ravens in 2002 (after injury to Chris Redman) and 13 games for the Cardinals in 2003, but neither team expressed interest in signing him to a long-term contract.

The Chicago Bears signed Blake on August 15, 2005 after starting quarterback Rex Grossman suffered an ankle injury in the preseason. Blake backed up rookie quarterback Kyle Orton and only appeared in two games during the 2005 NFL season. He expressed interest in returning to Chicago for another season. The Bears instead signed journeyman quarterback Brian Griese in free agency.

At the conclusion of his fourteen-year career, Blake amassed 21,711 passing yards, with 134 touchdown passes, and 99 interceptions. A mobile quarterback, Blake also ran for 2,027 career rushing yards and 14 touchdowns. He made 100 career starts.

== Career statistics ==
Legend
**Bold**	Career high

=== NFL ===
Year	Team	Games			Passing									Rushing					Sacks	
Year	Team	GP	GS	Record	Cmp	Att	Pct	Yds	Y/A	Lng	TD	Int	Rtg	Att	Yds	Avg	Lng	TD	Sck	Yds
1992	NYJ	3	0	0–0	4	9	44.4	40	4.4	19	0	1	18.1	2	-2	-1.0	1	0	2	7
1994	CIN	10	9	3–6	156	306	51.0	2,154	7.0	76	14	9	76.9	37	204	5.5	16	1	19	120
1995	CIN	16	16	7–9	**326**	**567**	57.5	**3,822**	6.7	**88**	**28**	**17**	82.1	53	309	5.8	**30**	2	24	152
1996	CIN	16	16	**8–8**	308	549	56.1	3,624	6.6	61	24	14	80.3	**72**	317	4.4	18	2	**44**	**278**
1997	CIN	11	11	3–8	184	317	58.0	2,125	6.7	50	8	7	77.6	45	234	5.2	16	**3**	39	244
1998	CIN	8	2	1–1	51	93	54.8	739	**7.9**	67	3	3	78.2	15	103	**6.9**	18	0	15	79
1999	CIN	14	12	3–9	215	389	55.3	2,670	6.9	76	16	12	77.6	63	**332**	5.3	16	2	30	168
2000	NOR	11	11	7–4	184	302	60.9	2,025	6.7	49	13	9	82.7	57	243	4.3	20	1	24	150
2001	NOR	1	0	0–0	0	1	0.0	0	0.0	0	0	0	39.6	1	-1	-1.0	-1	0	0	0
2002	BAL	11	10	4–6	165	295	55.9	2,084	7.1	77	13	11	77.3	39	106	2.7	17	1	30	203
2003	ARI	13	13	3–10	208	367	56.7	2,247	6.1	71	13	15	69.6	30	177	5.9	19	2	19	132
2004	PHI	3	0	0–0	18	37	48.6	126	3.4	21	1	1	54.6	3	6	2.0	8	0	2	17
2005	CHI	2	0	0–0	8	9	**88.9**	55	6.1	17	1	0	**129.2**	1	-1	-1.0	-1	0	0	0
Career		119	100	39–61	1,827	3,241	56.4	21,711	6.7	88	134	99	78.0	418	2,027	4.8	30	14	248	1,550

=== College ===
Season	Team	GP	Passing						
Season	Team	GP	Cmp	Att	Pct	Yds	TD	Int	Rtg
1988	East Carolina	3	4	9	44.4	62	0	0	102.3
1989	East Carolina	11	37	71	52.1	488	2	2	113.5
1990	East Carolina	11	116	219	53.0	1,510	13	**10**	121.3
1991	East Carolina	11	**203**	**368**	**55.2**	**3,073**	**28**	8	**146.1**
College career		34	360	667	54.0	5,133	43	20	133.9

== Personal life ==
Blake settled in Austin, Texas after retirement. He met his wife Lewanna as a sophomore in college, and they had four children in Emory, Torre, Trey, and Lahne. His son Emory won a national championship with Auburn in 2010. He threw footballs for his son for Auburn's Pro Day. His daughter, Torre, auditioned for The Voice in 2024 and she chose Snoop Dogg as her coach. In 2017, he expressed interest in trying to open a football academy, as he had done a handful of sessions with football players over the years. He worked as a coach at IMG Academy as Director of the QB Academy. In 2023, he was hired to serve as head coach and offensive coordinator for Valley Sports Academy with the Prepstar 7-on-7 football team in Lake Hallie, Wisconsin.
