= Larry Peccatiello =

American football coach (born 1935)

Personal information
- Born: December 21, 1935 (age 90); Newark, New Jersey, U.S.

Career information
- College: William & Mary

Career history
- William & Mary (1958–1968) Defensive coordinator; Navy (1969–1970) Defensive coordinator; Rice (1971) Defensive coordinator; Houston Oilers (1972–1975) Linebackers coach; Seattle Seahawks (1976–1980) Linebackers coach/defensive coordinator; Washington Redskins (1981–1984) Linebackers coach/co-defensive coordinator; Washington Redskins (1985–1993) Defensive coordinator; Cincinnati Bengals (1994–1996) Defensive coordinator; Detroit Lions (1997–2000) Defensive coordinator

Awards and highlights
- 3× Super Bowl champion (XVII), (XXII), (XXVI); 90 Greatest Washington Commanders

Larry Peccatiello (born December 21, 1935) is an American former professional football coach in the National Football League (NFL). He was an assistant coach with the Washington Redskins from 1981 to 1993. For most of that time, he was the defensive coordinator, either alone or sharing it with Richie Petitbon. He was Petitbon's defensive coordinator during his lone season as head coach in 1993.

After Petitbon was fired after the 1993 season, incoming coach Norv Turner jettisoned the remaining staff. From 1994 to 1996, he was defensive coordinator for the Cincinnati Bengals under head coach Dave Shula. When Shula was fired following the 1996 season, incoming coach Bruce Coslet jettisoned the remaining staff.

From 1997 to 2001, he served in the same role for the Detroit Lions, after which he retired. He was first hired by Lions head coach Bobby Ross, and also served under Gary Moeller when Ross resigned during the 2000 season.

One achievement Peccatiello is particularly proud of was his 1983 season with Washington, where he led the defense to 61 takeaways.

Peccatiello earned three Super Bowl rings during his time with the Redskins. In 2010, Peccatiello was inducted into the Virginia Sports Hall of Fame. Additionally, Peccatiello has been inducted into the Newark, New Jersey Hall of Fame, as well as The College of William & Mary Hall of Fame. In 2022, Peccatiello was one of 10 inductees to "Washington's Greatest" in honor of the 90th Anniversary of the team.
