= Brett Wallerstedt =

American football player (born 1970)

No. 52, 91, 53
- Position: Linebacker

Personal information
- Born: November 24, 1970 (age 55); Tacoma, Washington, U.S.
- Listed height: 6 ft 1 in (1.85 m)
- Listed weight: 240 lb (109 kg)

Career information
- High school: Manhattan (Manhattan, Kansas)
- College: Arizona State
- NFL draft: 1993: 6th round, 143rd overall pick

Career history
- Phoenix Cardinals (1993); Denver Broncos (1994); Cincinnati Bengals (1994–1996); St. Louis Rams (1997)

Awards and highlights
- Third-team All-American (1992); First-team All-Pac-10 (1992); Second-team All-Pac-10 (1991)
- Stats at Pro Football Reference

Brett Robert Wallerstedt (born November 24, 1970) is an American former professional football player who was a linebacker in the National Football League (NFL). He played in the NFL for the Phoenix Cardinals in 1993, the Cincinnati Bengals from 1994 to 1995 and for the St. Louis Rams in 1997 in addition to a short offseason stint with the Denver Broncos in 1994. He was selected by the Cardinals in the sixth round of the 1994 NFL draft. He played college football for the Arizona State Sun Devils.
