= Jeff Hill =

American football player (born 1972)

No. 16, 84
- Position: Wide receiver

Personal information
- Born: September 24, 1972 (age 54); Mount Healthy, Ohio, U.S.
- Listed height: 5 ft 11 in (1.80 m)
- Listed weight: 178 lb (81 kg)

Career information
- College: Purdue
- NFL draft: 1994: undrafted

Career history
- Cincinnati Bengals (1994–1996)
- Stats at Pro Football Reference

Jeffrey Martin Hill (born September 24, 1972) is an American former professional football player who was a wide receiver for the Cincinnati Bengals of the National Football League (NFL). He played college football for the Purdue Boilermakers.
