= Carl Pickens =

American football player (born 1970)

No. 80, 81, 86
- Position: Wide receiver

Personal information
- Born: March 23, 1970 (age 56); Murphy, North Carolina, U.S.
- Listed height: 6 ft 2 in (1.88 m)
- Listed weight: 206 lb (93 kg)

Career information
- High school: Murphy
- College: Tennessee (1989–1991)
- NFL draft: 1992: 2nd round, 31st overall pick

Career history
- Cincinnati Bengals (1992–1999); Tennessee Titans (2000); Dallas Cowboys (2001)*
- * Offseason or practice squad member only

Awards and highlights
- NFL Offensive Rookie of the Year (1992); 2× Second-team All-Pro (1995, 1996); 2× Pro Bowl (1995, 1996); NFL receiving touchdowns co-leader (1995); PFWA All-Rookie Team (1992); First-team All-American (1991); 2× First-team All-SEC (1990, 1991)

Career NFL statistics
- Receptions: 540
- Receiving yards: 7,129
- Receiving touchdowns: 63
- Stats at Pro Football Reference

Carl McNally Pickens (born March 23, 1970) is an American former professional football player who was a wide receiver in the National Football League (NFL) for the Cincinnati Bengals and Tennessee Titans. He played college football for the Tennessee Volunteers, earning first-team All-American honors in 1991.

== Early life ==
Pickens attended Murphy High School in Murphy, North Carolina, a small town in the Smoky Mountains about 100 miles from Knoxville, Tennessee. He played free safety and wide receiver there, intercepting 15 passes in three seasons and catching 71 passes, including 24 for touchdowns, as a senior, when he was a Parade magazine All-American. He also returned punts and kickoffs, and punted. He also excelled at basketball, averaging 27 points per game and attracting the interest of many college programs.

== College career ==
Pickens played college football for the University of Tennessee from 1989 to 1991, where he started his career as a safety and was named a Freshman All-American and All-SEC selection. He moved to wide receiver, where he caught 109 passes for 1,875 yards and 13 touchdowns, and made the College Football All-America Team as a junior. He did not return to Tennessee for his senior year. His college receiving statistics were:

- 1989: 7 catches for 81 yards with 2 TD
- 1990: 53 catches for 917 yards with 6 TD
- 1991: 49 catches for 877 yards with 5 TD

In 2023, Pickens was inducted into the Tennessee Athletics Hall of Fame.

== Professional career ==
Pre-draft measurables
Height	Weight	Arm length	Hand span
6 ft 2 1/4 in (1.89 m)	206 lb (93 kg)	31 1/2 in (0.80 m)	8 1/4 in (0.21 m)

=== Cincinnati Bengals ===
Pickens was selected in the second round (31st overall) of the 1992 NFL draft by the Cincinnati Bengals.

Pickens made his NFL debut in Week 1 of the 1992 season against the Seahawks. In Week 3 against the Packers, he had a 95-yard punt return for a touchdown. He recorded 26 receptions for 326 yards and one touchdown in 16 games and ten starts as a rookie. For the 1992 season, he was named the NFL Offensive Rookie of the Year by the Associated Press. He was named to the PFWA All-Rookie Team. In Week 8 of the 1993 season against the Oilers, he had seven receptions for 127 yards in the loss for his first game over the century mark in the NFL. He had his first multi-touchdown game in the NFL in Week 17 against the Falcons in a 21–17 win. He finished the 1993 season with 43 receptions for 565 yards and six touchdowns in 13 games and 12 starts. The 1994 season marked a breakout year for Pickens. He had 11 receptions for 188 yards and three touchdowns in a victory over the Oilers in Week 11. The game against the Oilers started a four-game streak of going over 100 yards for Pickens. He finished the season with 71 receptions for 1,127 yards and 11 touchdowns.

Pickens had five consecutive games with a touchdown to start the 1995 season. The streak was bookended by a three-touchdown game against the Dolphins. He had five games going over the 100-yard mark, three games with at least two touchdowns, and 14 games with at least one touchdown on the 1995 season. In the 1995 season, he set a Bengals record for receptions in a single season with 99, and touchdown catches with 17. He totaled 1,234 receiving yards on the year. He later surpassed his own record by recording 100 receptions in 1996. From 1994 to 1995, Pickens became the first NFL player to record at least five receptions and a receiving touchdown in eight straight games.

In Week 13 of the 1996 season, he had 11 receptions for 176 yards and three touchdowns against the Falcons in a 41–31 victory. He earned AFC Offensive Player of the Week for his game against the Falcons. He followed that up with another three-touchdown game in a loss the Jaguars. In the 1996 season, he had 100 receptions for 1,180 yards and 12 touchdowns. In Week 4 of the 1997 season, Pickens had eight receptions for 125 yards in a loss to the Broncos. He finished the 1997 season with 52 receptions for 695 yards and five touchdowns in 12 games. He missed the last four games being inactive and eventually put on injured reserve. In Week 4 of the 1998 season, Pickens had seven receptions for 120 yards and two touchdowns in a loss to the Ravens. In the following game, he had 13 receptions for 204 yards and one touchdown in a win over the Steelers. He earned AFC Offensive Player of the Week for his game against the Steelers. In the 1998 season, he had 82 receptions for 1,023 yards and five touchdowns in 16 games and starts. In Week 13 of the 1999 season, against the 49ers, Pickens had seven receptions for 107 yards and two touchdowns. In the 1999 season, Pickens had 57 receptions for 737 yards and six touchdowns.

In his nine NFL seasons, Pickens recorded 540 receptions for 7,129 yards and 63 touchdowns, while also gaining another 307 yards and one touchdown on punt returns. His 63 touchdown receptions were a franchise record until surpassed by Chad Johnson in 2010.

He is also known for the "Carl Pickens Clause". This was a loyalty clause that the Bengals created and added to Pickens's contract which would cause him to forfeit all or some of his signing bonus if he insulted the organization in public. This clause has since been used in contracts with other players.

=== Tennessee Titans ===
Pickens signed a one-year contract with the Tennessee Titans on July 31, 2000. With the Titans, he had his first winning season of his career and his first playoff appearance. He finished the regular season with ten receptions for 242 yards in nine games and six starts.

=== Dallas Cowboys ===
On April 5, 2001, Pickens signed as a free agent with the Dallas Cowboys. He announced his retirement on May 30.

== NFL career statistics ==
Year	Team	Games		Receiving					Rushing					Punt returns				
Year	Team	GP	GS	Rec	Yds	Avg	Lng	TD	Att	Yds	Avg	Lng	TD	Ret	Yds	Avg	Lng	TD
1992	CIN	16	10	26	326	12.5	38	1	—	—	—	—	0	18	229	12.7	95	1
1993	CIN	13	12	43	565	13.1	36	6	—	—	—	—	0	4	16	4.0	9	0
1994	CIN	15	15	71	1,127	15.9	70	11	—	—	—	—	0	9	62	6.9	16	0
1995	CIN	16	16	99	1,234	12.5	68	17	1	6	6.0	6	0	5	-2	-0.4	4	0
1996	CIN	16	16	100	1,180	11.8	61	12	2	2	1.0	2	0	1	2	2.0	2	0
1997	CIN	12	12	52	695	13.4	50	5	1	-6	-6.0	-6	0	—	—	—	—	0
1998	CIN	16	16	82	1,023	12.5	67	5	2	4	2.0	4	0	—	—	—	—	0
1999	CIN	16	14	57	737	12.9	75	6	—	—	—	—	0	—	—	—	—	0
2000	TEN	9	6	10	242	24.2	67	0	—	—	—	—	0	—	—	—	—	0
Career		129	117	540	7,129	13.2	75	63	6	6	1.0	6	0	37	307	8.3	95	1

== Personal life ==
Pickens is a devoted family man and now resides in Georgia.
