= Ki-Jana Carter =

American football player (born 1973)

No. 32, 23
- Position: Running back

Personal information
- Born: September 12, 1973 (age 53); Westerville, Ohio, U.S.
- Listed height: 5 ft 10 in (1.78 m)
- Listed weight: 226 lb (103 kg)

Career information
- High school: Westerville South
- College: Penn State (1992–1994)
- NFL draft: 1995: 1st round, 1st overall pick

Career history
- Cincinnati Bengals (1995–1999); Washington Redskins (2001); Green Bay Packers (2002)*; New Orleans Saints (2003–2004)
- * Offseason or practice squad member only

Awards and highlights
- Unanimous All-American (1994); First-team All-Big Ten (1994); Second-team All-Big Ten (1993); Rose Bowl MVP (1995)

Career NFL statistics
- Rushing yards: 1,144
- Rushing average: 3.6
- Rushing touchdowns: 20
- Receptions: 66
- Receiving yards: 469
- Receiving touchdowns: 1
- Stats at Pro Football Reference
- College Football Hall of Fame

Kenneth Leonard "Ki-Jana" Carter (/kiːˈdʒɑːnə/ kee-JAWN-ə); born September 12, 1973) is an American former professional football running back who played in the National Football League (NFL) for eight seasons. He played college football for the Penn State Nittany Lions, earning consensus All-American honors in 1994 en route to being named MVP of the 1995 Rose Bowl.

Carter was selected first overall in the 1995 NFL draft by the Cincinnati Bengals, but after suffering a torn ligament in his knee during his first preseason game, he struggled with injuries for the remainder of his career. Missing most of his five seasons with the Bengals due to injury, Carter played his final three seasons in a limited role for the Washington Redskins and New Orleans Saints. To date, he is the most recent running back taken first overall. He was inducted to the College Football Hall of Fame in 2026.

== Early life ==
Carter was born in Westerville, Ohio. His nickname, "Ki-Jana", is from a character in the movie Shaft in Africa and he has gone by that name since his birth. At Westerville South High School, he starred in football, basketball, and track. In football, he was a 1991 Parade magazine high school All-American.

== College career ==
Carter attended Pennsylvania State University, where he was a standout player for coach Joe Paterno's Nittany Lions football teams from 1992 to 1994, along with a strong group of offensive players including future NFL starters Jeff Hartings, Joe Jurevicius, Kerry Collins, O.J. McDuffie, Bobby Engram and Kyle Brady. Together, this explosive offense propelled the 1994 Penn State team to a 12–0 undefeated season. At Penn State Carter wore the number 32, which had been worn by running back Blair Thomas. Despite playing only three seasons, he is still in the top ten among Penn State running backs, having compiled 2,829 yards rushing on 395 attempts and scoring 34 touchdowns. His best single game came against the Michigan State Spartans in 1994, when he rushed for 227 yards on 27 carries and scored five touchdowns. Carter helped lead the 1994 Penn State football team to an undefeated record and a berth in the Rose Bowl, was recognized as a consensus first-team All-American, and finished second in the Heisman Trophy voting. He earned co-MVP honors in the Rose Bowl, rushing for 156 yards and three touchdowns on 21 carries. He ran for an 83-yard touchdown on the first offensive play of the game, which is the third-longest run in Rose Bowl history and the longest run in Penn State bowl history. Carter also added touchdown runs of 17 and three yards in the third quarter. The Rose Bowl was Carter's final game as a Nittany Lion, as he was encouraged by Paterno to forgo his senior season and enter the NFL draft. "This is the first time I have told anybody who has not graduated that I felt they ought to leave," Paterno said. The Tournament of Roses Association announced his induction into the Rose Bowl Hall of Fame as a member of the Class of 2014, a ceremony that took place in December 2014.

On January 14, 2026, Carter was inducted into the College Football Hall of Fame.

== Professional career ==
Pre-draft measurables
Height	Weight	Arm length	Hand span
5 ft 10 in (1.78 m)	227 lb (103 kg)	32 in (0.81 m)	9 3/8 in (0.24 m)
All values from NFL Combine

The Cincinnati Bengals selected Carter with the first overall pick of the 1995 NFL draft, where his running style drew comparisons to Emmitt Smith. He played for the Bengals from 1995 to 1999. They acquired the first pick in a trade with the expansion Carolina Panthers for the 5th and 36th picks.

Carter signed a seven-year, $19.2 million deal which included a $7.125 million signing bonus, which at the time was an NFL record contract for a rookie. There were also incentive clauses such as making an extra $100,000 if he scored 12 touchdowns in a season.

He played for the Washington Redskins in 2001. In 2002, Carter was signed by the Green Bay Packers, but did not make their final roster. He spent his final two seasons with the New Orleans Saints from 2003 to 2004. In seven NFL seasons, he played in 59 games, started 14 of them, and compiled 1,144 rushing yards and 20 touchdowns on 319 attempts, and 66 receptions for 469 yards and a touchdown.

=== Injuries ===
Carter tore a ligament in his knee on his third carry of his first preseason game of his rookie year and never fully recovered. He missed the entire 1995 season.

In 1997, he suffered a torn rotator cuff in his left shoulder with fears that he would miss the entire season.

In 1998, he missed the entire season after breaking his left wrist in a game against the Tennessee Oilers.

In 1999, he again missed the entire season after dislocating his right kneecap in a game against the Carolina Panthers.

== Career statistics ==
=== NFL ===
Legend
**Bold**	Career high

Year	Team	Games		Rushing					Receiving				
Year	Team	GP	GS	Att	Yds	Avg	Lng	TD	Rec	Yds	Avg	Lng	TD
1996	CIN	**16**	4	91	264	2.9	31	**8**	**22**	**169**	7.7	20	**1**
1997	CIN	15	**10**	**128**	**464**	3.6	**79**	7	21	157	7.5	**35**	0
1998	CIN	1	0	2	4	2.0	4	0	6	25	4.2	8	0
1999	CIN	3	0	6	15	2.5	8	1	3	24	8.0	11	0
2001	WAS	14	0	63	308	**4.9**	30	3	13	83	6.4	15	0
2003	NO	8	0	19	72	3.8	31	1	1	11	**11.0**	11	0
2004	NO	2	0	10	17	1.7	8	0	0	0	0	0	0
Career		59	14	319	1,144	3.6	79	20	66	469	7.1	35	1

=== College ===
Season	Team	Games	Rushing				Receiving				Kick returns			
Season	Team	GP	Att	Yds	Avg	TD	Rec	Yds	Avg	TD	Ret	Yds	Avg	TD
1992	Penn State	11	42	264	6.3	4	0	0	--	0	**4**	76	19.0	0
1993	Penn State	11	155	1,026	6.6	7	6	49	8.2	0	3	71	**23.7**	0
1994	Penn State	11	**198**	**1,539**	**7.8**	**23**	**14**	**123**	**8.8**	0	**4**	**81**	20.3	0
Career		33	395	2,829	7.2	34	20	172	8.6	0	11	228	20.7	0

== Life after football ==
Carter is now an entrepreneur and sports blogger at OPENSports.com. He founded Byoglobe, a print and promotional marketing material company, in 2008. He serves as the Sunrise, Florida-based company's chief executive officer.
