= Paul Alexander (American football) =

American football coach (born 1960)

Personal information
- Born: February 12, 1960; Rochester, New York, U.S.

Career information
- High school: Greece (NY) Cardinal Mooney
- College: Cortland

Career history
- Penn State (1983–1984) Graduate assistant; Michigan (1985–1986) Graduate assistant; Central Michigan (1987–1991) Offensive line coach; New York Jets (1992–1993) Tight ends coach; Cincinnati Bengals (1994–2002) Offensive line coach; Cincinnati Bengals (2003–2017) Offensive line coach & assistant head coach; Dallas Cowboys (2018) Offensive line coach; Potsdam Royals (2019) Offensive line consultant; Dresden Monarchs (2023) Head coach

Awards and highlights
- Head Coach 2023 Dresden Monarchs 13-3 overall record

Paul Alexander (born February 12, 1960) is an American football coach. He was the offensive line coach of the Cincinnati Bengals from 1994 to 2017. He also served as an assistant coach for the New York Jets and Dallas Cowboys. In March 2019 he decided to join the Potsdam Royals as an offensive line consultant. Since March 2023 he is the headcoach of the Dresden Monarchs.

== Playing career and education ==
Paul Alexander, a Spencerport, N.Y., native earned a bachelor's degree in physical education, with a minor in music, from SUNY Cortland in 1982. He played offensive tackle for the Red Dragons for three seasons from 1979 to 1981. Following his senior season he was selected as the college's first-ever Academic All American, named by College Sports Information Directors of America (CoSIDA). In 1982 Alexander was awarded as SUNY Cortland's Men's Athletic Association Athlete of the Year. In 1985 Alexander received a Master of Science Degree in Exercise Physiology from Penn State University. In 2012, Alexander was inducted into the C-Club Hall of Fame. In 2018, Alexander was the Commencement Speaker and received an Honorary Doctorate of Humane Letters from his alma mater, SUNY Cortland.

== Coaching career ==
Paul Alexander, a 36 year veteran NFL and major college football coach began coaching at Penn State as a graduate assistant, then University of Michigan and Central Michigan as an assistant for Hall of Fame Head Coaches Joe Paterno, Bo Shembechler and Herb Deromedi while coaching in the Aloha, Fiesta, Rose and California Citrus Bowls. Alexander was the offensive line coach of the Cincinnati Bengals from 1994 to 2017. He also served as an assistant coach for the New York Jets and Dallas Cowboys. During his tenure, he coached Pro Bowlers: Richmond Webb, John Jackson, Willie Anderson, Andrew Whitworth, Jerry Fontenot, Tyron Smith, Zack Martin and Travis Frederick along with Pro Bowl alternates Levi Jones, Eric Steinbach, Kevin Zeitler and Jeff Fain. Alexander coached in NFL playoff experiences in 2005, 2009, 2011, 2012, 2013, 2014 and 2015.

Alexander's offensive line paved the way for two NFL rushing records by Bengal's RB Corey Dillon. During his rookie season in 1997, Dillon rushed 39 times for 246 yards and 4 touchdowns in a 41-14 win over the Tennessee Oilers breaking Jim Brown's NFL rookie single game record that had stood for 40 years. On October 22, 2000, Dillon set an NFL record for most yards rushed in one game (278 yards) against the Denver Broncos, breaking Walter Payton's single-game mark of 275 yards set on November 20, 1977.

In 2015 Alexander was featured on the cover of Sports Illustrated in its article: "The Mozart behind the Bengals 6-0 record". In 2017, Pro Football Focus ranked his offensive line #1 statistically in pass protection over the 11 year life of their measure; also in 2017, he was once again recognized by Sports Illustrated as the top offensive line coach in the business and named to their "Dream Team Coaching Staff".

Alexander is credited for starting the first ever high school football camp devoted exclusively for linemen (Midwest Linemen Camp, Illinois Wesleyan, 1991 – current). He is also the creator of the Lev Sled, a blocking device manufactured by Rogers Athletic.

In 2018, he was hired as the new offensive line coach of the Dallas Cowboys. He took over an offensive line with 3 Pro Bowlers in Tyron Smith, Zack Martin and Travis Frederick, plus a rising talent in fourth-year right tackle La'el Collins. Frederick would end up missing the season on injured reserve, after being diagnosed with Guillain–Barré syndrome. Alexander was let go after the first seven games of the season and replaced with assistant offensive line coach Marc Colombo and senior assistant Hudson Houck. It was reported in the media, that the move came about because of the struggles on the offensive line in pass protection and with the new blocking techniques being implemented.

2019 Alexander began consulting for ProCoach.Network and trained first round draft picks Jonah Williams (Alabama drafted by Bengals) and Andre Dillard (Washington State drafted by Eagles). Among his 2019 clients were the Potsdam Royals (Germany), Penn State University along with various college and high school football teams. Alexander is a regular guest on SiriusXM NFL Channel.

In December 2022 the Dresden Monarchs of the German Football League announced that Paul Alexander will take over as head coach in March 2023 for the upcoming season. The 2023 season final record was 13-3 overall with the offense scoring an average of 40.1 points and 446 yards per game.

== Musician, author and speaker ==
In 2006, Alexander began piano lessons at the College Conservatory, University of Cincinnati along with his daughter as a father-daughter activity. The experience developed into Alexander becoming an accomplished pianist and author of the book "Perform … an NFL Coach Trains with a Concert Pianist" (a Journey for athletes, musicians, teachers and coaches) where he parallels the traits of elite performance between athletes and performing artists. In 2014, Alexander conducted Hamilton Fairfield Symphony Orchestra in Mozart's Eine Kleine Nachtmuzik. Alexander speaks extensively on elite performance throughout North America and Europe.
