= Bobby DePaul =

American football player, coach, and executive (born 1963)

Personal information
- Born: 1963 (age 62–63)

Career information
- College: Maryland

Career history
- Chicago Bears (2001–2010) Director of pro personnel

Awards and highlights
- Super Bowl champion (XXVI)

Bobby DePaul (born 1963) is the former director of pro personnel for the Chicago Bears of the National Football League (NFL).

== College ==
DePaul played linebacker at the University of Maryland.

== Coaching / front-office career ==
DePaul started his coaching career with the Washington Redskins in 1989. He coached with the Washington Redskins and Cincinnati Bengals for eight years before entering the Philadelphia Eagles front office.

He was the Director of Pro Player Personnel for the Chicago Bears from 2001-06-19 to 2010-02-15.
