= Greg Truitt =

American football player (born 1965)

No. 59
- Position: Long snapper

Personal information
- Born: December 8, 1965 (age 60); Sarasota, Florida, U.S.
- Listed height: 6 ft 0 in (1.83 m)
- Listed weight: 235 lb (107 kg)

Career information
- High school: Riverview Sarasota
- College: Penn State
- NFL draft: 1989: undrafted

Career history
- Cincinnati Bengals (1994–1999)

Awards and highlights
- National champion (1986)

Career NFL statistics
- Games played: 75
- Games started: 0
- Stats at Pro Football Reference

Gregory Hoyt Truitt (born December 8, 1965) is an American former professional football player who was a long snapper in the National Football League (NFL). He was signed by the Cincinnati Bengals as an undrafted free agent in 1994. He played college football for the Penn State Nittany Lions.
