= Trent Pollard =

American football player (born 1972)

No. 76
- Positions: Guard, tackle

Personal information
- Born: November 20, 1972 (age 53); Seattle, Washington, U.S.
- Listed height: 6 ft 4 in (1.93 m)
- Listed weight: 330 lb (150 kg)

Career information
- High school: Rainier Beach (Seattle)
- College: Eastern Washington
- NFL draft: 1994: 5th round, 132nd overall pick

Career history
- Cincinnati Bengals (1994–1996); St. Louis Rams (1997)*
- * Offseason or practice squad member only

Career NFL statistics
- Games played: 17
- Stats at Pro Football Reference

Trent Deshawn Pollard (born November 20, 1972) is an American former professional football player who was an offensive lineman for three seasons with the Cincinnati Bengals of the National Football League (NFL). He played college football for the Eastern Washington Eagles before being selected by the Bengals in the fifth round of the 1994 NFL draft.

After his playing career, Pollard became a football coach at his alma mater, Rainier Beach High School in Seattle. He continued to work with students in Seattle Public Schools, as an assistant principal at Cleveland High School. Black History Today: Trent and Ericka Pollard, leading with love Mr Pollard is an assistant principal at Hazen High School.

His wife, Ericka Johnson Pollard, is a former teacher at B. F. Day Elementary School and previously served as an assistant principal at Franklin High School in Seattle. Ms. Pollard is the principal of Tally High School.
