= David Dunn (American football) =

American football player (born 1972)

No. 80, 83, 81, 88
- Positions: Wide receiver, return specialist

Personal information
- Born: June 10, 1972 (age 54); San Diego, California, U.S.
- Listed height: 6 ft 3 in (1.91 m)
- Listed weight: 220 lb (100 kg)

Career information
- High school: Morse (San Diego)
- College: Fresno State
- NFL draft: 1995: 5th round, 139th overall pick

Career history
- Cincinnati Bengals (1995–1998); Pittsburgh Steelers (1998); Cleveland Browns (1999); Oakland Raiders (2000–2001)

Awards and highlights
- WAC Special Teams Player of the Year (1994)

Career NFL statistics
- Receptions: 91
- Receiving yards: 1,264
- Touchdowns: 6
- Stats at Pro Football Reference

David Dunn (born June 10, 1972) is an American former professional football player who was a wide receiver and return specialist in the National Football League (NFL). He was selected by the Cincinnati Bengals in the fifth round of the 1995 NFL draft. He played college football for the Fresno State Bulldogs after transferring from Bakersfield Junior College.

Dunn also played for the Pittsburgh Steelers, Cleveland Browns, and Oakland Raiders.

Dunn is currently the head football coach at Lincoln High School in San Diego, California.

== Early life ==
Dunn attended Samuel F. B. Morse High School in Southeast San Diego, where he played wide receiver and punt returner as a senior.
