= Randy Neal =

American football player (born 1972)

No. 52, 54
- Position: Linebacker

Personal information
- Born: December 29, 1972 (age 53); Hackensack, New Jersey, U.S.
- Listed height: 6 ft 3 in (1.91 m)
- Listed weight: 236 lb (107 kg)

Career information
- High school: Hackensack
- College: Virginia
- NFL draft: 1995: undrafted

Career history
- Cleveland Browns (1995)*; Green Bay Packers (1995)*; Cincinnati Bengals (1995–1996); England Monarchs (1998); San Francisco 49ers (1998); Cleveland Browns (1999)*; Carolina Cobras (2000)
- * Offseason or practice squad member only
- Stats at Pro Football Reference

Randy Neal (born December 29, 1972) is an American former professional football player who was a linebacker in the National Football League (NFL). He played college football for the Virginia Cavaliers. He played in the NFL for the Cincinnati Bengals from 1995 to 1996 and for the San Francisco 49ers in 1998.
