= Dave Shula =

American football player and coach (born 1959)

Personal information
- Born: May 28, 1959 (age 67); Lexington, Kentucky, U.S.
- Listed height: 5 ft 11 in (1.80 m)
- Listed weight: 182 lb (83 kg)

Career information
- Position: Wide receiver (No. 85)
- High school: Chaminade (Hollywood, Florida)
- College: Dartmouth
- NFL draft: 1981: undrafted

Career history

Playing
- Baltimore Colts (1981)

Coaching
- Miami Dolphins (1982–1985) Wide receivers coach; Miami Dolphins (1985–1987) Wide receivers & quarterbacks coach; Miami Dolphins (1988) Quarterbacks coach; Dallas Cowboys (1989–1990) Offensive coordinator & quarterbacks coach; Cincinnati Bengals (1991) Wide receivers coach; Cincinnati Bengals (1992–1996) Head coach; Dartmouth (2018–2023) Wide receivers coach

Awards and highlights
- Second-team All-East (1980)

Head coaching record
- Regular season: 19–52 (.268)
- Coaching profile at Pro Football Reference
- Stats at Pro Football Reference

David Donald Shula (born May 28, 1959) is an American former football coach and player. Shula served as the head coach for the Cincinnati Bengals of the National Football League (NFL) from 1992 to 1996, compiling a record of 19–52. He is the son of Pro Football Hall of Fame coach Don Shula, brother of fellow football coach Mike Shula, and father of football coach Chris Shula.

== Biography ==
The Shula family moved to Detroit in 1960 and Baltimore in 1963, following Don Shula's career in the NFL. The family settled in Miami Lakes, Florida in 1970, where Dave Shula was a high school football and baseball player at Hollywood Chaminade High School. Shula was a star wide receiver at Dartmouth College, where he graduated with a degree in history in 1981.

=== NFL career ===
Shula's career as an NFL player was a brief one-season appearance as a wide receiver and punt returner with the Baltimore Colts in 1981. He began his coaching career with the Miami Dolphins in 1982, under his father as head coach. In 1989, Shula was hired by Jimmy Johnson to be his offensive coordinator for the Dallas Cowboys, a position he held for two seasons. Shula clashed with players due to trust differences and was demoted from that position after the 1990 season, and soon thereafter left the Cowboys to take an assistant coaching position with the Cincinnati Bengals in 1991.

In 1992, Shula was named head coach of the Bengals. At age 32, he was one of the youngest men to achieve such a position with an NFL team. The younger Shula faced off against his father twice, dubbed Shula Bowl I and Shula Bowl II by the media, the first father and son head coaches to face each other in NFL history. Don's Dolphins beat Dave's Bengals in both games, 23–7 in 1994 and 26–23 in 1995. Both games were played in Cincinnati. The younger Shula's stint with the Bengals was unsuccessful and the team was dismal during the 1990s. The team compiled a 19–52 record over Shula's four and a half years at the helm. Infamously, Shula was hired over Kansas City Chiefs defensive coordinator Bill Cowher. Cowher took the head coaching position with the rival Pittsburgh Steelers that same offseason and went on to have a 22–9 career record against the Bengals, the most wins he had against any team as a head coach. This included an 8–1 record against Shula.

The Bengals fired Shula after starting the 1996 season 1–6. Shula lost 50 games faster than any NFL coach in history, in 69 games. Shula surpassed former Tampa Bay Buccaneers head coach John McKay as the fastest coach to 50 losses to begin an NFL coaching career.

After a 22-year absence from coaching, Shula was hired as a wide receivers coach by Dartmouth College on March 29, 2018. He retired from coaching in January 2024, and Dan Hebert was hired as his replacement.

=== Business career ===
After leaving football, Shula joined the family steakhouse business in 1997 and helped expand the franchise internationally. He is an amateur golfer, tennis player and marathon runner. Dave is married and has three sons, Daniel, Chris and Matthew.

== Head coaching record ==
Team	Year	Regular season					Postseason			
Team	Year	Won	Lost	Ties	Win %	Finish	Won	Lost	Win %	Result
CIN	1992	5	11	0	.313	4th in AFC Central	–	–	–	–
CIN	1993	3	13	0	.188	4th in AFC Central	–	–	–	–
CIN	1994	3	13	0	.188	3rd in AFC Central	–	–	–	–
CIN	1995	7	9	0	.438	3rd in AFC Central	–	–	–	–
CIN	1996	1	6	0	.143	3rd in AFC Central	–	–	–	Fired midseason
CIN total		19	52	0	.268		–	–	–	–
Total		19	52	0	.268		–	–	–	–
