= 1984 Cincinnati Bengals season =

NFL team season

- Owner: Paul Brown
- General manager: Paul Brown
- Head coach: Sam Wyche
- Home stadium: Riverfront Stadium

Results
- Record: 8–8
- Division place: 2nd AFC Central
- Playoffs: Did not qualify

The 1984 season was the Cincinnati Bengals' 15th season in the National Football League (NFL), their 17th overall, and their first under head coach Sam Wyche. The team lost their first five games, before winning eight of their final eleven games to finish the season with a .500 record.

The season was the first for head coach Sam Wyche, who had replaced former coach Forrest Gregg after Gregg had resigned following the previous season. Wyche had been the head coach at Indiana University in 1983.

The club stumbled out of the gate, and went winless in September en route to a 1–6 start. However, the team began a turnaround, and by December, was one of the hottest teams in the league. The team won seven out of their last nine games, including a crucial win against their division rival Pittsburgh Steelers in week 11.

In the final week of the season, Cincinnati needed to win, and hope for the Steelers to lose at the Raiders, to secure an improbable AFC Central division title. The Bengals did their part, routing the Bills 52–21, and finished the season 8–8. Later in the day, the Bengals were forced to "scoreboard watch." The Steelers, however, managed to beat the Raiders, clinching the division, and effectively eliminating the Bengals from the playoffs.

In a 2018 article from FiveThirtyEight, the 1984 Cincinnati Bengals team is rated as the most average team in the history of American sports. They both scored and allowed 339 points in addition to their 8–8 record.

== Offseason ==
=== NFL draft ===
1984 Cincinnati Bengals draft
Round	Pick	Player	Position	College	Notes
1	7	Ricky Hunley	LB	Arizona	
1	16	Pete Koch	DE	Maryland	
1	28	Brian Blados	OT	North Carolina	
2	38	Boomer Esiason *	QB	Maryland	
3	65	Stanford Jennings	RB	Furman	
4	92	John Farley	RB	Sacramento State	
5	119	Barney Bussey	DB	South Carolina State	
6	150	Don Kern	TE	Arizona State	
7	177	Leo Barker	LB	New Mexico State	
8	204	Bruce Reimers	Guard	Iowa State	
9	231	Bruce Kozerski	Center	Holy Cross	
10	262	Aaron Jackson	LB	North Carolina	
10	265	Brent Ziegler	RB	Syracuse	
11	289	Steve McKeaver	RB	Central State (OK)	
12	316	Steve Raquet	LB	Holy Cross	
Made roster † Pro Football Hall of Fame * Made at least one Pro Bowl during career

== Personnel ==
=== Staff / Coaches ===
1984 Cincinnati Bengals staff
Front office: Owner/president – John Sawyer; Owner/general manager – Paul Brown; Head coaches: Head coach – Sam Wyche; Offensive coaches: Offensive coordinator/Quarterbacks/Wide Receivers – Bruce Coslet; Running backs – Jim Anderson; Tight ends – Joe Faragalli; Offensive line – Jim McNally	Defensive coaches: Defensive coordinator – Dick LeBeau; Defensive line – Bill Urbanik; Linebackers – Dick Selcer; Defensive Backs - Trent Walters; Strength and conditioning: Strength and Conditioning – Kim Wood

== Roster ==
1984 Cincinnati Bengals roster
Quarterbacks (QB): 14 Ken Anderson; 11 Bryan Clark; 7 Boomer Esiason; Running backs (RB): 40 Charles Alexander; 21 James Brooks; 33 John Farley; 36 Stanford Jennings; 28 Larry Kinnebrew; Wide receivers (WR): 80 Cris Collinsworth; 85 Isaac Curtis; 86 Steve Kreider; 88 Mike Martin; 81 David Verser; 84 Gary Williams; Tight ends (TE): 83 M. L. Harris; 82 Rodney Holman; 89 Don Kern	Offensive linemen (OL): 75 Brian Blados T; 64 Bruce Kozerski G/C; 65 Max Montoya G; 78 Anthony Muñoz T; 64 Bruce Reimers T/G; 50 Dave Rimington C; 62 Gary Smith G; 77 Mike Wilson T; Defensive linemen (DL): 61 Jerry Boyarsky NT; 79 Ross Browner DE; 76 Glen Collins DE; 73 Eddie Edwards DE; 67 Pete Koch DE; 69 Tim Krumrie NT	Linebackers (LB): 53 Leo Barker OLB; 50 Glenn Cameron ILB; 49 Guy Frazier OLB; 47 Steve Maidlow ILB; 51 Rick Razzano ILB; 59 Jeff Schuh OLB; 56 Ron Simpkins ILB; 57 Reggie Williams OLB; Defensive backs (DB): 34 Louis Breeden CB; 22 James Griffin FS; 44 Ray Griffin CB; 20 Ray Horton CB; 37 Robert Jackson FS; 26 Bobby Kemp SS; 25 John Simmons CB; 35 Jimmy Turner SS; Special teams (ST): 3 Jim Breech K; 87 Pat McInally P	Reserve: 27 Bryan Hicks S (IR); 68 Mike Obrovac T (IR); 42 Clay Pickering WR (IR); 58 Brian Pillman LB (IR); 15 Turk Schonert QB (IR); 32 Stanley Wilson RB (IR); Rookies in italics

== Preseason ==
Week	Date	Opponent	Result	Record	Venue	Attendance
1	August 4	at New York Jets	W 21–15	1–0	Giants Stadium	25,055
2	August 11	at Tampa Bay Buccaneers	L 13–21	1–1	Tampa Stadium	33,588
3	August 18	at Chicago Bears	W 25–17	2–1	Soldier Field	53,194
4	August 24	Detroit Lions	W 35–14	3–1	Riverfront Stadium	41,715

== Regular season ==
=== Schedule ===
Week	Date	Opponent	Result	Record	Venue	Attendance	Recap
1	September 2	at Denver Broncos	**L** 17–20	0–1	Mile High Stadium	74,178	Recap
2	September 9	Kansas City Chiefs	**L** 22–27	0–2	Riverfront Stadium	47,111	Recap
3	September 16	at New York Jets	**L** 23–43	0–3	Giants Stadium	64,193	Recap
4	September 23	Los Angeles Rams	**L** 14–24	0–4	Riverfront Stadium	45,406	Recap
5	October 1	at **Pittsburgh Steelers**	**L** 17–38	0–5	Three Rivers Stadium	57,098	Recap
6	October 7	**Houston Oilers**	**W** 13–3	1–5	Riverfront Stadium	43,637	Recap
7	October 14	at New England Patriots	**L** 14–20	1–6	Sullivan Stadium	48,154	Recap
8	October 21	**Cleveland Browns**	**W** 12–9	2–6	Riverfront Stadium	50,667	Recap
9	October 28	at **Houston Oilers**	**W** 31–13	3–6	Houston Astrodome	34,010	Recap
10	November 4	at San Francisco 49ers	**L** 17–23	3–7	Candlestick Park	58,324	Recap
11	November 11	**Pittsburgh Steelers**	**W** 22–20	4–7	Riverfront Stadium	52,497	Recap
12	November 18	Seattle Seahawks	**L** 6–26	4–8	Riverfront Stadium	50,280	Recap
13	November 25	Atlanta Falcons	**W** 35–14	5–8	Riverfront Stadium	44,678	Recap
14	December 2	at **Cleveland Browns**	**W** 20–17	6–8	Cleveland Municipal Stadium	51,774	Recap
15	December 9	at New Orleans Saints	**W** 24–21	7–8	Louisiana Superdome	40,855	Recap
16	December 16	Buffalo Bills	**W** 52–21	8–8	Riverfront Stadium	55,771	Recap
Note: Intra-division opponents are in **bold** text.

=== Game summaries ===
==== Week 6 ====
Team	1	2	3	4	Total
Oilers	0	0	3	0	3
• Bengals	0	3	7	3	13

- Date: October 7
- Location: Riverfront Stadium, Cincinnati
- Game start: 4:00 p.m.
- Game weather: 63 °F (17 °C); wind 8 mph (13 km/h)
- Referee: Jim Tunney

Scoring summary
Q2	CIN	Breech 33 yard field goal	CIN 3–0
Q3	HOU	Kempf 24 yard field goal	Tie 3–3
Q3	CIN	Esiason 3 yard run (Breech kick)	CIN 10–3
Q4	CIN	Breech 22 yard field goal	CIN 13–3

==== Week 8 ====
Team	1	2	3	4	Total
Browns	3	3	0	3	9
• Bengals	3	3	0	6	12

- Date: October 21
- Location: Riverfront Stadium, Cincinnati
- Game start: 1:00 p.m.
- Game weather: 63 °F (17 °C); wind 12 mph (19 km/h)
- Referee: Fred Wyant

Scoring summary
Q1	CIN	Breech 24 yard field goal	CIN 3–0
Q1	CLE	Bahr 50 yard field goal	Tie 3–3
Q2	CIN	Breech 23 yard field goal	CIN 6–3
Q2	CLE	Cox 60 yard field goal	Tie 6–6
Q4	CIN	Breech 25 yard field goal	CIN 9–6
Q4	CLE	Bahr 47 yard field goal	Tie 9–9
Q4	CIN	Breech 33 yard field goal	CIN 12–9

==== Week 10 (Sunday, November 4, 1984): at San Francisco 49ers ====
Week 10: Cincinnati Bengals at San Francisco 49ers

Quarter	1	2	3	4	Total
Bengals (3–7)	3	14	0	0	**17**
49ers (9–1)	0	7	3	13	**23**

at Candlestick Park • San Francisco, California

- Date: November 4, 1984
- Game time: 4:00 p.m. EST
- Game weather: 56 °F (13 °C); wind 14 miles per hour (23 km/h; 12 kn)
- Game attendance: 58,234
- Referee: Dick Jorgensen
- TV announcers (NBC): Len Berman (play-by-play) and Gene Washington (color commentator)

Team	Category	Player	Statistics
CIN	Passing	Ken Anderson	21/34, 269 YDS, 1 TD, 2 INTs
CIN	Rushing	Charles Alexander	8 CAR, 48 YDS
CIN	Receiving	Cris Collinsworth	4 REC, 71 YDS, 1 TD
SF	Passing	Joe Montana	27/42, 301 YDS, 2 TDs, 4 INTs
SF	Rushing	Wendell Tyler	14 CAR, 52 YDS
SF	Receiving	Dwight Clark	7 REC, 124 YDS

Scoring summary

Quarter	Time	Drive			Team	Scoring information	Score	
Quarter	Time	Plays	Yards	TOP	Team	Scoring information	CIN	SF
1	1:05				Bengals	39-yard field goal by Breech	3	0
2	12:07				49ers	Cooper 12-yard touchdown reception from Montana, Wersching kick good	3	7
2	7:02				Bengals	Kinnebrew 6-yard touchdown run, Breech kick good	10	7
2	3:10				Bengals	Collinsworth 7-yard touchdown reception from Anderson, Breech kick good	17	7
3	8:54				49ers	29-yard field goal by Wersching	17	10
4	9:46				49ers	35-yard field goal by Wersching	17	13
4	5:44				49ers	24-yard field goal by Wersching	17	16
4	1:39				49ers	Solomon 4-yard touchdown reception from Montana, Wersching kick good	17	23
"TOP" = time of possession. For other American football terms, see Glossary of American football.							17	23

- Point spread: 49ers by 10½
- Over/under: 43.0 **(under)**
- Time of game:

Bengals	Game statistics	49ers
21	First downs	26
25–116	Rushes–yards	31–91
269	Passing yards	301
21–34–2	Passes	27–42–4
6–39	Sacked–yards	1–7
230	Net passing yards	294
346	Total yards	385
144	Return yards	190
6–38.2	Punts	2–47.0
0–0	Fumbles–lost	0–0
6–46	Penalties–yards	5–30
29:24	Time of Possession	30:36

==== Week 11 ====
Team	1	2	3	4	Total
Steelers	0	13	0	7	20
• Bengals	3	0	12	7	22

- Date: November 11
- Location: Riverfront Stadium, Cincinnati
- Game start: 1:00 p.m.
- Game attendance: 52,497
- Game weather: 43 °F (6 °C); wind 17 mph (27 km/h)
- Referee: Ben Dreith

Scoring summary
Q1	CIN	Jim Breech 21 yard field goal	CIN 3–0
Q2	PIT	Gary Anderson 47 yard field goal	Tie 3–3
Q2	PIT	Mark Malone 1 yard run (Gary Anderson kick)	PIT 10–3
Q2	PIT	Gary Anderson 21 yard field goal	PIT 13–3
Q3	CIN	James Brooks 24 yard run (kick failed)	PIT 13–9
Q3	CIN	Jim Breech 42 yard field goal	PIT 13–12
Q3	CIN	Jim Breech 28 yard field goal	CIN 15–13
Q4	PIT	Louis Lipps 36 yard run (Gary Anderson kick)	PIT 20–15
Q4	CIN	Larry Kinnebrew 3 yard run (Jim Breech kick)	CIN 22–20

External videos
- 1984 Steelers at Bengals - full broadcast

=== Standings ===
AFC Central
	W	L	T	PCT	DIV	CONF	PF	PA	STK
^{(3)} Pittsburgh Steelers	9	7	0	.563	3–3	6–6	387	310	W2
Cincinnati Bengals	8	8	0	.500	5–1	6–6	339	339	W4
Cleveland Browns	5	11	0	.313	3–3	4–8	250	297	W1
Houston Oilers	3	13	0	.188	1–5	3–9	240	437	L2
