= 1981 Cincinnati Bengals season =

NFL team season

- Owner: Paul Brown
- General manager: Paul Brown
- Head coach: Forrest Gregg
- Offensive coordinator: Lindy Infante
- Defensive coordinator: Hank Bullough
- Home stadium: Riverfront Stadium

Results
- Record: 12–4
- Division place: 1st AFC Central
- Playoffs: Won Divisional Playoffs (vs. Bills) 28–21; Won AFC Championship (vs. Chargers) 27–7; Lost Super Bowl XVI (vs. 49ers) 21–26

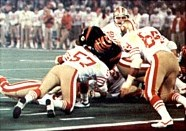
The Bengals playing against the 49ers in Super Bowl XVI.

The 1981 Cincinnati Bengals season was the franchise's 12th season in the National Football League (NFL), and the 14th overall. The team won their first AFC Championship, but lost Super Bowl XVI to San Francisco.

Cincinnati had at least a share of the AFC Central lead the entire season. On December 13, quarterback Ken Anderson threw two touchdown passes as the Bengals clinched the division with a 17–10 win over the Pittsburgh Steelers, the Bengals' only other rival for the division title by that point in the season.

Ken Anderson led the NFL in passing in 1981 with a 98.5 rating.

On January 3, 1982, the Bengals beat Buffalo, 28–21, in an AFC divisional playoff game. A week later, playing in their first AFC Championship Game in brutally cold weather, the Bengals defeated San Diego 27–7 at Riverfront Stadium. In a temperature of −9 °F (−23 °C) with a wind-chill factor of −59 °F (−51 °C), this game is referred to as the Freezer Bowl.

In Super Bowl XVI on January 24, 1982, in Pontiac, Michigan, the Bengals trailed 20–0 at halftime and lost to San Francisco, 26–21.

== Offseason ==
Before the season, the Bengals unveiled new uniforms with tiger-striped helmets, jerseys and pants.

=== NFL draft ===
1981 Cincinnati Bengals draft
Round	Pick	Player	Position	College	Notes
1	10	David Verser	Wide receiver	Kansas	
2	37	Cris Collinsworth *	Wide receiver	Florida	
3	64	John Simmons	Defensive back	SMU	
4	93	Guy Frazier	Linebacker	Wyoming	
5	120	Benjie Pryor	Tight end	Pittsburgh	
6	146	Rex Robinson	Placekicker	Georgia	
7	176	Jeff Schuh	Linebacker	Minnesota	
8	202	Bobby Kemp	Defensive back	Cal State Fullerton	
9	229	Jim Hannula	Offensive tackle	Northern Illinois	
9	230	Samoa Samoa	Running back	Washington State	
10	258	Hubert Simpson	Running back	Tennessee	
11	285	Robert Jackson	Defensive back	Central Michigan	
12	312	Mark O'Connell	Quarterback	Ball State	
Made roster * Made at least one Pro Bowl during career

=== Undrafted free agents ===
1981 undrafted free agents of note
Player	Position	College
Ken Brown	Wide receiver	Nebraska
Jim Destefano	Linebacker	Cornell
Dennis Dunn	Safety	Yale

== Personnel ==
=== Staff / Coaches ===
1981 Cincinnati Bengals staff
Front office: Owner/General Manager – Paul Brown; President – John Sawyer; Director of Player Personnel – Pete Brown; Head coaches: Head Coach – Forrest Gregg; Offensive coaches: Offensive Coordinator/Quarterbacks/Receivers – Lindy Infante; Offensive Backfield – George Sefcik; Tight Ends – Bruce Coslet; Offensive Line – Jim McNally	Defensive coaches: Defensive Coordinator/Linebackers – Hank Bullough; Defensive Line – Dick Modzelewski; Defensive Backfield – Dick LeBeau; Special teams coaches: Special Teams – Bruce Coslet; Strength and conditioning: Strength – Kim Wood

=== Roster ===
1981 Cincinnati Bengals roster
Quarterbacks (QB): 14 Ken Anderson; 15 Turk Schonert; 12 Jack Thompson; Running backs (RB): 40 Charles Alexander; 45 Archie Griffin; 36 Jimmy Hargrove; 46 Pete Johnson; Wide receivers (WR): 84 Don Bass; 80 Cris Collinsworth; 85 Isaac Curtis; 86 Steve Kreider; 87 Pat McInally P; 81 David Verser; Tight ends (TE): 83 M. L. Harris; 89 Dan Ross	Offensive linemen (OL): 58 Blair Bush C; 62 Dave Lapham G; 65 Max Montoya G; 60 Blake Moore C; 78 Anthony Muñoz T; 68 Mike Obrovac G/T; 77 Mike Wilson T; Defensive linemen (DL): 79 Ross Browner DE; 67 Gary Burley DE; 73 Eddie Edwards DE; 71 Rod Horn NT; 72 Mike St. Clair DE; 75 Wilson Whitley DT	Linebackers (LB): 50 Glenn Cameron ILB; 52 Tom Dinkel OLB; 49 Guy Frazier OLB; 53 Bo Harris OLB; 55 Jim LeClair ILB; 51 Rick Razzano ILB; 59 Jeff Schuh OLB; 57 Reggie Williams OLB; Defensive backs (DB): 34 Louis Breeden CB; 21 Oliver Davis SS; 42 Mike Fuller FS; 44 Ray Griffin FS; 27 Bryan Hicks FS; 26 Bobby Kemp SS; 13 Ken Riley CB; 25 John Simmons CB; Special teams (ST): 10 Jim Breech K	Practice squad: None - Vacant; Reserve: 74 Glenn Bujnoch G (IR); 66 Jim Hannula T (IR); 37 Robert Jackson S (IR); 30 Dick Jauron S (IR); 29 Samoa Samoa RB (IR); 56 Ron Simpkins LB (IR); Rookies in italics 45 active, 6 reserve, 0 practice squad

== Regular season ==
=== Schedule ===
Week	Date	Opponent	Result	Record	Venue	Attendance
1	September 6	Seattle Seahawks	**W** 27–21	1–0	Riverfront Stadium	41,177
2	September 13	at New York Jets	**W** 31–30	2–0	Shea Stadium	49,454
3	September 20	**Cleveland Browns**	**L** 17–20	2–1	Riverfront Stadium	52,170
4	September 27	Buffalo Bills	**W** 27–24	3–1	Riverfront Stadium	46,418
5	October 4	at **Houston Oilers**	**L** 10–17	3–2	Astrodome	44,350
6	October 11	at Baltimore Colts	**W** 41–19	4–2	Memorial Stadium	33,060
7	October 18	**Pittsburgh Steelers**	**W** 34–7	5–2	Riverfront Stadium	57,090
8	October 25	at New Orleans Saints	**L** 7–17	5–3	Louisiana Superdome	46,336
9	November 1	**Houston Oilers**	**W** 34–21	6–3	Riverfront Stadium	54,736
10	November 8	at San Diego Chargers	**W** 40–17	7–3	Jack Murphy Stadium	51,259
11	November 15	Los Angeles Rams	**W** 24–10	8–3	Riverfront Stadium	56,836
12	November 22	Denver Broncos	**W** 38–21	9–3	Riverfront Stadium	57,207
13	November 29	at **Cleveland Browns**	**W** 41–21	10–3	Cleveland Stadium	75,186
14	December 6	San Francisco 49ers	**L** 3–21	10–4	Riverfront Stadium	56,796
15	December 13	at **Pittsburgh Steelers**	**W** 17–10	11–4	Three Rivers Stadium	50,623
16	December 20	at Atlanta Falcons	**W** 30–28	12–4	Fulton County Stadium	35,972
Note: Intra-division opponents are in **bold** text.

=== Game summaries ===
==== Week 1 ====
Team	1	2	3	4	Total
Seahawks	21	0	0	0	21
• Bengals	0	10	10	7	27

- Date: September 6
- Location: Riverfront Stadium, Cincinnati
- Game start: 1:00 p.m.
- Game attendance: 41,177
- Game weather: 69 °F (21 °C); wind 8 mph (13 km/h)
- Referee: Bob Frederic
- Television network: NBC

Scoring summary
Q1	SEA	Harris 29 yard interception return (Herrera kick)	SEA 7–0
Q1	SEA	Largent 36 yard pass from Zorn (Herrera kick)	SEA 14–0
Q1	SEA	Jodat 1 yard run (Herrera kick)	SEA 21–0
Q2	CIN	Breech 25 yard field goal	SEA 21–3
Q2	CIN	Johnson 3 yard run (Breech kick)	SEA 21–10
Q3	CIN	Breech 40 yard field goal	SEA 21–13
Q3	CIN	Griffin 3 yard run (Breech kick)	SEA 21–20
Q4	CIN	Johnson 2 yard run (Breech kick)	CIN 27–21

==== Week 2 ====
Team	1	2	3	4	Total
• Bengals	0	10	7	14	31
Jets	0	17	3	10	30

- Date: September 13
- Location: Shea Stadium
- Referee: Jerry Seeman
- Television network: NBC

==== Week 3 ====
Team	1	2	3	4	Total
• Browns	3	10	0	7	20
Bengals	0	0	3	14	17

- Date: September 20
- Location: Riverfront Stadium
- Referee: Red Cashion
- Television network: NBC

==== Week 4 ====
Team	1	2	3	4	OT	Total
Bills	0	14	0	10	0	24
• Bengals	0	10	0	14	3	27

- Date: September 27
- Location: Riverfront Stadium

==== Week 5 ====
Team	1	2	3	4	Total
Bengals	3	0	7	0	10
• Oilers	0	7	7	3	17

- Date: October 4
- Location: Astrodome
- Game weather: Indoors (dome)

==== Week 6 ====
Team	1	2	3	4	Total
• Bengals	3	14	7	17	41
Colts	0	5	0	14	19

- Date: October 11
- Location: Memorial Stadium
- Referee: Fred Wyant

==== Week 7 ====
Team	1	2	3	4	Total
Steelers	0	0	0	7	7
• Bengals	10	3	14	7	34

- Date: October 18
- Location: Riverfront Stadium
- Referee: Jerry Markbreit
- TV announcers (NBC): Don Criqui and John Brodie

==== Week 8 ====
Team	1	2	3	4	Total
Bengals	0	0	0	7	7
• Saints	0	0	7	10	17

- Date: October 25
- Location: Louisiana Superdome
- Game weather: Indoors (dome)
- Referee: Tom Dooley

==== Week 9 ====
Team	1	2	3	4	Total
Oilers	7	0	0	14	21
• Bengals	0	24	3	7	34

- Date: November 1
- Location: Riverfront Stadium

==== Week 10 ====
Team	1	2	3	4	Total
• Bengals	10	21	0	9	40
Chargers	0	10	0	7	17

- Date: November 8
- Location: Jack Murphy Stadium
- Referee: Fred Silva

==== Week 11 ====
Team	1	2	3	4	Total
Rams	0	3	0	7	10
• Bengals	10	0	0	14	24

- Date: November 15
- Location: Riverfront Stadium
- Referee: Bob McElwee
- TV announcers (CBS): Vin Scully and Hank Stram

==== Week 12 ====
Team	1	2	3	4	Total
Broncos	0	7	0	14	21
• Bengals	14	14	0	10	38

- Date: November 22
- Location: Riverfront Stadium
- Referee: Jerry Markbreit

==== Week 13 ====
Team	1	2	3	4	Total
• Bengals	14	14	0	13	41
Browns	0	7	0	14	21

- Date: November 29
- Location: Cleveland Municipal Stadium
- Game start: 12:00 p.m. CST
- Game weather: 36 °F (2 °C); wind 10 mph (16 km/h)
- Referee: Jim Tunney
- TV announcers (NBC): Bob Costas and Bob Trumpy

Scoring summary
Q1	CIN	Johnson 5 yard pass from Anderson (Breech kick)	CIN 7–0
Q1	CIN	Collinsworth 39 yard pass from Anderson (Breech kick)	CIN 14–0
Q2	CIN	Collinsworth 7 yard pass from Anderson (Breech kick)	CIN 21–0
Q2	CLE	Feacher 30 yard pass from Sipe (Bahr kick)	CIN 21–7
Q2	CIN	Harris 2 yard pass from Anderson (Breech kick)	CIN 28–7
Q4	CLE	Pruitt 1 yard run (Bahr kick)	CIN 28–14
Q4	CIN	Johnson 11 yard run (Breech kick)	CIN 35–14
Q4	CIN	Johnson 1 yard run (Breech kick)	CIN 42–14
Q4	CLE	Pruitt 7 yard pass from McDonald (Bahr kick)	CIN 42–21

- Pete Johnson 21 Rush, 105 Yds

==== Week 14 ====
Team	1	2	3	4	Total
• 49ers	7	7	0	7	21
Bengals	0	3	0	0	3

- Date: December 6
- Location: Riverfront Stadium
- Referee: Jerry Seeman
- TV announcers (CBS): Tim Ryan and Fred Dryer

==== Week 15 ====
Team	1	2	3	4	Total
• Bengals	0	10	7	0	17
Steelers	0	3	0	7	10

- Date: December 13
- Location: Three Rivers Stadium
- Referee: Red Cashion
- TV announcers (NBC): Don Criqui and John Brodie

==== Week 16 ====
Team	1	2	3	4	Total
• Bengals	10	17	0	3	30
Falcons	0	21	0	7	28

- Date: December 20
- Location: Atlanta-Fulton County Stadium
- Referee: Fred Wyant
- Television network: NBC

=== Playoffs ===
Round	Date	Opponent	Result	Record	Venue	Attendance
Divisional	January 3, 1982	Buffalo Bills	**W** 28–21	1–0	Riverfront Stadium	55,420
AFC Championship	January 10, 1982	San Diego Chargers	**W** 27–7	2–0	Riverfront Stadium	46,302
Super Bowl XVI	January 24, 1982	San Francisco 49ers	**L** 21–26	2–1	Pontiac Silverdome	81,270

==== Divisional ====
Team	1	2	3	4	Total
Bills	0	7	7	7	21
• Bengals	14	0	7	7	28

- Date: January 3
- Location: Riverfront Stadium
- Referee: Pat Haggerty
- TV announcers (NBC): Dick Enberg and Merlin Olsen

==== Conference Championship ====
Team	1	2	3	4	Total
Chargers	0	7	0	0	7
• Bengals	10	7	3	7	27

- Date: January 10
- Location: Riverfront Stadium
- Referee: Fred Silva
- TV announcers (NBC): Dick Enberg and Merlin Olsen

==== Super Bowl ====
Team	1	2	3	4	Total
• 49ers	7	13	0	6	26
Bengals	0	0	7	14	21

- Date: January 24
- Location: Pontiac Silverdome
- Game weather: Indoors (dome)
- Referee: Pat Haggerty
- TV announcers (CBS): Pat Summerall and John Madden

=== Standings ===
AFC Central
	W	L	T	PCT	DIV	CONF	PF	PA	STK
^{(1)} Cincinnati Bengals	12	4	0	.750	4–2	10–2	421	304	W2
Pittsburgh Steelers	8	8	0	.500	3–3	5–7	356	297	L3
Houston Oilers	7	9	0	.438	4–2	6–6	281	355	W1
Cleveland Browns	5	11	0	.313	1–5	2–10	276	375	L5

== Awards and records ==
- Ken Anderson, NFL MVP
- Ken Anderson, Bert Bell Award
- Ken Anderson, Franchise Record (since broken), Touchdown Passes, 29 Passes
- Ken Anderson, Led NFL, Passer Rating, 98.4 Rating

=== Milestones ===
- Ken Anderson, Franchise Record (since broken), Most Touchdown Passes in One Season, 29 Passes
- Cris Collinsworth, 1st 1,000 Yard Receiving Season (1,009 yards)
- Pete Johnson, 1,000 Yard Rushing Season (1,077 yards)
