= 1982 Cincinnati Bengals season =

NFL team season

- General manager: Paul Brown
- Head coach: Forrest Gregg
- Offensive coordinator: Lindy Infante
- Defensive coordinator: Hank Bullough
- Home stadium: Riverfront Stadium

Results
- Record: 7–2
- Division place: 3rd AFC (1st AFC Central)
- Playoffs: Lost Wild Card Playoffs (vs. Jets) 17–44

The 1982 Cincinnati Bengals season was the team's 13th season in the National Football League, their 15th overall and their third under head coach Forrest Gregg. It was the first year in which the Bengals made the playoffs for a second-consecutive season, and they would not do so again until 2012.

The Bengals posted a 7–2 record in a strike-shortened season to earn a postseason berth but lost to the Jets in the first round of the playoffs, 44–17. This was the only playoff loss by the Bengals at Riverfront Stadium. Ken Anderson led the AFC in passing for the fourth time as the Bengals boasted the second-best offense in the NFL. Perhaps the best moment of the season for the Bengals was defeating the Raiders 31–17. The loss by the Raiders was their only loss of the season. The Bengals went 4–0 at home in 1982.

The last remaining active member of the 1982 Cincinnati Bengals was tight end Rodney Holman, who retired after the 1995 season.

== Offseason ==
=== NFL draft ===
1982 Cincinnati Bengals draft
Round	Pick	Player	Position	College	Notes
1	26	Glen Collins	Defensive end	Mississippi State	
2	54	Emanuel Weaver	Defensive tackle	South Carolina	
3	82	Rodney Holman *	Tight end	Tulane	
4	110	Rodney Tate	Running back	Texas	
5	138	Paul Sorensen	Defensive back	Washington State	
6	166	Arthur King	Defensive tackle	Grambling State	
7	194	Ben Needham	Linebacker	Michigan	
8	222	Kari Yli-Renko	Offensive tackle	Cincinnati	
9	250	James Bennett	Wide receiver	Northwestern State	
10	278	Larry Hogue	Defensive back	Utah State	
11	305	Russell Davis	Running back	Idaho	
12	333	Dan Feraday	Quarterback	Toronto	
Made roster * Made at least one Pro Bowl during career

=== Undrafted free agents ===
1982 undrafted free agents of note
Player	Position	College
Ron Hausauer	Guard	Jamestown

== Personnel ==
=== Staff ===
1982 Cincinnati Bengals staff
Front office: President – John Sawyer; General manager – Paul Brown; Director of player personnel – Pete Brown; Head coaches: Head coach – Forrest Gregg; Offensive coaches: Offensive Coordinator – Lindy Infante; Offensive Backfield – George Sefcik; Tight Ends – Bruce Coslet; Offensive Line – Jim McNally	Defensive coaches: Defensive Coordinator/Linebackers – Hank Bullough; Defensive Line – Dick Modzelewski; Defensive Backfield – Dick LeBeau; Special teams coaches: Special Teams – Bruce Coslet; Strength and conditioning: Strength – Kim Wood

=== Roster ===
1982 Cincinnati Bengals roster
Quarterbacks (QB): 14 Ken Anderson; 15 Turk Schonert; Running backs (RB): 40 Charles Alexander; 45 Archie Griffin; 46 Pete Johnson; 23 Rodney Tate; Wide receivers (WR): 80 Cris Collinsworth; 85 Isaac Curtis; 86 Steve Kreider; 81 David Verser; Tight ends (TE): 83 M. L. Harris; 82 Rodney Holman; 89 Dan Ross	Offensive linemen (OL): 74 Glenn Bujnoch G; 58 Blair Bush C; 62 Dave Lapham G; 65 Max Montoya G; 60 Blake Moore C; 78 Anthony Muñoz T; 68 Mike Obrovac T/G; 63 Ray Wagner T; 77 Mike Wilson T; Defensive linemen (DL): 61 Jerry Boyarsky NT; 79 Ross Browner DE; 76 Glen Collins DE; 73 Eddie Edwards DE; 72 Mike St. Clair DE; 70 Emanuel Weaver NT; 75 Wilson Whitley NT	Linebackers (LB): 50 Glenn Cameron ILB; 52 Tom Dinkel OLB; 49 Guy Frazier OLB; 53 Bo Harris OLB; 55 Jim LeClair ILB; 51 Rick Razzano ILB; 59 Jeff Schuh OLB; 56 Ron Simpkins ILB; 57 Reggie Williams OLB; Defensive backs (DB): 34 Louis Breeden CB; 21 Oliver Davis SS; 42 Mike Fuller FS; 44 Ray Griffin CB; 27 Bryan Hicks FS; 37 Robert Jackson FS; 26 Bobby Kemp SS; 13 Ken Riley CB; 25 John Simmons CB; Special teams (ST): 10 Jim Breech K; 87 Pat McInally P	Reserve: 67 Gary Burley DE (IR); 66 Jim Hannula T (IR); 71 Arthur King NT (IR); 48 Jeff Roberts LB (NF-Inj.); 12 Jack Thompson QB (IR); Rookies in italics

== Regular season ==
=== Schedule ===
Week	Date	Opponent	Result	Record	Venue	Attendance
1	September 12	**Houston Oilers**	**W** 27–6	1–0	Riverfront Stadium	52,268
2	September 19	at **Pittsburgh Steelers**	**L** 20–26	1–1	Three Rivers Stadium	53,973
Players' strike
3	November 21	at Philadelphia Eagles	**W** 18–14	2–1	Veterans Stadium	65,172
4	November 28	Los Angeles Raiders	**W** 31–17	3–1	Riverfront Stadium	53,330
5	December 5	at Baltimore Colts	**W** 20–17	4–1	Memorial Stadium	23,598
6	December 12	**Cleveland Browns**	**W** 23–10	5–1	Riverfront Stadium	54,305
7	December 20	at San Diego Chargers	**L** 34–50	5–2	Jack Murphy Stadium	51,296
8	December 26	Seattle Seahawks	**W** 24–10	6–2	Riverfront Stadium	55,330
9	January 2, 1983	at **Houston Oilers**	**W** 35–27	7–2	Astrodome	26,522
Note: Intra-division opponents are in **bold** text.

=== Standings ===
AFC Central
	W	L	T	PCT	DIV	CONF	PF	PA	STK
^{(3)} Cincinnati Bengals	7	2	0	.778	3–1	6–2	232	177	W2
^{(4)} Pittsburgh Steelers	6	3	0	.667	3–1	5–3	204	146	W2
^{(8)} Cleveland Browns	4	5	0	.444	2–2	4–3	140	182	L1
Houston Oilers	1	8	0	.111	0–4	1–5	136	245	L7

AFC
#	Team	W	L	T	PCT	PF	PA	STK
**Seeded postseason qualifiers**
1	Los Angeles Raiders	8	1	0	.889	260	200	W5
2 (Note: Miami finished ahead of Cincinnati based on better conference record (6–1 to Cincinnati’s 6–2).)	Miami Dolphins	7	2	0	.778	198	131	W3
3	Cincinnati Bengals	7	2	0	.778	232	177	W2
4 (Note: Pittsburgh finished ahead of San Diego based on better record against common opponents (3–1 to Chargers' 2–1). Conference tiebreak was initially used to eliminate New York Jets.) (Note: Pittsburgh and San Diego finished ahead of New York Jets based on conference record (Pittsburgh and San Diego 5–3 against Jets’ 2–3))	Pittsburgh Steelers	6	3	0	.667	204	146	W2
5	San Diego Chargers	6	3	0	.667	288	221	L1
6	New York Jets	6	3	0	.667	245	166	L1
7	New England Patriots	5	4	0	.556	143	157	W1
8 (Note: Cleveland finished ahead of Buffalo and Buffalo ahead of Seattle based on conference record (4–3 to Buffalo’s 3–3 to Seattle’s 3–5).)	Cleveland Browns	4	5	0	.444	140	182	L1
**Did not qualify for the postseason**
9	Buffalo Bills	4	5	0	.444	150	154	L3
10	Seattle Seahawks	4	5	0	.444	127	147	W1
11	Kansas City Chiefs	3	6	0	.333	176	184	W1
12	Denver Broncos	2	7	0	.222	148	226	L3
13	Houston Oilers	1	8	0	.111	136	245	L7
14	Baltimore Colts	0	8	1	.056	113	236	L2
**Tiebreakers**

== Playoffs ==
Round	Date	Opponent	Result	Record	Venue	Attendance
Wild Card	January 9, 1983	New York Jets (6)	L 17–44	0–1	Riverfront Stadium	57,560
