= 1983 Cincinnati Bengals season =

NFL team season

- General manager: Paul Brown
- Head coach: Forrest Gregg
- Home stadium: Riverfront Stadium

Results
- Record: 7–9
- Division place: 3rd AFC Central
- Playoffs: Did not qualify

The 1983 season was the Cincinnati Bengals' 14th season in the National Football League, their 16th overall, and their fourth and final under head coach Forrest Gregg.

Cincinnati lost six of their first seven games, then won six of nine to finish at 7–9. Despite the record, the Bengals claimed the top overall defense in the NFL, and were 4–2 in divisional games.

After the season in December, Gregg was allowed out of his contract's remaining year to succeed Bart Starr as head coach of the Green Bay Packers. Several days later, Indiana Hoosiers head coach Sam Wyche, a former Bengals quarterback, was named as his replacement.

== Offseason ==
=== NFL draft ===
1983 Cincinnati Bengals draft
Round	Pick	Player	Position	College	Notes
1	25	Dave Rimington	Center	Nebraska	
2	53	Ray Horton	Cornerback	Washington	
3	81	Jimmy Turner	Defensive back	UCLA	
4	109	Steve Maidlow	Linebacker	Michigan State	
5	137	Jeff Christensen	Quarterback	Eastern Illinois	
6	152	Kiki DeAyala	Linebacker	Texas	
6	165	Larry Kinnebrew	Running back	Tennessee State	
7	193	James Griffin	Defensive back	Middle Tennessee	
8	221	Mike Martin	Wide receiver	Illinois	
9	248	Stanley Wilson	Running back	Oklahoma	
10	276	Tim Krumrie *	Defensive tackle	Wisconsin	
11	304	Gary Williams	Wide receiver	Ohio State	
12	332	Andre Young	Linebacker	Bowling Green	
Made roster * Made at least one Pro Bowl during career

== Personnel ==
=== Staff ===
1983 Cincinnati Bengals staff
Front office: President – John Sawyer; General Manager – Paul Brown; Director of Player Personnel – Pete Brown; Head coaches: Head Coach – Forrest Gregg; Offensive coaches: Quarterbacks/Receivers – Bruce Coslet; Offensive Backfield – George Sefcik; Offensive Line – Jim McNally	Defensive coaches: Defensive Coordinator/Linebackers – Hank Bullough; Defensive Line – Dick Modzelewski; Defensive Backfield – Dick LeBeau; Strength and conditioning: Strength – Kim Wood

=== Roster ===
1983 Cincinnati Bengals roster
Quarterbacks (QB): 14 Ken Anderson; 11 Jeff Christensen; 15 Turk Schonert; Running backs (RB): 40 Charles Alexander; 46 Pete Johnson; 28 Larry Kinnebrew; 23 Rodney Tate; 32 Stanley Wilson; Wide receivers (WR): 80 Cris Collinsworth; 85 Isaac Curtis; 86 Steve Kreider; 81 David Verser; Tight ends (TE): 48 Andy Gibler; 82 Rodney Holman; 89 Dan Ross	Offensive linemen (OL): 66 Jim Hannula T/G; 62 Dave Lapham G; 65 Max Montoya G; 60 Blake Moore C; 78 Anthony Muñoz T; 68 Mike Obrovac T; 50 Dave Rimington C; 77 Mike Wilson T; Defensive linemen (DL): 61 Jerry Boyarsky NT; 79 Ross Browner DE; 67 Gary Burley DE; 76 Glen Collins DE; 73 Eddie Edwards DE; 69 Tim Krumrie NT	Linebackers (LB): 50 Glenn Cameron ILB; 52 Tom Dinkel OLB; 49 Guy Frazier OLB; 55 Jim LeClair ILB; 47 Steve Maidlow ILB; 51 Rick Razzano ILB; 59 Jeff Schuh OLB; 56 Ron Simpkins ILB; 57 Reggie Williams OLB; Defensive backs (DB): 34 Louis Breeden CB; 22 James Griffin FS; 44 Ray Griffin CB/S; 20 Ray Horton CB; 37 Robert Jackson FS; 26 Bobby Kemp SS; 13 Ken Riley CB; 25 John Simmons CB; 35 Jimmy Turner CB; Special teams (ST): 3 Jim Breech K; 87 Pat McInally P	Reserve: 83 M. L. Harris TE (IR); 27 Bryan Hicks S (IR); 88 Mike Martin WR (IR); 70 Emanuel Weaver NT (IR); 84 Gary Williams WR (IR); Rookies in italics

== Regular season ==
=== Schedule ===
Week	Date	Opponent	Result	Record	Venue	Attendance
1	September 4	Los Angeles Raiders	**L** 10–20	0–1	Riverfront Stadium	50,956
2	September 11	Buffalo Bills	**L** 6–10	0–2	Riverfront Stadium	46,839
3	September 15	at **Cleveland Browns**	**L** 7–17	0–3	Cleveland Municipal Stadium	79,700
4	September 25	at Tampa Bay Buccaneers	**W** 23–17	1–3	Tampa Stadium	56,023
5	October 2	Baltimore Colts	**L** 31–34	1–4	Riverfront Stadium	48,104
6	October 10	**Pittsburgh Steelers**	**L** 14–24	1–5	Riverfront Stadium	56,086
7	October 16	at Denver Broncos	**L** 17–24	1–6	Mile High Stadium	74,305
8	October 23	**Cleveland Browns**	**W** 28–21	2–6	Riverfront Stadium	50,047
9	October 30	Green Bay Packers	**W** 34–14	3–6	Riverfront Stadium	53,349
10	November 6	at **Houston Oilers**	**W** 55–14	4–6	Houston Astrodome	39,706
11	November 13	at Kansas City Chiefs	**L** 15–20	4–7	Arrowhead Stadium	44,711
12	November 20	**Houston Oilers**	**W** 38–10	5–7	Riverfront Stadium	46,375
13	November 28	at Miami Dolphins	**L** 14–38	5–8	Miami Orange Bowl	74,506
14	December 4	at **Pittsburgh Steelers**	**W** 23–10	6–8	Three Rivers Stadium	55,832
15	December 11	Detroit Lions	**W** 17–9	7–8	Riverfront Stadium	45,728
16	December 17	at Minnesota Vikings	**L** 14–20	7–9	Hubert H. Humphrey Metrodome	51,565
Note: Intra-division opponents are in **bold** text.

=== Standings ===
AFC Central
	W	L	T	PCT	DIV	CONF	PF	PA	STK
^{(3)} Pittsburgh Steelers	10	6	0	.625	4–2	8–4	355	303	L1
Cleveland Browns	9	7	0	.563	3–3	7–5	356	342	W1
Cincinnati Bengals	7	9	0	.438	4–2	4–8	346	302	L1
Houston Oilers	2	14	0	.125	1–5	1–11	288	460	L1

=== Game summaries ===
==== Week 1: vs. Los Angeles Raiders ====
Quarter	1	2	3	4	Total
**Raiders**	7	10	0	3	**20**
Bengals	0	0	3	7	**10**

at Riverfront Stadium, Cincinnati

- Date: September 4
- Game time: 1:00 p.m.
- Game weather: 75 °F (24 °C), wind 9 mph (14 km/h)
- Game attendance: 50,956
- Referee: Ben Dreith
- TV announcers (NBC): Marv Albert and John Brodie
- Pro-Football-Reference.com

Game information

**First quarter**

- LA (7:32) – Marcus Allen 1 yard run (Chris Bahr kick) – **Raiders 7–0**

**Second quarter**

- LA (9:05) – Marcus Allen 1 yard run (Chris Bahr kick) – **Raiders 14–0**
- LA (4:59) – Chris Bahr 38 yard field goal – **Raiders 17–0**

**Third quarter**

- CIN (9:23) – Jim Breech 36 yard field goal – **Raiders 17–3**

**Fourth quarter**

- LA (12:25) – Chris Bahr 39 yard field goal – **Raiders 20–3**
- CIN (1:00) – M.L. Harris 9 yard pass from Ken Anderson (Jim Breech kick) – **Raiders 20–10**

**Raiders**

- Jim Plunkett
  14/29, 158 Yds, INT
- Marcus Allen
  17 Rush, 47 Yds, 2 TD
- Malcolm Barnwell
  5 Rec, 66 Yds

**Bengals**

- Ken Anderson
  26/35, 226 Yds, TD, INT
- Stanley Wilson
  4 Rush, 20 Yds
- Dan Ross
  5 Rec, 50 Yds

== Awards and records ==
- Passing: Ken Anderson (297 Att, 198 Comp, 2333 Yds, 66.7 Pct, 12 TD, 13 Int, 85.6 Rating)
- Rushing: Pete Johnson (210 Att, 763 Yds, 3.6 Avg, 16 Long, 14 TD)
- Receiving: Cris Collinsworth (66 Rec, 1130 Yds, 17.1 Avg, 63 Long, 5 TD)
- Scoring: Jim Breech, 87 points (16 FG; 39 PAT)
