= List of NFL annual pass completion percentage leaders =

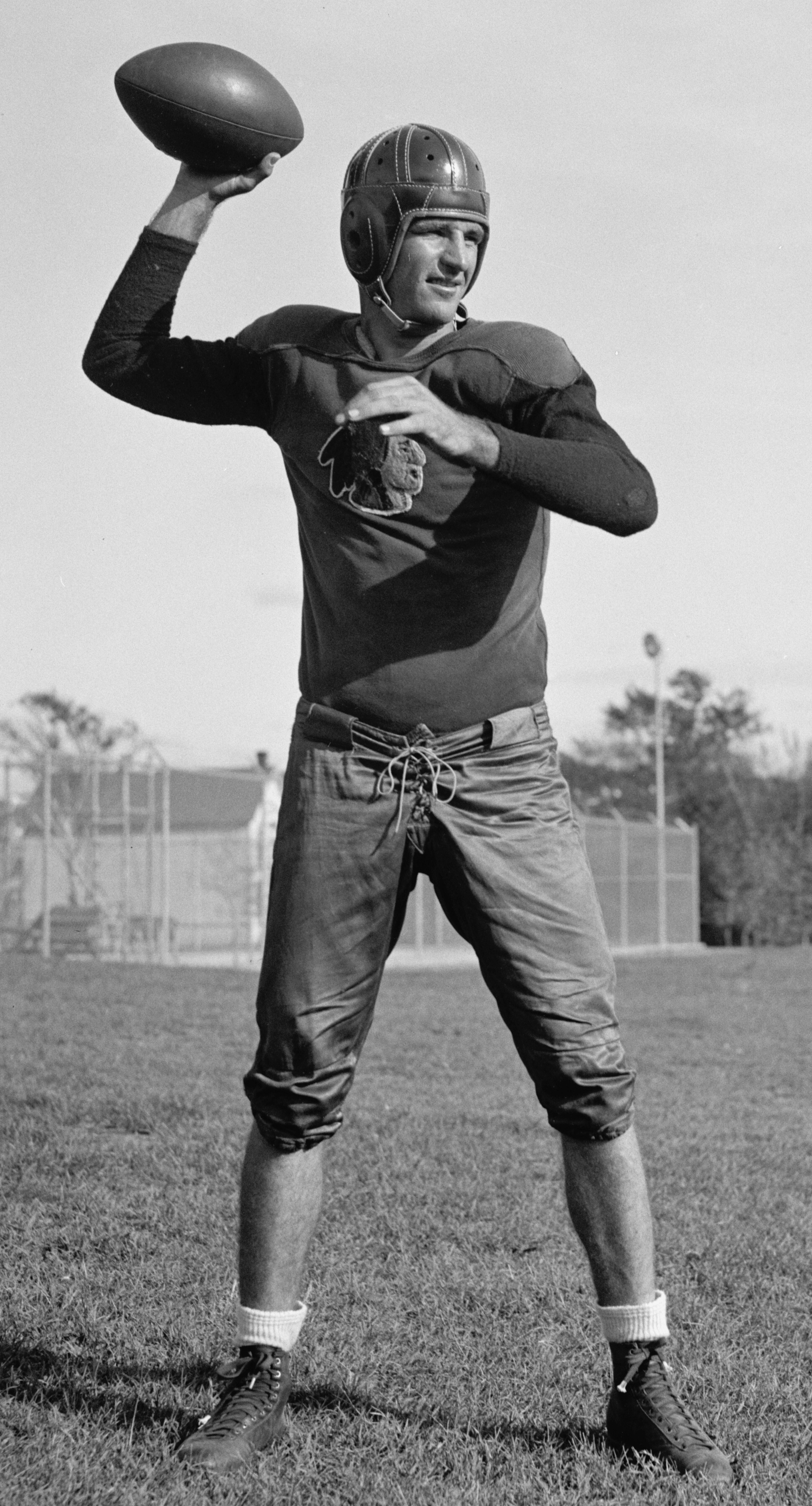
Sammy Baugh led the NFL in completion percentage a record eight times.

This is a list of National Football League (NFL) quarterbacks who have led the regular season in pass completion percentage each year.

The National Football League (NFL) did not begin keeping official records until the 1932 season. In addition to the overall NFL pass completion percentage leaders, league record books recognize the pass completion percentage leaders of the American Football League (AFL), which operated from 1960 to 1969 before being absorbed into the NFL in 1970. The NFL also recognizes the statistics of the All-America Football Conference, which operated from 1946 to 1949 before three of its teams were merged into the NFL, since 2025.

The record for completion percentage in a season is held by Drew Brees of the New Orleans Saints who completed 74.4% of his passes in 2018. This marked the fourth time Brees set the record, having done so previously in 2009, 2011, and 2017. Sammy Baugh led the league in pass completion percentage eight times, a record that was later tied by Len Dawson, who led the AFL seven times and the NFL once.

== NFL annual completion percentage leaders ==
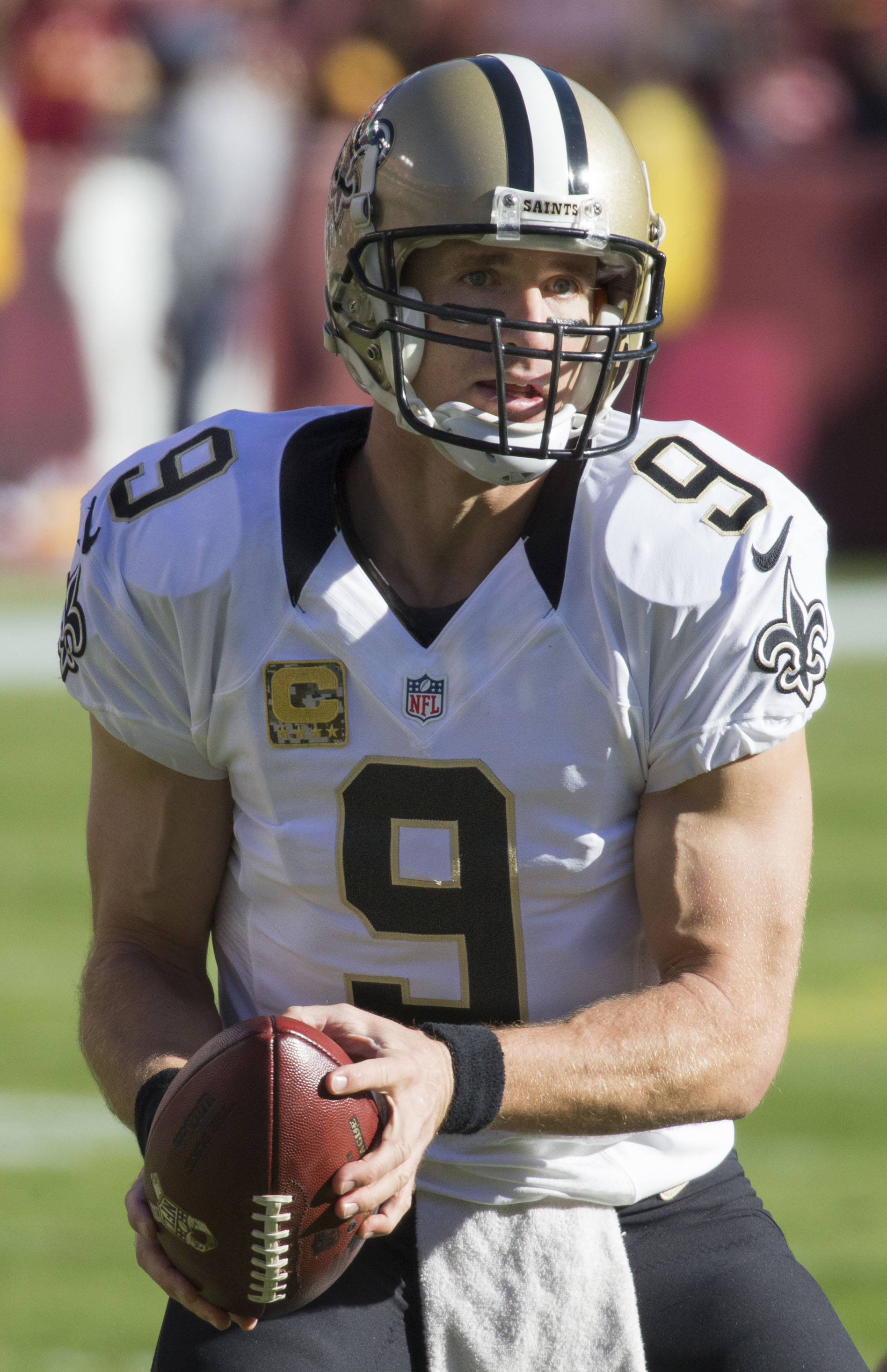
Drew Brees set the single-season completion percentage record a record four times.

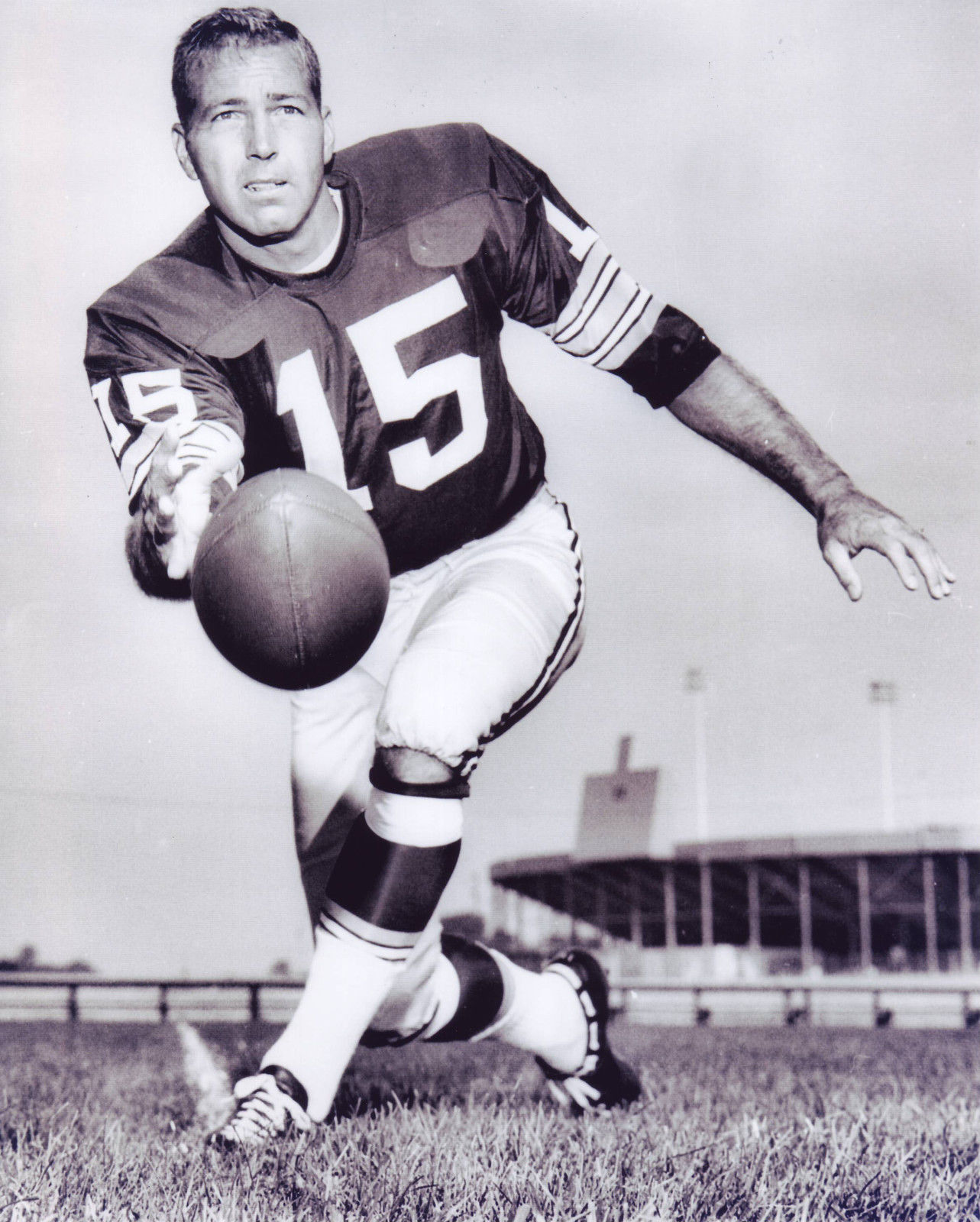
During the 1960s, Bart Starr completed over 60% of his passes in four seasons. Starr led the league in completion percentage during each of those seasons.

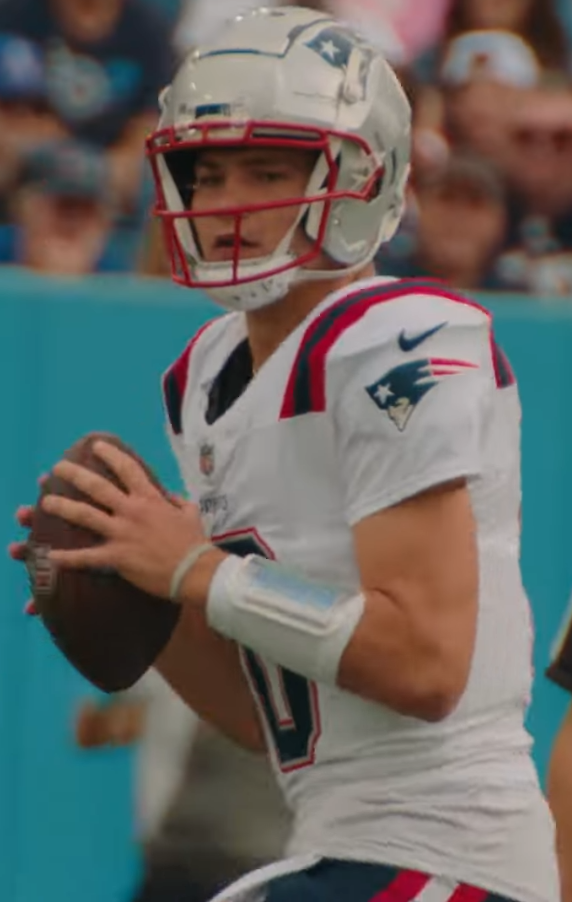
Drake Maye is the most recent passing completion percentage leader, having led the league with a 72.0% completion percentage in the 2025 season.

Key
Symbol	Meaning
Leader	The player who recorded the highest pass completion percentage in the NFL
Cmp%	The player's pass completion percentage for the season
†	Pro Football Hall of Fame member
^	The player is an active player
*	Player set the single-season pass completion percentage record
(#)	Denotes the number of times a player appears in this list

NFL annual pass completion percentage leaders by season
Season	Leader	Cmp% (Note: To qualify, a player must meet a minimum number of pass attempts per team game. 10 attempts per team game for seasons prior to 1975, 12 attempts per team game for the 1976 and 1977 seasons, and 14 attempts per team game from the 1978 season onwards.)	Team	Ref.
1933	Arnie Herber†	40.3%*	Green Bay Packers	
1934	Arnie Herber† (2)	36.5%	Green Bay Packers	
1935	No player met the minimum threshold			
1936	Ed Matesic	46.4%*	Pittsburgh Pirates	
1937	Ed Danowski	49.3%*	New York Giants	
1938	Ed Danowski (2)	54.3%*	New York Giants	
1939	Parker Hall	51.0%	Cleveland Rams	
1940	Sammy Baugh†	62.7%*	Washington Redskins	
1941	Sid Luckman†	57.1%	Chicago Bears	
1942	Sammy Baugh† (2)	58.7%	Washington Redskins	
1943	Sammy Baugh† (3)	55.6%	Washington Redskins	
1944	Frank Filchock	57.1%	Washington Redskins	
1945	Sammy Baugh† (4)	70.3%*	Washington Redskins	
1946	Sammy Baugh† (5)	54.0%	Washington Redskins	
1947	Sammy Baugh† (6)	59.3%	Washington Redskins	
1948	Sammy Baugh† (7)	58.7%	Washington Redskins	
1949	Sammy Baugh† (8)	56.9%	Washington Redskins	
1950	Bob Waterfield†	57.3%	Los Angeles Rams	
1951	Bobby Thomason	56.6%	Green Bay Packers	
1952	Norm Van Brocklin†	55.1%	Los Angeles Rams	
1953	Otto Graham†	64.7%	Cleveland Browns	
1954	Otto Graham† (2)	59.2%	Cleveland Browns	
1955	Otto Graham† (3)	53.0%	Cleveland Browns	
1955	Bobby Layne†	53.0%	Detroit Lions	
1956	Ed Brown	57.1%	Chicago Bears	
1957	Y. A. Tittle†	63.1%	San Francisco 49ers	
1958	John Brodie	59.9%	San Francisco 49ers	
1959	Milt Plum	58.6%	Cleveland Browns	
1959	Bill Wade	58.6%	Los Angeles Rams	
1960	Milt Plum (2)	60.4%	Cleveland Browns	
1961	Milt Plum (3)	58.6%	Cleveland Browns	
1962	Bart Starr†	62.5%	Green Bay Packers	
1963	Y. A. Tittle† (2)	60.2%	New York Giants	
1964	Rudy Bukich	61.9%	Chicago Bears	
1965	John Brodie (2)	61.9%	San Francisco 49ers	
1966	Bart Starr† (2)	62.2%	Green Bay Packers	
1967	Johnny Unitas†	58.5%	Baltimore Colts	
1968	Bart Starr† (3)	63.7%	Green Bay Packers	
1969	Bart Starr† (4)	62.2%	Green Bay Packers	
1970	Sonny Jurgensen†	59.9%	Washington Redskins	
1971	Virgil Carter	62.2%	Cincinnati Bengals	
1972	Norm Snead	60.3%	New York Giants	
1973	Ken Stabler†	62.7%	Oakland Raiders	
1974	Ken Anderson	64.9%	Cincinnati Bengals	
1975	Len Dawson†	66.4%	Kansas City Chiefs	
1976	Ken Stabler† (2)	66.7%	Oakland Raiders	
1977	Fran Tarkenton†	60.1%	Minnesota Vikings	
1978	Bob Griese†	63.0%	Miami Dolphins	
1979	Dan Fouts†	62.6%	San Diego Chargers	
1980	Joe Montana†	64.5%	San Francisco 49ers	
1981	Joe Montana† (2)	63.7%	San Francisco 49ers	
1982	Ken Anderson (2)	70.6%* (Note: Ken Anderson completed 218 of 309 passes in the 1982 season, which represents a completion percentage of 70.55% and was an NFL record at the time. In 2009, Drew Brees broke this record by completing 363 of 514 passes, which represents a completion percentage of 70.62%. Both numbers are rounded to one decimal point in the table, and may appear to be a tie, but Brees actually broke Anderson's record.)	Cincinnati Bengals	
1983	Ken Anderson (3)	66.7%	Cincinnati Bengals	
1984	Steve Bartkowski	67.3%	Atlanta Falcons	
1985	Joe Montana† (3)	61.3%	San Francisco 49ers	
1986	Eric Hipple	63.0%	Detroit Lions	
1987	Joe Montana† (4)	66.8%	San Francisco 49ers	
1988	Wade Wilson	61.4%	Minnesota Vikings	
1989	Joe Montana† (5)	70.2%	San Francisco 49ers	
1990	Jim Kelly†	63.3%	Buffalo Bills	
1991	Dave Krieg	65.6%	Seattle Seahawks	
1992	Steve Young†	66.7%	San Francisco 49ers	
1993	Troy Aikman†	69.1%	Dallas Cowboys	
1994	Steve Young† (2)	70.3%	San Francisco 49ers	
1995	Steve Young† (3)	66.9%	San Francisco 49ers	
1996	Steve Young† (4)	67.7%	San Francisco 49ers	
1997	Steve Young† (5)	67.7%	San Francisco 49ers	
1998	Brett Favre†	63.0%	Green Bay Packers	
1998	Steve Beuerlein	63.0%	Carolina Panthers	
1999	Kurt Warner†	65.1%	St. Louis Rams	
2000	Kurt Warner† (2)	67.7%	St. Louis Rams	
2001	Kurt Warner† (3)	68.7%	St. Louis Rams	
2002	Chad Pennington	68.9%	New York Jets	
2003	Peyton Manning†	67.0%	Indianapolis Colts	
2004	Brian Griese	69.3%	Tampa Bay Buccaneers	
2005	Carson Palmer	67.8%	Cincinnati Bengals	
2006	David Carr	68.3%	Houston Texans	
2007	Tom Brady	68.9%	New England Patriots	
2008	Chad Pennington (2)	67.4%	Miami Dolphins	
2009	Drew Brees†	70.6%*	New Orleans Saints	
2010	Drew Brees† (2)	68.1%	New Orleans Saints	
2011	Drew Brees† (3)	71.2%*	New Orleans Saints	
2012	Peyton Manning† (2)	68.6%	Denver Broncos	
2012	Matt Ryan	68.6%	Atlanta Falcons	
2013	Philip Rivers	69.5%	San Diego Chargers	
2014	Tony Romo	69.9%	Dallas Cowboys	
2015	Kirk Cousins^	69.8%	Washington Redskins	
2016	Sam Bradford	71.6%*	Minnesota Vikings	
2017	Drew Brees† (4)	72.0%*	New Orleans Saints	
2018	Drew Brees† (5)	74.4%*	New Orleans Saints	
2019	Drew Brees† (6)	74.3%	New Orleans Saints	
2020	Aaron Rodgers^	70.7%	Green Bay Packers	
2021	Joe Burrow^	70.4%	Cincinnati Bengals	
2022	Geno Smith^	69.8%	Seattle Seahawks	
2023	Jake Browning^	70.4%	Cincinnati Bengals	
2024	Tua Tagovailoa^	72.9%	Miami Dolphins	
2025	Drake Maye^	72.0%	New England Patriots	

== AFL annual completion percentage leaders ==
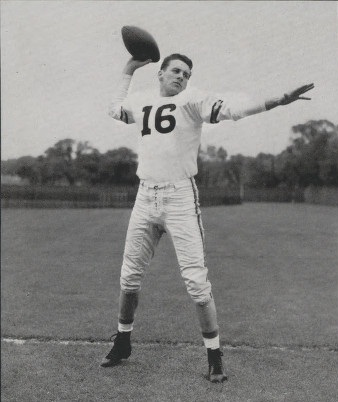
Len Dawson led the AFL in pass completion percentage seven times. He also led the NFL in 1975.

Key
Symbol	Meaning
Leader	The player who recorded the highest pass completion percentage in the AFL
Cmp%	The player's completion percentage for the season
GP	The number of games played by a player during the season
†	Pro Football Hall of Fame member
*	Player set the single-season pass completion percentage record
(#)	Denotes the number of times a player appears in this list

AFL annual pass completion percentage leaders by season
Season	Leader	Cmp%	Team	Ref.
1960	Tom Flores†	54.0%*	Oakland Raiders	
1961	Babe Parilli	52.5%	Boston Patriots	
1962	Len Dawson†	61.0%*	Dallas Texans	
1963	Tobin Rote	59.4%	San Diego Chargers	
1964	Len Dawson† (2)	56.2%	Kansas City Chiefs	
1965	Len Dawson† (3)	53.4%	Kansas City Chiefs	
1966	Len Dawson† (4)	56.0%	Kansas City Chiefs	
1967	Len Dawson† (5)	57.7%	Kansas City Chiefs	
1968	Len Dawson† (6)	58.5%	Kansas City Chiefs	
1969	Len Dawson† (7)	59.0%	Kansas City Chiefs	

== AAFC annual completion percentage leaders ==
Key
Symbol	Meaning
Leader	The player who recorded the highest pass completion percentage in the AAFC
Cmp%	The player's completion percentage for the season
GP	The number of games played by a player during the season
†	Pro Football Hall of Fame member
*	Player set the single-season pass completion percentage record
(#)	Denotes the number of times a player appears in this list

AAFC annual pass completion percentage leaders by season
Season	Leader	Cmp%	Team	Ref.
1946	Charlie O'Rourke	57.7%	Los Angeles Dons	
1947	Otto Graham†	60.6%	Cleveland Browns	
1948	Frankie Albert	58.3%	San Francisco 49ers	
1949	George Ratterman	57.9%	Buffalo Bills	

== Most seasons leading a league ==
Count	Player	Seasons	Team(s)	Ref.
8	Sammy Baugh	1940, 1942, 1943, 1945–1949	Washington Redskins	
8	Len Dawson	1962, 1964–1969, 1975	Dallas Texans/Kansas City Chiefs	
6	Drew Brees	2009–2011, 2017–2019	New Orleans Saints	
5	Joe Montana	1980, 1981, 1985, 1987, 1989	San Francisco 49ers	
5	Steve Young	1992, 1994–1997	San Francisco 49ers	
4	Otto Graham	1947, 1953–1955 (Note: AAFC statistics for Graham's 1947-1949 seasons were not recognized by the NFL until 2025.)	Cleveland Browns	
4	Bart Starr	1962, 1966, 1968, 1969	Green Bay Packers	
3	Ken Anderson	1974, 1982, 1983	Cincinnati Bengals	
3	Milt Plum	1959–1961	Cleveland Browns	
3	Kurt Warner	1999–2001	St. Louis Rams	
2	John Brodie	1958, 1965	San Francisco 49ers	
2	Ed Danowski	1937, 1938	New York Giants	
2	Arnie Herber	1933, 1934	Green Bay Packers	
2	Peyton Manning	2003, 2012	Indianapolis Colts (1) / Denver Broncos (1)	
2	Chad Pennington	2002, 2008	New York Jets (1) / Miami Dolphins (1)	
2	Ken Stabler	1973, 1976	Oakland Raiders	
2	Y. A. Tittle	1957, 1963	San Francisco 49ers (1) / New York Giants (1)	

== See also ==
- List of NFL annual passing touchdowns leaders
- List of NFL annual passing yards leaders
- List of NFL annual passer rating leaders
