= Pete Johnson (American football, born 1954) =

American football player (born 1954)

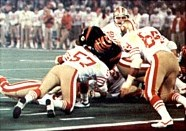
- Johnson (center) with the Bengals in Super Bowl XVI

No. 46, 42
- Position: Fullback

Personal information
- Born: March 2, 1954 (age 72); Fort Valley, Georgia, U.S.
- Listed height: 6 ft 0 in (1.83 m)
- Listed weight: 252 lb (114 kg)

Career information
- High school: Peach County (Fort Valley)
- College: Ohio State (1973–1976)
- NFL draft: 1977: 2nd round, 49th overall pick

Career history
- Cincinnati Bengals (1977–1983); San Diego Chargers (1984); Miami Dolphins (1984)

Awards and highlights
- Second-team All-Pro (1981); Pro Bowl (1981); Cincinnati Bengals 50th Anniversary Team; Second-team All-American (1976); First-team All-Big Ten (1975); Second-team All-Big Ten (1976)

Career NFL statistics
- Rushing yards: 5,626
- Rushing average: 3.8
- Rushing touchdowns: 76
- Receptions: 175
- Receiving yards: 1,334
- Receiving touchdowns: 6
- Stats at Pro Football Reference

Pete Johnson (born Willie James Hammock; March 2, 1954) is an American former professional football player who was a fullback for eight seasons in the National Football League (NFL), primarily with the Cincinnati Bengals. He played college football for the Ohio State Buckeyes and was selected by the Bengals in the second round of the 1977 NFL draft. A dependable short-yardage back, Johnson had four of his eight seasons result in at least ten touchdowns, with the 1979 and 1983 seasons seeing him score 14 touchdowns each. In the 1981 season, he had his only 1,000-yard season in rushing yards that saw him play a key part in the postseason run that culminated in the first Super Bowl appearance in Bengals history; Johnson led all playoff rushers in attempts with 52. At the end of his career in 1984, he was one of just seventeen players with at least 80 career touchdowns in NFL history.

== Early life ==
Born in Fort Valley, Georgia and raised by his great-grandparents, Johnson attended Peach County High School for three years where he played football. He was often called Pete due to his perpetual chasing of a Peter Pan ice-cream truck. Upon the death of his great-grandfather, he moved to New York to live with his mother where he graduated from Long Beach High School in Long Beach, New York, playing football for his senior season. Around seventh grade, he took the "pen name" of Pete Johnson, using his father's last name (upon attending Ohio State, to alleviate confusion over attending class under his the name of Hammock, he legally had his name changed to Johnson).

== College career ==
Johnson played fullback for the Ohio State Buckeyes from 1973 through 1976. In 1973, starting fullback Champ Henson was injured and converted linebacker Bruce Elia was named to start in Henson's place. By the end of that season, freshman Johnson had worked his way up the depth chart. Elia returned to the linebacker corps in 1974, and Henson along with Johnson alternated at fullback.

Although two-time Heisman Trophy winner Archie Griffin got most of the carries at tailback from 1972 to 1975, the Ohio State fullbacks still got the ball frequently and were expected to be major contributors, particularly in short-yardage situations. In 1972, the team's leading scorer was Henson, and in 1973 it was Elia. Johnson's best season was in 1975. Even though Griffin led the team with 1,450 rushing yards, Johnson still rushed for 1,059 yards and set single season records for rushing touchdowns (25) and scoring (156 points).

One of Johnson's more notable performances was in his junior season against North Carolina. While Griffin rushed for 157 yards, Johnson rushed for 148 yards and set a school record with five touchdowns. He finished his career at Ohio State with 2,308 rushing yards and a school record 58 touchdowns (also a Big Ten Conference record). His 348 points was a Buckeyes' record until he was surpassed by kicker Mike Nugent's 356 points in 2004.

In 2000, Johnson was selected for the Buckeyes All-Century Team. In 2007, he was inducted into the Ohio State University Athletics Hall of Fame (with the official induction occurring on September 7) and the Rose Bowl Hall of Fame.

== Professional career ==
A bruising runner and competent blocker, Johnson was a mainstay in the Bengals backfield. He was the team's leading rusher for all seven seasons he played for them, and scored 12 or more rushing touchdowns in three different seasons. His best season was in 1981, where he made his only Pro Bowl selection. In a three-week stretch late in the year in November, he became part of history with a receiving and rushing touchdown in each game to become the first player to have each in three straight games. Johnson set career highs in rushing (1,077 yards), receptions (46), receiving yards (320) and touchdowns (16), leading the team to a 12–4 record, with home field advantage for the AFC playoffs.

In the postseason, Johnson helped the team record their first ever playoff win by rushing for 45 yards, catching 3 passes for 23 yards, and scoring a touchdown in the Bengals' 28–21 divisional victory over the Buffalo Bills. In the AFC title game (known in NFL lore as the Freezer Bowl), Johnson rushed for 80 yards and a touchdown, while also catching a 14-yard reception as the team defeated the high-scoring San Diego Chargers 27–7 to earn their first Super Bowl appearance. Cincinnati lost Super Bowl XVI at the Pontiac Silverdome 26–21 to the San Francisco 49ers, who limited Johnson to just 36 rushing yards and 8 receiving yards. In 1983, he played in just eleven games as he was suspended for the first four games of the season by NFL Commissioner Pete Rozelle after complying with a federal investigation into cocaine trafficking; granted immunity for his testimony, Johnson testified that he had purchased cocaine numerous times in 1980 and 1981.

Prior to the start of the 1984 season, owing to contract demands and disagreements with the team over his weight, Johnson was traded to the Chargers in exchange for running back James Brooks. He left Cincinnati as their all-time leader in rushing yards (5,421), touchdowns (70), and second all-time scorer with 420 points. Johnson spent the first three games of the 1984 season with Chargers. The Miami Dolphins, in need of a back after the injury of Andra Franklin and failed acquisitions of Chuck Muncie and Rickey Young due to drug testing, acquired Johnson in late September. Johnson spent the final 13 games with Miami. In the 1985 offseason, the team tried to get him to lose weight as part of a contract offer, as he weighed over 280 pounds in May. Tasked with getting to 255 pounds by July, he apparently did not show up for the weigh-in for the team and ultimately never played again.

In his eight NFL seasons, Johnson rushed for 5,626 yards, caught 175 passes for 1,334 yards, and scored 82 touchdowns (76 rushing, 6 receiving); at the time of his retirement, he was sixth in NFL history in rushing touchdowns, and as of 2026, he ranks 25th. Bengals guard Dave Lapham described Johnson's style of running in an interview:

We could tell that he’d just wear on defense, you know? People didn’t want any part of tackling him in cold weather in the fourth quarter of games. He just was so thick you couldn’t get your arms around him. He’d just hammer it, man. Just hammer it in there. As a lineman, Pete would just lower his head and just run right up your back. You better make sure you’re doing your thing and getting out of the way because he’ll just run up your backside. Guys didn’t want that happening. I can vividly remember linebackers mumbling hitting him, mumbling like holy s--- I don’t want any part of that. If the Red Sea parted and they were one-on-one in the hole with him – nightmare.

Johnson has an NFL-record three straight games with at least one receiving and one rushing touchdown. He recorded 76 rushing touchdowns and six receiving touchdowns in NFL career for a total of 82 regular season touchdowns; indicative of his utilization for short-yard needs, 63 of his rushing touchdowns came from a distance of the 5-yard line or less.

== Career statistics ==
Legend
**Bold**	Career high

Year	Team	Games		Rushing						Receiving					Fumbles	
Year	Team	GP	GS	Att	Yds	Avg	Y/G	Lng	TD	Rec	Yds	Avg	Lng	TD	Fum	FR
1977	CIN	14	9	153	585	3.8	41.8	**65**	4	5	49	**9.8**	21	0	1	1
1978	CIN	**16**	10	180	762	**4.2**	47.6	50	7	31	236	7.6	**34**	0	4	**2**
1979	CIN	**16**	13	243	865	3.6	54.1	35	**14**	24	154	6.4	15	1	**6**	1
1980	CIN	12	8	186	747	4.0	62.3	57	6	21	172	8.2	28	1	2	1
1981	CIN	**16**	**16**	**274**	**1,077**	3.9	67.3	39	12	**46**	**320**	7.0	33	**4**	4	1
1982	CIN	9	9	156	622	4.0	69.1	21	7	31	267	8.6	25	0	1	1
1983	CIN	11	8	210	763	3.6	**69.4**	16	**14**	15	129	8.6	18	0	2	1
1984	SD	3	0	19	46	2.4	15.3	7	3	2	7	3.5	7	0	0	0
1984	MIA	13	0	68	159	2.3	12.2	9	9	–	–	–	–	–	1	**2**
Career		110	73	1,489	5,626	3.8	51.1	65	76	175	1,334	7.6	34	6	21	10

=== Playoffs ===
Year	Team	Games		Rushing					Receiving				
Year	Team	GP	GS	Att	Yds	Avg	Lng	TD	Rec	Yds	Avg	Lng	TD
1981	CIN	3	3	**52**	**161**	3.1	11	**2**	6	45	7.5	14	0
1982	CIN	1	1	9	26	2.9	14	0	3	7	2.3	9	0
1984	MIA	2	0	16	61	3.8	12	0	0	0	0	0	0
		6	4	77	248	3.2	14	2	9	52	5.8	14	0

=== College ===
Legend
	Led the NCAA
**Bold**	Career high

Season	Team	Rushing				
Season	Team	GP	Att	Yds	Avg	TD
1973	Ohio State	10	34	111	3.3	3
1974	Ohio State	11	70	287	4.1	6
1975	Ohio State	11	**208**	**989**	4.8	**24**
1976	Ohio State	11	172	698	4.1	18
Career		43	484	2085	4.3	51

== Drug charges ==
In 1983, Johnson and another Bengals player testified in exchange for immunity from prosecution that they had purchased cocaine from a Cincinnati plumber, and he was suspended by the NFL for four games. In 1987, he was indicted by a federal grand jury on four cocaine-related charges—and at the time of his indictment, he was selling cars in Miami; according to The New York Times archive, he was found not guilty by a Columbus jury in February 1988.

== See also ==
- List of NCAA Division I FBS players with at least 50 career rushing touchdowns
- List of NCAA major college football yearly scoring leaders
