= Dan Ross (American football) =

American football player (1957–2006)

No. 89, 84, 85, 81
- Position: Tight end

Personal information
- Born: February 9, 1957; Malden, Massachusetts, U.S.
- Died: May 16, 2006 (aged 49); Haverhill, Massachusetts, U.S.
- Listed height: 6 ft 4 in (1.93 m)
- Listed weight: 238 lb (108 kg)

Career information
- High school: Everett (Everett, Massachusetts)
- College: Northeastern
- NFL draft: 1979: 2nd round, 30th overall pick

Career history
- Cincinnati Bengals (1979–1983); New Orleans/Portland Breakers (1984–1985); Cincinnati Bengals (1985); Seattle Seahawks (1985); Green Bay Packers (1986)

Awards and highlights
- Second-team All-Pro (1982); Pro Bowl (1982); PFWA NFL All-Rookie Team (1979); All-USFL (1984); Cincinnati Bengals 40th Anniversary Team

Career NFL statistics
- Receptions: 290
- Receiving yards: 3,419
- Receiving touchdowns: 19
- Stats at Pro Football Reference
- College Football Hall of Fame

Daniel Richard Ross (February 9, 1957 – May 16, 2006) was an American professional football player who was a tight end in the National Football League (NFL) for the Cincinnati Bengals (1979–1983, 1985), Seattle Seahawks (1985), and Green Bay Packers (1986). He also played for the New Orleans/Portland Breakers of the United States Football League (USFL) from 1984 to 1985.

== Early life ==
Ross attended Everett High School in Everett, Massachusetts, where, as a tight end, he starred on the football team.

== College career ==
Ross played college football at Northeastern University in Boston from 1975 to 1978. He was named first-team selection on the College Football All-America Team in his senior year of 1978 while serving as team captain. He also earned the Bulger Lowe Award as the outstanding player in New England and the Harry Agganis Award as New England's outstanding senior.

Ross left Northeastern as the Huskies' all-time leader in receptions (153), receiving touchdowns (13) and receiving yards (2,343). He also set the single-season records for those categories as well, with 68 receptions for 988 yards and seven touchdowns in his senior season. After his senior year, Northeastern retired jersey No. 84 in his honor.

== NFL career ==
After graduating college in 1979, he was selected by the Cincinnati Bengals with the 30th pick in the second round of the 1979 NFL draft. Ross' best season was in 1981, when he totaled 71 receptions for 910 yards and five touchdowns, helping lead the Bengals to Super Bowl XVI. His 71 receptions were a single-season franchise record, and would remain so until Carl Pickens had 99 in 1995.

Ross had an outstanding performance in the Super Bowl, with a record 11 receptions for 104 yards and two touchdowns. His receptions, receiving yards, and receiving touchdowns were all the most by a tight end in Super Bowl history. However, the Bengals lost to the San Francisco 49ers, 26–21, preventing Ross from being the likely winner of the Super Bowl MVP award and first tight end to ever receive it.

In addition to his impressive Super Bowl performance, Ross was the Bengals' leading receiver in both playoff wins that year, with six receptions for 71 yards in their 28–21 win over the Buffalo Bills and five receptions for 69 yards in their AFC title win over the San Diego Chargers, a game known as the Freezer Bowl and the coldest game ever played in the NFL.

Ross went on to make his first and only Pro Bowl selection in 1982 on the strength of 47 receptions for 508 yards and three touchdowns in the nine-game season shortened by a players strike.

In 1984, Ross briefly left the NFL to play for the New Orleans Breakers and later the Portland Breakers in the newly formed United States Football League.

He returned to play for the Bengals in 1985, and finished the season with the Seattle Seahawks.

Ross joined the Green Bay Packers for the following season, and then retired in 1987.

In his eight NFL seasons, Ross recorded 290 receptions for 3,419 receiving yards and 19 touchdowns.

Ross later said that as a veteran of a small college not known for its football program, he was grateful for a chance to play in the big leagues. "Just getting drafted was a thrill. You don't expect it from the school I went to. At the time, you don't expect to play in the National Football League, and especially somebody taking you with the 30th overall pick. It's like 'oh geez they must see something I don't'."

== NFL career statistics ==
Legend
**Bold**	Career high

=== Regular season ===
Year	Team	Games		Receiving				
Year	Team	GP	GS	Rec	Yds	Avg	Lng	TD
1979	CIN	16	16	41	516	12.6	**41**	1
1980	CIN	16	16	56	724	**12.9**	37	4
1981	CIN	16	16	**71**	**910**	12.8	37	**5**
1982	CIN	9	9	47	508	10.8	28	3
1983	CIN	16	15	42	483	11.5	30	3
1985	CIN	6	0	6	63	10.5	20	0
1985	SEA	10	5	10	72	7.2	12	2
1986	GNB	15	10	17	143	8.4	16	1
		104	87	290	3,419	11.8	41	19

=== Postseason ===
Year	Team	Games		Receiving				
Year	Team	GP	GS	Rec	Yds	Avg	Lng	TD
1981	CIN	3	3	**22**	**244**	11.1	19	**2**
1982	CIN	1	1	6	89	**14.8**	**26**	1
		4	4	28	333	11.9	26	3

== Personal life ==
Ross later became president and co-owner of WBWP, an independent TV station in Riviera Beach, Florida. He was owner and president of Power House Supply, while also coaching Pop Warner Football and participating in charity golf tournaments.

In 2004, he was enshrined into the College Football Hall of Fame. Northeastern University also recognized the achievement with a halftime ceremony honoring Ross at the October 9, 2004, home game against Villanova University. He was the first Northeastern University player enshrined in the College Football Hall of Fame.

Dan Ross died at age 49 on May 16, 2006, after collapsing at his home in Atkinson, New Hampshire, shortly after returning from jogging. He died at Merrimack Valley Hospital in Haverhill, Massachusetts.

He was survived by his wife, Joan, and two children, Jillian, then 23, and Dan Jr., then 22.
