= Ken Anderson (quarterback) =

American football player and coach (born 1949)

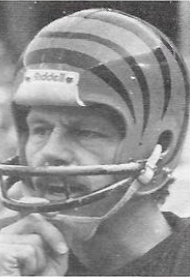

No. 14
- Position: Quarterback

Personal information
- Born: February 15, 1949 (age 77); Batavia, Illinois, U.S.
- Listed height: 6 ft 2 in (1.88 m)
- Listed weight: 212 lb (96 kg)

Career information
- High school: Batavia
- College: Augustana (IL) (1967–1970)
- NFL draft: 1971: 3rd round, 67th overall pick

Career history

Playing
- Cincinnati Bengals (1971–1986)

Coaching
- Cincinnati Bengals (1993–2002); Quarterbacks coach (1993–1995); Offensive coordinator (1996–2000); Quarterbacks coach (2001–2002); Jacksonville Jaguars (2003–2006) Quarterbacks & wide receivers coach; Pittsburgh Steelers (2007–2009) Quarterbacks coach

Awards and highlights
- As a player: NFL Most Valuable Player (1981); NFL Offensive Player of the Year (1981); NFL Comeback Player of the Year (1981); NFL Man of the Year (1975); First-team All-Pro (1981); Second-team All-Pro (1975); 4× Pro Bowl (1975, 1976, 1981, 1982); 2× NFL passing yards leader (1974, 1975); 3× NFL completion percentage leader (1974, 1982, 1983); 4× NFL passer rating leader (1974, 1975, 1981, 1982); Cincinnati Bengals Ring of Honor; Cincinnati Bengals 50th Anniversary Team; As a coach: Super Bowl champion (XLIII)

Career NFL statistics
- Passing attempts: 4,475
- Passing completions: 2,654
- Completion percentage: 59.3%
- TD–INT: 197–160
- Passing yards: 32,838
- Passer rating: 81.9
- Stats at Pro Football Reference
- Coaching profile at Pro Football Reference

Kenneth Allan Anderson (born February 15, 1949) is an American former professional football quarterback who played in the National Football League (NFL) for 16 seasons with the Cincinnati Bengals. He later returned as a position coach.

After playing college football for the Augustana Vikings and earning National Association of Intercollegiate Athletics (NAIA) All-American honors, Anderson was selected in the third round of the 1971 NFL draft by the Bengals. Over the course of his 16-season NFL career, Anderson led the league in passer rating four times, completion percentage three times and passing yards twice. In 1981, he was awarded NFL Most Valuable Player and NFL Offensive Player of the Year, a season in which he led the Bengals to their first Super Bowl appearance. In 1982, Anderson set an NFL single-season record for completion percentage of 70.6%—which stood for over 25 years until broken by Drew Brees in 2009.

As of the end of the 2024 NFL season, Anderson holds the Bengals franchise passing records in yards.

After his professional playing career, Anderson served as a radio broadcaster for the Cincinnati Bengals from 1987 to 1993. From 1993 to 2002, he served as the Bengals quarterbacks coach and offensive coordinator. Anderson later became the quarterbacks coach for the Jacksonville Jaguars (2003–2006) and Pittsburgh Steelers (2007–2009), before retiring in 2010.

Anderson has been a finalist for the Pro Football Hall of Fame three times, and is often regarded as one of the best players not in the Hall of Fame.

== Early life ==
Anderson was born in Batavia, Illinois. Growing up in Batavia, Anderson's backyard adjoined his friend, Dan Issel’s back yard. Anderson's father was a janitor at Batavia High School, and the Issel property on Harrison Street backed onto that of the Andersons' on Republic Road. Growing up together, Issel and Anderson rode in Issel's red Ford convertible and frequented the Twin Elms restaurant. Later, Anderson and Issel would co-own a 782-acre farm in Kentucky. Another neighbor and teammate, Byron Von Hoff, played basketball and other sports at Batavia with Anderson and Issel. Issel became a Naismith Memorial Basketball Hall of Fame basketball player with the Kentucky Colonels and Denver Nuggets. Von Hoff was the second round pick of the New York Mets in the 1966 Amateur Baseball draft and pitched successfully in the minor leagues before an injury ended his career. Another friend and teammate at Batavia was future NBA announcer Craig Sager.

== Professional career ==
After playing for and graduating from Augustana College in Rock Island, Illinois, Anderson was selected in the third round with the 67th overall pick in the 1971 NFL draft by the Cincinnati Bengals, where he would soon become noted for his short-range passes and running. Anderson made four starts in the 1971 season while playing in seven other games (Virgil Carter was the primary quarterback) in a year where the Bengals fell off from a productive previous season. He rushed for 125 yards on 22 total carries for one touchdown while being sacked 23 times. However, Anderson was given more rein in 1972, going 7–6 as a starter with 1,918 yards for seven touchdowns and interceptions while having a 56.8 completion percentage. With 22 carries, he also ran for 94 yards and three touchdowns while fumbling it five times and being sacked eighteen times. The Bengals started 5–2, but they only won three of their next seven to miss the playoffs.

The 1973 season proved better, as Anderson went 10–4 as a starter and threw for 2,428 yards while having eighteen touchdowns to twelve interceptions and had a 54.4 completion percentage, with Anderson helping to lead them to the AFC Central Division title with a six-game winning streak. In the playoffs that year, they were tasked to play the defending champion Miami Dolphins in the Orange Bowl. Special teams helped negate a bad start on offense that meant the Bengals only trailed 21–16 at halftime. However, the Dolphins pressed the Bengals for thirteen unanswered points to win 34–16, aided by a running attack that ran for over 200 yards on Cincinnati's defense. Anderson went 14-of-27 for 113 yards and one interception.

In 1974 Anderson threw for a league high in completions, completion percentage (64.9), yards (2,667) and passer rating (95.7) while going for eighteen touchdowns to ten interceptions, but the Bengals went 7–6 in his thirteen starts. In 1975, Anderson threw for a league high 3,169 yards while throwing for 21 touchdowns to eleven interceptions for a 60.5 completion percentage. He had league highs in yards gained per pass attempt, yards per game and passer rating while being named to his first Pro Bowl and leading the Bengals to a 10–3 record (John Reaves started and won a game without Anderson). One of the finest performances of his early career was in a Monday Night Football game against the Buffalo Bills on November 17, 1975, where Anderson passed for a franchise record 447 yards as the Bengals racked up a franchise record 553 offensive yards in a 33–24 win. It was the Bengals' first ever win in a Monday night game. With Bill Walsh as his quarterbacks coach, Anderson was one of the first quarterbacks to run what would become known as the "West Coast Offense". The Bengals won the AFC Central for the second time in three seasons, but they were tasked to play against the Oakland Raiders away from their stadium (as per the NFL's policy of rotating playoff hosts by year). Anderson went 17-of-27 for 201 yards for two touchdowns. However, the Raiders out-dueled the Bengals with better rushing and time, as they only punted once during the entire game (along with committing two turnovers), and they held on despite nearly blowing a ten-point lead in the fourth quarter to win 31–28. It was the last season with Paul Brown as coach, as he tapped Bill "Tiger" Johnson to replace him, but it was also the last with Walsh with the Bengals, as he left for the San Diego Chargers soon after.

In 1976, Anderson's Bengals won nine of their first eleven games, but the wheels fell off shortly after with them losing two of their next three, which included two losses to the Pittsburgh Steelers, for which the division rival slipped by with a spot due to tiebreakers while the Bengals stayed home. Despite this, Anderson had a Pro Bowl caliber year, throwing for 2,367 yards with nineteen touchdowns and fourteen interceptions for a 10–4 record, although his passer rating and completion percentage all dropped considerably. Anderson and the Bengals regressed in 1977. He went 7–6 as a starter (Reaves played and won his only start), throwing for 2,145 yards with eleven touchdowns and interceptions, but the Bengals still had a chance to make the postseason on the final week. Needing to beat the Houston Oilers, Anderson threw 8-of-23 for 97 yards and one touchdown while being tackled for a safety in an ugly game where the two teams combined for five fumbles and the Oilers won 21–16 to keep the Bengals out of the playoffs.

In 1978, Anderson broke a bone in his right hand, and he did not play in the first four games. The Bengals lost all four with Reaves as quarterback, and Johnson quit as coach after an 0–5 start. Anderson went 4–8 as quarterback, but he passed for 2,219 yards with ten touchdowns and 22 interceptions (a career high). In the 1979 season, Anderson went 4–11 as a starter while throwing for 2,340 yards with sixteen touchdowns and ten interceptions while leading the league with 46 sacks. Anderson went 5–7 as a starter in 1980 with 1,778 yards passing, which was the least he threw as a primary starter. He had just six touchdowns to go with thirteen interceptions.

The 1981 season was the reckoning for Anderson. In the Bengals' opening game against the Seattle Seahawks, Anderson was intercepted twice in the first half and the Seahawks built up a 21–0 first quarter lead. In the second half, with the Bengals trailing 21–10, Cincinnati coach Forrest Gregg benched Anderson and brought in third-string quarterback Turk Schonert (second-string quarterback Jack Thompson was injured at the time). With Schonert in command of the offense, the Bengals stormed back and won the game 27–21. Despite the benching, Anderson would start every game of the whole season. He threw for a career high 3,754 yards while having 29 touchdowns to ten interceptions while leading the league in touchdown/interception percentage along with passer rating (98.4). Anderson also gained another 320 yards and one touchdown on the ground. This performance earned him both the Associated Press and Professional Football Writers of America NFL Most Valuable Player Awards and the NFL Comeback Player of the Year Award. The Bengals went 12–4 and won the AFC Central and the #1 seed in the American Football Conference. Anderson first faced the Buffalo Bills in the Divisional round. He went 14-of-21 for 192 yards with one touchdown as the Bengals outdueled the Bills 28–21, with Anderson's touchdown pass to Cris Collinsworth with 10:39 remaining being the winning score. Anderson and the Bengals had their first postseason win and thus were slated to host the AFC Championship Game. Facing off against future Hall of Famer Dan Fouts and the San Diego Chargers, the game was referred to later as the Freezer Bowl, owing to conditions of −9 °F in Cincinnati on gameday. Anderson lived up to the challenge on the frozen tundra, passing 14-of-22 for 161 yards for two touchdowns as the Bengals led for the entire game and won 27–7 to win their first ever conference championship. In Super Bowl XVI, the Bengals played the San Francisco 49ers, now led by former coach Walsh in a matchup of the two best teams in the NFL. Anderson ended the first drive of the game with an interception, and the 49ers responded with a touchdown six minutes later. The Bengals committed two further turnovers that led to ten subsequent points as the 49ers roared to a 20–0 halftime lead. Anderson led them to a touchdown on the first drive of the second half. The Bengals tried to drive into the endzone midway through the third, but they were stuffed one yard short of the end zone that kept the score 20–7. Despite this, the Bengals made it 20–14 on a touchdown drive capped by an Anderson throw with ten minutes remaining. Five minutes later, trailing 23–14, Anderson threw an interception that led to a subsequent field goal for San Francisco. With two minutes left, Anderson did lead the Bengals on a touchdown drive of 74 yards, but by the time Anderson's throw to the end zone had occurred, there were just twenty seconds left as the 49ers hung on to win 26–21. Anderson completed 25-of-34 passes for 300 yards and two touchdowns and two interceptions while having fourteen rushing yards and a touchdown on five rushing attempts. At the time, his 25 completions and 73.5% completion percentage were both Super Bowl records.

In the strike-shortened 1982 season, Anderson led the Bengals to a 7–2 record, good for third overall in the AFC. He threw for 2,495 yards with twelve touchdowns to nine interceptions while leading the league in completions, completion percentage (70.6) and passer rating (95.3). In the playoffs that year, they were upset by the New York Jets at home, with Anderson going 26-of-35 for 354 yards with two touchdowns and three interceptions in the 44–17 loss. 1983, the Bengals started by going 2–6 in the first half of the season before finishing 7–9 in Forrest Gregg's final season as head coach. Anderson played in thirteen games and went 5–8 while leading the league in completion percentage again while throwing 2,333 yards with twelve touchdowns and thirteen interceptions. The 1984 season was his last primary year as quarterback, and he played in just nine games as starter (with two other appearances), going 3–6. He threw for 2,107 yards with ten touchdowns to twelve interceptions while having a 63.6 completion percentage. He was replaced by Boomer Esiason after the first two games of the 1985 season (having gone 14-of-28 for 156 yards in two games combined)., and he retired after the 1986 season.

In his 16 NFL seasons, Anderson completed 2,654 of 4,475 passes (59.3%) for 32,838 yards and 197 touchdowns and 160 interceptions and also gained 2,220 rushing yards and scored twenty rushing touchdowns on 397 carries. His completions, passing yards, and touchdown passes are all Bengals records. His 2,220 rushing yards are the most ever by a Bengals quarterback. Anderson led the NFL in quarterback rating four times during his career (1974, 1975, 1981, and 1982) and led the league in passing yards twice (1974, 1975). He was selected to four Pro Bowls (1975–76 & 1981–82). Anderson was voted All-Pro in 1981, 2nd Team All-Pro in 1975, and 2nd Team All-AFC in 1974 and 1982. Anderson retired with a 91–81 record as a starter, which is good for 32nd as a starting quarterback all-time (beating out quarterbacks of his time such as Dan Fouts and Roger Staubach).

=== Legacy ===
Anderson finished his career seventh all-time in passing yards (with five of those above him already in the Pro Football Hall of Fame at that time).

While many of his records have since been broken, Anderson held NFL records for consecutive pass completions (twenty), completion percentage for a single game (20-of-22, 90.9%, vs. Pittsburgh in 1974) and completion percentage for a season (70.6% in 1982), as well as the Super Bowl records for completion percentage (73.5%) (since broken by Phil Simms) and completions (25; Tom Brady holds the current record with 43). While Anderson's record for regular season completion percentage happened in a strike-shortened nine-game season, the previous record he surpassed had been set by Sammy Baugh in a ten-game season (1945), in which Baugh threw 125 fewer passes then Anderson did in 1982. Furthermore, Anderson was ranked seventh all-time for passing yards in a career at the time of his retirement. Anderson's record for completion percentage in a season stood for 27 years (broken by Drew Brees in 2009). He led the NFL in passing yards and completions twice, and led the league in fewest interceptions per pass attempt three times. He ranks eleventh in NFL history for postseason passer rating at 93.5.

An argument has been made in comparing Anderson's stats as comparable to ones of his time that have been inducted into the Pro Football Hall of Fame, such as Dan Fouts. Football Outsiders pointed out that in the time of 1973–1984, the two had similar completions and completion percentage while having different touchdowns/interceptions (Fouts threw for more of both) while noting Anderson's dominance over Fouts in rushing (over 2,000 yards for sixteen touchdowns to Fouts' 480 for eleven). Although most of the quarterbacks to have been inducted into the Hall of Fame have won at least one NFL/AFL Championship or a Super Bowl, there have been just eight to have been inducted who did not win a title, and Fouts is one of them. With stats compiled of fellow 1970s quarterback Ken Stabler, Anderson outranks him in games played/started, yards, touchdowns (197 to 194) along with less interceptions (160 to 222). Among quarterbacks to have been the primary starter at the position, Anderson is tied for the second most seasons (thirteen, with Jim Hart) at the position of those eligible for the Hall of Fame to not be inducted (Vinny Testaverde with fifteen is the most). In 2023, Sports Illustrated noted that Anderson is placed higher on Pro Football Reference’s “Hall of Fame Monitor” metric than several quarterbacks who are already in the Hall of Fame, notably including Troy Aikman, Sonny Jurgensen, Len Dawson, Bob Griese, and others.

In terms of AFC Central competition, Anderson went 41–34 in appearances and 36–30 in starts overall against division rivals in the Pittsburgh Steelers, Cleveland Browns, and the Houston Oilers. The toughest rival proved to be Hall of Famer Terry Bradshaw and the Steelers, who won nine division titles in Anderson's era while he won three himself. In sixteen starts against Bradshaw, he went 8–8.

== Coaching career ==
Anderson served as a color analyst for the Bengals’ radio broadcasts from 1987 to 1992. In 1993 he re-joined the team as their quarterbacks coach, a position he held until 1996. He then served as the team's offensive coordinator from 1996 to 2000, and again as the team's quarterbacks coach in 2001 and 2002 he was fired after a poor record with all-time draft bust Akili Smith. In 2003, he became a wide receivers coach for the Jacksonville Jaguars, and was their quarterbacks coach. He was fired after the 2006 season, along with offensive coordinator Carl Smith and special teams coach Pete Rodriguez, by Jack Del Rio. In January 2007, new Steelers head coach Mike Tomlin hired Anderson as his quarterbacks coach under offensive coordinator Bruce Arians. On January 5, 2010, Tomlin announced that Anderson would be retiring, effective immediately. Anderson earned a Super Bowl ring when the Steelers won Super Bowl XLIII.

== Personal life ==
Anderson is married to Cristy and has two daughters, a son, and a host of grandchildren. Anderson currently resides in Hilton Head, South Carolina.

Anderson obtained a Juris Doctor degree from Northern Kentucky University Chase College of Law in 1982 and passed both the Ohio and Kentucky bar exams.

== Honors ==
- Anderson was inducted into the Augustana College Vikings Hall of Fame in 2003.
- In 2013, Augustana College dedicated the Kenny Anderson Academic All-America Club building as part of the Knowlton Outdoor Athletic Complex.
- Although not officially retired by the Bengals, Anderson's number 14 had been held in reserve and not assigned to any player by the team until Anderson started coaching for division rival Pittsburgh Steelers. The holding of number 14 was most evident in 1998, when the Bengals signed Neil O'Donnell, who wore number 14 during most of his career. O'Donnell wore number 12 during his one-year stay in Cincinnati, the only time in his NFL career he did not wear number 14. With Anderson's approval, Andy Dalton wore number 14 for the duration of his Bengals career.
- He has been nominated for the Pro Football Hall of Fame several times, and on two occasions was among the 15 finalists for enshrinement (1996 and 1998). He was a finalist a third time for the senior committee in 2023 but missed out on being one of the final three. In 2011, the Professional Football Researchers Association named Anderson to the PFRA Hall of Very Good Class of 2011.
- In 2008, NFL Network selected Anderson as No. 10 on their list of top 10 players who had not been inducted into the Pro Football Hall of Fame.
- In 2021, Anderson was named to the Bengals inaugural Ring of Honor class.

== NFL career statistics ==
Legend
	Led the league
	AP NFL MVP & OPOTY
**Bold**	Career high

Year	Team	Games			Passing								
Year	Team	GP	GS	Record	Cmp	Att	Pct	Yds	Avg	TD	Int	Lng	Rtg
1971	CIN	11	4	0–4	72	131	55.0	777	5.9	5	4	44	72.6
1972	CIN	13	13	7–6	171	301	56.8	1,918	6.4	7	7	65	74.0
1973	CIN	14	14	10–4	179	329	54.4	2,428	7.4	18	12	78	81.2
1974	CIN	13	13	7–6	213	328	64.9	2,667	8.1	18	10	77	95.7
1975	CIN	13	13	10–3	228	377	60.5	3,169	**8.4**	21	11	55	93.9
1976	CIN	14	14	10–4	179	338	53.0	2,367	7.0	19	14	85	76.9
1977	CIN	14	13	7–6	166	323	51.4	2,145	6.6	11	11	**94**	69.7
1978	CIN	12	12	4–8	173	319	54.2	2,219	7.0	10	**22**	57	58.0
1979	CIN	15	15	4–11	189	339	55.8	2,340	6.9	16	10	73	80.7
1980	CIN	13	12	5–7	166	275	60.4	1,778	6.5	6	13	67	66.9
1981	CIN	16	16	**12–4**	**300**	**479**	62.6	**3,754**	7.8	**29**	10	74	**98.4**
1982	CIN	9	9	7–2	218	309	**70.6**	2,495	8.1	12	9	56	95.3
1983	CIN	13	13	5–8	198	297	66.7	2,333	7.9	12	13	80	85.6
1984	CIN	11	9	3–6	175	275	63.6	2,107	7.7	10	12	80	81.0
1985	CIN	3	2	0–2	16	32	50.0	170	5.3	2	0	44	86.7
1986	CIN	8	0	—	11	23	47.8	171	7.4	1	2	43	51.2
Career		192	172	91–81	2,654	4,475	59.3	32,838	7.3	197	160	94	81.9

=== Cincinnati Bengals franchise records ===
As of 2022, Anderson holds at least 18 Bengals franchise records, including:

- Completions: game (40 on 1982-12-20 @SDG)
- Pass Attempts: career (4,475)
- Passing Yards: career (32,838), playoff game (354 on 1983-01-09 NYJ)
- Passing TDs: playoffs (9), playoff season (5 in 1981), playoff game (2 on 1983-01-09 NYJ; with Boomer Esiason)
- Intercepted: career (160), season (22 in 1978; with Boomer Esiason, Jon Kitna), playoffs (6), playoff season (3 in 1982; with Boomer Esiason, Andy Dalton), playoff game (3 on 1983-01-09 NYJ, with Andy Dalton)
- Sacked: career (398)
- Yds/Pass Att: playoffs (7.96), playoff season (10.11 in 1982), playoff game (10.11 on 1983-01-09 NYJ)
- Pass Yds/Game: playoff season (354 in 1982)
- 300+ yard passing games: playoffs (2)
