= Freezer Bowl =

1982 American football championship

1981 AFC Championship Game
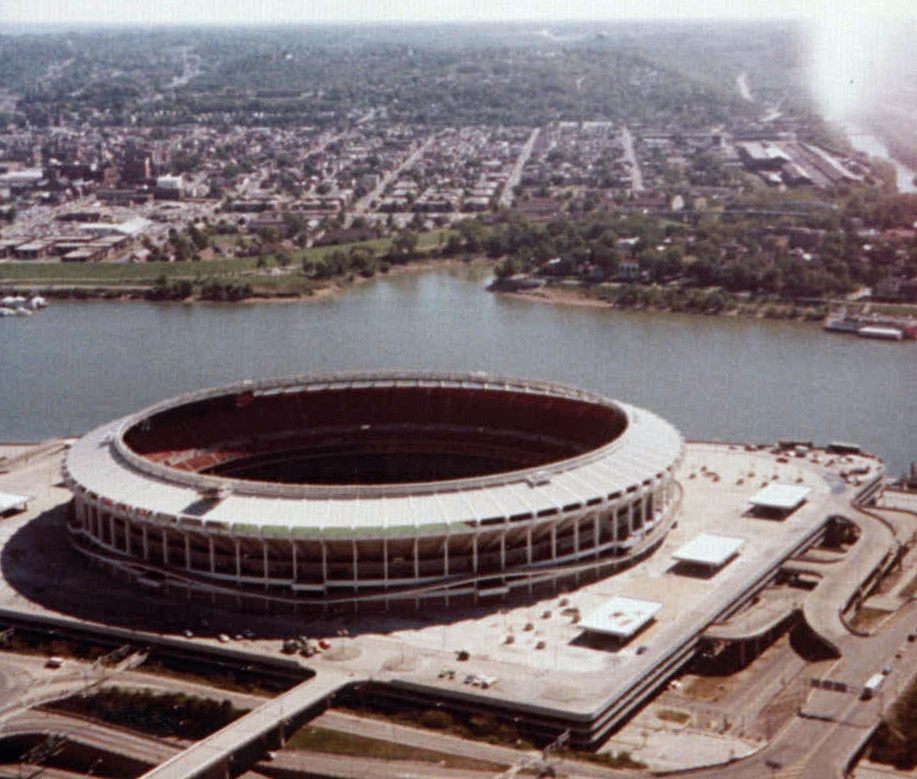
- Riverfront Stadium
| San Diego Chargers (3) (10–6) | Cincinnati Bengals (1) (12–4) |
|---|---|
| 7 | 27 |
| Head coach: Don Coryell | Head coach: Forrest Gregg |
| | 1 | 2 | 3 | 4 | Total |
|---|---|---|---|---|---|
| SD | 0 | 7 | 0 | 0 | 7 |
| CIN | 10 | 7 | 3 | 7 | 27 |
- Date: January 10, 1982
- Stadium: Riverfront Stadium; Cincinnati, Ohio
- Referee: Fred Silva
- Attendance: 46,302

TV in the United States
- Network: NBC
- Announcers: Dick Enberg and Merlin Olsen

The Freezer Bowl was the 1981 AFC Championship Game between the San Diego Chargers and the Cincinnati Bengals. The game was played on January 10, 1982, at Cincinnati's Riverfront Stadium, and televised by NBC, with announcers Dick Enberg and Merlin Olsen. The game, won by the Bengals, 27–7, was played in the coldest temperature in NFL history in terms of wind chill. Air temperature was −9 °F (−23 °C), but the wind chill, factoring in a sustained wind of 27 miles per hour (43 km/h), was reported as −59 °F (−51 °C) under the calculation method then in use. (Note: Under the current wind chill calculation method, adopted in 2001, this would be reported as −37 °F (−38 °C).)

== Background ==
The Chargers' offense featured three future members of the Pro Football Hall of Fame: quarterback Dan Fouts, receiver Charlie Joiner and tight end Kellen Winslow. San Diego also had two running backs, Chuck Muncie, who led the NFL with 19 touchdowns, and rookie James Brooks, who finished the season with 2,093 all-purpose yards. Cincinnati also had several notable players on offense. Quarterback Ken Anderson, a three-time Pro Football Hall of Fame finalist, was the top rated passer in the NFL, and had won both the NFL Most Valuable Player Award and the NFL Comeback Player of the Year Award. The Bengals offensive line featured future Hall of Fame left tackle Anthony Muñoz, who was selected by NFL coaches as the NFL Lineman of the Year Award winner during the season.

Both teams were coming off of narrow wins in the divisional playoffs. A week earlier, the Bengals won their first ever playoff game by defeating the Buffalo Bills 28–21 after forcing Buffalo to turn the ball over on downs during their final drive. Meanwhile, the Chargers defeated the Miami Dolphins in overtime 41–38, in a game that set playoff records for most points scored in a playoff game with 79, the most total yards by both teams with 1,036, and most passing yards by both teams with 809. That game, which became known as “The Epic In Miami”, was played in the heat and humidity of Miami, and the Chargers found themselves dealing with the exact opposite conditions in the AFC title game.

The Chargers went from playing an overtime game in Miami in 88 °F or 31.1 °C, high humidity weather to playing in the −59 °F or −50.6 °C wind chill in Cincinnati, an effective difference of 147 °F or 81.7 °C.

== Overview ==
The game was one of the few in NFL history in which the same team kicked off to begin both halves. Cincinnati won the toss and instead of receiving, elected to have the brutally cold wind at their backs to start the game, believing it would neutralize San Diego's passing game and help the Bengals to build an early lead. Their strategy succeeded, as Cincinnati built a 10–0 lead in the first quarter. San Diego would score their only touchdown in the second, but gave up another score to the Bengals and trailed 17–7 at halftime. Accordingly, San Diego used its option at the beginning of the second half to receive the kickoff, resulting in Cincinnati kicking off to begin both halves—and in the same direction both times, using their second half option to again begin the half with the wind at their backs.

Aided by an 18-yard completion from Anderson to tight end Dan Ross, Cincinnati scored first with a 31-yard field goal from kicker Jim Breech. Then linebacker Rick Razzano forced a fumble from Chargers’ rookie kick returner James Brooks, and Don Bass recovered for the Bengals on the San Diego 12-yard line. Following a 4-yard run by Charles Alexander, the Bengals scored a touchdown on an 8-yard pass from Anderson to tight end M. L. Harris, increasing their lead to 10–0. Brooks returned the ensuing kickoff 35 yards to the 43-yard line. Then on 3rd down and 9, Fouts’ 21-yard completion to Wes Chandler moved the ball to the Bengals’ 33. However, Cincinnati's defense halted the drive at the 18-yard line and it ended with no points when Rolf Benirschke, kicking into the wind, missed a 37-yard field goal attempt.

After a Bengals punt, Chandler gave the Chargers good field position with a 7-yard return to the 45-yard line. San Diego then drove 55 yards and cut their deficit to 10–7 when Fouts, trying to avoid a hit from lineman Eddie Edwards, managed to fire a pass to Kellen Winslow, who subsequently raced from the line of scrimmage 33 yards down the right sideline for a score. The Bengals stormed right back on a drive set up by David Verser’s 40-yard kickoff return to the 46-yard line. Faced with 3rd down and 7 inside the red zone later in the drive, Anderson kept the drive going with a 16-yard completion to Isaac Curtis on the Chargers’ 1-yard line, and fullback Pete Johnson scored a touchdown run on the next play, giving them a 17–7 lead.

The Chargers would move the ball inside the Bengals 40-yard line five times during the rest of the game, but failed to score on each possession. San Diego responded with a drive to the Bengals 33-yard line, but came up empty when defensive back Louis Breeden intercepted a deep pass intended for Charlie Joiner at the 5-yard line. The Chargers defense gave the offense another scoring opportunity, forcing a punt from Pat McInally that went just 32 yards to the Bengals 45. However, Fouts was intercepted in the end zone by rookie safety Bobby Kemp.

On the opening drive of the second half, San Diego drove to the Bengals 38-yard line, only to lose their fourth turnover of the day when Reggie Williams stripped the ball from Chuck Muncie and Cincinnati lineman Ross Browner recovered it. Anderson rushed three times for 31 yards and completed a 19-yard pass to Ross on a drive that moved the ball inside the San Diego 10-yard line. Following three incompletions and a fake field goal touchdown run by Steve Kreider called back by a holding penalty, Breech's 38-yard field goal made the score 20–7. On their next drive, Anderson's five completions moved the ball deep into Chargers territory, but defensive back Willie Buchanon recovered a fumble from Ross that had been forced by Woodrow Lowe. The Chargers then drove to the Bengals’ 20-yard line, but on third down, Fouts tripped over the foot of guard Doug Wilkerson and was downed for an 11-yard loss. Then Benirschke missed a 50-yard field goal try on the next play.

Taking the ball back after the missed field goal, Cincinnati pushed the game with a 14-play touchdown drive. Anderson was injured early in the drive and replaced for two plays by Jack Thompson. Nevertheless, Johnson kept the Bengals moving on those plays, first rushing for 8 yards and then gaining 14 yards on a screen pass on 3rd down and 8. Later on the drive, Johnson converted a 4th and inches situation with a 7-yard run, and Anderson finished it off with a 3-yard touchdown pass to Don Bass, making the final score 27–7. San Diego responded with a drive to the Bengals 5-yard line, but turned the ball over on downs with less than three minutes left.

Fouts completed 15 of 28 passes for 185 yards and a touchdown, with two interceptions; the future Hall of Fame QB sadly noted that the brutal weather conditions made it very difficult for him to throw the ball, adding that he was impressed that Ken Anderson was able to throw spirals during the game. Muncie was the top rusher of the game with 94 yards. Anderson completed 14 of 22 passes for 161 yards and two touchdowns, with no interceptions, and rushed for 39 yards. Johnson rushed for 80 yards and a touchdown, while also catching a pass for 14 yards.

Cincinnati head coach Forrest Gregg had already participated in one of the coldest games in NFL history prior to this one. When he was a player for the Green Bay Packers in 1967, Gregg played in the famous NFL championship game against the Dallas Cowboys that became known as the Ice Bowl.

Brooks, whose fumble helped the Bengals win the game, would later go on to help the Bengals get to Super Bowl XXIII in the 1988 season, this time not as an opponent, but as a player for the team. After spending two more seasons with the Chargers, Brooks was traded to the Bengals in exchange for Pete Johnson, and remained on the team until 1991. Brooks made the Pro Bowl four times with the Bengals and left Cincinnati as the team's all-time leading rusher. Both Winslow and Ken Anderson said that the windchill's effect was so brutal that they have felt its effects decades later—Winslow in noting that he suffers from the residual impact of frostbite in one of his toes, and Anderson because his hands turn cold and numb much more quickly in cold weather now than they did pre-Freezer Bowl.

== Scoring summary ==
- CIN – FG Breech 31 yards
- CIN – Harris 8 yard pass from Anderson (Breech kick)
- SD – Winslow 33 yard pass from Fouts (Benirschke kick)
- CIN – Johnson 1 yard run (Breech kick)
- CIN – FG Breech 38 yards
- CIN – Bass 3 yard pass from Anderson (Breech kick)

== Officials ==
- Referee: Fred Silva
- Umpire: Art Demmas
- Head linesman: Burl Toler
- Line judge: Walt Peters
- Back judge: Jim Poole
- Side judge: Dave Parry
- Field judge: Bob Lewis

== See also ==
- 1981–82 NFL playoffs
- List of nicknamed NFL games and plays
- The similarly named Snow Bowl and Ice Bowl
- Epic in Miami, a game played a week earlier
- The Catch, 1981 NFC Championship game held on the same day
