= Jim Breech =

American football player (born 1956)

No. 5, 10, 3
- Position: Placekicker

Personal information
- Born: April 11, 1956 (age 70); Sacramento, California, U.S.
- Listed height: 5 ft 6 in (1.68 m)
- Listed weight: 161 lb (73 kg)

Career information
- High school: Sacramento
- College: California (1974–1977)
- NFL draft: 1978: 8th round, 206th overall pick

Career history
- Detroit Lions (1978)*; Oakland Raiders (1979); Cincinnati Bengals (1980–1992)
- * Offseason or practice squad member only

Awards and highlights
- Cincinnati Bengals 50th Anniversary Team; 2× First-team All-Pac-8 (1976, 1977); Second-team All-Pac-8 (1975)

Career NFL statistics
- Field goals made: 243
- Field goals attempted: 340
- Field goal percentage: 71.5%
- Longest field goal: 53
- Extra points made: 517
- Extra points attempted: 539
- Extra point percentage: 95.9%
- Points scored: 1,246
- Stats at Pro Football Reference

James Thomas Breech (born April 11, 1956) is an American former professional football player who was a placekicker in the National Football League (NFL) for the Oakland Raiders in 1979, and for the Cincinnati Bengals from 1980 to 1992. Breech played college football for the California Golden Bears. He was notable among kickers for wearing a different size cleat on his kicking foot. He wore a smaller size 5 cleat on his right kicking foot (his normal size was 7) which he felt gave him more control and stability kicking the football.

== Early life ==
At the University of California, Berkeley, Breech was the starting kicker for the California Golden Bears from 1975 to 1977, making 58 of 59 extra points and 32 out of 51 field goals (62%) in his final two seasons. Breech was selected in the 8th round of the 1978 NFL draft by the Detroit Lions, but was cut by the team before the start of the season. He spent the 1979 season with the Oakland Raiders, but they cut him in the 1980 pre-season in order to sign Chris Bahr, who had just been cut by the Bengals. Breech was later asked by Cleveland Browns personnel director Paul Warfield to possibly join the team as a replacement for injured Don Cockroft. However, not hearing back from Cleveland, he received a phone call from the Bengals assistant personnel director Frank Smouse. Breech was signed by the Bengals, and ended up staying there for the remainder of his career.

== NFL career ==
In his 14 NFL seasons, Breech made 243 of 340 field goals (71.4%), 517 of 539 extra points (95.9%), and scored 1,246 total points. His 1,151 points with the Bengals are a franchise record. He is second all-time scoring in consecutive games with 186 consecutive games, and he was a perfect 9 for 9 in overtime field goals, an NFL record. Breech played in 9 postseason games during his career. In all of them combined, he missed just 2 field goals out of 11 attempts and never missed an extra point. Breech also played in Super Bowl XVI and Super Bowl XXIII, was perfect in both games, not missing a field goal or extra point in either one. In Super Bowl XXIII, he kicked 3 field goals and scored 10 of Cincinnati's 16 points in the game. When his third field goal gave the Bengals a 16–13 lead over the San Francisco 49ers with just 3:10 left in the game, it appeared there was a strong possibility he would become the first kicker ever to win the Super Bowl MVP award. However, the 49ers ended that chance by driving 92 yards and scoring the winning touchdown with 34 seconds left in the game. In 1999, he was inducted into the University of California Athletic hall of fame.

== Career regular season statistics ==
Career high/best bolded

Regular season statistics
Season	Team (record)	G	FGM	FGA	%	<20	20-29	30-39	40-49	50+	LNG	BLK	XPM	XPA	%	PTS
1979	OAK (9–7)	**16**	18	27	66.7	1–2	7–7	7–10	3–7	0–1	47	0	41	45	91.1	95
1980	CIN (6–10)	4	4	7	57.1	0–0	2–2	1–2	1–3	0–1	42	0	11	12	91.7	24
1981	CIN (12–4)	**16**	22	32	68.8	0–0	9–11	7–9	5–11	1–1	51	0	49	51	96.1	115
1982	CIN (7–2)	9	14	18	77.8	**2–2**	3–3	5–6	3–5	1–2	50	0	25	26	96.2	67
1983	CIN (7–9)	**16**	16	23	69.6	**2–2**	7–7	5–7	2–5	0–2	47	0	39	41	95.1	87
1984	CIN (8–8)	**16**	22	31	71.0	0–0	9–10	10–12	3–4	0–5	48	0	37	37	**100.0**	103
1985	CIN (7–9)	**16**	**24**	**33**	71.0	0–0	7–8	12–13	4–6	1–6	**53**	0	48	50	96.0	**120**
1986	CIN (10–6)	**16**	17	32	53.1	1–2	4–5	5–7	5–14	**2–4**	51	0	50	51	98.0	101
1987	CIN (4–11)	12	**24**	30	80.0	0–0	6–7	**12–12**	6–11	0–0	46	0	25	27	92.6	97
1988	CIN (12–4)	**16**	11	16	68.8	1–1	5–5	3–4	2–5	0–1	45	0	**56**	**59**	94.9	89
1989	CIN (8–8)	12	12	14	**85.7**	0–0	**9–9**	3–4	0–1	0–0	38	0	37	38	97.4	73
1990	CIN (9–7)	**16**	17	21	81.0	0–0	6–6	5–6	**6–9**	0–0	46	0	41	44	93.2	92
1991	CIN (3–13)	**16**	23	29	79.3	0–0	9–10	8–10	5–6	1–3	50	**1**	27	27	**100.0**	96
1992	CIN (5–11)	**16**	19	27	70.4	0–0	8–8	7–7	4–11	0–1	48	0	31	31	**100.0**	88
Career (14 seasons)		197	243	340	71.5	7–9	91–98	90–109	49–98	6–26	53	1	517	539	95.9	1,246

== After football ==
Breech is a sales executive for the Hauser Group, an insurance firm in the Cincinnati suburb of Blue Ash, Ohio. He also heads the Cincinnati chapter of NFL Alumni and is also on the board of directors for Kicks for Kids, an organization to help needy kids started by fellow former Cincinnati Bengals kicker Doug Pelfrey. He also is a kicking coach for the Lakota East High School football team in Liberty Township, Ohio.
