= Don Kern (American football) =

American football player (born 1962)

No. 89, 84
- Position: Tight end

Personal information
- Born: August 25, 1962 (age 64); Los Gatos, California, U.S.
- Listed height: 6 ft 4 in (1.93 m)
- Listed weight: 228 lb (103 kg)

Career information
- High school: Saratoga (Saratoga, California)
- College: Arizona State
- NFL draft: 1984: 6th round, 150th overall pick

Career history
- Cincinnati Bengals (1984–1985); Buffalo Bills (1986)
- Stats at Pro Football Reference

Don Emit Kern III (born August 25, 1962) is an American former professional football tight end who played in the National Football League (NFL) with the Cincinnati Bengals and Buffalo Bills. He played college football for the Arizona State Sun Devils and was selected by the Bengals in the sixth round of the 1984 NFL draft.

== Early life ==
Don Emit Kern III was born on August 25, 1962, in Los Gatos, California. He attended Saratoga High School in Saratoga, California.

== College career ==
Kern played junior college football at West Valley Junior College from 1980 to 1981. He transferred to Arizona State University, where he was a two-year letterman for the Sun Devils from 1982 to 1983. He played in 22 games for the Sun Devils, catching 58 career passes for 649 yards and one touchdown.

== Professional career ==
Kern was selected by the Cincinnati Bengals in the sixth round, with the 150th overall pick, of the 1984 NFL draft. He signed with the team on June 11. He played in all 16 games in a reserve role during the 1984 season, catching two passes for 14 yards on four targets. Kern appeared in the first eight games of the 1985 season. He was noted as one of the team's "most reliable" special teams players. He was placed on injured reserve on October 29, 1985, after suffering a break below his knee and a chip fracture in his ankle during a punt return on October 27 against the Pittsburgh Steelers. Kern was released on August 25, 1986, after the third game of the 1986 preseason.

Kern signed with the Buffalo Bills on December 17, 1986. He played in one game for the Bills in a backup role and was not targeted any. He was released on July 30, 1987, during training camp.
