= Forrest Gregg =

American football player and coach (1933–2019)

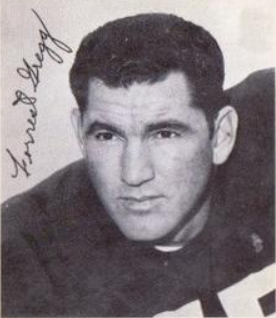

No. 75, 79
- Position: Offensive tackle

Personal information
- Born: October 18, 1933; Birthright, Texas, U.S.
- Died: April 12, 2019 (aged 85); Colorado Springs, Colorado, U.S.
- Listed height: 6 ft 4 in (1.93 m)
- Listed weight: 249 lb (113 kg)

Career information
- High school: Sulphur Springs (Sulphur Springs, Texas)
- College: SMU
- NFL draft: 1956: 2nd round, 20th overall pick

Career history

Playing
- Green Bay Packers (1956, 1958–1970); Dallas Cowboys (1971)

Coaching
- Green Bay Packers (1969) Assistant; Green Bay Packers (1970) Offensive line; San Diego Chargers (1973) Offensive line; Cleveland Browns (1974) Offensive line; Cleveland Browns (1975–1977) Head coach; Toronto Argonauts (1979) Head coach; Cincinnati Bengals (1980–1983) Head coach; Green Bay Packers (1984–1987) Head coach; SMU (1989–1990) Head coach; Shreveport Pirates (1994–1995) Head coach

Awards and highlights
- As a player: 3× Super Bowl champion (I, II, VI); 5× NFL champion (1961, 1962, 1965–1967); 7× First-team All-Pro (1960, 1962–1967); Second-team All-Pro (1959); 9× Pro Bowl (1959–1964, 1966–1968); NFL 1960s All-Decade Team; NFL 75th Anniversary All-Time Team; NFL 100th Anniversary All-Time Team; Green Bay Packers Hall of Fame; First-team All-SWC (1955); Second-team All-SWC (1954); SMU Mustangs Jersey No. 73 honored; As a coach: NFL Coach of the Year (1976); Cincinnati Bengals 50th Anniversary Team

Career NFL statistics
- Games played: 193
- Games started: 156
- Fumble recoveries: 8
- Stats at Pro Football Reference

Head coaching record
- Regular season: NFL: 75–85–1 (.469); CFL: 13–39 (.250); NCAA: 3–19 (.136)
- Postseason: NFL: 2–2 (.500)
- Career: NFL: 77–87–1 (.470); CFL: 13–39 (.250); NCAA: 3–19 (.136)
- Coaching profile at Pro Football Reference
- Pro Football Hall of Fame

Alvis Forrest Gregg (October 18, 1933 – April 12, 2019) was an American professional football player and coach. A Pro Football Hall of Fame offensive tackle for 16 seasons in the National Football League (NFL), he was a part of six NFL championships, five of them with the Green Bay Packers before closing out his tenure with the Dallas Cowboys with a win in Super Bowl VI. Gregg was later the head coach of three NFL teams (Cleveland Browns, Cincinnati Bengals, and Green Bay Packers), as well as two Canadian Football League (CFL) teams (Toronto Argonauts and Shreveport Pirates). He was also a college football coach for the SMU Mustangs.

As a head coach, he led the 1981 Bengals to the Super Bowl, where they lost to the San Francisco 49ers, 26–21.

== Early life and college ==
Born on October 18, 1933, in Birthright, Texas, Gregg attended Sulphur Springs High School in Sulphur Springs and played college football at Southern Methodist University in Dallas. Playing on both the offensive and defensive line at SMU, Gregg earned All-Southwest Conference honors in his final two seasons.

== Professional playing career ==
Gregg was a key player in the Packers dynasty of head coach Vince Lombardi that won five NFL championships and the first two Super Bowls. He played mostly at right tackle, but also filled in at guard. He earned an "iron man" tag by playing in a then-league record 188 consecutive games in 16 seasons from 1956 until 1971. He also won All-NFL honors for eight straight years from 1960 through 1967 and nine Pro Bowl selections.

Gregg closed his career with the Dallas Cowboys, as did his Packer teammate, cornerback Herb Adderley. They both helped the Cowboys win Super Bowl VI in January 1972, making them the only players (along with former teammate Fuzzy Thurston, who was on the Baltimore Colts NFL championship team in 1958 and Tom Brady of the New England Patriots and Tampa Bay Buccaneers) in professional football history to play on six NFL title teams. Gregg wore the number 75 for 15 seasons in Green Bay, but that number belonged to Jethro Pugh in Dallas, so Gregg wore number 79 for his final season in 1971.

It has been reported that Vince Lombardi said, "Forrest Gregg is the finest player I ever coached!" but official Packers team historian Cliff Christl can find no evidence of Lombardi ever saying or writing that. In 1999, he was ranked 28th on The Sporting News list of the 100 Greatest Football Players, putting him second behind Ray Nitschke among players coached by Lombardi, second behind Anthony Muñoz (whom he coached) among offensive tackles, and fourth behind Munoz, John Hannah, and Jim Parker among all offensive linemen. He was inducted into the Green Bay Packers Hall of Fame in 1977.

== Coaching career ==
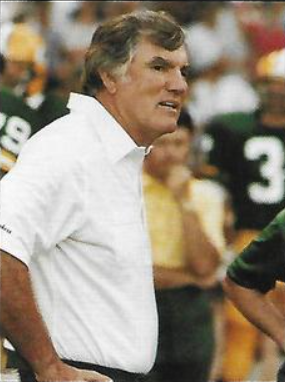
1984 card of Gregg as coach of the Green Bay Packers

After serving as an assistant with the San Diego Chargers in 1973, he took a similar position the following year with the Browns. After head coach Nick Skorich was dismissed after the 1974 season, Gregg was promoted to head coach in 1975, a position he held through 1977. According to Dave Logan, safety Thom Darden and Gregg once had a fist fight after a game. Darden has explained that the 1977 Cleveland Browns did not respond to Gregg's coaching style, which contributed to his firing with one game remaining. In 1977, Darden was one of the vocal dissidents that led to the ouster of Gregg as head coach of the Cleveland Browns.

After sitting out the 1978 season, Gregg returned to coaching in 1979 with the Canadian Football League's Toronto Argonauts. In 1980, he became the head coach of the Cincinnati Bengals for four seasons through 1983. His most successful season as a head coach was in 1981, when he led the Bengals to a 12–4 regular season record. They defeated the San Diego Chargers 27–7 in the AFC championship game (known as the Freezer Bowl), earning them a trip to Super Bowl XVI, where they lost to the San Francisco 49ers, 26–21.

When his longtime former teammate Bart Starr was fired after nine years as head coach of the Packers in December 1983, Gregg was allowed out of his Bengals' contract to take over in Green Bay. He finished his NFL coaching career with the Packers, leading them for four seasons, 1984–1987, with a record of 25–37–1. Gregg's overall record as an NFL coach was 75 wins, 85 losses and one tie. He was also 2–2 in playoff games, all with the Bengals. He is one of only two coaches, the other being Marvin Lewis, to have left the Bengals with a winning record.

Gregg resigned from the Packers in January 1988 and took a pay cut to take over at SMU, his alma mater. He was brought in to revive the Mustang football program after it received the "death penalty" from the NCAA for massive violations of NCAA rules. Though the NCAA had only canceled the 1987 season, SMU canceled the 1988 season as well. After the "death penalty" was handed down, nearly every letterman from the 1986 squad transferred elsewhere, leading school officials to fear that fielding a competitive team would be impossible. Gregg knew that any new coach would be essentially rebuilding the program from scratch, but when acting president William Stalcup asked him to return, he felt he could not refuse.

As it turned out, when Gregg arrived, he was presented with a severely undersized and underweight roster composed mostly of freshmen. Gregg was taller and heavier than nearly the entire 70-man squad. The team was so short on offensive linemen that Gregg had to make several wide receivers bulk up and switch to the line. By nearly all accounts, the Mustangs would not have been able to safely play in 1988 under such conditions.

In 1989, the Mustangs went 2–9, including a 95–21 thrashing by Houston—the second-worst loss in school history. In that game, eventual Heisman Trophy winner Andre Ware threw six touchdown passes in the first half, and David Klingler added four more in the second, even with the game long out of reach. Gregg was so disgusted that he refused to shake Houston coach Jack Pardee's hand after the game. Nonetheless, Gregg reflected fondly on the experience. In a 2012 interview with The New York Times, he said the players on the two teams he coached should have had their numbers retired for restoring dignity to the program. "I never coached a group of kids that had more courage," he said. "They thought that they could play with anyone. They were quality people. It was one of the most pleasurable experiences in my football life. Period."

After the season, Gregg was named SMU's athletic director. The Mustangs went 1–10 in 1990, and after the season, he resigned as coach to focus on his duties as athletic director. Gregg's coaching record at SMU was 3–19, and he served as athletic director until 1994.

He returned to the CFL with the Shreveport Pirates in 1994–95, during that league's brief attempt at expansion to the United States. His overall record in the CFL was 13–39.

When former Shreveport Pirates owner Bernard Glieberman bought a stake in the Ottawa Renegades in May 2005, Gregg was appointed Ottawa's vice president of football operations, a position he held through 2006.

== Personal life ==
Gregg had two marriages. He married Barbara Sue Leach in 1954. He married his second wife, Barbara Dedek in 1960.

In the 1970s, he had multiple surgeries for skin cancer.

He retired to Colorado Springs, Colorado. In October 2011, he was diagnosed with Parkinson's disease, thought to be caused by concussions from playing over two decades of high school, college, and professional football.

On April 12, 2019, Gregg died at the age of 85 due to complications from Parkinson's disease.

In addition to his wife, he was survived by a son, Forrest Jr.; a daughter, Karen Gregg Spehar; and several siblings.

== Head coaching record ==
=== College ===
Year	Team	Overall	Conference	Standing
SMU Mustangs (Southwest Conference) (1989–1990)
1989	SMU	2–9	0–8	9th
1990	SMU	1–10	0–8	9th
SMU:		3–19	0–16	
Total:		3–19		

=== NFL ===
Team	Year	Regular season					Postseason			
Team	Year	Won	Lost	Ties	Win %	Finish	Won	Lost	Win %	Result
CLE	1975	3	11	0	.214	4th in AFC Central	–	–	–	–
CLE	1976	9	5	0	.643	3rd in AFC Central	–	–	–	–
CLE	1977	6	7	0	.462	(fired)	–	–	–	–
CLE total		18	23	0	.439		–	–	–	
CIN	1980	6	10	0	.375	4th in AFC Central	–	–	–	–
CIN	1981	12	4	0	.750	1st in AFC Central	2	1	.667	Lost to 49ers in Super Bowl XVI
CIN	1982	7	2	0	.778	3rd in AFC	0	1	.000	Lost to Jets in AFC first round Playoffs Game
CIN	1983	7	9	0	.438	3rd in AFC Central	–	–	–	–
CIN total		32	25	0	.561		2	2	.500	
GB	1984	8	8	0	.500	2nd in NFC Central	–	–	–	–
GB	1985	8	8	0	.500	2nd in NFC Central	–	–	–	–
GB	1986	4	12	0	.250	4th in NFC Central	–	–	–	–
GB	1987	5	9	1	.367	3rd in NFC Central	–	–	–	–
GB total		25	37	1	.447		–	–	–	
NFL total		75	85	1	.469		2	2	.500	

=== CFL ===
Team	Year	Regular season					Postseason			
Team	Year	Won	Lost	Ties	Win %	Finish	Won	Lost	Win %	Result
TOR	1979	5	11	0	.313	4th in CFL East	–	–	–	–
TOR total		5	11	0	.313		–	–	–	
SHP	1994	3	15	0	.167	6th in CFL East	–	–	–	–
SHP	1995	5	13	0	.278	5th in CFL South	–	–	–	–
SHP total		8	28	0	.222		–	–	–	
CFL total		13	39	0	.250		–	–	–	
