= Rodney Tate =

American football player (born 1959)

No. 23, 44
- Position: Running back

Personal information
- Born: February 14, 1959 (age 67); Okmulgee, Oklahoma, U.S.
- Listed height: 5 ft 11 in (1.80 m)
- Listed weight: 190 lb (86 kg)

Career information
- High school: Beggs (OK)
- College: Texas
- NFL draft: 1982: 4th round, 110th overall pick

Career history
- Cincinnati Bengals (1982–1983); Atlanta Falcons (1984)

Career NFL statistics
- Rushing yards: 79
- Rushing average: 2.9
- Receptions: 18
- Receiving yards: 142
- Stats at Pro Football Reference

Rodney Tate (born February 14, 1959) is an American former professional football player who was a running back in the National Football League (NFL). He played college football for the Texas Longhorns. He played in the NFL for the Cincinnati Bengals from 1982 to 1983 and for the Atlanta Falcons in 1984.

Tate was a top recruit out of Beggs High School in 1978 and part of the 1975 State Championship Team and also won multiple state championships in track for sprinting. Though recruited by home-state Oklahoma he made the unusual choice of going to the University of Texas.

At Texas he played both football and ran track. During his senior year, the Longhorns spent one week ranked #1 and finished the year ranked #2 after beating Alabama in the Cotton Bowl. Though frequent injuries kept him off the field, getting only 170 touches over 4 seasons, his explosive speed caught the attention of NFL Scouts.

In track he set the school record, later broken, in the 60 yard dash.

In the NFL, he returned a kick-off return for 101 yards during a preseason game, but saw little playing time in his two years in Cincinnati and less in Atlanta.

After the NFL he returned to Texas to get degrees in sociology and communications and work as a graduate assistant coach hoping to catch on in college football coaching, but no offers came. He returned to his home town to run a lawn care business with his brother and then became a football, track and cross-country coach at his old high school, helping them to get to the 2017 state championship game. In 2022, the school named their football stadium for him.
