= Mike St. Clair =

American football player (born 1953)

No. 74, 72
- Position: Defensive end

Personal information
- Born: September 2, 1953 (age 73); Cleveland, Ohio, U.S.
- Listed height: 6 ft 5 in (1.96 m)
- Listed weight: 248 lb (112 kg)

Career information
- High school: East Tech (Cleveland)
- College: Grambling State
- NFL draft: 1976: 4th round, 99th overall pick

Career history
- Cleveland Browns (1976–1979); Cincinnati Bengals (1980–1982); San Antonio Gunslingers (1984)

Career NFL statistics
- Sacks: 21
- Fumble recoveries: 6
- Defensive TDs: 1
- Stats at Pro Football Reference

Richard Michael St. Clair (born September 2, 1953) is an American former professional football player who was a defensive end for seven seasons in the National Football League (NFL) for the Cleveland Browns and Cincinnati Bengals, and later in the United States Football League (USFL) for the San Antonio Gunslingers. He played college football for the Grambling State Tigers.
