= Steve Maidlow =

American football player (born 1960)

No. 47, 90, 59
- Position: Linebacker

Personal information
- Born: June 6, 1960 (age 66); Lansing, Michigan, U.S.
- Listed height: 6 ft 2 in (1.88 m)
- Listed weight: 234 lb (106 kg)

Career information
- High school: East Lansing (East Lansing, Michigan)
- College: Michigan State
- NFL draft: 1983: 4th round, 109th overall pick

Career history
- Cincinnati Bengals (1983–1984); Buffalo Bills (1985); Houston Oilers (1987)*; Buffalo Bills (1987)
- * Offseason or practice squad member only

Career NFL statistics
- Fumble recoveries: 1
- Stats at Pro Football Reference

Steven Kenneth Maidlow (born June 6, 1960) is an American former professional football player who was a linebacker in the National Football League (NFL) for the Cincinnati Bengals and the Buffalo Bills. He played college football for the Michigan State Spartans from 1978 to 1982, where he was a three-year starter and a two-year All-Big Ten honoree. He was selected by the Bengals in the fourth round of the 1983 NFL draft. Maidlow resides in Cincinnati, Ohio with his wife Karen.
