= Jimmy Turner (American football) =

American football player (born 1959)

No. 35, 21
- Position: Defensive back

Personal information
- Born: June 15, 1959 (age 67); Sherman, Texas, U.S.
- Listed height: 6 ft 0 in (1.83 m)
- Listed weight: 187 lb (85 kg)

Career information
- High school: Sherman (Texas)
- College: UCLA (1978–1982)
- NFL draft: 1983: 3rd round, 81st overall pick

Career history
- Cincinnati Bengals (1983–1986); Atlanta Falcons (1986–1987)

Career NFL statistics
- Interceptions: 2
- Fumble recoveries: 1
- Stats at Pro Football Reference

James Lee Turner (born June 15, 1959) is an American former professional football player who was a defensive back for five seasons in the National Football League (NFL) with the Cincinnati Bengals and Atlanta Falcons. He was selected by the Bengals in the third round of the 1983 NFL draft after playing college football for the UCLA Bruins.

== Early life and college ==
James Lee Turner was born on June 15, 1959, in Sherman, Texas. He attended Sherman High School in Sherman.

Turner was a member of the UCLA Bruins football team from 1978 to 1982. He was a letterman in 1979 and then again from 1980 to 1982. He recorded one interception in 1978, five interceptions in 1980, three interceptions in 1981, and two interceptions in 1982.

== Professional career ==
Turner was selected by the Cincinnati Bengals in the third round, with the 81st overall pick, of the 1983 NFL draft, and by the Philadelphia Stars in the seventh round, with the 80th overall pick, of the 1983 USFL draft. He officially signed with the Bengals on May 31, 1983. Turner played in all 16 games for the Bengals during his rookie year in 1983. He appeared in all 16 games, starting eight, in 1984, recording one interception and one fumble recovery. He played in all 16 games for the third consecutive year in 1985 and made a 40-yard interception return. He was released on September 1, 1986, and later re-signed on September 16, 1986. Turner played in eight games for the Bengals during the 1986 season before being released again on November 10, 1986.

Turner signed with the Atlanta Falcons on November 12, 1986. He appeared in six games for the Falcons that season. He became a free agent after the season and re-signed with the Falcons. He was released on September 8, 1987, but re-signed on September 13. He played in two games for the Falcons that year before being released on November 24, 1987. He had also spent part of the season on injured reserve.
