= Louis Breeden =

American football player (born 1953)

No. 34
- Position: Cornerback

Personal information
- Born: October 26, 1953 (age 73); Hamlet, North Carolina, U.S.
- Listed height: 5 ft 11 in (1.80 m)
- Listed weight: 185 lb (84 kg)

Career information
- High school: Hamlet
- College: North Carolina Central
- NFL draft: 1977: 7th round, 187th overall pick

Career history
- Cincinnati Bengals (1977–1987)

Awards and highlights
- First-team All-Pro (1982)

Career NFL statistics
- Interceptions: 33
- Interception yards: 558
- Fumble recoveries: 3
- Sacks: 4
- Defensive touchdowns: 2
- Stats at Pro Football Reference

Louis Everett Breeden (born October 26, 1953) is an American former professional football player who was a cornerback for the Cincinnati Bengals (1978–1987) of the National Football League (NFL). He played college football for the North Carolina Central Eagles.

== Career ==
Before his NFL career, Breeden played for North Carolina Central University. After graduating from college, he was selected by the Bengals in the seventh round of the 1977 NFL draft. He ended up missing the entire 1977 season on injured reserve, but in 1978, he became a starter and immediately made a big impact for Cincinnati, intercepting 3 passes and recovering 2 fumbles. Breeden once again had injury problems during the 1979 season, playing just 10 games and recording no interceptions, but he came back full-time in 1980, and ended up leading the Bengals with a career-high 7 picks.

In 1981, Breeden set a Bengals record in a game against the San Diego Chargers by intercepting a pass from Chargers future hall of fame quarterback Dan Fouts and returning it 102 yards for a touchdown, helping his team win the game 40–17. To this day it is the longest play in franchise history, although it has been tied by Eric Bieniemy's 102 yard kickoff return in 1997 against the New York Giants, and Artrell Hawkins' 102 yard interception return in 2002 against the Houston Texans. Breeden finished the season with 4 interceptions, 145 return yards, 1 touchdown, and a fumble recovery, assisting the Bengals to a 12–4 regular season record. Cincinnati advanced through the postseason to the AFC championship game, where they once again faced Fouts' Chargers, this time in one of the coldest games in NFL history (it later became known as the Freezer Bowl). Just like in the previous game, Breeden had a key interception that helped his team win the game. After the Bengals built a 17–7 lead, Breeden intercepted a pass from Fouts on the Chargers 5-yard line to prevent them from responding with a score. The Chargers never scored again for the rest of the game and the Bengals ended up winning the game 27–7, and advanced to their first championship game in franchise history, Super Bowl XVI.

Breeden spent his entire NFL career with the Bengals and retired after the 1987 season. In his 10 NFL seasons, Breeden recorded 33 interceptions for 558 yards and 2 touchdowns, while also recovering 2 fumbles. His interceptions and return yards are both the second most in Bengals history behind Ken Riley.

== Retired life ==
Breeden was the owner of Louis Breeden Promotions, an advertising company in Cincinnati. He remains good friends with former teammates David Fulcher, Barney Bussey, Isaac Curtis and John Simmons.
