= Guy Frazier =

American football player (born 1959)

No. 49, 58, 52
- Position: Linebacker

Personal information
- Born: July 20, 1959 (age 67); Detroit, Michigan, U.S.
- Listed height: 6 ft 2 in (1.88 m)
- Listed weight: 215 lb (98 kg)

Career information
- High school: Cass Tech (Detroit)
- College: Wyoming
- NFL draft: 1981: 4th round, 93rd overall pick

Career history
- Cincinnati Bengals (1981–1984); Buffalo Bills (1985–1986); Miami Dolphins (1986)*
- * Offseason or practice squad member only

Career NFL statistics
- Sacks: 5
- Fumble recoveries: 2
- Interceptions: 1
- Stats at Pro Football Reference

Guy Shelton Frazier (born July 20, 1959) is an American former professional football player who was a linebacker in the National Football League (NFL) for the Cincinnati Bengals from 1981 to 1984 and the Buffalo Bills from 1985 to 1986. He played college football for the Wyoming Cowboys. He played high school football at Cass Technical High School, graduating in 1977. Frazier was selected 93rd overall by the Bengals in the fourth round of the 1981 NFL draft, and returned to Detroit in 1982 as a rookie with the Bengals in Super Bowl XVI. Frazier made the first hit of the game against the San Francisco 49ers on the opening kickoff causing a fumble that was recovered by teammate John Simmons. That was the first time in Super Bowl history that a turnover occurred on the opening kickoff. The Bengals were unable to capitalize on the turnover and subsequently lost.
