= Jim Hannula =

American football player (born 1959)

No. 66
- Position: Offensive tackle

Personal information
- Born: July 2, 1959 (age 67); Elgin, Illinois, U.S.
- Listed height: 6 ft 6 in (1.98 m)
- Listed weight: 264 lb (120 kg)

Career information
- High school: St. Edward Central Catholic (Elgin)
- College: Northern Illinois
- NFL draft: 1981: 9th round, 229th overall pick

Career history
- Cincinnati Bengals (1983)

Career NFL statistics
- Games played: 15
- Stats at Pro Football Reference

Jim Hannula (born July 2, 1959) is an American former professional football player who was a tackle for the Cincinnati Bengals of the National Football League (NFL) in 1983. He played college football for the Northern Illinois Huskies.
