= Blake Moore (American football) =

American football player (born 1958)

No. 60
- Positions: Center, guard

Personal information
- Born: May 8, 1958 (age 68); Durham, North Carolina, U.S.
- Listed height: 6 ft 5 in (1.96 m)
- Listed weight: 267 lb (121 kg)

Career information
- High school: Chattanooga (TN) Baylor
- College: Wooster
- NFL draft: 1980: undrafted

Career history
- Cincinnati Bengals (1980–1983); Green Bay Packers (1984–1985)

Career NFL statistics
- Games played: 77
- Games started: 13
- Touchdowns: 2
- Stats at Pro Football Reference

Edward Blake Moore Jr. (born May 8, 1958) is a former offensive lineman in the National Football League (NFL) who played for the Cincinnati Bengals and Green Bay Packers. Moore played collegiate ball for the College of Wooster and played professionally in the NFL for 6 seasons. He retired in 1985.

After his playing career, he would receive a J.D. degree from Harvard Law School.
