= Mike Obrovac =

American gridiron football player (1955–2018)

No. 68
- Positions: Tackle, guard

Personal information
- Born: October 11, 1955; Canton, Ohio
- Died: March 20, 2018 (aged 62)
- Listed height: 6 ft 6 in (1.98 m)
- Listed weight: 275 lb (125 kg)

Career information
- High school: Canton (OH) McKinley
- College: Bowling Green
- NFL draft: 1978: undrafted

Career history
- Toronto Argonauts (1978–1980); Cincinnati Bengals (1981–1984); Green Bay Packers (1985)*
- * Offseason or practice squad member only
- Stats at Pro Football Reference

Mike Obrovac (October 11, 1955 – March 20, 2018) was an American football tackle and guard. He played for the Toronto Argonauts from 1979 to 1980 and for the Cincinnati Bengals from 1981 to 1983.

He died on March 20, 2018, at age 62.
