= Bryan Hicks =

American football player (born 1957)

No. 27
- Position: Safety

Personal information
- Born: January 24, 1957 (age 69); Lake Charles, Louisiana, U.S.
- Listed height: 6 ft 0 in (1.83 m)
- Listed weight: 192 lb (87 kg)

Career information
- High school: St. Louis Catholic (Lake Charles)
- College: McNeese State
- NFL draft: 1980: 5th round, 113th overall pick

Career history
- Cincinnati Bengals (1980–1982)

Career NFL statistics
- Interceptions: 1
- Fumble recoveries: 3
- Sacks: 1
- Stats at Pro Football Reference

Mark Bryan Hicks (born January 24, 1957) is an American former professional football player who was a safety for three seasons with the Cincinnati Bengals of the National Football League (NFL). He played college football for the McNeese State Cowboys.
