= John Simmons (American football) =

American football player (born 1958)

No. 25, 32, 41
- Position: Defensive back

Personal information
- Born: December 1, 1958 (age 67); Little Rock, Arkansas, U.S.
- Listed height: 5 ft 11 in (1.80 m)
- Listed weight: 192 lb (87 kg)

Career information
- High school: Parkview (Little Rock)
- College: SMU
- NFL draft: 1981: 3rd round, 64th overall pick

Career history
- Cincinnati Bengals (1981–1986); Green Bay Packers (1986); Indianapolis Colts (1987)

Awards and highlights
- Consensus All-American (1980); First-team All-SWC (1980)

Career NFL statistics
- Interceptions: 2
- Fumble recoveries: 4
- Sacks: 1
- Stats at Pro Football Reference

John Christopher Simmons (born December 1, 1958) is an American former professional football player who was a defensive back for seven seasons in the National Football League (NFL) during the 1980s. Simmons played college football for the SMU Mustangs, earning consensus All-American honors in 1980. He played professionally for the Cincinnati Bengals, Green Bay Packers, and Indianapolis Colts of the NFL.

Simmons was born in Little Rock, Arkansas.
