= 1990 Cincinnati Bengals season =

NFL team season

- General manager: Paul Brown
- Head coach: Sam Wyche
- Defensive coordinator: Dick LeBeau
- Home stadium: Riverfront Stadium

Results
- Record: 9–7
- Division place: 1st AFC Central
- Playoffs: Won Wild Card Playoffs (vs. Oilers) 41–14; Lost Divisional Playoffs (at Raiders) 10–20
- Pro Bowlers: T Anthony Muñoz; TE Rodney Holman; RB James Brooks; SS David Fulcher

The 1990 Cincinnati Bengals season was the franchise's 23rd year in professional football and its 21st with the National Football League (NFL). The Bengals won the AFC Central division for the second time in three seasons.

The Bengals would finish the season 9–7 and make the playoffs. In the postseason, Cincinnati won over the Houston Oilers in the wild-card round 41–14, but lost to the Los Angeles Raiders 20–10 in the divisional round. The Bengals would not make the playoffs again until the 2005 season and would not win a playoff game again until their Super Bowl-appearing 2021 season beginning what eventually became an 8-game playoff losing streak, tied with the Detroit Lions for longest in NFL history.

== Offseason ==
=== NFL draft ===
1990 Cincinnati Bengals draft
Round	Pick	Player	Position	College	Notes
1	12	James Francis	Linebacker	Baylor	
2	38	Harold Green *	Running back	South Carolina	
3	65	Bernard Clark	Linebacker	Miami (FL)	
4	91	Mike Brennan	Offensive tackle	Notre Dame	
5	122	Lynn James	Wide receiver	Arizona State	
6	150	Don Odegard	Cornerback	UNLV	
7	177	Craig Ogletree	Linebacker	Auburn	
8	204	Doug Wellsandt	Tight end	Washington State	
9	234	Mitchell Price	Cornerback	Tulane	
10	261	Eric Crigler	Offensive tackle	Murray State	
11	288	Tim O'Connor	Offensive tackle	Virginia	
12	314	Andre Riley	Wide receiver	Washington	
Made roster * Made at least one Pro Bowl during career

=== Undrafted free agents ===
1990 undrafted free agents of note
Player	Position	College
David Clark	Running back	Dartmouth
Gary Guseman	Kicker	Miami (FL)
Tyreese Herds	Cornerback	Kansas State
Larry Hasgrove	Cornerback	Ohio
David Hodge	Tight end	South Carolina
Stuart Maberg	Tackle	Connecticut
Dan Murray	Linebacker	East Stroudsburg
Robert Myers	Punter	Washington State
Jason Novacek	Tight end	Fresno State
Craig Patterson	Nose tackle	BYU
Kirk Scrafford	Guard	Montana
Scott Segrist	Kicker	Texas Tech
John Simpson	Wide receiver	Baylor
Rob Varano	Wide receiver	Lehigh
Todd White	Wide receiver	Cal State-Fullerton
Sean Whiteman	Cornerback	Syracuse

== Personnel ==
=== Staff ===
1990 Cincinnati Bengals staff
Front office: President – John Sawyer; General Manager – Paul Brown; Assistant General Manager – Mike Brown; Director of Player Personnel – Pete Brown; Head coaches: Head Coach – Sam Wyche; Offensive coaches: Quarterbacks – Dana Bible; Running Backs – Jim Anderson; Wide Receivers – Mike Stock; Tight Ends – Bill Johnson; Offensive Line – Jim McNally	Defensive coaches: Defensive Coordinator/Defensive Backs – Dick LeBeau; Defensive Line – Chuck Studley; Linebackers – Dick Selcer; Special teams coaches: Special Teams – Marv Braden; Strength and conditioning: Strength – Kim Wood

=== Roster ===
1990 Cincinnati Bengals roster
Quarterbacks (QB): 7 Boomer Esiason; 10 Todd Philcox; 4 Erik Wilhelm; Running backs (RB): 42 Eric Ball KR; 21 James Brooks; 28 Harold Green; 36 Stanford Jennings KR; 30 Ickey Woods FB; Wide receivers (WR): 86 Mike Barber; 81 Eddie Brown; 80 Lynn James; 85 Tim McGee; Tight ends (TE): 82 Rodney Holman; 84 Eric Kattus; 87 Jim Riggs	Offensive linemen (OL): 60 Mike Brennan T; 68 Paul Jetton G/C; 64 Bruce Kozerski C; 73 Ken Moyer G; 78 Anthony Muñoz T; 75 Bruce Reimers G; 76 Kirk Scrafford T; 63 Joe Walter T; Defensive linemen (DL): 99 Jason Buck DE; 98 David Grant DE; 71 Mike Hammerstein NT; 69 Tim Krumrie NT; 72 Skip McClendon DE; 96 Natu Tuatagaloa DE	Linebackers (LB): 53 Leo Barker OLB; 57 Bernard Clark ILB; 50 James Francis OLB; 52 Craig Ogletree OLB; 59 Kevin Walker ILB; 51 Leon White OLB; 91 Carl Zander ILB; Defensive backs (DB): 24 Lewis Billups CB; 27 Barney Bussey S; 45 Carl Carter CB; 33 David Fulcher SS; 25 Rod Jones CB; 32 Mitchell Price; 22 Eric Thomas CB; 41 Solomon Wilcots FS; Special teams (ST): 55 Ed Brady LS; 3 Jim Breech K; 11 Lee Johnson P	Practice squad: 62 Eric Crigler G/T; Reserve: 74 Brian Blados G (IR); 29 Rickey Dixon S (IR); 88 Reggie Rembert WR (IR); 83 Kendal Smith WR (IR); 20 Craig Taylor RB (IR); 47 active, 5 inactive, 1 practice squad Rookies in italics

== Regular season ==
=== Schedule ===
Week	Date	Opponent	Result	Record	Venue	Recap
1	September 9	New York Jets	**W** 25–20	1–0	Riverfront Stadium	Recap
2	September 16	at San Diego Chargers	**W** 21–16	2–0	Jack Murphy Stadium	Recap
3	September 23	New England Patriots	**W** 41–7	3–0	Riverfront Stadium	Recap
4	October 1	at Seattle Seahawks	**L** 16–31	3–1	Kingdome	Recap
5	October 7	at Los Angeles Rams	**W** 34–31 (OT)	4–1	Anaheim Stadium	Recap
6	October 14	at **Houston Oilers**	**L** 17–48	4–2	Astrodome	Recap
7	October 22	at **Cleveland Browns**	**W** 34–13	5–2	Cleveland Stadium	Recap
8	October 28	at Atlanta Falcons	**L** 17–38	5–3	Atlanta–Fulton County Stadium	Recap
9	November 4	New Orleans Saints	**L** 7–21	5–4	Riverfront Stadium	Recap
10	Bye					
11	November 18	**Pittsburgh Steelers**	**W** 27–3	6–4	Riverfront Stadium	Recap
12	November 25	Indianapolis Colts	**L** 20–34	6–5	Riverfront Stadium	Recap
13	December 2	at **Pittsburgh Steelers**	**W** 16–12	7–5	Three Rivers Stadium	Recap
14	December 9	San Francisco 49ers	**L** 17–20 (OT)	7–6	Riverfront Stadium	Recap
15	December 16	at Los Angeles Raiders	**L** 7–24	7–7	Los Angeles Memorial Coliseum	Recap
16	December 23	**Houston Oilers**	**W** 40–20	8–7	Riverfront Stadium	Recap
17	December 30	**Cleveland Browns**	**W** 21–14	9–7	Riverfront Stadium	Recap
Note: Intra-division opponents are in **bold** text.

=== Game summaries ===
==== Week 1 vs Jets ====
Week One: New York Jets (0–0) at Cincinnati Bengals (0–0)

Quarter	1	2	3	4	Total
Jets	0	10	7	3	**20**
**Bengals**	0	3	7	15	**25**

at Riverfront Stadium, Cincinnati, Ohio

- Date: September 9
- Game time: 4:00 p.m.
- Game weather: 72 °F (22.2 °C)
- Game attendance: 56,467
- Referee: Dale Hamer
- TV announcers (NBC): Marv Albert and Paul Maguire
- Box Score, Box Score

Game information

**First quarter**

- No scoring

**Second quarter**

- CIN – Jim Breech 43-yard field goal, 14:52. Bengals 3–0.
- NYJ – Al Toon 46-yard pass from Ken O'Brien (Pat Leahy kick), 6:12. Jets 7–3.
- NYJ – Pat Leahy 33-yard field goal, 0:00. Jets 10–3.

**Third quarter**

- CIN – Eddie Brown 10-yard pass from Boomer Esiason (Jim Breech kick), 10:34. Tie 10–10.
- NYJ – Al Toon 9-yard pass from Ken O'Brien (Pat Leahy kick), 4:44. Jets 17–10.

**Fourth quarter**

- NYJ – Pat Leahy 26-yard field goal, 13:47. Jets 20–10.
- CIN – James Brooks 3-yard pass from Boomer Esiason (Jim Breech kick), 9:46. Jets 20–17.
- CIN – Safety, David Fulcher tackled Ken O'Brien in end zone, 8:59. Jets 20–19.
- CIN – Jim Breech 44-yard field goal, 4:46. Bengals 22–20.
- CIN – Jim Breech 37-yard field goal, 2:12. Bengals 25–20.

Top passers

- NYJ – Ken O'Brien – 27/49, 300 yards, TD, 2 int
- CIN – Boomer Esiason – 17/30, 202 yards, 2 TD, 2 int

Top rushers

- NYJ – Freeman McNeil – 7 rushes, 24 yards
  Brad Baxter – 5 rushes, 24 yards
- CIN – James Brooks – 15 rushes, 67 yards

Top receivers

- NYJ – Al Toon – 8 receptions, 118 yards, 2 TD
- CIN – Tim McGee – 6 receptions, 84 yards

==== Week 2 ====
Team	1	2	3	4	Total
• Bengals	0	14	0	7	21
Chargers	13	3	0	0	16

- Date: September 16
- Location: Jack Murphy Stadium, San Diego, California
- Game start: 1:00 p.m.
- Game weather: 70 °F (21.1 °C), wind 8 miles per hour (13 km/h; 7.0 kn)
- Referee: Red Cashion
- TV announcers (NBC): Dick Enberg and Bill Walsh

Scoring summary
1	SD	Ronnie Harmon 36 yard pass from Billy Joe Tolliver (Fuad Reveiz kick)	SD 7–0
1	SD	Joe Caravello 17 yard pass from Billy Joe Tolliver (kick failed)	SD 13–0
2	CIN	James Brooks 10 yard pass from Boomer Esiason (Jim Breech kick)	SD 13–7
2	SD	Fuad Reveiz 19 yard field goal	SD 16–7
2	CIN	Eddie Brown 30 yard pass from Boomer Esiason (Jim Breech kick)	SD 16–14
4	CIN	Eddie Brown 23 yard pass from Boomer Esiason (Jim Breech kick)	CIN 21–16

==== Week 13 ====
Team	1	2	3	4	Total
• Bengals	7	9	0	0	16
Steelers	6	0	3	3	12

- Date: December 2
- Location: Three Rivers Stadium, Pittsburgh, Pennsylvania
- Game start: 1:00 p.m.
- Game weather: 44 °F (6.7 °C); wind 7 miles per hour (11 km/h; 6.1 kn)
- Referee: Jerry Markbreit
- Television network: NBC

Scoring summary
Q1	PIT	Gary Anderson 32 yard field goal	PIT 3–0
Q1	CIN	Eddie Brown 50 yard pass from Boomer Esiason (Jim Breech kick)	CIN 7–3
Q1	PIT	Gary Anderson 36 yard field goal	CIN 7–6
Q2	CIN	Bubby Brister tackled by James Francis in end zone	CIN 9–6
Q2	CIN	James Brooks 7 yard run (Jim Breech kick)	CIN 16–6
Q3	PIT	Gary Anderson 29 yard field goal	CIN 16–9
Q4	PIT	Gary Anderson 48 yard field goal	CIN 16–12

==== Week 17 vs Browns ====
Week Sixteen: Cleveland Browns (3–12) at Cincinnati Bengals (8–7)

Quarter	1	2	3	4	Total
Browns	0	0	14	0	**14**
**Bengals**	0	14	0	7	**21**

at Riverfront Stadium, Cincinnati, Ohio

- Date: December 30
- Game time: 1:00 p.m. EST
- Game weather: 52 °F (11 °C)
- Game attendance: 60,041
- Referee: Gene Barth
- Pro-Football-Reference.com, The Football Database

Game information

**First quarter** No scoring **Second quarter**

- CIN – James Francis 17-yard interception return (Jim Breech kick), 7:10. Bengals 7–0.
- CIN – Rodney Holman 22-yard pass from Boomer Esiason (Jim Breech kick), 2:14. Bengals 14–0. Drive:

**Third quarter**

- CLE – Kevin Mack 2-yard run (Jerry Kauric kick), 13:36. Bengals 14–7. Drive:
- CLE – Brian Brennan 16-yard pass from Mike Pagel (Jerry Kauric kick), 10:28. Tie 14–14. Drive:

**Fourth quarter**

- CIN – Eric Ball 48-yard pass from Boomer Esiason (Jim Breech kick), 8:40. Bengals 21–14. Drive:

Top passers

- CLE – Mike Pagel – 14/32, 184 yards, TD, 3 int
- CIN – Boomer Esiason – 10/16, 154 yards, 2 TD, 2 int

Top rushers

- CLE – Kevin Mack – 16 rushes, 85 yards, TD
- CIN – James Brooks – 17 rushes, 84 yards

Top receivers

- CLE – Webster Slaughter – 6 receptions, 115 yards
- CIN – Eric Ball – 1 reception, 48 yards, TD

=== Standings ===
AFC Central
	W	L	T	PCT	DIV	CONF	PF	PA	STK
^{(3)} Cincinnati Bengals	9	7	0	.563	5–1	8–4	360	352	W2
^{(6)} Houston Oilers	9	7	0	.563	4–2	8–4	405	307	W1
Pittsburgh Steelers	9	7	0	.563	2–4	6–6	292	240	L1
Cleveland Browns	3	13	0	.188	1–5	2–10	228	462	L2

=== Best performances ===
- James Brooks, December 23, 1990, 201 rushing yards vs. Houston Oilers

== Playoffs ==
=== Schedule ===
Week	Date	Opponent (seed)	Result	Record	Venue	Venue
Wildcard	January 6, 1991	Houston Oilers (6)	W 41–14	1–0	Riverfront Stadium	60,012
Divisional	January 13, 1991	at Los Angeles Raiders (2)	L 10–20	1–1	Los Angeles Memorial Coliseum	92,045

== Team leaders ==
=== Passing ===
Player	Att	Comp	Yds	TD	INT	Rating
Boomer Esiason	402	224	3031	24	22	77.0

=== Rushing ===
Player	Att	Yds	YPC	Long	TD
James Brooks	195	1004	5.1	56	5
Ickey Woods	64	268	4.2	32	6

=== Receiving ===
Player	Rec	Yds	Avg	Long	TD
Eddie Brown	44	706	16.0	50	9

=== Defensive ===
Player	Tackles	Sacks	INTs	FF	FR
James Francis	76	8.0	1	2	0
Barney Bussey	57	2.0	4	0	1

=== Kicking and punting ===
Player	FGA	FGM	FG%	XPA	XPM	XP%	Points
Jim Breech	21	17	81.0%	44	41	93.2%	92

Player	Punts	Yards	Long	Blkd	Avg.
Lee Johnson	64	2705	70	0	42.3

=== Special teams ===
Player	KR	KRYards	KRAvg	KRLong	KRTD	PR	PRYards	PRAvg	PRLong	PRTD
Stanford Jennings	29	584	20.1	33	0	0	0	0.0	0	0
Mitchell Price	10	191	19.1	33	0	29	251	8.7	66	1

== Awards and records ==
=== All-Pros ===
- Anthony Muñoz LT, first-team All-Pro

=== All-Rookies ===
- James Francis OLB, PFWA All-Rookie Team

=== Records ===
- Boomer Esiason, franchise record, most passing yards in one game, 490 yards (achieved on October 7, 1990)

=== Milestones ===
- James Brooks, 1st 200 yard rushing game, December 23, 1990, 201 rushing yards vs. Houston Oilers
- James Brooks, 3rd 1000 yard rushing season (1,004 yards)
