= 1990–91 NFL playoffs =

American football tournament

- Dates: January 5–27, 1991
- Season: 1990
- Teams: 12
- Games played: 11
- Super Bowl XXV site: Tampa Stadium; Tampa, Florida
- Defending champions: San Francisco 49ers
- Champion: New York Giants (6th title)
- Runner-up: Buffalo Bills
- Conference runners-up: Los Angeles Raiders; San Francisco 49ers
NFL playoffs
← 1989–90	1991–92 →

The National Football League playoffs for the 1990 season began on January 5, 1991. The postseason tournament concluded with the New York Giants defeating the Buffalo Bills in an all-New York matchup in Super Bowl XXV, 20–19, on January 27, at Tampa Stadium in Tampa, Florida.

The league expanded its playoff system from a 10-team to a 12-team tournament, which remained in use through the 2019–20 NFL playoffs. With these changes, three wild card teams (those non-division champions with the conference's best won-lost-tied percentages) qualified from each conference, up from two the year before.

The format consisted of the following:

- The three division champions from each conference were seeded 1–3 based on their regular season won–lost–tied record.
- Three wild card qualifiers were seeded 4, 5, and 6 within the conference.

With the addition of the third wild card team, the lowest-seeded division winner would be guaranteed a home playoff game as they would host the lowest-seeded wild-card team in what was now the Wild Card Round; after the introduction of a second wild card team for 1978, all three division winners would receive a bye to the Divisional Playoffs, but the third-seeded team would have to play on the road against either the first or second seeded teams (this all depended on whether the Wild Card Game winner came from the same division as the top seed, as teams were not allowed to play wild card winners from their divisions) and could only host the conference championship game provided that they were the highest remaining seed.

The Divisional Playoffs did away with the previous rule that prohibited inter-divisional matchups. Instead, the lowest-seeded winner from the Wild Card Round would be paired against the top seed in one game, and the second seed would play the other winner with the highest remaining seed hosting the conference championship the following week.

In each conference, the matchup between the 3 and 6 seeds in the wild-card round dictated where the wild-card round winners traveled to for the divisional round:

- If the 3-seeded team won, they traveled to the 2-seeded team while the winner of the 4 vs. 5 matchup traveled to the 1-seeded team.
- If the 6-seeded team won, they traveled to the 1-seeded team while the winner of the 4 vs. 5 matchup traveled to the 2-seeded team.

This system was later modified before the 2002–03 NFL playoffs after the league realigned the teams into eight divisions (four per conference). The number of teams in the playoffs remained the same, but now there were four division champions and two wild card teams from each conference. This system was kept until 2020, when the third wild card team was restored, but only the top seed received a bye to the Divisional Playoffs in each conference.

As of the 2025–26 playoffs, this is the last postseason in which all division winners won a playoff game.

== Participants ==
Within each conference, the three division winners and the three non-division winners with the best overall regular season records qualified for the playoffs. The three division winners were seeded 1–3 based on the overall won-lost-tied record, and the three wild card teams were seeded 4–6. The NFL did not use a fixed bracket playoff system, and there were no restrictions regarding teams from the same division matching up in any round. In the first round, dubbed the wild-card playoffs or wild-card weekend, the third-seeded division winner hosted the sixth seed wild card, and the fourth seed hosted the fifth. The 1 and 2 seeds from each conference received a first-round bye. In the second round, the divisional playoffs, the number 1 seed hosted the worst-remaining seed from the first round (seed 4, 5, or 6), while the number 2 seed played the other team (seed 3, 4, or 5). The two winning teams from each conference's divisional playoff games then meet in the respective AFC and NFC Conference Championship games, hosted by the higher seed. Although the Super Bowl, the championship round of the playoffs, was played at a neutral site, the designated home team was based on an annual rotation by conference.

Playoff seeds
Seed	AFC	NFC
1	Buffalo Bills (East winner)	San Francisco 49ers (West winner)
2	Los Angeles Raiders (West winner)	New York Giants (East winner)
3	Cincinnati Bengals (Central winner)	Chicago Bears (Central winner)
4	Miami Dolphins (wild card)	Philadelphia Eagles (wild card)
5	Kansas City Chiefs (wild card)	Washington Redskins (wild card)
6	Houston Oilers (wild card)	New Orleans Saints (wild card)

== Bracket ==
Jan 6 – Riverfront Stadium	Jan 13 – Los Angeles Memorial Coliseum
6	Houston	14
3	Cincinnati	10
3	Cincinnati	41	Jan 20 – Rich Stadium
2	LA Raiders	20
AFC
Jan 5 – Joe Robbie Stadium	2	LA Raiders	3
Jan 12 – Rich Stadium
1	Buffalo	51
5	Kansas City	16	AFC Championship
4	Miami	34
4	Miami	17	Jan 27 – Tampa Stadium
1	Buffalo	44
Wild Card playoffs
Divisional playoffs
Jan 6 – Soldier Field	A1	Buffalo	19
Jan 13 – Giants Stadium
N2	NY Giants	20
6	New Orleans	6	Super Bowl XXV
3	Chicago	3
3	Chicago	16	Jan 20 – Candlestick Park
2	NY Giants	31
NFC
Jan 5 – Veterans Stadium	2	NY Giants	15
Jan 12 – Candlestick Park
1	San Francisco	13
5	Washington	20	NFC Championship
5	Washington	10
4	Philadelphia	6
1	San Francisco	28

== Schedule ==
With the expansion from a 10-team to a 12-team playoff system, "wild card Sunday" became "wild card Weekend", with two games played on Saturday and two on Sunday, similar to the Divisional playoffs. From Super Bowl XXV onward, all Super Bowls have since been scheduled for 6 p.m. EST or later, regardless of the local time zone, so the game runs into the primetime hours.

ABC was awarded the rights to broadcast the two Saturday wild-card playoff games. CBS then televised the rest of the NFC games and NBC broadcast the rest of the AFC playoff games. ABC also televised Super Bowl XXV.

Round	Away team	Score	Home team	Date	Kickoff (ET / UTC−5)	TV
Wild-card round	Washington Redskins	20–6	Philadelphia Eagles	January 5, 1991	12:30 p.m.	ABC
Wild-card round	Kansas City Chiefs	16–17	Miami Dolphins	January 5, 1991	4:00 p.m.	ABC
Wild-card round	Houston Oilers	14–41	Cincinnati Bengals	January 6, 1991	12:30 p.m.	NBC
Wild-card round	New Orleans Saints	6–16	Chicago Bears	January 6, 1991	4:00 p.m.	CBS
Divisional round	Miami Dolphins	34–44	Buffalo Bills	January 12, 1991	12:30 p.m.	NBC
Divisional round	Washington Redskins	10–28	San Francisco 49ers	January 12, 1991	4:00 p.m.	CBS
Divisional round	Chicago Bears	3–31	New York Giants	January 13, 1991	12:30 p.m.	CBS
Divisional round	Cincinnati Bengals	10–20	Los Angeles Raiders	January 13, 1991	4:00 p.m.	NBC
Conference championships	Los Angeles Raiders	3–51	Buffalo Bills	January 20, 1991	12:30 p.m.	NBC
Conference championships	New York Giants	15–13	San Francisco 49ers	January 20, 1991	4:00 p.m.	CBS
Super Bowl XXV Tampa Stadium Tampa, Florida	Buffalo Bills	19–20	New York Giants	January 27, 1991	6:20 p.m.	ABC

== Wild-card round ==
=== Saturday, January 5, 1991 ===
==== NFC: Washington Redskins 20, Philadelphia Eagles 6 ====
Washington Redskins vs. Philadelphia Eagles – Game summary

Quarter	1	2	3	4	Total
Redskins	0	10	10	0	20
Eagles	3	3	0	0	6

at Veterans Stadium, Philadelphia, Pennsylvania

- Game time: 12:30 p.m. EST
- Game weather: 31 °F (−1 °C), clear
- Game attendance: 65,287
- Referee: Gene Barth
- TV announcers (ABC): Brent Musburger (play-by-play) and Dick Vermeil (color commentator)

Game information

First quarter

- PHI – Roger Ruzek 37-yard field goal. Eagles 3–0.

Second quarter

- PHI – Roger Ruzek 28-yard field goal. Eagles 6–0.
- WAS – Art Monk 16-yard pass from Mark Rypien (Chip Lohmiller kick). Redskins 7–6.
- WAS – Chip Lohmiller 20-yard field goal. Redskins 10–6.

Third quarter

- WAS – Chip Lohmiller 19-yard field goal. Redskins 13–6.
- WAS – Gary Clark 2-yard pass from Mark Rypien (Chip Lohmiller kick). Redskins 20–6.

Fourth quarter

- No scoring plays.

Top passers

- WAS – Mark Rypien – 15/31, 206 yards, 2 TD, INT
- PHI – Randall Cunningham – 15/29, 205 yards, INT

Top rushers

- WAS – Earnest Byner – 18 rushes, 49 yards
- PHI – Randall Cunningham – 7 rushes, 80 yards

Top receivers

- WAS – Earnest Byner – 7 receptions, 77 yards
- PHI – Keith Jackson – 5 receptions, 116 yards

The Redskins overcame losing two turnovers and a 6–0 deficit to score 20 unanswered points. This game was sweet revenge for the Redskins, who had lost to the Eagles 28–14 in a Monday night game during the season in which the Eagles defense had scored two touchdowns and knocked nine Washington players out of the game, including all of their quarterbacks. The game has become known as the "Body Bag Game" because the Eagles defense had taunted the Redskins by asking if they had enough body bags for their team.

Philadelphia started the game strong as quarterback Randall Cunningham completed a 66-yard pass to tight end Keith Jackson on their third play from scrimmage, giving the team a first down at the Redskins 11-yard line. However, the next three plays resulted in a 1-yard run, an incomplete pass, and a 10-yard sack by Washington linebacker Monte Coleman, forcing the Eagles to settle for a 37-yard field goal by Roger Ruzek. After a pair of punts by each team, the Redskins got the ball on their 21 yard line with 14:23 remaining in the second quarter. Running back Gerald Riggs lost the ball due to a tackle by Seth Joyner, and safety Wes Hopkins recovered it on the Redskins 25. A few plays later, a defensive holding penalty against the Redskins gave Philadelphia a first down on the 2-yard line, but they still could not get into the end zone. First, Washington defender Markus Koch tackled Heath Sherman for a 1-yard loss. Cunningham tried to pass the ball on the next two plays, but his first attempt was incomplete, and on his second try, he was sacked for an 8-yard loss by defensive tackle Charles Mann. Ruzek then kicked a 28-yard field goal to give Philadelphia a 6–0 lead just under five minutes into the second quarter.

Eagles cornerback Eric Allen ended Washington's possession by intercepting a pass from Mark Rypien on their 46. But in what turned out to be a critical defensive stand, the Eagles could not move the ball and had to punt. From this point on, Washington took over the game. Faced with third and 9 on his own 33-yard line, Rypien completed a 28-yard pass to receiver Art Monk, and followed it up with a 23-yard completion to running back Earnest Byner. On the next play, his 16-yard touchdown pass to Monk gave the Redskins a 7–6 lead with 5:54 left in the half. Alvin Walton recovered a fumble from Sherman to end the Eagles next drive. Philadelphia's defense forced a punt, but their next drive fared no better as Cunningham was intercepted by Darrell Green at midfield. A few plays later, Byner lost a fumble that turned into a 94-yard touchdown return by cornerback Ben Smith. It seemed to be a repeat of Byner's infamous play known as "The Fumble" in the 1987 AFC Championship Game, but this time it was overturned by instant replay (George Sladky), as replays showed Byner was down by contact before the ball came out. Washington kept possession and ended up increasing their lead to 10–6 on a 20-yard Chip Lohmiller field goal.

Washington increased their lead to 13–6 late in the third quarter with a 19-yard field goal by Lohmiller. At this point, Cunningham was benched and replaced by Jim McMahon, who promptly threw three straight incompletions before Brian Mitchell returned their punt to the Redskins 45-yard line. Rypien subsequently completed a 47-yard pass to Gary Clark on third and 5, and then hit him with a 3-yard touchdown pass two plays later, increasing Washington's lead to 20–6. Cunningham would return to the starting lineup on the next series, but could not lead the Eagles to any more points.

Rypien finished his first playoff game completing 15 of 31 passes for 206 yards and two touchdowns, with one interception. Cunningham completed 15 of 29 passes for 205 yards with one interception. He was also the game's leading rusher with 80 yards, but was sacked five times. Jackson was the top receiver of the game with five receptions for 116 yards.

This was the last game for Eagles head coach Buddy Ryan as he was fired shortly after this game. He failed to reach the playoffs in his next head-coaching job with the Arizona Cardinals and was fired after two seasons, thus failing to win a playoff game as a head coach.

The two teams would meet again in the 2024 NFC Championship game with the eagles winning 55-23 This was the first postseason meeting between the Redskins and Eagles.

==== AFC: Miami Dolphins 17, Kansas City Chiefs 16 ====
Kansas City Chiefs vs. Miami Dolphins – Game summary

Quarter	1	2	3	4	Total
Chiefs	3	7	6	0	16
Dolphins	0	3	0	14	17

at Joe Robbie Stadium, Miami, Florida

- Game time: 4:00 p.m. EST
- Game weather: 75 °F (24 °C), cloudy
- Game attendance: 67,276
- Referee: Pat Haggerty
- TV announcers (ABC): Al Michaels (play-by-play), Frank Gifford, and Dan Dierdorf (color commentators)
- Recap, Game Book

Game information

First quarter

- KC – Nick Lowery 27-yard field goal. Chiefs 3–0.

Second quarter

- MIA – Pete Stoyanovich 58-yard field goal. Tied 3–3.
- KC – Stephone Paige 26-yard pass from Steve DeBerg (Nick Lowery kick). Chiefs 10–3.

Third quarter

- KC – Nick Lowery 25-yard field goal. Chiefs 13–3.
- KC – Nick Lowery 38-yard field goal. Chiefs 16–3.

Fourth quarter

- MIA – Tony Paige 1-yard pass from Dan Marino (Pete Stoyanovich kick). Chiefs 16–10.
- MIA – Mark Clayton 12-yard pass from Dan Marino (Pete Stoyanovich kick). Dolphins 17–16.

Top passers

- KC – Steve DeBerg – 17/30, 269 yards, TD, INT
- MIA – Dan Marino – 19/30, 221 yards, 2 TD

Top rushers

- KC – Christian Okoye – 13 rushes, 83 yards
- MIA – Sammie Smith – 20 rushes, 82 yards

Top receivers

- KC – Stephone Paige – 8 receptions, 142 yards, TD
- MIA – Mark Clayton – 5 receptions, 66 yards, TD

With 3:28 left in the game, the Dolphins capped an 85-yard drive with quarterback Dan Marino's winning 12-yard touchdown pass to wide receiver Mark Clayton.

On the Dolphins opening drive they reached midfield, but Marino was sacked on third down and Reggie Roby's punt was blocked by Charles Washington, giving the Chiefs the ball at the Miami 37-yard line. After nine plays and a 28-yard gain, the Chiefs scored on a 27-yard field goal from Nick Lowery. Miami responded with a 40-yard drive, with Marino completing a 12-yard pass to Mark Duper on third down and four yards needed to keep it moving. The drive ended on the Chiefs 40-yard line, where Pete Stoyanovich made an NFL playoff record 58-yard field goal to tie the game.

The Chiefs responded with a drive to the Dolphins 30-yard line, featuring a 33-yard reception by receiver Stephone Paige, but it ended with no points when safety Jarvis Williams intercepted a pass from Steve DeBerg. After an exchange of punts, Miami drove to the Chiefs 39-yard line. Stoyanovich attempted another long field goal, this one 57 yards, but this time he missed and the Chiefs got rolling with a 16-yard run from Christian Okoye. Then DeBerg got his team into the end zone with two completions to Paige, the first for 16 yards and the second a 26-yard touchdown to make the score 10–3. Miami later threatened to score with a drive in the Chiefs territory, but Neil Smith forced a fumble from Marino and J. C. Pearson recovered it, keeping the score 10–3 at halftime.

The Chiefs had to punt on their first drive, and Bryan Barker's 44-yard kick pinned the Dolphins back at their own 6-yard line. Miami was forced to a three and out, but Roby's 64-yard punt sent the Chiefs all the way back to their own 30. DeBerg started off the possession with a 26-yard completion to Emile Harry. Following a sack and an incompletion, the Chiefs faced third and 15. On the next play, running back Todd McNair picked up 13 yards on a screen pass, and on fourth down and 2 from the Dolphins 36, Okoye rushed five yards for a first down. Two more DeBerg completions advanced the ball to the 1-yard line, but an intentional grounding penalty moved the ball back 10 yards and the Chiefs ended up settling for a 25-yard field goal from Lowery. Then on the first play of the Dolphins next drive, Duper lost a fumble while being tackled by Deron Cherry, and Dino Hackett recovered for the Chiefs on the Miami 29-yard line. Three runs by Okoye gained eight yards, and then Lowery kicked his third field goal to give his team a 16–3 lead.

Miami fought back with a 66-yard, 10-play touchdown drive. On the last play of the third quarter, Sammie Smith converted a fourth down with a 2-yard run. Then Marino connected with Mark Clayton for a 23-yard gain, setting up his 1-yard touchdown pass to Tony Paige that cut the deficit to six points with 12 minutes left. DeBerg responded with a 33-yard completion to Harry on the first play of the Chiefs ensuing drive, but it stalled on the Dolphins 41-yard line and Barker had to punt it away, giving the Dolphins the ball at their own 15 where Marino led his team 85 yards for the game winning score, starting with a 37-yard completion to tight end Ferrell Edmunds. After 10 plays and three third down conversions, Marino finished the drive with a 12-yard touchdown pass to Clayton, giving Miami a 17–16 lead with 3:28 left in the game.

The Chiefs took the ball back and fought hard for a winning field goal, driving into Dolphins territory where Okoye's 26-yard burst moved the ball to the 26-yard line. But on the next play, a holding call wiped out his 12-yard run and pushed the team back 10 yards. As the final seconds of the game approached, the Chiefs could only make it back to the 34. Lowery, who had made his last 22 field goals, attempted a game winner from 52 yards out, but it fell just short.

Marino finished the game with 19 of 30 completions for 221 yards and two touchdowns. Stephone Paige caught eight passes for 142 yards and a score.

This was the second postseason meeting between the Chiefs and Dolphins. Miami won the only previous meeting.

Previous playoff games
Miami leads 1–0 in all-time playoff games

1971

Miami Dolphins 27 @ Kansas City Chiefs 24 (2OT)

1971 AFC divisional playoffs

=== Sunday, January 6, 1991 ===
==== AFC: Cincinnati Bengals 41, Houston Oilers 14 ====
Houston Oilers vs. Cincinnati Bengals – Game summary

Quarter	1	2	3	4	Total
Oilers	0	0	7	7	14
Bengals	10	10	14	7	41

at Riverfront Stadium, Cincinnati, Ohio

- Game time: 12:30 p.m. EST
- Game weather: 40 °F (4 °C), rain
- Game attendance: 60,012
- Referee: Dale Hamer
- TV announcers (NBC): Don Criqui (play-by-play) and Bob Trumpy (color commentator)

Game information

First quarter

- CIN – Ickey Woods 1-yard run (Jim Breech kick). Bengals 7–0.
- CIN – Jim Breech 27-yard field goal. Bengals 10–0.

Second quarter

- CIN – Harold Green 2-yard pass from Boomer Esiason (Jim Breech kick). Bengals 17–0.
- CIN – Jim Breech 30-yard field goal. Bengals 20–0.

Third quarter

- CIN – Eric Ball 3-yard run (Jim Breech kick). Bengals 27–0.
- CIN – Boomer Esiason 10-yard run (Jim Breech kick). Bengals 34–0.
- HOU – Ernest Givins 16-yard pass from Cody Carlson (Teddy Garcia kick). Bengals 34–7.

Fourth quarter

- CIN – Eric Kattus 9-yard pass from Boomer Esiason (Jim Breech kick). Bengals 41–7.
- HOU – Ernest Givins 5-yard pass from Cody Carlson (Teddy Garcia kick). Bengals 41–14.

Top passers

- HOU – Cody Carlson – 16/33, 165 yards, 2 TD, INT
- CIN – Boomer Esiason – 14/20, 150 yards, 2 TD

Top rushers

- HOU – Allen Pinkett – 5 rushes, 43 yards
- CIN – Boomer Esiason – 5 rushes, 57 yards, TD

Top receivers

- HOU – Ernest Givins – 6 receptions, 60 yards, 2 TD
- CIN – Rodney Holman – 2 receptions, 51 yards

Riverfront Stadium continued to be a house of horrors for the Oilers, who had lost in 9 of their last 10 trips to the Queen City and had given up 44, 61 (a Bengals team record) and 40 points in their last 3 visits. Not only had they lost their previous meeting with the Bengals, a 40–20 defeat in week 16, but they also lost starting quarterback Warren Moon, who suffered a dislocated thumb in the game.

Despite losing starting running back James Brooks to injury in the first quarter (coincidentally the same injury that sidelined Moon, a dislocated thumb), the Bengals crushed the Oilers by jumping to a 34–0 lead in the third quarter and holding the ball for 39:45. On the opening drive, they advanced 70 yards in 11 plays, including a 46-yard completion from Boomer Esiason to tight end Rodney Holman, to score on a 1-yard run by fullback Ickey Woods. Then after forcing a punt, Esiason completed passes to Tim McGee and Harold Green for gains of 19 and 13 yards, while Brooks rushed for a 14-yard gain as the team drove to a 10–0 lead on Jim Breech's 27-yard field goal with just over 1 minute left in the first quarter.

Early in the second quarter, Bengals safety David Fulcher intercepted a pass from Cody Carlson and returned it 43 yards to the Oilers' 16-yard line, setting up Esiason's 2-yard touchdown toss to Green. The next time Cincinnati got the ball, they drove 75 yards to another Breech field goal to give the team a 20–0 lead going into halftime. Houston finished the first half with one first down and 36 yards, while Cincinnati gained 15 first downs, 222 yards, and 20 points.

Houston had to punt on the first drive of the second half, and Mitchell Price returned Greg Montgomery's 47-yard kick 34 yards to the Oilers' 34-yard line. The Bengals then drove to another score, with Esiason rushing for 27 yards on a scramble before running back Eric Ball finished the drive with a 3-yard touchdown run. Less than a minute later, Carlson fumbled a snap, which linebacker James Francis recovered for Cincinnati on the Oilers 10-yard line. Esiason ran the ball into the end zone on the next play, giving the Bengals a 34–0 lead after just 3:51 had elapsed in the third quarter. This time, Houston was able to respond, driving 80 yards to score on Carlson's 16-yard touchdown pass to Ernest Givins, making the score 34–7. With 14 minutes left in the final quarter, Cincinnati scored another touchdown on Esiason's 9-yard pass to tight end Eric Kattus, while Givins caught another touchdown pass from Carlson to make the final score 41–14.

Esiason finished the game with 14 of 20 completions for 150 yards and two touchdowns, while also running for 57 yards and a score. Cincinnati's most lopsided playoff win in franchise history was the result of a team effort. The Bengals racked up 187 yards on the ground even though no player rushed for more than 57 yards, and added another 162 yards through the air, though no one caught more than two passes. Overall, the Bengals gained 349 yards while holding Houston to 227, with just 69 rushing yards. Ironically, Houston had helped get Cincinnati into the playoffs by defeating the Pittsburgh Steelers in their final game of the season, causing the Bengals to win the AFC Central based on tiebreaker rules.

This win was the last one in Sam Wyche's career and the last playoff win for the Bengals until the 2021 season. The next season, the Bengals fell to 3–13 and began a streak of fourteen consecutive non-winning seasons.

This was the first postseason meeting between the Oilers and Bengals.

==== NFC: Chicago Bears 16, New Orleans Saints 6 ====
New Orleans Saints vs. Chicago Bears – Game summary

Quarter	1	2	3	4	Total
Saints	0	3	0	3	6
Bears	3	7	3	3	16

at Soldier Field, Chicago, Illinois

- Game time: 4:00 p.m. EST/3:00 p.m. CST
- Game weather: 22 °F (−6 °C), partly cloudy
- Game attendance: 60,767
- Referee: Jerry Seeman
- TV announcers (CBS): Verne Lundquist (play-by-play) and John Madden (color commentator)

Game information

First quarter

- CHI – Kevin Butler 19-yard field goal. Bears 3–0.

Second quarter

- CHI – James Thornton 18-yard pass from Mike Tomczak (Kevin Butler kick). Bears 10–0.
- NO – Morten Andersen 47-yard field goal. Bears 10–3.

Third quarter

- CHI – Kevin Butler 22-yard field goal. Bears 13–3.
- NO – Morten Andersen 38-yard field goal. Bears 13–6.

Fourth quarter

- CHI – Kevin Butler 21-yard field goal. Bears 16–6.

Top passers

- NO – John Fourcade – 5/18, 79 yards, 2 INT
- CHI – Mike Tomczak – 12/25, 166 yards, TD

Top rushers

- NO – Gill Fenerty – 8 rushes, 29 yards
- CHI – Neal Anderson – 27 rushes, 102 yards

Top receivers

- NO – Eric Martin – 2 receptions, 47 yards
- CHI – James Thornton – 2 receptions, 43 yards, TD

The Bears defense held the Saints to 193 total yards, 65 rushing yards, six first downs, and two field goals. Chicago also recorded 365 yards of total offense. Bears running back Neal Anderson compiled 102 rushing yards, 42 receiving yards, and threw a 22-yard halfback option pass.

The score was 10–3 at the end of the first half, due to a Kevin Butler field goal and Mike Tomczak's 18-yard touchdown pass to tight end James Thornton. The Saints' only score of the half was a 47-yard field goal by Morten Andersen, who would later miss from 41 yards and have another attempt blocked. Also, with three minutes left before halftime, New Orleans starting quarterback Steve Walsh, who had completed just six of 16 passes, was knocked out of the game and replaced by John Fourcade. Fourcade fared no better, completing just five of 18 passes for 79 yards, including two interceptions.

Still the Saints were just trailing 10–3 near the end of the third quarter, and had a great chance to tie the game when defensive tackle Renaldo Turnbull blocked Butler's 45-yard field goal attempt. New Orleans defensive end Vince Buck recovered the ball and returned it 62 yards for a potential touchdown, only to see the play wiped out by an offsides penalty on teammate Robert Massey, who had lined up with his hand over the neutral zone. The penalty not only eliminated the score, but it also gave Chicago a first down, and seven plays later, Butler kicked a 25-yard field goal to put them up 13–3.

With 5:52 left in the fourth quarter, Andersen's 38-yard field goal brought the scoring difference back to just a touchdown at 13–6. However, when faced with third and 11 on the Bears ensuing drive, Tomczak completed a 38-yard pass to Dennis Gentry, enabling Chicago to maintain possession and drive to Butler's game-clinching 21-yard field goal with 2:47 remaining on the clock.

"You just try to line up as close as you can; I didn't realize I was offside", said Massey about his critical penalty after the game. "But when I saw the flag, I said, 'Oh, God!' I knew it was me."

It was Mike Ditka's last playoff win as Bears head coach.

This was the first postseason meeting between the Saints and Bears.

== Divisional round ==
=== Saturday, January 12, 1991 ===
==== AFC: Buffalo Bills 44, Miami Dolphins 34 ====
Miami Dolphins vs. Buffalo Bills – Game summary

Quarter	1	2	3	4	Total
Dolphins	3	14	3	14	34
Bills	13	14	3	14	44

at Rich Stadium, Orchard Park, New York

- Game time: 12:30 p.m. EST
- Game weather: 31 °F (−1 °C), rain and snow
- Game attendance: 77,087
- Referee: Bob McElwee
- TV announcers (NBC): Marv Albert (play-by-play) and Paul Maguire (color commentator)

Game information

First quarter

- BUF – Andre Reed 40-yard pass from Jim Kelly (Scott Norwood kick). Bills 7–0.
- MIA – Pete Stoyanovich 49-yard field goal. Bills 7–3.
- BUF – Scott Norwood 24-yard field goal. Bills 10–3.
- BUF – Scott Norwood 22-yard field goal. Bills 13–3.

Second quarter

- BUF – Thurman Thomas 5-yard run (Scott Norwood kick). Bills 20–3.
- MIA – Mark Duper 64-yard pass from Dan Marino (Pete Stoyanovich kick). Bills 20–10.
- BUF – James Lofton 13-yard pass from Jim Kelly (Scott Norwood kick). Bills 27–10.
- MIA – Dan Marino 2-yard run (Pete Stoyanovich kick). Bills 27–17.

Third quarter

- MIA – Pete Stoyanovich 22-yard field goal. Bills 27–20.
- BUF – Scott Norwood 28-yard field goal. Bills 30–20.

Fourth quarter

- MIA – Roy Foster 2-yard pass from Dan Marino (Pete Stoyanovich kick). Bills 30–27.
- BUF – Thurman Thomas 5-yard run (Scott Norwood kick). Bills 37–27.
- BUF – Andre Reed 26-yard pass from Jim Kelly (Scott Norwood kick). Bills 44–27.
- MIA – Tony Martin 8-yard pass from Dan Marino (Pete Stoyanovich kick). Bills 44–34.

Top passers

- MIA – Dan Marino – 23/49, 323 yards, 3 TD, 2 INT
- BUF – Jim Kelly – 19/29, 339 yards, 3 TD, INT

Top rushers

- MIA – Sammie Smith – 15 rushes, 65 yards
- BUF – Thurman Thomas – 32 rushes, 117 yards, 2 TD

Top receivers

- MIA – Mark Duper – 3 receptions, 113 yards, TD
- BUF – James Lofton – 7 receptions, 149 yards, TD

In a shootout, the Bills jumped to a 20–3 lead in the first half, and kept pace with the Dolphins as the two teams matched each other score for score for the rest of the game. By the end, both teams finished even in first downs (24) and nearly even in total yards (493 for Buffalo, 430 for Miami). Ultimately, Miami's three turnovers to the Bills' two would make the key difference.

The Bills took the opening kickoff and scored with a typical fast-paced drive, moving the ball 76 yards in five plays. Running back Thurman Thomas rushed for 14 yards and caught a pass for 20, while Jim Kelly finished it off with a 40-yard touchdown pass to receiver Andre Reed. Aided by three Bills penalties, the Dolphins responded with a 40-yard drive that ended on Pete Stoyanovich's 49-yard field goal, cutting their deficit to 7–3. The Bills struck back with Kelly's 44-yard completion to James Lofton setting up a 24-yard Scott Norwood field goal, retaking their 7-point lead at 10–3. On the next series, Miami quarterback Dan Marino threw a pass that was tipped by Darryl Talley and intercepted by Nate Odomes, who returned the ball nine yards to the Dolphins 38. Faced with third and 8 on their ensuing possession, Kelly took off for a 16-yard gain. He fumbled at the end, but center Kent Hull recovered the ball for a first down on the 18-yard line. Norwood completed the drive with his second field goal, this one from 22 yards, upping the lead to 13–3.

The Dolphins had to punt early in the second quarter at the end of their next drive, once again forcing their defense to deal with the terror of Kelly, Thomas, and Reed. This time the three players would combine for 67 yards as Thomas rushed twice for eight and caught an 11-yard pass before Kelly's 43-yard completion to Reed brought up first and goal on the Miami 5-yard line. Thomas ran it across the goal line from there, giving the Bills a 20–3 lead. But on this occasion the Dolphins were ready to respond as Marino completed an 11-yard pass to Mark Duper on third and 5, and then hooked up with him again for a 64-yard touchdown completion that cut the score to 20–10. Not to be outdone, Kelly led the Bills back on a 68-yard scoring drive, starting with a 19-yard pass to Lofton on the first play and a 9-yard run on the next. Later in the drive, he kept it going with a 13-yard pass to Reed on fourth and 3 from the Dolphins 32, and eventually finished it off with a 7-yard touchdown toss to Lofton. With Norwood's extra point, the Bills were up by 17 at 27–10 with five minutes left in the half.

The game seemed to be slipping away from Miami, particularly as they were forced to punt on their next possession and receiver Al Edwards returned the ball 17 yards. However, Edwards lost a fumble on the runback, which punter Reggie Roby recovered on the Bills 47. The Dolphins then made another big play when Marino completed a 38-yard pass to Duper on fourth down and 5 from the 42, and with just 27 seconds left on the clock, Marino scored on a 2-yard touchdown run, cutting the deficit to 27–17 at halftime.

Miami continued to whittle away the Bills lead in the third quarter with an 8-play, 62-yard scoring drive, featuring a 17-yard run by Sammie Smith on third and 2. Stoyanovich finished the drive with a 22-yard field goal that cut their deficit down to one score, 27–20. Buffalo responded with a drive to the Dolphins 27, but this time their defense was up to the task and Kelly was intercepted by safety Jarvis Williams on the 2. However, Miami could not pick up a first down pinned deep in their own territory. Marino tried to go deep on third down, but Bills safety Mark Kelso picked him off at the Dolphins 48, leading to a 28-yard Norwood field goal that gave the Bills a 30–20 lead.

Dolphins running back Marc Logan returned the ensuing kickoff 30 yards to the Dolphins 43, and Marino completed a 23-yard pass to Mark Clayton on the next play. Then Smith ran twice for 18, bringing up first down on the Bills 13-yard line. Miami was on a roll and didn't stop until Marino completed the drive with a 2-yard touchdown pass to guard Roy Foster, who had checked in as an eligible receiver. His touchdown brought Miami back within three points less than two minutes into the fourth quarter. However, their comeback hopes were swiftly snuffed out by the Bills offense, who stormed back 63 yards in 10 plays, including Kelly's 5-yard completion to tight end Keith McKeller on fourth and 2, and retook a 10-point lead with Thomas' 5-yard touchdown run. Then linebacker Hal Garner forced a fumble from Logan on the ensuing kickoff, which Norwood recovered for Buffalo on the Dolphins 29. Two plays later, Kelly essentially put the game away with a 26-yard touchdown pass to Reed, giving the Bills a 44–27 lead with 9:42 left in regulation. Miami still tried to fight back, driving to the Bills 35, but lost the ball as Marino threw four straight incompletions. Following a Bills punt, Miami drove 91 yards in 15 plays to score on Marino's 8-yard pass to receiver Tony Martin, but by then only 1:15 was left on the clock. The Bills recovered Miami's onside kick attempt and went on to win, 44–34.

Kelly, who returned to start for the Bills after missing the last two games of the season with a knee injury, passed for 339 yards and three touchdowns, while also rushing for 37 yards. Reed was also a big factor, recording 123 receiving yards and a pair of touchdown catches. Lofton caught seven passes for 149 yards and a touchdown. Thomas led the Bills ground attack with 32 carries for 117 rushing yards and two touchdowns, while also catching three passes for 38 yards. Marino threw for 323 yards and three touchdowns, but was intercepted twice. Duper caught three passes for 113 yards and a touchdown. Running back Sammie Smith rushed for 99 yards and caught a 9-yard reception.

"It was lick-your-chops time", exclaimed Reed after the game. "I'll tell you, a lot of times he (Louis Oliver, who had five interceptions during the season) played off the line. And if the field would have been dry, I would have had 300 yards in catches."

This was the first postseason meeting between the Dolphins and Bills.

==== NFC: San Francisco 49ers 28, Washington Redskins 10 ====
Washington Redskins vs. San Francisco 49ers – Game summary

Quarter	1	2	3	4	Total
Redskins	10	0	0	0	10
49ers	7	14	0	7	28

at Candlestick Park, San Francisco, California

- Game time: 4:00 p.m. EST/1:00 p.m. PST
- Game weather: 51 °F (11 °C), light rain
- Game attendance: 65,292
- Referee: Red Cashion
- TV announcers (CBS): Dick Stockton (play-by-play) and Merlin Olsen (color commentator)

Game information

First quarter

- WAS – Art Monk 31-yard pass from Mark Rypien (Chip Lohmiller kick). Redskins 7–0.
- SF – Tom Rathman 1-yard run (Mike Cofer kick). Tied 7–7.
- WAS – Chip Lohmiller 44-yard field goal. Redskins 10–7.

Second quarter

- SF – Jerry Rice 10-yard pass from Joe Montana (Mike Cofer kick). 49ers 14–10.
- SF – Mike Sherrard 8-yard pass from Joe Montana (Mike Cofer kick). 49ers 21–10.

Third quarter

- No scoring plays.

Fourth quarter

- SF – Michael Carter 61-yard interception return (Mike Cofer kick). 49ers 28–10.

Top passers

- WAS – Mark Rypien – 27/48, 361 yards, TD, 3 INT
- SF – Joe Montana – 22/31, 274 yards, 2 TD, INT

Top rushers

- WAS – Earnest Byner – 12 rushes, 51 yards
- SF – Roger Craig – 12 rushes, 20 yards

Top receivers

- WAS – Art Monk – 10 receptions, 163 yards
- SF – Brent Jones – 4 receptions, 103 yards

Although Washington outgained the 49ers in total yards 441 to 338, they were unable to overcome quarterback Mark Rypien's three interceptions, several controversial ref calls that went against them, as well as the performance of Joe Montana, who passed for 200 yards and two touchdowns in the first half.

The Redskins opened up the scoring with an 8-play, 78-yard drive that culminated in Rypien's 31-yard touchdown completion to receiver Art Monk. San Francisco struck back by driving 74 yards in eight plays to tie the game on a 1-yard touchdown run by fullback Tom Rathman. A key play of the drive was an unnecessary roughness call against Redskins cornerback Darrell Green for throwing Jerry Rice to the ground during a tackle, turning Rice's reception into a 25-yard gain. Green was stunned by the penalty, stating he didn't realize the call was against him until he made his way to the sidelines. Near the end of the quarter, Redskins kicker Chip Lohmiller made a 44-yard field goal that put Washington back in front at 10–7.

Montana quickly rallied the 49ers back in the second quarter, leading them on an 80-yard scoring drive that saw San Francisco fool Washington with a halfback option play in which running back Harry Sydney completed a 28-yard pass to tight end Brent Jones. On the last play of the drive, Montana fired a 10-yard pass to Rice in the end zone, who caught the ball between two defenders to retake the lead for San Francisco at 14–10. The team was aided by another controversial call on the drive; Jones caught his 47-yard reception in the air and landed with a foot out of bounds, but officials ruled he had been forced out in the air by safety Alvin Walton. At the time, a reception made by a player forced out of bounds still counted as a catch. This rule was changed in 2008. Then after a punt, Montana again went to work, completing a 32-yard pass to halfback Roger Craig and a 47-yarder to Jones before finishing off the 89-yard possession with an 8-yard scoring toss to Mike Sherrard.

Sherrard's touchdown made the score 21–10 going into halftime, and it turned out to be the final score of the day for the offenses of both teams. Washington advanced inside the 49ers' 15-yard line three times in the second half, but failed to score on all of them. On their second possession of the half, they advanced 66 yards to the 49ers' 7-yard line before Johnnie Jackson picked off a third down pass intended for Monk in the end zone. Early in the fourth quarter, Monk caught three passes for 63 yards on a drive to the San Francisco 15, only to see Rypien get hit as he threw a pass, which floated right into the hands of cornerback Darryl Pollard. Linebacker Monte Coleman quickly gave the Redskins another chance to get back in the game, intercepting a pass from Montana and returning it 18 yards to the 49ers 19-yard line with 10:28 left in regulation. Faced with fourth down and 5 from the 14, Rypien threw the ball to receiver Gary Clark in the end zone. Eric Davis seemed to make contact with Clark before the ball arrived, but no flag was thrown and the pass fell incomplete, causing a turnover on downs. In the closing minutes of the game, 49ers linebacker Charles Haley deflected a pass from Rypien into the arms of 295-pound defensive tackle Michael Carter, who rumbled 61 yards to the end zone to make the final score 28–10.

"I just couldn't believe there was no flag," Clark said after the game, in reference to Davis' contact with him. "I mean, I just assumed it would be thrown. When I heard the crowd cheering, I gave the ref an earful. I'm not saying that cost us the game. I don't think any of the calls would have changed anything because the 49ers have a better team. But there were some calls out there we should have had." "I'm not going to walk out of here crying," Redskins coach Joe Gibbs added. "We got beat fair and square. I did think there were some things called wrong. Rice outweighs Darrell Green by 20 pounds and gets 15 yards (for Green's flinging tackle). That's hard to understand." Rypien added "I don't think the score was any indication of how the game was played. We have nothing to be ashamed about other than the score. You look at 28–10 and it looks like they pretty much handled us, but all of you that watched the game know that it's a different story. We had our chances. We had our shots. We just didn't make the plays we had to."

Rypien finished the game 27/48 for 361 yards and a touchdown, but was intercepted three times. Monk had 10 receptions for 163 yards and a score. Montana finished the day 22/31 for 274 yards and two touchdowns, with one interception. His top receiver was Jones, who caught four passes for 103 yards.

This was the third postseason meeting between the Redskins and 49ers. The teams split the previous two meetings.

Previous playoff games
Tied 1–1 in all-time playoff games

1971

Washington Redskins 20 @ San Francisco 49ers 24

1971 NFC divisional playoffs

1983

San Francisco 49ers 21 @ Washington Redskins 24

1983 NFC championship game

=== Sunday, January 13, 1991 ===
==== NFC: New York Giants 31, Chicago Bears 3 ====
Chicago Bears vs. New York Giants – Game summary

Quarter	1	2	3	4	Total
Bears	0	3	0	0	3
Giants	10	7	7	7	31

at Giants Stadium, East Rutherford, New Jersey

- Game time: 12:30 p.m. EST
- Game weather: 32 °F (0 °C), partly cloudy
- Game attendance: 77,025
- Referee: Dick Hantak
- TV announcers (CBS): Pat Summerall (play-by-play) and John Madden (color commentator)

Game information

First quarter

- NYG – Matt Bahr 46-yard field goal. Giants 3–0.
- NYG – Stephen Baker 21-yard pass from Jeff Hostetler (Matt Bahr kick). Giants 10–0.

Second quarter

- CHI – Kevin Butler 33-yard field goal. Giants 10–3.
- NYG – Howard Cross 3-yard pass from Jeff Hostetler (Matt Bahr kick). Giants 17–3.

Third quarter

- NYG – Jeff Hostetler 3-yard run (Matt Bahr kick). Giants 24–3.

Fourth quarter

- NYG – Maurice Carthon 1-yard run (Matt Bahr kick). Giants 31–3.

Top passers

- CHI – Mike Tomczak – 17/36, 205 yards, 2 INT
- NYG – Jeff Hostetler – 10/17, 112 yards, 2 TD

Top rushers

- CHI – Neal Anderson – 12 rushes, 19 yards
- NYG – Ottis Anderson – 21 rushes, 80 yards

Top receivers

- CHI – Wendell Davis – 3 receptions, 76 yards
- NYG – Stephen Baker – 3 receptions, 58 yards

The Giants defense dominated the game by allowing only 27 rushing yards and three points. This was the fewest rushing yards Chicago had gained in a game since 1967. Their previous low for the season was 100. Bears running back Neal Anderson, who had rushed for over 1,000 yards in the season and 102 yards in the previous playoff game, was held to 19 yards on 12 carries. Giants quarterback Jeff Hostetler, playing because starter Phil Simms suffered a season-ending injury, completed 10 out of 17 passes for 122 yards and two touchdowns, while also rushing for 43 yards and another score.

On Chicago's second possession of the game, Mark Collins of the Giants intercepted Mike Tomczak's pass after it bounced out of the hands of Dennis Gentry and returned it 11 yards to set up a 46-yard field goal by Matt Bahr. The Bears took the ensuing kickoff and drove to the Giants 27, but on fourth and 12, coach Mike Ditka decided against attempting a field goal in the 13 mph winds. On Chicago's conversion attempt, Anderson caught a pass from Tomczak, but was stuffed after a short gain. The Giants then drove 75 yards, including a 6-yard fourth down conversion catch by reserve tight end Bob Mrosko, to go up 10–0 on Hostetler's 21-yard completion to Stephen Baker.

In the second quarter, Hostetler lost a fumble while being sacked by Steve McMichael, and Bears defensive tackle Dan Hampton recovered the ball. Chicago then drove to the Giants 1-yard line. But on a fourth down conversion attempt, Giants defensive end John Washington plowed through Jim Covert's block attempt and tackled fullback Brad Muster for a loss. Still, the Bears managed to force a three-and-out, and convert good starting field position into a 33-yard field goal by Kevin Butler. But before the end of the half, the Giants went up 17–3 with an 80-yard, 11-play scoring drive. On the first play, Hostetler scrambled away from a Bears blitz and rushed for 11 yards. Later on, he converted a fourth and 1 at the Bears 32 with a 10-yard burst, and eventually he finished the drive with a 5-yard touchdown pass to tight end Howard Cross.

In the third quarter, Hostetler converted his third fourth down of the day with a 9-yard scramble on fourth and 6, and eventually finished the drive with a 3-yard touchdown run, putting his team up 24–3. Chicago responded with a drive to the Giants 5-yard line. On fourth and goal, Muster caught a pass at the 1, but was dropped by linebackers Pepper Johnson and Gary Reasons before he could get across the goal line. In the fourth quarter, Everson Walls returned an interception 37 yards to the Giants 49. The Giants then went on a grueling 51-yard drive consisting of 16 running plays, the last a 1-yard touchdown plunge by fullback Maurice Carthon, that ate up a staggering 10:30 of play time.

This game offered a preview of what lay in store for Super Bowl XXV, as the Giants scored on drives of 75, 80, 49 and 51 yards, which lasted nine, 11, 11 and 16 plays. Overall, the Giants held the ball for 38:22, compared to Chicago's 21:38. The only negative thing for New York was the loss of running back Rodney Hampton, who suffered a broken leg in the first half.

This was the eighth postseason meeting between the Bears and Giants. Chicago had won five of the previous seven meetings.

Previous playoff games
Chicago leads 5–2 in all-time playoff games

1933

New York Giants 21 @ Chicago Bears 23

1933 NFL Championship Game

1934

Chicago Bears 13 @ New York Giants 30

1934 NFL Championship Game

1941

New York Giants 9 @ Chicago Bears 37

1941 NFL Championship Game

1946

Chicago Bears 24 @ New York Giants 14

1946 NFL Championship Game

1956

Chicago Bears 7 @ New York Giants 47

1956 NFL Championship Game

1963

New York Giants 10 @ Chicago Bears 14

1963 NFL Championship Game

1985

New York Giants 0 @ Chicago Bears 21

1985 NFC divisional playoffs

==== AFC: Los Angeles Raiders 20, Cincinnati Bengals 10 ====
Cincinnati Bengals vs. Los Angeles Raiders – Game summary

Quarter	1	2	3	4	Total
Bengals	0	3	0	7	10
Raiders	0	7	3	10	20

at Los Angeles Memorial Coliseum, Los Angeles, California

- Game time: 4:00 p.m. EST/1:00 p.m. PST
- Game weather: 60 °F (16 °C), clear
- Game attendance: 92,045
- Referee: Tom Dooley
- TV announcers (NBC): Dick Enberg (play-by-play) and Bill Walsh (color commentator)

Game information

First quarter

- No scoring plays.

Second quarter

- CIN – Jim Breech 27-yard field goal. Bengals 3–0.
- RAI – Mervyn Fernandez 13-yard pass from Jay Schroeder (Jeff Jaeger kick). Raiders 7–3.

Third quarter

- RAI – Jeff Jaeger 49-yard field goal. Raiders 10–3.

Fourth quarter

- CIN – Stanford Jennings 8-yard pass from Boomer Esiason (Jim Breech kick). Tied 10–10.
- RAI – Ethan Horton 41-yard pass from Jay Schroeder (Jeff Jaeger kick). Raiders 17–10.
- RAI – Jeff Jaeger 25-yard field goal. Raiders 20–10.

Top passers

- CIN – Boomer Esiason – 8/15, 104 yards, TD
- RAI – Jay Schroeder – 11/21, 172 yards, 2 TD, INT

Top rushers

- CIN – Ickey Woods – 11 rushes, 73 yards
- RAI – Marcus Allen – 21 rushes, 140 yards

Top receivers

- CIN – Rodney Holman – 2 receptions, 51 yards
- RAI – Ethan Horton – 4 receptions, 77 yards, TD

The Raiders, who had defeated Cincinnati 24–7 during the regular season, recorded 235 rushing yards (with 140 of them coming from running back Marcus Allen), while holding the Bengals to just 182 total yards and sacking Boomer Esiason four times (three by lineman Greg Townsend), but still had to score 10 unanswered points in the fourth quarter to clinch the victory.

The Bengals came into this game crippled by injuries. Starting running back James Brooks, still recovering from a dislocated thumb he received in the previous week, was held to just 26 rushing yards on 11 carries, while starting offensive tackle Anthony Muñoz and guard Bruce Reimers both had to miss the game. The injury to Munoz, a future Hall of Famer, was particularly devastating, as the team was forced to assign Kirk Scrafford, a rookie in his first NFL start, to block Townsend, who had led the Raiders with 12.5 sacks during the season.

After forcing the Bengals to punt on the opening drive, Tim Brown gave his team good field position with a 17-yard return to the Raiders 45. Los Angeles then drove to the Bengals 24-yard line, only to turn the ball over when Solomon Wilcots batted down Jay Schroeder's pass on fourth down and 1. Los Angeles later advanced to midfield where Jeff Gossett's punt pinned the Bengals back at their own 5-yard line. But Cincinnati still managed to drive 87 yards in nine plays. Quarterback Boomer Esiason completed a 22-yard pass to Brooks and a 40-yard throw to tight end Rodney Holman, while Ickey Woods' 11-yard run gave the Bengals a first down on the Raiders 19-yard line. However, the Raiders defense managed to keep Cincinnati out of the end zone, forcing them to settle for Jim Breech's 27-yard field goal to take a 3–0 lead with 12:07 left in the second quarter. Los Angeles quickly countered with Bo Jackson rushing three times for 36 yards and Marcus Allen rushing once for 19 on the way to a 13-yard touchdown pass from Schroeder to Mervyn Fernandez.

On the third play of the second half, Jackson broke off a 34-yard run, but was knocked out of the game on the play, and the team failed to score when Bengals safety David Fulcher intercepted a pass that bounced out of Allen's hands and returned it 11 yards to the Cincinnati 19-yard line. After forcing a punt, the Raiders drove 45 yards in eight plays and scored on a 49-yard Jeff Jaeger field goal to increase their lead to 10–3. Cincinnati responded with a 13-play (11 runs), 71-yard drive to score on Esiason's 8-yard touchdown pass to running back Stanford Jennings, tying the game with just under 12 minutes left in the game. But the Raiders took over the game from that point with consecutive scoring drives. The Bengals defense seemed ready to force a punt when linebacker Carl Zander sacked Schroeder for a 10-yard loss, bringing up third down and 20 from the Raiders 22-yard line. But on the next play, Schroeder completed a 26-yard pass to Brown for a first down. Following two running plays, Schroeder threw a 41-yard touchdown bomb to tight end Ethan Horton that put the Raiders up 17–10 at the end of a 7-play, 80-yard drive. On the third play of the Bengals ensuing drive, Townsend sacked Esiason for a 15-yard loss that forced the Bengals to punt. Taking over on their own 30-yard line, Los Angeles put the game away with a 62-yard drive, featuring runs by Allen for gains of 20 and 18 yards, that ate up 5:13 and ended on Jaeger's 25-yard field goal with 19 seconds left in the game.

This was Bo Jackson's final NFL game, having injured his left hip during the third quarter while being tackled from behind by Bengals linebacker Kevin Walker. The injury was later revealed to have caused a degenerative bone condition in Jackson's hip called avascular necrosis. Before being knocked out of the game, he rushed six times for 77 yards. Some Bengals fans theorize that this injury to one of the greatest athletes ever placed a curse on the Bengals franchise (sometimes called "the curse of Bo Jackson"), and that this curse is partially responsible for the Bengals' notorious failure to field a competitive football team for most of the next decade and a half.

This game is also notable for being Allen's last 100-plus yard rushing performance with the Raiders, as well as the last postseason game the Bengals would play in until 2005. The Bengals did not win another playoff game until 2022, when they ended the curse by beating the Raiders. Their winless playoff streak was the longest among all 32 NFL teams. Both quarterbacks combined for just 19 completions (8 by Esiason, 11 by Schroeder).

This was the second postseason meeting between the Bengals and Raiders. The Raiders won the only previous meeting while in Oakland.

Previous playoff games
Los Angeles/ Oakland Raiders leads 1–0 in all-time playoff games

1975

Cincinnati Bengals 28 @ Oakland Raiders 31

1975 AFC divisional playoffs

== Conference championships ==
=== Sunday, January 20, 1991 ===
==== AFC: Buffalo Bills 51, Los Angeles Raiders 3 ====
Los Angeles Raiders vs. Buffalo Bills – Game summary

Quarter	1	2	3	4	Total
Raiders	3	0	0	0	3
Bills	21	20	0	10	51

at Rich Stadium, Orchard Park, New York

- Game time: 12:30 p.m. EST
- Game weather: 38 °F (3 °C), occasional rain
- Game attendance: 80,325
- Referee: Jim Tunney
- TV announcers (NBC): Dick Enberg (play-by-play) and Bill Walsh (color commentator)

Game information

First quarter

- BUF – James Lofton 13-yard pass from Jim Kelly (Scott Norwood kick). Bills 7–0.
- RAI – Jeff Jaeger 41-yard field goal. Bills 7–3.
- BUF – Thurman Thomas 12-yard run (Scott Norwood kick). Bills 14–3.
- BUF – Darryl Talley 27-yard interception return (Scott Norwood kick). Bills 21–3.

Second quarter

- BUF – Kenneth Davis 1-yard run (kick blocked). Bills 27–3.
- BUF – Kenneth Davis 3-yard run (Scott Norwood kick). Bills 34–3.
- BUF – James Lofton 8-yard pass from Jim Kelly (Scott Norwood kick). Bills 41–3.

Third quarter

- No scoring plays.

Fourth quarter

- BUF – Kenneth Davis 1-yard run (Scott Norwood kick). Bills 48–3.
- BUF – Scott Norwood 39-yard field goal. Bills 51–3.

Top passers

- RAI – Jay Schroeder – 13/31, 150 yards, 5 INT
- BUF – Jim Kelly – 17/23, 300 yards, 2 TD, INT

Top rushers

- RAI – Greg Bell – 5 rushes, 36 yards
- BUF – Thurman Thomas – 25 rushes, 138 yards, TD

Top receivers

- RAI – Mervyn Fernandez – 4 receptions, 57 yards
- BUF – James Lofton – 5 receptions, 113 yards, 2 TD

Raiders head coach Art Shell became the first African-American coach to take his team to a conference championship game, but the results were not in his favor. Two years after a devastating loss in Cincinnati, the Bills returned to the AFC title game and, this time, shredded the Raiders, 51–3.

On Buffalo's opening drive, Kelly completed six consecutive passes for 65 yards, the last a 13-yard touchdown toss to Lofton after he recovered a fumbled snap in shotgun formation. The Raiders responded with Schroeder's two 26-yard completions to Willie Gault and Mervyn Fernandez, setting up a 41-yard field goal from Jeff Jaeger, but Buffalo stormed back to score just four plays after the ensuing kickoff on a 66-yard drive. Following a 41-yard completion from Kelly to Lofton, and an 11-yard scramble by Kelly, Thomas's 12-yard touchdown run gave the Bills a 14–3 lead. After a punt, Garry Lewis intercepted a pass from Kelly that went through Thomas's hands. But three plays later, Talley intercepted a pass from Schroeder and returned it for a touchdown. The Raiders were forced to punt on their next possession, and Nate Odomes returned it 18 yards to the Bills 42-yard line. Buffalo then drove 58 yards in 12 plays, scoring with a 1-yard touchdown run by Davis on fourth and goal, which gave the team a 27–3 lead after LA's Scott Davis blocked the extra point.

The Bills had a chance to score again when Jamie Mueller recovered a fumble from Jamie Holland on the ensuing kickoff. But this time LA's defense stopped Buffalo on three straight plays and Scott Norwood missed a 45-yard field goal attempt. Still, Buffalo's dominance would resume after this. Following a Raiders punt, Kelly's completions to Thomas and Steve Tasker for gains of 15 and 44 yards set up Davis's second touchdown run. Then Odomes intercepted a pass from Schroeder and returned it 9 yards to the Bills 38-yard line. Buffalo drove for 62 yards and took a 41–3 lead just before the end of the half. The key player of the drive was Lofton, who caught a 36-yard pass from Kelly, and then caught an 8-yard scoring pass from him on the next play.

The misery would continue for Los Angeles in the second half, as their first three drives ended with interceptions. Meanwhile, Buffalo increased their lead to 48–3 with Davis's third touchdown on the first play of the fourth quarter. Later on, Talley intercepted a pass from Schroeder and returned it 31 yards to the Raiders 27-yard line, setting up Norwood's 39-yard field goal to make the final score 51–3.

On offense, the Bills amassed 502 total yards, including 202 yards on the ground. Running back Thurman Thomas rushed for 138 yards and a touchdown while also catching five passes for 61 yards. Running back Kenneth Davis tied an AFC playoff record with three rushing touchdowns, despite gaining only 21 yards on 10 carries. Buffalo also set an NFL playoff record by scoring 41 points in the first half. Bills quarterback Jim Kelly threw for 300 yards and two touchdowns to wide receiver James Lofton, who finished the game with five receptions for 113 yards. Thomas recorded a 12-yard touchdown run, while Davis scored from one yard, three yards, and one yard out. Linebacker Darryl Talley returned one of his two interceptions 27 yards for a touchdown.

Buffalo recorded a total of six interceptions, the third highest total ever in a single NFL game. Mark Kelso recorded his fourth career postseason interception in the game, a Bills' record.

For Los Angeles, quarterback Jay Schroeder completed only 13 of his 31 passes for 150 yards. Of those 150 yards, 52 came on two 26-yard completions to Mervyn Fernandez and Willie Gault on Los Angeles's first offensive series. His five interceptions tied him with Dan Pastorini of the Oilers and Richard Todd of the Jets with what was at the time the most interceptions thrown in a playoff game since the AFL–NFL merger (eleven years later, Brett Favre would throw six in a game). That record still stands for either conference championship games or Super Bowls; twelve years after Schroeder threw five interceptions in Buffalo, Rich Gannon did so for the Raiders against Tampa Bay in Super Bowl XXXVII. Vince Evans replaced Schroeder in the fourth quarter and completed two of his eight passes for 26 yards but threw L.A.'s sixth interception of the day.

Running back Marcus Allen, seeking to return to Tampa seven years after winning Super Bowl MVP honors in Tampa Stadium, gained just 26 yards on 10 carries. Former Ram Greg Bell, himself a year removed from a blowout loss in the NFC title game in San Francisco, led the Raiders in rushing with 36 yards, despite only carrying the ball 5 times. Coincidentally, as was the case for the Rams a year earlier, the Raiders only scored three points the entire game during the first half of play.

Arguably, what hurt the Raiders the most (besides inclement weather conditions) was the loss of Bo Jackson. On television, both the day before and the day of the game, O. J. Simpson opined that Jackson's injury would cause him to miss both the AFC title game (and, additionally, the Super Bowl) and the start of baseball that spring. Simpson, though roundly criticized for the remark, was proven correct. So onerous was Jackson's absence that January day that, according to Mike Downey of the Los Angeles Times, "Buffalo fans batted [...] a Bo Jackson inflatable doll [...] around in the stands.

That January day in Buffalo would be the last AFC title game appearance for the Raiders for ten years. Coincidentally, the Raiders only managed three points in that game; coincidentally, their Super Bowl opponent would have been the New York Giants; and, coincidentally, that Super Bowl was also played in Tampa, albeit this time at Raymond James Stadium.

Referee Jim Tunney retired following this game, concluding a stellar 31-year career in which he was the referee for three Super Bowls (VI, XI and XII).

This was the first postseason meeting between the Raiders and Bills.

==== NFC: New York Giants 15, San Francisco 49ers 13 ====
New York Giants vs. San Francisco 49ers – Game summary

Quarter	1	2	3	4	Total
Giants	3	3	3	6	15
49ers	3	3	7	0	13

at Candlestick Park, San Francisco, California

- Game time: 4:00 p.m. EST/1:00 p.m. PST
- Game weather: 51 °F (11 °C), passing clouds
- Game attendance: 65,750
- Referee: Jerry Markbreit
- TV announcers (CBS): Pat Summerall (play-by-play) and John Madden (color commentator)

Game information

First quarter

- SF – Mike Cofer 47-yard field goal. 49ers 3–0.
- NYG – Matt Bahr 28-yard field goal. Tied 3–3.

Second quarter

- NYG – Matt Bahr 42-yard field goal. Giants 6–3.
- SF – Mike Cofer 35-yard field goal. Tied 6–6.

Third quarter

- SF – John Taylor 61-yard pass from Joe Montana (Mike Cofer kick). 49ers 13–6.
- NYG – Matt Bahr 46-yard field goal. 49ers 13–9.

Fourth quarter

- NYG – Matt Bahr 38-yard field goal. 49ers 13–12.
- NYG – Matt Bahr 42-yard field goal. Giants 15–13.

Top passers

- NYG – Jeff Hostetler – 15/27, 176 yards
- SF – Joe Montana – 18/26, 190 yards, TD

Top rushers

- NYG – Ottis Anderson – 20 rushes, 67 yards
- SF – Roger Craig – 8 rushes, 26 yards

Top receivers

- NYG – Mark Ingram – 5 receptions, 82 yards
- SF – John Taylor – 2 receptions, 75 yards, TD

The Giants were seeking their first trip to the Super Bowl since they won Super Bowl XXI, while the 49ers were looking to join the Miami Dolphins as the only other team to advance to three consecutive Super Bowls. Exactly six years after winning his second ring in four years, 49ers quarterback Joe Montana was aiming to play for (and, the 49ers hoped, to win) his fifth ring in ten years.

Following their win over Chicago, Giants coach Bill Parcells mentioned travel arrangements in a team meeting during the week. Since the customary week off before the Super Bowl for this season was not on the schedule, Parcells told the team prior to leaving for Newark Airport that they had two packing options: either pack just for the trip to San Francisco, or pack for that trip and a second trip to Tampa. He then showed the team he was packing for both trips as a motivational tactic.

In a mostly defensive battle, 49ers running back Roger Craig's (playing in what would be his final game in a 49er uniform) fumble with 2:36 left in the game led to Giants kicker Matt Bahr's 42-yard game-winning field goal as time ran out. Bahr was New York's only scorer, as he made five out of six field goals. Although the Giants outrushed the 49ers, 152 yards to 49, the game was tied 6–6 at halftime.

San Francisco opened the game with a 10-play, 44-yard drive, the longest play a 14-yard reception by John Taylor. Replays showed the ball coming out of his hands as he went to the ground, but the play was ruled a catch and NFL rules at the time did not allow a replay challenge. A few plays later, Mike Cofer kicked a 47-yard field goal to make the score 3–0. New York struck back by driving 69 yards in 15 plays, including a 21-yard completion from Jeff Hostetler to Mark Ingram Sr. on 3rd and 14 (Hostetler's longest completion of the game). Near the end of the drive, Dave Meggett took the ball on a halfback option, rolled out and delivered a strike to fullback Maurice Carthon. Carthon dropped the ball in the back of the end zone. It was the closest the Giants would get to scoring a touchdown. Bahr finished the drive with a 35-yard field goal that tied the game with 2:41 left in the first quarter.

The second quarter was mostly uneventful, but following a few punts, New York drove 56 yards in 14 plays to take a 6–3 lead on Bahr's 42-yard field goal with one minute left in the half. However, the 49ers offense which had been dominated the entire quarter suddenly sprung to life. First, Dexter Carter returned the kickoff 27 yards to the 49ers 34-yard line. Then Joe Montana went to work, completing a 19-yard pass to Jerry Rice and rushing for a 7-yard gain, and then completing a 5-yard pass to Craig over the next three plays. A personal foul penalty on Giants lineman Eric Dorsey added 15 yards to Craig's catch and gave the 49ers a first down on the New York 21. On the next play, Montana was sacked for an 8-yard loss by Leonard Marshall, but he followed this up with two completions to Craig that advanced the ball to the 17, where Cofer kicked a 35-yard field goal that tied the score at 6 going into halftime.

New York had to punt on the first possession of the second half, and Taylor returned the ball 31 yards to the 49ers 39-yard line. On the next play, Taylor took in a pass from Montana while in single coverage by Everson Walls. Walls stepped in front of Taylor, but completely missed the ball, enabling Taylor to catch the pass with no one between him and the end zone, where he proceeded to take off for a 61-yard touchdown catch that gave San Francisco a 13–6 lead. New York responded by driving 50 yards and scoring with a 46-yard field goal by Bahr that made the score 13–9 with 6:06 left in the third quarter. The Giants soon had a chance to score again when Dave Meggett returned a 49ers punt 18 yards to the New York 45-yard line. Two carries by Ottis Anderson gained 36 yards and moved the ball into the red zone, but they could go no further and Bahr missed a 37-yard field goal attempt.

In the fourth quarter, Giants quarterback Jeff Hostetler was hit at the knees by 49ers defensive tackle Jim Burt. Hostetler was injured on the play, but walked off the field without assistance. Giants linebacker Carl Banks later recalled that the defense was infuriated by the play and looked to strike back. "It was unspoken...that if you hurt one of our guys, we knew who to go after," Banks said.

On the 49ers' next drive, Montana called a pass play on third down. With the New York defense covering all of his receivers, Montana was forced to move outside the pocket towards his right to make a play. Giants linebacker Lawrence Taylor was the first Giant to try to bring Montana down, with defensive end Leonard Marshall trailing the play, getting up from a crawl after going to the ground from a Tom Rathman block earlier in the sequence. Montana stepped back out of the path of Taylor's rush, only to move into Marshall's oncoming charge from the blind side. Marshall drilled Montana hard in the back, driving him into the turf and forcing a fumble. The 49ers managed to recover the fumble as the ball skipped past Giants cornerback Mark Collins and lineman Steve Wallace corralled the football, enabling the 49ers to punt. Marshall hit Montana so hard that he suffered a bruised sternum, bruised stomach, cracked ribs, and a broken hand. Montana would not play in another regular-season game until December 1992.

Hostetler returned for the next drive but the Giants went three-and-out. On the next play, the Giants executed the most important special-teams play of the contest. New York called a fake punt with the ball snapped directly to linebacker Gary Reasons, the upback in the punt formation, and he ran 30 yards for a first down through an undermanned 49ers defense that had only sent 10 men on to the field. Only a tackle by Taylor, the 49ers punt returner, prevented him from taking it all the way. Hostetler then drove the Giants to the opposing 21-yard line, but could get no further and nearly threw an interception on a third-down pass toward the end zone. Bahr kicked his fourth field goal of the game with 5:47 left to bring the score to 13–12.

Steve Young came in to replace Montana on the next drive, and the 49ers tried to run as much time as they could off the clock. On the second play of the drive Brent Jones got behind the Giants defense; on his only pass attempt of the afternoon, Young hit Jones for a 25-yard gain. Two plays later, Craig recorded a six-yard gain for the 49ers' first rushing first down of the day. It would also be their last offensive first down of the game.

The 49ers called another run on their next play, with Craig called on to run up the middle through a hole created by guard Guy McIntyre and center Jesse Sapolu with a double team block on defensive tackle Erik Howard. However, McIntyre was forced to move off of the block to defend against linebacker Pepper Johnson, and the hole closed. Sapolu was able to push Howard down to the ground, but did so just as Craig was reaching him. While all this was going on, Taylor was converging on the play from the other side having gotten past tight end Brent Jones. Howard made contact with the football on his way down, knocking it free from Craig's hands, and Taylor was able to grab it out of the air before it hit the turf.

With 2:36 left and with all three timeouts, Hostetler and the Giants began driving again. He hit Mark Bavaro for 19 yards on the first play and later hit Stephen Baker for 13 more on a second down to set up a short run by Ottis Anderson for two yards and a first down. The Giants called two running plays to get the ball to the middle of the field, and with four seconds left Bahr was called on to try to win the game. His kick went through the uprights as time ran out and the Giants won 15–13.

As mentioned earlier, the Giants outrushed the 49ers 152 yards to 49. Anderson led all rushers with 67 yards on 20 carries. Hostetler completed 15 of 27 passes for 176 yards, threw no touchdowns, was not intercepted, and had a quarterback rating of 75 for the game. Montana, meanwhile, completed 18 of 26 passes for 190 yards and 1 touchdown for a quarterback rating of 103. Sixty-one of those yards, though, came on said touchdown pass to Taylor. Montana's quarterback rating, minus the touchdown, was 80.3 (17 of 25 for 129 yards). Craig, despite losing a costly fumble, still led the 49ers in rushing: 8 carries for 26 yards. Montana (2 carries for 9 yards) and Tom Rathman (1 carry for 4 yards) rounded out the 49ers' rushing statistics.

After the game, it was speculated that, even if the 49ers had won, Young would have started the Super Bowl because of the severity and scope of the injuries Montana incurred from the hit by Leonard Marshall (see above).

The game was featured in the NFL's Greatest Games as the End of a Dynasty.

This was the fifth postseason meeting between the Giants and 49ers. Both teams split the previous four meetings.

Previous playoff games
Tied 2–2 in all-time playoff games

1981

New York Giants 24 @ San Francisco 49ers 38

1981 NFC divisional playoffs

1984

New York Giants 10 @ San Francisco 49ers 21

1984 NFC divisional playoffs

1985

San Francisco 49ers 3 @ New York Giants 17

1985 NFC wild card playoffs

1986

San Francisco 49ers 3 @ New York Giants 49

1986 NFC divisional playoffs

== Super Bowl XXV: New York Giants 20, Buffalo Bills 19 ==
Super Bowl XXV – Buffalo Bills vs. New York Giants – game summary

Quarter	1	2	3	4	Total
Bills (AFC)	3	9	0	7	19
Giants (NFC)	3	7	7	3	20

at Tampa Stadium, Tampa, Florida

- Date: January 27, 1991
- Game attendance: 73,813
- Referee: Jerry Seeman
- TV announcers (ABC): Al Michaels (play-by-play), Frank Gifford, and Dan Dierdorf (color commentators)

This was the first Super Bowl meeting between the Bills and Giants, and the first to feature two teams representing the same state (even though the Giants play in East Rutherford, New Jersey, a nearby suburb of New York City).
