= 1992 Cincinnati Bengals season =

NFL team season

- Owner: Mike Brown
- Head coach: Dave Shula
- Home stadium: Riverfront Stadium

Results
- Record: 5–11
- Division place: 4th AFC Central
- Playoffs: Did not qualify
- Pro Bowlers: RB Harold Green

The 1992 Cincinnati Bengals season was the team's 25th year in professional football and its 23rd with the National Football League (NFL). They finished the year with five wins and 11 losses, and did not qualify for the playoffs. The Bengals, who were then owned by Mike Brown, the son of coach Paul Brown, now turned to the son of another coach to lead the team on the field when he hired assistant Dave Shula to assume the head coaching reins. The Bengals selected University of Houston quarterback David Klingler in the first round of the 1992 NFL Draft. The younger Shula got off to a good start as the Bengals won their first two games, but then lost its next five games, on the way to a five-win season. Wide receiver Carl Pickens, a second-round selection out of the University of Tennessee, earned Offensive Rookie of the Year honors. Following the season, perennial all-pro offensive tackle Anthony Muñoz retired, as the Bengals moved in a new direction by trading quarterback Boomer Esiason to the New York Jets.

== Offseason ==
=== NFL draft ===
1992 Cincinnati Bengals draft
| Round | Pick | Player | Position | College | Notes |
| 1 | 6 | David Klingler | Quarterback | Houston | |
| 1 | 28 | Darryl Williams * | Defensive back | Miami (FL) | |
| 2 | 31 | Carl Pickens * | Wide receiver | Tennessee | |
| 3 | 84 | Leonard Wheeler | Defensive back | Troy State | |
| 4 | 88 | Ricardo McDonald | Linebacker | Pittsburgh | |
| 5 | 115 | Craig Thompson | Tight end | North Carolina A&T | |
| 6 | 142 | Chris Burns | Defensive tackle | Middle Tennessee State | |
| 7 | 172 | Lance Olberding | Offensive tackle | Iowa | |
| 8 | 199 | Roosevelt Nix | Defensive end | Central State (OH) | |
| 9 | 226 | Ostell Miles | Running back | Houston | |
| 10 | 256 | Horace Smith | Defensive back | Oregon Tech | |
| 11 | 283 | John Earle | Offensive tackle | Western Illinois | |
| 12 | 310 | Eric Shaw | Linebacker | Louisiana Tech | |
Made roster * Made at least one Pro Bowl during career

== Personnel ==
=== Staff ===
1992 Cincinnati Bengals staff
| Front office: President – John Sawyer; Vice President/General Manager – Mike Brown; Director of Player Personnel – Pete Brown; Head coaches: Head Coach – Dave Shula; Offensive coaches: Quarterbacks – Dana Bible; Running Backs – Jim Anderson; Wide Receivers – Richard Williamson; Tight Ends – Mike Pope; Offensive Line – Jim McNally | Defensive coaches: Defensive Coordinator – Ron Lynn; Defensive Line – Bob Karmelowicz; Linebackers – Mike Haluchak; Defensive Backs – Ron Meeks; Special teams coaches: Special Teams – Marv Braden; Strength and conditioning: Strength – Kim Wood |

=== Roster ===
1992 Cincinnati Bengals roster
| Quarterbacks (QB): 7 Boomer Esiason; 12 Donald Hollas; 15 David Klingler; Running backs (RB): 42 Eric Ball FB; 44 Derrick Fenner; 28 Harold Green; 36 Ostell Miles; Wide receivers (WR): 85 Tim McGee; 80 Carl Pickens; 88 Reggie Rembert; 84 Milt Stegall; 83 Elbert Turner; Tight ends (TE): 82 Rodney Holman; 49 Jeff Thomason; 48 Craig Thompson | Offensive linemen (OL): 65 Mike Arthur C; 64 Bruce Kozerski G; 62 Jon Melander G; 78 Anthony Muñoz T; 61 Thomas Rayam G; 77 Kevin Sargent T; 76 Kirk Scrafford G; 63 Joe Walter T; 60 Mike Withycombe C; Defensive linemen (DL): 97 Mike Frier DE; 69 Tim Krumrie NT; 99 Alonzo Mitz DE; 79 Lamar Rogers DE; 98 Tony Savage NT | Linebackers (LB): 58 Alex Gordon OLB; 56 Ricardo McDonald ILB; 52 Gary Reasons ILB; 90 Eric Shaw ILB; 96 Danny Stubbs OLB; 51 Brian Townsend OLB; 94 Alfred Williams OLB; Defensive backs (DB): 27 Barney Bussey SS; 29 Rickey Dixon FS; 33 David Fulcher SS; 25 Rod Jones CB; 32 Mitchell Price CB; 22 Eric Thomas CB; 37 Leonard Wheeler CB; 31 Darryl Williams FS; Special teams (ST): 3 Jim Breech K; 11 Lee Johnson P; 55 Randy Kirk LS | Practice squad: 38 Mike Dingle RB; 26 Richard Isaiah WR; Reserve: 57 Ray Bentley LB (IR); 81 Eddie Brown WR (NF-Inj.); 50 James Francis LB (IR); 35 Shane Garrett WR (IR); -- Adrian Jones CB (IR); -- Tom Ladd T (IR); 73 Ken Moyer G (IR); 95 Roosevelt Nix DE (IR); 89 Jeff Query WR (IR); 87 Jim Riggs TE (IR); -- Horace Smith CB (NF-Inj.); 34 Fernandus Vinson S (IR); 59 Kevin Walker ILB (IR); 47 active, 13 inactive, 2 practice squad Rookies in italics |

== Regular season ==
=== Schedule ===
| Week | Date | Opponent | Result | Record | Venue | Recap |
|---|---|---|---|---|---|---|
| 1 | September 6 | at Seattle Seahawks | **W** 21–3 | 1–0 | Kingdome | Recap |
| 2 | September 13 | Los Angeles Raiders | **W** 24–21 (OT) | 2–0 | Riverfront Stadium | Recap |
| 3 | September 20 | at Green Bay Packers | **L** 23–24 | 2–1 | Lambeau Field | Recap |
| 4 | September 27 | Minnesota Vikings | **L** 7–42 | 2–2 | Riverfront Stadium | Recap |
| 5 | Bye | | | | | |
| 6 | October 11 | **Houston Oilers** | **L** 24–38 | 2–3 | Riverfront Stadium | Recap |
| 7 | October 19 | at **Pittsburgh Steelers** | **L** 0–20 | 2–4 | Three Rivers Stadium | Recap |
| 8 | October 25 | at **Houston Oilers** | **L** 10–26 | 2–5 | Houston Astrodome | Recap |
| 9 | November 1 | **Cleveland Browns** | **W** 30–10 | 3–5 | Riverfront Stadium | Recap |
| 10 | November 8 | at Chicago Bears | **W** 31–28 (OT) | 4–5 | Soldier Field | Recap |
| 11 | November 15 | at New York Jets | **L** 17–14 | 4–6 | The Meadowlands | Recap |
| 12 | November 22 | Detroit Lions | **L** 13–19 | 4–7 | Riverfront Stadium | Recap |
| 13 | November 29 | **Pittsburgh Steelers** | **L** 9–21 | 4–8 | Riverfront Stadium | Recap |
| 14 | December 6 | at **Cleveland Browns** | **L** 21–37 | 4–9 | Cleveland Stadium | Recap |
| 15 | December 13 | at San Diego Chargers | **L** 10–27 | 4–10 | Jack Murphy Stadium | Recap |
| 16 | December 20 | New England Patriots | **W** 20–10 | 5–10 | Riverfront Stadium | Recap |
| 17 | December 27 | Indianapolis Colts | **L** 17–21 | 5–11 | Riverfront Stadium | Recap |
Note: Intra-division opponents are in **bold** text.

=== Game summaries ===
==== Week 3 at Packers ====
Week Three: Cincinnati Bengals (2–0) at Green Bay Packers (0–2)

| Quarter | 1 | 2 | 3 | 4 | Total |
|---|---|---|---|---|---|
| Bengals | 0 | 10 | 7 | 6 | **23** |
| **Packers** | 0 | 3 | 0 | 21 | **24** |

at Lambeau Field, Green Bay, Wisconsin

- Date: September 20
- Game time: 12:00 p.m. CST
- Game weather: Clear, 56 °F (13 °C)
- Game attendance: 57,272
- Referee: Dick Hantak
- TV announcers (NBC): Jim Lampley and Ahmad Rashad
- Box Score, Box Score

Game information

First quarter

- No scoring

Second quarter

- CIN – Jim Breech 20-yard field goal, 9:44. Bengals 3–0.
- CIN – Carl Pickens 95-yard punt return (Jim Breech kick), 6:55. Bengals 10–0.
- GB – Chris Jacke 37-yard field goal, 0:36. Bengals 10–3.

Third quarter

- CIN – Eric Ball 17-yard pass from Boomer Esiason (Jim Breech kick), 2:21. Bengals 17–3.

Fourth quarter

- GB – Terrell Buckley 58-yard punt return (Chris Jacke kick), 12:43. Bengals 17–10.
- GB – Sterling Sharpe 5-yard pass from Brett Favre (Chris Jacke kick), 10:49. Tie 17–17.
- CIN – Jim Breech 34-yard field goal, 8:05. Bengals 20–17.
- CIN – Jim Breech 41-yard field goal, 2:07. Bengals 23–17.
- GB – Kitrick Taylor 35-yard pass from Brett Favre (Chris Jacke kick), 0:13. Packers 24–23.

Top passers

- CIN – Boomer Esiason – 11/23, 128 yards, TD, 2 INT
- GB – Brett Favre – 22/39, 289 yards, 2 TD

Top rushers

- CIN – Harold Green – 21 rushes, 101 yards
- GB – Vince Workman – 14 rushes, 50 yards

Top receivers

- CIN – Tim McGee – 3 receptions, 43 yards
- GB – Sterling Sharpe – 7 receptions, 109 yards, TD

==== Week 10 ====
| Team | 1 | 2 | 3 | 4 | OT | Total |
|---|---|---|---|---|---|---|
| • Bengals | 7 | 0 | 14 | 7 | 3 | 31 |
| Bears | 7 | 14 | 7 | 0 | 0 | 28 |

- Date: November 8
- Location: Soldier Field, Chicago
- Game start: 7:00 p.m.
- Game attendance: 56,120
- Game weather: 36 °F (2.2 °C); wind 10 miles per hour (16 km/h; 8.7 kn)

Scoring summary
| Q1 | CIN | Derrick Fenner 2 yard run (Jim Breech kick) | CIN 7–0 |
| Q1 | CHI | Darren Lewis 15 yard run (Kevin Butler kick) | Tie 7–7 |
| Q2 | CHI | Anthony Morgan 46 yard pass from Jim Harbaugh (Kevin Butler kick) | CHI 14–7 |
| Q2 | CHI | Mark Green 1 yard run (Kevin Butler kick) | CHI 21–7 |
| Q3 | CIN | Eric Ball 35 yard pass from Boomer Esiason (Jim Breech kick) | CHI 21–14 |
| Q3 | CHI | Darren Lewis 97 yard kickoff return (Kevin Butler kick) | CHI 28–14 |
| Q3 | CIN | Craig Thompson 1 yard pass from Boomer Esiason (Jim Breech kick) | CHI 28–21 |
| Q4 | CIN | Carl Pickens 23 yard pass from Boomer Esiason (Jim Breech kick) | Tie 28–28 |
| OT | CIN | Jim Breech 36 yard field goal | CIN 31–28 |

=== Standings ===
AFC Central
| | W | L | T | PCT | DIV | CONF | PF | PA | STK |
|---|---|---|---|---|---|---|---|---|---|
| ^{(1)} Pittsburgh Steelers | 11 | 5 | 0 | .688 | 5–1 | 10–2 | 299 | 225 | W1 |
| ^{(5)} Houston Oilers | 10 | 6 | 0 | .625 | 3–3 | 7–5 | 352 | 258 | W2 |
| Cleveland Browns | 7 | 9 | 0 | .438 | 3–3 | 5–7 | 272 | 275 | L3 |
| Cincinnati Bengals | 5 | 11 | 0 | .313 | 1–5 | 4–8 | 274 | 364 | L1 |

== Team leaders ==
=== Passing ===
| Player | Att | Comp | Yds | TD | INT | Rating |
| Boomer Esiason | 278 | 144 | 1407 | 11 | 15 | 57.0 |

=== Rushing ===
| Player | Att | Yds | YPC | Long | TD |
| Harold Green | 265 | 1170 | 4.4 | 53 | 2 |
| Derrick Fenner | 112 | 500 | 4.5 | 35 | 7 |

=== Receiving ===
| Player | Rec | Yds | Avg | Long | TD |
| Harold Green | 41 | 214 | 5.2 | 19 | 0 |
| Tim McGee | 35 | 408 | 11.7 | 36 | 3 |
| Jeff Query | 16 | 265 | 16.6 | 83 | 3 |

=== Defensive ===
| Player | Tackles | Sacks | INTs | FF | FR |
| Tim Krumrie | 97 | 4.0 | 0 | 2 | 1 |
| Alfred Williams | 44 | 10.0 | 0 | 3 | 0 |
| Darryl Williams | 78 | 2.0 | 4 | 2 | 1 |

=== Kicking and punting ===
| Player | FGA | FGM | FG% | XPA | XPM | XP% | Points |
| Jim Breech | 27 | 19 | 70.4% | 31 | 31 | 100.0% | 88 |

| Player | Punts | Yards | Long | Blkd | Avg. |
| Lee Johnson | 76 | 3196 | 64 | 0 | 42.1 |

=== Special teams ===
| Player | KR | KRYards | KRAvg | KRLong | KRTD | PR | PRYards | PRAvg | PRLong | PRTD |
| Milt Stegall | 25 | 430 | 17.2 | 39 | 0 | 0 | 0 | 0.0 | 0 | 0 |
| Carl Pickens | 0 | 0 | 0.0 | 0 | 0 | 18 | 229 | 12.7 | 95 | 1 |

== Awards and records ==
=== All Rookies ===
- David Klingler, QB, PFWA All-Rookie Team
- Ricardo McDonald, ILB, PFWA All-Rookie Team
- Carl Pickens, WR, PFWA All-Rookie Team

=== Pro Bowl selections ===
- Harold Green RB, AFC Pro Bowl selection

=== Milestones ===
- Harold Green, 1st 1,000-yard season (1,170 yards)
