= 1990 San Francisco 49ers season =

American football team season

- Owner: Eddie DeBartolo Jr.
- General manager: John McVay and Carmen Policy
- Head coach: George Seifert
- Offensive coordinator: Mike Holmgren
- Defensive coordinator: Bill McPherson
- Home stadium: Candlestick Park

Results
- Record: 14–2
- Division place: 1st NFC West
- Playoffs: Won Divisional Playoffs (vs. Redskins) 28–10; Lost NFC Championship (vs. Giants) 13–15
- All-Pros: 7: QB Joe Montana; WR Jerry Rice; G Guy McIntyre; DE Kevin Fagan; LB Charles Haley; CB Don Griffin; FS Ronnie Lott
- Pro Bowlers: 5: QB Joe Montana; WR Jerry Rice; G Guy McIntyre; LB Charles Haley; FS Ronnie Lott

The 1990 San Francisco 49ers season was the franchise's 41st season in the National Football League (NFL) and their 45th overall. the team entered the 1990 season heavily favored to win their third consecutive Super Bowl. The season was highlighted by their victory over the New York Giants on Monday Night Football in Week 13. Throughout the season, the 49ers and the Giants were the two best teams in the NFL and they met again in the NFC Championship Game.

Between 1988 and 1990, the 49ers set a league record with 18 consecutive road victories. Jerry Rice had a career year by becoming the fourth receiver in the history of American football to have at least 100 receptions in one season. The 49ers won their fifth consecutive NFC West Division Title. Dating back to 1989, the 49ers completed a fifteen-game unbeaten streak in the regular season (5 victories in the last 5 games of 1989 and 10 victories in the first ten games of 1990).

The 49ers lost in the final seconds of the NFC Championship Game on a field goal by the eventual Super Bowl champion New York Giants, denying them a chance at a "three-peat" in the Super Bowl.

Following this season, the 49ers left team stalwarts Roger Craig (RB) and Ronnie Lott (FS) unprotected and let them go to the Los Angeles Raiders via Plan B free agency. Quarterback Joe Montana remained on the roster for the next two seasons, but never started another game for the 49ers. This would ultimately be the de facto final season for Montana as the 49ers starting quarterback, Montana would sit out all of 1991 and most of the 1992 season due to an elbow injury.

Montana had the NFL's highest salary in 1990 at $4 million, and the 49ers had the league's highest team payroll ($26.8 million).

== Offseason ==
=== NFL draft ===
= Pro Bowler	= Hall of Famer

1990 San Francisco 49ers draft
Round	Selection	Player	Position	College
1	25	Dexter Carter	RB	Florida State
2	48	Dennis Brown	DE	Washington
2	54	Eric Davis	CB	Jacksonville State
3	69	Ronald Lewis	WR	Florida State
4	93	Dean Caliguire	C	Pittsburgh
6	166	Frank Pollack	DT	Northern Arizona
8	221	Dwight Pickens	WR	Fresno State
9	249	Odell Haggins	DT	Florida State
10	277	Martin Harrison	DE	Washington
11	290	Anthony Shelton	SS	Tennessee State

== Staff ==
1990 San Francisco 49ers staff
Front office: Owner/president – Edward J. DeBartolo Jr.; Executive vice president/general counsel – Carmen Policy; Vice president of football administration – John McVay; Administrator of football operations – Neal Dahlen; Administrator of college scouting – Tony Razzano; Administrator of pro personnel – Allan Webb; Executive administrative assistant – Dwight Clark; Head coaches: Head coach – George Seifert; Offensive coaches: Offensive coordinator/quarterbacks – Mike Holmgren; Running backs – Al Lavan; Wide receivers – Sherman Lewis; Offensive line – Bobb McKittrick; Offensive quality control – Jon Gruden	Defensive coaches: Defensive coordinator – Bill McPherson; Defensive line – John Marshall; Assistant defensive line – Dwaine Board; Linebackers – Bob Zeman; Defensive backs/secondary – Ray Rhodes; Defensive assistant – Tommy Hart; Special teams coaches: Special teams coordinator/tight ends – Lynn Stiles; Strength and conditioning: Physical development coordinator – Jerry Attaway

== Roster ==
1990 San Francisco 49ers roster
Quarterbacks (QB): 13 Steve Bono; 16 Joe Montana; 8 Steve Young; Running backs (RB): 35 Dexter Carter; 33 Roger Craig; 30 Keith Henderson; 44 Tom Rathman FB; 24 Harry Sydney; 23 Spencer Tillman; Wide receivers (WR): 83 Ron Lewis; 80 Jerry Rice; 82 John Taylor; 85 Mike Wilson; Tight ends (TE): 84 Brent Jones; 89 Wesley Walls; 81 Jamie Williams	Offensive linemen (OL): 79 Harris Barton G; 62 Guy McIntyre G; 77 Bubba Paris T; 72 Frank Pollack T; 61 Jesse Sapolu C; 63 Ricky Siglar G/T; 60 Chuck Thomas C; 74 Steve Wallace T; Defensive linemen (DL): 96 Dennis Brown DE; 64 Jim Burt NT; 95 Michael Carter NT; 75 Kevin Fagan DE; 78 Pierce Holt DE; 67 Pete Kugler NT; 91 Larry Roberts DE	Linebackers (LB): 59 Keith DeLong ILB; 50 LeRoy Etienne ILB; 94 Charles Haley OLB; 54 Matt Millen ILB; 53 Bill Romanowski OLB; 58 Keena Turner OLB; Defensive backs (DB): 38 Greg Cox SS; 25 Eric Davis CB; 29 Don Griffin CB; 40 Johnnie Jackson FS; 45 Kevin Lewis CB; 42 Ronnie Lott FS; 26 Darryl Pollard CB; 43 Dave Waymer SS; Special teams (ST): 6 Mike Cofer K; 9 Barry Helton P	Practice squad: 86 Sanjay Beach WR; 71 Brett Wiese G; Reserve: 31 Chet Brooks S (IR); -- Dean Caliguire C (PUP); 68 Dave Cullity T (IR); 55 Jim Fahnhorst LB (IR); -- Wayne Radloff C (IR); 88 Mike Sherrard WR (IR); 76 Fred Smerlas NT (IR); 99 Michael Walter LB (IR); 21 Eric Wright CB (IR); Rookies in italics 47 active, 9 reserve, 2 practice squad

== Preseason ==
Week	Date	Opponent	Result	Record	Venue
1	August 11	Los Angeles Raiders	L 13–23	0–1	Candlestick Park
2	August 20	at Denver Broncos	W 27–24	1–1	Mile High Stadium
3	August 25	at San Diego Chargers	L 28–29	1–2	Jack Murphy Stadium
4	August 31	Seattle Seahawks	L 10–30	1–3	Candlestick Park

== Regular season ==
=== Schedule ===
Week	Date	Opponent	Result	Record	Venue	Attendance	Recap
1	September 10	at **New Orleans Saints**	**W** 13–12	1–0	Louisiana Superdome	68,629	Recap
2	September 16	Washington Redskins	**W** 26–13	2–0	Candlestick Park	64,287	Recap
3	September 23	**Atlanta Falcons**	**W** 19–13	3–0	Candlestick Park	62,858	Recap
4	Bye						
5	October 7	at Houston Oilers	**W** 24–21	4–0	Astrodome	59,931	Recap
6	October 14	at **Atlanta Falcons**	**W** 45–35	5–0	Atlanta–Fulton County Stadium	57,921	Recap
7	October 21	Pittsburgh Steelers	**W** 27–7	6–0	Candlestick Park	64,301	Recap
8	October 28	Cleveland Browns	**W** 20–17	7–0	Candlestick Park	63,672	Recap
9	November 4	at Green Bay Packers	**W** 24–20	8–0	Lambeau Field	58,835	Recap
10	November 11	at Dallas Cowboys	**W** 24–6	9–0	Texas Stadium	62,966	Recap
11	November 18	Tampa Bay Buccaneers	**W** 31–7	10–0	Candlestick Park	62,221	Recap
12	November 25	**Los Angeles Rams**	**L** 17–28	10–1	Candlestick Park	62,633	Recap
13	December 3	New York Giants	**W** 7–3	11–1	Candlestick Park	66,092	Recap
14	December 9	at Cincinnati Bengals	**W** 20–17 (OT)	12–1	Riverfront Stadium	60,084	Recap
15	December 17	at **Los Angeles Rams**	**W** 26–10	13–1	Anaheim Stadium	65,619	Recap
16	December 23	**New Orleans Saints**	**L** 10–13	13–2	Candlestick Park	60,112	Recap
17	December 30	at Minnesota Vikings	**W** 20–17	14–2	Hubert H. Humphrey Metrodome	51,590	Recap
Note: Intra-division opponents are in **bold** text.

=== Game summaries ===
==== Week 6: at Atlanta Falcons ====
- October 14, 1990 – Joe Montana set a 49ers record by throwing for 476 yards in one game and throwing six touchdown passes.
- October 14, 1990 – Jerry Rice set a 49ers record with 5 touchdown receptions and 30 points in one game.

==== Week 9: at Green Bay Packers ====
- November 4, 1990 – In a game versus the Green Bay Packers, Joe Montana threw for 411 yards and 3 touchdown passes.

==== Week 13: vs. New York Giants ====
Week Thirteen: New York Giants (10–1) at San Francisco 49ers (10–1)

Quarter	1	2	3	4	Total
Giants	0	3	0	0	**3**
49ers	0	7	0	0	**7**

at Candlestick Park • San Francisco, California

- Date: December 3
- Game time: 9:00 p.m. EDT
- Game weather: 49 °F (9 °C) • Wind 3 miles per hour (4.8 km/h; 2.6 kn)
- Game attendance: 66,092
- Referee: Dale Hamer
- TV announcers (ABC): Al Michaels, Frank Gifford, Dan Dierdorf
- Pro-Football-Reference.com, The Football Database

Game information

Giants

- Phil Simms
  14/32, 153 Yds
- Ottis Anderson
  19 Rush, 39 Yds
- Mark Bavaro
  3 Rec, 43 Yds

49ers

- Joe Montana
  12/29, 152 Yds, TD
- Dexter Carter
  12 Rush, 29 Yds
- Roger Craig
  2 Rec, 42 Yds

It was the second highest rated Monday Night game ever at the time. The game had a 42% share and a 26.9 rating.

Scoring summary

Quarter	Time	Drive			Team	Scoring information	Score	
Quarter	Time	Plays	Yards	TOP	Team	Scoring information	NYG	SF
2	3:26				Giants	20-yard field goal by Matt Bahr	3	0
2	1:30				49ers	John Taylor 23-yard touchdown reception from Joe Montana, Mike Cofer kick good	3	7
"TOP" = time of possession. For other American football terms, see Glossary of American football.							3	7

==== Week 14: at Cincinnati Bengals ====
- December 9, 1990 – The 49ers beat the Cincinnati Bengals in overtime. Mike Cofer kicked a 23-yard field goal to give the 49ers a 20–17 victory.

=== Standings ===
NFC West
	W	L	T	PCT	DIV	CONF	PF	PA	STK
^{(1)} San Francisco 49ers	14	2	0	.875	4–2	10–2	353	239	W1
^{(6)} New Orleans Saints	8	8	0	.500	4–2	6–6	274	275	W2
Los Angeles Rams	5	11	0	.313	2–4	3–9	345	412	L4
Atlanta Falcons	5	11	0	.313	2–4	3–9	348	365	W2

== Postseason ==
=== Schedule ===
Round	Date	Opponent (seed)	Result	Record	Venue
Wild Card	First-round bye				
Divisional	January 12, 1991	Washington Redskins (5)	W 28–10	1–0	Candlestick Park
NFC Championship	January 20, 1991	New York Giants (2)	L 13–15	1–1	Candlestick Park

==== NFC Divisional Playoffs: vs. (5) Washington Redskins ====
NFC Divisional Playoffs: (5) Washington Redskins at (1) San Francisco 49ers – Game summary

Quarter	1	2	3	4	Total
Redskins	10	0	0	0	10
49ers	7	14	0	7	28

at Candlestick Park, San Francisco

- Date: January 12, 1991 (Sat)
- Game time: 4:00 p.m. EST/1:00 p.m. PST
- Game weather: 51 °F (11 °C), light rain
- Game attendance: 65,292
- Referee: Red Cashion
- TV announcers (CBS): Dick Stockton and Merlin Olsen

The Redskins opened up the scoring with an 8-play, 78-yard drive that culminated in Rypien's 31-yard touchdown completion to receiver Art Monk. San Francisco struck back by driving 74 yards in eight plays to tie the game on a 1-yard touchdown run by fullback Tom Rathman. A key play of the drive was an unnecessary roughness call against Redskins cornerback Darrell Green for throwing Jerry Rice to the ground during a tackle, turning Rice's reception into a 25-yard gain. Green was stunned by the penalty, stating he didn't realize the call was against him until he made his way to the sidelines. Near the end of the quarter, Redskins kicker Chip Lohmiller made a 44-yard field goal that put Washington back in front at 10–7.

Montana quickly rallied the 49ers back in the second quarter, leading them on an 80-yard scoring drive that saw San Francisco fool Washington with a halfback option play in which running back Harry Sydney completed a 28-yard pass to tight end Brent Jones. On the last play of the drive, Montana fired a 10-yard pass to Rice in the end zone, who caught the ball between two defenders to retake the lead for San Francisco at 14–10. The team was aided by another controversial call on the drive; Jones caught his 47-yard reception in the air and landed with a foot out of bounds, but officials ruled he had been forced out in the air by safety Alvin Walton. At the time, a reception made by a player forced out of bounds still counted as a catch. This rule was changed in 2008. Then after a punt, Montana again went to work, completing a 32-yard pass to halfback Roger Craig and a 47-yarder to Jones before finishing off the 89-yard possession with an 8-yard scoring toss to Mike Sherrard.

Sherrard's touchdown made the score 21–10 going into halftime, and it turned out to be the final score of the day for the offenses of both teams. Washington advanced inside the 49ers' 15-yard line three times in the second half, but failed to score on all of them. On their second possession of the half, they advanced 66 yards to the 49ers' 7-yard line before Johnnie Jackson picked off a third down pass intended for Monk in the end zone. Early in the fourth quarter, Monk caught three passes for 63 yards on a drive to the San Francisco 15, only to see Rypien get hit as he threw a pass, which floated right into the hands of cornerback Darryl Pollard. Linebacker Monte Colemanquickly gave the Redskins another chance to get back in the game, intercepting a pass from Montana and returning it 18 yards to the 49ers 19-yard line with 10:28 left in regulation. Faced with fourth down and 5 from the 14, Rypien threw the ball to receiver Gary Clark in the end zone. Eric Davis seemed to make contact with Clark before the ball arrived, but no flag was thrown and the pass fell incomplete, causing a turnover on downs. In the closing minutes of the game, 49ers linebacker Charles Haleydeflected a pass from Rypien into the arms of 295-pound defensive tackle Michael Carter, who rumbled 61 yards to the end zone to make the final score 28–10.

This was the third postseason meeting between the Redskins and 49ers. The teams split the previous two meetings.

==== NFC Championship: vs. (2) New York Giants ====
NFC Championship: (2) New York Giants at (1) San Francisco 49ers – Game summary

Quarter	1	2	3	4	Total
Giants	3	3	3	6	15
49ers	3	3	7	0	13

at Candlestick Park, San Francisco

- Date: January 20, 1991
- Game time: 4:00 p.m. EST/1:00 p.m. PST
- Game weather: 51 °F (11 °C), passing clouds
- Game attendance: 65,750
- Referee: Jerry Markbreit
- TV announcers (CBS): Pat Summerall and John Madden

Just like the regular season game between the two teams won by the 49ers 7–3, the championship game was mostly a defensive battle. San Francisco running back Roger Craig's fumble with 2:36 left in the game led to Giants kicker Matt Bahr's 42-yard game-winning field goal as time expired. Bahr was New York's only scorer with 5 (of 6) field goals. Despite not scoring a TD in eight quarters against the 49ers, the Giants moved on to Super Bowl XXV with their victory. The 49ers ended their season but in 1991 they missed playoffs finishing 10-6

== Awards and records ==
- Led NFC with 353 points scored
- Charles Haley, Led NFC, Sacks (16)
- Charles Haley, NFC Pro Bowl
- Ronnie Lott, NFC Pro Bowl
- Joe Montana, AP NFL MVP
- Joe Montana, Associated Press Athlete of the Year
- Joe Montana, NFC Pro Bowl Selection, Injured, did not play
- Joe Montana, Sports Illustrated Sportsman of the Year
- Guy McIntyre, NFC Pro Bowl
- Jerry Rice, NFL Leader, Receptions (100)
- Jerry Rice, NFL Leader, Receiving Yards (1,502)
- Jerry Rice, NFL Leader, Receiving Touchdowns (13)
- Jerry Rice, NFC Pro Bowl

=== Milestones ===
- Jerry Rice, First 100 reception season
