= Hartsville High School =

Location
- 701 Lewellyn Drive; Hartsville, South Carolina 29550; United States; 34.36143°N 80.08597°W

Information
- Type: Public
- Motto: "Preparing for the Future by learning Every Day"
- Established: 1961 (65 years ago)
- School district: Darlington County School District
- CEEB code: 410995
- Principal: Cory Lewis
- Teaching staff: 80.00 (FTE)
- Grades: 9–12
- Gender: Coeducational
- Enrollment: 1,125 (2023-2024)
- Student to teacher ratio: 14.06
- Campus: Suburban/rural
- Colors: Red, black, and white
- Athletics conference: 4-AAAA
- Mascot: Red Fox
- Accreditation: Southern Association for Secondary Schools and Colleges and South Carolina Department of Education
- Newspaper: Paw Prints
- Yearbook: Retrospect
- Website: hhs.dcsdschools.org

Hartsville High School is a public secondary school serving grades 9–12 located in Hartsville, South Carolina. 1,226 students attended Hartsville High for the 2017–2018 school year. It was founded in 1961.

Hartsville High is governed by the Darlington County School District and is accredited by the Southern Association for Secondary Schools and Colleges, as well as the South Carolina Department of Education.

Hartsville High's curriculum offers advanced placement, International Baccalaureate, honors, college preparatory, academic, and applied technology courses. Fine arts programs in band, chorus, drama, orchestra and visual arts are available, and the athletic department produces 22 varsity and junior varsity teams in 14 sports.

== Demographics ==
In the 2012–2013 school year, 1,254 students attended Hartsville High School. About 51% were male and about 49% were female. 52% of students at HHS were White/Caucasian, 44% were African-American, 0.4% were Asian, 0.1% were Hawaiian/Pacific Islander, 0.1% were American Indian/Alaskan Native, 2% were Hispanic, and 1% were mixed (two or more races). 48% of students were considered to be a part of a minority. 55% of students were considered economically disadvantaged, with 51% receiving free lunches and 4% receiving reduced-price lunches.

In the 2012–2013 school year, there were 426 ninth-grade students, 311 tenth-grade students, 279 eleventh-grade students, and 238 twelfth-grade students.

== Football player death ==
In October 2012, a lineman for the school's football team collapsed twice and ultimately died at the school's homecoming football game. Ronald Rouse, 18, a senior defensive end on the top-ranked Hartsville football team, collapsed on the field during the second quarter of a homecoming game against Crestwood High School hat Kelleytown Stadium. He was revived and was able to speak after the first collapse and started walking, but could not be revived after the second collapse, and was declared dead at a nearby hospital. His jersey is framed in the entrance of the Red Fox arena.

== Notable alumni ==
- Roderick Blakney "MooMoo" – former professional basketball player
- Cam Cannarella; baseball player
- Albert Haynesworth – former NFL defensive lineman
- Terrance Herrington – former middle-distance ACC track champion and US Olympic athlete
- Shannon Johnson, "Pee Wee" – former professional basketball player, WNBA All Star, and member of gold medal-winning USA Basketball team in the 2004 Summer Olympics
- Jordan Lyles – professional baseball player for MLB's Milwaukee Brewers
- Bobo Newson – former professional baseball player. He was a four-time all-star and won a ring in the 1947 World Series.
- Craig Thompson – former NFL tight end
