= 1991 Pro Bowl =

National Football League all-star game

1991 NFL Pro Bowl
AFC	NFC
23	21
Head coach: Art Shell (Los Angeles Raiders)	Head coach: George Seifert (San Francisco 49ers)
	1	2	3	4	Total
AFC	3	0	3	17	23
NFC	0	7	7	7	21
- Date: February 3, 1991
- Stadium: Aloha Stadium; Honolulu, Hawaii
- MVP: Jim Kelly (Buffalo Bills)
- Referee: Gordon McCarter
- Attendance: 50,345

TV in the United States
- Network: ESPN
- Announcers: Mike Patrick, Joe Theismann & Chris Berman

The 1991 Pro Bowl was the NFL's 41st annual all-star game which featured the outstanding performers from the 1990 season. The game was played on Sunday, February 3, 1991, at Aloha Stadium in Honolulu, Hawaii before a crowd of 50,345. The final score was AFC 23, NFC 21 with Morten Andersen's field goal attempt being blocked by Jeff Cross as time expired to seal an AFC victory.

Art Shell of the Los Angeles Raiders led the AFC team against an NFC team coached by San Francisco 49ers head coach George Seifert. The referee was Gordon McCarter.

Quarterback Jim Kelly of the Buffalo Bills was named the game's Most Valuable Player. Players on the winning AFC team received $10,000 apiece while the NFC participants each took home $5,000.

== AFC roster ==
=== Offense ===
Position	Starter(s)	Reserve(s)
Quarterback	1 Warren Moon, Houston	12 Jim Kelly, Buffalo
Running back	34 Thurman Thomas, Buffalo; 26 Bobby Humphrey, Denver	35 Marion Butts, San Diego; 21 James Brooks, Cincinnati; 34 Bo Jackson, L.A. Raiders
Fullback	35 John Williams, Seattle	
Wide receiver	83 Andre Reed, Buffalo; 83 Anthony Miller, San Diego	81 Ernest Givens, Houston; 85 Drew Hill, Houston
Tight end	82 Rodney Holman, Cincinnati	80 Ferrell Edmunds, Miami
Offensive tackle	78 Anthony Muñoz, Cincinnati; 78 Bruce Armstrong, New England	69 Will Wolford, Buffalo; 78 Richmond Webb, Miami
Offensive guard	63 Mike Munchak, Houston; 74 Bruce Matthews, Houston	76 Steve Wisniewski, L. A. Raiders
Center	67 Kent Hull, Buffalo	72 Don Mosebar, L. A. Raiders

=== Defense ===
Position	Starter(s)	Reserve(s)
Defensive end	93 Greg Townsend, L. A. Raiders; 78 Bruce Smith, Buffalo	91 Jeff Cross, Miami
Defensive tackle	92 Michael Dean Perry, Cleveland	79 Ray Childress, Houston
Outside linebacker	91 Leslie O'Neal, San Diego; 58 Derrick Thomas, Kansas City	56 Darryl Talley, Buffalo
Inside linebacker	58 Shane Conlan, Buffalo; 50 David Little, Pittsburgh	97 Cornelius Bennett, Buffalo; 59 Mike Johnson, Cleveland
Cornerback	29 Albert Lewis, Kansas City; 26 Rod Woodson, Pittsburgh	31 Kevin Ross, Kansas City
Free safety	27 Steve Atwater, Denver	
Strong safety	33 David Fulcher, Cincinnati	49 Dennis Smith, Denver

=== Special teams ===
Position	Starter(s)	Reserve(s)
Punter	3 Rohn Stark, Indianapolis	
Placekicker	7 Nick Lowery, Kansas City	
Kick returner	88 Clarence Verdin, Indianapolis	
Special teamer	89 Steve Tasker, Buffalo	

== NFC roster ==
=== Offense ===
Position	Starter(s)	Reserve(s)
Quarterback	16 Joe Montana, San Francisco	12 Randall Cunningham, Philadelphia; 11 Jim Everett, L.A. Rams
Running back	20 Barry Sanders, Detroit	35 Neal Anderson, Chicago; 39 Johnny Johnson, Phoenix; 25 Emmitt Smith, Dallas
Fullback	21 Earnest Byner, Washington	
Wide receiver	80 Jerry Rice, San Francisco; 84 Sterling Sharpe, Green Bay	84 Gary Clark, Washington; 80 Andre Rison, Atlanta
Tight end	88 Keith Jackson, Philadelphia	83 Steve Jordan, Minnesota
Offensive tackle	78 Jackie Slater, L. A. Rams; 79 Jim Lachey, Washington	75 Lomas Brown, Detroit
Offensive guard	64 Randall McDaniel, Minnesota; 62 Guy McIntyre, San Francisco	62 Mark Bortz, Chicago; 66 William Roberts, N. Y. Giants
Center	63 Jay Hilgenberg, Chicago	65 Bart Oates, N. Y. Giants

=== Defense ===
Position	Starter(s)	Reserve(s)
Defensive end	56 Chris Doleman, Minnesota; 92 Reggie White, Philadelphia	95 Richard Dent, Chicago
Defensive tackle	93 Jerry Ball, Detroit; 99 Jerome Brown, Philadelphia	74 Erik Howard, N. Y. Giants
Outside linebacker	56 Lawrence Taylor, N. Y. Giants; 94 Charles Haley, San Francisco	56 Pat Swilling, New Orleans
Inside linebacker	50 Mike Singletary, Chicago; 52 Pepper Johnson, N. Y. Giants	54 Chris Spielman, Detroit; 53 Vaughan Johnson, New Orleans
Cornerback	28 Darrell Green, Washington; 39 Carl Lee, Minnesota	45 Wayne Haddix, Tampa Bay
Free safety	42 Ronnie Lott, San Francisco	20 Mark Carrier, Chicago
Strong safety	47 Joey Browner, Minnesota	

=== Special teams ===
Position	Starter(s)	Reserve(s)
Punter	5 Sean Landeta, N. Y. Giants	
Placekicker	7 Morten Anderson, New Orleans	
Kick returner	23 Mel Gray, Detroit	
Special teamer	21 Reyna Thompson, N. Y. Giants	
