= Rodney Holman =

American football player (born 1960)

No. 82
- Position: Tight end

Personal information
- Born: April 20, 1960 (age 66); Ypsilanti, Michigan, U.S.
- Listed height: 6 ft 3 in (1.91 m)
- Listed weight: 238 lb (108 kg)

Career information
- High school: Ypsilanti (Ypsilanti, Michigan)
- College: Tulane
- NFL draft: 1982: 3rd round, 82nd overall pick

Career history
- Cincinnati Bengals (1982–1992); Detroit Lions (1993–1995)

Awards and highlights
- 3× Second-team All-Pro (1988–1990); 3× Pro Bowl (1988–1990); Second-team All-American (1981)

Career NFL statistics
- Receptions: 365
- Receiving yards: 4,771
- Receiving touchdowns: 36
- Stats at Pro Football Reference

Rodney Alan Holman (born April 20, 1960) is an American former professional football player who was a tight end for the Cincinnati Bengals (1982–1992), and the Detroit Lions (1993–1995) of the National Football League (NFL).

== Biography ==
Holman was born in Ypsilanti, Michigan and graduated from Ypsilanti High School in 1978 where he starred on the football team and was an all-state wrestler. Before his NFL career, Holman played college football at Tulane University. Holman started all four of his seasons at Tulane, setting school records for receptions (135) and receiving yards (1,512) by a tight end. His 47 receptions in 1979 set a single season school record for catching by a tight end as well. In his four seasons on the team, The Green Wave posted a 26–20 record, and made it to consecutive Bowl games for the first time. Future NFL kicker Eddie Murray was also a member of the team around that time.

He was selected 82nd overall by the Bengals in the third round of the 1982 NFL draft. A 3-time Pro Bowl selection from 1988 to 1990, Holman's blocking and pass catching abilities helped lead the Bengals to an AFC Championship and appearance in Super Bowl XXIII.

By the time he retired in 1996, Holman had played in 213 games, the second most games played by a tight end in NFL history behind Pete Metzelaars (234). In his 14 seasons, Holman amassed 365 receptions for 4,771 yards and 36 touchdowns. As of 2005, Holman's 318 receptions with the Bengals are the most ever by a tight end in franchise history and ranks him as their 6th all-time leading receiver. After his NFL career ended, Holman served as an assistant coach for the New Orleans Saints from 1998 to 1999.

== NFL career statistics ==
Legend
| **Bold** | Career high |

=== Regular season ===
| Year | Team | Games | | Receiving | | | | |
| Year | Team | GP | GS | Rec | Yds | Avg | Lng | TD |
|---|---|---|---|---|---|---|---|---|
| 1982 | CIN | 9 | 0 | 3 | 18 | 6.0 | 10 | 1 |
| 1983 | CIN | **16** | 0 | 2 | 15 | 7.5 | 10 | 0 |
| 1984 | CIN | **16** | 2 | 21 | 239 | 11.4 | 27 | 1 |
| 1985 | CIN | **16** | **16** | 38 | 479 | 12.6 | 64 | 7 |
| 1986 | CIN | **16** | **16** | 40 | 570 | 14.3 | 34 | 2 |
| 1987 | CIN | 12 | 12 | 28 | 438 | **15.6** | 61 | 2 |
| 1988 | CIN | **16** | **16** | 39 | 527 | 13.5 | 33 | 3 |
| 1989 | CIN | **16** | 15 | **50** | **736** | 14.7 | **73** | **9** |
| 1990 | CIN | **16** | 15 | 40 | 596 | 14.9 | 53 | 5 |
| 1991 | CIN | **16** | 15 | 31 | 445 | 14.4 | 39 | 2 |
| 1992 | CIN | **16** | 13 | 26 | 266 | 10.2 | 26 | 2 |
| 1993 | DET | **16** | **16** | 25 | 244 | 9.8 | 28 | 2 |
| 1994 | DET | 15 | 7 | 17 | 163 | 9.6 | 18 | 0 |
| 1995 | DET | **16** | 3 | 5 | 35 | 7.0 | 9 | 0 |
| | | 212 | 146 | 365 | 4,771 | 13.1 | 73 | 36 |

=== Playoffs ===
| Year | Team | Games | | Receiving | | | | |
| Year | Team | GP | GS | Rec | Yds | Avg | Lng | TD |
|---|---|---|---|---|---|---|---|---|
| 1982 | CIN | 1 | 0 | 0 | 0 | 0.0 | 0 | 0 |
| 1988 | CIN | **3** | **3** | **7** | 82 | 11.7 | 24 | 0 |
| 1990 | CIN | 2 | 2 | 4 | **102** | **25.5** | **46** | 0 |
| 1993 | DET | 1 | 1 | 3 | 31 | 10.3 | 16 | 0 |
| 1994 | DET | 1 | 1 | 4 | 30 | 7.5 | 12 | 0 |
| 1995 | DET | 1 | 0 | 0 | 0 | 0.0 | 0 | 0 |
| | | 9 | 7 | 18 | 245 | 13.6 | 46 | 0 |

== Honors ==
Holman was inducted into the Tulane Hall Of Fame in 1990, and the Greater New Orleans Sports Hall of Fame in 2013.

== Family life ==
Holman and his wife Sandra have two daughters, Rachael and Shayla. As of 2014, he is retired and living in Slidell, Louisiana.
