= Darryl Pollard =

American football player (born 1964)

No. 36, 26, 31
- Position: Cornerback

Personal information
- Born: May 11, 1964 (age 62); Ellsworth, Maine, U.S.
- Listed height: 5 ft 11 in (1.80 m)
- Listed weight: 187 lb (85 kg)

Career information
- High school: Mitchell (Colorado Springs, Colorado)
- College: Weber State
- NFL draft: 1986: undrafted

Career history
- Seattle Seahawks (1986)*; San Francisco 49ers (1987, 1988-1991); Tampa Bay Buccaneers (1992–1993); San Jose SaberCats (1995)
- * Offseason or practice squad member only

Awards and highlights
- 2× Super Bowl champion (XXIII, XXIV)

Career NFL statistics
- Interceptions: 4
- Fumble recoveries: 1
- Stats at Pro Football Reference

Cedric Darryl Pollard (born May 11, 1964) is an American former professional football player who was a cornerback for seven seasons in the National Football League (NFL). His listed highlights are the Super Bowl XXIII and XXIV championships, and playing on an undefeated Colorado State High School Championship team in 1981.

== Student athletics ==
Pollard played as a wide receiver and return specialist at William Mitchell High School in Colorado Springs, Colorado. The team were undefeated state champions in 1981.

Pollard played college football at Weber State University for three years (1983–1985). He came to Weber State as a running back but was moved to cornerback prior to his sophomore season. He led the Wildcats with four interceptions as a senior, earning all-conference honors. Pollard was rated as the 24th defensive cornerback in the National Collegiate Athletic Association (NCAA) to be chosen for the 1986 NFL draft.

== Professional career ==
Pollard was originally signed as a free agent by the Seattle Seahawks on May 3, 1986, but was waived. He was signed during the next off-season by the San Francisco 49ers on April 10, 1987, but repeatedly released, waived, and re-signed, before gaining a stable place on the organization's roster from September 1988 to August 1992.

In the 1988 season, Pollard took part in 14 games as part of the core special teams and playing in nickel-and-dime packages. He made 23 tackles and four pass deflections. He also played in all post-season games. Pollard made an alert recovery of John Taylor's fumble of a punt return in Super Bowl XXIII against Cincinnati.

In the 1989 season, Pollard started as the left cornerback, starting in 14 games and playing 16. He recorded career-highs in tackles (79), solo tackles (75) and passes defensed (12), and led the team with 22 special team stops. Pollard contributed seven tackles and three passes defensed in the NFC Divisional Playoff game vs. Minnesota, and started in Super Bowl XXIV with one recorded sack against John Elway.

Pollard started all 16 games in the 1990 season at left cornerback, instrumental in victories which brought the 49ers to the NFC Championship Game. He spent the entire 1991 season on injured reserve after breaking his left ankle in the first half of a pre-season game at Seattle, August 23.

The 49ers placed Pollard on waivers on August 31, 1992, and the Tampa Bay Buccaneers claimed him the next day. He played all 16 games of the 1992 season for the Buccaneers as a cornerback, nickel back and special teamer. Pollard achieved a career-high in interceptions, including a 75-yard return to set-up a Buccaneer touchdown against the Chicago Bears.

Pollard spent the entire 1993 season on injured reserve after being diagnosed with a herniated disk in his neck after a pre-season game against the Denver Broncos. Pollard retired from the NFL in 1994.

In 1995, Pollard joined the Arena Football League, signing a one-year contract with the San Jose SaberCats as a defensive back and wide receiver.

== Retirement ==
Pollard is the district production sales manager in Northern California for Océ North America, Inc. and resides in San Francisco, California.

In 2009, Pollard and other former 49er teammates (including Guy McIntyre, Ray Wersching and Steve Bono) participated in a 49ers VISA Signature Day Football Fantasy Camp. They allowed several individuals to participate in football drills on the team's practice field in Santa Clara, California.
