= Lynn James =

American gridiron football player (born 1967)

No. 80, 40
- Position: Wide receiver

Personal information
- Born: January 25, 1965 (age 61); Navasota, Texas, U.S.
- Listed height: 6 ft 0 in (1.83 m)
- Listed weight: 191 lb (87 kg)

Career information
- High school: Navasota
- College: SMU, Arizona State
- NFL draft: 1990: 5th round, 122nd overall pick

Career history
- Cincinnati Bengals (1990–1991); Cleveland Browns (1991); Winnipeg Blue Bombers (1992); Los Angeles Rams (1993)*
- * Offseason or practice squad member only

Career NFL statistics
- Receptions: 10
- Receiving yards: 139
- Touchdowns: 1
- Stats at Pro Football Reference

Lynn James (born January 25, 1965) is an American former professional football player who was a wide receiver in the National Football League (NFL). He played for the Cincinnati Bengals from 1990 to 1991, the Cleveland Browns in 1992 and the Winnipeg Blue Bombers in 1992. He was selected by the Bengals in the fifth round of the 1990 NFL draft. He played college football for the SMU Mustangs and Arizona State Sun Devils.
