= Don Odegard =

American gridiron football player (born 1966)

No. 21, 28, 23
- Position: Cornerback

Personal information
- Born: November 22, 1966 (age 59); Seattle, Washington, U.S.
- Listed height: 6 ft 0 in (1.83 m)
- Listed weight: 180 lb (82 kg)

Career information
- High school: Kennewick (Kennewick, Washington)
- College: Oregon State; UNLV
- NFL draft: 1990: 6th round, 150th overall pick

Career history
- Cincinnati Bengals (1990)*; New York Jets (1990–1992); Hamilton Tiger-Cats (1994); Memphis Mad Dogs (1995); Toronto Argonauts (1996)
- * Offseason or practice squad member only

Career NFL statistics
- Return yards: 195
- Stats at Pro Football Reference

Donald Boyd Odegard (born November 22, 1966) is an American former professional football player who was a cornerback in the National Football League (NFL) and Canadian Football League (CFL). HJe played college football for the Oregon State Beavers and UNLV Rebels.

== Career ==
Odegard played college football at Oregon State University and later at the University of Nevada, Las Vegas, and was selected in the sixth round (150th overall) by the Cincinnati Bengals in the 1990 NFL draft. He was waived in preseason, and was picked up by the New York Jets. He played in 14 games for the Jets in the 1990 season, and another 16 for them in 1991.
