= Craig Thompson (tight end) =

American football player (born 1969)

No. 48
- Position: Tight end

Personal information
- Born: January 13, 1969 (age 57); Hartsville, South Carolina, U.S.
- Listed height: 6 ft 2 in (1.88 m)
- Listed weight: 244 lb (111 kg)

Career information
- High school: Hartsville
- College: North Carolina A&T (1989–1991)
- NFL draft: 1992: 5th round, 115th overall pick

Career history
- Cincinnati Bengals (1992–1993); Pittsburgh Steelers (1995)*; Jacksonville Jaguars (1996)*
- * Offseason or practice squad member only

Career NFL statistics
- Receptions: 36
- Receiving yards: 281
- Touchdowns: 3
- Stats at Pro Football Reference

Craig Antonio Thompson (born January 13, 1969) is an American former professional football player who was a tight end for the Cincinnati Bengals of the National Football League (NFL). He played college football for the North Carolina A&T Aggies and was selected by the Bengals in the fifth round of the 1992 NFL draft with the 115th overall pick.
