= Kirk Scrafford =

American football player (born 1967)

No. 76
- Positions: Tackle, guard

Personal information
- Born: March 15, 1967 (age 59); Billings, Montana, U.S.
- Listed height: 6 ft 6 in (1.98 m)
- Listed weight: 270 lb (122 kg)

Career information
- High school: Billings West
- College: Montana
- NFL draft: 1990: undrafted

Career history
- Cincinnati Bengals (1990–1992); Denver Broncos (1993–1994); San Francisco 49ers (1995–1998)

Career NFL statistics
- Games played: 99
- Games started: 52
- Fumble recoveries: 1
- Stats at Pro Football Reference

Kirk Tippet Scrafford (born March 13, 1967) is an American former professional football player who was an offensive lineman for nine seasons in the National Football League (NFL) for the Cincinnati Bengals, Denver Broncos, and San Francisco 49ers. Scrafford played college football for the Montana Grizzlies, starting in a school-record 43 consecutive games. He was named an All-American as a senior in 1989.

After he graduated from Montana, Scrafford went undrafted, but signed with the Bengals as a free agent. He made his first start as a rookie in the 1990–91 NFL playoffs against the Los Angeles Raiders, where he faced the daunting task of blocking stars like Greg Townsend and Howie Long. “I remember Howie said to me, ‘Shouldn't you be playing baseball instead?’” Scrafford said. “LA was an intimidating scene in those days. Everyone in the stands looked like they’d just gotten a ticket out of jail. There were more fights in the stands than there were on the field.” The Bengals lost the game, 20–10, with Long and Townsend racking up a combined total of four sacks.

Scrafford played infrequently for the Bengals until 1992. The following year, he joined the Broncos, where he played in all 32 games with them over his two seasons in Denver. In 1995, he joined the San Francisco 49ers, where he spent the remainder of his career. He started 11 games with them in 1995 and all 16 games in 1997 A persistent neck injury eventually bothered him enough that he decided to retire after the 1997 season, but midway through 1998, his 49er teammates talked him into coming back for one more playoff run. Scrafford played in a total of 99 regular season games in the NFL (starting in 52), and 10 games in the playoffs.
