= Stanford Jennings =

American football player (born 1962)

No. 36, 28
- Position: Running back

Personal information
- Born: March 12, 1962 (age 64); Summerville, South Carolina, U.S.
- Listed height: 6 ft 1 in (1.85 m)
- Listed weight: 205 lb (93 kg)

Career information
- High school: Summerville
- College: Furman
- NFL draft: 1984: 3rd round, 65th overall pick

Career history
- Cincinnati Bengals (1984–1990); New Orleans Saints (1991); Tampa Bay Buccaneers (1992)

Career NFL statistics
- Rushing yards: 1,250
- Rushing average: 4
- Receptions: 116
- Receiving yards: 1,096
- Total touchdowns: 20
- Stats at Pro Football Reference

Stanford Jamison Jennings (born March 12, 1962) is an American former professional football player who was a running back in the National Football League (NFL). He played college football for the Furman Paladins and was selected in the third round of the 1984 NFL draft. Jennings played seven seasons in the NFL for the Cincinnati Bengals (1984–1990), and one each for the New Orleans Saints (1991) and the Tampa Bay Buccaneers (1992). Jennings returned a kickoff 93 yards for a touchdown in Super Bowl XXIII.

== Early life ==
Jennings was born to Walter and Fannie Jennings, both laborers on a dairy farm. He attended Summerville High School in Summerville, South Carolina. In three seasons with Jennings at tailback, Summerville lost only two games—none his junior and senior seasons—and he led the Green Wave to back-to-back Class 4A state titles in 1978–79. Jennings, who split time with two other tailbacks, was not heavily recruited by college programs. His final choices were The Citadel and Furman University.

== College career ==
Jennings selected Furman, helping the Paladins win Southern Conference championships each of his four seasons. Furman went 36–9–2 during Jennings's stay, with shocking wins over South Carolina and Georgia Tech. Jennings starred at Furman—in four seasons, he rushed for 3,868 yards on 650 carries (a 6.0 average) and 39 touchdowns, with 76 receptions for 865 yards (an 11.4 average) and four receiving touchdowns. He was the 1981 SoCon Player of the Year

== Professional career ==
Jennings was chosen in the third round of the 1984 NFL draft by the Cincinnati Bengals. Primarily a kick returner and backup running back, he had his most productive season from scrimmage his rookie year of 1984. He played 15 games (starting four) and rushing for 379 yards on 79 attempts (a 4.8 average) and two touchdowns and caught 35 passes for 346 yards and two receiving touchdowns—all career bests. His top year as a kick returner was 1988, with career highs of 32 returns for 684 yards, including a 98-yard touchdown return (the longest of the season in the NFL) against the Kansas City Chiefs. He returned a 93-yard kickoff in Super Bowl XXIII against the San Francisco 49ers.

Jennings finished his nine-season NFL career with 1,250 rushing yards, 116 receptions for 1,098 yards, and 2,965 yards returning kickoffs. He also scored 20 touchdowns. His 2,752 kickoff return yards with Cincinnati stood as a Bengals franchise record until surpassed by Tremain Mack in 2000.

== Personal life ==
Jennings and his wife, Kathy, live in a northern suburb of Atlanta, Georgia, with their children Jamie and Kelsey Amanda. He is a regional sales manager for New Balance shoes.

Jennings's younger brother, Keith Jennings, played tight end in the NFL.
