= Mitchell Price =

American football player (born 1967)

No. 32, 26, 27
- Position: Defensive back

Personal information
- Born: May 10, 1967 (age 59); Jacksonville, Texas, U.S.
- Listed height: 5 ft 9 in (1.75 m)
- Listed weight: 181 lb (82 kg)

Career information
- High school: James Madison (San Antonio, Texas)
- College: SMU; Tulane
- NFL draft: 1990: 9th round, 234th overall pick

Career history
- Cincinnati Bengals (1990–1992); Phoenix Cardinals (1992); Cincinnati Bengals (1992-1993); Los Angeles Rams (1993)

Career NFL statistics
- Games played: 41
- Stats at Pro Football Reference

Mitchell Labraie Price (born May 10, 1967) is an American former professional football player who played defensive back for the Cincinnati Bengals, Arizona Cardinals, and Los Angeles Rams He was selected by the Bengals in the ninth round of the 1990 NFL draft. 2nd Team All-South Independent 1987, 1989
