= Eric Ball (American football) =

American football player (born 1966)

No. 42
- Position: Running back

Personal information
- Born: July 1, 1966 (age 60); Cleveland, Ohio, U.S.
- Listed height: 6 ft 2 in (1.88 m)
- Listed weight: 218 lb (99 kg)

Career information
- High school: Ypsilanti (Ypsilanti Township, Michigan)
- College: UCLA
- NFL draft: 1989: 2nd round, 35th overall pick
- Expansion draft: 1995: 34th round, 65th overall pick

Career history
- Cincinnati Bengals (1989–1994); Carolina Panthers (1995)*; Oakland Raiders (1995)
- * Offseason or practice squad member only

Awards and highlights
- Second-team All-Pac-10 (1988); Rose Bowl MVP (1986); Rose Bowl Hall of Fame (1996)

Career NFL statistics
- Rushing yards: 586
- Rushing average: 3.7
- Rushing touchdowns: 8
- Stats at Pro Football Reference

Eric Clinton Ball (born July 1, 1966) is an American former professional football player who was running back for seven seasons with the Cincinnati Bengals and Oakland Raiders of the National Football League (NFL). He played college football for the UCLA Bruins.

== College career ==
Ball played at the University of California, Los Angeles from 1985 through 1988. He tied a Rose Bowl record in the 1986 Rose Bowl by scoring four touchdowns for the Bruins against the Iowa Hawkeyes, rushed for 227 yards, and was voted the game's MVP. He was named to the Rose Bowl Hall of Fame in 1996.

While at UCLA, Ball had two notable fumbles in very important games. In the November 23, 1985 USC vs UCLA game, with the Rose Bowl on the line for the Bruins, Ball lost the ball on the 1-yard line in the fourth quarter as he dived for the end zone with what would have been the winning touchdown. Marcus Cotton grabbed the fumble for USC and the Trojans would win 17–13. Ball also had a crucial fumble in the UCLA vs Washington State game in 1988, when the #1 ranked Bruins were upset at home by the Cougars 34–30.

Ball helped the Bruins go 4-0 in Bowl Games during his college career - 1986 Rose Bowl, 1986 Freedom Bowl, 1987 Aloha Bowl, 1989 Cotton Bowl Classic, including two Pac-10 Championships (1985, 1987).

== Professional career ==
Ball was selected in the second round of the 1989 NFL Draft with the 35th overall pick by the Bengals. Ball played mostly as a kick returner for the Bengals, returning 115 kicks over 97 games for a total of 2,474 return yards. In 1995, he was selected by the Carolina Panthers in the 1995 NFL expansion draft but did not make the roster. He signed with the Oakland Raiders and played one season with them.

== Post-playing career ==
Ball currently serves as the Cincinnati Bengals director of player personnel. https://theorg.com/org/cincinnati-bengals/org-chart/eric-ball
