= James Francis (American football) =

American football player (born 1968)

No. 50, 51
- Position: Linebacker

Personal information
- Born: August 4, 1968 (age 58); Houston, Texas, U.S.
- Listed height: 6 ft 5 in (1.96 m)
- Listed weight: 253 lb (115 kg)

Career information
- High school: La Marque (La Marque, Texas)
- College: Baylor (1986-1989)
- NFL draft: 1990: 1st round, 12th overall pick

Career history
- Cincinnati Bengals (1990–1998); Washington Redskins (1999)

Awards and highlights
- PFWA NFL All-Rookie Team (1990); First-team All-American (1989); SWC Defensive Player of the Year (1989); First-team All-SWC (1989); 2× Second-team All-SWC (1987, 1988)

Career NFL statistics
- Total tackles: 562
- Sacks: 33.5
- Forced fumbles: 11
- Fumble recoveries: 8
- Interceptions: 11
- Interception yards: 205
- Defensive touchdowns: 3
- Stats at Pro Football Reference

James Henry Francis (born August 4, 1968) is an American former professional football player who was a linebacker in the National Football League (NFL) for the Cincinnati Bengals and Washington Redskins. He played college football for the Baylor Bears and was selected by the Bengals in the first round of the 1990 NFL draft.
