= David Fulcher =

American football player and coach (born 1964)

- Fulcher in 2008

No. 33, 45
- Position: Safety

Personal information
- Born: September 28, 1964 (age 62); Los Angeles, California, U.S.
- Listed height: 6 ft 3 in (1.91 m)
- Listed weight: 236 lb (107 kg)

Career information
- High school: John C. Fremont (Los Angeles)
- College: Arizona State (1983–1985)
- NFL draft: 1986: 3rd round, 78th overall pick

Career history

Playing
- Cincinnati Bengals (1986–1992); Los Angeles Raiders (1993); Kansas City Chiefs (1995)*
- * Offseason or practice squad member only

Coaching
- Cincinnati Christian (2016–2017) Head coach

Awards and highlights
- First-team All-Pro (1989); Second-team All-Pro (1990); 3× Pro Bowl (1988–1990); PFWA NFL All-Rookie Team (1986); Cincinnati Bengals 40th Anniversary Team; Cincinnati Bengals 50th Anniversary Team; 2× Consensus All-American (1984, 1985); 3× First-team All-Pac-10 (1983–1985)

Career NFL statistics
- Interceptions: 31
- Interception yards: 246
- Fumble recoveries: 9
- Sacks: 8.5
- Safeties: 1
- Defensive touchdowns: 2
- Stats at Pro Football Reference

Head coaching record
- Career: 0–22 (.000)
- College Football Hall of Fame

David Dwayne Fulcher (born September 28, 1964) is an American former professional football player who was a safety for the Cincinnati Bengals and Los Angeles Raiders of the National Football League (NFL). He played college football for the Arizona State Sun Devils. He was inducted into the College Football Hall of Fame in 2021.

== College career ==
After graduating from John C. Fremont Senior High School in Los Angeles, Fulcher played college football at Arizona State University. While playing for the Sun Devils, Fulcher was known for his cover skills and punishing tackles. He earned the nickname "Fo-Rock" after tackling an opposing wide receiver in a game against New Mexico State University. "The guy laid there for a while, then got up and was dizzy. Then he said 'Man, I feel like I ran into a rock,'" Fulcher explained. "My teammates started calling me 'Rock'. A lot of people, when they pronounce my last name, say 'Fo-cher. So I just put the 'Fo' in front of Rock."

After his junior season was over in 1986, Fulcher declared himself eligible for the NFL draft. He finished his three seasons at Arizona State with 12 interceptions, 4 as a freshman, 2 as a sophomore, and 6 as a junior. He returned them for 193 yards and a touchdown.

In 2021 he was inducted into the College Football Hall of Fame.

== NFL career ==
Fulcher was selected by the Bengals in the third round of the 1986 NFL Draft. After just two NFL seasons, Fulcher was viewed as one of the top defensive backs in the NFL.

In 1988, he recorded five interceptions and one touchdown, and earned his first trip to the Pro Bowl. The Bengals finished the season with a 12–4 record and went on to face the San Francisco 49ers in Super Bowl XXIII, where they ended up losing narrowly to the 49ers 20–16 after quarterback Joe Montana threw the game-winning touchdown pass with 34 seconds left. In the game, Fulcher recorded several key tackles, a sack and forced a fumble that the Bengals recovered. Fulcher later said this game was his most memorable NFL moment. "It was the time they called my name during the introductions at the Super Bowl," he said. "Walking out of the tunnel at Joe Robbie Stadium, making sure I did not trip on the turf and fall down."

In 1989, Fulcher recorded eight interceptions, at the time the second-highest single-season total by a Bengals player. He also tied a Bengals record by recording three interceptions in one game, a feat he accomplished twice. Fulcher once again was selected to play in the Pro Bowl, but the Bengals finished the year with an 8–8 record and failed to make the playoffs.

In 1990 Fulcher made the Pro Bowl for the third year in a row. He intercepted four passes, forced three fumbles and recorded 53 solo tackles. The Bengals finished the season 9-7 and made it to the divisional playoffs, with Fulcher recording an interception in both of their playoff games. This would be the last winning season Fulcher would have playing for the Bengals, as they would not record a winning record again until 2005. In 1991, he led the team with 68 solo tackles, four forced fumbles (recovering three of them) and he intercepted four passes, returning them for 51 yards and a touchdown. In his final season in Cincinnati in 1992, he intercepted three passes and recovered five fumbles.

Fulcher joined the Raiders as a free agent in 1993, but due to injuries he only played three games, and retired after the season. In his eight NFL seasons, Fulcher recorded 10 forced fumbles, nine fumble recoveries, 12 fumble-return yards, 31 interceptions, 246 interception return yards and two touchdowns. His 31 interceptions are the third most in Bengals history behind Ken Riley and Louis Breeden.

== After the NFL ==
Fulcher was named sixth on a list of "All-Time Cincinnati Bengals" in 2017. He is active in fundraising and awareness activities, especially for multiple sclerosis, and founded the non-profit MANA (Mentoring Against Negative Actions), working with inmates to teach them life skills. Fulcher is also the Alumni President for the Walter Camp Football Foundation.

Fulcher served as head football coach at Cincinnati Christian High School from 2011 through 2015.

On June 1, 2015, Fulcher was announced as the head coach at Cincinnati Christian University for their inaugural 2016 season.

Fulcher is married and has two children and three grandchildren.

== Head coaching record ==
=== College ===
Year	Team	Overall	Conference	Standing	Bowl/playoffs
Cincinnati Christian Eagles (Mid-South Conference) (2016–2017)
2016	Cincinnati Christian	0–11	0–6	7th (East)	
2017	Cincinnati Christian	0–11	0–6	7th (Bluegrass)	
Cincinnati Christian:		0–22	0–12		
Total:		0–22			

== Sources ==
- Ludwig, Chick (2004). Cincinnati Bengals, The Legends. Willmington, OH: Orange Frazer Press. ISBN 1-882203-38-0.
