= Cincinnati Bengals all-time roster =

1,152 players have appeared in at least one regular season or postseason game in the National Football League (NFL) or American Football League (AFL) for the Cincinnati Bengals since 1968. This list is accurate through the end of the 2025 NFL season.

== A ==
- Khalid Abdullah
- Blue Adams
- Doug Adams
- Sam Adams
- Hakeem Adeniji
- Cal Adomitis
- Freedom Akinmoladun
- Charles Alexander
- Mackensie Alexander
- Alton Alexis
- Mario Alford
- Erick All
- Brandon Allen
- Jason Allen
- Ricardo Allen
- Ashley Ambrose
- Marty Amsler
- Jamaal Anderson
- Jerry Anderson
- Ken Anderson
- Tycen Anderson
- Willie Anderson
- Stacy Andrews
- Daijahn Anthony
- Eli Apple
- Dan Archer
- JoJuan Armour
- Doug Aronson
- Mike Arthur
- Brian Asamoah
- Devin Asiasi
- Matthias Askew
- Geno Atkins
- Ken Avery
- Chidobe Awuzie

== B ==
- Martin Baccaglio
- Joe Bachie
- Coy Bacon
- Chris Bahr
- Markus Bailey
- Thomas Bailey
- Eric Ball
- Estes Banks
- Michael Bankston
- Chris Barber
- Michael Barber
- Leo Barker
- Tom Barndt
- Michael Basnight
- Don Bass
- Jessie Bates
- Marco Battaglia
- Jordan Battle
- Ralph Battle
- Rashad Bauman
- Robert Bean
- Al Beauchamp
- Rogers Beckett
- Brandon Bell
- Len Bell
- Myron Bell
- Vonn Bell
- Ryan Benjamin
- Antoine Bennett
- Ben Bennett
- Brandon Bennett
- Fred Bennett
- Cedric Benson
- Ray Bentley
- Bill Bergey
- Giovani Bernard
- Royce Berry
- Bill Berthusen
- Eric Bieniemy
- Andrew Billings
- Lewis Billups
- Christo Bilukidi
- Armon Binns
- Ken Blackman
- Roosevelt Blackmon
- Darryl Blackstock
- Lyle Blackwood
- Brian Blados
- Michael Blair
- Jeff Blake
- Amani Bledsoe
- Russell Bodine
- Patrick Body
- Michael Boley
- Clint Boling
- Vaughn Booker
- Nate Borders
- Jerry Boyarsky
- LaVell Boyd
- Tyler Boyd
- Danny Brabham
- Chuck Bradley
- Ed Brady
- Rich Braham
- David Braxton
- Jim Breech
- Louis Breeden
- Adrian Breen
- Brian Brennan
- Mike Brennan
- Sean Brewer
- Will Brice
- Greg Bright
- Gary Brightwell
- Darrick Brilz
- Mike Brim
- Kevin Brock
- Ahmad Brooks
- Billy Brooks
- Greg Brooks
- James Brooks
- Tahj Brooks
- Steve Broussard
- Andrew Brown
- Anthony Brown
- Bob Brown
- Chase Brown
- Chykie Brown
- Eddie Brown
- Josh Brown
- Ken Brown
- Orlando Brown
- Preston Brown
- Tom Brown
- Tony Brown
- Trent Brown
- Jim Browner
- Ross Browner
- Jake Browning
- Scott Brumfield
- Tim Buchanan
- Jason Buck
- Brentson Buckner
- Drew Buie
- Glenn Bujnoch
- Randy Bullock
- Frank Buncom
- Vontaze Burfict
- Scott Burk
- Rex Burkhead
- Oren Burks
- Gary Burley
- Jason Burns
- Jeff Burris
- Joe Burrow
- Jermaine Burton
- Blair Bush
- Steve Bush
- John Busing
- Barney Bussey
- Josh Bynes

== C ==
- Dave Cadigan
- Andre Caldwell
- Shaq Calhoun
- Austin Calitro
- Glenn Cameron
- Jason Campbell
- Justin Canale
- Alex Cappa
- Richard Carey
- Jackson Carman
- Ron Carpenter (born 1948)
- Ron Carpenter (born 1970)
- Wesley Carroll
- Tra Carson
- Barrett Carter
- Carl Carter
- Cethan Carter
- Chris Carter (born 1974)
- Chris Carter (born 1989)
- Ki-Jana Carter
- Tom Carter
- Virgil Carter
- Zachary Carter
- Tommy Casanova
- Simeon Castille
- Toney Catchings
- Frank Chamberlin
- Al Chandler
- Clarence Chapman
- Orson Charles
- Ja'Marr Chase
- Antonio Chatman
- Randy Chevrier
- Steve Chomyszak
- Drue Chrisman
- Jeff Christensen
- Bernard Clark
- Boobie Clark
- Bryan Clark
- Rico Clark
- Wayne Clark
- Will Clarke
- Nate Clements
- Duane Clemons
- Daniel Coats
- Marvin Cobb
- Mike Cobb
- Colin Cochart
- Devin Cochran
- Chase Coffman
- Al Coleman
- Laveranues Coles
- Andre Collins
- Anthony Collins
- Gerald Collins
- Glen Collins
- La'el Collins
- Cris Collinsworth
- Steve Conley
- John Conner
- Greg Cook
- Kyle Cook
- Pharoh Cooper
- John Copeland
- James Corbett
- Cody Core
- Frank Cornish Jr.
- Quan Cosby
- Bruce Coslet
- Brad Costello
- Jeff Cothran
- Barney Cotton
- Brad Cousino
- Christian Covington
- Scott Covington
- Eric Crabtree
- Neal Craig
- Chris Crocker
- Howard Cross III
- Andrew Crummey
- Keith Cupp
- Canute Curtis
- Isaac Curtis

== D ==
- Andy Dalton
- Mike Daniels
- Karlos Dansby
- Kenny Davidson
- Charlie Davis
- Dominique Davis
- Jalen Davis
- Lee Davis
- Oliver Davis
- Ricky Davis
- Sean Davis
- Tony Davis
- Akeem Davis-Gaither
- Clifton Dawson
- Paul Dawson
- Kiki DeAyala
- Allen DeGraffenreid
- Tom DeLeone
- Brian DeMarco
- Darqueze Dennard
- Guy Dennis
- Mark Dennis
- Tom DePaso
- Chris Devlin
- Ellis Dillahunt
- Corey Dillon
- Jayson DiManche
- Mike Dingle
- Tom Dinkel
- Gerald Dixon
- Rickey Dixon
- Mark Donahue
- Travis Dorsch
- DeDe Dorsey
- Mike Doss
- David Douglas
- Ty Douthard
- Doug Dressler
- Jeff Driskel
- Forey Duckett
- Ron Dugans
- Carlos Dunlap
- David Dunn
- Paul Dunn
- Sandy Durko
- Tony Dye
- Ken Dyer

== E ==
- James Eaddy
- Kasim Edebali
- Chris Edmonds
- Eddie Edwards
- Tyler Eifert
- Lenvil Elliott
- Larry Ely
- Paul Elzey
- Alex Erickson
- Bernie Erickson
- Mike Ernst
- Boomer Esiason
- Chris Evans
- Jordan Evans

== F ==
- Richard Fain
- Jeff Faine
- Dylan Fairchild
- Greg Fairchild
- Jonathan Fanene
- Noah Fant
- John Farley
- Danny Farmer
- Willie Fears
- Clayton Fejedelem
- Derrick Fenner
- Howard Fest
- Ryan Finley
- B. J. Finney
- Charles Fisher
- Jake Fisher
- Ryan Fitzpatrick
- Joe Flacco
- Tom Flaherty
- Jamar Fletcher
- John Fletcher
- Marquis Flowers
- Tre Flowers
- Steve Foley
- Jerry Fontenot
- Cody Ford
- J. P. Foschi
- Isaiah Foskey
- James Francis
- Pat Franklin
- Jordan Franks
- Andre Frazier
- Curt Frazier
- Guy Frazier
- Gus Frerotte
- Mike Frier
- David Frisch
- Stan Fritts
- Elliott Fry
- David Fulcher
- Scott Fulhage
- Mike Fuller

== G ==
- Jim Gallery
- John Garrett
- Shane Garrett
- Doug Gaynor
- Robert Geathers
- Jack Gehrke
- Allan George
- Tim George
- Mike Gesicki
- Brandon Ghee
- Eric Ghiaciuc
- Andy Gibler
- Damon Gibson
- Oliver Gibson
- Wallace Gilberry
- Joe Giles-Harris
- Cory Gilliard
- Ryan Glasgow
- William Glass
- Cordy Glenn
- LaVar Glover
- Mike Goff
- Alex Gordon
- Bruce Gradkowski
- Kenny Graham
- Scottie Graham
- Shayne Graham
- Cam Grandy
- Alan Grant
- David Grant
- Billy Granville
- White Graves
- A. J. Green
- Dave Green
- Harold Green
- Skyler Green
- BenJarvus Green-Ellis
- Jermaine Gresham
- Archie Griffin
- Damon Griffin
- James Griffin
- Jim Griffin
- Ray Griffin
- Clif Groce
- John Guillory
- Lance Gunn
- Harry Gunner
- Jeffrey Gunter
- Brock Gutierrez
- Lawrence Guy

== H ==
- Wayne Haddix
- Mike Haffner
- Cory Hall
- Leon Hall
- Cobi Hamilton
- Lawrence Hamilton
- Mike Hammerstein
- Jim Hannula
- Adrian Hardy
- Kevin Hardy
- Vernon Hargreaves
- Jimmy Hargrove
- Ed Harmon
- Devin Harper
- Chris Harrington
- Bo Harris
- Clark Harris
- Davontae Harris
- Jimmy Harris
- M. L. Harris
- Nick Harris
- Orien Harris
- James Harrison
- Bobby Hart
- A. J. Hawk
- Andrew Hawkins
- Artrell Hawkins
- Tanner Hawkinson
- Nick Hayden
- Jeff Hayes
- Sherrill Headrick
- Garrison Hearst
- Jo Jo Heath
- Rodney Heath
- Kyries Hebert
- Eric Henderson
- Trayvon Henderson
- Trey Hendrickson
- Chris Henry
- K.J. Henry
- Champ Henson
- Khalil Herbert
- Ken Herock
- Kim Herring
- Dan Herron
- Rob Hertel
- Ryan Hewitt
- Shaka Heyward
- Mike Hibler
- Bryan Hicks
- Tee Higgins
- B.J. Hill
- Brian Hill
- Darius Hill
- Daxton Hill
- Jeff Hill
- Jeremy Hill
- Trey Hill
- Troy Hill
- Ira Hillary
- Mike Hilton
- George Hinkle
- Victor Hobson
- Abdul Hodge
- Darius Hodge
- Steve Holden
- John Holifield
- Vernon Holland
- Donald Hollas
- Rodney Holman
- Glenn Holt
- Trey Hopkins
- Rod Horn
- Greg Horne
- Ray Horton
- T. J. Houshmandzadeh
- Thomas Howard
- Ty Howard
- Garry Howe
- Sam Hubbard
- Kevin Huber
- Tanner Hudson
- James Hundon
- Bobby Hunt
- Gary Hunt
- Margus Hunt
- Ron Hunt
- Hayden Hurst

== I ==
- George Iloka
- Tim Inglis
- Andrei Iosivas
- Trenton Irwin
- D. J. Ivey

== J ==
- Bernard Jackson
- Dexter Jackson
- John Jackson
- McKinnley Jackson
- Robert Jackson
- Shedrick Jackson
- William Jackson III
- Willie Jackson
- Lynn James
- Tory James
- Dick Jauron
- Rashad Jeanty
- Jordan Jefferson
- Kevin Jefferson
- Malik Jefferson
- Curtis Jeffries
- Kris Jenkins
- Mike Jenkins
- Kelly Jennings
- Ligarius Jennings
- Stanford Jennings
- John Jerry
- Paul Jetton
- Bill Johnson
- Bob Johnson
- Brandon Johnson (linebacker)
- Cedric Johnson
- Chad Johnson
- Donnell Johnson
- Essex Johnson
- Fred Johnson
- James Johnson
- Jeremi Johnson
- Jim Johnson
- John Johnson (born 1968)
- Josh Johnson (born 1986)
- Ken Johnson
- Landon Johnson
- Larry Johnson
- Lee Johnson
- Mark Johnson
- Michael Johnson
- Nico Johnson
- Pete Johnson
- Riall Johnson
- Rudi Johnson
- T. J. Johnson
- Tank Johnson
- Tim Johnson
- Walter Johnson
- Clay Johnston
- Charlie Joiner
- Evan Jolitz
- Adam Jones
- Bob Jones
- Charlie Jones
- Dan Jones
- David Jones
- Dhani Jones
- Herana-Daze Jones
- Keandre Jones
- Levi Jones
- Marvin Jones
- Rod Jones (born March 31, 1964)
- Rod Jones (born 1974)
- Roger Jones
- Scott Jones
- Sidney Jones
- Willie Jones
- Michael Jordan
- James Joseph
- Johnathan Joseph
- P. J. Jules
- Paul Justin

== K ==
- Kevin Kaesviharn
- Todd Kalis
- Khalid Kareem
- Ted Karras
- Eric Kattus
- Tim Kearney
- Curtis Keaton
- Rex Keeling
- Ernie Kellermann
- Bob Kelly
- Joe Kelly
- Mike Kelly
- Reggie Kelly
- Todd Kelly
- Bobby Kemp
- Don Kern
- Zach Kerr
- Ethan Kilmer
- Bill Kindricks
- Charlie King
- Emanuel King
- Joe King
- Larry Kinnebrew
- Randy Kirk
- Jaxson Kirkland
- Dre Kirkpatrick
- Jon Kitna
- David Klingler
- Demetrius Knight
- Pete Koch
- Vic Koegel
- Marshall Koehn
- Bill Kollar
- Scott Kooistra
- R.J. Kors
- Bruce Kozerski
- Steve Kreider
- Eric Kresser
- Al Krevis
- Tyler Kroft
- Tim Krumrie
- Howard Kurnick

== L ==
- Brandon LaFell
- Ron Lamb
- Emmanuel Lamur
- Jevon Langford
- Dave Lapham
- Kyle Larson
- Kwamie Lassiter II
- Dennis Law
- Nate Lawrie
- Carl Lawson
- Manny Lawson
- Steve Lawson
- Jim LeClair
- Donald Lee
- Matt Lee
- Jay Leeuwenburg
- Matt Lengel
- Brian Leonard
- Dwayne Levels
- Mike Levenseller
- Dave Lewis
- Chris Lewis-Harris
- Victor Leyva
- Chris Lindstrom
- Jack Linn
- Greg Little
- Nate Livings
- Dale Livingston
- James Logan
- Marc Logan
- Anthone Lott
- Nick Luchey
- Jonathan Luigs
- Vaughn Lusby
- Bralyn Lux
- Corey Lynch
- James Lynch

== M ==
- Greg Mabin
- Tremain Mack
- Bob Maddox
- Steve Maidlow
- Josh Mallard
- Josh Malone
- Massimo Manca
- Aaron Manning
- Roy Manning
- Sam Manos
- Marquand Manuel
- Curtis Marsh, Jr.
- Ed Marshall
- Lemar Marshall
- Mike Martin
- Terrance Martin
- Ric Mathias
- Evan Mathis
- John Matlock
- Pat Matson
- Rey Maualuga
- Reagan Maui'a
- Curtis Maxey
- Jim Maxwell
- Marcus Maxwell
- Rufus Mayes
- Corey Mays
- Taylor Mays
- Onterio McCalebb
- Ed McCall
- A. J. McCarron
- Skip McClendon
- Nick McCloud
- Wayne McClure
- David McCluskey
- John McDaniel
- Clinton McDonald
- Ricardo McDonald
- Tim McGee
- Tony McGee
- Kanavis McGhee
- Karmeeleyah McGill
- Mike McGlynn
- Pat McInally
- Kahlil McKenzie
- Tanner McLachlan
- Kirk McMullen
- Reggie McNeal
- Evan McPherson
- Tony McRae
- Torry McTyer
- Warren McVea
- Greg Meehan
- Marc Megna
- Jon Melander
- Andrew Melontree
- Zoltán Meskó
- Dave Middendorf
- Jeromy Miles
- Ostell Miles
- Caleb Miller
- John Miller
- Brian Milne
- Kendall Milton
- Amarius Mims
- Kevin Minter
- Anthony Mitchell
- Mack Mitchell
- Scott Mitchell
- Alonzo Mitz
- Joe Mixon
- Dontay Moch
- Mario Monds
- Cleo Montgomery
- Max Montoya
- Blake Moore
- Eric Moore
- Kelvin Moore
- Langston Moore
- Larry Moore
- Maulty Moore
- Tim Morabito
- Melvin Morgan
- Stanley Morgan Jr.
- Reece Morrison
- Zack Moss
- Ken Moyer
- Roddrick Muckelroy
- Horst Muhlmann
- Anthony Muñoz
- Myles Murphy
- Rico Murray
- Chip Myers
- Greg Myers
- Michael Myers
- Reggie Myles

== N ==
- Hannibal Navies
- Nedu Ndukwe
- Lorenzo Neal
- Randy Neal
- John Neidert
- Reggie Nelson
- Tom Nelson
- Marshall Newhouse
- Terence Newman
- Josh Newton
- A. J. Nicholson
- Hardy Nickerson Jr.
- Robert Niehoff
- Roosevelt Nix
- Maema Njongmeta
- Mike Norseth
- Jack Novak
- Mike Nugent

== O ==
- Brad Oates
- Mike Obrovac
- Antwan Odom
- Neil O'Donnell
- Matt O'Dwyer
- Eric Ogbogu
- Cedric Ogbuehi
- Alfred Oglesby
- Craig Ogletree
- Larry Ogunjobi
- Ifeanyi Ohalete
- Louis Oliver
- Deltha O'Neal
- Bo Orlando
- Joseph Ossai
- J. T. O'Sullivan
- Tyler Ott
- Terrell Owens

== P ==
- Carson Palmer
- Jordan Palmer
- Ernie Park
- Carl Parker
- Sirr Parker
- Lemar Parrish
- Ty Parten
- Lucas Patrick
- Elton Patterson
- Tito Paul
- Rod Payne
- Elvis Peacock
- Cedric Peerman
- Domata Peko
- Doug Pelfrey
- Mike Pennel
- Samaje Perine
- Kent Perkins
- Pete Perreault
- Chris Perry
- Jason Perry
- Scott Perry
- Tab Perry
- Frank Peters
- Ben Peterson
- Bill Peterson
- Aaron Pettrey
- Todd Philcox
- Darius Phillips
- Jess Phillips
- Ray Phillips
- Carl Pickens
- Clay Pickering
- Brian Pillman
- Marquis Pleasant
- Billy Poe
- David Pollack
- Mike Pollak
- Trent Pollard
- Nathan Poole
- Daniel Pope
- Geoff Pope
- Sean Porter
- Carl Powell
- Shawn Powell
- Germaine Pratt
- Chris Pressley
- Billy Price
- Mitchell Price
- Isaiah Prince
- Ron Pritchard
- Kendric Pryor
- Dave Pureifory
- Maurice Purify
- Andre Purvis

== Q ==
- Jeff Query

== R ==
- Neil Rackers
- Dennis Randall
- Al Randolph
- Thomas Randolph
- Sheldon Rankins
- Keiwan Ratliff
- Thomas Rawls
- Wyatt Ray
- Thomas Rayam
- Dave Rayner
- Rick Razzano
- D. J. Reader
- Gary Reasons
- John Reaves
- Alex Redmond
- Scott Rehberg
- Ryan Rehkow
- Mike Reid
- Riley Reiff
- Bruce Reimers
- Jeff Reinke
- Reggie Rembert
- Vincent Rey
- LaRoy Reynolds
- Andy Rice
- Dan Rice
- Kyle Richardson
- Tom Richey
- Elston Ridgle
- Jim Riggs
- Bob Riley
- Ken Riley
- Dave Rimington
- Christian Ringo
- Dalton Risner
- Jalen Rivers
- Keith Rivers
- Trevor Roach
- Brad Robbins
- Terrell Roberts
- Bryan Robinson
- Frank Robinson
- Patrick Robinson
- Paul Robinson
- Trevor Robinson
- Lamar Rogers
- Dennis Roland
- Mark Roman
- Nick Roman
- Dave Romasko
- Rich Romer
- Adrian Ross
- Dan Ross
- John Ross
- Jim Rourke
- Frostee Rucker
- Keith Rucker
- Cliff Russell
- KeiVarae Russell
- Wade Russell
- Tom Ruud
- Brett Rypien

== S ==
- Rod Saddler
- Troy Sadowski
- Saint Saffold
- Cameron Sample
- Drew Sample
- Robert Sands
- Dan Santucci
- Mohamed Sanu
- Dane Sanzenbacher
- Kevin Sargent
- Tony Savage
- Corey Sawyer
- Ken Sawyer
- J. K. Schaffer
- Max Scharping
- Anthony Schlegel
- Matt Schobel
- Turk Schonert
- Mason Schreck
- Jay Schroeder
- Jeff Schuh
- Scott Schutt
- Bernard Scott
- Bill Scott
- Darnay Scott
- Greg Scott
- Nick Scott
- Niles Scott
- Tom Scott
- Kirk Scrafford
- Austin Seibert
- Lance Sellers
- Sam Shade
- Eric Shaw
- Josh Shaw
- Scott Shaw
- Sedrick Shaw
- Willie Shelby
- Brady Sheldon
- Chris Shelling
- Tyler Shelvin
- Rod Sherman
- John Shinners
- Jordan Shipley
- Jason Shirley
- Ron Shumon
- Brian Simmons
- Clyde Simmons
- John Simmons
- Marcello Simmons
- Ron Simpkins
- Jerome Simpson
- LeShaun Sims
- Pat Sims
- Reggie Sims
- Jim Skow
- Dan Skuta
- Tedarrell Slaton
- Tom Smiley
- Akili Smith
- Alex Smith
- Andre Smith
- Artie Smith
- Brad Smith
- Chris Smith
- D'Ante Smith
- Daryl Smith
- Dave Smith
- Derron Smith
- Fletcher Smith
- Gary Smith
- Irv Smith Jr.
- Jeff Smith
- Justin Smith
- Ken Smith
- Kendal Smith
- Ron Smith
- Shaun Smith
- Tommie Smith
- Quinton Spain
- Armegis Spearman
- Noah Spence
- Jimmy Spencer
- Takeo Spikes
- Philip Spiller
- Jimmy Sprotte
- Damion Square
- Mike St. Clair
- Brad St. Louis
- Bill Staley
- Ramondo Stallings
- Glen Steele
- Milt Stegall
- Eric Steinbach
- Alex Stepanovich
- Jamain Stephens
- Santo Stephens
- Larry Stevens
- Shemar Stewart
- Tony Stewart
- Devon Still
- Clint Stitser
- John Stofa
- Geno Stone
- Danny Stubbs
- Andrew Stueber
- Xavier Su'a-Filo
- Shafer Suggs
- Alex Sulfsted
- Ian Sunter
- Keaton Sutherland
- Terry Swanson
- Thatcher Szalay

== T ==
- Ralph Tamm
- Auden Tate
- Brandon Tate
- Rodney Tate
- Craig Taylor
- Trent Taylor
- Cam Taylor-Britt
- Tim Terry
- Eric Thomas
- Lee Thomas
- Michael Thomas
- Mike Thomas
- Sean Thomas
- Speedy Thomas
- Jeff Thomason
- Brandon Thompson
- Craig Thompson
- Jack Thompson
- Lamont Thompson
- Mike Thompson
- John Thornton
- Reggie Thornton
- Odell Thurman
- Mark Tigges
- Mitchell Tinsley
- Steve Tovar
- Brian Townsend
- Morgan Trent
- Greg Truitt
- Bob Trumpy
- Natu Tuatagaloa
- Jay Tufele
- Tom Tumulty
- Josh Tupou
- Clem Turner
- Deacon Turner
- D. J. Turner
- Jimmy Turner
- Melvin Tuten
- Rodney Tweet
- Gunnard Twyner

== U ==
- Ben Utecht
- C. J. Uzomah

== V ==
- David Verser
- Nick Vigil
- Ted Vincent
- Fernandus Vinson
- Sandro Vitiello
- Cordell Volson
- Kimo von Oelhoffen

== W ==
- Jonathan Wade
- Ray Wagner
- William Wagner
- Bracy Walker
- Kevin Walker
- Rick Walker
- Brett Wallerstedt
- Dave Walter
- Joe Walter
- Kevin Walter
- Stan Walters
- Mark Walton
- David Ward
- Derek Ware
- Dewey Warren
- Peter Warrick
- Adolphus Washington
- Kelley Washington
- Sam Washington
- Teddy Washington
- Kenny Watson
- Pete Watson
- Trae Waynes
- Dennis Weathersby
- Emanuel Weaver
- B. W. Webb
- Richmond Webb
- Nate Webster
- Dana Wells
- Mike Wells
- Michael Westbrook
- Christian Westerman
- Ryan Whalen
- Leonard Wheeler
- Andre White
- Leon White
- Marvin White
- Mike White
- Sheldon White
- Sherman White
- Wilson Whitley
- Bobby Whitten
- Bernard Whittington
- Andrew Whitworth
- Solomon Wilcots
- Mitchell Wilcox
- Erik Wilhelm
- Ben Wilkerson
- Marcus Wilkins
- Dan Wilkinson
- Alfred Williams
- Bobbie Williams
- Darryl Williams
- DeShawn Williams
- Ed Williams
- Gary Williams
- Isaiah Williams
- Jarveon Williams
- Jonah Williams
- Ke'Shawn Williams
- Madieu Williams
- Monk Williams
- Pooka Williams
- Reggie Williams
- Roy Williams
- Shawn Williams
- Stepfret Williams
- Tony Williams
- Trayveon Williams
- Xavier Williams
- Damion Willis
- Fred Willis
- Jordan Willis
- Brandon Wilson
- Gibril Wilson
- Joe Wilson
- Logan Wilson
- Marco Wilson
- Mike Wilson (born 1947)
- Mike Wilson (born 1955)
- Quincy Wilson
- Reinard Wilson
- Stanley Wilson
- Tydus Winans
- Eric Winston
- Mike Withycombe
- Ickey Woods
- Chris Worley
- Renell Wren
- Anthony Wright
- Dana Wright
- Ernie Wright
- James Wright
- Lawrence Wright
- Sam Wyche
- Kerry Wynn

== Y ==
- Craig Yeast
- Cade York

== Z ==
- Carl Zander
- Kevin Zeitler
- Anthony Zettel
