= 1987 Cincinnati Bengals season =

NFL team season

- General manager: Paul Brown
- Head coach: Sam Wyche
- Home stadium: Riverfront Stadium

Results
- Record: 4–11
- Division place: 4th AFC Central
- Playoffs: Did not qualify

The 1987 Cincinnati Bengals season was the team's 18th in the National Football League (NFL). The team could not improve upon its 10–6 year of the previous campaign, as the team dipped to a record of 4–11 in a season shortened by one game due to another players' strike, in which replacement players were used for three games.

This was the first season since 1970 that Ken Anderson was not on the opening day roster.

== Offseason ==
=== NFL draft ===
1987 Cincinnati Bengals draft
Round	Pick	Player	Position	College	Notes
1	17	Jason Buck	Defensive end	BYU	
2	49	Eric Thomas *	Defensive back	Tulane	
3	76	Leonard Bell	Defensive back	Indiana	
3	77	Skip McClendon	Defensive end	Arizona State	
4	103	Jim Riggs	Tight end	Clemson	
5	130	Marc Logan	Running back	Kentucky	
5	139	Greg Horne	Punter	Arkansas	
6	157	Sonny Gordon	Defensive back	Ohio State	
7	188	Chris Thatcher	Guard	Lafayette	
8	215	Solomon Wilcots	Defensive back	Colorado	
9	242	Craig Raddatz	Linebacker	Wisconsin	
10	269	David McCluskey	Running back	Georgia	
11	296	Jim Warne	Offensive tackle	Arizona State	
12	328	John Holifield	Running back	West Virginia	
Made roster * Made at least one Pro Bowl during career

== Personnel ==
=== Staff ===
1987 Cincinnati Bengals staff
Front office: President – John Sawyer; General Manager – Paul Brown; Assistant General Manager – Mike Brown; Director of Player Personnel – Pete Brown; Head coaches: Head Coach – Sam Wyche; Offensive coaches: Offensive Coordinator – Bruce Coslet; Running Backs – Jim Anderson; Tight Ends – Bill Johnson; Offensive Line – Jim McNally	Defensive coaches: Defensive Coordinator/Defensive Backs – Dick LeBeau; Defensive Line – Bill Urbanik; Linebackers – Dick Selcer; Special teams coaches: Special Teams – Mike Stock; Strength and conditioning: Strength – Kim Wood

=== Roster ===
1987 Cincinnati Bengals roster
Quarterbacks (QB): 7 Boomer Esiason; 12 Mike Norseth; 15 Turk Schonert; Running backs (RB): 21 James Brooks; 36 Stanford Jennings; 30 Bill Johnson; 28 Larry Kinnebrew; 49 Dana Wright; Wide receivers (WR): 81 Eddie Brown; 80 Cris Collinsworth; 89 Ira Hillary; 88 Mike Martin; 85 Tim McGee; Tight ends (TE): 82 Rodney Holman; 84 Eric Kattus; 87 Jim Riggs	Offensive linemen (OL): 61 Doug Aronson G; 74 Brian Blados G; 67 David Douglas C; 64 Bruce Kozerski G; 65 Max Montoya G; 78 Anthony Muñoz T; 75 Bruce Reimers G; 50 Dave Rimington C; 63 Joe Walter T; Defensive linemen (DL): 99 Jason Buck DE; 73 Eddie Edwards DE; 71 Mike Hammerstein NT; 69 Tim Krumrie NT; 72 Skip McClendon DE; 70 Jim Skow DE	Linebackers (LB): 53 Leo Barker ILB; 55 Ed Brady ILB; 93 Kiki DeAyala ILB; 92 Tim Inglis ILB; 58 Joe Kelly ILB; 90 Emanuel King OLB; 51 Leon White OLB; 57 Reggie Williams OLB; 91 Carl Zander ILB; Defensive backs (DB): 26 Leonard Bell FS; 24 Lewis Billups CB; 34 Louis Breeden CB; 27 Barney Bussey SS; 20 Ray Horton CB; 37 Robert Jackson FS; 22 Eric Thomas CB; 41 Solomon Wilcots CB; Special teams (ST): 3 Jim Breech K; 17 Scott Fulhage P	Reserve: 33 David Fulcher SS (IR); —- Jeff Reinke DE (IR); -- Lance Sellers LB (IR); 32 Stanley Wilson RB (Susp.); Rookies in italics

=== NFL replacement players ===
After the league decided to use replacement players during the NFLPA strike, the following team was assembled:

1987 Cincinnati Bengals replacement roster
Quarterbacks: 16 Ben Bennett; 18 Adrian Breen; 11 Dave Walter; Running backs: 39 Pat Franklin; 29 Marc Logan; 40 David McCluskey; 46 Dan Rice; 49 Dana Wright; Wide receivers: 86 Ken Brown; 80 Tom Brown; 85 Greg Meehan; 81 Marquis Pleasant; 42 Darryl Richardson; 84 Rodney Tweet; 23 Mike Wade; Tight ends: 83 Dave Romasko; 82 Wade Russell; 84 Reggie Sims	Offensive linemen: 72 Keith Cupp; 71 John Fletcher; 60 Sam Manos; 61 Bill Poe; 68 Tom Richey; 66 Bob Riley; 62 Ken Smith; 77 Mark Tigges; Defensive linemen: 79 Bill Berthusen; 95 Mike Devries; 73 Eddie Edwards; 96 Willie Fears; 67 Jeff Reinke; 76 Jeff Smith	Linebackers: 56 Toney Catchings; 52 Tom Flaherty; 92 Tim Inglis; 59 Scott Schutt; 84 Lance Sellers; 51 David Ward; 57 Reggie Williams; Defensive backs: 35 Chris Barber; 32 Nate Borders; 38 Mark Guerra; 31 Gary Hunt; 43 Mark Johnson; 44 Aaron Manning; 42 Robert Niehoff; 25 Daryl Smith; Special teams: 17 Scott Fulhage P; 9 Massimo Manca K

== Regular season ==
=== Schedule ===
Week	Date	Opponent	Result	Record	Venue	Attendance
1	September 13	at Indianapolis Colts	**W** 23–21	1–0	Hoosier Dome	59,387
2	September 20	San Francisco 49ers	**L** 26–27	1–1	Riverfront Stadium	53,498
–	September 27	at Los Angeles Rams	canceled	1–1	Anaheim Stadium	
3	October 4	San Diego Chargers	**L** 9–10	1–2	Riverfront Stadium	26,209
4	October 11	at Seattle Seahawks	**W** 17–10	2–2	Kingdome	31,739
5	October 18	**Cleveland Browns**	**L** 0–34	2–3	Riverfront Stadium	40,179
6	October 25	at **Pittsburgh Steelers**	**L** 20–23	2–4	Three Rivers Stadium	53,692
7	November 1	**Houston Oilers**	**L** 29–31	2–5	Riverfront Stadium	52,700
8	November 8	Miami Dolphins	**L** 14–20	2–6	Riverfront Stadium	53,840
9	November 15	at Atlanta Falcons	**W** 16–10	3–6	Atlanta–Fulton County Stadium	25,758
10	November 22	**Pittsburgh Steelers**	**L** 16–30	3–7	Riverfront Stadium	59,910
11	November 29	at New York Jets	**L** 20–27	3–8	Giants Stadium	41,135
12	December 6	Kansas City Chiefs	**W** 30–27	4–8	Riverfront Stadium	46,489
13	December 13	at **Cleveland Browns**	**L** 24–38	4–9	Cleveland Municipal Stadium	77,331
14	December 20	New Orleans Saints	**L** 24–41	4–10	Riverfront Stadium	43,424
15	December 27	at **Houston Oilers**	**L** 17–21	4–11	Houston Astrodome	49,775
Note: Intra-division opponents are in **bold** text.

=== Standings ===
AFC Central
	W	L	T	PCT	DIV	CONF	PF	PA	STK
^{(2)} Cleveland Browns	10	5	0	.667	5–1	8–3	390	239	W3
^{(4)} Houston Oilers	9	6	0	.600	5–1	7–4	345	349	W2
Pittsburgh Steelers	8	7	0	.533	2–4	6–5	285	299	L2
Cincinnati Bengals	4	11	0	.267	0–6	3–9	285	370	L3

== Team leaders ==
=== Passing ===
Player	Att	Comp	Yds	TD	INT	Rating
Boomer Esiason	440	240	3321	16	19	73.1

=== Rushing ===
Player	Att	Yds	YPC	Long	TD
Larry Kinnebrew	145	570	3.9	52	8

=== Receiving ===
Player	Rec	Yds	Avg	Long	TD
Eddie Brown	44	608	13.8	47	3
Mike Martin	20	394	19.7	54	3

=== Defensive ===
Player	Tackles	Sacks	INTs	FF	FR
Tim Krumrie	88	3.5	0	0	0
Reggie Williams	75	6.0	0	1	2
Robert Jackson	70	0	3	0	1
David Fulcher	72	3	3	1	1

=== Kicking and punting ===
Player	FGA	FGM	FG%	XPA	XPM	XP%	Points
Jim Breech	30	24	80.0%	27	25	92.6	97

Player	Punts	Yards	Long	Blkd	Avg.
Scott Fulhage	52	2168	58	0	41.7

=== Special teams ===
Player	KR	KRYards	KRAvg	KRLong	KRTD	PR	PRYards	PRAvg	PRLong	PRTD
Barney Bussey	21	406	19.3	34	0	0	0	0.0	0	0
Mike Martin	3	51	17.0	20	0	28	277	9.9	21	0

== Awards and records ==
- Anthony Muñoz, AFC Pro Bowl Selection
- Tim Krumrie, AFC Pro Bowl Selection
