= 1986 Cincinnati Bengals season =

NFL team season

- Head coach: Sam Wyche
- Home stadium: Riverfront Stadium

Results
- Record: 10–6
- Division place: 2nd AFC Central
- Playoffs: Did not qualify

The 1986 season was the Cincinnati Bengals' 17th season in the National Football League (NFL), their 19th overall, and their third under head coach Sam Wyche. The Bengals were one of two teams with ten wins that failed to make the AFC playoffs in 1986.

Third-year quarterback Boomer Esiason, who had the best season of his career, passed for a team-record 3,959 yards, 24 touchdowns and 17 interceptions with a completion percentage of 58.2 and a passer rating of 87.7, while halfback James Brooks rushed for 1,087 yards as the Bengals went 10–6, narrowly missing a playoff berth. Linebacker Reggie Williams was selected NFL Man of the Year for his efforts to charity and the community. The Bengals amassed a club-record 621 yards net offense in a 52–21 victory over the New York Jets on December 21. No NFL team has since matched that total in a regulation-time game since.

== Offseason ==
=== NFL draft ===
1986 Cincinnati Bengals draft
Round	Pick	Player	Position	College	Notes
1	11	Joe Kelly	Linebacker	Washington	
1	21	Tim McGee	Wide receiver	Tennessee	
2	38	Lewis Billups	Defensive back	North Alabama	
3	58	Jim Skow	Defensive end	Nebraska	
3	65	Mike Hammerstein	Defensive tackle	Michigan	
3	78	David Fulcher *	Defensive back	Arizona State	
4	91	Eric Kattus	Tight end	Michigan	
4	99	Doug Gaynor	Quarterback	Long Beach State	
5	123	Leon White	Linebacker	BYU	
6	152	Gary Hunt	Defensive back	Memphis	
7	177	Pat Franklin	Running back	Texas State	
8	204	David Douglas	Guard	Tennessee	
9	230	Cary Whittingham	Linebacker	BYU	
10	262	Jeff Shaw	Defensive tackle	Salem (WV)	
11	289	Tim Stone	Offensive tackle	Kansas State	
11	294	Tom Flaherty	Linebacker	Northwestern	
12	316	Steve Bradley	Quarterback	Indiana	
Made roster * Made at least one Pro Bowl during career

== Roster ==
1986 Cincinnati Bengals roster
Quarterbacks (QB): 14 Ken Anderson; 7 Boomer Esiason; Running backs (RB): 21 James Brooks; 36 Stanford Jennings; 30 Bill Johnson; 28 Larry Kinnebrew; 32 Stanley Wilson; Wide receivers (WR): 81 Eddie Brown; 80 Cris Collinsworth; 86 Steve Kreider; 88 Mike Martin; 85 Tim McGee; Tight ends (TE): 82 Rodney Holman; 84 Eric Kattus	Offensive linemen (OL): 74 Brian Blados T; 67 David Douglas G; 64 Bruce Kozerski G/C; 65 Max Montoya G; 78 Anthony Muñoz T; 75 Bruce Reimers G; 50 Dave Rimington C; 63 Joe Walter T; Defensive linemen (DL): 79 Ross Browner DE; 73 Eddie Edwards DE; 71 Mike Hammerstein NT; 69 Tim Krumrie NT; 70 Jim Skow DE	Linebackers (LB): 53 Leo Barker ILB; 55 Ed Brady ILB; 93 Kiki DeAyala OLB; 58 Joe Kelly ILB; 90 Emanuel King OLB; 56 Ron Simpkins ILB; 51 Leon White OLB; 57 Reggie Williams OLB; 91 Carl Zander ILB; Defensive backs (DB): 24 Lewis Billups CB; 34 Louis Breeden CB; 27 Barney Bussey SS; 33 David Fulcher SS; 20 Ray Horton CB; 37 Robert Jackson FS; 26 Bobby Kemp FS; Special teams (ST): 3 Jim Breech K; 5 Jeff Hayes P	Reserve: 11 Doug Gaynor QB (IR); 95 Jim Herrmann DE (IR); 43 Ira Hillary WR (IR); 96 Jeff Shaw NT (IR); Rookies in italics

== Regular season ==
=== Schedule ===
Week	Date	Opponent	Result	Record	Venue	Attendance
1	September 7	at Kansas City Chiefs	**L** 14–24	0–1	Arrowhead Stadium	43,430
2	September 14	Buffalo Bills	**W** 36–33	1–1	Riverfront Stadium	52,714
3	September 18	at **Cleveland Browns**	**W** 30–13	2–1	Cleveland Municipal Stadium	78,779
4	September 28	Chicago Bears	**L** 7–44	2–2	Riverfront Stadium	55,146
5	October 5	at Green Bay Packers	**W** 34–28	3–2	Milwaukee County Stadium	51,230
6	October 13	**Pittsburgh Steelers**	**W** 24–22	4–2	Riverfront Stadium	54,283
7	October 19	**Houston Oilers**	**W** 31–28	5–2	Riverfront Stadium	53,844
8	October 26	at **Pittsburgh Steelers**	**L** 9–30	5–3	Three Rivers Stadium	50,815
9	November 2	at Detroit Lions	**W** 24–17	6–3	Pontiac Silverdome	52,423
10	November 9	at **Houston Oilers**	**L** 28–32	6–4	Astrodome	32,130
11	November 16	Seattle Seahawks	**W** 34–7	7–4	Riverfront Stadium	54,410
12	November 23	Minnesota Vikings	**W** 24–20	8–4	Riverfront Stadium	53,003
13	November 30	at Denver Broncos	**L** 28–34	8–5	Mile High Stadium	58,705
14	December 7	at New England Patriots	**W** 31–7	9–5	Sullivan Stadium	60,633
15	December 14	**Cleveland Browns**	**L** 3–34	9–6	Riverfront Stadium	58,062
16	December 21	New York Jets	**W** 52–21	10–6	Riverfront Stadium	51,619
Note: Intra-division opponents are in **bold** text.

=== Standings ===
AFC Central
	W	L	T	PCT	DIV	CONF	PF	PA	STK
^{(1)} Cleveland Browns	12	4	0	.750	5–1	10–2	391	310	W5
Cincinnati Bengals	10	6	0	.625	3–3	7–5	409	394	W1
Pittsburgh Steelers	6	10	0	.375	3–3	4–8	307	336	L1
Houston Oilers	5	11	0	.313	1–5	3–9	274	329	W2

== Team leaders ==
=== Passing ===
Player	Att	Comp	Yds	TD	INT	Rating
Boomer Esiason	469	273	3959	24	17	87.7

=== Rushing ===
Player	Att	Yds	YPC	Long	TD
James Brooks	205	1087	5.3	56	5
Larry Kinnebrew	131	519	4.0	39	8
Stanley Wilson	68	379	5.6	58	8

=== Receiving ===
Player	Rec	Yds	Avg	Long	TD
Cris Collinsworth	62	1024	16.5	46	10

=== Defensive ===
Player	Tackles	Sacks	INTs	FF	FR
Tim Krumrie	113	1.0	0	0	2
Louis Breeden	56	0.0	7	1	0
Emmanual King	70	9.0	0	2	1

=== Kicking and punting ===
Player	FGA	FGM	FG%	XPA	XPM	XP%	Points
Jim Breech	32	17	53.1%	51	50	98.0	101

Player	Punts	Yards	Long	Blkd	Avg.
Jeff Hayes	56	1965	52	2	35.1

=== Special teams ===
Player	KR	KRYards	KRAvg	KRLong	KRTD	PR	PRYards	PRAvg	PRLong	PRTD
Tim McGee	43	1007	23.4	94	0	3	21	7.0	9	0
Mike Martin	4	83	20.8	21	0	13	96	7.4	14	0

== Awards and records ==
- Boomer Esiason, franchise record (since broken), most passing yards in one game, 425 yards (vs. New York Jets, on December 21, 1986)
- Boomer Esiason, franchise record (since broken), most passing yards in one season, 3,959 yards
- Boomer Esiason, franchise record, most touchdown passes in one game, 5 passes (achieved on December 21, 1986)

=== Milestones ===
- James Brooks, 1000 yard rushing season (1,087)
- Cris Collinsworth, 1000 yard receiving season (1,024)
