= 1989 Cincinnati Bengals season =

1989 season of the Cincinnati Bengals

- General manager: Paul Brown
- Head coach: Sam Wyche
- Home stadium: Riverfront Stadium

Results
- Record: 8–8
- Division place: 4th AFC Central
- Playoffs: Did not qualify
- Pro Bowlers: 6: G Max Montoya; OT Anthony Muñoz; TE Rodney Holman; QB Boomer Esiason; RB James Brooks; SS David Fulcher

The 1989 Cincinnati Bengals season was their 20th in the National Football League (NFL) and 22nd overall. The Bengals' 404 points scored were the fourth-most in the NFL in 1989. Four of their eight losses on the season were by a touchdown or less.

The 1989 Bengals are the most recent NFL team to score 55 points or more twice in a single season: Week 8 against the Tampa Bay Buccaneers (56) and Week 15 against the arch-rival Houston Oilers (61), both at home. Despite this, the Bengals finished the season 4th in their division and failed to earn a playoff berth, making them the only team in the AFC Central to do so.

== Offseason ==
=== NFL draft ===
1989 Cincinnati Bengals draft
Round	Pick	Player	Position	College	Notes
2	35	Eric Ball	Running back	UCLA	
2	55	Freddie Childress	Offensive tackle	Arkansas	
3	83	Erik Wilhelm	Quarterback	Oregon State	
4	89	Kerry Owens	Linebacker	Arkansas	
4	111	Rob Woods	Offensive tackle	Arizona	
5	138	Natu Tuatagaloa	Defensive end	California	
6	166	Craig Taylor	Running back	West Virginia	
7	194	Kendal Smith	Wide receiver	Utah State	
8	222	Chris Chenault	Linebacker	Kentucky	
9	250	Rich Stephens	Guard	Tulsa	
10	256	Cornell Holloway	Defensive back	Pittsburgh	
10	278	Bob Jean	Quarterback	New Hampshire	
11	306	Dana Wells	Defensive tackle	Arizona	
12	334	Scott Jones	Offensive tackle	Washington	
Made roster

=== Undrafted free agents ===
1989 undrafted free agents of note
Player	Position	College
Rich Gicewicz	Tight End	Michigan State
Brett Grimshaw	Running Back	Western Illinois
Tom Gruno	Linebacker	Toledo
John Guerrero	Tackle	USC
Todd Philcox	Quarterback	Syracuse
Mark Rothwell	Wide receiver	Wisconsin–Stout

== Personnel ==
=== Staff ===
1989 Cincinnati Bengals staff
Front office: President – John Sawyer; General Manager – Paul Brown; Assistant General Manager – Mike Brown; Director of Player Personnel – Pete Brown; Head coaches: Head Coach – Sam Wyche; Offensive coaches: Offensive Coordinator – Bruce Coslet; Running Backs – Jim Anderson; Tight Ends – Bill Johnson; Offensive Line – Jim McNally	Defensive coaches: Defensive Coordinator/Defensive Backs – Dick LeBeau; Defensive Line – Chuck Studley; Linebackers – Dick Selcer; Special teams coaches: Special Teams – Mike Stock; Strength and conditioning: Strength – Kim Wood

=== Roster ===
1989 Cincinnati Bengals roster
Quarterbacks (QB): 7 Boomer Esiason; 12 Erik Wilhelm; Running backs (RB): 42 Eric Ball; 21 James Brooks; 40 John Holifield; 36 Stanford Jennings; 20 Craig Taylor; Wide receivers (WR): 81 Eddie Brown; 48 John Garrett; 89 Ira Hillary; 88 Mike Martin; 85 Tim McGee; 83 Kendal Smith; Tight ends (TE): 82 Rodney Holman; 84 Eric Kattus; 87 Jim Riggs	Offensive linemen (OL): 74 Brian Blados T; 77 Scott Jones T; 64 Bruce Kozerski C; 65 Max Montoya G; 73 Ken Moyer T; 78 Anthony Muñoz T; 75 Bruce Reimers G; 63 Joe Walter T; Defensive linemen (DL): 99 Jason Buck DE; 98 David Grant NT; 71 Mike Hammerstein DE; 69 Tim Krumrie NT; 72 Skip McClendon DE; 70 Jim Skow DE; 96 Natu Tuatagaloa DE	Linebackers (LB): 53 Leo Barker OLB; 58 Joe Kelly ILB; 59 Kevin Walker ILB; 51 Leon White OLB; 57 Reggie Williams OLB; 91 Carl Zander ILB; Defensive backs (DB): 24 Lewis Billups CB; 27 Barney Bussey SS; 34 Richard Carey CB; 29 Rickey Dixon FS; 33 David Fulcher SS; 22 Eric Thomas CB; 41 Solomon Wilcots CB; Special teams (ST): 55 Ed Brady LS; 3 Jim Breech K; 11 Lee Johnson P	Practice squad: 10 Todd Philcox QB; 79 Dana Wells NT; Reserve: 35 Chris Barber S (IR); 37 Robert Jackson S (IR); 68 Paul Jetton C (IR); 15 Turk Schonert QB (IR); 30 Ickey Woods FB (IR); 60 Rob Woods T (IR); 47 active, 6 inactive, 2 practice squad Rookies in italics

== Regular season ==
=== Schedule ===
Week	Date	Opponent	Result	Record	Venue	Recap
1	September 10	at Chicago Bears	**L** 14–17	0–1	Soldier Field	Recap
2	September 17	**Pittsburgh Steelers**	**W** 41–10	1–1	Riverfront Stadium	Recap
3	September 25	**Cleveland Browns**	**W** 21–14	2–1	Riverfront Stadium	Recap
4	October 1	at Kansas City Chiefs	**W** 21–17	3–1	Arrowhead Stadium	Recap
5	October 8	at **Pittsburgh Steelers**	**W** 26–16	4–1	Three Rivers Stadium	Recap
6	October 15	Miami Dolphins	**L** 13–20	4–2	Riverfront Stadium	Recap
7	October 22	Indianapolis Colts	**L** 12–23	4–3	Riverfront Stadium	Recap
8	October 29	Tampa Bay Buccaneers	**W** 56–23	5–3	Riverfront Stadium	Recap
9	November 5	at Los Angeles Raiders	**L** 7–28	5-4	Los Angeles Memorial Coliseum	Recap
10	November 13	at **Houston Oilers**	**L** 24–26	5–5	Astrodome	Recap
11	November 19	Detroit Lions	**W** 42–7	6–5	Riverfront Stadium	Recap
12	November 26	at Buffalo Bills	**L** 7–24	6–6	Rich Stadium	Recap
13	December 3	at **Cleveland Browns**	**W** 21–0	7–6	Cleveland Stadium	Recap
14	December 10	Seattle Seahawks	**L** 17–24	7–7	Riverfront Stadium	Recap
15	December 17	**Houston Oilers**	**W** 61–7	8–7	Riverfront Stadium	Recap
16	December 25	at Minnesota Vikings	**L** 21–29	8–8	Hubert H. Humphrey Metrodome	Recap
Note: Intra-division opponents are in **bold** text.

=== Season summary ===
==== Week 1 at Bears ====
Week One: Cincinnati Bengals (0–0) at Chicago Bears (0–0)

Quarter	1	2	3	4	Total
Bengals	7	0	7	0	**14**
**Bears**	0	7	3	7	**17**

at Soldier Field, Chicago, Illinois

- Date: September 10
- Game time: 1:00 p.m.
- Game weather: 64 °F (18 °C)
- Game attendance: 64,730
- Referee: Jerry Seeman
- TV announcers (NBC): Dick Enberg and Bill Walsh
- Box Score, Box Score

Game information

First quarter

- CIN – James Brooks 4-yard pass from Boomer Esiason (Jim Breech kick), 9:52. Bengals 7–0.

Second quarter

- CHI – Mike Tomczak 11-yard run (Kevin Butler kick), 0:10. Tie 7–7.

Third quarter

- CIN – Ickey Woods 5-yard run (Jim Breech kick), 8:28. Bengals 14–7.
- CHI – Kevin Butler 29-yard field goal, 11:40. Bengals 14–10.

Fourth quarter

- CHI – James Thornton 20-yard pass from Mike Tomczak (Kevin Butler kick), 10:06. Bears 17–14.

Top passers

- CIN – Boomer Esiason – 18/36, 184 yards, TD
- CHI – Mike Tomczak – 10/24, 159 yards, TD, 2 INT

Top rushers

- CIN – James Brooks – 13 rushes, 88 yards
- CHI – Neal Anderson – 21 rushes, 146 yards

Top receivers

- CIN – James Brooks – 5 receptions, 46 yards, TD
- CHI – James Thornton – 4 receptions, 86 yards, TD

==== Week 3 vs. Browns ====
Week Three: Cleveland Browns (2–0) at Cincinnati Bengals (1–1)

Quarter	1	2	3	4	Total
Browns	0	14	0	0	**14**
**Bengals**	0	14	7	0	**21**

at Riverfront Stadium, Cincinnati, Ohio

- Date: September 25
- Game time: 9:00 p.m. EDT
- Game weather: 53 °F (12 °C)
- TV announcers (ABC): Frank Gifford, Al Michaels, Dan Dierdorf
- Box Score

==== Week 14 vs. Seahawks ====
Week Fourteen: Seattle Seahawks at Cincinnati Bengals – Game summary

Quarter	1	2	3	4	Total
**Seahawks**	0	7	10	7	**24**
Bengals	7	3	0	7	**17**

at Riverfront Stadium • Cincinnati, Ohio

- Date: December 10
- Game time: 1:00pm local
- Game weather: Cloudy • 30 °F (−1 °C) • Wind 12 miles per hour (19 km/h) SW
- Game attendance: 54,744
- Referee: Bob McElwee
- TV: NBC
- Play-by-Play

Game information

Seahawks

- Dave Krieg
  22/33, 258 Yds, 3 TD, INT
- Curt Warner
  14 Rush, 51 Yds
- Brian Blades
  6 Rec, 107 Yds, TD

Bengals

- Boomer Esiason
  21/42, 246 yds, TD
- James Brooks
  11 Rush, 52 Yds
- Tim McGee
  7 Rec, 109 Yds, TD

You don't live in Cleveland, you live in Cincinnati.

— Sam Wyche, Bengals head coach

Scoring summary

Quarter	Time	Drive			Team	Scoring information	Score	
Quarter	Time	Plays	Yards	TOP	Team	Scoring information	SEA	CIN
1	5:18	3	44	0:48	Bengals	Tim McGee 21-yard touchdown reception from Boomer Esiason, Jim Breech kick good	0	7
2	10:37	13	71	5:51	Bengals	24-yard field goal by Jim Breech	0	10
2	0:42	12	78	2:25	Seahawks	Steve Largent 10-yard touchdown reception from Dave Krieg, Norm Johnson kick good	7	10
3	12:58	5	37	1:51	Seahawks	48-yard field goal by Norm Johnson	10	10
3	10:14	1	60	0:12	Seahawks	Brian Blades 60-yard touchdown reception from Dave Krieg, Norm Johnson kick good	17	10
4	9:39				Bengals	Interception returned 18 yards for touchdown by Eric Thomas, Jim Breech kick good	17	17
4	3:51	10	80	5:42	Seahawks	Curt Warner 1-yard touchdown reception from Dave Krieg, Norm Johnson kick good	24	17
"TOP" = time of possession. For other American football terms, see Glossary of American football.							24	17

=== Standings ===
AFC Central
	W	L	T	PCT	DIV	CONF	PF	PA	STK
^{(2)} Cleveland Browns	9	6	1	.594	3–3	6–5–1	334	254	W2
^{(4)} Houston Oilers	9	7	0	.563	3–3	6–6	365	412	L2
^{(5)} Pittsburgh Steelers	9	7	0	.563	1–5	6–6	265	326	W3
Cincinnati Bengals	8	8	0	.500	5–1	6–6	404	285	L1

== Team leaders ==
=== Passing ===
Player	Att	Comp	Yds	TD	INT	Rating
Boomer Esiason	455	258	3525	28	11	92.1

=== Rushing ===
Player	Att	Yds	YPC	Long	TD
James Brooks	221	1239	5.6	65	7

=== Receiving ===
Player	Rec	Yds	Avg	Long	TD
Tim McGee	65	1211	18.6	74	8
Rodney Holman	50	736	14.7	73	9

=== Defensive ===
Player	Tackles	Sacks	INTs	FF	FR
David Fulcher	107	0	8	1	4
Jason Buck	63	6	0	1	1

=== Kicking and punting ===
Player	FGA	FGM	FG%	XPA	XPM	XP%	Points
Jim Breech	14	12	85.7%	38	37	97.4%	73

Player	Punts	Yards	Long	Blkd	Avg.
Lee Johnson	61	2446	62	2	40.1

=== Special teams ===
Player	KR	KRYards	KRAvg	KRLong	KRTD	PR	PRYards	PRAvg	PRLong	PRTD
Stanford Jennings	26	525	20.2	33	0	0	0	0.0	0	0
Mike Martin	0	0	0.0	0	0	15	107	7.1	17	0

== Awards and records ==
=== Pro Bowl selections ===
- Boomer Esiason QB, AFC Pro Bowl selection
- Rodney Holman TE, AFC Pro Bowl selection
- James Brooks RB, AFC Pro Bowl selection
- David Fulcher SS, AFC Pro Bowl selection
- Anthony Muñoz LT, AFC Pro Bowl selection

=== Milestones ===
- Boomer Esiason, 5th straight 3,000-yard season
- James Brooks, 2nd 1,000-yard season (1,239 yards)
- Tim McGee, 1st 1,000-yard season (1,211 yards)
