= Benjamin Peterson =

Benjamin or Ben Peterson may refer to:

- Ben Peterson (wrestler) (born 1950), Olympic wrestler
- Benjamin Peterson (bishop) (born 1954), American Orthodox bishop
- Ben Peterson (American football) (born 1977), American football player
