= List of Long Beach State 49ers in the NFL draft =

This is a list of Long Beach State 49ers football players in the NFL draft.

== Key ==
B	Back	K	Kicker	NT	Nose tackle
C	Center	LB	Linebacker	FB	Fullback
DB	Defensive back	P	Punter	HB	Halfback
DE	Defensive end	QB	Quarterback	WR	Wide receiver
DT	Defensive tackle	RB	Running back	G	Guard
E	End	T	Offensive tackle	TE	Tight end

== Draft picks ==
Year	Round	Pick	Overall	Player	Team	Position
1962	19	2	254	Lynn Hoyem	Dallas Cowboys	G-T
1966	12	3	173	Les Shy	Dallas Cowboys	RB
1967	13	10	178	Roy Schmidt	Green Bay Packers	G-T
1967	9	14	225	Steve Newell	San Diego Chargers	WR
1968	9	1	220	Phil Johnson	Cincinnati Bengals	DB
1971	1	13	13	Leon Burns	San Diego Chargers	RB
1971	6	16	146	Billy Parks	San Diego Chargers	WR
1972	6	23	153	John Kahler	Kansas City Chiefs	DE
1972	7	11	167	Jim Fassel	Chicago Bears	QB
1972	11	10	270	John Turner	San Diego Chargers	TE
1972	12	11	297	Jeff Severson	Washington Redskins	DB
1972	16	17	407	Jim Kirby	Los Angeles Rams	WR
1973	3	11	63	Terry Metcalf	St. Louis Cardinals	RB-WR
1974	14	3	341	Greg Bailey	San Diego Chargers	DB
1974	15	8	372	Leonard Gray	San Francisco 49ers	TE
1975	8	20	202	Louis Lauriano	St. Louis Cardinals	DB
1976	3	8	68	Russ Bolinger	Detroit Lions	G-T
1976	9	16	253	Leanell Jones	Detroit Lions	TE
1976	10	8	273	Herb Lusk	Philadelphia Eagles	RB
1977	4	8	92	Mark Bailey	Kansas City Chiefs	RB
1978	1	24	24	Dan Bunz	San Francisco 49ers	LB
1981	3	4	60	Ben Rudolph	New York Jets	DT-DE
1981	10	13	261	Steve Folsom	Miami Dolphins	TE
1982	2	27	55	Dean Miraldi	Philadelphia Eagles	T-G
1984	8	20	216	John Puzar	Seattle Seahawks	C
1984	9	12	235	Mike Horan	Atlanta Falcons	P
1985	3	11	67	David Howard	Minnesota Vikings	LB
1985	3	13	69	John Hendy	San Diego Chargers	DB
1985	7	4	170	Ron Johnson	Seattle Seahawks	WR
1985	Suppl.			Thomas Fowler	San Diego Chargers	WR
1986	4	17	99	Doug Gaynor	Cincinnati Bengals	QB
1987	3	10	66	Charles Lockett	Pittsburgh Steelers	WR
1989	4	3	87	Jeff Graham	Green Bay Packers	QB
1991	5	27	138	Shawn Wilbourn	Buffalo Bills	DB
1991	12	15	322	R. J. Kors	Seattle Seahawks	DB
1994	7	4	198	Jay Walker	New England Patriots	QB
1995	6	25	196	Terrell Davis	Denver Broncos	RB
