= Boomer Esiason =

American football player and commentator (born 1961)

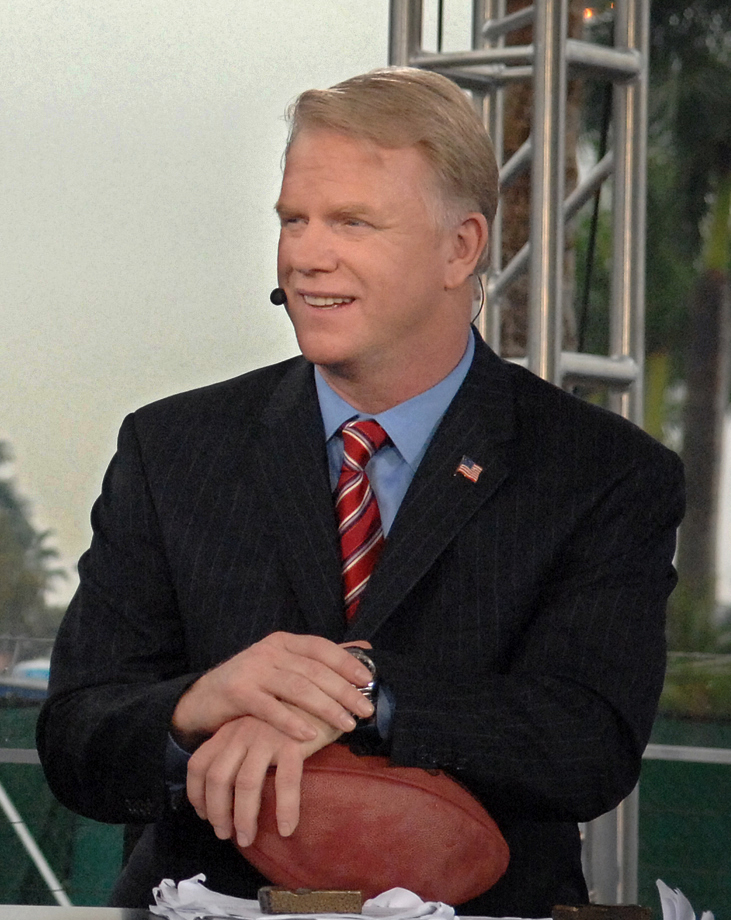
- Esiason in 2007

No. 7
- Position: Quarterback

Personal information
- Born: April 17, 1961 (age 65); East Islip, New York, U.S.
- Listed height: 6 ft 5 in (1.96 m)
- Listed weight: 224 lb (102 kg)

Career information
- High school: East Islip
- College: Maryland (1979–1983)
- NFL draft: 1984: 2nd round, 38th overall pick

Career history
- Cincinnati Bengals (1984–1992); New York Jets (1993–1995); Arizona Cardinals (1996); Cincinnati Bengals (1997)

Awards and highlights
- NFL Most Valuable Player (1988); NFL Man of the Year (1995); NFL Player of the Year (1988); First-team All-Pro (1988); 4× Pro Bowl (1986, 1988, 1989, 1993); NFL passer rating leader (1988); Cincinnati Bengals Ring of Honor; Cincinnati Bengals 50th Anniversary Team

Career NFL statistics
- Passing attempts: 5,205
- Passing completions: 2,969
- Completion percentage: 57.0%
- TD–INT: 247–184
- Passing yards: 37,920
- Passer rating: 81.1
- Stats at Pro Football Reference

Norman Julius "Boomer" Esiason (/əˈsaɪ.əsən/; born April 17, 1961) is an American former National Football League (NFL) quarterback. He played college football for the Maryland Terrapins and was selected in the second round of the 1984 NFL draft by the Cincinnati Bengals, where he spent 10 seasons. Esiason was also a member of the New York Jets and Arizona Cardinals.

Esiason's most successful season was in 1988 when he won NFL Most Valuable Player (MVP) and led the Bengals to an appearance in Super Bowl XXIII, which ended in a close defeat. He also received four Pro Bowl selections and one first-team All-Pro honor. After nine years in Cincinnati, Esiason spent three seasons with the Jets and one season with the Cardinals before returning to the Bengals for his final season in 1997.

Since retiring from football, Esiason has worked as a football analyst for CBS Sports on The NFL Today and Showtime's Inside the NFL and was previously with ABC, HBO, and Westwood One. He also hosts the morning sports radio program Boomer and Gio on WFAN in New York.

== Early life ==
Esiason was born and raised in East Islip, New York. He got the "Boomer" nickname before he was born. His mother Irene, reacting to his constant kicking in the womb, called him "Boomer," and he has kept the name since. Irene, a singer, dancer and piano player, died at the age of 37, of ovarian cancer when he was six years old. His father Norman, a veteran of WWII, never remarried, and in spite of a three-hour daily commute to New York City raised Esiason and his two sisters.

He attended Timber Point Elementary and East Islip High School, where he graduated in 1979. In high school, he was a three-sport varsity player in football, basketball, and baseball.

== College career ==
Esiason played college football at the University of Maryland for head coaches Jerry Claiborne and Bobby Ross and offensive coordinator Ralph Friedgen. Maryland was the only college to offer him a scholarship. At Maryland, he set 17 school records. He completed 461 of 850 passes (54.2 percent) for 6,169 yards and 42 touchdowns with 27 interceptions. He was a two-time honorable mention All-American in 1982 and 1983. In his final home game, he threw two third-quarter touchdown passes to lead a comeback victory over No. 3 North Carolina and seal the ACC title. At Maryland, his backup and roommate was future NFL quarterback and head coach Frank Reich. Boomer graduated in December 1983 with a B.A. in Communications, and received the Distinguished Alumnus Award in 1999.

== Professional football career ==
=== Cincinnati Bengals (first stint) ===
Esiason was selected by the Cincinnati Bengals in the second round of the 1984 NFL draft with the 38th overall pick, surprisingly low considering his successful college career. ESPN draft analyst Mel Kiper Jr. was, in Esiason's words, "going ballistic" that he was still available in the latter stages of the first round. No quarterbacks were drafted in the first round; Esiason was actually the first quarterback selected. (Steve Young had signed with the L.A. Express of the now-defunct United States Football League.) Esiason's USFL territorial rights were controlled by the Washington Federals, the worst team in the league.

Esiason's teammate from Maryland, defensive end Pete Koch, was taken by the Bengals with the 16th pick in the first round of the same draft. Koch lasted just one season in Cincinnati and five total in the NFL.

At 6'-5" and 224 pounds, and with a powerful arm, Esiason was the signal caller on one of the most potent offenses of the late 1980s.

Boomer got his first pro start on October 7, 1984, in a home game against the Houston Oilers. On a rainy day, he led the Bengals to a 13–3 win over Houston, and scored the game's only touchdown on a three-yard run. He took over for Ken Anderson as the Bengals' full-time starting quarterback on September 22, 1985, in a 44–41 home loss to the San Diego Chargers and future Hall of Famer Dan Fouts. Although well short of Anderson's rushing total of over 2,200 yards, Esiason was surprisingly mobile, rushing for 1,598 yards on 447 attempts and scoring seven touchdowns by this point in his career. He became particularly adept at running the difficult "no huddle" offense devised by Bengals head coach Sam Wyche.

On December 21, 1986, the final game of the 1986 season, Esiason set a team record by throwing five touchdown passes, as the Bengals defeated the New York Jets 52–21. He also set the team single season passing record of 3,959 yards in this game. It was the last game of Bengals' quarterback Ken Anderson's playing career.

After leading Cincinnati to six straight wins to begin the 1988 season, Esiason set a dismal single game team record on October 16 by throwing 5 interceptions in a 27–21 loss to the New England Patriots. The team finished the season 12–4, utilizing the highest scoring offense in the NFL, and securing the organization's fifth AFC Central division title. Esiason finished the season as the NFL's top rated passer. However, he had sprained his left ankle and the index finger on his throwing hand in the last regular-season game of the season. In the playoffs, Cincinnati, bolstered by rushing, defeated first the Seattle Seahawks and then the Buffalo Bills to reach Super Bowl XXIII, the franchise's second appearance in a Super Bowl (after Super Bowl XVI), as they faced off with the team they had lost to the first time around, the San Francisco 49ers.

The Super Bowl was a tight affair that saw a 3–3 halftime score, the first halftime tie in Super Bowl history. Still marred by a sore arm, Esiason threw for 144 yards on 11-of-25 passing with an interception. Cincinnati had their points come on a kickoff return by Stanford Jennings and three field goals by Jim Breech. Bengals cornerback Lewis Billups dropped what seemed like a sure interception in the end zone when they were up 13–6 on a drive that led to a San Francisco touchdown. Despite this, they led 16–13 with three minutes remaining and San Francisco deep in their own territory. The 49ers, led by future Hall of Fame quarterback Joe Montana, marched 92 yards on their last drive, scoring on a touchdown pass to receiver John Taylor with 34 seconds remaining in the game. A last-ditch pass by Esiason to wide receiver Cris Collinsworth was broken up, resulting in a 20–16 loss for the Bengals.

On October 29, 1989, Esiason tied his own record for touchdown passes in a game with five, as the Bengals demolished the Tampa Bay Buccaneers 56–23. In that same game, the Bengals tied a team record with eight touchdowns.

On October 7, 1990, he threw for 490 yards (a single game team passing record) in a 34–31 victory over the Los Angeles Rams.

=== New York Jets ===
Before the 1993 season, Esiason was traded to his hometown team, the New York Jets, in exchange for a third round pick that year (which became linebacker Steve Tovar) as well as a conditional second round pick the following year (which did not kick in). The trade reunited Esiason with Bruce Coslet, Esiason's mentor as offensive coordinator in Cincinnati, who had been hired by the Jets' to be their head coach after the Bengals 1988 Super Bowl run. Esiason played three seasons for the Jets, each year under a different head coach: Coslet (1993), Pete Carroll (1994), and Rich Kotite (1995). During his 1995 season with the team, Esiason was seriously injured in a game on October 8 against the Buffalo Bills when rookie Everett McIver was whistled for a false start, and Bruce Smith of the Bills raced around him and caught Esiason under his face mask. Smith was terribly upset about Esiason's injury, saying that he hadn't heard a whistle blowing the play dead, and Esiason blamed the officials for not whistling until after Smith made contact. That horrific collision gave Esiason a severe concussion, his first as a player. When he returned to the field over a month later, it was coincidentally against the Bills.

Esiason was released by the Jets after the 1995 season.

=== Arizona Cardinals ===
Esiason signed with the Arizona Cardinals as a free agent in 1996. It was during this season, on November 10, 1996, that he threw for the fifth best passing yardage day in NFL history, with 522 yards in a 37–34 overtime victory over the Washington Redskins. Two weeks later he led a fourth-quarter comeback against the playoff-bound Philadelphia Eagles.

=== Cincinnati Bengals (second stint) ===
Esiason contemplated retirement in the offseason, but was talked into playing one more season with the Bengals, now with Coslet as coach. He was effective after replacing Jeff Blake midway through the 1997 campaign, throwing for 13 touchdowns against only two interceptions, and garnering a passer rating of 106.9 for the season. The Bengals were 3–8 with Blake under center. With Esiason at quarterback, they won four of their last five games and scored over 30 points four times. Twice they broke 40 points, in a 44–42 loss to the Philadelphia Eagles and in a 41–14 win over the Tennessee Oilers. Esiason debated closely for playing in 1998, since he liked playing for Coslet and quarterbacks coach Ken Anderson, stating that a contract offer good enough for him to not refuse would've turned the table for him to return, as he was offered an analyst's position on ABC's Monday Night Football for the third year in a row.

On December 21, 1997, Esiason played his last NFL game. He threw two touchdowns on the day, with a 79-yard touchdown pass to wide receiver Darnay Scott being his last touchdown pass in a 16–14 victory over the Baltimore Ravens.

== NFL career statistics ==
Legend
	AP NFL MVP
	Led the league
**Bold**	Career high

Year	Team	Games			Passing								
Year	Team	GP	GS	Record	Cmp	Att	Pct	Yds	Avg	TD	Int	Lng	Rtg
1984	CIN	10	4	3–1	51	102	50.0	530	5.2	3	3	6	62.9
1985	CIN	15	14	7–7	251	431	58.2	3,443	9.0	27	12	68	93.2
1986	CIN	16	16	10–6	273	469	58.2	**3,959**	8.4	24	17	57	87.7
1987	CIN	12	12	3–9	240	440	54.5	3,321	7.5	16	19	61	73.1
1988	CIN	16	16	**12–4**	223	388	57.5	3,572	**9.2**	**28**	14	**86**	97.4
1989	CIN	16	15	7–8	258	455	56.7	3,525	7.8	**28**	11	74	92.1
1990	CIN	16	16	9–7	224	402	55.7	3,031	7.5	24	**22**	53	77.0
1991	CIN	14	14	3–11	233	413	56.4	2,883	7.0	13	16	53	72.5
1992	CIN	12	11	4–7	144	278	51.8	1,407	5.1	11	15	38	57.0
1993	NYJ	16	16	8–8	**288**	**473**	60.9	3,421	7.2	16	11	77	84.5
1994	NYJ	15	14	5–9	255	440	58.0	2,782	6.3	17	13	69	77.3
1995	NYJ	12	12	2–10	221	389	56.8	2,275	5.8	16	15	43	71.4
1996	ARI	10	8	3–5	190	339	56.0	2,293	6.8	11	14	64	70.6
1997	CIN	7	5	4–1	118	186	**63.4**	1,478	8.0	13	2	77	**106.9**
Career		187	173	80–93	2,969	5,205	57.0	37,920	7.3	247	184	86	81.1

== Records and honors ==
Esiason was named to four Pro Bowl games (1986, 1988, 1989, 1993) and holds several NFL career records for left-handed quarterbacks, including most touchdown passes (247), passing yards (37,920), and completions (2,969). He also led the AFC in passing in both 1988 and 1989.

Among the awards he has earned during his career include the NFL Most Valuable Player Award in 1988 (leading the league with a passer rating of 97.4), and the Walter Payton Man of the Year Award in 1995 for his charitable work. At his retirement in 1997 he finished in the top 10 all-time in many QB career statistical categories.

Football Nation ranks him as the 25th greatest quarterback of the post-merger era.

Esiason was inducted into the Suffolk Sports Hall of Fame in the Football Category with the Class of 1990. In 2004, he was inducted into the Nassau County Sports Hall of Fame.

In 2023, the Bengals inducted Esiason into their Ring of Honor.

== Entertainment career ==
=== Television, film and literature ===
Esiason has appeared in over 25 commercials including ones for Diet Coke, Wheaties, Reebok, Samsung, Hanes, Doritos and Domino's Pizza. He has also appeared in many TV shows and movies, such as The Game Plan, Miss America 1999, Spin City, and Blue Bloods among others.

He made two appearances on the game show Family Feud. On March 18, 1989, he appeared in the episode "Bengals v. 49ers", reminiscent of their latest Super Bowl match. In 1993, his second Family Feud appearance came in the episode "NFC v. AFC".

He authored a children's reader in 1995 titled A Boy Named Boomer and co-wrote (with Lowell Cauffiel) a 1998 novel titled Toss.

He co-hosted the Miss America Pageant with Meredith Vieira on September 19, 1998, and co-hosted with Julie Chen Moonves the CBS broadcast of the 2002 Macy's Thanksgiving Day Parade.

He and partner Craig Carton served as judges on the May 29, 2011, episode of Iron Chef America.

He has co-hosted Super Bowl's Greatest Commercials from 2012 to 2023.

He made a cameo appearance as himself on the October 3, 2014, episode of Blue Bloods.

In 2015, he became the Commissioner of the FFL (Feline Football League) for Kitten Bowl II on the Hallmark Channel, and still holds that position today. He has provided analysis and commentary for all the Kitten Bowls since Kitten Bowl II, which airs during half time of the Super Bowl.

Esiason launched Game Time with Boomer Esiason, interviews with sports personalities from the past, on Saturday September 14, 2019.

=== Broadcasting ===
While still playing, Esiason appeared as a color analyst on the USA Network's two-year broadcast of the World League of American Football (WLAF) on Monday nights, partnered with Brad Nessler. After his retirement from playing, he went into broadcasting full-time. He was a color commentator for ABC's Monday Night Football from 1998 to 1999. Following his dismissal by ABC in 2000, due primarily to personal conflicts between him and play-by-play announcer Al Michaels, he was hired by the Westwood One radio network to become the lead analyst for radio broadcasts of Monday Night Football and Super Bowl games. He broadcast every Super Bowl from 2000 to 2018.

As planned, after broadcasting the Thursday Night Football game on September 6, 2018, he left Westwood One. He was quoted as saying "I'm going to miss it, but in all reality I kind of have to get part of my life back." He currently serves as an in-studio analyst Inside the NFL on Showtime, and hosts Boomer and Gio on WFAN Radio in New York and the CBS Sports Network. In September 2012, CBS Radio announced he was added to their collection of talent to deliver five sports updates per day Monday through Friday. Esiason was also an analyst for The NFL Today on CBS television from 2002 through 2023.

Starting in 2013, he began appearing once a week as a guest on The Jim Rome Show during the NFL season to break down the upcoming weekend's NFL action.

In February 2026, while on his WFAN Radio show, Esiason commented on statements by some United States Olympic athletes about representing their country, saying that American Olympians "should just pipe down and just do their sport and play for our country and respect the flag and respect everything that's going on." The remarks drew commentary from media figures including former ESPN producer Mike Ryan, who on The Dan Le Batard Show criticized Esiason's position and defended the athletes' public statements about political and social issues in the United States, stating, "They [Olympic athletes] are using their one moment, in most cases, to highlight that, because that is universally American."

=== WFAN morning show ===
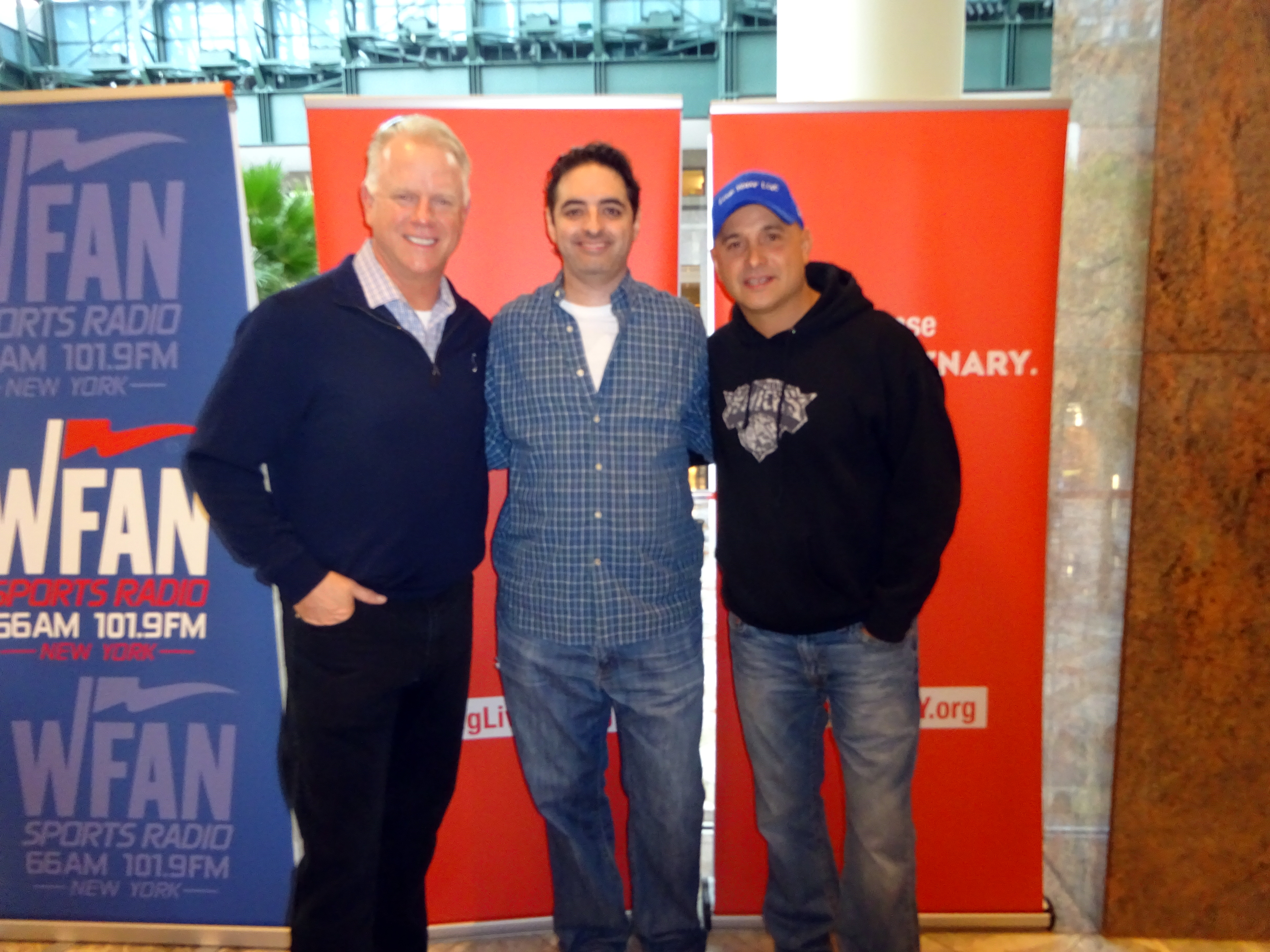
Esiason (left) with former co-host Craig Carton (right) in 2016

In April 2007, after the firing of Don Imus, CBS Radio gave Esiason a one-week "try-out" as Imus' replacement on WFAN. The station announced him as the permanent host on August 13, with radio veteran Craig Carton joining as co-host. Boomer and Carton officially started on September 4, 2007. As an analyst with Westwood One, Esiason would do the Monday morning show, travel to do the Monday Night Football game and travel back to New York in time to do the Tuesday morning show. The Boomer and Carton radio program became the number-one rated morning show in all key demographics in the greater New York listening area and was seen on the MSG Network from 2010 to 2013. On March 8, 2013, both Esiason and Carton worked the radio broadcast of a Brooklyn Nets basketball game. The radio program had been simulcast on the CBS Sports Network since January 2014.

Craig Carton was arrested in September 2017 and charged with operating a concert ticket Ponzi scheme. Carton then resigned from WFAN, leaving Esiason as the sole host of the show, which was rebranded The Morning Show with Boomer. Gregg Giannotti joined Boomer as permanent co-host starting on January 2, 2018, with the show rechristened as Boomer and Gio.

In 2026, Esiason was inducted into the Radio Hall of Fame.

== Personal life ==
In 1986, Esiason married his wife, Cheryl. They have two children, son Gunnar and daughter Sydney. Sydney is married to former professional hockey player Matt Martin.

Esiason and his family have lived in the village of Plandome, New York, since at least 1998.

Esiason is an avid ice hockey fan, and a devoted supporter of the New York Rangers. He is also a fan of the New York Mets and New York Knicks. As of 2019, he plays in up to 70 recreational-league hockey games a year. Gunnar and his father are teammates on their local hockey team. Esiason plays in the annual Mikey Strong Charity Hockey game with NHL alumni. His foundation sponsors the annual Guinness Cup Hockey Tournament.

== Boomer Esiason Foundation ==
The Boomer Esiason Foundation (BEF) was formed soon after Esiason's son, Gunnar, was diagnosed with cystic fibrosis in 1993. The Foundation was built to fund research to find a cure for cystic fibrosis. It also provides scholarships, transplant grants, hospital grants, and education and awareness of CF to help provide a higher quality of life for people with CF. The foundation has raised in excess of $100 million, and has supported numerous hospitals, including Cincinnati Children's Hospital with the Gunnar H Esiason CF/Lung Center and Columbia Presbyterian in NYC with the Gunnar H Esiason Adult CF and Lung Program. In 2018, the foundation awarded over $400,000 in scholarships to almost 100 students. The foundation is located in New York City and runs numerous events around the country. The foundation annually receives four stars from Charity Navigator.

In 1996, Esiason formed a partnership with Cantor Fitzgerald and Howard Lutnick (CEO) as the foundation offices were moved to the North Tower of the World Trade Center in lower Manhattan on the 101st floor, which was destroyed in 2001 in the September 11 attacks. All five full-time employees survived, as none were in the building at the time, but "Esiason figured he knew over 100 people personally" who were killed in the attack, including his best friend Tim O'Brien, who was a partner at Cantor.

== See also ==
- List of 500-yard passing games in the National Football League
- List of NFL quarterbacks who have posted a perfect passer rating

Preceded by Frank Gifford and Dan Dierdorf	Super Bowl television color commentator (non-cable prime-time package carrier); 1999	Succeeded by John Madden
