= Marquis Pleasant =

American football player (born 1965)

No. 81
- Position: Wide receiver

Personal information
- Born: June 28, 1965 (age 61); Dallas, Texas, U.S.
- Listed height: 6 ft 2 in (1.88 m)
- Listed weight: 172 lb (78 kg)

Career information
- High school: Justin F. Kimball (Dallas)
- College: SMU
- NFL draft: 1987: undrafted

Career history
- Cincinnati Bengals (1987)
- Stats at Pro Football Reference

Marquis Anthony Pleasant (born June 28, 1965) is an American former professional football player who was a wide receiver for the Cincinnati Bengals of the National Football League (NFL). After playing college football for the SMU Mustangs, Pleasant played with the Bengals in 1987.

Pleasant scored the Mustangs only touchdown in the 1983 Sun Bowl against Alabama.
