= James Brooks (running back) =

American football player (born 1958)

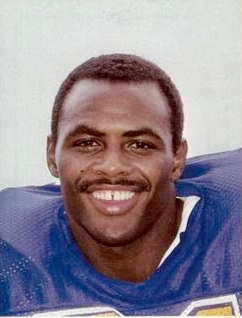
- Brooks with the San Diego Chargers c. 1982

No. 21, 28, 20
- Position: Running back

Personal information
- Born: December 28, 1958 (age 67); Warner Robins, Georgia, U.S.
- Listed height: 5 ft 10 in (1.78 m)
- Listed weight: 177 lb (80 kg)

Career information
- High school: Warner Robins
- College: Auburn (1977–1980)
- NFL draft: 1981: 1st round, 24th overall pick

Career history
- San Diego Chargers (1981–1983); Cincinnati Bengals (1984–1991); Cleveland Browns (1992); Tampa Bay Buccaneers (1992)

Awards and highlights
- 4× Pro Bowl (1986, 1988–1990); NFL kickoff return yards leader (1982); 2× Second-team All-American (1979, 1980); 2× First-team All-SEC (1979, 1980); Cincinnati Bengals Ring of Honor; Cincinnati Bengals 40th Anniversary Team; Cincinnati Bengals 50th Anniversary Team

Career NFL statistics
- Rushing yards: 7,962
- Rushing average: 4.7
- Rushing touchdowns: 49
- Stats at Pro Football Reference

James Robert Brooks (born December 28, 1958) is an American former professional football player who was a running back in the National Football League (NFL). He played college football for the Auburn Tigers and was selected by the San Diego Chargers in the first round of the 1981 NFL draft. He played for four teams in the NFL, earning all four of his Pro Bowl selections with the Cincinnati Bengals.

== Early life and college ==
Brooks led the Warner Robins High School Demons to both state and national championships in 1976. He graduated with the school record for rushing, a record that stood until Willie Reid broke his record years later. Brooks played college football at Auburn University from 1977 until 1980 and earned All-American status, setting school records for kickoff-return yards (1,726) and all-purpose yards (5,596) while also scoring 30 touchdowns.

== Professional career ==
Brooks was selected with the 24th pick in the first round of the 1981 NFL draft, and played professionally with the San Diego Chargers (1981–1983), Cincinnati Bengals (1984–1991), Cleveland Browns (1992) and Tampa Bay Buccaneers (1992).

He was a key participant in two of the most famous games in NFL lore during his rookie season with the Chargers: The Epic in Miami and the Freezer Bowl. However, he started only seven games in three seasons with the Chargers, always second on the team to Chuck Muncie in rushing attempts and yards. He had only one 100-yard game with the Chargers, a 12-carry, 105-yard, three-touchdown outing against his future teammates. In 1984, he was traded to the Bengals for Pete Johnson, a move still widely regarded as the best trade in Bengals franchise history, as Johnson would play only one more season in the NFL before retiring.

A four-time Pro Bowler (1986, 1988–1990), Brooks excelled at running, receiving and kick returning. He was noted for his ability to make yards after contact and continue fighting for extra inches while being tackled. By the time he left the Bengals in 1991, he was the team's all-time leading rusher with 6,447 yards (since surpassed by Corey Dillon's 8,061 yards), and is still among the Bengals' top 15 all-time leading receivers with 297 receptions for 3,012 yards. By the time of his retirement after the 1992 season, Brooks amassed 7,962 rushing yards, 383 receptions for 3,621 receiving yards, 565 punt return yards, 2,762 kickoff return yards and scored 79 touchdowns (49 rushing and 30 receiving). He was the fourth player to have recorded 30 receiving and 30 rushing touchdowns each (only seven players have reached the milestone in NFL history). He retired with 14,910 all-purpose yards, which was fifth in league history (as of 2026, he still ranks in the top 50).

Though he started every game in 1985, he and fullback Larry Kinnebrew finished the season with almost identical carry and yardage stats. His breakthrough season was 1986, which included a memorable run in a December 7 contest against the New England Patriots in which Brooks made several cutbacks, broke several tackles and dragged defenders the final five yards across the goal line for a 56-yard touchdown run. He finished the game with 163 yards rushing and 101 yards receiving, one of only two 100/100 games in Bengals history. This was his sixth season in the league, but the first in which he reached 1,000 rushing yards (a then-franchise record 1,087 rushing yards) and the Pro Bowl. After missing half of the 1987 season with an injury, he returned with 931 yards and career-bests in rushing touchdowns (eight) and receiving touchdowns (six) in 1988 and was instrumental in the Bengals' run to Super Bowl XXIII. In 1989, he finished with a career-best/franchise-record 1,239 rushing yards (seventh in the NFL) and again broke 1,000 yards in 1990, including a 201-yard performance against the Houston Oilers. Brooks started 1991 with two games with more than 100 rushing yards, but had progressively fewer carries over the rest of the season (102 rushes for two touchdowns and a 3.3 yards-per-carry average, never once breaking 50 yards over the next 12 games). He was traded to the Browns in 1992, then to the Buccaneers midway through the season, retiring after a minor injury in the team's sixth game.

== NFL career statistics ==
Legend
**Bold**	Career high

Year	Team	GP	Att	Yds	Avg	Lng	TD	Rec	Yds	Avg	Lng	TD
1981	SD	14	109	525	4.8	28	3	46	329	7.2	29	3
1982	SD	9	87	430	4.9	48	6	13	66	5.1	12	0
1983	SD	15	127	516	4.1	61	3	25	215	8.6	36	0
1984	CIN	15	103	396	3.8	33	2	34	268	7.9	27	2
1985	CIN	16	192	929	4.8	39	7	**55**	576	10.5	**57**	5
1986	CIN	16	205	1,087	5.3	56	5	54	**686**	**12.7**	54	4
1987	CIN	9	94	280	3.1	18	1	22	272	12.4	46	2
1988	CIN	15	182	931	5.1	51	**8**	29	287	9.9	28	**6**
1989	CIN	16	**221**	**1,239**	**5.6**	**65**	7	37	306	8.3	25	2
1990	CIN	16	195	1,004	5.1	56	5	26	269	10.3	35	4
1991	CIN	15	152	571	3.8	25	2	40	348	8.7	40	2
1992	TB	2	5	6	1.2	4	0	0	0	0.0	0	0
1992	CLE	4	13	38	2.9	13	0	2	-1	-0.5	4	0
Career		162	1,685	7,962	4.7	65	49	383	3,621	9.5	57	30

=== Cincinnati Bengals franchise records ===
As of 2022, Brooks holds at least five Bengals franchise records, including:

- Rush yards/attempt: career 4.8, season 5.61 in 1989
- Yards from scrimmage in a season: 1,773 in 1986
- All-purpose yards in a season: 1,773 in 1986
- Games with 3+ touchdowns scored in a season: 2 in 1988

== Personal life ==
Brooks was arrested in 1999 for failure to pay child support, owing over $110,000. During proceedings, it was revealed that Brooks was illiterate, despite having received a college degree. When asked by the judge how he had graduated from Auburn, Brooks said, "I didn’t have to go to class." He served three months of a six-month sentence before being assigned to a work-release program.
