= Scott Fulhage =

American football player (born 1961)

No. 17
- Position: Punter

Personal information
- Born: November 17, 1961 (age 64); Beloit, Kansas, U.S.
- Listed height: 5 ft 11 in (1.80 m)
- Listed weight: 185 lb (84 kg)

Career information
- High school: Beloit (Beloit, Kansas)
- College: Kansas State
- NFL draft: 1985: undrafted

Career history
- Buffalo Bills (1985)*; Washington Redskins (1986)*; Green Bay Packers (1987); Cincinnati Bengals (1987–1988); Atlanta Falcons (1989–1992)
- * Offseason or practice squad member only

Awards and highlights
- Second-team All-Big Eight (1983)

Career NFL statistics
- Punts: 399
- Punting yards: 16,513
- Average punt: 41.4
- Stats at Pro Football Reference

Scott Alan Fulhage (born November 17, 1961) is a former National Football League (NFL) punter who played for the Cincinnati Bengals from 1987 to 1988 and the Atlanta Falcons from 1989 to 1992.

== College career ==
Scott played college football at Kansas State University and is one of four players to be the starting punter four years straight.

== Professional career ==
Scott Fulhage went undrafted in 1987 after a very successful college career and was signed in the off season by the Cincinnati Bengals. Fulhage was part of the 1988 Cincinnati Bengals team that made a run to Super Bowl XXIII, where the Bengals fell to the San Francisco 49ers 20–16. In the Super Bowl, Fulhage punted 5 times for 221 yards. Fulhage was considered one of the most consistent punters in 1989, leading the NFC with 24 punts inside the opponents' 20-yard line, and finishing third in the NFL with 84 attempts. In 6 years of playing in the NFL, Fulhage successfully completed one fake punt against the San Francisco 49ers, a 12-yard pass for a successful first down, in the 1989 season during his time with the Atlanta Falcons. Fulhage is also credited with two rushing attempts, during the 1989 and 1992 seasons, but gained a total of 0 yards. Although he started with a slow career he picked up the pace. The remainder of his statistics show consistency and a solid history as a punter, with only one fumble in those six years. He played in 88 games, punted 399 times for a total of 16,513 yards (averaging just over 41 yards per punt) with a long of 65 yards.

== NFL career statistics ==
Legend
**Bold**	Career high

=== Regular season ===
Year	Team	Punting									
Year	Team	GP	Punts	Yds	Net Yds	Lng	Avg	Net Avg	Blk	Ins20	TB
1987	CIN	11	52	2,168	1,852	58	41.7	35.6	0	10	5
1988	CIN	13	44	1,672	1,352	53	38.0	29.4	**2**	13	5
1989	ATL	**16**	**84**	**3,472**	2,832	**65**	41.3	33.3	1	**24**	**9**
1990	ATL	**16**	70	2,913	2,519	59	41.6	36.0	0	15	4
1991	ATL	**16**	81	3,470	**2,963**	60	**42.8**	**36.6**	0	21	6
1992	ATL	**16**	68	2,818	2,276	56	41.4	33.0	1	11	3
Career		88	399	16,513	13,794	65	41.4	34.2	4	94	32

=== Playoffs ===
Year	Team	Punting									
Year	Team	GP	Punts	Yds	Net Yds	Lng	Avg	Net Avg	Blk	Ins20	TB
1991	ATL	2	5	211	183	47	42.2	36.6	0	2	0
Career		2	5	211	183	47	42.2	36.6	0	2	0
