= Sam Manos =

American football player (born 1962)

No. 58
- Position: Center

Personal information
- Born: October 2, 1962 (age 64); New Castle, Pennsylvania, U.S.
- Listed height: 6 ft 3 in (1.91 m)
- Listed weight: 265 lb (120 kg)

Career information
- High school: New Castle; Massanutten Military Academy
- College: Marshall
- NFL draft: 1987: undrafted

Career history
- Cincinnati Bengals (1987)

Career NFL statistics
- Games played: 3
- Games started: 3
- Fumble recoveries: 1
- Stats at Pro Football Reference

Samuel John Manos (born October 2, 1962) is an American former professional football player who was a center for the Cincinnati Bengals of the National Football League (NFL). He played college football for the Marshall Thundering Herd and was an All-American, being inducted into the school's hall of fame in 2011.
