= Bill Berthusen =

American football player (born 1964)

No. 79
- Position: Defensive lineman

Personal information
- Born: June 26, 1964 (age 62); Grinnell, Iowa, U.S.
- Listed height: 6 ft 5 in (1.96 m)
- Listed weight: 285 lb (129 kg)

Career information
- High school: Marshalltown
- College: Iowa State
- NFL draft: 1987: 12th round, 321st overall pick

Career history
- Cincinnati Bengals (1987); New York Giants (1987)

Career NFL statistics
- Sacks: 2.5
- Fumble recoveries: 1
- Stats at Pro Football Reference

Bill Berthusen (born June 26, 1964) is an American former professional football player. A 6-feet 5-inch and 285 pounds defensive lineman, he played college football for Iowa State and later professionally for the New York Giants and Cincinnati Bengals in the NFL. He was selected by the Giants in the 12th round of the 1987 NFL draft.
