= Tom Brown (wide receiver) =

American football player (born 1963)

No. 80
- Position: Wide receiver

Personal information
- Born: December 24, 1963 (age 62); Princeton, Minnesota, U.S.
- Listed height: 6 ft 4 in (1.93 m)
- Listed weight: 190 lb (86 kg)

Career information
- High school: Milaca (MN)
- College: Augustana (South Dakota)
- NFL draft: 1986: undrafted

Career history
- St. Louis Cardinals (1986)*; Cincinnati Bengals (1987)
- * Offseason or practice squad member only

Career NFL statistics
- Games played: 2
- Stats at Pro Football Reference

Thomas William Brown (born December 24, 1963) is an American former professional football player who was a wide receiver for the Cincinnati Bengals of the National Football League (NFL). He played in two games in the 1987 season after playing College football for the Augustana Vikings in South Dakota.
