= David McCluskey =

American football player (1963–2023)

No. 40
- Position: Running back

Personal information
- Born: November 5, 1963; Rome, Georgia, U.S.
- Died: September 18, 2023 (aged 59); Rome, Georgia, U.S.
- Listed height: 6 ft 1 in (1.85 m)
- Listed weight: 227 lb (103 kg)

Career information
- High school: West Rome
- College: Georgia
- NFL draft: 1987: 10th round, 269th overall pick

Career history
- Cincinnati Bengals (1987); Atlanta Falcons (1988)*
- * Offseason or practice squad member only

Career NFL statistics
- Rushing yards: 94
- Rushing average: 3.2
- Touchdowns: 1
- Stats at Pro Football Reference

David Eugene McCluskey (November 5, 1963 – September 18, 2023) was an American professional football player who was a running back for the Cincinnati Bengals of the National Football League (NFL). He played college football for the Georgia Bulldogs.

Pre-draft measurables
Height	Weight	Arm length	Hand span	40-yard dash	10-yard split	20-yard split	20-yard shuttle	Vertical jump	Broad jump
6 ft 0 in (1.83 m)	221 lb (100 kg)	31 1/2 in (0.80 m)	9 1/4 in (0.23 m)	4.71 s	1.70 s	2.79 s	4.37 s	22.5 in (0.57 m)	8 ft 5 in (2.57 m)
All values from NFL Combine

== Later life and ministry ==
Following his athletic career, McCluskey returned to Northwest Georgia, settling in the Rome and Cedartown areas where he dedicated his life to community service and youth mentorship. He focused heavily on localized outreach, serving as a pillar of support for regional youth initiatives and providing guidance to young people facing personal hardships. McCluskey later entered full-time ministry, serving as a prominent Bishop and Senior Pastor at the Glorious New Jerusalem Church in Rome. He remained an active spiritual and community leader until his passing on September 18, 2023.
