= Dan Rice (American football) =

American football player (born 1963)

No. 46
- Position: Running back

Personal information
- Born: November 9, 1963 (age 62); Boston, Massachusetts, U.S.
- Listed height: 6 ft 1 in (1.85 m)
- Listed weight: 241 lb (109 kg)

Career information
- High school: West Roxbury
- College: Michigan
- NFL draft: 1987: undrafted

Career history
- New Orleans Saints (1987)*; Cincinnati Bengals (1987); Buffalo Bills (1988)*; Cincinnati Bengals (1988)*
- * Offseason or practice squad member only

Career NFL statistics
- Rushing yards: 59
- Rushing average: 3.3
- Stats at Pro Football Reference

Daniel Jerome Rice (born November 9, 1963) is an American former professional football player who was a running back for the Cincinnati Bengals of the National Football League (NFL). He played college football for the Michigan Wolverines.
