= Greg Meehan (American football) =

American football player (born 1963)

No. 85
- Position: Wide receiver

Personal information
- Born: April 27, 1963 (age 63); Otis AFB, Massachusetts, U.S.
- Listed height: 6 ft 0 in (1.83 m)
- Listed weight: 191 lb (87 kg)

Career information
- High school: Shadow Mountain
- College: Bowling Green
- NFL draft: 1986: undrafted

Career history
- San Diego Chargers (1986)*; Cincinnati Bengals (1987)
- * Offseason or practice squad member only

Career NFL statistics
- Receptions: 3
- Receiving yards: 25
- Rushing yards: 19
- Rushing average: 4.8
- Stats at Pro Football Reference

Gregory Allen Meehan (born April 27, 1963) is an American former professional football player who was a wide receiver for the Cincinnati Bengals of the National Football League (NFL). He played college football for the Bowling Green Falcons.
