= David Ward (linebacker) =

American football player (born 1964)

No. 51, 94
- Position: Linebacker

Personal information
- Born: March 10, 1964 (age 62); Helena, Arkansas, U.S.
- Listed height: 6 ft 2 in (1.88 m)
- Listed weight: 230 lb (104 kg)

Career information
- High school: Central
- College: Southern Arkansas
- NFL draft: 1987: undrafted

Career history
- New England Patriots (1987)*; Cincinnati Bengals (1987); New England Patriots (1988–1989); Kansas City Chiefs (1990)*; Winnipeg Blue Bombers (1990); San Antonio Riders (1992)*
- * Offseason or practice squad member only

David Fontaine Ward (born March 10, 1964) is an American former professional football player who was a linebacker for the Cincinnati Bengals and the New England Patriots of the National Football League (NFL). He played college football for the Southern Arkansas Muleriders. He also played professionally in the Canadian Football League (CFL) for the Winnipeg Blue Bombers.
