= Ben Peterson (American football) =

American football player (born 1977)

No. 50
- Position: Linebacker

Personal information
- Born: March 27, 1977 (age 49); Clay Center, Kansas
- Listed height: 6 ft 3 in (1.91 m)
- Listed weight: 250 lb (113 kg)

Career information
- High school: Clay Center
- College: Pittsburg State
- NFL draft: 1999: undrafted

Career history
- Cincinnati Bengals (1999)

Career NFL statistics
- Games played: 3
- Stats at Pro Football Reference

Ben Peterson (born March 27, 1977) is an American former professional football player who was a linebacker in the National Football League (NFL). He played three games for the Cincinnati Bengals in the National Football League (NFL). He played college football for the Pittsburg State Gorillas.
