= Tim Inglis =

American football player (born 1964)

No. 92
- Position: Linebacker

Personal information
- Born: March 10, 1964 (age 62); Toledo, Ohio, U.S.
- Listed height: 6 ft 3 in (1.91 m)
- Listed weight: 232 lb (105 kg)

Career information
- High school: Toledo (OH) St. John's Jesuit
- College: Toledo
- NFL draft: 1987: undrafted

Career history
- Cincinnati Bengals (1987–1988); Green Bay Packers (1989)*
- * Offseason or practice squad member only

Awards and highlights
- First-team All-MAC (1985); Second-team All-MAC (1986)
- Stats at Pro Football Reference

Tim Inglis (born March 10, 1964) is an American former professional football linebacker. He played for the Cincinnati Bengals from 1987 to 1988.
