= Daryl Smith (defensive back) =

American football player (born 1963)

Daryl Dimitri Smith (born May 8, 1963) is an American former professional football player who was a defensive back in the National Football League (NFL) from 1985 to 1989. He played college football for the North Alabama Lions.

Born in Opelika, Alabama, he attended Opelika High School and the University of North Alabama before being selected by the Denver Broncos in the ninth round (249th overall) of the 1985 NFL draft. He did not play in either of his first two seasons in the league, and by 1987, he had joined the Cincinnati Bengals. He played three times that season, all starts, logging an interception in each of his first two games. After a 30-day suspension for violation of the league's drug policy, he then played seven times in 1988, but did not start any of those games and did not record a statistic. He joined the Minnesota Vikings for the 1989 season, playing five times (one start), but again did not record any statistics. His brother, Brian also played in the NFL for the Los Angeles Rams from 1989 to 1990.
