= Nate Borders =

American football player (born 1963)

No. 32
- Position: Defensive back

Personal information
- Born: June 11, 1963 (age 63); Ellwood City, Pennsylvania, U.S.
- Listed height: 5 ft 10 in (1.78 m)
- Listed weight: 190 lb (86 kg)

Career information
- High school: Riverside
- College: Indiana
- NFL draft: 1985: undrafted

Career history
- Cincinnati Bengals (1987)

Career NFL statistics
- Games played: 3
- Stats at Pro Football Reference

Nathan Wayne Borders (born June 11, 1963) is an American former professional football player who was a defensive back for the Cincinnati Bengals of the National Football League (NFL). He played college football for the Indiana Hoosiers.
