= Dave Romasko =

American football player (born 1961)

No. 83
- Position: Tight end

Personal information
- Born: November 3, 1963 (age 63); Pocatello, Idaho, U.S.
- Listed height: 6 ft 3 in (1.91 m)
- Listed weight: 241 lb (109 kg)

Career information
- High school: Pocatello
- College: Idaho, Carroll (MT)
- NFL draft: 1987: undrafted

Career history
- Chicago Bears (1987)*; Cincinnati Bengals (1987); New York Jets (1988)*
- * Offseason or practice squad member only
- Stats at Pro Football Reference

David Sherman Romasko (born November 3, 1963) is an American former professional football tight end who played for the Cincinnati Bengals of the National Football League (NFL). He played college football at University of Idaho and Carroll College. He was also a member of the New York Jets.
