= Jeff Smith (defensive end) =

American football player (born 1963)

No. 76
- Position: Defensive end

Personal information
- Born: April 4, 1962 (age 64); Spring Valley, Tennessee, U.S.
- Listed height: 6 ft 4 in (1.93 m)
- Listed weight: 248 lb (112 kg)

Career information
- High school: Tiskilwa
- College: Air Force
- NFL draft: 1986: undrafted

Career history
- Philadelphia Eagles (1986)*; Cincinnati Bengals (1987)
- * Offseason or practice squad member only
- Stats at Pro Football Reference

Jeffrey A. Smith (born May 4, 1962) is an American former professional football player who was a defensive end for the Cincinnati Bengals in the National Football League (NFL). He played college football for the Air Force Falcons.
