= Dave Walter =

American football player (born 1964)

No. 11
- Position: Quarterback

Personal information
- Born: January 11, 1964 (age 62); West Branch, Michigan, U.S.
- Listed height: 6 ft 3 in (1.91 m)
- Listed weight: 230 lb (104 kg)

Career information
- High school: Meridian (Sanford, Michigan)
- College: Michigan Tech
- NFL draft: 1987: 11th round, 307th overall pick

Career history
- New York Giants (1987)*; Cincinnati Bengals (1987); Green Bay Packers (1988)*
- * Offseason or practice squad member only

Career NFL statistics
- Passing attempts: 21
- Passing completions: 10
- Completion percentage: 47.6%
- TD–INT: 0–0
- Passing yards: 113
- Passer rating: 64.2
- Stats at Pro Football Reference

David Lee Russell Walter (born December 9, 1964) is an American former professional football player who was a quarterback in the National Football League (NFL). The New York Giants selected him in the 11th round of the 1987 NFL draft with the 307th overall pick. He played for the Cincinnati Bengals. He played college football for the Michigan Tech Huskies. Walter has three children, David, Jessica, and Rebekah.
