= Sam Wyche =

American football player and coach (1945–2020)

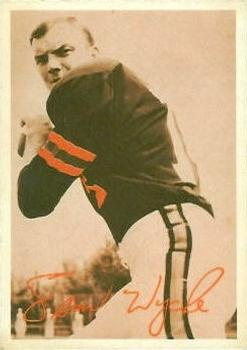
- Wyche with the Cincinnati Bengals in 1969

No. 14, 18, 17, 15
- Position: Quarterback

Personal information
- Born: January 5, 1945; Atlanta, Georgia, U.S.
- Died: January 2, 2020 (aged 74); Pickens, South Carolina, U.S.
- Listed height: 6 ft 4 in (1.93 m)
- Listed weight: 218 lb (99 kg)

Career information
- High school: North Fulton (Atlanta)
- College: Furman
- NFL draft: 1968: undrafted

Career history

Playing
- Wheeling Ironmen (1966–1967); Cincinnati Bengals (1968–1970); Washington Redskins (1971–1973); Detroit Lions (1974); St. Louis Cardinals (1976); Buffalo Bills (1976)

Coaching
- South Carolina (1967) Assistant coach; San Francisco 49ers (1979–1982) Quarterbacks coach; Indiana (1983) Head coach; Cincinnati Bengals (1984–1991) Head coach; Tampa Bay Buccaneers (1992–1995) Head coach; Pickens HS (2002–2003) Quarterbacks coach; Buffalo Bills (2004–2005) Quarterbacks coach; Pickens HS (2006–2008) Quarterbacks coach; Pickens HS (2011–2019) Offensive coordinator

Awards and highlights
- As a coach: Cincinnati Bengals 50th Anniversary Team

Career NFL/AFL statistics
- Passing attempts: 222
- Passing completions: 116
- Completion percentage: 52.3%
- TD–INT: 12–9
- Passing yards: 1,748
- Passer rating: 79.6
- Stats at Pro Football Reference

Head coaching record
- Regular season: 84–107 (.440) (NFL); 3–8 (.273) (college)
- Postseason: 3–2 (.600)
- Career: 87–109 (.444) (NFL); 3–8 (.273) (college)
- Coaching profile at Pro Football Reference

Samuel David Wyche (/waɪtʃ/; January 5, 1945 – January 2, 2020) was an American professional football quarterback and coach. He was a quarterback and head coach for the Cincinnati Bengals and a quarterbacks coach for the San Francisco 49ers. As head coach, he led the Bengals to Super Bowl XXIII, which they lost to the 49ers 20–16, relinquishing the lead on a last-minute touchdown. He was also known for introducing the use of the no-huddle offense as a standard offense (as opposed to use at the end of the half).

Wyche coached Cincinnati from 1984 to 1991, and his 64 wins with the Bengals were the most by a coach in franchise history until he was surpassed by Marvin Lewis in 2011.

Wyche also played for the Washington Redskins, Detroit Lions, St. Louis Cardinals, and Buffalo Bills. He also coached at the University of South Carolina and Indiana University, and for the San Francisco 49ers, Tampa Bay Buccaneers, and Buffalo Bills.

== College career ==
From 1963 to 1965, Wyche played college football at Furman University as a quarterback. He was also an initiated member of Kappa Alpha Order fraternity. He earned his Bachelor of Arts degree from Furman University and his Master of Business Administration degree from the University of South Carolina.

== Professional career ==
=== Wheeling Ironmen ===
From 1966 through 1967, Wyche played for the Wheeling Ironmen of the semi-professional Continental Football League.

=== Cincinnati Bengals ===
Wyche signed with the American Football League expansion Cincinnati Bengals for the 1968 season, when he started three games and also served as backup to John Stofa and Dewey Warren. In his rookie season, he completed 35 passes in 55 attempts (63.6 percent) for 494 yards and two touchdowns. He also rushed 12 times for 74 yards (a 6.2 average) and caught one pass for five yards.

In Wyche's second season, 1969, he played in seven games, again starting three, as Bengals rookie Greg Cook eventually assumed the starting role. For the season, Wyche completed 54 passes in 108 attempts (50.0 percent) for 838 yards and seven touchdowns. He rushed 12 times for 109 yards (an 8.9 average) and one touchdown.

Wyche continued to play for the Bengals as they entered the National Football League in 1970 as part of the NFL–AFL merger. He played in all 14 games, once again starting three, with 26 completions in 57 attempts (45.6 percent) for 411 yards and three touchdowns. He rushed 19 times for 118 yards (a 6.2 average) with two touchdowns.

=== Washington Redskins ===
From 1971 to 1973, Wyche played for the Washington Redskins, who appeared in Super Bowl VII. Although playing in eight games during those two seasons, he did not attempt a pass. He primarily played as the team's holder on field goals.

=== Detroit Lions ===
In 1974, Wyche played for the Detroit Lions, with only one pass attempted. He was also selected in the inaugural World Football League draft in 1974.

=== St. Louis Cardinals ===
In the 1976, Wyche signed with the St. Louis Cardinals. He completed his only pass completion for five yards. He was waived on September 24, 1976.

=== Buffalo Bills ===
Wyche was signed by the Buffalo Bills on October 27, 1976. He did not play any games during his time with the team.

== Coaching career ==
=== University of South Carolina ===
In 1967, while at the University of South Carolina working on his MBA degree, Wyche was an assistant coach for the Gamecocks.

=== San Francisco 49ers ===
Wyche was an assistant coach and directed the passing game for the San Francisco 49ers from 1979 to 1982. He was on the coaching staff of the 1981 team that won Super Bowl XVI.

=== Indiana University ===
In 1983, Wyche was the head coach of the Indiana University Hoosiers, who finished 3–8. Future NFL head coach Cam Cameron was a quarterback on that team.

=== Cincinnati Bengals ===
Wyche was hired as the head coach of the Cincinnati Bengals in late December 1983. In his first three seasons, Cincinnati finished second each time, then fell to 4–11 in 1987. The next year, he led the Bengals to their second Super Bowl appearance, where they lost 20–16 to the San Francisco 49ers, who rallied to win with a touchdown pass from Joe Montana with 34 seconds remaining.

Wyche was known as the "Always Innovative Sam Wyche" by Norman Chad, as well as the nickname, "Wicky Wacky Wyche" for his unconventional play-calling. Wyche introduced the concept of having 12 or more players huddle on the field, then having a few leave the field. He called it the "sugar huddle"; it was meant to confuse the defense as to the personnel grouping. If defenses tried to adapt with their own substitutions, the Bengals snapped the ball, often leading to the defense being penalized for having too many players on the field. The NFL responded by changing the rules so that defenses could match the offensive substitutions before a snap was allowed. His Bengals were also the first to use the no-huddle/hurry-up offense as a base offense.

On December 10, 1989, during a game versus the Seattle Seahawks, Bengals fans began to throw snowballs onto the field in protest of what they believed to be a bad call by the officials. The Seahawks, who were at their own 4-yard line and an easy target from the bleachers, refused to continue until the snowball-throwing stopped, and play was halted by the officials. In order to stop the onslaught, Wyche was given a house microphone to try to calm the crowd. Wyche chided the fans who were doing the throwing, and alluded to the reputation of their in-state rivals, the Cleveland Browns:

Will the next person that sees anybody throw anything onto this field, point 'em out, and get 'em out of here. You don't live in Cleveland, you live in Cincinnati!

After the Bengals lost that game he refused to allow the media into the locker room, a violation of NFL policy for which he was fined $3,000, an increase from a 1986 fine he was assessed for pushing a microphone out of a reporter's hand. A year after the Seahawks game, he refused to allow a female reporter from USA Today in the locker room after a game, saying he did not want his players to be naked in front of her. The NFL fined him $27,000, the largest fine ever assessed against a coach. He complained that Commissioner Paul Tagliabue was more interested in fining him than finding a solution that worked.

During his Cincinnati tenure, Wyche also had an acrimonious relationship with Jerry Glanville, the head coach of the division rival Houston Oilers, whom he called a "phony"; the teams played each other twice each season. In one contest, after the Bengals had scored to extend their lead over the Oilers to 45–0, Wyche ordered his team to make an onside kick, potentially allowing them to retain possession, a move teams usually make only when the score is close late in the game. After defeating the Oilers 61–7 in 1989, Wyche waved derisively at Glanville as the teams left the field.

On December 24, 1991, just three years after the Bengals' Super Bowl appearance, Wyche was fired by owner Mike Brown, who had taken over the team upon the death of his father, club founder Paul Brown, four months earlier. Controversy erupted when the Bengals claimed Wyche had resigned, relieving the team of any future payments, but Wyche stated he was fired. His 61–66 record was the best of any Bengals' coach until 2011.

=== Tampa Bay Buccaneers ===
Wyche was hired by the Tampa Bay Buccaneers as head coach in 1992. He spent the next four years as head coach of the Buccaneers, where he drafted Derrick Brooks, Warren Sapp, and John Lynch, players who would be key members of the successful Buccaneers teams under his successors, Tony Dungy and Jon Gruden. Wyche was dismissed at the conclusion of the 1995 season, having accumulated a 23–41 record over four straight losing seasons.

Near the end of his tenure with the Buccaneers, Wyche participated in a lighthearted pregame promotional piece for NFL Films. At the time, Jimmy Johnson, then the recently dismissed coach of the Dallas Cowboys, was rumored to be heading to Tampa Bay to displace Wyche. During the promo, Wyche was about to address his team when personnel assistant John Idzik ducked his head into the room. He beckoned Wyche out of the room, and instructed him to "bring your playbook." Wyche disappeared, and in walked Johnson wearing a Buccaneers jacket, who then addressed "his" new team, to everyone's surprise.

=== Buffalo Bills ===
From 2004 to 2005, Wyche was the quarterbacks coach for the Buffalo Bills.

=== High school ===
In 2002, 2003 and from 2006 to 2010, Wyche volunteered as the offensive coordinator and quarterback coach for the Pickens High School Blue Flame in Pickens, South Carolina. He helped the Blue Flame get to the second round of the playoffs in 2006. Wyche was a registered substitute teacher in Pickens County schools.

== Head coaching record ==
=== College ===
| Year | Team | Overall | Conference | Standing | Bowl/playoffs |
|---|---|---|---|---|---|
Indiana Hoosiers (Big Ten Conference) (1983)
| 1983 | Indiana | 3–8 | 2–7 | T–8th | |
| Indiana: | | 3–8 | 2–7 | | |
| Total: | | 3–8 | | | |

=== NFL ===
| Team | Year | Regular season | | | | | Postseason | | | |
| Team | Year | Won | Lost | Ties | Win % | Finish | Won | Lost | Win % | Result |
|---|---|---|---|---|---|---|---|---|---|---|
| CIN | 1984 | 8 | 8 | 0 | .500 | 2nd in AFC Central | - | - | - | - |
| CIN | 1985 | 7 | 9 | 0 | .438 | 2nd in AFC Central | - | - | - | - |
| CIN | 1986 | 10 | 6 | 0 | .625 | 2nd in AFC Central | - | - | - | - |
| CIN | 1987 | 4 | 11 | 0 | .267 | 4th in AFC Central | - | - | - | - |
| CIN | 1988 | 12 | 4 | 0 | .750 | 1st in AFC Central | 2 | 1 | .667 | Lost to San Francisco 49ers in Super Bowl XXIII |
| CIN | 1989 | 8 | 8 | 0 | .500 | 4th in AFC Central | - | - | - | - |
| CIN | 1990 | 9 | 7 | 0 | .688 | 1st in AFC Central | 1 | 1 | .500 | Lost to Los Angeles Raiders in AFC Divisional Round |
| CIN | 1991 | 3 | 13 | 0 | .188 | 4th in AFC Central | - | - | - | - |
| CIN Total | | 61 | 66 | 0 | .480 | | 3 | 2 | .600 | |
| TB | 1992 | 5 | 11 | 0 | .313 | 3rd in NFC Central | - | - | - | - |
| TB | 1993 | 5 | 11 | 0 | .313 | 5th in NFC Central | - | - | - | - |
| TB | 1994 | 6 | 10 | 0 | .375 | 5th in NFC Central | - | - | - | - |
| TB | 1995 | 7 | 9 | 0 | .438 | 5th in NFC Central | - | - | - | - |
| TB Total | | 23 | 41 | 0 | .359 | | | | | |
| Total | | 84 | 107 | 0 | .440 | | 3 | 2 | .600 | |

== Broadcasting career ==
In 1996, Wyche worked as a sports analyst with Marv Albert on a weekly NFL game for NBC. In 1997, he was promoted to the studio on NBC's weekly pre-game and half-time shows. He worked as an analyst for CBS with Kevin Harlan on the weekly NFL games from 1998 until week 2 in 2000 when his voice gave part way through a game between Miami and Minnesota. Beesley Reece came up from sideline reporting to do color commentary for the rest of that game. He returned to CBS in 2001, where he did the first two games of the NFL season with Gus Johnson, and Brent Jones. In 2006, he was a commentator on Westwood One's NFL Thursday night coverage, with Dick Enberg. Also in 2006, he began working with Tom Werme broadcasting Southern Conference Football for Fox Sports South.

== Personal life ==
Wyche and his wife, Jane, had two children, Zak and Kerry, and six grandchildren. He was a private pilot for many years. He also enjoyed golf, tennis, jogging and riding his Harley-Davidson motorcycle.

Wyche opened a chain of sporting goods stores called Sam Wyche Sports World with a $40,000 bonus he earned as a player in Super Bowl VII with the Washington Redskins. The first store opened in 1973 and grew to over a dozen locations by the late 1980s. By 1990, the company was struggling financially and two years later was working on a deal to be bought out by Hibbett Sports. Ultimately, the deal did not come to fruition and the stores permanently closed.

Wyche underwent a biopsy on lymph nodes in his chest in 2000. His left Recurrent Laryngeal Nerve was severed during the procedure, leaving his voice consistently hoarse and scratchy. From 2004 to 2006, he was a volunteer at Pickens High School in South Carolina as a public speaker. He was an amateur magician.

Wyche's brother, Bubba, was a quarterback at Tennessee and in the Canadian Football League (CFL) and World Football League (WFL).

On September 9, 2016, Wyche was admitted to the Carolinas Medical Center's Dickson Heart Unit in Charlotte, North Carolina, awaiting a heart transplant due to congestive heart failure. Three days later, a heart was found, and on September 13, Wyche underwent a 4.5-hour transplant operation.

Wyche was diagnosed with melanoma in 2019 and died at his home in Pickens, South Carolina, on January 2, 2020, at the age of 74.

== Political career ==
On November 4, 2008, Wyche secured a seat on the County Council for Pickens County, South Carolina. Running as a member of the Republican Party, Wyche defeated Democrat Wesley Burbage for the Pickens seat, by a margin of 6,478 votes to 1,639.

== See also ==
- List of American Football League players
- List of Furman University people
