= Lance Sellers =

American football player (born 1963)

No. 55
- Position: Linebacker

Personal information
- Born: February 24, 1963 (age 63); Seattle, Washington, U.S.
- Listed height: 6 ft 1 in (1.85 m)
- Listed weight: 230 lb (104 kg)

Career information
- High school: Twin Falls (ID)
- College: Boise State
- NFL draft: 1987: 6th round, 155th overall pick

Career history
- Miami Dolphins (1987)*; Cincinnati Bengals (1987)
- * Offseason or practice squad member only
- Stats at Pro Football Reference

Lance Sellers (born February 24, 1963) is an American former professional football linebacker. He played for the Cincinnati Bengals in 1987. He was selected by the Miami Dolphins in the sixth round of the 1987 NFL draft.
