= Billy Poe =

American football player (born 1964)

No. 61, 67
- Position: Guard

Personal information
- Born: April 26, 1964 (age 62); Ironton, Ohio, U.S.
- Listed height: 6 ft 3 in (1.91 m)
- Listed weight: 280 lb (127 kg)

Career information
- High school: Rock Hill (Ironton)
- College: Morehead State
- NFL draft: 1987: undrafted

Career history
- Tampa Bay Buccaneers (1987)*; Cincinnati Bengals (1987); Chicago Bruisers (1988); Columbus Thunderbolts (1991); Frankfurt Galaxy (1991-1992)
- * Offseason or practice squad member only

Career NFL statistics
- Games played: 3
- Games started: 3
- Stats at Pro Football Reference
- Stats at ArenaFan.com

Billy Gene Poe II (born April 26, 1964) is an American former professional football player who was an offensive lineman for the Cincinnati Bengals of the National Football League (NFL) in 1987. He later played for several teams in the Arena Football League (AFL) and NFL Europe. A four-year letterman playing college football for the Morehead State Eagles from 1983 to 1986, Poe was induced to the Morehead State Hall of Fame in 1998.
