= Dana Wright (American football) =

American football player (born 1963)

No. 49
- Position: Running back

Personal information
- Born: June 2, 1963 (age 63); Ravenna, Ohio, U.S.
- Listed height: 6 ft 1 in (1.85 m)
- Listed weight: 219 lb (99 kg)

Career information
- High school: Theodore Roosevelt (Kent, Ohio)
- College: Kent State; Findlay
- NFL draft: 1987: 9th round, 251st overall pick

Career history
- New York Giants (1987)*; Cincinnati Bengals (1987)
- * Offseason or practice squad member only

Career NFL statistics
- Rushing yards: 74
- Rushing average: 3.1
- Receptions: 4
- Receiving yards: 28
- Stats at Pro Football Reference

Dana Jerome Wright (born June 2, 1963) is an American former professional football player who was a running back for the Cincinnati Bengals of the National Football League (NFL). He played college football for the Kent State Golden Flashes and Findlay Oilers.
