= Rodney Tweet =

American football player (born 1964)

No. 84
- Position: Wide receiver

Personal information
- Born: February 20, 1964 (age 62); Madison, South Dakota, U.S.
- Listed height: 6 ft 1 in (1.85 m)
- Listed weight: 195 lb (88 kg)

Career information
- High school: Austin (Austin, Minnesota)
- College: South Dakota
- NFL draft: 1986: undrafted

Career history
- Atlanta Falcons (1986)*; Cincinnati Bengals (1987)
- * Offseason or practice squad member only

Career NFL statistics
- Games played: 2
- Stats at Pro Football Reference

Rodney Lee Tweet (born February 20, 1964) is an American former professional football player who was a wide receiver for the Cincinnati Bengals of the National Football League (NFL). He played college football for the South Dakota Coyotes.
