= Bob Riley (offensive lineman) =

American football player (born 1964)

No. 66
- Position: Tackle

Personal information
- Born: June 23, 1964 (age 62); Pittsburgh, Pennsylvania, U.S.
- Listed height: 6 ft 5 in (1.96 m)
- Listed weight: 276 lb (125 kg)

Career information
- High school: North Allegheny
- College: Indiana
- NFL draft: 1987: 10th round, 276th overall pick

Career history
- Minnesota Vikings (1987)*; Cincinnati Bengals (1987); San Francisco 49ers (1988)*; Atlanta Falcons (1988–1989)*
- * Offseason or practice squad member only
- Stats at Pro Football Reference

Robert Harry Riley III (born June 23, 1964) is an American former professional football tackle who played for the Cincinnati Bengals of the National Football League (NFL). He played college football at Indiana University.

Riley attended North Allegheny High School where he was an all-state football player and the number-one ranked Western Pennsylvania Interscholastic Athletic League wrestler. During his NFL career, he was a member of the Minnesota Vikings, Bengals, San Francisco 49ers and Atlanta Falcons.
