= Keith Cupp =

American football player (born 1964)

No. 72
- Position: Offensive tackle

Personal information
- Born: June 20, 1964 (age 62); Lima, Ohio, U.S.
- Listed height: 6 ft 6 in (1.98 m)
- Listed weight: 301 lb (137 kg)

Career information
- High school: Leipsic (Leipsic, Ohio)
- College: Findlay
- NFL draft: 1986: undrafted

Career history
- Cincinnati Bengals (1986–1987); Kansas City Chiefs (1988)*; Green Bay Packers (1989)
- * Offseason or practice squad member only

Career NFL statistics
- Games played: 3
- Games started: 3
- Stats at Pro Football Reference

Keith Eric Cupp (born June 20, 1964) is an American former professional football player who was a tackle for the Cincinnati Bengals of the National Football League (NFL). He played college football for the Findlay Oilers.
