= Ken Brown (wide receiver) =

American football player (born 1965)

No. 86
- Position: Wide receiver

Personal information
- Born: March 10, 1965 (age 61); Monroe, Louisiana, U.S.
- Listed height: 5 ft 8 in (1.73 m)
- Listed weight: 175 lb (79 kg)

Career information
- High school: Pine Bluff (Pine Bluff, Arkansas)
- College: Southern Arkansas (1983–1986)
- NFL draft: 1987: undrafted

Career history
- New England Patriots (1987)*; Cincinnati Bengals (1987); Atlanta Falcons (1988)*
- * Offseason or practice squad member only

Awards and highlights
- First-team All-American (1986)
- Stats at Pro Football Reference

Kenneth Bernard Brown (born March 10, 1965) is an American former professional football wide receiver who played one season with the Cincinnati Bengals of the National Football League (NFL). He played college football at Southern Arkansas University.

== Early life ==
Kenneth Bernard Brown was born on March 10, 1965, in Monroe, Louisiana. He attended Pine Bluff High School in Pine Bluff, Arkansas.

== College career ==
Brown played college football for the Southern Arkansas Muleriders of Southern Arkansas University from 1983 to 1986. He earned National Association of Intercollegiate Athletics (NAIA) All-District 17 and All-Arkansas Intercollegiate Conference (AIC) honors each year from 1984 to 1986. He was also an All-AIC selection as a punt returner in 1985. Brown garnered NAIA honorable mention All-American honors in 1984 and NAIA first-team All-American honors in 1986. He recorded career totals of 142 receptions and 20 receiving touchdowns. In 1986, he set school records for catches in a season with 75 and catches in a game with 14. Brown also had a school record 54 career kick returns. He was inducted into the Southern Arkansas University Athletics Hall of Fame in 2009.

== Professional career ==
Brown signed with the New England Patriots on May 11, 1987. He was released on August 25, 1987.

Brown was signed by the Cincinnati Bengals on September 23, 1987. He played in three games, all starts, for the Bengals in 1987, returning three kicks for 45 yards and five punts for 16 yards. He was released on October 19, 1987.

Brown signed with the Atlanta Falcons on February 21, 1988. He was released by the Falcons on July 19, 1988.

== Personal life ==
Brown later worked for DHL Packaging.
