= Greg Horne =

American football player (born 1964)

No. 10, 11, 4, 12
- Position: Punter

Personal information
- Born: November 22, 1964 (age 61); Russellville, Arkansas, U.S.
- Listed height: 6 ft 0 in (1.83 m)
- Listed weight: 188 lb (85 kg)

Career information
- High school: Russellville
- College: Arkansas
- NFL draft: 1987: 5th round, 139th overall pick

Career history
- Cincinnati Bengals (1987); St. Louis/Phoenix Cardinals (1987–1988); Washington Redskins (1989)*; San Francisco 49ers (1990)*; London Monarchs (1991); Montreal Machine (1992)
- * Offseason or practice squad member only

Awards and highlights
- First-team All-American (1986); First-team All-SWC (1986)

Career NFL statistics
- Punts: 122
- Punt yards: 4,958
- Punting yard average: 40.6
- Stats at Pro Football Reference

Gregory Lee Horne (born November 22, 1964) is an American former professional football player who was a punter in the National Football League (NFL). He played college football for the Arkansas Razorbacks. He was selected by the Cincinnati Bengals in the fifth round of the 1987 NFL draft.

Horne was a punter for two seasons in the NFL, first with the Cincinnati Bengals (1987) and with the Cardinals in St. Louis (1987) and then in Phoenix (1988). His career punting average was 40.6 yards in 122 punts.

He was the London Monarchs' punter in 1991, winning the first World Bowl. He played for Montreal Machine in 1992.

Horne led the NCAA in punting in 1986 averaging 47.2 yards per punt for Arkansas Razorbacks. He was the Razorbacks punter from 1983 to 1986 and kicker from 1983 to 1985. For his college career he punted 180 times for a 44.4 yard average. He still holds the Southwest Conference and Arkansas school record for highest punting average in a season (47.2 in 1986).
