= Aaron Manning =

American football player (born 1961)

No. 44
- Position: Defensive back

Personal information
- Born: August 26, 1961 (age 65); Jersey City, New Jersey, U.S.
- Listed height: 5 ft 11 in (1.80 m)
- Listed weight: 178 lb (81 kg)

Career information
- High school: Ferris (Jersey City)
- College: Iowa State
- NFL draft: 1987: undrafted

Career history
- Green Bay Packers (1987)*; Cincinnati Bengals (1987)
- * Offseason or practice squad member only

Career NFL statistics
- Games played: 3
- Stats at Pro Football Reference

Aaron K. Manning (born August 26, 1961) is an American former professional football player who was a defensive back for the Cincinnati Bengals of the National Football League (NFL) as a replacement player for three games during the 1987 strike. He played college football for the Iowa State Cyclones.
