= Robert Niehoff (American football) =

American football player (born 1964)

No. 42
- Position: Safety

Personal information
- Born: May 9, 1964 (age 62); Cincinnati, Ohio, U.S.
- Listed height: 6 ft 2 in (1.88 m)
- Listed weight: 205 lb (93 kg)

Career information
- High school: Roger Bacon (St. Bernard, Ohio)
- College: Cincinnati
- NFL draft: 1987: undrafted

Career history
- Cincinnati Bengals (1987)

Career NFL statistics
- Interceptions: 1
- Stats at Pro Football Reference

Robert Thomas Niehoff (born May 9, 1964) is an American former professional football player who was a defensive back for the Cincinnati Bengals of the National Football League (NFL). He played college football for the Cincinnati Bearcats.
