= Ken Smith (offensive guard) =

American football player (born 1960)

No. 62
- Position: Offensive guard

Personal information
- Born: October 16, 1960 (age 66); Indianapolis, Indiana, U.S.
- Listed height: 6 ft 2 in (1.88 m)
- Listed weight: 285 lb (129 kg)

Career information
- High school: North Central (Indianapolis)
- College: Miami (OH)
- NFL draft: 1983: undrafted

Career history
- Memphis Showboats (1984–1985); Cincinnati Bengals (1987)
- Stats at Pro Football Reference

Kenneth James Smith (born October 16, 1960) is an American former professional football player who was a offensive guard for the Cincinnati Bengals in the National Football League (NFL). He played college football for the Miami RedHawks.
