= Toney Catchings =

American football player (born 1965)

No. 56, 73, 95
- Position: Linebacker

Personal information
- Born: August 11, 1965 (age 61); Jackson, Mississippi, U.S.
- Listed height: 6 ft 3 in (1.91 m)
- Listed weight: 236 lb (107 kg)

Career information
- High school: Crystal Springs
- College: Cincinnati
- NFL draft: 1987: undrafted

Career history
- New York Giants (1987)*; Cincinnati Bengals (1987); Hamilton Tiger-Cats (1988); Cincinnati Rockers (1992); Cleveland Thunderbolts (1993–1994); Iowa Barnstormers (1995–2000); Los Angeles Avengers (2001)
- * Offseason or practice squad member only

Career NFL statistics
- Sacks: 2.5
- Fumble recoveries: 1
- Stats at Pro Football Reference

Toney Bruce Catchings (born August 11, 1965) is an American former professional football player who was a linebacker for the Cincinnati Bengals of the National Football League (NFL). He played college football for the Cincinnati Bearcats.
