= Doug Gaynor =

American football player (born 1963)

No. 11
- Position: Quarterback

Personal information
- Born: July 5, 1963 (age 63); Fresno, California, U.S.
- Listed height: 6 ft 2 in (1.88 m)
- Listed weight: 205 lb (93 kg)

Career information
- High school: Roosevelt (Fresno)
- College: Long Beach State
- NFL draft: 1986: 4th round, 99th overall pick

Career history
- Cincinnati Bengals (1986); Los Angeles Rams (1988)*
- * Offseason or practice squad member only

Career NFL statistics
- TD-INT: 0–0
- Passing yards: 30
- Passer rating: 108.3
- Stats at Pro Football Reference

Doug Gaynor (July 5, 1963) is an American former professional football player who was a quarterback for the Cincinnati Bengals of the National Football League (NFL). He played college football for the Long Beach State 49ers and was selected in the fourth round of the 1986 NFL draft.

== College career ==
Gaynor played college football for the Long Beach State 49ers. Gaynor started for the 49ers in 1984 and 1985. In his two seasons, Gaynor threw for 6,793 yards while throwing 35 touchdowns and 35 interceptions. In 1985, Gaynor was named Pacific Coast Athletic Association Co-Offensive Player of the Year.

== Professional career ==
Gaynor was drafted by the Cincinnati Bengals with the 99th pick in the fourth round of the 1986 NFL draft. In his rookie year, Gaynor was the team's third-string quarterback and had three pass attempts.
