= Skip McClendon =

American football player (born 1964)

No. 72, 98, 96, 95
- Position: Defensive end

Personal information
- Born: April 9, 1964 (age 62); Detroit, Michigan, U.S.
- Listed height: 6 ft 6 in (1.98 m)
- Listed weight: 270 lb (122 kg)

Career information
- High school: Redford (Detroit, Michigan)
- College: Northwestern; Arizona State
- NFL draft: 1987: 3rd round, 77th overall pick

Career history
- Cincinnati Bengals (1987–1991); San Diego Chargers (1991); Minnesota Vikings (1992); Indianapolis Colts (1992-1993); Orlando Predators (1995–1997); Iowa Barnstormers (1999)

Awards and highlights
- First-team All-Pac-10 (1986)

Career NFL statistics
- Sacks: 8
- Fumble recoveries: 3
- Stats at Pro Football Reference

Kenneth Christopher "Skip" McClendon (born April 9, 1964) is an American former professional football player who played defensive end for seven seasons for the Cincinnati Bengals, San Diego Chargers, Minnesota Vikings, and Indianapolis Colts.

Pre-draft measurables
Height	Weight	Arm length	Hand span	40-yard dash	10-yard split	20-yard split	20-yard shuttle	Vertical jump	Broad jump	Bench press
6 ft 5 in (1.96 m)	266 lb (121 kg)	33 1/4 in (0.84 m)	9 in (0.23 m)	5.12 s	1.73 s	2.95 s	4.52 s	28.0 in (0.71 m)	9 ft 4 in (2.84 m)	12 reps
All values from NFL Combine

He was selected by the Bengals in the third round of the 1987 NFL draft with the 77th overall pick.
