= Pat Franklin =

American football player (born 1968)

No. 35, 39
- Position: Fullback

Personal information
- Born: August 16, 1963 (age 63); Bay City, Texas, U.S.
- Listed height: 6 ft 1 in (1.85 m)
- Listed weight: 232 lb (105 kg)

Career information
- High school: Bay City
- College: Southwest Texas State
- NFL draft: 1986: 7th round, 177th overall pick

Career history
- Cincinnati Bengals (1986)*; Tampa Bay Buccaneers (1986); Indianapolis Colts (1987)*; Cincinnati Bengals (1987); San Diego Chargers (1988)*
- * Offseason or practice squad member only
- Stats at Pro Football Reference

Patrick Dijon Franklin (born August 16, 1963) is an American former professional football fullback who played in the National Football League (NFL) with the Tampa Bay Buccaneers and Cincinnati Bengals. He played college football for the Houston Cougars and Southwest Texas State Bobcats, and was selected by the Bengals in the seventh round of the 1986 NFL draft.

== Early life ==
Patrick Dijon Franklin was born on August 16, 1963, in Bay City, Texas. He played high school football at Bay City High School, earning All-American honors and helping Bay City achieve a 36–3–1 record over three years. He was considered the best running back prospect in Texas in the class of 1981. Franklin also had an "outstanding" track career in high school.

== College career ==
Franklin enrolled at University of Houston to play college football for the Cougars. He mainly played for the junior varsity team as a freshman in 1981, leading the team in catches with eight for 124 yards as a tight end. He made his varsity debut in 1981 as a temporary placekicker. Franklin ended the 1981 varsity season with 10 carries for 33 yards and three kick returns for 50 yards. However, he did not play enough to earn a varsity letter. He was moved to fullback after spring practices in 1982. He hurt his shoulder before the start of the 1982 season and did not end up playing enough that year to earn a letter. In late October 1982, Franklin was declared academically ineligible, finishing the year with 13 rushes for 47 yards.

Franklin transferred to Southwest Texas State University, where he was a two-year letterman for the Bobcats from 1984 to 1985.

== Professional career ==
Franklin was selected by the Cincinnati Bengals in the seventh round, with the 177th overall pick, of the 1986 NFL draft. He signed with the team on July 24. He impressed with his speed during the preseason but also made some blocking mistakes. Franklin was released on September 1 before the start of the 1986 season.

Franklin signed with the Tampa Bay Buccaneers on October 21, 1986. He played in eight games, starting one, at fullback for the Buccaneers in 1986, totaling seven receptions for 29 yards and one touchdown on eight targets, seven carries for seven yards, and three kick returns for 23 yards. On November 2, 1986, in the first quarter of a game against the Buffalo Bills, Bills kick returner Ron Pitts fumbled a kickoff and Franklin recovered in the end zone for a Tampa Bay touchdown. The Buccaneers won 34–28. Franklin was waived on August 31, 1987, after the third game of the 1987 preseason.

Franklin was claimed off waivers by the Indianapolis Colts on September 1, 1987. He was released on September 7, 1987.

On September 25, 1987, a week into the 1987 NFL players strike, Franklin signed with the Bengals. He played in the remaining two strike games for Cincinnati in a reserve role and did not record any statistics. He was released on October 19, 1987, after the strike ended.

Franklin signed with the San Diego Chargers on May 23, 1988. He was released on August 22, 1988, after the third of four preseason games.
