= Tom Flaherty (American football) =

American football player (born 1964)

No. 52
- Position: Linebacker

Personal information
- Born: September 24, 1964 (age 62); Chicago, Illinois, U.S.
- Listed height: 6 ft 3 in (1.91 m)
- Listed weight: 223 lb (101 kg)

Career information
- High school: St. Rita of Cascia (Chicago)
- College: Northwestern
- NFL draft: 1986: 11th round, 294th overall pick

Career history
- Cincinnati Bengals (1986)*; Chicago Bears (1987)*; Cincinnati Bengals (1987)
- * Offseason or practice squad member only

Career NFL statistics
- Fumble recoveries: 1
- Stats at Pro Football Reference

Thomas Francis Flaherty (born September 24, 1964) is an American former professional football player who was a linebacker for three games with the Cincinnati Bengals of the National Football League (NFL) in 1987. He played college football for the Northwestern Wildcats.

Tom lives with his wife Christine and has four daughters. His daughter Vanessa ran Cross County at the University of Illinois Urbana-Champaign. His other daughter Tara rowed Crew at the University of Michigan. His nephew Steve Flaherty played football at Northwestern.
