= Jim Riggs (American football) =

American football player (born 1963)

No. 87, 82
- Position: Tight end

Personal information
- Born: September 29, 1963 (age 63); Fort Knox, Kentucky, U.S.
- Listed height: 6 ft 5 in (1.96 m)
- Listed weight: 245 lb (111 kg)

Career information
- High school: Scotland (Laurinburg, North Carolina)
- College: Clemson
- NFL draft: 1987: 4th round, 103rd overall pick

Career history
- Cincinnati Bengals (1987–1992); Washington Redskins (1993)

Awards and highlights
- Third-team All-American (1986); 2× First-team All-ACC (1985, 1986)

Career NFL statistics
- Receptions: 37
- Receiving yards: 274
- Stats at Pro Football Reference

James Thomas Riggs (born September 29, 1963) is an American former professional football player who was a tight end in the National Football League (NFL).

Riggs was born in Fort Knox, Kentucky and played scholastically at Scotland High School in Laurinburg, North Carolina. He played college football at Clemson University. As a senior, he was selected as a third-team All-American by Gannett News Service.

Pre-draft measurables
Height	Weight	Arm length	Hand span	40-yard dash	10-yard split	20-yard split	20-yard shuttle	Vertical jump	Broad jump	Bench press
6 ft 5 in (1.96 m)	245 lb (111 kg)	32 1/4 in (0.82 m)	10 in (0.25 m)	4.78 s	1.71 s	2.76 s	4.34 s	25.5 in (0.65 m)	8 ft 4 in (2.54 m)	18 reps
All values from NFL Combine

Riggs was selected by the Cincinnati in the fourth round of the 1987 NFL draft with the 103rd overall pick. He spent six seasons with the Bengals, appearing in all 16 games during the 1988, 1990, and 1991 seasons. He finished his career with the Washington Redskins.
