= Mike Martin (wide receiver) =

American football player (born 1960)

No. 88
- Position: Wide receiver

Personal information
- Born: November 18, 1960 (age 65); Washington D.C., U.S.
- Listed height: 5 ft 10 in (1.78 m)
- Listed weight: 186 lb (84 kg)

Career information
- High school: Eastern (Washington D.C.)
- College: Illinois
- NFL draft: 1983: 8th round, 221st overall pick

Career history
- Cincinnati Bengals (1983–1989)

Awards and highlights
- Third-team All-American (1982); First-team All-Big Ten (1982)

Career NFL statistics
- Receptions: 67
- Receiving yards: 1,017
- Receiving touchdowns: 6
- Return yards: 3,024
- Stats at Pro Football Reference

Mike Martin (born November 18, 1960) is an American former professional football player who was a wide receiver for seven seasons with the Cincinnati Bengals in the National Football League (NFL). He played college football for the Illinois Fighting Illini.

== Early life ==
Martin grew up in Washington, D.C., and attended Eastern High School.

== College career ==
Martin played football at the University of Illinois, where during his senior year he caught a record 77 receptions for 1,068 yards. In four years for the Fighting Illini, he caught 143 passes for 2,300 yards (a 16.1 average) with 15 touchdowns. He also returned punts and kicoffs.

As of the beginning of the Fighting Illini's 2022 season, Martin ranks fourth all-time in single-season receptions (77), ninth in career receptions (143), fifth in career receiving yardage (2,300), and tied for fourth in single-game receptions with 12 against Ohio State in 1982.

== NFL ==
Martin was chosen by the Bengals in the eighth round of the 1983 NFL draft. In his seven seasons, he caught 67 passes for 1,017 yards (a 15.1 average) with 6 receiving touchdowns, with his most productive receiving year 1987 with 20 receptions for 394 yards. He returned 140 punts for 1,381 yards (a 9.9 average), including a league-leading 15.7 yards per return in 1983. He also returned 75 kicks for 1,643 yards, a 21.9 average.

He was a member of the Bengals' team which went to the 1989 Super Bowl, won by the San Francisco 49ers, 20–16. Martin did not play, as his season ended with an injury in the season's 6th game. He had surgery to repair his left Achilles in 1988; the surgery resulted in his left calf being shorter than his right calf.

== Coaching ==
After his playing career ended, Martin operated several night clubs in the Cincinnati area. In 2002, Martin was named coach of Taft High School in Cincinnati, tapped to revive a program which had been disbanded due to lack of student participation. He coached the Senators for eight years, compiling a record of 44–28.

== Personal life ==
Martin met his wife, Michelle, at Illinois where she was cheerleader. They married in 1986. They currently live in Chicago, where his family including daughter Morgan owns several smoothie bars and a fitness facility.

Martin is vice president of the Marcus Martin Foundation, named for his late son, who died at from a pulmonary embolism at age 25 in 2014. The foundation provides financial support for college-bound high school students, conducts free youth football camps, and educates about the dangers of pulmonary embolism.
