= Leo Barker =

American football player (born 1959)

No. 53
- Position: Linebacker

Personal information
- Born: November 7, 1959 (age 66); Cristobal, Panama Canal Zone
- Listed height: 6 ft 1 in (1.85 m)
- Listed weight: 240 lb (109 kg)

Career information
- High school: Cristóbal (CZ)
- College: New Mexico State
- NFL draft: 1984: 7th round, 177th overall pick

Career history
- Cincinnati Bengals (1984–1991)

Career NFL statistics
- Sacks: 3
- Interceptions: 3
- Fumble recoveries: 2
- Stats at Pro Football Reference

Leonardo Barker (born November 7, 1959) is a Panamanian former professional football player who was the first person born in Panama to play in the National Football League (NFL). He played for the Cincinnati Bengals from 1984 until 1991. He played varsity football at Rainbow City/Cristobal in the Panama Canal Zone, then an unincorporated territory of the United States. From 2008 to 2010, he was the head coach of the Hornets of Roswell High School. He lives in Roswell, Georgia, with his family, teaches Spanish and linebacker coach for Blessed Trinity Catholic High School.

== College career ==
Barker was a member of the New Mexico State University Aggies football team from 1979 to 1983. He was a starting (linebacker) every year he played and was second on the team in tackles his junior and senior seasons. At New Mexico State, Barker racked up 378 career tackles; enough to place him number four on the all-time Aggie list. In 2003, Leo Barker was inducted into the New Mexico State University Intercollegiate Athletic Hall of Fame.

== Professional career ==
He was selected by the Cincinnati Bengals in the seventh round of the NFL draft in 1984. He played for the Bengals until 1992, when he retired. Barker was an integral part of the Bengals’ nickel-package defense. In 1989, Barker helped lead them to a league best 12–4 record and an appearance in Super Bowl XXIII.
