= Leon White (linebacker) =

American football player (born 1963)

No. 51, 55
- Position: Linebacker

Personal information
- Born: October 4, 1963 (age 63); San Diego, California, U.S.
- Listed height: 6 ft 3 in (1.91 m)
- Listed weight: 240 lb (109 kg)

Career information
- High school: Helix (La Mesa, California)
- College: BYU
- NFL draft: 1986: 5th round, 123rd overall pick

Career history
- Cincinnati Bengals (1986–1991); Los Angeles Rams (1992–1993)

Awards and highlights
- National champion (1984); Holiday Bowl Defensive MVP (1984)

Career NFL statistics
- Sacks: 6
- Interceptions: 4
- Fumble recoveries: 3
- Touchdowns: 1
- Stats at Pro Football Reference

Thomas Leon White (born October 4, 1963) is an American former professional football player who was a linebacker in the National Football League (NFL). He played college football for the BYU Cougars.

== Early life ==
White prepped at Helix High School in La Mesa, California. Helped Helix win two CIF San Diego section football championships. (1978,1980)

== College career ==
He played college football for four years at Brigham Young University and was on the unbeaten 1984 National Championship team. 1984 Holiday Bowl Defensive MVP.

== Professional career ==
White played eight seasons in the National Football League. He was drafted by the Cincinnati Bengals in the fifth round of the 1986 NFL Draft with the 123rd overall pick. He started at OLB for the Cincinnati Bengals in Super Bowl XXIII.
