= 1988–89 NFL playoffs =

American football tournament

- Dates: December 24, 1988 – January 22, 1989
- Season: 1988
- Teams: 10
- Games played: 9
- Super Bowl XXIII site: Joe Robbie Stadium; Miami, Florida
- Defending champions: Washington Redskins (did not qualify)
- Champion: San Francisco 49ers (3rd title)
- Runner-up: Cincinnati Bengals
- Conference runners-up: Buffalo Bills; Chicago Bears
NFL playoffs
← 1987–88	1989–90 →

The National Football League playoffs for the 1988 season began on December 24, 1988. The postseason tournament concluded with the San Francisco 49ers defeating the Cincinnati Bengals in Super Bowl XXIII, 20–16, on January 22, 1989, at Joe Robbie Stadium in Miami, Florida.

== Participants ==
Within each conference, the three division winners and the two non-division winners with the best overall regular season records qualified for the playoffs. The NFL did not use a fixed-bracket playoff system. The three division winners were seeded 1–3 based on their overall won-lost-tied record, and received a first-round bye while the wild card teams were seeded 4 and 5, and played in the first round, dubbed the wild-card playoffs or wild-card weekend, with the 4 seed hosting. The second round, the divisional playoffs, had a restriction where two teams from the same division could not meet: the surviving wild card team visited the division champion outside its division that had the higher seed, and the remaining two teams from that conference played each other. The two surviving teams from each conference's divisional playoff games then met in the respective AFC and NFC Conference Championship games, hosted by the higher seed. Finally the Super Bowl, the championship round of the playoffs, was played at a neutral site, with the designated home team based on an annual rotation by conference.

Playoff seeds
Seed	AFC	NFC
1	Cincinnati Bengals (Central winner)	Chicago Bears (Central winner)
2	Buffalo Bills (East winner)	San Francisco 49ers (West winner)
3	Seattle Seahawks (West winner)	Philadelphia Eagles (East winner)
4	Cleveland Browns (wild card)	Minnesota Vikings (wild card)
5	Houston Oilers (wild card)	Los Angeles Rams (wild card)

== Bracket ==
Note: The Cincinnati Bengals (the AFC 1 seed) did not play the Houston Oilers (the 5 seed), nor did the Chicago Bears (the NFC 1 seed) play the Minnesota Vikings (the 4 seed), in the Divisional playoff round because those teams were in the same division.

Jan 1 – Rich Stadium
5	Houston	10
Dec 24 – Cleveland Stadium	Jan 8 – Riverfront Stadium
2*	Buffalo	17
AFC
5	Houston	24	2	Buffalo	10
Dec 31 – Riverfront Stadium
4	Cleveland	23	1	Cincinnati	21
AFC Championship
3	Seattle	13
Jan 22 – Joe Robbie Stadium
1*	Cincinnati	21
Divisional round
Wild-card round	A1	Cincinnati	16
Jan 1 – Candlestick Park
N2	San Francisco	20
Super Bowl XXIII
4	Minnesota	9
Dec 26 – Hubert H. Humphrey Metrodome	Jan 8 – Soldier Field
2*	San Francisco	34
NFC
5	LA Rams	17	2	San Francisco	28
Dec 31 – Soldier Field
4	Minnesota	28	1	Chicago	3
NFC Championship
3	Philadelphia	12
1*	Chicago	20

== Schedule ==
Due to Christmas falling on a Sunday, the two wild card playoff games were held in a span of three days.

In the United States, CBS televised the NFC playoff games, while NBC broadcast the AFC games and Super Bowl XXIII.

Round	Away team	Score	Home team	Date	Kickoff (ET / UTC−5)	TV
Wild-card round	Houston Oilers	24–23	Cleveland Browns	December 24, 1988	1:30 p.m.	NBC
Wild-card round	Los Angeles Rams	17–28	Minnesota Vikings	December 26, 1988	2:30 p.m.	CBS
Divisional round	Philadelphia Eagles	12–20	Chicago Bears	December 31, 1988	12:30 p.m.	CBS
Divisional round	Seattle Seahawks	13–21	Cincinnati Bengals	December 31, 1988	4:00 p.m.	NBC
Divisional round	Houston Oilers	10–17	Buffalo Bills	January 1, 1989	12:30 p.m.	NBC
Divisional round	Minnesota Vikings	9–34	San Francisco 49ers	January 1, 1989	4:00 p.m.	CBS
Conference championships	Buffalo Bills	10–21	Cincinnati Bengals	January 8, 1989	12:30 p.m.	NBC
Conference championships	San Francisco 49ers	28–3	Chicago Bears	January 8, 1989	4:00 p.m.	CBS
Super Bowl XXIII Joe Robbie Stadium Miami, Florida	Cincinnati Bengals	16–20	San Francisco 49ers	January 22, 1989	5:00 p.m.	NBC

== Wild-card round ==
=== Saturday, December 24, 1988 ===
==== AFC: Houston Oilers 24, Cleveland Browns 23 ====
Houston Oilers vs. Cleveland Browns – Game summary

Quarter	1	2	3	4	Total
Oilers	0	14	0	10	24
Browns	3	6	7	7	23

at Cleveland Stadium, Cleveland, Ohio

- Game time: 1:30 p.m. EST
- Game attendance: 74,977
- Referee: Jerry Seeman
- TV announcers (NBC): Don Criqui (play-by-play) and Bob Trumpy (color commentator)

Game information

First quarter

- CLE – Matt Bahr 33-yard field goal. Browns 3–0.

Second quarter

- HOU – Allen Pinkett 14-yard pass from Warren Moon (Tony Zendejas kick). Oilers 7–3.
- HOU – Allen Pinkett 16-yard run (Tony Zendejas kick). Oilers 14–3.
- CLE – Matt Bahr 26-yard field goal. Oilers 14–6.
- CLE – Matt Bahr 28-yard field goal. Oilers 14–9.

Third quarter

- CLE – Webster Slaughter 14-yard pass from Mike Pagel (Matt Bahr kick). Browns 16–14.

Fourth quarter

- HOU – Lorenzo White 1-yard run (Tony Zendejas kick). Oilers 21–16.
- HOU – Tony Zendejas 49-yard field goal. Oilers 24–16.
- CLE – Webster Slaughter 2-yard pass from Mike Pagel (Matt Bahr kick). Oilers 24–23.

Top passers

- HOU – Warren Moon – 16/26, 213 yards, TD, 3 INT
- CLE – Mike Pagel – 17/25, 179 yards, 2 TD, INT

Top rushers

- HOU – Allen Pinkett – 14 rushes, 82 yards, TD
- CLE – Earnest Byner – 9 rushes, 57 yards

Top receivers

- HOU – Drew Hill – 5 receptions, 73 yards
- CLE – Webster Slaughter – 5 receptions, 58 yards, 2 TD

In a brutal game in which both teams combined for 22 penalties (13 for Houston, nine for Cleveland), including four personal fouls, Oilers cornerback Richard Johnson's interception set up kicker Tony Zendejas' game-clinching 49-yard field goal to give the Oilers a two-score lead with 1:54 left in the game. Houston won despite throwing three interceptions and losing their leading rusher Mike Rozier to injury after his first play of the game.

On the second play of the game, Felix Wright intercepted a pass from Warren Moon and returned it 13 yards to the Oilers 33-yard line to set up a 33-yard field goal by Matt Bahr. Houston responded with a 91-yard drive that consumed 9:44 and ended on Moon's 14-yard touchdown pass to running back Allen Pinkett. Then on the first play of Cleveland's next drive, Browns quarterback Don Strock, who was filling in for the injured Bernie Kosar and starting in a playoff game for the first time in his 16-season career, fumbled a snap and Oilers nose tackle Richard Byrd recovered the ball. Strock sprained his wrist while going after the ball on the play, and was replaced by third-string quarterback Mike Pagel. Meanwhile, Houston scored on their first play after the turnover with Pinkett's 16-yard touchdown run, making the score 14–3. They had a chance to score again near the end of the half, but Wright picked off Moon's pass in the end zone.

Pagel, now leading the Browns offense in what turned out to be the only playoff game he would play in his 11-season career, led the Browns back 71 yards on a drive that had four consecutive plays end with penalties (including a brawl between the teams) to score on Bahr's second field goal of the day. Bahr added one more field goal before the end of the half to cut the score to 14–9 at halftime.

In the third quarter, a controversial blown call occurred when Houston QB Warren Moon attempted a backward pass at his own 7 yard line. The pass ricocheted off the intended receiver and fell incomplete. Cleveland linebacker Clay Matthews recovered the assumed lateral at the Oilers' 5 yard line and went into the end zone for an apparent touchdown. Instant replay clearly showed that Moon's pass had traveled backwards and the Browns should have been either awarded a touchdown with Matthews' recovery and advance into the end zone, or given possession of the ball at the Oilers' 5 yard line. However, Houston was inexplicably granted possession of the ball at the 5 yard line, due to an inadvertent whistle stopping play, the very spot where referees agreed that Matthews had recovered the lateral for Cleveland. Later, Moon threw his third interception of the day, this one to Mark Harper, who returned it 17 yards with a facemask penalty against Alonzo Highsmith adding another 11. Cleveland took over on the Houston 11, and eventually scored on Pagel's 14-yard touchdown pass to Webster Slaughter that gave the Browns the lead, 16–14. However, the Oilers marched on a 76-yard drive in which Moon completed passes to Jamie Williams and Drew Hill for gains of 14 and 18 yards, while Pinkett had a 27-yard carry. Rookie running back Lorenzo White capped it off with a 1-yard touchdown run. After that, the Oilers stopped Cleveland on their next two drives, including Johnson's interception that set up Zendejas' 49-yard field goal, giving them a 24–16 lead with less than two minutes left in the game.

With no two-point conversion option (that would not be adopted by the league until 1994), Cleveland needed two scores to come back. Pagel led the Browns 71 yards to score on his 2-yard touchdown pass to Slaughter, cutting the score to 24–23 with 31 seconds left. Cleveland attempted an onside kick, which they failed to recover, but got another chance due to an Oilers penalty. Then the Browns recovered, but had to do it over again due to a penalty against them. Finally on the third try, Cleveland was penalized for touching the ball before it went 10 yards, resulting in a penalty that gave Houston the ball and the win.

Pagel completed 17 of 25 passes for 179 yards with two touchdowns and an interception. Wright had two interceptions.

This was the first postseason meeting between the Oilers and Browns.

=== Monday, December 26, 1988 ===
==== NFC: Minnesota Vikings 28, Los Angeles Rams 17 ====
Los Angeles Rams vs. Minnesota Vikings – Game summary

Quarter	1	2	3	4	Total
Rams	0	7	3	7	17
Vikings	14	0	7	7	28

at Hubert H. Humphrey Metrodome, Minneapolis, Minnesota

- Game time: 2:30 p.m. EST/1:30 p.m. CST
- Game attendance: 57,666
- Referee: Dick Hantak
- TV announcers (CBS): Pat Summerall (play-by-play) and John Madden (color commentator)

Game information

First quarter

- MIN – Alfred Anderson 7-yard run (Bani Nelson kick). Vikings 7–0.
- MIN – Allen Rice 17-yard run (Bani Nelson kick). Vikings 14–0.

Second quarter

- RAMS – Damone Johnson 3-yard pass from Jim Everett (Mike Lansford kick). Vikings 14–7.

Third quarter

- MIN – Alfred Anderson 1-yard run (Bani Nelson kick). Vikings 21–7.
- RAMS – Mike Lansford 33-yard field goal. Vikings 21–10.

Fourth quarter

- MIN – Carl Hilton 5-yard pass from Wade Wilson (Bani Nelson kick). Vikings 28–10.
- RAMS – Pete Holohan 11-yard pass from Jim Everett (Mike Lansford kick). Vikings 28–17.

Top passers

- RAMS – Jim Everett – 19/45, 247 yards, 2 TD, 3 INT
- MIN – Wade Wilson – 17/28, 253 yards, TD

Top rushers

- RAMS – Greg Bell – 17 rushes, 91 yards
- MIN – Allen Rice – 17 rushes, 79 yards, TD

Top receivers

- RAMS – Henry Ellard – 4 receptions, 54 yards
- MIN – Anthony Carter – 4 receptions, 102 yards

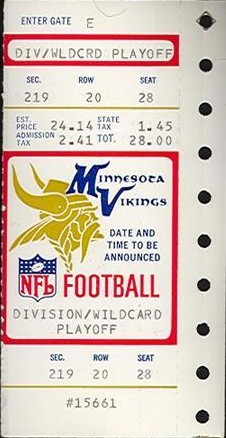
A ticket for the NFC Wild Card Game between the Vikings and the Rams

Vikings safety Joey Browner recorded two interceptions in the first quarter to set up a two-touchdown lead that the Rams could never recover from. Browner also finished the game with seven tackles, had the Vikings' only sack of the day, and recovered a Rams onside kick attempt to seal the win.

Browner's first interception, on third and 17 from the Vikings 32, led to a 73-yard drive by Minnesota that featured Wade Wilson's 34-yard completion to reserve receiver Jim Gustafson and was capped by running back Alfred Anderson's 7-yard touchdown run. Then on the first play of the Rams next drive, Browner intercepted another pass from Jim Everett and returned it 14 yards to the Los Angeles 17-yard line, where Allen Rice took it in for a touchdown on the next play.

In the second quarter, the Rams had three chances to score, but only managed to get points once. First, Mike Lansford missed a 41-yard field goal attempt (later matched by a 44-yard miss by Minnesota's Chuck Nelson). Then they drove to a third and 1 on the Vikings 30 and were stopped for no gain on consecutive running plays. But just before halftime, Everett led the team 70 yards to cut the lead in half with his 3-yard touchdown pass to tight end Damone Johnson.

Minnesota took the second half kickoff and moved the ball all the way to the end zone with a 1-yard touchdown run by Anderson, increasing their lead to 21–7. The Rams countered with a 33-yard field goal from Lansford, but in the fourth quarter, Wilson completed a 44-yard pass to Anthony Carter on the LA 5-yard line. On the next play, he threw a touchdown pass to tight end Carl Hilton, giving the team a 28–10 lead and essentially putting the game out of reach. The Rams managed one more touchdown with 1:11 left in the game on Everett's 11-yard pass to tight end Pete Holohan, but Browner recovered their onside kick attempt and the Vikings ran out the rest of the clock.

Wilson finished the game with 253 passing yards and a touchdown, while Carter caught four passes for 102 yards. Rams linebacker Kevin Greene had three sacks.

To date, this was the final NFL playoff game to take place on a Monday until 2022.

This was the sixth postseason meeting between the Rams and Vikings. Minnesota won four of the previous five meetings.

Previous playoff games
Minnesota leads 4–1 in all-time playoff games

1969

Los Angeles Rams 20 @ Minnesota Vikings 23

1969 NFL Western Conf. playoff

1974

Los Angeles Rams 7 @ Minnesota Vikings 27

1974 NFC Championship Game

1976

Los Angeles Rams 13 @ Minnesota Vikings 24

1976 NFC Championship Game

1977

Minnesota Vikings 14 @ Los Angeles Rams 7

1977 NFC Divisional playoffs

1978

Minnesota Vikings 10 @ Los Angeles Rams 34

1978 NFC Divisional playoffs

== Divisional round ==
=== Saturday, December 31, 1988 ===
==== NFC: Chicago Bears 20, Philadelphia Eagles 12 ====
Philadelphia Eagles vs. Chicago Bears – Game summary

Quarter	1	2	3	4	Total
Eagles	3	6	3	0	12
Bears	7	10	0	3	20

at Soldier Field, Chicago, Illinois

- Game time: 12:30 p.m. EST/11:30 a.m. CST
- Game weather: 25 °F (−4 °C), sunny, then fog in the 2nd half
- Game attendance: 65,534
- Referee: Jim Tunney
- TV announcers (CBS): Verne Lundquist (play-by-play) and Terry Bradshaw (color commentator)

Game information

First quarter

- CHI – Dennis McKinnon 64-yard pass from Mike Tomczak (Kevin Butler kick). Bears 7–0.
- PHI – Luis Zendejas 42-yard field goal. Bears 7–3.
- PHI – Luis Zendejas 29-yard field goal. Bears 7–6.

Second quarter

- CHI – Neal Anderson 4-yard run (Kevin Butler kick). Bears 14–6.
- CHI – Kevin Butler 46-yard field goal. Bears 17–6.
- PHI – Luis Zendejas 30-yard field goal. Bears 17–9.

Third quarter

- PHI – Luis Zendejas 35-yard field goal. Bears 17–12.

Fourth quarter

- CHI – Kevin Butler 27-yard field goal. Bears 20–12.

Top passers

- PHI – Randall Cunningham – 27/54, 407 yards, 3 INT
- CHI – Mike Tomczak – 10/20, 172 yards, TD, 3 INT

Top rushers

- PHI – Keith Byars – 7 rushes, 34 yards
- CHI – Thomas Sanders – 8 rushes, 94 yards

Top receivers

- PHI – Keith Jackson – 7 receptions, 142 yards
- CHI – Dennis McKinnon – 4 receptions, 108 yards, TD

In a game known as the Fog Bowl, the Bears defeated the Eagles 20–12, in a contest in which a heavy, dense fog rolled over Chicago's Soldier Field during the second quarter and cut visibility to about 15–20 yards for the rest of the game.

Chicago scored first with quarterback Mike Tomczak's 64-yard touchdown pass to Dennis McKinnon. The Eagles responded by driving to the Chicago 26-yard line, but kicker Luis Zendejas missed a 43-yard field goal attempt. Philadelphia quickly got the ball back after linebacker Seth Joyner intercepted a pass from Tomczak on the next play and returned it 8 yards to the Bears 31-yard line. This time they managed to score with Zendejas' 42-yard field goal, but only after committing two costly mistakes: twice on the drive Philadelphia had touchdowns nullified by penalties, both on running back Anthony Toney. The Bears then drove to the Eagles 33-yard line on their ensuing drive, but it stalled there and kicker Kevin Butler missed a 51-yard field goal attempt, giving the ball back to Philadelphia with great field position. Quarterback Randall Cunningham then led the Eagles down the field with two completions to fullback Keith Byars for gains of 13 and 24 yards. A few plays later, faced with 3rd and 32, Cunningham completed a 31-yard pass to Ron Johnson, bringing up 4th and 1 on the Bears 4-yard line. Cunningham tried to convert the 4th down with a QB sneak, but after a chain measurement which took several minutes, officials ruled the ball short of a first down. The Eagles soon got another chance to score when Andre Waters forced a fumble from Cap Boso that was recovered by defensive back Wes Hopkins on the Chicago 15. Following another missed chance at a touchdown when rookie tight end Keith Jackson dropped a wide open pass in the end zone, Zendejas' 29-yard field goal to cut the deficit to 7–6.

Philadelphia tackled Chicago returner Dennis Gentry on the 22 on the ensuing kickoff, but the kick had to be redone due to an offsides penalty on the Eagles. This proved to be hugely beneficial for Chicago, as on the second kick, Glen Kozlowski returned the ball 23 yards to the Philadelphia 44-yard line. A few plays later, Tomczak's 30-yard completion to Ron Morris gave Chicago a first down on the Eagles 4-yard line, and Neal Anderson ran for a touchdown on the next play to give them a 14–6 lead. Then after forcing a punt, Thomas Sanders' 58-yard run set up a 46-yard field goal by Butler, increasing Chicago's lead to 17–6 with less than 2:03 left before halftime. At this point, a thick fog rolled on to field, obscuring vision so much that a CBS helicopter providing aerial coverage for the game was forced to land. Meanwhile, Philadelphia struck back with a 65-yard completion from Cunningham to Jackson that set up Zendejas' 30-yard field goal, making the score 17–9. Philadelphia got another chance to score when linebacker Todd Bell intercepted a pass from Tomczak, giving the Eagles the ball on the Bears 42-yard line with just over 30 seconds left in the half. But this was taken away as Bears linebacker Mickey Pruitt intercepted Cunningham to bring an end to the following drive.

Philadelphia took the second half kickoff and drove to the Bears 12-yard line, only to lose the ball again when Cunningham threw a pass that went off the hands of Toney and was intercepted by Vestee Jackson, who returned the ball 51 yards to the Eagles 41-yard line. Chicago then drove to the 15, but also came up empty when Butler's field goal attempt went off the goal post. Following a punt, Tomczak was knocked out of the game by a massive hit from Eagles defensive end Reggie White, while Terry Hoage intercepted his pass and returned it 12 yards to the Chicago 18-yard line. Three plays later, Zendejas kicked a 35-yard field goal, making the score 17–12 with less than two minutes left in the third quarter.

Chicago, now led by Jim McMahon, responded with their next drive, converting a 23-yard run by Anderson into a 27-yard Butler field goal to go back up by 8 points, 20–12 with 12:34 left in the game. Philadelphia responded with a drive to the Bears 22, but on third down, a long sack by Sean Smith pushed them out of field goal range. The next time they got the ball, Maurice Douglass intercepted a pass from Cunningham, enabling Chicago to run out the rest of the clock.

Cunningham finished the game with 407 passing yards, but was unable to lead his team to a single touchdown and was intercepted three times. Other than a 64-yard touchdown pass, Tomczak was dominated the rest of the game by the Eagles defense, completing only 10 of 20 passes for 174 yards with a touchdown and three interceptions. Sanders rushed 8 times for 94 yards and caught a pass for 8. McKinnon finished the game with four receptions for 108 yards and a touchdown. Byars rushed for 34 yards and caught nine passes for 103 yards. Jackson caught seven passes for 142 yards.

This was the second postseason meeting between the Eagles and Bears. Philadelphia won the only prior meeting.

Previous playoff games
Philadelphia leads 1–0 in all-time playoff games

1979

Chicago Bears 17 @ Philadelphia Eagles 27

1979 NFC wild card playoffs

==== AFC: Cincinnati Bengals 21, Seattle Seahawks 13 ====
Seattle Seahawks vs. Cincinnati Bengals – Game summary

Quarter	1	2	3	4	Total
Seahawks	0	0	0	13	13
Bengals	7	14	0	0	21

at Riverfront Stadium, Cincinnati, Ohio

- Game time: 4:00 p.m. EST
- Game weather: 32 °F (0 °C), mostly sunny
- Game attendance: 58,560
- Referee: Red Cashion
- TV announcers (NBC): Dick Enberg (play-by-play) and Merlin Olsen (color commentator)

Game information

First quarter

- CIN – Stanley Wilson 3-yard run (Jim Breech kick). Bengals 7–0.

Second quarter

- CIN – Stanley Wilson 3-yard run (Jim Breech kick). Bengals 14–0.
- CIN – Ickey Woods 1-yard run (Jim Breech kick). Bengals 21–0.

Third quarter

- No scoring plays.

Fourth quarter

- SEA – John L. Williams 7-yard pass from Dave Krieg (Norm Johnson kick). Bengals 21–7.
- SEA – Dave Krieg 1-yard run (kick failed). Bengals 21–13.

Top passers

- SEA – Dave Krieg – 24/50, 297 yards, TD, 2 INT
- CIN – Boomer Esiason – 7/19, 108 yards

Top rushers

- SEA – Curt Warner – 8 rushes, 11 yards
- CIN – Ickey Woods – 23 rushes, 126 yards, TD

Top receivers

- SEA – John L. Williams – 11 receptions, 137 yards, TD
- CIN – Rodney Holman – 3 receptions, 44 yards

Seattle's defense completely shut down Bengals quarterback Boomer Esiason, the NFL's MVP and top rated quarterback during the season, as he completed just seven of 19 passes for 108 yards. But they were unable to contain Cincinnati on the ground. The Bengals recorded 254 rushing yards (126 of them and a touchdown from fullback Ickey Woods, a franchise postseason record, 72 from James Brooks, and 47 from Stanley Wilson), while holding the Seahawks to 18.

Nearly half of Esiason's passing yards on the day came from two completions on their opening possession, a 30-yarder to Cris Collinsworth along the right sideline and a 23-yard leaping catch on the middle of the field by Eddie Brown, as the team consumed 5:49 with an 11-play, 85-yard drive and scored on Wilson's 3-yard touchdown run. Following an exchange of punts, Bengals cornerback Eric Thomas intercepted a long pass from Dave Krieg on the Bengals 25-yard line. Tight end Rodney Holman subsequently caught two passes for 20 yards and Brooks ripped off a 26-yard run as the team drove to a 14–0 lead on Wilson's second 3-yard touchdown run just over four minutes into the second quarter. Seattle was forced to a three-and-out on their possession, and Ira Hillary returned Ruben Rodriguez's 42-yard punt three yards to the Bengals 44-yard line. On the next play, Woods took a handoff and raced down the right sideline for a 30-yard carry to the Seattle 26. Then Brooks ran the ball in the opposite direction, rushing 17 yards to the 9. Wilson got the ball next, slicing through the middle for an 8-yard gain. The Seahawks defense managed to stuff Woods for no gain on the next play, but on third down, he scored a 1-yard touchdown run to give the Bengals a 21–0 lead with 7:40 left in the half.

At the end of the next drive, the Seahawks finally got a chance to score when Hillary muffed a punt and Melvin Jenkins recovered for Seattle on the Bengals 24-yard line. Two plays later, Krieg's 14-yard completion to fullback John L. Williams (Seattle's longest gain of the half) brought up first down and goal. But on the next play, nose tackle Tim Krumrie stripped the ball from Williams and defensive end Jim Skow recovered it to keep the score 21–0 at halftime. The Bengals had dominated the first half, massively outgaining Seattle in rushing yards (167–0), total yards (241–49), first downs (16–3), and time of possession (20:35–9:25).

Midway through the third quarter, Seattle drove deep into Bengals territory, aided by a 23-yard reception by Williams and a 24-yard pass interference penalty against Thomas on third and 21. But once again the Seahawks failed to score when defensive back Ray Horton broke up Krieg's pass on fourth down and goal from the 2-yard line. Cincinnati then drove to the Seattle 3-yard line, featuring a 24-yard catch by Holman, but they also turned the ball over on downs, as Woods was dropped for a 1-yard gain on fourth down and 2 with under a minute left in the third quarter.

Early in the final quarter, after Krieg was intercepted by Solomon Wilcots, Jacob Green forced a fumble while sacking Esiason and defensive end Joe Nash recovered it. Now with the ball on the Bengals 31-yard line, Seattle attempted a fourth quarter comeback. Krieg started off the drive with a pair of completions to rookie receiver Brian Blades and tight end John Spagnola for gains of 17 and seven yards before eventually converting a fourth down and 3 with a 7-yard touchdown pass to Williams, cutting the score to 21–7 with 11:40 left in the game. Then after forcing a punt, Seattle drove 69 yards, including a 32-yard reception by Ray Butler, to score on Krieg's 1-yard touchdown run with 6:04 remaining. But Norm Johnson missed the extra point, keeping his team behind by two scores, 21–13. Later in the quarter, Cincinnati punter Lee Johnson essentially put the game away with a 43-yard kick that pinned Seattle back at their own 2-yard line with just over two minutes remaining, and the Seahawks turned the ball over on downs on their final drive.

Williams finished the game with 11 receptions for 137 yards and a touchdown, along with 10 rushing yards.

After the game, the Bengals accused Seattle of having their players fake injuries in an attempt to stop the game and counter Cincinnati's frequent use of the no-huddle offense. Nash and Ken Clarke both collapsed a total of six times during the game, all before third down plays. In each case they returned to play in the game.

This ended up being the Seahawks’ last playoff game until 1999. This was also the last divisional playoff game contested in December.

This was the first postseason meeting between the Seahawks and Bengals.

=== Sunday, January 1, 1989 ===
==== AFC: Buffalo Bills 17, Houston Oilers 10 ====
Houston Oilers vs. Buffalo Bills – Game summary

Quarter	1	2	3	4	Total
Oilers	0	3	0	7	10
Bills	0	7	7	3	17

at Rich Stadium, Orchard Park, New York

- Game time: 12:30 p.m. EST
- Game attendance: 79,532
- Referee: Gordon McCarter
- TV announcers (NBC): Marv Albert (play-by-play) and Paul Maguire (color commentator)

Game information

First quarter

- No scoring plays.

Second quarter

- BUF – Rob Riddick 1-yard run (Scott Norwood kick). Bills 7–0.
- HOU – Tony Zendejas 35-yard field goal. Bills 7–3.

Third quarter

- BUF – Thurman Thomas 11-yard run (Scott Norwood kick). Bills 14–3.

Fourth quarter

- BUF – Scott Norwood 27-yard field goal. Bills 17–3.
- HOU – Mike Rozier 1-yard run (Tony Zendejas kick). Bills 17–10.

Top passers

- HOU – Warren Moon – 17/33, 240 yards, INT
- BUF – Jim Kelly – 19/33, 244 yards, INT

Top rushers

- HOU – Alonzo Highsmith – 5 rushes, 57 yards
- BUF – Thurman Thomas – 7 rushes, 75 yards, TD

Top receivers

- HOU – Haywood Jeffires – 5 receptions, 78 yards
- BUF – Andre Reed – 6 receptions, 91 yards

This was the first home playoff game for Buffalo since the 1966 AFL Championship Game. Although both teams blew scoring chances throughout the game, the Bills dominated Houston for most of the time, blocking a punt, converting a turnover into the game-clinching field goal, and forcing a turnover on Houston's final drive to defeat a comeback attempt.

On their first drive of the game, Buffalo drove to the Oilers 18-yard line. But a bad snap on third down pushed them back to the 32 and Scott Norwood came up short on a 50-yard field goal attempt. Houston then moved the ball to the Bills 32, but Bruce Smith's 13-yard sack of quarterback Warren Moon on third down pushed them out of field goal range. On the ensuing punt, Greg Montgomery's kick was blocked by Buffalo safety Leonard Smith, allowing the Bills to take over on the Oilers 46. Buffalo quarterback Jim Kelly subsequently completed two passes to Trumaine Johnson for 28 yards on a 46-yard drive that ended with Robb Riddick's 1-yard touchdown run. Houston responded by driving 71 yards, with Moon completing a 21-yard pass to Drew Hill and Alonzo Highsmith rushing for a 31-yard gain, to score with a 35-yard field goal from Tony Zendejas. Following a punt, Houston threatened to score again with a drive to the Bills 25-yard line, but Smith blocked Zendejas' second field goal attempt and the score remained 7–3 at halftime.

In the third quarter, Houston got another scoring opportunity when Tracey Eaton intercepted a pass from Kelly on the Bills 47-yard line. Moon led his team inside the 5-yard line, but after an errant pitchout lost 12 yards, Zendejas missed a 31-yard field goal attempt. Following an exchange of punts, Buffalo drove 59 yards in six plays, with Kelly completing a pass to Chris Burkett for 26 yards and rushing for 10 yards, to score on rookie running back Thurman Thomas' 11-yard touchdown run. Near the end of the quarter, Kelly's 55-yard completion to Andre Reed gave the Bills a first down on the Houston 2-yard line. But the Oilers defense made a big goal line stand, keeping them out of the end zone for four consecutive plays to force a turnover on downs.

Two plays after the turnover, Mark Kelso intercepted a pass from Moon and returned it 28 yards to the Oilers 18-yard line, setting up Norwood's 27-yard field goal to increase their lead to 17–3. Buffalo's defense forced another turnover on Houston's ensuing drive when Derrick Burroughs recovered a fumble from receiver Haywood Jeffires on the Oilers 26-yard line. The Bills now had a chance to put the game away, but Norwood hit the uprights on a 36-yard field goal attempt.

Moon then completed four passes, including a 29-yarder to receiver Leonard Harris, on a 9-play, 80-yard drive. A pass interference penalty on Burroughs in the end zone moved the ball to the Bills 1, and running back Mike Rozier ran it in from there, cutting the score to 17–10 with just over five minutes left in the game. The Oilers subsequently forced a punt at the two-minute warning, but Steve Tasker forced a fumble while tackling wide receiver Curtis Duncan during the punt return, and linebacker Ray Bentley recovered the ball, allowing Buffalo to run out the clock.

This was the first postseason meeting between the Oilers and Bills. It was the first Divisional Round playoff victory for the Bills, clinching their first appearance in an AFC Championship in team history.

==== NFC: San Francisco 49ers 34, Minnesota Vikings 9 ====
Minnesota Vikings vs. San Francisco 49ers – Game summary

Quarter	1	2	3	4	Total
Vikings	3	0	6	0	9
49ers	7	14	0	13	34

at Candlestick Park, San Francisco, California

- Game time: 4:00 p.m. EST/1:00 p.m. PST
- Game attendance: 61,848
- Referee: Jerry Markbreit
- TV announcers (CBS): Pat Summerall (play-by-play) and John Madden (color commentator)

Game information

First quarter

- MIN – Chuck Nelson 47-yard field goal. Vikings 3–0.
- SF – Jerry Rice 2-yard pass from Joe Montana (Mike Cofer kick). 49ers 7–3.

Second quarter

- SF – Jerry Rice 4-yard pass from Joe Montana (Mike Cofer kick). 49ers 14–3.
- SF – Jerry Rice 11-yard pass from Joe Montana (Mike Cofer kick). 49ers 21–3.

Third quarter

- MIN – Hassan Jones 5-yard pass from Wade Wilson (kick failed). 49ers 21–9.

Fourth quarter

- SF – Roger Craig 4-yard run (Mike Cofer kick). 49ers 28–9.
- SF – Roger Craig 80-yard run (kick failed). 49ers 34–9.

Top passers

- MIN – Wade Wilson – 23/47, 255 yards, TD, 2 INT
- SF – Joe Montana – 16/27, 178 yards, 3 TD, INT

Top rushers

- MIN – Rick Fenney – 6 rushes, 20 yards
- SF – Roger Craig – 21 rushes, 135 yards, 2 TD

Top receivers

- MIN – Hassan Jones – 7 receptions, 71 yards, TD
- SF – Jerry Rice – 5 receptions, 61 yards, 3 TD

In what would turn out to be Bill Walsh's final home game as 49ers head coach, San Francisco quarterback Joe Montana threw for 178 yards and three touchdowns to wide receiver Jerry Rice, while running back Roger Craig rushed for 135 yards and two touchdowns and safety Ronnie Lott added two interceptions. Overall, the 49ers gained 376 yards, including 201 on the ground, while holding the Vikings to 262 yards and sacking quarterback Wade Wilson six times. 49ers defensive end Larry Roberts had 2.5 sacks.

Minnesota scored first on a 51-yard, 12-play drive that ended with Chuck Nelson's 47-yard field goal. But later in the quarter, John Taylor's 14-yard punt return and a penalty against Minnesota's Sam Anno gave the 49ers the ball on the Vikings 48, setting up Montana's first touchdown pass to Rice on a 2-yard toss. On the next series, Lott's interception gave San Francisco a first down on the Minnesota 30-yard line. Rice started off their drive with a 21-yard run on a double reverse play, and eventually caught a 4-yard touchdown pass that gave the 49ers a 14–3 lead in the second quarter. Rice added a third touchdown reception with 38 seconds left in the half, increasing the team's lead to 21–3.

The Vikings scored on their first possession of the second half with Wilson's 5-yard pass to Hassan Jones, but Nelson missed the extra point and the team would get no closer than 21–9. In the fourth quarter, Craig finished off an 80-yard drive with a 4-yard touchdown run, and scored on an NFL postseason record 80-yard touchdown run on the 49ers' next drive.

This was the third postseason meeting between the Vikings and 49ers. Both teams split the first two meetings, with the road team winning each.

Previous playoff games
Tied 1–1 in all-time playoff games

1970

San Francisco 49ers 17 @ Minnesota Vikings 14

1970 NFC Divisional playoffs

1987

Minnesota Vikings 36 @ San Francisco 49ers 24

1987 NFC Divisional playoffs

== Conference championships ==
=== Sunday, January 8, 1989 ===
==== AFC: Cincinnati Bengals 21, Buffalo Bills 10 ====
Buffalo Bills vs. Cincinnati Bengals – Game summary

Quarter	1	2	3	4	Total
Bills	0	10	0	0	10
Bengals	7	7	0	7	21

at Riverfront Stadium, Cincinnati, Ohio

- Game time: 12:30 p.m. EST
- Game attendance: 59,747
- Referee: Gene Barth
- TV announcers (NBC): Dick Enberg (play-by-play) and Merlin Olsen (color commentator)

Game information

First quarter

- CIN – Ickey Woods 1-yard run (Jim Breech kick). Bengals 7–0.

Second quarter

- BUF – Andre Reed 9-yard pass from Jim Kelly (Scott Norwood kick). Tied 7–7.
- CIN – James Brooks 10-yard pass from Boomer Esiason (Jim Breech kick). Bengals 14–7.
- BUF – Scott Norwood 39-yard field goal. Bengals 14–10.

Third quarter

- No scoring plays.

Fourth quarter

- CIN – Ickey Woods 1-yard run (Jim Breech kick). Bengals 21–10.

Top passers

- BUF – Jim Kelly – 14/30, 163 yards, TD, 3 INT
- CIN – Boomer Esiason – 11/20, 94 yards, TD, 2 INT

Top rushers

- BUF – Jamie Mueller – 8 rushes, 21 yards
- CIN – Ickey Woods – 29 rushes, 102 yards, 2 TD

Top receivers

- BUF – Andre Reed – 5 receptions, 55 yards, TD
- CIN – Rodney Holman – 4 receptions, 38 yards

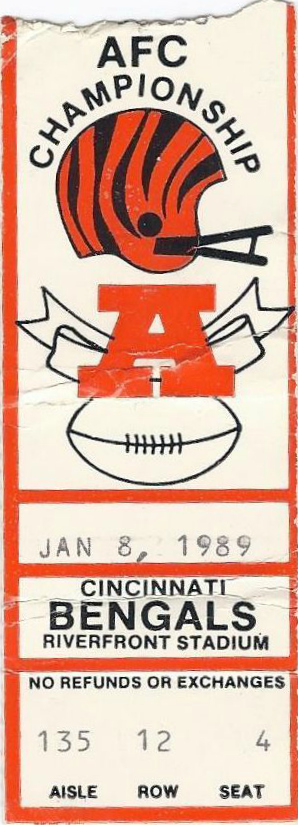
A ticket for the AFC Championship Game between the Bengals and the Bills.

Before the game began, a controversy arose over Cincinnati's no-huddle offense. Bills coach Marv Levy criticized the strategy as against the rules, as it was done with intent to deceive. There was suggestion that the Bills might counter this by simulating injuries in order to stop the clock, as the Seahawks were alleged to have done against the Bengals. However, Levy stated that the Bills would not do so. The NFL stated beforehand that neither action would result in a penalty. Prior to the game, both Levy and Cincinnati coach Sam Wyche told reporters that they did not believe that the other would behave unethically.

The Bengals forced three interceptions, and allowed only 45 rushing yards and 136 passing yards, while their offense held the ball for 39:29. Bills starting running back Thurman Thomas was held to just six yards on four carries, while quarterback Jim Kelly completed only 14 of 30 passes for 161 yards and a touchdown, with three interceptions. The Bills had only 10 first downs, one more than the AFC Championship record for the fewest ever, and failed to convert any of their 10 third down conversion attempts. Just like their previous game, the Bengals did not get much of a performance from NFL MVP Boomer Esiason, who completed only 11 of 20 passes for 94 yards, with a touchdown and two interceptions. But once again, their running game was able to pick up the slack, gaining 175 yards on the ground, 102 yards and two touchdowns coming from fullback Ickey Woods.

Buffalo started their first drive on their 46-yard line, but it ended with an interception by Bengals cornerback Lewis Billups. On the next play, Esiason's 29-yard run moved the team into scoring range. However, they also came up empty when Esiason's pass was intercepted by Bills linebacker Ray Bentley. Later on, Cincinnati took a 7–0 lead in the first quarter after Eric Thomas' 26-yard interception return to the Bills 4-yard line set up Woods' 1-yard touchdown run. However, a 15-yard unnecessary roughness penalty against Bengals running back Stanley Wilson (one of six personal foul penalties in the game, two by the Bengals and four by the Bills) after the touchdown was assessed on the ensuing kickoff, and Buffalo ended up getting the ball with good field position with Ronnie Harmon's 22-yard return to the 43-yard line. Kelly subsequently led the Bills back with four consecutive completions, starting out with a pair of throws to receiver Andre Reed for gains of nine and 19 yards and then hooking up with Trumaine Johnson for a 22-yard gain to the Bengals 9-yard line. On the next play, Kelly found Reed in the right corner of the end zone for a touchdown pass to tie the game.

Following a punt, Buffalo drove to the Bengals 26-yard line, only to have Scott Norwood miss a 43-yard field goal attempt. The Bengals then took over and stormed down the field on an 11-play, 74-yard drive, including a 16-yard run by Woods, to score on Esiason's 10-yard touchdown pass to running back James Brooks. Later on, Mark Kelso intercepted a pass from Esiason and returned it 25 yards to the Bengals 29-yard line, setting up a 39-yard field goal by Norwood to cut the Bills deficit to 14–10 by halftime.

The Bengals took over the game in the second half, forcing Buffalo to start all of their drives from inside their own 23-yard line as they held the ball for only 9:04, totaling 53 yards, two first downs, and no points. On their first three drives of the second half, the Bills totaled −12 yards. Midway through the third quarter, Cincinnati punter Lee Johnson pinned the Bills at their own 1-yard line with a 58-yard kick. Buffalo then went three-and-out, and Bengals receiver Ira Hillary returned John Kidd's 50-yard punt 15 yards to the Bills 40. Three plays into their ensuing drive, Cincinnati faced fourth down and 4. Wilson ran six yards for a first down on a fake punt, enabling the Bengals to keep driving for a clutch score. Later in the drive, Derrick Burroughs was ejected from the game for striking receiver Tim McGee in the head, turning what would have been a third and goal from the 8 into a first and goal from the 4-yard line, and Cincinnati ended up scoring with Woods' 1-yard touchdown run on the first play of the fourth quarter, increasing their lead to 21–10. The Bills later managed a drive to the Bengals 18-yard line, but safety David Fulcher picked off a desperate fourth-down pass from Kelly in the end zone.

The Bills would not lose another game to the Bengals until Week 4 of the 2011 NFL season.

This was the second postseason meeting between the Bills and Bengals. Cincinnati won the only previous meeting.

Previous playoff games
Cincinnati leads 1–0 in all-time playoff games

1981

Buffalo Bills 21 @ Cincinnati Bengals 28

1981 AFC Divisional playoffs

==== NFC: San Francisco 49ers 28, Chicago Bears 3 ====
San Francisco 49ers vs. Chicago Bears – Game summary

Quarter	1	2	3	4	Total
49ers	7	7	7	7	28
Bears	0	3	0	0	3

at Soldier Field, Chicago, Illinois

- Game time: 4:00 p.m. EST/3:00 p.m. CST
- Game attendance: 66,946
- Referee: Bob McElwee
- TV announcers (CBS): Pat Summerall (play-by-play) and John Madden (color commentator)

Game information

First quarter

- SF – Jerry Rice 61-yard pass from Joe Montana (Mike Cofer kick). 49ers 7–0.

Second quarter

- SF – Jerry Rice 27-yard pass from Joe Montana (Mike Cofer kick). 49ers 14–0.
- CHI – Kevin Butler 25-yard field goal. 49ers 14–3.

Third quarter

- SF – John Frank 5-yard pass from Joe Montana (Mike Cofer kick). 49ers 21–3.

Fourth quarter

- SF – Tom Rathman 4-yard run (Mike Cofer kick). 49ers 28–3.

Top passers

- SF – Joe Montana – 17/27, 288 yards, 3 TD
- CHI – Jim McMahon – 14/29, 121 yards, INT

Top rushers

- SF – Roger Craig – 18 rushes, 68 yards
- CHI – Neal Anderson – 14 rushes, 59 yards

Top receivers

- SF – Jerry Rice – 7 receptions, 133 yards, 2 TD
- CHI – James Thornton – 4 receptions, 52 yards

Despite playing in a game-time temperature of 17 °F (−8 °C), a wind chill of −26 °F (−32 °C), and wind gusts up to 30 mph (48 km/h), the 49ers scored a touchdown in every quarter and gained 406 total yards of offense while limiting Chicago quarterback Jim McMahon to just 121 passing yards with no touchdowns and an interception. Chicago only made it inside the San Francisco 40-yard line twice during the entire NFC Championship game.

San Francisco quarterback Joe Montana threw for 288 yards and three touchdowns, including completing nine of 15 passes for 199 yards and two touchdowns in the first half. After the first five possessions of the game ended in punts, the 49ers faced a third and long from their own 39-yard line. Despite the high winds, Montana was able to throw a long pass to Rice, who, despite double coverage from Bears defenders Mike Richardson and Todd Krumm, was able to catch the pass and outrun both defenders to score a 61-yard touchdown.

Midway through the second quarter, Jeff Fuller intercepted a pass from McMahon on the San Francisco 36, and the team moved the ball 64 yards on a drive that included Rice's 20-yard catch and Tom Rathman's 12-yard run on third and 10. Montana finished the series with a 27-yard touchdown pass to Rice in which he caught a low slant pass in stride and scored untouched. Chicago responded with a 25-yard field goal by Kevin Butler. Then Vestee Jackson recovered a fumble from receiver John Taylor on the Bears 18-yard line with 2:45 left in the half. Chicago subsequently advanced to the 49ers 47, but on third down, cornerback Don Griffin tackled Neal Anderson for a 5-yard loss and forced a punt.

In the third quarter, the 49ers marched 78 yards, including a 17-yard reception by Rice, to score on Montana's 5-yard touchdown pass to tight end John Frank. San Francisco's final score was Rathman's 4-yard touchdown run.

Rice finished the game with five receptions for 133 yards and two touchdowns. Fuller had an interception and 10 tackles, while linebacker Michael Walter had 11. This was San Francisco's first playoff win on the road since the 1970 season. It was also the first time an NFC team won a conference title on the road since 1979. As it turned out, this was the third and final NFC Championship Game appearance for the Bears in the Ditka era (having previously appeared in January 1985 and January 1986). They would not reach the NFC Championship Game again for nearly two decades.

This was the second postseason meeting between the 49ers and Bears. San Francisco won the only prior meeting.

Previous playoff games
San Francisco leads 1–0 in all-time playoff games

1984

Chicago Bears 0 @ San Francisco 49ers 23

1984 NFC Championship Game

== Super Bowl XXIII: San Francisco 49ers 20, Cincinnati Bengals 16 ==
Super Bowl XXIII – Cincinnati Bengals vs. San Francisco 49ers – Game summary

Quarter	1	2	3	4	Total
Bengals (AFC)	0	3	10	3	16
49ers (NFC)	3	0	3	14	20

at Joe Robbie Stadium, Miami, Florida

- Date: January 22, 1989
- Game attendance: 75,129
- Referee: Jerry Seeman
- TV announcers (NBC): Dick Enberg (play-by-play) and Merlin Olsen (color commentator)

This was the second Super Bowl meeting between the Bengals and 49ers. San Francisco won the only prior meeting.

Previous playoff games
San Francisco leads 1–0 in all-time playoff games

1981

San Francisco 49ers 26 vs. Cincinnati Bengals 21

Super Bowl XVI
