= 1988 Cincinnati Bengals season =

NFL team season (lost Super Bowl)

- Head coach: Sam Wyche
- Offensive coordinator: Bruce Coslet
- Defensive coordinator: Dick LeBeau
- Home stadium: Riverfront Stadium

Results
- Record: 12–4
- Division place: 1st AFC Central
- Playoffs: Won Divisional Playoffs (vs. Seahawks) 21–13; Won AFC Championship (vs. Bills) 21–10; Lost Super Bowl XXIII (vs. 49ers) 16–20

The 1988 Cincinnati Bengals season was the team's 21st year in professional football and its 19th with the National Football League (NFL).

After coming off a disappointing 1987 season, the Bengals tied for the best record in the NFL in 1988, secured home-field advantage throughout the playoffs, and won the AFC Championship by defeating the Buffalo Bills 21–10, but lost Super Bowl XXIII to the San Francisco 49ers 20–16.

The Bengals went 8–0 at home in 1988 and 4–4 on the road. The 1988 Bengals were featured in the NFL Films series The Missing Rings, being included as one of the five best teams in NFL history not to have won the Super Bowl. The Bengals would not play in the Super Bowl or AFC Championship again until the 2021 season.

== Season summary ==
During the strike shortened 1987 season, quarterback Boomer Esiason and head coach Sam Wyche had openly feuded, and the team finished with a miserable 4–11 record. Esiason and Wyche worked out their differences in the offseason. In 1988 Esiason ended up having the best season of his career en route to Super Bowl XXIII. During the regular season, he threw for 3,572 yards and 28 touchdown passes with only 14 interceptions, while also rushing for 248 yards and a touchdown on 43 carries. Esiason's performance made him the top rated quarterback in the league with a 97.4 passer rating and earned him the NFL Most Valuable Player Award.

Cincinnati had a number of offensive weapons, boasting 6 Pro Bowl selections. Wide receiver Eddie Brown was the top receiver on the team, with 54 receptions for 1,273 yards and 9 touchdowns, setting franchise records for most receiving yards in season, highest yards per catch average in a season (24.0) and most receiving yards in a single game (216 against the Pittsburgh Steelers). Wide receiver Tim McGee and Pro Bowl tight end Rodney Holman were also major threats, combining for 75 receptions, 1,213 yards, and 9 touchdowns.

Rookie fullback Ickey Woods was Cincinnati's top rusher with 1,066 yards and 15 touchdowns, while also catching 21 passes for 199 yards. Woods gained a lot of media attention with his "Ickey Shuffle", a dance routine he did in the end zone to celebrate his touchdowns. Multi-talented running back James Brooks was also a key contributor, gaining a total of 1,218 combined rushing and receiving yards and 14 touchdowns.

The Bengals' offensive line was led by such Pro Bowl players as right guard Max Montoya and left tackle Anthony Muñoz. Muñoz was named the NFL Offensive Lineman of the Year for the third time in his career, and was selected to play in the Pro Bowl for the 8th consecutive season. The Bengals' pioneering use of the Hurry-up offense was perfected that year, making it difficult for defenders to respond to plays and make proper substitutions. With all these weapons, Cincinnati's offense led the NFL in scoring (448 points), rushing yards (2,710), and total yards (6,302).

The Bengals defense ranked 17th in the league, allowing 5,556 yards and 329 points during the regular season. Cincinnati had a superb defensive line, led by Pro Bowl nose tackle Tim Krumrie, along with defensive ends Jim Skow (9.5 sacks), David Grant (5 sacks), and Jason Buck (6 sacks). Pro Bowl cornerback Eric Thomas and safety David Fulcher combined for 12 interceptions. The team ended up winning the AFC Central with a 12 – 4 record.

The Bengals would get off to a fast start, coming from behind to beat the Phoenix Cardinals 21–14, and then they would sweep a 2-week road trip in Pennsylvania, coming from behind to beat the Philadelphia Eagles 28–24 and the Pittsburgh Steelers 17–12 in weeks 2 and 3. The Bengals would then beat the Cleveland Browns at home 24–17 to start 4-0 for the first time since 1975. The Bengals would then thump the Raiders in Los Angeles 45–21 (the Bengals first road win against the Raiders in 9 tries), and then would beat the New York Jets 36–19 at home to start 6–0, tying the franchise best start to a season at the time. In week 7 the New England Patriots would provide the Bengals with their first loss of the season, 21–27. Boomer threw for 5 interceptions which was featured on Showtimes Inside the NFL season 10 episode 12.

In week 10, the Bengals destroyed the Pittsburgh Steelers 42–7 at home to set the records in the series for largest margin of victory and most points scored by one team in the series. It would also be the first of 3 straight season sweeps of the Steelers for the Bengals.

In week 14, the Bengals beat the Buffalo Bills 35–21, handing Buffalo only their second loss of the season. The Bills had come into the game with an 11–1 record and the overall best record in the NFL.

In the seasons final week, the Bengals came from behind to beat the defending Super Bowl Champions, the Washington Redskins, 20–17 in overtime to clinch the AFC Central and the 1 seed in the AFC. The game was won on a Jim Breech field goal.

== Super Bowl XXIII ==
The AFC Champion Bengals were to play the San Francisco 49ers in Super Bowl XXIII. However, they suffered a massive blow before the game was even played. On the evening of January 21, 1989, the night before the game, Stanley Wilson told the coaching staff that he had left his playbook in his hotel room before the final team meeting. When he was fifteen minutes late, his position coach, Jim Anderson, looked for Wilson. Anderson found Wilson crumpled on the bathroom floor of his hotel room with cocaine next to him. Later that night, he slipped away from a Bengal staffer who was watching him and got more cocaine. No one from the Bengals heard from him again until the day after the game. Unfortunately for Cincinnati, they had no choice but to leave Wilson off the roster, which may have contributed to their loss to San Francisco, in part due to the number of short yardage situations they faced throughout the game.

Tim Krumrie may perhaps be best known for suffering one of the most dramatic football injuries ever televised, a shattered leg during Super Bowl XXIII. Although it was reported at the time and widely believed that his foot caught in the grass, causing the break, a Cincinnati videographer had the best angle, and the breaks to Krumrie's leg occurred when San Francisco running back Roger Craig's knee smashed through both lower leg bones. Krumrie suffered two breaks in his tibia and another in his fibula.

== Offseason ==
=== NFL draft ===
1988 Cincinnati Bengals draft
Round	Pick	Player	Position	College	Notes
1	5	Rickey Dixon	S	Oklahoma	
2	31	Ickey Woods	RB	UNLV	
3	57	Kevin Walker	LB	Maryland	
4	84	David Grant	DE	West Virginia	
5	114	Herb Wester	OT	Iowa	
6	141	Paul Jetton	C	Texas	
7	168	Rich Romer	LB	Union	
8	195	Curtis Maxey	DT	Grambling State	
9	226	Brandy Wells	CB	Notre Dame	
10	253	Ellis Dillahunt	S	East Carolina	
11	280	Paul Hickert	K	Murray State	
12	307	Carl Parker	WR	Vanderbilt	
Made roster

== Roster ==
1988 Cincinnati Bengals roster
Quarterbacks (QB): 7 Boomer Esiason; 12 Mike Norseth; 15 Turk Schonert; Running backs (RB): 21 James Brooks; 36 Stanford Jennings; 23 Marc Logan; 32 Stanley Wilson; 31 Ickey Woods; Wide receivers (WR): 81 Eddie Brown; 80 Cris Collinsworth; 89 Ira Hillary; 85 Tim McGee; 86 Carl Parker; Tight ends (TE): 82 Rodney Holman; 87 Jim Riggs	Offensive linemen (OL): 74 Brian Blados G; 67 David Douglas T; 64 Bruce Kozerski G; 65 Max Montoya G; 78 Anthony Muñoz T; 75 Bruce Reimers G; 77 Jim Rourke G; 60 Dave Smith T; 63 Joe Walter T; Defensive linemen (DL): 99 Jason Buck DE; 98 David Grant NT; 69 Tim Krumrie NT; 96 Curtis Maxey NT; 72 Skip McClendon DE; 70 Jim Skow DE	Linebackers (LB): 53 Leo Barker ILB; 58 Joe Kelly ILB; 90 Emanuel King OLB; 51 Leon White OLB; 57 Reggie Williams OLB; 91 Carl Zander ILB; Defensive backs (DB): 24 Lewis Billups CB; 27 Barney Bussey FS; 29 Rickey Dixon CB; 33 David Fulcher SS; 20 Ray Horton CB; 25 Daryl Smith CB; 22 Eric Thomas CB; 41 Solomon Wilcots FS; Special teams (ST): 55 Ed Brady LS; 3 Jim Breech K; 11 Lee Johnson P	Reserve: 35 Chris Barber S (IR); 34 Ellis Dillahunt S (IR); 73 Eddie Edwards DE (IR); 17 Scott Fulhage P (IR); 71 Mike Hammerstein DE (PUP); 40 John Holifield RB (IR); 68 Paul Jetton C (IR); 84 Eric Kattus TE (IR); 88 Mike Martin WR (IR); 94 Rich Romer LB (IR); 59 Kevin Walker LB (IR); Rookies in italics 47 active, 11 reserve

== Regular season ==
=== Schedule ===
Week	Date	Opponent	Result	Record	Venue	Recap
1	September 4	Phoenix Cardinals	**W** 21–14	1–0	Riverfront Stadium	Recap
2	September 11	at Philadelphia Eagles	**W** 28–24	2–0	Veterans Stadium	Recap
3	September 18	at **Pittsburgh Steelers**	**W** 17–12	3–0	Three Rivers Stadium	Recap
4	September 25	**Cleveland Browns**	**W** 24–17	4–0	Riverfront Stadium	Recap
5	October 2	at Los Angeles Raiders	**W** 45–21	5–0	Los Angeles Memorial Coliseum	Recap
6	October 9	New York Jets	**W** 36–19	6–0	Riverfront Stadium	Recap
7	October 16	at New England Patriots	**L** 21–27	6–1	Sullivan Stadium	Recap
8	October 23	**Houston Oilers**	**W** 44–21	7–1	Riverfront Stadium	Recap
9	October 30	at **Cleveland Browns**	**L** 16–23	7–2	Cleveland Stadium	Recap
10	November 6	**Pittsburgh Steelers**	**W** 42–7	8–2	Riverfront Stadium	Recap
11	November 13	at Kansas City Chiefs	**L** 28–31	8–3	Arrowhead Stadium	Recap
12	November 20	at Dallas Cowboys	**W** 38–24	9–3	Texas Stadium	Recap
13	November 27	Buffalo Bills	**W** 35–21	10–3	Riverfront Stadium	Recap
14	December 4	San Diego Chargers	**W** 27–10	11–3	Riverfront Stadium	Recap
15	December 11	at **Houston Oilers**	**L** 6–41	11–4	Astrodome	Recap
16	December 17	Washington Redskins	**W** 20–17 (OT)	12–4	Riverfront Stadium	Recap
Note: Intra-division opponents are in **bold** text.

=== Game summaries ===
==== Week 1 ====
Team	1	2	3	4	Total
Cardinals	0	7	7	0	14
• Bengals	0	7	7	7	21

- Date: September 4
- Location: Riverfront Stadium
- Referee: Fred Wyant
- TV announcers (CBS): Dick Stockton and Dan Fouts

==== Week 2 ====
Team	1	2	3	4	Total
• Bengals	7	7	0	14	28
Eagles	14	0	3	7	24

- Date: September 11
- Location: Veterans Stadium
- Referee: Bob McElwee
- TV announcers (NBC): Kevin Slater and Dave Lapham

==== Week 3 ====
Cincinnati Bengals (2–0) at Pittsburgh Steelers (1–1)

Quarter	1	2	3	4	Total
Bengals	0	7	3	7	**17**
Steelers	2	0	7	3	**12**

at Three Rivers Stadium • Pittsburgh, PA

- Date: September 18
- Game time: 1:00 p.m.
- Game weather: Mostly cloudy; 73 °F (23 °C)
- Game attendance: 56,647
- Referee: Tom Dooley
- TV announcers (NBC): Jim Donovan and Reggie Rucker
- The Football Database

Game information

Bengals

- Boomer Esiason
  15/27, 223 Yds, 2 TD, INT
- James Brooks
  19 Rush, 88 Yds
- Tim McGee
  5 Rec, 73 Yds

Steelers

- Bubby Brister
  15/30, 235 Yds, TD, 2 INT
- Dwight Stone
  14 Rush, 50 Yds
  4 Rec, 76 Yds

Scoring summary

Quarter	Time	Drive			Team	Scoring information	Score	
Quarter	Time	Plays	Yards	TOP	Team	Scoring information	CIN	PIT
1	13:27				Steelers	Safety, holding penalty on Montoya in end zone	0	2
2	9:22				Bengals	Wilson 13-yard touchdown reception from Esiason, Breech kick good	7	2
3	6:55				Steelers	Lipps 9-yard touchdown reception from Brister, Anderson kick good	7	9
3	3:18				Bengals	32-yard field goal by Breech	10	9
4	11:48				Steelers	19-yard field goal by Anderson	10	12
4	10:01				Bengals	Brown 65-yard touchdown reception from Esiason, Breech kick good	17	12
"TOP" = time of possession. For other American football terms, see Glossary of American football.							17	12

==== Week 4 ====
Team	1	2	3	4	Total
Browns	3	7	0	7	17
• Bengals	7	17	0	0	24

- Date: September 25
- Location: Riverfront Stadium
- Referee: Jerry Markbreit
- TV announcers (NBC): Jim Donovan and Larry Csonka

==== Week 5 ====
Team	1	2	3	4	Total
• Bengals	3	21	14	7	45
Raiders	0	7	0	14	21

- Date: October 2
- Location: Los Angeles Memorial Coliseum
- Game start: 1:00 p.m. PST
- Game weather: 64 °F (18 °C); wind 10 mph (16 km/h)
- Referee: Jim Tunney
- TV announcers (NBC): Sam Nover and Ken Anderson

Scoring summary
Q1	CIN	Breech 28-yard field goal	CIN 3–0
Q2	CIN	Holman 14-yard pass from Esiason (Breech kick)	CIN 10–0
Q2	CIN	Woods 3-yard run (Breech kick)	CIN 17–0
Q2	LA	Brown 65-yard pass from Schroeder (Bahr kick)	CIN 17–7
Q2	CIN	McGee 9-yard pass from Esiason (Breech kick)	CIN 24–7
Q3	CIN	Jennings 5-yard run (Breech kick)	Bengals 31–7
Q3	CIN	Wilson 1 yard run (Breech kick)	CIN 38–7
Q4	CIN	Hillary 15-yard pass from Esiason (Breech kick)	CIN 45–7
Q4	LA	Schroeder 5-yard run (Chris Bahr kick)	CIN 45–14
Q4	LA	Fernandez 24-yard pass from Schroeder (Bahr kick)	CIN 45–21

==== Week 6 ====
Team	1	2	3	4	Total
Jets	9	3	7	0	19
• Bengals	6	13	7	10	36

- Date: October 9
- Location: Riverfront Stadium
- Referee: Dick Hantak
- TV announcers (NBC): Don Criqui and Bob Trumpy

==== Week 7 ====
Team	1	2	3	4	Total
Bengals	0	0	14	7	21
• Patriots	7	7	6	7	27

- Date: October 16
- Location: Sullivan Stadium
- Referee: Gene Barth
- TV announcers (NBC): Don Criqui and Bob Trumpy

==== Week 8 ====
Team	1	2	3	4	Total
Oilers	0	7	14	0	21
• Bengals	28	0	7	9	44

- Date: October 23
- Location: Riverfront Stadium
- Referee: Fred Wyant
- TV announcers (NBC): Charlie Jones and Jimmy Cefalo

==== Week 9 ====
Team	1	2	3	4	Total
Bengals	0	10	3	3	16
• Browns	3	7	10	3	23

- Date: October 30
- Location: Cleveland Stadium
- Referee: Dick Jorgensen
- TV announcers (NBC): Dick Enberg and Merlin Olsen

==== Week 10 ====
Pittsburgh Steelers (2–7) at Cincinnati Bengals (7–2)

Quarter	1	2	3	4	Total
Steelers	7	0	0	0	**7**
Bengals	14	7	14	7	**42**

at Riverfront Stadium • Cincinnati, Ohio

- Date: November 6
- Game time: 1:00 p.m.
- Game attendance: 56,403
- Referee: Red Cashion
- TV announcers (NBC): Jim Donovan and Joe Namath
- The Football Database

Game information

Steelers

- Bubby Brister
  11/29, 147 Yds
- Merril Hoge
  15 Rush, 46 Yds
- Weegie Thompson
  3 Rec, 57 Yds

Bengals

- Boomer Esiason
  16/23, 318 Yds, 3 TD, 2 INT
- Ickey Woods
  10 Rush, 110 Yds
- Eddie Brown
  7 Rec, 216 Yds, 2 TD

Scoring summary

Quarter	Time	Drive			Team	Scoring information	Score	
Quarter	Time	Plays	Yards	TOP	Team	Scoring information	PIT	CIN
1	12:13				Bengals	Brown 86-yard touchdown reception from Esiason, Breech kick good	0	7
1	6:25				Steelers	Brister 9-yard touchdown run, Anderson kick good	7	7
1	1:16				Bengals	McGee 5-yard touchdown reception from Esiason, Breech kick good	7	14
2	4:19				Bengals	Brooks 3-yard touchdown run, Breech kick good	7	21
3	12:28				Bengals	Brooks 2-yard touchdown run, Breech kick good	7	28
3	9:42				Bengals	Brown 6-yard touchdown reception from Esiason, Breech kick good	7	35
4	10:52				Bengals	Brooks 9-yard touchdown run, Breech kick good	7	42
"TOP" = time of possession. For other American football terms, see Glossary of American football.							7	42

==== Week 11 ====
Team	1	2	3	4	Total
Bengals	7	7	14	0	28
• Chiefs	6	3	10	12	31

- Date: November 13
- Location: Arrowhead Stadium
- Referee: Jerry Seeman
- TV announcers (NBC): Don Criqui and Bob Trumpy

==== Week 12 ====
Team	1	2	3	4	Total
• Bengals	7	17	7	7	38
Cowboys	3	0	7	14	24

- Date: November 20
- Location: Texas Stadium
- Referee: Gordon McCarter
- TV announcers (NBC): Jim Donovan and Ken Anderson

==== Week 13 ====
Team	1	2	3	4	Total
Bills	0	7	7	7	21
• Bengals	7	14	7	7	35

- Date: November 27
- Location: Riverfront Stadium
- Referee: Bob McElwee
- TV announcers (NBC): Marv Albert and Paul Maguire

==== Week 14 ====
Team	1	2	3	4	Total
Chargers	3	0	7	0	10
• Bengals	13	7	7	0	27

- Date: December 4
- Location: Riverfront Stadium
- Referee: Dick Hantak
- TV announcers (NBC): Tom Hammond and Joe Namath

==== Week 15 ====
Team	1	2	3	4	Total
Bengals	0	3	3	0	6
• Oilers	7	17	3	14	41

- Date: December 11
- Location: Astrodome
- Game weather: Indoors (dome)
- Referee: Tom Dooley
- TV announcers (NBC): Charlie Jones and Jimmy Cefalo

==== Week 16 ====
Team	1	2	3	4	OT	Total
Redskins	3	7	7	0	0	17
• Bengals	0	10	0	7	3	20

- Date: December 17
- Location: Riverfront Stadium
- Game start: 12:30 EST
- Game attendance: 52,157
- Referee: Red Cashion
- TV announcers (CBS): Pat Summerall & John Madden

=== Standings ===
AFC Central
	W	L	T	PCT	DIV	CONF	PF	PA	STK
^{(1)} Cincinnati Bengals	12	4	0	.750	4–2	8–4	448	329	W1
^{(4)} Cleveland Browns	10	6	0	.625	4–2	6–6	304	288	W1
^{(5)} Houston Oilers	10	6	0	.625	3–3	7–5	424	365	L1
Pittsburgh Steelers	5	11	0	.313	1–5	4–8	336	421	W1

== Playoffs ==
=== Divisional ===
Team	1	2	3	4	Total
Seahawks	0	0	0	13	13
• Bengals	7	14	0	0	21

- Location: Riverfront Stadium
- Game start: 4:00 p.m. EST
- Game attendance: 58,560
- Referee: Red Cashion
- TV announcers (NBC): Dick Enberg and Merlin Olsen

Scoring summary
Q1	CIN	Wilson 3-yard run (Breech kick)	CIN 7–0
Q2	CIN	Wilson 3-yard run (Breech kick)	CIN 14–0
Q2	CIN	Woods 1 yard run (Breech kick)	CIN 21–0
Q4	SEA	Williams 7-yard pass from Krieg (Johnson kick)	CIN 21–7
Q4	SEA	Krieg 1 yard run (kick failed)	CIN 21–13

Seattle's defense completely shut down Bengals quarterback Boomer Esiason, the NFL's top rated quarterback and MVP during the season, limiting him to just 7 of 19 completions for 108 yards. But they were unable to contain Cincinnati on the ground. The Bengals recorded 254 rushing yards (126 of them and a touchdown from fullback Ickey Woods), while holding the Seahawks to 22.

Cincinnati jumped to a 21–0 halftime lead with Woods' score and two from running back Stanley Wilson. Meanwhile, the Seahawks could only manage 47 total yards in the first half. But after a scoreless third quarter, Seattle attempted a comeback. First, quarterback Dave Krieg threw a 7-yard touchdown pass to John L. Williams, who finished the game with 11 receptions for 137 yards. Then Krieg scored on a 1-yard quarterback sneak. However, Norm Johnson missed the extra point attempt and Seattle was unable to score again.

=== AFC Championship ===
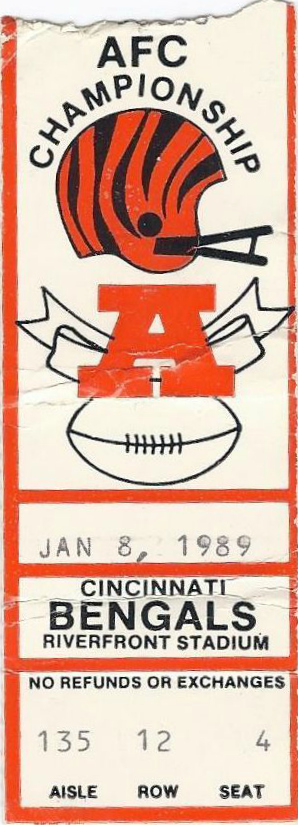
A ticket for the AFC Championship Game between the Bengals and the Bills.

Team	1	2	3	4	Total
Bills	0	10	0	0	10
• Bengals	7	7	0	7	21

- Location: Riverfront Stadium
- Game start: 12:30 p.m. EST
- Game attendance: 59,747
- Referee: Gene Barth
- TV announcers (NBC): Dick Enberg and Merlin Olsen

Scoring summary
Q1	CIN	Woods 1 yard run (Breech kick)	CIN 7–0
Q2	BUF	Reed 9-yard pass from Kelly (Norwood kick)	Tie 7–7
Q2	CIN	Brooks 10-yard pass from Esiason (Breech kick)	CIN 14–7
Q2	BUF	Norwood 39-yard field goal	CIN 14–10
Q4	CIN	Woods 1 yard run (Breech kick)	CIN 21–10

A stout defense that forced three interceptions while allowing just 45 rushing yards and 136 passing yards combined with a tremendous offense that held the ball for 39 minutes to deliver Cincinnati to the Super Bowl. Bills running back Thurman Thomas was held to just six yards on four carries, while quarterback Jim Kelly completed only 14-of-30 passes for 161 yards and 1 touchdown, with 3 interceptions. Just like their previous game, the Bengals didn't get much of a performance from NFL MVP Boomer Esiason, who completed only 11-of-20 passes for 94 yards, with one touchdown and two interceptions. But once again, their running game was able to pick up the slack, gaining 175 yards on the ground, with fullback Ickey Woods running for 102 yards and two touchdowns.

Cincinnati took a 7–0 lead in the first quarter after defensive back Eric Thomas' interception set up Woods' one-yard touchdown. Kelly led the Bills back with four consecutive completions, the last one a nine-yard touchdown pass to wide receiver Andre Reed. Then after forcing a punt, Buffalo drove to the Bengals 26-yard line, only to have Scott Norwood miss a 43-yard field goal attempt. Following another punt, Kelly was intercepted again, this time by defensive back Lewis Billups, and the Bengals capitalized with running back James Brooks' ten-yard touchdown reception from Esiason. Later on, Bills defensive back Mark Kelso intercepted a pass from Esiason and returned it 25 yards, setting up a 39-yard field goal by Norwood to cut the Bills deficit to 14–10 by halftime.

The Bengals took over the game in the second half, forcing Buffalo to start all of their drives from inside their own 23-yard line and holding them to 53 yards, two first downs, and zero points. Late in the third quarter, Bengals running back Stanley Wilson gained six yards on a fake punt attempt, and Cincinnati drove to score on Woods' second touchdown of the game, increasing their lead to 21–10. The Bills responded with a drive into Bengals territory, but safety David Fulcher picked off a desperate fourth down pass from Kelly in the end zone.

This was the last time the Bengals defeated the Bills until Week 4 of the 2011 season. The Bills would go on to win ten straight against them.

=== Super Bowl ===
Team	1	2	3	4	Total
Bengals	0	3	10	3	16
• 49ers	3	0	3	14	20

- Date: January 22
- Location: Joe Robbie Stadium
- TV announcers (NBC): Dick Enberg and Merlin Olsen

Scoring summary
Q1		SF	Cofer 41-yard field goal	SF 3–0
Q2		CIN	Breech 34-yard field goal	Tie 3–3
Q3		CIN	Breech 43-yard field goal	CIN 6–3
Q3		SF	Cofer 32-yard field goal	Tie 6–6
Q3		CIN	Jennings 93-yard kickoff return (Breech kick)	CIN 13–6
Q4		SF	Rice 14-yard pass from Montana (Cofer kick)	Tie 13–13
Q4		CIN	Breech 40-yard field goal	CIN 16–13
Q4	0:34	SF	Taylor 10-yard pass from Montana (Cofer kick)	SF 20–16

The game started out with devastating injuries on both sides. On the third play of the game, 49ers tackle Steve Wallace was taken off the field with a broken ankle. Later on, Bengals defensive lineman Tim Krumrie twisted his ankle nearly 180 degrees, shattering two bones in his left leg. Although it was reported at the time and widely believed that his foot caught in the grass, causing the break, a Cincinnati videographer had the best angle, and the breaks to Krumrie's leg occurred when San Francisco running back Roger Craig's knee smashed through both lower leg bones. Krumrie suffered two breaks in his tibia and another in his fibula.

After the two teams traded punts on their first drives of the game, the 49ers, aided by a roughing the passer penalty and a 17-yard screen pass to Tom Rathman on 3rd-and-10, marched 73 yards from their own 3-yard line to the Bengals 24. But dropped passes, including one by receiver Mike Wilson on the 2-yard line (the first time in a Super Bowl that instant replay was used to reverse a call), forced them to settle for a 41-yard field goal from kicker Mike Cofer.

On the 49ers next drive, Montana threw a pass to wide receiver Jerry Rice, who first tipped it to himself and then made a one-handed catch before stepping out of bounds at the San Francisco 45-yard line. Then after reaching the Cincinnati 42-yard line, Montana spotted defensive back Lewis Billups trying to cover Rice one-on-one and made him pay for it by completing a pass to the receiver at the 10. But two plays later on a third down play, Bengals safety David Fulcher made a touchdown saving tackle at the 2-yard line to keep full back Tom Rathman from scoring. Cofer then attempted a 19-yard field goal, but a poor snap from center Randy Cross (though NBC's Dick Enberg initially blamed backup guard Chuck Thomas; who lined up next to Cross) threw off the kicker's timing and his kick sailed wide left. It became the shortest missed field goal in Super Bowl history.

The 49ers then forced the Bengals to punt on their next drive. On the play, San Francisco Pro Bowl punt returner John Taylor misplayed punter Lee Johnson's kick, and it sailed over his head, bouncing all the way to the 49ers 9-yard line to make it a Super Bowl record 63-yard punt. But Taylor made up for his mistake by chasing the ball down and returning it for a Super Bowl record 45 yards to the Bengals 46-yard line. Thanks to Taylor, a seemingly routine punt had turned into a double record setter.

However, the 49ers were unable to take advantage of their excellent starting field position. On first down, running back Harry Sydney fumbled a pitch from Montana and was downed for a 10-yard loss after he dove on the ball. On the next play, Montana was sacked by defensive lineman David Grant. Then on third down, Fulcher forced a fumble from 49ers running back Roger Craig, and Bengals defensive end Jim Skow recovered the ball on his own 41-yard line. Cincinnati then drove to the San Francisco 42-yard line, but after 2 incomplete passes and defensive end Danny Stubbs's 8-yard sack on Bengals quarterback Boomer Esiason, they were forced to punt. However, Johnson pinned the 49ers back at their own 11-yard line with his punt. Then the Cincinnati defense limited the 49ers to just 1 yard on their ensuing drive, and ended up with great field position after defensive back Ray Horton returned San Francisco punter Barry Helton's 37-yard punt 5 yards to the 49ers 44-yard line

On their ensuing drive, the Bengals managed to get into scoring range by driving 28 yards to the San Francisco 16-yard line, assisted by an 18-yard completion from Esiason to receiver Tim McGee. But after Esiason's third down pass intended to wide receiver Eddie Brown was overthrown, they were forced to settle for kicker Jim Breech's 34-yard field goal with 1:15 left in the half.

The two teams went into their locker rooms tied 3 – 3, the first halftime tie in Super Bowl history, and the lowest halftime score since the Pittsburgh Steelers took a 2 – 0 halftime lead over the Minnesota Vikings in Super Bowl IX.

On their opening possession in the second half, the Bengals managed to get a sustained drive going, moving the ball 61 yards in 12 plays and taking 9:15 off the clock. Esiason, who completed only 4 of 12 passes for 48 yards in the first half, completed 3 of 4 passes for 54 yards on the drive, including a 20-yard completion to James Brooks and 23-yard and 11-yard completions to Cris Collinsworth, setting up a 43-yard field goal from Breech to give the Bengals their first lead of the game, 6–3. Cincinnati then forced San Francisco to punt, but on the first play of their next drive, 49ers rookie linebacker Bill Romanowski intercepted a pass from Esiason at the Bengals' 23-yard line. However, after a dropped pass by Jerry Rice, the 49ers offense could not get a first down, and they had to settle for Cofer's 32-yard field goal to tie the game.

With less than a minute left in the third quarter, it appeared that this would become the first Super Bowl ever to go 3 quarters without either team scoring a touchdown. But on the ensuing kickoff, Bengals kick returner Stanford Jennings returned the ball 93 yards for a touchdown to give the Bengals a 13 – 6 lead. Jennings would be the second player to return a kickoff for a touchdown in Super Bowl history. In four games played at Joe Robbie Stadium, each game had a kickoff return for a score, all by the eventual losing team.

But the 49ers immediately responded with a touchdown of their own, on an 85-yard, 4-play drive. First, Montana threw a short pass to Jerry Rice, who turned it into a 31-yard gain. Then the San Francisco quarterback completed a 40-yard pass to Craig on the first play of the 4th quarter, moving the ball to the Bengals 14-yard line. Montana's next pass was nearly intercepted but dropped by Billips in the endzone. Montana then threw a 14-yard touchdown pass to Rice, and the game was tied, 13 – 13.

Cofer's ensuing kickoff went out of bounds, giving the Bengals the ball at their own 35-yard line. But they could only reach the 43-yard line before being forced to punt. Taylor nearly turned the ball over by fumbling Johnson's punt, but his teammate Darryl Pollard recovered the ball at the San Francisco 18-yard line. On the first play of the ensuing drive, Montana completed a 44-yard pass to Rice, and then Craig ran for 7 yards, moving the ball to the Bengals 31-yard line. But after Craig was tackled for a 1-yard loss on the next play, Fulcher broke up a third down pass intended for Taylor, and then Cofer's ensuing 49-yard field attempt sailed wide right.

The Bengals took over from their own 32-yard line following the missed field goal, and retook the lead with a 10-play, 46-yard drive, featuring a 17-yard reception by backup receiver Ira Hillary on third down and 13, along with 21 yards on three carries from Ickey Woods and a 12-yard play-action sideline pass to James Brooks. At the end of the drive, Breech kicked a 40-yard field goal, giving the Bengals a 16–13 lead with 3:20 left in the game. The 49ers returned the ensuing kickoff to their own 15-yard line with 3:10 on the clock, but an illegal block penalty on the play pushed the ball back half the distance to the goal line to the 8.

Montana then led an 11-play, 92-yard drive to score the winning touchdown. In order to calm his teammates in the huddle just before the final game-winning drive, Montana pointed into the stadium crowd and said "Hey, isn't that John Candy?" The moment worked, and the 49ers were able to drive down the field for the win. It became the defining moment of Montana's "Joe Cool" reputation. Assuming that the Bengals would expect him to throw the ball near the sidelines (to enable the receivers to step out of bounds to immediately stop the clock), Montana first threw a pair of completions in the middle of the field, one to Craig and one to tight end John Frank. His next pass went 7 yards to Rice, which was then followed up by a pair of runs by Craig to reach their own 35-yard line. Montana then completed a 17-yard pass to Rice to advance the team to the Bengals 48-yard line, and followed it up with a 13-yard completion to Craig to move them to the 35-yard line.

But on the next play, Montana threw his first incomplete pass of the drive. After that, Cross committed an illegal man downfield penalty, which at the time was a 10-yard foul, moving the ball back to the 45-yard line and bringing up second down and 20 to go with just 1:15 left in the game. But Montana overcame the situation on the next play with a 27-yard completion to Rice, who caught the ball at the 33, evaded 3 Bengal defenders, and ran to the 18-yard line before Rickey Dixon managed to tackle him to prevent a touchdown. An 8-yard pass to Craig then advanced San Francisco to the 10-yard line. Then with 39 seconds left in the game, Montana finished the drive with a 10-yard touchdown pass to Taylor, giving the 49ers the lead for good. Finally, San Francisco's defense sealed the victory after Esiason's pass to Collinsworth was broken up as time expired.

== Team Leaders ==
=== Passing ===
Player	Att	Comp	Yds	TD	INT	Rating
Boomer Esiason	388	223	3572	28	14	97.4

=== Rushing ===
Player	Att	Yds	YPC	Long	TD
Ickey Woods	203	1066	5.3	56	15

=== Receiving ===
Player	Rec	Yds	Avg	Long	TD
Eddie Brown	53	1273	23.0	86	9

=== Defensive ===
Player	Tackles	Sacks	INTs	FF	FR
Tim Krumrie	152	3.0	0	4	3
Jim Skow	64	9.5	0	2	0
Eric Thomas	67	0	7	1	0

=== Kicking/Punting ===
Player	FGA	FGM	FG%	XPA	XPM	XP%	Points
Jim Breech	16	11	68.8%	59	56	94.9%	89

Player	Punts	Yards	Long	Blkd	Avg.
Scott Fulhage	44	1672	53	2	38.0

=== Special teams ===
Player	KR	KRYards	KRAvg	KRLong	KRTD	PR	PRYards	PRAvg	PRLong	PRTD
Stanford Jennings	32	684	21.4	98	1	0	0	0.0	0	0
Ira Hillary	12	195	16.3	24	0	17	166	9.8	20	0

== Awards and records ==
The most 100-yard rushing games in a Bengals season is seven, during the 12–4 season of 1988. Ickey Woods had five while James Brooks had two. Ickey Woods set the franchise record for most rushing yards in a postseason game when he rumbled for 126 yards in Cincinnati's 21–13 victory over Seattle in the AFC Divisional Playoffs (Dec. 31).

- Led NFL, 448 points scored
- Led NFL, 6,057 Total Yards Gained
- Led NFL, 2,710 Yards Rushing
- Eddie Brown, Franchise Record (since broken), Receiving Yards, 1,273 yards
- Eddie Brown, Franchise Record, Most Receiving Yards in One Game, 216 yards (achieved on November 6, 1988)
- Eddie Brown, Led AFC, Receiving Yards, 1,273 yards
- Boomer Esiason, NFL MVP
- Boomer Esiason, Led NFL, Passer Rating, 97.4 rating
- Boomer Esiason, Led AFC, Touchdown Passes, 28 TD Passes
- Ickey Woods, Led AFC (tied), Touchdowns, 15 TD's

=== Milestones ===
- Eddie Brown, 1st 1000-yard receiving season (1,273 yards)
- Ickey Woods, 1st 1000-yard rushing season (1,066 yards)

=== Pro Bowl Players ===
- RB James Brooks
- WR Eddie Brown
- QB Boomer Esiason
- S David Fulcher
- TE Rodney Holman
- NT Tim Krumrie
- G Max Montoya
- T Anthony Muñoz
- CB Eric Thomas
