= Ray Childress =

American football player (born 1962)

No. 79, 72
- Positions: Defensive tackle, defensive end

Personal information
- Born: October 20, 1962 (age 64); Memphis, Tennessee, U.S.
- Listed height: 6 ft 6 in (1.98 m)
- Listed weight: 272 lb (123 kg)

Career information
- High school: J. J. Pearce (Richardson, Texas)
- College: Texas A&M
- NFL draft: 1985: 1st round, 3rd overall pick

Career history
- Houston Oilers (1985–1995); Dallas Cowboys (1996)

Awards and highlights
- First-team All-Pro (1992); 4× Second-team All-Pro (1988–1990, 1993); 5× Pro Bowl (1988, 1990–1993); PFWA All-Rookie Team (1985); First-team All-American (1984); Second-team All-American (1983); 2× First-team All-SWC (1983, 1984); Texas Sports Hall of Fame

Career NFL statistics
- Tackles: 887
- Sacks: 76.5
- Forced fumbles: 19
- Stats at Pro Football Reference
- College Football Hall of Fame

Raymond Clay Childress Jr. (born October 20, 1962) is an American former professional football player who was a defensive tackle in the National Football League (NFL) for the Houston Oilers and Dallas Cowboys. He played college football for the Texas A&M Aggies.

== Early life ==
Childress attended J. J. Pearce High School in Richardson, Texas playing for Coach Hilton Lambeth, where he was an All-state defensive tackle. He accepted a football scholarship from Texas A&M University. He became a star as a freshman at defensive tackle.

As a junior, he posted 117 tackles, 15 quarterback sacks (school record) and was named second-team All-American by Gannett News Service (GNS).

As a senior, he anchored an Aggie defense that ranked No. 5 nationally in pass defense (127.5 yards per game). He recorded 124 tackles and 10 sacks. His 25 career sacks was then a school record for a non-linebacker and his 360 tackles then ranked fourth on A&M's career list. He was a first-team All-American selection by United Press International (UPI).

Childress ranks fifth all-time at the university in both career tackles and career sacks. In 1990, he was inducted into the Texas A&M Athletic Hall of Fame. In 2008, he was inducted into the Texas Sports Hall of Fame. In 2010, he was inducted into the College Football Hall of Fame.

== Professional career ==
=== Houston Oilers ===
Childress was considered one of the top prospects in the 1985 NFL draft and was in serious consideration for the first-overall selection; the Buffalo Bills, who held the pick, ultimately chose another defensive end, eventual Hall of Famer Bruce Smith. Childress slipped to third overall, where he was selected by the Houston Oilers.

He shares the NFL record for fumble recoveries in a single game, having recovered three from the Washington Redskins on October 30, 1988.

After five seasons as the Oilers' defensive end, Childress moved to defensive tackle in 1990 when defensive coordinator Jim Eddy switched from a 3-4 defense to a 4-3 scheme, necessitating an extra lineman. Childress was already a Pro Bowl end and had even filled in at nose guard on occasion. After the move, he would end up as a Pro Bowl selection in Hawaii four more times as a defensive tackle. As a testament to his excellence, four of the eight lowest single-season rushing totals allowed in Oilers history came between 1990 and 1993, with Childress at tackle.

Childress was as effective against the pass as he was against the run. He finished his Oiler career ranked second all-time in quarterback sacks and sixth all-time in tackles, joining Elvin Bethea as the only defensive linemen among the Oilers' top 10 in both categories. Childress led or shared the team sack lead from 1986 to 1989 and finished with the most single-season sacks for a defensive tackle (13) in 1992. For his 11-year career, Childress registered 13 multi-sack games.

He was known by his fans as not only as a star, but also as a blue-collar iron man. Until a separated shoulder ended his 1995 season (an injury that would thereafter be the determining factor in his decision to retire), he missed only 3 non-strike games due to injury, playing 154 games along the defensive line from 1985 to 1994. On February 15, 1996, he was released in a salary-cap move.

Childress had an incredible seven fumble recoveries in 1988, two shy of the NFL single-season record. Three of those came in the Oilers' memorable 41-17 whipping of the Redskins, broadcast on ESPN October 30, 1988. Childress was the foundation of a remarkable defensive unit that saw Houston make seven consecutive playoff appearances. During the prime of his career, he was considered by many to be the best defensive tackle in football.

=== Dallas Cowboys ===
On December 4, 1996, he was signed as a free agent by the Dallas Cowboys, to replace a suspended Leon Lett. He was a reserve player for three games behind Tony Casillas and Chad Hennings. He wasn't re-signed after the season.

== Philanthropy ==
Along with his wife, Kara, Childress established the Childress Foundation in Houston, Texas in 1992. The foundation provides programs to enhance student success, promote productive citizenship through community service, and develop effective life skills. Since its inception, the Childress Foundation has provided over $1.7 million in college scholarships and has benefited more than 1,300 students.

== Personal life ==
Following his 12-year career in the NFL, Childress was chairman and CEO for ten years of the Ray Childress Auto Group and a limited partner in the NFL franchise, Houston Texans. RCAG operated the Lawrence Marshall auto dealerships in Houston, Texas and the small town of Hempstead, Texas, approximately 50 miles (80 km) from Houston. Lawrence Marshall dealerships closed on February 4, 2009. The corporation closing can apparently be traced back to the national credit crunch when General Motors and Chrysler Corporation filed for bankruptcy. He also founded the Childress Directional Drilling, LLC. Childress has 4 children and resides in Houston, Texas and Jackson, Wyoming.

== Links ==
- Ray Childress at NFL.com
