= Ickey Woods =

American football player (born 1966)

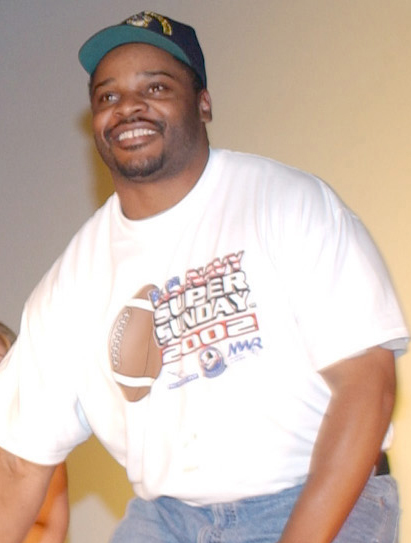
- Woods in 2002

No. 31, 30
- Position: Running back

Personal information
- Born: February 28, 1966 (age 60); Fresno, California, U.S.
- Listed height: 6 ft 2 in (1.88 m)
- Listed weight: 231 lb (105 kg)

Career information
- High school: Edison (Fresno)
- College: UNLV
- NFL draft: 1988: 2nd round, 31st overall pick

Career history
- Cincinnati Bengals (1988–1991)

Awards and highlights
- Second-team All-Pro (1988); PFWA NFL All-Rookie Team (1988); Cincinnati Bengals 40th Anniversary Team; PCAA Co-Offensive MVP (1987); First-team All-PCAA (1987)

Career NFL statistics
- Rushing yards: 1,525
- Rushing average: 4.6
- Rushing touchdowns: 27
- Stats at Pro Football Reference

Elbert L. "Ickey" Woods (born February 28, 1966) is an American former professional football player who was a running back for the Cincinnati Bengals of the National Football League (NFL) from 1988 through 1991. He played college football for the UNLV Rebels. He is best remembered for his "Ickey Shuffle" end zone dance, performed each time he scored a touchdown. After a rookie season in which he set numerous rookie franchise records, a series of injuries shortened his NFL career and he retired after four years.

== Early life ==
Woods was given the nickname "Ickey" based on his little brother's pronunciation of his given first name, which sounded like "E-E." He attended Edison High School in Fresno, California, where he played sports. He received one college football scholarship, from the University of Nevada, Las Vegas (UNLV), where he was a four-year letterwinner for the UNLV Rebels. As a freshman in 1984, the Rebels, led by future NFL quarterback Randall Cunningham, went 11–2 and won the California Bowl 30–13 against the Toledo Rockets, a game in which Woods rushed nine times for 53 yards and one touchdown.

In his senior year of 1987, Woods broke out and led the nation in rushing with 1,658 yards, with 6.4 yards per attempt. That total remains the second-most in UNLV history, and he holds the school record in single-game rushing attempts with 37 in two different games. In one of those games, he ran for a personal-best 265 yards against the University of the Pacific. He rushed for more than 100 yards in nine games, and more than 200 yards three times, in 1987, and was named first-team All Big West. He was inducted into the UNLV Athletic Hall of Fame in 1998.

== Professional career ==
Pre-draft measurables
Height	Weight	Hand span	40-yard dash	10-yard split	20-yard split	20-yard shuttle	Vertical jump	Broad jump	Bench press
6 ft 0 1/4 in (1.84 m)	231 lb (105 kg)	9 in (0.23 m)	4.54 s	1.65 s	2.63 s	4.38 s	31.5 in (0.80 m)	9 ft 8 in (2.95 m)	14 reps
All values from NFL Combine

The Cincinnati Bengals of the National Football League (NFL) drafted Woods in the second round (31st overall) of the 1988 NFL draft. He set franchise rookie records for rushing with 1,066 yards (later broken by Corey Dillon), 15 touchdowns, and an NFL-leading 5.3 yards per carry, along with 228 yards and three touchdowns in the playoffs as the Bengals advanced to Super Bowl XXIII. His team lost the game 20–16 to the San Francisco 49ers, but he finished as the game's leading rusher with 79 yards.

Woods tore his left anterior cruciate ligament (ACL) in the second game of the 1989 season, a 41–10 victory over the Pittsburgh Steelers. He missed 13 months. By the time he returned, his starting role was filled by Harold Green. In 1990, Woods had 64 rushes for 268 yards and six touchdowns to go with 20 receptions and 162 yards receiving. Woods injured his right knee in the 1991 preseason. He returned at midseason and ran for 97 yards on 36 carries. He was out of football by age 26. His career statistics include 332 carries for 1,525 yards and 27 touchdowns, along with 47 receptions for 397 yards. Woods was later named #7 on NFL Top 10's Top Ten One-Shot Wonders.

== NFL career statistics ==
Legend
**Bold**	Career high

=== Regular season ===
Year	Team	Games		Rushing					Receiving						Fumbles	
Year	Team	GP	GS	Att	Yds	Avg	Lng	TD	Tgt	Rec	Yds	Avg	Lng	TD	Fum	Lost
1988	CIN	16	10	**203**	**1,066**	**5.3**	**56**	**15**	23	**21**	**199**	6.9	**25**	0	**8**	**4**
1989	CIN	2	2	29	94	3.2	12	2	1	0	0	0	0	0	1	1
1990	CIN	10	6	64	268	4.2	32	6	**25**	20	162	**8.2**	22	0	1	1
1991	CIN	9	2	36	97	2.7	12	4	9	6	36	4.0	16	0	2	2
Career		37	20	332	1,525	4.6	56	27	58	47	397	8.4	25	0	12	8

=== Postseason ===
Year	Team	Games		Rushing					Receiving						Fumbles	
Year	Team	GP	GS	Att	Yds	Avg	Lng	TD	Tgt	Rec	Yds	Avg	Lng	TD	Fum	Lost
1988	CIN	3	3	**72**	**307**	4.3	**30**	**3**	1	0	0	0	0	0	0	0
1990	CIN	2	1	17	84	**4.9**	18	1	**3**	**3**	**18**	**6.0**	**9**	0	0	0
Career		5	4	89	391	4.4	30	4	4	3	18	6.0	9	0	0	0

=== Bengals franchise records ===
As of 2017's NFL offseason, Ickey Woods held at least 30 Bengals franchise records, including:

- Rush Attempts: playoffs (89), playoff season (72 in 1988), playoff game (29 on 1989-01-08 BUF)
- Rush Yards: playoffs (391), playoff season (307 in 1988)
- Rush Yds/Att: playoffs (4.39), rookie season (5.25 in 1988)
- Rushing TDs: season/rookie season (15 in 1988), playoffs (4), playoff season (3 in 1988), playoff game (2 on 1989-01-08 BUF)
- Rush Yds/Game: playoffs (78.2)
- Total TDs: playoffs (4), playoff season (3 in 1988), playoff game (2 on 1989-01-08 BUF), rookie season (15 in 1988)
- Yds from Scrimmage: playoffs (409), playoff season (307 in 1988)
- All Purpose Yds: playoffs (409), playoff season (307 in 1988)
- 100+ yard rushing games: season (7 in 1988, with Cedric Benson), playoffs (2), rookie season (7)
- Games with 1+ TD scored: playoffs (3), rookie season (11)
- Games with 2+ TD scored: season/rookie season (6 in 1988), playoff game (1; with Charles Alexander, Dan Ross, Stanley Wilson)
- Games with 3+ TD scored: rookie season (1; with three others)

== Personal life ==
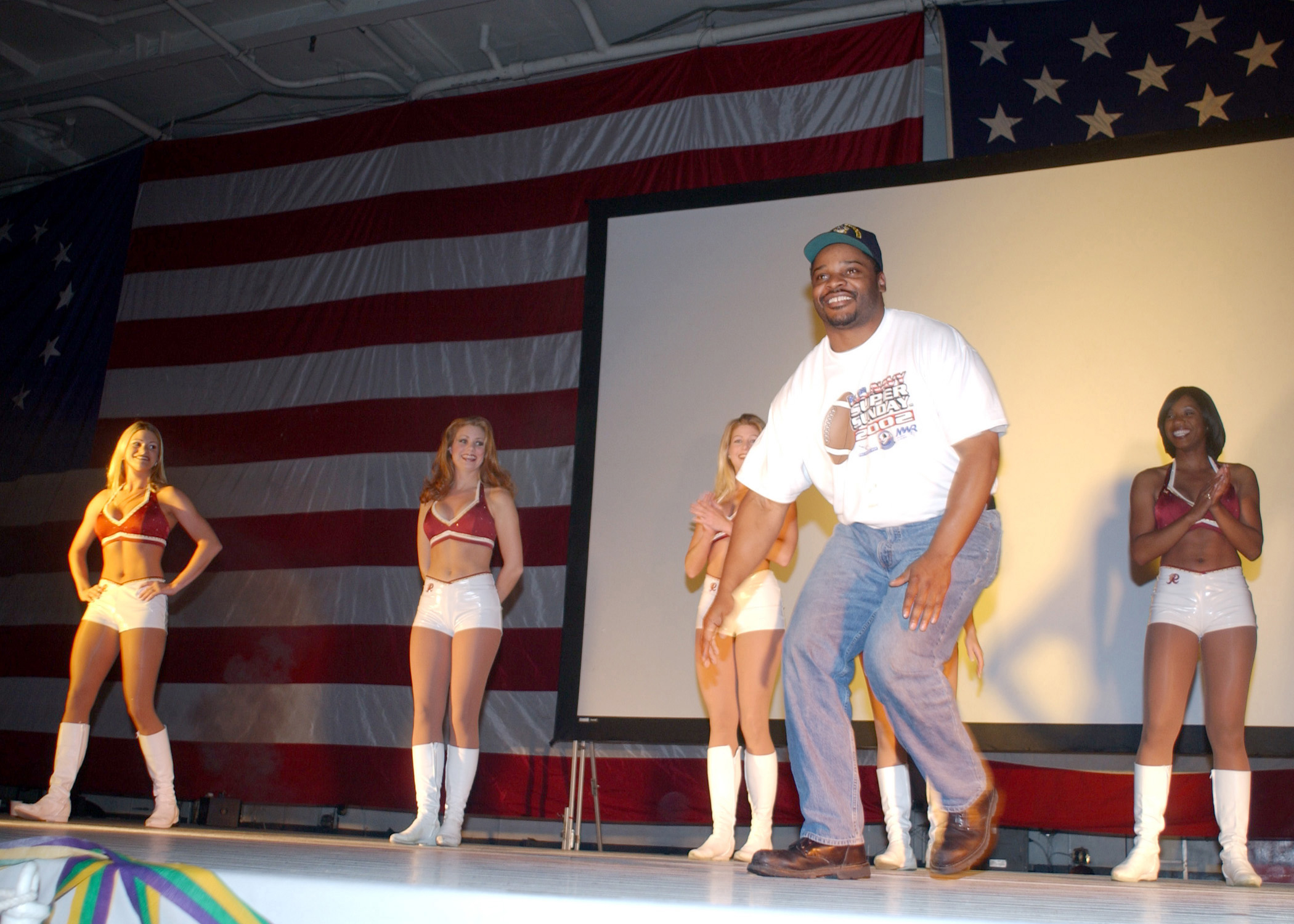
Woods at Super Bowl XXXVI pre-game show aboard USS George Washington (CVN-73).

Woods is the owner/coach of the Cincinnati Sizzle of the full-contact Women's Football Alliance; one of the players was his ex-wife, Chandra Baldwin-Woods. He runs the Ickey Woods Youth Foundation, as well as the Jovante Woods Foundation, named for their son who died at age 16. Jovante was an honor student and a member of the Princeton High School football team who suffered a fatal asthma attack at home. The foundation provides funding and education for asthma research and organ donor education. Woods has six children. Since retiring from the NFL, he has been a sales representative for a meat company, sold security systems, and owned a flooring store in Cincinnati. In 2006, he was an assistant coach for the Cincinnati Marshals of the National Indoor Football League.

Woods appeared in Bootsy Collins' video "Who-Dey Invasion." He appeared in a Cincinnati Bell commercial, doing the "Ickey Shuffle" with the company's president and was in a national Oldsmobile commercial doing the "Ickey Shuffle" with his mother. In 2014, he was featured in a national GEICO Insurance commercial in which he reprised his "Ickey Shuffle" while buying cold cuts at a deli counter. On May 1, 2015, Woods announced at the Auditorium Theatre in Chicago, Illinois that the Cincinnati Bengals had selected offensive tackle Jake Fisher of the University of Oregon as the 21st pick in the second round (53rd overall) of the 2015 NFL draft. After replicating his signature move, the "Ickey Shuffle" and making the pick announcement, Woods said, "gonna get me some cold cuts," a line from the aforementioned GEICO television commercial. He also appeared in a couple of commercials before Super Bowl XLIX. The dance move is occasionally duplicated by other NFL players.
