= 1988 All-Pro Team =

Official list of the best NFL players in 1988

The 1988 All-Pro Team is composed of the National Football League players that were named to the Associated Press, Newspaper Enterprise Association, Pro Football Writers Association, Pro Football Weekly, and The Sporting News All-Pro Teams in 1988. Both first- and second- teams are listed for the AP and NEA teams. These are the five teams that are included in Total Football II: The Official Encyclopedia of the National Football League. In 1988, the Associated Press did not choose a kick returner.

== Teams ==
Offense
Position	First team	Second team
Quarterback	Boomer Esiason, Cincinnati Bengals (AP, NEA, PFWA, PFW, TSN)	Randall Cunningham, Philadelphia Eagles (AP-2); Dan Marino, Miami Dolphins (NEA-2)
Running back	Eric Dickerson, Indianapolis Colts (AP, NEA, PFWA, PFW, TSN); Roger Craig, San Francisco 49ers (AP, NEA, PFWA, PFW, TSN)	Herschel Walker, Dallas Cowboys (AP-2, NEA-2); Ickey Woods, Cincinnati Bengals (AP-2, NEA-2)
Wide receiver	Henry Ellard, Los Angeles Rams (AP, NEA, PFWA, PFW, TSN); Jerry Rice, San Francisco 49ers (AP, PFWA, PFW, TSN); Eddie Brown, Cincinnati Bengals (NEA)	Jerry Rice, San Francisco 49ers (NEA-2); Eddie Brown, Cincinnati Bengals (AP-2); Al Toon, New York Jets (AP-2, NEA-2)
Tight end	Keith Jackson, Philadelphia Eagles (AP, PFWA, PFW, TSN); Mickey Shuler, New York Jets (NEA)	Keith Jackson, Philadelphia Eagles (NEA-2); Mickey Shuler, New York Jets (AP-2)
Tackle	Anthony Muñoz, Cincinnati Bengals (AP, NEA, PFWA, PFW, TSN); Gary Zimmerman, Minnesota Vikings (AP, PFWA); Jackie Slater, Los Angeles Rams (PFW); Irv Pankey, Los Angeles Rams (NEA); Bruce Armstrong, New England Patriots (TSN)	Luis Sharpe, Phoenix Cardinals (AP-2); Chris Hinton, Indianapolis Colts (NEA-2); Bruce Armstrong, New England Patriots (AP-2); Gary Zimmerman, Minnesota Vikings (NEA-2)
Guard	Bruce Matthews, Houston Oilers (AP, PFWA, PFW, TSN); Tom Newberry, Los Angeles Rams (AP, PFWA, PFW, TSN); Mike Munchak, Houston Oilers (NEA); Bill Fralic, Atlanta Falcons (NEA)	Max Montoya, Cincinnati Bengals (NEA-2); Bruce Matthews, Houston Oilers (NEA-2); Mike Munchak, Houston Oilers (AP-2); Bill Fralic, Atlanta Falcons (AP-2)
Center	Jay Hilgenberg, Chicago Bears (AP, NEA, PFWA, PFW, TSN)	Ray Donaldson, Indianapolis Colts (NEA-2); Kent Hull, Buffalo Bills (AP-2)

Special teams
Position	First team	Second team
Kicker	Scott Norwood, Buffalo Bills (AP, PFWA, PFW); Nick Lowery, Kansas City Chiefs (NEA); Dean Biasucci, Indianapolis Colts (TSN)	Morten Andersen, New Orleans Saints (NEA-2); Dean Biasucci, Indianapolis Colts (AP-2)
Punter	Jim Arnold, Detroit (NEA, PFW); Mike Horan, Denver Broncos (AP, PFWA, TSN)	Jim Arnold, Detroit (AP-2); Mike Horan, Denver Broncos (NEA-2)
Kick Returner	Tim Brown, Los Angeles Raiders (PFWA, PFW, TSN)	
Punt Returner	John Taylor, San Francisco 49ers (PFWA, PFW, TSN)	
Special Teams	Eugene Seale, Houston Oilers (PFW)	

Defense
Position	First team	Second team
Defensive end	Bruce Smith, Buffalo Bills (AP, NEA, PFWA, PFW, TSN); Reggie White, Philadelphia Eagles (AP, NEA, PFWA, PFW, TSN)	Ray Childress, Houston Oilers (AP-2, NEA-2); Richard Dent, Chicago Bears (AP-2, NEA-2)
Defensive tackle	Keith Millard, Minnesota Vikings (AP, PFWA, TSN); Tim Krumrie, Cincinnati Bengals (AP, PFWA, PFW, TSN); Dan Hampton, Chicago Bears (NEA, PFW); Michael Carter, San Francisco 49ers (NEA)	Steve McMichael, Chicago Bears (NEA-2); Keith Millard, Minnesota Vikings (NEA-2); Michael Carter, San Francisco 49ers (AP-2); Dan Hampton, Chicago Bears (AP-2)
Middle linebacker	Mike Singletary, Chicago Bears (AP, NEA, PFWA, PFW, TSN); Shane Conlan, Buffalo Bills (PFWA, PFW, TSN); Vaughan Johnson, New Orleans Saints (NEA)	John Offerdahl, Miami Dolphins (NEA-2); Scott Studwell, Minnesota Vikings (NEA-2); Shane Conlan, Buffalo Bills (AP-2)
Outside linebacker	Lawrence Taylor, New York Giants (AP, PFWA, PFW, TSN); Cornelius Bennett, Buffalo Bills (AP, NEA, PFWA, PFW, TSN); Tim Harris, Green Bay Packers (NEA)	Andre Tippett, New England Patriots (AP-2, NEA-2); Lawrence Taylor, New York Giants (NEA-2); Tim Harris, Green Bay Packers (AP-2)
Cornerback	Carl Lee, Minnesota Vikings (AP, PFWA, PFW, TSN); Frank Minnifield, Cleveland Browns (AP, NEA, PFWA, PFW, TSN); Ronnie Lippett, New England Patriots (NEA)	Carl Lee, Minnesota Vikings (NEA-2); Jerry Gray, Los Angeles Rams (NEA-2); Scott Case, Atlanta Falcons (AP-2); Hanford Dixon, Cleveland Browns (AP-2)
Safety	Deron Cherry, Kansas City Chiefs (AP, PFWA, PFW, TSN); Joey Browner, Minnesota Vikings (AP, NEA, PFWA, PFW, TSN); Ronnie Lott, San Francisco 49ers (NEA)	Ronnie Lott, San Francisco 49ers (AP-2); Bennie Blades, Detroit Lions (NEA-2); Deron Cherry, Kansas City Chiefs (NEA-2); David Fulcher, Cincinnati Bengals (AP-2)

== Key ==
- AP = Associated Press first-team All-Pro
- AP-2 = Associated Press second-team All-Pro
- NEA = Newspaper Enterprise Association first-team All-Pro team
- NEA-2 = Newspaper Enterprise Association second-team All-Pro team
- PFW = Pro Football Weekly All-Pro team
- PFWA = Pro Football Writers Association All-NFL
- TSN = The Sporting News All-Pro
