= Luis Sharpe =

Cuban gridiron football player (1960–2025)

No. 67
- Position: Offensive tackle

Personal information
- Born: June 16, 1960; Havana, Cuba
- Died: July 11, 2025 (aged 65); Michigan, U.S.
- Listed height: 6 ft 5 in (1.96 m)
- Listed weight: 295 lb (134 kg)

Career information
- High school: Southwestern (Detroit, Michigan, U.S.)
- College: UCLA
- NFL draft: 1982: 1st round, 16th overall pick

Career history
- St. Louis Cardinals (1982–1985); Memphis Showboats (1985); St. Louis / Phoenix / Arizona Cardinals (1986–1994)

Awards and highlights
- 2× Second-team All-Pro (1988, 1990); 3× Pro Bowl (1987–1989); PFWA All-Rookie Team (1982); First-team All-Pac-10 (1981)

Career NFL statistics
- Games played: 189
- Games started: 189
- Fumble recoveries: 6
- Stats at Pro Football Reference

Luis Ernesto Sharpe Jr. (June 16, 1960 – July 11, 2025) was a Cuban professional player of American football who was an offensive tackle for 13 seasons with the St. Louis/Phoenix/Arizona Cardinals of the National Football League (NFL) from 1982 through 1994. He was a three-time Pro Bowl selection with the Cardinals. He also played a single season in the United States Football League (USFL).

== Early life ==
Born in Havana, Cuba, Sharpe immigrated with his family to Detroit, Michigan, in the United States when he was six.

== College career ==
Sharpe played college football for the UCLA Bruins. As a freshman in 1978 he was one of three Bruins to win the John F. Boncheff, Jr., Memorial Trophy for Rookie of the Year. Sharpe majored in political science at the University of California, Los Angeles. He left in the spring semester of 1982, 16 units short of a degree. He never graduated.

== Professional career ==
Sharpe was selected by the Cardinals in the first round (16th overall) of the 1982 NFL draft.

== Personal life and death ==
Sharpe was a Cuban citizen. He battled substance abuse during his NFL career and after. He was sentenced to prison after his football career, before being clean for the final eight years of his life.

On July 11, 2025, Sharpe died from heart failure at the age of 65. He was interred at Glen Eden Lutheran Memorial Park.
