= 1989 Pro Bowl =

National Football League all-star game

1989 NFL Pro Bowl
AFC	NFC
3	34
Head coach: Marv Levy (Buffalo Bills)	Head coach: Mike Ditka (Chicago Bears)
	1	2	3	4	Total
AFC	3	0	0	0	3
NFC	7	7	10	10	34
- Date: January 29, 1989
- Stadium: Aloha Stadium; Honolulu, Hawaii
- MVP: Randall Cunningham (Philadelphia Eagles)
- Referee: Ben Dreith
- Attendance: 50,113

TV in the United States
- Network: ESPN
- Announcers: Mike Patrick & Joe Theismann

The 1989 Pro Bowl was the NFL's 39th annual all-star game which featured the outstanding performers from the 1988 season. The game was played on Sunday, January 29, 1989, at Aloha Stadium in Honolulu, Hawaii before a crowd of 50,113. The final score was NFC 34, AFC 3.

Marv Levy of the Buffalo Bills led the AFC team against an NFC team coached by Chicago Bears head coach Mike Ditka. The referee was Ben Dreith.

Randall Cunningham of the Philadelphia Eagles was named the game's MVP. Players on the winning NFC team received $10,000 apiece while the AFC participants each took home $5,000.

It was the last Pro Bowl game played in January for two decades, until the 2010 Pro Bowl.

== AFC roster ==
=== Offense ===
Position	Starter(s)	Reserve(s)
Quarterback	7 Boomer Esiason, Cincinnati	1 Warren Moon, Houston; 7 Jim Kelly, Buffalo; 19 Dave Krieg, Seattle
Running back	29 Eric Dickerson, Indianapolis	29 John Stephens, New England; 28 James Brooks, Cincinnati
Fullback	30 Mike Rozier, Houston	
Wide receiver	88 Al Toon, N.Y. Jets; 88 Eddie Brown, Cincinnati	83 Andre Reed, Buffalo; 81 Tim Brown, L.A. Raiders; 81 Mark Clayton, Miami
Tight end	82 Mickey Shuler, N.Y. Jets	82 Rodney Holman, Cincinnati
Offensive tackle	78 Anthony Muñoz, Cincinnati; 75 Chris Hinton, Indianapolis	62 Tunch Ilkin, Pittsburgh
Offensive guard	74 Bruce Matthews, Houston; 65 Max Montoya, Cincinnati	65 Mike Munchak, Houston
Center	53 Ray Donaldson, Indianapolis	67 Kent Hull, Buffalo

=== Defense ===
Position	Starter(s)	Reserve(s)
Defensive end	99 Lee Williams, San Diego; 78 Bruce Smith, Buffalo	79 Jacob Green, Seattle
Defensive tackle	76 Fred Smerlas, Buffalo	69 Tim Krumrie, Cincinnati; 79 Ray Childress, Houston; 70 Brian Sochia, Miami
Outside linebacker	56 Andre Tippett, New England; 55 Cornelius Bennett, Buffalo	57 Clay Matthews Jr., Cleveland; 59 John Grimsley, Houston
Inside linebacker	52 Johnny Rembert, New England; 55 Matt Millen, L.A. Raiders	56 Dino Hackett, Kansas City; 58 Shane Conlan, Buffalo
Cornerback	31 Frank Minnifield, Cleveland; 29 Hanford Dixon, Cleveland	22 Eric Thomas, Cincinnati; 29 Albert Lewis, Kansas City
Free safety	20 Deron Cherry, Kansas City	22 Erik McMillan, N.Y. Jets
Strong safety	33 David Fulcher, Cincinnati	

=== Special teams ===
Position	Starter(s)	Reserve(s)
Punter	2 Mike Horan, Denver	
Placekicker	11 Scott Norwood, Buffalo	
Kick returner	89 Gerald McNeil, Cleveland	
Special Teamer	97 Rufus Porter, Seattle	

== NFC roster ==
The players representing the NFC were:

=== Offense ===
Position	Starter(s)	Reserve(s)
Quarterback	12 Randall Cunningham, Philadelphia	11 Wade Wilson, Minnesota
Running back	34 Herschel Walker, Dallas	33 Roger Craig, San Francisco; 35 Neal Anderson, Chicago; 24 Ron Wolfley, Phoenix
Fullback	44 John Settle, Atlanta	
Wide receiver	80 Henry Ellard, Los Angeles Rams; 80 Jerry Rice, San Francisco	81 Anthony Carter, Minnesota; 84 Eric Martin, New Orleans; 80 J.T. Smith, Phoenix
Tight end	83 Keith Jackson, Philadelphia	83 Steve Jordan, Minnesota
Offensive tackle	65 Gary Zimmerman, Minnesota; 78 Jackie Slater, Los Angeles Rams	67 Luis Sharpe, Phoenix; 85 Hoby Brenner, New Orleans
Offensive guard	73 Mark May, Washington; 66 Tom Newberry, Los Angeles Rams	62 Mark Bortz, Chicago; 79 Bill Fralic, Atlanta
Center	63 Jay Hilgenberg, Chicago	56 Doug Smith, Los Angeles Rams

=== Defense ===
Position	Starter(s)	Reserve(s)
Defensive end	92 Reggie White, Philadelphia; 56 Chris Doleman, Minnesota	71 Charles Mann, Washington
Defensive tackle	75 Keith Millard, Minnesota	95 Michael Carter, San Francisco
Outside linebacker	55 Mike Cofer, Detroit; 56 Lawrence Taylor, N. Y. Giants	94 Charles Haley, San Francisco
Inside linebacker	50 Mike Singletary, Chicago; 51 Sam Mills, New Orleans	55 Scott Studwell, Minnesota
Cornerback	25 Jerry Gray, L. A. Rams; 39 Carl Lee, Minnesota	25 Scott Case, Atlanta
Free safety	42 Ronnie Lott, San Francisco	43 Terry Kinard, N. Y. Giants
Strong safety	47 Joey Browner, Minnesota	22 Dave Duerson, Chicago

=== Special teams ===
Position	Starter(s)	Reserve(s)
Punter	5 Jim Arnold, Detroit	
Placekicker	7 Morten Andersen, New Orleans Saints	
Kick returner	82 John Taylor, San Francisco	
