= Carl Lee (American football) =

American football player and coach (born 1961)

No. 39
- Position: Cornerback

Personal information
- Born: February 6, 1961 (age 65); South Charleston, West Virginia, U.S.
- Listed height: 5 ft 11 in (1.80 m)
- Listed weight: 185 lb (84 kg)

Career information
- High school: South Charleston
- College: Marshall (1979–1982)
- NFL draft: 1983: 7th round, 186th overall pick

Career history

Playing
- Minnesota Vikings (1983–1993); New Orleans Saints (1994)

Coaching
- West Virginia State (1996–2005) Head coach; South Charleston (2022) Head coach

Awards and highlights
- As a player: First-team All-Pro (1988); 3× Pro Bowl (1988–1990); 50 Greatest Vikings; Minnesota Vikings 40th Anniversary Team; Minnesota Vikings All-Mall of America Field Team

Career NFL statistics
- Interceptions: 31
- Interception yards: 352
- Total tackles: 803
- Fumble recoveries: 7
- Total touchdowns: 2
- Stats at Pro Football Reference

Head coaching record
- Career: College: 34–75 (.312)

Carl Lee III (born February 6, 1961) is an American former professional football player who was a cornerback in the National Football League (NFL). He was selected by the Minnesota Vikings in the seventh round of the 1983 NFL draft, and played with the Vikings for all but his final season with the New Orleans Saints. From 1996 to 2005, Lee was the head football coach at West Virginia State and compiled an overall record of 34 wins and 75 losses (34–75) during his time with the Yellow Jackets.

He played college football for the Marshall Thundering Herd. In 1995, he was inducted into the Marshall University Athletics Hall of Fame for his collegiate career in football and track and field.

== Professional career ==
=== Minnesota Vikings ===
Lee was selected by the Minnesota Vikings in the seventh round of the 1983 NFL draft. He played 11 years for the team from 1983 to 1993. During that time he started 144 of 169 games and had 779 tackles, 31 interceptions, returning two for touchdowns. He made the Pro Bowl in 1988, 1989, 1990.

=== New Orleans Saints ===
In 1994, Lee joined the New Orleans Saints. In his only year with the team he started eight of 12 games, recording 28 tackles and two interceptions.

After the 1994 season, Lee retired after 12 years in the NFL. He finished his career starting 152 of 181 games, recording 799 tackles, 31 interceptions, two touchdowns, and seven fumble recoveries.

== Coaching career ==
Following his retirement from the NFL, in January 1996, Lee accepted the head coaching position at West Virginia State University. After the 2005 season, he resigned his position as head coach, and during his ten seasons with the Yellow Jackets, Lee compiled an overall record of 34 wins and 75 losses (34–75).

On February 17, 2022, it was announced that Lee would become the head football coach for South Charleston High School, his alma mater. On February 5, 2023, it was announced that Lee resigned as head football coach of South Charleston.

== Head coaching record ==
Year	Team	Overall	Conference	Standing	Bowl/playoffs
West Virginia State Yellow Jackets (West Virginia Intercollegiate Athletic Conference) (1996–2005)
1996	West Virginia State	4–7	3–4	4th	
1997	West Virginia State	5–6	3–4	T–4th	
1998	West Virginia State	3–8	2–5	7th	
1999	West Virginia State	5–5	2–4	T–4th	
2000	West Virginia State	4–7	3–4	T–4th	
2001	West Virginia State	4–7	2–5	7th	
2002	West Virginia State	1–10	0–7	8th	
2003	West Virginia State	3–8	3–4	T–4th	
2004	West Virginia State	3–8	2–5	T–6th	
2005	West Virginia State	2–9	2–6	T–7th	
West Virginia State:		34–75	22–48		
Total:		34–75			
