= Max Montoya =

American football player (born 1956)

No. 65
- Position: Guard

Personal information
- Born: May 12, 1956 (age 70); Montebello, California, U.S.
- Listed height: 6 ft 5 in (1.96 m)
- Listed weight: 282 lb (128 kg)

Career information
- High school: La Puente (La Puente, California)
- College: Mt. San Antonio (1974–1975); UCLA (1976–1978)
- NFL draft: 1979: 7th round, 168th overall pick

Career history
- Cincinnati Bengals (1979–1989); Los Angeles Raiders (1990–1994)

Awards and highlights
- 2× Second-team All-Pro (1988, 1989); 4× Pro Bowl (1986, 1988, 1989, 1993); Cincinnati Bengals 40th Anniversary Team; Cincinnati Bengals 50th Anniversary Team; Second-team All-Pac-10 (1978)

Career NFL statistics
- Games played: 223
- Games started: 195
- Fumble recoveries: 3
- Stats at Pro Football Reference

Max Montoya Jr. (born May 12, 1956) is an American former professional football player who was a guard for 16 seasons in the National Football League (NFL), primarily with the Cincinnati Bengals. He played college football for the UCLA Bruins and was selected by the Bengals in the seventh round of the 1979 NFL draft. He also played for the Los Angeles Raiders.

== Early life ==
Montoya who is of Mexican–American descent, attended La Puente High School in La Puente, California. He was unable to play football or basketball his senior season due to a heart murmur.

== College career ==
Montoya was cleared to play football again, and began his college football career playing for Mt. San Antonio College, a community college in Walnut, California. He did not start as a freshman, but after an outstanding sophomore season, he earned a football scholarship to play for the UCLA Bruins, where he played under head coach Terry Donahue. After redshirting for a year, Montoya was a starter in 1977 as the Bruins posted a 7–4 record. In 1978, he was again a starter, earning second-team all-Pac-10 honors. The Bruins in 1978 went 8–3–1, ended the season as no. 14 in the AP poll and no. 12 in coaches poll, and played to a 10–10 tie versus the Arkansas Razorbacks in the 1978 Fiesta Bowl.

== Professional career ==
Montoya was selected by the Cincinnati Bengals in the seventh round with the 168th overall pick of the 1979 NFL draft. He was a four-time Pro Bowler, playing in two Super Bowls with the Bengals. He played 11 seasons for them, from 1979 to 1989, becoming a starter in his second season. He then played five seasons for the Los Angeles Raiders, starting in all but his final season.

== Personal life ==
After retiring from the NFL, Montoya invested in a restaurant franchise of Cincinnati-based Penn Station East Coast Subs and eventually owned four in northern Kentucky. He is also a founder and silent partner of Montoya's Restaurant in Fort Mitchell, Kentucky. He also spent five years helping coach the Beechwood High School football team (including son Matthew, now a multimedia freelancer) in Fort Mitchell, Kentucky. His daughter, Alison Montoya (a twin of Matthew), is a general assignment reporter and anchor for Cincinnati FOX affiliate WXIX after previously working for WLWT.

Montoya is now semi-retired and lives with his wife, Patty, on a farm in Hebron, Kentucky, where he raises horses.
