= Eddie Brown (wide receiver) =

American football player (born 1962)

No. 81
- Position: Wide receiver

Personal information
- Born: December 18, 1962 (age 63); Miami, Florida, U.S.
- Listed height: 6 ft 0 in (1.83 m)
- Listed weight: 185 lb (84 kg)

Career information
- High school: Miami
- College: Miami (FL)
- NFL draft: 1985: 1st round, 13th overall pick

Career history
- Cincinnati Bengals (1985–1991)

Awards and highlights
- NFL Offensive Rookie of the Year (1985); Second-team All-Pro (1988); Pro Bowl (1988); PFWA All-Rookie Team (1985); National champion (1983); Consensus All-American (1984)

Career NFL statistics
- Receptions: 363
- Receiving yards: 6,134
- Receiving touchdowns: 41
- Stats at Pro Football Reference

Eddie Lee Brown (born December 18, 1962) is an American former professional football player who was a wide receiver in the National Football League (NFL) for the Cincinnati Bengals from 1985 to 1991. He played college football for the Miami Hurricanes.

== College career ==
Brown was part of the 1983 Miami Hurricanes football team that upset Nebraska in the 1984 Orange Bowl to earn Miami's first national championship. The following year, Brown was a consensus first-team All-American and was the first wide receiver in UM history to amass over 1,000 yards receiving, with 220 of those yards (on 10 catches) coming in the famous "Hail Flutie" shootout with Boston College. Brown would leave Miami with school career records for receptions, receiving yards and receiving touchdowns.

== Professional career ==
In the 1985 NFL draft, Brown was the second receiver selected (after Al Toon) and the 13th pick overall by the Cincinnati Bengals, three picks ahead of Jerry Rice. In 1985, he won the NFL Rookie of the Year Award with 53 receptions for 942 yards and eight touchdowns.

In 1988, Brown caught 53 passes for 1,273 yards and nine touchdowns, topping the high-powered Bengals offense in yards and leading the Bengals to the 1988 AFC Championship and Super Bowl XXIII. The season earned Brown his only trip to the Pro Bowl. His 1,273 receiving yards was a franchise record, and his 24 yards per catch average is an NFL single-season record that still stands for receivers with 50+ receptions.

Brown's team record for receiving yards was later surpassed by Chad Johnson's 1,355 yards in 2003, but it took Johnson 37 more receptions than Brown (90) to reach this mark. Brown also set a franchise record for most receiving yards in a single game (216) in the 1988 season, which stood until surpassed by Johnson's 260 receiving yards in a game during the 2006 season.

Brown caught a career-high 59 passes in what would be his final NFL season in 1991. A ruptured disc in his neck was discovered early in Bengals training camp in 1992. He underwent surgery and missed the season. In 1993, he was granted free agency but eventually returned to Cincinnati after experiencing a slow market for his services. He was released during the final preseason cuts in 1993 and never played again.

He finished his seven-year NFL career with 363 catches (seventh in Bengals history) for 6,134 yards (fifth) and 41 touchdowns (fourth), along with 164 rushing yards.

== NFL career statistics ==
Legend
	Won the NFL championship
	Led the league
**Bold**	Career high

=== Regular season ===
Year	Team	Games		Receiving				
Year	Team	GP	GS	Rec	Yds	Avg	Lng	TD
1985	CIN	16	16	53	942	17.8	68	8
1986	CIN	16	16	58	964	16.6	57	4
1987	CIN	12	12	44	608	13.8	47	3
1988	CIN	16	16	53	**1,273**	**24.0**	**86**	**9**
1989	CIN	15	15	52	814	15.7	46	6
1990	CIN	14	12	44	706	16.0	50	**9**
1991	CIN	13	12	**59**	827	14.0	53	2
Career		102	99	363	6,134	16.9	86	41

== Other information ==
Eddie Brown is notable for claiming workers compensation benefits in California, for games he played in California while he played for Cincinnati. California declined to grant Brown worker's compensation benefits because Brown was only playing in California temporarily. Brown v. Cincinnati Bengals, 2013 Cal. Wrk. Comp. P.D. LEXIS 353.
