= Tim Krumrie =

American football player and coach (born 1960)

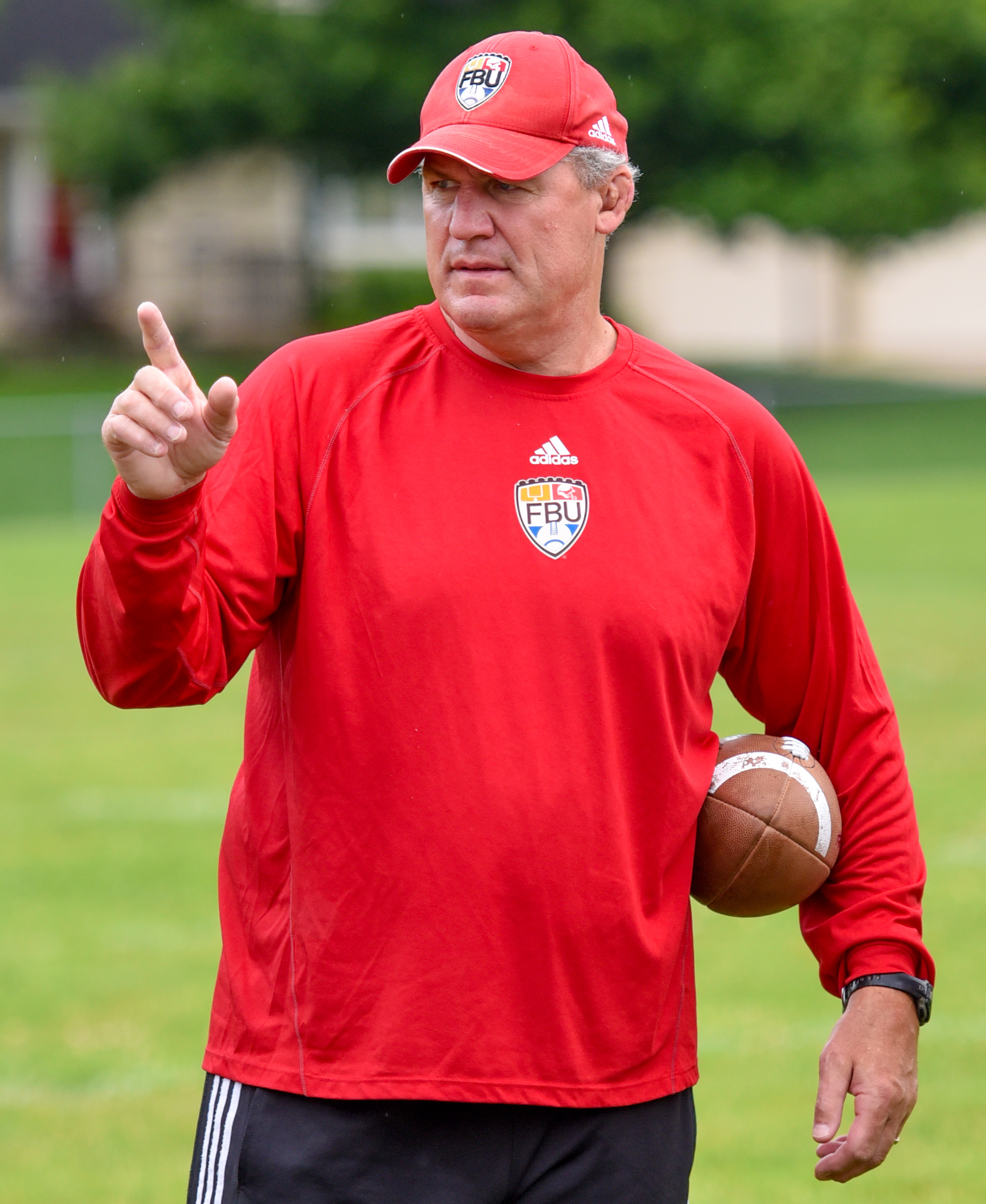
- Krumrie in 2015

No. 69
- Position: Nose tackle

Personal information
- Born: May 20, 1960 (age 66); Menomonie, Wisconsin, U.S.
- Listed height: 6 ft 2 in (1.88 m)
- Listed weight: 270 lb (122 kg)

Career information
- High school: Mondovi (Mondovi, Wisconsin)
- College: Wisconsin (1979–1982)
- NFL draft: 1983: 10th round, 276th overall pick

Career history

Playing
- Cincinnati Bengals (1983–1994)

Coaching
- Cincinnati Bengals (1995–2002) Defensive line coach; Buffalo Bills (2003–2005) Defensive line coach; Kansas City Chiefs (2006–2009) Defensive line coach; Hartford Colonials (2011) Defensive line coach

Awards and highlights
- First-team All-Pro (1988); Second-team All-Pro (1987); 2× Pro Bowl (1987, 1988); George Halas Award (1990); Cincinnati Bengals Ring of Honor; Cincinnati Bengals 40th Anniversary Team; Cincinnati Bengals 50th Anniversary Team; Consensus All-American (1981); 3× First-team All-Big Ten (1980–1982)

Career NFL statistics
- Tackles: 1,017
- Sacks: 34.5
- Forced fumbles: 3
- Fumble recoveries: 13
- Stats at Pro Football Reference
- College Football Hall of Fame

Timothy Alan Krumrie (born May 20, 1960) is an American former professional football player who spent his entire 12-year career as a nose tackle for the Cincinnati Bengals of the National Football League (NFL) from 1983 through 1994. He played college football for the Wisconsin Badgers.

== Early life ==
Krumrie was raised on a dairy farm outside of Mondovi, Wisconsin. He played football at Mondovi High School. Also a standout wrestler for the Buffaloes, Krumrie won the heavyweight state title in 1979, the last year all schools were combined in one division.

Each year since 2009, the Tim Krumrie Award is given to the outstanding high school senior defensive lineman in Wisconsin. The award is given by the Wisconsin Sports Network and WisSports.net.

== College career ==
Krumrie attended the University of Wisconsin-Madison, who recruited him as an inside linebacker but switched him to nose tackle. He led the Badgers in tackles all four years he played, and was a three-time All-Big Ten selection. He was the school's all-time leading tackler at the time of his graduation, and currently is third. He still holds the record for most solo tackles in a career at 276.

He was named defensive MVP of the Badgers' 1982 Independence Bowl win over Kansas State. A member of the Wisconsin wrestling team in 1979 and 1980, he finished fifth at the Big Ten Championships as a sophomore heavyweight.

Krumrie was enshrined in the University of Wisconsin Hall of Fame in 1999. He was inducted into the College Football Hall of Fame in 2016.

== Professional career ==
Krumrie was chosen in the 10th round of the 1983 NFL draft.

Krumrie was selected to the Pro Bowl twice, in 1987 and 1988, and made one Super Bowl appearance.

He finished his career with 34 sacks and 13 fumble recoveries for 35 return yards in 188 games. At the time of his retirement, his 34 sacks were the fourth highest in franchise history.

Krumrie is perhaps remembered most for the severely broken leg he suffered during Super Bowl XXIII where the Bengals played the San Francisco 49ers. As Krumrie came off a block from 49er offensive linemen Jesse Sapolu and Randy Cross, he went to make a tackle on ball carrier Roger Craig. When his foot was planted in the ground, the pressure his weight put on his ankle joint caused his lower leg to snap above the joint. Knowing how devastating losing Krumrie would be, Bengals coach Sam Wyche can be heard talking into his headset at the time, simply saying, "Get up, Tim. Get up, Tim." as Krumrie laid on the field. The injury was severe enough that an inflatable splint had to be brought out onto the field to stabilize the leg and Krumrie was diagnosed with a broken tibia and fibula. Despite his injury, Krumrie refused to go to the hospital, insisting on staying in the locker room and watching the game on television, only leaving when the paramedics told him he might go into shock. After a 15-inch steel rod was surgically implanted to stabilize the leg, Krumrie was ready by the start of the 1989 regular season.

Krumrie played six more years. He led the team with 97 tackles in 1992.

Krumrie concluded his playing career following the 1994 season after compiling 1,017 tackles (700 solo), 34.5 sacks, 13 fumble recoveries, 11 forced fumbles and 10 passes defensed.

== Coaching career ==
After retiring in 1994, Krumrie joined the Bengals organization as defensive line coach and served in that position from 1995 to 2002. Krumrie was also the defensive line coach for the Buffalo Bills under head coach Mike Mularkey from 2003 to 2005. After his contract was not renewed by Buffalo, he was the defensive line coach for the Kansas City Chiefs until his dismissal on January 5, 2010.

In April 2011, Krumrie joined Jerry Glanville's staff as defensive line coach for the UFL Hartford Colonials.

== Personal life ==
Krumrie and his wife, Cheryl, have two children, Kelly and Dexter.

Krumrie has become a bicycling enthusiast, recently completing a 112-mile ride over two mountain passes. He rides 25 to 30 miles a day, and runs five to eight miles every other day.

He currently lives in Steamboat Springs, Colorado. He discovered in 2010 that he had symptoms of brain trauma, but he has sought treatment that he says has improved his health.
