= Lewis Billups =

American football player (1963–1994)

No. 22, 24
- Position: Cornerback

Personal information
- Born: October 10, 1963; Tampa, Florida, U.S.
- Died: April 9, 1994 (aged 30); Orlando, Florida, U.S.
- Listed height: 5 ft 11 in (1.80 m)
- Listed weight: 190 lb (86 kg)

Career information
- High school: Niceville (Niceville, Florida)
- College: North Alabama (1982–1985)
- NFL draft: 1986: 2nd round, 38th overall pick

Career history
- Cincinnati Bengals (1986–1991); Green Bay Packers (1992)

Career NFL statistics
- Interceptions: 9
- Fumble recoveries: 8
- Touchdowns: 1
- Stats at Pro Football Reference

Lewis Kenneth Billups, Jr. (October 10, 1963 – April 9, 1994) was an American professional football cornerback who played seven seasons with the Cincinnati Bengals and Green Bay Packers in the National Football League (NFL), recording nine interceptions and eight fumble recoveries. Billups was known to wear an opponent’s T-shirt the day of the game to stay focused.

== Professional career ==
Known as a tough corner who played with a chip on his shoulder, Billups was a defensive back who was very popular among teammates. He was selected by the Bengals in the second round of the 1986 NFL draft. His best season was in 1988, when he intercepted 4 passes and recovered 2 fumbles, helping Cincinnati reach the Super Bowl.

Billups is often remembered for his critical dropped interception in Super Bowl XXIII. In the beginning of the fourth quarter with the Bengals up 13–6 over the San Francisco 49ers and the 49ers driving from the Bengals 10-yard line, quarterback Joe Montana threw a pass towards Billups that he dropped in the end zone. On the next play, the 49ers scored a touchdown, tying the game at 13. Towards the game's conclusion, Montana threw a 10-yard touchdown pass to John Taylor to give San Francisco a 20–16 lead with 34 seconds left. The 49ers won the game 20–16.

== Legal problems ==
Billups had an extensive history of violence off the football field. In May 1987, Billups was arrested in Hamilton County, Ohio and charged with felony domestic battery for beating his then-girlfriend, a Cincinnati resident named Tracy Fair, after she ended their relationship. She later dropped the criminal charges, but filed a civil lawsuit against Billups. In Billups' civil trial, Fair testified that he threatened to hire someone to cut Fair's face with a razor blade and "finish the job" if she did not drop the criminal charges. Fair also testified that she required six operations on her face from the assault, including a bone grafting procedure in which her nose was reconstructed with bone pulled from her skull and ribcage. Billups ultimately paid Fair $30,000 in an out-of-court settlement.

In January 1990, Billups was arrested in Hamilton County, Ohio and charged with the unlawful possession of a concealed firearm, the unlawful transportation of a firearm in a vehicle while committing a crime, and two counts of aggravated menacing after pointing a .38 caliber pistol at two undercover police officers. He pleaded not guilty. He was later found guilty of all charges by a jury and sentenced to serve 30 days in the Hamilton County jail.

As Billups' NFL career came to an end, his violent behavior continued. In March 1993, Billups was arrested by FBI agents in Fayette County, Kentucky and charged with making terroristic threats against Washington Bullets basketball player Rex Chapman, whose sister, Jenny Chapman, Billups had been dating and allegedly abusing. Billups called Jenny multiple times to warn her against seeing other men after the two broke up. Because of earlier threats and alleged prior abuse, Jenny contacted the FBI, which recorded two of the calls. In one call, Billups stated: "You got your brother's knees in your hands." He said Rex Chapman would "get a visit, boom, boom, boom, boom, boom, boom, down. Next thing you read, Rex Chapman through for the year, maybe for the rest of his career." In the other call, Billups said: "Now, I'm telling you right now as God as my witness, I swear on my mother's life, if you ever speak to a guy, speak -- just say 'Hi' to a guy from Kentucky, I promise you (Billups' associates will) go see your brother and he'll never play basketball again." Billups flew up to Kentucky from Florida to meet Jenny, but instead was met by FBI agents and arrested. Numerous people testified about Billups' violent nature, including Jenny Chapman and Tracy Fair, and stated that they were fearful for their safety in Billups' presence. Billups pleaded guilty to the charge in June 1993 after accepting a plea deal, and he was sentenced to serve twelve months in the federal USP Atlanta, three years of supervised release, and he was fined $10,000.

In October 1993, Billups pleaded no contest in Seminole County, Florida to a charge of criminal conspiracy. Billups was arrested in December 1992 and initially charged with criminal conspiracy as well as aggravated sexual battery and extortion, stemming from an incident where Billups, in collusion with a friend named Gregory Calloway, was accused of drugging and sexually assaulting a woman at Billups' residence in Longwood while Calloway recorded the assault on videotape. According to the victim, Billups, who had been a neighborhood friend, invited her over to his home to join he and Calloway for lunch. An unspecified drug was then slipped into the victim's drink which caused her to pass out. The victim claimed that Billups then threatened to send copies of the videotape to her husband, other family members, and friends listed on her Christmas card list if she failed to meet Billups' demand of paying him and Calloway $20,000 each. Billups and Calloway were subsequently arrested in Seminole County on December 16 after warrants for their arrests were issued, and they were each released on $50,000 bond the following day. This case prompted multiple women to come forward and accuse Billups of sexually assaulting them in similar fashions, but no additional charges were filed. Billups accepted a plea deal that reduced his charges to only one count of criminal conspiracy, and he was sentenced to serve three years of probation, which would begin following his release from the Atlanta federal penitentiary on April 4, 1994. Billups died just five days after his federal incarceration ended.

== Personal life and death ==
When not playing football, Billups spent a great deal of his time in Florida with his family members. One of Billups closest of friends was Bengals wide receiver Tim McGee who was picked alongside Billups in the 1986 draft. His brother, Terry Billups, played defensive back in the NFL and the XFL.

Five days after being released from USP Atlanta, Billups died in a car crash on April 9, 1994. Driving at speeds in excess of 100 mph, he lost control of his Corvette convertible on Interstate 4 when trying to avoid contact with another vehicle making a lane change, destroying over 55 feet of steel security railing in the process. Billups' friend, Danny Green, who was seated next to him, was killed on impact. Billups was thrown from the car and was later found by highway patrol men attending the scene. Billups was taken to a nearby Orlando hospital where he died from his injuries. The details of Billups' exploits are prominently featured in the best-selling book, "Pros And Cons."
