= Eric Thomas (cornerback) =

American football player (born 1964)

No. 22, 26
- Position: Cornerback

Personal information
- Born: September 11, 1964 (age 62); Tucson, Arizona, U.S.
- Listed height: 5 ft 11 in (1.80 m)
- Listed weight: 184 lb (83 kg)

Career information
- High school: Norte del Rio (CA)
- College: Tulane
- NFL draft: 1987: 2nd round, 49th overall pick

Career history
- Cincinnati Bengals (1987–1992); New York Jets (1993–1994); Denver Broncos (1995)

Awards and highlights
- Pro Bowl (1988)

Career NFL statistics
- Interceptions: 17
- Interception yards: 102
- Touchdowns: 1
- Stats at Pro Football Reference

Eric Jason Thomas (born September 11, 1964) is an American former professional football player who was a cornerback for nine seasons in the National Football League (NFL) for the Cincinnati Bengals, New York Jets and Denver Broncos. He played college football for the Tulane Green Wave.

Pre-draft measurables
Height	Weight	Arm length	Hand span	40-yard dash	10-yard split	20-yard split	20-yard shuttle	Vertical jump	Broad jump	Bench press
5 ft 10 1/4 in (1.78 m)	171 lb (78 kg)	30 3/4 in (0.78 m)	8 1/4 in (0.21 m)	4.38 s	1.52 s	2.54 s	4.22 s	35.0 in (0.89 m)	10 ft 6 in (3.20 m)	7 reps
All values from NFL Combine

The Bengals selected Thomas 49th overall in the second round of the 1987 NFL draft. He went to the Pro Bowl after the 1988 season.
