= Ira Hillary =

American football player (born 1962)

No. 89, 84
- Positions: Wide receiver, defensive back

Personal information
- Born: November 13, 1962; Edgefield, South Carolina, U.S.
- Listed height: 5 ft 11 in (1.80 m)
- Listed weight: 195 lb (88 kg)

Career information
- High school: Strom Thurmond (Johnston, South Carolina)
- College: South Carolina
- NFL draft: 1985: 8th round

Career history
- Kansas City Chiefs (1985)*; Cincinnati Bengals (1986–1989); Minnesota Vikings (1990); Cincinnati Rockers (1992–1993)
- * Offseason or practice squad member only

Career NFL statistics
- Receptions: 27
- Receiving yards: 303
- Receiving touchdowns: 2
- Stats at Pro Football Reference

Career AFL statistics
- Receptions: 137
- Receiving yards: 1,805
- Receiving touchdowns: 31
- Tackles: 4
- Stats at ArenaFan.com

Ira McDonald Hillary (born November 13, 1962) is an American former professional football player who was a wide receiver for four seasons for the Cincinnati Bengals and Minnesota Vikings of the National Football League (NFL). He played college football for the South Carolina Gamecocks. He was selected by the Kansas City Chiefs in the eighth round of the 1985 NFL draft.
