= Stanley Wilson (running back) =

American football player (born 1961)

No. 32
- Position: Running back

Personal information
- Born: August 23, 1961 (age 65); Los Angeles, California, U.S.
- Listed height: 5 ft 10 in (1.78 m)
- Listed weight: 209 lb (95 kg)

Career information
- High school: Los Angeles (CA) Banning
- College: Oklahoma
- NFL draft: 1983: 9th round, 248th overall pick

Career history
- Cincinnati Bengals (1983–1988)

Awards and highlights
- First-team All-Big Eight (1981); Second-team All-Big Eight (1982)

Career NFL statistics
- Rushing yards: 1,118
- Average: 4.4
- Rushing touchdowns: 11
- Stats at Pro Football Reference

Stanley Tobias Wilson Sr. (born August 23, 1961) is an American former professional football player who was a running back for the Cincinnati Bengals of the National Football League (NFL). He played college football for the Oklahoma Sooners and selected by the Bengals in the ninth round of the 1983 NFL draft.

Wilson played high school football at Banning High School in Los Angeles, where he played with Freeman McNeil in the backfield and he was the 4A player of the year in 1978 and 1979.

== Drug problems ==
Primarily used as a fullback, Wilson's career was marred by a cocaine habit. He was suspended for the entire 1985 and 1987 seasons for violating the league's drug policy.

=== Super Bowl XXIII and subsequent ban ===
The most notorious instance of Wilson's relapse into cocaine usage was on the eve of Super Bowl XXIII in 1989, where the Bengals were to play the San Francisco 49ers. Wilson told several teammates that he needed to get his playbook before their last meeting prior to the game. Twenty minutes later, his position coach, Jim Anderson, found him in the bathroom, deep in the throes of a cocaine high. The Bengals had no choice but to leave him off the roster. Wilson's relapse was his third offense under the NFL's drug policy, and he was banned from the league for life. Former Cincinnati Bengals coach Sam Wyche has argued that the loss of Wilson may have contributed to the Bengals' loss to the 49ers. The field at Joe Robbie Stadium was somewhat muddy that night, but Wilson usually excelled in these conditions. Wilson was the team's third leading rusher during the season, and had scored 2 touchdowns in their two playoff games prior to the Super Bowl. An attorney representing Wilson claimed that the expelled player was ready to unveil a "shroud of truth" regarding drug use amongst other Bengals, but nothing like that ever happened. Wilson did not contest his lifetime ban at the time and never filed any applications to return to football.

== Later life ==
In the years after his relapse and banishment, Wilson was in and out of rehabilitation on several occasions. In 1999, he was convicted of stealing US$130,000 in property from a Beverly Hills, California home to support his habit. He was sentenced to 22 years in Lancaster, California state prison for burglary. During his trial, Wilson's lawyer contended that Wilson has bipolar disorder. He was released from prison in the early 2010s. As of 2024, he lives in Wisconsin with his wife and two children while on anti-psychotic medication.

== Family ==
His son, Stanley Wilson Jr. attended Stanford University on scholarship as a running back, was later moved to cornerback, and was selected by the Detroit Lions in the third round of the 2005 NFL draft. His youngest son, Seth, played running back at North Dakota State University. On February 1, 2023, Wilson Jr. died after collapsing at Metropolitan State Hospital in Los Angeles County.
