= Cincinnati Bengals draft history =

List Of Cincinnati Bengals NFL Draft Selections

This page is a list of the Cincinnati Bengals National Football League draft selections. The first draft the Bengals participated in was the 1968 NFL/AFL draft, in which they made Bob Johnson of Tennessee their first ever selection.

== Key ==
= Pro Bowler or All-Pro
= MVP
= Hall of Famer

== 1968 draft ==
Round	Pick #	Overall	Name	Position	College
1	2	2	Bob Johnson	Center	Tennessee
2	1	28	Bill Staley	Defensive end	Utah State
2	28	55	Tom Smiley	Running back	Lamar
3	1	56	Gary Davis	Quarterback	Vanderbilt
3	27	82	Paul Robinson	Running back	Arizona
3	28	83	Dale Livingston	Kicker	Western Michigan
4	1	84	Jess Phillips	Running back	Michigan State
4	26	109	Warren McVea	Running back	Houston
5	1	112	Dave Middendorf	Guard	Washington State
5	27	138	Al Beauchamp	Linebacker	Southern
6	1	139	Howard Fest	Offensive tackle	Texas
6	5	143	Billy Kendricks	Offensive tackle	Alabama A&M
6	7	145	John Neidert	Linebacker	Louisville
6	17	155	Dewey Warren	Quarterback	Tennessee
6	18	156	Essex Johnson	Running back	Grambling
6	20	158	Elmo Maple	Wide receiver	Southern
6	22	160	Sidney Ellis	Defensive back	Grambling
6	25	163	Charles Williams	Running back	Arkansas-Pine Bluff
6	27	165	James Johnson	Defensive back	South Carolina State
7	1	166	Steve Smith	Tight end	Miami (FL)
7	27	192	Wes Bean	Linebacker	Grambling
8	1	193	Harry Gunner	Linebacker	Oregon State
8	27	219	Ed Brantley	Offensive tackle	North Texas State
9	1	220	Phil Johnson	Defensive back	Long Beach State
9	27	246	Steve Hanrahan	Defensive tackle	Weber State
10	1	247	Patrick Wayne	Running back	Louisville
10	27	273	James Russell	Wide receiver	North Texas State
11	1	274	Scott Wally	Defensive back	Arizona
11	27	300	Jeff Banks	Linebacker	Pacific
12	1	301	Bob Trumpy	Tight end	Utah
12	27	327	Harold Jones	Offensive tackle	Grambling
13	1	328	James Bivins	Linebacker	Texas Southern
13	27	354	Teddy Washington	Running back	San Diego State
14	1	355	Les Webster	Running back	Iowa State
14	27	381	Steve Lewicke	Wide receiver	UTEP
15	1	382	Harvey Palmore	Guard	Morgan State
15	27	408	Joe Mira	Wide receiver	Miami (FL)
16	1	409	Monk Williams	Linebacker	Alcorn State
16	27	435	Brown Marks	Linebacker	Indiana
17	1	436	Don Manning	Linebacker	UCLA
17	27	462	Jimmy Smith	Tight end	Jackson State

== 1969 draft ==
Round	Pick #	Overall	Name	Position	College
1	5	5	Greg Cook	Quarterback	Cincinnati
2	5	31	Bill Bergey	Linebacker	Arkansas State
3	5	57	Louis "Speedy" Thomas	Wide receiver	Utah
4	5	83	Clem Turner	Running back	Cincinnati
5	5	109	Guy Dennis	Guard	Florida
6	5	135	Ken Riley	Defensive back	Florida A&M
7	5	161	Royce Berry	Defensive end	Houston
8	5	187	Tim Buchanan	Linebacker	Hawaii
9	5	213	Mike Stripling	Running back	Tulsa
10	5	239	Steve Howell	Tight end	Ohio State
11	5	265	Mark Stewart	Defensive back	Georgia
12	5	291	Lonnie Paige	Defensive tackle	North Carolina College
13	5	316	Chuck Benson	Wide receiver	Southern Illinois
14	5	343	Mike Wilson	Offensive tackle	Dayton
15	5	369	Bill Shoemaker	Kicker	Stanford
16	5	395	Bill Schmidt	Linebacker	Missouri
17	5	421	Terry Story	Offensive tackle	Georgia Tech

== 1970 draft ==
Round	Pick #	Overall	Name	Position	College
1	7	7	Mike Reid	Defensive tackle	Penn State
2	6	32	Ron Carpenter	Defensive tackle	North Carolina State
3	8	60	Chip Bennett	Linebacker	Abilene Christian
4	7	85	Joe Stevens	Guard	Jackson State
4	26	104	Billie Hayes	Defensive back	San Diego State
6	8	138	Sandy Durko	Defensive back	USC
7	7	163	Lemar Parrish	Defensive back	Lincoln (MO)
8	6	188	Bill Trout	Defensive tackle	Miami (FL)
9	8	216	Bill Bolden	Running back	UCLA
10	7	241	Nick Roman	Linebacker	Ohio State
11	6	266	Samuel Wallace	Offensive tackle	Grambling
12	8	294	Thomas Truesdell	Defensive end	Ohio Wesleyan
13	7	319	Paul Dunn	Wide receiver	US International
14	3	344	Joe Johnson	Wide receiver	Johnson C. Smith
15	8	372	Marvin Weeks	Defensive back	Alcorn State
16	7	397	Larry Ely	Linebacker	Iowa
17	6	422	Richard Smith	Running back	Washington State

== 1971 draft ==
Round	Pick #	Overall	Name	Position	College
1	15	15	Vernon Holland	Offensive tackle	Tennessee State
2	15	41	Stephen Lawson	Guard	Kansas
3	15	67	Ken Anderson	Quarterback	Augustana
4	15	93	Fred Willis	Running back	Boston College
5	6	110	Art May	Defensive end	Tuskegee
7	11	167	Cornelius Craig	Defensive back	Fisk
8	15	197	Fred Herring	Defensive back	Tennessee State
9	15	223	Gary Gustafson	Linebacker	Montana State
10	15	249	Jack Stambaugh	Guard	Oregon
11	15	275	Edward Marshall	Wide receiver	Cameron State
12	15	301	James Hayden	Defensive end	Memphis State
13	15	327	David Knapman	Tight end	Central Washington
14	15	353	Irvin Mallory	Defensive back	Virginia Union
15	15	379	Bob Thomas	Running back	Arizona State
16	15	405	Mark Debevc	Linebacker	Ohio State
17	16	432	Sam Pearson	Defensive back	Western Kentucky

== 1972 draft ==
Round	Pick #	Overall	Name	Position	College
1	2	2	Sherman White	Defensive end	California
2	3	29	Tommy Casanova	Defensive back	LSU
3	2	54	Jim LeClair	Linebacker	North Dakota
4	3	81	Bernard Jackson	Defensive back	Washington State
5	2	106	Tom DeLeone	Center	Ohio State
7	2	158	Steve Conley	Running back	Kansas
8	3	185	Dan Kratzer	Wide receiver	Missouri Valley
9	2	210	Stan Walters	Offensive tackle	Syracuse
10	3	237	Brian Foster	Defensive back	Colorado
11	1	261	Kent Pederson	Tight end	UC Santa Barbara
12	3	289	Frederick Wegis	Defensive back	Cal Poly
13	2	314	James Hamilton	Quarterback	Arizona State
14	3	341	Steve Porter	Wide receiver	Indiana
15	2	366	Hosea Minnieweather	Defensive tackle	Jackson State
16	3	393	John Wiegman	Wide receiver	Cal Poly
17	2	418	David Green	Punter	Ohio

== 1973 draft ==
Round	Pick #	Overall	Name	Position	College
1	15	15	Isaac Curtis	Wide receiver	San Diego State
2	17	43	Albert Chandler	Tight end	Oklahoma
3	16	68	Tim George	Wide receiver	Carson-Newman
5	17	121	Bob McCall	Running back	Arizona
6	16	146	Bob Jones	Defensive back	Virginia Union
7	15	171	Bob Maddox	Defensive end	Frostburg State
8	17	199	Joe Wilson	Running back	Holy Cross
9	16	224	John Dampeer	Guard	Notre Dame
10	15	249	Lenvil Elliott	Running back	Northeast Missouri State
11	17	277	William Montgomery	Defensive back	Morehouse
12	16	302	Charles Clark	Running back	Bethune-Cookman
13	15	327	Brooks West	Defensive tackle	UTEP
14	17	355	Hurles Scales	Defensive back	North Texas State
15	16	380	Ted McNulty	Quarterback	Indiana
16	15	405	Harry Unger	Running back	Auburn
17	17	433	Wayne Estabrook	Quarterback	Whittier

== 1974 draft ==
Round	Pick #	Overall	Name	Position	College
1	23	23	Bill Kollar	Defensive tackle	Montana State
2	22	48	Charlie Davis	Running back	Colorado
3	9	61	Dave Lapham	Guard	Syracuse
3	21	73	Evan Jolitz	Linebacker	Cincinnati
4	9	87	Mike Boryla	Quarterback	Stanford
4	20	98	Darryl White	Guard	Nebraska
4	25	103	Richard Williams	Wide receiver	Abilene Christian
5	10	114	Haskel Stanback	Running back	Tennessee
5	23	127	Richard Bishop	Defensive tackle	Louisville
6	22	152	Robin Sinclair	Defensive back	Washington State
6	23	153	William Bryant	Defensive back	Grambling
7	21	177	Ken Sawyer	Defensive back	Syracuse
8	20	202	John McDaniel	Wide receiver	Lincoln (MO)
9	23	231	Edward Johnson	Defensive end	Southern Methodist
10	22	256	Chuck Herd	Tight end	Penn State
11	21	281	Ed Kezirian	Offensive tackle	UCLA
12	20	306	Rudy McClinon	Defensive back	Xavier
13	23	335	Ted Jornou	Linebacker	Iowa State
14	22	360	Mike Phillips	Offensive tackle	Cornell
15	21	385	Isaac Jackson	Running back	Kansas State
16	20	410	Darryl Bishop	Defensive back	Kentucky
17	23	439	Jim Smith	Running back	North Carolina Central

== 1975 draft ==
Round	Pick #	Overall	Name	Position	College
1	14	14	Glenn Cameron	Linebacker	Florida
2	13	39	Al Krevis	Offensive tackle	Boston College
3	3	55	Gary Burley	Defensive end	Pittsburgh
3	12	64	Gary Sheide	Quarterback	Brigham Young
3	25	77	Bo Harris	Linebacker	LSU
4	19	97	Stan Fritts	Running back	North Carolina State
5	16	120	Pat McInally	Wide receiver	Harvard
5	18	122	Jeff West	Punter	Cincinnati
6	12	142	Tom Shuman	Quarterback	Penn State
6	15	145	Rollen Smith	Defensive back	Arkansas
7	14	170	Chris Devlin	Linebacker	Penn State
8	13	195	Ricky Davis	Defensive back	Alabama
9	12	220	Greg Dubinetz	Guard	Yale
9	19	227	Lofell Williams	Wide receiver	Virginia Union
10	11	245	Rockey Felker	Defensive back	Mississippi State
11	16	276	Marvin Cobb	Defensive back	USC
12	15	301	Jack Novak	Tight end	Wisconsin
13	14	326	Ron Rosenberg	Linebacker	Montana
14	13	351	Frank Haywood	Defensive tackle	North Carolina State
15	12	376	Greg Enright	Kicker	Southern Oregon State
16	11	401	John Tuttle	Wide receiver	Kansas State
17	16	432	Elvin Charity	Defensive back	Yale

== 1976 draft ==
Round	Pick #	Overall	Name	Position	College
1	11	11	Billy Brooks	Wide receiver	Oklahoma
1	24	24	Archie Griffin	Running back	Ohio State
2	10	38	Glenn Bujnoch	Guard	Texas A&M
2	23	51	Chris Bahr	Kicker	Penn State
3	9	69	Danny Reece	Defensive back	USC
3	22	82	Reggie Williams	Linebacker	Dartmouth
4	14	106	Tony Davis	Running back	Nebraska
4	24	116	Greg Fairchild	Guard	Tulsa
5	14	138	Willie Shelby	Running back	Alabama
5	23	147	Scott Perry	Defensive back	Williams
6	20	176	Orlando Nelson	Tight end	Utah State
7	5	187	Bob Bateman	Quarterback	Brown
7	10	192	Carmen Rome	Defensive back	Miami (OH)
7	23	205	Ken Kuhn	Linebacker	Ohio State
8	23	232	Ron Hunt	Offensive tackle	Oregon
9	22	259	Lonnie Allgood	Wide receiver	Syracuse
10	22	287	Tom Klaban	Kicker	Ohio State
11	23	314	Melvin Morgan	Defensive back	Mississippi Valley State
12	22	341	Joe Dale Harris	Wide receiver	Alabama
13	24	371	Randy Walker	Running back	Miami (OH)
14	23	398	Greg Coleman	Punter	Florida A&M
15	22	425	Lynn Hieber	Quarterback	Indiana (PA)
16	24	455	George Demopoulis	Center	Miami (FL)
17	23	482	Scott Dannelley	Guard	Ohio State

== 1977 draft ==
Round	Pick #	Overall	Name	Position	College
1	3	3	Eddie Edwards	Defensive end	Miami (FL)
1	8	8	Wilson Whitley	Defensive tackle	Houston
1	22	22	Mike Cobb	Tight end	Michigan State
2	21	49	Pete Johnson	Running back	Ohio State
3	20	76	Mike Voight	Running back	North Carolina
4	1	85	Rick Walker	Tight end	UCLA
4	19	103	Mike Wilson	Offensive tackle	Georgia
4	21	105	Jerry Anderson	Defensive back	Oklahoma
5	21	133	Ray Phillips	Linebacker	Nebraska
6	21	160	Tommy Duniven	Quarterback	Texas Tech
7	20	187	Louis Breeden	Defensive back	North Carolina Central
7	27	194	Jim Corbett	Tight end	Pittsburgh
8	19	214	Jose St. Victor	Guard	Syracuse
9	22	245	Willie Zachary	Wide receiver	Central State (OH)
10	21	272	Bob Bialik	Punter	Hillsdale
11	13	292	Joel Parrish	Guard	Georgia
11	20	299	Carl Allen	Defensive back	Southern Miss
12	15	322	Terry Irving	Defensive back	Jackson State
12	19	326	Alex Percival	Wide receiver	Morehouse

== 1978 draft ==
Round	Pick #	Overall	Name	Position	College
1	8	8	Ross Browner	Defensive end	Notre Dame
1	16	16	Blair Bush	Center	Washington
2	7	35	Ray Griffin	Defensive back	Ohio State
2	17	45	Dave Turner	Running back	San Diego State
3	16	72	Ted Vincent	Defensive tackle	Wichita State
3	27	83	Don Bass	Wide receiver	Houston
4	15	99	Dennis Law	Wide receiver	East Tennessee State
5	16	126	Tom Dinkel	Linebacker	Kansas
5	21	131	Rob Hertel	Quarterback	USC
6	17	155	Steve Geise	Running back	Penn State
7	16	182	Joe Branson	Defensive back	Livingstone
7	27	193	Danny Bass	Offensive tackle	Elon
8	17	211	Bill Miller	Offensive tackle	Western Illinois
9	16	238	Ron Shumon	Linebacker	Wichita State
10	17	267	Tom DePaso	Linebacker	Penn State
11	14	292	Cal Prince	Running back	Louisville
11	16	294	Mark Donahue	Guard	Michigan
12	17	323	Kim Featsent	Wide receiver	Kent State

== 1979 draft ==
Round	Pick #	Overall	Name	Position	College
1	3	3	Jack Thompson	Quarterback	Washington State
1	12	12	Charles Alexander	Running back	LSU
2	2	30	Dan Ross	Tight end	Northeastern
3	3	59	Barney Cotton	Guard	Nebraska
4	2	84	James White	Defensive tackle	Albany State
4	9	91	Vaughn Lusby	Defensive back	Arkansas
5	3	113	Casey Merrill	Defensive end	UC Davis
6	2	139	Steve Kreider	Wide receiver	Lehigh
7	3	168	Max Montoya	Offensive tackle	UCLA
8	2	194	Howie Kurnick	Linebacker	Cincinnati
9	3	223	Scott Burk	Defensive back	Oklahoma State
10	2	250	Nathan Poole	Running back	Louisville
11	3	278	Ken Bungarda	Defensive end	Missouri
12	1	304	Jim Browner	Defensive back	Notre Dame

== 1980 draft ==
Round	Pick #	Overall	Name	Position	College
1	3	3	Anthony Muñoz	Offensive tackle	USC
2	3	31	Kirby Criswell	Linebacker	Kansas
3	3	59	Rod Horn	Defensive tackle	Nebraska
4	3	86	Bill Glass	Guard	Baylor
5	3	113	Bryan Hicks	Defensive back	McNeese State
6	3	141	Jo Jo Heath	Defensive back	Pittsburgh
6	21	159	Andrew Melontree	Linebacker	Baylor
7	2	167	Ron Simpkins	Linebacker	Michigan
7	3	168	Gary Don Johnson	Defensive tackle	Baylor
8	3	196	Mark Lyles	Running back	Florida State
9	3	224	Greg Bright	Defensive back	Morehead State
10	3	252	Sandro Vitiello	Kicker	Massachusetts
11	4	281	Alton Alexis	Wide receiver	Tulane
12	3	308	Mike Wright	Quarterback	Vanderbilt

== 1981 draft ==
Round	Pick #	Overall	Name	Position	College
1	10	10	David Verser	Wide receiver	Kansas
2	9	37	Cris Collinsworth	Wide receiver	Florida
3	8	64	John Simmons	Defensive back	SMU
4	10	93	Guy Frazier	Linebacker	Wyoming
5	9	120	Benjie Pryor	Tight end	Pittsburgh
6	8	146	Rex Robinson	Kicker	Georgia
7	10	176	Jeff Schuh	Linebacker	Minnesota
8	9	202	Bobby Kemp	Defensive back	Cal State Fullerton
9	8	229	Jim Hannula	Offensive tackle	Northern Illinois
9	9	230	Samoa Samoa	Running back	Washington State
10	10	258	Hubert Simpson	Running back	Tennessee
11	9	285	Robert Jackson	Defensive back	Central Michigan
12	8	312	Mark O'Connell	Quarterback	Ball State

== 1982 draft ==
Round	Pick #	Overall	Name	Position	College
1	26	26	Glen Collins	Defensive end	Mississippi State
2	27	54	Emanuel Weaver	Defensive tackle	South Carolina
3	27	82	Rodney Holman	Tight end	Tulane
4	27	110	Rodney Tate	Running back	Texas
5	27	138	Paul Sorensen	Defensive back	Washington State
6	27	166	Arthur King	Defensive tackle	Grambling State
7	27	194	Ben Needham	Linebacker	Michigan
8	27	222	Kari Yli-Renko	Offensive tackle	Cincinnati
9	27	250	James Bennett	Wide receiver	Northwestern State
10	27	278	Larry Hogue	Defensive back	Utah State
11	26	305	Russell Davis	Running back	Idaho
12	27	333	Dan Feraday	Quarterback	Toronto

== 1983 draft ==
Round	Pick #	Overall	Name	Position	College
1	25	25	Dave Rimington	Center	Nebraska
2	25	53	Ray Horton	Defensive back	Washington
3	25	81	Jim Turner	Defensive back	UCLA
4	25	109	Steve Maidlow	Linebacker	Michigan State
5	25	137	Jeff Christensen	Quarterback	Eastern Illinois
6	12	152	Kiki DeAyala	Linebacker	Texas
6	25	165	Larry Kinnebrew	Running back	Tennessee State
7	25	193	James Griffin	Defensive back	Middle Tennessee State
8	25	221	Mike Martin	Wide receiver	Illinois
9	24	248	Stanley Wilson	Running back	Oklahoma
10	25	276	Tim Krumrie	Defensive tackle	Wisconsin
11	25	304	Gary Williams	Wide receiver	Ohio State
12	25	332	Andre Young	Linebacker	Bowling Green

== 1984 draft ==
Round	Pick #	Overall	Name	Position	College
1	7	7	Ricky Hunley	Linebacker	Arizona
1	16	16	Pete Koch	Defensive end	Maryland
1	28	28	Brian Blados	Offensive tackle	North Carolina
2	10	38	Boomer Esiason	Quarterback	Maryland
3	9	65	Stanford Jennings	Running back	Furman
4	8	92	John Farley	Running back	Sacramento State
5	7	119	Barney Bussey	Defensive back	South Carolina State
6	10	150	Don Kern	Tight end	Arizona State
7	9	177	Leo Barker	Linebacker	New Mexico State
8	8	204	Bruce Reimers	Guard	Iowa
9	7	231	Bruce Kozerski	Center	Holy Cross
10	10	262	Aaron Jackson	Linebacker	North Carolina
10	13	265	Brent Ziegler	Running back	Syracuse
11	9	289	Steve McKeaver	Running back	Central State (OK)
12	8	316	Steve Raquet	Linebacker	Holy Cross

== 1984 Supplemental Draft ==
Round	Pick #	Overall	Name	Position	Pro Team	College
1	7	7	Wayne Peace	Quarterback	Tampa Bay Bandits	Florida
2	10	38	Bill Johnson	Running back	Denver Gold	Arkansas State
3	9	65	Tom Kilkenny	Linebacker	Chicago Blitz	Temple

== 1985 draft ==
Round	Pick #	Overall	Name	Position	College
1	13	13	Eddie Brown	Wide receiver	Miami (FL)
1	25	25	Emanuel King	Linebacker	Alabama
2	15	43	Carl Zander	Linebacker	Tennessee
3	14	70	Sean Thomas	Defensive back	TCU
4	13	97	Anthony Tuggle	Defensive back	Nicholls State
5	15	127	Tony Degrate	Defensive tackle	Texas
5	17	129	Lee Davis	Defensive back	Ole Miss
6	8	148	Eric Stokes	Offensive tackle	Northeastern
6	14	154	Keith Lester	Tight end	Murray State
7	4	172	Kim Locklin	Running back	New Mexico State
7	13	181	Joe Walter	Offensive tackle	Texas Tech
8	15	211	Dave Strobel	Linebacker	Iowa
9	14	238	Keith Cruise	Defensive end	Northwestern
10	13	265	Bernard King	Linebacker	Syracuse
11	16	296	Harold Stanfield	Tight end	Mississippi College
12	14	322	Louis Garza	Offensive tackle	New Mexico State

== 1986 draft ==
Round	Pick #	Overall	Name	Position	College
1	11	11	Joe Kelly	Linebacker	Washington
1	21	21	Tim McGee	Wide receiver	Tennessee
2	11	38	Lewis Billups	Defensive back	North Alabama
3	3	58	Jim Skow	Defensive end	Nebraska
3	10	65	Mike Hammerstein	Defensive tackle	Michigan
3	23	78	David Fulcher	Defensive back	Arizona State
4	9	91	Eric Kattus	Tight end	Michigan
4	17	99	Doug Gaynor	Quarterback	Long Beach State
5	13	123	Leon White	Linebacker	Brigham Young
6	14	152	Gary Hunt	Defensive back	Memphis State
7	11	177	Pat Franklin	Running back	Southwest Texas State
8	10	204	David Douglas	Guard	Tennessee
9	9	230	Cary Whittingham	Linebacker	Brigham Young
10	13	262	Jeff Shaw	Defensive tackle	Salem (WV)
11	12	289	Tim Stone	Offensive tackle	Kansas State
11	17	294	Tom Flaherty	Linebacker	Northwestern
12	11	316	Steve Bradley	Quarterback	Indiana

== 1987 draft ==
Round	Pick #	Overall	Name	Position	College
1	17	17	Jason Buck	Defensive end	Brigham Young
2	21	49	Eric Thomas	Defensive back	Tulane
3	20	76	Leonard Bell	Defensive back	Indiana
3	21	77	Skip McClendon	Defensive end	Arizona State
4	19	103	Jim Riggs	Tight end	Clemson
5	18	130	Marc Logan	Running back	Kentucky
5	27	139	Greg Horne	Punter	Arkansas
6	17	157	Sonny Gordon	Defensive back	Ohio State
7	20	188	Chris Thatcher	Guard	Louisiana-Lafayette
8	20	215	Solomon Wilcots	Defensive back	Colorado
9	19	242	Craig Raddatz	Linebacker	Wisconsin
10	18	269	David McCluskey	Running back	Georgia
11	17	296	Jim Warne	Offensive tackle	Arizona State
12	21	328	John Holifeld	Running back	West Virginia

== 1988 draft ==
Round	Pick #	Overall	Name	Position	College
1	5	5	Rickey Dixon	Defensive back	Oklahoma
2	4	31	Ickey Woods	Running back	UNLV
3	2	57	Kevin Walker	Linebacker	Maryland
4	2	84	David Grant	Defensive end	West Virginia
5	5	114	Herb Wester	Offensive tackle	Iowa
6	4	141	Paul Jetton	Center	Texas
7	3	168	Rich Romer	Linebacker	Union (NY)
8	2	195	Curtis Maxey	Defensive tackle	Grambling
9	5	226	Brandy Wells	Defensive back	Notre Dame
10	4	253	Ellis Dillahunt	Defensive back	East Carolina
11	3	280	Paul Hickert	Kicker	Murray State
12	2	307	Carl Parker	Wide receiver	Vanderbilt

== 1989 draft ==
Round	Pick #	Overall	Name	Position	College
2	7	35	Eric Ball	Running back	UCLA
2	27	55	Freddie Childress	Offensive tackle	Arkansas
3	27	83	Erik Wilhelm	Quarterback	Oregon State
4	5	89	Kerry Owens	Linebacker	Arkansas
4	27	111	Rob Woods	Offensive tackle	Arizona
5	26	183	Natu Tuatagaloa	Defensive end	California
6	27	166	Craig Taylor	Running back	West Virginia
7	27	194	Kendal Smith	Wide receiver	Utah State
8	27	222	Chris Chenault	Linebacker	Kentucky
9	27	250	Richard Stephens	Guard	Tulsa
10	5	256	Cornell Holloway	Defensive back	Pittsburgh
10	27	278	Bob Jean	Quarterback	New Hampshire
11	27	306	Dana Wells	Defensive tackle	Arizona
12	27	334	Scott Jones	Offensive tackle	Washington

== 1990 draft ==
Round	Pick #	Overall	Name	Position	College
1	12	12	James Francis	Linebacker	Baylor
2	13	38	Harold Green	Running back	South Carolina
3	12	65	Bernard Clark	Linebacker	Miami (FL)
4	10	91	Mike Brennan	Guard	Notre Dame
5	13	122	Lynn James	Wide receiver	Arizona State
6	13	150	Don Odegard	Defensive back	UNLV
7	12	177	Craig Ogletree	Linebacker	Auburn
8	11	204	Doug Wellsandt	Tight end	Washington State
9	14	234	Mitchell Price	Defensive back	Tulane
10	13	261	Eric Crigler	Offensive tackle	Murray State
11	12	288	Tim O'Connor	Offensive tackle	Virginia
12	10	314	Andre Riley	Wide receiver	Washington

== 1991 draft ==
Round	Pick #	Overall	Name	Position	College
1	18	18	Alfred Williams	Linebacker	Colorado
2	25	52	Lamar Rogers	Defensive end	Auburn
3	17	72	Bob Dahl	Guard	Notre Dame
4	16	99	Donald Hollas	Quarterback	Rice
4	26	109	Rob Carpenter	Wide receiver	Syracuse
5	19	130	Mike Arthur	Center	Texas A&M
6	18	157	Richard Fain	Defensive back	Florida
7	17	184	Fernandus Vinson	Defensive back	North Carolina State
8	16	211	Mike Dingle	Running back	South Carolina
9	18	241	Shane Garrett	Wide receiver	Texas A&M
10	18	268	Jim Lavin	Guard	Georgia Tech
11	17	295	Chris Smith	Tight end	Brigham Young
12	16	322	Antoine Bennett	Defensive back	Florida A&M

== 1992 draft ==
Round	Pick #	Overall	Name	Position	College
1	6	6	David Klingler	Quarterback	Houston
1	28	28	Darryl Williams	Free safety	Miami (FL)
2	3	31	Carl Pickens	Wide receiver	Tennessee
3	28	84	Leonard Wheeler	Defensive back	Troy State
4	4	88	Ricardo McDonald	Linebacker	Pittsburgh
5	3	115	Craig Thompson	Tight end	North Carolina A&T
6	2	142	Chris Burns	Defensive tackle	Middle Tennessee State
7	4	172	Lance Olberding	Offensive tackle	Iowa
8	3	199	Roosevelt Nix	Defensive end	Central State (OH)
9	2	226	Ostell Miles	Running back	Houston
10	4	256	Horace Smith	Defensive back	Oregon Tech
11	3	283	John Earle	Offensive tackle	Western Illinois
12	2	310	Eric Shaw	Linebacker	Louisiana Tech

== 1993 draft ==
Round	Pick #	Overall	Name	Position	College
1	5	5	John Copeland	Defensive end	Alabama
2	8	37	Tony McGee	Tight end	Michigan
3	3	59	Steve Tovar	Middle linebacker	Ohio State
3	7	63	Ty Parten	Defensive tackle	Arizona
4	6	90	Marcello Simmons	Cornerback	SMU
5	5	117	Forey Duckett	Cornerback	Nevada
6	8	148	Tom Scott	Guard	East Carolina
7	7	175	Lance Gunn	Defensive back	Texas
8	6	202	Doug Pelfrey	Kicker	Kentucky

== 1994 draft ==
Round	Pick #	Overall	Name	Position	College
1	1	1	Dan Wilkinson	Defensive tackle	Ohio State
2	1	30	Darnay Scott	Wide receiver	San Diego State
3	1	66	Jeff Cothran	Running back	Ohio State
3	21	86	Steve Shine	Linebacker	Northwestern
4	1	104	Corey Sawyer	Defensive back	Florida State
5	1	132	Trent Pollard	Offensive tackle	Eastern Washington
6	1	162	Kimo von Oelhoffen	Defensive tackle	Boise State
6	23	184	Jerry Reynolds	Offensive tackle	UNLV
7	1	195	Ramondo Stallings	Defensive end	San Diego State

== 1995 draft ==
Round	Pick #	Overall	Name	Position	College
1	1	1	Ki-Jana Carter	Running back	Penn State
3	5	69	Melvin Tuten	Offensive tackle	Syracuse
4	4	102	Sam Shade	Strong safety	Alabama
5	5	139	David Dunn	Wide receiver	Fresno State
6	4	175	Ryan Grigson	Offensive tackle	Purdue
7	5	213	John Walsh	Quarterback	Brigham Young

== 1996 draft ==
Round	Pick #	Overall	Name	Position	College
1	10	10	Willie Anderson	Offensive tackle	Auburn
2	9	39	Marco Battaglia	Tight end	Rutgers
3	8	69	Ken Blackman	Offensive tackle	Illinois
4	13	108	Jevon Langford	Defensive end	Oklahoma
5	12	144	Greg Myers	Safety	Colorado State
6	11	178	Tom Tumulty	Linebacker	Pittsburgh
7	10	219	Rod Jones	Offensive tackle	Kansas

== 1997 draft ==
Round	Pick #	Overall	Name	Position	College
1	14	14	Reinard Wilson	Defensive end	Florida State
2	13	43	Corey Dillon	Running back	Washington
3	16	76	Rod Payne	Center	Michigan
4	15	111	Tremain Mack	Free safety	Miami (FL)
5	14	144	Andre Purvis	Defensive tackle	North Carolina
6	13	176	Canute Curtis	Outside linebacker	West Virginia
7	16	217	William Carr	Defensive tackle	Michigan

== 1998 draft ==
Round	Pick #	Overall	Name	Position	College
1	13	13	Takeo Spikes	Linebacker	Auburn
1	17	17	Brian Simmons	Linebacker	North Carolina
2	13	43	Artrell Hawkins	Cornerback	Cincinnati
3	14	75	Steve Foley	Linebacker	Louisiana-Monroe
3	17	78	Mike Goff	Guard	Iowa
4	13	105	Glen Steele	Defensive tackle	Michigan
6	14	167	Jason Tucker	Wide receiver	TCU
7	13	202	Marcus Parker	Running back	Virginia Tech
7	33	222	Damian Vaughn	Tight end	Miami (OH)

== 1999 draft ==
Round	Pick #	Overall	Name	Position	College
1	3	3	Akili Smith	Quarterback	Oregon
2	2	33	Charles Fisher	Cornerback	West Virginia
3	4	65	Cory Hall	Strong safety	Fresno State
4	3	98	Craig Yeast	Wide receiver	Kentucky
5	2	135	Nick Luchey	Running back	Miami (FL)
6	4	173	Kelly Gregg	Defensive tackle	Oklahoma
7	3	209	Tony Coats	Guard	Washington
7	39	245	Scott Covington	Quarterback	Miami (FL)
7	43	249	Donald Broomfield	Defensive tackle	Clemson

== 2000 draft ==
Round	Pick #	Overall	Name	Position	College
1	4	4	Peter Warrick	Wide receiver	Florida State
2	3	34	Mark Roman	Defensive back	LSU
3	4	66	Ron Dugans	Wide receiver	Florida State
4	3	97	Curtis Keaton	Running back	James Madison
5	4	133	Robert Bean	Cornerback	Mississippi State
6	3	169	Neil Rackers	Kicker	Illinois
7	4	210	Brad St. Louis	Tight end	Southwest Missouri State

== 2001 draft ==
Round	Pick #	Overall	Name	Position	College
1	4	4	Justin Smith	Defensive end	Missouri
2	5	36	Chad Johnson	Wide receiver	Oregon State
3	4	66	Sean Brewer	Tight end	San Jose State
4	5	100	Rudi Johnson	Running back	Auburn
5	4	135	Victor Leyva	Guard	Arizona State
6	5	168	Riall Johnson	Linebacker	Stanford
7	4	204	T. J. Houshmandzadeh	Wide receiver	Oregon State

== 2002 draft ==
Round	Pick #	Overall	Name	Position	College
1	10	10	Levi Jones	Offensive tackle	Arizona State
2	9	41	Lamont Thompson	Free safety	Washington State
3	2	67	Matt Schobel	Tight end	TCU
4	11	109	Travis Dorsch	Kicker	Purdue
6	9	181	Marquand Manuel	Strong safety	Florida
7	8	219	Joey Evans	Defensive end	North Carolina

== 2003 draft ==
Round	Pick #	Overall	Name	Position	College
1	1	1	Carson Palmer	Quarterback	USC
2	1	33	Eric Steinbach	Guard	Iowa
3	1	65	Kelley Washington	Wide receiver	Tennessee
4	1	98	Dennis Weathersby	Cornerback	Oregon State
4	21	118	Jeremi Johnson	Fullback	Western Kentucky
5	1	136	Khalid Abdullah	Linebacker	Mars Hill
6	1	174	Langston Moore	Defensive tackle	South Carolina
7	1	215	Scott Kooistra	Offensive tackle	North Carolina State
7	45	259	Elton Patterson	Defensive end	Central Florida

== 2004 draft ==
Round	Pick #	Overall	Name	Position	College
1	26	26	Chris Perry	Running back	Michigan
2	17	49	Keiwan Ratliff	Cornerback	Florida
2	24	56	Madieu Williams	Safety	Maryland
3	17	80	Caleb Miller	Linebacker	Arkansas
3	33	96	Landon Johnson	Linebacker	Purdue
4	18	114	Matthias Askew	Defensive tackle	Michigan State
4	21	117	Robert Geathers	Defensive end	Georgia
4	27	123	Stacy Andrews	Offensive tackle	Ole Miss
5	17	149	Maurice Mann	Wide receiver	Nevada
6	18	183	Greg Brooks	Defensive back	Southern Miss
7	17	218	Casey Bramlet	Quarterback	Wyoming

== 2005 draft ==
Round	Pick #	Overall	Name	Position	College
1	17	17	David Pollack	Defensive end	Georgia
2	16	48	Odell Thurman	Linebacker	Georgia
3	19	83	Chris Henry	Wide receiver	West Virginia
4	18	119	Eric Ghiaciuc	Center	Central Michigan
5	17	153	Adam Kieft	Offensive tackle	Central Michigan
6	16	190	Tab Perry	Wide receiver	UCLA
7	19	233	Jonathan Fanene	Defensive end	Utah

== 2006 draft ==
Round	Pick #	Overall	Name	Position	College
1	24	24	Johnathan Joseph	Cornerback	South Carolina
2	23	55	Andrew Whitworth	Offensive tackle	LSU
3	27	91	Frostee Rucker	Defensive end	USC
4	26	123	Domata Peko	Defensive tackle	Michigan State
5	24	157	A. J. Nicholson	Linebacker	Florida State
6	24	190	Reggie McNeal	Wide receiver/quarterback	Texas A&M
7	1	209	Ethan Kilmer	Defensive back	Penn State
7	23	231	Bennie Brazell	Wide receiver	LSU
3^{*}	0	0	Ahmad Brooks	Linebacker	Virginia

== 2007 draft ==
Round	Pick #	Overall	Name	Position	College
1	18	18	Leon Hall	Cornerback	Michigan
2	17	49	Kenny Irons	Running back	Auburn
4	15	114	Marvin White	Safety	TCU
5	14	151	Jeff Rowe	Quarterback	Nevada
6	13	187	Matt Toeaina	Defensive tackle	Oregon
7	20	230	Dan Santucci	Guard	Notre Dame
7	43	253	Chinedum Ndukwe	Safety	Notre Dame

== 2008 draft ==
Round	Pick #	Overall	Name	Position	College
1	9	9	Keith Rivers	Linebacker	USC
2	15	46	Jerome Simpson	Wide receiver	Coastal Carolina
3	14	77	Pat Sims	Defensive tackle	Auburn
3	34	97	Andre Caldwell	Wide receiver	Florida
4	13	112	Anthony Collins	Offensive tackle	Kansas
5	10	145	Jason Shirley	Defensive tackle	Fresno State
6	11	177	Corey Lynch	Safety	Appalachian State
6	41	207	Matt Sherry	Tight end	Villanova
7	37	244	Angelo Craig	Defensive end	Cincinnati
7	39	247	Mario Urrutia	Wide receiver	Louisville

== 2009 draft ==
Round	Pick #	Overall	Name	Position	College
1	6	6	Andre Smith	Offensive tackle	Alabama
2	6	38	Rey Maualuga	Linebacker	USC
3	6	70	Michael Johnson	Defensive end	Georgia Tech
3	34	98	Chase Coffman	Tight end	Missouri
4	6	106	Jonathan Luigs	Center	Arkansas
5	6	142	Kevin Huber	Punter	Cincinnati
6	6	179	Morgan Trent	Cornerback	Michigan
6	36	209	Bernard Scott	Running back	Abilene Christian
7	6	215	Fui Vakapuna	Fullback	Brigham Young
7	40	249	Clinton McDonald	Defensive tackle	Memphis
7	43	252	Freddie Brown	Wide receiver	Utah

== 2010 draft ==
Round	Pick #	Overall	Name	Position	College
1	21	21	Jermaine Gresham	Tight end	Oklahoma
2	22	54	Carlos Dunlap	Defensive end	Florida
3	20	84	Jordan Shipley	Wide receiver	Texas
3	32	96	Brandon Ghee	Cornerback	Wake Forest
4	22	120	Geno Atkins	Defensive tackle	Georgia
4	33	131	Roddrick Muckelroy	Linebacker	Texas
5	21	152	Otis Hudson	Guard	Eastern Illinois
6	22	191	Dezmon Briscoe	Wide receiver	Kansas
7	21	228	Reggie Stephens	Guard	Iowa State

== 2011 draft ==
Round	Pick #	Overall	Name	Position	College
1	4	4	A. J. Green	Wide receiver	Georgia
2	3	35	Andy Dalton	Quarterback	TCU
3	2	66	Dontay Moch	Linebacker	Nevada
4	4	101	Clint Boling	Guard	Georgia
5	3	134	Robert Sands	Safety	West Virginia
6	2	167	Ryan Whalen	Wide receiver	Stanford
7	4	207	Korey Lindsey	Cornerback	Southern Illinois
7	43	246	Jay Finley	Running back	Baylor

== 2012 draft ==
Round	Pick #	Overall	Name	Position	College
1	17	17	Dre Kirkpatrick	Cornerback	Alabama
1	27	27	Kevin Zeitler	Guard	Wisconsin
2	21	53	Devon Still	Defensive tackle	Penn State
3	20	83	Mohamed Sanu	Wide receiver	Rutgers
3	30	93	Brandon Thompson	Defensive tackle	Clemson
4	21	116	Orson Charles	Tight end	Georgia
5	21	156	Shaun Prater	Cornerback	Iowa
5	31	166	Marvin Jones	Wide receiver	California
5	32	167	George Iloka	Safety	Boise State
6	21	191	Daniel Herron	Running back	Ohio State

== 2013 draft ==
Round	Pick #	Overall	Name	Position	College
1	21	21	Tyler Eifert	Tight end	Notre Dame
2	5	37	Giovani Bernard	Running back	North Carolina
2	21	53	Margus Hunt	Defensive end	Southern Methodist
3	22	84	Shawn Williams	Safety	Georgia
4	21	118	Sean Porter	Linebacker	Texas A&M
5	23	156	Tanner Hawkinson	Guard	Kansas
6	22	190	Rex Burkhead	Running back	Nebraska
6	29	197	Cobi Hamilton	Wide receiver	Arkansas
7	34	240	Reid Fragel	Offensive tackle	Ohio State
7	45	251	T. J. Johnson	Center	South Carolina

== 2014 draft ==
Round	Pick #	Overall	Name	Position	College
1	24	24	Darqueze Dennard	Cornerback	Michigan State
2	23	55	Jeremy Hill	Running back	LSU
3	24	88	Will Clarke	Defensive end	West Virginia
4	11	111	Russell Bodine	Center	North Carolina
5	24	164	A. J. McCarron	Quarterback	Alabama
6	36	212	Marquis Flowers	Linebacker	Arizona
7	24	239	James Wright	Wide receiver	LSU
7	37	252	Lavelle Westbrooks	Cornerback	Georgia Southern

== 2015 draft ==
Round	Pick #	Overall	Name	Position	College
1	21	21	Cedric Ogbuehi	Offensive tackle	Texas A&M
2	21	53	Jake Fisher	Offensive tackle	Oregon
3	21	85	Tyler Kroft	Tight end	Rutgers
3	35	99	Paul Dawson	Linebacker	TCU
4	21	120	Josh Shaw	Cornerback	USC
4	36	135	Marcus Hardison	Defensive tackle	Arizona State
5	21	157	C. J. Uzomah	Tight end	Auburn
6	21	197	Derron Smith	Safety	Fresno State
7	21	238	Mario Alford	Wide receiver	West Virginia

== 2016 draft ==
Round	Pick #	Overall	Name	Position	College
1	24	24	William Jackson III	Cornerback	Houston
2	24	55	Tyler Boyd	Wide receiver	Pittsburgh
3	24	87	Nick Vigil	Linebacker	Utah State
4	24	122	Andrew Billings	Defensive tackle	Baylor
5	24	161	Christian Westerman	Guard	Arizona State
6	24	199	Cody Core	Wide receiver	Ole Miss
7	24	245	Clayton Fejedelem	Safety	Illinois

== 2017 draft ==
Round	Pick #	Overall	Name	Position	College
1	9	9	John Ross	Wide receiver	Washington
2	16	48	Joe Mixon	Running back	Oklahoma
3	9	73	Jordan Willis	Defensive end	Kansas State
4	9	116	Carl Lawson	Defensive end	Auburn
4	22	128	Josh Malone	Wide receiver	Tennessee
4	32	138	Ryan Glasgow	Defensive tackle	Michigan
5	9	153	Jake Elliott	Kicker	Memphis
5	33	175	J. J. Dielman	Center	Utah
6	9	193	Jordan Evans	Linebacker	Oklahoma
6	23	207	Brandon Wilson	Safety	Houston
7	33	251	Mason Schreck	Tight end	Buffalo

== 2018 draft ==
Round	Pick #	Overall	Name	Position	College
1	21	21	Billy Price	Center	Ohio State
2	22	54	Jessie Bates	Safety	Wake Forest
3	13	77	Sam Hubbard	Defensive end	Ohio State
3	14	78	Malik Jefferson	Linebacker	Texas
4	12	112	Mark Walton	Running back	Miami (FL)
5	14	141	Davontae Harris	Cornerback	Illinois State
5	21	158	Andrew Brown	Defensive tackle	Virginia
5	33	170	Darius Phillips	Cornerback	Western Michigan
7	31	249	Logan Woodside	Quarterback	Toledo
7	34	252	Rod Taylor	Guard	Ole Miss
7	35	253	Auden Tate	Wide receiver	Florida State

== 2019 draft ==
Round	Pick #	Overall	Name	Position	College
1	11	11	Jonah Williams	Offensive tackle	Alabama
2	20	52	Drew Sample	Tight end	Washington
3	8	72	Germaine Pratt	Linebacker	North Carolina State
4	2	104	Ryan Finley	Quarterback	North Carolina State
4	23	125	Renell Wren	Defensive tackle	Arizona State
4	34	136	Michael Jordan	Guard	Ohio State
6	9	182	Trayveon Williams	Running back	Texas A&M
6	38	210	Deshaun Davis	Linebacker	Auburn
6	39	211	Rodney Anderson	Running back	Oklahoma
7	9	223	Jordan Brown	Cornerback	South Dakota State

== 2020 draft ==
Round	Pick #	Overall	Name	Position	College
1	1	1	Joe Burrow	Quarterback	LSU
2	1	33	Tee Higgins	Wide receiver	Clemson
3	1	65	Logan Wilson	Linebacker	Wyoming
4	1	107	Akeem Davis-Gaither	Linebacker	Appalachian State
5	1	147	Khalid Kareem	Defensive end	Notre Dame
6	1	180	Hakeem Adeniji	Offensive tackle	Kansas
7	1	215	Markus Bailey	Linebacker	Purdue

== 2021 draft ==
Round	Pick #	Overall	Name	Position	College
1	5	5	Ja'Marr Chase	Wide receiver	LSU
2	14	46	Jackson Carman	Offensive tackle	Clemson
3	5	69	Joseph Ossai	Defensive end	Texas
4	6	111	Cameron Sample	Defensive end	Tulane
4	17	122	Tyler Shelvin	Defensive tackle	LSU
4	34	139	D'Ante Smith	Offensive tackle	East Carolina
5	5	149	Evan McPherson	Kicker	Florida
6	6	190	Trey Hill	Center	Georgia
6	18	202	Chris Evans	Running back	Michigan
7	7	235	Wyatt Hubert	Defensive end	Kansas State

== 2022 draft ==
Round	Pick #	Overall	Name	Position	College
1	31	31	Daxton Hill	Safety	Michigan
2	28	60	Cam Taylor-Britt	Cornerback	Nebraska
3	31	95	Zachary Carter	Defensive tackle	Florida
4	31	136	Cordell Volson	Offensive tackle	North Dakota State
5	23	166	Tycen Anderson	Safety	Toledo
7	31	252	Jeffrey Gunter	Defensive end	Coastal Carolina

== 2023 draft ==
Round	Pick #	Overall	Name	Position	College
1	28	28	Myles Murphy	Defensive end	Clemson
2	29	60	DJ Turner	Cornerback	Michigan
3	32	95	Jordan Battle	Safety	Alabama
4	29	131	Charlie Jones	Wide receiver	Purdue
5	28	163	Chase Brown	Running back	Illinois
6	29	206	Andrei Iosivas	Wide receiver	Princeton
6	40	217	Brad Robbins	Punter	Michigan
7	29	246	D. J. Ivey	Cornerback	Miami (FL)

== 2024 draft ==
Round	Pick #	Overall	Name	Position	College
1	18	18	Amarius Mims	Offensive tackle	Georgia
2	17	49	Kris Jenkins	Defensive tackle	Michigan
3	16	80	Jermaine Burton	Wide receiver	Alabama
3	34	97	McKinnley Jackson	Defensive tackle	Texas A&M
4	15	115	Erick All	Tight end	Iowa
5	14	149	Josh Newton	Cornerback	TCU
6	18	194	Tanner McLachlan	Tight end	Arizona
6	38	214	Cedric Johnson	Defensive end	Ole Miss
7	4	224	Daijahn Anthony	Safety	Ole Miss
7	17	237	Matt Lee	Center	Miami (FL)

== 2025 draft ==
Round	Pick #	Overall	Name	Position	College
1	17	17	Shemar Stewart	Defensive end	Texas A&M
2	17	49	Demetrius Knight	Linebacker	South Carolina
3	17	81	Dylan Fairchild	Guard	Georgia
4	17	119	Barrett Carter	Linebacker	Clemson
5	17	153	Jalen Rivers	Offensive tackle	Miami (FL)
6	17	193	Tahj Brooks	Running back	Texas Tech

== 2026 draft ==
Round	Pick #	Overall	Name	Position	College
2	9	41	Cashius Howell	Defensive end	Texas A&M
3	8	72	Tacario Davis	Cornerback	Washington
4	28	128	Connor Lew	Center	Auburn
4	40	140	Colbie Young	Wide receiver	Georgia
6	8	189	Brian Parker II	Center	Duke
7	5	221	Jack Endries	Tight end	Texas
7	10	226	Landon Robinson	Defensive tackle	Navy

== See also ==
- History of the Cincinnati Bengals
- List of professional American football drafts
