= 1978 Cincinnati Bengals season =

NFL team season

- General manager: Paul Brown
- Head coach: Bill Johnson and Homer Rice
- Home stadium: Riverfront Stadium

Results
- Record: 4–12
- Division place: 4th AFC Central
- Playoffs: Did not qualify

The 1978 Cincinnati Bengals season was the franchise's 9th season in the National Football League, and the 11th overall.

Ken Anderson missed the first four games with a broken bone in his right hand, and Homer Rice replaced Bill Johnson as head coach after the Bengals started 0–5. The team dipped to marks of 0–8 and 1–12 before rebounding under Rice to win the last three games. In the season finale, the Bengals blasted Cleveland, 48–16, setting series records for points and victory margin.

== Offseason ==
=== NFL draft ===
1978 Cincinnati Bengals draft
Round	Pick	Player	Position	College	Notes
1	8	Ross Browner	Defensive end	Notre Dame	
1	16	Blair Bush	Center	Washington	
2	35	Ray Griffin	Defensive back	Ohio State	
2	45	Deacon Turner	Running back	San Diego State	
3	72	Ted Vincent	Defensive tackle	Wichita State	
3	83	Don Bass	Wide receiver	Houston	
4	99	Dennis Law	Wide receiver	East Tennessee State	
5	126	Tom Dinkel	Linebacker	Kansas	
5	131	Rob Hertel	Quarterback	USC	
6	155	Steve Geise	Running back	Penn State	
7	182	Joe Branson	Defensive back	Livingstone	
7	193	Danny Bass	Guard	Elon	
8	211	Bill Miller	Offensive tackle	Western Illinois	
9	238	Ron Shumon	Linebacker	Wichita State	
10	267	Tom DePaso	Linebacker	Penn State	
11	292	Cal Prince	Running back	Louisville	
11	294	Mark Donahue	Guard	Michigan	
12	323	Kim Featsent	Wide receiver	Kent State	
Made roster

== Personnel ==
=== Staff ===
1978 Cincinnati Bengals staff
Front office: President – John Sawyer; General Manager – Paul Brown; Director of Player Personnel – Pete Brown; Head coaches: Head Coach – Bill Johnson; Offensive coaches: Quarterbacks – Homer Rice; Offensive Backfield – George Sefcik; Receivers – Boyd Dowler; Offensive Line – Mike McCormack	Defensive coaches: Defensive Coordinator/Linebackers – Howard Brinker; Defensive Line – Chuck Studley; Defensive Backfield – Charley Winner; Strength and conditioning: Strength – Kim Wood

=== Roster ===
1978 Cincinnati Bengals roster
Quarterbacks (QB): 14 Ken Anderson; 16 Rob Hertel; 11 John Reaves; Running backs (RB): 42 Boobie Clark; 35 Tony Davis; 36 Lenvil Elliott; 45 Archie Griffin; 46 Pete Johnson; 22 Deacon Turner; Wide receivers (WR): 82 Billy Brooks; 85 Isaac Curtis; 83 Dennis Law; Tight ends (TE): 84 Don Bass; 81 James Corbett; 88 Rick Walker	Offensive linemen (OL): 74 Glenn Bujnoch G; 58 Blair Bush C; 66 Mark Donahue G; 76 Vernon Holland T; 54 Bob Johnson C; 62 Dave Lapham G; 71 Rufus Mayes T; 77 Mike Wilson T; Defensive linemen (DL): 79 Ross Browner DE; 67 Gary Burley DE; 73 Eddie Edwards DT; 78 Ted Vincent DT; 75 Wilson Whitley DT	Linebackers (LB): 50 Glenn Cameron OLB; 56 Tom DePaso OLB; 52 Tom Dinkel OLB; 53 Bo Harris OLB; 55 Jim LeClair MLB; 51 Tom Ruud OLB; 59 Ron Shumon MLB; 57 Reggie Williams OLB; Defensive backs (DB): 34 Louis Breeden CB; 24 Marvin Cobb SS; 44 Ray Griffin CB; 30 Dick Jauron FS; 21 Melvin Morgan CB/S; 32 Scott Perry FS; 13 Ken Riley CB; Special teams (ST): 10 Chris Bahr K; 87 Pat McInally P	Reserve: 72 Ron Hunt T (IR); Rookies in italics

== Regular season ==
=== Schedule ===
Week	Date	Opponent	Result	Record	Venue	Recap
1	September 3	Kansas City Chiefs	**L** 23–24	0–1	Riverfront Stadium	Recap
2	September 10	at **Cleveland Browns**	**L** 10–13 (OT)	0–2	Cleveland Stadium	Recap
3	September 17	**Pittsburgh Steelers**	**L** 3–28	0–3	Riverfront Stadium	Recap
4	September 24	New Orleans Saints	**L** 18–20	0–4	Riverfront Stadium	Recap
5	October 1	at San Francisco 49ers	**L** 12–28	0–5	Candlestick Park	Recap
6	October 9	at Miami Dolphins	**L** 0–21	0–6	Miami Orange Bowl	Recap
7	October 15	New England Patriots	**L** 3–10	0–7	Riverfront Stadium	Recap
8	October 22	at Buffalo Bills	**L** 0–5	0–8	Rich Stadium	Recap
9	October 29	**Houston Oilers**	**W** 28–13	1–8	Riverfront Stadium	Recap
10	November 5	at San Diego Chargers	**L** 13–22	1–9	San Diego Stadium	Recap
11	November 13	Oakland Raiders	**L** 21–34	1–10	Riverfront Stadium	Recap
12	November 19	at **Pittsburgh Steelers**	**L** 6–7	1–11	Three Rivers Stadium	Recap
13	November 26	at **Houston Oilers**	**L** 10–17	1–12	Astrodome	Recap
14	December 3	Atlanta Falcons	**W** 37–7	2–12	Riverfront Stadium	Recap
15	December 11	at Los Angeles Rams	**W** 20–19	3–12	Los Angeles Memorial Coliseum	Recap
16	December 17	**Cleveland Browns**	**W** 48–16	4–12	Riverfront Stadium	Recap
Note: Intra-division opponents are in **bold** text.

=== Standings ===
AFC Central
	W	L	T	PCT	DIV	CONF	PF	PA	STK
^{(1)} Pittsburgh Steelers	14	2	0	.875	5–1	11–1	356	195	W5
^{(5)} Houston Oilers	10	6	0	.625	4–2	8–4	283	298	L1
Cleveland Browns	8	8	0	.500	1–5	4–8	334	356	L1
Cincinnati Bengals	4	12	0	.250	2–4	2–10	252	284	W3

=== Team leaders ===
- Passing: Ken Anderson (319 Att, 173 Comp, 2219 Yds, 54.2 Pct, 10 TD, 22 Int, 58.0 Rating)
- Rushing: Pete Johnson (180 Att, 762 Yds, 4.2 Avg, 50 Long, 7 TD)
- Receiving: Isaac Curtis (47 Rec, 737 Yds, 15.7 Avg, 57 Long, 3 TD)
- Scoring: Chris Bahr, 74 points (16 FG; 26 PAT)

== Awards and records ==
=== Pro Bowl selection ===
- For the first time in team history, the Bengals did not have any players selected to the Pro Bowl.
