= 1976 Cincinnati Bengals season =

NFL team season

- Owner: Paul Brown
- Head coach: Bill Johnson
- Home stadium: Riverfront Stadium

Results
- Record: 10–4
- Division place: 2nd AFC Central
- Playoffs: Did not qualify
- Pro Bowlers: QB Ken Anderson; DE Coy Bacon; S Tommy Casanova; WR Isaac Curtis; LB Jim LeClair; CB Lemar Parrish

The 1976 Cincinnati Bengals season was the franchise's 7th season in the National Football League, and the 9th overall.

Paul Brown had announced his retirement after 41 seasons of coaching and named Bill Johnson, his longtime assistant, as the successor over future San Francisco Head coach Bill Walsh. Brown continued to serve as the club's general manager and vice president. The Bengals acquired defensive end Coy Bacon in a trade with San Diego and drafted halfback Archie Griffin, the two-time Heisman Trophy winner from Ohio State. The Bengals won nine of their first 11 games and finished 10–4, but did not make the playoffs.

== Offseason ==
=== NFL draft ===
1976 Cincinnati Bengals draft
Round	Pick	Player	Position	College	Notes
1	11	Billy Brooks	Wide receiver	Oklahoma	
1	24	Archie Griffin	Running back	Ohio State	
2	38	Glenn Bujnoch	Guard	Texas A&M	
2	51	Chris Bahr	Placekicker	Penn State	
3	69	Danny Reece	Defensive back	USC	
3	82	Reggie Williams	Linebacker	Dartmouth	
4	106	Tony Davis	Running back	Nebraska	
4	116	Greg Fairchild	Guard	Tulsa	
5	138	Willie Shelby	Running back	Alabama	
5	147	Scott Perry	Defensive back	Williams	
6	176	Orlando Nelson	Tight end	Utah State	
7	187	Bob Bateman	Quarterback	Brown	
7	192	Carmen Rome	Defensive back	Miami (OH)	
7	205	Ken Kuhn	Linebacker	Ohio State	
8	232	Ron Hunt	Offensive tackle	Oregon	
9	259	Lonnie Allgood	Wide receiver	Syracuse	
10	287	Tom Klaban	Placekicker	Ohio State	
11	314	Melvin Morgan	Defensive back	Mississippi Valley State	
12	341	Joe Dale Harris	Wide receiver	Alabama	
13	371	Randy Walker	Running back	Miami (OH)	
14	398	Greg Coleman	Punter	Florida A&M	
15	425	Lynn Hieber	Quarterback	Indiana (PA)	
16	455	George Demopoulis	Center	Miami (FL)	
17	482	Scott Dannelley	Guard	Ohio State	
Made roster

== Personnel ==
=== Staff ===
1976 Cincinnati Bengals staff
Front office: President – John Sawyer; General manager – Paul Brown; Director of player personnel – Pete Brown; Head coaches: Head coach – Bill Johnson; Offensive coaches: Quarterbacks/Receivers – Boyd Dowler; Offensive backfield – Jack Donaldson; Offensive line – Mike McCormack	Defensive coaches: Defensive coordinator – Howard Brinker; Defensive line – Chuck Studley; Defensive backfield – Charley Winner; Strength and conditioning: Strength – Kim Wood

=== Roster ===
1976 Cincinnati Bengals roster
Quarterbacks (QB): 14 Ken Anderson; 11 John Reaves; Running backs (RB): 42 Boobie Clark; 35 Tony Davis; 36 Lenvil Elliott; 33 Stan Fritts; 45 Archie Griffin; 30 Willie Shelby; Wide receivers (WR): 82 Billy Brooks; 85 Isaac Curtis; 86 John McDaniel; 25 Chip Myers; Tight ends (TE): 88 Bruce Coslet; 84 Bob Trumpy	Offensive linemen (OL): 74 Glenn Bujnoch G; 63 Greg Fairchild G; 76 Vernon Holland T; 72 Ron Hunt T; 54 Bob Johnson C; 62 Dave Lapham G; 71 Rufus Mayes T; 64 John Shinners G; Defensive linemen (DL): 79 Coy Bacon DE; 78 Bob Brown DT; 67 Gary Burley DE; 70 Ron Carpenter DT; 80 Ken Johnson DE; 68 Bill Kollar DT	Linebackers (LB): 50 Glenn Cameron OLB; 51 Chris Devlin OLB; 53 Bo Harris OLB; 55 Jim LeClair MLB; 60 Ron Pritchard OLB; 57 Reggie Williams OLB; Defensive backs (DB): 37 Tommy Casanova SS; 24 Marvin Cobb FS; 23 Bernard Jackson S; 21 Melvin Morgan CB; 20 Lemar Parrish CB; 32 Scott Perry CB; 13 Ken Riley CB; Special teams (ST): 10 Chris Bahr K; 87 Pat McInally P	Reserve: 56 Ken Kuhn LB (IR); Rookies in italics

== Regular season ==
=== Schedule ===
Week	Date	Opponent	Result	Record	Venue	Recap
1	September 12	Denver Broncos	**W** 17–7	1–0	Riverfront Stadium	Recap
2	September 19	at Baltimore Colts	**L** 27–28	1–1	Memorial Stadium	Recap
3	September 26	Green Bay Packers	**W** 28–7	2–1	Riverfront Stadium	Recap
4	October 3	at **Cleveland Browns**	**W** 45–24	3–1	Cleveland Stadium	Recap
5	October 10	Tampa Bay Buccaneers	**W** 21–0	4–1	Riverfront Stadium	Recap
6	October 17	at **Pittsburgh Steelers**	**L** 6–23	4–2	Three Rivers Stadium	Recap
7	October 24	at **Houston Oilers**	**W** 27–7	5–2	Astrodome	Recap
8	October 31	**Cleveland Browns**	**W** 21–6	6–2	Riverfront Stadium	Recap
9	November 8	Los Angeles Rams	**W** 20–12	7–2	Riverfront Stadium	Recap
10	November 14	**Houston Oilers**	**W** 31–27	8–2	Riverfront Stadium	Recap
11	November 21	at Kansas City Chiefs	**W** 27–24	9–2	Arrowhead Stadium	Recap
12	November 28	**Pittsburgh Steelers**	**L** 3–7	9–3	Riverfront Stadium	Recap
13	December 6	at Oakland Raiders	**L** 20–35	9–4	Oakland Coliseum	Recap
14	December 12	at New York Jets	**W** 42–3	10–4	Shea Stadium	Recap
Note: Intra-division opponents are in **bold** text.

=== Standings ===
AFC Central
	W	L	T	PCT	DIV	CONF	PF	PA	STK
^{(3)} Pittsburgh Steelers	10	4	0	.714	5–1	9–3	342	138	W9
Cincinnati Bengals	10	4	0	.714	4–2	8–4	335	210	W1
Cleveland Browns	9	5	0	.643	3–3	7–5	267	287	L1
Houston Oilers	5	9	0	.357	0–6	3–9	222	273	L2

=== Team stats ===
1976 Cincinnati Bengals Team Stats
TEAM STATS	Bengals	Opponents
TOTAL FIRST DOWNS		
Rushing		
Passing		
Penalty		
TOTAL NET YARDS		
Avg Per Game		
Total Plays		
Avg. Per Play		
NET YARDS RUSHING		
Avg. Per Game		
Total Rushes		
NET YARDS PASSING		
Avg. Per Game		
Sacked Yards Lost		
Gross Yards		
Att. Completions		
Completion Pct.		
Intercepted		
PUNTS-AVERAGE		
PENALTIES-YARDS		
FUMBLES-BALL LOST		
TOUCHDOWNS		
Rushing		
Passing		
Returns		

Score by Periods	1	2	3	4	Tot
Bengals					
Opponents					

=== Team leaders ===
- Passing: Ken Anderson (338 Att, 179 Comp, 2367 Yds, 53.0 Pct, 19 TD, 14 Int, 76.9 Rating)
- Rushing: Boobie Clark (151 Att, 671 Yds, 4.4 Avg, 24 Long, 7 TD)
- Receiving: Isaac Curtis (41 Rec, 766 Yds, 18.7 Avg, 85 Long, 6 TD)
- Scoring: Chris Bahr, 81 points (14 FG; 39 PAT)

== Awards and records ==
- Ken Riley, Franchise Record, Most Interceptions in One Season, (9)

=== Pro Bowl selections ===
- QB Ken Anderson
- DE Coy Bacon
- S Tommy Casanova
- WR Isaac Curtis
- LB Jim LeClair
- CB Lemar Parrish
