= 1977 Cincinnati Bengals season =

NFL team season

- Owner: Paul Brown
- Head coach: Bill Johnson
- Home stadium: Riverfront Stadium

Results
- Record: 8–6
- Division place: 2nd AFC Central
- Playoffs: Did not qualify

The 1977 Cincinnati Bengals season was the franchise's 8th season in the National Football League, and the 10th overall. Second-year Running Back Archie Griffin struggled to learn the NFL game rushing for only 549 yards while failing to cross the end zone. A loss to Houston in the final game cost the Bengals a spot in the playoffs. The team finished with an 8–6 record.

== Offseason ==
=== NFL draft ===
1977 Cincinnati Bengals draft
Round	Pick	Player	Position	College	Notes
1	3	Eddie Edwards	Defensive end	Miami (FL)	
1	8	Wilson Whitley	Defensive tackle	Houston	
1	22	Mike Cobb	Tight end	Michigan State	
2	49	Pete Johnson *	Running back	Ohio State	
3	76	Mike Voight	Running back	North Carolina	
4	85	Rick Walker	Tight end	UCLA	
4	103	Mike Wilson	Offensive tackle	Georgia	
4	105	Jerry Anderson	Defensive back	Oklahoma	
5	133	Ray Phillips	Linebacker	Nebraska	
6	160	Tommy Duniven	Quarterback	Texas Tech	
7	187	Louis Breeden *	Defensive back	North Carolina Central	
7	194	Jim Corbett	Tight end	Pittsburgh	
8	214	Jose St. Victor	Guard	Syracuse	
9	245	Willie Zachary	Wide receiver	Central State (OH)	
10	272	Bob Bialik	Punter	Hillsdale	
11	292	Joel Parrish	Guard	Georgia	
11	299	Carl Allen	Defensive back	Southern Miss	
12	326	Alex Percival	Wide receiver	Morehouse	
Made roster * Made at least one Pro Bowl during career

== Personnel ==
=== Staff ===
1977 Cincinnati Bengals staff
Front office: President – John Sawyer; General Manager – Paul Brown; Director of Player Personnel – Pete Brown; Head coaches: Head Coach – Bill Johnson; Offensive coaches: Quarterbacks/Receivers – Boyd Dowler; Offensive Backfield – Jack Donaldson; Offensive Line – Mike McCormack	Defensive coaches: Defensive Coordinator/Linebackers – Howard Brinker; Defensive Line – Chuck Studley; Defensive Backfield – Charley Winner; Strength and conditioning: Strength – Kim Wood

=== Roster ===
1977 Cincinnati Bengals roster
Quarterbacks (QB): 14 Ken Anderson; 11 John Reaves; 15 Mike Wells; Running backs (RB): 42 Boobie Clark; 35 Tony Davis; 36 Lenvil Elliott; 45 Archie Griffin; 46 Pete Johnson; 30 Willie Shelby; Wide receivers (WR): 82 Billy Brooks; 83 Steve Holden; 86 John McDaniel; Tight ends (TE): 89 Mike Cobb; 81 James Corbett; 84 Bob Trumpy; 88 Rick Walker	Offensive linemen (OL): 74 Glenn Bujnoch G; 63 Greg Fairchild G/C; 76 Vernon Holland T; 72 Ron Hunt T; 54 Bob Johnson C; 62 Dave Lapham G; 71 Rufus Mayes T; 64 John Shinners G; Defensive linemen (DL): 79 Coy Bacon DE; 67 Gary Burley DE; 73 Eddie Edwards DE; 80 Ken Johnson DE; 78 Walter Johnson DT; 75 Wilson Whitley DT	Linebackers (LB): 50 Glenn Cameron MLB; 53 Bo Harris OLB; 55 Jim LeClair MLB; 59 Ray Phillips OLB; 57 Reggie Williams OLB; Defensive backs (DB): 31 Jerry Anderson SS; 37 Tommy Casanova SS; 24 Marvin Cobb FS; 21 Melvin Morgan CB/S; 20 Lemar Parrish CB; 32 Scott Perry CB; 13 Ken Riley CB; Special teams (ST): 10 Chris Bahr K; 87 Pat McInally P	Reserve: 34 Louis Breeden CB (IR); 85 Isaac Curtis WR (IR); 51 Chris Devlin LB (IR); 60 Ron Pritchard LB (IR); Rookies in italics

== Regular season ==
=== Schedule ===
Week	Date	Opponent	Result	Record	Venue	Attendance
1	September 18	**Cleveland Browns**	**L** 3–13	0–1	Riverfront Stadium	52,847
2	September 25	Seattle Seahawks	**W** 42–20	1–1	Riverfront Stadium	45,579
3	October 2	at San Diego Chargers	**L** 3–24	1–2	San Diego Stadium	40,352
4	October 9	at Green Bay Packers	**W** 17–7	2–2	Milwaukee County Stadium	53,653
5	October 17	at **Pittsburgh Steelers**	**L** 14–20	2–3	Three Rivers Stadium	47,950
6	October 23	Denver Broncos	**L** 13–24	2–4	Riverfront Stadium	54,395
7	October 30	**Houston Oilers**	**W** 13–10 (OT)	3–4	Riverfront Stadium	53,194
8	November 6	at **Cleveland Browns**	**W** 10–7	4–4	Cleveland Municipal Stadium	81,932
9	November 13	at Minnesota Vikings	**L** 10–42	4–5	Metropolitan Stadium	45,371
10	November 20	Miami Dolphins	**W** 23–17	5–5	Riverfront Stadium	46,733
11	November 27	New York Giants	**W** 30–13	6–5	Riverfront Stadium	32,705
12	December 4	at Kansas City Chiefs	**W** 27–7	7–5	Arrowhead Stadium	38,488
13	December 10	**Pittsburgh Steelers**	**W** 17–10	8–5	Riverfront Stadium	36,133
14	December 18	at **Houston Oilers**	**L** 16–21	8–6	Astrodome	46,212
Note: Intra-division opponents are in **bold** text.

=== Season summary ===
==== Week 5 at Steelers ====
Week Five: Cincinnati Bengals (2–2) at Pittsburgh Steelers (2–2)

Quarter	1	2	3	4	Total
Bengals	0	7	0	7	**14**
**Steelers**	0	13	0	7	**20**

at Three Rivers Stadium, Pittsburgh, Pennsylvania

- Date: October 17
- Game time: 9:00 p.m. EST
- Game weather: 39 °F (4 °C)
- Game attendance: 47,950
- TV announcers (ABC): Frank Gifford, Don Meredith, and Howard Cosell
- Box Score

Game information

**First quarter**

- No scoring

**Second quarter**

- PIT – Rocky Bleier 1-yard run (Roy Gerela kick). Steelers 7–0.
- PIT – Rocky Bleier 2-yard run (kick failed). Steelers 13–0.
- CIN – Glenn Bujnoch 4-yard run (Chris Bahr kick). Steelers 13–7.

**Third quarter**

- No scoring

**Fourth quarter**

- PIT – Sidney Thornton 1-yard run (Roy Gerela kick). Steelers 20–7.
- CIN – Reggie Williams recovered special teams fumble in end zone. Steelers 20–14.

Top passers

- CIN – John Reaves – 8/25, 142 yards, 3 INT
- PIT – Terry Bradshaw – 6/9, 117 yards

Top rushers

- CIN – Lenvil Elliott – 13 rushes, 44 yards
- PIT – Franco Harris – 16 rushes, 73 yards

Top receivers

- CIN – Isaac Curtis – 5 receptions, 88 yards
- PIT – Bennie Cunningham – 2 receptions, 49 yards

Bob Trumpy was knocked out of the game by Mel Blount

==== Week 8 ====
Team	1	2	3	4	Total
• **Bengals**	7	0	3	0	10
Browns	0	7	0	0	7

- Date: November 6
- Location: Cleveland Municipal Stadium, Cleveland, Ohio
- Game start: 1:00 p.m.
- Game weather: 67 °F (19 °C) • Wind 11 mph (18 km/h)

Scoring summary
1	CIN	Pete Johnson 11 yard run (Chris Bahr kick)	Bengals 7–0
2	CLE	Oscar Roan 4 yard pass from Brian Sipe (Don Cockroft kick)	Tie 7–7
3	CIN	Chris Bahr 47 yard field goal	Bengals 10–7

==== Week 11 ====
Team	1	2	3	4	Total
Giants	0	6	0	7	13
• **Bengals**	20	7	0	3	30

- Date: November 27
- Location: Riverfront Stadium • Cincinnati
- Game start: 1:00 p.m.
- Game attendance: 32,705
- Game weather: Snow • 20 °F (−7 °C) • Wind 10 mph (16 km/h)
- TV announcers (CBS): Lindsey Nelson and Paul Hornung

Scoring summary
1	CIN	Billy Brooks 58 yard pass from Ken Anderson (Chris Bahr kick)	Bengals 7–0
1	CIN	Boobie Clark 10 yard run (Chris Bahr kick)	Bengals 14–0
1	CIN	Billy Brooks 30 yard pass from Ken Anderson (kick failed)	Bengals 20–0
2	CIN	Jim Corbett 47 yard pass from Ken Anderson (Chris Bahr kick)	Bengals 27–0
2	NYG	Jimmy Robinson 5 yard pass from Joe Pisarcik (kick failed)	Bengals 27–6
4	CIN	Chris Bahr 32 yard field goal	Bengals 30–6
4	NYG	Joe Pisarcik 1 yard run (Joe Danelo kick)	Bengals 30–13

=== Standings ===
AFC Central
	W	L	T	PCT	DIV	CONF	PF	PA	STK
^{(3)} Pittsburgh Steelers	9	5	0	.643	4–2	7–5	283	243	W1
Houston Oilers	8	6	0	.571	3–3	6–6	299	230	W2
Cincinnati Bengals	8	6	0	.571	3–3	6–5	238	235	L1
Cleveland Browns	6	8	0	.429	2–4	5–7	269	267	L4
