= List of Cincinnati Bengals first-round draft picks =

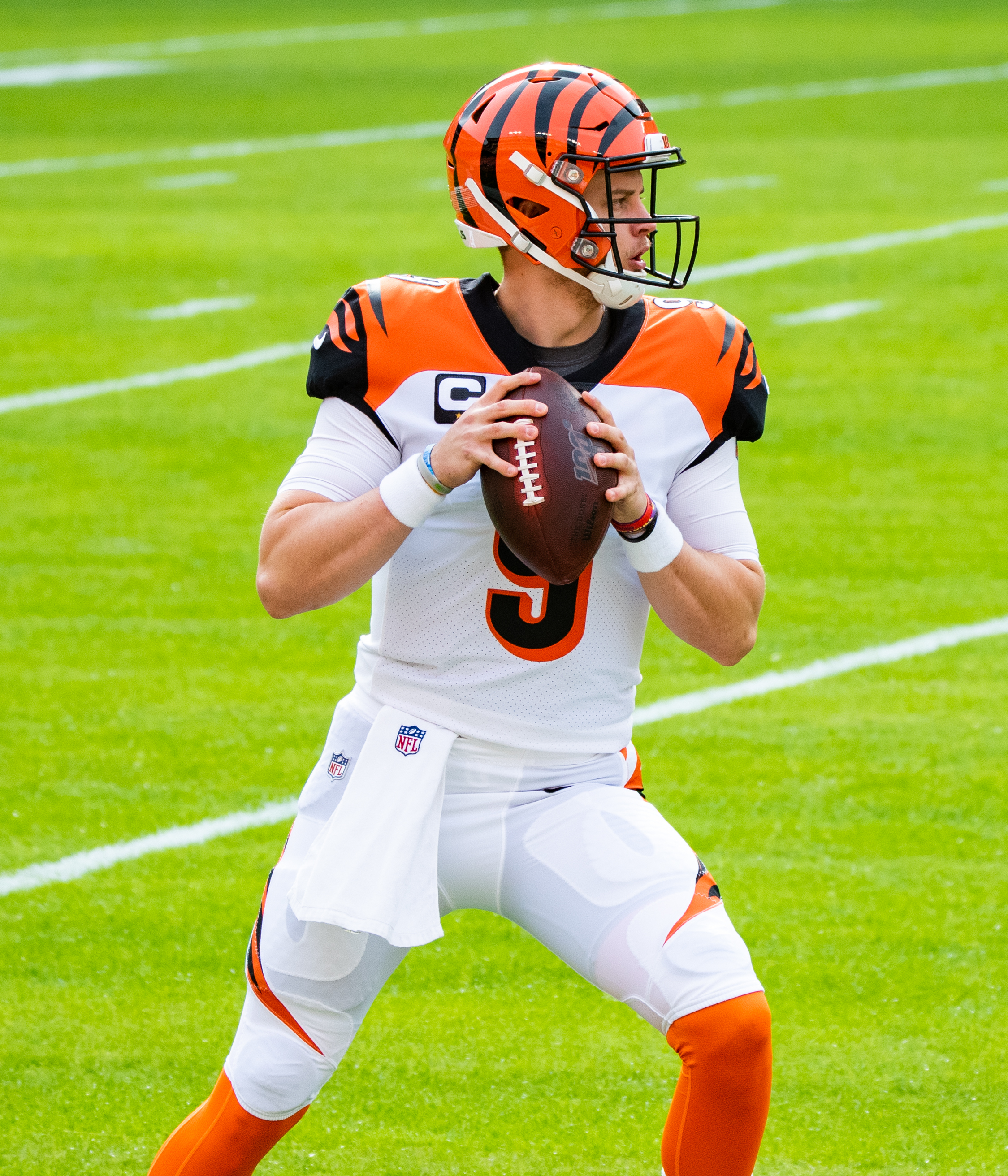
Quarterback Joe Burrow was the first overall pick in the 2020 NFL draft. After being injured during his rookie season, Burrow was named the 2021 AP NFL Comeback Player of the Year.

The Cincinnati Bengals are a professional American football team based in Cincinnati, Ohio. The Bengals compete in the National Football League (NFL) as a member club of the American Football Conference North Division. Founded as an expansion team of the American Football League (AFL) in 1968, they joined the NFL as a result of the 1970 AFL–NFL merger. The team's home games have been held in downtown Cincinnati at Paycor Stadium since 2000.

The NFL draft, officially known as the "NFL Annual Player Selection Meeting", is an annual event which serves as the league's most common source of player recruitment. The draft order is determined based on the previous season's standings; the teams with the worst win–loss records receive the earliest picks. Teams that qualified for the NFL playoffs select after non-qualifiers, and their order depends on how far they advanced, using their regular season record as a tie-breaker. The final two selections in the first round are reserved for the Super Bowl runner-up and champion. Draft picks are tradable and players or other picks can be acquired with them.

Since the team's first draft in 1968, the Bengals have selected 69 players in the first round. The team's first-round pick in their inaugural draft was Bob Johnson, a center from the University of Tennessee; he was the second overall selection. The Bengals have drafted number one overall four times and selected Dan Wilkinson in 1994, Ki-Jana Carter in 1995, Carson Palmer in 2003, and Joe Burrow in 2020. In the most recent draft, held in 2025, the Bengals chose Texas A&M defensive end Shemar Stewart.

The Bengals have drafted at least one player in the first round every year except for 1989. Only one of the team's first-round picks—Anthony Muñoz—has been elected to the Pro Football Hall of Fame.

== Player selections ==
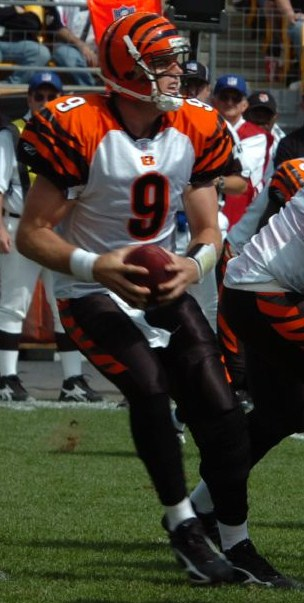
Quarterback Carson Palmer was the first overall pick in the 2003 NFL draft. Palmer spent seven seasons with the team, during which time he was selected to two Pro Bowls and led the league in passing touchdowns during the 2005 NFL season.

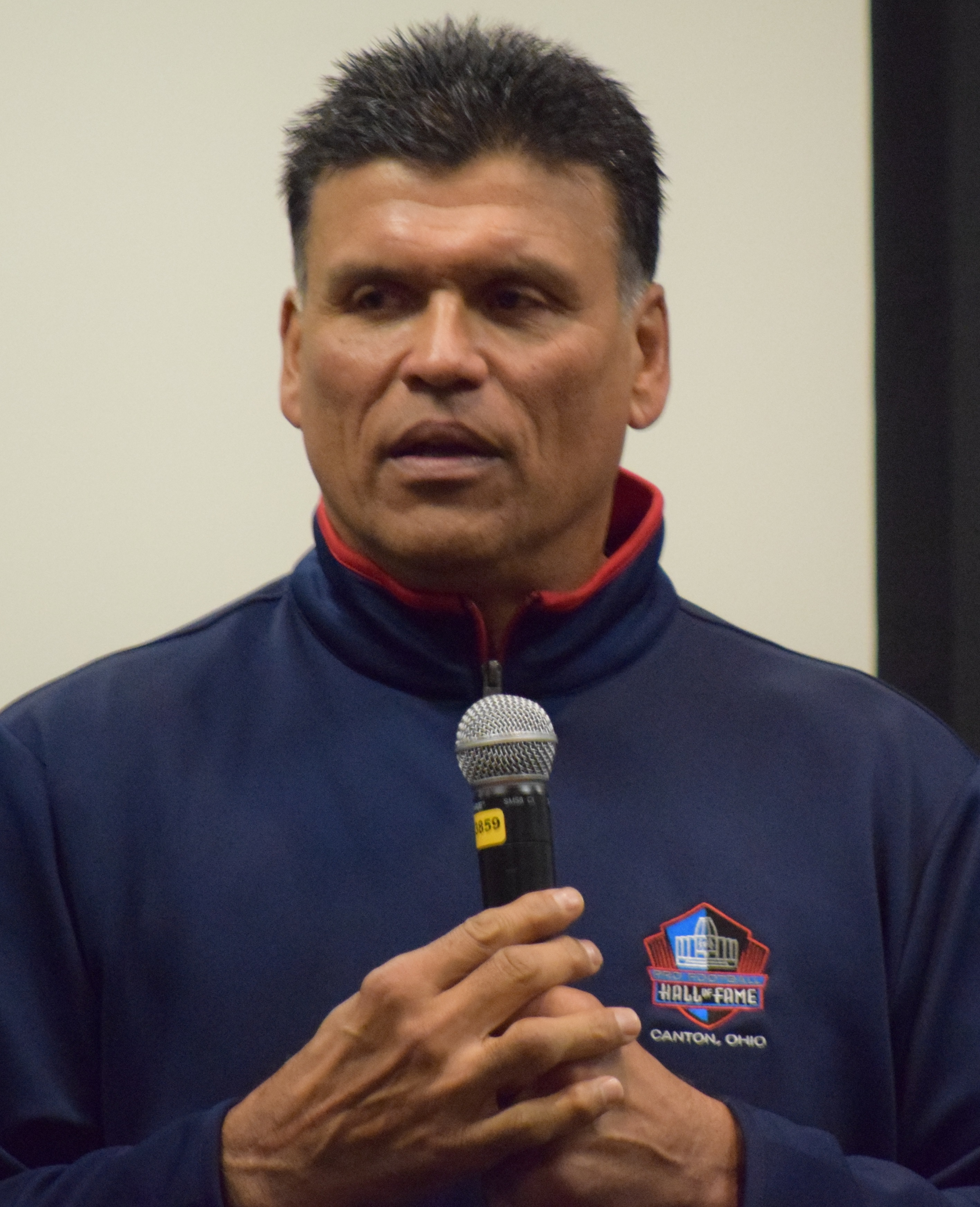
Offensive tackle Anthony Muñoz was drafted with the third pick of the 1980 NFL draft. During his 13 seasons with the team, he was an 11-time All-Pro, 11-time Pro Bowler, and the 1991 NFL Man of the Year. He was inducted into the Hall of Fame in 1998 and was selected to the NFL 100th Anniversary All-Time Team.

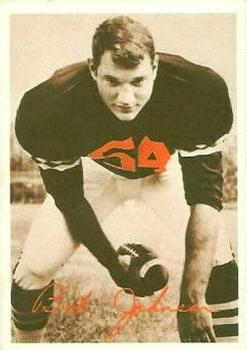
Center Bob Johnson was the Bengals' first ever pick, selected second overall in 1968. He was an AFL All-Star during his rookie season and the Bengals retired the number 54 jersey in his honor.

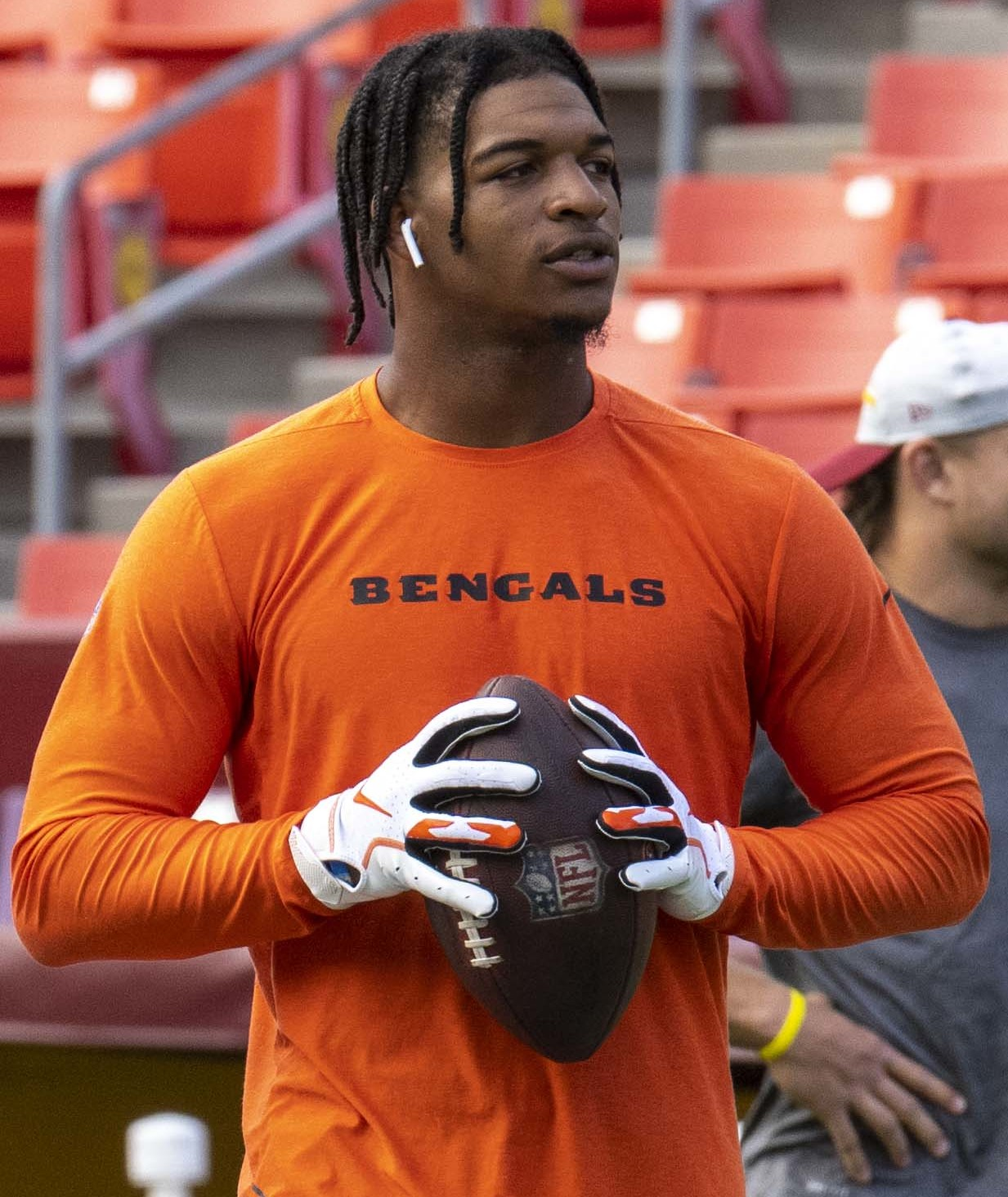
Ja'Marr Chase is a wide receiver who was drafted fifth overall in the 2021 NFL draft. Since then, he has been a three-time Pro Bowler, a second-team All-Pro, and was named the 2021 Offensive Rookie of the Year.

Key
| Symbol | Meaning |
|---|---|
| † | Inducted into the Pro Football Hall of Fame |
| * | Selected number one overall |

Position abbreviations
| C | Center |
| DB | Defensive back |
| DE | Defensive end |
| DL | Defensive line |
| DT | Defensive tackle |
| G | Guard |
| LB | Linebacker |
| NT | Nose tackle |
| QB | Quarterback |
| RB | Running back |
| T | Tackle |
| TE | Tight end |
| WR | Wide receiver |

Cincinnati Bengals first-round draft picks by season
| Season | Pick | Player | Position | College | Notes |
|---|---|---|---|---|---|
| 1968 | 2 | Bob Johnson | C | Tennessee | Received two first-round selections, among other selections, as an expansion team. (Note: Cincinnati received the second and last selections in the first-round of the 1968 NFL/AFL draft due to their status as an incoming expansion team (Nos. 2 and 27 overall).) Traded a pick to Miami Dolphins. (Note: Cincinnati traded a 1968 first- and second-round selection (Nos. 27 and 54 overall) to the Miami Dolphins in exchange for quarterback John Stofa.) |
| 1969 | 5 | Greg Cook | QB | Cincinnati | |
| 1970 | 7 | Mike Reid | DT | Penn State | |
| 1971 | 15 | Vernon Holland | T | Tennessee State | |
| 1972 | 2 | Sherman White | DE | California | |
| 1973 | 15 | Isaac Curtis | WR | San Diego State | |
| 1974 | 23 | Bill Kollar | DE | Montana State | |
| 1975 | 14 | Glenn Cameron | DE | Florida | |
| 1976 | 11 | Billy Brooks | WR | Oklahoma | Pick received from Philadelphia Eagles (Note: Cincinnati traded quarterback Mike Boryla to the Philadelphia Eagles in exchange for their 1975 sixth-round selection (No. 142 overall) and 1976 first-round selection (No. 11 overall).) |
| 1976 | 24 | Archie Griffin | RB | Ohio State | |
| 1977 | 3 | Eddie Edwards | DE | Miami (FL) | Pick received from Buffalo Bills (Note: Cincinnati traded defensive end Sherman White to the Buffalo Bills in exchange for their 1977 first-round selection (No. 3 overall).) |
| 1977 | 8 | Wilson Whitley | DT | Houston | Pick received from Philadelphia Eagles (Note: Cincinnati traded linebacker Bill Bergey to the Philadelphia Eagles in exchange for their 1977 first-round selection (No. 8 overall) and 1978 first- and second-round selections (Nos. 8 and 35 overall).) |
| 1977 | 22 | Mike Cobb | TE | Michigan State | |
| 1978 | 8 | Ross Browner | DE | Notre Dame | Pick received from Philadelphia Eagles |
| 1978 | 16 | Blair Bush | C | Washington | |
| 1979 | 3 | Jack Thompson | QB | Washington State | |
| 1979 | 12 | Charles Alexander | RB | Louisiana State | Pick received from Washington Redskins (Note: Cincinnati traded defensive back Lemar Parrish and defensive end Coy Bacon to the Washington Redskins in exchange for their 1979 first-round selection (No. 12 overall).) |
| 1980 | 3 | Anthony Muñoz† | T | USC | |
| 1981 | 10 | David Verser | WR | Kansas | |
| 1982 | 26 | Glen Collins | DE | Mississippi State | |
| 1983 | 25 | Dave Rimington | C | Nebraska | |
| 1984 | 7 | Ricky Hunley | LB | Arizona | |
| 1984 | 16 | Pete Koch | NT | Maryland | Pick received from New England Patriots (Note: Cincinnati traded a 1984 first-round selection (No. 1 overall, received from Tampa Bay Buccaneers) (Note: Cincinnati traded quarterback Jack Thompson to the Tampa Bay Buccaneers in exchange for their 1984 first-round selection (No. 1 overall).) to the New England Patriots in exchange for two 1984 first-round selections, a tenth-round selection (Nos. 16, 28, and 265 overall), and a 1985 fifth-round selection (No. 129 overall).) using pick from Tampa Bay Buccaneers |
| 1984 | 28 | Brian Blados | T | North Carolina | Pick received from New England Patriots using pick from Tampa Bay Buccaneers |
| 1985 | 13 | Eddie Brown | WR | Miami (FL) | |
| 1985 | 25 | Emanuel King | LB | Alabama | Pick received from Seattle Seahawks (Note: Cincinnati traded center Blair Bush to the Seattle Seahawks in exchange for their 1985 first-round selection (No. 25 overall).) |
| 1986 | 11 | Joe Kelly | LB | Washington | |
| 1986 | 21 | Tim McGee | WR | Tennessee | Pick received from Denver Broncos (Note: Cincinnati traded the rights to linebacker Ricky Hunley to the Denver Broncos in exchange for their 1986 first- and third-round selection (Nos. 21 and 78 overall) and 1987 fifth-round selection (No. 139 overall).) |
| 1987 | 17 | Jason Buck | DL | BYU | |
| 1988 | 5 | Rickey Dixon | DB | Oklahoma | |
| 1989 | No pick | | | | Moved down draft order in trade with Atlanta Falcons (Note: Cincinnati traded their 1989 second-, fourth-, and tenth-round selections (Nos. 35, 89, and 256 overall) to the Atlanta Falcons in exchange for their 1989 first-round selection (No. 27 overall).) |
| 1990 | 12 | James Francis | LB | Baylor | |
| 1991 | 18 | Alfred Williams | DE | Colorado | |
| 1992 | 6 | David Klingler | QB | Houston | Moved down in trade with Washington Redskins (Note: Cincinnati traded their 1992 first- and third-round selections (Nos. 4 and 58 overall) to the Washington Redskins in exchange for their 1992 third- and two first-round selections (Nos. 6, 28, and 84 overall).) |
| 1992 | 28 | Darryl Williams | DB | Miami (FL) | Moved up draft order in trade with Washington Redskins |
| 1993 | 5 | John Copeland | DE | Alabama | |
| 1994 | 1 | Dan Wilkinson* | DT | Ohio State | |
| 1995 | 1 | Ki-Jana Carter* | RB | Penn State | Moved up draft order in trade with Carolina Panthers (Note: Cincinnati traded their 1995 first- and second-round selections (Nos. 5 and 36 overall) to the Carolina Panthers in exchange for their 1995 first-round selection (No. 1 overall).) |
| 1996 | 10 | Willie Anderson | T | Auburn | |
| 1997 | 14 | Reinard Wilson | LB | Florida State | |
| 1998 | 13 | Takeo Spikes | LB | Auburn | Pick received from Washington Redskins (Note: Cincinnati traded quarterback Dan Wilkinson to the Washington Redskins in exchange for their 1998 first- and third-round selections (Nos. 17 and 78 overall).) |
| 1998 | 17 | Brian Simmons | LB | North Carolina | |
| 1999 | 3 | Akili Smith | QB | Oregon | |
| 2000 | 4 | Peter Warrick | WR | Florida State | |
| 2001 | 4 | Justin Smith | DE | Missouri | |
| 2002 | 10 | Levi Jones | T | Arizona | |
| 2003 | 1 | Carson Palmer* | QB | USC | |
| 2004 | 26 | Chris Perry | RB | Michigan | Moved down draft order in trades with Denver Broncos (Note: Cincinnati traded their 2004 first-round selection (No. 17 overall) to the Denver Broncos in exchange for their 2004 first- and fourth-round selections (Nos. 24 and 117 overall).) and St. Louis Rams (Note: Cincinnati traded a 2004 first-round selection (No. 24 overall, received from the Denver Broncos) to the St. Louis Rams in exchange for their 2004 first- and fourth-round selections (Nos. 26 and 123 overall).) |
| 2005 | 17 | David Pollack | LB | Georgia | |
| 2006 | 24 | Johnathan Joseph | DB | South Carolina | |
| 2007 | 18 | Leon Hall | DB | Michigan | |
| 2008 | 9 | Keith Rivers | LB | USC | |
| 2009 | 6 | Andre Smith | T | Alabama | |
| 2010 | 21 | Jermaine Gresham | TE | Oklahoma | |
| 2011 | 4 | A. J. Green | WR | Georgia | |
| 2012 | 17 | Dre Kirkpatrick | DB | Alabama | Pick received from Oakland Raiders (Note: Cincinnati traded quarterback Carson Palmer to the Oakland Raiders in exchange for their 2012 first-round selection (No. 17 overall) and 2013 second-round selection (No. 37 overall).) |
| 2012 | 27 | Kevin Zeitler | G | Wisconsin | Moved up draft order in trade with New England Patriots (Note: Cincinnati traded their 2012 first-round selection (No. 21 overall) to the New England Patriots in exchange for their 2011 first-round selection (No. 27 overall) and 2012 third-round selection (No. 93 overall).) |
| 2013 | 21 | Tyler Eifert | TE | Notre Dame | |
| 2014 | 24 | Darqueze Dennard | DB | Michigan State | |
| 2015 | 21 | Cedric Ogbuehi | T | Texas A&M | |
| 2016 | 24 | William Jackson III | DB | Houston | |
| 2017 | 9 | John Ross | WR | Washington | |
| 2018 | 21 | Billy Price | C | Ohio State | Moved down draft order in trade with Buffalo Bills (Note: Cincinnati traded their 2018 first- and sixth-round selections (Nos. 12 and 187 overall) to the Buffalo Bills in exchange for their 2018 first- and fifth-round selections (Nos. 21 and 158 overall).) |
| 2019 | 11 | Jonah Williams | T | Alabama | |
| 2020 | 1 | Joe Burrow* | QB | LSU | |
| 2021 | 5 | Ja'Marr Chase | WR | LSU | |
| 2022 | 31 | Daxton Hill | DB | Michigan | |
| 2023 | 28 | Myles Murphy | DE | Clemson | |
| 2024 | 18 | Amarius Mims | T | Georgia | |
| 2025 | 17 | Shemar Stewart | DE | Texas A&M | |
| 2026 | No pick | | | | Pick traded to New York Giants (Note: Cincinnati traded a first-round selection (10th overall) to the NY Giants in exchange for DT Dexter Lawrence.) |

== See also ==
- Cincinnati Bengals draft history
- History of the Cincinnati Bengals
- List of Cincinnati Bengals seasons
