= List of Brown Bears in the NFL draft =

This is a list of Brown Bears football players in the NFL draft.

== Key ==
B	Back	K	Kicker	NT	Nose tackle
C	Center	LB	Linebacker	FB	Fullback
DB	Defensive back	P	Punter	HB	Halfback
DE	Defensive end	QB	Quarterback	WR	Wide receiver
DT	Defensive tackle	RB	Running back	G	Guard
E	End	T	Offensive tackle	TE	Tight end

== Selections ==
Year	Round	Pick	Overall	Player	Team	Position
1939	16	4	144	Irv Hall	Philadelphia Eagles	B
1940	3	10	25	John McLaughry	New York Giants	B
1943	19	5	175	Jay Fidler	Cleveland Rams	T
1944	6	4	47	Dan Savage	Pittsburgh Steelers	B
1944	21	8	216	Hank Margarita	Chicago Bears	B
1945	21	9	217	Phil Teschner	Philadelphia Eagles	T
1945	28	10	295	Charley Anthony	New York Giants	B
1946	6	5	45	Jim Lalikos	New York Giants	T
1946	17	2	152	Charley Tiedeman	Boston Yanks	B
1947	24	7	222	Tom Dorsey	Chicago Cardinals	B
1950	3	1	28	Don Colo	Baltimore Colts	T
1950	12	4	148	Bucky Walters	Detroit Lions	T
1950	12	13	157	Frank Mahoney	Philadelphia Eagles	E
1951	9	8	106	Don Colo	New York Yanks	T
1952	28	11	336	John Pietro	Cleveland Browns	G
1958	10	2	111	Gil Robertshaw	Chicago Cardinals	T
1960	12	8	140	Tom Budrewicz	Chicago Bears	T
1966	5	12	76	Bob Hall	Minnesota Vikings	DB
1967	7	16	175	Joe Randall (American football)	St. Louis Cardinals	K
1976	7	5	187	Bob Bateman	Cincinnati Bengals	QB
1979	12	10	313	Bob Forster	Detroit Lions	C
1980	3	4	60	John Sinnott	St. Louis Cardinals	T
1981	6	4	142	John Woodring	New York Jets	LB
1982	7	12	179	Steve Jordan	Minnesota Vikings	TE
1999	7	35	241	Sean Morey	New England Patriots	WR
2007	4	17	116	Zak DeOssie	New York Giants	LB
2010	7	34	241	David Howard	Tennessee Titans	DT

== Undrafted players ==
Note: No drafts held before 1920

Debut year	Player name	Debut NFL/AFL team	Position	Notes
1962	Dave Zucconi	Boston Patriots	RB	—
2022	E. J. Perry	Jacksonville Jaguars	QB	—
