= Larry Barnes (running back) =

American football player (born 1954)

No. 35, 33, 38
- Position: Running back

Personal information
- Born: July 17, 1954; Bessemer, Alabama, U.S.
- Listed height: 5 ft 11 in (1.80 m)
- Listed weight: 220 lb (100 kg)

Career information
- High school: Jess Lanier (AL)
- College: Tennessee State
- NFL draft: 1977: 6th round, 151st overall pick

Career history
- San Diego Chargers (1977-1978); St Louis Cardinals (1978); Philadelphia Eagles (1978-1979)

Career NFL statistics
- Rushing attempts: 53
- Rushing yards: 156
- Receptions: 4
- Receiving yards: 29
- Total TDs: 2
- Stats at Pro Football Reference

Lawrence Barnes (born July 17, 1954) is an American former professional football player who was a running back for three seasons in the National Football League (NFL) with the San Diego Chargers, St Louis Cardinals and Philadelphia Eagles. He played college football for the Tennessee State Tigers.

== Early life ==
Larry Barnes was born on July 17, 1954, in Bessemer, Alabama. He went to high school at Jess Lanier (AL).

== Professional career ==
=== San Diego Chargers ===
Barnes was selected in the sixth round (151st overall) of the 1977 NFL draft by the San Diego Chargers. That year, he played in five total games and made 24 rushes for 70 yards. In 1978, he played in 4 games, before joining the St. Louis Cardinals.

=== St Louis Cardinals ===
The Cardinals cut running back Willie Shelby in order to make room to sign Barnes. He appeared in two games with the Cardinals before signing with the Philadelphia Eagles.

=== Philadelphia Eagles ===
With his third-team of the 1978 season, the Philadelphia Eagles, Barnes played in seven games, making just one rush attempt. His one attempt scored a touchdown. In 1979, he had his best season statistically, recording 25 rushes for 74 yards and a touchdown. He did not play in any other games following the 1979 season.
