= Tony Davis (running back) =

American football player (1953–2026)

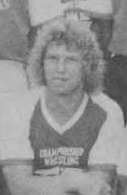
- Davis, c. 1982

No. 35, 25, 27
- Position: Running back

Personal information
- Born: January 21, 1953; Tecumseh, Nebraska, U.S.
- Died: April 5, 2026 (aged 73)
- Listed height: 5 ft 11 in (1.80 m)
- Listed weight: 212 lb (96 kg)

Career information
- High school: Tecumseh
- College: Nebraska
- NFL draft: 1976: 4th round, 106th overall pick

Career history
- Cincinnati Bengals (1976–1978); Tampa Bay Buccaneers (1979–1981); Boston Breakers (1983)

Awards and highlights
- Second-team All-Big Eight (1975); Nebraska Sports Hall of Fame, 1989; Cotton Bowl Hall of Fame, 2025

Career NFL statistics
- Rushing att-yards: 91-345
- Receptions-yards: 27-250
- Total TDs: 6
- Stats at Pro Football Reference

Michael Eugene "Tony" Davis (January 21, 1953 – April 5, 2026) was an American professional football player who was a running back in the National Football League (NFL). Davis played college football for the Nebraska Cornhuskers as both an I-back and fullback under then-new head coach Tom Osborne.

== Biography ==
From Tecumseh, Nebraska, southeast of Lincoln, Davis was Osborne's first 1,000-yard rusher (as a sophomore in 1973) and left as the Cornhuskers' all-time leading rusher. He was the most valuable player in two of college football's major bowl games in the same calendar year (1974); the Cotton Bowl win over the Texas Longhorns (19–3) on New Year's Day as a sophomore, and Sugar Bowl win on New Year's Eve over the Florida Gators (13–10). He was elected to the Nebraska Sports Hall of Fame in 1989.

In the 1976 NFL draft, Davis was selected in the fourth round (106th overall) by the Cincinnati Bengals. He played six seasons in the NFL, three each for the Bengals (1976–1978) and Tampa Bay Buccaneers (1979–1981). In his second year in 1977, Davis was the Bengals' team MVP, selected by a vote of players and fans. He also played one season (1983) for the Boston Breakers of the USFL.

After his retirement as a player, Davis worked as a football assistant at Nebraska, coached high school football in Colorado, and worked in business development in the oil & gas industry. He was later an advocate who worked in communication with Congress to address issues prevalent to retired NFL players.

Davis died from complications of Parkinson's disease on April 5, 2026, at the age of 73.
