= Pat McInally =

American football player (born 1953)

No. 87
- Positions: Punter, wide receiver

Personal information
- Born: May 7, 1953 (age 73); Villa Park, California, U.S.
- Listed height: 6 ft 6 in (1.98 m)
- Listed weight: 210 lb (95 kg)

Career information
- High school: Villa Park
- College: Harvard (1971–1974)
- NFL draft: 1975: 5th round, 120th overall pick

Career history
- Cincinnati Bengals (1975−1985)

Awards and highlights
- First-team All-Pro (1981); Pro Bowl (1981); Cincinnati Bengals 50th Anniversary Team; First-team All-American (1974); Second-team All-American (1973); First-team All-East (1974); 2× First-team All-Ivy League (1973, 1974)

Career NFL statistics
- Receptions: 57
- Receiving yards: 808
- Receiving touchdowns: 5
- Punts: 700
- Punting yards: 29,307
- Punting average: 41.9
- Stats at Pro Football Reference
- College Football Hall of Fame

John Patrick McInally (born May 7, 1953) is an American former professional football player who was a punter and wide receiver for the Cincinnati Bengals of the National Football League (NFL).

McInally was enshrined in the College Football Hall of Fame in 2016. McInally was a two-time football All Ivy League first team selection and helped lead Harvard to a share of the 1974 Ivy League title. McInally is the first graduate of Harvard to play in either the NFL Pro Bowl or the Super Bowl. He did both during the 1981 season.

== Early life ==
McInally was born in Villa Park in Orange County, California, and graduated from Villa Park High School in 1971.

== College career ==
McInally was a wide receiver and punter for the Harvard Crimson football squad from 1972 to 1974. As a junior in 1973, he was second in the nation in receiving, setting a Harvard record of 56 receptions in a single season.

McInally concluded his career as the 1974 New England Player of the Year, also known as the George H. "Bulger" Lowe Award winner, an annual award by the Gridiron Club of Boston. McInally held the Crimson single-game, single-season and career records for touchdowns and receptions at the end of his career. He was also the leader in career receiving yards.

McInally was also the starting punter.

McInally, a cum laude graduate, was named a NFF National Scholar - Athlete and a first team All-American as a senior in 1974.

As a senior in 1974, he completed his only collegiate pass, a 46-yard pass to Jim Curry, another all-time great Harvard receiver, off a lateral against rival Yale University. The completion set up the go-ahead touchdown in The Game for Harvard. Harvard, with the 21–16 win and a 6–1 record, shared the title with Yale.

== Professional career ==
=== Perfect Wonderlic score ===
McInally scored the only verified perfect score among NFL players on the Wonderlic Test, an intelligence test developed in the 1930s and given to prospective players by the NFL to judge their aptitude for adapting to certain situations.

According to McInally, "It really did seem like an easy test at the time. One of the reasons I did so well is because I didn't think it mattered. So I think I didn't feel any pressure at all. It was more of a lark, and that's when you do your best. If I took it 100 times I'd probably never do that again." McInally claims it hurt, rather than enhanced, his position in the draft because "coaches and front-office guys don't like extremes one way or the other, but particularly not on the high side. I think they think guys who are intelligent will challenge authority too much." He took the test again in 2007 when Wonderlic hired him to manage its marketing of the exam. When told he missed one correct answer, McInally quipped, "Missed one. Not a bad score after six concussions."

=== Cincinnati Bengals ===
McInally was selected in the fifth round of the 1975 NFL draft. He suffered a broken leg while scoring a touchdown in the College All-Star Game against the Pittsburgh Steelers in early August, and missed the entire 1975 season.

He was the Bengals punter from 1976 to 1985, and also was a wide receiver during the first half of his career. He led the league in net yards per punt in 1977 (36.4) and in punting average in 1978 (43.1) and 1981 (45.4). His most productive years receiving were in 1977, when he caught 17 passes for 258 yards (a 15.2 average) and three touchdowns, and in 1980, when he caught 18 passes for 269 yards (a 14.9 average) and two touchdowns. He also completed three passes in four career attempts for 81 yards.

In 1980 Bengals' season finale, which was a Bengals–Browns rivalry game, Thom Darden used a forearm tackle to the face of McInally. McInally was unconscious for about 10 minutes and left the field on a stretcher, but he returned in the second half to make three receptions for 86 yards, including a game-tying touchdown. The hit and McInally's recovery are a legendary part of the intrastate rivalry.

Because McInally did start off his career as a wide receiver, he was allowed to keep number 87 after becoming a full-time punter despite the number being outlawed outside of receivers and tight ends in 1973 and (having come into the league after that point) not being covered under a grandfather clause. (Even after the NFL significantly relaxed jersey numbering rules in 2021, punters still cannot wear any number higher than 49.) This was not unlike McInally's contemporary, New York Giants linebacker Brad Van Pelt, who despite also not being covered under a grandfather clause was allowed to keep number 10 (a number now allowed again by linebackers) as he served as the Giants backup kicker.

== NFL career statistics ==
Legend
	Led the league
**Bold**	Career high

=== Regular season ===
Year	Team	Punting									
Year	Team	GP	Punts	Yds	Net Yds	Lng	Avg	Net Avg	Blk	Ins20	TB
1976	CIN	14	76	2,999	2,556	61	39.5	33.6	0	12	6
1977	CIN	14	67	2,802	2,475	**67**	41.8	**36.4**	1	16	3
1978	CIN	**16**	**91**	**3,919**	**3,161**	65	43.1	34.7	0	**25**	10
1979	CIN	**16**	89	3,678	3,113	61	41.3	34.2	**2**	19	**12**
1980	CIN	**16**	83	3,390	2,674	61	40.8	31.5	**2**	21	**12**
1981	CIN	**16**	72	3,272	2,636	62	**45.4**	36.1	1	17	11
1982	CIN	9	31	1,201	1,053	53	38.7	34.0	0	7	4
1983	CIN	**16**	67	2,804	2,314	60	41.9	33.5	**2**	13	9
1984	CIN	**16**	67	2,832	2,362	61	42.3	35.3	0	19	8
1985	CIN	**16**	57	2,410	1,735	64	42.3	29.9	1	8	7
Career		149	700	29,307	24,079	67	41.9	34.0	9	157	82

=== Playoffs ===
Year	Team	Punting									
Year	Team	GP	Punts	Yds	Net Yds	Lng	Avg	Net Avg	Blk	Ins20	TB
1981	CIN	**3**	**10**	**401**	**360**	**60**	40.1	36.0	0	**2**	**1**
1982	CIN	1	2	86	84	45	**43.0**	**42.0**	0	0	0
Career		4	12	487	444	60	40.6	37.0	0	2	1

== Life after football ==
McInally married Leslie Bevis (not the actor) in 1984. They have two children.

McInally conceived the Starting Lineup series of action figures circa 1985, the final year of his career, and pitched the idea to Kenner, a leading producer of toys. Kenner agreed to develop it and the line became a top seller. Kenner was later sold to Hasbro. McInally himself was not included in the Starting Lineup line until a 10th-anniversary figure of him was released in 1997.

"SLUs," as collectors call the figures, were discontinued after the 2001 Major League Baseball season. The action figures generated $700 million in sales. McInally received royalties in retirement.

In 1986, McInally worked as a color commentator on college football games for one season on ESPN with play-by-play announcer Mike Patrick. He was replaced on the broadcasts by Lee Corso.

McInally founded Good Sports For Life, an organization that, according to McInally, "is dedicated to working with partners to improve youth sports by promoting meaningful participation, improved performance, personal growth, and creating positive experiences for the 37 million kids playing sports today." He writes regular columns on behalf of the organization that appear on NFL.com. For years he wrote a newspaper column nationally syndicated by King Features, "Pat Answers for Kids." The column, which first ran in the Cincinnati Enquirer, eventually appeared in newspapers nationwide including the Chicago Tribune and the Boston Globe.

In 2006, the Wonderlic Company named McInally its director of marketing and testing to help student athletes prepare for the SAT.

McInally coached high school football at Brethren Christian High School in Huntington Beach, California, and from 2014 to 2016 his teams posted the highest winning percentage in Orange County, California.

McInally founded the College Sports Connections Foundation, a non-profit organization dedicated to helping student-athletes from economically challenged families. The foundation assisted these scholar-athletes with test preparation (ACT/SAT), mentorship, and consulting in the college search process.

McInally is also a children's book collector. In 2009, he was reported to have sold at auction for $115,000 a rare edition of Alice's Adventures in Wonderland by Lewis Carroll, which had been given to the real Alice, Alice Liddell.
