= Jerry Anderson (safety) =

American football player (1953–1989)

Profile
- Position: Safety

Personal information
- Born: October 27, 1953; Murfreesboro, Tennessee, U.S.
- Died: May 27, 1989 (aged 35); Murfreesboro, Tennessee, U.S.
- Listed height: 5 ft 11 in (1.80 m)
- Listed weight: 200 lb (91 kg)

Career information
- College: Oklahoma
- NFL draft: 1977: 4th round, 105th overall pick

Career history
- 1977: Cincinnati Bengals (NFL)
- 1978: Tampa Bay Buccaneers (NFL)
- 1980–1981: Hamilton Tiger-Cats (CFL)

Awards and highlights
- National champion (1975); Second-team All-Big Eight (1975)
- Stats at Pro Football Reference

Jerry O. Anderson (October 27, 1953 – May 27, 1989) was an American football safety. He played one season for the Cincinnati Bengals and one season for the Tampa Bay Buccaneers in the National Football League (NFL). He played in 14 games in 1977 with Cincinnati and two games in 1978 with Tampa Bay, but never recorded an interception. He then played for the Hamilton Tiger-Cats of the Canadian Football League (CFL) in 1980 and 1981.

Following his career, he was viewed as a hero by his family and community. On May 27, 1984, he rescued some trapped motorists from floodwaters in Tulsa, Oklahoma. Even though Anderson pulled two people from Dirty Butter Creek, he felt guilty that he was unable to save a third person, Bridgette Johnson, from a submerged car that day. Exactly five years later, on May 27, 1989, in his hometown of Murfreesboro, Tennessee, Anderson took Dwight Ogleton Jr. and another boy fishing on the Stones River, which had been bloated by heavy rains. Brad Logsdon and Josh McFarland were fishing on a nearby dam when they were overtaken by the water. McFarland fell in. Logsdon extended a hand to grab McFarland and he then fell in too. Anderson managed to rescue both boys but went underwater two or three times and never resurfaced. He died five months shy of his 36th birthday and was buried June 3, 1989, at Green Acres Cemetery north of Tulsa. Rescue workers pulled him from the river and took him to Middle Tennessee Medical Center, where he was pronounced dead. On October 31, 1989, the story of his heroism and death was aired on Rescue 911 on CBS.

About six months after Anderson's death, the local NAACP chapter named an award in his honor. The Jerry Anderson Hero and Humanitarian Awards are awarded each January to someone in the community.

The Murfreesboro City Council voted May 15 (2014) to rename Community Circle in the Kimbro Woods subdivision Jerry Anderson Drive.

Anderson received, posthumously, the Robert P. Connelly Medal for Heroism.
