= Willie Shelby =

American football player (born 1953)

No. 30
- Positions: Running back, kick returner

Personal information
- Born: July 24, 1953 (age 73); Hattiesburg, Mississippi, U.S.
- Listed height: 5 ft 11 in (1.80 m)
- Listed weight: 195 lb (88 kg)

Career information
- High school: Purvis (Purvis, Mississippi)
- College: Alabama
- NFL draft: 1976: 5th round, 138th overall pick

Career history
- Cincinnati Bengals (1976–1977); St. Louis Cardinals (1978)

Awards and highlights
- NFL kickoff return yards leader (1976); National champion (1973); First-team All-SEC (1974); Second-team All-SEC (1973)

Career NFL statistics
- Rushing attempts: 7
- Rushing yards: 14
- Total TDs: 2
- Stats at Pro Football Reference

Willie Earl Shelby (born July 24, 1953) is an American former professional football player who was a running back and kick returner for the Cincinnati Bengals and the St. Louis Cardinals of the National Football League (NFL). As an NFL rookie in 1976, he led the league in several kick return categories. He played college football for the Alabama Crimson Tide.

== College career ==
Shelby played college football for the Alabama Crimson Tide in 1973, 1974 and 1975. He served primarily as a kick returner in 1973, but became the starting halfback as a junior in 1974. He ran 84 times in 19974 for 541 yards, a 6.4 average. One of his best games came on October 5 against the University of Mississippi, when he scored 2 touchdowns, including on a 58-yard run. The game was particularly sweet to Shelby, as he had been called a "traitor" for attending Alabama instead of his home state school of Mississippi and had received a racist letter before the game.

As a senior in 1975 he dropped to 315 yards as fullback Johnny Davis became Alabama's primary ball carrier. Shelby was disappointed with his senior season. He had also set a goal when he entered college "to be remembered as the best ever" but realized that hadn't happened, although he felt he would be able to become a good professional running back.

== Professional career ==
Shelby was selected by the Bengals with the 138th overall pick of the fifth round of the 1976 NFL draft. He got little work as a running back in 1976, rushing just 5 times all season for 9 yards. But he served as the Bengals' primary kick returner. He returned 30 kickoffs for 761 yards, for a 25.4 yard per return average. He also scored a touchdown on a 97-yard kickoff return against the Cleveland Browns on October 3. His 761 kickoff return yards led the NFL that season, and his 97-yard return was the longest in the NFL that season. His one touchdown tied with Cullen Bryant of the Los Angeles Rams for the NFL lead. His 30 kickoff returns tied for 2nd in the NFL, one behind league leader Lou Piccone, and his 25.4 yards per return average tied for 9th. Shelby also returned 21 punts for 162 yards, a 7.7 yard per return average.

Shelby was less successful as a kick returner in 1977 and the Bengals waived him before the 1978 season. He was signed by the Atlanta Falcons, but the Falcons returned him to the Bengals when a physical exam showed that he had suffered a broken collar bone in the Bengals' final preseason game against the Green Bay Packers. The Bengals waived him again a few days later and he was claimed by the St. Louis Cardinals. He played 3 of 7 games for the Cardinals as a running back and kick returner in 1978 before being waived in October in order to make room on the roster to sign running back Lawrence Barnes.

He ended his pro career with 7 rushing attempts for 14 yards, 2 receptions for 14 yards, 58 kickoff returns for 1375 yards (a 23.7 yard average) and 42 punt returns for 302 yards (a 7.2 yard average).
