= Deacon Turner =

American football player (1955–2011)

No. 22
- Position: Running back

Personal information
- Born: January 2, 1955; Jackson, Mississippi, U.S.
- Died: July 10, 2011 (aged 56); Bakersfield, California, U.S.
- Listed height: 5 ft 11 in (1.80 m)
- Listed weight: 212 lb (96 kg)

Career information
- High school: Shafter (Shafter, California)
- College: San Diego State
- NFL draft: 1978: 2nd round, 45th overall pick

Career history
- Cincinnati Bengals (1978–1980)

Career NFL statistics
- Rushing yards: 549
- Rushing average: 3.9
- Rushing touchdowns: 1
- Stats at Pro Football Reference

David Lee "Deacon" Turner (January 2, 1955 – July 10, 2011) was an American professional football running back in the National Football League (NFL). He attended San Diego State University. He played with the Cincinnati Bengals from 1978 to 1980.

On July 10, 2011, Turner was fatally shot during an altercation with Kern County Sheriff deputies in Bakersfield, California in which he allegedly swung a bag of unopened beer at a deputy. Witnesses at the scene alleged that one deputy struck him from behind with a baton as he attempted to walk away. His son, with him at the time, says that deputies fired when Turner fell and the beer can that he was carrying exploded after hitting the ground. He was 56 years old.
