= Billy Brooks =

American football player (born 1953)

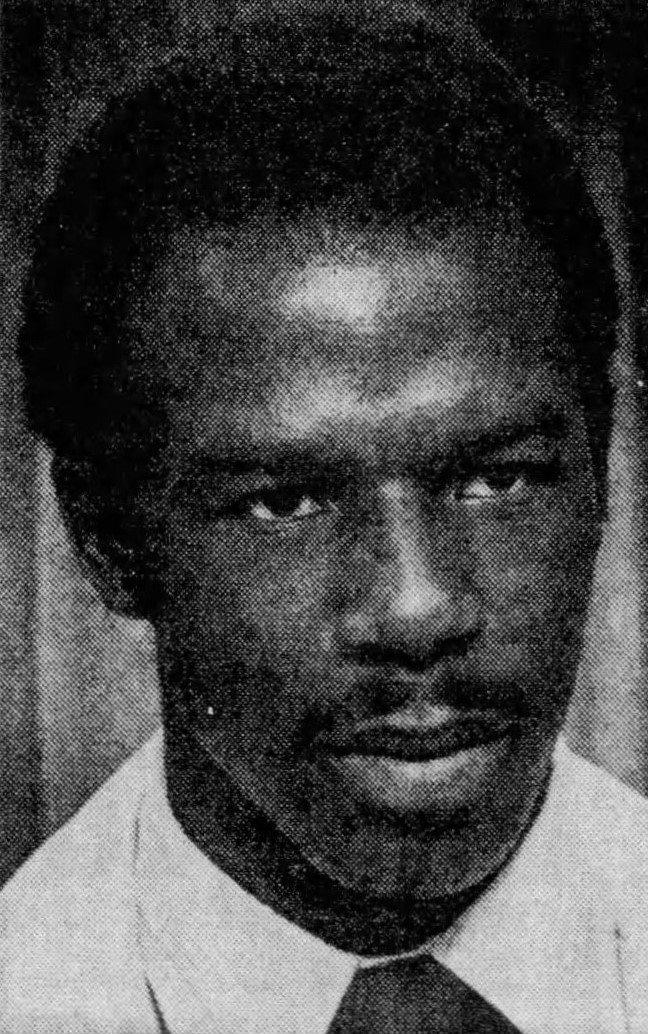
- Billy Brooks in 1976

No. 82, 88
- Position: Wide receiver

Personal information
- Born: July 22, 1953 (age 73); Austin, Texas, U.S.
- Listed height: 6 ft 3 in (1.91 m)
- Listed weight: 204 lb (93 kg)

Career information
- High school: Austin (TX) Johnston
- College: Oklahoma
- NFL draft: 1976: 1st round, 11th overall pick

Career history
- Cincinnati Bengals (1976–1979); San Diego Chargers (1981); Houston Oilers (1981)

Awards and highlights
- 2× National champion (1974, 1975)

Career NFL statistics
- Receptions: 96
- Receiving yards: 1,720
- Touchdowns: 7
- Stats at Pro Football Reference

William McKinley Brooks III (born July 22, 1953) is an American former professional football player who was a wide receiver in the National Football League (NFL). He attended attended the University of Oklahoma, graduating with a degree in special education. While there, he played college football for the Oklahoma Sooners. He was selected by the Cincinnati Bengals in the first round with the 11th overall pick in the 1976 NFL draft. Brooks also played for the San Diego Chargers and Houston Oilers.

== NFL career statistics ==
Legend
**Bold**	Career high

Year	Team	Games		Receiving				
Year	Team	GP	GS	Rec	Yds	Avg	Lng	TD
1976	CIN	12	9	16	191	11.9	25	0
1977	CIN	14	9	**39**	**772**	19.8	**94**	**4**
1978	CIN	**15**	**13**	30	506	16.9	45	2
1979	CIN	4	4	8	214	**26.8**	73	1
1981	HOU	3	0	2	16	8.0	16	0
1981	SDG	7	0	1	21	21.0	21	0
		55	35	96	1,720	17.9	94	7

== Personal life ==
Brooks has two sons, both actors Mehcad Brooks, Billy Brooks Jr., with Austin American-Statesman editorial writer Alberta Phillips.
