= Ron Shumon =

American football player (born 1955)

No. 59, 50
- Position: Linebacker

Personal information
- Born: December 11, 1955 (age 70); Flint, Michigan, U.S.
- Listed height: 6 ft 1 in (1.85 m)
- Listed weight: 230 lb (104 kg)

Career information
- High school: Haverford (Havertown, Pennsylvania)
- College: Wichita State
- NFL draft: 1978: 9th round, 238th overall pick

Career history
- Cincinnati Bengals (1978); San Francisco 49ers (1979)
- Stats at Pro Football Reference

Ronald Shumon (born December 11, 1955) is an American former professional football linebacker who played for the Cincinnati Bengals and San Francisco 49ers of the National Football League (NFL). He played college football at Wichita State University.
