= Tom Dinkel =

American football player (born 1956)

No. 52, 51
- Position: Linebacker

Personal information
- Born: July 25, 1956 (age 70); Topeka, Kansas, U.S.
- Listed height: 6 ft 4 in (1.93 m)
- Listed weight: 240 lb (109 kg)

Career information
- High school: Shawnee Heights (Tecumseh, Kansas)
- College: Kansas
- NFL draft: 1978: 5th round, 126th overall pick

Career history
- Cincinnati Bengals (1978–1985)

Awards and highlights
- Second-team All-Big Eight (1977)

Career NFL statistics
- Sacks: 4.5
- Fumble recoveries: 8
- Interceptions: 1
- Stats at Pro Football Reference

Thomas Dinkel (born July 25, 1956) is an American former professional football player who was a linebacker in the National Football League (NFL). He played college football for the Kansas Jayhawks.

== Football career ==
He played college football at the University of Kansas. He was selected by the Cincinnati Bengals in the 5th round (126th overall pick) of the 1978 NFL draft. He played seven seasons for the Cincinnati Bengals.
