= Don Bass (American football) =

American football player (1956–1989)

No. 84, 88
- Positions: Wide receiver, tight end

Personal information
- Born: March 11, 1956; Fort Worth, Texas, U.S.
- Died: October 26, 1989 (aged 33); Waxahachie, Texas, U.S.
- Listed height: 6 ft 2 in (1.88 m)
- Listed weight: 219 lb (99 kg)

Career information
- College: Houston
- NFL draft: 1978: 3rd round, 83rd overall pick

Career history
- Cincinnati Bengals (1978–1981); New Orleans Saints (1982)

Awards and highlights
- First-team All-SWC (1977)

Career NFL statistics
- Receptions: 117
- Receiving yards: 1,580
- Receiving touchdowns: 13
- Stats at Pro Football Reference

Donald Wayne Bass (March 11, 1956 – October 26, 1989) was an American professional football tight end in the National Football League (NFL). He played five seasons for the Cincinnati Bengals from 1978 to 1981 and the New Orleans Saints in 1982. He played college football at the University of Houston. He has two living children. In his four seasons at Houston, Bass caught 105 passes for 1,821 yards and 16 touchdowns. Bass was selected by the Bengals in the third round of the 1978 NFL draft.

Bass went on to catch 117 passes for 1,580 yards and 13 touchdowns over his first three seasons. He did not have any regular season receptions in his last two years, though he did catch a touchdown pass in the Bengals 1981 win over the San Diego Chargers in the AFC championship game. He also recovered a fumbled kickoff return in that game.

In October 1989, Bass was shot and killed by Darrell Billingslea, after Bass allegedly told police to search Billingslea's motel room for drugs. Billingslea was convicted of killing Bass in 1990 while serving a 25-year prison sentence for another murder. He was paroled in 2007 and was convicted of a third murder in 2009, resulting in a 50-year prison sentence on top of the 11 years left for the original killings.
