= Carl Allen (cornerback) =

American football player (1955–2021)

No. 27
- Position: Cornerback

Personal information
- Born: December 21, 1955; Hattiesburg, Mississippi, U.S.
- Died: March 31, 2021 (aged 65); St. Louis, Missouri, U.S.
- Listed height: 6 ft 0 in (1.83 m)
- Listed weight: 185 lb (84 kg)

Career information
- High school: Rowan (MS); Blair (MS)
- College: Southern Miss
- NFL draft: 1977: 11th round, 299th overall pick

Career history
- St. Louis Cardinals (1977–1982); Pittsburgh Gladiators (1989)

Career NFL statistics
- Games played: 79
- Interceptions: 16
- Interception yards: 306
- Touchdowns: 1
- Stats at Pro Football Reference

Career AFL statistics
- Tackles: 14
- Pass deflections: 2
- Fumble recoveries: 2
- Stats at ArenaFan.com

Joseph Carl Allen (December 21, 1955 – March 31, 2021) was a cornerback in the National Football League (NFL). He was selected by the Cincinnati Bengals in the 11th round of the 1977 NFL draft but played his entire career with the St. Louis Cardinals. He played college football at Southern Miss.

== NFL career ==
After being selected by the Bengals, Allen was traded to the Cardinals for a future draft pick on August 30, 1977.

He had his only career touchdown on a 70-yard interception return in a September 28, 1980, game against the Philadelphia Eagles.

Allen was placed on injured reserve on November 18, 1981, due to a knee injury against the Buffalo Bills.

== Retirement ==
Allen retired in St. Louis where he taught and coached in the Jennings School District. He served as quarterback and defensive back coach and was part of five district championships and the first non-conference championship in 2006. He retired from coaching in 2012 and retired from teaching in 2020.

Carl Allen died March 31, 2021, at the age of 65.
