= Isaac Curtis =

American football player (born 1950)

No. 85
- Position: Wide receiver

Personal information
- Born: October 20, 1950 (age 76); Santa Ana, California, U.S.
- Listed height: 6 ft 1 in (1.85 m)
- Listed weight: 192 lb (87 kg)

Career information
- High school: Santa Ana
- College: California (1970–1971); San Diego State (1972)
- NFL draft: 1973: 1st round, 15th overall pick

Career history
- Cincinnati Bengals (1973–1984)

Awards and highlights
- 3× Second-team All-Pro (1974–1976); 4× Pro Bowl (1973–1976); Cincinnati Bengals Ring of Honor; Cincinnati Bengals 50th Anniversary Team

Career NFL statistics
- Receptions: 416
- Receiving yards: 7,101
- Receiving touchdowns: 53
- Stats at Pro Football Reference

Isaac Fisher Curtis (born October 20, 1950) is an American former professional football player who was a wide receiver in the National Football League (NFL) and spent his entire career with the Cincinnati Bengals (1973–1984). He played college football for the California Golden Bears and San Diego State Aztecs.

== Early life ==
Isaac Curtis was a star running back as well as a hurdler that set a conference record lasting years at Santa Ana High School in California. In 1985 his former coach called him "the best running back to ever play in Orange County.

== College career ==
Curtis received a football scholarship to the University of California, Berkeley. For three years, he excelled as a member of Cal's track team, and he was a running back and kick returner for their football team.

Curtis contributed 18 points to Cal's team title at the 1970 NCAA University Division Outdoor Track and Field Championships. However, in January 1971 his points were revoked by the NCAA as Cal had failed to predict that Curtis' GPA would be below 1.6, causing them to retroactively lose the title. The decision was considered controversial as it was the first time the "1.6" rule was used to revoke a team title.

After he finished his junior season, Curtis transferred to San Diego State University because of the controversy surrounding the probation of Cal's football team. He excelled as a slot wide receiver during his senior season with the Aztecs under famed coach Don Coryell, who moved him from running back to receiver. That year, Curtis caught 44 passes for 832 yards and seven touchdowns.

== NFL draft ==
Entering the 1973 NFL draft, the Cincinnati Bengals needed a wide receiver who had the speed to spread the field and opposing defenses for quarterback Ken Anderson. Curtis had world-class speed, running the 100-yard dash in 9.3 seconds as a member of Cal's track team. Curtis also recorded a time of 20.7 seconds in the 200-meter dash in Los Angeles in 1970.

Although Curtis had played only one year as wide receiver, Bengals coach and general manager Paul Brown decided to take a chance on him and drafted Curtis in the first round (15th overall). Later in his career, Paul Brown said that what he liked the most about Isaac Curtis was not so much his athleticism but his always quietly confident personality, saying "He's a very gentle person...no jumping up and down, spiking it, or trash talking".

== Professional career ==
Isaac Curtis made the starting lineup as a rookie and had a superb season, recording 45 receptions for 843 yards, an average of 18.7 yards per catch, and nine touchdowns.

In Curtis' second season, he caught 30 passes for 630 yards (a 21.1 yard-per-catch average) and a career-best 10 touchdowns.

Curtis' most productive season was in 1975, when he caught 44 passes for 934 yards for a league-leading and career-best 21.2 yard-per-catch average, along with scoring seven touchdowns.

He had another big year in 1976, with 41 receptions for 766 yards and six touchdowns, including a career-long 85-yard touchdown reception.

In 1977, Curtis was limited by injury to 20 catches in eight games, but bounced back in 1978 with a career-best 47 receptions along with 737 yards and three touchdowns.

He continued to play a major part in the Bengals' passing games until his 11th and final NFL season, 1984, when he had 12 receptions.

Curtis was a Pro Bowl selection four times (1973–1976) and was selected second-team All-Pro for three consecutive seasons (1974–1976). Curtis helped lead the Bengals to a Super Bowl appearance in the 1981 season and had a solid performance in Super Bowl XVI, catching three passes for 42 yards. Years after his retirement, his quarterback Ken Anderson said that Isaac Curtis was "The Jerry Rice before Jerry Rice."

In his 12 NFL seasons, Curtis totaled 416 receptions for 7,101 yards and 53 touchdowns, while also gaining 76 rushing yards on 25 carries.

His 17.1 yards per catch average is a Bengals record and his 7,101 receiving yards was a franchise record until broken by Chad Johnson on September 16, 2007. His 53 touchdown receptions were a Bengals record until surpassed by Carl Pickens during the 1990s. In 2022, Curtis was inducted into the Cincinnati Bengals Ring of Honor.

== The Isaac Curtis rule ==
"The Isaac Curtis rule" should not be confused with the "Mel Blount rule", which was a stricter revision of "The Isaac Curtis Rule". Because Isaac Curtis had world-class speed there were no defensive backs who could keep up with him; all of the teams would double and sometimes even triple cover him. In 1973 in his first year, the Bengals won the Central Division and faced the eventual Super Bowl Champions, the Miami Dolphins. Don Shula's defensive backs did not have the speed to cover Curtis and Shula decided that he would have them push, bump, and hold him down the field. After that game, NFL defenses, including the Steelers started doing the same thing to stop Curtis. Paul Brown wanted the rule changed telling the NFL Competition Committee, "What good is it for us to have performers, if they aren't allowed to perform."

"The Isaac Curtis Rule" states that a defender is allowed to block a receiver within five yards of the line of scrimmage. After the initial yards any contact will be considered holding, which is a five-yard penalty and an automatic first down.

"He changed the game," said former Bengals teammate and wide receiver Cris Collinsworth. "There's no question because no one could keep up with him. They put in the five-yard bump rules and all that crazy stuff that it all eventually became".

== NFL career statistics ==
Legend
	Led the league
**Bold**	Career high

=== Regular season ===
Year	Team	Games		Receiving				
Year	Team	GP	GS	Rec	Yds	Avg	Lng	TD
1973	CIN	14	14	45	843	18.7	77	9
1974	CIN	14	14	30	633	21.1	77	**10**
1975	CIN	14	14	44	**934**	**21.2**	55	7
1976	CIN	14	14	41	766	18.7	**85**	6
1977	CIN	8	8	20	338	16.9	54	2
1978	CIN	**16**	**16**	**47**	737	15.7	57	3
1979	CIN	**16**	14	32	605	18.9	67	8
1980	CIN	15	14	43	610	14.2	67	3
1981	CIN	15	14	37	609	16.5	68	2
1982	CIN	9	9	23	320	13.9	45	1
1983	CIN	**16**	**16**	42	571	13.6	80	2
1984	CIN	**16**	13	12	135	11.3	22	0
		167	160	416	7,101	17.1	85	53

=== Playoffs ===
Year	Team	Games		Receiving				
Year	Team	GP	GS	Rec	Yds	Avg	Lng	TD
1973	CIN	1	1	1	9	9.0	9	0
1975	CIN	1	1	3	20	6.7	14	**1**
1981	CIN	**3**	**3**	**6**	**92**	15.3	22	0
1982	CIN	1	1	3	63	**21.0**	**32**	**1**
		6	6	13	184	14.2	32	2

== After football ==
Curtis is a sales executive for Winegardner and Hammons, Inc., a hotel management company in the Cincinnati suburb of Blue Ash. He has lived in the North Avondale section of Cincinnati for over 20 years.
