= Tom DePaso =

American football player (born 1956)

No. 52, 56
- Position: Linebacker

Personal information
- Born: February 22, 1956 (age 70); White Plains, New York, U.S.
- Listed height: 6 ft 2 in (1.88 m)
- Listed weight: 222 lb (101 kg)

Career information
- High school: White Plains
- College: Penn State
- NFL draft: 1978: 10th round, 267th overall pick

Career history
- Cincinnati Bengals (1978)
- Stats at Pro Football Reference

Thomas James DePaso (born February 22, 1956) is an American former professional football player who was a linebacker for the Cincinnati Bengals of the National Football League (NFL). He played college football for the Penn State Nittany Lions.
