= Dennis Law (American football) =

American football player (born 1955)

No. 83
- Positions: Wide receiver, return specialist

Personal information
- Born: April 4, 1955 (age 71); Commerce, Georgia, U.S.
- Listed height: 6 ft 1 in (1.85 m)
- Listed weight: 179 lb (81 kg)

Career information
- High school: Jefferson (Jefferson, Georgia)
- College: East Tennessee State
- NFL draft: 1978: 4th round, 99th overall pick

Career history
- Cincinnati Bengals (1978–1979); Washington Redskins (1979)*; Tampa Bay Buccaneers (1980)*
- * Offseason or practice squad member only

Career NFL statistics
- Receptions: 5
- Receiving yards: 81
- Return yards: 136
- Stats at Pro Football Reference

Raymond Dennis Law (born April 4, 1955) is an American former professional football player who was a wide receiver and return specialist in the 1978 season for the Cincinnati Bengals of the National Football League (NFL). Law played college football for the East Tennessee State Buccaneers primarily as a wide receiver from 1973 to 1976, learning the return specialist position in 1977 and starting in the role. He was also a part of the practice squad for the Washington Redskins and the Tampa Bay Buccaneers.

Law declared for the 1978 NFL draft after his redshirt senior season. He was selected with the fifteenth pick of the fourth round (99th overall) by the Bengals after a commendable 1977 season, leading team stats as a wide receiver and earning All-Ohio Valley honours. Primarily used as a return specialist for the Bengals, Law recorded 5 receptions throughout the 1978 season. He is primarily known for breaking an "unwritten commandment" while returning a punt against the Buffalo Bills in Week 8, getting tackled in the endzone. Following the 1978 season, he was dropped by the Bengals and was signed to various NFL practice squads.

== Early life ==
Law attended Jefferson High School in Jefferson, Georgia. He competed in football as a wide receiver and in track and field. As a senior in 1972, he was ranked in the top 10 of all Class A wide receivers in the region, and was voted to the Georgia All-State Class A team.

Law enrolled at East Tennessee State University as an accounting major, receiving an athletic scholarship in 1973 to join the football team as a freshman. In 1974, Law had redshirted to extend his stay at East Tennessee. For his first two years with East Tennessee, he was a reserve for the wide receiver position but gained the starting role in 1975, where he caught 18 passes in 11 games for 428 yards and a touchdown. Law improved his performance in 1976 with 22 catches in 10 games for 460 yards and a touchdown. Coming into the 1977 season, Law took over the punt and kick-off return position when team injuries caused him to fill-in in a game against Murray State. Law became the team's best wide receiver, with 33 catches in 11 games for 488 yards and four touchdowns. Law made 18 returns for 510 yards and two touchdowns, landing him a spot on the All-Ohio Valley team with East Tennessee.

== Professional career ==
Law was selected by the Cincinnati Bengals in the fourth round with the 99th pick overall in the 1978 NFL draft.

Law made his NFL debut on September 3, 1978, against the Kansas City Chiefs. Law received 1 pass for 18 yards and returned 4 punts for 29 yards. Law was primarily used as a kick and punt returner for the 1978 season, returning 25 kicks and 2 punts for 136 yards, and receiving 5 passes for 81 yards as a wide receiver. Law is most known for a mistake he made against the Buffalo Bills on October 22, 1978, by breaking an "unwritten commandment" of running into the end zone to receive a punt rather than staying on the 10-yard line; he was tackled by Lou Piccone for a safety, making the game's score 5–0 Bills.

Law was traded on August 24, 1979, to the Washington Redskins for an undisclosed draft pick, but was put on the retired list two days later, declaring the trade void. Law was taken off the retired list and waived off by the Bengals and then signed by the Redskins on November 6, 1979, as a replacement for Buddy Hardeman who had suffered a broken jaw. Law was later waived the following week on the 13th to make room for the signing of Bobby Hammond.

On April 18, 1980, the Tampa Bay Buccaneers signed Law along with wide receivers Warren Anderson and Randy Simmrin. On August 6, 1980, the Buccaneers waived Law along with tight end Steve Stephens and defensive back Larry Flowers.
