= Greg Fairchild =

American football player (born 1954)

No. 63, 61
- Positions: Guard, tackle, center

Personal information
- Born: March 10, 1954 (age 72); St. Louis, Missouri, U.S.
- Listed height: 6 ft 4 in (1.93 m)
- Listed weight: 258 lb (117 kg)

Career information
- High school: St. Mary's (St. Louis)
- College: Tulsa
- NFL draft: 1976: 4th round, 116th overall pick

Career history
- Cincinnati Bengals (1976–1977); Cleveland Browns (1978); Toronto Argonauts (1978–1979); Michigan Panthers (1983); Memphis Showboats (1984)

Career NFL statistics
- Games played: 27
- Games started: 2
- Fumble recoveries: 1
- Stats at Pro Football Reference

Greg Fairchild (born March 10, 1954) is an American former professional football player who was a guard, tackle and center in the National Football League (NFL), Canadian Football League (CFL) and United States Football League (USFL). He played college football for the Tulsa Golden Hurricane. He played in the NFL for the Cincinnati Bengals from 1976 to 1977 and Cleveland Browns in 1978.
