= Bob Bateman =

American football quarterback (born 1954)

Profile
- Position: Quarterback

Personal information
- Born: February 15, 1954; Darien, CT
- Listed height: 6 ft 5 in (1.96 m)

Career information
- High school: Darien (CT)
- College: Vermont (1974); Brown (1975)
- NFL draft: 1976: 7th round, 187th overall pick

Career history
- Cincinnati Bengals (1976)*; Montreal Alouettes (1976); New England Patriots (1977)*
- * Offseason or practice squad member only

Awards and highlights
- UVM Hall of Fame

Robert Bateman (born February 15, 1954) was an American football player. He played quarterback for the Vermont Catamounts football team. He "had the dual distinct of being UVM's last quarterback and perhaps the school's best." He earned several awards "including All-Yankee Conference, All-ECAC, All-New England, and All-America." He transferred to Brown.

The Cincinnati Bengals selected him in seventh round of the 1976 NFL draft. He was a member of the Bengals, the New England Patriots, and the Montreal Alouettes of the Canadian Football League.

He allegedly once played for UTEP under a pseudonym.
