= Ron Hunt (American football) =

American football player (born 1955)

No. 72
- Position: Offensive tackle

Personal information
- Born: January 27, 1955 (age 71); Los Angeles, California, U.S.
- Listed height: 6 ft 6 in (1.98 m)
- Listed weight: 261 lb (118 kg)

Career information
- High school: South Gate (South Gate, California)
- College: Oregon
- NFL draft: 1976: 8th round, 232nd overall pick

Career history
- Cincinnati Bengals (1976–1978); Baltimore Colts (1981)*
- * Offseason or practice squad member only

Awards and highlights
- Second-team All-Pac-8 (1973)
- Stats at Pro Football Reference

Ronald Michele Hunt (born January 27, 1955) is an American former professional football offensive tackle who played for the Cincinnati Bengals of the National Football League (NFL). He played college football for the Oregon Ducks and was selected by the Bengals in the eighth round of the 1976 NFL draft.

== Early life ==
Ronald Michele Hunt was born on January 27, 1955, in Los Angeles, California. He attended South Gate High School in South Gate, California.

== College career ==
Smith enrolled at the University of Oregon to play college football for the Ducks. He was a four-year letterman from 1972 to 1975. He earned United Press International second-team All-Pacific-8 Conference honors in 1973.

== Professional career ==
Hunt was selected by the Cincinnati Bengals in the eighth round, with the 232nd overall pick, of the 1976 NFL draft. He signed with the team on May 24. He played in 12 games during the 1972 season as a reserve offensive tackle and also returned two kicks for 24 yards. Hunt played in 13 games, starting two, in 1973 and played special teams as well. He started the 1978 season opener against the Kansas City Chiefs in place of the injured Vernon Holland. Hunt said he played against second-overall pick Art Still during the Chiefs game and Still did not touch the quarterback the entire game. On September 28, 1978, Hunt told the Associated Press "I have a lot of talent that's being wasted. It's like I'm an invisible man" because he had not played at all since the Chiefs game. He also said he wished the Bengals would trade him or waive him. Bengals head coach Bill Johnson said the team had not needed Hunt to play since and he was a backup tackle who was not "specialty team" material. Johnson said "We look for a guy who can run and tackle. Ideally, what you want are linebackers and defensive backs on these teams." Hunt appeared in two more games that year in a reserve role before being placed on injured reserve on October 25, 1978. On August 13, 1979, he was placed on the "reserve-did not report" list.

Hunt signed with the Baltimore Colts on April 21, 1981. On July 21, 1981, during Colts training camp, he quit football without informing the team.
