= Melvin Morgan =

American football player (born 1953)

No. 21, 46
- Position: Defensive back

Personal information
- Born: March 31, 1953 (age 73); Gulfport, Mississippi, U.S.
- Listed height: 6 ft 0 in (1.83 m)
- Listed weight: 183 lb (83 kg)

Career information
- High school: Harrison Central (MS)
- College: Mississippi Gulf Coast CC; Mississippi Valley State
- NFL draft: 1976: 11th round, 314th overall pick

Career history
- Cincinnati Bengals (1976–1978); San Francisco 49ers (1979–1980)

Career NFL statistics
- Interceptions: 3
- Fumble recoveries: 2
- Defensive TDs: 1
- Stats at Pro Football Reference

Melvin Morgan (born March 31, 1953) is an American former professional football player who was a defensive back in the National Football League (NFL). After playing college football for the Mississippi Valley State Delta Devils, Morgan was selected 314th overall by the Cincinnati Bengals in the 11th round of the 1976 NFL draft. He would play for the Bengals from 1976 to 1978, and the San Francisco 49ers from 1979 to 1980. Morgan injured his shoulder in 1980, ending his career.
