= Glenn Bujnoch =

American football player (1953–2023)

No. 74, 77
- Position: Guard

Personal information
- Born: December 20, 1953; Houston, Texas, U.S.
- Died: September 28, 2023 (aged 69); Cincinnati, Ohio, U.S.
- Listed height: 6 ft 5 in (1.96 m)
- Listed weight: 260 lb (118 kg)

Career information
- High school: Mount Carmel (TX)
- College: Texas A&M
- NFL draft: 1976: 2nd round, 38th overall pick

Career history
- Cincinnati Bengals (1976–1982); Tampa Bay Buccaneers (1983–1984)

Awards and highlights
- 2× Second-team All-SWC (1974, 1975)

Career NFL statistics
- Games played: 103
- Games started: 67
- Fumble recoveries: 1
- Stats at Pro Football Reference

Glenn David Bujnoch (/ˈbuːʒnɒk/ BOOZH-nok; December 20, 1953 – September 28, 2023) was an American professional football player who was a guard in the National Football League (NFL) from 1976 through 1984. He played college football for the Texas A&M Aggies.

== Early life ==
Bujnoch was born on December 20, 1953, and attended Mount Carmel High School in Houston, Texas. He then played college football at Texas A&M University.

== Professional career ==
Bujnoch was selected 38th overall in the second round of the 1976 NFL draft by the Cincinnati Bengals. In his rookie year with the Bengals, he played in all 14 games, starting one. In 1977, he became a starter, and from 1977 through 1980 (four seasons), he played in 60 games, starting all but four. On October 17, 1977, he scored his only NFL touchdown, on a four-yard run at Pittsburgh. In 1981, he was limited to six games (starting five), but it was a great year for the Bengals as Bujnoch was a member of the Bengals team that won the AFC Championship and played in Super Bowl XVI. Bujnoch played in nine games off the bench in 1982, his seventh and last with the Bengals.

Bujnoch signed with the Tampa Bay Buccaneers and played with them in 1983 and 1984, playing a total of 14 games, starting five. Bujnoch was cut by Tampa Bay before the 1985 season.

== Personal life and death ==
Bujnoch and his wife, Sue, resided in Cincinnati, Ohio. They were the parents of former University of Cincinnati offensive lineman and three-year starter (2005–07) Digger Bujnoch, and Austen Bujnoch, also a three-year starter (2011–13) for the Bearcats.

Glenn Bujnoch died on September 28, 2023, at age 69.
