= Bo Harris =

American football player (born 1953)

No. 53
- Position: Linebacker

Personal information
- Born: January 16, 1953 (age 73); Leesville, Louisiana, U.S.
- Listed height: 6 ft 3 in (1.91 m)
- Listed weight: 225 lb (102 kg)

Career information
- High school: Captain Shreve (LA)
- College: LSU
- NFL draft: 1975: 3rd round, 77th overall pick

Career history
- Cincinnati Bengals (1975–1982)

Awards and highlights
- Second-team All-SEC (1973)

Career NFL statistics
- Sacks: 16.5
- Interceptions: 7
- Fumble recoveries: 5
- Stats at Pro Football Reference

Clinton Lee Harris Jr., known as Bo Harris (born January 16, 1953), is an American former professional football player who was a linebacker for eight seasons in the National Football League (NFL) with the Cincinnati Bengals. Harris played college football for the LSU Tigers. He was drafted in the third round with the 77th overall pick in the 1975 NFL Draft.
