= Scott Perry (American football) =

American football player (born 1954)

No. 32
- Position: Defensive back

Personal information
- Born: March 11, 1954 (age 72); Pleasanton, California, U.S.
- Listed height: 6 ft 0 in (1.83 m)
- Listed weight: 180 lb (82 kg)

Career information
- High school: Kent School (Kent, Connecticut)
- College: Williams
- NFL draft: 1976: 5th round, 147th overall pick

Career history
- Cincinnati Bengals (1976–1979); San Francisco 49ers (1980); San Diego Chargers (1980); Green Bay Packers (1981)*
- * Offseason or practice squad member only

Career NFL statistics
- Interceptions: 4
- Touchdowns: 2
- Return yards: 70
- Stats at Pro Football Reference

Scott Endecott Perry (born March 11, 1954) is an American former professional football player who was a defensive back in the National Football League (NFL). He played for the Cincinnati Bengals from 1976 to 1979. In 1980, he played for the San Francisco 49ers and San Diego Chargers. He played college football for the Williams Ephs.

== Biography ==
Perry was born in Pleasanton, California, and played prep football at Kent School in Kent, Connecticut. He played college football at Williams College.

Perry was selected by the Bengals in the fifth round (147th overall) of the 1976 NFL draft. He played four seasons with the Bengals, where he caught four interceptions and returned two for touchdowns.

After leaving the NFL, Perry became a first grade teacher at Point Fermin Elementary School in the Los Angeles Unified School District.
