= Vernon Holland =

American football player (1948–1998)

Vern Holland
No. 76, 68, 77
- Position: Tackle

Personal information
- Born: June 27, 1948; San Antonio, Texas, U.S.
- Died: April 21, 1998 (aged 49); Nashville, Tennessee, U.S.
- Listed height: 6 ft 5 in (1.96 m)
- Listed weight: 268 lb (122 kg)

Career information
- College: Tennessee State
- NFL draft: 1971: 1st round, 15th overall pick

Career history
- Cincinnati Bengals (1971–1979); Detroit Lions (1980); New York Giants (1980)

Career NFL statistics
- Games played: 131
- Games started: 123
- Stats at Pro Football Reference

Vernon Edward "Vern" Holland (June 28, 1948 – April 21, 1998) was an American professional football player who was an offensive tackle in the National Football League (NFL) for the Cincinnati Bengals, Detroit Lions, and New York Giants.

Holland was born in San Antonio, Texas and grew up in Sherman, Texas. He played college football at Tennessee State University in Nashville, Tennessee. Holland was an all-American at Tennessee State, where he played from 1967 to 1970.

He was selected in the first round (15th overall) of the 1971 NFL draft by the Bengals.

Holland played right tackle in Cincinnati, where he anchored the offensive line throughout the 1970s. For nine years, from the 1971 season through the 1979 season, he played in 119 games for the Bengals, starting all but one of those. He played in every Bengals game in eight of his nine seasons in Cincinnati.

In 1975, he was named second team All-American Football Conference (AFC) by UPI.

He was also known for expensive clothes, carrying a briefcase because he considered football serious business, and the nickname "Suki."

The Bengals cut Holland prior to the 1980 season, partly to make way for rookie (and future Hall-of-Famer) Anthony Muñoz.

In 1980, he played 10 games, starting five, for the New York Giants, then two games for the Detroit Lions. It was the final season of his 10-year NFL career.

He later worked in the security department of the Nashville Arena. He died at age 49 of a heart attack on April 21, 1998, in Nashville.

The Ohio Valley Conference, of which Holland's alma mater, Tennessee State, is a member, annually awards the Vernon Holland Scholarship to promote the graduate-level studies of former OVC student-athletes interested in a career tied to sports.
