= 1971 Cincinnati Bengals season =

NFL team season

- Head coach: Paul Brown
- Home stadium: Riverfront Stadium

Results
- Record: 4–10 (.286)
- Division place: 4th AFC Central
- Playoffs: Did not qualify

The 1971 Cincinnati Bengals season was the franchise's 2nd season in the National Football League, and the 4th overall. Cornerback Lemar Parrish set a team record with seven interceptions, including one for a 65-yard score, Cincinnati's first-ever interception return for a touchdown. The Bengals, coming off their first division-winning season of 1970, drafted quarterback Ken Anderson in the third round of the 1971 NFL Draft. Anderson would go on to play 16 seasons for the club and set numerous team passing records.

While 1971 proved to be a disappointment, losing six games by four points or less, statistically this was the first year the Bengals led their opponents in almost every category, including point differential (+19); Cincinnati's .286 winning percentage is the lowest in NFL history by a team with a positive point differential.

== Offseason ==
=== NFL draft ===
1971 Cincinnati Bengals draft
Round	Pick	Player	Position	College	Notes
1	15	Vernon Holland	Offensive tackle	Tennessee State	
2	41	Steve Lawson	Guard	Kansas	
3	67	Ken Anderson *	Quarterback	Augustana	
4	93	Fred Willis	Running back	Boston College	
5	110	Art May	Defensive end	Tuskegee	
7	171	Neal Craig	Defensive back	Fisk	
8	197	Fred Herring	Defensive back	Tennessee State	
9	223	Gary Gustafson	Linebacker	Montana State	
10	249	Jack Stambaugh	Guard	Oregon	
11	275	Ed Marshall	Wide receiver	Cameron	
12	301	James Hayden	Defensive end	Memphis	
13	327	David Knapman	Tight end	Central Washington	
14	353	Irvin Mallory	Defensive back	Virginia Union	
15	379	Bob Thomas	Running back	Arizona State	
16	405	Mark Debevc	Linebacker	Ohio State	
17	432	Sam Pearson	Defensive back	Western Kentucky	
Made roster * Made at least one Pro Bowl during career

== Personnel ==
=== Staff ===
1971 Cincinnati Bengals staff
Front office: President – John Sawyer; Director of Player Personnel – Pete Brown; Head coaches: Head Coach/General Manager – Paul Brown; Offensive coaches: Quarterbacks/Receivers – Bill Walsh; Offensive Backfield – Jack Donaldson; Offensive Line – Bill Johnson	Defensive coaches: Defensive Coordinator/Defensive Backfield – Chuck Weber; Defensive Line – Chuck Studley; Linebackers – Vince Costello

=== Roster ===
1971 Cincinnati Bengals roster
Quarterbacks (QB): 14 Ken Anderson; 11 Virgil Carter; Running backs (RB): 44 Doug Dressler; 19 Essex Johnson; 40 Ron Lamb; 30 Jess Phillips; 18 Paul Robinson; 33 Fred Willis; Wide receivers (WR): 35 Mike Haffner; 83 Ed Marshall; 25 Chip Myers; 17 Speedy Thomas; Tight ends (TE): 88 Bruce Coslet; 87 Mike Kelly; 84 Bob Trumpy	Offensive linemen (OL): 63 Guy Dennis G/C; 72 Howard Fest G; 76 Vernon Holland T; 54 Bob Johnson C; 68 Steve Lawson G; 73 Pat Matson G; 71 Rufus Mayes T; Defensive linemen (DL): 82 Royce Berry DE; 70 Ron Carpenter DE; 79 Steve Chomyszak DT; 80 Ken Johnson DE/DT; 78 Willie Jones DE; 74 Mike Reid DT; 81 Nick Roman DE	Linebackers (LB): 52 Doug Adams MLB; 51 Ken Avery OLB; 58 Al Beauchamp OLB; 66 Bill Bergey MLB; 59 Larry Ely MLB; 53 Bill Peterson OLB; Defensive backs (DB): 23 Al Coleman FS; 34 Neal Craig SS; 29 Sandy Durko FS; 20 Lemar Parrish CB; 13 Ken Riley CB; 31 Fletcher Smith SS; Special teams (ST): 15 Dave Lewis P; 16 Horst Mühlmann K	Reserve: 12 Greg Cook QB (IR); 27 Ken Dyer S (IR); 75 Ernie Wright T (IR); Rookies in italics

== Regular season ==
=== Schedule ===
Week	Date	Opponent	Result	Record	Venue	Recap
1	September 19	Philadelphia Eagles	**W** 37–14	1–0	Riverfront Stadium	Recap
2	September 26	at **Pittsburgh Steelers**	**L** 10–21	1–1	Three Rivers Stadium	Recap
3	October 3	at Green Bay Packers	**L** 17–20	1–2	Lambeau Field	Recap
4	October 10	Miami Dolphins	**L** 13–23	1–3	Riverfront Stadium	Recap
5	October 17	**Cleveland Browns**	**L** 24–27	1–4	Riverfront Stadium	Recap
6	October 24	at Oakland Raiders	**L** 27–31	1–5	Oakland Coliseum	Recap
7	October 31	at **Houston Oilers**	**L** 6–10	1–6	Astrodome	Recap
8	November 7	Atlanta Falcons	**L** 6–9	1–7	Riverfront Stadium	Recap
9	November 14	at Denver Broncos	**W** 24–10	2–7	Mile High Stadium	Recap
10	November 21	**Houston Oilers**	**W** 28–13	3–7	Riverfront Stadium	Recap
11	November 28	San Diego Chargers	**W** 31–0	4–7	Riverfront Stadium	Recap
12	December 5	at **Cleveland Browns**	**L** 27–31	4–8	Cleveland Stadium	Recap
13	December 12	**Pittsburgh Steelers**	**L** 13–21	4–9	Riverfront Stadium	Recap
14	December 19	at New York Jets	**L** 21–35	4–10	Shea Stadium	Recap
Note: Intra-division opponents are in **bold** text.

=== Season summary ===
==== Week 1 vs Eagles ====
Week One: Philadelphia Eagles (0–0) at Cincinnati Bengals (0–0)

Quarter	1	2	3	4	Total
Eagles	0	7	0	7	**14**
Bengals	0	10	17	10	**37**

at Riverfront Stadium • Cincinnati, Ohio

- Date: September 19
- Game time: 1:00 p.m. EDT
- Game weather: 68 °F (20 °C) • Wind 6 miles per hour (9.7 km/h; 5.2 kn)
- Pro-Football-Reference.com

Game information

Eagles

- Pete Liske
  20/40, 301 Yds, 2 TD, 3 INT
- Tom Woodeshick
  7 Rush, 29 Yds
- Ben Hawkins
  7 Rec, 118 Yds, 2 TD

Bengals

- Virgil Carter
  22/30, 273 Yds, 3 TD
- Essex Johnson
  8 Rush, 113 Yds, TD
- Speedy Thomas
  4 Rec, 122 Yds, TD

Scoring summary

Quarter	Time	Drive			Team	Scoring information	Score	
Quarter	Time	Plays	Yards	TOP	Team	Scoring information	PHI	CIN
2					Bengals	Eric Crabtree 2-yard touchdown reception from Virgil Carter, Horst Muhlmann kick good	0	7
2					Eagles	Ben Hawkins 10-yard touchdown reception from Pete Liske, Happy Feller kick good	7	7
2					Bengals	36-yard field goal by Horst Muhlmann	7	10
3					Bengals	Speedy Thomas 90-yard touchdown reception from Virgil Carter, Horst Muhlmann kick good	7	17
3					Bengals	35-yard field goal by Horst Muhlmann	7	20
4					Bengals	Jess Phillips 7-yard touchdown reception from Virgil Carter, Horst Muhlmann kick good	7	27
4					Eagles	Ben Hawkins 15-yard touchdown reception from Pete Liske, Happy Feller kick good	14	27
4					Bengals	Essex Johnson 68-yard touchdown run, Horst Muhlmann kick good	14	34
4					Bengals	26-yard field goal by Horst Muhlmann	14	37
"TOP" = time of possession. For other American football terms, see Glossary of American football.							14	37

=== Standings ===
AFC Central
	W	L	T	PCT	DIV	CONF	PF	PA	STK
Cleveland Browns	9	5	0	.643	5–1	7–4	285	273	W5
Pittsburgh Steelers	6	8	0	.429	4–2	5–6	246	292	L1
Houston Oilers	4	9	1	.308	2–4	4–7	251	330	W3
Cincinnati Bengals	4	10	0	.286	1–5	3–8	284	265	L3

Note: Tie games were not officially counted in the standings until 1972.

=== Team stats ===
1971 Cincinnati Bengals Team Stats
TEAM STATS	Bengals	Opponents
TOTAL FIRST DOWNS	236	213
Rushing	109	93
Passing	115	102
Penalty	12	18
TOTAL NET YARDS	4266	3906
Avg Per Game	304.7	279.0
Total Plays	867	811
Avg. Per Play	4.9	4.8
NET YARDS RUSHING	2142	1778
Avg. Per Game	153.0	127.0
Total Rushes	462	446
NET YARDS PASSING	2124	2128
Avg. Per Game	151.7	152.0
Sacked Yards Lost	40–303	30–254
Gross Yards	2427	2382
Att. Completions	365–214	335–157
Completion Pct.	58.6	46.9
Intercepted	11	27
PUNTS-AVERAGE	73–44.7	73–40.9
PENALTIES-YARDS	82-921	72–722
FUMBLES-BALL LOST	29–12	21–12
TOUCHDOWNS	32	32
Rushing	14	11
Passing	15	19
Returns	3	2

Score by Periods	1	2	3	4	Tot
Bengals	58	64	91	71	284
Opponents	44	71	48	102	265

=== Team leaders ===
- Passing: Virgil Carter (222 Att, 138 Comp, 1624 Yds, 62.2 Pct, 10 TD, 7 Int, 86.2 Rating)
- Rushing: Fred Willis (135 Att, 590 Yds, 4.4 Avg, 36 Long, 7 TD)
- Receiving: Bob Trumpy (40 Rec, 531 Yds, 13.3 Avg, 44 Long, 3 TD)
- Scoring: Horst Muhlmann, 91 points (20 FG; 31 PAT)

== Awards and records ==
=== Pro Bowl selections ===
- CB Lemar Parrish
