= 1970 Cincinnati Bengals season =

NFL team season

- General manager: Paul Brown
- Head coach: Paul Brown
- Home stadium: Riverfront Stadium

Results
- Record: 8–6
- Division place: 1st AFC Central
- Playoffs: Lost Divisional Playoffs (at Colts) 0–17

The 1970 Cincinnati Bengals season was the franchise's first season in the National Football League (NFL), and the third overall. The NFL-AFL merger took place before the season and the Bengals, who were placed in the same division as the "old-guard NFL" Cleveland Browns and Pittsburgh Steelers, were not expected to be playoff contenders. Nevertheless, the Bengals made their first NFL campaign a memorable one. After winning their first ever game as a member of the NFL, their inaugural game in the brand new Riverfront Stadium, they would lose six games in a row.

After the 1–6 start, the Bengals would win the rest of their games, rallying to an 8–6 finish and champions of the newly formed AFC Central division. In their first playoff game, the Bengals lost 17–0, to the eventual Super Bowl champion Baltimore Colts. Cincinnati quarterback Greg Cook was forced to the Injured Reserve list in training camp with a shoulder injury that would ultimately end his career; Virgil Carter took over as the starter. In just their third season, the 1970 Bengals set a league mark by being the first NFL expansion team to qualify for the playoffs within their first three seasons of existence. The team is one of only four teams since the 1970 merger to start the season 1–5 or worse and qualify for the playoffs, the others being the 2015 Kansas City Chiefs, the 2018 Indianapolis Colts, and the 2020 Washington Football Team.

== Offseason ==
=== NFL draft ===
1970 Cincinnati Bengals draft
Round	Pick	Player	Position	College	Notes
1	7	Mike Reid *	Defensive tackle	Penn State	
2	32	Ron Carpenter	Defensive tackle	North Carolina State	
3	60	Chip Bennett	Linebacker	Abilene Christian	
4	85	Joe Stephen	Guard	Jackson State	
4	104	Billie Hayes	Defensive back	San Diego State	
6	138	Sandy Durko	Defensive back	USC	
7	163	Lemar Parrish *	Defensive back	Lincoln (MO)	
8	188	Bill Trout	Defensive tackle	Miami (FL)	
9	216	Bill Bolden	Running back	UCLA	
10	241	Nick Roman	Linebacker	Ohio State	
11	266	Samuel Wallace	Offensive tackle	Grambling State	
12	294	Thomas Truesdell	Defensive end	Ohio Wesleyan	
13	319	Paul Dunn	Wide receiver	U.S. International	
14	344	Joe Johnson	Wide receiver	Johnson C. Smith	
15	372	Marvin Weeks	Defensive back	Alcorn State	
16	397	Larry Ely	Linebacker	Iowa	
17	422	Richard Smith	Running back	Washington State	
Made roster * Made at least one Pro Bowl during career

=== Undrafted free agents ===
1970 undrafted free agents of note
Player	Position	College
Dennis Blank	Center	Cincinnati
Jim Del Gaizo	Quarterback	Tampa
Doug Dressler	Running back	Chico State
Mike Kelly	Tight end	Davidson

== Personnel ==
=== Staff / Coaches ===
1970 Cincinnati Bengals staff
Front office: Owner/General Manager - Paul Brown; President – John Sawyer; Director of Player Personnel – Pete Brown; Head coaches: Head Coach/General Manager – Paul Brown; Offensive coaches: Offensive Backfield – Jack Donaldson; Receivers – Bill Walsh; Offensive Line – Bill Johnson	Defensive coaches: Defensive Coordinator/Defensive Backfield – Chuck Weber; Defensive Line – Chuck Studley; Linebackers – Vince Costello

=== Final roster ===
1970 Cincinnati Bengals roster
Quarterbacks (QB): 11 Virgil Carter; 14 Sam Wyche; Running backs (RB): 44 Doug Dressler; 19 Essex Johnson; 40 Ron Lamb; 30 Jess Phillips; 18 Paul Robinson; Wide receivers (WR): 10 Eric Crabtree; 25 Chip Myers; 17 Speedy Thomas; Tight ends (TE): 88 Bruce Coslet; 87 Mike Kelly; 84 Bob Trumpy	Offensive linemen (OL): 63 Guy Dennis G/C; 72 Howard Fest T; 54 Bob Johnson C; 73 Pat Matson G; 71 Rufus Mayes G; 67 Michael Wilson T; 75 Ernie Wright T; Defensive linemen (DL): 85 Martin Baccaglio DE; 82 Royce Berry DE; 70 Ron Carpenter DE; 79 Steve Chomyszak DT; 78 Willie Jones DT; 74 Mike Reid DT; 81 Nick Roman DE	Linebackers (LB): 51 Ken Avery OLB; 58 Al Beauchamp OLB; 66 Bill Bergey MLB; 65 Wayne McClure OLB; 53 Bill Peterson OLB; Defensive backs (DB): 23 Al Coleman FS; 27 Ken Dyer FS; 28 John Guillory CB; 20 Lemar Parrish CB; 13 Ken Riley CB; 31 Fletcher Smith SS; Special teams (ST): 15 Dave Lewis P; 16 Horst Mühlmann K	Practice squad: 21 Paul Dunn RB; 59 Larry Ely LB; 80 Ken Johnson DE; 24 Tommie Smith WR; 77 Bob Wells T; Reserve: -- Chip Bennett LB (IR); 12 Greg Cook QB (IR); 29 Sandy Durko S (IR); Rookies in italics

== Regular season ==
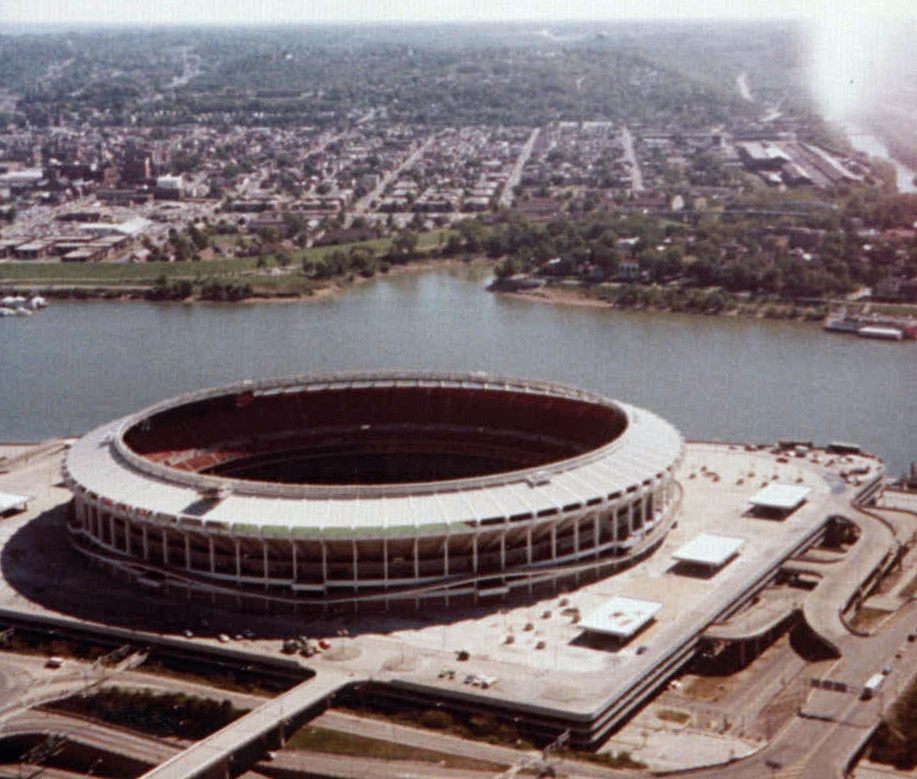
The Bengals began playing home games at Riverfront Stadium in 1970

The Bengals set a league record for most points in a game scored by the special teams, with 31 in a 43–14 victory at Buffalo on November 8, 1970. Cornerback Lemar Parrish scored two special teams touchdowns: one on a 95-yard kickoff return, and another on an 83-yard return of a blocked field goal attempt. Parrish is the only Bengals player ever to score two touchdowns in a game on returns and/or recoveries — and he did it three times. Kicker Horst Muhlmann added 15 points on five field goals, and four extra points by Muhlmann completed the special teams onslaught. The offense scored only one touchdown, a one-yard run by running back Jess Phillips. The defense scored a touchdown on an eight-yard fumble return by defensive end Royce Berry.

=== Schedule ===
Week	Date	Opponent	Result	Record	Venue	Recap
1	September 20	Oakland Raiders	**W** 31–21	1–0	Riverfront Stadium	Recap
2	September 27	at Detroit Lions	**L** 3–38	1–1	Tiger Stadium	Recap
3	October 4	**Houston Oilers**	**L** 13–20	1–2	Riverfront Stadium	Recap
4	October 11	at **Cleveland Browns**	**L** 27–30	1–3	Cleveland Stadium	Recap
5	October 18	Kansas City Chiefs	**L** 19–27	1–4	Riverfront Stadium	Recap
6	October 25	at Washington Redskins	**L** 0–20	1–5	Robert F. Kennedy Memorial Stadium	Recap
7	November 2	at **Pittsburgh Steelers**	**L** 10–21	1–6	Three Rivers Stadium	Recap
8	November 8	at Buffalo Bills	**W** 43–14	2–6	War Memorial Stadium	Recap
9	November 15	**Cleveland Browns**	**W** 14–10	3–6	Riverfront Stadium	Recap
10	November 22	**Pittsburgh Steelers**	**W** 34–7	4–6	Riverfront Stadium	Recap
11	November 29	New Orleans Saints	**W** 26–6	5–6	Riverfront Stadium	Recap
12	December 6	at San Diego Chargers	**W** 17–14	6–6	San Diego Stadium	Recap
13	December 13	at **Houston Oilers**	**W** 30–20	7–6	Astrodome	Recap
14	December 20	Boston Patriots	**W** 45–7	8–6	Riverfront Stadium	Recap
Note: Intra-division opponents are in **bold** text.

=== Standings ===
AFC Central
	W	L	T	PCT	DIV	CONF	PF	PA	STK
Cincinnati Bengals	8	6	0	.571	3–3	7–4	312	255	W7
Cleveland Browns	7	7	0	.500	4–2	7–4	286	265	W1
Pittsburgh Steelers	5	9	0	.357	3–3	5–6	210	272	L3
Houston Oilers	3	10	1	.231	2–4	3–7–1	217	352	L3

Note: Tie games were not officially counted in the standings until 1972.

=== Season summary ===
==== Week 1 vs Raiders ====
Week One: Oakland Raiders (0–0) at Cincinnati Bengals (0–0)

Quarter	1	2	3	4	Total
Raiders	7	0	14	0	**21**
**Bengals**	7	7	14	3	**31**

at Riverfront Stadium, Cincinnati, Ohio

- Date: September 20, 1970
- Game time: 1:00 p.m.
- Game weather: 74 °F (23 °C)
- Game attendance: 56,616
- Pro-Football-Reference.com

Game information

**First quarter**

- CIN – Sam Wyche 5-yard run (Horst Muhlmann kick). Bengals 7–0. Drive:
- OAK – Fred Biletnikoff 20-yard pass from Daryle Lamonica (George Blanda kick). Tie 7–7. Drive:

**Second quarter**

- CIN – Essex Johnson 51-yard pass from Sam Wyche (Horst Muhlmann kick). Bengals 14–7. Drive:

**Third quarter**

- CIN – Paul Robinson 3-yard run (Horst Muhlmann kick). Bengals 21–7. Drive:
- OAK – Fred Biletnikoff 18-yard pass from Daryle Lamonica (George Blanda kick). Bengals 21–14. Drive:
- OAK – Alvin Wyatt 63-yard punt return (George Blanda kick). Tie 21–21.
- CIN – Jess Phillips 76-yard run (Horst Muhlmann kick). Bengals 28–21. Drive:

**Fourth quarter**

- CIN – Horst Muhlmann 38-yard field goal. Bengals 31–21. Drive:

Top passers

- OAK – Daryle Lamonica – 17/36, 265 yards, 2 TD, 2 INT
- CIN – Sam Wyche – 8/18, 147 yards, TD

Top rushers

- OAK – Charlie Smith – 8 rushes, 29 yards
- CIN – Jess Phillips – 15 rushes, 130 yards, TD

Top receivers

- OAK – Fred Biletnikoff – 6 receptions, 113 yards, 2 TD
- CIN – Bob Trumpy – 4 receptions, 67 yards

=== Team stats ===
1970 Cincinnati Bengals Team Stats
TEAM STATS	Bengals	Opponents
TOTAL FIRST DOWNS	210	236
Rushing	100	87
Passing	97	131
Penalty	13	18
TOTAL NET YARDS	3927	4178
Avg Per Game	280.5	298.4
Total Plays	831	874
Avg. Per Play	4.7	4.8
NET YARDS RUSHING	2057	1543
Avg. Per Game	146.9	110.2
Total Rushes	461	418
NET YARDS PASSING	1870	2635
Avg. Per Game	133.6	188.2
Sacked Yards Lost	31–227	28–250
Gross Yards	2097	2885
Att. Completions	339–172	428–209
Completion Pct.	50.7	48.8
Intercepted	11	23
PUNTS-AVERAGE	79–46.2	80–43.8
PENALTIES-YARDS	71–831	81–784
FUMBLES-BALL LOST	22–12	28–16
TOUCHDOWNS	34	31
Rushing	16	11
Passing	12	18
Returns	6	2

Score by Periods	1	2	3	4	Tot
Bengals	56	111	85	60	312
Opponents	49	82	52	72	255

=== Team leaders ===
- Passing: Virgil Carter (278 Att, 143 Comp, 1647 Yds, 51.4 Pct, 9 TD, 9 Int, 66.9 Rating)
- Rushing: Jess Phillips (163 Att, 648 Yds, 4.0 Avg, 76 Long, 4 TD)
- Receiving: Chip Myers (32 Rec, 542 Yds, 16.9 Avg, 56 Long, 1 TD)
- Scoring: Horst Muhlmann, 108 points (25 FG; 33 PAT)

== Playoffs ==
Round	Date	Opponent	Result	Record	Venue	Recap
Divisional	December 26	at Baltimore Colts	L 0–17	0–1	Memorial Stadium	Recap

== Awards and records ==
=== Pro Bowl selections ===
- CB Lemar Parrish
- TE Bob Trumpy
