= 1972 Cincinnati Bengals season =

NFL team season

- Head coach: Paul Brown
- Home stadium: Riverfront Stadium

Results
- Record: 8–6
- Division place: 3rd AFC Central
- Playoffs: Did not qualify

The 1972 Cincinnati Bengals season was the franchise's 3rd season in the National Football League, and the 5th overall. Starting off the 1972 season winning five of seven games, the Bengals looked primed to win the division as they had in 1970. They lost a key divisional game at Pittsburgh, 40–17, followed by a pair of close losses at home against Oakland (20–14) and Baltimore (20–19). Head coach Paul Brown gave Ken Anderson the starting quarterback job, and the Bengals responded by winning three out of the last four games giving the Bengals an overall 8–6 season, but not good enough for the playoffs once again.

Three times in their history, the Bengals have won without scoring a touchdown, including September 24, 1972, when kicker Horst Muhlmann's five field goals (41, 32, 20, 32, 34) fueled a 15–10 victory over Pittsburgh at Riverfront Stadium (later renamed Cinergy Field). Twice in Bengals history, two Cincinnati players have broken the 100-yard rushing mark in the same game, with the first coming October 29, 1972, when fullback Doug Dressler gained 110 yards and halfback Essex Johnson ran for 103 yards in a 30–7 win versus Houston. The latest-drafted player ever to make the Bengals roster for a regular-season game was K-P Dave Green of Ohio University. Green was the 418th selection in the 1972 draft, taken in the 17th round. He did not make the roster in 1972 and had a brief stint (no games played) with Houston in 1973 before being re-acquired by Cincinnati.

== Offseason ==
=== NFL draft ===
1972 Cincinnati Bengals draft
Round	Pick	Player	Position	College	Notes
1	2	Sherman White	Defensive end	California	
2	29	Tommy Casanova *	Defensive back	LSU	
3	54	Jim LeClair *	Linebacker	North Dakota	
4	81	Bernard Jackson	Defensive back	Washington State	
5	106	Tom DeLeone *	Center	Ohio State	
7	158	Steve Conley	Running back	Kansas	
8	185	Dan Kratzer	Wide receiver	Missouri Valley	
9	210	Stan Walters *	Offensive tackle	Syracuse	
10	237	Brian Foster	Defensive back	Colorado	
11	261	Kent Pederson	Tight end	UC Santa Barbara	
12	289	Rick Wegis	Defensive back	Cal Poly San Luis Obispo	
13	314	James Hamilton	Quarterback	Arizona State	
14	341	Steve Porter	Wide receiver	Indiana	
15	366	Hosea Minnieweather	Defensive tackle	Jackson State	
16	393	John Wiegman	Wide receiver	Cal Poly Pomona	
17	418	Dave Green	Punter	Ohio	
Made roster * Made at least one Pro Bowl during career

== Personnel ==
=== Staff ===
1972 Cincinnati Bengals staff
Front office: President – John Sawyer; Director of Player Personnel – Pete Brown; Head coaches: Head Coach/General Manager – Paul Brown; Offensive coaches: Quarterbacks/Receivers – Bill Walsh; Offensive Backfield – Jack Donaldson; Offensive Line – Bill Johnson	Defensive coaches: Defensive Coordinator/Defensive Backfield – Chuck Weber; Defensive Line – Chuck Studley; Linebackers – Vince Costello

=== Roster ===
1972 Cincinnati Bengals roster
Quarterbacks (QB): 14 Ken Anderson; 11 Virgil Carter; Running backs (RB): 44 Doug Dressler; 19 Essex Johnson; 26 Reece Morrison; 30 Jess Phillips; 40 Pete Watson; Wide receivers (WR): 89 Drew Buie; 18 Charlie Joiner; 25 Chip Myers; 17 Speedy Thomas; Tight ends (TE): 88 Bruce Coslet; 87 Mike Kelly; 84 Bob Trumpy	Offensive linemen (OL): 50 Tom DeLeone C/G; 72 Howard Fest G; 76 Vernon Holland T; 54 Bob Johnson C; 68 Steve Lawson G; 73 Pat Matson G; 75 Stan Walters T; Defensive linemen (DL): 82 Royce Berry DE; 70 Ron Carpenter DT; 79 Steve Chomyszak DT; 80 Ken Johnson DE/DT; 74 Mike Reid DT; 83 Sherman White DE	Linebackers (LB): 52 Doug Adams MLB; 51 Ken Avery OLB; 58 Al Beauchamp OLB; 66 Bill Bergey MLB; 56 Tim Kearney OLB; 55 Jim LeClair OLB; 53 Bill Peterson OLB; 60 Ron Pritchard OLB; Defensive backs (DB): 37 Tommy Casanova FS; 34 Neal Craig SS; 23 Bernard Jackson CB; 24 Ernie Kellermann FS; 20 Lemar Parrish CB; 13 Ken Riley CB; Special teams (ST): 15 Dave Lewis P; 16 Horst Mühlmann K	Practice squad: 63 Guy Dennis G; 41 Dave Green K/P; 78 Willie Jones DE; -- Dan Kratzer WR; Reserve: 12 Greg Cook (IR); 29 Sandy Durko S (IR); 71 Rufus Mayes T (IR); Rookies in italics

== Regular season ==
=== Schedule ===
Week	Date	Opponent	Result	Record	Venue	Recap
1	September 17	at New England Patriots	**W** 31–7	1–0	Schaefer Stadium	Recap
2	September 24	**Pittsburgh Steelers**	**W** 15–10	2–0	Riverfront Stadium	Recap
3	October 1	at **Cleveland Browns**	**L** 6–27	2–1	Cleveland Stadium	Recap
4	October 8	Denver Broncos	**W** 21–10	3–1	Riverfront Stadium	Recap
5	October 15	at Kansas City Chiefs	**W** 23–16	4–1	Arrowhead Stadium	Recap
6	October 22	at Los Angeles Rams	**L** 12–15	4–2	Los Angeles Memorial Coliseum	Recap
7	October 29	**Houston Oilers**	**W** 30–7	5–2	Riverfront Stadium	Recap
8	November 5	at **Pittsburgh Steelers**	**L** 17–40	5–3	Three Rivers Stadium	Recap
9	November 12	Oakland Raiders	**L** 14–20	5–4	Riverfront Stadium	Recap
10	November 19	Baltimore Colts	**L** 19–20	5–5	Riverfront Stadium	Recap
11	November 26	at Chicago Bears	**W** 13–3	6–5	Soldier Field	Recap
12	December 3	New York Giants	**W** 13–10	7–5	Riverfront Stadium	Recap
13	December 9	**Cleveland Browns**	**L** 24–27	7–6	Riverfront Stadium	Recap
14	December 17	at **Houston Oilers**	**W** 61–17	8–6	Astrodome	Recap
Note: Intra-division opponents are in **bold** text.

=== Season summary ===
==== Week 1 at Patriots ====
Week One: Cincinnati Bengals (0–0) at New England Patriots (0–0)

Quarter	1	2	3	4	Total
**Bengals**	7	3	7	14	**31**
Patriots	0	7	0	0	**7**

at Schaefer Stadium, Foxboro, Massachusetts

- Date: September 17, 1972
- Game time: 1:00 p.m. EST
- Game weather: 74 °F (23 °C) • Wind 19 miles per hour (31 km/h; 17 kn)
- Game attendance: 60,999
- Box Score

Game information

First quarter

- CIN – Essex Johnson 14-yard run (Horst Muhlmann kick). Bengals 7–0. Drive:

Second quarter

- CIN – Horst Muhlmann 38-yard field goal. Bengals 10–0. Drive:
- NE – Larry Carwell 45-yard blocked field goal return (Mike Walker kick). Bengals 10–7.

Third quarter

- CIN – Jess Phillips 1-yard run (Horst Muhlmann kick). Bengals 17–7. Drive:

Fourth quarter

- CIN – Lemar Parrish 51-yard punt return (Horst Muhlmann kick). Bengals 24–7.
- CIN – Bob Trumpy 11-yard pass from Ken Anderson (Horst Muhlmann kick). Bengals 31–7. Drive:

Top passers

- CIN – Ken Anderson – 10/15, 102 yards, TD
- NE – Jim Plunkett – 9/17, 117 yards, 2 INT

Top rushers

- CIN – Essex Johnson – 15 rushes, 82 yards, TD
- NE – Carl Garrett – 12 rushes, 34 yards

Top receivers

- CIN – Chip Myers – 3 receptions, 42 yards
- NE – Carl Garrett – 1 reception, 35 yards

=== Standings ===
AFC Central
	W	L	T	PCT	DIV	CONF	PF	PA	STK
Pittsburgh Steelers	11	3	0	.786	4–2	9–2	343	175	W4
Cleveland Browns	10	4	0	.714	5–1	9–2	268	249	W2
Cincinnati Bengals	8	6	0	.571	3–3	6–5	299	229	W1
Houston Oilers	1	13	0	.071	0–6	1–10	164	380	L11

=== Team stats ===
1972 Cincinnati Bengals Team Stats
TEAM STATS	Bengals	Opponents
TOTAL FIRST DOWNS	255	207
Rushing	112	98
Passing	122	92
Penalty	21	17
TOTAL NET YARDS	4317	3552
Avg Per Game	308.4	253.7
Total Plays	899	794
Avg. Per Play	4.8	4.5
NET YARDS RUSHING	1996	1815
Avg. Per Game	142.6	129.6
Total Rushes	491	406
NET YARDS PASSING	2321	1737
Avg. Per Game	165.8	124.1
Sacked Yards Lost	24–192	38–296
Gross Yards	2513	2033
Att. Completions	384–219	350–167
Completion Pct.	57.0	47.7
Intercepted	11	20
PUNTS-AVERAGE	66–42.1	84.42.4
PENALTIES-YARDS	76–738	69–581
FUMBLES-BALL LOST	28–18	30–9
TOUCHDOWNS	31	24
Rushing	16	11
Passing	10	11
Returns	5	2

Score by Periods	1	2	3	4	Tot
Bengals	36	62	99	102	299
Opponents	37	79	42	71	229

=== Team leaders ===
- Passing: Ken Anderson (301 Att, 171 Comp, 1918 Yds, 56.8 Pct, 7 TD, 7 Int, 74.0 Rating)
- Rushing: Essex Johnson (212 Att, 825 Yds, 3.9 Avg, 19 Long, 4 TD)
- Receiving: Chip Myers (57 Rec, 792 Yds, 13.9 Avg, 42 Long, 3 TD)
- Scoring: Horst Muhlmann, 111 points (27 FG; 30 PAT)

== Awards and records ==
=== Pro Bowl selections ===
- DT Mike Reid
- WR Chip Myers
