= 1973 Cincinnati Bengals season =

NFL team season

- Head coach: Paul Brown
- Home stadium: Riverfront Stadium

Results
- Record: 10–4
- Division place: 1st AFC Central
- Playoffs: Lost Divisional Playoffs (at Dolphins) 16–34

The 1973 Cincinnati Bengals season was the franchise's 4th season in the National Football League, and the 6th overall.

The Bengals split their first eight games, then swept their last six to win their second AFC Central Division title. Cincinnati qualified for the postseason but lost in the Divisional Playoffs to the Super Bowl winner, the Miami Dolphins 34–16.

RB Essex Johnson became the first Bengal to achieve 100+ yards rushing and receiving in the same game. He rushed for 121 yards on 21 carries and got 116 yards on two receptions on Sep 30, 1973 at San Diego. Perhaps one of the best marks of the season for the Bengals was giving the eventual NFC Champion Minnesota Vikings their most lopsided loss of the season 27–0.

== Offseason ==
=== NFL draft ===
1973 Cincinnati Bengals draft
Round	Pick	Player	Position	College	Notes
1	15	Isaac Curtis *	Wide receiver	San Diego State	
2	43	Al Chandler	Tight end	Oklahoma	
3	68	Tim George	Wide receiver	Carson–Newman	
5	121	Bob McCall	Running back	Arizona	
6	146	Bob Jones	Defensive back	Virginia Union	
7	171	Bob Maddox	Defensive end	Frostburg State	
8	199	Joe Wilson	Running back	Holy Cross	
9	224	John Dampeer	Guard	Notre Dame	
10	249	Lenvil Elliott	Running back	Northeast Missouri State	
11	277	William Montgomery	Defensive back	Morehouse	
12	302	Boobie Clark	Running back	Bethune–Cookman	
13	327	Brooks West	Defensive tackle	UTEP	
14	355	Hurles Scales	Defensive back	North Texas State	
15	380	Ted McNulty	Quarterback	Indiana	
16	405	Harry Unger	Running back	Auburn	
17	433	Wayne Estabrook	Quarterback	Whittier	
Made roster * Made at least one Pro Bowl during career

== Personnel ==
=== Staff ===
1973 Cincinnati Bengals staff
Front office: President – John Sawyer; Director of Player Personnel – Pete Brown; Head coaches: Head Coach/General Manager – Paul Brown; Offensive coaches: Quarterbacks/Receivers – Bill Walsh; Offensive Backfield – Jack Donaldson; Offensive Line – Bill Johnson	Defensive coaches: Defensive Coordinator/Defensive Backfield – Chuck Weber; Defensive Line – Chuck Studley; Linebackers – Vince Costello

=== Roster ===
1973 Cincinnati Bengals roster
Quarterbacks (QB): 14 Ken Anderson; 12 Greg Cook; 17 Mike Ernst; Running backs (RB): 35 Boobie Clark; 36 Lenvil Elliott; 19 Essex Johnson; 26 Reece Morrison; 43 Ed Williams; 46 Joe Wilson; Wide receivers (WR): 85 Isaac Curtis; 89 Tim George; 18 Charlie Joiner; Tight ends (TE): 81 Al Chandler; 88 Bruce Coslet; 84 Bob Trumpy	Offensive linemen (OL): 50 Tom DeLeone C/G; 72 Howard Fest G; 76 Vernon Holland T; 54 Bob Johnson C; 73 Pat Matson G; 71 Rufus Mayes T; 64 John Shinners G; Defensive linemen (DL): 82 Royce Berry DE; 70 Ron Carpenter DT; 79 Steve Chomyszak DT; 80 Ken Johnson DE/DT; 74 Mike Reid DT; 78 Lee Thomas DE; 83 Sherman White DE	Linebackers (LB): 52 Doug Adams MLB; 51 Ken Avery OLB; 58 Al Beauchamp OLB; 66 Bill Bergey MLB; 56 Tim Kearney OLB; 55 Jim LeClair OLB; 60 Ron Pritchard OLB; Defensive backs (DB): 29 Lyle Blackwood FS; 37 Tommy Casanova FS; 34 Neal Craig SS; 23 Bernard Jackson FS/CB; 32 Bob Jones SS; 20 Lemar Parrish CB; 13 Ken Riley CB; Special teams (ST): 15 Dave Lewis P; 16 Horst Mühlmann K	Reserve: 11 Virgil Carter QB (IR); 44 Doug Dressler RB (IR); 77 Bob Maddox DE (IR); 25 Chip Myers WR (IR); 75 Stan Walters T (NF-Ill.); Rookies in italics

== Regular season ==
=== Schedule ===
Week	Date	Opponent	Result	Record	Venue	Attendance
1	September 16	at Denver Broncos	**L** 10–28	0–1	Mile High Stadium	49,059
2	September 23	**Houston Oilers**	**W** 24–10	1–1	Riverfront Stadium	51,823
3	September 30	at San Diego Chargers	**W** 20–13	2–1	San Diego Stadium	46,733
4	October 7	at **Cleveland Browns**	**L** 10–17	2–2	Cleveland Municipal Stadium	70,805
5	October 14	**Pittsburgh Steelers**	**W** 19–7	3–2	Riverfront Stadium	55,819
6	October 21	Kansas City Chiefs	**W** 14–6	4–2	Riverfront Stadium	56,397
7	October 28	at **Pittsburgh Steelers**	**L** 13–20	4–3	Three Rivers Stadium	45,761
8	November 4	at Dallas Cowboys	**L** 10–38	4–4	Texas Stadium	54,944
9	November 11	at Buffalo Bills	**W** 16–13	5–4	Rich Stadium	76,927
10	November 18	New York Jets	**W** 20–14	6–4	Riverfront Stadium	55,745
11	November 25	St. Louis Cardinals	**W** 42–24	7–4	Riverfront Stadium	50,918
12	December 2	Minnesota Vikings	**W** 27–0	8–4	Riverfront Stadium	57,859
13	December 9	**Cleveland Browns**	**W** 34–17	9–4	Riverfront Stadium	58,266
14	December 16	at **Houston Oilers**	**W** 27–24	10–4	Astrodome	21,955
Note: Intra-division opponents are in **bold** text.

=== Game summaries ===
==== Week 2 ====
Team	1	2	3	4	Total
Oilers	7	0	3	0	10
• Bengals	0	10	0	14	24

- Date: September 23
- Location: Riverfront Stadium, Cincinnati
- Game attendance: 51,823
- Game weather: 71 °F (22 °C); wind 9 mph (14 km/h)

Scoring summary
Q1	HOU	Gresham 103 yard kickoff return (Butler kick)	HOU 7–0
Q2	CIN	Johnson 11 yard run (Muhlmann kick)	Tie 7–7
Q2	CIN	Muhlmann 27 yard field goal	CIN 10–7
Q3	HOU	Butler 38 yard field goal	Tie 10–10
Q4	CIN	Clark 3 yard run (Muhlmann kick)	CIN 17–10
Q4	CIN	Trumpy 35 yard pass from Anderson (Muhlmann kick)	CIN 24–10

==== Week 5 vs Steelers ====
Pittsburgh Steelers (4–0) at Cincinnati Bengals (2–2)

Quarter	1	2	3	4	Total
Steelers	0	0	0	7	**7**
Bengals	6	3	7	3	**19**

at Riverfront Stadium • Cincinnati, Ohio

- Date: October 14
- Game time: 1:00 p.m.
- Game weather: 59 °F (15 °C) • Wind 8 mph (13 km/h)
- Game attendance: 55,819
- Referee: Dick Jorgensen
- Pro-Football-Reference.com

Game information

Steelers

- Terry Bradshaw
  9/14, 106 Yds, INT
- Preston Pearson
  12 Rush, 39 Yds, TD
- Ron Shanklin
  1 Rec, 67 Yds

Bengals

- Ken Anderson
  9/21, 78 Yds
- Boobie Clark
  28 Rush, 112 Yds, TD
- Isaac Curtis
  3 Rec, 46 Yds

Scoring summary

Quarter	Time	Drive			Team	Scoring information	Score	
Quarter	Time	Plays	Yards	TOP	Team	Scoring information	PIT	CIN
1					Bengals	20-yard field goal by Muhlmann	0	3
1					Bengals	19-yard field goal by Muhlmann	0	6
2					Bengals	20-yard field goal by Muhlmann	0	9
3					Bengals	Clark 3-yard touchdown run, Muhlmann kick good	0	16
4					Bengals	41-yard field goal by Muhlmann	0	19
4					Steelers	Pearson 1-yard touchdown run, Gerela kick good	7	19
"TOP" = time of possession. For other American football terms, see Glossary of American football.							7	19

==== Week 7 at Steelers ====
Cincinnati Bengals (4–2) at Pittsburgh Steelers (5–1)

Quarter	1	2	3	4	Total
Bengals	0	6	0	7	**13**
Steelers	3	7	10	0	**20**

at Three Rivers Stadium • Pittsburgh, Pennsylvania

- Date: October 28
- Game time: 4:00 p.m. EDT
- Game weather: 52 °F (11 °C) • Wind 12 miles per hour (19 km/h; 10 kn)
- Game attendance: 45,761
- Referee: Norm Schachter
- Pro-Football-Reference.com

Game information

Bengals

- Ken Anderson
  20/38, 230 Yds, TD, 3 INT
- Boobie Clark
  15 Rush, 60 Yds
  10 Rec, 68 Yds

Steelers

- Terry Hanratty
  4/7, 127 Yds, TD, INT
- Franco Harris
  21 Rush, 43 Yds
- Ron Shanklin
  3 Rec, 104 Yds, TD

Scoring summary

Quarter	Time	Drive			Team	Scoring information	Score	
Quarter	Time	Plays	Yards	TOP	Team	Scoring information	CIN	PIT
1					Steelers	15-yard field goal by Roy Gerela	0	3
2					Bengals	17-yard field goal by Horst Muhlmann	3	3
2					Bengals	41-yard field goal by Horst Muhlmann	6	3
2					Steelers	Ron Shanklin 51-yard touchdown reception from Terry Hanratty, Roy Gerela kick good	6	10
3					Steelers	18-yard field goal by Roy Gerela	6	13
3					Steelers	John Fuqua 1-yard touchdown run, Roy Gerela kick good	6	20
4					Bengals	Essex Johnson 16-yard touchdown reception from Ken Anderson, Horst Muhlmann kick good	13	20
"TOP" = time of possession. For other American football terms, see Glossary of American football.							13	20

=== Standings ===
AFC Central
	W	L	T	PCT	DIV	CONF	PF	PA	STK
Cincinnati Bengals	10	4	0	.714	4–2	8–3	286	231	W6
Pittsburgh Steelers	10	4	0	.714	4–2	7–4	347	210	W2
Cleveland Browns	7	5	2	.571	4–2	6–3–2	234	255	L2
Houston Oilers	1	13	0	.071	0–6	1–10	199	447	L6

=== Team stats ===
1973 Cincinnati Bengals Team Stats
TEAM STATS	Bengals	Opponents
TOTAL FIRST DOWNS	252	219
Rushing	124	109
Passing	108	97
Penalty	20	13
TOTAL NET YARDS	4512	3705
Avg Per Game	322.3	264.6
Total Plays	871	840
Avg. Per Play	5.2	4.4
NET YARDS RUSHING	2236	1807
Avg. Per Game	159.7	129.1
Total Rushes	515	459
NET YARDS PASSING	2276	1898
Avg. Per Game	162.6	135.6
Sacked Yards Lost	24–163	43–342
Gross Yards	2439	2240
Att. Completions	332–180	338–182
Completion Pct.	54.2	53.8
Intercepted	12	18
PUNTS-AVERAGE	68–41	77–41.7
PENALTIES-YARDS	83–799	78–710
FUMBLES-BALL LOST	25–14	31–16
TOUCHDOWNS	32	27
Rushing	13	15
Passing	18	9
Returns	1	3

Score by Periods	1	2	3	4	Tot
Bengals	39	100	79	68	286
Opponents	50	61	58	62	231

=== Team leaders ===
- Passing: Ken Anderson (329 Att, 179 Comp, 2428 Yds, 54.4 Pct, 18 TD, 12 Int, 81.2 Rating)
- Rushing: Essex Johnson (195 Att, 997 Yds, 5.1 Avg, 46 Long, 4 TD)
- Receiving: Isaac Curtis (45 Rec, 843 Yds, 18.7 Avg, 77 Long, 9 TD)
- Scoring: Horst Muhlmann, 94 points (21 FG; 31 PAT)

== Postseason ==
Round	Date	Opponent	Result	Record	Venue	Attendance
Divisional	December 23	at Miami Dolphins	L 16–34	0–1	Miami Orange Bowl	74,651

== Awards and records ==
- RB Boobie Clark (AFC Rookie of the Year)
- WR Isaac Curtis, Led AFC Rookies, Receiving Yards, 843 yards

=== Pro Bowl selections ===
- WR Isaac Curtis
- DT Mike Reid
- TE Bob Trumpy
