= 1973 Cleveland Browns season =

NFL team season

- Owner: Art Modell
- General manager: Harold Sauerbrei
- Head coach: Nick Skorich
- Home stadium: Cleveland Municipal Stadium

Results
- Record: 7–5–2
- Division place: 3rd AFC Central
- Playoffs: Did not qualify
- Pro Bowlers: RB Greg Pruitt; DT Jerry Sherk; CB Clarence Scott

The 1973 Cleveland Browns season was the team's 24th season with the National Football League. After a solid 1972 season, which included a playoff appearance, the Browns got off to a solid start, winning three of their first four games on the way to a 7-3-1 start. However, the Browns did not win another game the rest of the season and settled for third place with a 7-5-2 record.

To date, the 1973 Browns along with the Kansas City Chiefs, Denver Broncos, and Green Bay Packers are the last teams to record 2 ties in a single season. Overtime for regular season games was introduced the following year, and the occurrence of tie games decreased.

The team did not wear their brown jerseys for any 1973 game, preseason or regular season.

== Offseason ==
=== Draft ===
1973 Cleveland Browns draft
Round	Pick	Player	Position	College	Notes
1	16	Steve Holden	WR	Arizona St	
1	22	Pete Adams	OG	USC	
2	30	Greg Pruitt *	RB	Oklahoma	
2	47	Jim Stienke	DB	Texas St	
3	67	Bob Crum	DE	Arizona	
4	93	Andy Dorris	DE	New Mexico St	
4	100	Randy Mattingly	QB	Evansville	
6	150	Van Green	DB	Shaw	
9	228	Curtis Wester	OG	Texas A&M-Commerce	
10	256	Tommy Humphrey	C	Abilene Christian	
11	281	Carl Barisich	DT	Princeton	
12	306	Stan Simmons	TE	Lewis & Clark	
13	334	Jim Romaniszyn	LB	Edinboro	
14	359	Robert Popelka	DB	SMU	
15	384	Dave Sullivan	WR	Virginia	
16	412	George Greenfield	RB	Murray St	
17	437	Robert McClowry	C	Michigan St	
Made roster † Pro Football Hall of Fame * Made at least one Pro Bowl during career

== Personnel ==
=== Staff / coaches ===
1973 Cleveland Browns staff
Front office: Owner and President – Art Modell; Executive Vice President/General Manager – Harold Sauerbrei; Head coaches: Head Coaches – Nick Skorich; Offensive coaches: Wide Receivers – Fran Polsfoot; Offensive line – Jerry Smith	Defensive coaches: Defensive Coordinator - Howard Brinker; Defensive Line - Dick Modzelewski; Secondary / Defensive Backs – Richie McCabe; Special teams coaches: Special Teams – Al Tabor; Athletic Trainer - Leo Murphy

=== Final roster ===
1973 Cleveland Browns roster
Quarterbacks (QB): 13 Don Horn; 15 Mike Phipps; 17 Brian Sipe; Running backs (RB): 30 Ken Brown; 44 Leroy Kelly; 26 Billy Lefear; 37 Hugh McKinnis; 34 Greg Pruitt; 35 Bo Scott; Wide receivers (WR): 88 Steve Holden; 43 Fair Hooker; 25 Frank Pitts; 42 Gloster Richardson; 48 Dave Sullivan; Tight ends (TE): 83 Chip Glass; 89 Milt Morin; 85 Ken Smith	Offensive linemen (OL): 63 Joe Carollo T; 64 Jim Copeland C/G; 61 Bob DeMarco C; 65 John Demarie G; 73 Doug Dieken T; 66 Gene Hickerson G; 67 Chuck Hutchison G; 78 Bob McKay T; 62 Chris Morris T; Defensive linemen (DL): 74 Carl Barisich DT; 84 Bob Briggs DE; 71 Walter Johnson DT; 80 Joe Jones DE; 81 Nick Roman DE; 72 Jerry Sherk DT; 87 Lester Sims DE	Linebackers (LB): 60 Bob Babich MLB; 50 John Garlington OLB; 53 Mel Long OLB; 59 Charlie Hall OLB; 56 Jim Romaniszyn OLB; Defensive backs (DB): 23 Clifford Brooks CB; 27 Thom Darden FS; 28 Ben Davis CB; 21 Van Green FS; 22 Clarence Scott CB; 20 Jim Stienke CB; 29 Walt Sumner SS; Special teams (ST): 12 Don Cockroft K/P	Reserve: 69 Pete Adams G (IR); 52 Billy Andrews LB (IR); 94 Bob McClowry C; 68 Bubba Pena G (IR); Rookies in italics

== Preseason ==
Week	Date	Opponent	Result	Record	Venue	Attendance
1	August 6	San Francisco 49ers	L 16–27	0–1	Cleveland Municipal Stadium	65,707
2	August 11	at Los Angeles Rams	T 21–21	0–1–1	Los Angeles Memorial Coliseum	54,385
3	August 19	Cincinnati Bengals	W 24–6	1–1–1	Ohio Stadium	73,421
4	August 25	vs. Atlanta Falcons	W 20–17	2–1–1	Neyland Stadium	40,831
5	September 1	Detroit Lions	L 13–16	2–2–1	Cleveland Municipal Stadium	64,088
6	September 8	vs. New York Giants	L 10–21	2–3–1	Rubber Bowl	30,751

== Regular season schedule ==
Week	Date	Opponent	Result	Record	Venue	Attendance	Recap
1	September 16	Baltimore Colts	**W** 24–14	1–0	Cleveland Municipal Stadium	74,303	Recap
2	September 23	at **Pittsburgh Steelers**	**L** 6–33	1–1	Three Rivers Stadium	49,396	Recap
3	September 30	New York Giants	**W** 12–10	2–1	Cleveland Municipal Stadium	76,065	Recap
4	October 7	**Cincinnati Bengals**	**W** 17–10	3–1	Cleveland Browns Stadium	70,805	Recap
5	October 15	Miami Dolphins	**L** 9–17	3–2	Cleveland Municipal Stadium	72,070	Recap
6	October 21	**Houston Oilers**	**W** 42–13	4–2	Cleveland Municipal Stadium	61,146	Recap
7	October 28	San Diego Chargers	**T** 16–16	4–2–1	Cleveland Municipal Stadium	68,244	Recap
8	November 4	at Minnesota Vikings	**L** 3–26	4–3–1	Metropolitan Stadium	45,590	Recap
9	November 11	at **Houston Oilers**	**W** 23–13	5–3–1	Houston Astrodome	37,230	Recap
10	November 18	at Oakland Raiders	**W** 7–3	6–3–1	Oakland–Alameda County Coliseum	47,398	Recap
11	November 25	**Pittsburgh Steelers**	**W** 21–16	7–3–1	Cleveland Municipal Stadium	67,773	Recap
12	December 2	at Kansas City Chiefs	**T** 20–20	7–3–2	Arrowhead Stadium	70,296	Recap
13	December 9	at **Cincinnati Bengals**	**L** 17–34	7–4–2	Riverfront Stadium	58,266	Recap
14	December 16	at Los Angeles Rams	**L** 17–30	7–5–2	Los Angeles Memorial Coliseum	73,948	Recap
Note: Intra-division opponents are in **bold** text.

=== Season summary ===
==== Week 1 ====
Team	1	2	3	4	Total
Colts	0	7	7	0	14
• Browns	7	10	7	0	24

- Date: September 16
- Location: Cleveland Municipal Stadium, Cleveland, Ohio
- Game start: 1:00 p.m. EST
- Game attendance: 74,303
- Game weather: 64 °F (18 °C); wind 9 mph (14 km/h)

Scoring summary
Q1	CLE	Pitts 26 yard pass from Phipps (Cockroft kick)	CLE 7–0
Q2	BAL	Speyrer 33 yard pass from Jones (Hunt kick)	Tie 7–7
Q2	CLE	Cockroft 14 yard field goal	CLE 10–7
Q2	CLE	Scott 45 yard interception return (Cockroft kick)	CLE 17–7
Q3	BAL	Hendricks 2 yard blocked punt return (Hunt kick)	CLE 17–14
Q3	CLE	Pitts 8 yard pass from Phipps (Cockroft kick)	CLE 24–14

==== Week 3 ====
Team	1	2	3	4	Total
Giants	0	10	0	0	10
• Browns	0	0	6	6	12

- Date: September 30
- Location: Cleveland Municipal Stadium
- Game start: 1:00 p.m. EST
- Game attendance: 76,065
- Game weather: 62 °F (17 °C); wind 9 mph (14 km/h)

Scoring summary
Q2	NYG	Gogolak 20 yard field goal	NYG 3–0
Q2	NYG	Tucker 20 yard pass from Snead (Gogolak kick)	NYG 10–0
Q3	CLE	Cockroft 11 yard field goal	NYG 10–3
Q3	CLE	Cockroft 27 yard field goal	NYG 10–6
Q4	CLE	Cockroft 30 yard field goal	NYG 10–9
Q4	CLE	Cockroft 10 yard field goal	CLE 12–10

==== Week 4 ====
Team	1	2	3	4	Total
Bengals	3	0	0	7	10
• Browns	0	7	7	3	17

- Date: October 7
- Location: Cleveland Municipal Stadium
- Game start: 1:00 p.m. EST
- Game attendance: 70,805
- Game weather: 60 °F (16 °C); wind 4 mph (6.4 km/h)

Scoring summary
Q1	CIN	Muhlmann 38 yard field goal	CIN 3–0
Q2	CLE	Kelly 3 yard run (Cockroft kick)	CLE 7–3
Q3	CLE	Kelly 7 yard run (Cockroft kick)	CLE 14–3
Q4	CIN	Curtis 60 yard pass from Anderson (Muhlmann kick)	CLE 14–10
Q4	CLE	Cockroft 24 yard field goal	CLE 17–10

==== Week 6 ====
Team	1	2	3	4	Total
Oilers	0	0	13	0	13
• Browns	14	14	0	14	42

- Date: October 21
- Location: Cleveland Municipal Stadium
- Game start: 1:00 p.m. EST
- Game weather: 51 °F (11 °C); wind 6 mph (9.7 km/h)

Scoring summary
Q1	CLE	Kelly 8 yard run (Cockroft kick)	CLE 7–0
Q1	CLE	Phipps 1 yard run (Cockroft kick)	CLE 14–0
Q2	CLE	Hooker 21 yard pass from Phipps (Cockroft kick)	CLE 21–0
Q2	CLE	Pitts 3 yard pass from Phipps (Cockroft kick)	CLE 28–0
Q3	HOU	Hinton 34 yard pass from Pastorini (Butler kick)	CLE 28–7
Q3	HOU	Butler 9 yard field goal	CLE 28–10
Q3	HOU	Butler 31 yard field goal	CLE 28–13
Q4	CLE	Phipps 13 yard run (Cockroft kick)	CLE 35–13
Q4	CLE	Scott 2 yard pass from Horn (Cockroft kick)	CLE 42–13

==== Week 8 ====
Team	1	2	3	4	Total
Browns	3	0	0	0	3
• Vikings	3	6	7	10	26

- Date: November 4
- Location: Metropolitan Stadium
- Game start: 1:00 p.m. CST
- Game weather: 27 °F (−3 °C); wind 11 mph (18 km/h)

Scoring summary
Q1	CLE	Don Cockroft 27 yard field goal	CLE 3–0
Q1	MIN	Fred Cox 16 yard field goal	Tied 3–3
Q2	MIN	Fred Cox 23 yard field goal	MIN 6–3
Q2	MIN	Fred Cox 33 yard field goal	MIN 9–3
Q3	MIN	Oscar Reed 3 yard rush (Cox kick)	MIN 16–3
Q4	MIN	Stu Voigt 7 yard pass from Fran Tarkenton (Cox kick)	MIN 23–3
Q4	MIN	Fred Cox 41 yard field goal	MIN 26–3

==== Week 9 ====
Team	1	2	3	4	Total
• Browns	17	0	3	3	23
Oilers	0	3	3	7	13

- Date: November 11
- Location: Houston Astrodome
- Game start: 2:00 p.m. EST
- Game weather: Indoors (dome)

Scoring summary
Q1	CLE	Cockroft 30 yard field goal	CLE 3–0
Q1	CLE	Phipps 1 yard run (Cockroft kick)	CLE 10–0
Q1	CLE	Pruitt 53 yard run (Cockroft kick)	CLE 17–0
Q2	HOU	Butler 27 yard field goal	CLE 17–3
Q3	HOU	Butler 46 yard field goal	CLE 17–6
Q3	CLE	Cockroft 22 yard field goal	CLE 20–6
Q4	CLE	Cockroft 45 yard field goal	CLE 23–6
Q4	HOU	Alston 39 yard pass from Dickey (Butler kick)	CLE 23–13

==== Week 10 ====
Team	1	2	3	4	Total
• Browns	0	7	0	0	7
Raiders	0	0	0	3	3

- Date: November 18
- Location: Oakland–Alameda County Coliseum
- Game start: 4:00 p.m. EST
- Game weather: 53 °F (12 °C); wind 18 mph (29 km/h)

Scoring summary
Q2	CLE	Hooker 7 yard pass from Phipps (Cockroft kick)	CLE 7–0
Q4	OAK	Blanda 23 yard field goal	CLE 7–3

==== Week 11 ====
Team	1	2	3	4	Total
Steelers	7	3	3	3	16
• Browns	7	7	0	7	21

- Date: November 25
- Location: Cleveland Municipal Stadium
- Game start: 1:00 p.m. EST
- Game weather: 50 °F (10 °C); wind 15 mph (24 km/h)

Scoring summary
Q1	PIT	Shanklin 9 yard pass from Gilliam (Gerela kick)	PIT 7–0
Q1	CLE	Phipps 1 yard run (Cockroft kick)	Tie 7–7
Q2	CLE	Pruitt 15 yard pass from Phipps (Cockroft kick)	CLE 14–7
Q2	PIT	Gerela 24 yard field goal	CLE 14–10
Q3	PIT	Gerela 14 yard field goal	CLE 14–13
Q4	PIT	Gerela 20 yard field goal	PIT 16–14
Q4	CLE	Pruitt 19 yard run (Cockroft kick)	CLE 21–16

=== Standings ===
AFC Central
	W	L	T	PCT	DIV	CONF	PF	PA	STK
Cincinnati Bengals	10	4	0	.714	4–2	8–3	286	231	W6
Pittsburgh Steelers	10	4	0	.714	4–2	7–4	347	210	W2
Cleveland Browns	7	5	2	.571	4–2	6–3–2	234	255	L2
Houston Oilers	1	13	0	.071	0–6	1–10	199	447	L6
