= Chip Myers =

American football player (1945–1999)

No. 46, 25
- Position: Wide receiver

Personal information
- Born: July 9, 1945; Panama City, Florida, U.S.
- Died: February 23, 1999 (aged 53); Long Lake, Minnesota, U.S.
- Listed height: 6 ft 4 in (1.93 m)
- Listed weight: 203 lb (92 kg)

Career information
- High school: C.E. Donart (Stillwater, Oklahoma)
- College: Northwestern Oklahoma State
- NFL draft: 1967: 10th round, 248th overall pick

Career history

Playing
- San Francisco 49ers (1967); Cincinnati Bengals (1969–1976)

Coaching
- Tampa Bay Buccaneers (1983–1984) Wide receivers coach; Indianapolis Colts (1985–1988) Wide receivers coach; New York Jets (1990–1993) Wide receivers coach; New Orleans Saints (1994) Offensive assistant coach; Minnesota Vikings (1995–1997) Wide receivers coach; Minnesota Vikings (1998) Quarterbacks coach

Awards and highlights
- Pro Bowl (1972)

Career NFL/AFL statistics
- Receptions: 220
- Receiving yards: 3,092
- Receiving touchdowns: 12
- Stats at Pro Football Reference

Phillip Leon "Chip" Myers (July 9, 1945 – February 23, 1999) was an American professional football player who was a wide receiver who in the National Football League (NFL) for the Cincinnati Bengals and San Francisco 49ers. He played college football for the Northwestern Oklahoma State Rangers

== Early life ==
Myers attended Northwestern Oklahoma State University in Alva, Oklahoma.

== Playing career ==
Myers was selected in the 10th round (248th overall) of the 1967 NFL/AFL draft. The wide receiver saw little action in 12 games, with two receptions for 13 yards.

During the 1968 season, he played minor league football with the (Huntsville) Alabama Hawks of the Continental Football League, where he averaged almost 22 yards per catch.

In 1969, he signed with the American Football League Cincinnati Bengals. In his first year with the team, he played in all 14 games, starting five at wide receiver. He had 10 receptions for 205 yards (a 20.5 average) and two touchdowns.

In 1970, he became an integral part of the now-NFL's Bengals offense and quarterback Virgil Carter. In 14 games, he started eight and totaled a team-leading 32 receptions for 542 yards (a 16.9 average) and two touchdowns.

The following year, 1971, he was hampered by injuries and played 10 games, starting seven, and had 27 receptions for 286 yards (a 10.6 average) and one touchdown.

He bounced back in 1972 with his best-ever season. With Ken Anderson now the Bengals starting quarterback, Myers started all 14 games with a team-leading 57 receptions for 792 yards (a 13.9 average) and three touchdowns. He ranked third in the NFL in total receptions and seventh in receiving yards. His performance earned him a spot on the 1972 Pro Bowl squad.

However, in 1973 he was again beset by injuries, playing only five games and starting four. He had seven receptions for 77 yards (an 11.0 average).

In 1974, he bounced back again and fellow wide receivers Isaac Curtis and Charlie Joiner, tight end Bob Trumpy, Myers and quarterback Anderson gave the Bengals one of the best passing attacks in the NFL. Playing all 14 games and starting three, he had a team-leading 32 receptions for 383 yards (a 12.0 average) and one touchdown.

In 1975, Myers played in 13 games, starting two, with 36 receptions for 527 yards (a 14.6 average) and three touchdowns.

The 1976 season would be his last. He played in 12 games, starting four, with 17 receptions for 267 yards (a 15.7 average) and one touchdown. During that final season he caught the longest pass of his career, a 63-yarder from Anderson

== NFL/AFL career statistics ==
Legend
**Bold**	Career high

=== Regular season ===
Year	Team	Games		Receiving				
Year	Team	GP	GS	Rec	Yds	Avg	Lng	TD
1967	SFO	12	0	2	13	6.5	8	0
1969	CIN	14	2	10	205	**20.5**	50	2
1970	CIN	14	8	32	542	16.9	56	1
1971	CIN	10	7	27	286	10.6	20	1
1972	CIN	14	14	**57**	**792**	13.9	42	**3**
1973	CIN	5	4	7	77	11.0	18	0
1974	CIN	14	3	32	383	12.0	22	1
1975	CIN	13	2	36	527	14.6	34	**3**
1976	CIN	12	3	17	267	15.7	**63**	1
		108	43	220	3,092	14.1	63	12

=== Playoffs ===
Year	Team	Games		Receiving				
Year	Team	GP	GS	Rec	Yds	Avg	Lng	TD
1970	CIN	1	1	**4**	66	16.5	29	0
1975	CIN	1	0	3	**67**	**22.3**	**37**	0
		2	1	7	133	19.0	37	0

== Coaching career ==
Myers served as an assistant coach with the Minnesota Vikings for four seasons coaching receivers 1995-97 and quarterbacks in 1998. In January 1999 he was promoted to the team's offensive coordinator when Brian Billick left to become head coach of the Baltimore Ravens. In February, Myers had spent a week in Hawaii with the rest of the Vikings coaches for the Pro Bowl, and had been with the staff in Indianapolis on the weekend of February 20 for the NFL scouting combine.

However, he died suddenly at age 53 of a heart attack February 23, 1999 at his home in Long Lake, Minnesota. He was survived by his wife, Susie, and five adult children.

Myers received much credit for the development of quarterback Randall Cunningham, who said, ""He was a big part of my success, and I'll carry the teachings and things I've learned from him onto the field each game." "I don't think there was anybody in this building who was loved more than he was," said defensive coordinator Foge Fazio, who worked with Myers seven of the last eight season with the New York Jets and Vikings.

== See also ==
- Other American Football League players
