= Essex Johnson =

American football player (1946–2020)

Essex L. Johnson
No. 19
- Position: Running back

Personal information
- Born: October 15, 1946; Shreveport, Louisiana, U.S.
- Died: October 29, 2020 (aged 74)
- Listed height: 5 ft 9 in (1.75 m)
- Listed weight: 201 lb (91 kg)

Career information
- High school: Shreveport
- College: Grambling State
- NFL draft: 1968: 6th round, 156th overall pick

Career history
- Cincinnati Bengals (1968–1975); Tampa Bay Buccaneers (1976)

Career NFL/AFL statistics
- Rushing yards: 3,236
- Rushing average: 4.5
- Receptions: 146
- Receiving yards: 1,742
- Total touchdowns: 31
- Stats at Pro Football Reference

Essex L. Johnson (October 15, 1946 – October 29, 2020) was a professional American football running back for eight seasons for the Cincinnati Bengals and one season for the Tampa Bay Buccaneers.

== Early life ==
Johnson was born on October 15, 1946, in Shreveport, Louisiana. He attended Booker T. Washington High School where he played running back, kick returner and punt returner on the football team. His high school coach Leonard Barnes taught Johnson the running style he would take into college and professional football. In 1963, Johnson scored a then school record 23 touchdowns, and the team's only defeat was a 13–12 loss to the state champions. He also ran track on the 440-yard and 880-yard relay teams.

== College career ==
Johnson played defensive back and offensive halfback at Grambling State University for legendary coach Eddie Robinson. In October 1966, he returned a punt 65 yards for a touchdown, which was marked by his dazzling maneuvers down the field. One week later, he returned a kickoff 95 yards for a touchdown. By his final season in 1967 he had helped lead the team to three consecutive Southwestern Athletic Conference (SWAC) titles. He scored two touchdowns in Grambling's 1967 Orange Blossom Classic win over Florida A&M.

Among his Grambling teammates was future Hall of fame receiver Charlie Joiner. In 2012, Johnson was inducted into the Grambling Legends Sports Hall of Fame.

== Professional career ==
=== Early years ===
Johnson was drafted in the 6th round (156th overall) of the 1968 Common draft by the expansion Cincinnati Bengals, the team's first draft. Although he was drafted as a defensive back, he was converted to halfback once in the NFL.

In his rookie year of 1968, the Bengals' first season in the American Football League, he played in all 14 games, primarily as a backup to running backs Paul Robinson (American football) and Jess Phillips. He scored his first professional touchdown in the Bengals' first-ever win (in their second game). In the fourth quarter, he had a 35-yard touchdown run through the middle as the Bengals downed the Denver Broncos, 24-10.

For the season, Johnson rushed for 178 yards on only 26 attempts (a 6.8 average) and three touchdowns, plus one reception for 33 yards. He also returned 22 punts for 122 yards (a 5.0 average), and returned 14 kicks for 266 yards (a 19.0 average).

In 1969, he played in 12 games and rushed for 54 yards in 15 attempts (a 3.6 average), while catching one pass for three yards. He returned 17 punts for 85 yards (a 5.0 average), and he returned 16 kicks for 362 yards, a 22.6 average.

In 1970, as the Bengals entered the NFL, his playing time increased. He rushed for 273 yards on 65 attempts (a 4.2 average) with two touchdowns, with 15 receptions for 190 yards (a 12.7 average) and two touchdowns. He returned seven punts for 72 yards (a 10.3 average) and three kicks for 68 yards, a 22.7 average.

In 1971, his carries again increased as he rushed for 522 yards in 85 attempts (a 6.1 average) and four touchdowns. His carries included an NFL season-long 86-yard run against the Cleveland Browns. He caught 14 passes for 258 yards (an 18.4 average) and two touchdowns. He returned only three kicks and two punts.

=== Breakout seasons ===
In 1972, Johnson earned his nickname "The Essex Express" as he had a breakout year as the Bengals' featured running back, starting 11 games. He gained 825 yards in 212 attempts (a 3.9 average) and four touchdowns. He caught a career-best 29 passes for 420 yards (a 14.5 average) and two touchdowns.

In 1973, he started all 14 games and finished just shy of the 1,000-yard mark with a career-best 997 yards in 195 attempts (a 5.1 average) and four touchdowns. He added 28 receptions (including a career-long 78-yard catch) for 356 yards (a 12.7 average) and three touchdowns. He actually reached 1,000 yards, but fell below the benchmark because of penalties and a negative rushing play.

In a September 30, 1973 game against the San Diego Chargers, he had 121 rushing yards in 21 attempts and 116 yards receiving, with two touchdown catches (78 and 38 yards). After the game, future hall of fame defensive end Deacon Jones said only O.J. Simpson was a better running back in the league. This was also the game in which football legend Johnny Unitas threw his last touchdown pass.

=== Later career ===
In 1974, beset by a knee injury, Johnson played in only five games, with 44 yards in 19 attempts (a 2.3 average) and eight receptions for 85 yards (a 10.6 average) and one touchdown.

In 1975, after undergoing his second knee surgery in an 18-month span, he bounced back and played in all 14 games, starting one, gaining 177 yards on 58 attempts (a 3.1 average) with one touchdown, along with 25 receptions for 196 yards (a 7.8 average) and one touchdown.

After eight seasons with the Bengals, during training camp prior to the 1976 season, the Bengals waived their career rushing leader on July 14, 1975, due to concerns about his knee.

Johnson was selected by the Buccaneers in the 1976 NFL expansion draft. For the Bucs, he played in all 14 games, starting one, and gained 166 yards in 47 attempts (a 3.5 average) and one touchdown, with 25 receptions for 201 yards (a 14.4 average) and one touchdown.

He was waived by the Bucs on February 25, 1977, ending his nine-year pro career.

== NFL/AFL career statistics ==
Legend
	Led the league
**Bold**	Career high

=== Regular season ===
Year	Team	Games		Rushing					Receiving				
Year	Team	GP	GS	Att	Yds	Avg	Lng	TD	Rec	Yds	Avg	Lng	TD
1968	CIN	14	0	26	178	**6.8**	41	3	1	33	**33.0**	33	0
1969	CIN	12	0	15	54	3.6	13	0	1	3	3.0	3	0
1970	CIN	13	0	65	273	4.2	26	2	15	190	12.7	51	2
1971	CIN	14	0	85	522	6.1	**86**	**4**	14	258	18.4	67	2
1972	CIN	14	11	**212**	825	3.9	19	**4**	**29**	**420**	14.5	65	2
1973	CIN	14	14	195	**997**	5.1	46	**4**	28	356	12.7	**78**	**3**
1974	CIN	5	2	19	44	2.3	11	0	8	85	10.6	27	1
1975	CIN	12	4	58	177	3.1	15	1	25	196	7.8	30	1
1976	TAM	14	1	47	166	3.5	27	1	25	201	8.0	38	1
		112	32	722	3,236	4.5	86	19	146	1,742	11.9	78	12

=== Playoffs ===
Year	Team	Games		Rushing					Receiving				
Year	Team	GP	GS	Att	Yds	Avg	Lng	TD	Rec	Yds	Avg	Lng	TD
1970	CIN	1	0	2	0	0.0	0	0	**1**	**6**	**6.0**	**6**	0
1973	CIN	1	1	2	**17**	**8.5**	**14**	0	0	0	0.0	0	0
1975	CIN	1	0	**3**	0	0.0	0	0	0	0	0.0	0	0
		3	1	7	17	2.4	14	0	1	6	6.0	6	0

== Personal life ==
His son, Essex Johnson, was a star defensive end at Verbum Dei High School in Los Angeles where, as a junior, he recorded 96 tackles and eight sacks. During his senior season, he totaled 53 tackles playing defense, and on offense he rushed for 67 yards on 19 carries and caught eight passes for 107 yards. He also ran track and played basketball.

== Death ==
Essex Johnson died on the morning of October 29, 2020.

== See also ==
- List of American Football League players
