= AFC North =

Division of the American Football Conference

- Conference: American Football Conference
- League: National Football League
- Sport: American football
- Founded: 1970 (as AFC Central Division)
- No. of teams: 4
- Country: United States
- Most recent champion: Pittsburgh Steelers (25th title) (2025)
- Most titles: Pittsburgh Steelers (25 titles)

AFC North Teams Location

The American Football Conference – Northern Division or AFC North is one of the four divisions of the American Football Conference (AFC) in the National Football League (NFL). The division was created after the NFL realigned its divisions upon expanding to 32 teams, with the 2002 NFL season marking the league's first season following this restructuring. The division consists of the Baltimore Ravens, Cincinnati Bengals, Cleveland Browns, and Pittsburgh Steelers. Prior to this realignment, these teams were members of the AFC Central Division, along with the Tennessee Titans and Jacksonville Jaguars.

This is the only division in the NFL in which no member team has hosted a Super Bowl in their stadiums. The division, however, has won eight Super Bowl titles (six for Pittsburgh, two for Baltimore) in total. The AFC North has the geographically closest teams of any NFL division.

== Formation ==
The AFC North currently has four members: Baltimore Ravens, Cincinnati Bengals, Cleveland Browns, and Pittsburgh Steelers. The original four members of the AFC Central were the Browns, Bengals, Steelers and Houston Oilers (now the Tennessee Titans).

The AFC North is the only AFC division that does not contain a charter team from the original American Football League. However, the Cincinnati Bengals were an AFL expansion team in the 1968 AFL season (the Steelers and Browns joined the AFC in 1970), although the Bengals joining the AFL was contingent on the team joining the NFL after the AFL–NFL merger was finalized in 1970, as Paul Brown was not a supporter of the AFL.

The AFC North contains all three of the pre-merger NFL cities (Baltimore, Cleveland and Pittsburgh) whose then-franchises joined the AFC in 1970. Three of the teams also have interlocked histories. Both the Bengals and the Browns were founded by Paul Brown, while the Ravens and the city of Cleveland have their own unique relationship. Only the Steelers, the oldest franchise in the division, have no direct history involving Paul Brown.

== History ==
=== 1970s ===
The AFC Central division was formed when the Browns and Steelers brought their rivalry from the NFL Century Division to the AFC in 1970, joining the newly formed "AFC Central" with the Houston Oilers (from the AFL's East Division) and Cincinnati Bengals (from the AFL's West Division).

Although the Bengals won the first AFC Central Division Championship in 1970, the Steelers dominated the division for most of the 1970s. The Steelers also would win four Super Bowls in the decade, which were also the team's first league titles.

=== 1980s ===
The 1980 Cleveland Browns broke the Steelers' six-year run as division champions, but failed to advance past the divisional round of the playoffs, losing to the Oakland Raiders as a result of Red Right 88. The Bengals were the only team to represent the AFC Central in the Super Bowl during the decade, appearing in Super Bowls XVI in the 1981 season and XXIII in the 1988 season. Both appearances resulted in close losses to the San Francisco 49ers.

=== 1990s ===
The Steelers returned as the dominant team in the division in 1992. They won five divisional titles in six years, and played in Super Bowl XXX, in which they lost to the Dallas Cowboys.

In 1992, the Oilers were involved in one of the most famous playoff games in NFL history. In a game now known as The Comeback, the Oilers surrendered a 32-point lead to the Buffalo Bills and lost in overtime, 41–38. It was the largest deficit ever overcome in the history of the NFL for nearly 30 years.

In 1995, the Jacksonville Jaguars joined the league through expansion and were placed in the AFC Central. It was the first change to the structure of the division since its inception and added a second team to the division from the U.S. South. In 1996, in one of the most controversial decisions in American sports history, the Cleveland Browns moved to Baltimore and were rechristened as the Baltimore Ravens. Then in 1997, the Oilers moved to Tennessee but remained in the division (the team later was renamed the Titans in 1999). The makeup of the AFC Central changed once again in 1999 when the NFL reactivated the Cleveland Browns. The division had six teams for the 1999 to 2001 seasons, and was the only division to have that many teams in the post-merger era.

Aside from Pittsburgh's appearance in Super Bowl XXX, the only other appearance in the Super Bowl for the division in the decade was the Titans in Super Bowl XXXIV, who came up one yard short of the first Super Bowl to go into overtime. Along the way, the team got revenge on the Bills seven years after the comeback in the wild-card round by defeating the Bills 22–16 as a result of the Music City Miracle.

=== 2000s ===
The decade began with the Baltimore Ravens winning the division and Super Bowl XXXV. The team's defense, led by linebacker Ray Lewis, was arguably one of the best defenses of all time.

The Pittsburgh Steelers won the AFC Central in 2001.

In 2002, the NFL realigned into eight divisions of four teams. The Jaguars and Titans—the latter winning the AFC Central title in 2000—were both moved to the new AFC South, while the rest of the AFC Central remained intact and was renamed the AFC North. The Bengals, Browns, and Steelers were guaranteed to remain in a division together in any circumstance; this was part of the NFL's settlement with the city of Cleveland in the wake of the 1995 Cleveland Browns relocation controversy. The division, geographically speaking, thus became the shortest driving distance between each team among the NFL's eight divisions, as three of the teams are located within close proximity of Interstate 70 (with the one city that is not, Cleveland, being two hours north of I-70), and the distance between Baltimore and Cincinnati (the two teams furthest away from each other) being only 526 miles (847 km) apart. The Browns and Steelers, the two closest rivals, even ride a bus to their games instead of flying.

Since realignment, the Steelers have won the division title nine times, the Ravens have won the division eight times, the Bengals have each won four times. The Steelers have swept all divisional opponents twice, in 2002 and 2008 (going 7 for 7 both times, winning against the Browns in a 2002 AFC Wildcard game and the Ravens in the 2008 AFC Championship), and the Ravens and Bengals have swept all three divisional opponents once each, the Bengals in 2009 and Ravens in 2011.

Since divisional realignment, the Steelers have made the playoffs ten times, the Ravens eight times, the Bengals six times, and the Browns have not won a division title.

In 2005, although finishing second in the division to the Bengals, the Steelers became the first team in NFL history to enter the playoffs as a #6 seeded wild card team and win the Super Bowl.

In 2008, the Steelers became the first team to repeat as division champion since the division's realignment in 2002. The team went on to win Super Bowl XLIII that season, their second Super Bowl in four years and an NFL-record sixth overall.

In 2009, the Cincinnati Bengals swept their annual six-game slate of divisional opponents. Their first three games against the AFC North came in weeks three-through-five when they beat the Steelers, Browns and Ravens, respectively, each by three points. The close finishes deemed the Bengals, "Cardiac Cats". Cincinnati clinched their first division title since 2005 in a week 16 victory over the Kansas City Chiefs, 17–10. In the playoffs, however, the Bengals fell to the New York Jets at home, 24–14.

Baltimore finished off their season by winning three of their final four games to finish 9-7 and earn the number-six seed in the AFC Playoffs. In the first round of the postseason, Baltimore defeated the New England Patriots in Foxboro, 33–14. In the divisional round of the postseason, Baltimore's season came to an end with a 20–3 loss to the Indianapolis Colts, who would defeat the Jets one week later to win the conference.

=== 2010s ===
The Ravens repeated as division champions in 2011 and 2012. The team went on to win Super Bowl XLVII over the San Francisco 49ers, on February 3, 2013, in New Orleans. It was the second franchise Super Bowl win. As of 2012, the Steelers are the AFC North's most successful team with a 599–547–21 record all-time with the Browns 2nd in line with an overall record of 510–441–while the Ravens sit in 3rd (even though they were not an official franchise until 1996) at 164–128–and then the Bengals today remain the only team in the division with their all-time record below .500 as they sit in last at 310–396–.

In 2015, the Bengals became the first team in the AFC North (Central) to ever start the year 8–0, finishing the season 12–4 and winning the division for the second time in three years. Cincinnati clinched the division title in week 16 when the Steelers were upset by the 4–10 Ravens in Baltimore, quarterbacked by Ryan Mallett. Bengals' quarterback Andy Dalton was having his best season of his five-year career until breaking his thumb on December 13 against Pittsburgh caused him to miss the rest of the season. In the playoffs, Cincinnati (quarterbacked by A. J. McCarron) lost in a rematch with the Steelers, 18–16, in the final minutes of a heated battle. Pittsburgh advanced to the divisional round of the playoffs, only to lose to Peyton Manning and the eventual Super Bowl Champion Denver Broncos.

The Steelers won the division title in 2016 after a 31–27 win over the Ravens on Christmas Day. Despite victories in the playoffs against Miami and Kansas City, they fell to New England in the AFC Championship Game.

One particularly notable game in the 2017 occurred in a Week 13 Monday Night Football matchup between the Bengals and the Steelers. During the game, the Bengals took a 17–0 lead, but the Steelers outscored them 23–3 the rest of the game for 23–20 win. The game was a brutal affair with serious injuries to Shazier, Mixon and Burfict and subsequent suspensions to JuJu Smith-Schuster and George Iloka (with Iloka's later being overturned). The two teams clocked up four penalties for unnecessary roughness, one for unsportsmanlike conduct, one for roughing the passer and another for taunting. The Bengals themselves clocked up 13 penalties for 173 yards. When asked about the viciousness and the brutality of the game, Roethlisberger responded that it was "AFC North football".

The Ravens clinched the division in Week 15 of 2019 in a 42–21 win over the NY Jets. However, they were upset by the Tennessee Titans at home in the second round as the Number 1 seed.

=== 2020s ===
The Steelers won the division in 2020. The Ravens and Browns also made it into the playoffs as the 5th and 6th seeded wildcards respectively. For the Browns, it was their first playoff appearance since 2002. The Browns defeated the Steelers 48–37 in Pittsburgh for the wild-card round, marking their first playoff win since 1994. The Ravens beat the Titans 20–13 in their Wild Card matchup. However, both the Ravens and Browns failed to win their Divisional Round matchups, losing 17–3 to the Bills and 22–17 to the Chiefs respectively.

The Bengals won the division in 2021. The Steelers were given a shocking last minute invite to the NFL Playoffs, but their journey fell short with a loss to the Kansas City Chiefs in the wild card round. The Bengals beat the Raiders at home 26–19 in the Wild Card matchup, marking their first playoff win since 1990. They then beat the Titans 19–16 in Tennessee, and the Chiefs 27–24 in Kansas City to make it to the Super Bowl. Their season ended with a 23–20 loss in Super Bowl LVI to the Rams.

The Cincinnati Bengals won the division for the second consecutive time in 2022. The 11–4 Bengals faced up against the 12–3 Buffalo Bills on January 2, 2023, however, Bills safety Damar Hamlin collapsed after a tackle on Tee Higgins. The game was suspended after the play. Days later, NFL commissioner Roger Goodell cancelled the game. By win percentage, the Bengals won the North again. After a victory against the Atlanta Falcons, the Baltimore Ravens clinched their playoff spot as well. On January 15, 2023, in the Super Wild Card Weekend, the #3 ranked Bengals played at home against the #6 Ravens. Bengals defeated Ravens by a score of 24–17 with the most notable play by Tyler Huntley failing a Quarterback Sneak at the Bengals 2-yard line. Huntley did not secure the football as Logan Wilson stripped and Huntley fumbled the ball and Sam Hubbard recovered the ball, running a 98-yard Scoop and Score to defeat the Ravens. This play was the longest fumble return touchdown in NFL playoff history. On January 22, the Bengals and the Bills rematched at the Bills' home stadium, Highmark Stadium. Despite the home field advantage and heavy snow conditions, the Bengals were able to upset the Bills, with a score of 27–10 after Bills quarterback Josh Allen was intercepted on the team's final offensive play by Cam Taylor-Britt. The Bengals then advanced to face against the Kansas City Chiefs for the AFC Championship for the second consecutive time. The Bengals would lose this time after a costly penalty allowed the Chiefs to hit a game winning field goal. This was the first ever back-to-back championship appearance in Bengals' history.

The Baltimore Ravens won the division in 2023, as well as the #1 seed in the AFC. All 4 teams in the AFC North finished the 2023 regular season with winning records. 2023 marked the first time since 1935 that each team within an entire division finished the regular season with a winning record. The Steelers became the first team in AFC and AFC North history to post 20 consecutive non-losing records.

Baltimore won the division in 2024, with the Steelers also clinching a wildcard spot in the 2024–25 NFL playoffs.

In 2025, the division came down to a Week 18 matchup between the 9–7 Steelers and the 8–8 Ravens in Pittsburgh. The Steelers narrowly won, 26–24, clinching their first division title since 2020 and eliminating the Ravens from playoff contention.

== Results ==
=== Team success ===
Team success
Team	Years in division	Playoff berths	Division championships	AFC Championship Game appearances	Super Bowl appearances	Super Bowl wins	Refs
Cincinnati Bengals	1970–present	16	11	4	3	0	
Pittsburgh Steelers	1970–present	35	25	16	8	6	
Cleveland Browns	1970–1995, 1999–present	13	6	3	0	0	
Baltimore Ravens	1996–present	16	8	5	2	2	
Houston Oilers/Tennessee Titans	1970–2001	12	3	3	1	0	
Jacksonville Jaguars	1995–2001	4	2	2	0	0	

=== Season-by-season ===
Table legend
Super Bowl champions ‡	Conference champions ^{*}	Division champions ^{^}	Wild card berth ^{#}

AFC North yearly standings and team records
Season	Team (record)						Notes	Refs
Season	1st	2nd	3rd	4th	5th	6th	Notes	Refs
AFC Central Division
1970	Cincinnati (8–6) ^{^}	Cleveland (7–7)	Pittsburgh (5–9)	Houston (3–10–1)			The AFC Central was formed with four inaugural members. The Houston Oilers joined from the AFL Eastern Division, the Cincinnati Bengals joined from the AFL Western Division, and the Cleveland Browns and Pittsburgh Steelers joined from the Century Division.	
1971	Cleveland (9–5) ^{^}	Pittsburgh (6–8)	Houston (4–9–1)	Cincinnati (4–10)				
1972	Pittsburgh (11–3) ^{^}	Cleveland (10–4) ^{#}	Cincinnati (8–6)	Houston (1–13)				
1973	Cincinnati (10–4) ^{^}	Pittsburgh (10–4) ^{#}	Cleveland (7–5–2)	Houston (1–13)				
1974	Pittsburgh (10–3–1) ‡	Houston (7–7)	Cincinnati (7–7)	Cleveland (4–10)				
1975	Pittsburgh (12–2) ‡	Cincinnati (11–3) ^{#}	Houston (10–4)	Cleveland (3–11)				
1976	Pittsburgh (10–4) ^{^}	Cincinnati (10–4)	Cleveland (9–5)	Houston (5–9)				
1977	Pittsburgh (9–5) ^{^}	Cincinnati (8–6)	Houston (8–6)	Cleveland (6–8)				
1978	Pittsburgh (14–2) ‡	Houston (10–6) ^{#}	Cleveland (8–8)	Cincinnati (4–12)				
1979	Pittsburgh (12–4) ‡	Houston (11–5) ^{#}	Cleveland (9–7)	Cincinnati (4–12)				
1980	Cleveland (11–5) ^{^}	Houston (11–5) ^{#}	Pittsburgh (9–7)	Cincinnati (6–10)				
1981	Cincinnati (12–4) ^{*}	Pittsburgh (8–8)	Houston (7–9)	Cleveland (5–11)				
1982	Cincinnati (7–2) ^{#}	Pittsburgh (6–3) ^{#}	Cleveland (4–5) ^{#}	Houston (1–8)			The NFL season was shortened to nine games by a strike, with divisions temporarily suspended and standings based on conference alone.	
1983	Pittsburgh (10–6) ^{^}	Cleveland (9–7)	Cincinnati (7–9)	Houston (2–14)				
1984	Pittsburgh (9–7) ^{^}	Cincinnati (8–8)	Cleveland (5–11)	Houston (3–13)				
1985	Cleveland (8–8) ^{^}	Cincinnati (7–9)	Pittsburgh (7–9)	Houston (5–11)				
1986	Cleveland (12–4) ^{^}	Cincinnati (10–6)	Pittsburgh (6–10)	Houston (5–11)				
1987	Cleveland (10–5) ^{^}	Houston (9–6) ^{#}	Pittsburgh (8–7)	Cincinnati (4–11)			The strike of 1987 reduced the regular season from 16 to 15 games.	
1988	Cincinnati (12–4) ^{*}	Cleveland (10–6) ^{#}	Houston (10–6) ^{#}	Pittsburgh (5–11)				
1989	Cleveland (9–6–1) ^{^}	Houston (9–7) ^{#}	Pittsburgh (9–7) ^{#}	Cincinnati (8–8)				
1990	Cincinnati (9–7) ^{^}	Houston (9–7) ^{#}	Pittsburgh (9–7)	Cleveland (3–13)				
1991	Houston (11–5) ^{^}	Pittsburgh (7–9)	Cleveland (6–10)	Cincinnati (3–13)				
1992	Pittsburgh (11–5) ^{^}	Houston (10–6) ^{#}	Cleveland (7–9)	Cincinnati (5–11)				
1993	Houston (12–4) ^{^}	Pittsburgh (9–7) ^{#}	Cleveland (7–9)	Cincinnati (3–13)				
1994	Pittsburgh (12–4) ^{^}	Cleveland (11–5) ^{#}	Cincinnati (3–13)	Houston (2–14)				
1995	Pittsburgh (11–5) ^{*}	Houston (7–9)	Cincinnati (7–9)	Cleveland (5–11)	Jacksonville (4–12)		An expansion team, the Jacksonville Jaguars, joined the division.	
1996	Pittsburgh (10–6) ^{^}	Jacksonville (9–7) ^{#}	Cincinnati (8–8)	Houston (8–8)	Baltimore (4–12)		The Cleveland Browns moved to Baltimore and became the Baltimore Ravens. Their history and records as the Browns remained in Cleveland for a potential expansion team to acquire.	
1997	Pittsburgh (11–5) ^{^}	Jacksonville (11–5) ^{#}	Tennessee (8–8)	Cincinnati (7–9)	Baltimore (6–9–1)		The Houston Oilers relocated to become the Tennessee Oilers.	
1998	Jacksonville (11–5) ^{^}	Tennessee (8–8)	Pittsburgh (7–9)	Baltimore (6–10)	Cincinnati (3–13)			
1999	Jacksonville (14–2) ^{^}	Tennessee (13–3) ^{*}	Baltimore (8–8)	Pittsburgh (6–10)	Cincinnati (4–12)	Cleveland (2–14)	The Cleveland Browns rejoined the AFC Central as an expansion team after being inactive for three seasons, regaining the history and records of the original Browns. In addition, the Tennessee Oilers rebranded as the Tennessee Titans.	
2000	Tennessee (13–3) ^{^}	Baltimore (12–4) ‡	Pittsburgh (9–7)	Jacksonville (7–9)	Cincinnati (4–12)	Cleveland (3–13)		
2001	Pittsburgh (13–3) ^{^}	Baltimore (10–6) ^{#}	Cleveland (7–9)	Tennessee (7–9)	Jacksonville (6–10)	Cincinnati (6–10)		
AFC North Division
2002	Pittsburgh (10–5–1) ^{^}	Cleveland (9–7) ^{#}	Baltimore (7–9)	Cincinnati (2–14)			The NFL realigned to create four divisions in both conferences with four teams in each division, with the AFC Central being renamed the AFC North. The Jacksonville Jaguars and Tennessee Titans both moved to the newly formed AFC South.	
2003	Baltimore (10–6) ^{^}	Cincinnati (8–8)	Pittsburgh (6–10)	Cleveland (5–11)				
2004	Pittsburgh (15–1) ^{^}	Baltimore (9–7)	Cincinnati (8–8)	Cleveland (4–12)				
2005	Cincinnati (11–5) ^{^}	Pittsburgh (11–5) ‡	Baltimore (6–10)	Cleveland (6–10)				
2006	Baltimore (13–3) ^{^}	Cincinnati (8–8)	Pittsburgh (8–8)	Cleveland (4–12)				
2007	Pittsburgh (10–6) ^{^}	Cleveland (10–6)	Cincinnati (7–9)	Baltimore (5–11)				
2008	Pittsburgh (12–4) ‡	Baltimore (11–5) ^{#}	Cincinnati (4–11–1)	Cleveland (4–12)				
2009	Cincinnati (10–6) ^{^}	Baltimore (9–7) ^{#}	Pittsburgh (9–7)	Cleveland (5–11)				
2010	Pittsburgh (12–4) ^{*}	Baltimore (12–4) ^{#}	Cleveland (5–11)	Cincinnati (4–12)				
2011	Baltimore (12–4) ^{^}	Pittsburgh (12–4) ^{#}	Cincinnati (9–7) ^{#}	Cleveland (4–12)				
2012	Baltimore (10–6) ‡	Cincinnati (10–6) ^{#}	Pittsburgh (8–8)	Cleveland (5–11)				
2013	Cincinnati (11–5) ^{^}	Pittsburgh (8–8)	Baltimore (8–8)	Cleveland (4–12)				
2014	Pittsburgh (11–5) ^{^}	Cincinnati (10–5–1) ^{#}	Baltimore (10–6) ^{#}	Cleveland (7–9)				
2015	Cincinnati (12–4) ^{^}	Pittsburgh (10–6) ^{#}	Baltimore (5–11)	Cleveland (3–13)				
2016	Pittsburgh (11–5) ^{^}	Baltimore (8–8)	Cincinnati (6–9–1)	Cleveland (1–15)				
2017	Pittsburgh (13–3) ^{^}	Baltimore (9–7)	Cincinnati (7–9)	Cleveland (0–16)				
2018	Baltimore (10–6) ^{^}	Pittsburgh (9–6–1)	Cleveland (7–8–1)	Cincinnati (6–10)				
2019	Baltimore (14–2) ^{^}	Pittsburgh (8–8)	Cleveland (6–10)	Cincinnati (2–14)				
2020	Pittsburgh (12–4) ^{^}	Baltimore (11–5) ^{#}	Cleveland (11–5) ^{#}	Cincinnati (4–11–1)				
2021	Cincinnati (10–7) ^{*}	Pittsburgh (9–7–1) ^{#}	Cleveland (8–9)	Baltimore (8–9)			The NFL expanded its season from 16 to 17 games a year.	
2022	Cincinnati (12–4) ^{^}	Baltimore (10–7) ^{#}	Pittsburgh (9–8)	Cleveland (7–10)				
2023	Baltimore (13–4) ^{^}	Cleveland (11–6) ^{#}	Pittsburgh (10–7) ^{#}	Cincinnati (9–8)				
2024	Baltimore (12–5) ^{^}	Pittsburgh (10–7) ^{#}	Cincinnati (9–8)	Cleveland (3–14)				
2025	Pittsburgh (10–7) ^{^}	Baltimore (8–9)	Cincinnati (6–11)	Cleveland (5–12)				
2026	Cincinnati (7–2)	Pittsburgh (6–3)	Cleveland (6–4)	Baltimore (4–5)				

== See also ==
- NFL rivalries § AFC North
- Ravens–Titans rivalry
- Steelers–Titans rivalry
