= Paul Dunn (running back) =

American football player (born 1948)

No. 21, 86
- Position: Running back

Personal information
- Born: July 14, 1948 (age 78); Little Rock, Arkansas, U.S.
- Listed height: 6 ft 0 in (1.83 m)
- Listed weight: 210 lb (95 kg)

Career information
- High school: San Diego (San Diego, California)
- College: San Diego CC (1966); U.S. International (1967–1969)
- NFL draft: 1970: 13th round, 319th overall pick

Career history
- Cincinnati Bengals (1970); Philadelphia Bell (1974)

Career NFL statistics
- Games played: 5
- Stats at Pro Football Reference

Paul Dunn Jr. (born July 14, 1948) is an American former professional football player who was a running back for one season with the Cincinnati Bengals of the National Football League (NFL). He played college football for the U.S. International Gulls and was selected by the Bengals in the 13th round of the 1970 NFL draft. He also played for the Philadelphia Bell of the World Football League.

== Early life and college ==
Paul Dunn Jr. was born on July 14, 1948, in Little Rock, Arkansas. He attended San Diego High School in San Diego, California.

Dunn first played college football at San Diego City College in 1966. He then transferred to play for the United States International Gulls of United States International University from 1967 to 1969.

== Professional career ==
Dunn was selected by the Cincinnati Bengals in the 13th round, with the 319th overall, of the 1970 NFL draft. He played in five games for the Bengals during the 1970 season. He was released in 1971.

Dunn signed with the Philadelphia Bell of the World Football League in 1974. During the 1974 season, he caught 18 passes for 234 yards and one touchdown while also rushing once for four yards. He wore jersey number 86 with the Bell. Dunn became a free agent after the season. He re-signed with the Bell on July 2, 1975, but was later released.
