= Bob Maddox =

American football player (born 1949)

No. 77, 75
- Positions: Defensive tackle, defensive end

Personal information
- Born: May 2, 1949 (age 77); Frederick, Maryland, U.S.
- Listed height: 6 ft 5 in (1.96 m)
- Listed weight: 237 lb (108 kg)

Career information
- High school: Governor Thomas Johnson (Frederick)
- College: Frostburg State
- NFL draft: 1973: 12th round, 171st overall pick

Career history
- Cincinnati Bengals (1974); Kansas City Chiefs (1975–1976)

Career NFL statistics
- Games played: 28
- Games started: 7
- Touchdowns: 1
- Stats at Pro Football Reference

Robert Earl Maddox (born May 2, 1949) is an American former professional football player who was a defensive lineman in the National Football League (NFL). He played college football for the Frostburg State Bobcats, where he played defensive tackle and defensive end. He then was selected in the seventh round by the Cincinnati Bengals in the 1973 NFL draft. He went on to play for the Kansas City Chiefs for two years afterwards. He was also illegally drafted by the San Francisco 49ers in the 15th round of the 1972 NFL draft.
