= Art May =

American football player (born 1948)

No. 71, 84
- Position: Defensive end

Personal information
- Born: November 16, 1948 (age 77); Bessemer, Alabama, U.S.
- Listed height: 6 ft 3 in (1.91 m)
- Listed weight: 255 lb (116 kg)

Career information
- High school: Abrams (Bessemer)
- College: Tuskegee
- NFL draft: 1971: 5th round, 110th overall pick

Career history
- Cincinnati Bengals (1971)*; New England Patriots (1971–1972); Jacksonville Sharks (1974); Chicago Winds (1975)
- * Offseason or practice squad member only

Career NFL statistics
- Games played: 11
- Stats at Pro Football Reference

Arthur Lee May (born November 16, 1948) is an American former professional football player who was a defensive end for one season with the New England Patriots of the National Football League (NFL). He played college football for the Tuskegee Golden Tigers.

== Early life and college ==
Art May was born on November 16, 1948, in Bessemer, Alabama. He went to Abrams High School and Tuskegee University. He was named All-Conference in his three years of college football. In his final season, he had 79 tackles and 100 assists.

== Professional career ==
May was selected in the fifth round (110th overall) by the Cincinnati Bengals. He did not make the roster with the Bengals and instead signed with the New England Patriots. He played in 11 games, starting 5 with the Patriots in his rookie season. He wore number 71. He was injured in pre-season the next year and missed the entire season. While recovering from the injury, May enjoyed sewing. In 1974 he went to the Jacksonville Sharks of the World Football League. The next season he spent with the Chicago Winds. 1975 was his last season.
