= Bob Trumpy =

American football player (1945–2025)

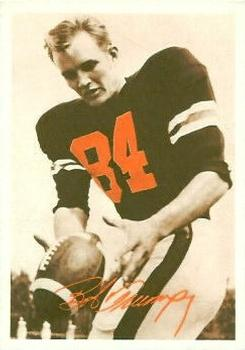
- Trumpy c. 1969

No. 84
- Position: Tight end

Personal information
- Born: March 6, 1945 (Note: A Bengals media guide from Trumpy's tenure with the team in 1972 lists his "hometown" as Springfield, Illinois, while their 1977 guide lists his "birthplace" as Springfield. Sources published in 1993 differ on whether he was born in Bloomington, Indiana, or Bloomington, Illinois. The New York Times wrote in his obituary that he was born in Mount Pulaski, Illinois.)
- Died: November 2, 2025 (aged 80); Glendale, Ohio, U.S
- Listed height: 6 ft 6 in (1.98 m)
- Listed weight: 228 lb (103 kg)

Career information
- High school: Springfield (Springfield, Illinois)
- College: Illinois (1963–1964); Utah (1965–1966)
- NFL draft: 1968: 12th round, 301st overall pick

Career history
- Cincinnati Bengals (1968–1977)

Awards and highlights
- First-team All-AFL (1969); Second-team All-Pro (1970); 2× Pro Bowl (1970, 1973); 2× AFL All-Star (1968, 1969); Cincinnati Bengals 50th Anniversary Team

Career AFL/NFL statistics
- Receptions: 298
- Receiving yards: 4,600
- Receiving touchdowns: 35
- Stats at Pro Football Reference

Robert Theodore Trumpy Jr. (March 6, 1945 – November 2, 2025) was an American professional football player and sports broadcaster. He was a tight end for the Cincinnati Bengals of the American Football League (AFL) and National Football League (NFL) from 1968 through 1977. He was a two-time NFL Pro Bowler and two-time AFL All-Star.

Trumpy played college football for the Illinois Fighting Illini and Utah Utes before being selected by the Bengals in the 12th round of the 1968 NFL/AFL draft. After his playing career, Trumpy spent many years as a broadcast color analyst, calling four Super Bowls. He was given the Pete Rozelle Radio-Television Award by the Pro Football Hall of Fame in 2014.

== Early life ==
Robert Theodore Trumpy Jr. was born on March 6, 1945, and grew up in Tremont, Illinois. When his father, Robert Sr. had a job transfer, his family moved from Tremont to Springfield, Illinois. He played multiple sports at Tremont High School and went to Springfield High School as a sophomore. He was all-state in football and basketball. He was on Springfield's state championship basketball team, and he was team captain as a senior there, as well as being named All-State.

Bob Trumpy played in four state tournaments, which took place at the University of Illinois Urbana-Champaign, during this time, two in basketball and two in track, where he won the 1963 state meet in long jump and tied for fifth in high jump. He was inducted into the Basketball Museum of Illinois Hall of Fame in 1983. In 1991, he was among the first inductees into the Springfield Sports Hall of Fame, and in 1996 he was inducted into the Springfield High Hall of Fame.

== College career ==
After graduation in 1963, Trumpy played college football at the University of Illinois Urbana-Champaign. Since freshmen were not allowed to play on the varsity team, his first season with the Fighting Illini was in 1964 playing as a wide receiver, catching a team-high 28 passes for 428 yards and two touchdowns. He missed the last two games of the season with a knee injury. Trumpy then transferred to the University of Utah in Salt Lake City which required him to miss the 1965 season. In 1966, he converted to the tight end position, catching nine passes for 159 yards and two scores for the Utes. Afterwards, he dropped out of school.

Trumpy briefly studied at Glendale Junior College (now Glendale Community College) in Los Angeles County. After joining the United States Naval Reserve, he was activated into the Navy, serving 180 days during the Vietnam War.

== Professional career ==
After being discharged from the Navy, Trumpy worked briefly as a bill collector before being selected by the AFL's Bengals in the 12th round (301st overall) of the 1968 common draft. Despite his low draft selection, Trumpy worked hard in the offseason and managed to earn the starting tight end spot in the team's lineup. He didn't disappoint in his rookie season, recording 37 receptions for 639 yards and three touchdowns, and earning a place on the AFL Western Division All-Star team. In Cincinnati, Trumpy played under hall of fame coach Paul Brown, head coach Tiger Johnson, and offensive coach Bill Walsh, another hall of fame coach and offensive innovator.

In 1969, Trumpy averaged 22.6 yards per catch, on 37 passes for 835 yards and nine touchdowns. He was selected first-team AFL All-League tight end by numerous entities, including the Associated Press (AP), Pro Football Weekly, the Newspaper Enterprise Association (NEA), and United Press International (UPI), and second-team by The Sporting News and the Professional Football Writers of America. He was again selected to the AFL All-Star team. In a November 1969 game against the Houston Oilers, Trumpy became the first Bengals tight end to record three touchdown receptions in a single game, helping his team to a 31–31 tie. In 1970, with the Bengals now part of the National Football League following the AFL-NFL merger, The Sporting News and AP selected him first-team AFC All-Conference.

Trumpy earned two trips to the Pro Bowl in 1970 and 1973 and continued to play for the Bengals until 1977. In his final season, he caught only 18 passes for 251 yards and one touchdown, but his touchdown was one of the most memorable plays of his career. In a November 20 game against the Miami Dolphins during a driving rainstorm, Trumpy caught a 29-yard touchdown pass from quarterback Ken Anderson on a flea flicker play that involved three players handling the ball before it was thrown to him. First, Anderson handed the ball off to running back Archie Griffin, who then pitched the ball to receiver John McDaniel running in the opposite direction. McDaniel then handed the ball back to Anderson, setting up his 29-yard touchdown pass to Trumpy. The Bengals went on to defeat the Dolphins 23–17, knocking them out of playoff contention.

== NFL/AFL career statistics ==
Legend
**Bold**	Career high

Year	Team	Games		Receiving				
Year	Team	GP	GS	Rec	Yds	Avg	Lng	TD
1968	CIN	14	11	37	639	17.3	**80**	3
1969	CIN	14	14	37	**835**	**22.6**	**80**	**9**
1970	CIN	11	10	29	480	16.6	53	2
1971	CIN	14	14	40	531	13.3	44	3
1972	CIN	12	12	**44**	500	11.4	38	2
1973	CIN	14	13	29	435	15.0	53	5
1974	CIN	13	13	21	330	15.7	41	2
1975	CIN	11	11	22	276	12.5	35	1
1976	CIN	13	13	21	323	15.4	48	7
1977	CIN	12	11	18	251	13.9	32	1
		128	122	298	4,600	15.4	80	35

== Broadcasting career ==
While not a Hall of Fame player, Trumpy had a Hall of Fame broadcasting career. He called four Super Bowls, four Pro Bowls, six Hall-of-Fame Games in football in addition to three Ryder Cups and three Olympics. Trumpy's first broadcast experience was in 1964, working with Coley Cowan on a WTAX in a Springfield, Illinois radio broadcast of a basketball tournament in Springfield. After retiring, he joined WCKY radio as a sports talk host.

Trumpy expanded into NFL broadcasting in 1978, joining NBC as a color analyst for telecasts of AFC games, primarily working with Sam Nover through 1980, then with Bob Costas (1981-1983), and Don Criqui (1984–1988). Trumpy and Criqui also served as NBC Radio's lead NFL announcers from 1985 to 1986, calling Monday Night Football and Super Bowls XX and XXI. In 1992, Trumpy replaced Bill Walsh as NBC's lead NFL analyst, teaming with Dick Enberg until 1995 (when NBC went to a three-man booth with Paul Maguire and Phil Simms replacing him). The team of Enberg and Trumpy called Super Bowls XXVII (1993) and XXVIII (1994). He was paired with Tom Hammond (1995–1996) and Charlie Jones (1997) until NBC lost the AFC broadcasting package to CBS following the 1997 season.

Trumpy hosted a weeknight sports talk show on WLW-AM in Cincinnati (1980–1989), and was Ohio Sports Broadcaster of the Year four times. He left the show to be able to work more assignments at NBC Sports, including PGA Tour golf and the Olympics. He was replaced on the sports talk show by Cris Collinsworth.

On the night of November 10, 1983, while he was hosting his talk show on WLW, the first call that he received was from a despondent woman who said that she wanted to commit suicide. Trumpy spoke to the woman (and, later, her son) for more than two hours until the son gave him their address. He then spoke to the woman and her son for several more minutes after that until his station manager took him off the air. Police in Forest Park, Ohio, went to the address that the son had given and took the woman to a local hospital. Trumpy received praise for his actions from the Forest Park police and suicide prevention counselors. He later said that he had to go to therapy because of the incident.

Trumpy was an analyst for Sunday Night Football on Westwood One radio from 2000 to 2007, save for the 2005 season, when he was replaced by John Riggins. During the first round of the 2006-07 NFL playoffs, Trumpy and Enberg were in the broadcast booth together for the first time since the 1994 AFC Championship Game, covering the Colts–Chiefs game for Westwood One. Trumpy was named the 2014 recipient of the Pete Rozelle Radio-Television Award, given by the Pro Football Hall of Fame for lifetime achievement in NFL broadcasting.

== Personal life and death ==
Trumpy graduated from the University of Utah in 1968 with a Bachelor of Arts degree in business and finance. He and his wife, Pat, had two sons, Matthew and Jason. Trumpy died at home in the Cincinnati suburb of Glendale, Ohio, on November 2, 2025, at age 80.

== See also ==
- List of American Football League players

== Sources ==
- Ludwig, Chick (2004). Cincinnati Bengals: The Legends. Wilmington, Ohio: Orange Frazer Press p. 25 (1). ISBN 1-882203-38-0.

Preceded by Bill Walsh	NFL on NBC lead analyst 1992–1994	Succeeded by Phil Simms and Paul Maguire
