= Chip Bennett =

American football linebacker (born 1947)

Profile
- Position: Linebacker

Personal information
- Born: July 25, 1947 (age 79); Lubbock, Texas, U.S.
- Listed height: 6 ft 3 in (1.91 m)
- Listed weight: 225 lb (102 kg)

Career information
- High school: Denver City (Denver City, Texas)
- College: Abilene Christian (1966–1969)

Awards and highlights
- First-team Little All-American (1969)

Gene Herbert "Chip" Bennett (born July 25, 1947) is an American former football linebacker. He played college football for Abilene Christian University, where he was selected as a Little All-American in 1969.

== College football ==
Bennett played college football as a linebacker for Abilene Christian University during the 1967, 1968, and 1969 seasons. He was selected a first-team linebacker on the 1969 Little All-America college football team. He was later selected in 2005 to Abilene Christian's all-time team and in 2013 as one of the Southland Conference's players of the decade for the 1960s.

== Later life ==
Bennett was selected by the Cincinnati Bengals in the third round (60th overall pick) of the 1970 NFL draft. He did not appear in any regular-season games for the Bengals. He later worked as a farmer and rancher in Yoakum County, Texas.
