= Jess Phillips (American football) =

American football player (born 1947)

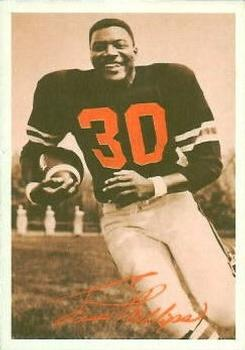

No. 30, 34, 35
- Positions: Running back, Defensive back

Personal information
- Born: February 28, 1947 (age 79); Beaumont, Texas, U.S.
- Listed height: 6 ft 1 in (1.85 m)
- Listed weight: 210 lb (95 kg)

Career information
- High school: Charlton-Pollard (Beaumont)
- College: Michigan State
- NFL draft: 1968: 4th round, 84th overall pick

Career history
- Cincinnati Bengals (1968–1972); New Orleans Saints (1973–1974); Oakland Raiders (1975); New England Patriots (1976–1977)

Awards and highlights
- First-team All-Big Ten (1966)

Career NFL/AFL statistics
- Rushing yards: 3,568
- Rushing average: 4
- Receptions: 114
- Receiving yards: 694
- Total touchdowns: 15
- Fumble recoveries: 8
- Interceptions: 3
- Stats at Pro Football Reference

Jess Willard Phillips Jr. (born February 28, 1947) is an American former professional football player who played running back for 10 seasons in the American Football League (AFL) and National Football League (NFL). He began his pro career with the AFL's Cincinnati Bengals in 1968, and also played for the NFL's Bengals as well as the New Orleans Saints, Oakland Raiders and New England Patriots.

== Early life ==
Phillips grew up in Beaumont, Texas, the oldest of four children. He attended Charlton-Pollard High School.

He played college football at Michigan State University, where he played safety on defense. He played in one of the greatest college football games of all-time, the historic 10-10 tie between undefeated MSU and undefeated Notre Dame. He was a mathematics major.

However, during his senior season he forged a check and was sentenced to 18 months for four years at the penitentiary at Jackson, Michigan. He was paroled after four months; he credits his time in prison with teaching a lot about life, but he gave up hope of being drafted into pro football.

But the expansion Cincinnati Bengals and coach Paul Brown were willing to take a chance on Phillips. He was drafted as a defensive back in the fourth round (84th overall) of the 1968 NFL/AFL Draft by the then-AFL Bengals. He was released from prison on August 2, 1968, and was met by Paul Brown's son, Mike Brown, who took Phillips directly to the Bengals training camp in Wilmington, Ohio, where he was installed as a defensive back. Paul Brown called Phillips "a kid with an engaging personality who has it all in front of him."

In his rookie season, 1968, the expansion Bengals' first season, he played strong safety on defense but also had one carry for seven yards on offense. But in 1969 he was switched to fullback and came on strong with 118 carries for 578 yards (a 4.9 average) and three touchdowns, including a career-long 83-yard run. He also caught 13 passes for 128 yards, a 9.8 average.

In his third season, 1970, he started all 14 games and increased his totals to 163 carried for 648 yards (a 4.0 average) and four touchdowns, plus 31 receptions for 124 yards and one touchdown. In 1971, he started 10 of 14 games, with 94 carries for 420 yards (a 4.5 average) and 22 receptions for 125 yards and one touchdown.

In 1972, his playing time decreased with the Bengals. He started in three of the 13 games he played, with 48 carries for 207 yards (a 4.3 average) and one touchdown, plus 10 receptions for 50 yards.

Phillips joined the New Orleans Saints for the 1973 season and thrived as a starter for all 14 games. He totaled 198 carries for 663 yards (both career highs) although his yards-per-carry average fell to 3.3. He also had 22 receptions for a career-high 169 yards.

In 1974, he was no longer a starter, but still played in all 14 games with 174 carries for 556 yards (a 3.2 average) and two touchdowns with 11 receptions for 55 yards.

By 1975 he joined the Oakland Raiders, for whom he played in all 14 games, starting two, and had 63 carries for 298 yards (a 4.7 average) and one touchdown with four receptions for 25 yards. He also returned 12 kicks for 310 yards, a 25.8 average.

In 1976, he was a member of the New England Patriots, for whom he played 13 games with 24 carries for 164 yards and one touchdown with one reception for 18 yards. He also returned 14 kicks for 397 yards, a career-high 28.4 average. His last season was 1977 with the Patriots. He played all 14 games but with only five carries for 27 yards and one touchdown.

== NFL/AFL career statistics ==
Legend
	Led the league
**Bold**	Career high

=== Regular season ===
Year	Team	Games		Rushing					Receiving				
Year	Team	GP	GS	Att	Yds	Avg	Lng	TD	Rec	Yds	Avg	Lng	TD
1968	CIN	14	11	1	7	**7.0**	7	0	0	0	0.0	0	0
1969	CIN	14	12	118	578	4.9	**83**	3	13	128	9.8	31	0
1970	CIN	14	14	163	648	4.0	76	**4**	**31**	124	4.0	17	**1**
1971	CIN	14	10	94	420	4.5	31	0	22	125	5.7	19	**1**
1972	CIN	13	2	48	207	4.3	20	1	10	50	5.0	15	0
1973	NOR	14	14	**198**	**663**	3.3	20	0	22	**169**	7.7	**34**	0
1974	NOR	14	13	174	556	3.2	14	2	11	55	5.0	17	0
1975	OAK	14	2	63	298	4.7	66	1	4	25	6.3	22	0
1976	NWE	13	0	24	164	6.8	46	1	1	18	**18.0**	18	0
1977	NWE	14	0	5	27	5.4	13	1	0	0	0.0	0	0
		138	78	888	3,568	4.0	83	13	114	694	6.1	34	2

=== Playoffs ===
Year	Team	Games		Rushing					Receiving				
Year	Team	GP	GS	Att	Yds	Avg	Lng	TD	Rec	Yds	Avg	Lng	TD
1970	CIN	1	1	**10**	12	1.2	4	0	**2**	**12**	**6.0**	**6**	0
1975	OAK	2	0	4	**17**	**4.3**	**8**	0	0	0	0.0	0	0
1976	NWE	1	0	3	12	4.0	6	**1**	0	0	0.0	0	0
		4	1	17	41	2.4	8	1	2	12	6.0	6	0

== Personal life ==
During his off-seasons in Cincinnati, Phillips worked as a mortgage loan officer for then Central Trust Bank, and he worked for a company that printed weekly commodity charts and mailed them out to futures' brokers and traders.
