= Hurles Scales =

American football player (born 1950)

No. 38
- Position: Defensive back

Personal information
- Born: December 1, 1950 (age 75); Amarillo, Texas, U.S.
- Listed height: 6 ft 1 in (1.85 m)
- Listed weight: 200 lb (91 kg)

Career information
- High school: Amarillo
- College: Cisco JC (1969–1970); North Texas State (1971–1972)
- NFL draft: 1973: 14th round, 355th overall pick

Career history

Playing
- Cincinnati Bengals (1973)*; St. Louis Cardinals (1974); Chicago Bears (1974); St. Louis Cardinals (1974); Green Bay Packers (1975); Philadelphia Eagles (1977)*
- * Offseason or practice squad member only

Coaching
- North Texas State (1973) Graduate assistant

Career NFL statistics
- Games played: 15
- Fumble recoveries: 1
- Stats at Pro Football Reference

Hurles Eulis Scales Jr. (born December 1, 1950) is an American former professional football player who was a defensive back in the National Football League (NFL). He played college football for the Cisco Wranglers and North Texas State Mean Green and was selected by the Cincinnati Bengals in the 14th round of the 1973 NFL draft. After not making the Bengals' roster, Scales played for the St. Louis Cardinals and Chicago Bears in 1974 and for the Green Bay Packers in 1975. He was also a member of the Philadelphia Eagles and played in a total of 15 NFL games in his career.

== Early life ==
Scales was born on December 1, 1950, in Amarillo, Texas. At age eight, he made it his goal to become an NFL player. He attended Amarillo High School where he was a standout athlete, competing in football, basketball and track and field. In his senior year, he was his basketball team's leading rebounder and in football caught a 66-yard touchdown pass in a win against the number one-ranked team in the state. He was the recipient of the Amarillo Globe-News Most Valuable Sandie Player Award and received the T. G. Hull Award as the "athlete who delivers the most".

== College career ==
After high school, Scales enrolled at Cisco Junior College in 1969. There, he was a two-way player and saw action as a wingback and cornerback. As a sophomore in 1970, he was named all-conference at defensive back. He then transferred to North Texas State University in 1971 and joined the school's football team. Scales played safety for North Texas from 1971 to 1972, being a top player despite the team's poor performance. He led the team in interceptions, with five, as a senior in 1972 and was named All-Missouri Valley Conference. Among his interceptions that year was one he returned 88 yards for a touchdown against West Texas State. He received the nickname "Misguided Missile" during his junior year at North Texas State, explaining that "I had a broken bone in my foot and if I tried to stop quickly or turn, the pain was really severe. So I kept on running and didn't stop until I ran into somebody".

== Professional career ==
Scales was selected in the 14th round (355th overall) of the 1973 NFL draft by the Cincinnati Bengals, although he was waived by the team in July 1973. After being released, Scales worked in 1973 as a graduate assistant at North Texas State. In 1974, he signed with the St. Louis Cardinals and impressed in training camp. He missed the start of the season due to a knee injury and was placed on injured reserve. He was waived by the Cardinals on October 15, then assigned on waivers to the Chicago Bears the following day. He made his NFL debut for the Bears in Week 6, recording no statistics in their 10–9 win over the Green Bay Packers.

Scales was waived by the Bears on October 29, then claimed off waivers by the Cardinals the following day. He appeared in the subsequent seven games for the Cardinals, finishing the 1974 season with eight total games played. He was released by the Cardinals on August 29, 1975, before signing with the Green Bay Packers on October 29. Scales played in seven games for the Packers, recovering one fumble. He was released by the Packers before the 1976 season, on July 26, 1976. He then had a brief stint with the Philadelphia Eagles in 1977, but was released prior to the regular season. He concluded his NFL career with 15 games played.

After his NFL career, Scales worked as a consultant in the import and export business and as a college instructor. He was vice president of the Dallas chapter of the NFL Players Association for four years and also w as chief executive officer of the International Commercial & Industrial Business Group, a consulting business.
