= Jim Romaniszyn =

American football player (1951–2023)

No. 56, 53
- Position: Linebacker

Personal information
- Born: September 17, 1951; Titusville, Pennsylvania, U.S.
- Died: August 22, 2023 (aged 71)
- Listed height: 6 ft 2 in (1.88 m)
- Listed weight: 224 lb (102 kg)

Career information
- High school: Titusville (PA)
- College: Edinboro
- NFL draft: 1973: 13th round, 334th overall pick

Career history
- Cleveland Browns (1973–1974); New England Patriots (1976)
- Stats at Pro Football Reference

Jim Romaniszyn (September 17, 1951 – August 22, 2023) was an American football linebacker. He played for the Cleveland Browns from 1973 to 1974 and for the New England Patriots in 1976.

Romaniszyn died on August 22, 2023, at the age of 71.
