= Larry Ely =

American football player (born 1947)

No. 59, 54
- Position: Linebacker

Personal information
- Born: December 19, 1947 (age 78); Iowa City, Iowa, U.S.
- Listed height: 6 ft 1 in (1.85 m)
- Listed weight: 230 lb (104 kg)

Career information
- High school: Roosevelt (IA)
- College: Iowa
- NFL draft: 1970: 16th round, 397th overall pick

Career history
- Cincinnati Bengals (1970–1971); Chicago Bears (1975)

Awards and highlights
- Second-team All-Big Ten (1969)
- Stats at Pro Football Reference

Lawrence Orlo Ely Jr. (born December 19, 1947) is an American former professional football player who was a linebacker for the Cincinnati Bengals and Chicago Bears of the National Football League (NFL). He played college football for the Iowa Hawkeyes. He also played in the Canadian Football League (CFL) for the BC Lions and in the World Football League (WFL) for the Florida Blazers.
