= Dave Lewis (punter) =

American football player (born 1945)

No. 15
- Positions: Quarterback, Punter

Personal information
- Born: October 16, 1945 (age 81); Clovis, California, U.S.
- Listed height: 6 ft 2 in (1.88 m)
- Listed weight: 216 lb (98 kg)

Career information
- High school: Clovis
- College: Stanford
- NFL draft: 1967: 5th round, 109th overall pick

Career history
- Montreal Alouettes (1967–1968); Cincinnati Bengals (1970–1973); Montreal Alouettes (1975)

Awards and highlights
- First-team All-Pro (1970); Second-team All-Pro (1971)

Career NFL statistics
- Punts: 285
- Punting yards: 12,447
- Longest punt: 63
- Stats at Pro Football Reference

David Ray Lewis (born October 16, 1945) is an American former professional football player who was a punter and quarterback for the Cincinnati Bengals of the National Football League (NFL) from 1970 to 1973. He played college football for the Stanford Cardinal and was selected in the fifth round of the 1967 NFL/AFL draft by the New York Giants. Lewis led the NFL in punting in 1970 and 1971. For all punters with at least 100 punts in the 1970s, Lewis ranked 1st with 43.7. He also played three seasons for the Montreal Alouettes of the Canadian Football League.
