= Nick Roman =

American football player (1947–2003)

No. 81
- Position: Defensive end

Personal information
- Born: September 23, 1947; Canton, Ohio, U.S.
- Died: May 18, 2003 (aged 55); Columbus, Ohio, U.S.
- Listed height: 6 ft 3 in (1.91 m)
- Listed weight: 244 lb (111 kg)

Career information
- High school: McKinley (Canton)
- College: Ohio State (1965–1969)
- NFL draft: 1970: 10th round, 241st overall pick

Career history
- Cincinnati Bengals (1970–1971); Cleveland Browns (1972–1974); Kansas City Chiefs (1975)*; Toronto Argonauts (1976)*
- * Offseason or practice squad member only

Awards and highlights
- National champion (1968)

Career NFL statistics
- Fumble recoveries: 5
- Interceptions: 1
- Defensive TDs: 1
- Stats at Pro Football Reference

Nicholas George Roman (September 23, 1947 – May 18, 2003) was an American professional football defensive end who played five seasons in the National Football League (NFL) with the Cincinnati Bengals and Cleveland Browns. He was selected by the Bengals in the tenth round of the 1970 NFL draft after playing college football at Ohio State University.

== Early life and college ==
Nicholas George Roman was born on September 23, 1947, in Canton, Ohio. He attended Canton McKinley High School in Canton. He was inducted into the Stark County High School Football Hall of Fame in 2019.

Roman was a member of the Ohio State Buckeyes of Ohio State University from 1965 to 1969. He was a letterman in 1966, 1967, and 1969. Roman enrolled in Reserve Officers' Training Corps (ROTC) in 1968 due to thinking he would get drafted. However, he suffered a knee injury during ROTC training and missed the entire 1968 football season. The 1968 Buckeyes were consensus national champions.

== Professional career ==
Roman was selected by the Cincinnati Bengals in the 10th round, with the 241st overall pick, of the 1970 NFL draft. He officially signed with the team on August 4. He played in four games for the Bengals in 1970 and posted one sack. He also appeared in one playoff game that year. Roman played in 12 games during the 1971 season, recording one sack and one fumble recovery. He was released by the Bengals on September 12, 1972.

Roman signed with the Cleveland Browns on October 4, 1972. He appeared in ten games, starting seven, for the Browns in 1972, totaling 3.5 sacks and one interception that he returned 36 yards for a touchdown. He also started a playoff game that year, posting 1.3 sacks. Roman started all 14 games for the Browns in 1973, recording 6.5 sacks, as the team finished 7–5–2. He became a free agent after the 1973 season and re-signed with Cleveland on August 20, 1974. He played in 12 games, starting nine, in 1974, recording 3.5 sacks and four fumble recoveries for 47 yards. Roman was released by the Browns on February 12, 1975.

Roman was signed by the Kansas City Chiefs on March 4, 1975. However, he was later released.

Roman signed with the Toronto Argonauts of the Canadian Football League in 1976 but was later released.

== Personal life ==
Roman's parents were Romanian immigrants. His brother, Dan Roman, played college football for the Purdue Boilermakers. Nick died of a heart attack at his home in Columbus, Ohio on May 18, 2003.
