= Sandy Durko =

American football player (born 1948)

No. 29, 22
- Position: Defensive back

Personal information
- Born: August 29, 1948 (age 78); Los Angeles, California, U.S.
- Listed height: 6 ft 1 in (1.85 m)
- Listed weight: 185 lb (84 kg)

Career information
- High school: West Covina (West Covina, California)
- College: USC
- NFL draft: 1970: 6th round, 137th overall pick

Career history
- Cincinnati Bengals (1970–1971); New England Patriots (1973–1974)

Awards and highlights
- First-team All-Pac-8 (1969)

Career NFL statistics
- Interceptions: 7
- Stats at Pro Football Reference

Sandy Vincent Durko (born August 29, 1948) is an American former professional football player who was a defensive back in the National Football League (NFL).

Durko played football at West Covina High School in West Covina, California, leading the team to a 1965 CIF championship.

Durko played college football for the USC Trojans as a starting defensive back. In the 1968 USC-Notre Dame game, on the second play from scrimmage Durko intercepted a Joe Theismann pass and returned it for a touchdown in a game that ended in a 21–21 tie.

He was selected in the sixth round (137th overall) of the 1970 NFL draft by the Cincinnati Bengals.

He played in only one game in his rookie year of 1970, the Bengals' first year in the NFL after the AFL-NFL merger. In 1971, however, he saw significant playing time at free safety, playing in all 14 games with four interceptions returned for a total of 46 yards. He also returned six punts for 14 yards and even rushed once for seven yards.

In 1973, he joined the New England Patriots and started in all of the Patriots' 14 games, picking off three passes. He also returned three punts for 21 yards. The following year, 1974, was his fourth and final NFL season, as Durko played 11 games and started four for the Patriots.

In 2011, he was one of 12 honorees inducted into the West Covina Walk of Fame, which "honors athletes, coaches and sports volunteers from the city who have made significant contributions in making West Covina a better place to live, work and play.

Durko is currently an investment management professional in Los Angeles.
