= Doug Dressler =

American football player (born 1948)

No. 44, 41
- Position: Running back

Personal information
- Born: August 19, 1948; Beaver Falls, Pennsylvania, U.S.
- Died: November 7, 2024 (aged 76); Chico, California, U.S.
- Listed height: 6 ft 2 in (1.88 m)
- Listed weight: 228 lb (103 kg)

Career information
- High school: Las Vegas (NV)
- College: Chico State
- NFL draft: 1970: undrafted

Career history
- Cincinnati Bengals (1970–1974); Kansas City Chiefs (1975); New England Patriots (1975)

Awards and highlights
- Chico State Athletic Hall of Fame (1987)

Career NFL statistics
- Rushing attempts-yards: 278-1125
- Receptions-yards: 90-695
- Touchdowns: 11
- Stats at Pro Football Reference

Douglas Jennings Dressler (August 19, 1948 – November 7, 2024) was an American former professional football player who was a running back for five seasons in the National Football League (NFL) for the Cincinnati Bengals, Kansas City Chiefs, and New England Patriots. He played college football for the Chico State Wildcats. Dressler also played rugby for the Glenn County Warriors.

== Early life ==
Doug Dressler was born in Beaver Falls, Pennsylvania, the first of three children of Richard Gale Dressler and Patricia Jennings Dressler. Richard, a U.S. Navy veteran, was employed by National Cash Register, Booz Allen Hamilton, Lockheed, and Addressograph Multigraph, and later owned a printing business.

Dressler's family moved from Pennsylvania to North Hollywood, California when he was an infant. His sophomore year in high school, Dressler transferred to Las Vegas High School, from which he graduated.

After high school, he attended the College of Marin in Kentfield, California. He then enrolled in Chico State University, where he played tight end and defensive end and was also fourth in the nation as a heavyweight wrestler.

== Professional career ==
Dressler in 1970 signed as an undrafted free agent with the Cincinnati Bengals, and was part of the 1970 team that won the Bengals' first-ever title, the AFC Central Division championship. He played for the Bengals from 1970 to 1974.

His best year was 1972, when he rushed for 565 yards, averaging 4.4 yards per carry and scoring six of his nine career rushing touchdowns. Dressler and Essex Johnson became the first Bengals running back duo to rush for more than 100 yards each in one game against the Houston Oilers on Oct. 29, as Dressler had 110 yards and Johnson 103. He also scored three touchdowns in one game, again against the Oilers, and in a game against the Pittsburgh Steelers he had a career-high nine receptions.

In 1975, he played with the New England Patriots and the Kansas City Chiefs.

== Personal life ==
After retiring from the NFL, Dressler was always active in youth sports as a coach, baseball umpire and wrestling official. He also played rugby with the Hastings Law School Rugby Football Club.

He and his wife, Jody (whom Doug met while at Chico State) were Menlo Park, California and Atherton, California residents for 31 years. After 25 years, Doug Dressler retired from his teaching post at Kennedy Middle School in Redwood City, California in 2009 and Jody retired from her position as a special education teacher for the San Mateo County Office of Education after 35 years. They reside in Lake Almanor, California. They have two children, son Bodey and daughter Shayla.

Dressler died on November 7, 2024.
