= Bill Peterson (linebacker) =

American football player (born 1945)

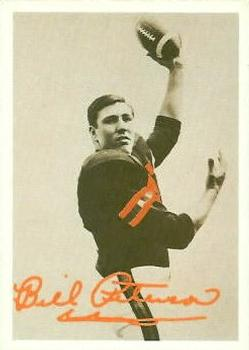
- Peterson in 1969

No. 53, 55
- Position: Linebacker

Personal information
- Born: June 6, 1945 (age 81); San Diego, California, U.S.
- Listed height: 6 ft 3 in (1.91 m)
- Listed weight: 230 lb (104 kg)

Career information
- High school: Clairemont (San Diego)
- College: San Jose State
- NFL draft: 1967: undrafted

Career history
- San Jose Apaches (1967); Cincinnati Bengals (1968–1972); New England Patriots (1973); Philadelphia Bell (1974); Kansas City Chiefs (1975)

Career NFL/AFL statistics
- Fumble recoveries: 2
- Interceptions: 5
- Sacks: 1
- Stats at Pro Football Reference

William Wallace Peterson (born June 6, 1945) is an American former professional football player who was a linebacker in the American Football League (AFL) and National Football League (NFL). He played college football for the San Jose State Spartans. He played pro ball for five seasons with the Cincinnati Bengals one season with Kansas City Chiefs and one season with the New England Patriots.
