= Neal Craig =

American football player (1948–2021)

No. 34, 42, 49
- Position: Safety

Personal information
- Born: April 21, 1948; Cincinnati, Ohio, U.S.
- Died: August 9, 2021 (aged 73); Cincinnati, Ohio, U.S.

Career information
- High school: Cincinnati (OH) Taft
- College: Fisk
- NFL draft: 1971: 7th round, 171st overall pick

Career history
- Cincinnati Bengals (1971–1973); Buffalo Bills (1974); Cleveland Browns (1975–1976)

Career NFL statistics
- Interceptions: 8
- INT yards: 191
- Touchdowns: 2
- Stats at Pro Football Reference

Cornelius "Neal" Craig Jr. (April 21, 1948 – August 9, 2021) was an American professional football player who was a safety in the National Football League (NFL). He was drafted by the Cincinnati Bengals in the seventh round of the 1971 NFL draft. He played college football at Fisk University.

He died on August 9, 2021.
