= Mike Kelly (tight end) =

American football player (born 1948)

No. 87
- Position: Tight end

Personal information
- Born: January 14, 1948 (age 78); Davidson, North Carolina, U.S.
- Listed height: 6 ft 4 in (1.93 m)
- Listed weight: 215 lb (98 kg)

Career information
- High school: North Mecklenburg
- College: Davidson
- NFL draft: 1970: undrafted

Career history
- Cincinnati Bengals (1970–1972); New Orleans Saints (1973)
- Stats at Pro Football Reference

Michael Grey Kelly (born January 14, 1948) is an American former professional football player who was a tight end for the Cincinnati Bengals and the New Orleans Saints of the National Football League (NFL). He played college football for the Davidson Wildcats.
