= Willie Jones (defensive lineman, born 1942) =

No. 71, 74, 78, 72
- Position: Defensive lineman

Personal information
- Born: May 28, 1942 (age 84); Moro, Arkansas, U.S.
- Listed height: 6 ft 1 in (1.85 m)
- Listed weight: 260 lb (118 kg)

Career information
- High school: McKinley (St. Louis, Missouri)
- College: Kansas State (1962–1965)
- NFL draft: 1966: 18th round, 271st overall pick

Career history
- Houston Oilers (1967); Cincinnati Bengals (1968–1972); St. Louis Cardinals (1973)*; Houston Texans/Shreveport Steamer (1974–1975)
- * Offseason or practice squad member only
- Stats at Pro Football Reference

Willie Lee Jones (born May 28, 1942) is an American former professional football player who was a defensive lineman for four seasons in the American Football League (AFL) and National Football League (NFL). He played college football for the Kansas State Wildcats and was selected by the St. Louis Cardinals in the 18th round of the 1966 NFL draft. Jones went on to play for the Houston Oilers and Cincinnati Bengals in the AFL, and the Bengals in the NFL. He also played for the Houston Texans/Shreveport Steamer of the World Football League (WFL).

== Early life and college ==
Willie Lee Jones was born on May 28, 1942, in Moro, Arkansas. He attended McKinley High School in St. Louis, Missouri.

Jones played college football for the Kansas State Wildcats of Kansas State University. He was on the freshman team in 1962 and was a three-year letterman from 1963 to 1965.

== Professional career ==
Jones was selected by the St. Louis Cardinals in the 18th round, with the 271st overall pick, of the 1966 NFL draft. However, he did not sign with the Cardinals.

Jones signed with the Houston Oilers of the American Football League (AFL) in 1967. He played in six games, starting three, for the Oilers during the 1967 before being released on October 27, 1967.

In January 1968, Jones was selected by the Cincinnati Bengals in the 1968 AFL expansion draft. He started one game for the Bengals during the 1968 season. He played in ten games, starting five, in 1970, recording one sack and one fumble recovery. Jones also played in one playoff game that year. He appeared in five games in 1971.

In April 1973, Jones was traded to the St. Louis Cardinals for a future draft pick. However, he was later released.

Jones was a member of the Houston Texans/Shreveport Steamer of the World Football League (WFL) during the 1974 WFL season. He re-signed with the Steamer on June 10, 1975. He retired on August 27, 1975, during the 1975 WFL season.
