= Al Beauchamp =

American football player (born 1944)

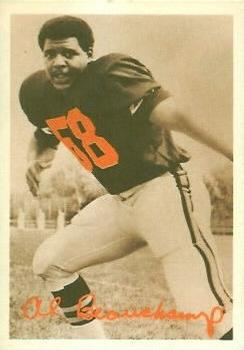

No. 58
- Position: Linebacker

Personal information
- Born: June 25, 1944 (age 82); Baton Rouge, Louisiana, U.S.
- Listed height: 6 ft 2 in (1.88 m)
- Listed weight: 237 lb (108 kg)

Career information
- High school: Baton Rouge
- College: Southern
- NFL draft: 1968: 5th round, 138th overall pick

Career history
- Cincinnati Bengals (1968-1975); St. Louis Cardinals (1976)

Career NFL/AFL statistics
- Fumble recoveries: 8
- Interceptions: 15
- Touchdowns: 3
- Sacks: 8.5
- Stats at Pro Football Reference

Alfred Beauchamp (born June 25, 1944) is an American former professional football player who was a linebacker in the American Football League (AFL) and National Football League (NFL). He played college football for the Southern Jaguars and was chosen in the fifth round (138th overall) of the 1968 NFL/AFL draft by the AFL's expansion Cincinnati Bengals. He signed with the team on June 12, 1968.

In his rookie season of 1968, also the Bengals' first year as a franchise, he played in all 14 Bengals games at linebacker, snaring two interceptions for 35 yards. One of those interceptions resulted in his first career touchdown in a win over the Buffalo Bills as he intercepted a pass and returned it 17 yards for the score.

In 1969, he played in 13 Bengals games. Then, in 1970, the team's first season in the National Football League (NFL), Beauchamp broke into the starting lineup, starting all 14 games and helping leading the Bengals to their first-ever winning record, 8–6, and first title as American Football Conference Central Division champion.

In 1971, he again started all 14 games with a career-high six interceptions that he returned 53 yards, including one touchdown. For the next four seasons, 1972 through 1975, he played in all 56 games, starting 55 of them.

After eight seasons with the Bengals, on June 21, 1976, he was traded to the St. Louis Cardinals for a fourth-round draft pick.

He played his ninth and final season in 1976 for the Cardinals, playing all 14 games. For his nine-year career, he played in 125 games, missing only one game.

== See also ==
- List of American Football League players
