= Royce Berry =

American football player (born 1946)

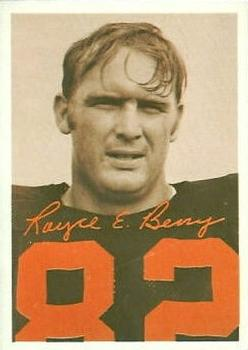

No. 82
- Position: Defensive end

Personal information
- Born: April 19, 1946 (age 80); Odessa, Texas, U.S.
- Listed height: 6 ft 4 in (1.93 m)
- Listed weight: 250 lb (113 kg)

Career information
- High school: Odessa (TX) Permian
- College: Houston
- NFL draft: 1969: 7th round, 161st overall pick

Career history
- Cincinnati Bengals (1969–1974); Chicago Bears (1976)

Career NFL/AFL statistics
- Fumble recoveries: 8
- Touchdowns: 2
- Sacks: 21.5
- Stats at Pro Football Reference

Royce Elmer Berry (born April 19, 1946) is an American former defensive end in the American Football League (AFL) in 1969 and in the National Football League (NFL) from 1970 to 1976.

== Early life ==
Berry grew up in Odessa, Texas, and played football at Permian High School. He was also on the 1964 basketball team, the first in program history to win the district championship, as well as the baseball team.

Berry played college football for the Houston in 1965, 1966 and in 1968. He missed the 1967 season due to injury.

== NFL career ==
He was drafted by the Cincinnati Bengals in the seventh round (161st overall) of the 1969 AFL/NFL Common Draft. In his sophomore season of 1970, he started all 14 games as a defensive end, most notably the first-ever Bengals-Cleveland Browns matchup in which Berry scooped up a fumble and returned it 58 yards for a touchdown.

He missed only one start between 1970 and 1973 at left defensive end as part of a formidable line along with Mike Reid, Steve Chomyszak and Ron Carpenter.

In 1974, he played in 13 games, starting one. He was on injured reserve with a broken wrist and did not see action for the Bengals in 1975. Berry served as defensive captain for six seasons.

In May, 1976, Berry was traded to the Chicago Bears. Berry returned for one more NFL season, his eighth, in 1976 with the Chicago Bears, for whom he played in 12 games, starting two. He was waived by the Bears just prior to the 1977 season.
