= Bob Johnson (American football) =

American football player (born 1946)

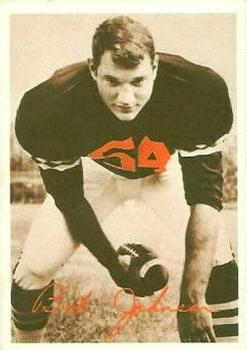
- Johnson c. 1969

No. 54
- Position: Center

Personal information
- Born: August 19, 1946 (age 80); Gary, Indiana, U.S.
- Listed height: 6 ft 5 in (1.96 m)
- Listed weight: 262 lb (119 kg)

Career information
- High school: Bradley (Cleveland, Tennessee)
- College: Tennessee (1965–1967)
- NFL draft: 1968: 1st round, 2nd overall pick

Career history
- Cincinnati Bengals (1968–1979)

Awards and highlights
- AFL All-Star (1968); Cincinnati Bengals 50th Anniversary Team; Cincinnati Bengals No. 54 retired; Unanimous All-American (1967); Jacobs Blocking Trophy (1967); 2× First-team All-SEC (1966, 1967)

Career AFL/NFL statistics
- Games played: 154
- Games started: 136
- Fumble recoveries: 6
- Stats at Pro Football Reference
- College Football Hall of Fame

Robert Douglas Johnson (born August 19, 1946) is an American former professional football player who was a center for 12 seasons with the Cincinnati Bengals, first in the American Football League (AFL), and then in the National Football League (NFL). He played college football for the Tennessee Volunteers. Johnson was the Bengals' first-ever draft selection when he was chosen with the second overall pick in the 1968 NFL/AFL draft.

== College career ==
Johnson played college football at the University of Tennessee, where he was the first recruit of Tennessee coach Doug Dickey. He was named both All-Southeastern Conference (SEC) and All-American in 1966 and again in 1967. He earned the Jacobs Trophy, given to the SEC's best blocker, and he was named the SEC's Most Outstanding Lineman by the Birmingham Touchdown Club. Johnson finished sixth in the Heisman Trophy voting as a center.

Also in 1967, he was named an Academic All-American and was vice president of his class while earning a degree in industrial engineering.

In 1989, he was inducted into the College Football Hall of Fame.

== Professional career ==
He was the first player chosen by the Bengals in their initial season in 1968. He was the second pick overall in the draft, preceded by future Hall of Famer Ron Yary. He was the second highest-drafted center ever selected in an NFL Draft, after Ki Aldrich in 1939.

He was an AFL All-Star in 1968.

Johnson was the last original Bengal to retire, after the 1978 season. His uniform number 54 was retired by the team, and remains the only number the team has retired. However, he came out of retirement in 1979 when Bengals center Blair Bush suffered a knee injury and the Bengals asked Johnson to return as a long snapper on punts, field goals and extra points.

Following his retirement as a player, Johnson worked as a color analyst on Bengals radio from 1981 to 1985. He also worked as a color analyst on some ESPN college football broadcasts in 1979 prior to his return to the Bengals.
