= Ken Johnson (defensive end, born 1947) =

American football player (born 1947)

No. 80
- Position: Defensive end / Defensive tackle

Personal information
- Born: February 12, 1947 (age 79); Anderson, Indiana, U.S.
- Listed height: 6 ft 6 in (1.98 m)
- Listed weight: 265 lb (120 kg)

Career information
- High school: Anderson
- College: Indiana
- NFL draft: 1970: undrafted

Career history
- Dallas Cowboys (1970)*; Cincinnati Bengals (1970–1977)
- * Offseason or practice squad member only

Awards and highlights
- Basketball All-Big Ten (1970)

Career NFL statistics
- Games played: 79
- Games started: 36
- Fumble recoveries: 2
- Stats at Pro Football Reference

Ralph Kenneth Johnson (born February 12, 1947) is an American former professional football player who was a defensive lineman for the Cincinnati Bengals of the National Football League (NFL). He played college basketball for the Indiana Hoosiers.

== Early life ==
Johnson had to repeat the fifth grade because of low grades and was cut from both his junior high school football and basketball teams. He eventually developed into a top athlete at Anderson High School, where he received All-State and All-American honors in both sports as a senior (in football as an End).

He accepted a basketball scholarship from Indiana University Bloomington to play under coach Lou Watson. As a sophomore, he was a backup, averaging 5.9 points and 6.5 rebounds per game.

As a junior, he was named the starter at center, averaging 18.2 points and 12.2 rebounds per game, while being voted team MVP. As a senior, he began to experiment with alcohol and drugs, which although it was speculated on the media that it affected his play on the court, he would repeat as the team MVP and received All-Big Ten honors, after averaging 14.7 points and 10.5 rebounds per game.

== Professional career ==
=== Dallas Cowboys ===
Johnson was selected by the Cleveland Cavaliers in the 10th round of 1970 NBA draft, after dropping because of character concerns. Indiana Hoosiers men's basketball coach Bob Knight recommended Johnson to vice president of player personnel Gil Brandt, who retrospectively said "Our mistake with Johnson was that we tried to make him into an offensive tackle. The Bengals [who later claimed Johnson on waivers from the Cowboys] tried him on the defensive line. That was where he belonged".

In 1970, although he never played a down of college football, after a successful tryout he signed with the Dallas Cowboys as an undrafted free agent, with the intention of playing him at tight end. He followed on the foot steps of Cornell Green, Peter Gent and Percy Howard, as basketball players that were converted by the Cowboys to play professional football. He was eventually moved to offensive tackle and waived before the start of the season on September 2.

=== Cincinnati Bengals ===
On September 2, 1970, Johnson was claimed off waivers by the Cincinnati Bengals, with the intention of playing him at defensive end. He was released on September 7 and signed to the taxi squad the next day.

In 1971, he made the team as a backup defensive lineman, playing both as a defensive tackle and defensive end. In 1972, he appeared in 11 games, starting 3 of them in place of injured players.

In 1974, he was named the starter at left defensive end. In 1976, the Bengals traded for Coy Bacon, who played at a Pro Bowl level and relegated Johnson back into a reserve role.

In 1977, he was lost for the season after injuring his knee in the 10th game against the Miami Dolphins. He was released on August 29, 1978.

== Personal life ==
Johnson became an assistant pastor at the Greater Atlanta Healing Temple. He is also a motivational speaker for the Sports World Ministries. In 1977, he nearly died when his vehicle was hit and dragged by a train for more than 100 yards.
