= Chuck Weber (American football) =

American football player and coach (1930–2017)

No. 83, 89, 51
- Positions: Linebacker, defensive end, guard

Personal information
- Born: March 25, 1930; Philadelphia, Pennsylvania, U.S.
- Died: October 22, 2017 (aged 87); California, U.S.
- Listed height: 6 ft 1 in (1.85 m)
- Listed weight: 229 lb (104 kg)

Career information
- High school: Abington (Abington, Pennsylvania)
- College: West Chester
- NFL draft: 1955: undrafted

Career history

Playing
- Cleveland Browns (1955–1956); Chicago Cardinals (1956-1958); Philadelphia Eagles (1959–1961)

Coaching
- Boston Patriots (1965-1967) Defensive backfield; San Diego Chargers (1968-1969) Defensive backfield; Cincinnati Bengals (1970–1975) Defensive coordinator; St. Louis Cardinals (1976–1977) Defensive backfield; Cleveland Browns (1978–1979) Defensive backfield; Baltimore Colts (1980–1981) Defensive coordinator; San Diego Chargers (1982–1985) Linebackers

Awards and highlights
- 2× NFL champion (1955, 1960)

Career NFL statistics
- Interceptions: 10
- Fumble recoveries: 6
- Sacks: 2.5
- Stats at Pro Football Reference
- Coaching profile at Pro Football Reference

Charles Frederick Weber Jr. (March 25, 1930 – October 22, 2017) was an American professional football linebacker in the National Football League (NFL). He played seven seasons for the Cleveland Browns (1955–1956), the Chicago Cardinals (1956–1958), and the Philadelphia Eagles (1959–1961). He played college football for the West Chester Golden Rams.

After retirement, he worked as defensive coordinator for Cincinnati Bengals and Baltimore Colts, where he succeeded teammate Maxie Baughan.

== Biography ==
Weber grew up in suburban Philadelphia and went to Abington High School.

He was the defensive coordinator of the Cincinnati Bengals from 1970 through 1974. Weber provided six interceptions for Philadelphia Eagles 1960 championship team.

Weber resided in San Diego, California and died on October 22, 2017, at the age of eighty-seven.
