= Pat Matson =

American football player (1944–2025)

No. 73
- Position: Guard

Personal information
- Born: July 22, 1944; Laramie, Wyoming, U.S.
- Died: September 8, 2025 (aged 81)

Career information
- College: Oregon
- NFL draft: 1966: undrafted

Career history
- Denver Broncos (1966–1967); Cincinnati Bengals (1968–1974); Green Bay Packers (1975)
- Stats at Pro Football Reference

Pat Matson (July 22, 1944 – September 8, 2025) was an American Football League and National Football League offensive lineman. He played for the Denver Broncos (1966–1967), the Cincinnati Bengals (1968–1974), and the Green Bay Packers (1975). He played college football at University of Oregon.
