= 1976 Tampa Bay Buccaneers season =

American football season

- Owner: Hugh Culverhouse
- Head coach: John McKay
- Home stadium: Tampa Stadium

Results
- Record: 0–14
- Division place: 5th AFC West
- Playoffs: Did not qualify
- Pro Bowlers: None
- Team MVP: Dave Pear

The 1976 Tampa Bay Buccaneers season was the franchise's first season in the National Football League (NFL). The Buccaneers played their home games at Tampa Stadium and their inaugural head coach was John McKay. The Buccaneers gained infamy as the first team to play an entire 14-game season without winning or tying a single game (including five games where they never scored). It remains one of only four winless seasons since the 1970 AFL-NFL merger. The Buccaneers did not score until their third game and did not score a touchdown until their fourth. They lost by more than a touchdown eleven times. Colorful, maverick former USC coach McKay, whose wisecracking remarks occasionally agitated fans and the league, led the team. The only bright spot was future Pro Football Hall of Fame inductee Lee Roy Selmon, who made his rookie debut in an injury-plagued season.

The expansion draft was largely made up of aging veterans, giving the Buccaneers little basis for success. The lack of medical information provided on players in the expansion draft contributed heavily to the team's problems, as they finished the season with 17 players on injured reserve. They were last in the league in points scored, touchdowns, and rushing touchdowns. After a 19-point fourth-quarter performance brought them within striking distance of a victory in week 8 against the Kansas City Chiefs, they were blown out of every game the rest of the season. Subsequent expansion teams were given a more generous allotment of draft picks and expansion draft opportunities, in part to avoid a repeat of the Buccaneers' difficulties.

This was the only season in which the Buccaneers were not members of the NFC. Instead, they played in the AFC's West Division, after which they switched conferences with their expansion brethren, the Seattle Seahawks, who took their spot in the AFC West per the NFL's plan to have the two teams play all of the other teams in their first two seasons. From 1977 to 2001, the Buccaneers represented the NFC Central, which was otherwise filled with teams from the Great Lakes region (Bears, Lions, Packers and Vikings). Since 2002, both teams have played in the NFC, with the Buccaneers in the South and the Seahawks in the West.

Compiling a -287 point differential (-20.5 per game), the 1976 Buccaneers compiled the worst point differential of any NFL team since the AFL–NFL merger, a record that still stands as of 2025. They broke the record previously set by the 1972 Patriots, who were outscored by 254 points.

== John McKay ==
Owner Hugh Culverhouse, encouraged by recommendations from Vice President of Operations Ron Wolf and Alabama coaching legend Bear Bryant, chose John McKay, winner of four national championships with the USC Trojans, as the first Buccaneer head coach. Aided by a string of great tailbacks, including Heisman Trophy winners O. J. Simpson and Mike Garrett, McKay was credited with popularizing the I formation. Other candidates considered included Hank Stram, Ara Parseghian, and Joe Paterno. McKay was reportedly offered a five-year contract worth $750,000, plus cars, insurance, and real estate, and turned down an offer from the Seattle Seahawks and a counter-offer from USC to take the job. Critical of the NFL, he had turned down offers from professional teams in the past. McKay cited NCAA cutbacks in finances and recruiting as motivations for leaving the college ranks, saying simply that it was "time to try something else". McKay's only promise was that he would beat what he called "Pittsburgh's timetable", referencing the fact that it took the Steelers 41 years to win their first championship. Coach McKay would prove to be somewhat correct as Tampa Bay won the NFC's Central Division in 1979, the team's fourth year of existence, though it would take the team 27 seasons to win its first championship in the 2002 season. Their second championship would come 18 seasons later in Super Bowl LV.

=== McKay quotes ===
McKay had a natural sense of humor that helped him to cope with the pressures of the long losing streak, and it was not unusual for his press conferences to resemble comedy routines. While this may have helped cope with the on-field frustrations, it also served to mask how difficult the experience was for him, a situation his son Rich compared to "taking off in a jet airplane and finding out that neither engine works."

- On hearing about kicker Pete Rajecki's nervousness at playing in front of McKay: "That's unfortunate, as I plan on attending all the games".
- At a postgame press conference: "You guys don't know the difference between a football and a bunch of bananas."
- At the following week's press conference, after a member of the media left a case of bananas at his door: "You guys don't know the difference between a football and a Mercedes-Benz."
- On John Brodie's comment that Steve Spurrier throws one of three passes into the ground: "That's OK, we'll just get shorter receivers."
- "We've determined that we can't win at home and we can't win on the road. What we need is a neutral site."
- "Well we didn't block, but we made up for it by not tackling."
- "We can't stop a pass or a run. Otherwise, we're in great shape."
- When asked how he compared coaching in Tampa to coaching at USC: "It's a three-hour time difference."
- "Mr. Culverhouse has been a great owner. He hasn't come to the dressing room yet to give me any suggestions. Well, I need some advice. I called the Baltimore owner, but he was busy".
- To players planning on staying in Tampa over the offseason: "Stop by my office tomorrow and pick up some fake noses and mustaches so no one recognizes your sorry asses".
- "We'll be back. Maybe not in this century, but we'll be back."

Additionally, assistant coach Dennis Fryzel, when the team was penalized for having 12 players on the field, asked a referee, "Which one was it?" And after injured guard Ira Gordon suffered a neck injury and was sent by McKay to get an X-ray to see what was wrong, Gordon reportedly told McKay, "Coach, I got the x-ray, but I don't feel any better".

=== McKay's comments on coaching in the NFL ===
I don't know what this pro football mystique is. I've gone to the pro camps. They throw the ball, they catch the ball. Many of them are ex-USC players. I'm not amazed at what they do. I've watched the pros play. They run traps, they pitch the ball, they sweep. What else is there?
– John McKay, Sports Illustrated

Coach McKay had won four national championships while coaching at USC, and he never hesitated to express his lack of awe at the NFL. He earned enemies in the league with his dismissive comments and nonchalant attitude. The league liked to promote the games as having life-or-death significance, and were undercut by a coach who would make statements such as, "You draw Xs and Os on a blackboard and that's not so difficult. I can even do it with my left hand". Such statements made the Buccaneers' road more difficult, as a feeling grew around the league that McKay was a newcomer who needed to be taught a lesson. Linebacker Richard "Batman" Wood echoed those sentiments: "It was a brand-new organization. Who cared about us? They wanted to devastate us, beat us in the ground. And with coach McKay coming from college, they wanted to maybe even play us a little harder." Examples given of opponents using McKay's comments as an excuse to run up the score included the reverse that Denver ran late in a 48–13 victory, and the timeout that Chuck Fairbanks called at the end of the Patriots game to enable Steve Grogan to break the NFL record of season rushing touchdowns by a quarterback. One sports analyst had predicted that McKay's lucrative contract would encourage opposing coaches to run up the score on the Buccaneers, to be able to demonstrate to their team owners that they were deserving of similar money.

Fed up with the attitude that he had to prove himself in the NFL, McKay once drunkenly needled Don Shula by saying, "I think pro coaches should have to prove themselves by winning four national championships in the colleges". He later admitted to having ruffled some feathers in the NFL, but said, "it wasn't as if they didn't deserve it".

== Other winless teams ==
Five previous teams finished with a winless and tieless season record, mostly during World War II: the 1934 Cincinnati Reds at 0–8, the 1942 Detroit Lions at 0–11, the 1943 Chicago Cardinals at 0–10, and the 1944 Brooklyn Tigers and Chicago Cardinals/Pittsburgh Steelers at 0–10 (the Cardinals and Steelers merged for the 1944 season and are commonly referred to as Card-Pitt, or, derisively, as the "carpet").

The 0–14 record was matched by the 1980 New Orleans Saints, who won their penultimate game to end the season 1–15. The 1981 Baltimore Colts then won their opener and closer, but lost every game in between to equal the Buccaneers' and Saints' 14-game single-season losing streak. The 1982 Colts were winless in a strike-shortened season, but did get a tie in one game. The 1990 New England Patriots had a 1–1 record when several of the players sexually harassed a female reporter. The fallout from the scandal contributed to the team finishing 0–14 in its remaining games. The 2013 Houston Texans also managed to match the Buccaneers' single-season losing streak after starting 2–0. The 2016 Cleveland Browns lost their first 14 games — or eighteen consecutive if an 0–4 preseason be added — to match the Buccaneers' single season streak. The Browns managed to avoid becoming the NFL's second 0–16 team by winning their penultimate game against the San Diego Chargers, but would not be so lucky in the next season when they did compile a 0–16 record.

The Buccaneers' record for consecutive games lost in a single season has been surpassed four times: by the 2001 Carolina Panthers and the 2020 Jacksonville Jaguars, both of whom lost fifteen consecutive games after winning their opener, and by the 2008 Detroit Lions, and the 2017 Cleveland Browns, the latter two being the only winless teams in a 16-game schedule. Thirteen NFL teams since the 1976 Buccaneers have lost 15 or 16 games in a season, but the Buccaneersʼ 26-game losing streak from 1976 to 1977 still stands as the longest in modern NFL history. The aforementioned Jacksonville Jaguars have come closest to equaling the Buccaneersʼ losing streak, suffering 20 consecutive losses between their second game of 2020 until finally winning the sixth game of their 2021 season. Prior to the modern era, the Chicago Cardinals still technically hold the longest losing streak in NFL history, with 29 consecutive losses from 1942 through 1945; however, in 1944 the Pittsburgh Steelers merged with the Cardinals to form the winless Card-Pitt team. As a result, the NFL considers the Card-Pitt team to be a unique franchise and therefore does not count the losing streak.

== Offseason ==
The Buccaneers signed their first-ever free agents in January: former Birmingham Americans and Nebraska guard Tom Alward, Denver Broncos and Notre Dame defensive end Pete Duranko, and Chicago Bears wide receiver Wayne Wheeler. Having not selected a quarterback in the veteran allocation draft, they addressed that need in their first-ever trade, a deal to get local favorite Steve Spurrier from the San Francisco 49ers. The former Heisman Trophy winner was obtained for a second-round draft choice and two of the veteran draftees, Bruce Elia and Willie McGee. An earlier attempt to obtain a quarterback failed when the team sent a future draft pick to the Saints for backup quarterback Larry Cipa, only to waive him when he failed his physical. The Buccaneers also used a third-round pick to obtain defensive back Mike Washington from the Baltimore Colts.

=== Coaching staff ===
Ron Wolf, who had been the Oakland Raiders' Director of Player Personnel since 1963 and was credited with much of their success, was hired as Vice President of Operations. Los Angeles Rams general manager Don Klosterman and former Kansas City Chiefs head coach Hank Stram were early candidates for the job; but Klosterman withdrew, and Stram was interested in a combined coach/general manager position. Wolf was directly responsible for the drafting of 20 of the Raiders' 22 starters, and his effectiveness at scouting talent was believed to be a major reason for the Raiders' being one of the few teams not to belong to a scouting combine. The Buccaneers quickly developed a Raiders flavor, choosing to hire a scouting staff rather than rely on the computerized scouting reports that almost all other teams were using, and hiring Raiders business manager Ken LaRue to serve in the same capacity. One of Wolf's responsibilities was to assist in the hiring of a head coach. Wolf persuaded Culverhouse that it would be better for any prospect to gain a year of experience and knowledge in his present job, rather than be named at expansion time, when there was little or no advantage to having a coach in place.

Wolf named Tom Bass director of player personnel. Bass had previously served as head of scouting and defensive coordinator for the Cincinnati Bengals, the only team apart from the Buccaneers and Raiders that still maintained a human scouting staff instead of using the computerized services, and the team on whose model the Buccaneers' expansion strategy was patterned. Bass was Paul Brown's first coaching hire with the expansion Bengals, and previously had been an assistant under Sid Gillman with the San Diego Chargers, and with Don Coryell at San Diego State. Former McKay assistant and Utah State head coach Phil Krueger was added to the staff, joined shortly thereafter by USC assistants Wayne Fontes and Willie Brown, as defensive backs and receivers coaches, respectively. Dennis Fryzel, the last University of Tampa head coach, was added to handle special teams. Denver Broncos assistant Jerry Frei was hired as offensive line coach, becoming McKay's first assistant hired from the professional ranks, and was followed by former New York Jets defensive coordinator Dick Voris, hired initially as defensive line coach. Abe Gibron, former head coach of the Chicago Bears and college teammate of McKay at Purdue, was brought on board as a defensive assistant. The staff was completed with the addition of Atlanta Falcons assistant and former Oakland Raiders and Buffalo Bills head coach John Rauch as offensive coordinator. Tampa resident Harry Smith, a trainer with experience working with local college athletes such as John Matuszak and Gary Huff, became the team's strength and conditioning coach.

=== Expansion draft ===
The list of available players was released only 72 hours before the draft, and included many medical rejects who did not even report to training camp. McKay initially felt that the draft included a higher-than-expected level of talent, joking that "they're in their late 30s. I couldn't be happier". At the time, the NFL allowed existing teams to protect all except three players on their active rosters, leaving very meager options for expansion brethren Buccaneers and Seahawks. While the expansion draft did not include many well-known starters, it included several players who had notoriety with previous professional and college teams:

- Larry Ball and Doug Swift of the undefeated 1972 Miami Dolphins team. Swift was left unprotected by the Dolphins, and the Buccaneers drafted him, unaware of the previous day's newspaper report that Swift had been accepted into medical school and would be retiring from football.
- Joe Blahak, who played for the 1971 Nebraska Cornhuskers National Championship team and caught an interception in their Orange Bowl win over Alabama.
- Former USC tailbacks Anthony Davis and Manfred Moore. Davis did not report immediately, as he was still under contract to the Toronto Argonauts of the Canadian Football League.
- Starting San Diego Chargers guard Ira Gordon.
- Howard Fest, a member of the Cincinnati Bengals 1968 expansion team.
- Harold Hart, the Oakland Raiders running back who had led the AFC in kick returns the previous season.
- Vince Kendrick, the former Florida Gators fullback who had been left unprotected by the Atlanta Falcons due to a knee injury.
- J. K. McKay, former USC wide receiver and son of coach McKay. McKay and Anthony Davis also both played with the Southern California Sun of the World Football League before joining the NFL.
- Dave Pear, who would become the first Buccaneer selected as an All-Pro and would later win a Super Bowl ring with Oakland before retiring and becoming an anti-NFL activist over the league's treatment of injured and disabled former players.
- Pat Toomay, the Buffalo Bills' defensive line MVP and former Dallas Cowboy, who he believed was placed on the expansion list as a form of blackballing due to the publication of his novel The Crunch, noting in a 2014 Sports Illustrated article that the novel "was the kind of thing you write AFTER you retire, not while you're still playing".
- Mike Current and Ken Stone, who would go on to have productive careers with the Dolphins and Cardinals, respectively.
- Mark Cotney and Dave Reavis, who went on to become key starters for the Buccaneers. Cotney said in 2014 that the 1976 team taught him the most of any Bucs team in the nine years he was a starter at safety, because "we had eight or nine guys that year who belonged in the NFL...you still had to find a way to go out there and bust your ass."

=== NFL draft ===
The 1976 NFL draft was considered to be the worst draft class in many years, with only eight high-quality prospects, as compared to the normal 27 or 28. The popularity of the wishbone offense among college teams left the draft devoid of quarterback prospects: indeed the 1976 quarterback draft class is retrospectively viewed as amongst the worst of all time. A drawing held the previous December gave the Buccaneers the rights to the first overall selection.

1976 Tampa Bay Buccaneers draft
Round	Pick	Player	Position	College	Notes
1	1	Lee Roy Selmon * ^{†}	DE	Oklahoma	
2	30	Jimmy DuBose	RB	Florida	
2	60	Dewey Selmon	LB	Oklahoma	
3	61	Steve Young	T	Colorado	
3	91	Steve Maughan	LB	Utah State	
4	121	Richard Appleby	WR	Georgia	
4	124	Everett Little	G	Houston	
5	125	Michael Kelson	DB	West Texas State	
5	154	Steve Wilson	T	Georgia	
6	158	Curtis Jordan	DB	Texas Tech	
7	183	Parnell Dickinson	QB	Mississippi Valley State	
9	238	Bruce Welch	G	Texas A&M	
10	267	Sid Smith	LB	BYU	
11	292	Melvin Washington	DB	Colorado State	
12	321	George Ragsdale	RB	North Carolina A&T	
13	348	Brad Jenkins	TE	Nebraska	
14	377	Carl Roaches *	WR	Texas A&M	
15	404	Bob Dzierzak	DT	Utah State	
16	433	Tommy West	LB	Tennessee	
17	460	Jack Berry	QB	Washington and Lee	
Made roster † Pro Football Hall of Fame * Made at least one Pro Bowl during career

==== Draft trades ====
As an expansion team, the Buccaneers were given two extra picks in each of the 2nd–5th rounds. Their second 2nd-round pick was traded to the San Francisco 49ers for quarterback Steve Spurrier. Their first 3rd-round pick was traded to Baltimore for cornerback Mike Washington. Their first 4th-round pick and last 5th-round picks were traded to the Los Angeles Rams for linebacker Jim Peterson. Their 8th-round pick was traded to the New York Jets for linebacker Steve Reese.

==== Draft selections ====
With the first selection in the draft, the Buccaneers picked Lee Roy Selmon, considered to be the best defensive tackle in Oklahoma history and described by coach McKay as "one of the greatest defensive linemen I have ever watched". Shortly thereafter, with their second pick of the second round, they took his brother Dewey. The two, who were the two leading tacklers on the 1975 Oklahoma Sooners football team, were the third pair of brothers in NFL history to go to the same team in the same draft. They became the only pair of brothers to play for the same NFL team at the same time until Lyle Blackwood joined his brother Glenn on the Miami Dolphins' roster in 1981. The move prompted brother Lucious Selmon to offer to come out of retirement if Tampa Bay would obtain his NFL rights. The Buccaneers spent their first second-round pick on Florida fullback Jimmy DuBose, and took Colorado offensive tackle Steve Young in the third round. Later-round picks who made the team included defensive back Curtis Jordan, quarterback Parnell Dickinson, and running back George Ragsdale. Carl Roaches, later a Pro Bowl return man for the Houston Oilers, and Tommy West, later the head coach at Clemson and the University of Memphis, were selected by the Buccaneers but did not make the roster.

== Preseason ==
The Buccaneers' first training camp began on July 6, at the team's training facility near Tampa International Airport, with a crew from NFL Films on hand to film the proceedings. Chicago Bears quarterback and Tampa native Gary Huff showed up to taunt the receivers. McKay noted that many of the players were out of shape, and expressed surprise at players who he felt were not taking advantage of a big opportunity. Ron Wolf, after seeing the team's players in action, admitted disappointment at his own efforts in assembling the team. Defensive coordinator Abe Gibron, who promised to be honest with each player about his performance and told one that he had a chance of making the team, but that "You're built like Tarzan, but you run like Jane", assessed the defense as having the makings of a great front four. The team's smallest, and perhaps fastest, player was Carl Roaches, who at 5'6 1/2" and 165 pounds, could run the 100-yard dash in 9.5 seconds. The team's strongest player was fitness fanatic Dave Pear, who could bench press 10 repetitions at 400 pounds. McKay was unimpressed with the candidates at backup quarterback, saying of one injured contender, "his hand is still bad, but his passing is worse". Middle linebacker soon proved to be a position for which there were no quality candidates in camp. Running back George Ragsdale impressed the coaches, but broke his wrist in training camp. Essex Johnson, the Cincinnati Bengals' all-time leading rusher and one of three remaining original Bengals, was obtained for "undisclosed considerations".

The (as McKay liked to point out, undefeated) team made their game debut against the Los Angeles Rams in an exhibition at the Los Angeles Coliseum on July 31, losing 26–3. McKay called the players' performance "unaggressive, uninspiring, lethargic, and unacceptable", and cut 15 players one day prior to the following Tuesday's cutdown date. McKay was pleased with the following week's improved performance against the Green Bay Packers, a 10–6 loss in which a late interception of a Parnell Dickinson pass prevented a likely Buccaneer victory. After the Packers referred to them as the "Tampa Buccaneers", the Buccaneers threatened to introduce the "Green Packers" at their next meeting. The Buccaneers' first victory came in a 17–3 preseason win over the favored Atlanta Falcons, in which they scored on runs by Steve Spurrier and Essex Johnson, and a Mirro Roder field goal. Although the win had no official significance, it raised optimism among fans, particularly due to the team's defensive performance. McKay himself was puzzled, unsure whether the win was due to a superior performance by Tampa Bay, or a lack of effort by the Falcons. Their home debut came in a 28–21 loss to the Miami Dolphins, in front of a crowd of 71,718, a crowd which Dolphins owner Joe Robbie said proved his longtime prediction that a Bay Area team would be a success.

The late preseason saw a wave of signings of players cut by other teams, particularly the Bengals and Colts. Signees included Isaac Hagins, Danny Reece, Dave Green, and Jack Novak, with Ira Gordon and camp standout Jim Cagle among those waived to make roster space for them. Running back Charlie Davis was also obtained via trade. The moves left the team with nine former Bengals on their roster, a situation they expected, as they knew that Bengals owner Paul Brown had more young talent than he would be able to keep on his team. Linebacker Richard Wood was obtained from the New York Jets for a future draft choice, with injury-plagued running back Harold Hart placed on injured reserve to make roster space for him. Wood was the final roster addition of the preseason, and became the fifth ex-USC player on the roster.

== Regular season ==
According to coach McKay, the team's progress was set back as they spent the preseason trying to find out which veterans would develop into regulars, but found that the younger players were better. This meant that the team started over from the beginning as the regular season began. The tone for the season seemed to be set as the team got lost in the Houston Astrodome when leaving the locker room to take the field for their opening game. They spent 20 minutes trying to find their way out, and barely made it to the field in time for the opening kickoff. The team started out with solid defensive play, ranking in the top 10 until injuries began to set in. They began to wear out as the Buccaneers' offensive ineptitude meant that the defense spent a lot of time on the field, over 100 plays in some games. Receiver Johnny McKay pointed out the tendency of the offense to feel pressured after a three-and-out possession, with the result that they would press even harder the next time, quickly going three-and-out again. Coach McKay said early on that controlling the ball for 40 percent of the game, as they were, was not long enough to win. Placekicker Mirro Roder was cut after missing three field goals in the first two games, in both of which the Buccaneers were shut out, giving their offense the nickname "Zero Gang", which stuck with them through a total of eleven shutouts before their first victory as a franchise.

Roder was not replaced, with punter Dave Green taking over his duties. Rick Jennings spent the shortest amount of time with the club of all players that season; picked up on waivers from the Raiders on a Tuesday, he was released the same Thursday. New uniforms had to be ordered for the team when it was discovered that the fans could not tell the players apart because the numerals on the white uniforms could not be seen from the stands. Many local Miami Dolphins fans were angered when the NFL upheld the Buccaneers' demand that Dolphin games not be broadcast in the Tampa Bay area on days that the Buccaneers play at home. The timing of the decision led to the firing of Director of Administration Curt Mosher after the season.

The team failed to throw a touchdown pass in any of their first five games, three of which were shutout losses. Offensive coordinator John Rauch walked out on the team during the week 5 game against Cincinnati, and gave 'personal differences' as the reason for his resignation. His duties were taken over by McKay, who pointed to the increased effectiveness of the team's "simpler" offense, saying that they were no longer "trying to do all the things people said you have to do in this league". On a strange NFL weekend in which O. J. Simpson was ejected from a game for fighting, the Chicago Bears lost a game due to a referee's inadvertent whistle, and Minnesota Vikings receiver Sammy White fumbled away a touchdown due to starting his celebration before entering the end zone, McKay launched an obscenity-filled tirade against Denver Broncos coach John Ralston after a blowout loss. McKay admitted that his feelings dated back to their college rivalry, when McKay coached at USC and Ralston coached at Stanford University, but pointed to specific plays such as a reverse and a last-minute punt return as evidence that Ralston was trying to run up the score. Third-string running back Manfred Moore caught a lucky break when, waived after the week 13 game against the Pittsburgh Steelers, he was picked up by the Oakland Raiders as an injury replacement for ex-Buccaneer Rick Jennings. He wound up going from an 0–13 team to the eventual Super Bowl champion. Players began to meet for postgame parties at Steve Spurrier's house, in order to avoid having to show their faces in public. According to defensive end Pat Toomay, "By the time we got to the last game of the season, we had so many injuries that we didn't feel we had much of a chance. Everybody was so sick of the season that they showed up packed and ready to get out of town. It looked like a bunch of Okies fleeing the dust bowl." McKay said that the week 4 game against the Baltimore Colts summed up the season: "On one play I looked up and one of our guys was getting kicked out of the game, and two more were getting carried off".

The team did not score a touchdown until cornerback Danny Reece returned a fumble 44 yards in the fourth game. Running back Louis Carter threw their first touchdown pass in an "Expansion Bowl" loss to the Seattle Seahawks in which the two teams combined for 310 yards in penalties. They were outscored 412–125, allowed 6.7 yards per play, and allowed an average of 183 rushing yards per game.

Several factors contributed to the Buccaneers' record. One was the stinginess of owner Culverhouse, who went so far as to lease the team jet from McCulloch (the chainsaw manufacturer) Airlines. At times Culverhouse had to pay for fuel with his own credit card, because of McCulloch's financial difficulties. The offense was able to move the ball freely at times, but had difficulty getting the ball into the end zone. McKay and Spurrier had a difficult relationship, with Spurrier at times taking public potshots at McKay. Frustrated by the lack of quality receivers, Spurrier criticized McKay for playing his own son Johnny ahead of receivers Spurrier considered more capable. Coach McKay, for his part, questioned (rightly, according to Spurrier himself) Spurrier's drive, although he publicly defended Spurrier by terming fans who booed him "idiots". Spurrier was not the only player angered over the younger McKay's retention, and Pat Toomay later alleged that Spurrier would throw passes over the middle to McKay in an attempt to get him injured, but that McKay made no effort to catch them. Injuries were a large factor. Only five Buccaneers started all 14 games, and neither of the team's projected starting running backs, Harold Hart and Vince Kendrick, ever played a regular-season down for the team. The defense, who played the equivalent of two seasons in one due to the inability of the offense to mount sustained drives, was hit particularly hard by injuries. Toward the end of the year, the roster became so thin that the team signed undersized ex-USC linebacker Jimmie "Psycho" Sims straight off the streets. With no time to learn the system, Sims was simply instructed to blitz on every down. Finally, the losing was in part by design: McKay was determined to give experience to young players who he felt could help the team in the future, rather than obtain veterans who might help the team win a few games in the short run, but who would no longer be around by the time the team would develop into a championship contender.

The 2008 NFL Network program "10 Worst Teams of All Time" (produced prior to the Lions' winless season) recognized the 1976 Buccaneers as the worst NFL team ever, although it is disputed whether their record was not deceptive, as they were decimated by injuries and were a play away from victory several times. There is some opinion that the 1976 team was not even the worst in Buccaneers history, with the 2–14 1986 squad deserving of that distinction.

The last remaining active member of the 1976 Tampa Bay Buccaneers was defensive back Curtis Jordan, who retired after the 1986 season.

=== Schedule ===
Week	Date	Opponent	Result	Record	Venue	Attendance	Recap
1	September 12	at Houston Oilers	**L** 0–20	0–1	Astrodome	42,228	Recap
2	September 19	**San Diego Chargers**	**L** 0–23	0–2	Tampa Stadium	39,558	Recap
3	September 26	Buffalo Bills	**L** 9–14	0–3	Tampa Stadium	44,505	Recap
4	October 3	at Baltimore Colts	**L** 17–42	0–4	Memorial Stadium	40,053	Recap
5	October 10	at Cincinnati Bengals	**L** 0–21	0–5	Riverfront Stadium	40,700	Recap
6	October 17	Seattle Seahawks	**L** 10–13	0–6	Tampa Stadium	43,458	Recap
7	October 24	Miami Dolphins	**L** 20–23	0–7	Tampa Stadium	61,437	Recap
8	October 31	**Kansas City Chiefs**	**L** 19–28	0–8	Tampa Stadium	41,779	Recap
9	November 7	at **Denver Broncos**	**L** 13–48	0–9	Mile High Stadium	61,703	Recap
10	November 14	at New York Jets	**L** 0–34	0–10	Shea Stadium	46,427	Recap
11	November 21	Cleveland Browns	**L** 7–24	0–11	Tampa Stadium	36,930	Recap
12	November 28	at **Oakland Raiders**	**L** 16–49	0–12	Oakland–Alameda County Coliseum	49,590	Recap
13	December 5	at Pittsburgh Steelers	**L** 0–42	0–13	Three Rivers Stadium	43,385	Recap
14	December 12	New England Patriots	**L** 14–31	0–14	Tampa Stadium	41,517	Recap
Note: Intra-division opponents are in **bold** text.

== Personnel ==
=== Roster ===
1976 Tampa Bay Buccaneers roster
Quarterbacks (QB): 5 Terry Hanratty; 11 Steve Spurrier; Running backs (RB): 32 Louis Carter; 35 Jimmy DuBose; 19 Essex Johnson; 22 Rod McNeill; 43 Ed Williams; Wide receivers (WR): 84 Freddie Douglas; 81 Rick Jennings; 89 J. K. McKay; 85 Morris Owens; 86 Barry Smith; Tight ends (TE): 86 Bob Moore; 80 Jack Novak; 82 Fred Pagac	Offensive linemen (OL): 67 Tom Alward G; 74 Mike Current T; 72 Howard Fest G; 77 Everett Little T; 51 Dan Ryczek C; 79 Steve Wilson G; 70 Randy Young T; 71 Steve Young T; Defensive linemen (DL): 69 Ed McAleney DE; 65 Maulty Moore DT; 76 Dave Pear DT; 64 Glenn Robinson DE; 78 Council Rudolph DE; 61 Dewey Selmon DT; 66 Pat Toomay DE	Linebackers (LB): 53 Larry Ball OLB; 30 Jimmy Gunn OLB; 59 Mike Lemon MLB; 52 Steve Reese MLB; 55 Jimmy Sims OLB; 54 Richard Wood OLB; Defensive backs (DB): 34 Cedric Brown FS; 33 Mark Cotney SS; 27 Ricky Davis FS; 25 Curtis Jordan CB; 21 Don Martin SS; 20 Reggie Pierson CB; 28 Ken Stone FS; 24 Roscoe Word CB; Special teams (ST): 4 Dave Green P/K	Reserve: 56 Bert Cooper LB (IR); 26 Charlie Davis RB (IR); 18 Parnell Dickinson QB (IR); 36 Charlie Evans RB (IR); 62 Tim Guy DE (IR); 81 Isaac Hagins WR (IR); 34 Harold Hart RB (IR); 50 Steve Maughan LB (IR); 58 Cal Peterson LB (IR); 57 Jim Peterson LB (IR); 23 George Ragsdale RB (IR); 75 Dave Reavis T (IR); 46 Danny Reece CB (IR); 90 Steadman Scavella LB (IR); 63 Lee Roy Selmon DT (IR); 40 Mike Washington CB (IR); 56 Brad Watson LB (IR); Rookies in italics 45 active, 17 reserve

=== Coaching staff ===
1976 Tampa Bay Buccaneers staff
Front office: Owner – Hugh Culverhouse; General manager – Ron Wolf; Head coaches: Head coach – John McKay; Offensive coaches: Offensive coordinator/quarterbacks – John Rauch; Offensive backs – Phil Krueger; Wide receivers – Willie Brown; Offensive line – Jerry Frei	Defensive coaches: Defensive coordinator/defensive line – Abe Gibron; Linebackers – Dick Voris; Linebackers – Tom Bass; Secondary – Wayne Fontes; Special teams coaches: Special teams coordinator – Dennis Fryzel; Strength and conditioning: Strength – Harry Smith

== Standings ==
AFC West
	W	L	T	PCT	DIV	CONF	PF	PA	STK
^{(1)} Oakland Raiders	13	1	0	.929	7–0	10–1	350	237	W10
Denver Broncos	9	5	0	.643	5–2	7–5	315	206	W2
San Diego Chargers	6	8	0	.429	2–5	4–8	248	285	L1
Kansas City Chiefs	5	9	0	.357	2–5	4–8	290	376	W1
Tampa Bay Buccaneers	0	14	0	.000	0–4	0–13	125	412	L14

== Game summaries ==
=== Week 1: at Houston Oilers ===
Week One: Tampa Bay Buccaneers at Houston Oilers – Game summary

Quarter	1	2	3	4	Total
Buccaneers	0	0	0	0	0
Oilers	0	7	3	10	20

at Astrodome, Houston, Texas

- Date: September 12
- Game time: 2:00 p.m. EDT / 1:00 p.m. CDT
- Game weather: None (played indoors)
- Game attendance: 42,228
- Referee: Don Wedge
- Box score

Game information

First quarter

- No scoring plays

Second quarter

- HOU – Fred Willis 13-yard pass from Dan Pastorini (Skip Butler kick). Oilers 7–0.

Third quarter

- HOU – Skip Butler 33-yard field goal. Oilers 10–0.

Fourth quarter

- HOU – Ken Burrough 42-yard pass from Dan Pastorini (Skip Butler kick). Oilers 17–0.
- HOU – Skip Butler 44-yard field goal. Oilers 20–0.

Top passers

- TB – Steve Spurrier – 8/21, 90 yards
- HOU – Dan Pastorini – 17/27, 194 yards, 2 TD, INT

Top rushers

- TB – Essex Johnson – 5 rushes, 15 yards
- HOU – Ronnie Coleman – 25 rushes, 142 yards

Top receivers

- TB – John McKay Jr. – 3 receptions, 49 yards
- HOU – Ken Burrough – 5 receptions, 92 yards, TD

The Buccaneers, making their NFL debut against the Houston Oilers, averaged less than two yards per offensive play. They were unable to score despite being given good field position by two Oiler fumbles. Steve Spurrier completed 8 of 21 passes for 36 yards, and starting running backs Jimmy DuBose and Louis Carter rushed for 12 yards on 15 carries. Despite being outgained 169 to 8 by the second quarter, they were only behind 7–0 and missed a chance to tie the score when Lee McGriff dropped a Spurrier pass in the end zone. A later drive ended when Spurrier overthrew John McKay, Jr., instead hitting defender C.L. Whittington. A third chance to tie the score was lost when Mark Cotney dropped an interception of a Dan Pastorini pass with a clear path to the end zone. Whittington gave the Buccaneers the ball on the Oiler 11-yard line by fumbling a punt, but then killed the Buccaneers' scoring chances by intercepting another Spurrier pass. Ronnie Coleman ran 25 times for 142 yards for the Oilers. McKay expressed concern over the team's offense after the defeat, and responded to a reporter's taunt of "I thought you said you were going to win some games?" by saying, "Houston has been in the league 6,000 years and still hasn't won a championship. The Bucs will be heard from". It was a day with a bad beginning, middle, and ending for the Buccaneers. The day began with the Buccaneers getting lost in the maze-like Astrodome interior, and ended with the team's charter plane bouncing and rolling before righting itself on landing. In addition, starting tackle Dave Reavis was injured during pregame warmups and was lost for the season.

=== Week 2: vs San Diego Chargers ===
Week Two: San Diego Chargers at Tampa Bay Buccaneers – Game summary

Quarter	1	2	3	4	Total
Chargers	3	3	0	17	23
Buccaneers	0	0	0	0	0

at Tampa Stadium, Tampa, Florida

- Date: September 19
- Game time: 1:00 p.m. EDT
- Game weather: 77 °F (25 °C)
- Game attendance: 39,558
- Referee: Fred Wyant
- TV announcers (NBC): Jay Randolph and Floyd Little

Game information

First quarter

- SD – Toni Fritsch 48-yard field goal. Chargers 3–0.

Second quarter

- SD – Toni Fritsch 48-yard field goal. Chargers 6–0.

Third quarter

- No scoring plays

Fourth quarter

- SD – Toni Fritsch 22-yard field goal. Chargers 9–0.
- SD – Rickey Young 46-yard run (Toni Fritsch kick). Chargers 16–0.
- SD – Tom Hayes 37-yard interception return (Toni Fritsch kick). Chargers 23–0.

Top passers

- SD – Dan Fouts – 14/21, 154 yards
- TB – Steve Spurrier – 3/10, 13 yards

Top rushers

- SD – Rickey Young – 13 rushes, 85 yards, TD
- TB – Parnell Dickinson – 3 receptions, 54 yards

Top receivers

- SD – Charlie Joiner – 3 receptions, 59 yards
- TB – Bob Moore – 2 receptions, 17 yards

The San Diego Chargers got 16 first downs, compared to 5 for the Buccaneers. Chargers players and coaches praised the Buccaneers' defense, who held them to 9 points until the final three minutes of the game, saying that they played the equivalent of five quarters. Three Tampa Bay quarterbacks completed a combined 3 of 8 passes for −4 yards. Buccaneers receiver Bob Moore said, "We're at rock bottom now...but if we start pointing a finger, we'll go 0–14". The Chargers finished with 325 yards of offense to the Buccaneers' 125. Inconsistent blocking was blamed for the offensive problems, a situation that was not helped by the injury to tackle Dave Reavis. After playing for the Miami Dolphins in their preseason game against the Buccaneers and then being picked up on waivers by the Chargers, Mercury Morris commented that the difference in Buccaneers' offensive line protection between the two games was like watching two different teams. The Buccaneers' lack of speed was also noticeable. The loss marked the first time since 1961 that a professional football team was shut out in the first two games of the season, when the Oakland Raiders were shut out by the same two teams in the same order.

=== Week 3: vs Buffalo Bills ===
Week Three: Buffalo Bills at Tampa Bay Buccaneers – Game summary

Quarter	1	2	3	4	Total
Bills	0	7	0	7	14
Buccaneers	6	0	0	3	9

at Tampa Stadium, Tampa, Florida

- Date: September 26
- Game time: 1:00 p.m. EDT
- Game weather: 80 °F (26.7 °C)
- Game attendance: 44,505
- Referee: Bernie Ulman
- Box score

Game information

First quarter

- TB – Dave Green 39-yard field goal. Buccaneers 3–0.
- TB – Dave Green 24-yard field goal. Buccaneers 6–0.

Second quarter

- BUF – Bob Chandler 58-yard pass from Joe Ferguson (Benny Ricardo kick). Bills 7–6.

Third quarter

- No scoring plays

Fourth quarter

- TB – Dave Green 19-yard field goal. Buccaneers 9–7.
- BUF – Reuben Gant 15-yard pass from Joe Ferguson (Benny Ricardo kick). Bills 14–9.

Top passers

- BUF – Joe Ferguson – 12/22, 188 yards, 2 TD
- TB – Steve Spurrier – 13/27, 170 yards, INT

Top rushers

- BUF – Jeff Kinney – 12 rushes, 62 yards
- TB – Louis Carter – 12 rushes, 72 yards

Top receivers

- BUF – Bob Chandler – 5 receptions, 110 yards, TD
- TB – Bob Moore – 4 receptions, 65 yards

The Buccaneers scored their first points, but were not able to score enough to win, despite statistically outperforming the Buffalo Bills in most phases of the game. The Buccaneers had only three Dave Green field goals to show for seven possessions inside the Bills' 22-yard line. O. J. Simpson, who would rush for a season total of 1,503 yards, was held to only 39 yards on twenty carries. The Bills, the highest-scoring team in recent years, were 1 of 12 in third-down conversions, and were surpassed in yardage, first downs, rushing average, and number of total plays. Buffalo took the lead on Bob Chandler's 58-yard reception of a tipped pass. The Buccaneers' 338 yards of offense, a great improvement over their previous two games, coincided with coach McKay's relenting to Steve Spurrier's demands that he be able to call his own plays. Spurrier suffered a bone chip in his throwing hand that made his status questionable for the next week's game.

=== Week 4: at Baltimore Colts ===
Week Four: Tampa Bay Buccaneers at Baltimore Colts – Game summary

Quarter	1	2	3	4	Total
Buccaneers	0	3	0	14	17
Colts	0	24	9	9	42

at Memorial Stadium, Baltimore, Maryland

- Date: October 3
- Game time: 2:00 p.m. EDT
- Game weather: 60 °F (15.6 °C)
- Game attendance: 40,053
- Referee: Gordon McCarter
- Box score

Game information

First quarter

- TB – Dave Green 40-yard field goal. Buccaneers 3–0.

Second quarter

- BAL – Roosevelt Leaks 1-yard run (Toni Linhart kick). Colts 7–3.
- BAL – Toni Linhart 32-yard field goal. Colts 10–3.
- BAL – Roosevelt Leaks 1-yard run (Toni Linhart kick). Colts 17–3.
- BAL – Roger Carr 48-yard pass from Bert Jones (Toni Linhart kick). Colts 24–3.

Third quarter

- BAL – Lydell Mitchell 24-yard pass from Bert Jones (kick failed). Colts 30–3.
- BAL – Toni Linhart 38-yard field goal. Colts 33–3.

Fourth quarter

- BAL – Don McCauley 2-yard run (Toni Linhart kick). Colts 40–3.
- BAL – Parnell Dickinson tackled in end zone for a safety. Colts 42–3.
- TB – Danny Reece 44-yard fumble return (Dave Green kick). Colts 42–10.
- TB – Charlie Davis 1-yard run (Dave Green kick). Colts 42–17.

Top passers

- TB – Steve Spurrier – 2/9, 36 yards
- BAL – Bert Jones – 15/24, 186 yards, 2 TD

Top rushers

- TB – Louis Carter – 12 rushes, 35 yards
- BAL – Lydell Mitchell – 14 rushes, 98 yards

Top receivers

- TB – Barry Smith – 1 reception, 39 yards
- BAL – Roger Carr – 2 receptions, 54 yards, TD

After taking a 3–0 lead against one of the league's better teams on a Dave Green field goal, the Buccaneers were overwhelmed by the Baltimore Colts in a disastrous second quarter. A Danny Reece interception of a Bert Jones pass was called back due to a roughing-the-passer penalty, and another was dropped by Richard Wood. Cornerback Mike Washington was thrown out of the game for fighting. Cal Peterson and Lee Roy Selmon went out with knee injuries. Film of the game appeared to indicate that the injury to Selmon was intentional. The Colts followed with 9 points in each of the next two-quarters. The Buccaneers finally scored their first two touchdowns of the year, a fumble return by Danny Reece and a 1-yard Charlie Davis run. The Colts set team records with eight sacks, and with 124 penalty yards. They outgained Tampa Bay 458 yards to 89 and 31 first downs to 6. The Buccaneers were only able to complete four passes; wide receiver Lee McGriff was their leading passer with a 39-yard completion. Said McKay afterward, "Field position hurt us badly, dropped passes hurt us badly, no blocking hurt us badly, injuries hurt us badly, and penalties hurt us badly. Otherwise, it was a perfect afternoon."

=== Week 5: at Cincinnati Bengals ===
Week Five: Tampa Bay Buccaneers at Cincinnati Bengals – Game summary

Quarter	1	2	3	4	Total
Buccaneers	0	0	0	0	0
Bengals	14	0	7	0	21

at Riverfront Stadium, Cincinnati, Ohio

- Date: October 10
- Game time: 1:00 p.m. EDT
- Game weather: 47 °F (8.3 °C)
- Game attendance: 40,700
- Referee: Dick Jorgensen
- Box score

Game information

First quarter

- CIN – Bob Trumpy 10-yard pass from Ken Anderson (Chris Bahr kick). Bengals 7–0.
- CIN – Boobie Clark 3-yard run (Chris Bahr kick). Bengals 14–0.

Second quarter

- No scoring plays

Third quarter

- CIN – Tommy Casanova 25-yard fumble return (Chris Bahr kick). Bengals 21–0.

Fourth quarter

- No scoring plays

Top passers

- TB – Steve Spurrier – 12/22, 122 yards, 2 INT
- CIN – Ken Anderson – 10/15, 98 yards, TD

Top rushers

- TB – Charlie Davis – 16 rushes, 40 yards
- CIN – Lenvil Elliott – 12 rushes, 60 yards

Top receivers

- TB – Morris Owens – 4 receptions, 62 yards
- CIN – Billy Brooks – 3 receptions, 37 yards

With four defensive starters out with injuries, the Buccaneers spotted the Cincinnati Bengals a 14–0 first-quarter lead. The defense came together for the last three-quarters, with the only points coming from Tommy Casanova's 25-yard fumble return for a touchdown. Ken Anderson, the AFC's leading passer, was held to 98 yards passing. Lacking healthy linebackers, the Buccaneers abandoned their 3–4 defense in favor of a 4–3. The Buccaneers held a 191–174 yardage advantage over the AFC Central-leading Bengals in the final 45 minutes. The Bengals declined to hand out game balls to any of their players after the win.

=== Week 6: vs Seattle Seahawks ===
Week Six: Seattle Seahawks at Tampa Bay Buccaneers – Game summary

Quarter	1	2	3	4	Total
Seahawks	0	13	0	0	13
Buccaneers	3	0	7	0	10

at Tampa Stadium, Tampa, Florida

- Date: October 17
- Game time: 1:00 p.m. EDT
- Game weather: 78 °F (25.6 °C)
- Game attendance: 43,458
- Referee: Ben Dreith
- TV announcers (CBS): Jim Thacker and Tom Matte
- Box score

Game information

First quarter

- TB – Dave Green 38-yard field goal. Buccaneers 3–0.

Second quarter

- SEA – Sam McCullum 15-yard pass from Jim Zorn (John Leypoldt kick). Seahawks 7–3.
- SEA – John Leypoldt 25-yard field goal. Seahawks 10–3.
- SEA – John Leypoldt 39-yard field goal. Seahawks 13–3.

Third quarter

- TB – Morris Owens 1-yard pass from Louis Carter (Dave Green kick). Seahawks 13–10.

Fourth quarter

- No scoring plays

Top passers

- SEA – Jim Zorn – 11/27, 167 yards, TD, INT
- TB – Steve Spurrier – 18/30, 170 yards

Top rushers

- SEA – Sherman Smith – 10 rushes, 45 yards
- TB – Louis Carter – 15 rushes, 66 yards

Top receivers

- SEA – Sam McCullum – 5 receptions, 64 yards, TD
- TB – Ed Williams – 4 receptions, 42 yards

Seattle Seahawks linebacker Mike Curtis blocked a field goal that would have sent the game into overtime, guaranteeing a Seahawk victory in what was billed as the "expansion bowl" meeting between two winless, first-year teams. The Buccaneers outgained the Seahawks, 285 yards to 253, but the officials outgained both, with 310 yards in penalties. The 35 penalties (accepted, 41 were thrown by the officials) were two short of the 25-year-old league record. Each team was penalized for holding eight times. Defensive tackle Pat Toomay complained that "the officials made us look like a bunch of idiots". Dan Ryczek was the only Buccaneer lineman not to be called for holding. Tampa Bay running back Louis Carter, stuffed at the goal line, threw the ball to Morris Owens, who dived into the end zone for the first Buccaneer passing touchdown. A tackle by Seahawk punter Rick Engles prevented a touchdown return by Danny Reece that would have won the game for the Buccaneers. An earlier field goal try was blocked by Lyle Blackwood. The game ended with Dave Brown being helped from the field after being hit in the eye by the final penalty flag.

=== Week 7: vs Miami Dolphins ===
Week Seven: Miami Dolphins at Tampa Bay Buccaneers – Game summary

Quarter	1	2	3	4	Total
Dolphins	3	14	3	3	23
Buccaneers	7	0	6	7	20

at Tampa Stadium, Tampa, Florida

- Date: October 24
- Game time: 4:00 p.m. EDT
- Game weather: 70 °F (21.1 °C)
- Game attendance: 61,437
- Referee: Fred Wyant
- Box score

Game information

First quarter

- MIA – Garo Yepremian 28-yard field goal. Dolphins 3–0.
- TB – Morris Owens 18-yard pass from Parnell Dickinson (Dave Green kick). Buccaneers 7–3.

Second quarter

- MIA – Benny Malone 6-yard run (Garo Yepremian kick). Dolphins 10–7.
- MIA – Don Nottingham 1-yard run (Garo Yepremian kick). Dolphins 17–7.

Third quarter

- MIA – Garo Yepremian 24-yard field goal. Dolphins 20–7.
- TB – Morris Owens 20-yard pass from Steve Spurrier (kick blocked). Dolphins 20–13.

Fourth quarter

- TB – Morris Owens 7-yard pass from Steve Spurrier (Dave Green kick). Tied 20–20.
- MIA – Garo Yepremian 29-yard field goal. Dolphins 23–20.

Top passers

- MIA – Bob Griese – 8/15, 132 yards, INT
- TB – Steve Spurrier – 13/21, 143 yards, 2 TD, INT

Top rushers

- MIA – Benny Malone – 22 rushes, 118 yards, TD
- TB – Louis Carter – 15 rushes, 51 yards

Top receivers

- MIA – Nat Moore – 2 receptions, 36 yards
- TB – Morris Owens – 6 receptions, 88 yards, 3 TD

A blocked field goal and extra-point attempt provided the margin of victory for the Miami Dolphins. Ex-Dolphin receiver Morris Owens came back to haunt his old team with three touchdown catches. Starting quarterback Parnell Dickinson threw the first, then was replaced by recently acquired quarterback Terry Hanratty after injuring his ankle. When Hanratty proved ineffective, Steve Spurrier, who had not practiced during the week due to a swollen knee, came off the bench to throw the final two touchdowns. It took a final-minute, 29-yard Garo Yepremian field goal to clinch the game for the Dolphins, whose pass defense had been decimated by injuries. 192 of the Buccaneers' 334 total yards came through the air. McKay would later point to this game as the high point of the Buccaneers' season. Dolphins linebacker Nick Buoniconti saw it differently, calling the narrow victory "a disgrace" and "the low point in Miami Dolphins' history".

=== Week 8: vs Kansas City Chiefs ===
Week Eight: Kansas City Chiefs at Tampa Bay Buccaneers – Game summary

Quarter	1	2	3	4	Total
Chiefs	3	3	14	8	28
Buccaneers	0	0	0	19	19

at Tampa Stadium, Tampa, Florida

- Date: October 31
- Game time: 1:00 p.m. EST
- Game weather: 70 °F (21.1 °C)
- Game attendance: 41,779
- Referee: Gene Barth
- TV announcers (NBC): Jay Randolph and Mike Haffner
- Box score

Game information

First quarter

- KC – Jan Stenerud 42-yard field goal. Chiefs 3–0.

Second quarter

- KC – Jan Stenerud 32-yard field goal. Chiefs 6–0.

Third quarter

- KC – Billy Masters 2-yard pass from Mike Livingston (Jan Stenerud kick). Chiefs 13–0.
- KC – Walter White 2-yard pass from Mike Livingston (Jan Stenerud kick). Chiefs 20–0.

Fourth quarter

- TB – John McKay Jr. 8-yard pass from Steve Spurrier (kick failed). Chiefs 20–6.
- KC – MacArthur Lane 2-yard run (kick failed). Chiefs 26–6.
- TB – Essex Johnson 1-yard run (kick failed). Chiefs 26–12.
- TB – Jack Novak 30-yard pass from Steve Spurrier (Dave Green kick). Chiefs 26–19.
- KC – John Lohmeyer tackled Mike Current in end zone for a safety. Chiefs 28–19.

Top passers

- KC – Mike Livingston – 17/30, 183 yards, 2 TD, 2 INT
- TB – Steve Spurrier – 20/36, 212 yards, 2 TD

Top rushers

- KC – Tommy Reamon – 18 rushes, 60 yards
- TB – Jimmy DuBose – 4 rushes, 12 yards

Top receivers

- KC – Walter White – 3 receptions, 42 yards, TD
- TB – Essex Johnson – 8 receptions, 85 yards

The Kansas City Chiefs credited their defense with the win after holding the Buccaneers to 14 yards rushing. The Buccaneers managed only 2 first downs and 34 yards of total offense before exploding for three touchdowns in the final ten minutes. The Buccaneers were mistake-prone and ineffective throughout the first three-quarters. Ken Stone was penalized for roughing on a missed field goal in the first quarter, with the result that the Chiefs got a second chance to kick it. The special teams allowed Henry Marshall to return a punt 59 yards, setting up the Chiefs' second touchdown. They got 14 first downs and 162 yards in the final 15 minutes, scoring on an Essex Johnson run and passes from Steve Spurrier to Johnny McKay and Jack Novak. Coach McKay felt that the difference was that the team did not begin giving effort until the fourth quarter. McKay also felt that the Chiefs left themselves vulnerable by trying to run up the score. Bert Cooper, filling in at linebacker for an injured Steve Reese, was consistently exploited in the passing game. McKay later threatened to fire players who he felt were giving a slack effort, specifically referring to a Chiefs kickoff that rolled all the way to the 4-yard line, with no Buccaneers trying to recover it. Spectators booed the team, and one threw a dead bird at Spurrier as he returned to the locker room after the game. Buccaneer defenders found some consolation in having held the AFC's top offensive team to only 13 points. Defensive end Council Rudolph played, despite the death of his father the previous evening.

=== Week 9: at Denver Broncos ===
Week Nine: Tampa Bay Buccaneers at Denver Broncos – Game summary

Quarter	1	2	3	4	Total
Buccaneers	0	10	3	0	13
Broncos	10	0	14	24	48

at Mile High Stadium, Denver, Colorado

- Date: November 7
- Game time: 4:00 p.m. EST / 2:00 p.m. MST
- Game weather: 42 °F (5.6 °C)
- Game attendance: 61,703
- Referee: Don Wedge
- Box score

Game information

First quarter

- DEN – Jim Turner 19-yard field goal. Broncos 3–0.
- DEN – Otis Armstrong 36-yard pass from Steve Ramsey (Jim Turner kick). Broncos 10–0.

Second quarter

- TB – Louis Carter 3-yard run (Dave Green kick). Broncos 10–7.
- TB – Dave Green 45-yard field goal. Tied 10–10.

Third quarter

- TB – Dave Green 35-yard field goal. Buccaneers 13–10.
- DEN – Haven Moses 71-yard pass from Steve Ramsey (Jim Turner kick). Broncos 17–13.
- DEN – Randy Gradishar 31-yard interception return (Jim Turner kick). Broncos 24–13.

Fourth quarter

- DEN – Jim Turner 33-yard field goal. Broncos 27–13.
- DEN – Lonnie Perrin 9-yard run (Jim Turner kick). Broncos 34–13.
- DEN – John Rowser 32-yard interception return (Jim Turner kick). Broncos 41–13.
- DEN – Randy Poltl 26-yard fumble return (Jim Turner kick). Broncos 48–13.

Top passers

- TB – Steve Spurrier – 16/32, 131 yards, INT
- DEN – Steve Ramsey – 9/18, 200 yards, 2 TD, 2 INT

Top rushers

- TB – Louis Carter – 16 rushes, 39 yards, TD
- DEN – Otis Armstrong – 18 rushes, 116 yards

Top receivers

- TB – Bob Moore – 5 receptions, 43 yards
- DEN – Otis Armstrong – 3 receptions, 64 yards, TD

With the score tied 10–10, Buccaneer linebacker Cal Peterson suffered a career-ending injury untouched when his knee gave out while running in an interception for what would have been a touchdown. Lee Roy Selmon also suffered a season-ending knee injury. After taking a 13–10 lead on a Dave Green field goal, the injury-riddled Buccaneers were doomed by an 18 1/2 minute span in which the Broncos scored 38 points. Coach McKay accused Broncos coach John Ralston of running up the score and stormed off of the field, refusing to shake hands with him after the game. He later referred to Ralston as a "horse's ass" and said, "I don't like any part of him. His day is coming". Ralston responded by pointing out that most of the Broncos points came on fumble recoveries and interceptions. McKay later revealed his thoughts on the team's likely high draft position, saying "This team needs a catalyst. Ricky Bell can run through a wall".

=== Week 10: at New York Jets ===
Week Ten: Tampa Bay Buccaneers at New York Jets – Game summary

Quarter	1	2	3	4	Total
Buccaneers	0	0	0	0	0
Jets	7	17	7	3	34

at Shea Stadium, Flushing Meadows–Corona Park, New York

- Date: November 14
- Game time: 1:00 p.m. EST
- Game weather: 42 °F (5.6 °C)
- Game attendance: 46,427
- Referee: Bernie Ulman
- Box score

Game information

First quarter

- NYJ – Clark Gaines 14-yard run (Pat Leahy kick). Jets 7–0.

Second quarter

- NYJ – Rich Caster 3-yard pass from Joe Namath (Pat Leahy kick). Jets 14–0.
- NYJ – Pat Leahy 21-yard field goal. Jets 17–0.
- NYJ – Steve Davis 5-yard run (Pat Leahy kick). Jets 24–0.

Third quarter

- NYJ – Lou Piccone 60-yard punt return (Pat Leahy kick). Jets 31–0.

Fourth quarter

- NYJ – Pat Leahy 30-yard field goal. Jets 34–0.

Top passers

- TB – Steve Spurrier – 8/19, 75 yards
- NYJ – Joe Namath – 7/12, 94 yards, TD

Top rushers

- TB – Louis Carter – 19 rushes, 70 yards
- NYJ – Clark Gaines – 27 rushes, 103 yards, TD

Top receivers

- TB – John McKay Jr. – 1 reception, 49 yards
- NYJ – Clark Gaines – 4 receptions, 76 yards

In what was according to coach Lou Holtz a prearranged move, New York Jets rookie quarterback Richard Todd was replaced by Joe Namath late in the first quarter. Namath responded with a passing display that gave the Jets a 24–0 halftime lead. Saying that his players were "polite" to Namath, coach McKay compared the Buccaneers to a junior-high team, and said that the only thing they did better than the Jets was to be the first team on the field after halftime. Clark Gaines rushed for 103 yards for the Jets. The Buccaneers' three quarterbacks combined for 171 yards passing, more than the Jets' quarterbacks, but the Buccaneers failed to score for the fourth time in the season. As the score rose, the press box announcer began calling out records set during the game, which included the Jets' first shutout in Shea Stadium. This was considered to be the Buccaneers' last good chance to win a game, with their four final opponents all in playoff contention. The Jets' 34 points were nearly a third of their season total of 110 after ten games, and a fifth of their season total of 169.

=== Week 11: vs Cleveland Browns ===
Week Eleven: Cleveland Browns at Tampa Bay Buccaneers – Game summary

Quarter	1	2	3	4	Total
Browns	7	0	7	10	24
Buccaneers	0	7	0	0	7

at Tampa Stadium, Tampa, Florida

- Date: November 21
- Game time: 1:00 p.m. EST
- Game weather: 69 °F (20.6 °C)
- Game attendance: 36,930
- Referee: Jim Tunney
- Box score

Game information

First quarter

- CLE – Cleo Miller 2-yard run (Don Cockroft kick). Browns 7–0.

Second quarter

- TB – Essex Johnson 12-yard pass from Steve Spurrier (Dave Green kick). Tied 7–7.

Third quarter

- CLE – Paul Warfield 15-yard pass from Brian Sipe (Don Cockroft kick). Browns 14–7.

Fourth quarter

- CLE – Joe Jones fumble recovery in end zone (Don Cockroft kick). Browns 21–7.
- CLE – Don Cockroft 32-yard field goal. Browns 24–7.

Top passers

- CLE – Brian Sipe – 10/18, 131 yards, TD
- TB – Steve Spurrier – 15/28, 135 yards, TD

Top rushers

- CLE – Cleo Miller – 14 rushes, 49 yards, TD
- TB – Ed Williams – 11 rushes, 39 yards

Top receivers

- CLE – Paul Warfield – 4 receptions, 79 yards, TD
- TB – Bob Moore – 5 receptions, 56 yards

Strong first-half play left the Buccaneers tied 7–7 with the Cleveland Browns at halftime, but they failed to maintain the intensity for the second half of the game. A screen pass from Steve Spurrier to Essex Johnson caught the blitzing Cleveland linebackers out of position for a 13-yard touchdown. The solid blocking of the first half gave way to the Cleveland rush in the second half, and Spurrier was replaced with Parnell Dickinson in the fourth quarter. Dickinson wound up leaving the game with a season-ending knee injury on a play in which he threw an interception to Terry Brown. Two Browns players were ejected for fighting, in a game in which several Buccaneers complained of cheap shots being taken. Dave Pear said, "If I had a gun, I would have shot them both in the head", of two Cleveland players who tried to take out his knees.

=== Week 12: at Oakland Raiders ===
Week Twelve: Tampa Bay Buccaneers at Oakland Raiders – Game summary

Quarter	1	2	3	4	Total
Buccaneers	7	3	0	6	16
Raiders	7	14	21	7	49

at Oakland–Alameda County Coliseum, Oakland, California

- Date: November 28
- Game time: 4:00 p.m. EST / 1:00 p.m. PST
- Game weather: 51 °F (10.6 °C)
- Game attendance: 49,590
- Referee: Fred Silva
- Box score

Game information

First quarter

- OAK – Mark van Eeghen 1-yard run (Errol Mann kick). Raiders 7–0.
- TB – Ed Williams 2-yard run (Dave Green kick). Tied 7–7.

Second quarter

- OAK – Mark van Eeghen 1-yard run (Errol Mann kick). Raiders 14–7.
- OAK – Pete Banaszak 2-yard run (Errol Mann kick). Raiders 21–7.
- TB – Dave Green 30-yard field goal. Raiders 21–10.

Third quarter

- OAK – Warren Bankston 9-yard pass from Ken Stabler (Errol Mann kick). Raiders 28–10.
- OAK – Cliff Branch 25-yard pass from Ken Stabler (Errol Mann kick). Raiders 35–10.
- OAK – Carl Garrett 1-yard run (Errol Mann kick). Raiders 42–10.

Fourth quarter

- TB – Morris Owens 9-yard pass from Steve Spurrier (kick failed). Raiders 42–16.
- OAK – Mike Siani 37-yard pass from Mike Rae (Errol Mann kick). Raiders 49–16.

Top passers

- TB – Steve Spurrier – 12/29, 128 yards, TD, 2 INT
- OAK – Ken Stabler – 15/23, 245 yards, 2 TD, INT

Top rushers

- TB – Louis Carter – 13 rushes, 40 yards
- OAK – Mark van Eeghen – 21 rushes, 93 yards, 2 TD

Top receivers

- TB – Freddie Douglas – 2 receptions, 46 yards
- OAK – Cliff Branch – 5 receptions, 110 yards, TD

The Oakland Raiders, with an NFL-best 11–1 record, scored three touchdowns before the Buccaneers got their third first down. Mark van Eeghen scored on two 1-yard runs. A 2-yard Ed Williams touchdown run tied the score at 7–7 after the Buccaneers recovered a fumble at the Oakland 14-yard line in the first quarter. A Dave Green field goal made the score 21–10 at halftime, but Ken Stabler threw for two third-quarter touchdowns for the Raiders. Steve Spurrier finished the Buccaneers' scoring with a fourth-quarter touchdown pass to Morris Owens. Dewey Selmon suffered a serious knee injury, the Buccaneers' 14th of the season, on the first play of the game.

=== Week 13: at Pittsburgh Steelers ===
Week Thirteen: Tampa Bay Buccaneers at Pittsburgh Steelers – Game summary

Quarter	1	2	3	4	Total
Buccaneers	0	0	0	0	0
Steelers	7	21	14	0	42

at Three Rivers Stadium, Pittsburgh, Pennsylvania

- Date: December 5
- Game time: 1:00 p.m. EST
- Game weather: 23 °F (−5 °C)
- Game attendance: 43,385
- Referee: Cal Lepore
- Box score

Game information

First quarter

- PIT – Rocky Bleier 7-yard run (Roy Gerela kick). Steelers 7–0.

Second quarter

- PIT – Rocky Bleier 1-yard run (Roy Gerela kick). Steelers 14–0.
- PIT – Mike Kruczek 1-yard run (Roy Gerela kick). Steelers 21–0.
- PIT – Rocky Bleier 1-yard run (Roy Gerela kick). Steelers 28–0.

Third quarter

- PIT – Lynn Swann 35-yard pass from Terry Bradshaw (Roy Gerela kick). Steelers 35–0.
- PIT – Lynn Swann 23-yard pass from Terry Bradshaw (Roy Gerela kick). Steelers 42–0.

Fourth quarter

- No scoring plays

Top passers

- TB – Steve Spurrier – 4/10, 58 yards, INT
- PIT – Mike Kruczek – 6/7, 84 yards

Top rushers

- TB – Jimmy DuBose – 5 receptions, 32 yards
- PIT – Rocky Bleier – 29 rushes, 118 yards, 3 TD

Top receivers

- TB – Jack Novak – 2 receptions, 30 yards
- PIT – Lynn Swann – 5 receptions, 92 yards, 2 TD

John McKay gave ex-Steelers quarterback Terry Hanratty the start against his former team, saying that Hanratty's familiarity with the Steelers' schemes made him the best choice. "I don't know if I'm doing him a favor or not", said McKay, who compared the game to Custer's last stand. Hanratty was pulled in favor of Steve Spurrier in the second half. McKay later told reporters critical of Hanratty's performance, "You guys should take a Sunday off and play behind our offensive line. They just poured in on us." Rocky Bleier ran for 118 yards and three touchdowns, and Terry Bradshaw completed two touchdown passes to Lynn Swann. Franco Harris, with 55 yards rushing, became the fourth player both to rush for 5,000 yards in four seasons, and to gain 1,000 yards four or more times. The Steelers jumped out to a quick 21–0 lead, helped by two early Tampa Bay turnovers deep in their own territory. Pittsburgh players, some of whom could still remember having gone 0–13 after winning their opener in 1969, described the game as "strange", but declined to comment on the Buccaneers' play. The Buccaneers managed only 85 yards of offense against a Steeler team that needed the win to maintain their playoff chances.

This game had the distinction of being what is believed to be the largest points spread in NFL history, as Pittsburgh was favored by 24. This record was surpassed in 2013 when the Denver Broncos were favored in a 28-point spread against the Jacksonville Jaguars. Though the Broncos won the game, they did not cover (winning only 35–19) leaving Pittsburgh with the largest point spread covered by a favourite. This was the only game in NFL history in which a favorite has covered a spread of more than 20 points until the Dallas Cowboys covered as 22 point favorites against the Miami Dolphins in 2019.

=== Week 14: vs New England Patriots ===
Week Fourteen: New England Patriots at Tampa Bay Buccaneers – Game summary

Quarter	1	2	3	4	Total
Patriots	0	7	7	17	31
Buccaneers	0	14	0	0	14

at Tampa Stadium, Tampa, Florida

- Date: December 12
- Game time: 1:00 p.m. EST
- Game weather: 73 °F (22.8 °C)
- Game attendance: 41,517
- Referee: Tommy Bell
- Box score

Game information

First quarter

- No scoring plays

Second quarter

- TB – Ed Williams 17-yard run (Dave Green kick). Buccaneers 7–0.
- NE – Andy Johnson 69-yard run (John Smith kick). Tied 7–7.
- TB – Morris Owens 17-yard pass from Steve Spurrier (Dave Green kick). Buccaneers 14–7.

Third quarter

- NE – Andy Johnson 9-yard run (John Smith kick). Tied 14–14.

Fourth quarter

- NE – Sam Hunt 68-yard interception return (John Smith kick). Patriots 21–14.
- NE – John Smith 30-yard field goal. Patriots 24–14.
- NE – Steve Grogan 1-yard run (Steve Zabel kick). Patriots 31–14.

Top passers

- NE – Steve Grogan – 4/14, 40 yards, INT
- TB – Steve Spurrier – 12/17, 145 yards, TD, INT

Top rushers

- NE – Andy Johnson – 14 rushes, 127 yards, 2 TD
- TB – Ed Williams – 15 rushes, 58 yards, TD

Top receivers

- NE – Steve Burks – 1 reception, 17 yards
- TB – Jack Novak – 3 receptions, 55 yards

Two fumbles deep in New England Patriots territory overcame a stubborn Buccaneer effort. The Patriots' 260 rushing yards stood for years as the most allowed in a game by the Buccaneers, while their total of four pass completions remains the least by a Tampa Bay opponent. New England came from behind twice on Andy Johnson touchdown runs, and took the lead for good on Sam Hunt's 58-yard return of a Steve Spurrier interception. Johnson's first touchdown run was a 69-yarder that set a club record. Patriots quarterback Steve Grogan set an NFL record with four seconds left, rushing for his 12th touchdown of the year. The Buccaneers also set an NFL record by becoming the only team to go winless in a 14-game season.

== Awards and records ==
- Steve Spurrier and Pat Toomay were named offensive and defensive MVPs, respectively.
- Dave Pear was named team MVP by area sportswriters
- Morris Owens' three touchdowns against Miami on October 24 stood for nine years as the team record, and is still second-place all-time (both for touchdowns and points scored in a single game).
- The defense allowed 933 plays, the fewest until the 1998 team allowed 925.
- The 321 passing attempts and 180 completions are both the fewest ever allowed by the Buccaneers.
