= 1976 NFL expansion draft =

Player selection draft

General information
- Sport: American football
- Date: March 30–31, 1976

Overview
- League: NFL
- Expansion teams: Seattle Seahawks; Tampa Bay Buccaneers
- Expansion season: 1976

The 1976 National Football League (NFL) expansion draft was held March 30–31, 1976. The expansion teams, the Seattle Seahawks and the Tampa Bay Buccaneers, each selected 39 players from the other 26 NFL teams. Before the draft, each of the existing NFL teams was allowed to protect 29 players from selection by the expansion teams. When one player was chosen from an existing team, that team was then permitted to protect two additional players. The expansion teams continued until three players had been picked from each of the existing teams.

The expansion draft was originally scheduled for January 23–24, but was postponed when the owners of the Seahawks and Buccaneers filed a lawsuit against the players' union with worries that the organization would try to prevent the draft. The court case delayed both the expansion draft and the annual college draft.

== Seattle selections ==
Player	Position	College	Original NFL team
Wayne Baker	DT	BYU	San Francisco 49ers
Carl Barisich	DT	Princeton	Cleveland Browns
Nick Bebout	OT	Wyoming	Atlanta Falcons
Lyle Blackwood	DB	TCU	Cincinnati Bengals
Ed Bradley	LB	Wake Forest	Pittsburgh Steelers
Dave Brown	DB	Michigan	Pittsburgh Steelers
Don Clune	WR	Pennsylvania	New York Giants
Rondy Colbert	DB	Lamar	New York Giants
Dwayne Crump	DB	Fresno State	St. Louis Cardinals
Mike Curtis	LB	Duke	Baltimore Colts
Jerry Davis	DB	Morris Brown	New York Jets
John Demarie	OG	LSU	Cleveland Browns
Norm Evans	OT	TCU	Miami Dolphins
Ken Geddes	LB	Nebraska	Los Angeles Rams
Neil Graff	QB	Wisconsin	New England Patriots
Don Hansen	LB	Illinois	Atlanta Falcons
Gary Hayman	RB	Penn State	Buffalo Bills
Fred Hoaglin	C	Pittsburgh	Houston Oilers
Ron Howard	TE	Seattle	Dallas Cowboys
Ken Hutcherson	LB	Livingston State	Green Bay Packers
Gordon Jolley	OT	Utah	Detroit Lions
Gary Keithley	QB	Texas-El Paso	St. Louis Cardinals
Art Kuehn	C	UCLA	Washington Redskins
Kerry Marbury	RB	West Virginia	New England Patriots
Al Matthews	DB	Texas A&I	Green Bay Packers
Sam McCullum	WR	Montana State	Minnesota Vikings
John McMakin	TE	Clemson	Detroit Lions
Eddie McMillan	DB	Florida State	Los Angeles Rams
Bill Olds	RB	Nebraska	Baltimore Colts
Jesse O'Neal	DE	Grambling State	Houston Oilers
Joe Owens	DE	Alcorn State	New Orleans Saints
Bob Penchion	OG	Alcorn State	San Francisco 49ers
Bob Picard	WR	Eastern Washington State	Philadelphia Eagles
Rocky Rasley	OG	Oregon State	Kansas City Chiefs
Steve Taylor	DB	Georgia	Denver Broncos
Dave Tipton	DE	Stanford	San Diego Chargers
Charles Waddell	TE	North Carolina	San Diego Chargers
Larry Woods	DT	Tennessee State	New York Jets
Rolly Woolsey	DB	Boise State	Dallas Cowboys

== Tampa Bay selections ==
Player	Position	College	Original NFL team
Larry Ball	LB	Louisville	Detroit Lions
Joe Blahak	DB	Nebraska	Minnesota Vikings
Bubba Bridges	DT	Colorado	Denver Broncos
Bubba Broussard	LB	Houston	Chicago Bears
Louis Carter	RB	Maryland	Oakland Raiders
Steve Colavito	LB	Wake Forest	Philadelphia Eagles
Mark Cotney	DB	Cameron State	Houston Oilers
Mike Current	OT	Ohio State	Denver Broncos
Anthony Davis	RB	USC	New York Jets
Ricky Davis	DB	Alabama	Cincinnati Bengals
Earl Douthitt	DB	Iowa	Chicago Bears
Bruce Elia	LB	Ohio State	Miami Dolphins
Larry Ely	LB	Iowa	Chicago Bears
Howard Fest	OG	Texas	Cincinnati Bengals
Ira Gordon	OG	Kansas State	San Diego Chargers
Jimmy Gunn	LB	USC	New York Giants
Harold Hart	RB	Texas Southern	Oakland Raiders
Durwood Keeton	DB	Oklahoma	New England Patriots
Jim Kearney	DB	Prairie View	Kansas City Chiefs
Vince Kendrick	RB	Florida	Atlanta Falcons
Morris LaGrand	RB	Tampa	New Orleans Saints
Willie McGee	WR	Alcorn State	Los Angeles Rams
John (J.K.) McKay	WR	USC	Cleveland Browns
Bob Moore	TE	Stanford	Oakland Raiders
Manfred Moore	RB	USC	San Francisco 49ers
Frank Oliver	DB	Kentucky State	Buffalo Bills
Dave Pear	DT	Washington	Baltimore Colts
Cal Peterson	LB	UCLA	Dallas Cowboys
Dave Reavis	OT	Arkansas	Pittsburgh Steelers
Council Rudolph	DE	Kentucky State	St. Louis Cardinals
Dan Ryczek	C	Virginia	Washington Redskins
Barry Smith	WR	Florida State	Green Bay Packers
Ken Stone	DB	Vanderbilt	Washington Redskins
Doug Swift	LB	Amherst	Miami Dolphins
Dave Thompson	OT-C	Clemson	New Orleans Saints
Pat Toomay	DE	Vanderbilt	Buffalo Bills
John Ward	C-OG	Oklahoma State	Minnesota Vikings
Lawrence Williams	WR	Texas Tech	Kansas City Chiefs
Dan Yochum	OT	Syracuse	Philadelphia Eagles
