= 1975 Cincinnati Bengals season =

NFL team season

- Head coach: Paul Brown
- Home stadium: Riverfront Stadium

Results
- Record: 11–3
- Division place: 2nd AFC Central
- Playoffs: Lost Divisional Playoffs (at Raiders) 28–31

The 1975 Cincinnati Bengals season was the franchise's 6th season in the National Football League, and the 8th overall.

The final season for Paul Brown as head coach, Cincinnati opened the season with six straight wins and went on to post an 11–3 record, their best regular-season mark. The Bengals qualified as the AFC wild card team for the playoffs, but lost to the Oakland, 31–28, in the divisional round of the playoffs. Ken Anderson won his second NFL passing championship. A serious blow was the loss of defensive tackle Mike Reid, who, only 27, retired in the off-season to pursue a career in music.

The team qualified for the postseason for the third time in just eight years of existence, but 1975 would be the last time that the Bengals would do so until 1981. The Bengals ended the season at 11-3, with all of their losses coming in division play, losing twice to the eventual champion Steelers, and a road loss to Cleveland. They finished 8–0 against teams outside of the AFC Central.

This was Bill Walsh's final season as offensive coordinator in Cincinnati. He departed after the season to join the San Diego Chargers with the same role, and then went on to become head coach at Stanford University, and then the San Francisco 49ers, where he later won 3 Super Bowls with them, which included 2 against the Bengals.

== Offseason ==
=== NFL draft ===
1975 Cincinnati Bengals draft
Round	Pick	Player	Position	College	Notes
1	14	Glenn Cameron	Linebacker	Florida	
2	39	Al Krevis	Offensive tackle	Boston College	
3	55	Gary Burley	Defensive end	Pittsburgh	
3	64	Gary Sheide	Quarterback	BYU	
3	77	Bo Harris	Linebacker	LSU	
4	97	Stan Fritts	Running back	North Carolina State	
5	120	Pat McInally *	Wide receiver	Harvard	
5	122	Jeff West	Punter	Cincinnati	
6	142	Tom Shuman	Quarterback	Penn State	
6	145	Rollen Smith	Defensive back	Arkansas	
7	170	Chris Devlin	Linebacker	Penn State	
8	195	Ricky Davis	Defensive back	Alabama	
9	220	Greg Dubinetz	Guard	Yale	
9	227	Lofell Williams	Wide receiver	Virginia Union	
10	245	Rockey Felker	Defensive back	Mississippi State	
11	276	Marvin Cobb	Defensive back	USC	
12	301	Jack Novak	Tight end	Wisconsin	
13	326	Ron Rosenberg	Linebacker	Montana	
14	351	Frank Haywood	Defensive tackle	North Carolina State	
15	376	Greg Enright	Placekicker	Southern Oregon	
16	401	John Tuttle	Wide receiver	Kansas State	
17	432	Elvin Charity	Defensive back	Yale	
Made roster * Made at least one Pro Bowl during career

== Personnel ==
=== Staff / Coaches ===
1975 Cincinnati Bengals staff
Front office: President – John Sawyer; Director of Player Personnel – Pete Brown; Head coaches: Head Coach/General Manager – Paul Brown; Offensive coaches: Quarterbacks/Receivers – Bill Walsh; Offensive Backfield – Jack Donaldson; Offensive Line – Bill Johnson	Defensive coaches: Defensive Coordinator/Defensive Backfield – Chuck Weber; Defensive Line – Chuck Studley; Linebackers – Howard Brinker; Strength and conditioning: Strength – Kim Wood

=== Roster ===
1975 Cincinnati Bengals roster
Quarterbacks (QB): 14 Ken Anderson; 11 John Reaves; Running backs (RB): 42 Boobie Clark; 36 Lenvil Elliott; 33 Stan Fritts; 38 Champ Henson; 19 Essex Johnson; 43 Ed Williams; Wide receivers (WR): 85 Isaac Curtis; 18 Charlie Joiner; 25 Chip Myers; 86 John McDaniel; Tight ends (TE): 88 Bruce Coslet; 89 Jack Novak; 84 Bob Trumpy	Offensive linemen (OL): 72 Howard Fest G; 76 Vernon Holland T; 54 Bob Johnson C; 75 Al Krevis T; 62 Dave Lapham G; 71 Rufus Mayes T; 64 John Shinners G; Defensive linemen (DL): 78 Bob Brown DT; 70 Ron Carpenter DT; 80 Ken Johnson DE; 68 Bill Kollar DT; 65 Maulty Moore DT/DE; 83 Sherman White DE	Linebackers (LB): 58 Al Beauchamp OLB; 50 Glenn Cameron MLB; 52 Brad Cousino OLB; 51 Chris Devlin OLB; 53 Bo Harris OLB; 55 Jim LeClair MLB; 60 Ron Pritchard OLB; Defensive backs (DB): 29 Lyle Blackwood SS; 37 Tommy Casanova SS; 24 Marvin Cobb CB; 27 Ricky Davis FS; 23 Bernard Jackson FS; 20 Lemar Parrish CB; 13 Ken Riley CB; Special teams (ST): 41 Dave Green K/P	Reserve: 82 Royce Berry DE (IR); 67 Gary Burley DE (IR); 26 Charlie Davis RB (IR); 87 Pat McInally WR (IR); Rookies in italics 46 active, 4 reserve, 0 practice squad

== Regular season ==
=== Schedule ===
Week	Date	Opponent	Result	Record	Venue	Recap
1	September 21	**Cleveland Browns**	**W** 24–17	1–0	Riverfront Stadium	Recap
2	September 28	at New Orleans Saints	**W** 21–0	2–0	Louisiana Superdome	Recap
3	October 5	at **Houston Oilers**	**W** 21–19	3–0	Astrodome	Recap
4	October 12	New England Patriots	**W** 27–10	4–0	Riverfront Stadium	Recap
5	October 19	Oakland Raiders	**W** 14–10	5–0	Riverfront Stadium	Recap
6	October 26	at Atlanta Falcons	**W** 21–14	6–0	Atlanta–Fulton County Stadium	Recap
7	November 2	**Pittsburgh Steelers**	**L** 24–30	6–1	Riverfront Stadium	Recap
8	November 9	at Denver Broncos	**W** 17–16	7–1	Mile High Stadium	Recap
9	November 17	Buffalo Bills	**W** 33–24	8–1	Riverfront Stadium	Recap
10	November 23	at **Cleveland Browns**	**L** 23–35	8–2	Cleveland Stadium	Recap
11	November 30	**Houston Oilers**	**W** 23–19	9–2	Riverfront Stadium	Recap
12	December 7	at Philadelphia Eagles	**W** 31–0	10–2	Veterans Stadium	Recap
13	December 13	at **Pittsburgh Steelers**	**L** 14–35	10–3	Three Rivers Stadium	Recap
14	December 21	San Diego Chargers	**W** 47–17	11–3	Riverfront Stadium	Recap
Note: Intra-division opponents are in **bold** text.

=== Season summary ===
==== Week 1 ====
Team	1	2	3	4	Total
Browns	0	3	14	0	17
• **Bengals**	14	3	7	0	24

- Date: September 21
- Location: Riverfront Stadium • Cincinnati
- Game start: 1:00 p.m.
- Game weather: 57 °F (14 °C), wind 11 mph (18 km/h)

Scoring summary
1	CIN	Isaac Curtis 27-yard pass from Ken Anderson (Dave Green kick)	Bengals 7–0
1	CIN	Boobie Clark 14-yard run (Dave Green kick)	Bengals 14–0
2	CLE	Don Cockroft 18-yard field goal	Bengals 14–3
2	CIN	Dave Green 44-yard field goal	Bengals 17–3
3	CIN	Lenvil Elliott 3-yard run (Dave Green kick)	Bengals 24–3
3	CLE	Greg Pruitt 8-yard run (Don Cockroft kick)	Bengals 24–10
3	CLE	Charlie Hall recovered fumble in end zone (Don Cockroft kick)	Bengals 24–17

==== Week 7 ====
Team	1	2	3	4	Total
• **Steelers**	0	10	13	7	30
Bengals	3	0	0	21	24

- Date: November 2
- Location: Riverfront Stadium, Cincinnati, Ohio
- Game attendance: 58,418

Scoring summary
1	CIN	Dave Green 23-yard field goal	Bengals 3–0
2	PIT	Roy Gerela 42-yard field goal	Tie 3–3
2	PIT	Lynn Swann 37-yard pass from Terry Bradshaw (Roy Gerela kick)	Steelers 10–3
3	PIT	Rocky Bleier 3-yard run (Roy Gerela kick)	Steelers 17–3
3	PIT	Lynn Swann 25-yard pass from Terry Bradshaw (kick failed)	Steelers 23–3
4	CIN	Charlie Joiner 34-yard pass from Ken Anderson (Dave Green kick)	Steelers 23–10
4	CIN	Essex Johnson 3-yard pass from Ken Anderson (Dave Green kick)	Steelers 23–17
4	PIT	Terry Bradshaw 1-yard run (Roy Gerela kick)	Steelers 30–17
4	CIN	Chip Myers 22-yard pass from Ken Anderson (Dave Green kick)	Steelers 30–24

==== Week 12 ====
Team	1	2	3	4	Total
• **Bengals**	7	17	0	7	31
Eagles	0	0	0	0	0

- Date: December 7
- Location: Veterans Stadium • Philadelphia
- Game start: 1:00 p.m. EST
- Game weather: 40 °F (4 °C) • Wind 14 mph (23 km/h)

Scoring summary
1	CIN	Ed Williams 1-yard run (Dave Green kick)	Bengals 7–0
2	CIN	Stan Fritts 3-yard run (Dave Green kick)	Bengals 14–0
2	CIN	Ed Williams 10-yard pass from Ken Anderson (Dave Green kick)	Bengals 21–0
2	CIN	Dave Green 48-yard field goal	Bengals 24–0
4	CIN	John Reaves 3-yard run (Dave Green kick)	Bengals 31–0

=== Standings ===
AFC Central
	W	L	T	PCT	DIV	CONF	PF	PA	STK
^{(1)} Pittsburgh Steelers	12	2	0	.857	6–0	10–1	373	162	L1
^{(4)} Cincinnati Bengals	11	3	0	.786	3–3	8–3	340	246	W1
Houston Oilers	10	4	0	.714	2–4	7–4	293	226	W3
Cleveland Browns	3	11	0	.214	1–5	2–8	218	372	L1

=== Team stats ===
1975 Cincinnati Bengals Team Stats
TEAM STATS	Bengals	Opponents
TOTAL FIRST DOWNS		
Rushing		
Passing		
Penalty		
TOTAL NET YARDS		
Avg Per Game		
Total Plays		
Avg. Per Play		
NET YARDS RUSHING		
Avg. Per Game		
Total Rushes		
NET YARDS PASSING		
Avg. Per Game		
Sacked Yards Lost		
Gross Yards		
Att. Completions		
Completion Pct.		
Intercepted		
PUNTS-AVERAGE		
PENALTIES-YARDS		
FUMBLES-BALL LOST		
TOUCHDOWNS		
Rushing		
Passing		
Returns		

Score by Periods	1	2	3	4	Tot
Bengals					
Opponents					

=== Team leaders ===
- Passing: Ken Anderson (377 Att, 228 Comp, 3169 Yds, 60.5 Pct, 21 TD, 11 Int, 93.9 Rating)
- Rushing: Boobie Clark (167 Att, 594 Yds, 3.6 Avg, 17 Long, 4 TD)
- Receiving: Isaac Curtis (44 Rec, 934 Yds, 21.2 Avg, 55 Long, 7 TD)
- Scoring: Dave Green, 70 points (10 FG; 40 PAT)

== Playoffs ==
Round	Date	Opponent	Result	Record	Venue	Recap
Divisional	December 28	at Oakland Raiders	L 28–31	0–1	Oakland Coliseum	Recap

== Awards and records ==
- Ken Anderson, Led NFL, Passer Rating, 93.9 Rating
