= 1974 Cincinnati Bengals season =

NFL team season

- Head coach: Paul Brown
- Home stadium: Riverfront Stadium

Results
- Record: 7–7
- Division place: 3rd AFC Central
- Playoffs: Did not qualify

The 1974 Cincinnati Bengals season was the franchise's fifth season in the National Football League, and the 7th overall. Cincinnati traded Bill Bergey to Philadelphia for two first-round draft choices and a third-round pick in 1977. Jim LeClair replaced Bergey at middle linebacker. Ken Anderson won the NFL passing championship and completed a club-record 64.9 percent of his attempts. Cornerback Lemar Parrish led the NFL in punt returns.

== Offseason ==
=== NFL draft ===
1974 Cincinnati Bengals draft
Round	Pick	Player	Position	College	Notes
1	23	Bill Kollar	Defensive tackle	Montana State	
2	48	Charlie Davis	Running back	Colorado	
3	61	Dave Lapham	Guard	Syracuse	
3	73	Evan Jolitz	Linebacker	Cincinnati	
4	87	Mike Boryla *	Quarterback	Stanford	
4	98	Darryl White	Guard	Nebraska	
4	103	Richard Williams	Wide receiver	Abilene Christian	
5	114	Haskel Stanback	Running back	Tennessee	
5	127	Richard Bishop	Defensive tackle	Louisville	
6	152	Robin Sinclair	Defensive back	Washington State	
6	153	Bill Bryant	Defensive back	Grambling State	
7	177	Ken Sawyer	Defensive back	Syracuse	
8	202	John McDaniel	Wide receiver	Lincoln (MO)	
9	231	Edward Johnson	Defensive end	SMU	
10	256	Chuck Herd	Tight end	Penn State	
11	281	Ed Kezirian	Offensive tackle	UCLA	
12	306	Rudy McClinon	Defensive back	Xavier	
13	335	Ted Jornou	Linebacker	Iowa State	
14	360	Mike Phillips	Offensive tackle	Cornell	
15	385	Isaac Jackson	Running back	Kansas State	
16	410	Darryl Bishop	Defensive back	Kentucky	
17	439	Jim Smith	Running back	North Carolina Central	
Made roster * Made at least one Pro Bowl during career

== Personnel ==
=== Staff ===
1974 Cincinnati Bengals staff
Front office: Team Owner - Paul Brown; President – John Sawyer; Director of player personnel – Pete Brown; Head coaches: Head coach/General Manager – Paul Brown; Offensive coaches: Quarterbacks/Receivers – Bill Walsh; Offensive backfield – Jack Donaldson; Offensive line – Bill Johnson	Defensive coaches: Defensive coordinator/defensive backfield – Chuck Weber; Defensive line – Chuck Studley; Linebackers – Howard Brinker

=== Roster ===
1974 Cincinnati Bengals roster
Quarterbacks (QB): 14 Ken Anderson; 11 Wayne Clark; 12 Greg Cook; Running backs (RB): 42 Boobie Clark; 26 Charlie Davis; 44 Doug Dressler; 36 Lenvil Elliott; 43 Ed Williams; Wide receivers (WR): 85 Isaac Curtis; 18 Charlie Joiner; 86 John McDaniel; 25 Chip Myers; Tight ends (TE): 81 Al Chandler; 88 Bruce Coslet; 84 Bob Trumpy	Offensive linemen (OL): 72 Howard Fest G; 54 Bob Johnson C; 62 Dave Lapham T/G; 73 Pat Matson G; 71 Rufus Mayes T; 64 John Shinners G; 75 Stan Walters T; Defensive linemen (DL): 82 Royce Berry DE; 70 Ron Carpenter DT; 68 Bill Kollar DT; 74 Mike Reid DT; 77 Bob Maddox DE; 80 Ken Johnson DE; 83 Sherman White DE	Linebackers (LB): 52 Doug Adams MLB; 51 Ken Avery MLB; 58 Al Beauchamp OLB; 57 Evan Jolitz OLB; 56 Tim Kearney OLB; 50 Vic Koegel OLB; 55 Jim LeClair MLB; 60 Ron Pritchard OLB; Defensive backs (DB): 29 Lyle Blackwood SS; 37 Tommy Casanova FS; 23 Bernard Jackson SS; 32 Bob Jones CB/S; 20 Lemar Parrish CB; 13 Ken Riley CB; 22 Ken Sawyer FS; Special teams (ST): 41 Dave Green P; 16 Horst Mühlmann K	Reserve: 76 Vernon Holland T (IR); 19 Essex Johnson RB (IR); Rookies in italics

== Regular season ==
=== Schedule ===
Week	Date	Opponent	Result	Record	Venue	Attendance	Recap
1	September 15	**Cleveland Browns**	**W** 33–7	1–0	Riverfront Stadium	53,113	Recap
2	September 22	San Diego Chargers	**L** 17–20	1–1	Riverfront Stadium	51,178	Recap
3	September 29	at San Francisco 49ers	**W** 21–3	2–1	Candlestick Park	49,895	Recap
4	October 6	Washington Redskins	**W** 28–17	3–1	Riverfront Stadium	56,175	Recap
5	October 13	at **Cleveland Browns**	**W** 34–24	4–1	Cleveland Stadium	70,897	Recap
6	October 20	at Oakland Raiders	**L** 27–30	4–2	Oakland Coliseum	51,821	Recap
7	October 27	**Houston Oilers**	**L** 21–34	4–3	Riverfront Stadium	55,434	Recap
8	November 3	at Baltimore Colts	**W** 24–14	5–3	Memorial Stadium	36,110	Recap
9	November 10	**Pittsburgh Steelers**	**W** 17–10	6–3	Riverfront Stadium	57,532	Recap
10	November 17	at **Houston Oilers**	**L** 3–20	6–4	Astrodome	44,054	Recap
11	November 24	Kansas City Chiefs	**W** 33–6	7–4	Riverfront Stadium	49,777	Recap
12	December 2	at Miami Dolphins	**L** 3–24	7–5	Miami Orange Bowl	71,962	Recap
13	December 8	Detroit Lions	**L** 19–23	7–6	Riverfront Stadium	45,159	Recap
14	December 14	at **Pittsburgh Steelers**	**L** 3–27	7–7	Three Rivers Stadium	42,878	Recap
Note: Intra-division opponents are in **bold** text.

=== Standings ===
AFC Central
	W	L	T	PCT	DIV	CONF	PF	PA	STK
Pittsburgh Steelers	10	3	1	.750	4–2	7–3–1	305	189	W2
Houston Oilers	7	7	0	.500	4–2	7–4	236	282	W1
Cincinnati Bengals	7	7	0	.500	3–3	5–6	283	259	L3
Cleveland Browns	4	10	0	.286	1–5	3–8	251	344	L2

=== Team stats ===
1974 Cincinnati Bengals Team Stats
TEAM STATS	Bengals	Opponents
TOTAL FIRST DOWNS		
Rushing		
Passing		
Penalty		
TOTAL NET YARDS		
Avg Per Game		
Total Plays		
Avg. Per Play		
NET YARDS RUSHING		
Avg. Per Game		
Total Rushes		
NET YARDS PASSING		
Avg. Per Game		
Sacked Yards Lost		
Gross Yards		
Att. Completions		
Completion Pct.		
Intercepted		
PUNTS-AVERAGE		
PENALTIES-YARDS		
FUMBLES-BALL LOST		
TOUCHDOWNS		
Rushing		
Passing		
Returns		

Score by Periods	1	2	3	4	Tot
Bengals					
Opponents					

=== Team leaders ===
- Passing: Ken Anderson (328 Att, 213 Comp, 2667 Yds, 64.9 Pct, 18 TD, 10 Int, 95.7 Rating)
- Rushing: Charlie Davis (72 Att, 375 Yds, 5.2 Avg, 29 Long, 0 TD)
- Receiving: Isaac Curtis (30 Rec, 633 Yds, 21.1 Avg, 77 Long, 10 TD)
- Scoring: Horst Muhlmann, 65 points (11 FG; 32 PAT)
