= Moton =

Moton may refer to:

== People ==
=== Given name ===
- Moton Hopkins (born 1986), American professional gridiron football player

=== Surname ===
- LeVelle Moton (born 1974), American college basketball coach
- Robert Russa Moton (1867–1940), African American educator and author
- Taylor Moton (born 1994), American football player

== Schools ==
- R.R. Moton High School, historic segregated school located in Prince Edward County, Virginia
- Dr. R. Moton High School, located in Brookside, Florida
- Moton High School (Oklahoma), Taft, Oklahoma

== Other uses ==
- Moton Field, part of the Tuskegee Airmen National Historic Site
- Moton Field Municipal Airport, Airport located north of Tuskegee, Alabama
- Robert Russa Moton Museum (Moton High School), National Historic Landmark in Prince Edward County, Virginia
- Robert Russa Moton Boyhood Home, historic plantation in Prince Edward County, Virginia
- Holly Knoll, aka Robert R. Moton House, National Historic Landmark in Gloucester County, Virginia

== See also ==
- Motown, American record label
- Morton (disambiguation)
