= Larry Ball =

American football player (born 1949)

No. 51, 53, 52
- Position: Linebacker

Personal information
- Born: September 27, 1949 (age 77); Iowa City, Iowa, U.S.
- Listed height: 6 ft 6 in (1.98 m)
- Listed weight: 232 lb (105 kg)

Career information
- High school: Rushville (IL)
- College: Louisville
- NFL draft: 1972: 4th round, 91st overall pick

Career history
- Miami Dolphins (1972–1974); Detroit Lions (1975); Tampa Bay Buccaneers (1976); Miami Dolphins (1977–1978)

Awards and highlights
- 2× Super Bowl champion (VII, VIII)

Career NFL statistics
- Games played: 79
- Interceptions: 2
- Fumble recoveries: 3
- Stats at Pro Football Reference

Larry Lavern Ball (born September 27, 1949) is an American former professional football player who was a linebacker in the National Football League (NFL). He played college football for the Louisville Cardinals.

Ball was selected in the fourth round of the 1972 NFL draft by the Miami Dolphins. He also played for the Tampa Bay Buccaneers and the Detroit Lions. During his National Football League (NFL) career, he participated in 79 games. Ball is the only player in NFL history to play an entire season for both an undefeated team, the 1972 Miami Dolphins (where he won Super Bowl VII), and a winless team, the 1976 Tampa Bay Buccaneers. (Maulty Moore also played for the 1972 Dolphins and 1976 Buccaneers, but while he was with the Dolphins for the entire 1972 season, he was signed by the '76 Bucs late in the season, playing in only five games, starting only in the final game. A third player who also played for the '72 Dolphins, Doug Swift, was taken by the Buccaneers in the expansion draft, but retired from football to enter medical school and never reported to the team.)

After football, Ball worked as a guidance counselor, department head, and coach for Miami-Dade County Public Schools in Miami, Florida. He retired in 2011 after more than 30 years of service. He is active in the South Florida community, participating in numerous charity events along with his fellow '72 Undefeated Team teammates.
