= Ken Sawyer =

American football player (born 1952)

No. 22
- Position: Safety

Personal information
- Born: July 22, 1952 (age 74); Clearfield, Pennsylvania, U.S.
- Listed height: 6 ft 0 in (1.83 m)
- Listed weight: 192 lb (87 kg)

Career information
- High school: Arlington (LaGrange, New York)
- College: Syracuse
- NFL draft: 1974: 7th round, 177th overall pick

Career history
- Cincinnati Bengals (1974); Buffalo Bills (1976)*
- * Offseason or practice squad member only
- Stats at Pro Football Reference

Kenneth Lee Sawyer (born July 22, 1952) is an American former professional football safety who played for the Cincinnati Bengals of the National Football League (NFL). He played college football for the Syracuse Orange and was selected by the Bengals in the seventh round of the 1974 NFL draft.

== Early life ==
Kenneth Lee Sawyer was born on July 22, 1952, in Clearfield, Pennsylvania. He played high school football at Arlington High School in LaGrange, New York, earning All-Dutchess County Scholastic League honors at fullback.

== College career ==
Sawyer accepted a four-year athletic scholarship to attend Syracuse University and play college football for the Orange. He was on the freshman team in 1970 as a tailback and cornerback. He was a three-year varsity letterman from 1971 to 1973 as a defensive halfback.

== Professional career ==
Sawyer was selected by the Cincinnati Bengals in the seventh round, with the 177th overall pick, of the 1974 NFL draft. He played in three of six preseason games, missing the final three due to injury. He played in 12 regular season games for the Bengals during the 1974 season as a reserve safety and special teams player. On special teams, Sawyer was tasked with signaling the punter to let him know there was an opening in the defense. The punter was then given the option of punting or passing. On September 29 against the San Francisco 49ers, Sawyer signaled to punter Dave Green, who then completed a pass for a 28-yard gain. Sawyer was waived on July 14, 1975, during training camp.

Sawyer signed with the Buffalo Bills on June 2, 1976. He was released before the season.
