= Edison High School (San Antonio) =

Thomas A. Edison High School

Location
- 701 Santa Monica Street; San Antonio, Bexar County, Texas 78212; United States; 29.471993°N 98.505104°W

Information
- School type: Public, high school
- Opened: 1929
- Locale: City: Large
- School district: San Antonio ISD
- NCES School ID: 483873004345
- Principal: Dr. Irene Cruz
- Teaching staff: 95.40 (on an FTE basis)
- Grades: 9–12
- Enrollment: 1,329 (2022–2023)
- Student to teacher ratio: 13.93
- Colors: Black and gold
- Athletics conference: UIL Class 5A
- Team name: Golden Bears
- Website: Official website

Thomas A. Edison High School is a public high school in the San Antonio Independent School District serving the Monte Vista Historic District of San Antonio, Texas. During 2022–2023, Edison High School had an enrollment of 1,329 students and a student to teacher ratio of 13.93. The school received an overall rating of "C" from the Texas Education Agency for the 2024–2025 school year.

== History ==
Edison High School was opened in 1929 on what is now the campus for John Greenleaf Whittier Academy at 2101 Edison Drive, San Antonio. It was originally a six-year junior-senior school. Increased enrollment and crowded conditions created the need to split the schools into two campuses. In September 1958, grades ten through twelve were moved into the new Edison High School building at 701 Santa Monica street. Grades seven through nine remained in the old building and became the new student body of John Greenleaf Whittier Junior High School. When SAISD moved 9th grade to the high school, John Greenleaf Whittier became a middle school housing grades 6, 7 and 8. In the fall of 2003 students at the junior high moved into temporary facilities next to the school building while new additional construction was completed. The new school opened in August 2007 as Whittier Health Science Academy. The Academy is partnered with the University of Texas Health Science Center in San Antonio.

The school received national attention in 1995 as it was at the center of the case of United States v. Lopez.

== Athletics ==
The Edison Golden Bears compete in the following sports:

- Baseball
- Basketball
- Cross country
- Football
- Golf
- Soccer
- Softball
- Swimming and diving
- Tennis
- Track and field
- Volleyball

== Alumni ==
- Howard Fest (1964), former NFL offensive lineman
- Wade Key (1964), former NFL offensive lineman
- Guido Merkens (1973), former NFL safety, quarterback and wide receiver
