= Guido Merkens =

American football player (born 1955)

No. 29, 12, 26, 19
- Positions: Quarterback, wide receiver, defensive back, punter, return specialist

Personal information
- Born: August 14, 1955 (age 71); San Antonio, Texas, U.S.
- Listed height: 6 ft 1 in (1.85 m)
- Listed weight: 200 lb (91 kg)

Career information
- High school: Edison (San Antonio)
- College: Sam Houston State
- NFL draft: 1977: undrafted

Career history
- Houston Oilers (1978–1980); New Orleans Saints (1980-1985); Philadelphia Eagles (1987)

Career NFL statistics
- Receptions: 36
- Receiving yards: 569
- Receiving touchdowns: 3
- Stats at Pro Football Reference

Guido Albert Merkens Jr. (/ˈɡiːdoʊ/ GHEE-doh; born August 14, 1955) is an American former professional football player who was a quarterback, running back, wide receiver, punter and defensive back for 10 seasons for the Houston Oilers, New Orleans Saints and Philadelphia Eagles of the National Football League (NFL). He became synonymous with the kind of player who did not excel at any one position, but was valuable because he could fill in at so many positions.

== Early life and college ==
Merkens was born on August 14, 1955, in San Antonio, Texas. Merkens’s father Guido Sr., served as founding pastor of Concordia Lutheran Church in San Antonio and was a vice president of the Lutheran Church–Missouri Synod. Merkens was a 1973 graduate of Edison High School in San Antonio, where he played offense and defense on the football team. He also played on the school's basketball team.

He then played college football at both quarterback and defensive back for the Sam Houston Bearkats. He was also a punter and kicker during his first two years. In his final two college seasons, Merkens focused more on playing quarterback, though he was still starting at cornerback early in his junior year. As a senior, he was able to focus solely on playing quarterback. His versatility became a hallmark of his professional career.

== Professional football ==
=== Houston Oilers ===
Merkens was not drafted by any NFL team, and he pursued teams as a free agent, seeking tryouts. For two years, he never reached any team's training camp. He returned to Sam Houston to pursue a master's degree and joined a softball team, where he met former NFL punter and Houston Oilers' scout Jerrel Wilson. Wilson helped Merkens reach out to NFL teams, and he was invited to the Oilers' training camp in 1978. The team cut Merkens, but soon called him back, and he made the Oilers team.

Merkens played his first two seasons in the NFL for the Oilers. He became primarily known as a punt return specialist for the Oilers, when he filled in for an injured Billy "White Shoes" Johnson, though Merkens had never previously returned a punt. He originally came onto the team as a safety, and became noted for playing multiple positions during his Oilers career; including special teams, wide receiver and backup quarterback as well as in the defensive backfield. In Merkens’s words "'I got here by being able to do a little bit of everything. I made it as a utility man. And the other players have accepted my role. They understand that my position is no position’".

=== New Orleans Saints ===
He played only three games for the Oilers in 1980, and was claimed off the waiver wire by the Saints in late 1980, where he went on to play from 1981 to 1985. Oilers coach Bum Phillips had put Merkens on waivers before and did not anticipate anyone claiming him, but the Saints were in need because of injuries. Phillips considered Merkens a quick learner, a good quarterback and good leader.

Merkens played free safety on defense for the Saints in the last game of the 1980 season, making seven tackles. Phillips became Merkens's coach again when he took over the Saints for the 1981 season, and led the team through 1985. During his tenure with the Saints, Merkins served as the third-string quarterback, holder for field goals and a "primary" special teams player; with occasional time as a wide receiver, punter or safety. He also handled some kickoff and punt returns. His penchant for being the emergency backup for all of the aforementioned positions furthered his reputation as a "jack of all trades". In 1981, he reached number three receiver status, starting a career-high eleven games, with 29 receptions, 458 yards and one touchdown.

From 1981 to 1985, he played in 73 games for the Saints (missing only seven games in 1982). Merkens unusual versatility made him an extremely popular player for the Saints, and he has been called a Saints legend.

=== Final season ===
After not playing in 1986, Merkens was a replacement player during the NFL players strike of 1987 for the Philadelphia Eagles, playing quarterback. Merkens was sacked 10 times by the Chicago Bears replacement team in his first game, a 35–3 loss.

== Later life ==
In 2007, Merkens was general manager of a CarMax dealership in the Houston.

Merkens was inducted into the Sam Houston Hall of Honor in 1988.
