= Pat Toomay =

American football player (born 1948)

No. 67, 65, 66
- Position: Defensive end

Personal information
- Born: May 17, 1948 (age 78); Pomona, California, U.S.
- Listed height: 6 ft 5 in (1.96 m)
- Listed weight: 247 lb (112 kg)

Career information
- High school: Edison (Alexandria, Virginia)
- College: Vanderbilt
- NFL draft: 1970: 6th round, 153rd overall pick

Career history
- Dallas Cowboys (1970–1974); Buffalo Bills (1975); Tampa Bay Buccaneers (1976); Oakland Raiders (1977–1979)

Awards and highlights
- Super Bowl champion (VI)

Career NFL statistics
- Games played: 142
- Games started: 83
- Interceptions: 2
- Interception yards: 79
- Fumble recoveries: 8
- Stats at Pro Football Reference

Patrick Jay Toomay (born May 17, 1948) is an American former professional football player, a defensive end for ten seasons in the National Football League (NFL) for the Dallas Cowboys, Buffalo Bills, Tampa Bay Buccaneers, and Oakland Raiders. He played college football at Vanderbilt University and was selected in the sixth round of the 1970 NFL draft by the Dallas Cowboys. He is the author of books about professional football, including The Crunch and the 1984 novel On Any Given Sunday.

== Early life ==
One of four children of a U.S. Air Force officer, Toomay was born in California and lived in various locations, including Hawaii, upstate New York, and Northern Virginia. He attended Thomas Edison High School in Alexandria, Virginia, where he was an all-state player in football, basketball, and baseball, graduating in 1966. In football, he received high school All-American honors as a running quarterback.

He accepted a football scholarship from Vanderbilt University in Nashville, Tennessee, where he was given a chance to play both basketball and football for the Commodores. As a sophomore, he made the decision to focus on football, where he was converted from quarterback, to a safety, later linebacker, and finally defensive end. As a senior, he played in the Blue–Gray Football Classic.

== Professional career ==
=== Dallas Cowboys ===
Toomay was selected in the sixth round of the 1970 NFL draft by the Dallas Cowboys, the 153rd overall pick. At the beginning of his career, he was an undersized defensive end, used mostly in substitution situations. In his third season in 1972, with the imminent retirement of George Andrie, Toomay became the starter at right defensive end, although he was limited with a broken hand.

The NFL didn't start recognizing quarterback sacks as an official statistic until 1982; however, the Cowboys have their own records, dating back before the 1982 season. According to the Cowboys' stats, Toomay is unofficially credited for leading the team in 1973 with a total of 8 sacks (second on the team). He also had one interception and recovered one fumble.

Toomay was considered a character and an intellectual during his time with the team. He was a member of the "Zero Club" which prided itself on performing behind the scenes. Their first rule, "Thou Shalt Not Seek Publicity," kept their members (Toomay, Blaine Nye, and Larry Cole) out of the limelight.

Although Toomay remained a starter in 1974, he shared playing time with Ed "Too Tall" Jones, the first overall selection of the 1974 NFL draft. That year Toomay was used mainly on running downs.

During his five seasons with Dallas, Toomay was a productive and durable player (never missing a game) and was a part of two Super Bowl teams: runners-up in V and champions in VI.

=== Buffalo Bills ===
On July 19, 1975, after playing out his option in Dallas, Toomay was a free agent and signed with the Buffalo Bills. Dallas received a second round draft choice in 1977, that was eventually used in a deal package to draft running back Tony Dorsett.

Toomay was the Bills' defensive MVP in 1975, but was involved in different controversial official calls, including being called for elbowing head lineman Jerry Bergman, which contributed to a loss against the Miami Dolphins (31–21), that ended Buffalo's playoff chances.

At the end of the year, he was left unprotected for the 1976 NFL expansion draft. Through the years, there has been speculation that the publishing of his insider view in the book The Crunch, was the main reason behind this decision. In a Sports Illustrated "Where Are They Now?" article in 2014 about the winless 1976 Bucs, Toomay said of his book that it was "in retrospect, the kind of book you write AFTER your career is over, not while you're still playing."

=== Tampa Bay Buccaneers ===
The Tampa Bay Buccaneers selected him from the Bills roster in the 1976 NFL expansion draft and he was the starter at right defensive end for their winless inaugural season (0–14), and he registered 49 tackles and 3 sacks. In a "worst to first" deal, the Bucs traded him to the reigning Super Bowl champion Oakland Raiders in July 1977, in exchange for a draft choice.

=== Oakland Raiders ===
The Oakland Raiders credited Toomay with a team leading 14 1/2 sacks in 1977. In 1978, he was credited with 5 sacks after seeing little playing time. Often used in obvious passing situations, he was known by fans as "Third down Pat." He was released in August 1979, then returned and played that season, then retired, after having problems with his knee.

== Personal life ==
Toomay published a series of books, including the novel, On Any Given Sunday. He also played the part of an assistant coach to Y. A. Tittle in the 1999 Oliver Stone film, Any Given Sunday. His father John (1922–2008) was 6 ft 7 in (2.01 m), played professional basketball in the late 1940s, and was a two-star general in the U.S. Air Force.

== Bibliography ==
- The Crunch
- On Any Given Sunday
- Clotheslined
- First Cut
- Fathers, Sons, and Football
