= Carl Roaches =

American football player (born 1953)

No. 85, 83
- Positions: Wide receiver, Kick returner

Personal information
- Born: October 2, 1953 (age 73); Houston, Texas, U.S.
- Listed height: 5 ft 8 in (1.73 m)
- Listed weight: 168 lb (76 kg)

Career information
- High school: M. B. Smiley (TX)
- College: Texas A&M
- NFL draft: 1976: 14th round, 377th overall pick

Career history
- Saskatchewan Roughriders (1977); Houston Oilers (1980–1984); New Orleans Saints (1985)

Awards and highlights
- Pro Bowl (1981); NFL records: Most consecutive starts by a kick/punt returner: 73

Career NFL statistics
- Punt/Kick returns: 309
- Return yards: 4,468
- Return touchdowns: 2
- Stats at Pro Football Reference

Carl Edward Roaches (born October 2, 1953) is an American former professional football player who was a wide receiver and kick returner in the National Football League (NFL). He played for the Houston Oilers (1980–1984) and the New Orleans Saints (1985). He went to the Pro Bowl after the 1981 season.

Roaches' professional career began when he appeared in three games as a punt returner with the Saskatchewan Roughriders in 1977. He was most noted for having been an ice cream delivery truck driver during the time between his stints in the Canadian Football League (CFL) and NFL.

== See also ==
- Most consecutive games played by a return specialist
