= Dave Green (American football) =

American football player (born 1949)

No. 11, 41, 4
- Positions: Punter, placekicker

Personal information
- Born: September 21, 1949 (age 77); Mason City, Iowa, U.S.
- Listed height: 5 ft 11 in (1.80 m)
- Listed weight: 206 lb (93 kg)

Career information
- High school: Athens (OH)
- College: Ohio
- NFL draft: 1972: 17th round, 418th overall pick

Career history
- Houston Oilers (1973); Cincinnati Bengals (1974–1975); Tampa Bay Buccaneers (1976–1978)

Career NFL statistics
- Punts: 446
- Punting yards: 17,883
- Punting average: 40.1
- Stats at Pro Football Reference

Dave Green (born September 21, 1949) is a former punter and placekicker in the National Football League (NFL). He played for the Houston Oilers, the Cincinnati Bengals, and the Tampa Bay Buccaneers. He played college football for the Ohio Bobcats.

Green was the last NFL player, along with the Cleveland Browns' Don Cockroft, to serve as his team's primary kicker and punter over the course of a season, when he led the Buccaneers in both categories in 1976. He was the first player to score for the Tampa Bay Buccaneers in their franchise history.

== NFL career statistics ==
Legend
	Led the league
**Bold**	Career high

=== Regular season ===
Year	Team	Punting									
Year	Team	GP	Punts	Yds	Net Yds	Lng	Avg	Net Avg	Blk	Ins20	TB
1973	HOU	4	22	868	714	61	39.5	32.5	0	-	2
1974	CIN	14	66	2,701	2,044	53	**40.9**	31.0	0	-	10
1975	CIN	14	68	2,655	2,189	57	39.0	31.7	1	-	4
1976	TAM	14	92	3,619	2,805	56	39.3	30.5	0	12	3
1977	TAM	14	98	3,948	3,026	**70**	40.3	30.6	1	16	6
1978	TAM	**16**	**100**	**4,092**	**3,385**	61	**40.9**	**33.2**	**2**	**20**	**13**
Career		76	446	17,883	14,163	70	40.1	31.5	4	48	38

=== Playoffs ===
Year	Team	Punting									
Year	Team	GP	Punts	Yds	Net Yds	Lng	Avg	Net Avg	Blk	Ins20	TB
1975	CIN	**1**	**6**	**215**	-	**44**	**35.8**	-	0	-	0
Career		1	6	215	-	44	35.8	-	0	-	0
