= Dr. R. Moton High School =

Coordinates: 28.5436°N 82.3791°W

- Brooksville; United States

Information
- Type: High School

Dr. R. Moton High School was a segregated high school for black students in Brooksville, Florida, United States. The Hernando County school was integrated after passage of the Civil Rights Act of 1964, and the local school board was eventually pressed to eliminate segregation in the school system. In 1969 Moton's older students and football players were moved to Hernando High School. Moton closed and the rest of the student body moved to Hernando in the fall of 1969.

== History ==
During the early 1950s the school property was purchased by the Hernando County School Board to build of a facility to serve black elementary through high school students at one location.

The school mascot was the Bulldog.

Most of the buildings are still in existence but have been repurposed as a community center. The junior high part of the school has been torn down.

John D. Floyd was the principal of Moton High School when it closed, and his name now graces John D. Floyd Elementary, a K-8 Center.

== Notable alumni ==
- Hazel Land - Lawyer: First African-American Woman to Enroll at University of Florida Law School and First African-American Female Graduate
- Maulty Moore - NFL defensive tackle
- Ralph Person - Chief Circuit Court Judge of Dade County
