= Steve Maughan =

American football player (1953–2006)

Profile
- Position: Linebacker

Personal information
- Born: 1953; Logan, Utah, U.S.
- Died: 2006

Career information
- College: Colorado State University, Utah State University
- NFL draft: 1976: 3rd round, 91st overall pick

Steve Maughan (June 7, 1953 – February 23, 2006) was an American college and professional football player. He was drafted in the third round (91st pick overall) of the 1976 NFL draft by the Tampa Bay Buccaneers. He never played a season in the National Football League (NFL).

== Biography ==
Maughan was born in Logan, Utah and attended Logan High School where his was All-State and All-America. He played college football at University of Colorado for two years, before transferring to Utah State University to play for the Utah State Aggies, where he was coached by Phil Krueger (coach).

He was drafted by the Tampa Bay Buccaneers in the third round of the 1976 draft. Maghan was seriously injured during a Tampa Bay exhibition game against the Miami Dolphins when he collided with another player, and injured his shoulder. In 1977, while recovering from his injury, he was diagnosed with Hodgkin's disease.

After undergoing radiation treatment, his cancer went into remission and he was able to enter Tampa Bay's training camp in 1978. His health was weakened, and while playing in a Tampa Bay exhibition game he broke two ribs. Tampa Bay released him, and he did not play a season in the NFL.

After leaving the NFL, Maughan became a physical therapist and lived in Smyrna, Georgia with his wife Melanie.

He died in 2006 from Lou Gehrig's disease at the age of 52.
