= Ira Gordon =

American football player (born 1947)

No. 69
- Position: Offensive tackle

Personal information
- Born: May 5, 1947 (age 79); Kilbourne, Louisiana, U.S.
- Listed height: 6 ft 3 in (1.91 m)
- Listed weight: 275 lb (125 kg)

Career information
- College: Kansas State
- NFL draft: 1970: 8th round, 190th overall pick

Career history
- Philadelphia Eagles (1970)*; San Diego Chargers (1970–1975); Tampa Bay Buccaneers (1976)*
- * Offseason or practice squad member only

Career NFL statistics
- Games played: 62
- Games started: 14
- Fumble recoveries: 3
- Stats at Pro Football Reference

Ira Lawrence Gordon (born May 5, 1947) is an American former professional football player who was an offensive tackle for six seasons with the San Diego Chargers of the National Football League (NFL). He played college football for the Kansas State Wildcats.

In the NFL, Gordon became a starter in his last two seasons. Left unprotected in the 1976 NFL expansion draft, he was selected by the Tampa Bay Buccaneers. He was expected to start for the Bucs, but wound up as a surprise training camp cut. Coach John McKay would not comment on outgoing players, but had earlier expressed concern that, although Gordon had potential to be one of the league's better guards, he would have difficulty learning the team's offensive system due to missing much of training camp with a contract dispute. Gordon believed that Buccaneer coaches soured on his outspokenness over harsh practice conditions, which included two-a-day practices in the Tampa sun with no water breaks, and refused to play football after the experience. The brother of Arizona State University and Miami Dolphins linebacker Larry Gordon, he worked in Phoenix, Arizona as a drug counselor after his NFL career.
