= Steve Young (offensive tackle) =

American football player (born 1953)

No. 71, 74
- Position: Offensive tackle

Personal information
- Born: July 18, 1953 (age 73); Spokane, Washington, U.S.
- Listed height: 6 ft 8 in (2.03 m)
- Listed weight: 272 lb (123 kg)

Career information
- High school: Chaffey (CA)
- College: Colorado
- NFL draft: 1976: 3rd round, 61st overall pick

Career history
- Tampa Bay Buccaneers (1976); Miami Dolphins (1977)

Career NFL statistics
- Games played: 27
- Games started: 11
- Fumble recoveries: 2
- Stats at Pro Football Reference

Steven Russell Young (born July 18, 1953) is a former National Football League (NFL) offensive tackle who played for the Tampa Bay Buccaneers and Miami Dolphins from 1976 to 1977. He attended Chaffey High School and then the University of Colorado before being drafted by the Buccaneers in the third round, 61st overall, in the 1976 NFL draft.
