= Boobie Clark =

American football player (1949–1988)

No. 35, 42
- Position: Running back

Personal information
- Born: November 8, 1949; Jacksonville, Florida, U.S.
- Died: October 25, 1988 (aged 38)
- Listed height: 6 ft 2 in (1.88 m)
- Listed weight: 245 lb (111 kg)

Career information
- High school: Stanton College Prep (Jacksonville)
- College: Bethune–Cookman
- NFL draft: 1973: 12th round, 302nd overall pick

Career history
- Cincinnati Bengals (1973–1978); Houston Oilers (1979–1980)

Awards and highlights
- UPI AFC Rookie of the Year (1973)

Career NFL statistics
- Rushing attempts: 802
- Rushing yards: 3,032
- Receptions: 157
- Receiving yards: 1,197
- Total touchdowns: 27
- Stats at Pro Football Reference

Charles Lee "Boobie" Clark (November 8, 1949 – October 25, 1988) was an American professional football running back who played in the National Football League (NFL) for eight seasons and was named the UPI AFL–AFC Rookie of the Year for 1973.

== Early life ==
Clark was born in Jacksonville, Florida and was an athletic standout at Stanton High School, where the nickname "Boobie" originated. He played tight end in high school and at Bethune-Cookman University.

He was an offensive line stalwart at Bethune-Cookman, with one exception. During a 48–0 victory over Albany State University in 1971, head coach Cy McClairen placed Clark at fullback because a lot of his teammates were nursing injuries.

That game film was sent to Cincinnati Bengals head coach Paul Brown to showcase other players, but Brown saw something in Clark and decided he would draft him if the opportunity came.

== Professional career ==
He was drafted in the 12th round of the 1973 NFL draft by the Cincinnati Bengals and became a fullback. Despite inexperience at the position, he was a breakout star with 988 yards in 254 carries (a 3.9 average) and eight touchdowns and 45 receptions for 347 yards (a 7.7 average). He was named American Football Conference Rookie of the Year in 1973.

That same year, Clark was involved in an on-field incident in which he struck Dale Hackbart of the Denver Broncos with a right forearm to the back of Hackbart's head and neck after a play was finished. Hackbart filed a lawsuit and the case eventually went to trial as an intentional tort, specifically battery (tort). Clark testified that his team was losing and that he intentionally hit Hackbart due to his frustration. The case went as far as the United States Court of Appeals (10th Circuit) in 1979.

In 1974, Clark was limited to eight games, with 312 yards in 99 attempts (a 3.2 average) with five touchdowns and 23 receptions for 194 yards (an 8.4 average).

A year later, 1975, he bounced back played all 14 games with 594 yards on 167 attempts (a 3.6 average) and four touchdowns plus 42 receptions for 334 yards (an 8.0 average).

In 1976, Clark gained 671 yards on 151 attempts (a 4.4 average) and seven touchdowns with 23 receptions for 158 yards (a 6.9 average) and one touchdown.

In 1977, he was limited to 10 games with 226 yards on 68 attempts (a 3.3 average) and one touchdown with seven receptions for 33 yards (a 4.7 average).

Clark's sixth and final season with the Bengals was 1978. He played in 14 games and rushed for 187 yards on 40 attempts (a career-high 4.7 average) and caught 11 passes for 43 yards (a 6.6 average).

For his six seasons with the Bengals, Clark rushed for 2,978 yards and 25 touchdowns. He also caught 151 passes for 1,139 yards and two touchdowns.

Clark was traded to the Houston Oilers prior to the 1979 season, the first of two with the Oilers. In 1979, he rushed for 51 yards on 22 carries (a 2.3 average) and had six receptions for 58 yards. The 1980 season would be his last, when he had just one carry for three yards. He retired prior to the 1981 season.

== NFL career statistics ==
Legend
| **Bold** | Career high |

=== Regular season ===
| Year | Team | Games | | Rushing | | | | | Receiving | | | | |
| Year | Team | GP | GS | Att | Yds | Avg | Lng | TD | Rec | Yds | Avg | Lng | TD |
|---|---|---|---|---|---|---|---|---|---|---|---|---|---|
| 1973 | CIN | 14 | **14** | **254** | **988** | 3.9 | **26** | **8** | **45** | **347** | 7.7 | **39** | 0 |
| 1974 | CIN | 8 | 8 | 99 | 312 | 3.2 | 22 | 5 | 23 | 194 | 8.4 | 23 | **1** |
| 1975 | CIN | 14 | 13 | 167 | 594 | 3.6 | 17 | 4 | 42 | 334 | 8.0 | 27 | 0 |
| 1976 | CIN | 13 | 9 | 151 | 671 | 4.4 | 24 | 7 | 23 | 158 | 6.9 | 19 | **1** |
| 1977 | CIN | 10 | 4 | 68 | 226 | 3.3 | 10 | 1 | 7 | 33 | 4.7 | 11 | 0 |
| 1978 | CIN | 14 | 6 | 40 | 187 | **4.7** | 20 | 0 | 11 | 73 | 6.6 | 26 | 0 |
| 1979 | HOU | **15** | 0 | 22 | 51 | 2.3 | 7 | 0 | 6 | 58 | **9.7** | 38 | 0 |
| 1980 | HOU | 6 | 0 | 1 | 3 | 3.0 | 3 | 0 | 0 | 0 | 0.0 | 0 | 0 |
| | | 94 | 54 | 802 | 3,032 | 3.8 | 26 | 25 | 157 | 1,197 | 7.6 | 39 | 2 |

=== Playoffs ===
| Year | Team | Games | | Rushing | | | | | Receiving | | | | |
| Year | Team | GP | GS | Att | Yds | Avg | Lng | TD | Rec | Yds | Avg | Lng | TD |
|---|---|---|---|---|---|---|---|---|---|---|---|---|---|
| 1973 | CIN | 1 | **1** | 7 | 40 | 5.7 | **15** | 0 | 2 | 18 | 9.0 | 12 | 0 |
| 1975 | CIN | 1 | **1** | 8 | **46** | **5.8** | 10 | 0 | **4** | **38** | **9.5** | **26** | 0 |
| 1979 | HOU | **3** | 0 | **9** | 30 | 3.3 | 11 | **1** | 0 | 0 | 0.0 | 0 | 0 |
| 1980 | HOU | 1 | 0 | 0 | 0 | 0.0 | 0 | 0 | 0 | 0 | 0.0 | 0 | 0 |
| | | 6 | 2 | 24 | 116 | 4.8 | 15 | 1 | 6 | 56 | 9.3 | 26 | 0 |

== After football ==
Clark died of a blood clot in his lung at the age of 38 on October 25, 1988, at Memorial Hospital in Jacksonville, Florida.

The City of Jacksonville renamed Sherwood Forest Playground as Charles "Boobie" Clark Park and Pool in his honor. In 2000, the Florida Times-Union named Clark number 37 on their list of the top 100 athletes from Jacksonville.

In 2001, he was posthumously inducted into the Bethune-Cookman University Athletic Hall of Fame.
