= Cal Peterson =

American football player (born 1952)

No. 58, 50, 54
- Position: Linebacker

Personal information
- Born: October 6, 1952 (age 74); Los Angeles, California, U.S.
- Listed height: 6 ft 3 in (1.91 m)
- Listed weight: 219 lb (99 kg)

Career information
- High school: Los Angeles
- College: UCLA
- NFL draft: 1974: 3rd round, 72nd overall pick

Career history
- Dallas Cowboys (1974–1975); Tampa Bay Buccaneers (1976); Los Angeles Rams (1978)*; Kansas City Chiefs (1979–1981); Los Angeles Raiders (1982)
- * Offseason or practice squad member only

Awards and highlights
- First-team All-Pac-8 (1973)

Career NFL statistics
- Games played - started: 80 - 17
- Interceptions: 2
- Fumble recoveries: 1
- Stats at Pro Football Reference

Calvin Elston Peterson (born October 6, 1952) is an American former professional football player who was a linebacker in the National Football League (NFL) for the Dallas Cowboys, Tampa Bay Buccaneers, Kansas City Chiefs and Los Angeles Raiders. He played college football for the UCLA Bruins and was selected by the Cowboys in the third round of the 1974 NFL draft.

== Early life ==
Peterson prepped at Los Angeles High School, before moving on to the University of California, Los Angeles, where he played the "loose" defensive end position and was a three-year starter.

== Professional career ==
=== Dallas Cowboys ===
Peterson was selected by the Dallas Cowboys in the third round (72nd overall) of the 1974 NFL draft, with the intention of converting him to an outside linebacker. As a rookie, his speed allowed him to become a key special teams player.

In 1975, he was the fourth linebacker on the depth chart and was used on passing downs, on a team that played in Super Bowl X.

=== Tampa Bay Buccaneers ===
The Tampa Bay Buccaneers selected him from the Cowboys roster in the 1976 NFL expansion draft. He was a starter and considered the team's best linebacker, until suffering a sprained knee in the fourth game of the season. He returned in the eighth game to play against the Denver Broncos, but he reinjured his knee and was placed on the injured reserve list. He could never fully recover from his knee injury and was waived the next off-season after failing a physical.

=== Los Angeles Rams ===
Peterson signed with the Los Angeles Rams in 1978, but was waived before the start of the season.

=== Kansas City Chiefs ===
He signed with the Kansas City Chiefs for the 1979 season and went on to start thirteen games in the span of three years. In 1981, he started the season on the reserve non-football injury list after coming to training camp with a virus that limited him, but recovered to play in 11 games. He was waived before the start of the 1982 season.

=== Los Angeles Raiders ===
In 1982, he played for the Los Angeles Raiders and was active in 4 games.
