= Harold Hart =

American football player (born 1952)

No. 34, 30, 23
- Position: Running back

Personal information
- Born: July 13, 1952 (age 74); Lake City, Florida, U.S.
- Listed height: 6 ft 0 in (1.83 m)
- Listed weight: 206 lb (93 kg)

Career information
- High school: New Stanton (Jacksonville, Florida)
- College: Texas Southern
- NFL draft: 1974: 11th round, 279th overall pick

Career history
- Oakland Raiders (1974–1975); Tampa Bay Buccaneers (1976–1977); New York Giants (1977); Oakland Raiders (1978)

Career NFL statistics
- Rushing attempts: 114
- Rushing yards: 485
- Rushing TDs: 5
- Stats at Pro Football Reference

Harold Jerome Hart (born July 13, 1952) is an American former professional football player who was a running back for four seasons in the National Football League (NFL) with the Oakland Raiders and New York Giants. He was selected by the Raiders in the eleventh round of the 1974 NFL draft. He played college football for the Texas Southern Tigers. Hart was also a member of the Tampa Bay Buccaneers.

== Early life ==
Hart played high school football at New Stanton Senior High School in Jacksonville, Florida. He played his first two years at quarterback before converting to running back. He rushed for 1,900 yards and 13 touchdowns his senior year in 1969. He also earned first-team All-State honors and played in the North-South All-Star game.

== College career ==
Hart was a four-year starter at Texas Southern University, rushing for over 2,000 yards for the Tigers.

== Professional career ==
Hart was selected by the Oakland Raiders in the 11th round with the 279th pick in the 1974 NFL draft. In 1975, he returned a 102-yard kick off for a touchdown in Week 1 of Monday Night Football against the Miami Dolphins

Hart was chosen by the Tampa Bay Buccaneers in the 1976 NFL expansion draft. He missed the 1976 season due to injury and was released before the start of the 1977 season.

Hart played in one game for the New York Giants in 1977.

Hart played in seven games for the Oakland Raiders in 1978.
