= Freddie Douglas =

American football player (born 1954)

No. 84
- Position: Wide receiver

Personal information
- Born: March 28, 1954 (age 72); McGehee, Arkansas, U.S.
- Listed height: 5 ft 9 in (1.75 m)
- Listed weight: 185 lb (84 kg)

Career information
- High school: McGehee (AR)
- College: Arkansas
- NFL draft: 1976: undrafted

Career history
- Pittsburgh Steelers (1976)*; Tampa Bay Buccaneers (1976)
- * Offseason or practice squad member only

Career NFL statistics
- Receptions: 3
- Receiving yards: 58
- Stats at Pro Football Reference

Freddie Joe Douglas (born March 28, 1954) is a former National Football League (NFL) wide receiver who played for the Tampa Bay Buccaneers in 1976. He attended McGehee High School and then the University of Arkansas.

== College Career ==
Douglas was recruited to play running back at Arkansas by head coach Frank Broyles. In 1973, Douglas rushed 118 yards on 23 attempts. He was also used as a receiver out of the backfield, catching 14 passes for 158 yards and a touchdown. With Teddy Barnes and Rolland Fuchs entrenched at running back, Broyles converted Douglas to receiver. That season, he caught 15 passes for 332 yards and three touchdowns, as Arkansas finished 6-4-1. In 1975, Douglas caught 13 passes for 232 yards and no touchdowns. However, Arkansas, with Scott Bull at quarterback, improved to 10 wins and 2 losses and finished the season ranked seventh in the nation.

== Pro career ==
1976 was Freddie Douglas' lone season in the NFL. Douglas played for the expansion Tampa Bay Buccaneers, and made the team as an undrafted free agent. Overall, Douglas' career consist of one start in seven games. He finished the season with three catches for 58 yards.
