= Louis Carter =

American football player (1953–2020)

No. 33, 32
- Position: Running back

Personal information
- Born: February 6, 1953; Laurel, Maryland, U.S.
- Died: October 11, 2020 (aged 67)
- Listed height: 5 ft 11 in (1.80 m)
- Listed weight: 207 lb (94 kg)

Career information
- High school: Arundel (Gambrills, Maryland)
- College: Maryland
- NFL draft: 1975: 3rd round, 76th overall pick

Career history
- Oakland Raiders (1975); Tampa Bay Buccaneers (1976–1978)

Awards and highlights
- 2× First-team All-ACC (1973, 1974)

Career NFL statistics
- Rushing attempts: 322
- Rushing yards: 940
- Rushing TDs: 4
- Stats at Pro Football Reference

Louis Edward Carter (February 6, 1953 – October 11, 2020) was an American professional football player who was a running back in the National Football League (NFL). He played for the Oakland Raiders and the Tampa Bay Buccaneers. Born in Laurel, Maryland, he was a third round pick of the Raiders in 1975 having been the MVP of the Coaches' All-American college all-star game in his senior year at Maryland. He came to the Bucs in the veteran allocation draft of 1976 and became a valuable member of the Buc offense during its first three seasons as a running back and occasional receiver out of the backfield. He also threw the first TD pass in franchise history when he was stopped at the line of scrimmage in a game against the Seahawks and then lobbed the ball across the line to receiver Morris Owens for an unlikely one-yard score. He carried the ball 11 times for 27 yards in his rookie season in Oakland and also had two receptions for 29 yards, but never played again in the NFL after leaving Tampa Bay. After retiring from pro football, Carter sold cars for Covington Buick in Silver Spring, Maryland. When the dealership closed, Carter joined the security team at University of Maryland Global Campus, where he was a security coordinator.

== Career stats ==
College Stats
Season			Rushing				Receiving			
Year	Team	GP	Att	Yds	TD	Y/G	Rec	Yds	TD	Y/G
1972	MD	11	119	474	5	4.0	14	85	1	6.1
1973	MD	11	218	801	14	3.7	12	99	0	8.3
1974	MD	12	246	1056	6	4.3	26	270	1	10.4

NFL Stats
Season				Rushing							Receiving					
Year	Team	GP	GS	Att	Yds	TD	Lng	Y/A	Y/G	A/G	Rec	Yds	TD	Lng	R/G	Y/G
1975	OAK	8	0	11	27	0	11	2.5	3.4	1.4	2	39	0	22	0.3	4.9
1976	TAM	14	8	171	521	1	26	3.0	37.2	12.2	20	135	0	19	1.4	9.6
1977	TAM	14	1	59	117	2	20	2.0	8.4	4.2	10	65	0	19	0.7	4.6
1978	TAM	16	5	81	275	1	17	3.4	17.2	5.1	19	139	0	17	1.2	8.7
