= Charlie Davis (running back) =

American football player (born 1952)

No. 26
- Position: Running back

Personal information
- Born: January 16, 1952 (age 74); West Columbia, Texas, U.S.
- Listed height: 5 ft 11 in (1.80 m)
- Listed weight: 200 lb (91 kg)

Career information
- High school: Columbia (TX)
- College: Colorado
- NFL draft: 1974: 2nd round, 48th overall pick

Career history
- Cincinnati Bengals (1974); Tampa Bay Buccaneers (1976)

Awards and highlights
- Second-team All-American (1972); First-team All-Big Eight (1972); 2× Second-team All-Big Eight (1971, 1973)

Career NFL statistics
- Rushing attempts: 113
- Rushing yards: 482
- Rushing TDs: 1
- Stats at Pro Football Reference

Charles Douglas Davis (born January 16, 1952) is an American former professional football player who was a running back for the Cincinnati Bengals and Tampa Bay Buccaneers of the National Football League (NFL). He played college football for the Colorado Buffaloes and was selected in the second round of the 1974 NFL draft.

He rushed 72 times for 375 yards and caught 19 passes for 171 yards as an NFL rookie with the Bengals, but suffered a preseason knee injury that prevented him from playing in 1975. In 1976, he was traded to the expansion Buccaneers for a future draft choice, which turned out to be a 1977 fourth-rounder. Davis scored the Buccaneers' first-ever offensive touchdown, a 1-yard run in week 4 of the 1976 season against the Baltimore Colts, but later suffered another knee injury and spent the remainder of the 1976 season and the 1977 season on injured reserve.
