= Mike Current =

American football player (1945–2012)

No. 79, 71, 74
- Position: Offensive tackle

Personal information
- Born: September 17, 1945; Lima, Ohio, U.S.
- Died: January 16, 2012 (aged 66); Polk County, Oregon, U.S.
- Listed height: 6 ft 5 in (1.96 m)
- Listed weight: 274 lb (124 kg)

Career information
- High school: Lima (OH)
- College: Ohio State (1963-1966)
- NFL draft: 1967: 3rd round, 58th overall pick

Career history
- Miami Dolphins (1967); Denver Broncos (1967-1975); Tampa Bay Buccaneers (1976); Miami Dolphins (1977–1979)

Awards and highlights
- 1x AFL All-Star (1969)

Career NFL/AFL statistics
- Games played: 169
- Games started: 166
- Fumble recoveries: 7
- Stats at Pro Football Reference

Michael Current (September 17, 1945 – January 16, 2012) was an American football collegiate and professional offensive lineman in the 1960s and 1970s.

== Career ==
=== College ===
A native of Lima, Ohio, Current played left tackle for the Ohio State Buckeyes under head coach Woody Hayes. After backing up All American Jim Davidson as a sophomore, Current became a starter as a junior in 1965. Prior to his senior year, he was named a team co-captain, along with defensive back John Fill and center Ray Pryor.

=== Professional ===
Current was selected in the third round of the 1967 AFL/NFL common draft by the American Football League's Denver Broncos. He was traded to the AFL's Miami Dolphins where he played for two games before being traded back to the Broncos. He played with the AFL Broncos from 1967 through 1969 and for the NFL Broncos from 1970 through 1975. He was picked up by the NFL Tampa Bay Buccaneers in the 1976 veteran allocation draft, and returned to the NFL Dolphins from 1977 through 1979.

== Personal life ==
Current had three sons, Justin Current who currently lives in Aurora, Colorado and works for Arrow in the Denver Tech Center, JT Current who lives in New Berlin, Wisconsin and works for 1st Advantage Mortgage a Draper and Kramer Company, and Anthony Current who lives in Des Moines, Iowa. Current filed for bankruptcy November 29, 2010, listing his home in the 500 block of Lone Oak Loop in Silverton as an asset. According to the filing, he owed between $500,000 and $1 million. A federal order filed in January 2012 authorized a bank to foreclose on his home in Silverton. He also owned a home in Silverton, in Marion County, Oregon, that was in foreclosure at the time of his death. Current previously resided in Silverton starting in 2002 where he was a bus driver from 2003 until 2010 and a Pop Warner Football coach. He wrote two books, Rememberin' Life in the Trenches and Bush Justice, which were both self-published.

== Death ==
On January 16, 2012, Current committed suicide by shooting himself in the head with a 20 gauge shotgun at the scenic outlook at Baskett Slough National Wildlife Refuge near Dallas, Oregon. Current was accused of sexually assaulting three victims, two girls and one boy, all aged 14 or younger, at least five times between 2004 and 2010 in Marion County, Oregon. He allegedly used pornography, such as videos and photos, to elicit sex from the children.

On January 17, 2012, Current was set to enter a plea on the charges. He faced a minimum of six years and three months for each of the five sex-abuse charges, a total of more than 30 years without parole, and no chance at reduced time. The Silverton Police Department had been looking into Current since June 17 and were investigating the possibility of other victims. Tara Lawrence, the attorney for the victims, indicated that she would be pursuing justice through the civil courts since Current's suicide did not allow the victims to get their day in court. "Our hope is that with Current's death, any additional victims may feel empowered to break their silence and speak out about their own abuse", Lawrence said.
