= Council Rudolph =

American football player (born 1950)

No. 77, 74, 78
- Position: Defensive end

Personal information
- Born: January 18, 1950 (age 76); Anniston, Alabama, U.S.
- Listed height: 6 ft 4 in (1.93 m)
- Listed weight: 255 lb (116 kg)

Career information
- High school: Cobb (Anniston)
- College: Kentucky State
- NFL draft: 1972: 7th round, 160th overall pick

Career history
- Houston Oilers (1972); St. Louis Cardinals (1973–1975); Tampa Bay Buccaneers (1976–1977)

Career NFL statistics
- Games played – started: 72 – 41
- Interceptions: 1
- Fumble recoveries: 3
- Stats at Pro Football Reference

Council Rudolph Jr. (born January 18, 1950) is an American former professional football player who was a defensive end in the National Football League (NFL). He played college football for the Kentucky State Thorobreds.

== Career ==
Rudolph played defensive end for six seasons for the Houston Oilers, the St. Louis Cardinals, and the Tampa Bay Buccaneers. Council attended Kentucky State University, where he is in the Hall of Fame. Council was also inducted into the Calhoun County Sports Hall of Fame in 2009.

== After football ==
In 1982, Rudolph opened The Check Casher, the first check cashing business in Tampa, Florida. Rudolph was inducted into the Kentucky Pro Football Hall of Fame in 2016.
