= Barry Smith (American football) =

American football player (born 1951)

No. 80, 88
- Position: Wide receiver

Personal information
- Born: January 15, 1951 (age 75); West Palm Beach, Florida, U.S.
- Listed height: 6 ft 1 in (1.85 m)
- Listed weight: 190 lb (86 kg)

Career information
- High school: Coral Park
- College: Florida State
- NFL draft: 1973: 1st round, 21st overall pick

Career history
- Green Bay Packers (1973–1975); Tampa Bay Buccaneers (1976)

Awards and highlights
- First-team All-American (1972)

Career NFL statistics
- Receptions: 45
- Receiving yards: 692
- Receiving touchdowns: 4
- Stats at Pro Football Reference

Barrett Benjamin Smith is an American former professional football player who was a wide receiver in the National Football League (NFL) who played 42 games for the Green Bay Packers. In 1973, the Green Bay Packers used the 21st pick in the 1st round of the 1973 NFL draft to sign Smith out of the Florida State University. He went on to play for three seasons with the Packers and one season with the Tampa Bay Buccaneers.
