= Dave Reavis =

American football player (born 1950)

No. 74, 75
- Position: Tackle / Guard

Personal information
- Born: June 19, 1950 (age 76); Nashville, Tennessee, U.S.
- Listed height: 6 ft 5 in (1.96 m)
- Listed weight: 257 lb (117 kg)

Career information
- High school: Trussville (AL) Hewitt-Trussville
- College: Arkansas
- NFL draft: 1973: 5th round, 106th overall pick

Career history
- Pittsburgh Steelers (1974–1975); Tampa Bay Buccaneers (1976–1983)

Awards and highlights
- 2× Super Bowl champion (IX, X)

Career NFL statistics
- Games played: 121
- Fumble recoveries: 2
- Stats at Pro Football Reference

David Craig Reavis (born June 19, 1950) is an American former professional football player who was an offensive lineman in the National Football League (NFL) from 1974 to 1983. He earned two Super Bowl rings with the Pittsburgh Steelers. He played college football for the Arkansas Razorbacks.

In 1983 Reavis helped evacuate United Airlines Flight 200 at O'Hare International Airport. After an engine exploded during takeoff, he "ripped open the exit door, stowed it to one side", and led other passengers out of the Boeing 727, a fellow passenger said.
