= Doug Swift =

American football player (born 1948)

No. 59
- Position: Linebacker

Personal information
- Born: October 24, 1948 (age 78); Syracuse, New York, U.S.
- Listed height: 6 ft 3 in (1.91 m)
- Listed weight: 226 lb (103 kg)

Career information
- High school: Nottingham (Syracuse, New York)
- College: Amherst
- NFL draft: 1970: undrafted

Career history
- Miami Dolphins (1970–1975)

Career NFL statistics
- Sacks: 4.5
- Fumble recoveries: 4
- Interceptions: 5
- Stats at Pro Football Reference

Douglas A. Swift (born October 24, 1948) is an American former professional football player who was a linebacker for six seasons with the Miami Dolphins of the National Football League (NFL). Swift moved into the starting lineup as a rookie and held the strongside linebacker position for the next six seasons, including the Dolphins' Super Bowl victories following the 1972 and 1973 seasons. Swift's blitz late in the second quarter of Super Bowl VII forced Washington Redskins quarterback Billy Kilmer to make a hurried throw, which Nick Buoniconti intercepted and returned into Washington territory to set up the Dolphins' second touchdown in a 14–7 victory, cementing Miami's 17–0 season. Made available in the 1976 NFL expansion draft, he chose to retire from football and enter medical school rather than report to the expansion Tampa Bay Buccaneers.

He is a graduate of both Nottingham High School and Amherst College (1970). Swift is an anesthesiologist in Philadelphia.
