= Jack Novak =

American football player (born 1953)

No. 89, 80
- Position: Tight end

Personal information
- Born: June 6, 1953 (age 73); Kewaunee, Wisconsin, U.S.
- Listed height: 6 ft 4 in (1.93 m)
- Listed weight: 242 lb (110 kg)

Career information
- High school: Kewaunee
- College: Wisconsin
- NFL draft: 1975: 12th round, 301st overall pick

Career history
- Cincinnati Bengals (1975); Tampa Bay Buccaneers (1976–1977)

Awards and highlights
- First-team All-Big Ten (1974)

Career NFL statistics
- Receptions: 12
- Receiving yards: 188
- Receiving TDs: 1
- Stats at Pro Football Reference

Clarence John Novak (born June 6, 1953) is an American former professional football player who played tight end in the National Football League (NFL) for the Cincinnati Bengals and Tampa Bay Buccaneers from 1975 to 1977.

== Early life ==
Novak played football and basketball at Kewaunee High School, from which he graduated in 1971. During his senior season, he led the team to an undefeated season. He was named to the UPI All-State Team.

== College career ==
In March 1971 as a high school senior, he announced he would attend the University of Wisconsin–Madison. He played college football for three seasons for the Badgers.

In those three season, he played 33 games at tight end for the Badgers, with career totals of 49 receptions for 965 yards and six touchdowns.

== Professional career ==
Novak was drafted 301st overall in the 12th round of the 1975 NFL draft by the Cincinnati Bengals.

During his rookie season of 1975, he played in all 14 games, primarily on special teams and as a backup tight end. He totaled two receptions for 34 yards (a 17.0 average) for the season.

On September 7, 1976, Novak signed with the expansion Tampa Bay Buccaneers. That season, he played in 12 games, starting one at tight end, and had his most productive season with eight receptions for 130 yards (a 16.3 average) and one touchdown. His lone career touchdown came on a 30-yard pass from quarterback Steve Spurrier in a 28-19 loss to the Kansas City Chiefs. It was also his longest career reception.

His third and final NFL season was 1977 for the Bucs, in which he played nine games, starting two, with two receptions for 24 yards (a 12.0 average).

== Personal life ==
He is president of the Novak Insurance and Real Estate Agency in Kewaunee, Wisconsin. He also assists coaching the Kewaunee High School football team. A plaque on the school's Wall of Fame commemorates his career. He resides in Kewaunee with his wife, Merrie, and has 8 grandchildren. A lot of his grandchildren play sports, in which he attends the events.
