= Maulty Moore =

American football player (born 1946)

No. 65
- Position: Defensive tackle

Personal information
- Born: August 12, 1946 (age 80); Milligan, Florida, U.S.
- Listed height: 6 ft 5 in (1.96 m)
- Listed weight: 265 lb (120 kg)

Career information
- High school: Moton (Brooksville, Florida)
- College: Bethune-Cookman
- NFL draft: 1970: undrafted

Career history
- Miami Dolphins (1971–1974); Cincinnati Bengals (1975); Tampa Bay Buccaneers (1976)

Career NFL statistics
- Games played: 58
- Games started: 1
- Fumbles recovered: 1
- Stats at Pro Football Reference

Maulty Moore (born August 12, 1946) is an American former professional football player who was a defensive tackle for five seasons with the Miami Dolphins, Cincinnati Bengals, and Tampa Bay Buccaneers of the National Football League (NFL). Undrafted after playing college football for the Bethune–Cookman Wildcats, he began a year of conditioning that added 50 pounds to his undersized frame before trying out for the Dolphins as a free agent. He was signed to the Dolphins' taxi squad in 1971, and promoted to special teams the next year. He blocked a Roy Gerela field goal attempt during the Dolphins' 1972 AFC Championship Game victory over the Pittsburgh Steelers. Waived by the Dolphins in 1975, he spent a year with the Bengals before finishing his career in 1976 with the then expansion Tampa Bay Buccaneers. Moore went on to teach in the Broward County school system.
