= Ricky Davis (American football) =

American gridiron football player (born 1953)

No. 27, 40
- Position: Defensive back

Personal information
- Born: May 18, 1953 (age 73); Birmingham, Alabama, U.S.
- Listed height: 6 ft 1 in (1.85 m)
- Listed weight: 179 lb (81 kg)

Career information
- College: Alabama
- NFL draft: 1975: 8th round, 195th overall pick

Career history
- Cincinnati Bengals (1975); Tampa Bay Buccaneers (1976); Kansas City Chiefs (1977)

Awards and highlights
- National champion (1973); First-team All-SEC (1974)

Career NFL statistics
- Interceptions: 1
- Fumble recoveries: 1
- Stats at Pro Football Reference

Richard Terrell Davis (born May 18, 1953) is an American former professional football player who was a defensive back from 1975 to 1978 for the Cincinnati Bengals, Tampa Bay Buccaneers and Kansas City Chiefs of the National Football League (NFL). He attended Jess Lanier High School and played college football for the Alabama Crimson Tide. He was selected by the Cincinnati Bengals in the eighth round pick of the 1975 NFL draft.
