= Howard Fest =

American football player (born 1946)

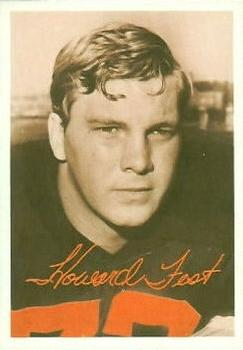
- Fest in 1969

No. 72
- Positions: Tackle, Guard

Personal information
- Born: April 11, 1946 (age 80); San Antonio, Texas, U.S.
- Listed height: 6 ft 6 in (1.98 m)
- Listed weight: 262 lb (119 kg)

Career information
- High school: Edison (San Antonio)
- College: Texas (1966-1967)
- NFL draft: 1968: 6th round, 139th overall pick

Career history
- Cincinnati Bengals (1968-1975); Tampa Bay Buccaneers (1976–1977)

Career NFL/AFL statistics
- Games played: 127
- Games started: 107
- Fumble recoveries: 3
- Stats at Pro Football Reference

Howard Arthur Fest (born April 11, 1946) is an American former professional football player who was an offensive lineman in the American Football League (AFL) and National Football League (NFL).

He attended Thomas Edison High School in San Antonio. He played college football at the University of Texas, where he was a tight end. As a sophomore during the 1965 season, he played sparingly and caught one pass for nine yards as the Longhorns went 6-4 under College Football Hall of Fame coach Darrell Royal. In his junior year he was switched to offensive tackle as the Longhorns went 7-4, including a 19-0 win in the Bluebonnet Bowl over Ole Miss. In his senior season of 1967, the Longhorns were 6-4.

After his senior year, he was chosen in the sixth round (139th overall) of the 1968 NFL/AFL Draft by the Cincinnati Bengals.

He was an original member of the AFL Cincinnati Bengals, playing with them for eight years. He began his career at tackle, but later moved to guard. He was given the nickname "Mr. Consistency" by his teammates.

During his eight seasons with the Bengals, he never missed a game, playing in 112 games, of which he started 63.

He was made available in the 1976 NFL expansion draft, and was selected by the Tampa Bay Buccaneers, where he played two seasons. He started all 14 games of the 1976 season. He played in just one game his final season of 1977.
