= Ed Williams (running back) =

American football player (born 1950)

No. 43
- Position: Fullback

Personal information
- Born: June 19, 1950 (age 76); Oklahoma City, Oklahoma, U.S.
- Listed height: 6 ft 2 in (1.88 m)
- Listed weight: 245 lb (111 kg)

Career information
- College: Langston
- NFL draft: 1973: undrafted

Career history
- Cincinnati Bengals (1973–1975); Tampa Bay Buccaneers (1976–1977)

Career NFL statistics
- Rushing attempts: 243
- Rushing yards: 896
- Rushing TDs: 7
- Stats at Pro Football Reference

Edward Lee Williams (born June 19, 1950) is an American former professional football player who was a running back for four seasons for the Cincinnati Bengals and Tampa Bay Buccaneers of the National Football League (NFL). He played college football for the Langston Lions.
