= 1968 Cincinnati Bengals season =

NFL team season (inaugural season)

- Head coach: Paul Brown
- Home stadium: Nippert Stadium

Results
- Record: 3–11
- Division place: 5th AFL West
- Playoffs: Did not qualify
- AFL All-Stars: 3: C Bob Johnson; TE Bob Trumpy; RB Paul Robinson
- Team ROY: Paul Robinson

The 1968 Cincinnati Bengals season was the franchise's inaugural season. Their head coach was Paul Brown, who left the Cleveland Browns following the 1962 season with National Football League (NFL) record of 115–49–6, seven conference titles, and three NFL championships. His son Mike Brown did a study on pro football expansion and recommended Cincinnati as a potential site. In 1965, Brown met with Governor of Ohio James Rhodes and the two agreed the state could accommodate a second pro football team. The team recorded its first win in franchise history in week 2 with a 24–10 victory over the Denver Broncos.

== Timeline to establishment ==
- 1966 – Fearful the Cincinnati Reds baseball team would leave town and feeling pressure from local businessmen pushing for a pro football franchise, Cincinnati's city council approved the construction of Riverfront Stadium.
- 1967 – Brown's group was awarded an American Football League (AFL) expansion franchise. Brown named the team the Bengals, the name of Cincinnati's pro teams in the old AFL of the late 1930s. The Bengals acquired their first player late in the year when they traded two draft picks to Miami for quarterback John Stofa.
- 1968 preseason – The Bengals were awarded 40 veteran players in an expansion draft, held in mid-January 1968. In the 1968 NFL/AFL draft of college players, held in late January, they selected University of Tennessee center Bob Johnson as their first pick. The Bengals lost their first preseason game, 38–14, to the Kansas City Chiefs before 21,682 fans at the University of Cincinnati's Nippert Stadium.
- 1968 regular season – The Bengals upset the Denver Broncos, 24–10, and the Buffalo Bills, 34–23, in their first two regular-season home games. Halfback Paul Robinson led the AFL in rushing with 1,023 yards and was named Rookie of the Year.

== Offseason ==
=== Common draft ===
1968 Cincinnati Bengals draft
Round	Pick	Player	Position	College	Notes
1	2	Bob Johnson *	Center	Tennessee	
2	28	Bill Staley	Defensive end	Utah State	
2	55	Tom Smiley	Running back	Lamar	
3	56	Gary Davis	Quarterback	Vanderbilt	
3	82	Paul Robinson *	Running back	Arizona	
3	83	Dale Livingston	Placekicker	Western Michigan	
4	84	Jess Phillips	Defensive back	Michigan State	
4	109	Warren McVea	Running back	Houston	
5	112	Dave Middendorf	Guard	Washington State	
5	138	Al Beauchamp	Linebacker	Southern	
6	139	Howard Fest	Offensive tackle	Texas	
6	143	Bill Kindricks	Defensive tackle	Alabama A&M	
6	145	John Neidert	Linebacker	Louisville	
6	155	Dewey Warren	Quarterback	Tennessee	
6	156	Essex Johnson	Defensive back	Grambling State	
6	158	Elmo Maple	Wide receiver	Southern	
6	160	Sidney Ellis	Defensive back	Jackson State	
6	163	Charles Williams	Running back	Arkansas–Pine Bluff	
6	165	Jim Johnson	Defensive back	South Carolina State	
7	166	Steve Smith	Tight end	Miami (FL)	
7	192	Wes Bean	Linebacker	Grambling State	
8	193	Harry Gunner	Linebacker	Oregon State	
8	219	Ed Brantley	Offensive tackle	North Texas	
9	220	Phil Johnson	Defensive back	Long Beach State	
9	246	Steve Hanrahan	Defensive tackle	Weber State	
10	247	Wayne Patrick	Running back	Louisville	
10	273	James Russell	Wide receiver	North Texas	
11	274	Wally Scott	Defensive back	Arizona	
11	300	Jeff Banks	Linebacker	Pacific	
12	301	Bob Trumpy *	Tight end	Utah	
12	327	Harold Jones	Offensive tackle	Grambling State	
13	328	James Bivins	Linebacker	Texas Southern	
13	354	Teddy Washington	Running back	San Diego State	
14	355	Les Webster	Running back	Iowa State	
14	381	Steve Lewicke	Wide receiver	UTEP	
15	382	Harvey Palmore	Guard	Morgan State	
15	408	Joe Mira	Wide receiver	Miami (FL)	
16	409	James Williams	Defensive back	Alcorn State	
16	435	Brown Marks	Linebacker	Indiana (PA)	
17	436	Don Manning	Linebacker	UCLA	
17	462	Jimmy Smith	Tight end	Jackson State	
Made roster * Made at least one Pro Bowl during career

== Personnel ==
=== Staff/Coaches ===
1968 Cincinnati Bengals staff
Front office: Owner/CEO & PRESIDENT - Paul Brown; Coaching Staff: Head coach – Paul Brown; Offensive coaches: Offensive line – Bill Johnson; Offensive backs - Rick Forzano; Receivers/offensive ends - Bill Walsh	Defensive coaches: Defensive line - Jack Donaldson; Defensive coordinator / defensive backs – Tom Bass; Linebackers – Frank Smouse

=== Final roster ===
1968 Cincinnati Bengals roster
Quarterbacks (QB): 15 John Stofa; 16 Dewey Warren; 14 Sam Wyche; Running backs (RB): 38 Estes Banks; 19 Essex Johnson; 40 Ron Lamb; 18 Paul Robinson; Wide receivers (WR): 82 Ed McCall; 27 S. T. Saffold; 23 Rod Sherman K; Tight ends (TE): 34 Ken Herock; 84 Bob Trumpy	Offensive linemen (OL): 72 Howard Fest T; 54 Bob Johnson C; 77 Bob Kelly T; 52 John Matlock C; 73 Pat Matson G; 68 Dave Middendorf G; 64 Pete Perreault G; 75 Ernie Wright T; Defensive linemen (DL): 85 Martin Baccaglio DE; 79 Steve Chomyszak DT; 76 Jim Griffin DE; 89 Harry Gunner DE; 65 Bill Kindricks DT; 81 Dennis Randall DE; 70 Andy Rice DT; 83 Bill Staley DT	Linebackers (LB): 58 Al Beauchamp OLB; 85 Danny Brabham OLB; 55 Frank Buncom OLB; 52 Paul Elzey MLB; 50 Bernie Erickson MLB; 69 Sherrill Headrick MLB; 56 Mike Hibler MLB; 53 Bill Peterson OLB; 66 Wayne McClure OLB; Defensive backs (DB): 43 Curt Frazier FS; 20 Bobby Hunt FS; 47 Charlie King CB; 30 Jess Phillips SS; 37 Bill Scott CB; 31 Fletcher Smith CB; 48 Phil Spiller SS; Special teams (ST): 44 Rex Keeling P	Reserve: -- Gary Bugenhagen T (Military); 11 Dale Livingston K/P (Military); 42 Warren McVea WR (Military); 45 Tom Smiley RB (Military); -- Jim Williams S (Military); Rookies in italics

== Preseason ==
Week	Date	Opponent	Result	Record	Venue	Attendance
1	August 3	Kansas City Chiefs	L 14–38	0–1	Nippert Stadium	21,682
2	August 10	at Denver Broncos	L 13–15	0–2	Denver University Stadium	13,841
3	August 17	Buffalo Bills	L 6–10	0–3	Nippert Stadium	20,111
4	August 25	Pittsburgh Steelers	W 19–3	1–3	Old Mountaineer Field	11,500
5	August 30	New York Jets	W 13–9	2–3	Memphis Memorial Stadium	24,358

== Regular season ==
=== Schedule ===
Week	Date	Opponent	Result	Record	Venue	Attendance	Recap
1	September 6	at **San Diego Chargers**	**L** 13–29	0–1	San Diego Stadium	33,687	Recap
2	September 15	**Denver Broncos**	**W** 24–10	1–1	Nippert Stadium	25,049	Recap
3	September 22	Buffalo Bills	**W** 34–23	2–1	Nippert Stadium	24,045	Recap
4	September 29	**San Diego Chargers**	**L** 10–31	2–2	Nippert Stadium	28,642	Recap
5	October 6	at **Denver Broncos**	**L** 7–10	2–3	Mile High Stadium	41,257	Recap
6	October 13	at **Kansas City Chiefs**	**L** 3–13	2–4	Municipal Stadium	47,096	Recap
7	October 20	Miami Dolphins	**L** 22–24	2–5	Nippert Stadium	25,942	Recap
8	October 27	at **Oakland Raiders**	**L** 10–31	2–6	Oakland–Alameda County Coliseum	37,083	Recap
9	November 3	Houston Oilers	**L** 17–27	2–7	Nippert Stadium	24,012	Recap
10	November 10	**Kansas City Chiefs**	**L** 9–16	2–8	Nippert Stadium	25,537	Recap
11	November 17	at Miami Dolphins	**W** 38–21	3–8	Miami Orange Bowl	31,747	Recap
12	November 24	**Oakland Raiders**	**L** 0–34	3–9	Nippert Stadium	27,116	Recap
13	December 1	at Boston Patriots	**L** 14–33	3–10	Fenway Park	17,796	Recap
14	December 8	at New York Jets	**L** 14–27	3–11	Shea Stadium	61,111	Recap
Note: Intra-division opponents are in **bold** text.

== Standings ==
AFL Western Division
	W	L	T	PCT	DIV	PF	PA	STK
Oakland Raiders	12	2	0	.857	6–2	453	233	W8
Kansas City Chiefs	12	2	0	.857	7–1	371	170	W5
San Diego Chargers	9	5	0	.643	5–3	382	310	L2
Denver Broncos	5	9	0	.357	1–7	275	404	L3
Cincinnati Bengals	3	11	0	.214	1–7	215	329	L3

Note: Tie games were not officially counted in the standings in the AFL.

== Game summaries ==
=== Week 1 ===
- Friday September 6, 1968

	1	2	3	4	Total
Bengals	7	3	3	0	13
Chargers	10	0	13	6	29

at San Diego Stadium, San Diego, California

- Game time:
- Game weather:
- Game attendance:
- Referee:
- TV announcers:

		CIN	SDG
CIN	Paul Robinson 2-yard rush (Dale Livingston kick)	7	0
SDG	Dennis Partee 42-yard field goal	7	3
SDG	Dickie Post 48-yard rush (Dennis Partee kick)	7	10
CIN	Dale Livingston 22-yard field goal	10	10
SDG	Brad Hubbert 1-yard rush (Dennis Partee kick)	10	17
CIN	Dale Livingston 35-yard field goal	13	17
SDG	Willie Frazier 48-yard pass from John Hadl (kick failed)	13	23
SDG	Willie Frazier 56-yard pass from John Hadl (kick failed)	13	29

	CIN	SDG
First downs	13	27
Rush-yards-TDs	30–122–1	33–229–2
Comp-Att-Yd-TD-INT	14–26–125–0–1	20–37–325–2–0
Sacked-yards	2–21	0–0
Net pass yards	104	325
Total yards	226	554
Fumbles-lost	4–1	2–2
Turnovers	2	2
Penalties-yards	5–56	10–100

=== Week 2 ===
- Sunday September 15

Week 2
	1	2	3	4	Final
Denver Broncos (0–1–0)	0	0	3	7	10
Cincinnati Bengals (1–1–0)	0	0	10	14	24

		DEN	CIN
CIN	Dale Livingston 49-yard field goal	0	3
CIN	Bob Trumpy 58-yard pass from John Stofa (Dale Livingston kick)	0	10
DEN	Bob Humphreys 33-yard field goal	3	10
DEN	Eric Crabtree 5-yard pass from Jim M. LeClair (Bob Humphreys kick)	10	10
CIN	Warren McVea 54-yard pass from John Stofa (Dale Livingston kick)	10	17
CIN	Essex Johnson 35-yard rush (Dale Livingston kick)	10	24

	DEN	CIN
First downs	15	11
Rush-yards-TDs	25–78–0	27–104–1
Comp-Att-Yd-TD-INT	14–33–171–1–1	12–22–224–2–0
Sacked-yards	4–50	3–39
Net pass yards	121	185
Total yards	199	289
Fumbles-lost	2–0	1–0
Turnovers	1	0
Penalties-yards	2–15	2–24

=== Week 3 ===
- Sunday September 22

Week 3
	1	2	3	4	Final
Buffalo Bills (0–3–0)	0	7	7	9	23
Cincinnati Bengals (2–1–0)	10	0	10	14	34

	BUF	CIN
CIN Dale Livingston 11-yard field goal	0	3
CIN Warren McVea 80-yard rush (Dale Livingston kick)	0	10
BUF Max Anderson 14-yard rush (Mike Mercer kick)	7	10
BUF Gary McDermott 5-yard rush (Mike Mercer kick)	14	10
CIN Dale Livingston 39-yard field goal	14	13
CIN Charlie King 32-yard interception return (Dale Livingston kick)	14	20
CIN Al Beauchamp 17-yard interception return (Dale Livingston kick)	14	27
BUF Max Anderson 100-yard kickoff return (Mike Mercer kick)	21	27
BUF Safety, Robinson tackled in end zone	23	27
CIN Tommie Smiley 1-yard rush (Dale Livingston kick)	23	34

	BUF	CIN
First downs	17	9
Rush-yards-TDs	24–92–2	29–149–2
Comp-Att-Yd-TD-INT	15–36–160–0–2	8–18–68–0–1
Sacked-yards	5–37	2–16
Net pass yards	123	52
Total yards	215	201
Fumbles-lost	1–0	2–1
Turnovers	2	2
Penalties-yards	5–65	6–34

=== Week 4 ===
Sunday September 29

Week 4
	1	2	3	4	Final
San Diego Chargers (3–0–0)	0	17	0	14	31
Cincinnati Bengals (2–2–0)	3	0	7	0	10

	SDG	CIN
CIN Dale Livingston 21-yard field goal	0	3
SDG Gary Garrison 10-yard pass from John Hadl (Dennis Partee kick)	7	3
SDG Dennis Partee 21-yard field goal	10	3
SDG Gary Garrison 19-yard pass from John Hadl (Dennis Partee kick)	17	3
CIN Essex Johnson 6-yard rush (Dale Livingston kick)	17	10
SDG John Hadl 2-yard rush (Dennis Partee kick)	24	10
SDG John Hadl 1-yard rush (Dennis Partee kick)	31	10

	SDG	CIN
First downs	18	14
Rush-yards-TDs	37–101–2	25–66–1
Comp-Att-Yd-TD-INT	11–24–215–2–1	17–29–153–0–2
Sacked-yards	1–14	3–24
Net pass yards	201	129
Total yards	302	195
Fumbles-lost	0–0	0–0
Turnovers	1	2
Penalties-yards	6–51	8–90

=== Week 5 ===
Sunday October 6

Week 5
	1	2	3	4	Final
Cincinnati Bengals (2–3–0)	0	7	0	0	7
Denver Broncos (1–3–0)	0	0	3	7	10

	CIN	DEN
CIN Bobby Hunt 5-yard rush (Dale Livingston kick)	7	0
DEN Bobby Howfield 34-yard field goal	7	3
DEN Mike Haffner 4-yard pass from Steve Tensi (Bobby Howfield kick)	7	10

	CIN	DEN
First downs	15	11
Rush-yards-TDs	37–111–1	23–99–0
Comp-Att-Yd-TD-INT	15–38–139–0–0	14–34–125–1–0
Sacked-yards	1–3	2–13
Net pass yards	136	112
Total yards	247	211
Fumbles-lost	3–1	1–0
Turnovers	1	0
Penalties-yards	5–49	3–28

=== Week 6 ===
Sunday October 13

Week 6
	1	2	3	4	Final
Cincinnati Bengals (2–4–0)	0	0	3	0	3
Kansas City Chiefs (5–1–0)	0	3	3	7	13

	CIN	KAN
KAN Jan Stenerud 52-yard field goal	0	3
CIN Dale Livingston 15-yard field goal	3	3
KAN Jan Stenerud 46-yard field goal	3	6
KAN Robert Holmes 1-yard rush (Jan Stenerud kick)	3	13

	CIN	KAN
First downs	7	15
Rush-yards-TDs	28–99–0	40–136–1
Comp-Att-Yd-TD-INT	7–19–48–0–1	11–17–152–0–1
Sacked-yards	3–31	3–23
Net pass yards	17	129
Total yards	116	265
Fumbles-lost	1–0	2–1
Turnovers	1	2
Penalties-yards	3–25	5–42

=== Week 7 ===
Sunday October 20

Week 7
	1	2	3	4	Final
Miami Dolphins (2–3–1)	10	0	0	14	24
Cincinnati Bengals (2–5–0)	0	2	14	6	22

	MIA	CIN
MIA Jimmy Keyes 26-yard field goal	3	0
MIA Karl Noonan 2-yard pass from Bob Griese (Jimmy Keyes kick)	10	0
CIN Safety, Gunner tackled Griese in end zone	10	2
CIN Essex Johnson 41-yard rush (Dale Livingston kick)	10	9
CIN Paul Robinson 1-yard rush (Dale Livingston kick)	10	16
MIA Karl Noonan 20-yard pass from Bob Griese (Jimmy Keyes kick)	17	16
MIA Stan Mitchell 31-yard pass from Bob Griese (Jimmy Keyes kick)	24	16
CIN Bob Trumpy 45-yard pass from Dewey Warren (pass failed)	24	22

	MIA	CIN
First downs	21	14
Rush-yards-TDs	38–139–0	30–143–2
Comp-Att-Yd-TD-INT	16–29–186–3–0	14–21–184–1–1
Sacked-yards	4–29	0–0
Net pass yards	157	184
Total yards	296	327
Fumbles-lost	1–0	3–2
Turnovers	0	3
Penalties-yards	2–11	2–10

=== Week 8 ===
Sunday October 28

Week 8
	1	2	3	4	Final
Cincinnati Bengals (2–6–0)	0	7	3	0	10
Oakland Raiders (5–2–0)	7	7	14	3	31

	CIN	OAK
OAK Fred Biletnikoff 14-yard pass from Daryle Lamonica (George Blanda kick)	0	7
OAK Roger Hagberg 7-yard rush (George Blanda kick)	0	14
CIN Paul Robinson 87-yard rush (Dale Livingston kick)	7	14
OAK Fred Biletnikoff 12-yard pass from Daryle Lamonica (George Blanda kick)	7	21
CIN Dale Livingston 37-yard field goal	10	21
OAK Roger Hagberg 7-yard pass from Daryle Lamonica (George Blanda kick)	10	28
OAK George Blanda 48-yard field goal	10	31

	CIN	OAK
First downs	8	26
Rush-yards-TDs	28–169–1	42–265–1
Comp-Att-Yd-TD-INT	11–19–95–0–1	17–34–205–3–1
Sacked-yards	7–36	4–31
Net pass yards	59	174
Total yards	228	439
Fumbles-lost	3–1	2–2
Turnovers	2	3
Penalties-yards	6–90	5–78

=== Week 9 ===
Sunday November 3

Week 9
	1	2	3	4	Final
Houston Oilers (4–5–0)	10	7	7	3	27
Cincinnati Bengals (2–7–0)	0	3	7	7	17

	HOU	CIN
HOU Wayne Walker 27-yard field goal	3	0
HOU Alvin Reed 5-yard pass from Don Trull (Wayne Walker kick)	10	0
CIN Dale Livingston 28-yard field goal	10	3
HOU Hoyle Granger 1-yard rush (Wayne Walker kick)	17	3
CIN Paul Robinson 4-yard rush (Dale Livingston kick)	17	10
HOU Mac Haik 10-yard pass from Don Trull (Wayne Walker kick)	24	10
HOU Wayne Walker 41-yard field goal	27	10
CIN Paul Robinson 68-yard pass from Sam Wyche (Dale Livingston kick)	27	17

	HOU	CIN
First downs	21	21
Rush-yards-TDs	37–159–1	26–179–1
Comp-Att-Yd-TD-INT	14–23–212–2–0	20–25–228–1–0
Sacked-yards	1–10	5–33
Net pass yards	202	195
Total yards	361	374
Fumbles-lost	1–0	1–0
Turnovers	0	0
Penalties-yards	3–35	4–45

=== Week 10 ===
Sunday November 10

Week 10
	1	2	3	4	Final
Kansas City Chiefs (8–2–0)	3	3	0	10	16
Cincinnati Bengals (2–8–0)	0	3	6	0	9

	KAN	CIN
KAN Jan Stenerud 30-yard field goal	3	0
CIN Dale Livingston 29-yard field goal	3	3
KAN Jan Stenerud 11-yard field goal	6	3
CIN Dale Livingston 16-yard field goal	6	6
CIN Dale Livingston 23-yard field goal	6	9
KAN Jan Stenerud 17-yard field goal	9	9
KAN Robert Holmes 27-yard rush (Jan Stenerud kick)	16	9

	KAN	CIN
First downs	16	15
Rush-yards-TDs	39–255–1	30–157–0
Comp-Att-Yd-TD-INT	5–15–62–0–1	12–21–161–0–2
Sacked-yards	1–13	6–35
Net pass yards	49	126
Total yards	304	283
Fumbles-lost	0–0	0–0
Turnovers	1	2
Penalties-yards	4–45	3–44

=== Week 11 ===
Sunday, November 17

Week 11
	1	2	3	4	Final
Cincinnati Bengals (3–8–0)	0	17	0	21	38
Miami Dolphins (3–6–1)	7	0	14	0	21

	CIN	MIA
MIA Stan Mitchell 48-yard pass from Bob Griese (Jimmy Keyes kick)	0	7
CIN Bob Trumpy 80-yard pass from Sam Wyche (Dale Livingston kick)	7	7
CIN Dale Livingston 12-yard field goal	10	7
CIN Paul Robinson 54-yard rush (Dale Livingston kick)	17	7
MIA Karl Noonan 7-yard pass from Bob Griese (Jimmy Keyes kick)	17	14
MIA Stan Mitchell 38-yard pass from Bob Griese (Jimmy Keyes kick)	17	21
CIN Warren McVea 55-yard pass from John Stofa (Dale Livingston kick)	24	21
CIN Paul Robinson 15-yard rush (Dale Livingston kick)	31	21
CIN Paul Robinson 5-yard rush (Dale Livingston kick)	38	21

	CIN	MIA
First downs	17	16
Rush-yards-TDs	38–179–3	23–122–0
Comp-Att-Yd-TD-INT	9–17–243–2–0	16–31–253–3–1
Sacked-yards	0–0	6–49
Net pass yards	243	204
Total yards	422	326
Fumbles-lost	2–1	3–1
Turnovers	1	2
Penalties-yards	2–31	3–22

=== Week 12 ===
Sunday November 24

Week 12
	1	2	3	4	Final
Oakland Raiders (9–2–0)	7	7	6	14	34
Cincinnati Bengals (3–9–0)	0	0	0	0	0

	OAK	CIN
OAK Charlie H. Smith 7-yard rush (George Blanda kick)	7	0
OAK Hewritt Dixon 5-yard pass from Daryle Lamonica (George Blanda kick)	14	0
OAK George Blanda 43-yard field goal	17	0
OAK George Blanda 27-yard field goal	20	0
OAK Charlie H. Smith 9-yard rush (George Blanda kick)	27	0
OAK Billy Cannon 12-yard pass from George Blanda (George Blanda kick)	34	0

	OAK	CIN
First downs	33	7
Rush-yards-TDs	46–208–2	25–116–0
Comp-Att-Yd-TD-INT	26–34–396–2–0	7–14–44–0–1
Sacked-yards	0–0	2–12
Net pass yards	396	32
Total yards	604	148
Fumbles-lost	2–1	2–2
Turnovers	1	3
Penalties-yards	9–92	5–52

=== Week 13 ===
Sunday December 1

Week 13
	1	2	3	4	Final
Cincinnati Bengals (3–10–0)	0	0	7	7	14
Boston Patriots (4–8–0)	2	24	0	7	33

	CIN	BOS
BOS Safety, Satcher tackled Robinson in end zone	0	2
BOS Gino Cappelletti 27-yard field goal	0	5
BOS Jim Whalen 11-yard pass from Tom Sherman (Gino Cappelletti kick)	0	12
BOS Gino Cappelletti 18-yard pass from Tom Sherman (Gino Cappelletti kick)	0	19
BOS Jim Nance 5-yard rush (Gino Cappelletti kick)	0	26
CIN Estes Banks 5-yard pass from John Stofa (Rod Sherman kick)	7	26
BOS Jim Whalen 21-yard pass from Tom Sherman (Gino Cappelletti kick)	7	33
CIN Rod Sherman 27-yard pass from John Stofa (Rod Sherman kick)	14	33

	CIN	BOS
First downs	14	20
Rush-yards-TDs	30–106–0	37–129–1
Comp-Att-Yd-TD-INT	18–37–126–2–1	12–25–142–3–1
Sacked-yards	2–20	0–0
Net pass yards	106	142
Total yards	212	271
Fumbles-lost	2–0	1–1
Turnovers	1	2
Penalties-yards	3–35	2–19

=== Week 14 ===
Sunday December 8

Week 14
	1	2	3	4	Final
Cincinnati Bengals (3–11–0)	0	7	0	7	14
New York Jets (10–3–0)	14	3	3	7	27

	CIN	NYJ
NYJ George Sauer 10-yard pass from Joe Namath (Jim Turner kick)	0	7
NYJ Don Maynard 12-yard pass from Joe Namath (Jim Turner kick)	0	14
CIN Paul Robinson 14-yard rush (Rod Sherman kick)	7	14
NYJ Jim Turner 35-yard field goal	7	17
NYJ Jim Turner 22-yard field goal	7	20
CIN Jim Griffin 0-yard fumble return (Rod Sherman kick)	14	20
NYJ Bake Turner 34-yard pass from Babe Parilli (Jim Turner kick)	14	27

	CIN	NYJ
First downs	6	19
Rush-yards-TDs	38–107–1	29–85–0
Comp-Att-Yd-TD-INT	3–7–58–0–0	21–39–299–3–1
Sacked-yards	1–7	1–13
Net pass yards	51	286
Total yards	158	371
Fumbles-lost	3–1	1–1
Turnovers	1	2
Penalties-yards	1–5	3–29

== Awards and records ==
=== AFL Rookie of the Year ===
- RB Paul Robinson

=== AFL Pro Bowl Selections ===
- C Bob Johnson
- TE Bob Trumpy

=== Highlights ===
Paul Robinson led the AFL in rushing with 1023 yards and was named Rookie of the Year.
