= 1969 Cincinnati Bengals season =

NFL team season

- Head coach: Paul Brown
- Home stadium: Nippert Stadium

Results
- Record: 4–9–1
- Division place: 5th AFL West
- Playoffs: Did not qualify

The 1969 Cincinnati Bengals season was the team's second year as a franchise, and their final season in professional football's American Football League (AFL).

Head coach Paul Brown drafted quarterback Greg Cook of the University of Cincinnati in the first round. The same draft also produced linebacker Bill Bergey. Cook's season started spectacularly, as he led the Bengals to a 3–0 record. However, due to a pop in his right (throwing) shoulder while being tackled by linebacker Jim Lynch against Kansas City, he missed the next three games. With limited medical technology at the time, his injury went undiagnosed; it was later confirmed as a torn rotator cuff. Despite this, the Bengals defeated the Chiefs 24-19.

The Bengals jumped out to a 3–0 record, but finished 4–9–1 in their final season at Nippert Stadium, before moving to the brand new Riverfront Stadium the following season. Brown would be named AFL Coach of the Year.

The November 9, 1969 Bengals vs. Oilers game at the Astrodome in Houston is unique in Bengals history, as it is the only non-overtime tie game. Cincinnati played its first regular-season tie that afternoon, catching the Oilers at 31–31 on kicker Horst Muhlmann's 18-yard field goal with 0:22 left in the fourth quarter. Regular-season overtime was not in the rule book at that time.

The oldest season record in Bengals history, and the only one still standing from the Nippert Stadium years, is QB Greg Cook's average of 9.41 yards gained per passing attempt in 1969. The only other average of more than nine yards was 9.21 by QB Boomer Esiason in 1988. Cook went on to pass for 1,854 yards and led the Bengals to wins over the Oakland Raiders as well as the eventual Super Bowl Champion Chiefs.

== Offseason ==
=== Common draft ===
1969 Cincinnati Bengals draft
Round	Pick	Player	Position	College	Notes
1	5	Greg Cook	Quarterback	Cincinnati	
2	31	Bill Bergey *	Linebacker	Arkansas State	
3	57	Speedy Thomas	Wide receiver	Utah	
4	83	Clem Turner	Running back	Cincinnati	
5	109	Guy Dennis	Guard	Florida	
6	135	Ken Riley	Defensive back	Florida A&M	
7	161	Royce Berry	Defensive end	Houston	
8	187	Tim Buchanan	Linebacker	Hawaii	
9	213	Mike Stripling	Running back	Tulsa	
10	239	Steve Howell	Tight end	Ohio State	
11	265	Mark Stewart	Defensive back	Georgia	
12	291	Lonnie Paige	Defensive tackle	North Carolina Central	
13	316	Chuck Benson	Wide receiver	Southern Illinois	
14	343	Mike Wilson	Offensive tackle	Dayton	
15	369	Bill Shoemaker	Placekicker	Stanford	
16	395	Bill Schmidt	Linebacker	Missouri	
17	421	Terry Story	Offensive tackle	Georgia Tech	
Made roster * Made at least one Pro Bowl during career

== Personnel ==
=== Staff ===
1969 Cincinnati Bengals staff
Front office: President – John Sawyer; Director of Player Personnel – Pete Brown; Head coaches: Head coach/General Manager – Paul Brown; Offensive coaches: Offensive Backfield – Jack Donaldson; Receivers – Bill Walsh; Offensive Line – Bill Johnson	Defensive coaches: Defensive Coordinator/Defensive Backfield – Tom Bass; Defensive Line – Chuck Studley; Linebackers – Vince Costello

=== Roster ===
1969 Cincinnati Bengals roster
Quarterbacks (QB): 12 Greg Cook; 14 Sam Wyche; Running backs (RB): 19 Essex Johnson; 40 Ron Lamb; 30 Jess Phillips; 18 Paul Robinson; 43 Clem Turner; Wide receivers (WR): 10 Eric Crabtree; 26 Jack Gehrke; 25 Chip Myers; 24 Tommie Smith; 17 Speedy Thomas; Tight ends (TE): 88 Bruce Coslet; 84 Bob Trumpy	Offensive linemen (OL): 64 Justin Canale G; 63 Guy Dennis G; 72 Howard Fest T; 54 Bob Johnson C; 68 Dave Middendorf G; 74 Ernie Park T; 77 Frank Peters T; 67 Michael Wilson G; 75 Ernie Wright T; Defensive linemen (DL): 85 Martin Baccaglio DE; 82 Royce Berry DE; 79 Steve Chomyszak DE/DT; 89 Harry Gunner DE/DT; 70 Andy Rice DT; 83 Bill Staley DT	Linebackers (LB): 51 Ken Avery OLB; 58 Al Beauchamp OLB; 66 Bill Bergey MLB; 52 Tim Buchanan MLB; 53 Bill Peterson OLB; Defensive backs (DB): 23 Al Coleman SS; 27 Ken Dyer FS; 28 John Guillory CB; 20 Bobby Hunt FS; 29 Jim Johnson SS; 47 Charlie King CB; 13 Ken Riley CB; 31 Fletcher Smith CB; Special teams (ST): 11 Dale Livingston P; 16 Horst Mühlmann K; 41 Terry Swanson P	Practice squad: -- Mark Stewart DB; Reserve: 57 Ed Harmon LB (IR); 73 Pat Matson G (IR); -- Wayne McClure LB (Military); Rookies in italics

== Regular season ==
=== Schedule ===
Week	Date	Opponent	Result	Record	Venue	Attendance	Recap
1	September 14	Miami Dolphins	**W** 27–21	1–0	Nippert Stadium	25,335	Recap
2	September 21	**San Diego Chargers**	**W** 34–20	2–0	Nippert Stadium	26,243	Recap
3	September 28	**Kansas City Chiefs**	**W** 24–19	3–0	Nippert Stadium	27,812	Recap
4	October 4	at **San Diego Chargers**	**L** 14–21	3–1	San Diego Stadium	52,748	Recap
5	October 12	New York Jets	**L** 7–21	3–2	Nippert Stadium	27,927	Recap
6	October 19	**Denver Broncos**	**L** 23–30	3–3	Nippert Stadium	27,920	Recap
7	October 26	at **Kansas City Chiefs**	**L** 22–42	3–4	Municipal Stadium	50,934	Recap
8	November 2	**Oakland Raiders**	**W** 31–17	4–4	Nippert Stadium	27,927	Recap
9	November 9	at Houston Oilers	**T** 31–31	4–4–1	Houston Astrodome	45,298	Recap
10	November 16	Boston Patriots	**L** 14–25	4–5–1	Nippert Stadium	25,913	Recap
11	November 23	at New York Jets	**L** 7–40	4–6–1	Shea Stadium	62,128	Recap
12	November 30	at Buffalo Bills	**L** 13–16	4–7–1	War Memorial Stadium	35,122	Recap
13	December 7	at **Oakland Raiders**	**L** 17–37	4–8–1	Oakland–Alameda County Coliseum	54,427	Recap
14	December 14	at **Denver Broncos**	**L** 16–27	4–9–1	Mile High Stadium	42,198	Recap
Note: Intra-division opponents are in **bold** text.

== Standings ==
AFL Western Division
	W	L	T	PCT	DIV	PF	PA	STK
Oakland Raiders	12	1	1	.923	7–1	377	242	W6
Kansas City Chiefs	11	3	0	.786	5–3	359	177	L1
San Diego Chargers	8	6	0	.571	2–6	288	276	W4
Denver Broncos	5	8	1	.385	3–5	297	344	W1
Cincinnati Bengals	4	9	1	.308	3–5	280	367	L5

Note: Tie games were not officially counted in the standings of the AFL.

=== Team stats ===
1969 Cincinnati Bengals Team Stats
TEAM STATS	Bengals	Opponents
TOTAL FIRST DOWNS	172	278
Rushing	66	135
Passing	95	130
Penalty	11	13
TOTAL NET YARDS	3868	5337
Avg Per Game	276.3	381.2
Total Plays	728	935
Avg. Per Play	5.3	5.7
NET YARDS RUSHING	1523	2651
Avg. Per Game	167.5	189.4
Total Rushes	363	523
NET YARDS PASSING	2345	2686
Avg. Per Game	167.5	191.9
Sacked Yards Lost	57–375	16–180
Gross Yards	2720	2866
Att. Completions	308–163	396–205
Completion Pct.	52.9	51.8
Intercepted	15	21
PUNTS-AVERAGE	85–38.8	55–41.4
PENALTIES-YARDS	50–556	72–824
FUMBLES-BALL LOST	30–25	19–16
TOUCHDOWNS	33	42
Rushing	10	13
Passing	22	24
Returns	1	5

Score by Periods	1	2	3	4	Tot
Bengals	48	92	72	68	280
Opponents	78	130	68	91	367

=== Team leaders ===
- Passing: Greg Cook (197 Att, 106 Comp, 1854 Yds, 53.8 Pct, 15 TD, 11 Int, 88.3 Rating)
- Rushing: Jess Phillips (118 Att, 578 Yds, 4.9 Avg, 83 Long, 3 TD)
- Receiving: Eric Crabtree (40 Rec, 855 Yds, 21.4 Avg, 73 Long, 7 TD)
- Scoring: Horst Muhlmann, 80 points (16 FG; 32 PAT)

== Awards and records ==
=== AFL Coach of the Year ===
- Paul Brown

=== AFL Passing Title ===
- Greg Cook

=== AFL Defensive Rookie of the Year ===
- Bill Bergey

=== AFL Pro Bowl Selections ===
- RB Paul Robinson
- TE Bob Trumpy
