= 1969 Denver Broncos season =

American football team season

- Owner: Gerald Phipps
- General manager: Lou Saban
- Head coach: Lou Saban
- Home stadium: Mile High Stadium

Results
- Record: 5–8–1
- Division place: 4th AFL West
- Playoffs: Did not qualify

The 1969 Denver Broncos season was the team's tenth season as a franchise, and their final season in the American Football League (AFL) before the league merged with the National Football League (NFL). Led by third-year head coach and general manager Lou Saban, the Broncos were 5–8–1, fourth place in the AFL West for the seventh straight season.

Denver opened with two victories at home, but were winless in their previous five games entering the season finale; they avoided the division cellar with a home win over Cincinnati in the final AFL game for both.

Of the original eight franchises, Denver was the only one to never play in the AFL postseason and the only one to never post a winning record. Six of the teams won league titles; the other exception was Boston, who won their sole division title via a tiebreaker game in 1963. The Broncos posted their first winning record in 1973 and made their first postseason in 1977, advancing to Super Bowl XII.

== Offseason ==
=== NFL draft ===
1969 Denver Broncos draft
Round	Pick	Player	Position	College	Notes
2	36	Grady Cavness	DB	UTEP	
3	61	Bill Thompson *	DB	Maryland State	
4	84	Mike Schnitker	LB	Colorado	
4	88	Edward Hayes	DB	Morgan State	
5	113	Frank Quayle	RB	Virginia	
6	131	Wandy Williams	RB	Hofstra	
6	140	Mike Coleman	RB	Tampa	
7	165	Al Giffin	TE	Auburn	
9	217	Henry Jones	RB	Grambling State	
10	244	Jim Smith	DB	Utah State	
11	270	Alan Pastrana	QB	Maryland	
12	296	Wes Plummer	DB	Arizona State	
13	321	John Sias	LB	Georgia Tech	
14	348	Garry Crane	LB	Arkansas State	
15	373	Errol Kahoun	G	Miami (OH)	
16	400	Billy Woods	DB	North Texas State	
17	425	Buster O'Brien	QB	Richmond	
Made roster † Pro Football Hall of Fame * Made at least one Pro Bowl during career

=== Undrafted free agents ===
1969 Undrafted Free Agents of note
Player	Position	College
George Burrell	Defensive back	Penn
Ken Criter	Linebacker	Wisconsin
Bill Rucinski	Linebacker	Adams State

== Personnel ==
=== Staff / Coaches ===
1969 Denver Broncos staff
Front office: Team Owner / Chairman of the Board – Gerald Phipps; Team President – Allan R Phipps; Director of Player Personnel – Fred Gehrke; Head coaches: General Manager/Head Coach – Lou Saban; Offensive coaches: Offensive Backfield – Hunter Enis; Offensive Receivers – Sam Rutigliano; Offensive Line – Whitey Dovell	Defensive coaches: Defensive Line – Stan Jones; Defensive Linebackers – Dick MacPherson; Defensive Backfield – Joe Collier

=== Roster ===
1969 Denver Broncos roster
Quarterbacks (QB): 14 Pete Liske; 12 Alan Pastrana; 13 Steve Tensi; Running backs (RB): 25 Ted Alflen; 35 Henry Jones; 44 Floyd Little; 22 Fran Lynch; 26 Frank Quayle; 39 Tom Smiley; 29 Wandy Williams; Wide receivers (WR): 89 John Embree; 88 Al Denson; 84 Mike Haffner; 42 Billy Van Heusen P; Tight ends (TE): 85 Tom Beer; 80 Tom Buckman; 82 Dave Pivec	Offensive linemen (OL): 56 Jay Bachman C/G; 72 Sam Brunelli T; 74 Mike Current T; 71 Wallace Dickey T; 67 George Goeddeke G; 65 Wally Highsmith G/C; 59 Larry Kaminski C; 64 Mike Schnitker G; 60 Bob Young G; Defensive linemen (DL): 73 Walt Barnes DT; 63 Dave Costa DT; 55 Pete Duranko DE; 62 Jerry Inman DT; 87 Rich Jackson DE; 75 Rex Mirich DT; 70 Paul Smith DT/DE	Linebackers (LB): 76 Gary Crane OLB; 78 Ken Criter MLB; 50 Carl Cunningham OLB; 57 John Huard MLB; 54 Chip Myrtle OLB; 58 Frank Richter OLB; Defensive backs (DB): 41 George Burrell FS; 40 Grady Cavness CB; 20 Charlie Greer SS; 34 Gus Hollomon SS/P; 43 Pete Jaquess CB/S; 47 Jimmy Smith FS; 36 Bill Thompson CB; Special teams (ST): 3 Bobby Howfield K	Practice squad: -- Dick Davis; Reserve: 52 Fred Forsberg LB (IR); 64 George Gaiser G (IR); -- Paul Latzke C (IR); 27 Tom Oberg S (IR); Rookies in italics

== Regular season ==
=== Schedule ===
Week	Date	Opponent	Result	Record	Venue	Attendance	Recap
1	September 14	Boston Patriots	**W** 35–7	1–0	Mile High Stadium	43,482	Recap
2	September 21	New York Jets	**W** 21–19	2–0	Mile High Stadium	50,583	Recap
3	September 28	at Buffalo Bills	**L** 28–41	2–1	War Memorial Stadium	40,302	Recap
4	October 5	**Kansas City Chiefs**	**L** 13–26	2–2	Mile High Stadium	50,564	Recap
5	October 12	**Oakland Raiders**	**L** 14–24	2–3	Mile High Stadium	49,511	Recap
6	October 19	at **Cincinnati Bengals**	**W** 30–23	3–3	Nippert Stadium	27,920	Recap
7	October 26	at Houston Oilers	**L** 21–24	3–4	Astrodome	45,348	Recap
8	November 2	**San Diego Chargers**	**W** 13–0	4–4	Mile High Stadium	45,511	Recap
9	November 9	at **Oakland Raiders**	**L** 10–41	4–5	Oakland–Alameda County Coliseum	54,416	Recap
10	November 16	Houston Oilers	**T** 20–20	4–5–1	Mile High Stadium	45,002	Recap
11	November 23	at **San Diego Chargers**	**L** 24–45	4–6–1	San Diego Stadium	34,664	Recap
12	November 27	at **Kansas City Chiefs**	**L** 17–31	4–7–1	Municipal Stadium	48,773	Recap
13	December 7	at Miami Dolphins	**L** 24–27	4–8–1	Miami Orange Bowl	25,332	Recap
14	December 14	**Cincinnati Bengals**	**W** 27–16	5–8–1	Mile High Stadium	42,198	Recap
Note: Intra-division opponents are in **bold** text.

=== Standings ===
AFL Western Division
	W	L	T	PCT	DIV	PF	PA	STK
Oakland Raiders	12	1	1	.923	7–1	377	242	W6
Kansas City Chiefs	11	3	0	.786	5–3	359	177	L1
San Diego Chargers	8	6	0	.571	2–6	288	276	W4
Denver Broncos	5	8	1	.385	3–5	297	344	W1
Cincinnati Bengals	4	9	1	.308	3–5	280	367	L5

Note: Tie games were not officially counted in the standings of the AFL.
