= List of NFL Rookie of the Year awards =

American professional football award

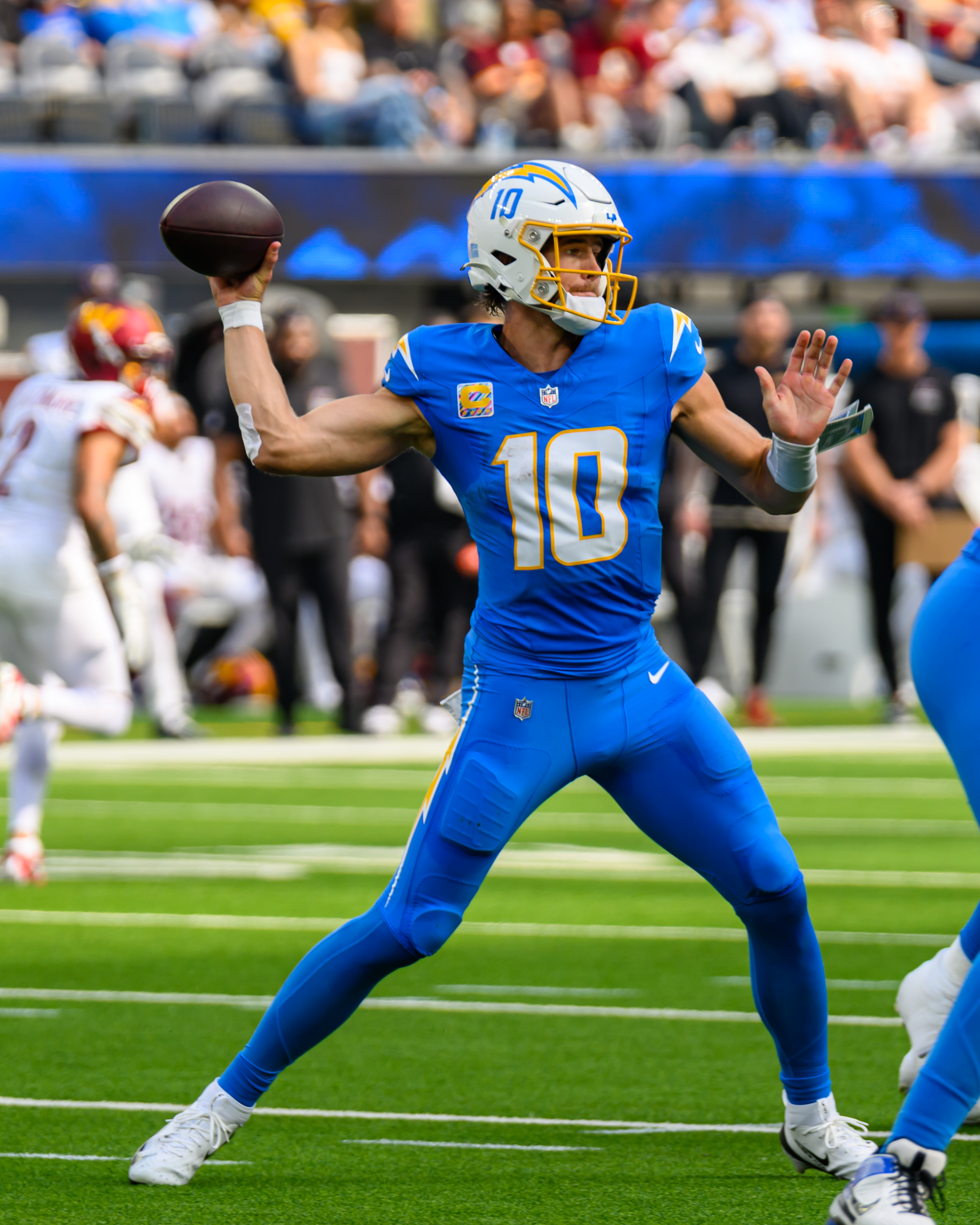
Justin Herbert (2020 Offensive Rookie of the Year) in his Chargers jersey

Various entities present an NFL Rookie of the Year award each season to the top rookies in the National Football League (NFL). The NFL considers the rookie of the year awards by the Associated Press (AP) to be its official honor. Since 2011, the AP awards have been presented at the NFL Honors.

== Associated Press (AP) ==
=== Winners (1967–present) ===
Season	Offensive			Defensive			Ref.
Season	Player	Team	Position	Player	Team	Position	Ref.
1967	Mel Farr	Detroit	RB	Lem Barney	Detroit	CB	
1968	Earl McCullouch	Detroit	WR	Claude Humphrey	Atlanta	DE	
1969	Calvin Hill	Dallas	RB	Joe Greene	Pittsburgh	DT	
1970	Dennis Shaw	Buffalo	QB	Bruce Taylor	San Francisco	CB	
1971	John Brockington	Green Bay	RB	Isiah Robertson	LA Rams	LB	
1972	Franco Harris	Pittsburgh	RB	Willie Buchanon	Green Bay	CB	
1973	Chuck Foreman	Minnesota	RB	Wally Chambers	Chicago	DT	
1974	Don Woods	San Diego	RB	Jack Lambert	Pittsburgh	LB	
1975	Mike Thomas	Washington	RB	Robert Brazile	Houston	LB	
1976	Sammy White	Minnesota	WR	Mike Haynes	New England	CB	
1977	Tony Dorsett	Dallas	RB	A. J. Duhe	Miami	DE	
1978	Earl Campbell	Houston	RB	Al Baker	Detroit	DE	
1979	Ottis Anderson	St. Louis	RB	Jim Haslett	Buffalo	LB	
1980	Billy Sims	Detroit	RB	Buddy Curry	Atlanta	LB	
1980	Billy Sims	Detroit	RB	Al Richardson	Atlanta	LB	
1981	George Rogers	New Orleans	RB	Lawrence Taylor	NY Giants	LB	
1982	Marcus Allen	LA Raiders	RB	Chip Banks	Cleveland	LB	
1983	Eric Dickerson	LA Rams	RB	Vernon Maxwell	Baltimore	LB	
1984	Louis Lipps	Pittsburgh	WR	Bill Maas	Kansas City	DT	
1985	Eddie Brown	Cincinnati	WR	Duane Bickett	Indianapolis	LB	
1986	Rueben Mayes	New Orleans	RB	Leslie O'Neal	San Diego	DE	
1987	Troy Stradford	Miami	RB	Shane Conlan	Buffalo	LB	
1988	John Stephens	New England	RB	Erik McMillan	NY Jets	S	
1989	Barry Sanders	Detroit	RB	Derrick Thomas	Kansas City	LB	
1990	Emmitt Smith	Dallas	RB	Mark Carrier	Chicago	S	
1991	Leonard Russell	New England	RB	Mike Croel	Denver	LB	
1992	Carl Pickens	Cincinnati	WR	Dale Carter	Kansas City	CB	
1993	Jerome Bettis	LA Rams	RB	Dana Stubblefield	San Francisco	DT	
1994	Marshall Faulk	Indianapolis	RB	Tim Bowens	Miami	DT	
1995	Curtis Martin	New England	RB	Hugh Douglas	NY Jets	DE	
1996	Eddie George	Houston	RB	Simeon Rice	Arizona	DE	
1997	Warrick Dunn	Tampa Bay	RB	Peter Boulware	Baltimore	LB	
1998	Randy Moss	Minnesota	WR	Charles Woodson	Oakland	CB	
1999	Edgerrin James	Indianapolis	RB	Jevon Kearse	Tennessee	DE	
2000	Mike Anderson	Denver	RB	Brian Urlacher	Chicago	LB	
2001	Anthony Thomas	Chicago	RB	Kendrell Bell	Pittsburgh	LB	
2002	Clinton Portis	Denver	RB	Julius Peppers	Carolina	DE	
2003	Anquan Boldin	Arizona	WR	Terrell Suggs	Baltimore	LB	
2004	Ben Roethlisberger	Pittsburgh	QB	Jonathan Vilma	NY Jets	LB	
2005	Cadillac Williams	Tampa Bay	RB	Shawne Merriman	San Diego	LB	
2006	Vince Young	Tennessee	QB	DeMeco Ryans	Houston	LB	
2007	Adrian Peterson	Minnesota	RB	Patrick Willis	San Francisco	LB	
2008	Matt Ryan	Atlanta	QB	Jerod Mayo	New England	LB	
2009	Percy Harvin	Minnesota	WR	Brian Cushing	Houston	LB	
2010	Sam Bradford	St. Louis	QB	Ndamukong Suh	Detroit	DT	
2011	Cam Newton	Carolina	QB	Von Miller	Denver	LB	
2012	Robert Griffin III	Washington	QB	Luke Kuechly	Carolina	LB	
2013	Eddie Lacy	Green Bay	RB	Sheldon Richardson	NY Jets	DE	
2014	Odell Beckham Jr.	NY Giants	WR	Aaron Donald	St. Louis	DT	
2015	Todd Gurley	St. Louis	RB	Marcus Peters	Kansas City	CB	
2016	Dak Prescott	Dallas	QB	Joey Bosa	San Diego	DE	
2017	Alvin Kamara	New Orleans	RB	Marshon Lattimore	New Orleans	CB	
2018	Saquon Barkley	NY Giants	RB	Shaquille Leonard	Indianapolis	LB	
2019	Kyler Murray	Arizona	QB	Nick Bosa	San Francisco	DE	
2020	Justin Herbert	LA Chargers	QB	Chase Young	Washington	DE	
2021	Ja'Marr Chase	Cincinnati	WR	Micah Parsons	Dallas	LB	
2022	Garrett Wilson	NY Jets	WR	Sauce Gardner	NY Jets	CB	
2023	C. J. Stroud	Houston	QB	Will Anderson Jr.	Houston	DE	
2024	Jayden Daniels	Washington	QB	Jared Verse	LA Rams	LB	
2025	Tetairoa McMillan	Carolina	WR	Carson Schwesinger	Cleveland	LB	

== Pro Football Writers of America (PFWA) ==
The Pro Football Writers of America (PFWA) Rookie of the Year awards have been given annually to an offensive and defensive rookie in the NFL since 1969, except in 1985. In 2013, PFWA began selecting an overall NFL rookie of the year in addition to its offensive and defensive honors. The winners are chosen by Pro Football Weekly writers/editors and PFWA members.

=== Winners (2013–present) ===
Season	Player	Team	Position
2013	Eddie Lacy	Green Bay	RB
2014	Odell Beckham Jr.	NY Giants	WR
2015	Todd Gurley	St. Louis	RB
2016	Ezekiel Elliott	Dallas	RB
2017	Kareem Hunt	Kansas City	RB
2018	Baker Mayfield	Cleveland	QB
2019	Nick Bosa	San Francisco	DE
2020	Justin Herbert	LA Chargers	QB
2021	Micah Parsons	Dallas	LB
2022	Sauce Gardner	NY Jets	CB
2023	C. J. Stroud	Houston	QB
2024	Jayden Daniels	Washington	QB
2025	Tetairoa McMillan	Carolina	WR

=== Offensive and defensive (1969–present) ===
Season	Offensive			Defensive		
Season	Player	Team	Position	Player	Team	Position
1969	Calvin Hill (NFL)	Dallas	RB	Joe Greene (NFL)	Pittsburgh	DT
1969	Greg Cook (AFL)	Cincinnati	QB	Jim Marsalis (AFL)	Kansas City	CB
1970	Dennis Shaw	Buffalo	QB	Bruce Taylor	San Francisco	CB
1971	Jim Plunkett	New England	QB	Isiah Robertson	LA Rams	LB
1972	Franco Harris	Pittsburgh	RB	Sherman White	Cincinnati	DE
1973	Charle Young	Philadelphia	TE	Wally Chambers	Chicago	DT
1974	Don Woods	San Diego	RB	Jack Lambert	Pittsburgh	LB
1974	Mike Thomas	Washington	RB	Jack Lambert	Pittsburgh	LB
1975	Steve Bartkowski	Atlanta	QB	Robert Brazile	Houston	LB
1976	Sammy White	Minnesota	WR	Mike Haynes	New England	CB
1977	Tony Dorsett	Dallas	RB	A. J. Duhe	Miami	DE
1978	Earl Campbell	Houston	RB	Al Baker	Detroit	DE
1979	Ottis Anderson	St. Louis	RB	Jesse Baker	Houston	DE
1980	Billy Sims	Detroit	RB	Buddy Curry	Atlanta	LB
1981	George Rogers	New Orleans	RB	Lawrence Taylor	NY Giants	LB
1982	Marcus Allen	LA Raiders	RB	Chip Banks	Cleveland	LB
1983	Eric Dickerson	LA Rams	RB	Vernon Maxwell	Baltimore	LB
1984	Louis Lipps	Pittsburgh	WR	Tom Flynn	Green Bay	S
1986	Rueben Mayes	New Orleans	RB	Leslie O'Neal	San Diego	DE
1986	Rueben Mayes	New Orleans	RB	John Offerdahl	Miami	LB
1987	Troy Stradford	Miami	RB	Shane Conlan	Buffalo	LB
1988	John Stephens	New England	RB	Erik McMillan	NY Jets	S
1988	Ickey Woods	Cincinnati	RB	Erik McMillan	NY Jets	S
1989	Barry Sanders	Detroit	RB	Derrick Thomas	Kansas City	LB
1990	Emmitt Smith	Dallas	RB	Mark Carrier	Chicago	S
1991	Leonard Russell	New England	RB	Mike Croel	Denver	LB
1992	Jason Hanson	Detroit	PK	Dale Carter	Kansas City	CB
1993	Jerome Bettis	LA Rams	RB	Dana Stubblefield	San Francisco	DT
1994	Marshall Faulk	Indianapolis	RB	Tim Bowens	Miami	DT
1995	Curtis Martin	New England	RB	Hugh Douglas	NY Jets	DE
1996	Eddie George	Houston	RB	Simeon Rice	Arizona	DE
1997	Warrick Dunn	Tampa Bay	RB	Peter Boulware	Baltimore	LB
1998	Randy Moss	Minnesota	WR	Charles Woodson	Oakland	CB
1999	Edgerrin James	Indianapolis	RB	Jevon Kearse	Tennessee	DE
2000	Mike Anderson	Denver	RB	Brian Urlacher	Chicago	LB
2001	Anthony Thomas	Chicago	RB	Kendrell Bell	Pittsburgh	LB
2002	Clinton Portis	Denver	RB	Julius Peppers	Carolina	DE
2003	Anquan Boldin	Arizona	WR	Terrell Suggs	Baltimore	LB
2004	Ben Roethlisberger	Pittsburgh	QB	Dunta Robinson	Houston	CB
2005	Cadillac Williams	Tampa Bay	RB	Shawne Merriman	San Diego	LB
2006	Vince Young	Tennessee	QB	DeMeco Ryans	Houston	LB
2007	Adrian Peterson	Minnesota	RB	Patrick Willis	San Francisco	LB
2008	Matt Ryan	Atlanta	QB	Jerod Mayo	New England	LB
2009	Percy Harvin	Minnesota	WR	Brian Cushing	Houston	LB
2010	Sam Bradford	St. Louis	QB	Ndamukong Suh	Detroit	DT
2011	Cam Newton	Carolina	QB	Aldon Smith	San Francisco	OLB
2012	Robert Griffin III	Washington	QB	Luke Kuechly	Carolina	LB
2013	Keenan Allen	San Diego	WR	Kiko Alonso	Buffalo	LB
2014	Odell Beckham Jr.	NY Giants	WR	Aaron Donald	St. Louis	DT
2015	Todd Gurley	St. Louis	RB	Marcus Peters	Kansas City	CB
2016	Ezekiel Elliott	Dallas	RB	Joey Bosa	San Diego	DE
2017	Kareem Hunt	Kansas City	RB	Marshon Lattimore	New Orleans	CB
2017	Alvin Kamara	New Orleans	RB	Marshon Lattimore	New Orleans	CB
2018	Saquon Barkley	NY Giants	RB	Shaquille Leonard	Indianapolis	LB
2019	Kyler Murray	Arizona	QB	Nick Bosa	San Francisco	DE
2020	Justin Herbert	LA Chargers	QB	Chase Young	Washington	DE
2021	Ja'Marr Chase	Cincinnati	WR	Micah Parsons	Dallas	LB
2022	Garrett Wilson	NY Jets	WR	Sauce Gardner	NY Jets	CB
2023	C. J. Stroud	Houston	QB	Will Anderson Jr.	Houston	DE
2024	Jayden Daniels	Washington	QB	Jared Verse	LA Rams	OLB
2025	Tetairoa McMillan	Carolina	WR	Carson Schwesinger	Cleveland	LB

== The Sporting News ==
The Sporting News NFL Rookie of the Year award is chosen annually by NFL players, coaches, and executives. Separate winners were named for the NFL and AFL between 1960 and 1969. After the merger, separate winners continued to be named for both the NFC and AFC through 1979. Since 1980, one winner has been chosen across the entire league.

=== NFL winners (1955–1969) ===
Season	Player	Team	Position
1955	Alan Ameche	Baltimore	FB
1956	J. C. Caroline	Chicago	DB
1957	Jim Brown	Cleveland	FB
1958	Bobby Mitchell	Cleveland	HB
1959	Nick Pietrosante	Detroit	FB
1960	Gail Cogdill	Detroit	WR
1961	Mike Ditka	Chicago	TE
1962	Ronnie Bull	Chicago	HB
1963	Paul Flatley	Minnesota	WR
1964	Charley Taylor	Washington	WR
1965	Gale Sayers	Chicago	HB
1966	Tommy Nobis	Atlanta	LB
1967	Mel Farr	Detroit	HB
1968	Earl McCullouch	Detroit	WR
1969	Calvin Hill	Dallas	HB

=== AFL winners (1960–1969) ===
Season	Player	Team	Position
1960	Abner Haynes	Dallas Texans	HB
1961	Earl Faison	San Diego	DE
1962	Curtis McClinton	Dallas Texans	FB
1963	Billy Joe	Denver	FB
1964	Matt Snell	NY Jets	FB
1965	Joe Namath	NY Jets	QB
1966	Bobby Burnett	Buffalo	HB
1967	Dickie Post	San Diego	HB
1968	Paul Robinson	Cincinnati	RB
1969	Greg Cook	Cincinnati	QB

=== NFC winners (1970–1979) ===
Season	Player	Team	Position
1970	Bruce Taylor	San Francisco	CB
1971	John Brockington	Green Bay	FB
1972	Chester Marcol	Green Bay	PK
1973	Chuck Foreman	Minnesota	RB
1974	Wilbur Jackson	San Francisco	RB
1975	Steve Bartkowski	Atlanta	QB
1976	Sammy White	Minnesota	WR
1977	Tony Dorsett	Dallas	RB
1978	Al Baker	Detroit	DE
1979	Ottis Anderson	St. Louis	RB

=== AFC winners (1970–1979) ===
Season	Player	Team	Position
1970	Dennis Shaw	Buffalo	QB
1971	Jim Plunkett	New England	QB
1972	Franco Harris	Pittsburgh	FB
1973	Boobie Clark	Cincinnati	FB
1974	Don Woods	San Diego	HB
1975	Robert Brazile	Houston	LB
1976	Mike Haynes	New England	CB
1977	A.J. Duhe	Miami	DE
1978	Earl Campbell	Houston	RB
1979	Jerry Butler	Buffalo	WR

=== Winners (1980–present) ===
Season	Player	Team	Position
1980	Billy Sims	Detroit	RB
1981	George Rogers	New Orleans	RB
1982	Marcus Allen	LA Raiders	RB
1983	Dan Marino	Miami	QB
1984	Louis Lipps	Pittsburgh	WR
1985	Eddie Brown	Cincinnati	WR
1986	Reuben Mayes	New Orleans	RB
1987	Robert Awalt	St. Louis	TE
1988	Keith Jackson	Philadelphia	TE
1989	Barry Sanders	Detroit	RB
1990	Richmond Webb	Miami	OT
1991	Mike Croel	Denver	LB
1992	Santana Dotson	Tampa Bay	DT
1993	Jerome Bettis	LA Rams	RB
1994	Marshall Faulk	Indianapolis	RB
1995	Curtis Martin	New England	RB
1996	Eddie George	Houston	RB
1997	Warrick Dunn	Tampa Bay	RB
1998	Randy Moss	Minnesota	WR
1999	Edgerrin James	Indianapolis	RB
2000	Brian Urlacher	Chicago	LB
2001	Kendrell Bell	Pittsburgh	LB
2002	Clinton Portis	Denver	RB
2003	Anquan Boldin	Arizona	WR
2004	Ben Roethlisberger	Pittsburgh	QB
2005	Shawne Merriman	San Diego	LB
2006	Vince Young	Tennessee	QB
2007	Adrian Peterson	Minnesota	RB
2008	Matt Ryan	Atlanta	QB
2009	Percy Harvin	Minnesota	WR
2010	Ndamukong Suh	Detroit	DT
2011	Cam Newton	Carolina	QB
2012	Robert Griffin III	Washington	QB
2013	Eddie Lacy	Green Bay	RB
2014	Odell Beckham Jr.	NY Giants	WR
2015	Todd Gurley	St. Louis	RB
2016	Ezekiel Elliott	Dallas	RB
2017	Alvin Kamara	New Orleans	RB
2018	Saquon Barkley	NY Giants	RB
2019	Nick Bosa	San Francisco	DE
2020	Justin Jefferson	Minnesota	WR
2021	Ja'Marr Chase	Cincinnati	WR
2022	Sauce Gardner	NY Jets	CB
2023	Puka Nacua	LA Rams	WR
2024	Jayden Daniels	Washington	QB
2025	Emeka Egbuka	Tampa Bay	WR

== Pepsi ==
Pepsi NFL Rookie of the Year, sponsored by Pepsi since 2002, is a fan-voted award given to the best performing rookie player in the National Football League. Winners are chosen among five finalists tallied from total votes given to Pepsi NFL Rookie of the Week winners by votes on NFL.com. The award is sometimes named after Diet Pepsi and Pepsi Zero Sugar.

=== Winners (2002–present) ===
Season	Player	Team	Position	Ref.
2002	Jeremy Shockey	NY Giants	TE	
2003	Domanick Davis	Houston	RB	
2004	Ben Roethlisberger	Pittsburgh	QB	
2005	Cadillac Williams	Tampa Bay	RB	
2006	Vince Young	Tennessee	QB	
2007	Adrian Peterson	Minnesota	RB	
2008	Joe Flacco	Baltimore	QB	
2009	Percy Harvin	Minnesota	WR	
2010	Ndamukong Suh	Detroit	DT	
2011	Cam Newton	Carolina	QB	
2012	Russell Wilson	Seattle	QB	
2013	Keenan Allen	San Diego	WR	
2014	Teddy Bridgewater	Minnesota	QB	
2015	Jameis Winston	Tampa Bay	QB	
2016	Dak Prescott	Dallas	QB	
2017	Alvin Kamara	New Orleans	RB	
2018	Saquon Barkley	NY Giants	RB	
2019	Nick Bosa	San Francisco	DE	
2020	Justin Herbert	LA Chargers	QB	
2021	Ja'Marr Chase	Cincinnati	WR	
2022	Aidan Hutchinson	Detroit	DE	
2023	C. J. Stroud	Houston	QB	
2024	Jayden Daniels	Washington	QB	
2025	Tyler Shough	New Orleans	QB	

== Defunct awards ==
=== United Press International ===
United Press International (UPI) awarded an annual NFL Rookie of the Year award from 1955 to 1959 and two annual awards from 1960 to 1996. From 1960 to 1969 the awards went to a rookie from the NFL and American Football League (AFL), and after the AFL–NFL merger in 1970, the awards went to a rookie from the National Football Conference (NFC) and American Football Conference (AFC).

==== NFL winners (1955–1969) ====
Season	Player	Team	Position	Ref.
1955	Alan Ameche	Baltimore	FB	
1956	Lenny Moore	Baltimore	HB	
1957	Jim Brown	Cleveland	FB	
1958	Jimmy Orr	Pittsburgh	E	
1959	Boyd Dowler	Green Bay	E	
1960	Gail Cogdill	Detroit	E	
1961	Mike Ditka	Chicago	TE	
1962	Ronnie Bull	Chicago	FB	
1963	Paul Flatley	Minnesota	WR	
1964	Charley Taylor	Washington	WR	
1965	Gale Sayers	Chicago	RB	
1966	Johnny Roland	St. Louis	HB	
1967	Mel Farr	Detroit	RB	
1968	Earl McCullough	Detroit	WR	
1969	Calvin Hill	Dallas	RB	

==== AFL winners (1960–1969) ====
Season	Player	Team	Position
1960	Abner Haynes	Dallas	HB
1961	Earl Faison	San Diego	DE
1962	Curtis McClinton	Dallas	FB
1963	Billy Joe	Denver	FB
1964	Matt Snell	NY Jets	FB
1965	Joe Namath	NY Jets	QB
1966	Bobby Burnett	Buffalo	HB
1967	George Webster	Houston	LB
1968	Paul Robinson	Cincinnati	RB
1969	Greg Cook	Cincinnati	QB

==== NFC winners (1970–1996) ====
Season	Player	Team	Position
1970	Bruce Taylor	San Francisco	DB
1971	John Brockington	Green Bay	RB
1972	Chester Marcol	Green Bay	PK
1973	Charle Young	Philadelphia	TE
1974	John Hicks	NY Giants	G
1975	Mike Thomas	Washington	RB
1976	Sammy White	Minnesota	WR
1977	Tony Dorsett	Dallas	RB
1978	Al Baker	Detroit	DE
1979	Ottis Anderson	St. Louis	RB
1980	Billy Sims	Detroit	RB
1981	George Rogers	New Orleans	RB
1982	Jim McMahon	Chicago	QB
1983	Eric Dickerson	LA Rams	RB
1984	Paul McFadden	Philadelphia	PK
1985	Jerry Rice	San Francisco	WR
1986	Rueben Mayes	New Orleans	RB
1987	Robert Awalt	St. Louis	TE
1988	Keith Jackson	Philadelphia	TE
1989	Barry Sanders	Detroit	RB
1990	Mark Carrier	Chicago	S
1991	Lawrence Dawsey	Tampa Bay	WR
1992	Robert Jones	Dallas	LB
1993	Jerome Bettis	LA Rams	RB
1994	Bryant Young	San Francisco	DT
1995	Rashaan Salaam	Chicago	RB
1996	Simeon Rice	Arizona	DE

==== AFC winners (1970–1996) ====
Season	Player	Team	Position
1970	Dennis Shaw	Buffalo	QB
1971	Jim Plunkett	New England	QB
1972	Franco Harris	Pittsburgh	RB
1973	Boobie Clark	Cincinnati	RB
1974	Don Woods	San Diego	RB
1975	Robert Brazile	Houston	LB
1976	Mike Haynes	New England	DB
1977	A. J. Duhe	Miami	DE
1978	Earl Campbell	Houston	RB
1979	Jerry Butler	Buffalo	WR
1980	Joe Cribbs	Buffalo	RB
1981	Joe Delaney	Kansas City	RB
1982	Marcus Allen	LA Raiders	RB
1983	Curt Warner	Seattle	RB
1984	Louis Lipps	Pittsburgh	WR
1985	Kevin Mack	Cleveland	RB
1986	Leslie O'Neal	San Diego	DE
1987	Shane Conlan	Buffalo	LB
1988	John Stephens	New England	RB
1989	Derrick Thomas	Kansas City	LB
1990	Richmond Webb	Miami	OT
1991	Mike Croel	Denver	LB
1992	Dale Carter	Kansas City	CB
1993	Rick Mirer	Seattle	QB
1994	Marshall Faulk	Indianapolis	RB
1995	Curtis Martin	New England	RB
1996	Terry Glenn	New England	WR

=== Newspaper Enterprise Association ===
The NEA NFL Rookie of the Year award was founded in 1964 by the Newspaper Enterprise Association. and was created by Murray Olderman, the senior sports editor for the NEA. From 1971 through 1976 winners for both the American Football Conference and National Football Conference were chosen, except in 1974. The award was discontinued after the 1998 season. Winners were awarded the Bert Bell Memorial Trophy, in honor of former NFL commissioner Bert Bell.

Season	Player	Team	Position
1964	Charley Taylor	Washington	WR
1965	Gale Sayers	Chicago	RB
1966	Tommy Nobis	Atlanta	LB
1967	Mel Farr	Detroit	RB
1968	Earl McCullouch	Detroit	WR
1969	Calvin Hill	Dallas	RB
1970	Raymond Chester	Oakland	TE
1971	Jim Plunkett (AFC)	New England	QB
1971	John Brockington (NFC)	Green Bay	RB
1972	Franco Harris (AFC)	Pittsburgh	RB
1972	Willie Buchanon (NFC)	Green Bay	CB
1973	Boobie Clark (AFC)	Cincinnati	RB
1973	Charle Young (NFC)	Philadelphia	TE
1974	Don Woods	San Diego	RB
1975	Robert Brazile (AFC)	Houston	LB
1975	Steve Bartkowski (NFC)	Atlanta	QB
1976	Mike Haynes (AFC)	New England	CB
1976	Sammy White (NFC)	Minnesota	WR
1977	Tony Dorsett	Dallas	RB
1978	Earl Campbell	Houston	RB
1979	Ottis Anderson	St. Louis	RB
1980	Billy Sims	Detroit	RB
1981	Lawrence Taylor	NY Giants	OLB
1982	Marcus Allen	LA Raiders	RB
1983	Eric Dickerson	LA Rams	RB
1984	Louis Lipps	Pittsburgh	WR
1985	Eddie Brown	Cincinnati	WR
1986	Rueben Mayes	New Orleans	RB
1987	Bo Jackson	LA Raiders	RB
1988	John Stephens	New England	RB
1989	Barry Sanders	Detroit	RB
1990	Eric Green	Pittsburgh	TE
1991	Mike Croel	Denver	OLB
1992	Dale Carter	Kansas City	CB
1993	Jerome Bettis	LA Rams	RB
1994	Marshall Faulk	Indianapolis	RB
1995	Joey Galloway	Seattle	WR
1996	Eddie George	Houston	RB
1997	Warrick Dunn	Tampa Bay	RB
1998	Randy Moss	Minnesota	WR

== See also ==
- List of NFL awards
