= List of Alabama A&M Bulldogs in the NFL draft =

This is a list of Alabama A&M Bulldogs football players in the NFL draft.

== Key ==
B	Back	K	Kicker	NT	Nose tackle
C	Center	LB	Linebacker	FB	Fullback
DB	Defensive back	P	Punter	HB	Halfback
DE	Defensive end	QB	Quarterback	WR	Wide receiver
DT	Defensive tackle	RB	Running back	G	Guard
E	End	T	Offensive tackle	TE	Tight end

== Selections ==
Year	Round	Pick	Player	Team	Position
1967	11	288	Bernard Corbin	New Orleans Saints	DB
1968	6	143	Billy Kendricks	Cincinnati Bengals	T
1969	5	110	Onree Jackson	Boston Patriots	QB
1969	15	387	Alvin Presell	Oakland Raiders	RB
1971	13	313	Lewis Swain	New England Patriots	DB
1973	16	398	Oliver Ross	Denver Broncos	RB
1974	4	82	John Stallworth	Pittsburgh Steelers	WR
1978	8	221	Frank Smith	Denver Broncos	T
1982	5	133	Michael Williams	Washington Redskins	TE
1982	12	312	Raymond Coley	Los Angeles Rams	DT
1983	6	150	Reginald Gipson	Seattle Seahawks	RB
1985	9	239	Morris Johnson	Green Bay Packers	G
1987	11	283	Howard Ballard	Buffalo Bills	T
1991	8	219	Todd Woulard	Los Angeles Raiders	LB
1994	3	97	Joe Patton	Washington Redskins	G
1994	6	173	Fred Lester	New York Jets	RB
2003	5	138	Robert Mathis	Indianapolis Colts	DE
2007	5	158	Johnny Baldwin	Detroit Lions	LB
2011	7	231	Frank Kearse	Miami Dolphins	DT
2025	5	141	Carson Vinson	Baltimore Ravens	T
