= Wandy =

Wandy is a given name. Notable people with the name include:

- Wandy Peralta (born 1991), Dominican professional baseball pitcher
- Wandy Rodríguez (born 1979), Dominican professional baseball pitcher
- Wandy Williams (born 1946), American football player
