= Eric Crabtree =

American football player (born 1944)

No. 31, 41, 10
- Positions: Wide receiver, Defensive back

Personal information
- Born: November 3, 1944 (age 82); Monessen, Pennsylvania, U.S.
- Listed height: 6 ft 0 in (1.83 m)
- Listed weight: 185 lb (84 kg)

Career information
- High school: Monessen
- College: Pittsburgh
- NFL draft: 1966: 11th round, 170th overall pick
- AFL draft: 1966: 13th round, 112th overall pick

Career history
- Denver Broncos (1966–1968); Cincinnati Bengals (1969–1971); New England Patriots (1971)

Awards and highlights
- Second-team All-East (1965)

Career NFL/AFL statistics
- Receptions: 164
- Receiving yards: 2,663
- Receiving touchdowns: 22
- Stats at Pro Football Reference

Eric Leslie Crabtree (born November 3, 1944) is an American former professional football player who was a wide receiver in the American Football League (AFL) and the National Football League (NFL). He played college football for the Pittsburgh Panthers. Crabtree played professionally for six seasons with the Denver Broncos (1966–1968), Cincinnati Bengals (1969–1971), and New England Patriots (1971).

== Early life ==
Crabtree was born on November 3, 1944, in Monessen, Pennsylvania, the son of a white father and African American mother. He spent considerable time with his mother's family in Brownsville, Pennsylvania while he was growing up.

He attended Monessen High School, playing football under coach Joe Gladys. He was one of the key players on Monessen's 1961 Western Pennsylvania Interscholastic Athletic League (WPIAL) championship team that won 11 games. Teammates Doug Crusan, Bill Malinchak and Sam Havrilak would also go on to play in the NFL. Crabtree was also a standout player of the school's basketball team, and played baseball as well. He considered playing professional baseball, but his mother discouraged him since she was concerned about him having to play in the South at that time, and so encouraged him to take a football scholarship instead.

Crabtree was selected All-State for football in both the 1960 and 1961 seasons. During 1960–61, he averaged 8.5 yards per rushing attempt, with 1,386 rushing yards and 23 touchdowns. He played in the Big 33 Football Classic, where he scored on a 54-yard pass and run play, and caught four other passes for 132 yards.

In 1998, Crabtree was inducted into the Mid Mon Valley Sports Hall of Fame.

== College football ==
Crabtree attended the University of Pittsburgh (Pitt) on a football scholarship, where he played on the football team from 1963 to 1965. Pitt had not recruited a black player since 1952, and this created some pressure on Crabtree to choose Pitt. He performed well as both a rusher and a receiver on offense. In 30 games over three years he averaged 4.6 yards per attempt running, in 190 carries; and had 68 receptions for 1,117 yards, with 9 touchdown catches. His most prolific year was as a senior, gaining over 1,000 total yards, including 45 receptions for 724 yards and four receiving touchdowns. The team had a 9–1 record in his sophomore season, and was ranked by the Associated Press (AP) as the number four team in the nation.

Crabtree was a two-way collegiate and scholastic player at Pitt. He played in the East-West Shrine game and received All-American recognition from United Press International (UPI), the Associated Press (AP) and Time Magazine.

== Professional football ==
Crabtree was selected by the Baltimore Colts in the 11th round of the 1966 NFL Draft (170th overall), and by the Denver Broncos in the 13th round of the 1966 AFL draft (112th overall). Crabtree chose to play for the Broncos. He played for three years in Denver under coach Lou Saban.

He did not start during the 1966 season, and had only one reception. In 1967, he started every game as a receiver, and had 46 receptions for 716 yards (15.6 yards per reception), with five touchdown catches. He ranked eighth in the AFL in number of receptions, and 11th in receiving yards and receiving touchdowns. He also started every game for Denver the following year, improving his yards per reception average to 17.2, and again catching five touchdown passes. The 17.2 average was 11th best in the AFL in 1968.

In 1968, Marlin Briscoe, playing for the Broncos, became the first African American to play at quarterback in the AFL, and the first black quarterback in modern American professional football. On his first play, he completed a 22-yard pass to Crabtree. He played sporadically at quarterback over the ensuing weeks, but eventually became the Broncos' starter. During this time, Crabtree would go to the Bronco's headquarters early in the day to sift through the mail, looking for hate mail and death threats sent to Briscoe, removing them before Briscoe could see them. It was not that much overall, but enough that it could have demoralized Briscoe. It would be decades before Crabtree told Briscoe about this.

Eric had the nickname "E-Tree" while on the Broncos, and roomed with future Pro Football Hall of Fame running back Floyd Little.

Crabtree was traded to the Cincinnati Bengals for Tom Smiley before the 1969 season. At Cincinnati, he played under two legendary coaches; head coach Paul Brown and wide receiver coach Bill Walsh. 1969 would be his best season in professional football. He had 40 receptions for 855 yards (21.4 yards per reception), with seven touchdowns. His 21.4 average yards per reception ranked fourth in the AFL, and he was tied for 6th in touchdown receptions. His production went down in 1970 (19 receptions for 231 and only seven games started). In 1971, his final season in the NFL, Crabtree was waived after seven games and was picked up by the New England Patriots, and played the last six games of his career for the Patriots.

== Legacy and honors ==
In 2015, Crabtree was inducted into the Pennsylvania Sports Hall of Fame.

== NFL/AFL career statistics ==
Legend
| **Bold** | Career high |

| Year | Team | Games | | Receiving | | | | |
| Year | Team | GP | GS | Rec | Yds | Avg | Lng | TD |
|---|---|---|---|---|---|---|---|---|
| 1966 | DEN | 14 | 0 | 1 | 38 | **38.0** | 38 | 0 |
| 1967 | DEN | 14 | 14 | **46** | 716 | 15.6 | **76** | 5 |
| 1968 | DEN | 14 | 14 | 35 | 601 | 17.2 | 72 | 5 |
| 1969 | CIN | 14 | 14 | 40 | **855** | 21.4 | 73 | **7** |
| 1970 | CIN | 14 | 7 | 19 | 231 | 12.2 | 29 | 2 |
| 1971 | CIN | 7 | 7 | 14 | 102 | 7.3 | 12 | 2 |
| 1971 | NWE | 6 | 4 | 9 | 120 | 13.3 | 31 | 1 |
| Career | | 83 | 60 | 164 | 2,663 | 16.2 | 76 | 22 |

== Personal life ==
Crabtree had established a business in Denver, which was a success for him in his years after football. In later years, however, he suffered from severe depression, and became a member of a class-action lawsuit by former players against the NFL over the effects of concussions and repeated head trauma. Crabtree was knocked out a number of times during his career, and after one hit in 1968 at Denver that knocked him completely unconscious where many thought he was dead.

== See also ==
- List of NCAA major college yearly punt and kickoff return leaders
- Other American Football League players
