= Estes Banks =

American football player (born 1945)

Estes McLeod Banks
No. 38
- Position: Running back

Personal information
- Born: December 18, 1945 (age 80); Los Angeles, California, U.S.
- Listed height: 6 ft 3 in (1.91 m)
- Listed weight: 215 lb (98 kg)

Career information
- High school: George Washington (Westmont, California)
- College: Colorado
- NFL draft: 1967: 8th round, 188th overall pick

Career history
- Oakland Raiders (1967); Cincinnati Bengals (1968)

Awards and highlights
- AFL champion (1967)

Career AFL statistics
- Rushing yards: 157
- Rushing average: 3.6
- Receptions: 4
- Receiving yards: 15
- Total touchdowns: 1
- Stats at Pro Football Reference

Estes McLeod Banks (born December 18, 1945) is an American former professional football player who was a running back in the American Football League (AFL). Banks played college football for the Colorado Buffaloes before being selected by the Oakland Raiders in the eighth round of the 1967 NFL/AFL draft. He played for the Raiders in 1967 and the Cincinnati Bengals in 1968.

== College career ==
Estes was recruited out of Washington High in Los Angeles to play football for the University of Colorado, which at the time was in the Big 8 conference. Estes made his debut in 1964, playing on a Buffaloes team that was ranked 110th in the national out of 120. The team went through a bevy of quarterbacks, Bernie McCall, Hale Irwin, and Dan Kelly, and none could lead the team to success. The Buffaloes finished with a record of 2-8 under head coach Eddie Crowder. For his first season in college football, Estes ended up with 81 carries for 273 yards and one touchdown. The following season, the Buffaloes improved. They finished with a 6-2 record, quarterback Bernie McCall led the conference in completion percentage, and Estes was the number one back, carrying the ball 114 times for 317 yards and five touchdowns. However, Estes saw his playing time and carries reduced in favor of Wilmer Cooks. Estes finished his college career with 230 carries for 726 yards and seven touchdowns.

== Pro Career ==
In the eighth round of the 1967 NFL/AFL draft, the Oakland Raiders selected Estes with the 188th overall pick. In his rookie season, Estes found little playing time on a team that was stocked at running back. The Raiders had Hewritt Dixon, whom head coach John Rauch converted from tight end. There was also Clem Daniels and Pete Banaszak ahead of Estes on the depth chart as well. The Raiders made it all the way to Super Bowl II, where they lost to the Green Bay Packers. Despite being on the roster, Estes did not play in the Super Bowl.

After the season, the Raiders exposed Estes in the expansion draft, and he was selected by the Cincinnati Bengals. Any chance of Estes earning the starting position ended when rookie Paul Robinson burst on the scene, and rushed for over 1,000 yards. Estes found himself in the same spot he was a year before in Oakland. Buried on the depth chart. This time he was playing behind Robinson, Essex Johnson and Tommie Smiley.

Banks pro career ended in 1969. In later years, Banks sued both the Raiders and Bengals, claiming injuries sustained while playing football effect his life in his later years.

== See also ==
- Other American Football League players
