= Al Richardson (linebacker) =

American football player (born 1957)

No. 56
- Position: Linebacker

Personal information
- Born: September 23, 1957 (age 69); Abbeville, Alabama, U.S.
- Listed height: 6 ft 2 in (1.88 m)
- Listed weight: 211 lb (96 kg)

Career information
- High school: Miami Central Senior (FL)
- College: Georgia Tech
- NFL draft: 1980: 8th round, 201st overall pick

Career history
- Atlanta Falcons (1980–1985)

Awards and highlights
- NFL Defensive Rookie of the Year co-winner (1980); PFWA All-Rookie Team (1980)

Career NFL statistics
- Games played: 77
- Sacks: 9
- Interceptions: 9
- Interception yards: 186
- Stats at Pro Football Reference

Alpette C. Richardson (born September 23, 1957) is an American former professional football player who was a linebacker in the National Football League (NFL) who spent six seasons with the Atlanta Falcons. He played college football for the Georgia Tech Yellow Jackets.

In his rookie season of 1980, Richardson set the record for most interceptions recorded by a linebacker (7), which he returned for 139 yards, while also recovering three fumbles. He won the AP Defensive Rookie of the Year in 1980 along with his teammate Buddy Curry, becoming the first (and so far only) time that two rookies shared the award in NFL history. Richardson made the NFL's All-Pro 2nd team. Richardson would have less to do in his next couple of seasons. He recorded an interception in 1981 and 1983 before retiring at the age of 28 in 1985. He finished his career with 9 interceptions, six fumble recoveries, and 9 sacks.
