= Speedy Thomas =

American football wide receiver (1947–2003)

Louis "Speedy" Thomas
No. 17
- Position: Wide receiver

Personal information
- Born: April 13, 1947; Houston, Texas, U.S.
- Died: July 23, 2003 (aged 56)
- Listed height: 6 ft 1 in (1.85 m)
- Listed weight: 170 lb (77 kg)

Career information
- High school: Booker T. Washington (Houston)
- College: Utah
- NFL draft: 1969: 3rd round, 57th overall pick

Career history
- Cincinnati Bengals (1969-1972); New Orleans Saints (1973–1974)

Career NFL/AFL statistics
- Receptions: 94
- Receiving yards: 1,239
- Touchdowns: 9
- Stats at Pro Football Reference

Louis "Speedy" Timothy Thomas (April 13, 1947 – July 29, 2003) was a professional American football wide receiver in the American Football League (AFL) and the National Football League (NFL). He played for the AFL's Cincinnati Bengals (1969) and the NFL's Bengals (1970–1972) and New Orleans Saints (1973–1974).

Thomas played football at Booker T. Washington High School in Houston, Texas.

He played college football at the University of Utah. During his senior season (1968), he was named first-team All-Western Athletic Conference (WAC), and he was selected to play in the annual all-star East-West Shrine Game.

He was drafted in the third round (57th overall) of the 1969 NFL/AFL draft by the second-year Cincinnati Bengals.

In 1969, Thomas had a big rookie year as a flanker for the AFL's Bengals. Playing all 14 games, he had 33 receptions for 481 yards (a 14.6 average) and three touchdowns. He set a new Bengals record for receptions in a game with seven (for 177 yards) against the Denver Broncos. For the season, he also had four carries for 16 yards and a touchdown, and he returned four punts for 15 yards.

His first professional touchdown was in week 2, when he caught a nine-yard touchdown pass from Greg Cook in a 24–30 win over the San Diego Chargers.

In 1970, with the Bengals now in the NFL due to the NFL/AFL merger, he again played 14 games, including 13 as a starter at wide receiver. He had 21 receptions for 257 yards (a 12.2 average) and two touchdowns, along with two carries for seven yards and four punt returns for 20 yards.

In 1971, he played 12 games, starting eight as wide receiver. He had 22 receptions for 327 yards (a 14.9 average). He also had his longest career reception and the longest in the NFL in 1971—a 90-yard touchdown pass from Virgil Carter in the season-opening game, a 37–14 win over the Philadelphia Eagles. He also returned four punts for 20 yards and had two carries for -1 yards.

In 1972, he played in 11 games, starting 10. He had 17 receptions for 171 yards (a 10.1 average) and one touchdown.

After four years with the Bengals, on July 9, 1973, he was traded to the New Orleans Saints for rookie defensive tackle Jerry Ellison.

In 1973 for the Saints, he played in six games with no statistics. In 1974, his sixth and last in pro football, he played in one game, with one reception for three yards.

== See also ==
- Other American Football League players
