= Buddy Curry =

American football player (born 1958)

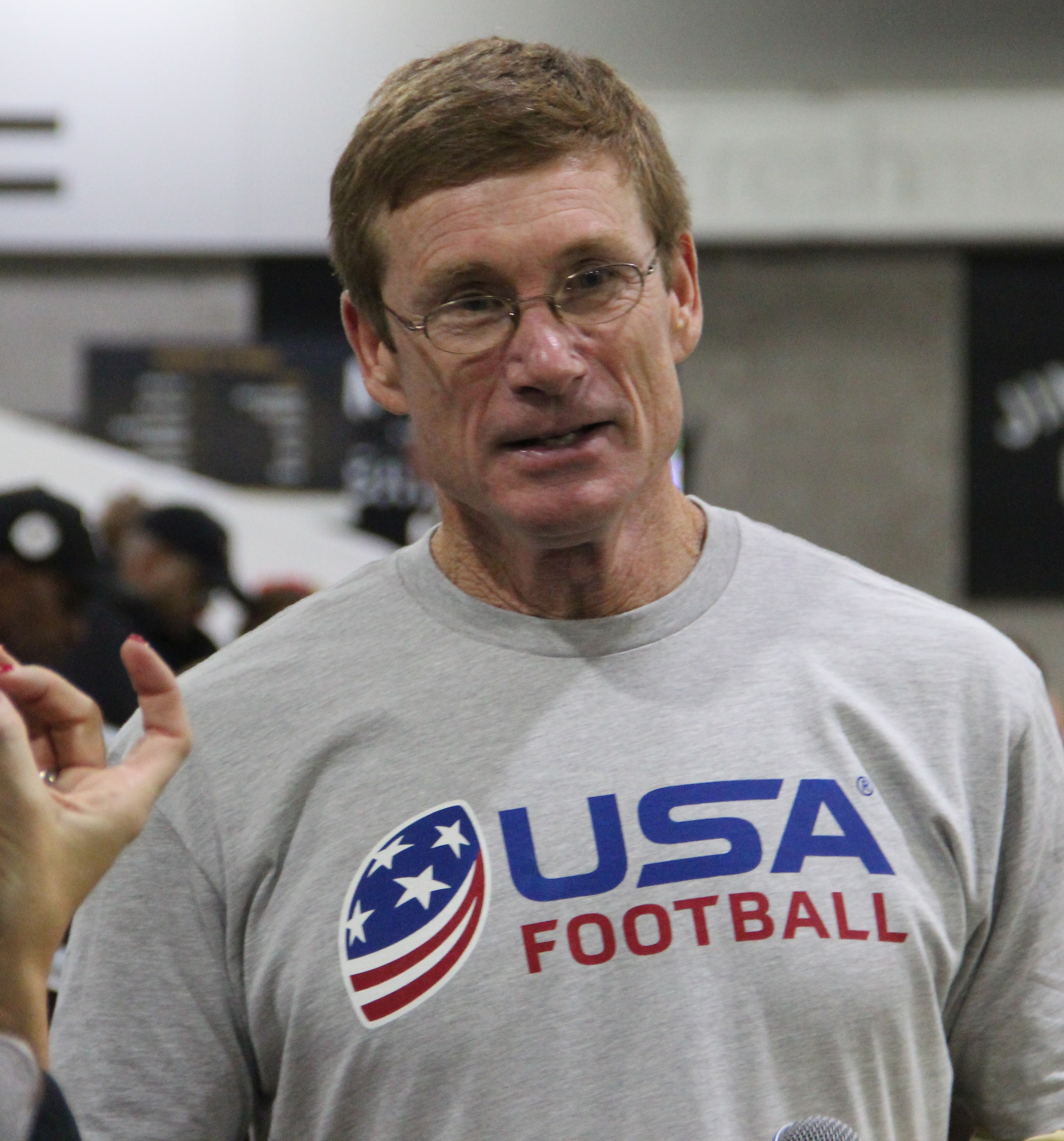
- Curry in 2018

No. 50
- Position: Linebacker

Personal information
- Born: June 4, 1958 (age 68); Greenville, North Carolina, U.S.
- Listed height: 6 ft 4 in (1.93 m)
- Listed weight: 224 lb (102 kg)

Career information
- High school: Danville (VA) George Washington
- College: North Carolina
- NFL draft: 1980: 2nd round, 36th overall pick

Career history
- Atlanta Falcons (1980–1987)

Awards and highlights
- NFL Defensive Rookie of the Year co-winner (1980); PFWA All-Rookie Team (1980); 2× First-team All-ACC (1977, 1979)

Career NFL statistics
- Sacks: 5.5
- Interceptions: 7
- Touchdowns: 1
- Stats at Pro Football Reference

George Jessel "Buddy" Curry (born June 4, 1958) is an American former professional football player who was a linebacker in the National Football League (NFL) for eight seasons from 1980 to 1987. He played college football for the North Carolina Tar Heels. A second-round pick in the 1980 NFL draft by the Atlanta Falcons, he and his Falcons teammate Al Richardson were selected as the 1980 NFL Defensive Rookie of the Year.

He is currently the head master trainer for USA Football's "Heads Up Football Program", which teaches youth athletes proper tackling techniques.

== Early life ==
Buddy Curry was the defensive stalwart on Coach Alger Pugh's fine mid-1970s George Washington Eagles teams in Danville, VA.

== College career ==
As linebacker, Curry was a starter in four seasons for the University of North Carolina. He recorded 12 total interceptions, ending his senior season with five.

== Professional career ==
In his rookie year, Curry co-shared the Defensive Rookie of the Year award with fellow Atlanta linebacker Al Richardson. In 1983, Curry made 229 tackles, which remains the most by a Falcons defender in a season, followed by Keith Brooking's 212 tackles in 2002. He led the team in tackles six times in his career, which included his first four seasons as a player. He blocked a field goal during a 26–14 victory against the Los Angeles Rams on October 12, 1986.

After retiring, he went into work as a salesman for ten years before becoming a Master Trainer for USA Football's "Heads Up Football Program", which teaches proper tackling techniques for youth athletes. In 2002, he founded Kids & Pros, a non-profit corporation to teach young children the fundamentals of the game with the help of retired NFL players. In 2015 (the 50th anniversary of the team), the Atlanta Journal-Constitution named him the 41st best Falcon in team history. In 2019, he was inducted into the Atlanta Sports Hall of Fame.
