= 1969 Oakland Raiders season =

AFL team season

- Owner: F. Wayne Valley
- General manager: Al Davis
- Head coach: John Madden
- Home stadium: Oakland–Alameda County Coliseum

Results
- Record: 12–1–1
- Division place: 1st AFL Western
- Playoffs: Won Divisional Playoffs (vs. Oilers) 56–7; Lost AFL Championship (vs. Chiefs) 7–17

The 1969 Oakland Raiders season was the team's tenth as a franchise, and tenth in both Oakland and the American Football League. The campaign saw the team attempt to improve upon its 12–2 record from 1968. The season is notable for being the last for the AFL, which merged into the NFL in 1970.

The Raiders stormed to a 12–1–1 record in 1969 and led the league in wins for a third consecutive season. In doing so, they posted a staggering 37–4–1 (.893) record over their final three years of AFL regular season play. The season ended with an upset loss at home in the AFL Championship Game to division rival Kansas City, the eventual Super Bowl champion.

Additionally, the season marked the debut of Hall of Fame head coach John Madden, previously the linebacker coach, promoted after the January departure of John Rauch for Buffalo. Madden led the Raiders to seven division titles, seven AFL/AFC Championship Games, and a Super Bowl championship before leaving after 1978, his tenth as head coach, with a 112–39–7 (.731) regular season record.

== Personnel ==
=== Staff / Coaches ===
1969 Oakland Raiders staff
Front office: Majority Co-Owner - F. Wayne Valley; Minority Co-Owner/General Manager - Al Davis; Minority Co-Owner: Ed McGah; President of the General Partner / General Manager – Al Davis; Senior Executive – John Herrera; Head coaches: Head coach – John Madden; Offensive coaches: Offensive Backs – John Polonchek; Ends Coach – Dick Wood; Offensive line – Ollie Spencer	Defensive coaches: Defensive Line – Tom Dahms; Linebackers – Sid Hall; Defensive Backfield – Richie McCabe; Special teams coaches: Special teams – John Rauch; Strength and conditioning: Strength and Conditioning - Marv Marinovich

=== Roster ===
1969 Oakland Raiders roster
Quarterbacks (QB): 16 George Blanda K; 3 Daryle Lamonica; Running backs (RB): 40 Pete Banaszak; 35 Hewritt Dixon; 39 Marv Hubbard; 23 Charlie Smith; 22 Larry Todd; Wide receivers (WR): 25 Fred Biletnikoff; 89 Drew Buie; 13 Rod Sherman; 81 Warren Wells; Tight ends (TE): 33 Billy Cannon; 36 Lloyd Edwards; 30 Roger Hagberg	Offensive linemen (OL): 64 George Buehler G; 70 Jim Harvey G; 65 Wayne Hawkins G; 00 Jim Otto C; 79 Harry Schuh T; 78 Art Shell T; 76 Bob Svihus T; 63 Gene Upshaw G; Defensive linemen (DL): 83 Ben Davidson DE; 71 Al Dotson DT; 74 Tom Keating DT; 77 Ike Lassiter DE; 85 Carleton Oats DT; 80 Art Thoms DT	Linebackers (LB): 50 Duane Benson OLB; 48 Bill Budness MLB; 55 Dan Conners MLB; 42 Bill Laskey OLB; 56 Chip Oliver OLB; 34 Gus Otto OLB; Defensive backs (DB): 43 George Atkinson SS; 24 Willie Brown CB; 45 Dave Grayson FS; 29 Howie Williams SS; 26 Nemiah Wilson CB; Special teams (ST): 11 Mike Eischeid P	Practice squad: 20 Jackie Allen CB; 46 Ed Hayes S; 31 Ken Newfield RB; 67 Harold Rice DE; Reserve: 21 Rodger Bird S (IR); 53 Dan Birdwell DT (IR); 10 Eldridge Dickey WR (IR); 47 Kent McCloughan CB (IR); 12 Ken Stabler QB (Left squad); Rookies in italics

== Regular season ==
=== Schedule ===
Week	Date	Opponent	Result	Record	Venue	Attendance	Recap
1	September 14	Houston Oilers	**W** 21–17	1–0	Oakland–Alameda County Coliseum	49,361	Recap
2	September 20	Miami Dolphins	**W** 20–17	2–0	Oakland–Alameda County Coliseum	50,277	Recap
3	September 28	at Boston Patriots	**W** 38–23	3–0	Alumni Stadium	19,069	Recap
4	October 4	at Miami Dolphins	**T** 20–20	3–0–1	Miami Orange Bowl	35,614	Recap
5	October 12	at **Denver Broncos**	**W** 24–14	4–0–1	Mile High Stadium	49,511	Recap
6	October 19	Buffalo Bills	**W** 50–21	5–0–1	Oakland–Alameda County Coliseum	54,418	Recap
7	October 26	at **San Diego Chargers**	**W** 24–12	6–0–1	San Diego Stadium	54,008	Recap
8	November 2	at **Cincinnati Bengals**	**L** 17–31	6–1–1	Nippert Stadium	27,927	Recap
9	November 9	**Denver Broncos**	**W** 41–10	7–1–1	Oakland–Alameda County Coliseum	54,416	Recap
10	November 16	**San Diego Chargers**	**W** 21–16	8–1–1	Oakland–Alameda County Coliseum	54,372	Recap
11	November 23	at **Kansas City Chiefs**	**W** 27–24	9–1–1	Municipal Stadium	51,982	Recap
12	November 30	at New York Jets	**W** 27–14	10–1–1	Shea Stadium	63,865	Recap
13	December 7	**Cincinnati Bengals**	**W** 37–17	11–1–1	Oakland–Alameda County Coliseum	54,427	Recap
14	December 13	**Kansas City Chiefs**	**W** 10–6	12–1–1	Oakland–Alameda County Coliseum	54,443	Recap
Note: Intra-division opponents are in **bold** text.

== Standings ==
AFL Western Division
	W	L	T	PCT	DIV	PF	PA	STK
Oakland Raiders	12	1	1	.923	7–1	377	242	W6
Kansas City Chiefs	11	3	0	.786	5–3	359	177	L1
San Diego Chargers	8	6	0	.571	2–6	288	276	W4
Denver Broncos	5	8	1	.385	3–5	297	344	W1
Cincinnati Bengals	4	9	1	.308	3–5	280	367	L5

Note: Tie games were not officially counted in the standings of the AFL.

=== Game summaries ===
==== Week 1 ====
Team	1	2	3	4	Total
Oilers	0	0	10	7	17
• Raiders	14	0	0	7	21

- Date: September 14
- Location: Oakland-Alameda County Coliseum
- Game weather: 60 °F (16 °C); wind 9 mph (14 km/h)

Scoring summary
Q1	OAK	Smith 5 yard run (Blanda kick)	OAK 7–0
Q1	OAK	Smith 5 yard run (Blanda kick)	OAK 14–0
Q3	HOU	Granger 1 yard run (Gerela kick)	OAK 14–7
Q3	HOU	Gerela 28 yard field goal	OAK 14–10
Q4	HOU	LeVias 15 yard pass from Beathard (Gerela kick)	HOU 17–14
Q4	OAK	Wells 64 yard pass from Lamonica (Blanda kick)	OAK 21–17

==== Week 6 ====
Team	1	2	3	4	Total
Bills	0	7	0	14	21
• Raiders	14	28	6	2	50

- Date: October 19
- Location: Oakland–Alameda County Coliseum, Oakland, California
- Game attendance: 54,418
- Game weather: 56 °F (13 °C) • Wind 8 mph (13 km/h)

Scoring summary
1	OAK	Billy Cannon 53 yard pass from Daryle Lamonica (George Blanda kick)	Raiders 7–0
1	OAK	Pete Banaszak 10 yard pass from Daryle Lamonica (George Blanda kick)	Raiders 14–0
2	OAK	Pete Banaszak 1 yard pass from Daryle Lamonica (George Blanda kick)	Raiders 21–0
2	OAK	Warren Wells 13 yard pass from Daryle Lamonica (George Blanda kick)	Raiders 28–0
2	OAK	Fred Biletnikoff 16 yard pass from Daryle Lamonica (George Blanda kick)	Raiders 35–0
2	OAK	Fred Biletnikoff 23 yard pass from Daryle Lamonica (George Blanda kick)	Raiders 42–0
2	BUF	Haven Moses 39 yard pass from James Harris (Bruce Alford kick)	Raiders 42–7
3	OAK	George Blanda 20 yard field goal	Raiders 45–7
3	OAK	George Blanda 36 yard field goal	Raiders 48–7
4	BUF	Bill Enyart 30 yard pass from Jack Kemp (Bruce Alford kick)	Raiders 48–14
4	BUF	Marlin Briscoe 50 yard pass from Jack Kemp (Bruce Alford kick)	Raiders 48–21
4	OAK	Safety, Kemp tackled by Dotson in end zone	Raiders 50–21

- Daryle Lamonica 21/36, 313 Yds, 6 TD

==== Week 14 ====
Team	1	2	3	4	Total
Chiefs	0	0	0	6	6
• Raiders	0	3	0	7	10

- Date: December 13
- Location: Oakland–Alameda County Coliseum, Oakland, California
- Game attendance: 54,443
- Game weather: 55 °F (13 °C); wind 7 mph (11 km/h)

Scoring summary
Q2	OAK	George Blanda 30 yard field goal	OAK 3–0
Q4	OAK	Charlie Smith 8 yard pass from Daryle Lamonica (George Blanda kick)	OAK 10–0
Q4	KC	Wendell Hayes 1 yard run (kick failed)	OAK 10–6

== Postseason ==
Round	Date	Opponent	Result	Venue	Attendance	Recap
Divisional	December 21	Houston Oilers	W 56–7	Oakland–Alameda County Coliseum	54,539	Recap
AFL Championship	January 4, 1970	Kansas City Chiefs	L 7–17	Oakland–Alameda County Coliseum	54,544	Recap

=== AFL championship game ===
	1	2	3	4	Total
Chiefs	0	7	7	3	17
Raiders	7	0	0	0	7

Kansas City Chiefs 17, Oakland Raiders 7

January 4, 1970, at Oakland–Alameda County Coliseum, Oakland, California

==== Scoring Summary ====
- OAK – Smith 3 run (Blanda kick)
- KC – Hayes 1 run (Stenerud kick)
- KC – Holmes 5 run (Stenerud kick)
- KC – Field goal Stenerud 22 Raiders lost and in 1970 the AFL merged with the NFL. Raiders lost to the Baltimore Colts in the AFC Championship Game 27–17.

== Awards and honors ==
- Daryle Lamonica, Co-AFL MVP
