= Les Shy =

American football player (born 1944)

No. 46, 25
- Position: Running back

Personal information
- Born: April 5, 1944 (age 82); Cleveland, Ohio, U.S.
- Listed height: 6 ft 1 in (1.85 m)
- Listed weight: 206 lb (93 kg)

Career information
- High school: Ganesha (CA)
- College: Long Beach State (1964-1965)
- NFL draft: 1966: 12th round, 173rd overall pick

Career history
- Dallas Cowboys (1966–1969); New York Giants (1970); Miami Dolphins (1972)*; Cincinnati Bengals (1972)
- * Offseason or practice squad member only

Career NFL statistics
- Rushing yards: 523
- Rushing average: 3.6
- Receptions: 23
- Receiving yards: 273
- Total touchdowns: 4
- Stats at Pro Football Reference

Les Shy (born April 5, 1944) is an American former professional football player who was a running back in the National Football League (NFL) for the Dallas Cowboys and New York Giants. He played college football for the Long Beach State 49ers.

== Early life ==
Shy attended Ganesha High School, before moving on to Mt. San Antonio College. After his sophomore season he transferred to Long Beach State University, where he played two years under head coach Don Reed, as the starter at the halfback position.

In 1964, he registered 354 rushing yards (6.1 yards average) and 5 touchdowns. The next year he was limited with injuries, but still managed 488 yards (4.8 yards average) and 7 touchdowns, despite being limited with injuries. The team only lost 3 games during his time at the school.

In 2000, he was inducted into the Long Beach State Hall of Fame.

== Professional career ==
=== Dallas Cowboys ===
Shy was selected in the 12th round (173rd overall) of the 1966 NFL draft. As a rookie, he was tried at defensive back, before settling at running back. Although he didn't make the initial 40-man roster, he was promoted from the taxi squad after the third game of the season. He carried the ball only 17 times in the year, averaging 6.9 yards per attempt.

In 1968, he was able to be more involved in the offense after the starter Dan Reeves was lost for the year with a serious knee injury. Following his best game as a pro against the St. Louis Cardinals with 89 rushing yards, he was passed on the depth chart by Craig Baynham for the starter job, finishing the year with 179 rushing yards, 105 receiving yards and 2 touchdowns.

In 1969, he slimmed down to 195 pounds to better compete for the halfback role, but with the sudden retirement of Don Perkins, he was moved in training camp to fullback to compete with Walt Garrison for the starting position. He remained a backup, registering 154 rushing yards, 124 receiving yards and 2 touchdowns.

On August 31, 1970, he appeared on the Sports Illustrated cover. He was waived on September 14, finishing his Cowboys career with 523 rushing yards and 3 touchdowns.

=== New York Giants ===
On September 23, 1970, he was signed by the New York Giants to their taxi squad. The next day he was promoted to the active roster, where he served as kickoff returner (21 returns for 544 yards with a 25.9-yard average). He was released on September 14, 1971.

=== Miami Dolphins ===
In 1972, he signed with the Miami Dolphins. On August 7, he was traded to the Cincinnati Bengals in exchange for fullback Ron Lamb.

=== Cincinnati Bengals ===
The Cincinnati Bengals traded for Shy to use him as a kickoff returner. He suffered an Achilles tendon injury in the third preseason game against the Miami Dolphins and was placed on the injured reserve list.

== Personal life ==
Shy was the sales director at Sports Brain. In the past he was involved in construction and property management. He also owned a restaurant in Pomona called Papa Shy's Pro Barbecue.

His brother Don Shy played running back seven seasons in the NFL for the Pittsburgh Steelers, New Orleans Saints, Chicago Bears, and St. Louis Cardinals. He was also a World-Class 110 meter hurdler, his time of 13.64 in 1966 was the second fastest in the world that year.
