= Curt Frazier =

American football player (born 1945)

No. 43
- Position: Cornerback

Personal information
- Born: March 11, 1945 (age 81); Berkeley, California, U.S.
- Listed height: 5 ft 11 in (1.80 m)
- Listed weight: 193 lb (88 kg)

Career information
- High school: Berkeley
- College: Fresno State

Career history
- Sacramento Buccaneers (1967); Cincinnati Bengals (1968)

Career statistics
- Games played: 14
- Stats at Pro Football Reference

Curtis L. Frazier (born March 11, 1945) is an American former professional football player who was a cornerback for one season with the Cincinnati Bengals of the American Football League (AFL) in 1968. He played college football for the Fresno State Bulldogs. He also played professionally for the Sacramento Buccaneers of the Continental Football League (COFL) in 1967.
