= Jimmy Smith (defensive back, born 1945) =

American football player (born 1945)

No. 47, 25
- Position: Defensive back

Personal information
- Born: July 12, 1945 (age 81); Stockton, California, U.S.
- Listed height: 6 ft 3 in (1.91 m)
- Listed weight: 190 lb (86 kg)

Career information
- High school: Edison (Stockton)
- College: Utah State (1967-1968)
- NFL draft: 1969: 10th round, 244th overall pick

Career history
- Denver Broncos (1969); Ottawa Rough Riders (1970)
- Stats at Pro Football Reference

James Earl Smith (born July 12, 1945) is an American former football defensive back. He played for the Denver Broncos in 1969.
