= Dale Livingston =

American football player (1945–2009)

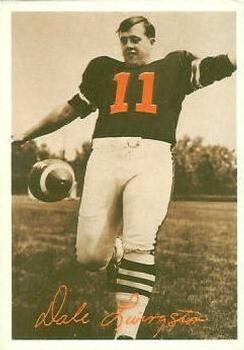

No. 11, 37, 9
- Positions: Placekicker, punter

Personal information
- Born: March 12, 1945; Plymouth, Michigan, U.S.
- Died: January 5, 2009 (aged 63); Green Bay, Wisconsin, U.S.
- Listed height: 6 ft 0 in (1.83 m)
- Listed weight: 210 lb (95 kg)

Career information
- High school: Plymouth (Canton, Michigan)
- College: Eastern Michigan (1964); Western Michigan (1965-1967)
- NFL draft: 1968: 3rd round, 83rd overall pick

Career history
- Cincinnati Bengals (1968-1969); Green Bay Packers (1970); Detroit Wheels (1974); Philadelphia Bell (1974)

Career NFL/AFL statistics
- Field goals: 28/54 (51.9%)
- Extra points: 39/41 (95.1%)
- Punts: 146
- Punt yards: 6,004
- Stats at Pro Football Reference

Dale Roger Livingston (March 12, 1945 – January 5, 2009) was an American professional football kicker and punter who became the starting kicker/punter on the Cincinnati Bengals first-team in 1968.

== College career ==
Livingston played college football at Western Michigan University. His kicking career had an unlikely start. He attended Western Michigan on a tennis scholarship. In 1965 Livingston was pulled from a social gathering at the University where Livingston was seen kicking punts of 70 yards in dress shoes. Impressed coach Bill Doolittle held an impromptu tryout at Waldo Stadium as Livingston immediately connected on a series of 35-55 yard field goals and 65+ yard punts.

He played on the Broncos' 1966 Mid-American Conference championship team. A successful onside kick and late field goal by Livingston against Ohio University in 1966 gave WMU a share of its first MAC title.

Livingston had an 86-yard punt against Kent State that is tied for the longest punt in Broncos history. During his WMU career, he averaged 39.9 yards per punt, including 43.3 in one season that ranks second all-time for the Broncos.

He was selected to play in the North-South All Star Game in 1967 and was named Second-team All-American.

== Professional football ==
Livingston was selected 83rd overall by the expansion Cincinnati Bengals in the third round of the 1968 NFL/AFL Draft. He became the first kicker in Bengals history, and was also the team's punter.

On September 6, 1968, in the Bengals first-ever regular-season game, he kicked the first extra point in Bengals history after a touchdown run by Paul Robinson to give the Bengals 7-0 lead over the San Diego Chargers. In the second quarter, he kicked the team's first-ever field goal, a 22-yarder in the second quarter to tie the game 10-10. The Chargers would go on to win 29-10.

The following week, he kicked a 49-yard field goal, his longest of the season, and three extra points in the Bengals first-ever win, 24-10 over the Denver Broncos. For the season, he made 13 field goals in 26 attempts and was 20-20 in extra points. He punted 70 times for a 43.4 average, including a season-high 66-yarder.

In the 1969 season, Livingston handled punting duties only as Horst Muhlmann became the team's kicker. Livingston again had 70 punts, this time for a 39.8 average. He also completed two passes for 17 yards.

During the Bengals training camp for the 1970 season, Livingston was released on Aug. 18, 1970.

He was signed by the Green Bay Packers as their kicker for the 1970 season. He led the Packers in scoring that season with 64 points. He made 15 of 28 field goal attempts was and 19 for 21 on extra points. He also punted six times for a 33.2 average.

In the Packers first-ever Monday Night Football game, Livingston's 14-yard field goal with 3:39 left in the game gave the Packers a 22-20 victory over the San Diego Chargers on Oct. 12, 1970 at San Diego.

== After football ==
Livingston sold insurance for 20 years after leaving the Packers. He then served as a teacher and coach at Freedom Middle School in Green Bay for 12 years.

In 1986, he was diagnosed with a type of Hodgkin's lymphoma but overcame the disease.

Livingston was inducted into the Western Michigan University Hall of Fame in October 2007. He retired from teaching in 2008.

Livingston resided in Ashwaubenon, Wisconsin near Green Bay at the time of his death on January 5, 2009. He had a wife, Elizabeth, and two sons, Dale Jr. and Christopher, plus four granddaughters.
