= Harry Gunner =

American football player (born 1944)

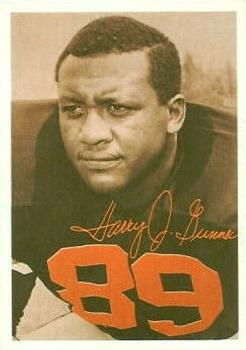

No. 89, 78
- Position: Defensive end

Personal information
- Born: November 25, 1944 (age 81); Port Arthur, Texas, U.S.
- Listed height: 6 ft 6 in (1.98 m)
- Listed weight: 250 lb (113 kg)

Career information
- High school: Lincoln (Port Arthur)
- College: Oregon State
- NFL draft: 1968: 8th round, 193rd overall pick

Career history
- Cincinnati Bengals (1968-1969); Chicago Bears (1970)

Awards and highlights
- Second-team All-Pac-8 (1967)

Career NFL/AFL statistics
- Fumble recoveries: 2
- Interceptions: 2
- Touchdowns: 1
- Sacks: 7
- Stats at Pro Football Reference

Harry James Gunner (born November 25, 1944) is an American former professional football player who was a defensive end in the National Football League (NFL). He played for the Cincinnati Bengals from 1968 to 1969 and for the Chicago Bears in 1970. Gunner played football and basketball at Oregon State University, where he was one of the first two African-Americans to play for the school as a scholarship athlete.
