= Dave Middendorf =

American football player (born 1945)

No. 68
- Position: Guard

Personal information
- Born: November 23, 1945 (age 80); Seattle, Washington, U.S.
- Listed height: 6 ft 3 in (1.91 m)
- Listed weight: 260 lb (118 kg)

Career information
- High school: Ingraham (Seattle)
- College: Washington State (1964-1967)
- NFL draft: 1968: 5th round, 112th overall pick

Career history
- Cincinnati Bengals (1968-1969); New York Jets (1970); Houston Texans-Shreveport Steamer (1974)

Awards and highlights
- First-team All-Pac-8 (1967); Second-team All-Pac-8 (1965)

Career NFL/AFL statistics
- Games played: 34
- Games started: 16
- Fumble recoveries: 3
- Stats at Pro Football Reference

Dave Middendorf (born November 23, 1945) is an American former professional football player who was a guard in the National Football League (NFL). He played college football for the Washington State Cougars. He played in the NFL for the Cincinnati Bengals from 1968 to 1969 and for the New York Jets in 1970.
