= Ron Lamb =

American football player (1944–2000)

Ronald Lamb
No. 40
- Position: Running back

Personal information
- Born: February 3, 1944; New London, Connecticut, U.S.
- Died: June 20, 2000 (aged 56); Greenwood County, South Carolina, U.S.
- Listed height: 6 ft 2 in (1.88 m)
- Listed weight: 225 lb (102 kg)

Career information
- High school: McCormick (McCormick, South Carolina)
- College: South Carolina
- NFL draft: 1966: 13th round, 190th overall pick

Career history
- Dallas Cowboys (1966)*; Montreal Beavers (1966–1967); Denver Broncos (1968); Cincinnati Bengals (1968–1971); Miami Dolphins (1972)*; Atlanta Falcons (1972); Washington Redskins (1973)*; Jacksonville Sharks (1974)
- * Offseason or practice squad member only

Career NFL/AFL statistics
- Rushing yards: 163
- Rushing average: 3
- Receptions: 8
- Receiving yards: 97
- Stats at Pro Football Reference

Ronald Lamb (February 3, 1944 – June 20, 2000) was an American professional football running back in the American Football League (AFL) for the Denver Broncos, Cincinnati Bengals and Atlanta Falcons. He played college football at the University of South Carolina.

== Early life ==
Lamb attended McCormick High School where he was a three-sport athlete. He accepted a football scholarship from the University of South Carolina, where he played wingback and halfback. He also received All-Conference honors as a baseball player.

== Professional career ==
Lamb was selected by the Dallas Cowboys in the 13th round (190th overall) of the 1966 NFL draft. He was released after being tried at fullback and flanker, before the start of the season.

In 1966, he signed with the Montreal Beavers of the Continental Football League, reuniting with his former South Carolina head coach Marvin Bass. He was sold to the Denver Broncos on October 31, 1967.

In 1967, he signed with the Denver Broncos but was limited with a knee injury and was placed on the taxi squad. The next year he earned the starting fullback position. On September 19, 1968, after starting three games he was placed on the injury waiver list, with a neck injury.

On October 21, 1968, he was claimed off waivers by the Cincinnati Bengals, where he was a reserve player. On August 7, 1972, he was traded to the Miami Dolphins in exchange for fullback Les Shy. He was released before the start of the season.

On September 5, 1972, he was claimed off waivers by the Atlanta Falcons. He was activated on September 15, after spending the first two games on the taxi squad. He was waived during the offseason.

In 1973, he signed with the Washington Redskins and was released on August 6.

In 1974, he signed with the Jacksonville Sharks of the World Football League. He announced his retirement on July 28, 1975, after receiving an offer to become a full-time assistant coach with the team.

== Personal life ==
After his retirement from football, he suffered from alcohol abuse which damaged his heart and liver. He died on June 20, 2000.
