= Charlie King (American football) =

American football player (1943–2026)

No. 47
- Position: Defensive back

Personal information
- Born: January 7, 1943; Alliance, Ohio, U.S.
- Died: July 13, 2026 (aged 83); Selma, Alabama, U.S.
- Listed height: 6 ft 0 in (1.83 m)
- Listed weight: 184 lb (83 kg)

Career information
- High school: Alliance (Alliance, Ohio)
- College: Purdue
- NFL draft: 1965: 18th round, 252nd overall pick
- AFL draft: 1965: 8th round, 64th overall pick

Career history
- Buffalo Bills (1966–1967); Cincinnati Bengals (1968–1969)
- Stats at Pro Football Reference

Charles Ronnie King (January 7, 1943 – July 13, 2026) was an American professional football player who was a defensive back for the Buffalo Bills and the Cincinnati Bengals of American Football League (AFL). He played college football for the Purdue Boilermakers. King died in Selma, Alabama on July 13, 2026, at the age of 83.
