= Fran Lynch =

American football player (1945–2014)

No. 35, 22
- Position: Running back

Personal information
- Born: December 3, 1945; Bridgeport, Connecticut, U.S.
- Died: October 1, 2014 (aged 68); Broomfield, Colorado, U.S.
- Listed height: 6 ft 1 in (1.85 m)
- Listed weight: 205 lb (93 kg)

Career information
- High school: Fairfield Ludlowe (Fairfield, Connecticut)
- College: Hofstra
- NFL draft: 1967: 5th round, 110th overall pick

Career history
- Denver Broncos (1967-1975)

Career NFL/AFL statistics
- Rushing yards: 1,258
- Rushing average: 4.1
- Receptions: 35
- Receiving yards: 357
- Total touchdowns: 14
- Stats at Pro Football Reference

Fran Lynch (December 13, 1945 – October 1, 2014) was an American collegiate and professional football running back. He played for the Denver Broncos for his entire career, in the American Football League (AFL) from 1967 to 1969 and in the National Football League (NFL) from 1970 to 1976. He missed his final season of 1976 with a knee injury. Before his Pro Football career, he played for Hofstra University.

== See also ==
- Other American Football league players
