= Wandy Williams =

American football player (born 1946)

No. 29
- Position: Running back

Personal information
- Born: January 3, 1946 (age 80); New York, New York, U.S.
- Listed height: 6 ft 1 in (1.85 m)
- Listed weight: 189 lb (86 kg)

Career information
- High school: Malverne (Malverne, New York)
- College: Kansas; Hofstra (1966-1968)
- NFL draft: 1969: 6th round, 131st overall pick

Career history
- Denver Broncos (1969–1970)

Career NFL/AFL statistics
- Rushing yards: 18
- Rushing average: 1.8
- Receptions: 5
- Receiving yards: 56
- Total touchdowns: 1
- Stats at Pro Football Reference

Wandy Williams (born January 3, 1946) is an American former professional football player who was a running back for the Denver Broncos of the American Football League[ (AFL) and National Football League (NFL) from 1969 to 1970. He played college football for the Kansas Jayhawks and Hofstra Pride.
