= Wayne McClure =

American football player (1942–2005)

No. 66, 65
- Position: Linebacker

Personal information
- Born: July 2, 1942; Maryville, Tennessee, U.S.
- Died: June 12, 2005 (aged 62); Covington, Louisiana, U.S.
- Listed height: 6 ft 1 in (1.85 m)
- Listed weight: 225 lb (102 kg)

Career information
- High school: Hattiesburg (Hattiesburg, Mississippi)
- College: Mississippi (1964–1967)
- NFL draft: 1968: 9th round, 239th overall pick

Career history
- Kansas City Chiefs (1968)*; Cincinnati Bengals (1968–1970)
- * Offseason or practice squad member only

Career NFL/AFL statistics
- Sacks: 1
- Stats at Pro Football Reference

Wayne Leroy McClure, Jr. (July 2, 1942 – June 12, 2005) was an American professional football linebacker who played two seasons with the Cincinnati Bengals of the American Football League (AFL) and National Football League (NFL). He was selected by the Kansas City Chiefs in the ninth round of the 1968 NFL/AFL draft. He played college football at the University of Mississippi.

== Early life and college ==
Wayne Leroy McClure, Jr. was born on July 2, 1942, in Maryville, Tennessee. He attended Hattiesburg High School in Hattiesburg, Mississippi.

He was a member of the Ole Miss Rebels of the University of Mississippi from 1964 to 1967 and a three-year letterman from 1965 to 1967.

== Professional career ==
McClure was selected by the Kansas City Chiefs of the AFL in the ninth round, with the 239th overall pick, of the 1968 NFL/AFL draft. He was waived by the Chiefs in August 1968.

McClure was claimed off waivers by the Cincinnati Bengals on August 28, 1968. He played in 13 games, starting two, during his rookie year in 1968, recording one sack and one kick return for 11 yards. He was placed on injured reserve in 1969 and did not appear in any games that season. McClure played in all 14 games for the Bengals in 1970. He also appeared in one playoff game that year. He was released by the Bengals in 1971.

== Personal life ==
McClure died on June 12, 2005, in Covington, Louisiana.
