= Bill Kindricks =

American football player (1946–2015)

No. 65, 72
- Position: Defensive tackle

Personal information
- Born: July 24, 1946; Tuskegee, Alabama, U.S.
- Died: June 8, 2015 (aged 68); Mableton, Georgia, U.S.
- Listed height: 6 ft 3 in (1.91 m)
- Listed weight: 268 lb (122 kg)

Career information
- High school: J.W. Drayton (Opelika, Alabama)
- College: Alabama A&M (1964-1967)
- NFL draft: 1968: 6th round, 143rd overall pick

Career history
- Cincinnati Bengals (1968); Oakland Raiders (1968)*; Spokane Shockers (1969)
- * Offseason or practice squad member only

Career AFL statistics
- Fumble recoveries: 1
- Stats at Pro Football Reference

William Alfred "Bill" Kindricks (July 24, 1946 – June 8, 2015) was an American football defensive tackle who played one season for the Cincinnati Bengals. He was also on the Oakland Raiders but did not play for them. In his second season he played in the Continental Football League (COFL) for the Spokane Shockers.
