= Paul Robinson (American football) =

American football player (born 1944)

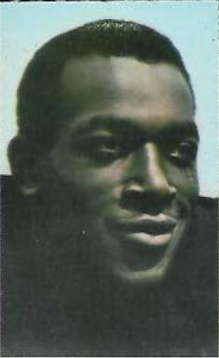
- Robinson in 1969

No. 18
- Position: Running back

Personal information
- Born: December 19, 1944 (age 81); Tucson, Arizona, U.S.
- Listed height: 6 ft 0 in (1.83 m)
- Listed weight: 198 lb (90 kg)

Career information
- High school: Marana (Marana, Arizona)
- College: Arizona (1966-1967)
- NFL draft: 1968: 3rd round, 82nd overall pick

Career history
- Cincinnati Bengals (1968–1972); Houston Oilers (1972–1973); Birmingham Americans (1974)

Awards and highlights
- First-team All-AFL (1968); 2× AFL All-Star (1968, 1969); American Football League Rookie of the Year (1968); AFL rushing touchdowns leader (1968); AFL rushing yards leader (1968)

Career NFL/AFL statistics
- Rushing yards: 2,947
- Rushing average: 4
- Receptions: 90
- Receiving yards: 612
- Total touchdowns: 26
- Stats at Pro Football Reference

Paul Harvey Robinson (born December 19, 1944) is an American former professional football player who was a running back for two seasons in the American Football League (AFL) and four seasons in the National Football League (NFL). He played college football for the Arizona Wildcats.

== Early life ==
Robinson was born on December 19, 1944, in Tucson, Arizona. He was the third youngest of 12 children of Leslie Robinson Sr. (1907–1987) and Levada Mallard Robinson (1909–1956), both of Crockett, Texas, who were married in 1926.

In 1951, the family moved to Marana, Arizona (principally located in Pima County) where Leslie worked as a farm contractor. Robinson attended Marana High School, where he starred in basketball and football, but he especially excelled at track. He was a state champion hurdler and sprinter, and set records in high hurdles and the pole vault. As a senior, he was the second leading scorer on a basketball team that was the runner up for the state championship, led the football team in scoring, and was first team Class B All-State at halfback. He was an honor student as well as an athlete, and was named Marana's Athlete of the Year in May of 1963.

== College career ==
Robinson graduated from high school in 1963 and attended Eastern Arizona College, a two-year community college in Thatcher, Arizona. As a member of its track team, he reached the nationals in intermediate hurdles; but he did not play football at Eastern Arizona. He received a track scholarship to the University of Arizona and ran track for two years for the Wildcats. But when his track scholarship ended, Robinson turned to football out of necessity for one season to obtain a new scholarship to be able to complete school and graduate. He had not played football since high school. Future NFL player Ron Gardin, then a collegian at Arizona and later Robinson's roommate, had seen Robinson at track tryouts a season earlier, and realizing Robinson's potential encouraged him join the football team. Robinson became the team's number two running back his senior year. However, he was injured during that senior year, and only had 80 rushing attempts for 306 yards.

== Professional career ==
To his own surprise, after playing only one year of college football, Robinson was chosen in the third round (82nd overall) of the 1968 NFL/AFL draft by the Cincinnati Bengals. The legendary Paul Brown chose him in the draft. Robinson received a $15,000 bonus and $15,000 salary, and used part of the money to buy his father in Arizona a new home, and to get his father out of working in the cotton fields.

In his first year as a professional, he gained 1,023 yards rushing to lead the American Football League (AFL), and also led the AFL with eight rushing touchdowns and 238 rushing attempts. His was fifth in the AFL in rushing average, but first among runners with over 175 carries. He also caught 24 passes for 128 yards and one touchdown.

Robinson was the only rookie coming directly from college in AFL history to rush for over 1,000 yards. In 1934, Beattie Feathers' of the National Football League's (NFL) Chicago Bears gained 1,004 yards rushing in his rookie season in only 11 games. Since that time, Robinson became the second man to gain over 1,000 yards in his first year in professional football in the U.S., after Cookie Gilchrist did it for the Buffalo Bills in 1962. Robinson and Feathers were the only rookies coming directly out of college to lead their leagues in rushing. Gilchrist came to the Bills after six years in the Canadian Football League. Robinson is the only running back in professional football history to gain over 1,000 yards in a season for a first-year expansion team.

He was the 1968 Associated Press (AP), United Press International and The Sporting News AFL Offensive Rookie of the Year. Robinson finished eighth in AP's AFL Most Valuable Player (MVP) voting to Joe Namath. It has also been stated that he was second in that year's MVP vote to Namath. He was named first-team AFL All-Pro by the Associated Press, Sporting News and Newspaper Enterprise Association (NEA), among others. He was the only rookie named to the All-AFL team. Robinson was named to the 1968 and 1969 AFL All-Star Teams, including as a starter in his rookie season. He led the 1968 Western AFL All-Star team to victory over the Eastern All-Stars, scoring two touchdowns.

Robinson scored the first-ever Bengals regular-season touchdown on September 6, 1968. His two-yard run gave the Bengals a 7–0 lead over the San Diego Chargers at San Diego, although the Bengals lost 29–13.

Robinson injured his knee the following off-season, and was never the same again. In his second season, 1969, he gained 489 yards in 160 attempts for a 3.1 yards-per-carry average and four touchdowns. He rebounded his third season, 1970, for 622 yards in 149 attempts for a 4.2 average and six touchdowns.

In 1971, he gained 213 yards on 49 carries for a 4.3 average with one touchdown. In 1972, in four games with the Bengals, he gained 94 yards in 21 attempts, a 4.5 average. On October 24, 1972, he was traded along with running back Fred Willis to the Houston Oilers for wide receiver Charlie Joiner and linebacker Ron Pritchard. For the Oilers, he played in eight games, gaining 355 yards on 86 attempts for a 4.1 average and three touchdowns. His final year in the NFL was 1973 for the Oilers, when he gained 151 yards on 34 attempts for a 4.4 average and two touchdowns.

For his career, he gained 2,947 yards on 737 carries for a 4.0 average with 24 touchdowns. He caught 90 passes for 612 yards (a 6.8 average) for two touchdowns. He returned 40 kicks for 924 yards, a 23.1 average, and he returned two punts for one yard.

In 1974, he played for the Birmingham Americans of the World Football League, where he helped the Americans win the WFL’s only championship game before the team folded during the offseason.

== NFL/AFL career statistics ==
Legend
| | Led the league |
| **Bold** | Career high |

=== Regular season ===
| Year | Team | Games | | Rushing | | | | | Receiving | | | | |
| Year | Team | GP | GS | Att | Yds | Avg | Lng | TD | Rec | Yds | Avg | Lng | TD |
|---|---|---|---|---|---|---|---|---|---|---|---|---|---|
| 1968 | CIN | 14 | 14 | **238** | **1,023** | 4.3 | **87** | **8** | **24** | 128 | 5.3 | **68** | **1** |
| 1969 | CIN | 14 | 14 | 160 | 489 | 3.1 | 24 | 4 | 20 | 104 | 5.2 | 25 | 0 |
| 1970 | CIN | 14 | 14 | 149 | 622 | 4.2 | 26 | 6 | 17 | **175** | **10.3** | 27 | **1** |
| 1971 | CIN | 14 | 8 | 49 | 213 | 4.3 | 17 | 1 | 8 | 47 | 5.9 | 16 | 0 |
| 1972 | CIN | 4 | 0 | 21 | 94 | **4.5** | 15 | 0 | 0 | 0 | 0.0 | 0 | 0 |
| 1972 | HOU | 8 | 7 | 86 | 355 | 4.1 | 30 | 3 | 14 | 112 | 8.0 | 24 | 0 |
| 1973 | HOU | 11 | 1 | 34 | 151 | 4.4 | 22 | 2 | 7 | 46 | 6.6 | 19 | 0 |
| | | 79 | 58 | 737 | 2,947 | 4.0 | 87 | 24 | 90 | 612 | 6.8 | 68 | 2 |

== Personal life ==
Paul Robinson was married to the late Arlene (Hines) Robinson. They had three daughters and also a son, Paul Harvey "PJ" Robinson Jr., who died in 2009. His brother Cleo was also a high school hurdler at Marana, played on its first state champion football team, and later served as a football official for decades in the Pac-12 conference. Paul is also the granduncle of Atlanta Falcons running back Bijan Robinson, Cleo's grandson.

Robinson currently resides in Safford, Arizona. Robinson operated a nightclub in Safford, the Blue Magic, which had been the only black owned business in Safford. Before the club, he also did work in mines and was a substitute teacher. He served as an assistant coach at Eastern Arizona, and ultimately became a probation officer in Graham County, Arizona. In 2007, he received the Pride of Safford Award from city officials.

In 1991, Robinson was inducted into the Pima County Sports Hall of Fame.

== See also ==
- Other American Football League players
