= Tom Smiley =

American football player (1944–2012)

No. 45, 39
- Position: Running back

Personal information
- Born: February 18, 1944; Port Arthur, Texas, U.S.
- Died: October 10, 2012 (aged 68); Beaumont, Texas, U.S.
- Listed height: 6 ft 1 in (1.85 m)
- Listed weight: 235 lb (107 kg)

Career information
- High school: Port Arthur
- College: Arizona; Lamar (1965-1967)
- NFL draft: 1968: 2nd round, 55th overall pick

Career history
- Cincinnati Bengals (1968); Denver Broncos (1969); Houston Oilers (1970)

Career NFL/AFL statistics
- Rushing yards: 312
- Rushing average: 2.6
- Receptions: 24
- Receiving yards: 109
- Total touchdowns: 5
- Stats at Pro Football Reference

Tommie Belton Smiley Jr. (February 18, 1944 – October 10, 2012) was an American professional football player. Smiley caught the first pass in Cincinnati Bengals history, a 2-yard reception from quarterback Dewey Warren on September 6, 1968.

== College career ==
Tommie Smiley was recruited by The University of Arizona out of Port Arthur High School in Texas. Smiley transferred to Lamar University, where he established himself as the top back for the program. Smiley played for Lamar from 1965-1967. Smiley was a bruising fullback who finished his career with 1,781 career rushing yards, which was good to end his tenure second all-time in rushing yards for the school.

== Pro Career ==
In 1968, the Cincinnati Bengals selected Smiley in the draft, in the second round, making him the 55th player selected overall. Coach Paul Brown used Smiley to offset the speedy Paul Robinson, who rushed for over 1,000 for the expansion Bengals. Smiley played in eight games as a rookie, starting in seven on them. In his rookie season, Smiley rushed for 146 yards on 63 carries and one touchdown.

The following season, the Denver Broncos acquired Smiley's services. In his lone season in Denver, Smiley was active for all 14 games, and played in 9 of them. He finished the season with 166 yards on 56 carries, sharing backfield time with Floyd Little and Fran Lynch.

Smiley then moved on to the Houston Oilers. Playing for the hapless Oilers, Smiley only had one carry for zero yards. He drew his release midseason and was out of football.

== Personal life ==
In 1976, Smiley was inducted into Lamar University athletic hall of fame.
