= Greg Cook =

American football player (1946–2012)

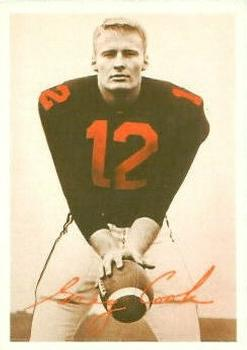

No. 12
- Position: Quarterback

Personal information
- Born: November 20, 1946; Dayton, Ohio, U.S.
- Died: January 27, 2012 (aged 65); Cincinnati, Ohio, U.S.
- Listed height: 6 ft 4 in (1.93 m)
- Listed weight: 220 lb (100 kg)

Career information
- High school: Chillicothe (Chillicothe, Ohio)
- College: Cincinnati (1965-1968)
- NFL draft: 1969: 1st round, 5th overall pick

Career history
- Cincinnati Bengals (1969–1974); Kansas City Chiefs (1975)*
- * Offseason or practice squad member only

Awards and highlights
- AFL Rookie of the Year (1969); AFL passer rating leader (1969); Second-team All-American (1968); NCAA passing yards leader (1968)

Career NFL/AFL statistics
- Passing attempts: 200
- Passing completions: 107
- Completion percentage: 53.5%
- TD–INT: 15–11
- Passing yards: 1,865
- Passer rating: 87.6
- Rushing yards: 148
- Rushing touchdowns: 1
- Stats at Pro Football Reference

Gregory Lynn Cook (November 20, 1946 – January 27, 2012) was an American professional football player who was a quarterback for two seasons in the American Football League (AFL) and later the National Football League (NFL). He played college football for the Cincinnati Bearcats and was selected fifth overall in the 1969 NFL/AFL draft. Once considered a rising star for the Cincinnati Bengals, he had his pro career prematurely ended by recurring shoulder troubles.

In 2007, NFL Films named Cook as the number one greatest NFL "one-shot wonder" of all time, describing him as one of the biggest "what-ifs" in league history, in the seventh installment of its program NFL Top 10.

== Early life ==
Cook lived most of his life in Chillicothe, Ohio, where he played baseball, basketball and football at Chillicothe High School.

He played collegiately at the University of Cincinnati, once throwing for 554 yards in a game. He was selected by the Cincinnati Bengals in the first round of the 1969 NFL/AFL draft after Bengals coach and founder Paul Brown saw Cook's performance in the Bearcats' come-from-behind, 23–21 victory against Miami University in Bo Schembechler's last game before he left to coach at the University of Michigan. Brown had attended the game, but left when the Miami Redskins' lead reached 21–6. "That quarterback. That's our draft choice," said Brown after seeing film of Cook's rallying performance.

== Professional career ==
In 1969, the Bengals released John Stofa, the starting signal caller for much of the team's inaugural season, and named Cook as the starting quarterback. His season started spectacularly, as he led the Bengals to a 3–0 record. However, in game three versus Kansas City, Cook felt a pop in his right (throwing) shoulder after being tackled by linebacker Jim Lynch and missed the next three games. Possibly due to the limited medical technology at the time, his torn rotator cuff went undiagnosed.

Despite this, Cook went on to pass for 1,854 yards and led the Bengals to wins over the Chiefs and the Oakland Raiders, two of the three best teams in the AFL. His 9.411 yards per pass attempt (YPA) and 17.5 yard per completion are rookie records that still stand; Cook's 9.41 YPA remains a Bengals franchise record. Cook was UPI's choice for AFL Rookie of the year.

Cook recalled, "I took cortisone shots and played in pain, but the shoulder hadn't started to deteriorate yet, so I could still function. I still had the strength. I felt obligated to finish the season. I'd gotten off to a good start. I didn't want to relinquish that."

The rotator cuff began deteriorating after the season; during surgery, it was revealed that Cook also had a partially detached biceps muscle. After three operations proved futile, he retired. Cook saw action in one game during a 1973 comeback attempt, but he retired permanently after. The NFL Network NFL Top Ten series named Cook the #1 One Shot Wonder in NFL history.

Former New York Jets quarterback Chad Pennington, who suffered two tears to his rotator cuff and underwent as many surgeries to repair it, was often compared to Cook because their injuries were so similar. Cook's injury was also similar to one suffered by New Orleans Saints quarterback Drew Brees, who had surgery on his rotator cuff after the 2005–06 season.

Cook finished his career with 1,865 passing yards with an average of 17.4 yards per completion. He threw 15 touchdowns in his career and 11 interceptions.

== Life after football ==
Following retirement, Cook lived in Cincinnati, and worked with United Parcel Service and with Worksite Information Network as a motivational speaker for labor unions. He was an art major at the University of Cincinnati, and continued to paint. Cook had works on display in the Ohio Governor's Mansion. Cook did some color commentary of University of Cincinnati football broadcasts in the mid-1980s.

== Death ==
Cook died on January 27, 2012, shortly after being admitted to The Christ Hospital, a Cincinnati-area hospital, with pneumonia.

== See also ==
- List of American Football League players
- List of NCAA major college football yearly passing leaders
- List of NCAA major college football yearly total offense leaders
