= 2002 Cincinnati Bengals season =

NFL team season

- Head coach: Dick LeBeau
- Home stadium: Paul Brown Stadium

Results
- Record: 2–14
- Division place: 4th AFC North
- Playoffs: Did not qualify
- Pro Bowlers: FB Lorenzo Neal

The 2002 Cincinnati Bengals season was the franchise's 33rd season in the National Football League (NFL), the 35th overall, and the second and final full season under head coach Dick LeBeau. With a record of 2–14, however, they were the worst team in football in 2002. The team's struggles continued as they lost their first seven contests losing by an average of 19 points in each game. The Bengals would finally garner their first victory in Week 8 by soundly defeating the expansion Houston Texans on the road 38–3. The winning would not last long, however, as the Bengals lost their next six games to fall to 1–13, this lethargic result was later matched by the 2019 team, which also finished at 2–14.

In their final game at home, the Bengals would stun the New Orleans Saints 20–13 to earn their second win on the season, but there would be no saving the Bengals from setting a new franchise record for losses as they finished the season with a 27–9 loss to the Buffalo Bills on the road to finish with a league-worst 2–14 record. This resulted in the Bengals owner Mike Brown firing head coach Dick LeBeau and replacing him with Washington's defensive coordinator Marvin Lewis.

By being the worst team in 2002, they earned the first pick in the 2003 NFL draft, which they would use to draft Heisman Trophy winning quarterback Carson Palmer out of USC, and releasing embattled quarterback Akili Smith.

== Offseason ==
Additions	Subtractions
QB Gus Frerotte (Broncos)	TE Tony McGee (Cowboys)
WR Michael Westbrook (Redskins)	WR Darnay Scott (Cowboys)
CB Jeff Burris (Colts)	FS Chris Carter (Texans)

=== NFL draft ===
2002 Cincinnati Bengals draft
Round	Pick	Player	Position	College	Notes
1	10	Levi Jones	Offensive tackle	Arizona State	
2	41	Lamont Thompson	Safety	Washington State	
3	67	Matt Schobel	Tight end	TCU	
4	109	Travis Dorsch	Punter	Purdue	
6	181	Marquand Manuel	Safety	Florida	
7	219	Joey Evans	Defensive end	North Carolina	
Made roster

=== Undrafted free agents ===
2002 undrafted free agents of note
Player	Position	College
Chris Archie	Wide receiver	Eastern Michigan
Justin Bland	Offensive tackle	Missouri
John Grabowski	Offensive tackle	Eastern Michigan
Robert Grant	Safety	Hawaii
Gavin Hoffman	Quarterback	Penn
Harold Jackson	Fullback	Temple
Stephon Kelly	Safety	Winston-Salem State
Dwayne Levels	Linebacker	Oklahoma State
Kwazeon Leverette	Wide receiver	Syracuse
Darcey Levy	Wide receiver	Pittsburgh
Jason Murray	Fullback	Notre Dame
Reggie Myles	Defensive back	Alabama
Jermaine Petty	Linebacker	Arkansas
Pig Prather	Safety	Mississippi State
Tito Rodriguez	Linebacker	UCF
Tierre Sams	Cornerback	Fresno State
Trent Sansbury	Tight end	Furman
Michael Slater	Wide receiver	Murray State
Thatcher Szalay	Center	Montana

== Personnel ==
2002 Cincinnati Bengals staff
Front office: President – Mike Brown; Head coaches: Head coach – Dick LeBeau; Offensive coaches: Offensive coordinator – Bob Bratkowski; Quarterbacks – Ken Anderson; Running backs – Jim Anderson; Wide receivers – Steve Mooshagian; Tight ends – John Garrett; Offensive line – Paul Alexander; Offensive assistant – Bob Surace	Defensive coaches: Defensive coordinator/linebackers – Mark Duffner; Defensive line – Tim Krumrie; Cornerbacks – Kevin Coyle; Safeties – Darren Perry; Defensive assistant – Louie Cioffi; Special teams coaches: Special teams – Al Roberts; Strength and conditioning: Strength and conditioning – Kim Wood; Strength and conditioning assistant – Rodney Holman

== Roster ==
2002 Cincinnati Bengals roster
Quarterbacks (QB): 12 Gus Frerotte; 7 Joe Germaine; 3 Jon Kitna; 11 Akili Smith; Running backs (RB): 36 Brandon Bennett KR; 28 Corey Dillon; 32 Rudi Johnson KR; 30 Nick Luchey FB; 41 Lorenzo Neal FB; Wide receivers (WR): 81 Ron Dugans; 83 Danny Farmer; 84 T. J. Houshmandzadeh PR; 85 Chad Johnson; 80 Peter Warrick; Tight ends (TE): 87 Chris Edmonds; 89 Matt Schobel; 86 Tony Stewart	Offensive linemen (OL): 71 Willie Anderson T; 74 Rich Braham C; 60 Reggie Coleman T; 63 Mike Goff G; 62 Brock Gutierrez C; 76 Levi Jones T; 77 Victor Leyva G/T; 72 Matt O'Dwyer G; 79 Scott Rehberg G; 66 Thatcher Szalay G; Defensive linemen (DL): 96 Vaughn Booker DE; 92 Eric Ogbogu DE; 90 Justin Smith DE; 68 Ron Smith DT; 70 Glen Steele DT; 97 Bernard Whittington DE; 94 Tony Williams DT; 55 Reinard Wilson DE	Linebackers (LB): 98 Canute Curtis OLB; 50 Riall Johnson OLB; 52 Dwayne Levels OLB; 57 Adrian Ross OLB; 56 Brian Simmons MLB; 51 Takeo Spikes OLB; Defensive backs (DB): 33 JoJuan Armour SS; 21 Jeff Burris CB; 42 Lavar Glover CB; 27 Artrell Hawkins CB; 34 Kevin Kaesviharn CB; 44 Marquand Manuel SS; 37 Reggie Myles CB; 31 Jason Perry FS; Special teams (ST): 10 Travis Dorsch K/P; 8 Nick Harris P; 5 Neil Rackers K; 48 Brad St. Louis LS	Practice squad: 93 Mario Monds DT; 46 Tito Rodriguez LB; 43 Derek Smith TE; Reserve: 88 Sean Brewer TE (IR); 95 Steve Foley LB (IR); 99 Oliver Gibson DT (IR); 26 Cory Hall S (IR); 25 Ligarius Jennings CB (IR); 45 Stephon Kelly S (IR); 20 Mark Roman S (IR); 59 Armegis Spearman LB (IR); 75 Jamain Stephens T (IR); 24 Lamont Thompson S (IR); 73 Richmond Webb T (IR); Rookies in italics 53 active, 11 reserve, 3 practice squad

== Regular season ==
=== Schedule ===
Week	Date	Opponent	Result	Record	Venue	Attendance
1	September 8	San Diego Chargers	**L** 6–34	0–1	Paul Brown Stadium	53,705
2	September 15	at **Cleveland Browns**	**L** 7–20	0–2	Cleveland Browns Stadium	73,358
3	September 22	at Atlanta Falcons	**L** 3–30	0–3	Georgia Dome	68,129
4	September 29	Tampa Bay Buccaneers	**L** 7–35	0–4	Paul Brown Stadium	57,234
5	October 6	at Indianapolis Colts	**L** 21–28	0–5	RCA Dome	56,570
6	October 13	**Pittsburgh Steelers**	**L** 7–34	0–6	Paul Brown Stadium	63,900
7	Bye					
8	October 27	Tennessee Titans	**L** 24–30	0–7	Paul Brown Stadium	52,822
9	November 3	at Houston Texans	**W** 38–3	1–7	Reliant Stadium	69,827
10	November 10	at **Baltimore Ravens**	**L** 27–38	1–8	Ravens Stadium	69,024
11	November 17	**Cleveland Browns**	**L** 20–27	1–9	Paul Brown Stadium	64,060
12	November 24	at **Pittsburgh Steelers**	**L** 21–29	1–10	Heinz Field	60,473
13	December 1	**Baltimore Ravens**	**L** 23–27	1–11	Paul Brown Stadium	44,878
14	December 8	at Carolina Panthers	**L** 31–52	1–12	Ericsson Stadium	66,799
15	December 15	Jacksonville Jaguars	**L** 15–29	1–13	Paul Brown Stadium	42,092
16	December 22	New Orleans Saints	**W** 20–13	2–13	Paul Brown Stadium	43,544
17	December 29	at Buffalo Bills	**L** 9–27	2–14	Ralph Wilson Stadium	47,850

Note: Intra-divisional opponents are in bold text

=== Game summaries ===
==== Week 1: vs. San Diego Chargers ====
Week 1: San Diego Chargers (0–0) at Cincinnati Bengals (0–0) – Game summary

Quarter	1	2	3	4	Total
**Chargers**	10	10	7	7	**34**
Bengals	0	0	3	3	**6**

at Paul Brown Stadium, Cincinnati, Ohio

- Date: September 9
- Game time: 1:00 p.m. EDT
- Game weather: 90 °F (32 °C), relative humidity 60%, wind 7 mph
- Game attendance: 53,705
- Referee: Johnny Grier
- TV announcers (CBS): Don Criqui and Solomon Wilcots
- Box score, Game Book

Game information

**First quarter**

- SDG – Steve Christie 28-yard field goal, 8:48. Chargers 3–0. **Drive: 11 plays, 66 yards, 6:12.**
- SDG – Josh Norman 1-yard pass from Drew Brees (Steve Christie kick), 1:18. Chargers 10–0. **Drive: 6 plays, 14 yards, 3:13.**

**Second quarter**

- SDG – Steve Christie 27-yard field goal, 13:14. Chargers 13–0. **Drive: 6 plays, 58 yards, 2:03.**
- SDG – LaDainian Tomlinson 1-yard run (Steve Christie kick), 0:19. Chargers 20–0. **Drive: 15 plays, 95 yards, 7:55.**

**Third quarter**

- CIN – Neil Rackers 21-yard field goal, 11:17. Chargers 20–3. **Drive: 9 plays, 77 yards, 3:43.**
- SDG – Curtis Conway 9-yard pass from Drew Brees (Steve Christie kick), 8:42. Chargers 27–3. **Drive: 5 plays, 64 yards, 2:35.**

**Fourth quarter**

- SDG – Terrell Fletcher 1-yard run (Steve Christie kick), 9:14. Chargers 34–3. **Drive: 12 plays, 78 yards, 8:31.**
- CIN – Neil Rackers 54-yard field goal, 5:43. Chargers 34–6. **Drive: 11 plays, 41 yards, 3:31.**

**Top passers**

- SDG – Drew Brees – 15/19, 160 yards, 2 TD
- CIN – Gus Frerotte – 18/31, 198 yards, INT

**Top rushers**

- SDG – LaDainian Tomlinson – 21 rushes, 114 yards, TD
- CIN – Gus Frerotte – 2 rushes, 14 yards

**Top receivers**

- SDG – LaDainian Tomlinson – 3 receptions, 45 yards
  SDG – Tim Dwight – 3 receptions, 45 yards
- CIN – Danny Farmer – 2 receptions, 54 yards

==== Week 3: at Atlanta Falcons ====
Week 3: Cincinnati Bengals at Atlanta Falcons

Quarter	1	2	3	4	Total
Bengals	0	3	0	0	**3**
**Falcons**	13	7	7	3	**30**

at Georgia Dome, Atlanta, Georgia

- Date: September 22, 2002
- Game time: 8:30 pm
- Game weather: None (indoor stadium)
- Game attendance: 68,129
- Referee: Terry McAulay (77)
- TV announcers (ESPN): Mike Patrick, Paul Maguire, Joe Theismann, and Suzy Kolber
- Recap, Game Book

Game information

**First quarter**

- ATL – Jay Feely 44-yard field goal, 10:01. Falcons 3–0. **Drive: 7 plays, 46 yards, 4:69.**
- ATL – Jay Feely 26-yard field goal, 7:19. Falcons 6–0. **Drive: 4 plays, 7 yards, 1:48.**
- ATL – Brian Finneran 20-yard pass from Michael Vick (Jay Feely kick), 1:57. Falcons 13–0. **Drive: 7 plays, 55 yards, 3:28.**

**Second quarter**

- ATL – Brian Finneran 13-yard pass from Michael Vick (Jay Feely kick), 4:56. Falcons 20–0. **Drive: 4 plays, 24 yards, 1:42.**
- CIN – Neil Rackers 24-yard field goal, 0:03. Falcons 20–3. **Drive: 14 plays, 53 yards, 4:53.**

**Third quarter**

- ATL – Warrick Dunn 4-yard run (Jay Feely kick), 5:07. Falcons 27–3. **Drive: 11 plays, 74 yards, 7:00.**

**Fourth quarter**

- ATL – Jay Feely 34-yard field goal, 7:30. Falcons 30–3. **Drive: 10 plays, 46 yards, 5:39.**

**Top passers**

- CIN – Jon Kitna – 18/35, 136 yards, INT
- ATL – Michael Vick – 16/26, 174 yards, 2 TD

**Top rushers**

- CIN – Corey Dillon – 18 rushes, 66 yards
- ATL – TJ Duckett – 18 rushes, 67 yards

**Top receivers**

- CIN – Peter Warrick – 4 receptions, 34 yards
- ATL – Brian Finneran – 6 receptions, 77 yards, 2 TD

==== Week 17: at Buffalo Bills ====
Week 17: Cincinnati Bengals (2–13) at Buffalo Bills (7–8) – Game summary

Quarter	1	2	3	4	Total
Bengals	0	3	0	6	**9**
**Bills**	6	14	7	0	**27**

at Ralph Wilson Stadium, Orchard Park, New York

- Date: December 29, 2002
- Game time: 1:00 pm
- Game weather: Cloudy, 35 °F (2 °C)
- Game attendance: 47,850
- Referee: Mike Carey (94)
- TV announcers (CBS): Don Criqui, Steve Tasker
- Recap, Game Book

Game information

**First quarter**

- BUF – Mike Hollis 32-yard field goal, 8:36. Bills 3-0. **Drive: 11 plays, 80 yards, 5:15.**
- BUF – Mike Hollis 25-yard field goal, 1:12. Bills 6-0. **Drive: 4 plays, 4, yards, 1:32.**

**Second quarter**

- BUF – Drew Bledsoe 7-yard run (Mike Hollis kick), 10:25. Bills 13-0. **Drive: 9 plays, 55 yards, 4:15.**
- BUF – Eric Moulds 2-yard pass from Drew Bledsoe (Mike Hollis kick), 2:41. Bills 20-0. **Drive: 10 plays, 54 yards, 5:12.**
- CIN – Neil Rackers 19-yard field goal, 0:24. Bills 20-3. **Drive: 11 plays, 78 yards, 2:17.**

**Third quarter**

- BUF – Larry Centers 4-yard run (Mike Hollis kick), 1:37. Bills 27-3. **Drive: 9 plays, 58 yards, 4:11.**

**Fourth quarter**

- CIN – Jon Kitna 6-yard run (run failed), 8:05. Bills 27-9. **Drive: 7 plays, 71 yards, 2:49.**

**Top passers**

- CIN – Jon Kitna – 19/35, 241 yards, 2 INT
- BUF – Drew Bledsoe – 23/31, 231 yards, TD

**Top rushers**

- CIN – Corey Dillon – 13 rushes, 53 yards
- BUF – Travis Henry – 30 rushes, 80 yards

**Top receivers**

- CIN – Chad Johnson – 6 receptions, 123 yards
- BUF – Eric Moulds – 9 receptions, 75 yards, TD

With the loss, the Bengals ended their season with a franchise worst 2–14 record (eventually tied by the 2019 Bengals), and they clinched the No. 1 pick in the 2003 NFL draft. Head coach Dick LeBeau was fired after the game.

=== Standings ===
==== Division ====
AFC North
	W	L	T	PCT	DIV	CONF	PF	PA	STK
^{(3)} Pittsburgh Steelers	10	5	1	.656	6–0	8–4	390	345	W3
^{(6)} Cleveland Browns	9	7	0	.563	3–3	7–5	344	320	W2
Baltimore Ravens	7	9	0	.438	3–3	7–5	316	354	L2
Cincinnati Bengals	2	14	0	.125	0–6	1–11	279	456	L1

==== Conference ====
AFC
#	Team	Division	W	L	T	PCT	DIV	CONF	SOS	SOV
**Division leaders**
1 (Note: Oakland finished ahead of Tennessee based on head-to-head victory.)	Oakland Raiders	West	11	5	0	.688	4–2	9–3	.529	.531
2	Tennessee Titans	South	11	5	0	.688	6–0	9–3	.479	.474
3	Pittsburgh Steelers	North	10	5	1	.656	6–0	8–4	.486	.451
4 (Note: N.Y. Jets finished ahead of New England based on win percentage in common games (8–4 to 7–5) after both finished ahead of Miami based on division record (4–2 to 2–4).)	New York Jets	East	9	7	0	.563	4–2	6–6	.500	.500
**Wild Cards**
5	Indianapolis Colts	South	10	6	0	.625	4–2	8–4	.479	.400
6 (Note: Cleveland finished ahead of Denver and New England based on conference record (7–5 vs 5–7/6–6))	Cleveland Browns	North	9	7	0	.563	3–3	7–5	.486	.413
**Did not qualify for the postseason**
7 (Note: Denver finished ahead of New England based on head-to-head victory.)	Denver Broncos	West	9	7	0	.563	3–3	5–7	.527	.486
8 (Note: New England finished ahead of Miami based on division record (4–2 to 2–4).)	New England Patriots	East	9	7	0	.563	4–2	6–6	.525	.455
9	Miami Dolphins	East	9	7	0	.563	2–4	7–5	.508	.486
10 (Note: Buffalo finished ahead of San Diego based on head-to-head victory.)	Buffalo Bills	East	8	8	0	.500	2–4	5–7	.473	.352
11 (Note: San Diego finished ahead of Kansas City based on division record (3–3 to 2–4).)	San Diego Chargers	West	8	8	0	.500	3–3	6–6	.492	.453
12	Kansas City Chiefs	West	8	8	0	.500	2–4	6–6	.527	.516
13	Baltimore Ravens	North	7	9	0	.438	3–3	7–5	.506	.384
14	Jacksonville Jaguars	South	6	10	0	.375	1–5	4–8	.506	.438
15	Houston Texans	South	4	12	0	.250	1–5	2–10	.518	.492
16	Cincinnati Bengals	North	2	14	0	.125	0–6	1–11	.537	.406
**Tiebreakers** (Note: When breaking ties for three or more teams under the NFL's rules, they are first broken within divisions, then comparing only the highest ranked remaining team from each division.)

== Team leaders ==
=== Passing ===
Player	Att	Comp	Yds	TD	INT	Rating
Jon Kitna	473	294	3178	16	16	79.1

=== Rushing ===
Player	Att	Yds	YPC	Long	TD
Corey Dillon	314	1311	4.2	67	7

=== Receiving ===
Player	Rec	Yds	Avg	Long	TD
Chad Johnson	69	1166	16.9	72	5
Peter Warrick	53	606	11.4	37	6

=== Defensive ===
Player	Tackles	Sacks	INTs	FF	FR
Takeo Spikes	171	1.5	0	2	4
Justin Smith	67	6.5	0	1	0
Artrell Hawkins	92	2.0	2	1	2
Kevin Kaesviharn	62	0.0	2	1	0

=== Kicking and punting ===
Player	FGA	FGM	FG%	XPA	XPM	XP%	Points
Neil Rackers	18	15	83.3%	32	30	93.8%	75

Player	Punts	Yards	Long	Blkd	Avg.
Nick Harris	65	2608	57	1	40.1

=== Special teams ===
Player	KR	KRYards	KRAvg	KRLong	KRTD	PR	PRYards	PRAvg	PRLong	PRTD
Brandon Bennett	49	1231	25.1	94	0	0	0	0.0	0	0
T. J. Houshmandzadeh	13	288	22.2	44	0	24	117	4.9	34	0

== Awards and records ==
=== Pro Bowl selections ===
- Lorenzo Neal FB, AFC Pro Bowl selection

=== Milestones ===
- Corey Dillon, 6th 1,000 yard rushing (1,311 yards) season
