= 2001 Cincinnati Bengals season =

NFL team season

- Head coach: Dick LeBeau
- Home stadium: Paul Brown Stadium

Results
- Record: 6–10
- Division place: 6th AFC Central
- Playoffs: Did not qualify
- Pro Bowlers: RB Corey Dillon

The 2001 Cincinnati Bengals season was the franchise’s 34th year in professional football and its 32nd with the National Football League. The Bengals abandoned their plans for developing quarterback Akili Smith as their starter by acquiring Jon Kitna from the Seattle Seahawks. The Bengals would win their first two games with Kitna behind center, and sat at 4–3 through the first seven games of the season. However, the Bengals would struggle again, losing their next seven games as Kitna struggled with inconsistency, throwing 22 interceptions while throwing only 12 touchdown passes. The Bengals would win their final two games to close the season with a 6–10 record, their eleventh consecutive season without a winning record. Despite the team’s struggles, All-Pro running back Corey Dillon had another stellar year, rushing for 1,315 yards.

In 2001 players such as Justin Smith, Chad Johnson, Rudi Johnson, and T. J. Houshmandzadeh were drafted, all of whom would be important to Cincinnati in later years. One positive for the Bengals that year was that they defeated the eventual Super Bowl champion New England Patriots in the season opener.

== Offseason ==
Additions	Subtractions
QB Jon Kitna (Seahawks)	T Rod Jones (Rams)
DT Tony Williams (Vikings)	DT Tom Barndt (Jets)
DE Bernard Whittington (Colts)	DE Michael Bankston (Redskins)
FB Lorenzo Neal (Titans)	
T Richmond Webb (Dolphins)	

=== NFL draft ===
2001 Cincinnati Bengals draft
Round	Pick	Player	Position	College	Notes
1	4	Justin Smith *	Defensive end	Missouri	
2	36	Chad Johnson *	Wide receiver	Oregon State	
3	66	Sean Brewer	Tight end	San Jose State	
4	100	Rudi Johnson *	Running back	Auburn	
5	135	Victor Leyva	Guard	Arizona State	
6	168	Riall Johnson	Linebacker	Stanford	
7	204	T. J. Houshmandzadeh *	Wide receiver	Oregon State	
Made roster * Made at least one Pro Bowl during career

=== Undrafted free agents ===
2001 undrafted free agents of note
Player	Position	College
Jeff Boyle	Defensive tackle	Wyoming
Kenny Bryant	Cornerback	Jackson State
Jeff Chase	Guard	Texas A&M–Kingsville
Chris Edmonds	Linebacker	West Virginia
Rashad Harris	Linebacker	Louisville
Jared Lee	Safety	BYU
Calvin Lewis	Defensive tackle	Memphis
Freddie Moore	Tackle	Florida A&M
Ramondo North	Wide receiver	North Carolina A&T
Duke Pettijohn	Linebacker	Syracuse
Dave Puloka	Linebacker	Holy Cross
Chris Rosier	Wide receiver	William & Mary
Kamal Shakir	Linebacker	Memphis

== Personnel ==
2001 Cincinnati Bengals staff
Front office: President – Mike Brown; Executive vice president – Katie Blackburn; Vice president – John Sawyer; Senior vice president of player personnel – Pete Brown; Vice president of player personnel – Paul H. Brown; Directors of pro/college personnel – Jim Lippincott, Duke Tobin; Head coaches: Head coach – Dick LeBeau; Offensive coaches: Offensive coordinator – Bob Bratkowski; Quarterbacks – Ken Anderson; Running backs – Jim Anderson; Wide receivers – Steve Mooshagian; Tight ends – Frank Verducci; Offensive line – Paul Alexander; Offensive assistant – John Garrett	Defensive coaches: Defensive coordinator/linebackers – Mark Duffner; Defensive line – Tim Krumrie; Cornerbacks – Kevin Coyle; Safeties – Ray Horton; Defensive assistant – Louie Cioffi; Special teams coaches: Special teams – Al Roberts; Strength and conditioning: Strength and conditioning – Kim Wood; Strength and conditioning assistant – Rodney Holman

== Roster ==
2001 Cincinnati Bengals roster
Quarterbacks (QB): 4 Scott Covington; 3 Jon Kitna; 19 Scott Mitchell; Running backs (RB): 36 Brandon Bennett; 28 Corey Dillon; 32 Rudi Johnson; 29 Curtis Keaton; 30 Nick Williams; 41 Lorenzo Neal FB; Wide receivers (WR): 81 Ron Dugans; 83 Danny Farmer; 84 T. J. Houshmandzadeh; 85 Chad Johnson; 86 Darnay Scott; 80 Peter Warrick; Tight ends (TE): 87 Chris Edmonds; 43 Kirk McMullen	Offensive linemen (OL): 71 Willie Anderson T; 74 Rich Braham C; 63 Mike Goff G; 62 Brock Gutierrez C; 65 John Jackson T; 77 Victor Leyva G/T; 72 Matt O'Dwyer G; 79 Scott Rehberg G; 75 Jamain Stephens T; 73 Richmond Webb T; Defensive linemen (DL): 96 Vaughn Booker DE; 99 Oliver Gibson DT; 58 Jevon Langford DE; 93 Mario Monds DT; 90 Justin Smith DE; 70 Glen Steele DT; 97 Bernard Whittington DE; 94 Tony Williams DT; 55 Reinard Wilson DE	Linebackers (LB): 98 Canute Curtis OLB; 95 Steve Foley OLB; 50 Riall Johnson OLB; 57 Adrian Ross MLB; 56 Brian Simmons MLB; 51 Takeo Spikes OLB; Defensive backs (DB): 33 JoJuan Armour SS; 23 Robert Bean CB; 42 Chris Carter FS; 26 Cory Hall SS; 27 Artrell Hawkins CB; 25 Ligarius Jennings CB; 34 Kevin Kaesviharn CB; 31 Darryl Williams FS; Special teams (ST): 91 Randy Chevrier LS; 8 Nick Harris P; 5 Neil Rackers K	Practice squad: 67 Jeff Boyle DT (IR); 10 Khori Ivy WR; 49 Josh Keur TE; 64 Ray Redziniak C; 16 Kevin Thompson QB; Reserve: 88 Sean Brewer TE (IR); 22 Rodney Heath CB (IR); 82 Tony McGee TE (IR); 20 Mark Roman CB (IR); 11 Akili Smith QB (IR); 59 Armegis Spearman LB (IR); 48 Brad St. Louis LS (IR); Rookies in italics 53 active, 8 reserve, 4 practice squad

== Regular season ==
=== Schedule ===
Week	Date	Opponent	Result	Record	Venue	Attendance
1	September 9	New England Patriots	**W** 23–17	1–0	Paul Brown Stadium	51,521
2	September 23	**Baltimore Ravens**	**W** 21–10	2–0	Paul Brown Stadium	51,121
3	September 30	at San Diego Chargers	**L** 14–28	2–1	Qualcomm Stadium	56,048
4	October 7	at **Pittsburgh Steelers**	**L** 7–16	2–2	Heinz Field	62,335
5	October 14	**Cleveland Browns**	**W** 24–14	3–2	Paul Brown Stadium	64,217
6	October 21	Chicago Bears	**L** 0–24	3–3	Paul Brown Stadium	63,408
7	October 28	at Detroit Lions	**W** 31–27	4–3	Pontiac Silverdome	69,343
8	Bye					
9	November 11	at **Jacksonville Jaguars**	**L** 13–30	4–4	Alltel Stadium	57,161
10	November 18	**Tennessee Titans**	**L** 7–20	4–5	Paul Brown Stadium	63,865
11	November 25	at **Cleveland Browns**	**L** 0–18	4–6	Cleveland Browns Stadium	72,918
12	December 2	Tampa Bay Buccaneers	**L** 13–16 (OT)	4–7	Paul Brown Stadium	52,135
13	December 9	**Jacksonville Jaguars**	**L** 10–14	4–8	Paul Brown Stadium	44,920
14	December 16	at New York Jets	**L** 14–15	4–9	Giants Stadium	77,745
15	December 23	at **Baltimore Ravens**	**L** 0–16	4–10	PSINet Stadium	68,987
16	December 30	**Pittsburgh Steelers**	**W** 26–23 (OT)	5–10	Paul Brown Stadium	63,751
17	January 6	at **Tennessee Titans**	**W** 23–21	6–10	Adelphia Coliseum	68,798
Note: Intra-division opponents are in **bold** text.

== Game summaries ==
=== Week 1: vs. New England Patriots ===
Week 1: New England Patriots at Cincinnati Bengals – Game summary

Quarter	1	2	3	4	Total
Patriots	0	10	0	7	17
Bengals	0	10	13	0	23

at Paul Brown Stadium, Cincinnati, Ohio

- Date: September 9
- Game time: 1:00 p.m. EDT
- Game weather: Cloudy, 79 °F (26 °C)
- Game attendance: 51,521
- Referee: John Smith
- TV announcers (CBS): Gus Johnson, Brent Jones, Sam Wyche
- Box score

Game information

First quarter

- No scoring plays

Second quarter

- NE – Troy Brown 14-yard pass from Drew Bledsoe (Adam Vinatieri kick), 14:55. Patriots 7–0. Drive: 11 plays, 68 yards, 6:44.
- CIN – Neil Rackers 36-yard field foal, 11:22. Patriots 7–3. Drive: 8 plays, 12 yards, 3:33.
- NE – Adam Vinatieri 39-yard field goal, 6:04. Patriots 10–3. Drive: 9 plays, 59 yards, 5:18.
- CIN – Corey Dillon 5-yard run (Neil Rackers kick), 2:16. Tied 10–10. Drive: 7 plays, 71 yards, 3:48.

Third quarter

- CIN – Neil Rackers 47-yard field goal, 12:05. Bengals 13–10. Drive: 5 plays, 42 yards, 1:49.
- CIN – Neil Rackers 33-yard field goal, 6:01. Bengals 16–10. Drive: 9 plays, 44 yards, 4:23.
- CIN – Tony McGee 25-yard pass from Jon Kitna (Neil Rackers kick), 0:06. Bengals 23–10. Drive: 7 plays, 70 yards, 3:18.

Fourth quarter

- NE – Jermaine Wiggins 8-yard pass from Drew Bledsoe (Adam Vinatieri kick), 5:29. Bengals 23–17. Drive: 11 plays, 94 yards, 3:48.

Top passers

- NE – Drew Bledsoe – 22/38, 241 yards, 2 TD
- CIN – Jon Kitna – 18/27, 204 yards, TD

Top rushers

- NE – Antowain Smith – 11 rushes, 33 yards
- CIN – Corey Dillon – 24 rushes, 104 yards, TD

Top receivers

- NE – Troy Brown – 7 receptions, 106 yards, TD
- CIN – Darnay Scott – 5 receptions, 104 yards

=== Week 2: vs. Baltimore Ravens ===
Week 2: Baltimore Ravens at Cincinnati Bengals – Game summary

Quarter	1	2	3	4	Total
Ravens	3	0	0	7	10
Bengals	0	0	14	7	21

at Paul Brown Stadium, Cincinnati, Ohio

- Date: September 23
- Game time: 1:00 p.m. EDT
- Game weather: Partly cloudy, 73 °F (23 °C)
- Game attendance: 51,121
- Referee: Ed Hochuli
- TV announcers (CBS): Ian Eagle, Solomon Wilcots
- Box score

Game information

First quarter

- BAL – Matt Stover 38-yard field goal, 4:22. Ravens 3–0. Drive: 8 plays, 37 yards, 2:58.

Second quarter

- No scoring plays

Third quarter

- CIN – Corey Dillon 1-yard pass from Jon Kitna (Neil Rackers kick), 11:38. Bengals 7–3. Drive: 6 plays, 18 yards, 3:09.
- CIN – Jon Kitna 2-yard run (Neil Rackers kick), 8:10. Bengals 14–3. Drive: 6 plays, 33 yards, 2:58.

Fourth quarter

- BAL – Patrick Johnson 2-yard pass from Elvis Grbac (Matt Stover kick), 13:40. Bengals 14–10. Drive: 4 plays, 17 yards, 1:28.
- CIN – Takeo Spikes 66-yard interception return (Neil Rackers kick), 6:04. Bengals 21–10.

Top passers

- BAL – Elvis Grbac – 33/63, 326 yards, TD, 3 INT
- CIN – Jon Kitna – 19/30, 154 yards, TD

Top rushers

- BAL – Terry Allen – 17 rushes, 61 yards
- CIN – Corey Dillon – 18 rushes, 57 yards

Top receivers

- BAL – Shannon Sharpe – 8 receptions, 84 yards
- CIN – Darnay Scott – 5 receptions, 82 yards

=== Week 3: at San Diego Chargers ===
Week 3: Cincinnati Bengals at San Diego Chargers – Game summary

Quarter	1	2	3	4	Total
Bengals	0	7	0	7	14
Chargers	0	7	14	7	28

at Qualcomm Stadium, San Diego, California

- Date: September 30
- Game time: 4:15 p.m. EDT/1:15 PDT
- Game weather: Clear and sunny, 78 °F (26 °C)
- Game attendance: 56,048
- Referee: Dick Hantak
- TV announcers (CBS): Bill Macatee, Trevor Matich, and Scott Kaplan
- Box score

=== Week 4: at Pittsburgh Steelers ===
Week 4: Cincinnati Bengals at Pittsburgh Steelers – Game summary

Quarter	1	2	3	4	Total
Bengals	0	0	0	7	7
Steelers	0	10	0	6	16

at Heinz Field, Pittsburgh, Pennsylvania

- Date: October 7
- Game time: 1:00 p.m. EDT
- Game weather: Party cloudy, 46 °F (8 °C)
- Game attendance: 62,335
- Referee: Larry Nemmers
- TV announcers (CBS): Bill Macatee and Trevor Matich
- Box score

=== Week 5: vs. Cleveland Browns ===
Week 5: Cleveland Browns at Cincinnati Bengals – Game summary

Quarter	1	2	3	4	Total
Browns	7	0	0	7	14
Bengals	3	0	10	11	24

at Paul Brown Stadium, Cincinnati, Ohio

- Date: October 14
- Game time: 1:00 p.m. EDT
- Game weather: Cloudy, 57 °F (14 °C)
- Game attendance: 64,217
- Referee: Mike Carey
- TV announcers (CBS): Don Criqui, Steve Tasker
- Box score

=== Week 6: vs. Chicago Bears ===
Week 6: Chicago Bears at Cincinnati Bengals – Game summary

Quarter	1	2	3	4	Total
Bears	3	7	7	7	24
Bengals	0	0	0	0	0

at Paul Brown Stadium, Cincinnati, Ohio

- Date: October 21
- Game time: 1:00 p.m. EDT
- Game weather: Partly cloudy, 68 °F (20 °C)
- Game attendance: 63,408
- Referee: Bernie Kukar
- TV announcers (Fox): Curt Menefee, Brian Baldinger, and Dan Jiggetts
- Box score

Game information

First quarter

- CHI – Paul Edinger 48-yard field goal, 4:29. Bears 3–0. Drive: 4 plays, 2 yards, 0:53.

Second quarter

- CHI – Fred Baxter 1-yard pass from Jim Miller (Paul Edinger kick), 12:51. Bears 10–0. Drive: 3 plays, 51 yards, 1:28.

Third quarter

- CHI – Marty Booker 13-yard pass from Jim Miller (Paul Edinger kick), 3:25. Bears 17–0. Drive: 6 plays, 67 yards, 3:22.

Fourth quarter

- CHI – Anthony Thomas 23-yard run (Paul Edinger kick), 9:05. Bears 24–0. Drive: 9 plays, 71 yards, 5:09.

Top passers

- CHI – Jim Miller – 23/30, 232 yards, 2 TD
- CIN – Jon Kitna – 19/46, 244 yards, INT

Top rushers

- CHI – Anthony Thomas – 22 rushes, 188 yards, TD
- CIN – Corey Dillon – 16 rushes, 30 yards

Top receivers

- CHI – David Terrell – 7 receptions, 91 yards
- CIN – Peter Warrick – 8 receptions, 84 yards

=== Week 7: at Detroit Lions ===
Week 7: Cincinnati Bengals at Detroit Lions – Game summary

Quarter	1	2	3	4	Total
Bengals	7	14	3	7	31
Lions	3	10	14	0	27

at Pontiac Silverdome, Detroit, Michigan

- Date: October 28
- Game time: 1:00 p.m. EST
- Game weather: None (played indoors)
- Game attendance: 69,343
- Referee: Johnny Grier
- TV announcers (CBS): Gus Johnson, Brent Jones
- Box score

== Standings ==
AFC Central
	W	L	T	PCT	PF	PA	STK
^{(1)} Pittsburgh Steelers	13	3	0	.813	352	212	W1
^{(5)} Baltimore Ravens	10	6	0	.625	303	265	W1
Cleveland Browns	7	9	0	.438	285	319	L1
Tennessee Titans	7	9	0	.438	336	388	L2
Jacksonville Jaguars	6	10	0	.375	294	286	L2
Cincinnati Bengals	6	10	0	.375	226	309	W2

== Team leaders ==
=== Passing ===
Player	Att	Comp	Yds	TD	INT	Rating
Jon Kitna	581	313	3216	12	22	61.1

=== Rushing ===
Player	Att	Yds	YPC	Long	TD
Corey Dillon	340	1315	3.9	96	10

=== Receiving ===
Player	Rec	Yds	Avg	Long	TD
Peter Warrick	70	667	9.5	33	1
Darnay Scott	57	819	14.4	49	2
Corey Dillon	34	228	6.7	17	3

=== Defensive ===
Player	Tackles	Sacks	INTs	FF	FR
Takeo Spikes	109	6.0	1	1	0
Reinard Wilson	37	9.0	0	1	2
Artrell Hawkins	59	0.0	3	2	1
Kevin Kaesviharn	25	0.0	3	0	0

=== Kicking and punting ===
Player	FGA	FGM	FG%	XPA	XPM	XP%	Points
Neil Rackers	28	17	60.7%	24	23	95.8%	74

Player	Punts	Yards	Long	Blkd	Avg.
Nick Harris	84	3372	57	1	40.1

=== Special teams ===
Player	KR	KRYards	KRAvg	KRLong	KRTD	PR	PRYards	PRAvg	PRLong	PRTD
Curtis Keaton	42	891	21.2	64	0	0	0	0.0	0	0
Peter Warrick	0	0	0.0	0	0	18	116	6.4	31	0
T. J. Houshmandzadeh	10	185	18.5	23	0	12	163	13.6	86	0

== Awards and records ==
- Corey Dillon, 5th 1,000 yard rushing season
