= Spearman (disambiguation) =

A spearman is a fighter armed with a spear.

== People ==
- Spearman (surname)
- Spearman baronets, a title in the Baronetage of the United Kingdom

== Places ==
- Spearman, Texas
  - Spearman High School
  - Spearman Independent School District

== Other ==
- The Spearman, an alternate title for the Shaw Brothers film Flag of Iron
- Spearman–Brown prediction formula, a formula relating psychometric reliability
- Spearman's rank correlation coefficient, a non-parametric test statistic

== See also ==
- James Spearman Winter (1845–1911), former Premier of Newfoundland
- Charles Spearman Armstrong (1847–1924), tea and cinchona planter in British Ceylon
- Spear (disambiguation)
- Man (disambiguation)
