= Spearman (surname) =

Spearman is a surname. Notable people with the surname include:

- Alexander Spearman (1901–1982), British Member of Parliament
- Sir Alexander Young Spearman, 1st Baronet (1793–1874), British civil servant
- Armegis Spearman (born 1978), American football linebacker
- Charles Spearman (1863–1945)), English psychologist and statistician
- Clyde Spearman (fl. 1932–1946), American baseball player
- Craig Spearman (born 1972), New Zealand cricketer
- Diana Spearman (1905–1991), British writer and political activist
- Doug Spearman (born 1962), American actor
- Frank H. Spearman (1859–1937), American author known for his works on railroads
- Glenn Spearman (1947–1998), American saxophonist
- John Spearman (1824 – after 1901), American iron manufacturer
- Pat Spearman (born 1955), American politician
- Thomas David Spearman (born 1937), Irish mathematical physicist
