= Darnay Scott =

American football player (born 1972)

No. 86, 85
- Position: Wide receiver

Personal information
- Born: July 7, 1972 (age 54); St. Louis, Missouri, U.S.
- Listed height: 6 ft 1 in (1.85 m)
- Listed weight: 204 lb (93 kg)

Career information
- High school: Kearny (San Diego, California)
- College: San Diego State
- NFL draft: 1994: 2nd round, 30th overall pick

Career history
- Cincinnati Bengals (1994–2001); Jacksonville Jaguars (2002)*; Dallas Cowboys (2002)
- * Offseason or practice squad member only

Awards and highlights
- PFWA All-Rookie Team (1994); First-team All-WAC (1993)

Career NFL statistics
- Receptions: 408
- Receiving yards: 6,193
- Receiving touchdowns: 37
- Stats at Pro Football Reference

Darnay Scott (born July 7, 1972) is an American former professional football player who was a wide receiver in the National Football League (NFL) for the Cincinnati Bengals and Dallas Cowboys. He played college football for the San Diego State Aztecs.

== Early life ==
Scott attended Sumner High School, where he suffered from academic problems, got thrown off the junior varsity football team after a fight and was arrested, spending a week in a juvenile detention home. He transferred to Kearny High School after his sophomore season, becoming a two-way player as a wide receiver and defensive back.

As a senior, he registered 38 receptions for 790 yards, 19 touchdowns and 11 interceptions. Against Serra High School, he tallied 4 receptions for 141 yards, 3 touchdowns and returned an interception 70 yards for a touchdown. Against Ramona High School, he had 4 receptions for 144 yards, including an 85-yard touchdown.

He won the 100 metres (10.59 seconds) and 200 metres (21.27 seconds) during the CIF San Diego Section track and field championships. He also practiced basketball.

== College career ==
Scott accepted a football scholarship from San Diego State University, coming in the same recruiting class as future College Hall of Famer Marshall Faulk. As a true freshman in 1991, in his first college play and college game against Cal State Long Beach, he had a 19-yard touchdown reception, finishing with a team-high 88 receiving yards on 4 catches and 56 yards on two kickoff returns. He broke the NCAA single-game freshman receiving yardage record with 243 yards against Brigham Young University (11/16/91), including touchdown passes of 79 and 75 yards. He had one of the best freshman seasons in Aztecs history, even though he was a backup behind Patrick Rowe, posting 35 catches for 727 yards and 6 touchdowns.

As a sophomore in 1992, he became a starter after Rowe suffered a season ending knee injury during an exhibition game. He had the school’s fifth all-time best receiving performance against UTEP with 12 receptions for 274 yards (10/17/92) and also scored 3 touchdowns. He added another spectacular performance against Fresno State University with 217 yards (11/21/92). Other notable performances included 100 yard games against: New Mexico (100 yards - 10/3/92), BYU (105 - 9/10/92), and Hawaii (132 - 11/14/92). For the season Scott recorded 68 catches for 1,150 yards and 9 touchdowns, leading all SDSU WRs.

His success continued in 1993 as a junior, with performances of 139 (Minnesota - 9/25/93), 122 (New Mexico - 10/23/93), 148 (UCLA - 9/30/93) and 160 (Cal - 9/11/93) yards. Against Air Force he had his fourth career 200 yard game finishing with 11 catches for 217 yards and two touchdowns. Once again he led SDSU in receiving as he finished the season with 75 catches 1,262 yards and 10 touchdowns while recording six games of 100 or more yards receiving. In his stellar three-year career he caught 178 passes for 3,139 yards and 25 touchdowns. His twelve 100 yard and four 200 yard performances place him second in school history. At the time, he was one of only two Aztec wide receivers to record multiple 1,000 yard receiving seasons.

== Professional career ==
Pre-draft measurables
Height	Weight	Arm length	Hand span	40-yard dash	10-yard split	20-yard split
6 ft 1 in (1.85 m)	180 lb (82 kg)	32 1/2 in (0.83 m)	8 1/2 in (0.22 m)	4.55 s	1.57 s	2.66 s
All values from NFL Combine

=== Cincinnati Bengals ===
Scott was selected by the Cincinnati Bengals in the second round (30th pick overall) of the 1994 NFL draft. As a rookie, he made an immediate impact teaming with Carl Pickens to form one of the NFL's most potent wide receiver tandems. He caught touchdown passes of 55 and 67 yards against the two-time defending Super Bowl Champion Dallas Cowboys, finishing the contest with 4 receptions for 155 yards. The following week against the Seattle Seahawks he turned in yet another spectacular effort with 7 catches for 157 yards (including a 76-yard catch). He finished the season with 46 catches for 866 yards and 5 touchdowns while rushing for 106 yards in 10 attempts. He led all rookies with 866 receiving yards and the AFC in Yards Per Reception with 18.8.

His success continued in 1995 as he caught a career long 88-yard touchdown pass against Seattle Seahawks and the following week caught a 56-yard touchdown finishing the game with 4 catches for 125 yards in a loss against the Houston Oilers. In 1997 he caught the final pass thrown by Bengals QB Boomer Esiason: a 77-yard touchdown reception.

His best season as a professional came in 1999 season when he finished the season with 68 receptions for 1,022 yards and seven touchdowns.

In 2000, Pickens was released before the start of training camp and Scott was expected to start opposite rookie Peter Warrick, but suffered a fractured left tibia and fibula during a morning practice on August 1. It was considered a career-threatening injury and he was placed on the injured reserve list on August 2.

In 2001, he regained his starting position opposite Warrick, leading the team with 819 yards on 57 receptions and 2 touchdowns. In 2002, with the signing of free agent Michael Westbrook, he was released in a salary cap move on July 9. The additional cap space was expected to also help in the signing of linebackers Takeo Spikes and Brian Simmons to contract extensions.

Although he only had one 1,000 yard season in his career, Scott is considered one of the best wide receivers in Bengals history. He left as the fourth all-time leading receiver, recording 386 receptions for 5,975 yards, a 15.5-yard average and 35 touchdowns.

=== Jacksonville Jaguars ===
On July 22, 2002, he was signed as a free agent by the Jacksonville Jaguars, with the expectation of being Jimmy Smith’s backup. He was limited with a chronic shoulder injury during preseason and was released on September 1.

=== Dallas Cowboys ===
On September 9, 2002, he signed with the Dallas Cowboys, reuniting with offensive coordinator Bruce Coslet, who had also served that function previously with the Bengals. Scott split snaps with rookie Antonio Bryant, appearing in 15 games (one start), with 22 receptions for 218 yards and one touchdown. He wasn't re-signed after the season.

In nine years, he caught 408 passes for 6,193 yards and 37 touchdowns. He previously held the NFL record for most career touches without a fumble (445).

== NFL career statistics ==
Year	Team	GP	Rec	Yards	Avg	Lng	TD	FD	Fum	Lost
1994	CIN	16	46	866	18.8	76	5	31	0	0
1995	CIN	16	52	821	15.8	88	5	33	0	0
1996	CIN	16	58	833	14.4	50	5	40	0	0
1997	CIN	16	54	797	14.8	77	5	41	0	0
1998	CIN	13	51	817	16.0	70	7	34	0	0
1999	CIN	16	68	1,022	15.0	76	7	46	0	0
2001	CIN	16	57	819	14.4	49	2	40	0	0
2002	DAL	15	22	218	9.9	17	1	12	0	0
Career		124	408	6,193	15.2	88	37	277	0	0

== Personal life ==
Scott lives in San Diego. He is active in the community, coaching at Mesa College and mentoring students at Lincoln High School. He is the uncle of former NFL wide receiver Will Franklin.
