= Nick Harris (punter) =

American football player (born 1978)

No. 8, 2, 5
- Position: Punter

Personal information
- Born: July 23, 1978 (age 48); Avondale, Arizona, U.S.
- Listed height: 6 ft 2 in (1.88 m)
- Listed weight: 218 lb (99 kg)

Career information
- High school: Westview (Avondale)
- College: California
- NFL draft: 2001: 4th round, 120th overall pick

Career history
- Denver Broncos (2001)*; Cincinnati Bengals (2001−2003); Detroit Lions (2003−2010); Jacksonville Jaguars (2011); Carolina Panthers (2012)*; Detroit Lions (2012)
- * Offseason or practice squad member only

Awards and highlights
- Consensus All-American (2000); First-team All-Pac-10 (2000); Second-team All-Pac-10 (1999)

Career NFL statistics
- Punts: 943
- Punting average: 42.4
- Longest punt: 67
- Punts inside 20: 260
- Stats at Pro Football Reference

Nicholas John Harris (born July 23, 1978) is an American former professional football player who was a punter in the National Football League (NFL). He played college football for the California Golden Bears, setting the NCAA record for career punting yardage and earning consensus All-American honors. The Denver Broncos chose him in the fourth round of the 2001 NFL draft, and he has played professionally for the Cincinnati Bengals, Detroit Lions, Jacksonville Jaguars, and Carolina Panthers of the NFL.

== Early life and education ==
Harris was born in Avondale, Arizona. He attended Westview High School in Avondale, where he played for the Westview Knights high school football team. He earned National Coaches' Association All-America honors as a senior with 42.3-yard punting average. He Also earned prep all-state honors as a linebacker and saw action on offense as a receiver and a rusher. He was also an All-state prep soccer player as well.

Harris attended the University of California, Berkeley, where he played for the California Golden Bears from 1997 to 2000. He averaged 42.3 yards per punt, and his 13,621 total yards was an NCAA record. His 322 career punts is also an NCAA record. As a junior in 1999, he had a 44.7 yard average. As a senior in 2000, he was recognized as consensus first-team All-American.

Harris graduated with a bachelor's degree in American studies and later with a master's degree in education.

== Professional career ==
Pre-draft measurables
| Height | Weight |
|---|---|
| 6 ft 1 3/4 in (1.87 m) | 221 lb (100 kg) |
Values from NFL Combine

=== Denver Broncos ===
Harris was drafted in the fourth round by the Denver Broncos, where he was later waived.

=== Cincinnati Bengals ===
In 2001, the Bengals signed him off of waivers. He was released during the 2003 season.

=== Detroit Lions ===
The Lions signed Harris October 14, 2003 as a replacement for the injured John Jett and he established himself as the Lions punter for the remainder of the season. In 2005, he was named the Special Teams MVP by The Detroit Lions Quarterback Club, the official booster club of the Lions. On September 3, 2011, Harris was released by the Detroit Lions in favor for Ryan Donahue.

=== Jacksonville Jaguars ===
On October 11, 2011, he signed with the Jacksonville Jaguars. On April 28, 2012, the Jacksonville Jaguars released Harris.

=== Carolina Panthers ===
Harris signed with the Carolina Panthers on May 7, 2012. He was released on August 27, 2012.

=== Second stint with the Detroit Lions ===
Harris was signed by the Detroit Lions, for a second time, on September 25, 2012. The signing came after Ben Graham was placed on the season-ending injured reserve list.

=== Life after football ===
Following his football career, Nick Harris earned a Masters of Divinity degree in Christian Theology. In 2015, he began a teaching career at Berean Christian High School in Walnut Creek, California, serving as a Church History and Hermeneutics teacher. In 2019, Harris was hired as the school's principal.

== NFL career statistics ==
Legend
| **Bold** | Career high |

| Year | Team | Punting | | | | | | | | | |
| Year | Team | GP | Punts | Yds | Net Yds | Lng | Avg | Net Avg | Blk | Ins20 | TB |
|---|---|---|---|---|---|---|---|---|---|---|---|
| 2001 | CIN | **16** | 84 | 3,372 | 2,878 | 57 | 40.1 | 33.9 | **1** | 21 | 6 |
| 2002 | CIN | 15 | 65 | 2,608 | 2,074 | 57 | 40.1 | 31.4 | **1** | 11 | 4 |
| 2003 | CIN | 5 | 28 | 1,084 | 841 | 53 | 38.7 | 30.0 | 0 | 5 | 3 |
| 2003 | DET | 11 | 63 | 2,531 | 2,116 | 51 | 40.2 | 33.1 | **1** | 11 | 5 |
| 2004 | DET | **16** | **92** | 3,765 | 3,184 | 60 | 40.9 | 34.2 | **1** | 32 | 7 |
| 2005 | DET | **16** | 84 | 3,656 | 3,096 | 60 | 43.5 | 36.9 | 0 | **34** | 2 |
| 2006 | DET | **16** | 66 | 2,967 | 2,520 | **67** | **45.0** | **38.2** | 0 | 18 | **9** |
| 2007 | DET | **16** | 68 | 3,010 | 2,476 | 58 | 44.3 | 36.4 | 0 | 26 | 5 |
| 2008 | DET | **16** | 90 | 3,952 | **3,418** | 66 | 43.9 | 38.0 | 0 | 24 | 6 |
| 2009 | DET | **16** | 74 | 3,175 | 2,721 | 56 | 42.9 | 36.8 | 0 | 20 | 5 |
| 2010 | DET | **16** | 90 | **4,018** | 3,225 | 66 | 44.6 | 35.8 | 0 | 24 | 8 |
| 2011 | JAX | 11 | 72 | 3,075 | 2,729 | 55 | 42.7 | 37.9 | 0 | 13 | 5 |
| 2012 | DET | 13 | 67 | 2,783 | 2,522 | 58 | 41.5 | 37.6 | 0 | 21 | 1 |
| Career | | 183 | 943 | 39,996 | 33,800 | 67 | 42.4 | 35.7 | 4 | 260 | 66 |
