= Tony Williams (American football) =

American football player (born 1975)

No. 94
- Position: Defensive tackle

Personal information
- Born: July 9, 1975 (age 51); Germantown, Tennessee, U.S.
- Listed height: 6 ft 2 in (1.88 m)
- Listed weight: 296 lb (134 kg)

Career information
- High school: Germantown
- College: Memphis
- NFL draft: 1997: 5th round, 151st overall pick

Career history
- Minnesota Vikings (1997–2000); Cincinnati Bengals (2001–2004); Jacksonville Jaguars (2006)

Career NFL statistics
- Tackles: 261
- Sacks: 22
- Forced fumbles: 1
- Fumble recoveries: 5
- Stats at Pro Football Reference

Tony Williams (born July 9, 1975) is an American former professional football player who was a defensive tackle in the National Football League (NFL). He was selected by the Minnesota Vikings in the fifth round of the 1997 NFL draft. He played college football for the Memphis Tigers.

Williams also played for the Cincinnati Bengals and Jacksonville Jaguars.

== Professional career ==
Williams was selected by the Minnesota Vikings in the fifth round of the 1997 NFL draft. Williams spent the first four years with the Vikings. After the 2000 season he signed with the Cincinnati Bengals who he played for until 2004. Williams went un-signed for the 2005 season and was a free agent. Before the 2006 season he signed with the Jacksonville Jaguars but did not play in any games.

== NFL career statistics ==
Legend
| **Bold** | Career high |

=== Regular season ===
| Year | Team | Games | | Tackles | | | | Interceptions | | | | Fumbles | | | |
| Year | Team | GP | GS | Comb | Solo | Ast | Sck | Int | Yds | TD | Lng | FF | FR | Yds | TD |
|---|---|---|---|---|---|---|---|---|---|---|---|---|---|---|---|
| 1997 | MIN | 6 | 2 | 12 | 9 | 3 | 0.0 | 0 | 0 | 0 | 0 | 0 | 0 | 0 | 0 |
| 1998 | MIN | 14 | 9 | 36 | 26 | 10 | 1.0 | 0 | 0 | 0 | 0 | 0 | 1 | **6** | 0 |
| 1999 | MIN | 16 | 12 | **46** | **32** | 14 | **5.0** | 0 | 0 | 0 | 0 | 0 | 1 | 0 | 0 |
| 2000 | MIN | 14 | 12 | 33 | 27 | 6 | 4.0 | 0 | 0 | 0 | 0 | 0 | 0 | 0 | 0 |
| 2001 | CIN | 13 | 13 | 38 | 15 | **23** | **5.0** | 0 | 0 | 0 | 0 | 0 | **2** | 0 | 0 |
| 2002 | CIN | 16 | 16 | 42 | 30 | 12 | **5.0** | 0 | 0 | 0 | 0 | 0 | 0 | 0 | 0 |
| 2003 | CIN | 16 | 16 | 38 | 28 | 10 | 2.0 | 0 | 0 | 0 | 0 | **1** | 1 | -1 | 0 |
| 2004 | CIN | 6 | 6 | 16 | 10 | 6 | 0.0 | 0 | 0 | 0 | 0 | 0 | 0 | 0 | 0 |
| | | 101 | 86 | 261 | 177 | 84 | 22.0 | 0 | 0 | 0 | 0 | 1 | 5 | 5 | 0 |

=== Playoffs ===
| Year | Team | Games | | Tackles | | | | Interceptions | | | | Fumbles | | | |
| Year | Team | GP | GS | Comb | Solo | Ast | Sck | Int | Yds | TD | Lng | FF | FR | Yds | TD |
|---|---|---|---|---|---|---|---|---|---|---|---|---|---|---|---|
| 1997 | MIN | 2 | 2 | **14** | **11** | **3** | 0.0 | 0 | 0 | 0 | 0 | 0 | 0 | 0 | 0 |
| 1998 | MIN | 2 | 2 | 6 | 4 | 2 | **1.0** | 0 | 0 | 0 | 0 | 0 | 0 | 0 | 0 |
| 1999 | MIN | 2 | 1 | 3 | 2 | 1 | 0.0 | 0 | 0 | 0 | 0 | 0 | 0 | 0 | 0 |
| 2000 | MIN | 2 | 2 | 7 | 4 | **3** | 0.0 | 0 | 0 | 0 | 0 | 0 | 0 | 0 | 0 |
| | | 8 | 7 | 30 | 21 | 9 | 1.0 | 0 | 0 | 0 | 0 | 0 | 0 | 0 | 0 |
