= Mark Roman =

American football player (born 1977)

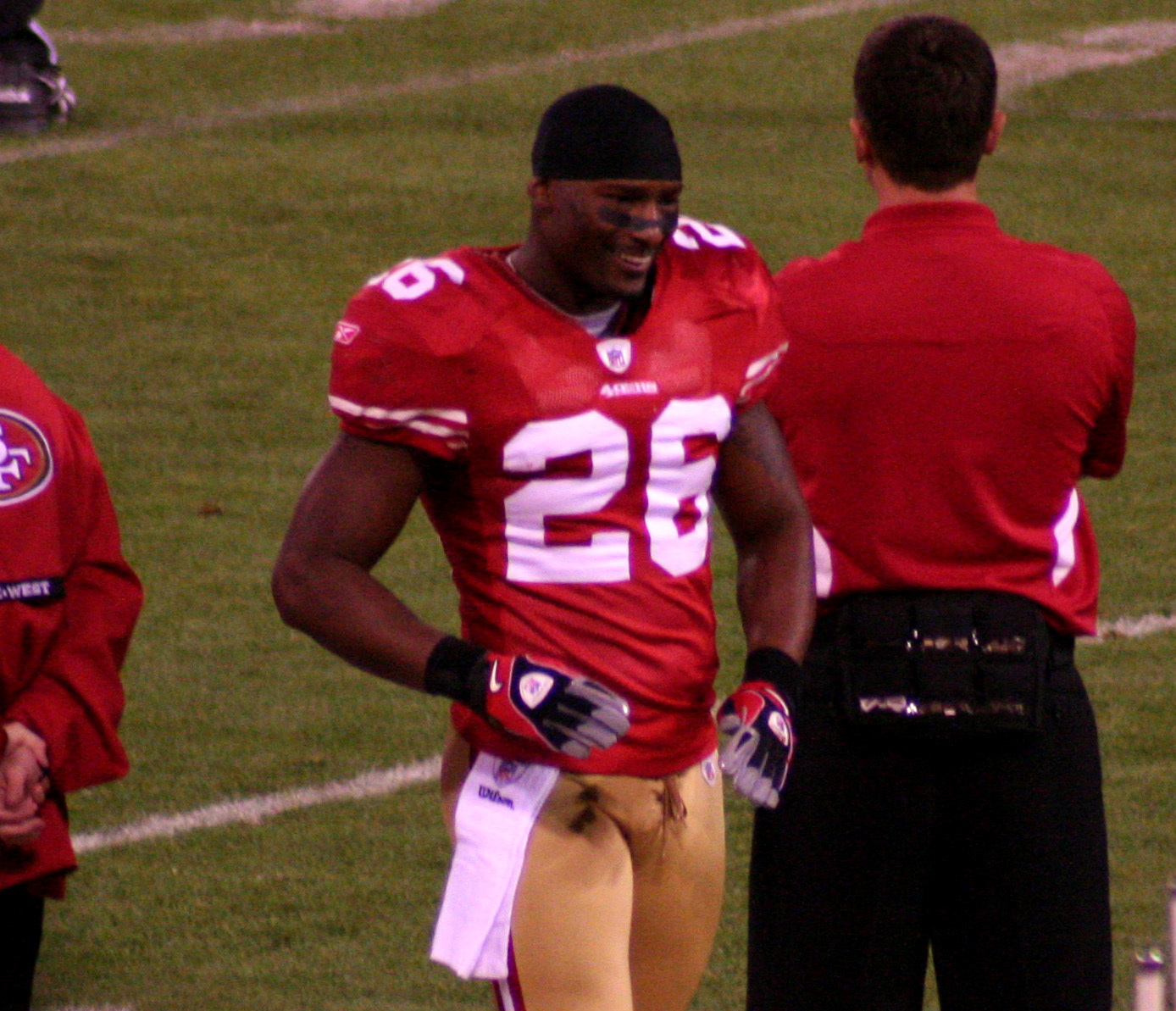
- Roman with the San Francisco 49ers in 2009

No. 20, 23, 26
- Position: Safety

Personal information
- Born: March 26, 1977 (age 49); New Iberia, Louisiana, U.S.
- Listed height: 5 ft 11 in (1.80 m)
- Listed weight: 205 lb (93 kg)

Career information
- High school: New Iberia
- College: LSU
- NFL draft: 2000: 2nd round, 34th overall pick

Career history
- Cincinnati Bengals (2000–2003); Green Bay Packers (2004–2005); San Francisco 49ers (2006–2009)

Career NFL statistics
- Total tackles: 561
- Sacks: 8
- Forced fumbles: 5
- Fumble recoveries: 13
- Interceptions: 6
- Stats at Pro Football Reference

Mark Emery Roman (born March 16, 1977) is an American former professional football player who was a safety in the National Football League (NFL) for the Cincinnati Bengals, Green Bay Packers, and San Francisco 49ers. He played college football for the LSU Tigers.

== Professional career ==
Pre-draft measurables
Height	Weight	40-yard dash
5 ft 10 7/8 in (1.80 m)	188 lb (85 kg)	4.55 s
All values from NFL Combine

The Cincinnati Bengals selected Roman in the second round (34th overall) of the 2000 NFL draft. Roman was the first safety drafted in 2000. He also became the highest safety drafted from LSU since Tommy Casanova in 1972, but was later surpassed by LaRon Landry (sixth overall) in 2007 and Jamal Adams (sixth overall) in 2017.

== NFL career statistics ==
Legend
**Bold**	Career high

=== Regular season ===
Year	Team	Games		Tackles					Interceptions					Fumbles			
Year	Team	GP	GS	Cmb	Solo	Ast	Sck	TFL	Int	Yds	TD	Lng	PD	FF	FR	Yds	TD
2000	CIN	8	2	17	16	1	0.0	0	0	0	0	0	2	**1**	2	0	0
2001	CIN	13	8	51	44	7	2.0	**5**	1	0	0	0	7	0	1	-1	0
2002	CIN	13	1	31	24	7	0.0	1	0	0	0	0	1	**1**	0	0	0
2003	CIN	**16**	**16**	74	55	19	0.5	0	1	1	0	1	**8**	**1**	0	0	0
2004	GB	**16**	15	72	53	19	**3.5**	3	0	0	0	0	2	0	0	0	0
2005	GB	**16**	**16**	**90**	**70**	**20**	0.0	2	**2**	18	0	12	**8**	0	2	0	0
2006	SF	**16**	11	59	47	12	1.0	3	1	**27**	0	**27**	7	**1**	1	0	0
2007	SF	**16**	**16**	61	46	15	0.0	0	0	0	0	0	4	0	**3**	**44**	0
2008	SF	**16**	**16**	53	39	14	0.0	1	0	0	0	0	5	0	1	0	0
2009	SF	**16**	1	53	46	7	1.0	3	1	**27**	0	**27**	2	**1**	**3**	25	0
Career		146	102	561	440	121	8.0	18	6	73	0	27	46	5	13	68	0

=== Playoffs ===
Year	Team	Games		Tackles					Interceptions					Fumbles			
Year	Team	GP	GS	Cmb	Solo	Ast	Sck	TFL	Int	Yds	TD	Lng	PD	FF	FR	Yds	TD
2004	GB	**1**	**1**	**3**	**3**	0	0.0	**1**	0	0	0	0	0	0	0	0	0
Career		1	1	3	3	0	0.0	1	0	0	0	0	0	0	0	0	0
