= Kevin Kaesviharn =

American football player (born 1976)

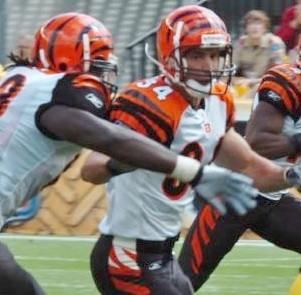
- Kaesviharn in 2006 with the Cincinnati Bengals

No. 34, 43, 26
- Position: Safety

Personal information
- Born: August 29, 1976 (age 50); Paramount, California, U.S.
- Listed height: 6 ft 1 in (1.85 m)
- Listed weight: 200 lb (91 kg)

Career information
- High school: Lakeville (Lakeville, Minnesota)
- College: Augustana
- NFL draft: 1998: undrafted

Career history
- Iowa Barstormers (1999–2000); San Francisco Demons (2001); Green Bay Packers (2001)*; Cincinnati Bengals (2001–2006); New Orleans Saints (2007–2008); Carolina Panthers (2009)*; Tennessee Titans (2009)
- * Offseason or practice squad member only

Awards and highlights
- First-team All-NCC (1997); Second-team All-NCC (1996); First-team All-Arena (2000)

Career NFL statistics
- Total tackles: 481
- Sacks: 6
- Forced fumbles: 2
- Fumble recoveries: 5
- Interceptions: 17
- Defensive touchdowns: 1
- Stats at Pro Football Reference
- Stats at ArenaFan.com

Kevin Robert Kaesviharn (born August 29, 1976) is an American former professional football player who was a safety in the National Football League (NFL). He was signed by the Iowa Barnstormers as a street free agent in 1998. He played college football for the Augustana Vikings.

Kaesviharn was also a member of the San Francisco Demons, Green Bay Packers, Cincinnati Bengals, New Orleans Saints and Carolina Panthers.

== Early life ==
He was born in Paramount, California. His father is an immigrant from Thailand. At Lakeville High School in Lakeville, Minnesota, Kaesviharn lettered in football, track, and basketball.

== College career ==
Graduating in 1994, he attended Augustana College in Sioux Falls, South Dakota, an NCAA Division II school and was a three-year starter for the Vikings. He finished his collegiate career with 167 tackles, six interceptions, and 34 passes defensed.

As a freshman, Kaesviharn was credited with seven tackles (four solo) and one pass defense. In 1995, he started at cornerback, recording 45 tackles (29 solo), two interceptions, 10 passes defended and two fumble recoveries.

He had a standout year in 1996 and was named an All-North Central Conference Second-team defensive back, picking up 47 tackles (26 solo), two interceptions and 11 passes defended.

Kaesviharn finished his collegiate career at cornerback in 1997 as a four-year letter winner. Shortly after his senior season he participated in the Division II All-Star game and was named First-team All-North Central Conference at cornerback, Academic All-North Central Conference, GTE Academic All-American District VII Second-team and Daktronics Division II All-Midwest Region Second-team. At season end, he was ranked third on the team with 68 tackles (44 of which were solo), and led the team with two interceptions and 12 pass breakups.

As a member of Augustana's Track and Field Program, he placed fourth in the triple jump and sixth in the long jump in the North Central Conference Outdoor Championships. Kaesviharn graduated with a degree in Mathematics and Physical Education.

== Professional career ==
=== Iowa Barnstormers ===
After going undrafted in the 1998 NFL draft, Kaesviharn spent one year out of football where he worked as a long term substitute teacher at Sioux Falls (SD) Washington High School, before signing with the Arena Football League's Iowa Barnstormers.

In 1999, Kaesviharn was named the Barnstormers' Rookie of the Year, leading the team with five interceptions for the season despite having played in only 10 games before breaking a bone in his foot.

His strong success continued into 2000, when Kaesviharn was named to the All-Arena First-team at Defensive Specialist, as the third player in AFL history to register more than 100 tackles in a single season. His 107 tackles were ranked second in the AFL overall. He set a Barnstormers record that year with 10 interceptions (for 81 yards) in one season.

In his two years with the Barnstormers, Kaesviharn recorded 133 tackles, 15 interceptions, 19 pass deflections, one fumble recovery, and caught six passes for 93 yards as a wide receiver.

=== San Francisco Demons ===
In 2000, Kaesviharn was selected by the San Francisco Demons for the inaugural season of the XFL. Over the course of the season he was credited with 41 tackles (32 solo), three interceptions and three passes defended. He recorded 3 punt returns for a total of 25 yards (averaging 8.3 yards per carry). The Demons went 5-5 for the season, finishing second in their division and going on to the Million Dollar Game vs. the Los Angeles Xtreme. On April 21, 2001, the Xtreme defeated the Demons 38–6.

=== Green Bay Packers ===
In 2001, Kaesviharn started his NFL career signing as an undrafted free agent with the Green Bay Packers, but was waived just before their season opener.

=== Cincinnati Bengals ===
He was signed to the Cincinnati Bengals' squad four weeks later. During his stretch with the Bengals, Kaesviharn played in 87 games and logged 363 tackles (286 solo), six sacks, 15 interceptions, 28 passes defended and four fumble recoveries; one of which resulted in a touchdown when he returned the ball three yards on a Lee Suggs fumble in the second quarter vs. the Cleveland Browns on October 17, 2004. In 2006, he had his best year as a Bengal, despite only playing in 14 games, and starting in seven of them. Kaesviharn recorded six interceptions, along with four sacks for the season.

=== New Orleans Saints ===
On March 13, 2007, after five full seasons with the Bengals, Kaesviharn signed a four-year contract with the New Orleans Saints. He was released on March 26, 2009.

=== Carolina Panthers ===
Kaesviharn was signed by the Carolina Panthers on August 24, 2009, after safety Charles Godfrey underwent surgery on a broken hand. Wide receiver Jason Carter was waived to make room for Kaesviharn on the roster.

=== Tennessee Titans ===
Kaesviharn signed with the Tennessee Titans on September 29, 2009.

== NFL career statistics ==
Legend
**Bold**	Career high

=== Regular season ===
Year	Team	Games		Tackles					Interceptions					Fumbles			
Year	Team	GP	GS	Cmb	Solo	Ast	Sck	TFL	Int	Yds	TD	Lng	PD	FF	FR	Yds	TD
2001	CIN	10	3	32	29	3	0.0	1	3	**41**	0	**29**	6	0	0	0	0
2002	CIN	**16**	5	52	45	7	0.0	0	2	17	0	17	**10**	**1**	0	0	0
2003	CIN	**16**	7	64	52	12	1.0	1	1	10	0	10	4	0	0	0	0
2004	CIN	15	6	66	50	16	0.0	2	0	0	0	0	8	0	1	**3**	**1**
2005	CIN	**16**	**16**	**87**	**63**	**24**	1.0	2	3	9	0	6	8	0	**3**	0	0
2006	CIN	14	7	64	49	15	**4.0**	**4**	**6**	24	0	22	9	**1**	0	0	0
2007	NOR	**16**	3	36	33	3	0.0	1	0	0	0	0	8	0	1	2	0
2008	NOR	11	11	64	49	15	0.0	2	2	13	0	13	4	0	0	0	0
2009	TEN	13	0	16	14	2	0.0	1	0	0	0	0	1	0	0	0	0
		127	58	481	384	97	6.0	14	17	114	0	29	58	2	5	5	1

=== Playoffs ===
Year	Team	Games		Tackles					Interceptions					Fumbles			
Year	Team	GP	GS	Cmb	Solo	Ast	Sck	TFL	Int	Yds	TD	Lng	PD	FF	FR	Yds	TD
2005	CIN	**1**	**1**	**6**	**4**	**2**	0.0	**1**	0	0	0	0	0	0	0	0	0
		1	1	6	4	2	0.0	1	0	0	0	0	0	0	0	0	0
