= Lorenzo Neal =

American football player (born 1970)

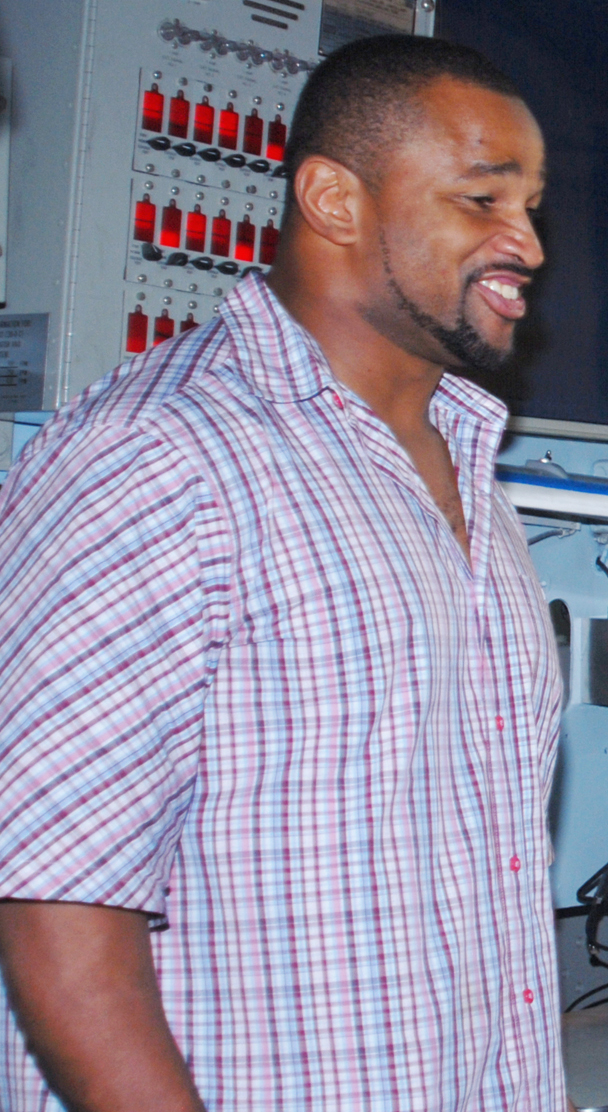
- Neal in 2008

No. 23, 22, 41, 42
- Position: Fullback

Personal information
- Born: December 27, 1970 (age 55); Hanford, California, U.S.
- Listed height: 5 ft 11 in (1.80 m)
- Listed weight: 255 lb (116 kg)

Career information
- High school: Lemoore (Lemoore, California)
- College: Fresno State (1989–1992)
- NFL draft: 1993: 4th round, 89th overall pick

Career history
- New Orleans Saints (1993–1996); New York Jets (1997); Tampa Bay Buccaneers (1998); Tennessee Titans (1999–2000); Cincinnati Bengals (2001–2002); San Diego Chargers (2003–2007); Baltimore Ravens (2008); Oakland Raiders (2009)*
- * Offseason or practice squad member only

Awards and highlights
- 2× First-team All-Pro (2006, 2007); Second-team All-Pro (2005); 4× Pro Bowl (2002, 2005–2007); NFL 2000s All-Decade Team; 2× First-team All-Big West (1991, 1992); Fresno State Bulldogs No. 22 retired

Career NFL statistics
- Rushing yards: 807
- Rushing average: 3.6
- Rushing touchdowns: 6
- Receptions: 199
- Receiving yards: 1,086
- Receiving touchdowns: 12
- Stats at Pro Football Reference

Lorenzo LaVonne Neal (born December 27, 1970) is an American former professional football player who was a fullback in the National Football League (NFL) for 16 seasons. Neal played college football for the Fresno State Bulldogs and was selected by the New Orleans Saints in the fourth round of the 1993 NFL draft. A four-time Pro Bowl selection and three-time All-Pro, he was also a member of the New York Jets, the Tampa Bay Buccaneers, the Tennessee Titans, the Cincinnati Bengals, the San Diego Chargers, the Baltimore Ravens and the Oakland Raiders. Considered one of the best blocking fullbacks in NFL history, Neal blocked for a 1,000-plus-yard running back in 11 straight seasons from 1997 to 2007.

== Early life ==
Neal attended Lemoore High School in Lemoore, California and was a letterman in football and wrestling. He set many rushing records for the Lemoore Tigers football team, including having over 2,000 rushing yards in a season. In wrestling, Neal was a state champion his senior year.

== College career ==
Neal originally signed with Arizona in February 1989, but didn't qualify academically and was denied admission. He then enrolled at Fresno State University that August, where he played for the Fresno State Bulldogs football team from 1989 to 1992. During his four college seasons, he rushed for 2,405 yards. He was an All-Big West selection his junior and senior seasons. He also wrestled and placed seventh, earning All-American honors at the 1992 NCAA wrestling tournament in the 275-pound heavyweight class. Neal finished his career as the school's second-leading rusher with 2,405 yards and played in the Japan Bowl All-Star Game. He defeated a sumo wrestler in an exhibition match in Japan during the Japan Bowl. He graduated with a degree in criminal justice.

In 1991, he ran for 837 yards and 8 touchdowns. In 1992, he ran for 988 yards and 10 touchdowns.

== Professional career ==
Pre-draft measurables
Height	Weight	Arm length	Hand span	40-yard dash	10-yard split	20-yard split	20-yard shuttle	Vertical jump	Broad jump	Bench press
5 ft 10 3/8 in (1.79 m)	236 lb (107 kg)	30 1/4 in (0.77 m)	10 1/4 in (0.26 m)	4.84 s	1.68 s	2.82 s	4.38 s	30.5 in (0.77 m)	8 ft 8 in (2.64 m)	27 reps

=== New Orleans Saints ===
Neal was selected in the fourth round (89th overall) of the 1993 NFL draft by the New Orleans Saints.

Neal, as a halfback made his NFL debut on September 5, against the Houston Oilers and led the team in rushing with 13 carries for 89 yards, it was his first of two starts as a rookie. Just seven days later, he suffered a season-ending ankle injury during a road game against the Atlanta Falcons. Then on September 15, he was placed on Injured Reserve, ending his season. He was later told he would not be able to run as he had before, so his coaches proposed the idea that he be switched to fullback.

Then in 1994, he set career highs with 30 carries for 90 yards and one touchdown. In 1995, he caught a career-long 69-yard touchdown pass during a road game against the New England Patriots on December 3. In 1996, he set career highs with 31 receptions for 194 receiving yards in his last season with the Saints.

=== New York Jets ===
In 1997, Neal signed with the New York Jets, on March 31. In his one season with the team, he helped running back Adrian Murrell rush for 1,086 yards.

=== Tampa Bay Buccaneers ===
On March 12, 1998, Neal was traded to the Tampa Bay Buccaneers for a fifth-round pick. In his season in Tampa Bay, he helped Warrick Dunn rush for 1,026 yards. He was then released by the Buccaneers on February 11, 1999.

=== Tennessee Titans ===
On March 23, 1999, Neal signed with the Tennessee Titans. During his first season with the team, he helped Eddie George rush for 1,304 yards in the regular season, and two 100-yard games in the playoffs. Neal fielded the kick of the "Music City Miracle" against the Buffalo Bills, where he handed it off to Frank Wycheck, who then threw the game-winning lateral to Kevin Dyson. Neal and the Titans appeared in Super Bowl XXXIV against the St. Louis Rams, losing 23–16. He was selected to USA Today's All-Joe team.

In 2000, Neal helped George rush for 1,509 yards and 14 touchdowns. Neal was named the "NFL's Best Blocking Fullback" by the Sporting News. He was also named to Sports Illustrated's midseason All-Pro team. He was also named a Pro Bowl third-alternate. He was released by the Titans on March 1, 2001.

=== Cincinnati Bengals ===
After two seasons with the Titans and one Super Bowl appearance, Neal signed with the Cincinnati Bengals on May 8, 2001, where in his first season with the team, he helped Corey Dillon rush for 1,315 yards. After the season, Neal was named to USA Today's All-Joe team. He was also selected as a Pro Bowl second-alternate.

In 2002, Neal helped Dillon rush for 1,311 yards. He also recorded a one-yard touchdown reception against his former team, the Tennessee Titans, on October 27. He was selected to his first Pro Bowl.

=== San Diego Chargers ===
On March 3, 2003, Neal signed with the San Diego Chargers and began the longest stint with one team of his career, five seasons. During his first season blocking for LaDainian Tomlinson, he helped Tomlinson rush for 1,645 yards and the team to rush for a total of 2,146 yards. Tomlinson became the fifth 1,000-yard rusher that Neal blocked for. Neal scored his first touchdown of the season on a three-yard run on the road against the Oakland Raiders on September 28. He also carried the ball three times for seven yards in short-yardage situations against the Baltimore Ravens on September 21, all three of which resulted in first downs. He recorded a season-high seven carries for 22 yards on the road against the Cleveland Browns on October 19. For the season, he was named to USA Today's All-Joe team, as well as a Pro Bowl first-alternate.

In 2004, Neal helped Tomlinson rush for 1,335 yards and the Chargers rush for 2,185 yards total. Neal also recorded a 12-yard kickoff return against his former team, the Tampa Bay Buccaneers, on December 12. He was also named Chargers Alumni Player of Week after rushing four times for a season-high 16 yards on the road against the Browns on December 19. He was, once again, named to USA Today's All-Joe team. He was also named a Pro Bowl first-alternate, once again.

The 2005 season began with an historic moment in Neal's career: he played in his 200th career game in the season opener against the Dallas Cowboys, a game in which he recorded three carries on short-yardage plays, all resulting in first downs. For the season he was named a Pro Bowl starter. He was also named to the "All-Interview" team by NFL.com. On October 28, 2005, he signed a two-year contract extension through 2007.

In 2006, Neal helped Tomlinson and Michael Turner record 194 rushing yards for the September 11 season opening 27–0 win in Oakland. The Chargers scored two rushing touchdowns, one by Tomlinson and one by Turner. Neal helped block for a 241-rushing yard performance against the Titans in a 40–7 Week 2 win, which included two Tomlinson rushing touchdowns. On October 15, during a road game against the San Francisco 49ers, Neal helped Tomlinson tie a team record and set a career-high with four rushing touchdowns. In the Chargers 35–27 win over the Browns on November 5, Neal played in his 200th consecutive game and helped the Chargers rush for 190 yards and three touchdowns. During the November 19 35–27 Chargers win, he helped Tomlinson rush for 105 yards and three touchdowns, which put Tomlinson over 1,000 yards for the season, marking the 10th-straight year Neal was the lead blocker for a 1,000-yard rusher. He scored his first touchdown of the season against the Denver Broncos on December 10, on a four-yard trick play run called the "Bumarooski" late in the first quarter. It was his first rushing touchdown since September 28, 2003 at Oakland and gave the Chargers a 14–0 lead. He also threw a key block on Kansas City Chiefs linebacker Kendrell Bell that helped Tomlinson run for a career-long 85-yard touchdown on December 17; it was the third-longest run in team history. Neal also helped contribute to the Chargers recording 265 rushing yards, fifth-most in team history. He was named to his third Pro Bowl and was a first-team All-Pro selection by the Associated Press, USA Today, Sports Weekly and ESPN.com.

In 2007, Neal had his streak of 221 consecutive games played come to an end when he was inactive for Week 14 against the Detroit Lions, while he recovered from a broken leg suffered the previous week against the Titans; he had not missed a game since 1994. Against the Chiefs, he helped Tomlinson surpass 1,000 yards, marking the 11th-straight season as the lead blocker for a 1,000-yard rusher. Neal recorded a touchdown reception on a fourth-and-goal play in Week 2 on the road against the New England Patriots, (his first touchdown reception since 2005). He was named to his fourth Pro Bowl and was named first-team All-Pro by the Associated Press and All-NFL by USA Today and Sports Weekly. On February 28, 2008, Neal was waived by San Diego.

=== Baltimore Ravens ===
On August 12, 2008, the Baltimore Ravens signed Neal to a one-year contract.

Neal played in his first game with the Ravens in Week 1 against the Bengals, when he served as the back-up to Le'Ron McClain and helped the Ravens rush for 229 yards and recorded one reception for 13 yards. During Week 2, he carried the ball once for two yards and helped the Ravens hold the ball for 13:18 in the fourth quarter against the Browns. During Week 5, on the road against the Indianapolis Colts he subbed for McClain and helped protect rookie quarterback Joe Flacco, allowing him to set career-highs with a 73.7% completion and 241 passing yards. During Week 8 in Cleveland, Neal subbed for McClain and helped the Ravens rush for a season high 193 yards in the 37–27 victory. He also carried the ball once for two yards. In Week 10 (at the New York Giants), Neal started his first game as a Raven and helped protect Joe Flacco, allowing him to complete 60.6% of his passes and holding the Giants to just one sack.

=== Oakland Raiders ===
Neal was signed by the Oakland Raiders on May 8, 2009. He was waived/injured on August 19 to make room for safety Rashad Baker and subsequently reverted to injured reserve. He was released by the Raiders with an injury settlement on August 26. He was expected to push Oren O'Neal and Luke Lawton for the starting fullback job. In September 2009, Neal was selected to the Sporting News Magazine's Team of the Decade for the 2000s.

=== NFL statistics ===
Rushing Statistics

Year	Team	Games	Carries	Yards	Yards per carry	Longest carry	Touchdowns	First downs	Fumbles	Fumbles lost
1993	NO	2	21	175	8.3	74	1	6	1	1
1994	NO	16	30	90	3.0	12	1	7	1	1
1995	NO	16	5	3	0.6	3	0	2	2	1
1996	NO	16	21	58	2.8	11	1	5	0	0
1997	NYJ	16	10	28	2.8	8	0	2	0	0
1998	TB	16	5	25	5.0	12	0	1	0	0
1999	TEN	16	2	1	0.5	1	1	1	0	0
2000	TEN	16	1	-2	-2.0	-2	0	0	0	0
2001	CIN	16	5	10	2.0	4	0	0	0	0
2002	CIN	16	9	31	3.4	9	0	3	0	0
2003	SD	16	18	40	2.2	7	1	7	0	0
2004	SD	16	16	53	3.3	8	0	11	1	1
2005	SD	16	29	98	3.4	9	0	19	0	0
2006	SD	16	29	140	4.8	43	1	21	1	0
2007	SD	13	13	32	2.5	10	0	5	0	0
2008	BAL	16	12	25	2.1	5	0	6	0	0
Career		239	226	807	3.6	74	6	96	6	4

== Personal life ==
Neal and wife Denisha have one son, Lorenzo Jr., and twin daughters, Nylya and Mia. Lorenzo Jr. played college football for the Purdue Boilermakers. After going undrafted in the NFL draft, Lorenzo Jr. was signed by the New Orleans Saints but was waived in August 2021. The Denver Broncos claimed Lorenzo Jr. off of waivers but he was waived during final roster cuts.

== Podcast ==
Neal and Ray Oldhafer, long time cohort of Adam Carolla, started the NFL Podcast "Ray and Lorenzo" under Carolla Digital, which was launched on September 6, 2013.

In 2018 Bleav podcast network launched a Chargers oriented podcast called "Bleav in Chargers". Since 2020 Lorenzo has hosted the podcast with Chargers beat writer Fernando Ramirez, who joined Lorenzo in February 2021.

== Radio career ==
Neal was a co-host on the morning show Mornings with Joe, Lo, and Dibs on San Francisco radio station 95.7 The Game until 2020. He is now a guest/substitute host at the station.
