= Justin Smith (defensive end) =

American football player (born 1979)

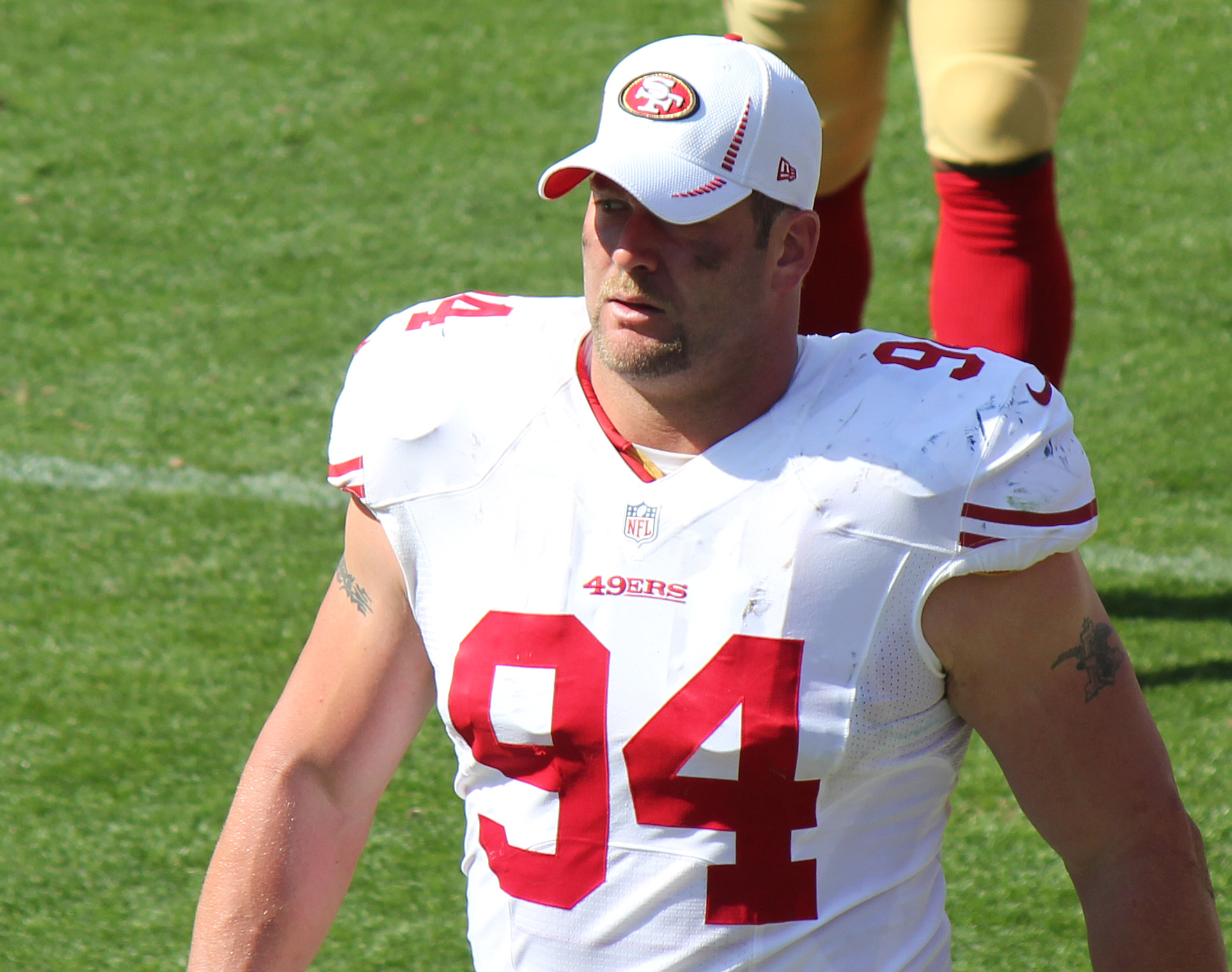
- Smith with the San Francisco 49ers in 2012

No. 90, 94
- Position: Defensive end

Personal information
- Born: September 30, 1979 (age 47); Jefferson City, Missouri, U.S.
- Listed height: 6 ft 4 in (1.93 m)
- Listed weight: 285 lb (129 kg)

Career information
- High school: Jefferson City
- College: Missouri (1998–2000)
- NFL draft: 2001: 1st round, 4th overall pick

Career history
- Cincinnati Bengals (2001–2007); San Francisco 49ers (2008–2014)

Awards and highlights
- 2× First-team All-Pro (2011 (Note: Selected as a defensive tackle), 2012 (Note: Selected as a defensive tackle)); 2× Second-team All-Pro (2012, 2013 (Note: Selected as a defensive tackle)); 5× Pro Bowl (2009–2013); PFWA NFL All-Rookie Team (2001); Cincinnati Bengals 40th Anniversary Team; First-team All-American (2000); 2× First-team All-Big 12 (1999, 2000); Big 12 Defensive Freshman of the Year (1998)

Career NFL statistics
- Tackles: 884
- Sacks: 87
- Forced fumbles: 16
- Fumble recoveries: 10
- Pass deflections: 16
- Interceptions: 3
- Stats at Pro Football Reference

Justin Smith (born September 30, 1979), nicknamed "the Cowboy", is an American former professional football player who was a defensive end in the National Football League (NFL) for 14 seasons. He played college football for the Missouri Tigers, earning All-American honors. He played for the Cincinnati Bengals for seven seasons after being chosen with the fourth overall pick in the 2001 NFL draft. Smith also played seven seasons for the San Francisco 49ers.

== Early life ==
Smith was born in Jefferson City, Missouri. He attended Jefferson City High School, where he played high school football for the Jefferson City Jays.

== College career ==
Smith played for the Missouri Tigers football team while majoring in general studies at the University of Missouri. In 1998, he became the first true freshman to start every game for Missouri since 1986 and was named Big 12 Defensive Freshman of the Year. As a sophomore, Smith set a new school sack record with eight and was named to first-team All-Big 12. In his junior season, Smith logged 11 sacks, 24 tackles-for-loss, and 97 total tackles. He broke his own sacks record that he set the previous year and set a new school record for tackles-for-loss. He earned first-team All-American honors from the Football Writers Association of America and garnered first-team All-Big 12 honors for the second year in a row. He entered the 2001 NFL draft following his junior year.

== Professional career ==
=== Cincinnati Bengals ===
Justin was selected by the Cincinnati Bengals in first round (fourth overall) of the 2001 NFL draft. He signed with the team on September 8, following protracted contract negotiations, and had roster exemption for the September 9 season opener vs. New England. He signed a six-year, $10 million contract that included a $1.25 million signing bonus. Despite missing all of the preseason as well as the first regular-season game, Smith logged a Bengals rookie-record 8.5 sacks, breaking the mark of 8.0 set by James Francis in 1990. He finished second on the line in total tackles (53) and first in solos (41) and had the second-most sacks by an NFL rookie in 2001, topped only by the 9.0 of Pittsburgh's Kendrell Bell.

In his second season with the Bengals, he started every game at right defensive end and led the team in both sacks (6.5) and sack yardage (56) while also leading the defensive line in tackles (59). He played 95.5 percent of the defensive snaps (934 of 978), second on the team. His 6.5 sacks, gave him a total of 15 over his first two seasons, the most by a Cincinnati Bengal in his first two seasons since 1976–77.

In his third season with the Bengals, he recorded 60 tackles, 41 of which were solo. He also added another 5.0 sacks while also playing outside linebacker.

His fourth season saw him lead the team in sacks (8.0) and sack yardage (70.5). He also led the defense in snaps played (94.4 percent), and he recorded 70 tackles.

In 2005, Smith led the team once again in sacks (6.0), making it his third time to lead the team in his five seasons. In his other two seasons, he finished one sack or less behind the team leader. By the end of his fifth year, he had moved into fifth place on Bengals all-time sacks list with a total of 34.

On February 15, 2007, the Bengals designated the franchise tag on him. He signed the one-year franchise contract that earned him $8.64 million in 2007. He led the league in assisted tackles in 2007 with 29.

=== San Francisco 49ers ===
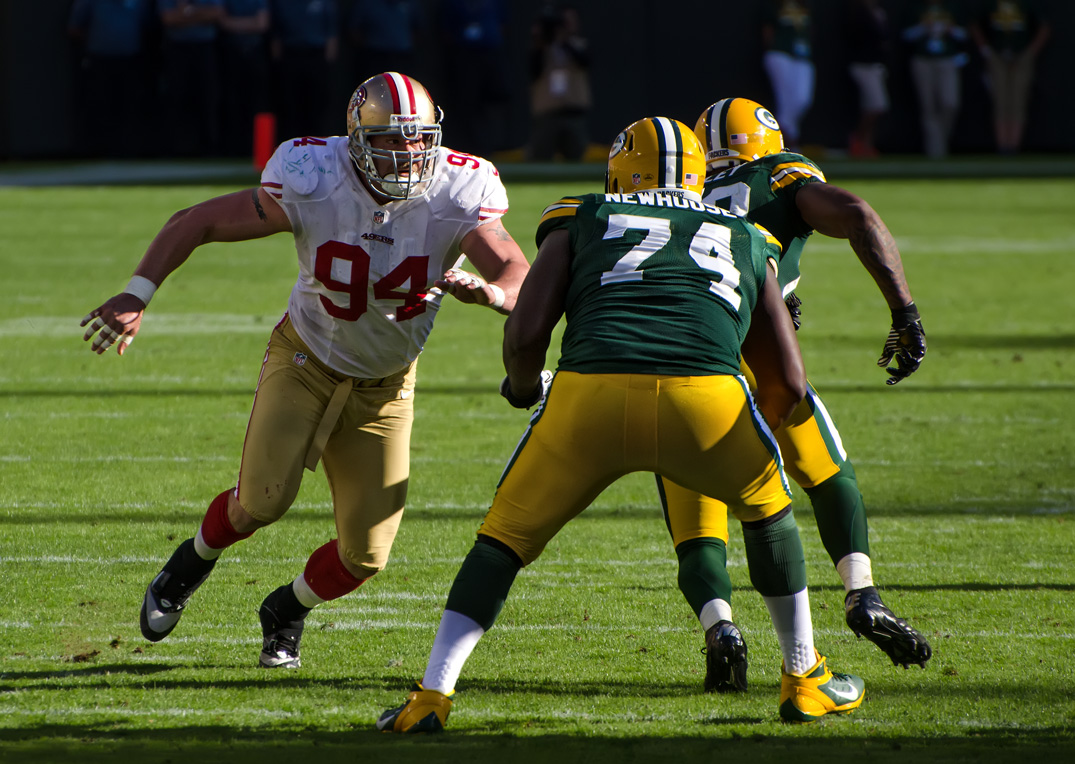
Justin Smith lined up against Marshall Newhouse in 2012

On March 1, 2008, he signed a six-year, $45 million deal with the San Francisco 49ers. The deal included an $11 million signing bonus. In his first season with San Francisco, Smith registered 7 sacks, 73 tackles and one interception.

Smith was selected for five consecutive Pro Bowls from 2009 to 2013. In 2011 and 2012, he was named an All-Pro both as a defensive end and tackle. He was eligible for the honor at both positions because the 49ers used him as a defensive end in their 3–4 base defense, while frequently moving him inside to DT for their 4–2 nickel defense. He had been mentioned by many pundits as a candidate to win the 2011 NFL Defensive Player of the Year Award, and finished third with 6 out of 50 votes.

At the end of the 2012 season, Smith and the 49ers appeared in Super Bowl XLVII. In the game, he had three combined tackles as the 49ers fell to the Baltimore Ravens by a score of 34–31.

Smith appeared on the NFL Top 100 Players of 2012, and was projected by his peers to be the 17th best player coming into the 2012 season.

On May 18, 2015, Smith announced that he had decided to retire after 14 seasons in the NFL.

=== NFL statistics ===
Legend
**Bold**	Career high

Season	Team	Games		Tackles				Interceptions					Fumbles	
Season	Team	GP	GS	Total	Solo	Ast	Sacks	PD	Int	Yards	Long	TD	FF	FR
2001	CIN	15	11	53	41	12	**8.5**	**3**	**2**	**28**	**21**	–	0	–
2002	CIN	16	16	59	47	12	6.5	2	–	–	–	–	2	–
2003	CIN	16	16	60	41	19	5.0	**3**	–	–	–	–	1	–
2004	CIN	16	16	70	41	**29**	8.0	2	–	–	–	–	2	**2**
2005	CIN	16	16	65	45	20	6.0	2	–	–	–	–	1	1
2006	CIN	16	16	**81**	50	31	7.5	**3**	–	–	–	–	1	**2**
2007	CIN	16	16	78	49	**29**	2.0	**3**	–	–	–	–	–	–
2008	SF	16	16	73	50	23	7.0	**3**	1	0	0	–	1	–
2009	SF	16	16	55	40	15	6.0	1	–	–	–	–	2	**2**
2010	SF	16	16	70	**57**	13	**8.5**	1	–	–	–	–	1	–
2011	SF	16	16	58	45	13	7.5	2	–	–	–	–	**3**	1
2012	SF	14	14	66	47	19	3.0	2	–	–	–	–	–	1
2013	SF	16	16	49	32	17	6.5	–	–	–	–	–	1	–
2014	SF	16	16	43	28	15	5.0	–	–	–	–	–	2	1
Career		221	217	880	613	267	87.0	29	3	28	21	–	17	10

== Personal life ==
Smith is originally from the town of Holts Summit, Missouri, which is near Jefferson City, the state capital. He earned All-State honors and was two-time all-district football choice at Jefferson City High School. While at JCHS, he was selected to SuperPrep's All-American and Top 50 teams as a senior. He was once the owner of Railwood Golf Club in central Missouri. His son, Wyatt, was a four-star recruit at defensive end who is committed to Ohio State.
