= Ligarius Jennings =

American football player (born 1977)

No. 25
- Position: Cornerback

Personal information
- Born: November 3, 1977 (age 49); Birmingham, Alabama, U.S.
- Listed height: 5 ft 8 in (1.73 m)
- Listed weight: 202 lb (92 kg)

Career information
- High school: Wenonah (Birmingham)
- College: Tennessee State
- NFL draft: 2001: undrafted

Career history
- Detroit Lions (2001)*; Cincinnati Bengals (2001–2002); Amsterdam Admirals (2002, 2004)
- * Offseason or practice squad member only

Awards and highlights
- 2× second-team All-OVC (1999, 2000)

Career NFL statistics
- Games played: 18
- Tackles: 21
- Passes defended: 1
- Stats at Pro Football Reference

Ligarius Terez Jennings (born November 3, 1977) is an American former professional football player who was a cornerback in the National Football League (NFL). He played college football for the Tennessee State Tigers. An undrafted free agent out of college, he played for the Cincinnati Bengals from 2001 to 2002 and the Amsterdam Admirals of NFL Europe in 2002 and 2004.

== Early life and college career ==
Ligarius Jennings was named after Quintus Ligarius, a Roman general who was a character in Shakespeare's Julius Caesar. Born and raised in Birmingham, Alabama, Jennings attended Wenonah High School. Jennings played football and baseball at Wenonah and was part of an undefeated football season as a senior.

At Tennessee State University, Jennings played at cornerback for Tennessee State Tigers football from 1997 to 2000. Jennings made 25 tackles and two interceptions in 1997. In 1998, Jennings had 49 tackles, 11 passes defended, three fumble recoveries, and three interceptions. As a junior in 1999, Jennings had 47 tackles, one sack, one interception, and 15 passes defended. As a senior in 2000, Jennings had 61 tackles and two interceptions. Jennings had a total of 176 tackles and seven interceptions at Tennessee State, and he was in the All-Ohio Valley Conference (OVC) second-teams in 1999 and 2000. Jennings was part of OVC championship teams in 1998 and 1999. Jennings graduated from Tennessee State with a B.B.A. in business information systems.

== Professional career ==
After the 2001 NFL draft, Jennings signed with the Detroit Lions as an undrafted free agent. Following the preseason, Jennings was released on September 2 before signing with the Lions' practice squad two days later.

On October 16, 2001, the Cincinnati Bengals signed Jennings to the active roster off the Lions practice squad to replace the injured Rodney Heath. Jennings made his NFL debut on October 21 against the Chicago Bears, coming off the bench at nickelback with three tackles. Jennings concluded the 2001 season playing in nine games with 12 tackles.

In the spring of 2002, Jennings played for the Amsterdam Admirals of NFL Europe. Playing in 10 games with nine starts, Jennings had 45 tackles, nine passes defended, and two interceptions. With the Bengals in 2002, Jennings played in nine games with nine total tackles and one pass defended. In the November 9 game against the Baltimore Ravens, Jennings had a season ending injury after tearing his left ACL while blocking on a punt return. The Bengals released Jennings on June 9, 2003.

Jennings returned to football with the Amsterdam Admirals after being selected by the team in the fourth round of the 2004 NFL Europe Free Agent Draft. In the 2004 NFL Europe season, Jennings played in 10 games with two starts and recorded 21 tackles and a fumble recovery.
