= Sir Alexander Spearman, 1st Baronet =

British civil servant

Sir Alexander Young Spearman, 1st Baronet, PC (13 September 1793 – 20 November 1874) was a British civil servant. According to a later assessment, he was "one of the most remarkable public servants of his age, who did much to establish the reputation of the Civil Service and to influence its traditions in the critical phase of its development in the nineteenth century."

== Biography ==
Spearman was born in Pentridge, Dorset, the eldest son of Major Alexander Young Spearman, RA (1762–1808), of Thornley, Durham, and Agnes, daughter of James Morton, of Bonar Hill, Lanarkshire. His paternal grandmother was the sister of Sir William Young, Lieutenant-Governor of Tobago.

Spearman joined the public service in 1808, aged fifteen, as deputy assistant commissary-general. In 1816, he became chief clerk to John Charles Herries, auditor of the Civil List. In 1822 he investigated irregularities in the Stationery Office, and in 1833 he was made controller of the Stationery Office. In 1824, he joined the Treasury as assistant clerk in the revenue department and clerk of parliamentary accounts. From 1827 to 1828, he was private secretary to Herries when the latter was Chancellor of the Exchequer. In 1831, he became auditor of the civil list. In 1836, he was promoted to Assistant Secretary to the Treasury. In 1840, he retired on health grounds and was created a Baronet, of Hanwell in the County of Middlesex.

In 1850, he emerged from retirement to serve as secretary and comptroller of the National Debt Office. He also served as deputy chairman of the Public Works Loan Board and as one of the commissioners for the Exhibition of 1851. Sworn of the Privy Council in 1869, he retired in 1873.

In 1826, Spearman married Jane Campbell (died 1877), daughter of Duncan Campbell of Inverawe, Argyll, and of Bedford Square, London; they had four sons.

== See also ==
- Spearman baronets
