= Peter Warrick =

American football player (born 1977)

No. 80, 81
- Position: Wide receiver

Personal information
- Born: June 19, 1977 (age 49); Bradenton, Florida, U.S.
- Listed height: 5 ft 11 in (1.80 m)
- Listed weight: 195 lb (88 kg)

Career information
- High school: Southeast (Bradenton)
- College: Florida State (1995–1999)
- NFL draft: 2000: 1st round, 4th overall pick

Career history
- Cincinnati Bengals (2000–2004); Seattle Seahawks (2005); Las Vegas Gladiators (2007)*; Montreal Alouettes (2008)*; California Redwoods (2009)*; Bloomington Extreme (2009); Cincinnati Commandos (2011)*
- * Offseason or practice squad member only

Awards and highlights
- BCS national champion (1999); Paul Warfield Trophy (1999); Unanimous All-American (1999); Consensus All-American (1998); 2× First-team All-ACC (1998, 1999); Second-team All-ACC (1997); Sugar Bowl MVP; Florida State Seminoles jersey No. 9 honored

Career NFL statistics
- Receiving yards: 2,991
- Receiving touchdowns: 18
- Rushing yards: 360
- Rushing touchdowns: 2
- Return yards: 555
- Return touchdowns: 2
- Stats at Pro Football Reference
- College Football Hall of Fame

Peter L. Warrick (born June 19, 1977) is an American former professional football player who was a wide receiver for six seasons in National Football League (NFL). He played college football for Florida State Seminoles where he was consensus All-American honors twice and won the 1999 National Championship with the team and was the named Sugar Bowl MVP. He was selected by the Cincinnati Bengals with the fourth overall pick in the 2000 NFL draft and played professionally for the Bengals and Seattle Seahawks of the NFL and the Bloomington Extreme of the Indoor Football League (IFL).

== Early life ==
Born in Bradenton, Florida, Warrick attended Southeast High School in Bradenton, where he competed in football, basketball and track. He played wide receiver as a junior and caught 36 passes for more than 600 yards and nine touchdowns. He played quarterback as a senior, rushing for 673 yards and 13 touchdowns while completing 49 of 96 passes for 1,109 yards and 13 touchdowns. He also returned four punts for touchdowns during his junior and senior seasons. Warrick served as team captain and led Southeast High to two consecutive state titles. He was a USA Today honorable mention, Parade All-American and first-team Class 5A all-state player. In basketball, he was named the player of the year for the state of Florida.

In track and field, Warrick was among the state's top performers in the sprinting and jumping events. He was the state runner-up in the long jump as a junior, at 7.16 meters. He won two state 6-A titles in the long jump as a senior, recording a personal-best jump of 7.25 meters. He ran a career-best time of 10.59 seconds in the 100 meters at the regional 5-A state meet. He was chosen to the all-area first team in the 100m and long-jump events.

Considered by some as the nation's best high school wide receiver, Warrick was, according to The National Recruiting Advisor, the No. 1 wide receiver and No. 7 player in the nation. He chose to attend Florida State University, declining scholarship offers from several other major programs.

== College career ==
Warrick played for coach Bobby Bowden's Florida State Seminoles football team from 1995 to 1999. He primarily played wide receiver and returned punts, leading Florida State to BCS National Championship Game appearances in 1998 and 1999. During the 1999 season, Florida State was the first team in college football history to rank first in the polls throughout the season and end with the number-one ranking in the country. Warrick was recognized as a consensus first-team All-American and the MVP of the 2000 Sugar Bowl with more than 160 yards receiving and three touchdowns, including a 59-yard punt return. He finished his college career with totals of 207 receptions for 3,517 yards and 32 touchdowns, 72 punt returns for 937 yards and two touchdowns, and 11 kick returns for 220 yards. Warrick graduated from Florida State with a bachelor of science degree in political science in 1999.

On January 14, 2026, Warrick was inducted into the College Football Hall of Fame.

=== Dillard's department-store incident ===
In July 1998, Warrick was charged with disorderly conduct and resisting arrest, but the charges were later dropped.

On September 29, 1999, during his senior season at Florida State, Warrick and teammate Laveranues Coles went to Dillard's in the Tallahassee Mall and bought $412.38 worth of clothing for $21.40—a discount so large that it is considered shoplifting under Florida law. An off-duty officer witnessed the purchase through a surveillance camera. Warrick, Coles and the clerk, Rachel Myrtil, were arrested for grand theft. On October 22, Warrick pled guilty to misdemeanor petit theft. His sentence included 30 hours of community service, which he fulfilled by collecting trash in Tallahassee in 10-hour shifts.

At the 1999 rivalry game between the Florida Gators and Florida State, Gators fans brought Dillard's bags to Florida Field in order to mock Warrick. Florida State won the game, 30–23.

At the time of his arrest, Warrick was widely considered the frontrunner for the Heisman Trophy with 36 catches for 508 yards and four touchdowns during the season. Following the arrest, Florida State suspended Warrick for two games, as school rules prevented him from playing while criminal charges were pending. The two-game suspension, along with the negative publicity that he received in the national media, ended any chance for Warrick to be awarded the Heisman Trophy. At season's end, Warrick was not invited to the award presentation at the Downtown Athletic Club and finished sixth in the overall voting.

== Professional career ==
Pre-draft measurables
Height	Weight
5 ft 10 5/8 in (1.79 m)	194 lb (88 kg)
Values from NFL Combine

=== 2000 NFL draft ===
Although Warrick had been projected as the first overall pick in the 2000 NFL draft, a disappointing 40-yard dash time under adverse conditions during a workout hurt his standing. The Dillard's incident also lowered his stock for some NFL teams. However, he was selected fourth overall by the Cincinnati Bengals.

=== Cincinnati Bengals ===
In 2003, Warrick caught a career-high 79 passes for 819 yards and seven touchdowns while gaining 143 rushing yards and adding another 273 yards and a touchdown returning punts.

Warrick missed most of the 2004 season with an injury, and receiver T. J. Houshmandzadeh, a seventh-round pick in the 2001 draft, replaced him at the #2 receiver spot and had the best season of his career. Warrick was released by the Bengals before the start of the 2005 season.

=== Seattle Seahawks ===
Warrick signed with the Seattle Seahawks. In his first season with Seattle, Warrick was used infrequently in the starting lineup. He finished the season with 11 catches for 180 yards, one carry for five yards and six punt returns for 29 yards. However, for most of the postseason and in Super Bowl XL, Warrick served as the team's starting punt returner. His 12-yard punt return in the first quarter of the Super Bowl helped set up the Seahawks' first points of the game. He later had a 34-yard return that was negated by a penalty. He finished Super Bowl XL with four punt returns for 27 yards.

On September 2, 2006, Warrick was cut by the Seahawks after the preseason. The New York Giants gave him a workout on November 13, and the Bengals also did so later in the year, but both teams declined to offer him a contract.

=== Las Vegas Gladiators ===
On January 4, 2007, the Las Vegas Gladiators of the Arena Football League signed Warrick. Per club policy, terms of the deals were not disclosed. Warrick did not report after the AFL's first week, and he was placed on the "refused to report" list by the team. Warrick did not work out for any teams in 2007, although Miami, Carolina, Jacksonville and the New York Jets contacted Warrick's agent about potential workouts.

=== Montreal Alouettes ===
In May 2008, Warrick was signed by the Montreal Alouettes of the Canadian Football League. He was released on June 3.

=== Bloomington Extreme ===
In 2009, Warrick was signed by the Bloomington Extreme of the Indoor Football League. He only played for one season.

=== Cincinnati Commandos ===
In 2011, Warrick signed with the Cincinnati Commandos of the Continental Indoor Football League. He never played in a game for the Commandos.

== Career statistics ==
Legend
**Bold**	Career high

=== NFL ===
Year	Team	GP	Receiving						Rushing						Punt returns				
Year	Team	GP	Rec	Yds	Avg	Lng	TD	FD	Att	Yds	Avg	Lng	TD	FD	Ret	Yds	Lng	TD	FC
2000	CIN	16	51	592	11.6	46	4	33	16	148	**9.3**	**77**	**2**	**6**	7	123	**82**	**1**	1
2001	CIN	16	70	667	9.5	33	1	34	8	14	1.8	13	0	2	18	116	31	0	**10**
2002	CIN	15	53	606	11.4	37	6	26	8	22	2.8	11	0	1	4	14	10	0	0
2003	CIN	15	**79**	**819**	10.4	**77**	**7**	**48**	**18**	**157**	8.7	50	0	**6**	**25**	**273**	68	**1**	8
2004	CIN	4	11	127	11.5	30	0	6	2	14	7.0	8	0	0	—	—	—	—	—
2005	SEA	13	11	180	**16.4**	42	0	6	1	5	5.0	5	0	0	6	29	10	0	0
Career		79	275	2,991	10.9	77	18	153	53	360	6.8	77	2	15	60	555	82	2	19

=== College ===
Year	G	Receiving				Punt returns				Kick returns			
Year	G	Rec	Yards	Avg	TDs	Ret	Yards	Avg	TDs	Ret	Yards	Avg	TDs
1995	11	0	0	0	0	0	0	0	0	1	9	9.0	0
1996	11	22	467	**21.2**	4	10	114	**21.2**	0	**9**	**188**	20.9	0
1997	11	53	884	16.7	8	**29**	**388**	16.7	**1**	1	23	**23.0**	0
1998	12	61	**1,232**	20.2	**12**	15	208	20.2	0	0	0	0	0
1999	9	**71**	934	13.2	8	18	227	13.2	**1**	0	0	0	0
**College totals**		**207**	**3,517**	**17.0**	**32**	**72**	**937**	**13.0**	**2**	**11**	**220**	**20.0**	**0**

== Career highlights ==
=== 1998 ===
- NCAA Consensus All-American
- Associated Press first-team All-American
- Walter Camp Football Foundation first-team All-American
- The Sporting News first-team All-American
- Football Digest first-team All-American
- The Football News fecond-team All-American
- First-team All-ACC

=== 1999 ===
- NCAA Consensus All-American
- Walter Camp Football Foundation first-team All-American
- Football Writers Association of America first-team All-American
- The Football News first-team All-American
- The Sporting News first-team All-American
- Associated Press first-team All-American
- All-American Foundation first-team All-American
- American Football Coaches Association first-team All-American
- First-team All-ACC
