= Spearman baronets =

Aristocratic title

The Spearman Baronetcy, of Hanwell in the County of Middlesex, is a title in the Baronetage of the United Kingdom. It was created on 28 April 1840 for Alexander Spearman, who was Comptroller General of the Exchequer and Secretary to the Commissioners for the Reduction of the National Debt for many years. The second Baronet was High Sheriff of Glamorganshire for 1882. Sir Alexander Spearman, son of Commander Alexander Young Crawshay Mainwaring Spearman (1862–1915), half-brother of the second Baronet, was a Conservative politician: his grandson Alexander Spearman (born 1984) married Brazilian Princess Amelia of Orléans-Braganza, daughter of Prince Antônio of Orléans-Braganza, descendants of the former Brazilian imperial family.

== Spearman baronets, of Hanwell (1840) ==
- Sir Alexander Young Spearman, 1st Baronet (1793–1874)
- Sir Joseph Layton Elmes Spearman, 2nd Baronet (1857–1922)
- Sir Alexander Young Spearman, 3rd Baronet (1881–1959)
- Sir Alexander Bowyer Spearman, 4th Baronet (1917–1977)
- Sir Alexander Young Richard Mainwaring Spearman, 5th Baronet (born 1969)

The heir apparent to the baronetcy is Alexander Axel Spearman (born 1999), only son of the 5th Baronet.
