= John Spearman =

American iron manufacturer (1824–1911)

John J. Spearman (December 17, 1824 – May 31, 1911) was an American iron manufacturer, foremost among the iron manufacturers of his era, and for many years identified with the banking interests of Sharon, Pennsylvania.

== Early life ==
Born in Mc Kee’s Gap, Blair County, Pennsylvania on December 17, 1824, John Spearman was a son of Francis and Elizabeth (Ambrose) Spearman. His father, who ancestors were of English heritage, was born in Kent County, Maryland and was a miller. His mother was born near McConnellsburg, Pennsylvania. They came to Mercer, Pennsylvania in 1852, where the father died. The mother died at Middlesex and was buried in Mercer. This couple reared a family of eight children, of whom two were sons and six were daughters.

Educated in the common schools, John Spearman was, by the age of fourteen, employed as a clerk by David Puterbaugh, of Woodbury, Bedford County, Pennsylvania, a position he held for three years. From 1841 to 1847, he worked for Dr. Peter Shoenberger, a prominent iron manufacturer associated with Blai County's Rebecca furnace and Maria forge.

== Iron industry executive ==
From January 1847 to 1853, Spearman became the business manager of the Sharon furnace, which was operated at that time by Shoenberger, Agnew & Co. In 1853, he purchased the Mazeppa furnace, near Mercer, which he operated until 1859, when he accepted the position of manager of the Sharpsville furnace, where he stayed for three years.

In 1862, he began managing the iron business of James Wood & Sons, at Wheatland.The following year took, he became a partner in that business, which was renamed as James Wood, Sons & Co. He was employed there until August 1870.

Spearman moved to Sharon where, in 1872, he organized the Spearman Iron Company and built the Spearman furnaces at Sharpsville, and became general manager. This was a partnership concern up until 1895, when it was incorporated, and in 1901 the property was sold. Spearman retired from the iron industry, in which he had spent half a century.

Employed by the First National Bank of Sharon in 1868, he became that bank's second president, succeeding George Prather, who died in January 1872.

== Marriage and family ==
On March 12, 1851, John Spearman married Cordelia Breed, a daughter of Jabish Breed, of Sharon. They were the parents of: Celesta, who later married David Adams; Eva, who remained at home; Chloe, who later married W. D. McKeefrey; Francis, who died in 1896; and Benjamin, who resided in Grove City, Pennsylvania. Politically, Spearman was a Republican.

== Public recognition ==
During his long and successful business career, Spearman developed a reputation as a reliable man, a good citizen and an exemplar for younger men. An advanced Mason, he was also a charter member of Sharon Lodge No. 347, Independent Order of Odd Fellows.

== Death ==
One of the oldest residents of Mercer County, Pennsylvania during the early 1900s, Spearman died at his home in Sharon, Pennsylvania on May 31, 1911.
