= Mario Monds =

American football player (born 1976)

No. 93
- Position: Defensive tackle

Personal information
- Born: November 10, 1976 (age 49); Fort Pierce, Florida, U.S.
- Listed height: 6 ft 3 in (1.91 m)
- Listed weight: 325 lb (147 kg)

Career information
- High school: Westwood (Fort Pierce)
- College: Cincinnati
- NFL draft: 2001: 6th round, 186th overall pick

Career history
- Washington Redskins (2001)*; Cincinnati Bengals (2001–2002); → Barcelona Dragons (2002); New York Giants (2004)*; Miami Dolphins (2004); New England Patriots (2005)*
- * Offseason or practice squad member only

Career NFL statistics
- Games played: 7
- Tackles: 6
- Stats at Pro Football Reference

Mario A. Monds (born November 10, 1976) is an American former professional football player who was a defensive tackle in the National Football League (NFL) for the Cincinnati Bengals and Miami Dolphins. He played college football for the Cincinnati Bearcats and was selected by the Washington Redskins in the sixth round of the 2001 NFL draft. He is the son of Wonder Monds, a former defensive back for the San Francisco 49ers.
