= Al Roberts =

American football coach (born 1944)

Personal information
- Born: January 6, 1944 (age 82); Fresno, California

Career information
- High school: Merced (Merced, California)
- College: Puget Sound

Career history
- Mercer Island HS (WA) (1969–1972) Assistant coach; Garfield HS (WA) (1973–1976) Head coach; Washington (1977–1982) Running backs coach; Los Angeles Express (1983) Running backs coach; Houston Oilers (1984–1985) Running backs coach; Purdue (1986) Running backs coach; Wyoming (1987) Special teams coach; Philadelphia Eagles (1988–1990) Special teams coach; New York Jets (1991–1993) Special teams coach; Arizona Cardinals (1994–1995) Special teams coach; Washington (1996) Running backs coach; Cincinnati Bengals (1997–2002) Special teams coach; Garfield HS (WA) (2003–2006) Head coach; St. Louis Rams (2007–2008) Special teams coach; Florida Tuskers (2009–2010) Special teams coach & tight ends coach; O'Dea HS (WA) (2011–present) Special teams, running back & outside linebacker coach

Al Roberts (born January 6, 1944) is an American football coach. He serves as the special teams, running backs, and outside linebackers coach for the O'Dea High School in Seattle, Washington.

== Playing career ==
Roberts attended Merced High School in Merced, California and played college football at the University of Washington from 1964 to 1965, and the University of Puget Sound from 1967 to 1968. He holds a holds a Bachelor of Arts degree from Puget Sound.

== Coaching career ==
Roberts began his coaching career at Mercer Island High School from 1969 to 1972, then became the head coach at Garfield High School from 1973 to 1976. He was the running backs coach on Don James's staff at Washington from 1977 to 1982.

Roberts joined the Los Angeles Express of the United States Football League (USFL) in 1983 as running backs coach under head coach Hugh Campbell, and followed Campbell to the Houston Oilers in the same capacity from the 1984 and 1985 seasons. After one-year stints on the college staffs at Purdue University (1986) and the University of Wyoming (1987) as running backs and special teams coach, he joined Buddy Ryan with the Philadelphia Eagles in 1988. He served as the Eagles' special teams coach for three seasons. He held the same position with the New York Jets from 1991 to 1993 and the Arizona Cardinals from 1994 to 1995.

Roberts returned to Washington in 1996 as the running backs coach. From 1997 to 2002 he headed the special teams unit for the Cincinnati Bengals.

== Family ==
Roberts and his wife, Arvella, have two sons, Kali and Kyle, and a daughter, Genesis.
