= Brian Simmons =

American football player (born 1975)

No. 56, 51
- Position: Linebacker

Personal information
- Born: June 21, 1975 (age 51); New Bern, North Carolina, U.S.
- Listed height: 6 ft 3 in (1.91 m)
- Listed weight: 244 lb (111 kg)

Career information
- High school: New Bern
- College: North Carolina
- NFL draft: 1998: 1st round, 17th overall pick

Career history
- Cincinnati Bengals (1998–2006); New Orleans Saints (2007)

Awards and highlights
- Cincinnati Bengals 40th Anniversary Team; Consensus All-American (1997); Second-team All-American (1996); First-team All-ACC (1996); Second-team All-ACC (1997); North Carolina Tar Heels Jersey No. 41 honored

Career NFL statistics
- Total tackles: 753
- Sacks: 24
- Forced fumbles: 13
- Fumble recoveries: 9
- Interceptions: 11
- Defensive touchdowns: 3
- Stats at Pro Football Reference

Brian Eugene Simmons (born June 21, 1975) is an American former professional football player who was a linebacker for 10 seasons in the National Football League (NFL). He played college football for the University of North Carolina, and earned All-American honors. He was selected by the Cincinnati Bengals 17th overall in the 1998 NFL draft, and he played professionally for the Bengals and New Orleans Saints of the NFL.

== Early life ==
Simmons was born in New Bern, North Carolina. He attended New Bern High School, where he was a letterman in high school football, basketball, baseball, and track for the New Bern Bears.

== College career ==
Simmons attended the University of North Carolina at Chapel Hill, and played for the North Carolina Tar Heels football team from 1994 to 1997. As a senior in 1997, he was recognized as a consensus first-team All-American after receiving first-team honors from Football News, the Associated Press, and the Walter Camp Foundation.

== Professional career ==
=== Cincinnati Bengals ===
He was drafted in the first round of the 1998 NFL draft by the Bengals, for whom he played nine seasons. Simmons missed all but one game of the 2000 season because of injury.

In 2001, the Bengals started the season 1–0. They faced the Super Bowl champion Baltimore Ravens in their second game. Right before the halftime, the Ravens were driving down field. They were on the goal line, and threw into the end zone. Brian Simmons picked off the pass, which led to Cincinnati's 21–10 win.

In 2003, the 1-4 Bengals were down 0–7 against the Ravens. With the Ravens about to score again, Simmons sacked rookie quarterback Kyle Boller, which forced a fumble, and led to Jon Kitna's 45-yard touchdown pass on third down. The Bengals won 34–26. A week later, the Bengals were 2-4 and were protecting a 27–24 lead against the Seattle Seahawks in the last six minutes. Simmons deflected a Matt Hasselbeck pass at the Cincinnati 34, then deflected another at the 24, which was intercepted by cornerback Jeff Burris to win the game.

In 2004, for the home season opener, the Bengals were down against the Miami Dolphins 0–3 at halftime. Three minutes into the second half, Simmons intercepted an A. J. Feeley pass and took it 50 yards for the Bengals' only score of the game. It allowed Carson Palmer to get rolling and drive downfield to set up Shayne Graham's game-winning field goal.

On February 28, 2007, Simmons was released from the Bengals.

=== New Orleans Saints ===
On March 6, 2007, he signed with the Saints. . On March 1, 2008, the Saints released Simmons after the acquisition of Jonathan Vilma.

=== Post career ===
On June 1, 2009, Simmons was named the Northeast regional scout for the Jacksonville Jaguars.

Simmons served as the color analyst for the Tar Heel Sports Network football broadcasts and was also the head football coach at Windermere Prep until January 2024, when he accepted an advisory role on the staff of Mack Brown at his alma mater, UNC.

== NFL career statistics ==
Legend
	Led the league
**Bold**	Career high

=== Regular season ===
Year	Team	Games		Tackles				Interceptions				Fumbles			
Year	Team	GP	GS	Comb	Solo	Ast	Sck	Int	Yds	TD	Lng	FF	FR	Yds	TD
1998	CIN	14	12	78	62	16	3.0	1	18	0	18	2	1	22	0
1999	CIN	16	16	**114**	**92**	22	3.0	0	0	0	0	0	1	0	0
2000	CIN	1	1	9	7	2	1.0	0	0	0	0	0	0	0	0
2001	CIN	16	16	84	52	**32**	**6.5**	1	5	0	5	2	1	**56**	**1**
2002	CIN	16	15	86	65	21	3.0	1	51	**1**	**51**	0	0	0	0
2003	CIN	16	16	103	72	31	1.5	**2**	14	0	13	2	**4**	13	0
2004	CIN	15	15	107	76	31	1.0	**2**	**61**	**1**	50	**3**	1	18	0
2005	CIN	16	16	84	52	**32**	4.0	**2**	15	0	16	**3**	0	0	0
2006	CIN	11	8	61	34	27	0.0	**2**	5	0	5	1	1	0	0
2007	NOR	16	3	27	17	10	1.0	0	0	0	0	0	0	0	0
		137	118	753	529	224	24.0	11	169	2	51	13	9	109	1

=== Playoffs ===
Year	Team	Games		Tackles				Interceptions				Fumbles			
Year	Team	GP	GS	Comb	Solo	Ast	Sck	Int	Yds	TD	Lng	FF	FR	Yds	TD
2005	CIN	1	1	4	3	1	0.0	0	0	0	0	0	0	0	0
		1	1	4	3	1	0.0	0	0	0	0	0	0	0	0
