= Matt O'Dwyer =

American football player (born 1972)

No. 70, 72
- Position: Guard

Personal information
- Born: September 1, 1972 (age 54); Lincolnshire, Illinois, U.S.
- Listed height: 6 ft 4 in (1.93 m)
- Listed weight: 315 lb (143 kg)

Career information
- High school: Adlai E. Stevenson
- College: Northwestern
- NFL draft: 1995: 2nd round, 33rd overall pick

Career history
- New York Jets (1995–1998); Cincinnati Bengals (1999–2003); Tampa Bay Buccaneers (2004); Green Bay Packers (2005)*
- * Offseason or practice squad member only

Awards and highlights
- 2× Second-team All-Big Ten (1993, 1994)

Career NFL statistics
- Games played: 122
- Games started: 105
- Fumble recoveries: 3
- Stats at Pro Football Reference

Matt O'Dwyer (born September 1, 1972) is an American former professional football player who was a guard who played in the National Football League (NFL) from 1995 to 2005. He played college football for the Northwestern Wildcats and in the NFL for the New York Jets (1995–1998), the Cincinnati Bengals (1999–2003), and the Tampa Bay Buccaneers (2004). He blocked on lines that produced a 1,000-yard rusher in seven of his 10 NFL seasons (Adrian Murrell 1996–1997, Curtis Martin 1998 and Corey Dillon 1999–2002). He also helped Dillon to break Walter Payton's single-game NFL record, a 278-yard performance vs. Denver, October 22, 2000 (since surpassed by Jamal Lewis in 2003 and Adrian Peterson in 2007).

Selected by the Jets as the first pick in the second round (33rd overall) of the 1995 NFL draft, O'Dwyer started 64 consecutive games at guard for the Jets (1996–1998) and Bengals (1999). In 2002, he was Cincinnati's only player on the field for every snap. Overall, O'Dwyer played 122 regular season games (105 starts), as well as two postseason starts, both in 1998 when the Jets nearly advanced to Super Bowl XXXIII. O'Dwyer was known for his tough style of play; he was one of the most penalized players in the NFL in 1997. After playing for the Buccaneers in 2004, O'Dwyer was signed by the Green Bay Packers in 2005, but he was cut at the beginning of the season. He retired from the NFL on September 1, 2006. He lives in Tampa Bay & Chicago.

O'Dwyer appeared in the Jon Favreau & Vince Vaughn movie Made with fellow NFL player Jason Fabini & future The Sopranos star Federico Castelluccio as doormen.
