= Chris Edmonds =

American football player (born 1978)

No. 87, 41
- Positions: End, Fullback

Personal information
- Born: January 1, 1978 (age 48); Newark, New Jersey, U.S.
- Listed height: 6 ft 3 in (1.91 m)
- Listed weight: 250 lb (113 kg)

Career information
- High school: Woodland Hills (PA)
- College: West Virginia (1998-2000)
- NFL draft: 2001: undrafted

Career history
- Cincinnati Bengals (2001–2003); Frankfurt Galaxy (2004)

Career NFL statistics
- Tackles: 7
- Stats at Pro Football Reference

Chris Edmonds (born January 1, 1978) is a former end and fullback in the National Football League (NFL). He played for the Cincinnati Bengals in 2002 and 2003. He signed as an undrafted free agent after the 2001 NFL draft after playing at the college level at West Virginia. In 2004, he played for the Frankfurt Galaxy in NFL Europe. He is a member of Omega Psi Phi fraternity.
