= Sean Brewer =

American football player (born 1977)

No. 88, 89
- Position: Tight end

Personal information
- Born: October 5, 1977 (age 49); Riverside, California, U.S.
- Listed height: 6 ft 4 in (1.93 m)
- Listed weight: 255 lb (116 kg)

Career information
- High school: Riverside Polytechnic
- College: San Jose State
- NFL draft: 2001: 3rd round, 66th overall pick

Career history
- Cincinnati Bengals (2001–2003); Atlanta Falcons (2003–2004); Washington Redskins (2004)*; San Diego Chargers (2005)*
- * Offseason or practice squad member only
- Stats at Pro Football Reference

Sean Eric Brewer (born October 5, 1977) is an American former professional football player who was a tight end. He was selected by the Cincinnati Bengals in the third round of the 2001 NFL draft. He played college football for the San Jose State Spartans.

Brewer was also a member of the Atlanta Falcons, Washington Redskins and San Diego Chargers. He is now a high school football coach for Martin Luther King High School in Riverside.

== Early life and college ==
Born in Riverside, California, Brewer graduated from Riverside Polytechnic High School. He first attended Riverside Junior College in 1997 and played one year of football there. In 1998, Brewer transferred to San Jose State University and majored in business management. From 1998 to 2000, Brewer played on the San Jose State Spartans football team.

== Professional career ==
Pre-draft measurables
Height	Weight	40-yard dash	10-yard split	20-yard split	20-yard shuttle	Three-cone drill	Vertical jump	Broad jump	Bench press
6 ft 4 in (1.93 m)	255 lb (116 kg)	4.73 s	1.67 s	2.74 s	4.18 s	7.37 s	36 in (0.91 m)	9 ft 9 in (2.97 m)	14 reps
Measures were taken at the NFL Scouting Combine.

=== Cincinnati Bengals ===
Brewer was drafted by the Cincinnati Bengals in the third round (66th overall) in the 2001 NFL draft. However shortly after being drafted by the Bengals, it was discovered that Brewer had a pack-a-day cigarette addiction. As a rookie in 2001, Brewer did not see any game action due to a pulled groin. Brewer sat out of the May 2002 mini-camp and voluntary workouts due to a slightly torn hamstring. He returned to practice on May 21, 2002.

The Bengals promoted Brewer to be the number-one tight end after waiving Tony McGee. Brewer was competing with Reggie Kelly, Matt Schobel, and Tony Stewart for the starting tight end position. Despite suffering from a bruised kneecap, Brewer played in the first three games of the 2002 season. In Week 3 on September 22, Brewer sprained his left knee. Projected to be out for 3 to 4 weeks, Brewer had knee surgery on October 28, 2002, and was placed on injured reserve one week later. After battling with Schobel for the starting job once again in 2003, he was waived on August 31, 2003.

=== Atlanta Falcons ===
One day after being waived by the Bengals, Brewer was claimed by the Atlanta Falcons. During the 2003 season he made nine appearances, mostly on special teams and goal line plays. On March 2, 2004, Brewer re-signed with the Falcons. He was waived on June 30, 2004.

=== Washington Redskins ===
On July 21, 2004, Brewer signed with the Washington Redskins. He was released on August 1, after the first day of training camp.

=== San Diego Chargers ===
Following his release from the Redskins, Brewer was invited to try out with the San Diego Chargers on May 4, 2005. The Chargers signed Brewer on May 13. Brewer missed some practices due to knee injury and was released on August 30, 2005.

== After football ==
In 2012, Brewer was strength and conditioning coach at Martin Luther King High School in Riverside.
