= Brandon Bennett =

American football player (born 1973)

No. 36
- Position: Running back

Personal information
- Born: February 3, 1973 (age 53); Greenville, South Carolina, U.S.
- Listed height: 5 ft 11 in (1.80 m)
- Listed weight: 220 lb (100 kg)

Career information
- High school: Riverside (Greer, South Carolina)
- College: South Carolina
- NFL draft: 1995: undrafted

Career history
- Cleveland Browns (1995)*; Chicago Bears (1995–1996); Miami Dolphins (1996); Cincinnati Bengals (1998–2003); Tampa Bay Buccaneers (2004)*; Carolina Panthers (2004)
- * Offseason or practice squad member only

Awards and highlights
- Second-team All-SEC (1993)

Career NFL statistics
- Rushing yards: 1,144
- Average: 3.7
- Touchdowns: 6
- Stats at Pro Football Reference

Brandon Bennett (born February 3, 1973) is an American former professional football player who was a running back in the National Football League (NFL) for the Cincinnati Bengals and Carolina Panthers. He played college football for the South Carolina Gamecocks. In high school, Bennett was on the track team as well as the basketball team.

In January 2017, he became the head football coach at St. Joseph's Catholic School in Greenville. He was previously employed as dean of students at Carolina High School and Academy in Greenville, South Carolina, and then served as the director of intramural sports at Southside Christian School in Simpsonville, South Carolina.
