= Armegis Spearman =

American football player and coach (born 1978)

No. 59
- Position: Linebacker

Personal information
- Born: April 5, 1978 (age 48); Oxford, Mississippi, U.S.

Career information
- College: Ole Miss
- NFL draft: 2000: undrafted

Career history

Playing
- Cincinnati Bengals (2000–2002); Houston Texans (2003); Washington Redskins (2004)*; Green Bay Packers (2004)*
- * Offseason or practice squad member only

Coaching
- Central Methodist (GA) (2012); Central Methodist (LB) (2013)

Awards and highlights
- 2× Second-team All-SEC (1998, 1999)

Career NFL statistics
- Games played: 22
- Tackles: 72
- Sacks: 1
- Stats at Pro Football Reference

Armegis Olemia Spearman (born April 5, 1978) is an American former professional football player who was a linebacker in the National Football League (NFL). He played college football for the Ole Miss Rebels.

== Early life and college career ==
Born in Oxford, Mississippi, Spearman grew up in Bruce, Mississippi and was an honorable mention USA Today All-American linebacker as a senior in 1995.

He played college football at the University of Mississippi where he was selected named to the Freshman All-SEC team in 1996. In both his junior and senior seasons in 1998 and 1999, he earned second-team All-SEC honors. After graduating with a B.A. in Business Administration, Spearman was invited to play in the Hula Bowl. However, he fell one vote short of being invited to the NFL Scouting Combine.

== Professional career ==
Spearman said that his agent was contacted by several teams during the draft and was told continually that teams were considering drafting him, including the Green Bay Packers and New England Patriots in the third round. In the end, though, Spearman went undrafted. He received interest from 21 different teams. Spearman had been so impressed by his meetings with Cincinnati Bengals linebacker coach Mark Duffner that he chose to sign with the Bengals on a two-year contract with a $10,000 signing bonus.

As soon as camp opened, Spearman impressed the Bengals coaching staff with his size, strength, and instincts. He began his rookie season playing primarily on special teams, but after an injury to starting middle linebacker Brian Simmons, Spearman was inserted into the starting lineup and had an outstanding season, logging 70 tackles. He was selected to the 2000 NFL All-Rookie Team.

Coming off such a promising rookie campaign, Spearman was poised to become a centerpiece in the Bengals defense. However, he suffered a torn pectoral muscle and missed the entire 2001 season. Again, in 2002, he was bitten by the injury bug. After overcoming a hamstring injury suffered in the preseason finale, Spearman appeared in only seven games when an ankle injury landed him back on Injured Reserve on November 1, 2002.

As a restricted free agent after the 2002 season, Spearman received an offer of $550,000 from the Packers. The Bengals elected to match the offer and retain him. However, Spearman struggled with injuries throughout training camp and was released by first year head coach Marvin Lewis. Two days later, Spearman was signed by the Houston Texans. However, he was released by the Texans on September 10, 2003.

On April 14, 2004, the Packers signed Spearman. He was released the day before training camp started, and his professional career was essentially over.

== Post-football career ==
In 2012, Spearman enrolled in Master of Education studies at Central Methodist University, an NAIA school in Fayette, Missouri, and served as a graduate assistant linebackers coach for Central Methodist Eagles football. The team promoted Spearman to full-time linebackers coach the following year.

Spearman transferred to the University of Mississippi in 2014 to pursue an M.A. in higher education with a concentration in student personnel and work as a mentor in the Student-Athlete Success Center. Spearman became a learning specialist in 2016 and completed his M.A. in 2018.
