= Victor Leyva =

Mexican gridiron football player (born 1977)

No. 77
- Position: Guard

Personal information
- Born: December 18, 1977 (age 48); Guanajuato, Mexico
- Listed height: 6 ft 4 in (1.93 m)
- Listed weight: 307 lb (139 kg)

Career information
- High school: Monache (Porterville, California, U.S.)
- College: Arizona State
- NFL draft: 2001: 5th round, 135th overall pick

Career history
- Cincinnati Bengals (2001–2003); Miami Dolphins (2005)*; New England Patriots (2005)*
- * Offseason or practice squad member only

Awards and highlights
- First-team All-Pac-10 (2000)

Career NFL statistics
- Games played: 10
- Stats at Pro Football Reference

Victor Samuel Leyva (born December 18, 1977) is a Mexican former professional American football guard. He was selected by the Cincinnati Bengals in the fifth round of the 2001 NFL draft. Levya's NFL career started in 2002 and ended in 2005 after playing for three years. He played college football at Arizona State, where he earned first-team All-Pac-10 honors as a senior in 2000.

Leyva played for the Miami Dolphins and New England Patriots in 2005 before retiring.
