= Artrell Hawkins =

American football player (born 1976)

No. 27, 25
- Positions: Cornerback, safety

Personal information
- Born: November 24, 1976 (age 49); Johnstown, Pennsylvania, U.S.
- Listed height: 5 ft 10 in (1.78 m)
- Listed weight: 195 lb (88 kg)

Career information
- High school: Bishop McCort (Johnstown)
- College: Cincinnati (1994–1997)
- NFL draft: 1998: 2nd round, 43rd overall pick

Career history
- Cincinnati Bengals (1998–2003); Carolina Panthers (2004); Washington Redskins (2005)*; New England Patriots (2005–2006); New York Jets (2008)*
- * Offseason or practice squad member only

Career NFL statistics
- Tackles: 509
- Sacks: 4
- Forced fumbles: 12
- Fumble recoveries: 7
- Interceptions: 11
- Defensive touchdowns: 1
- Stats at Pro Football Reference

Artrell Hawkins Jr. (born November 24, 1976) is an American former professional football player in the National Football League (NFL). He played college football for the Cincinnati Bearcats and was selected by the Cincinnati Bengals in the second round of the 1998 NFL draft.

Hawkins played cornerback for the Bengals, Carolina Panthers and later transitioned to safety for the New England Patriots. He finished his 10-year career as a member of the New York Jets prior to the 2008 season.

== Early life ==
Artrell Hawkins Jr. was born the son of Artrell Hawkins Sr. and Aletha (Haselrig-Jones) Hawkins on November 24, 1976. He attended Bishop McCort High School in Johnstown, Pennsylvania, where he was named conference offensive player of the year as a senior after rushing for a school record 26 touchdowns and 1,487 yards, including a single-game record 265 yards. He also lettered in basketball and baseball at Bishop McCort.

Hawkins' father, Artrell Hawkins Sr. was a three-year letterman at the University of Pittsburgh and was signed by the Pittsburgh Steelers as a rookie free agent in 1980.

Hawkins attended the University of Cincinnati, where he majored in business and lettered in football for four years (1994–1997) as a cornerback and kick returner under head coach Rick Minter. His senior year, the Bearcats went 8–4 and played in the Humanitarian Bowl, breaking the school's 47-year drought of not appearing in a bowl game. The Bearcats defeated Utah State University, 35–19.

== Professional career ==
Hawkins was selected by the Cincinnati Bengals in the second round of the 1998 NFL draft, where he played cornerback for six years. In his rookie year of 1998, he started in all 16 Bengals' games, recording 65 tackles, five assists, one sack and three interceptions.

In 1999, Hawkins played in 14 games (starting 13) and totaled 61 tackles and seven assists. In 2000, he played in all 16 games, starting six, and recorded 43 tackles and four assists.

In 2001, Hawkins rebounded and played in 14 games (starting 13), totaling 49 tackles, 10 assists, and three interceptions. In 2002, he started and played in 15 games, recording 69 tackles, seven assists, two sacks, and two interceptions, including a league-leading and team record 102-yard interception return for a touchdown on a pass by David Carr in a 38–3 Bengals' win over the Houston Texans. In 2003, his sixth and final season with the Bengals, he played in 14 games, starting nine, with 50 tackles, five assists, and one interception.

After that season he signed for 2004 with the Carolina Panthers, for whom he played 14 games (starting four) with 24 tackles, five assists and one interception.

For the 2005 season, Hawkins joined the New England Patriots, playing in five games (starting four) with 11 tackles, six assists and one sack. In 2006, he played in 14 games for the Patriots, starting 12 games and recording 54 tackles, 19 assists, and one interception. He was released by the Patriots during the summer of 2007.

After sitting out the 2007 season, Hawkins signed with the New York Jets in February, 2008. He announced his retirement on August 1, 2008, prior to the regular season.

His younger brother, Andrew Hawkins, retired from playing in the league in July 2017, after stints with the Bengals and Browns.

Since retiring, Hawkins has been a fixture on Cincinnati sportstalk radio, beginning as a University of Cincinnati sideline reporter and also various co-hosting and guest duties. Hawkins also is a weekly contributor to the Bengals Radio Network.

=== NFL statistics ===
Year	Team	Games	Tackles				Fumbles			Interceptions					
Year	Team	Games	Comb	Total	Ast	Sacks	FF	FR	Yds	Int	Yds	Avg	Lng	TD	PD
1998	CIN	16	70	65	5	1.0	2	1	0	3	21	7	12	0	18
1999	CIN	14	66	59	7	0.0	2	1	0	0	0	0	0	0	17
2000	CIN	16	48	42	6	0.0	1	1	0	0	0	0	0	0	9
2001	CIN	14	57	47	10	0.0	2	1	0	3	26	9	22	0	6
2002	CIN	15	75	68	7	2.0	1	2	0	2	102	51	102	1	6
2003	CIN	14	57	50	7	0.0	1	0	0	1	8	8	8	0	7
2004	CAR	14	26	21	5	0.0	3	0	0	1	9	9	9	0	5
2005	NE	5	17	11	6	1.0	0	0	0	0	0	0	0	0	0
2006	NE	14	73	54	19	0.0	2	1	0	1	0	0	0	0	4
Career		122	489	417	72	4.0	14	7	0	11	166	15	102	1	72
