= Maurice Black (disambiguation) =

Maurice Black may refer to:

- Maurice Black (Australian politician) (1835–1899), (Maurice Hume Black) member of the Queensland Legislative Assembly
- Maurice Black (Mississippi politician) (1915–2000), member of the Mississippi House of Representatives
- Maurice Black (1891–1938), American film actor
- Maurice M. Black (1918–1996), American pathologist, expert on breast cancer
