= Katie Blackburn =

American sports executive and lawyer (born 1965)

Cincinnati Bengals
- Title: Executive vice president

Personal information
- Born: September 25, 1965 (age 61)

Career information
- College: Dartmouth

Career history
- Cincinnati Bengals (2001–present) Executive vice president

Katherine Blackburn (née Brown; born September 25, 1965) is an American football executive who is the executive vice president of the Cincinnati Bengals of the National Football League.

== Early life ==
Blackburn played women's ice hockey at Dartmouth College. After graduating from University of Cincinnati College of Law, she worked for a Cincinnati law firm.

== Personal life ==
Blackburn is married to Troy Blackburn, who is the Bengals' vice president and they have two daughters together. She is the daughter of Bengals owner Mike Brown and the granddaughter of Bengals co-founder and first coach Paul Brown.
