= Mike Brown (American football executive) =

American businessman and sports team owner (born 1935)

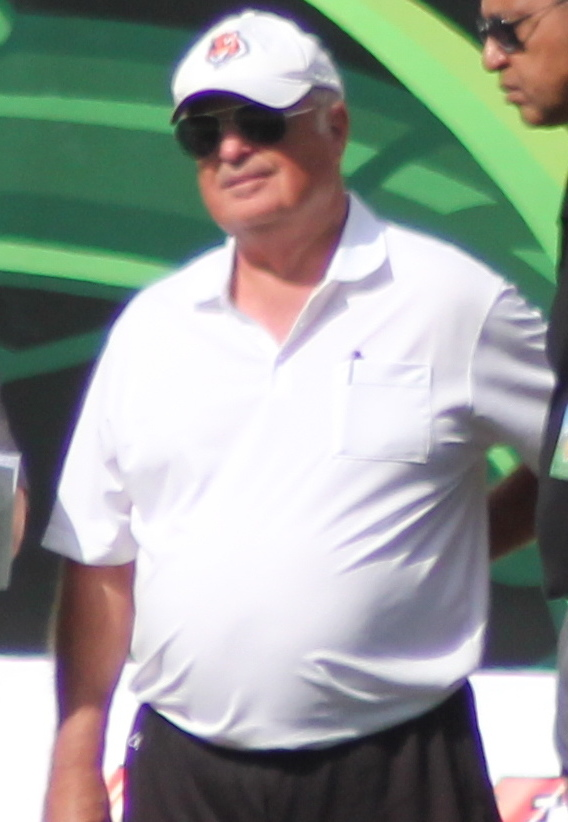
- Brown on the field during training camp in 2012

Cincinnati Bengals
- Title: Owner; President

Personal information
- Born: August 10, 1935 (age 91); Massillon, Ohio, U.S.

Career information
- Position: Quarterback
- College: Dartmouth

Career history
- Cincinnati Bengals (1968–1990) Assistant general manager; Cincinnati Bengals (1991–present) Owner
- Executive profile at Pro Football Reference

Michael Brown (born August 10, 1935) is an American professional football executive who is the owner of the Cincinnati Bengals in the National Football League (NFL). The son of Bengals co-founder Paul Brown, he joined the Bengals upon their founding in 1968, serving as the assistant general manager. He assumed ownership in 1991 after his father's death.

== Early life ==
Brown is the only living son of Paul Brown. His brother, Pete, was the senior vice-president of Bengals' player personnel until his death in 2017. His older brother, Robin, died of cancer in 1978.

Brown graduated from Dartmouth College in 1957, where he played quarterback for their football team, and from Harvard Law School in 1960. He played nine games for the Big Green in 1956. In an unusual meeting between future sports owners, eventual New York Yankees owner George Steinbrenner hired him to a summer job as a deck hand for Kinsman Marine Transit Company.

Brown eventually followed his father into football management. Paul Brown founded the Bengals, then an American Football League (AFL) team, in 1968. (This was several years after Paul Brown was dismissed as Cleveland Browns head coach in a well-publicized falling out with Art Modell.) He began his executive duties with the Bengals as assistant general manager. Along with personnel decisions, he was a spokesman for the team on issues of league rules and team policy.

== Taking over the team ==
Brown assumed ownership responsibilities upon his father's death in August 1991 and has remained in the ownership position since. His first significant move as owner was to fire popular coach Sam Wyche after the 1991 season (although he originally claimed that Wyche resigned). Days later, Brown hired Dave Shula to be head coach, making Shula (at the time) the second youngest NFL head coach in history and making Dave and Don Shula the first father-son to lead different NFL teams in the same year. Going into 1993, Brown sought to negotiate a new lease with Cincinnati to keep the Bengals in the city.

=== Construction of a new stadium deal ===
Initially, Brown rejected advances from other cities to discuss moving the team. By 1995, he argued that Riverfront Stadium's small seating capacity and lack of luxury boxes was hindering the Bengals' success.

In 1995, he announced that Cincinnati had breached its lease agreement when it was late by one week in paying $167,000 in concession receipts. He threatened to move the team to Baltimore if Cincinnati or Hamilton County would not fund a new stadium. The leverage of this threat proved successful as Cincinnati's City Council and the Hamilton County Commissioners opted to fund the new Paul Brown Stadium with a proposed county sales tax increase, which needed voter approval. (Modell eventually, and controversially, moved the Browns to Baltimore and renamed it to the Ravens, but a new Cleveland team resumed the Browns' history.) In 1996, Hamilton County voters passed a one-half percent sales tax increase to fund the building of a new facility for the Bengals and a second new facility for the Major League Baseball Cincinnati Reds. The Bengals filed suit against the county for the right to manage it in 2000. County commissioners agreed to let a Bengals' subsidiary run the stadium, and it opened later that year.

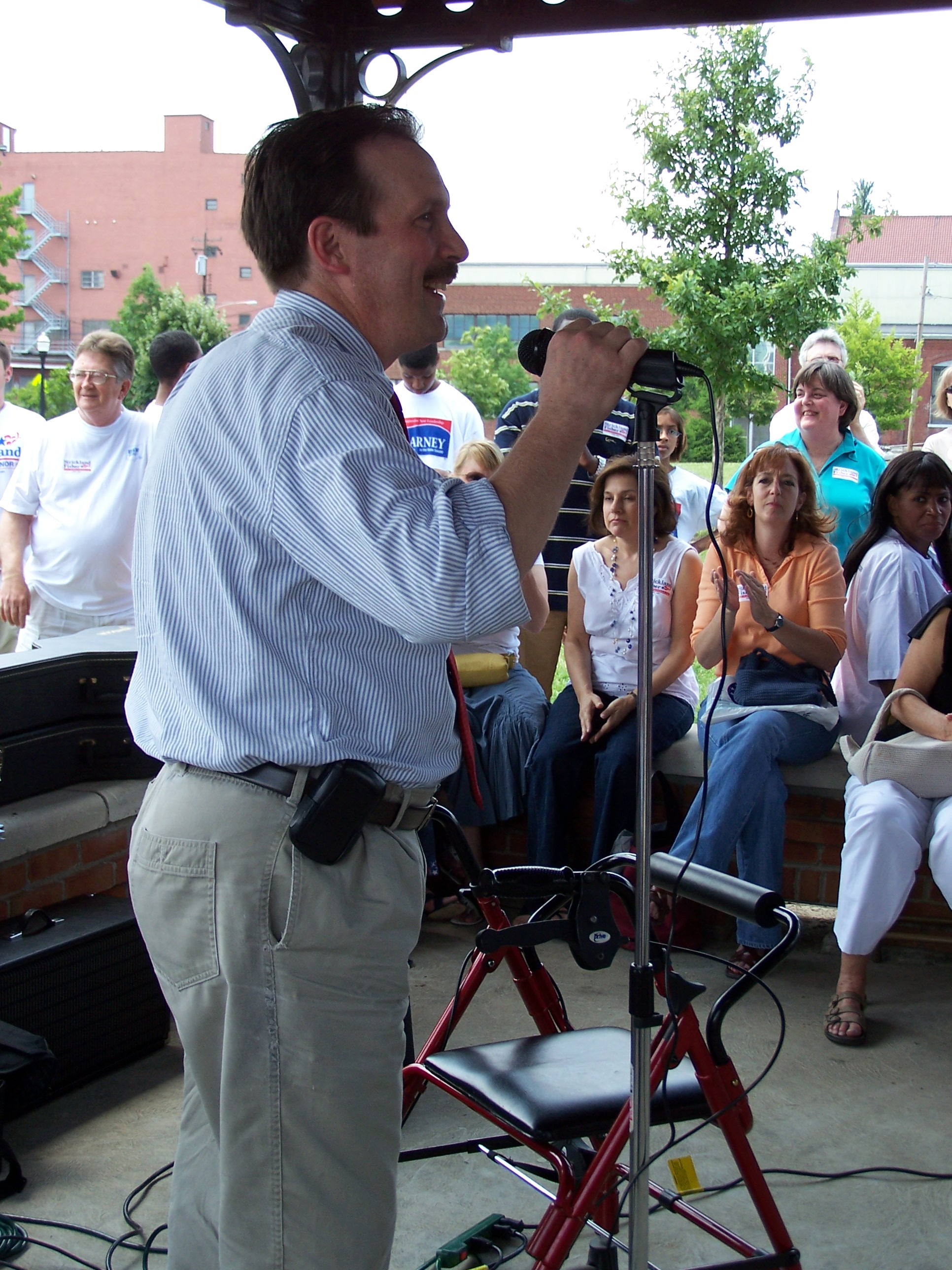
Todd Portune unseated future Bengals employee Bob Bedinghaus for the role of Hamilton County Commissioner

In 2007, Hamilton County Commissioner Todd Portune (a former Cincinnati City Council member, though not Commissioner at the time the parties executed the lease), filed a lawsuit in federal district court against the NFL, the Bengals and the other 31 NFL teams. Portune felt, among other things, that published revenues from 1995 to 1999 contradicted Brown's claims of financial distress. The Hamilton County Board of Commissioners eventually was substituted as the plaintiff in the case. Fans supporting Portune cited what they felt was the broken promise that the Bengals would "be more competitive" with a new stadium. The Bengals have had only eight winning seasons out of 22 since the stadium opened, with five of those seasons occurring from 2011 to 2015.

Rick Eckstein, co-author of "Public Dollars, Private Stadiums," described the Hamilton County arrangement as "the single most lopsided stadium deal since 1993" and questioned Bob Bedinghaus' role with the team after having been County Commissioner when the deal was reached. A 2008 Forbes survey suggested the team's rankings in direct revenues had dropped since the stadium's construction (placing the team 21st in total value at the time at $941 million).

The organization's lease is due to expire in 2026. In 2020, Hamilton County and the Bengals agreed to split costs on an architectural needs assessment of the stadium.

=== On-the-field struggles ===
Since Brown became owner, the team has eight winning seasons out of 30, a winning percentage of .418 (199–278–4) in the regular season, and no playoff wins in seven appearances from 1991 to 2020. In 2008, the Bengals set a record for the most games needed under one specific owner to attain 100 wins (288). In 2010, the team set a record for the fewest games needed to lose 200 (both considering and not considering playoffs) under one specific owner (314).

The Bengals hold a number of distinctions for the time frame of Brown's ownership: It is the only team with three nine-game-or-more losing streaks. It also holds six of the twenty-five 0-6 starts (24%) and four of the thirteen 0-8 starts (31%) in that time. The Bengals have gone winless in October nine different times in twenty-two years under five different head coaches (Sam Wyche, the first under his ownership, was originally hired by his father).

The franchise's winless playoff record from 1991 to 2020 was the longest active drought in the four major North American sports. One of the few successful coaches during Brown's tenure was Marvin Lewis, who was his first to have winning seasons, playoff appearances, division titles, and an overall winning record at 131-129-3 (.504). All seven of the Bengals postseason appearances with Lewis, however, ended in first-round losses.

Zac Taylor, Lewis' successor, was the first head coach under Brown to win a playoff game, which he achieved in 2021. The team also won the franchise's first road playoff game and advanced to Super Bowl LVI, although they lost to the Los Angeles Rams.

In 2009, Yahoo Sports ranked Brown as the second worst owner in the NFL. In 2015, Rolling Stone ranked Mike Brown as the 9th worst sports owner.

== Philosophy ==
During Marvin Lewis' tenure as head coach, Brown began to cede more of the day-to-day control over football matters to a committee composed of Lewis, executive vice president Katie Blackburn (Brown's daughter), and several other members of the Brown family. This preceded a five-year run of playoff appearances (2011–2015).

=== Tolerance of off field conduct ===
In the mid-to-late 2000s, the Bengals were involved in a series of disciplinary measures with a variety of players. In 2005, the Bengals drafted Chris Henry and Odell Thurman, each considered exceptionally talented but possible disciplinary hazards during their college careers. The following year, they were among nine Bengals players arrested for various offenses. Brown cut several "problem players" in 2008 including Henry and Thurman, but re-signed Henry later that year. This came after five arrests of Henry and Brown's statement earlier in the year that Henry's "conduct could no longer be tolerated." One fan protested by purchasing an electronic billboard along the Cincinnati interstate reading "CHRIS HENRY AGAIN? ARE YOU SERIOUS?" Henry died during a domestic dispute on December 17, 2009. Commenting on his death, Brown defended his decision to re-sign Henry, noting that "We knew him in a different way than his public persona." Posthumously, it was discovered that Henry was suffering from a progressive degenerative brain disease known as chronic traumatic encephalopathy, or CTE. According to a West Virginia University research study, the CTE may have contributed to Henry's troubled behavior and, ultimately, his death.

Later in 2008, the Bengals signed running back Cedric Benson, whom the Chicago Bears had waived, in part, due to his off-field activities. In 2009, the team added Larry Johnson to provide depth for the position after the Kansas City Chiefs released him for "detrimental conduct." Johnson had also experienced recent legal difficulties. Benson was among 2009's leading NFL rushers, while Johnson saw limited action.

Brown also signed free agent Adam "Pacman" Jones during the 2010 offseason despite Jones' legal history while a member of the Tennessee Titans and Dallas Cowboys, including a season-long ban in 2007 due to a shooting in Las Vegas. He also signed undrafted free agent Vontaze Burfict in the 2012 offseason despite his legal history in college and high number of flagrant fouls while at Arizona State. Both Jones and Burfict in particular drew ire from fans during the 2015 Wild Card Game against the Pittsburgh Steelers, in which Burfict committed a personal foul on Antonio Brown, which left him concussed, and Jones got into an altercation with Steelers linebacker coach Joey Porter during the play. Both plays drew 15-yard penalties and ultimately resulted in an 18-16 loss in that game.

In recent years, Brown claims to have rethought this approach. Talking about the team's second appearance on Hard Knocks, Brown stated, "We have a different team now than we had a few years ago. We want the public to see them. We think they're good people. We think the public will be taken by them, will like them. It gives us a boost."

Brown has commented that the league's current attitude towards discipline is a change from a past "boys will be boys" attitude. Brown's father welcomed tailback Stanley Wilson back to the Bengals in 1988 after two drug suspensions. Wilson relapsed the night before Super Bowl XXIII and his absence in short-yardage situations affected the Bengals' efforts in one of the tightest Super Bowl games in NFL history that Cincinnati ultimately lost.

=== Loyalty issues ===
Brown is historically reluctant to fire personnel after multiple losing seasons. His first hire as head coach, David Shula, lost fifty games faster than any NFL coach in history (69 games); Shula was hired over Kansas City Chiefs defensive coordinator Bill Cowher, presumably due to Brown seeing similarities with himself and Shula in the same manner that their respective fathers (Don Shula and Paul Brown) overshadow them in many aspects. Cowher would take the head coaching position with the rival Pittsburgh Steelers that same offseason and would go on to have a 22–9 career record against the Bengals, the most wins he would have against any team as a head coach, including an 8–1 record against Shula. Cowher also beat the Bengals in the 2005 AFC Wild Card Game as well and went on to win a Super Bowl title that season. Shula's successor, Bruce Coslet, resigned with a 21–39 record in 2000; Brown had yet to fire him.

Cincinnati's first winning seasons and postseason appearances during Brown's ownership came under head coach Marvin Lewis, who obtained a 131–122–3 regular season record with the team and helped the Bengals return to competitiveness. However, Brown was criticized for continuing to retain Lewis after the Bengals lost all seven of the playoff games they appeared in during Lewis' tenure. Following five consecutive opening-round postseason losses from 2011 to 2015, an NFL first, and back-to-back losing seasons in 2016 and 2017, Lewis received a two-year contract extension, which received harsh criticism from the media and fans. When Brown and Lewis mutually parted ways in 2018, Lewis' 16-year tenure became the most of an NFL head coach to not win a playoff game as well as the most playoff losses without a win in NFL history.

Brown also values his family's connection with the franchise; evident in his choosing to name Paul Brown Stadium after his father rather than to sell corporate naming rights for it. Daughter Katie Blackburn is the executive president of the team and her husband Troy is a VP with additional family members among the front office staff. From 1994 to 2000, the Bengals paid out over $50 million to the Brown family members of Bengals staff in salaries.

Former Bengals receiver Cris Collinsworth argues Brown's loyalty played a role in a decision to not persuade Boomer Esiason out of retiring despite a productive 1997 season. Esiason became a color analyst on ABC's Monday Night Football. Collinsworth suggested Brown "thought he was doing the right thing by Boomer" and did not want to cost him the MNF job. Collinsworth contrasted this attitude to other NFL owners, like the Dallas Cowboys' Jerry Jones, whom Collinsworth felt "would have flown Boomer down to the Bahamas on his personal jet, offered to kiss his ring and signed him right there."

=== Scouting ===
Brown employs a very small scouting staff. A 2008 comparison between the Bengals' scouting department and five AFC teams with a .540+ winning percentage since 1991 showed the winning teams employing five or more scouts whereas the Bengals employed only one. Since then, the Bengals have added two additional scouts (Marvin Lewis originally claimed when hired that Brown assured him of a retooled scouting staff).

=== Emphasis on the quarterback ===
Brown has publicized his belief that a "bell cow" quarterback is a necessity in turning a team into a winner. In a 1999 interview, he remarked "If you don't have a productive quarterback, you won't go anywhere...I know it doesn't seem that simple, but it is." Comparing quarterbacks to other positions on a football team, Brown has said "He's the hub of the wheel...like a queen on a chessboard. These other guys are like rooks or bishops or other pieces that are not quite as valuable. Some are more valuable than others. That's just a fact."

Brown turned down then-Saints coach Mike Ditka's offer of nine draft picks for one in the 1999 NFL draft against then-coach Coslet's advice. Coslet wanted as many draft picks as possible to help the Bengals' defense. Instead, Brown overruled Coslet and selected University of Oregon quarterback Akili Smith. Smith only played 22 games in his NFL career and is generally regarded as a draft bust. Coslet later regretted that he "didn't insist hard enough" in trying to persuade Brown to accept the Saints' offer.

Before the 1992 draft, press reports stressed the Bengals' need for either a cornerback or defensive lineman. Brown himself had been quoted the day before the draft as stating "we would dearly love to get a top defensive lineman, they're at a premium, and it's less true of other positions." Instead, the Bengals selected Houston quarterback David Klingler. Then Bengals quarterback Boomer Esiason and strong-safety David Fulcher both openly questioned the move the next day, arguing the team needed help on defense. Klingler later became regarded as a bust. Esiason has since revealed that he had actually demanded a trade at the end of the 1991 season, which may have influenced Brown to select Klingler (Esiason was traded to the New York Jets in 1993).

Brown placed a great deal of responsibility on Carson Palmer, calling him the Bengals' "lead dog" and stating "as he goes, we go." Palmer holds a number of team records, three Pro Bowl selections, and he helped Cincinnati win 2 AFC North Division Championships. The Bengals were 46-51 (.474) with Palmer as starter, including 0-2 in the playoffs. Palmer threatened retirement from football if the Bengals did not trade him during the 2011 offseason. Brown insisted that he wouldn't "reward" Palmer's demands, arguing that Palmer made a commitment to the organization when he received a contract extension. Brown released Carson's younger brother, Jordan from the team on August 27, 2011. On October 18, 2011, the Bengals finally traded Carson to the Oakland Raiders for a 2012 first round draft pick and a conditional second round 2013 pick if Oakland made it to the AFC Championship game in 2011 or 2012 (which they did not). Palmer later said in the NFL Network documentary series A Football Life that after the 2010 season, he told Brown that the Bengals needed to modernize and hire a general manager and that he and Brown got into a heated argument over it. He said that Brown 'is a very, very, very stubborn man'.

Andy Dalton was taken in the 2011 NFL draft and became the first quarterback in franchise history to lead the team to the playoffs five years in a row, although the Bengals were eliminated in the first round each year. Dalton did not play in what became the fifth consecutive loss due to injury. After returning from injury, Dalton struggled mightily from 2016 to 2019 compared to the previous 5 seasons and was eventually cut after the 2019 season.

The Bengals drafted Joe Burrow with the first overall pick in the 2020 Draft. In 2021, Burrow led the Bengals to their first playoff win since 1990 and has led them to back-to-back AFC Championship Games in 2021 and 2022, a team first, and one Super Bowl berth.

=== "Carl Pickens Clause" ===
In 1998, the Bengals cut punter Lee Johnson. Brown attempted to fine Johnson after cutting him for "conduct detrimental to the team" in relation to comments Johnson had made about the organization and the 1998 season. A reporter asked Johnson after a Bengals loss "if you were a fan, would you have come here today?" to which Johnson replied "No, no way...why would you? You're saying (losing) is OK. I guess if you've got nothing else to do. I'd sell my tickets." This fine resulted in a dispute with the NFL players union, whose counsel remarked "A fine is a disciplinary measure, you discipline someone to try and make sure they're a better employee in the future. How can you do that if you've fired them?"

In 2000, the Bengals instituted a "loyalty clause," which allows the Bengals to deny various bonuses to players depending on the remarks they make about the Bengals. The ability to enact such a clause appears justified under the collective bargaining agreement which states an NFL team can fine a player one week's salary and suspend him without pay for up to four weeks for any action the club considers detrimental to the team. Brown responded that the clause would only be enacted under extreme circumstances. He wrote an editorial for the Cincinnati Enquirer, citing team cohesion as his main motivation for the clause.

It is often dubbed the "Carl Pickens Clause," stemming from the 2000 offseason. Brown renewed Bruce Coslet's contract despite his 21–36 Bengals record. Pickens responded, "I don't understand it. We're trying to win; we're trying to turn this thing around out there. And they bring (Coslet) back." Pickens finished his career with the Tennessee Titans.

Over the years since the clause, Bengals players have commented on a negative atmosphere within the organization, notably Takeo Spikes, Jeff Blake, and Jon Kitna.

The most vocal critic of the Bengals since the clause was instituted was Corey Dillon. In 2001, after becoming the sixth player in NFL history to rush for 1,000 yards or more in five consecutive seasons, he remarked "at the end of the season, what do I have to feel good about? Nothing at all. It's not cool." After a fifth losing season with the team in 2002, he remarked "I'm tired of it, six years of this B.S. I ain't lying to you. I'm sick of this crap, period." Dillon demanded a trade at the end of the 2003 season after throwing most of his gear to the fans during the last home game of the season. He went on to win a Super Bowl with the New England Patriots in the following season.

=== Frugality ===
Warren Sapp went to the Oakland Raiders after the Bengals appeared to have signed him

In 1994, agent Leigh Steinberg described Brown as "in a lonely fight for economic rationality in the NFL" and "a Don Quixote-type figure pushing back the forces of salary madness." In the 2000s, Brown proved reluctant to finish free agent signings or trades. Warren Sapp (in 2004), Shaun Rogers (in 2008), and Johnathan Joseph (in 2011) being notable examples.

Agent Drew Rosenhaus described it as a "matter of hours" before the Bengals would sign Sapp, only a day before the Raiders signed him. Sapp accused the Bengals of "playing with the money" on the original deal they offered him, deferring more money to incentives rather than in guarantees. The Associated Press reported a completed trade between Cincinnati and the Detroit Lions on February 29, 2008, for Rogers. However, the trade fell through and the next day, it was confirmed that the Lions instead traded Rogers to the Cleveland Browns.

Former Bengals players and beat writers have also remarked on other spendthrift aspects of the organization as compared to other NFL franchises, such as not supplying sports drinks and providing undersized towels or used equipment for the players.

== Criticism ==
Organizers from MikeBrownSucks organized a boycott of a December 2001 regular season game and fans visiting this site as well as another site, SaveTheBengals.com, paid for planes to fly a banner in the Cincinnati area calling for Brown's resignation.

Who Dey Revolution (WDR) has staged "Project Mayhem" since 2008 in an effort to persuade Brown to make changes to the Bengals. These steps ranged from calling the Bengals "JERK line" to report Brown's behavior as abusive to purchasing billboards displaying a request for a general manager to merchandise and ticket donations/boycotts and letter-writing campaigns. The website's purchase and distribution of 1000 urinal cakes at a Bengals' home game advertised Brown's lifetime regular season record of 98–186–1 to that point.

WDR published a comic strip titled "The Lost Generation", presenting Mike Brown in a Charlie Brownesque caricature, presumably to correlate Brown's track record to the famous cartoon character's history of hard luck and failure.

"All My Bengals" was a popular satirical radio skit, hosted by 700 WLW Radio personality Gary Burbank.

Despite these protests, the Bengals have remained popular within Cincinnati. A November 21, 2010, game vs. the Buffalo Bills marked the first time since November 2003 that network affiliates and DirecTV were legally obliged to "black out" the Bengals game within a 75-mile (121 km) radius of Paul Brown Stadium for lack of ticket sales. The remaining home games against the New Orleans Saints, Cleveland Browns, and San Diego Chargers were also blacked out. Prior to this, the team sold out 57 straight games, a club record.

=== Response ===
Several people cast Brown sympathetically in response to fan and media criticism. After a surprising upset of the Kansas City Chiefs in 2003, Marvin Lewis tearfully awarded the game ball to Brown and told his players "he has put up with so much for you guys." Some former Bengals dismiss notions that Brown is unconcerned with winning. Boomer Esiason, now a CBS analyst, refers to Brown as a "nice man" who is simply over his head running the team. In 1998 interviews, Cris Collinsworth and Bengals radio analyst Dave Lapham also rejected notions that Brown did not care about winning. Collinsworth remarked "I don't think anybody could be suffering more over this than Mike is."

== Personal life ==
Brown is married to Nancy. He has been considered reclusive as very little is known about his personal life. He has at least two children. His daughter, Katie Blackburn, serves as the Bengals' executive vice president. She is also the first woman to be a chief contract negotiator in the NFL.

Brown has admitted to an affinity for Ohio State football players. His father Paul coached the Buckeyes to their first national championship in 1942.

Brown's net worth was estimated at $2.1 billion by Forbes in 2022.

Following the death of Bears owner Virginia Halas McCaskey in February 2025, Brown became the oldest owner in the NFL.

== Philanthropy ==
In 2008, Brown and the Bengals donated $250,000 to assist the Cincinnati Park Board in paying for Cincinnati Riverfront Park. He has contributed to a number of Republican campaigns, including several Presidential bids.

In 2017, Brown and his family received the Pillar Award for Community Service's Kent Clapp CEO Leadership Award. The award recognizes a top executive for his or her passion toward philanthropy and honors the late Kent Clapp, CEO of Medical Mutual, who died in a 2008 plane crash.
