= Flora, Mississippi =

- Town
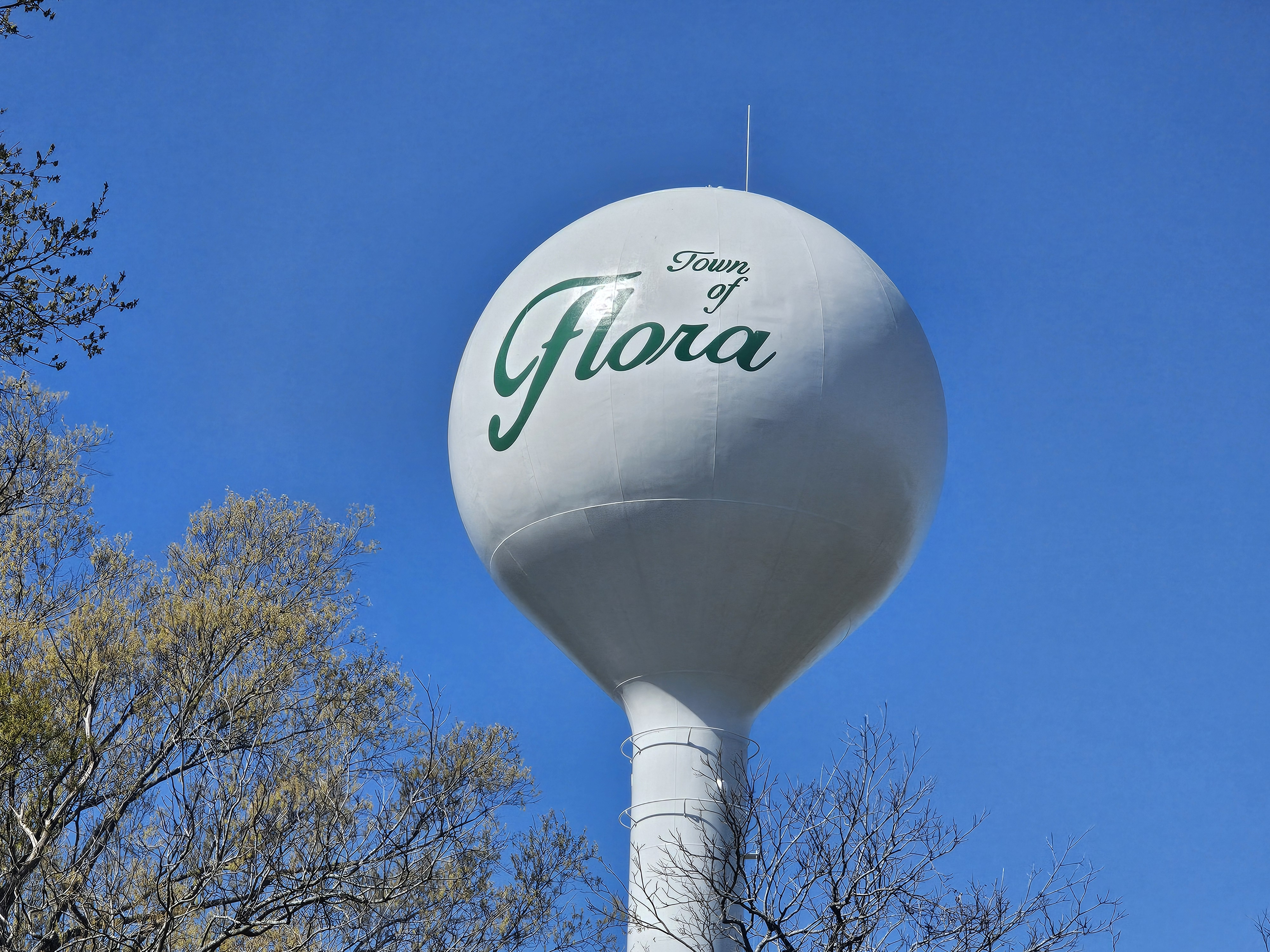
- Water Tower in Flora

- Location in Madison County and the state of Mississippi

- Location in the United States
- Coordinates: 32°32′36″N 90°18′51″W
- Country: United States
- State: Mississippi
- County: Madison

Area
  - Total: 3.34 sq mi (8.64 km^{2})
  - Land: 3.30 sq mi (8.54 km^{2})
  - Water: 0.039 sq mi (0.10 km^{2})
- Elevation: 256 ft (78 m)

Population (2020)
  - Total: 1,647
  - Density: 499.7/sq mi (192.94/km^{2})
- Time zone: UTC-6 (Central (CST))
  - Summer (DST): UTC-5 (CDT)
- ZIP code: 39071
- Area code: 601
- FIPS code: 28-24940
- GNIS feature ID: 2406501
- Website: www.florams.com

Flora is a town in Madison County, Mississippi, United States. The population was 1,647 at the 2020 census, down from 1,886 in 2010. It is part of the Jackson Metropolitan Statistical Area.

== History ==
Graves in Flora's cemetery date to 1821. A post office was established in 1883. That same year, Flora became a stop on the newly constructed Yazoo and Mississippi Valley Railroad. The railroad depot is now a museum and is listed on the National Register of Historic Places.

Flora was incorporated in 1886.

=== Mississippi Ordnance Plant ===
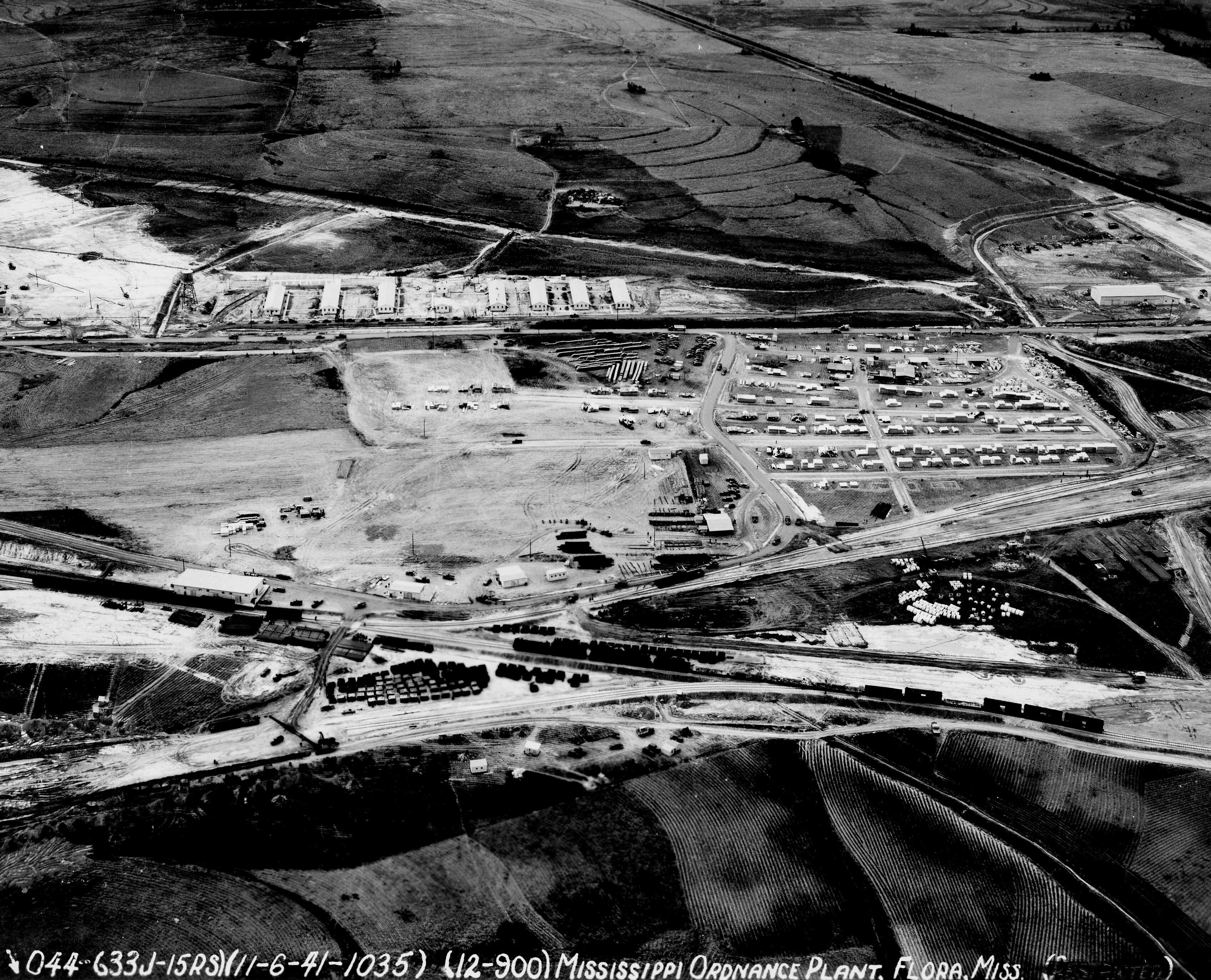
Mississippi Ordnance Plant

In 1941, the Mississippi Ordnance Plant was constructed north of Flora to produce propellant and igniter charges for large-caliber guns during World War II. The site also had firing ranges for sub-machine guns, rifles, anti-aircraft guns, live grenades, and demolition explosives. A notable employee was science fiction writer Cyril M. Kornbluth.

The plant was operated by General Tire. It generally hired African-American men only for jobs as janitors, yard workers, freight loaders, truck drivers and maintenance workers. They were allowed to work in the higher paying production jobs only if white men were not available. African-American women were employed only as maids and cafeteria helpers. In 1942, a local group of African-American citizens met to protest the company's policy.

After the war, the Defense Department declared the site as surplus in 1945. The army certified it as "completely decontaminated". But standards since then are more refined, and the site was dangerously contaminated due to the production and heavy armaments.

In 1947, the Mississippi Department of Education planned to adapt part of the plant into a vocational school for African Americans, until white residents protested to the governor, stating that property values would be ruined.

One of the reinforced bunkers eventually became used for the "Southern Vital Records" storage facility. In 1977, a local high school student found an abandoned M-2A2 tank in a wooded area.

=== National Bio and Agro-Defense Facility ===
In 2008, the U.S. Department of Homeland Security announced that the Flora Industrial Park was one of six locations in the United States being considered for the construction of a new National Bio and Agro-Defense Facility. Some people were concerned about dangers from biological research.

Flora's mayor, Scott Greaves, had responded to opposition to the facility in 2007, saying, "Education is the whole key to it. You have to find the people who are concerned and educate them. In the end, you're still going to have a few idiots." Manhattan, Kansas, was finally selected as the site for the new facility.

== Geography ==
Flora is in western Madison County. U.S. Route 49 passes through the western side of the town, leading north 23 miles (37 km) to Yazoo City and southeast 20 miles (32 km) to Jackson. Mississippi Highway 22 passes through the center of Flora, leading east 18 miles (29 km) to Canton, the Madison county seat, and southwest 25 miles (40 km) to Edwards.

According to the U.S. Census Bureau, Flora has a total area of 3.3 square miles (8.5 km^{2}), of which 0.04 square miles (0.10 km^{2}), or 1.17%, are water. The eastern side of Flora is drained by Town Creek, while the western side is drained by unnamed tributaries of Bogue Chitto Creek. All of the streams eventually flow northwestward to the Big Black River, a tributary of the Mississippi.

Just outside the Flora city limits lies a forest collection of petrified wood, the Mississippi Petrified Forest. It is said to be the only such forest east of the Mississippi River.

== Demographics ==
Historical population
Census	Pop.	Note	%±
1890	228		—
1900	304		33.3%
1910	747		145.7%
1920	698		−6.6%
1930	513		−26.5%
1940	509		−0.8%
1950	655		28.7%
1960	743		13.4%
1970	987		32.8%
1980	1,507		52.7%
1990	1,482		−1.7%
2000	1,546		4.3%
2010	1,886		22.0%
2020	1,647		−12.7%
U.S. Decennial Census

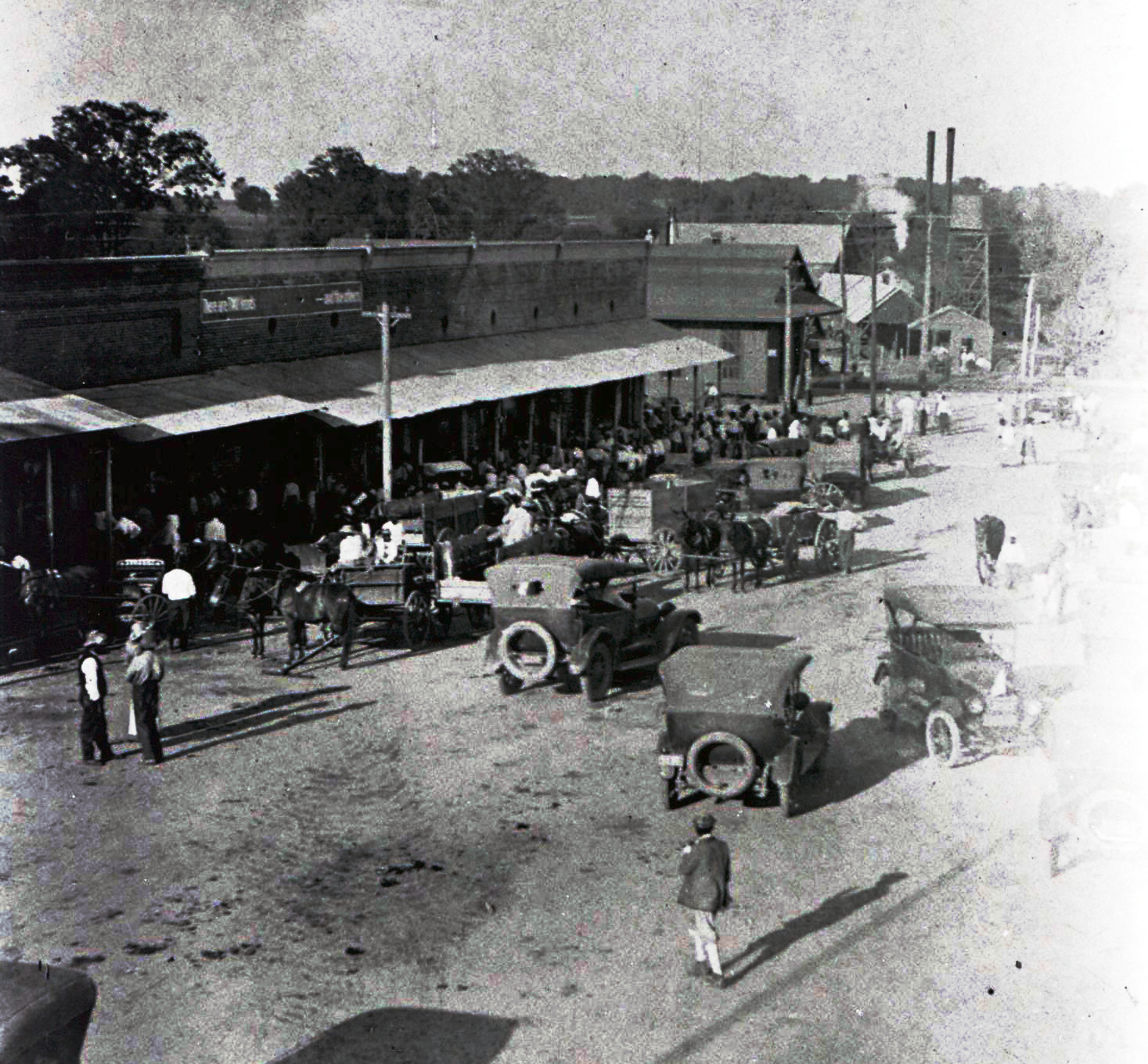
Looking east on Main Street in Flora, c. 1915

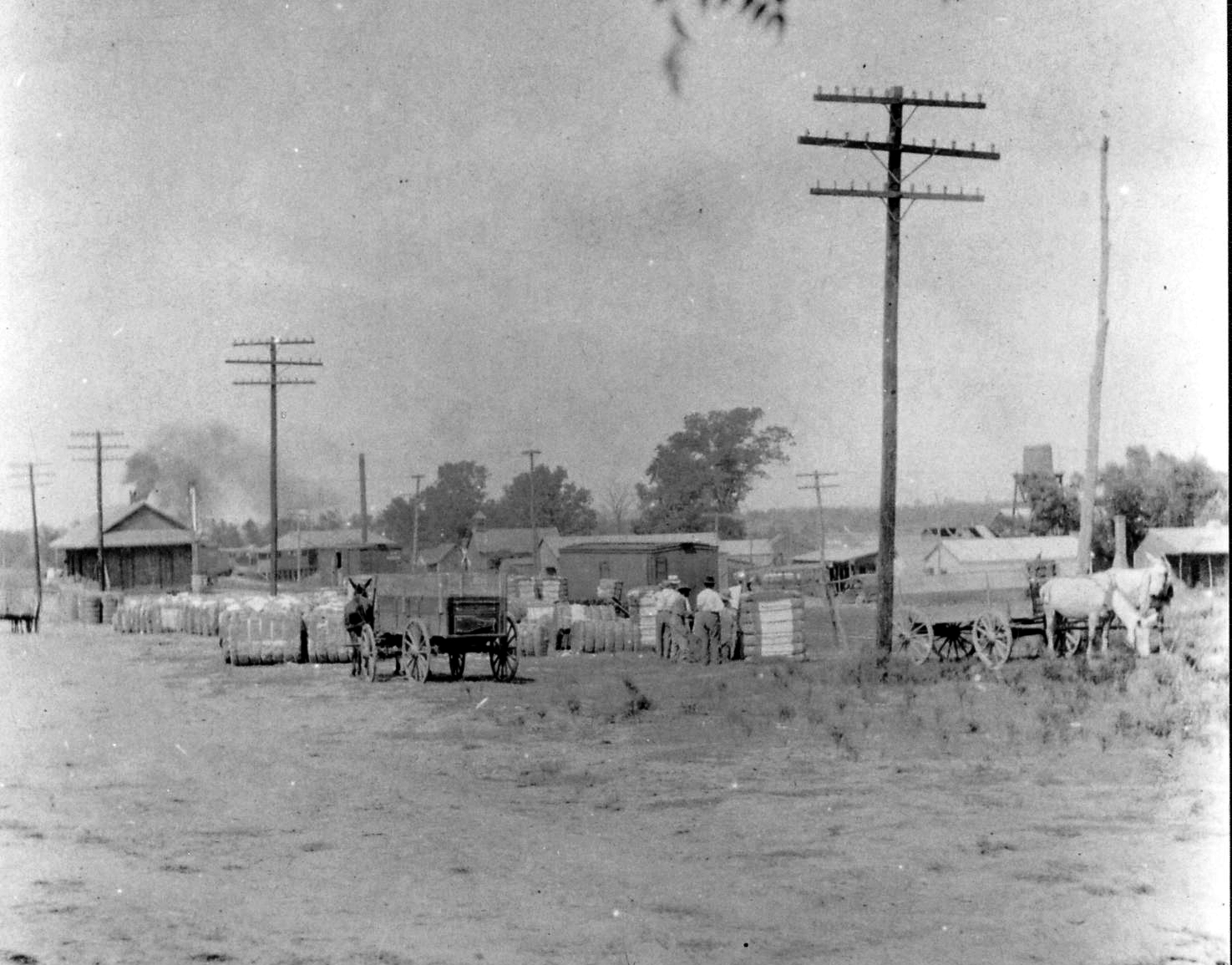
Cotton bales near Flora's railroad depot, c. 1915

=== 2020 census ===
As of the 2020 census, there were 1,647 people, 676 households, and 503 families residing in the town. The median age was 35.9 years. 26.8% of residents were under the age of 18 and 16.4% of residents were 65 years of age or older. For every 100 females, there were 87.4 males, and for every 100 females age 18 and over, there were 83.0 males age 18 and over.

0.0% of residents lived in urban areas, while 100.0% lived in rural areas.

There were 676 households in Flora, of which 35.8% had children under the age of 18 living in them. Of all households, 33.6% were married-couple households, 21.9% were households with a male householder and no spouse or partner present, and 41.4% were households with a female householder and no spouse or partner present. About 36.2% of all households were made up of individuals, and 17.7% had someone living alone who was 65 years of age or older.

There were 727 housing units, of which 7.0% were vacant. The homeowner vacancy rate was 0.5% and the rental vacancy rate was 8.3%.

Racial composition as of the 2020 census
Race	Number	Percent
White	844	51.2%
Black or African American	747	45.4%
American Indian and Alaska Native	7	0.4%
Asian	2	0.1%
Native Hawaiian and Other Pacific Islander	0	0.0%
Some other race	9	0.5%
Two or more races	38	2.3%
Hispanic or Latino (of any race)	13	0.8%

=== 2000 census ===
As of the census of 2000, there were 1,546 people, 575 households, and 416 families residing in the town. The population density was 454.2 inhabitants per square mile (175.4/km^{2}). There were 606 housing units at an average density of 178.0 per square mile (68.7/km^{2}). The racial makeup of the town was 57.05% White, 42.04% African American, 0.65% Native American, 0.06% from other races, and 0.19% from two or more races. Hispanic or Latino of any race were 0.32% of the population.

There were 575 households, out of which 36.5% had children under the age of 18 living with them, 44.7% were married couples living together, 25.0% had a female householder with no husband present, and 27.5% were non-families. 25.4% of all households were made up of individuals, and 9.7% had someone living alone who was 65 years of age or older. The average household size was 2.69 and the average family size was 3.21.

In the town, the population was spread out, with 29.3% under the age of 18, 9.4% from 18 to 24, 30.8% from 25 to 44, 19.7% from 45 to 64, and 10.9% who were 65 years of age or older. The median age was 32 years. For every 100 females, there were 86.3 males. For every 100 females age 18 and over, there were 82.2 males.

The median income for a household in the town was $38,077, and the median income for a family was $41,324. Males had a median income of $31,786 versus $22,176 for females. The per capita income for the town was $16,075. About 18.7% of families and 25.3% of the population were below the poverty line, including 44.4% of those under age 18 and 10.6% of those age 65 or over.

== Transportation ==
Amtrak’s City of New Orleans, which operates between New Orleans and Chicago, passes through the town on CN tracks, but makes no stop. The nearest station is located in Jackson, 20 miles (32 km) to the south.

== Education ==
Flora is served by the Madison County School District. It is zoned to East Flora Elementary. Residents are in turn zoned to Madison Middle School, Rosa Scott 9th Grade, and Madison Central High School.

The Tri-County Academy, a private school, is located in Flora.

== Media ==
Flora is served both by radio station WYAB 103.9 FM and The Flora News, a monthly free community newspaper.

== Notable people ==
- Maurice Black, member of the Mississippi House of Representatives
- E. C. Coleman, professional basketball player
- Swayze Bozeman, professional football player
- Parys Haralson, professional football player
- Paul "Wine" Jones, blues singer and guitarist
- Belle Kearney, temperance reformer and first female Mississippi state senator in 1923
- Xavian Stapleton, former college basketball player
- Cecil Price, deputy sheriff, Ku Klux Klan member, and convict
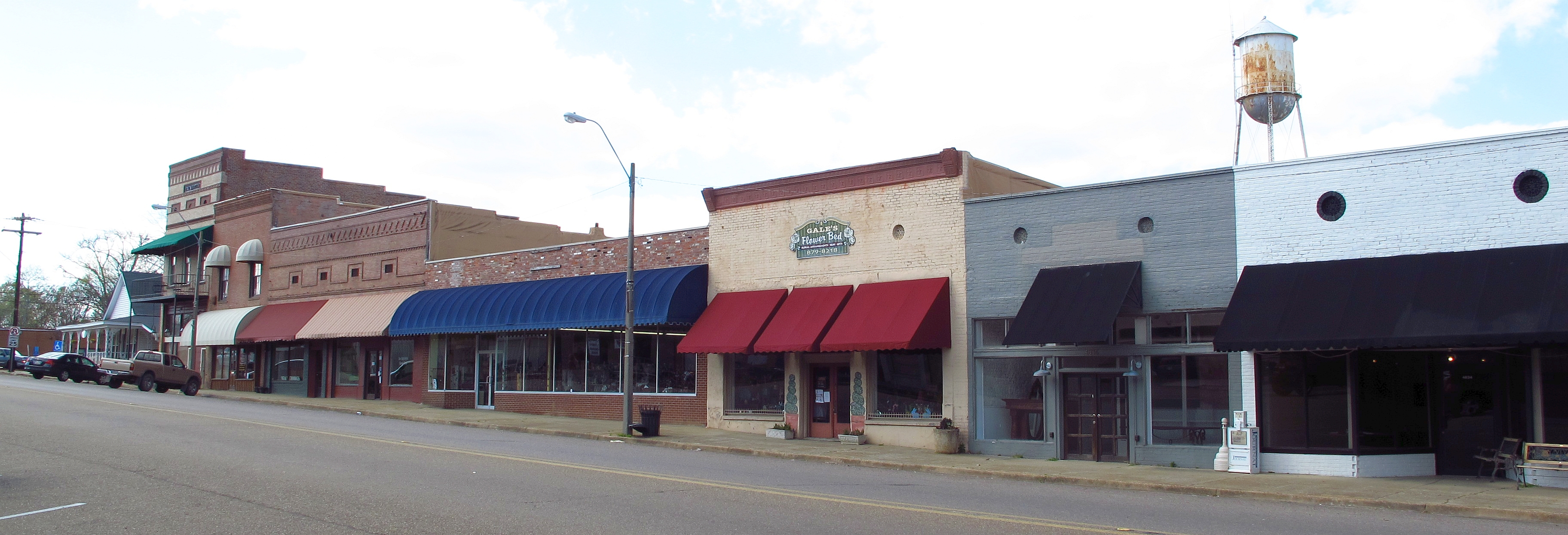
East Main Street in Flora
