= WYAB =

Radio station in Pocahontas–Jackson, Mississippi

Coordinates: 32.447°N 90.302°W

- Pocahontas, Mississippi; United States
- Broadcast area: Jackson, Mississippi
- Frequency: 103.9 MHz
- Branding: 103.9 WYAB

Programming
- Format: News/Talk
- Affiliations: ABC News Radio; Premiere Networks; Radio America; Salem Radio Network; Atlanta Falcons; Memphis Grizzlies

Ownership
- Owner: SSR Communications, Inc.

History
- First air date: 1997 (as WMGO-FM at 93.1); August 2008 (as WYAB at 103.9)
- Former call signs: WMGO-FM (1997–2003)
- Former frequencies: 93.1 MHz (1997–2008)

Technical information
- Facility ID: 77646
- Class: C2
- ERP: 15,000 watts
- HAAT: 276 meters

Links
- Webcast: Listen Live
- Website: wyab.com

WYAB 103.9 FM (formerly 93.1 FM) is a radio station serving the city of Jackson, Mississippi, including Madison County, Yazoo County, Rankin County, and Hinds County. The studios of WYAB are located within the Cotton Exchange Plaza in Flora, Mississippi.

== History ==
WYAB originally began as WAZF-FM in 1984 as a vacant allotment in the FCC's Table of Allotments, which is essentially a community-by-community listing of all radio station channels and classes within the United States and its territories. The initial allotment was for a 3,000-watt station to broadcast on 93.7 FM to serve Yazoo City. The allotment was created by a company known as Dri-Two, Inc. to serve as a "sister" FM station to the now-silent WAZF 1230 AM, also licensed to Yazoo City. The vacant allotment sat without an actual broadcast station occupying its place from 1984 until 1995, when Mississippi College, license holder of WHJT 93.5 FM, petitioned the FCC to have the allotment removed from the Table. The college intended to upgrade the facilities of WHJT in nearby Clinton from 3,000 watts to 6,000 watts, something that could not have been accomplished with interference from a potential station on 93.7 FM in Yazoo City. After some public interest in the retaining the allotment at Yazoo City, the FCC developed an alternate solution that could accommodate all parties. The FCC moved the vacant allotment from 93.7 FM to 93.1 FM and granted the WHJT upgrade.

After making the frequency change in 1995, the FCC solicited interest from parties intent on building a radio station on 93.1 FM in Yazoo City. Although two parties expressed interest in the station during the frequency change stage (individual Clifton Thomas of Jackson and Dain Schult Radioactivity, Inc. of East Point, Georgia), a local third contender, Gordon ("Jerry") J. Lousteau, Jr., of WMGO 1370 AM in Canton was the only person that responded to the FCC's public notice, and therefore his WMGO Broadcasting Corporation was granted the license. He placed the station on the air in 1997 and it was known as WMGO-FM. The original studio was located at 1307 East Broadway Street in Yazoo City.

In April 2003, the WMGO Broadcasting Corporation sold the station to SSR Communications, Inc., and to avoid confusion of the still operating WMGO 1370 AM in Canton, SSR changed the WMGO-FM call letters to WYAB, branding it "B93: Central Mississippi's Oldies Leader". Approximately one year later, SSR moved the WYAB air studio to the Cotton Exchange Plaza in Flora, a town approximately 22 miles (35 km) south of Yazoo City.

In January 2005, WYAB's city of license was changed from Yazoo City to the town of Benton, a community approximately six miles east of Yazoo City. This change in city of license was necessary for WYAB to move its tower approximately ten miles south of its original location. Then, in December 2005, WYAB began broadcast operations from its new tower site ten miles (16 km) south of Benton.

In February 2008, WYAB received approval from the FCC to change its broadcast frequency from 93.1 MHz to 103.9 MHz and (once again) relocate its tower closer to Flora, which is where the air studio is located. Concurrent with that action, the FCC allowed WYAB to change its community of license from Benton to Flora, marking the third different community of license that the station has had in its relative short history.

On August 28, 2008, WYAB began broadcasting from a tower site approximately five miles northeast of Flora. Concurrent with this latest tower move, WYAB migrated formats from oldies to talk radio. For a short time thereafter, WYAB had still retained some ties to its oldies music origins, as it aired a weekly three-hour-long oldies show on an irregular schedule every weekend (most often dictated by its weekend sports schedule).

Just five months later, on January 24, 2009, WYAB moved to a tower three miles (4.8 km) southeast of Flora, the fourth different broadcast facility for the station. At the same time, WYAB announced that it would become the new flagship radio station of the Mississippi Braves minor league baseball team.

On September 13, 2010, WYAB moved once again to a new 400-foot (120 m) tower in Hinds County, approximately six miles northwest of Jackson. Thus, from December 2005 to September 2010, the station had broadcast from five different antenna locations, moving approximately 26 miles (42 km) closer to Jackson (when compared to the original tower location) in the process.

In November 2022, WYAB relocated to another broadcast tower site in the Tougaloo community of north Jackson.

On October 29, 2025, WYAB began broadcasting from its current site at a tower near Harvey Drive in Jackson.

== 2002 listing on eBay ==
WYAB (then WMGO-FM) holds a rather unusual distinction in the annals of radio station transaction history. In April 2002, then-owner Jerry Lousteau placed the radio station up for sale on eBay, gaining national attention within the broadcast industry as one of the first owners to attempt to sell a radio station via an Internet auction. The purchase price was listed at $210,000.00, with the listing reading:

Name your own format. Be your own boss. You are bidding on the assets of the station, including tower, antenna, and studios. This is not a toy. Covers over 100,000 people!

Ultimately, the listing for WMGO-FM garnered no qualified bidders. SSR Communications, Inc. purchased the station from Mr. Lousteau after the extensive press coverage within broadcast trade publications regarding the attempted eBay sale.

== Format and Programming ==
When the station was put on the air in 1997 on 93.1 FM, WYAB had broadcast oldies hits from the 1950s, 1960s, and 1970s.

In August, 2008, however, the station migrated to a talk radio format on 103.9 FM, featuring personalities such as Chris Davis, Chip Matthews, Clay Edwards, Mike Madison, Andrew Gasser, Lindsey Beckham, Kim Wade, Matthew Bishop, Dana Loesch, Mike Gallagher, and Larry Elder.

Programs which formerly were aired by the station include The Mary Weiden Show and The Savage Nation.

WYAB broadcasts Atlanta Braves baseball, Memphis Grizzlies basketball, Louisiana State University football, Atlanta Falcons football, as well as the Tri County Academy football, boys' and girls' basketball and baseball teams.

WYAB airs many local and community-oriented programs as well numerous public affairs programming, and special events and news reporting.

== Broadcast Site ==
WYAB broadcasts on 103.9 FM from a tower site on Harvey Drive in Jackson with 15,000 watts of effective radiated power. The population served within WYAB's 60 dBu (1.0 mV/m) primary service coverage area is approximately 510,000 persons. From this location, WYAB reaches the largest total potential population of any commercial non-music formatted radio station in Mississippi.

== Audience demographics ==
WYAB's primary audience is between the ages of 45 and 64, with men making up a slight majority of the listeners. WYAB also broadcasts numerous sports teams including the Atlanta Braves, Atlanta Falcons, Memphis Grizzlies, LSU Tigers, and NFL Sunday Night Football and Monday Night Football which attract a large male audience.
