= Swayze Bozeman =

American football player (born 1998)

No. 47 – Cincinnati Bengals
- Position: Linebacker
- Roster status: Injured reserve/designated for return

Personal information
- Born: November 2, 1998 (age 28); Flora, Mississippi, U.S.
- Listed height: 6 ft 1 in (1.85 m)
- Listed weight: 224 lb (102 kg)

Career information
- High school: Tri-County Academy (Flora, Mississippi)
- College: Copiah–Lincoln (2017–2018); Southern Miss (2019–2023)
- NFL draft: 2024: undrafted

Career history
- Kansas City Chiefs (2024); Chicago Bears (2025)*; New York Giants (2025); Cincinnati Bengals (2026–present)
- * Offseason or practice squad member only

Career NFL statistics as of 2025
- Total tackles: 9
- Stats at Pro Football Reference

Swayze Bozeman (born November 2, 1998) is an American professional football linebacker for the Cincinnati Bengals of the National Football League (NFL). He played college football for the Copiah–Lincoln Wolves and Southern Miss Golden Eagles.

== Early life ==
Bozeman was born on November 2, 1998, in Flora, Mississippi. He attended Tri-County Academy in Flora where he competed in football, basketball and track and field. In football, he played on both defense and at running back, helping his school to two MAIS AA state championship appearances. He graduated from Tri-County in 2017 and opted to play college football for the Copiah–Lincoln Wolves, a community college team.

== College career ==
Bozeman played at safety for Copiah–Lincoln in 2017 before switching to linebacker in 2018. As a sophomore in 2018, he was named All-Region after posting a team-leading 91 tackles. He was also a first-team All-Mississippi Association of Community and Junior Colleges (MACJC) selection. He concluded his two-year stint with the Wolves having totaled 133 tackles in 19 games played.

Bozeman signed with the Southern Miss Golden Eagles to continue his collegiate career, becoming the first NCAA Division I football player from his high school since 2002. He saw significant playing time in his first year with the team, 2019. He ended up starting eight games while playing in all 13, recording 57 tackles, 6.0 tackles-for-loss (TFLs) and 4.5 sacks. He started all six games in the COVID-19-shortened 2020 season, totaling 42 tackles, then played in four games before taking a redshirt due to injury in 2021, after having made 20 tackles. He appeared in three games in 2022, missing time due to injury, and made 13 tackles as well as returned a fumble for a touchdown. In his final year, 2023, he appeared in six games, making 36 tackles. He concluded his tenure at Southern Miss having recorded 168 tackles, 12.5 TFLs and 6.5 sacks in 32 games played.

== Professional career ==
Pre-draft measurables
Height	Weight	Arm length	Hand span	Wingspan	40-yard dash	10-yard split	20-yard split	20-yard shuttle	Three-cone drill	Vertical jump	Broad jump	Bench press
6 ft 1 3/8 in (1.86 m)	224 lb (102 kg)	30 7/8 in (0.78 m)	8 1/8 in (0.21 m)	6 ft 3 3/4 in (1.92 m)	4.55 s	1.57 s	2.56 s	4.22 s	6.67 s	36.0 in (0.91 m)	10 ft 11 in (3.33 m)	24 reps
All values from Pro Day

=== Kansas City Chiefs ===
Bozeman impressed at his pro day, recording marks in the bench press, broad jump, shuttle run and three-cone drill which each would have been the best among linebackers at the NFL Scouting Combine. After going unselected in the 2024 NFL draft, he signed with the Kansas City Chiefs as an undrafted free agent. He was waived on August 27, 2024, and re-signed to the practice squad the following day. He was elevated to the active roster for the team's Week 14 game against the Los Angeles Chargers and made his NFL debut in the game.

=== Chicago Bears ===
On February 14, 2025, Bozeman signed with the Chicago Bears. He was waived on August 24.

=== New York Giants ===
On August 28, 2025, Bozeman was signed to the New York Giants' practice squad. He was promoted to the active roster on September 16. Bozeman was waived on October 25, having recorded three tackles in four appearances for the team. Bozeman was subsequently re-signed to the practice squad three days later.

Bozeman signed a reserve/future contract with New York on January 5, 2026. On May 7, Bozeman was released by the Giants.

=== Cincinnati Bengals ===
On May 8, 2026, Bozeman was claimed off waivers by the Cincinnati Bengals.
