= Cincinnati Bengals =

NFL team in Cincinnati, Ohio

- Current season
Logo	Wordmark
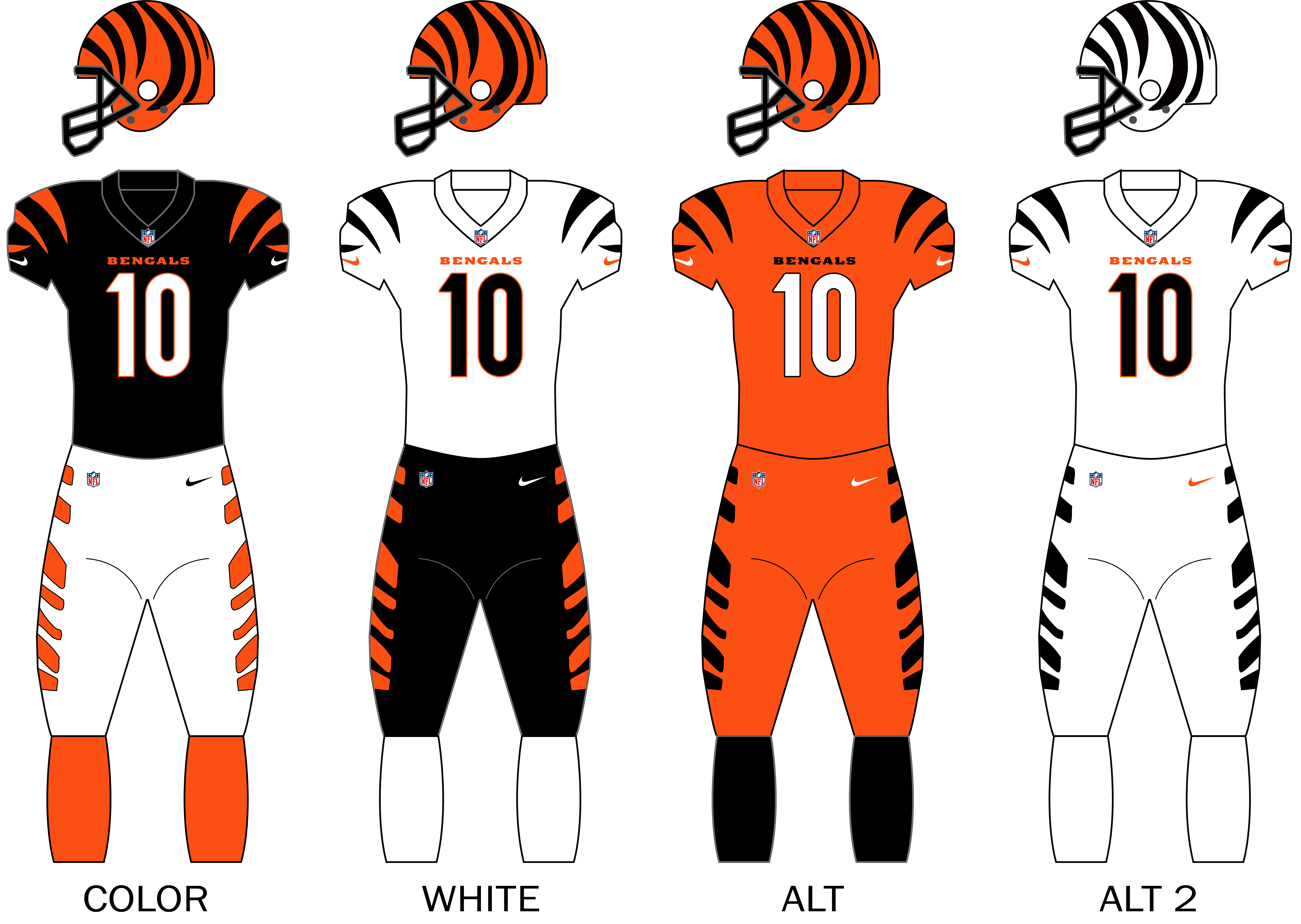
- Uniforms

General information
- Founded: May 23, 1967; 59 years ago
- Stadium: Paycor Stadium; Cincinnati, Ohio
- Headquartered: Paycor Stadium; Cincinnati, Ohio
- Colors: Black, orange, white
- Fight song: The Bengals Growl
- Mascot: Who Dey
- Website: bengals.com

Personnel
- Owner: Mike Brown
- General manager: Duke Tobin (Note: De facto)
- Head coach: Zac Taylor

Team history
- Cincinnati Bengals (1968–present)

Home fields
- Nippert Stadium (1968–1969); Riverfront Stadium (1970–1999); Paycor Stadium (2000–present)

League / conference affiliations
- American Football League (1968–1969): AFL West (1968–1969); National Football League (1970–present): American Football Conference (1970–present); AFC Central (1970–2001); AFC North (2002–present)

Championships
- Conference championships: 3: AFC: 1981, 1988, 2021
- Division championships: 11: AFC Central: 1970, 1973, 1981, 1988, 1990; AFC North: 2005, 2009, 2013, 2015, 2021, 2022

Playoff appearances (16)
- NFL: 1970, 1973, 1975, 1981, 1982, 1988, 1990, 2005, 2009, 2011, 2012, 2013, 2014, 2015, 2021, 2022

Owners
- Paul Brown (1967–1991); Mike Brown (1991–present)

The Cincinnati Bengals are a professional American football team based in Cincinnati, Ohio. The Bengals compete in the National Football League (NFL) as a member of the American Football Conference (AFC) North division. The team plays its home games at Paycor Stadium in downtown Cincinnati.

Former Cleveland Browns head coach Paul Brown began planning for the creation of the Bengals franchise in 1965, and Cincinnati's city council approved the construction of Riverfront Stadium in 1966. Finally, in 1967, the Bengals were founded when a group headed by Brown received franchise approval by the American Football League (AFL) on May 23, 1967, and they began play in the 1968 season. Brown was the Bengals' head coach from their inception to 1975.

After being dismissed as the Browns' head coach by Art Modell (who had purchased a majority interest in the team in 1961) in January 1963, Brown had shown interest in establishing another NFL franchise in Ohio and looked at both Cincinnati and Columbus. He ultimately chose the former when a deal between the city, Hamilton County, and Major League Baseball's Cincinnati Reds (who were seeking a replacement for the obsolete Crosley Field) was struck that resulted in an agreement to build a multipurpose stadium which could host both baseball and football games. Due to the impending merger of the AFL and the NFL, which was scheduled to take full effect in the 1970 season, Brown agreed to join the AFL as its 10th and final franchise. The Bengals, like the other former AFL teams, were assigned to the AFC following the merger. Cincinnati was also selected because, like the baseball team they shared a city with (the Cincinnati Reds), they could draw from several large neighboring cities (Louisville and Lexington, Kentucky; Columbus, Dayton, and Springfield, Ohio) that are all no more than 110 miles (180 km) away from downtown Cincinnati, along with Indianapolis, until the Baltimore Colts relocated there prior to the 1984 NFL season.

After Paul Brown's death in 1991, controlling interest in the team was inherited by his son, Mike Brown. In 2011, Brown purchased shares of the team owned by the estate of co-founder Austin Knowlton and is now the majority owner of the Bengals franchise.

The Bengals won the AFC championship in 1981, 1988, and in 2021. After each of the 1981 and 1988 conference championships, they went on to lose to the San Francisco 49ers, in Super Bowls XVI and XXIII. The team struggled greatly in the 1990s and the early 2000s, during which time they were sometimes referred to disparagingly as "The Bungles," a term coined by Steelers broadcaster Myron Cope. Following the 1990 season, the team went 14 years without making the NFL playoffs or posting a winning record. The Bengals went through several head coaches in that period, and many of their top draft picks did not pan out.

The team's fortunes improved in the mid-2000s and into the mid-2010s, which saw them become more consistent postseason contenders, but they continued to struggle in the playoffs. The turning point for the Bengals was during the 2021 season, when they won their first playoff game in 31 years and advanced to the first of two consecutive AFC Championship games. In 2021, they defeated the Kansas City Chiefs 27–24 in overtime and advanced to Super Bowl LVI, their first appearance in the Super Bowl in 33 years, where they lost to the Los Angeles Rams 23–20. They advanced to the AFC Championship game again in 2022 but lost to the eventual Super Bowl champion Chiefs by a score of 23–20.

The team does not have an official general manager. However, Duke Tobin is the Bengals' "de facto general manager" because he handles most personnel decisions. In a 2011 survey, Brown was rated as among the worst team owners in American professional sports.

In a Forbes article on the value of NFL teams as of August 2022, the Cincinnati Bengals were ranked last with a value of $3 billion.

== History ==
=== Brown family era (1968–present) ===
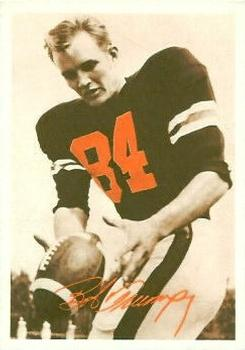
Bob Trumpy, Bengals tight end from 1968 to 1977

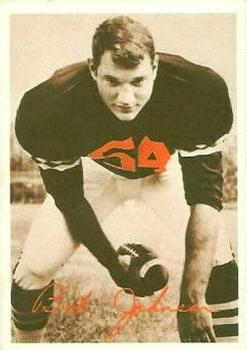
Bob Johnson, Bengals center from 1968 to 1979

In 1967, an ownership group led by Paul Brown was granted a franchise in the American Football League. Brown named the team the Bengals in order "to give it a link with past professional football in Cincinnati". Another Cincinnati Bengals team had existed in the city and played in three previous American Football Leagues from 1937 to 1942. The city's world-renowned zoo was also home to a rare white Bengal tiger.

In a possible insult to Art Modell – or possibly as a homage to the Massillon Tigers – Brown chose the exact shade of orange used by his former team. He added black as the secondary color. Brown chose a very simple logo: the word "BENGALS" in black lettering. One of the potential helmet designs Brown rejected was a striped motif that was similar to the helmets adopted by the team in 1981 still in use today; however, that design featured stripes which were more uniform in width. The Bengals began play in the 1968 season.

In 1966, the American Football League agreed to a merger with its older and more established rival, the National Football League. Among the terms of the merger was that the AFL was permitted to add one additional franchise; the NFL wanted an even number of clubs in the merged league, so a team needed to be added to bring the number of clubs in the merged league to 26 teams.

For the AFL, a key motive behind their agreement to accept a new team was that the guarantee of an eventual place in the NFL meant the league could charge a steep expansion fee of $10 million – 400 times the $25,000 the original eight owners paid when they founded the league in 1960. The cash from the new team provided the American Football League with the funds needed to pay the indemnities required to be paid by the AFL to the NFL, as stipulated by the merger agreement.

Prior to the merger's announcement, Brown had not seriously considered joining the American Football League and was not a supporter of what he openly regarded to be an inferior competition, once famously stating that "I didn't pay ten million dollars to be in the AFL." However, with the announcement of the merger, Brown realized that the AFL expansion franchise would likely be his only realistic path back into the NFL in the short to medium term, and ultimately acquiesced to joining the AFL after learning that the team was guaranteed to become an NFL franchise after the merger was completed in 1970.

There was also a major problem: Major League Baseball's Cincinnati Reds were in need of a facility to replace Crosley Field, which they had used since 1912. By this time, the small park was antiquated and rundown, and parking issues had plagued the city since the early 1950s, while the park also lacked modern amenities – issues that were exacerbated by the Mill Creek Expressway (I-75) project that ran alongside the park.

While New York City – which had lost both its National League teams in 1957 after the Dodgers relocated to Los Angeles, and the Giants relocated to San Francisco – had actively courted Reds owner Powel Crosley to relocate his team there, Crosley was adamant that the Reds remain in Cincinnati and tolerated the worsening problems with the Crosley Field location.

With assistance from Ohio governor Jim Rhodes, Hamilton County and the Cincinnati city council agreed to build a single multi-purpose facility on the dilapidated riverfront section of the city: the new facility had to be ready by the opening of the 1970 NFL season, and was officially named Riverfront Stadium.

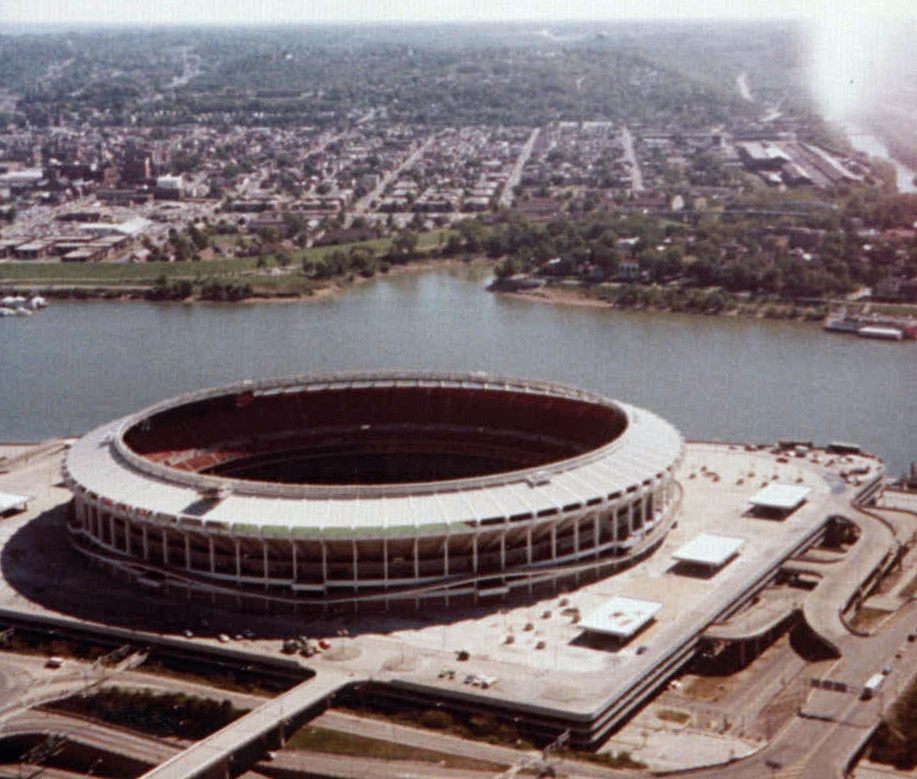
Riverfront Stadium, home of the Bengals from 1970 to 1999

With the completion of the merger in 1970, the Cleveland Browns were one of three NFL teams that agreed to move to the AFL-based American Football Conference to give both conferences an equal number of teams and were placed in the AFC Central, the same division as the Bengals. An instant rivalry was born, fueled initially by Paul Brown's rivalry with Art Modell.

==== Paul Brown and Bill Johnson years (1968–1978) ====
For their first two seasons, the Bengals played at Nippert Stadium, the current home of the University of Cincinnati Bearcats. The team held training camp at Wilmington College in Wilmington, through the 1968 preseason. The team finished its first season with a 3–11 record and running back Paul Robinson, who rushed for 1,023 yards, and was named the AFL Rookie of the Year.

Founder Paul Brown coached the team for its first eight seasons. One of Brown's college draft strategies was to draft players from non-traditional football schools. Punter/wide receiver Pat McInally attended Harvard University, and linebacker Reggie Williams attended Dartmouth College and served on Cincinnati city council while on the Bengals' roster. Because of this policy, many former players went on to have successful careers in commentary and broadcasting as well as the arts. In addition, Brown had a knack for locating and recognizing pro football talent in unusual places.

In 1970, the Bengals moved to play at Riverfront Stadium, a home they shared with the Cincinnati Reds until the team moved to Paul Brown Stadium in 2000. Notable players of the 1970 team included Virgil Carter, Chip Meyers, Jack Meckstroth, Bob Trumpy, and Lemar Parrish. Virgil Carter threw for 1,647 yards. Chip Myers paced all receivers, catching 32 passes for 542 yards. Bob Trumpy contributed to the receiving game, too. The team reached the playoffs three times during that decade, but could not win any of those postseason games. In 1975, the team posted an 11–3 record, giving them what remains the highest winning percentage (.786) in franchise history. But it only earned them a wild card spot in the playoffs, behind the 12–2 Pittsburgh Steelers, who went on to win the Super Bowl; the Bengals lost to the Oakland Raiders 31–28 in the divisional playoffs.

==== Forrest Gregg/Sam Wyche years (1980–1991) ====
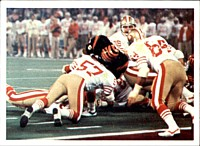
The Bengals played against the 49ers in Super Bowl XVI (pictured) and XXIII, but lost in both games.

The Bengals reached the Super Bowl twice during the 1980s – in Super Bowl XVI and Super Bowl XXIII – and lost against the San Francisco 49ers both times. The team appeared in the playoffs in 1990, making it to the second round before losing to the Los Angeles Raiders.

Before the following season got underway, Paul Brown died at age 82. Due to declining health, he had already transferred control to his son, Mike Brown, but was reported to still influence the daily operations of the team. The Bengals' fortunes changed for the worse as the team posted 14 consecutive non-winning seasons and were saddled with numerous draft busts.

==== Marvin Lewis years (2003–2018) ====
The Bengals began to emerge from that dismal period into a new era of increased consistency, however, after the team finished with its worst record in team history, 2–14, which led to the hiring of Marvin Lewis as head coach in 2003. Carson Palmer, the future star quarterback, was drafted in 2003, but did not play a snap that whole season, as Jon Kitna had a comeback year (voted NFL Comeback Player of the Year). Despite Kitna's success, Palmer was promoted to starting quarterback the following season. The team finished with an 8–8 record and missed the postseason in 2004. Under Palmer, the team advanced to the playoffs for the first time since 1990 losing in the Wild Card Round to the Pittsburgh Steelers 31–17 in the 2005 season, which also was the first time the team had a winning percentage above .500 since 1990.

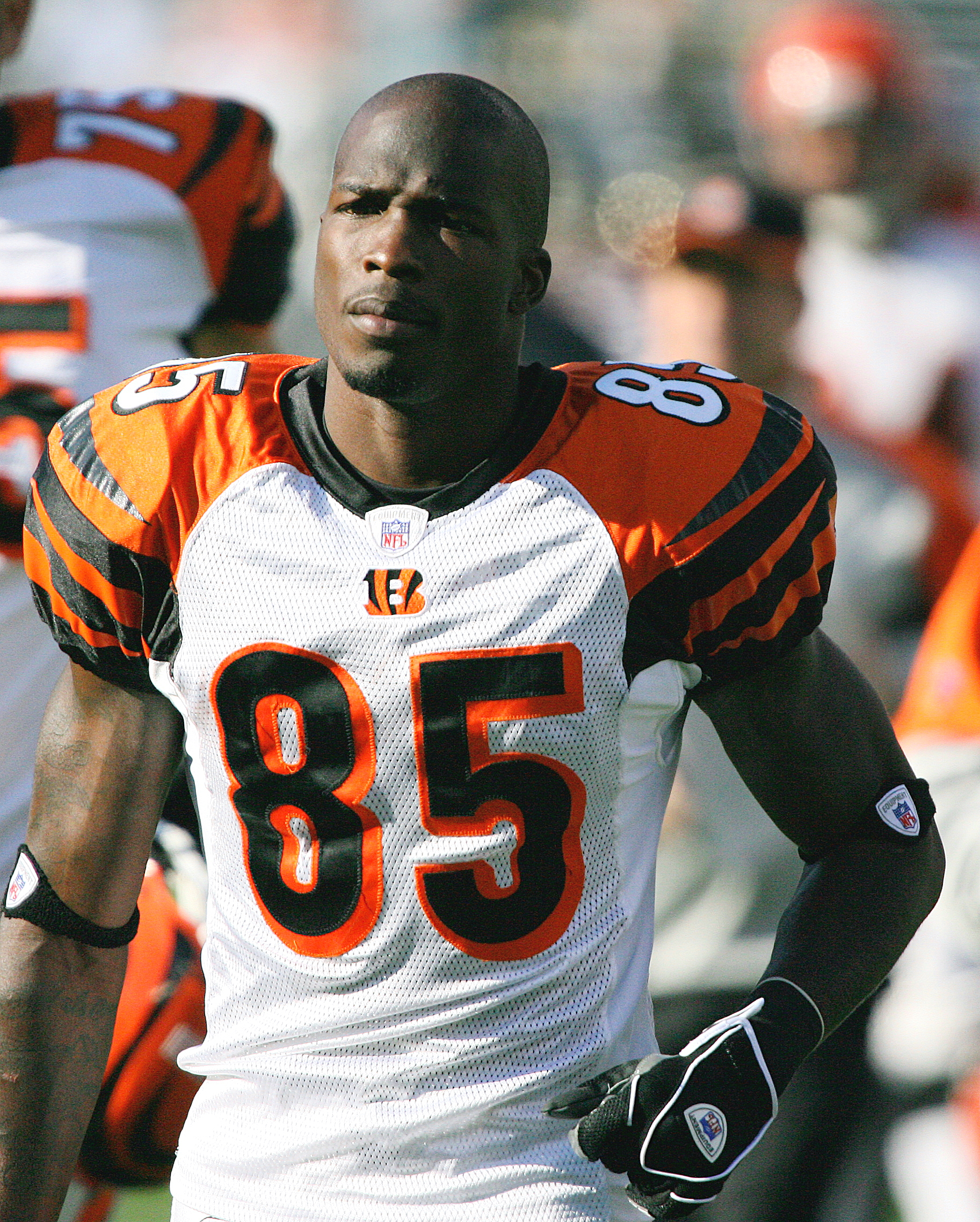
Chad Johnson, Bengals wide receiver from 2001 to 2010

The Bengals returned to the playoffs again in 2009 in a season that included the franchise's first-ever division sweep. This was especially impressive since two of the teams swept by the Bengals – the Pittsburgh Steelers and the Baltimore Ravens – had made it to the AFC Championship Game the previous season. Marvin Lewis was rewarded for the accomplishment with the NFL Coach of the Year Award. In the 2010 season, the Bengals posted a 4–12 record.

Following the disappointing 2010 season, quarterback Carson Palmer demanded to be traded. When the Bengals refused to do so, Palmer announced his retirement from the NFL. He later was moved at the NFL trade deadline to the Oakland Raiders. In the 2011 NFL draft, the Bengals selected wide receiver A. J. Green in the first round and quarterback Andy Dalton in the second round.

The Bengals improved to 9–7 in the 2011 season, and clinched a playoff spot. Dalton and Green became the most prolific rookie WR-QB duo in history, connecting 65 times for 1,057 yards. However, they lost to the Houston Texans, 31–10, in the Wild Card round. In the 2012 season, the Bengals clinched a playoff spot once more with a win over the Pittsburgh Steelers, going to the playoffs in back-to-back years for the first time since 1982. However, the Bengals faced the Texans in the first round yet again and took another early exit, losing 19–13.

In the 2013 season, for the third straight year, the Bengals clinched a playoff berth and also won the AFC North, finishing with an 11–5 record. But once again, the Bengals were defeated in the wild card round, this time by the San Diego Chargers, 27–10. Most of the blame was put on Andy Dalton, who threw two interceptions and fumbled on a forward dive. This made the Bengals 0–5 in playoff games since Mike Brown took over as owner. The 2014 season started well, with the Bengals winning their first three contests against the Baltimore Ravens, Atlanta Falcons, and Tennessee Titans. However, they lost their Week 5 road matchup with the New England Patriots, 43–17. An overtime tie with the Carolina Panthers and a shutout loss to the Indianapolis Colts followed the primetime loss to the Patriots. Finishing the season 10–5–1 as the fifth seed, they lost to the Colts, 26–10, in the first round of the playoffs. This was the first time the franchise made the playoffs four straight seasons.

In 2015, the Bengals got out to a franchise-best 8–0 start with a 31–10 win over the Cleveland Browns. Unfortunately, in Week 14 they would lose starting quarterback Andy Dalton to injury. He would not return that season, leaving A. J. McCarron to start under center. The Bengals finished with a franchise record-tying 12–4 mark. Additionally, they lost to the division rival Pittsburgh Steelers, 18–16, in the Wild Card round in the final minute, making them the first franchise in NFL history to lose five straight opening-round playoff games. This frustration continued in 2016 for the Bengals: they finished the 2016 campaign with a 6–9–1 record, losing several key players to injury, including A. J. Green, Giovani Bernard, and Jeremy Hill. They missed the playoffs for the first time since 2010, marking the first time Andy Dalton missed the playoffs as the Bengals' starting quarterback. One notable game was a 27–27 tie against the Washington Redskins which was played in London in 2016.

Following a rough 2016 season, the Bengals looked forward into 2017. However, after starting 0–3, the Bengals never found their footing. At one point in the season, the Bengals were 5–9. There were rumors that Marvin Lewis would not return for the next season as the Bengals' head coach. However, after two come-from-behind victories over the Lions and Ravens that eliminated both teams from the playoffs, the Bengals finished 7–9. The final two games were convincing enough for owner Mike Brown to give Lewis a new two-year contract.

The 2018 campaign began with promise for the Bengals under Lewis. Cincinnati began the season with a 4–1 record with impressive wins over the Colts, Ravens, Falcons, and Dolphins. However, the Bengals suffered many setbacks after the hot start: defensive coordinator Teryl Austin was fired mid-season because of defensive woes, A. J. Green was injured and officially out for the last four games, and Andy Dalton injured his thumb in the Bengals' first game against the Browns and was replaced by Jeff Driskel for the rest of the season. The Bengals ended 2018 with a final record of 6–10 and finished last place in the AFC North. On December 31, 2018, with one year to go on his contract, Lewis and the Bengals mutually parted ways after three straight losing seasons under his watch.

==== Zac Taylor years (2019–present) ====
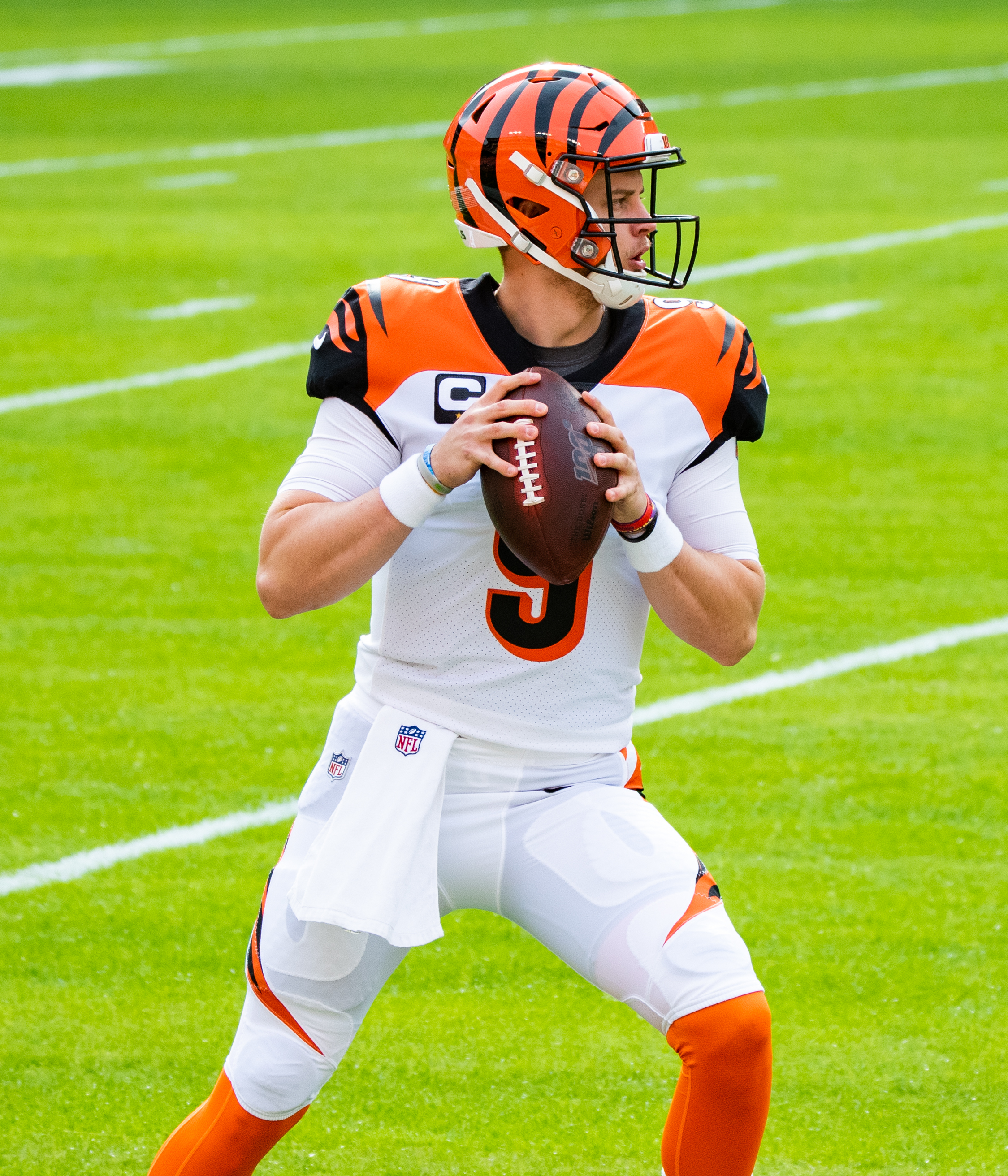
Joe Burrow, Bengals quarterback since 2020

In 2019, they hired head coach Zac Taylor. The 2019 campaign started off with reasonable success, with the Bengals barely losing to Seattle 21–20 at CenturyLink Field; but what started with promise ended in disaster. The Bengals then lost 10 more games and were 0–11 heading into December 2019. To open the month of December, they got their first win of the season against the Jets, 22–6, in Cincinnati. They eventually lost to the Patriots and then to the Dolphins, 38–35, in overtime after Dalton led the team back from 23 points down in the fourth quarter. With the loss to the Dolphins, the Bengals officially clinched the No. 1 overall pick in the 2020 NFL draft. They capped off the season with a win against the Cleveland Browns, finishing 2–14, equaling the 2002 season as the team's worst record in history.

In 2020, the Bengals improved under rookies Joe Burrow and Tee Higgins. Starting the season with a 2–5–1 record going into the bye week, including an overtime tie to the Philadelphia Eagles. Going into Week 11 facing the Washington Football Team, they lost Joe Burrow to a season-ending knee injury that all but ended their season, only winning two more contests against the Pittsburgh Steelers and Houston Texans. Finishing the season 4–11–1.

In 2021, the Bengals won the AFC North with a 10–7 record, which included dominant sweeps of the rival Pittsburgh Steelers and Baltimore Ravens. Led by Joe Burrow, who was playing in his first full season after recovering from his devastating knee injury in Week 11 of his rookie season and rookie receiver, and Burrow's college teammate at LSU, Ja'Marr Chase, Cincinnati would win the AFC North for the first time since 2015. They beat the Kansas City Chiefs, 34–31, in a Week 17 thriller to clinch the division. They then won their first playoff game since the 1990 season, beating the Las Vegas Raiders, 26–19, in the Wild Card round. After that, they upset the top-seeded Tennessee Titans, 19–16, when Evan McPherson kicked a game-winning 52-yard field goal. A week later, they advanced to their first Super Bowl since 1989 when McPherson kicked a 33-yard field goal in overtime to cap off a comeback from being down 21–3 and shock the No. 2 seed Chiefs, 27–24. They lost a close Super Bowl to the Los Angeles Rams in Super Bowl LVI, 23–20.

In Week 1 of the 2022 NFL season, the Bengals lost, 23–20, to the Pittsburgh Steelers in overtime, breaking a three-game winning streak the Bengals had against Pittsburgh. After falling to a 4–4 record in Week 8, the Bengals proceeded to win 8 straight games to tie a franchise-record for single-season wins and earn a 3 seed in the AFC playoffs. They defeated divisional rival Baltimore in the first round 24–17, behind a 98-yard fumble recovery returned for a touchdown by Sam Hubbard. Despite missing three starting offensive linemen, the Bengals followed that up with a decisive 27–10 road win over the favored Buffalo Bills to reach a second straight AFC Championship appearance for the first time in franchise history. Once again, they faced the Kansas City Chiefs in the Championship Game, but this time they lost 23–20, in another thrilling game.

In the 2023 season, during their Week 11 matchup against the Baltimore Ravens, Joe Burrow would suffer a wrist injury that would rule him out the rest of the season. The consistent play of backup quarterback Jake Browning kept the Bengals alive in the postseason hunt after Burrow's injury. The Bengals finished the season 9–8 and missed the playoffs.

The 2024 season, with Burrow returning, came with high expectations for the Bengals; however, Cincinnati limped to a 4–8 start to the season thanks primarily to a porous defense; the Bengals lost four games where they scored at least 33 points; an NFL record. The team finished strong, winning their final five games to finish with a 9–8 record for the second straight season, however, they missed the playoffs for the second consecutive season after the Denver Broncos shutout the Kansas City Chiefs. Burrow led the NFL in passing yards; wide receiver Ja'Marr Chase won the triple crown leading the league in receptions, receiving yards and receiving touchdowns, and defensive end Trey Hendrickson led the league in sacks.

On April 3, 2025, Bengals executive V.P. Katie Blackburn stated that "We could, I guess, go wherever we wanted after this year if we didn't pick the option up" in regards to the team's lease on Paycor Stadium. At the time the Bengals were struggling to reach an agreement on the lease with the City of Cincinnati and Hamilton County. Blackburn also stated that she likes the stadium's downtown location and hopes to secure the team's future there. The Bengals had proposed a $120 million renovation of the stadium which would've seen 90% of the funds raised from taxpayers, which drew fire from Hamilton County commissioners as the Bengals only pay $158,526 in rent per year.

== Logos and uniforms ==
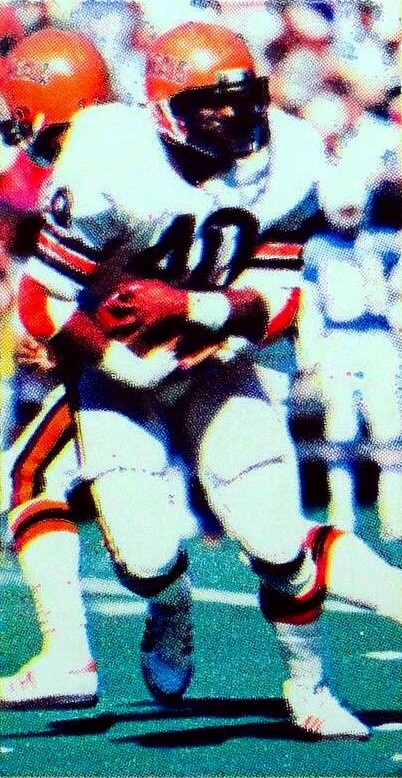
Cincinnati's uniform design from 1968 to 1980

When the team debuted in 1968, the Bengals' uniforms were modeled after the Cleveland Browns. When Paul Brown was fired by Art Modell, Brown still owned the equipment used by Cleveland, so after the firing, Paul Brown packed up all his equipment, which he then used for his new team in Cincinnati. The Cleveland Browns' team colors were brown, orange, and white, and their helmets were solid orange with a white dorsal stripe over the crest.

The Bengals' team colors were orange, black, and white, and their helmets were a similar shade of orange, with the only variations being the word "Bengals" in black block letters (with a white outline) on either side of the helmet and no stripe on the helmet. The Cincinnati Bengals were unique in the NFL, as they did not have secondary uniform numbers on the jerseys (called "TV numbers") until they appeared on the sleeves in the 1980 season; they were the only NFL team that didn't have them prior to that point. That same year, the team changed their helmet face mask color from gray to black. The team did not discard their Cleveland-like uniforms until 1981. During that year, a then-unique uniform design was introduced: Although the team kept black jerseys, white jerseys, and white pants, they were now trimmed with orange and black tiger stripes. The team also introduced the orange helmets with black tiger stripes that are still in use today. Sports Illustrated likened the Bengals' new helmets to "varicose pumpkins."

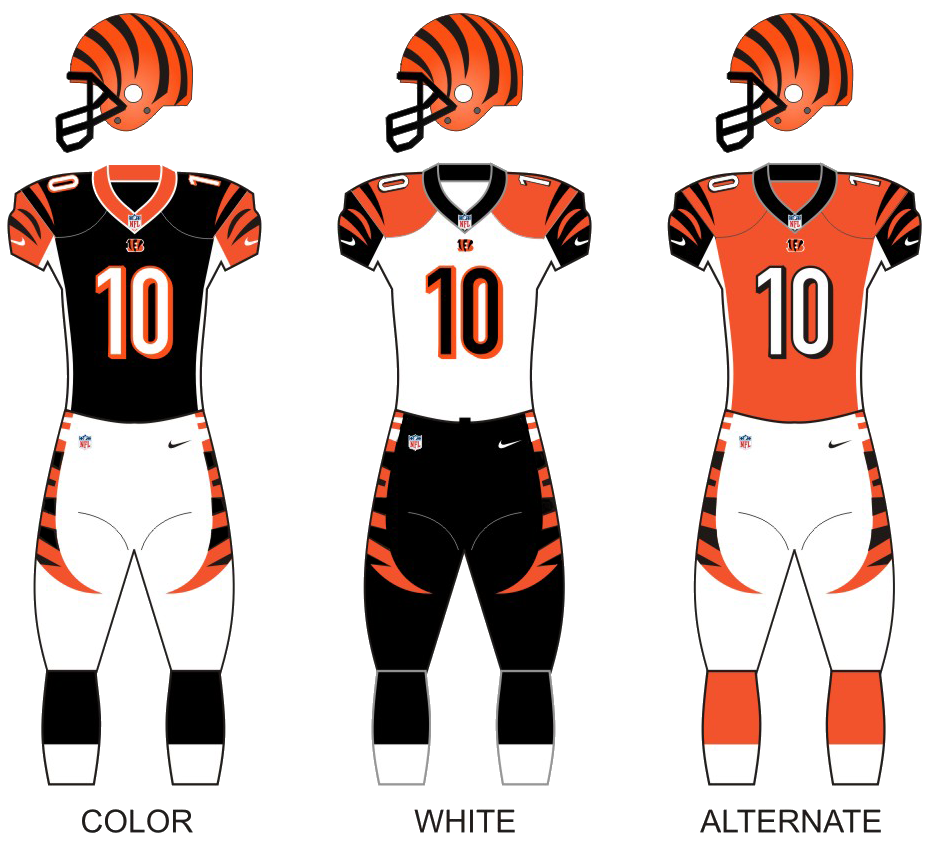
Bengals uniforms used from 2004 to 2020

In 1997, the Bengals designed a logo consisting of a leaping tiger, and it was added to the uniform sleeves (with this, the TV numbers moved to the shoulder). Another alternate logo consisted of a Bengal's head facing to the left. However, the orange helmet with black tiger stripes continued to be the trademark. In 2004, a new tiger stripe pattern and more accents were added to the uniforms. The black jerseys now featured orange tiger-striped sleeves and white side panels, while the white jerseys began to use black tiger-striped sleeves and orange shoulders. A new logo consisting of an orange "B" covered with black tiger stripes was introduced. The team also started rotating black pants and debuted an alternate orange jersey, with white side panels and black tiger-striped sleeves. The Bengals have worn their black uniforms at home throughout their history, with some exceptions, such as the 1970 season, when the Bengals wore white at home for the entire season as well as most of the 1971 season (the Bengals were the first AFL team to wear white at home, as its rules required the home team to wear their dark jerseys, unlike the NFL, which allowed the home team choice of jersey color starting in 1964). Since 2005, the Bengals have worn white for September home games where the heat could become a factor.

In 2016, the Bengals unveiled their all-white Color Rush alternate uniform, featuring black tiger stripes along the sleeves and pants. Orange was only used on the Nike mark, on the team logo, and as an outline color on the player's name.

The club announced a new uniform design on January 21, 2021. The new uniform design would be worn beginning with the 2021 NFL season. The set retains the signature striped helmet, while simplifying the look by removing the side and shoulder panels, creating a new stripe pattern for the sleeves, getting rid of the number block shadow, and removing the stroke on the player's name. This set also puts the team's wordmark on the chest and lacks TV numbers on the sleeves. The shade of orange was changed, as well. The Bengals wore three different pants with this set: black pants with orange stripes, white pants with black stripes, and white pants with orange stripes. The white pants with black stripes were worn with the white jersey in 2021 playoff games at Tennessee and Kansas City. The white pants with orange stripes were worn with the black jersey in Super Bowl LVI against the Rams.

In 2022, after the NFL rescinded the "one-helmet rule," the Bengals unveiled an alternate black-striped white helmet. In addition, the team brought back the all-white Color Rush uniform to be paired with the white helmets. This would last one season, however, as the team decided to pair the white helmet with the primary white uniform for two games in 2023, effectively retiring the Color Rush uniform for the time being.

In 2024, the Bengals added orange pants to the uniform rotation after Madden NFL 25 leaked the option to the public. The Bengals then unveiled a new all-orange uniform combination to be worn September 8 against the Patriots.

== Mascots ==
The team's official mascot is a Bengal tiger named Who Dey. Its jersey number is 1. Aside from Who Dey, the team also has the Ben-Gals, the team's cheerleading squad, which included Laura Vikmanis, the oldest cheerleader in league history.

Carol Motsinger in 2015 said, "In 2012, Cincinnati welcomed another tiger named Who Dey. This time, one that walks on four legs. More than 1,000 Bengals season ticket holders named a Malayan tiger Who Dey at Cincinnati Zoo & Botanical Garden. He was recently traded to a zoo in Kansas."

The Ohio History Central notes: "In 1940, a third American Football League formed, and the Cincinnati Bengals joined it. Unfortunately, World War II began the following year, causing manpower shortages as men joined the armed forces. This prompted this newer AFL to cease playing after the 1941 season. Paul Brown, former coach of the Cleveland Browns, received authorization from a modern American Football League to create a team in Cincinnati. Brown chose the name Bengals to memorialize the teams of the same name that had represented Cincinnati in the past."

== Rivalries ==
=== Divisional ===
==== Cleveland Browns ====
The Bengals' historic rivalry with the Cleveland Browns is often referred to as the "Battle of Ohio", started as the result of former Browns head coach and team founder Paul Brown starting the Bengals franchise after leaving the Browns. The colors of each team are similar since Paul Brown chose the exact shade of orange used by the Browns for the Bengals, and the Bengals' original uniforms were identical to the Browns' uniforms, excluding the word "Bengals" on the helmet. The rivalry reached its peak during the 1980s when both teams were vying viciously for a spot in the playoffs. During the 1990s the rivalry also butted heads when Brown's sons were in charge of the day-to-day operations of the Bengals. The Bengals lead the series 55–48 as of the end of the 2024 season.

==== Pittsburgh Steelers ====
The Bengals and Pittsburgh Steelers have played each other twice a year since becoming division rivals in 1970. This rivalry has gained intensity since the 2000s, as the teams have met twice in the playoffs, with both games being marked by hard hits and injuries with the most infamous example occurring in the 2005 playoffs. The Steelers lead the overall series 71–40 and the postseason series 2–0. However, the Steelers have been more dominant recently, posting a record of 28–7 since 2004, when they drafted Roethlisberger. There were two times that the rivalry has met during the playoffs: the Wild Card rounds of 2005 and 2015, with the Steelers winning both meetings at Cincinnati. The 2005 game is marked as a special time in the rivalry because this is when Steelers defensive tackle Kimo Von Oelhoffen injured Bengals quarterback Carson Palmer, while the 2015 game is also special because Bengals running back Jeremy Hill fumbled the ball in the waning minutes when the Bengals had a 16–15 lead over the Steelers to give the latter one last chance. They used that chance wisely as they drove down the field (with the help of two costly personal fouls by the Bengals) and kicked a game-winning field goal.

==== Baltimore Ravens ====
The Bengals' rivalry with the Baltimore Ravens began when the original Browns franchise relocated to Baltimore to become the Ravens. Since then, the rivalry heated up when longtime Ravens defensive coordinator Marvin Lewis was hired as the head coach of the Bengals. The Ravens lead the all-time series 33-28 as of the 2025 season. The Bengals won the only playoff meeting in the 2022 AFC Wild Card round.

== Contributions to NFL culture ==
=== No-huddle offense ===
A no-huddle offense was commonly used by all teams when time in the game was running low. However, Sam Wyche, the head coach of the Bengals in 1988, along with offensive coordinator Bruce Coslet, made the high-paced offense the standard modality for the ball club regardless of time remaining. By quickly substituting and setting up for the next play—often within 5–10 seconds after the last play despite being afforded 45 seconds—the Bengals hindered the other team's defense from substituting situational players, regrouping for tactics, and resting. In response, the NFL instituted rules allowing the defense ample time for substitutions when offensive substitutions were made. The hurry-up tactic was used by the franchise during the late 1980s while Sam Wyche was the coach. A rival for AFC supremacy during this time was the Buffalo Bills, coached by Marv Levy, who also used a version of the no-huddle offense starting with the 1989 season. The Bengals had beaten the Bills three times in 1988 (pre-season, regular season, and the AFC Championship Game). Marv Levy threatened to fake injuries if the Bengals used the "no-huddle" in the AFC Championship. Wyche was notified that the commissioner had ordered the "no-huddle" illegal for the game. The official notified Wyche and the Bengals' team just two hours before the game kickoff. Wyche asked to talk directly to the commissioner and word immediately came back that the "no-huddle" would not be penalized. Levy did not have his players' fake injuries in the game but installed his version the next year, 1989. The Bengals first used the "no-huddle" in 1984. Most of the high-profile games (the various games for AFC titles and regular-season games) between the two led to these changes in NFL rules. Wyche also first used the timeout periods as an opportunity to bring his entire team to the sideline to talk to all eleven players, plus substitutes, at one time. This allowed trainers time to treat a cut or bruise and equipment managers time to repair an equipment defect.

=== West Coast offense ===
The West Coast offense is the popular name for the high-percentage passing scheme designed by former Bengals assistant Bill Walsh. Walsh formulated what has become popularly known as the West Coast offense during his tenure as assistant coach for the Cincinnati Bengals from 1968 to 1975, while working under the tutelage of Brown (and before embarking on his legendary coaching tenure with the San Francisco 49ers in the 1980s). Bengals quarterback Virgil Carter was the first player to successfully implement Walsh's system, leading the NFL in pass completion percentage in 1971. Ken Anderson replaced Carter as Cincinnati's starting quarterback in 1972 and was even more successful. In 1975 he would bring widespread recognition to the West Coast offense as well as to the Cincinnati team and its quarterback in a nationally televised Monday night contest between the Bengals and a Buffalo Bills team built around the running game of star player O. J. Simpson. Anderson's 447 passing yards were enough to overcome Simpson's 197 yards on the ground in a game that proved a milestone, providing a striking contrast between the "old" game of defense-minded football and the new game of higher scores and more action through a sophisticated aerial attack. The game, in effect, offered its viewers a glimpse of the future of professional football. Anderson, who was drafted by Paul Brown in 1971 and installed as starting quarterback in 1972, made four trips to the Pro Bowl, won four passing titles, was named NFL MVP in 1981, and set the record for completion percentage in a single season in 1982 with 70.66%. Defeated frequently during the 1970s by the Pittsburgh Steelers, a team that won four Super Bowls with 9 future Hall of Fame players, the Bengals under Anderson and head coach Forrest Gregg would finally break through the Steel Curtain, defeating the Steelers during both of their meetings in 1980 and again in 1981. Anderson, who had been named the "team franchise" by Bengal tight end Bob Trumpy, would ultimately prove his worth with a career record of 91 wins and 81 losses.

=== Zone blitz ===
The defense created to combat the West Coast offense also came from Cincinnati. Then-Bengals defensive coordinator Dick LeBeau (who later served as the team's head coach from 2000 to 2002) created the zone blitz in the 1980s in response to the West Coast offense.

== Players ==
=== Current roster ===
Cincinnati Bengals roster
Quarterbacks (QB): 9 Joe Burrow; 16 Joe Flacco; Running backs (RB): 25 Tahj Brooks; 30 Chase Brown; 34 Samaje Perine; Wide receivers (WR): 1 Ja'Marr Chase; 5 Tee Higgins; 81 Dohnte Meyers PR; 82 Mitchell Tinsley; 86 Colbie Young; Tight ends (TE): 84 Jack Endries; 88 Mike Gesicki; 85 Cam Grandy; 89 Drew Sample	Offensive linemen (OL): 69 Jacob Bayer C; 75 Orlando Brown T; 63 Dylan Fairchild G; 73 Javon Foster T; 77 Myles Hinton T; 64 Ted Karras C; 65 Connor Lew C; 71 Amarius Mims T; 66 Dalton Risner G; 74 Jalen Rivers G; Defensive linemen (DL): 93 Jonathan Allen DT; 92 B. J. Hill DT; 90 Kris Jenkins Jr. DT; 52 Cedric Johnson DE; 97 Dexter Lawrence DT; 53 Boye Mafe DE; 99 Myles Murphy DE; 96 Landon Robinson DT; 98 Tedarrell Slaton DT; 94 Shemar Stewart DE	Linebackers (LB): 49 Barrett Carter; 43 Joe Giles-Harris; 44 Demetrius Knight; 45 Jack Kiser; Defensive backs (DB): 27 Jordan Battle S; 6 Bryan Cook S; 20 Tacario Davis CB; 29 Kyle Dugger S; 23 Daxton Hill CB; 38 D. J. Ivey CB; 37 P. J. Jules S; 28 Josh Newton CB; 0 DJ Turner CB; 22 Russ Yeast S; Special teams (ST): 2 Evan McPherson K; 8 Ryan Rehkow P; 46 William Wagner LS	Practice squad: 33 Beau Brade S; 24 Trikweze Bridges CB; 31 Kentrel Bullock RB; 4 Sean Clifford QB; 95 Howard Cross III DT; 51 Isaiah Foskey DE; 50 Emany Johnson LB; 21 Bralyn Lux CB; 36 Kendall Milton RB; 14 Jordan Moore WR; 41 Caden Prieskorn TE; 56 Garmon Randolph DE; 17 Noah Thomas WR; 12 Ke'Shawn Williams WR; Reserve: 83 Erick All TE (IR); 47 Swayze Bozeman LB (IR); 42 Oren Burks LB (IR); 35 Jalen Davis CB (IR); 55 Cashius Howell DE (IR); 87 Tanner Hudson TE (IR); 80 Andrei Iosivas WR (IR); 48 Josh Kattus TE (PS/I); 62 Brian Parker II G (IR); 26 Ja'Sir Taylor CB (IR) 51 active, 14 practice squad, 10 reserve As of November 21, 2026. Rookies in italics.; Roster; Depth chart; Transactions

=== Retired numbers ===
Cincinnati Bengals retired numbers
No.	Player	Position	Seasons	Retired
54	Bob Johnson	C	1968–79	December 17, 1978

In addition, despite not being formally retired, the Bengals have certain numbers that are in limited circulation:

- 13 Has only been worn once (in 2000, by Daniel Pope) since the retirement of Ken Riley.
- 14 Has not been worn since Andy Dalton after he was released in 2019. 14 was also worn by Ken Anderson from 1971 to 1986, arguably the best Bengals quarterback of all time.
- 78 Has not been worn by anyone since Anthony Muñoz retired.

=== Pro Football Hall of Fame members ===
There are four members of the Hall of Fame that have spent some portion of their career with the Bengals, but only Anthony Muñoz and Ken Riley spent their entire playing careers with the Bengals. Listed below are only Hall of Famers whose induction includes their tenure with the Bengals. Bengals founder and first coach Paul Brown is in the Hall of Fame, but was inducted before founding the team and is not credited as a Bengals Hall of Famer. Additionally, the Bengals have had two head coaches, Forrest Gregg and Dick LeBeau inducted for their playing career.

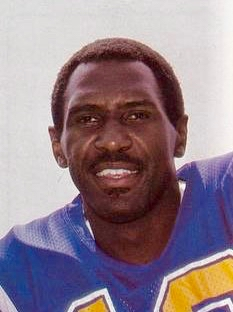
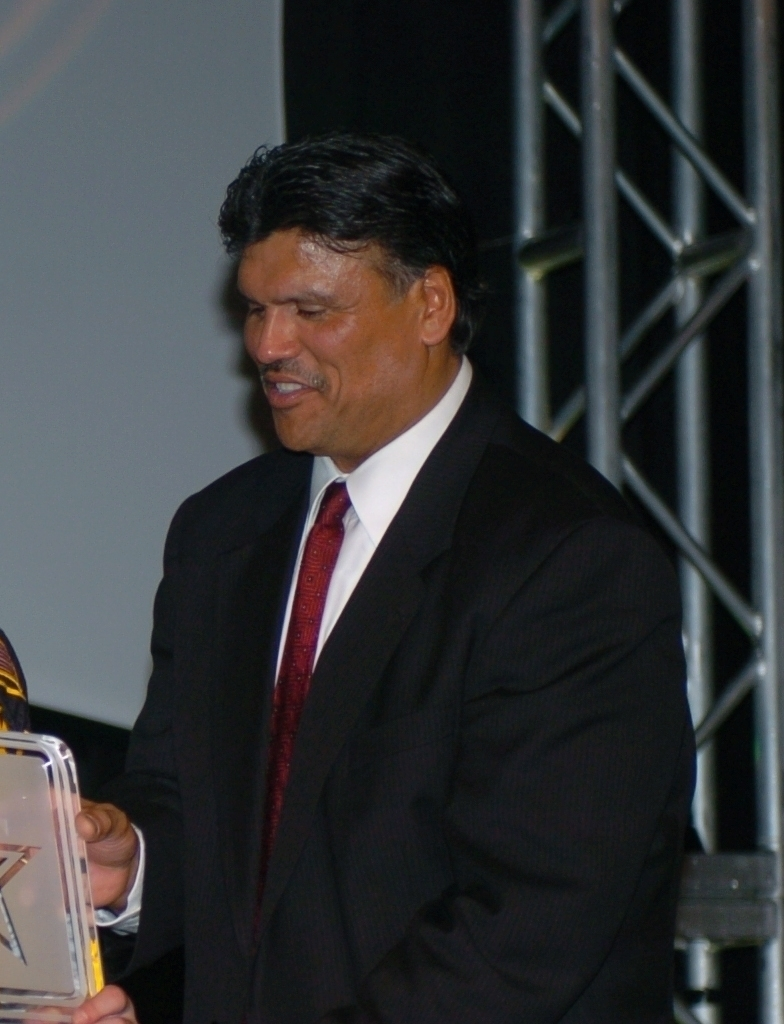
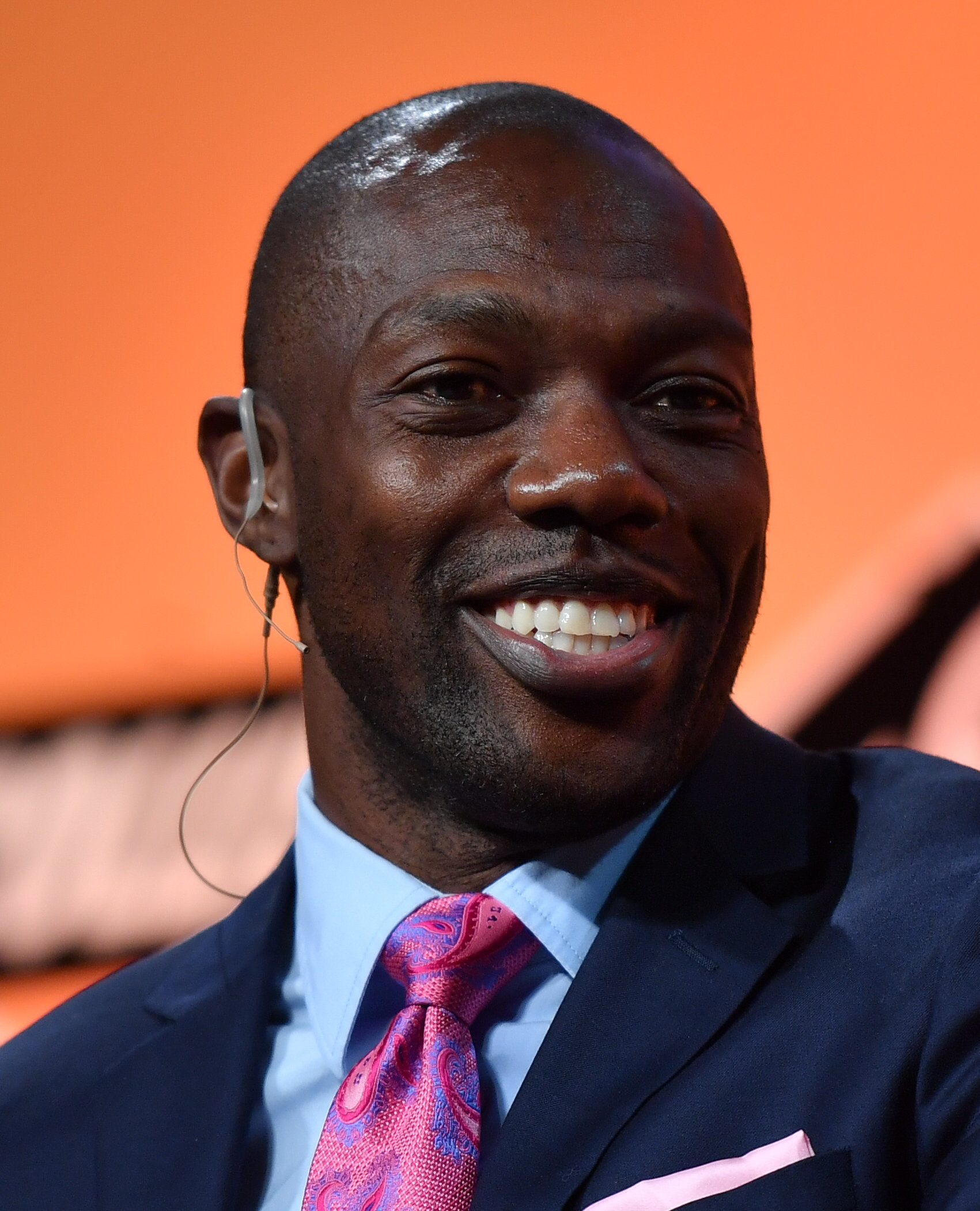
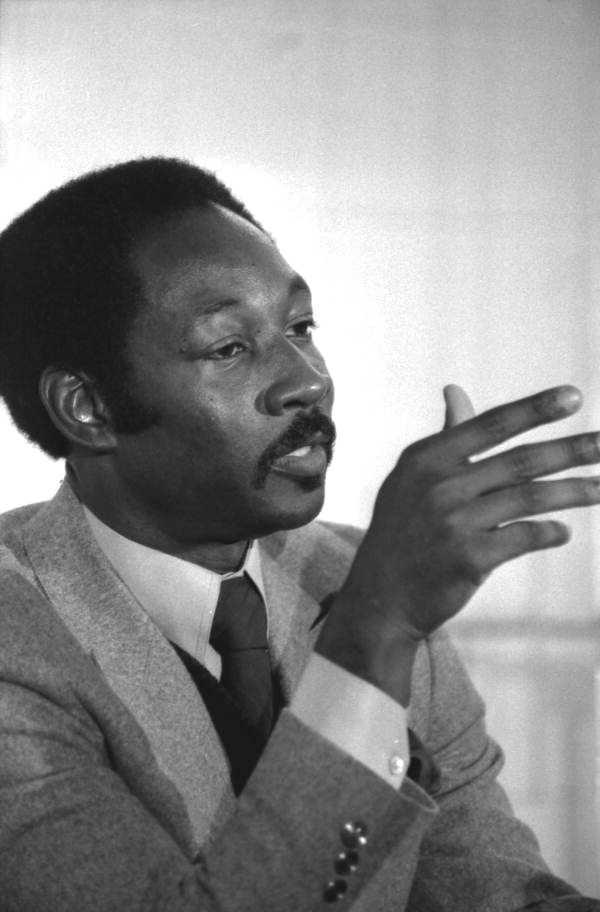
Charlie Joiner (left), Anthony Muñoz (center-left), Terrell Owens (center-right), and Ken Riley (right) are the only members of the Hall of Fame to have played for the Bengals. Owens and Joiner spent the majority of their careers with other teams, while Muñoz and Riley spent their entire career with the Bengals.

Cincinnati Bengals Hall of Famers
Players
No.	Name	Position	Season(s)	Inducted
18	Charlie Joiner	WR	1972–1975	1996
78	Anthony Muñoz	OT	1980–1992	1998
81	Terrell Owens	WR	2010	2018
13	Ken Riley	CB	1969–1983	2023

=== Cincinnati Bengals individual awards ===
NFL MVP Winners
Season	Player	Position
1981	Ken Anderson	QB
1988	Boomer Esiason	QB

AFL/NFL Rookie of the Year
Season	Player	Position
1968	Paul Robinson	RB
1969	Greg Cook	QB
1985	Eddie Brown	WR
1992	Carl Pickens	WR
2021	Ja'Marr Chase	WR

Comeback Player of the Year
Season	Player	Position
2003	Jon Kitna	QB
2021	Joe Burrow	QB
2024	Joe Burrow	QB

Maxwell Club NFL Coach of the Year
Season	Coach
1969	Paul Brown
1970	Paul Brown
2009	Marvin Lewis

Walter Payton NFL Man of the Year
Season	Player	Position
1975	Ken Anderson	QB
1986	Reggie Williams	OLB
1991	Anthony Muñoz	OT

=== 40th Anniversary Team ===
In 2007, in celebration of their 40th anniversary the Bengals named an all-time team voted on by the fans.

Position	Player	Tenure
Offense
QB	Carson Palmer	2003–2010
RB	James Brooks	1984–1991
FB	Ickey Woods	1988–1991
WR	Chad Johnson	2001–2010
WR	T. J. Houshmandzadeh	2001–2008
TE	Dan Ross	1979–1983, 1985
OT	Anthony Muñoz	1980–1992
OT	Willie Anderson	1996–2007
G	Max Montoya	1979–1989
G	Dave Lapham	1974–1983
C	Rich Braham	1994–2006
Defense
DE	Justin Smith	2001–2007
DE	Ross Browner	1978–1986
DT	Tim Krumrie	1983–1994
DT	Mike Reid	1970–1974
LB	Reggie Williams	1976–1989
LB	Takeo Spikes	1998–2002
LB	Brian Simmons	1998–2006
CB	Ken Riley	1969–1983
CB	Lemar Parrish	1970–1977
S	David Fulcher	1986–1992
S	Solomon Wilcots	1987–1990
Special teams
K	Shayne Graham	2003–2009
P	Lee Johnson	1988–1989

=== 50th Anniversary Team ===
In 2017, in celebration of their 50th anniversary, a team was created based on "career statistics, team records and votes from the Bengals First 50."

Position	Player	Tenure
Offense
QB	Boomer Esiason	1984–1992, 1997
QB	Ken Anderson	1971–1986
RB	Corey Dillon	1997–2003
FB	Pete Johnson	1977–1983
WR	Chad Johnson	2001–2010
WR	Isaac Curtis	1973–1984
WR	Cris Collinsworth	1981–1988
TE	Bob Trumpy	1968–1977
OT	Anthony Muñoz	1980–1992
OT	Willie Anderson	1996–2007
G	Max Montoya	1979–1989
G	Dave Lapham	1974–1983
C	Bob Johnson	1968–1979
Defense
DE	Eddie Edwards	1977–1988
DE	Coy Bacon	1976–1977
DT	Tim Krumrie	1983–1994
DT	Mike Reid	1970–1974
LB	Reggie Williams	1976–1989
LB	Bill Bergey	1969–1973
LB	Jim LeClair	1972–1983
CB	Ken Riley	1969–1983
CB	Lemar Parrish	1970–1977
S	David Fulcher	1986–1992
S	Tommy Casanova	1972–1977
Special teams
K	Jim Breech	1980–1992
P	Pat McInally	1984–1991
Coach
HC	Forrest Gregg	1980–1983
HC	Sam Wyche	1984–1991

=== Ring of Honor ===
The Bengals announced they would begin a Ring of Honor in 2021. The inaugural class included Pro Football Hall of Fame left tackle Anthony Muñoz and Paul Brown, who was the franchise's founder and first coach, with Ken Anderson and Ken Riley added after a season ticket holder vote.

Pro Football Hall of Fame finalist
Inducted or Enshrined in the Pro Football Hall of Fame

Bengals Ring of Honor
Inducted	No.	Player	Position	Tenure
2021	78	Anthony Muñoz	OT	1980–1992
2021	–	Paul Brown*	Founder; Owner; Coach	N/A; 1968–1991; 1968–1975
2021	14	Ken Anderson	QB	1971–1986
2021	13	Ken Riley*	CB	1969–1983
2022	71	Willie Anderson	OT	1996–2007
2022	85	Isaac Curtis	WR	1973–1984
2023	7	Boomer Esiason	QB	1984–1992, 1997
2023	85	Chad Johnson	WR	2001–2010
2024	28	Corey Dillon	RB	1997–2003
2024	69	Tim Krumrie	NT	1983–1994
2025	20	Lemar Parrish	CB	1970–1977
2025	62	Dave Lapham	G	1974–1983
2026	21	James Brooks	HB	1984-1991
2026	84	Bob Trumpy*	TE	1968-1977

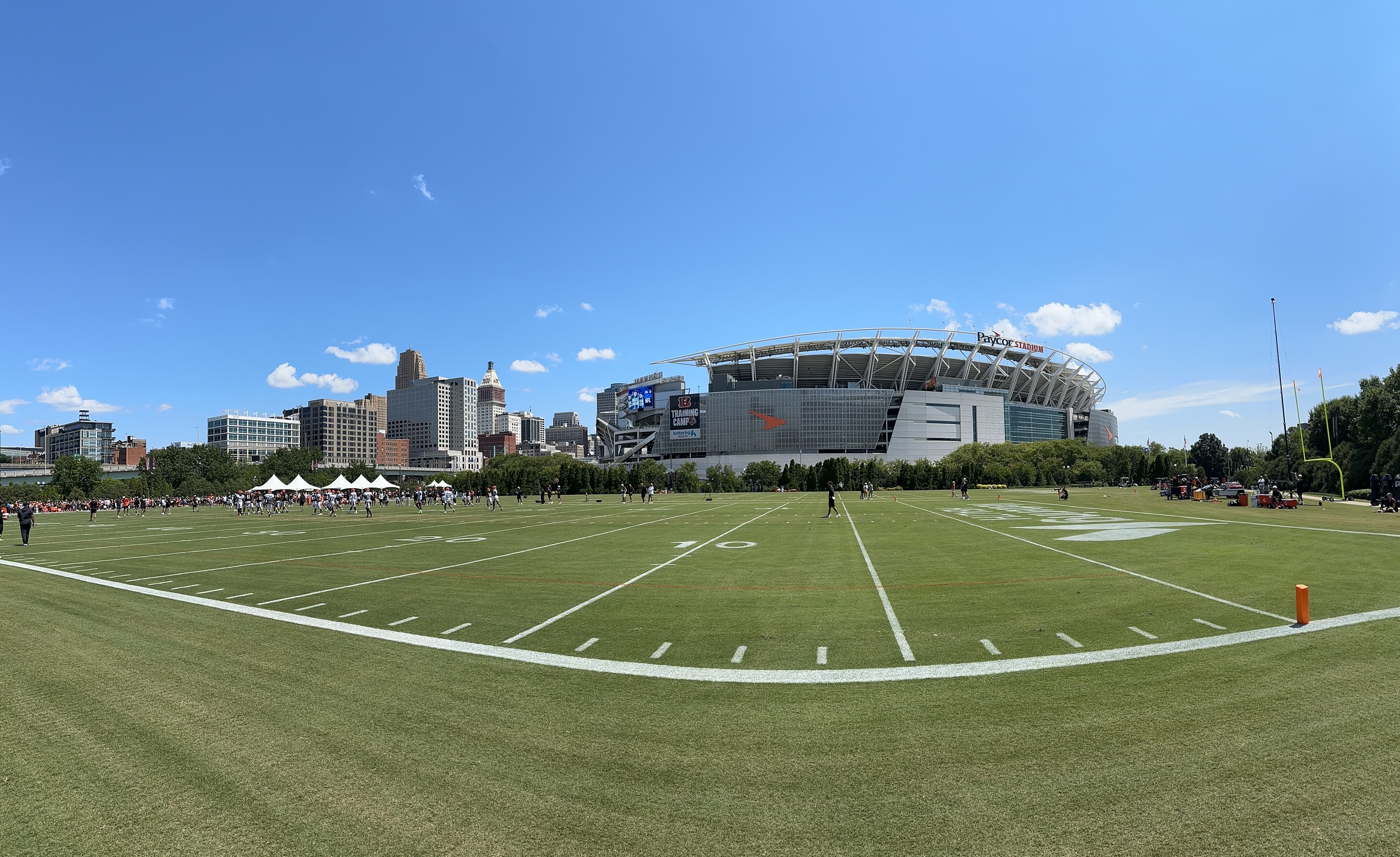
Kettering Health Bengals Practice Fields, where the Cincinnati Bengals practice

*Posthumous induction

== Coaching staff ==
=== Current staff ===
Cincinnati Bengals staff
Front office: Owner/president – Mike Brown; Executive vice president – Katie Blackburn; Vice president – Troy Blackburn; Vice president of player personnel – Paul H. Brown; Director of player personnel – Duke Tobin; Assistant general manager – Trey Brown; Assistant general manager – Mike Potts; Assistant general manager – Steven Radicivec; Scouting executive – Andrew Johnson; Director of football research – Sam Francis; Head coach: Head coach – Zac Taylor; Assistant head coach/special teams coordinator – Darrin Simmons; Offensive coaches: Offensive coordinator – Dan Pitcher; Passing game coordinator – Justin Rascati; Quarterbacks – Brad Kragthorpe; Assistant quarterbacks – Jordan Salkin; Running backs – Justin Hill; Wide receivers – Troy Walters; Assistant wide receivers – Davis Koetter; Tight ends/run game coordinator – James Casey; Offensive line – Scott Peters; Assistant offensive line – Michael McCarthy	Defensive coaches: Defensive coordinator – Al Golden; Defensive line/run game coordinator – Jerry Montgomery; Assistant defensive line – Mike Moon; Linebackers – Michael Hodges; Assistant linebackers – Ronnie Regula; Secondary/cornerbacks – Charles Burks; Secondary/safeties – Jordan Kovacs; Senior defensive assistant – Sean Desai; Special teams coaches: Assistant special teams – Ben Jacobs; Strength and conditioning: Strength and conditioning – Joey Boese; Assistant strength and conditioning – Todd Hunt; Assistant strength and conditioning – Garrett Swanson; Football operations: Chief of coaching staff – Doug Rosfeld; → Coaching staff → Front office → More NFL staffs

== Radio and television ==
The Bengals contract with iHeartMedia as their radio partner, with their flagship radio stations being WCKY (1530) and WEBN (102.7 FM), along with WLW (700) if not in conflict with the Reds. Most preseason and regular season games with them hosting an NFC opponent, are telecast on WXIX-TV, channel 19, the Fox affiliate. They also air games streaming on Amazon Prime Video and YouTube. Mike Watts and Anthony Muñoz are the TV announcers for preseason games, with Mike Valpredo as the sideline reporter. Most regular season games are televised on WKRC-TV, channel 12, the local CBS affiliate. They also air games streaming on Netflix alongside CBS games. NBC affiliate WLWT-TV airs games when the Bengals are featured on Sunday Night Football and Monday Night Football broadcasts not on ABC. ABC affiliate WCPO-TV airs it otherwise.

The radio broadcasting crew consists of Dan Hoard (play-by-play), and Dave Lapham (analyst).

== Culture ==
=== Fight song ===
"The Bengal Growl" is the Bengals fight song. It was written by Bengals entertainment director George "Red" Bird upon the team's founding in 1968. Bird had been friends with Paul Brown for over 30 years. The two had met at Massillon Washington High School when Brown was head football coach and Bird was director of the famed Massillon Tiger Swing Band. Bird had served as the Browns' music and entertainment director in 1946, and kept that role until Brown convinced him to come to Cincinnati in 1968. His first task was to pen a fight song along the lines of the Browns' fight song, "Hi! O-Hi-O for Cleveland!" The song remains very popular among Bengals fans, who are known to belt out the song at "Bengals backer" bars all over the country. In 2021, Elizabeth Blackburn, now the team's head of strategy and fan engagement, told The Athletic recalled stopping at one such bar in San Francisco during the 2015 playoffs, and was surprised to hear the viewers break out into the song. As a measure of how popular the song remains among the Bengals fan base, when Blackburn wrote an editorial on her efforts to overhaul the team's image for the Bengals Web site, Blackburn specifically mentioned that the song was not going anywhere. "Welcome to the Jungle" is also a fight song for the Bengals. The song is mainly played before kickoffs to intimidate visiting teams.

=== Who Dey chant ===
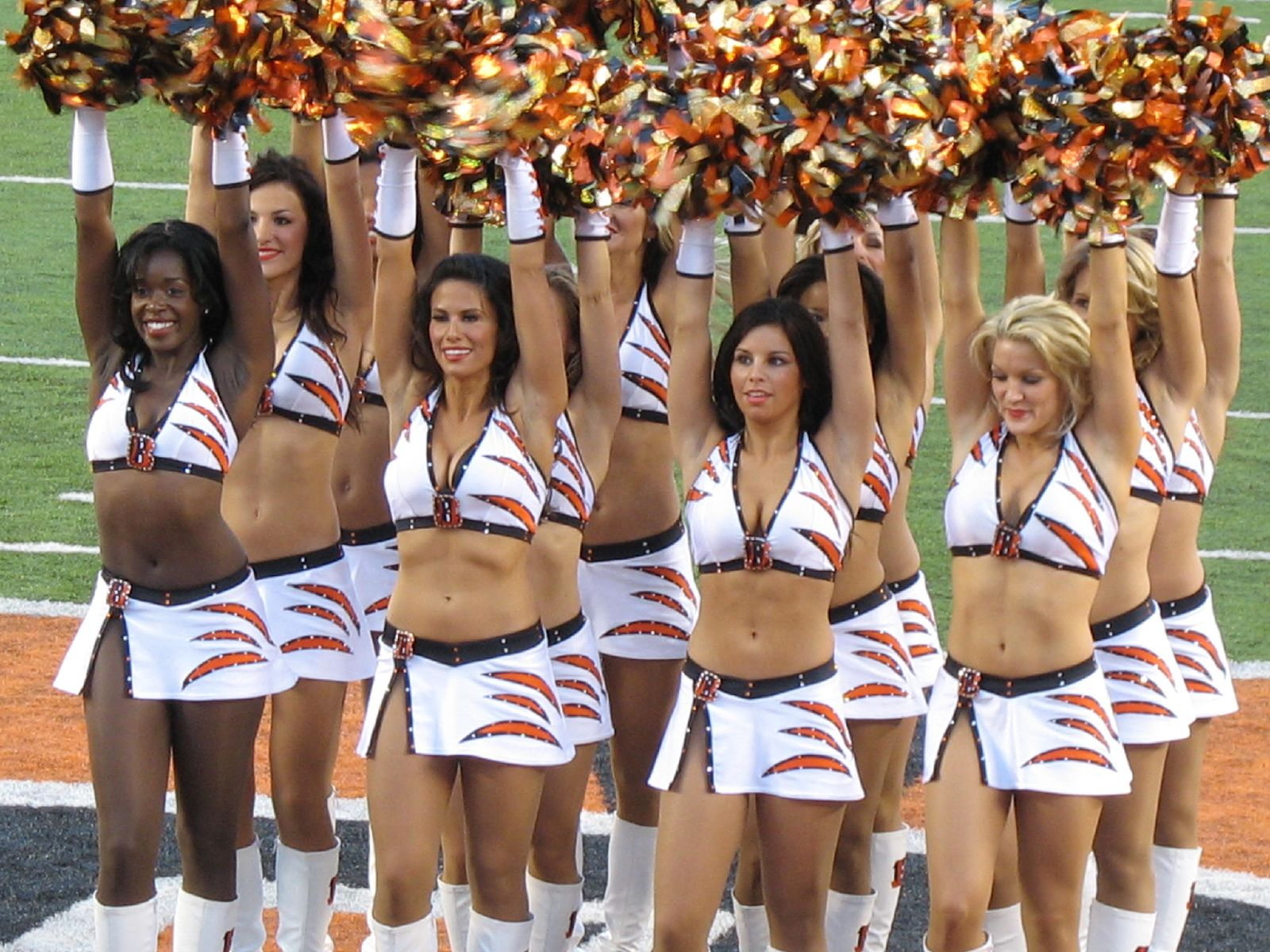
Bengals Cheerleaders leading a cheer.

"Who Dey?!" is the name of a chant of support by fans of the Cincinnati Bengals, in use since the 1980s. The entire chant is: "Who dey, who dey, who dey think gonna beat dem Bengals?" The answer screamed in unison, "Nobody." Sometimes fans will instead shout "Who Dey?" to represent the entire cheer. "Who Dey" is also the name of the team's mascot, a Bengal tiger.

Saying "Who Dey" at Bengals games is steeped in local beer lore. Hudy, a leading product of Hudepohl Brewing Company 1978 through the late 1980s, bears a phonetic similarity to the "Who Dey" chant. Beer vendors who carried full cases of bottled local beer up and down the steep upper stairs of what was then Riverfront Stadium would call out "If Hudy", "Burger" and other local beer names. Raucous fans would often chant back and forth with them as the vendors called out. During the 1980 season, the banter with the Hudepohl vendors grew organically into the now famous (Hu-Dey) -Who They?- chant.

The full Who Dey chant was first known to be used by fans of the 1980 Cincinnati Bengals. While the origin of the chant is disputed, one possible source for the chant is a 1980 commercial for (the now-defunct) Red Frazier Ford of Cincinnati, which used this tagline: "Who's going to give you a better deal than Red Frazier?...Nobody!" Cincinnati fans who had seen the commercial many times may have just copied it when cheering.

The chant bears some similarities to the phrase "Who Dat?", which was officially adopted by the New Orleans Saints in 1983 but had been used by Louisiana's high school team fans for some time. The saying "Who Dat?" originated in minstrel shows and vaudeville acts in the late 19th and early 20th centuries, then it was taken up by New Orleans Jazz and various Big band folks in the 1920s and 1930s. In the late 1960s, local Louisiana High Schools, St. Augustine High School and Patterson High School reportedly have been using the cheer and Gulf Coast fans of Alcorn State University and Louisiana State University picked up the cheer in the 1970s. Southern University in Baton Rouge, Louisiana claims to have originated the cheer in the late 1960s in their version: "Who dat talking 'bout beating dem Jags?"

== See also ==
- List of Cincinnati Bengals seasons
- List of NFL team records
- Sports in Ohio
- Sports in Cincinnati
