= Maurice M. Black =

- Born: May 3, 1918; Cleveland, OH
- Died: September 14, 1996 (aged 78); New York, NY
- Occupation: Physician

Maurice M. Black (May 3, 1918 – September 14, 1996) was a pathologist who was an expert on breast cancer.

== Biography ==
Black was born in Cleveland; he received his bachelor's degree from Long Island University (1938) and his medical degree in 1943 from New York Medical College (1943). During World War II, he was an officer in the Army Medical Corps and received the Silver Star and three battle stars

He taught pathology from 1958 to 1990 at New York Medical College in Valhalla, N.Y. He was the director of the Medical College's Institute for Breast Diseases for two decades and was subsequently affiliated with New York Methodist Hospital in Brooklyn. He published more than 250 studies.

== Career ==
In 1953, he published with Francis D. Speer a study in the New York State Journal of Medicine declaring that "ultraradical surgical attempts to cure breast cancer are not consistent with the biology of the disease." He co-authored two books, Human Cancer (1957) and Dynamic Pathology: Structural and Functional Mechanisms of Disease (1964).
