= Maurice Black (Mississippi politician) =

American politician

Maurice Rudolph Black
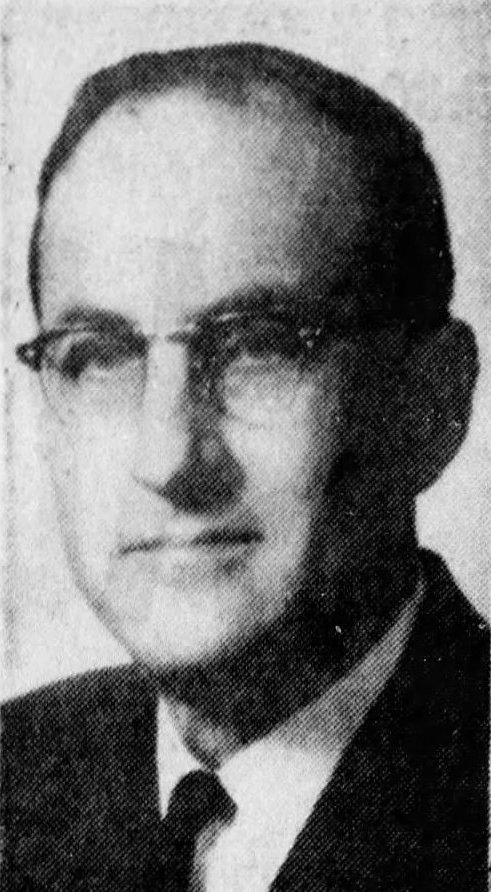
- Black circa 1962

Member of the Mississippi House of Representatives
- In office 1948–1964

Assistant Attorney-General of Mississippi
- In office 1969–1977

Personal details
- Born: October 18, 1915 Madison County, Mississippi
- Died: September 16, 2000 (aged 84) Flora, Mississippi
- Cause of death: Parkinson's disease
- Resting place: Flora City Cemetery
- Education: Flora High School; Hinds Junior College; Millsaps College; Belhaven College; Jackson School of Law

Maurice Rudolph Black (October 18, 1915 – September 16, 2000) was an American politician from Mississippi. Black served in the Mississippi House of Representatives from 1948 to 1964.

Black was born on October 18, 1915, in Madison County, Mississippi. He graduated from Hinds Junior College in 1935, then attended Millsaps College. He earned a law degree from Jackson School of Law in 1938. He was elected to the Mississippi House of Representatives in 1947 and took office in 1948. He served in that role through 1964. In 1969, he was appointed as assistant attorney-general. He retired from this role in 1977.

Black died on September 16, 2000, at his home in Flora, Mississippi from complications due to Parkinson's disease.
