= 1998 Cincinnati Bengals season =

NFL team season

- Owner: Mike Brown
- Head coach: Bruce Coslet
- Home stadium: Cinergy Field

Results
- Record: 3–13
- Division place: 5th AFC Central
- Playoffs: Did not qualify
- Pro Bowlers: None

The 1998 season was the Cincinnati Bengals' 31st in professional football and their 29th in the National Football League (NFL). The Bengals finished with a 3–13 record for the fourth time in the 1990s, as new free agent quarterback Neil O'Donnell was sacked 30 times. Despite the poor showing by the offensive line, running back Corey Dillon established himself as one of the NFL's premier running backs, as he rushed for 1,120 yards. The only bright spot for the Bengals in 1998 was when they swept division rival Pittsburgh. This was the Bengals only sweep of the Steelers during the "Bungles" years.

== Offseason ==
=== NFL draft ===
The Bengals drafted nine players in 1998.

1998 Cincinnati Bengals draft
Round	Pick	Player	Position	College	Notes
1	13	Takeo Spikes *	Linebacker	Auburn	
1	17	Brian Simmons	Linebacker	North Carolina	
2	43	Artrell Hawkins	Cornerback	Cincinnati	
3	75	Steve Foley	Linebacker	Louisiana–Monroe	
3	78	Mike Goff	Guard	Iowa	
4	105	Glen Steele	Defensive tackle	Michigan	
6	167	Jason Tucker	Wide receiver	TCU	
7	202	Marcus Parker	Running back	Virginia Tech	
7	222	Damian Vaughn	Tight end	Miami (OH)	
Made roster * Made at least one Pro Bowl during career

=== Undrafted free agents ===
1998 undrafted free agents of note
Player	Position	College
Alonzo Clayton	Wide receiver	Northern Iowa
Brad Costello	Punter	Boston University
Mike Doughty	Tackle	Notre Dame
Damon Gibson	Wide receiver	Iowa
Daryle Heidelburg	Wide receiver	Jackson State
Jeff Leonard	Defensive end	Wyoming
Derrick LeVake	Tackle	Wisconsin–Whitewater
Adrian Luster	Defensive Tackle	The Citadel
Ric Mathias	Cornerback	Wisconsin–La Crosse
Jason Moore	Safety	San Diego State
Kevin Moore	Safety	Morgan State
Buddy Rodgers	Fullback	Maryland
Adrian Ross	Linebacker	Colorado State
Erik Storz	Linebacker	Boston College

== Personnel ==
=== Staff ===
1998 Cincinnati Bengals staff
Front office: President – Mike Brown; Head coaches: Head coach – Bruce Coslet; Assistant head coach/defensive coordinator – Dick LeBeau; Offensive coaches: Offensive coordinator – Ken Anderson; Running backs – Jim Anderson; Tight ends – Bob Wylie; Offensive line – Paul Alexander; Offensive staff assistant – John Garrett	Defensive coaches: Defensive line – Tim Krumrie; Linebackers – Mark Duffner; Defensive backs – Ray Horton; Defensive staff assistant – Louie Cioffi; Special teams coaches: Special teams – Al Roberts; Strength and conditioning: Strength and conditioning – Kim Wood

=== Roster ===
1998 Cincinnati Bengals roster
Quarterbacks (QB): 10 Paul Justin; 15 Eric Kresser; Running backs (RB): 36 Brandon Bennett; 21 Eric Bieniemy; 28 Corey Dillon; 46 Clif Groce; 44 Brian Milne FB; 45 Ray Zellars; Wide receivers (WR): 84 Damon Gibson; 85 James Hundon; 80 Willie Jackson; 81 Carl Pickens; 86 Darnay Scott; 87 Stepfret Williams; Tight ends (TE): 89 Marco Battaglia; 88 Steve Bush; 82 Tony McGee	Offensive linemen (OL): 71 Willie Anderson T; 65 Darrick Brilz C; 75 Anthony Brown G; 63 Mike Goff G; 62 Brock Gutierrez C; 60 Rod Jones G; 64 Rod Payne C; 77 Kevin Sargent T; 68 Scott Shaw G; Defensive linemen (DL): 90 Michael Bankston DE; 92 John Copeland DE; 94 Jevon Langford DE; 97 Andre Purvis NT; 96 Clyde Simmons DE; 93 Mike Thompson NT; 67 Kimo von Oelhoffen NT	Linebackers (LB): 98 Canute Curtis OLB; 95 Steve Foley OLB; 50 James Francis OLB; 91 Billy Granville ILB; 57 Adrian Ross OLB; 56 Brian Simmons ILB; 51 Takeo Spikes ILB; 52 Jimmy Sprotte ILB; 55 Reinard Wilson OLB; Defensive backs (DB): 33 Ashley Ambrose CB; 40 Myron Bell SS; 37 Roosevelt Blackmon CB; 27 Artrell Hawkins CB; 29 Kelvin Moore FS; 31 Greg Myers FS; 20 Thomas Randolph CB; 35 Sam Shade SS; Special teams (ST): 6 Brad Costello P; 9 Doug Pelfrey K; 59 Greg Truitt LS	Practice squad: 76 Mike Doughty T (IR); 24 Ric Mathias CB; 52 Tim Terry LB; 49 Damian Vaughn TE; -- Cory Withrow C; 42 Lawrence Wright S; Reserve: 8 Jeff Blake QB (IR); 66 Ken Blackman G (IR); 74 Rich Braham G (IR); 32 Ki-Jana Carter RB (IR); 16 Alonzo Clayton WR (IR); 34 Tremain Mack CB (Left squad); 12 Neil O'Donnell QB (IR); 23 Corey Sawyer CB (IR); 70 Glen Steele DE (IR); 53 Tom Tumulty LB (IR); 53 active, 11 inactive, 5 practice squad Rookies in italics

== Regular season ==
=== Schedule ===
Week	Date	Opponent	Result	Record	Venue	Attendance
1	September 6	**Tennessee Oilers**	**L** 14–23	0–1	Cinergy Field	55,848
2	September 13	at Detroit Lions	**W** 34–28 (OT)	1–1	Pontiac Silverdome	66,354
3	September 20	Green Bay Packers	**L** 6–13	1–2	Cinergy Field	56,346
4	September 27	at **Baltimore Ravens**	**L** 24–31	1–3	Ravens Stadium at Camden Yards	68,154
5	Bye					
6	October 11	**Pittsburgh Steelers**	**W** 25–20	2–3	Cinergy Field	59,979
7	October 18	at **Tennessee Oilers**	**L** 14–44	2–4	Vanderbilt Stadium	33,288
8	October 25	at Oakland Raiders	**L** 10–27	2–5	Network Associates Coliseum	40,089
9	November 1	Denver Broncos	**L** 26–33	2–6	Cinergy Field	59,974
10	November 8	at **Jacksonville Jaguars**	**L** 11–24	2–7	Alltel Stadium	67,040
11	November 15	at Minnesota Vikings	**L** 3–24	2–8	Hubert H. Humphrey Metrodome	64,232
12	November 22	**Baltimore Ravens**	**L** 13–20	2–9	Cinergy Field	52,571
13	November 29	**Jacksonville Jaguars**	**L** 17–34	2–10	Cinergy Field	55,432
14	December 6	Buffalo Bills	**L** 20–33	2–11	Cinergy Field	54,359
15	December 13	at Indianapolis Colts	**L** 26–39	2–12	RCA Dome	55,179
16	December 20	at **Pittsburgh Steelers**	**W** 25–24	3–12	Three Rivers Stadium	52,017
17	December 27	Tampa Bay Buccaneers	**L** 0–35	3–13	Cinergy Field	49,826
Note: Intra-division opponents are in **bold** text.

=== Standings ===
AFC Central
	W	L	T	PCT	PF	PA	STK
^{(3)} Jacksonville Jaguars	11	5	0	.688	392	338	W1
Tennessee Oilers	8	8	0	.500	330	320	L2
Pittsburgh Steelers	7	9	0	.438	263	303	L5
Baltimore Ravens	6	10	0	.375	269	335	W1
Cincinnati Bengals	3	13	0	.188	268	452	L1

== Team leaders ==
=== Passing ===
Player	Att	Comp	Yds	TD	INT	Rating
Neil O'Donnell	343	212	2216	15	4	90.2

=== Rushing ===
Player	Att	Yds	YPC	Long	TD
Corey Dillon	262	1130	4.3	66	4

=== Receiving ===
Player	Rec	Yds	Avg	Long	TD
Carl Pickens	82	1023	12.5	67	5
Darnay Scott	51	817	16.0	70	7

=== Defensive ===
Player	Tackles	Sacks	INTs	FF	FR
Takeo Spikes	112	2.0	0	0	0
Reinard Wilson	63	6.0	0	2	0
Sam Shade	78	1.0	3	0	2
Artrell Hawkins	70	1.0	3	2	1

=== Kicking and punting ===
Player	FGA	FGM	FG%	XPA	XPM	XP%	Points
Doug Pelfrey	27	19	70.4%	21	21	100.0%	78

Player	Punts	Yards	Long	Blkd	Avg.
Lee Johnson	69	3083	69	1	44.7

=== Special teams ===
Player	KR	KRYards	KRAvg	KRLong	KRTD	PR	PRYards	PRAvg	PRLong	PRTD
Tremain Mack	45	1165	25.9	97	1	0	0	0.0	0	0
Damon Gibson	17	372	21.9	30	0	27	218	8.1	65	1

== Awards and records ==
- Carl Pickens, franchise record, most receptions in one game, 13 (achieved on October 11, 1998)

=== Milestones ===
- Corey Dillon, 2nd 1,000-yard rushing season (1,130 rushing yards)
- Carl Pickens, 4th 1,000-yard receiving season (1,023 receiving yards)
- Chad Cornelius, led NFL in punt average in the preseason before tearing the ACL/MCL on his kicking leg. Was the first punter to down his own punt.
