= 1999 Cincinnati Bengals season =

NFL team season

- Head coach: Bruce Coslet
- Home stadium: Cinergy Field

Results
- Record: 4–12
- Division place: 5th AFC Central
- Playoffs: Did not qualify
- Pro Bowlers: RB Corey Dillon

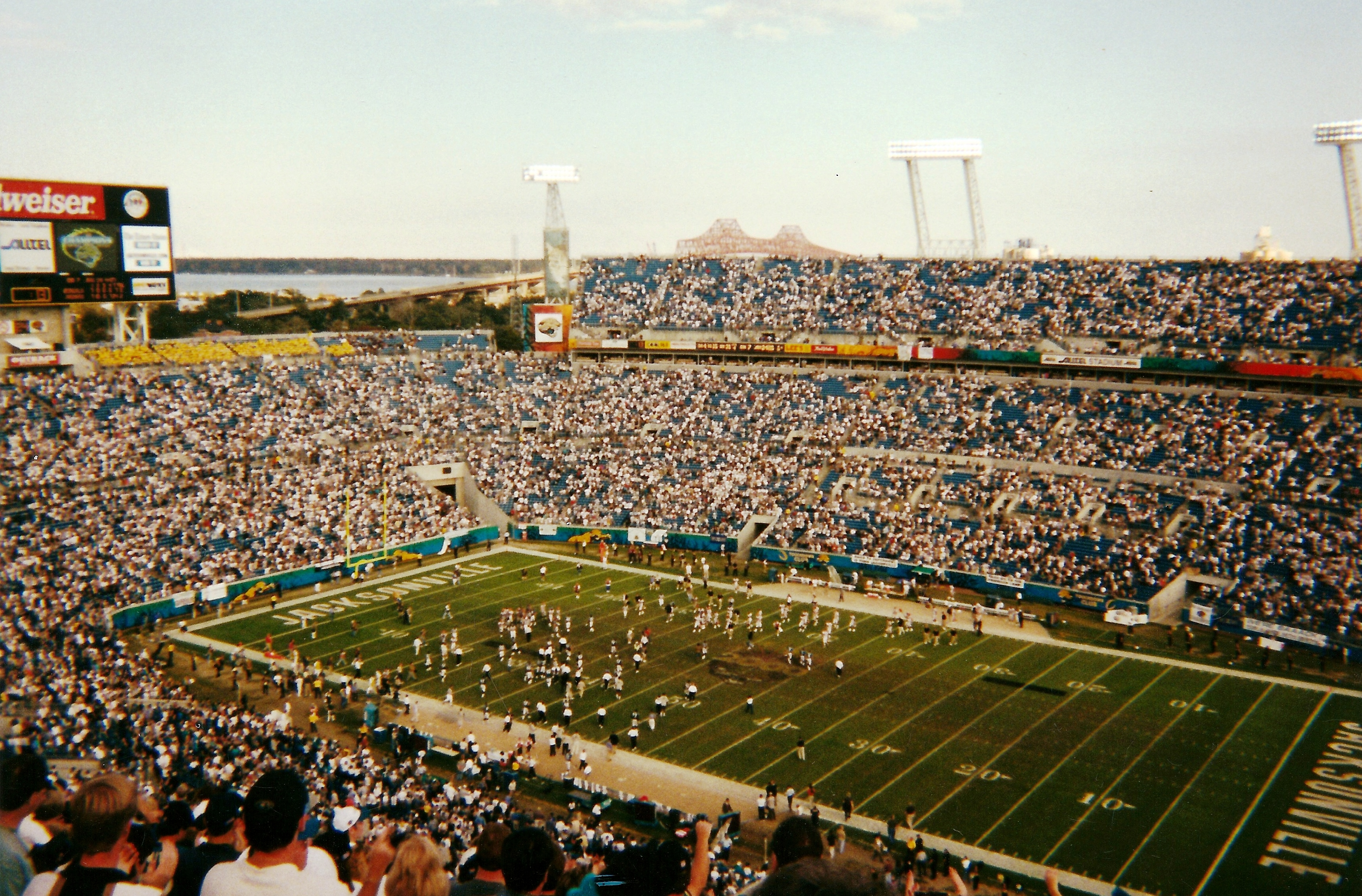
Jacksonville Jaguars vs. Cincinnati Bengals January 2, 2000

The 1999 Cincinnati Bengals season was the team's 32nd year in professional football and its 30th with the National Football League (NFL). In what would be the final season of pro football being played at Riverfront Stadium, then known as Cinergy Field, the Bengals struggled out of the gates again losing 10 of their first 11 games. After winning two straight, the Bengals faced the expansion Cleveland Browns in the final game at Riverfront Stadium. The Bengals would win the game 44–28 (Note: Coach Bruce Coslet took running back Corey Dillon out of that game in the third quarter even though he was on pace to break the league's single-game rushing record of 275 yards, set by the late Walter Payton almost 22 years before. Asked why afterwards, Coslet reminded reporters that Payton had set that record in a 10–7 game.) before losing their final two games to finish with a 4–12 record. The Bengals failed to beat a single team who had a winning record for the second consecutive season.

== Offseason ==
=== NFL draft ===
1999 Cincinnati Bengals draft
Round	Pick	Player	Position	College	Notes
1	3	Akili Smith	Quarterback	Oregon	
2	33	Charles Fisher	Defensive back	West Virginia	
3	65	Cory Hall	Defensive back	Fresno State	
4	98	Craig Yeast	Wide receiver	Kentucky	
5	135	Nick Luchey	Fullback	Miami (FL)	
6	173	Kelly Gregg	Defensive tackle	Oklahoma	
7	209	Tony Coats	Guard	Washington	
7	245	Scott Covington	Quarterback	Miami (FL)	
7	249	Donald Broomfield	Defensive tackle	Clemson	
Made roster

== Personnel ==
=== Staff ===
1999 Cincinnati Bengals staff
Front office: President – Mike Brown; Head coaches: Head coach – Bruce Coslet; Assistant head coach/defensive coordinator – Dick LeBeau; Offensive coaches: Offensive coordinator – Ken Anderson; Running backs – Jim Anderson; Wide receivers – Steve Mooshagian; Tight ends – Frank Verducci; Offensive line – Paul Alexander	Defensive coaches: Defensive line – Tim Krumrie; Linebackers – Mark Duffner; Defensive backs – Ray Horton; Defensive staff assistant – Louie Cioffi; Special teams coaches: Special teams – Al Roberts; Strength and conditioning: Strength and conditioning – Kim Wood

=== Roster ===
1999 Cincinnati Bengals roster
Quarterbacks (QB): 8 Jeff Blake; 4 Scott Covington; 15 Eric Kresser; 11 Akili Smith; Running backs (RB): 38 Michael Basnight; 28 Corey Dillon; 46 Clif Groce FB; 39 Nick Williams FB; 39 Sedrick Shaw; Wide receivers (WR): 87 Damon Griffin; 85 James Hundon; 80 Willie Jackson KR; 81 Carl Pickens; 86 Darnay Scott; 84 Craig Yeast PR; Tight ends (TE): 89 Marco Battaglia; 88 Steve Bush LS; 82 Tony McGee	Offensive linemen (OL): 71 Willie Anderson T; 74 Rich Braham C; 61 Tony Coats G; 63 Mike Goff G/T; 62 Brock Gutierrez C/G; 60 Rod Jones T; 58 Jay Leeuwenburg G; 72 Matt O'Dwyer G; 75 Jamain Stephens T; Defensive linemen (DL): 90 Michael Bankston DE; 92 John Copeland DE; 99 Oliver Gibson NT; 94 Jevon Langford DE; 97 Andre Purvis DE; 70 Glen Steele DE; 67 Kimo von Oelhoffen NT	Linebackers (LB): 98 Canute Curtis OLB; 95 Steve Foley OLB; 91 Billy Granville ILB; 57 Adrian Ross OLB; 56 Brian Simmons ILB; 51 Takeo Spikes ILB; 55 Reinard Wilson OLB; Defensive backs (DB): 33 JoJuan Armour SS; 40 Myron Bell SS; 21 Tom Carter CB; 26 Cory Hall FS; 27 Artrell Hawkins CB; 22 Rodney Heath CB; 20 Ty Howard CB; 34 Tremain Mack; 31 Greg Myers FS; 42 Lawrence Wright SS; Special teams (ST): 6 Brad Costello P; 9 Doug Pelfrey K	Practice squad: 79 Chad Pegues DT; 50 Ben Peterson LB; 83 Damian Vaughn TE; Reserve: 36 Brandon Bennett RB (IR); 37 Roosevelt Blackmon CB (IR); 32 Ki-Jana Carter RB (IR); 73 Brian DeMarco G (IR); 76 Mike Doughty T (IR); 25 Charles Fisher CB (IR); 24 Ric Mathias CB (IR); 29 Kelvin Moore S (IR); 59 Greg Truitt LS (IR); 53 Tom Tumulty LB (PUP); 53 active, 10 inactive, 3 practice squad Rookies in italics

== Regular season ==
=== Schedule ===
Week	Date	Opponent	Result	Record	Venue	Attendance
1	September 12	at **Tennessee Titans**	**L** 35–36	0–1	Adelphia Coliseum	65,272
2	September 19	San Diego Chargers	**L** 7–34	0–2	Cinergy Field	47,660
3	September 26	at Carolina Panthers	**L** 3–27	0–3	Ericcson Stadium	61,269
4	October 3	St. Louis Rams	**L** 10–38	0–4	Cinergy Field	45,481
5	October 10	at **Cleveland Browns**	**W** 18–17	1–4	Cleveland Browns Stadium	73,048
6	October 17	**Pittsburgh Steelers**	**L** 3–17	1–5	Cinergy Field	59,669
7	October 24	at Indianapolis Colts	**L** 10–31	1–6	RCA Dome	55,996
8	October 31	**Jacksonville Jaguars**	**L** 10–41	1–7	Cinergy Field	49,138
9	November 7	at Seattle Seahawks	**L** 20–37	1–8	Kingdome	66,303
10	November 14	**Tennessee Titans**	**L** 14–24	1–9	Cinergy Field	46,017
11	November 21	**Baltimore Ravens**	**L** 31–34	1–10	Cinergy Field	43,279
12	November 28	at **Pittsburgh Steelers**	**W** 27–20	2–10	Three Rivers Stadium	50,907
13	December 5	San Francisco 49ers	**W** 44–30	3–10	Cinergy Field	53,463
14	December 12	**Cleveland Browns**	**W** 44–28	4–10	Cinergy Field	59,972
15	Bye					
16	December 26	at **Baltimore Ravens**	**L** 0–22	4–11	PSINet Stadium	68,036
17	January 2, 2000	at **Jacksonville Jaguars**	**L** 7–24	4–12	Alltel Stadium	70,532
Note: Intra-division opponents are in **bold** text.

=== Standings ===
AFC Central
	W	L	T	PCT	PF	PA	STK
^{(1)} Jacksonville Jaguars	14	2	0	.875	396	217	W1
^{(4)} Tennessee Titans	13	3	0	.813	392	324	W4
Baltimore Ravens	8	8	0	.500	324	277	L1
Pittsburgh Steelers	6	10	0	.375	317	320	L1
Cincinnati Bengals	4	12	0	.250	283	460	L2
Cleveland Browns	2	14	0	.125	217	437	L6

== Team leaders ==
=== Passing ===
Player	Att	Comp	Yds	TD	INT	Rating
Jeff Blake	389	215	2670	16	12	77.6

=== Rushing ===
Player	Att	Yds	YPC	Long	TD
Corey Dillon	263	1200	4.6	50	5

=== Receiving ===
Player	Rec	Yds	Avg	Long	TD
Darnay Scott	68	1022	15.0	76	7

=== Defensive ===
Player	Tackles	Sacks	INTs	FF	FR
Brian Simmons	111	3.0	0	0	1
Michael Bankston	56	6.0	0	0	0
Rodney Heath	46	0.0	3	2	1

=== Kicking and punting ===
Player	FGA	FGM	FG%	XPA	XPM	XP%	Points
Doug Pelfrey	27	18	66.7%	27	27	100.0%	81

Player	Punts	Yards	Long	Blkd	Avg.
Will Brice	60	2475	72	2	41.3

=== Special teams ===
Player	KR	KRYards	KRAvg	KRLong	KRTD	PR	PRYards	PRAvg	PRLong	PRTD
Tremain Mack	51	1382	27.1	99	1	0	0	0.0	0	0
Damon Griffin	15	296	19.7	42	0	23	195	8.5	34	0

== Awards and records ==
=== Milestones ===
- Corey Dillon, 3rd 1000 yard rushing season (1,200 rushing yards)
- Darnay Scott, 1st 1000 yard receiving season (1,022 receiving yards)
