= 2000 Cincinnati Bengals season =

NFL team season

- Head coach: Bruce Coslet (resigned week 4, 0-3 record); Dick LeBeau (interim; 4-9 record)
- Home stadium: Paul Brown Stadium

Results
- Record: 4–12
- Division place: 5th AFC Central
- Playoffs: Did not qualify
- Pro Bowlers: RB Corey Dillon

The 2000 Cincinnati Bengals season was the team's 33rd year in professional football and its 31st with the National Football League. Corey Dillon would rank fifth in the NFL with 1,435 rushing yards and set a franchise record for most rushing yards in one season. On October 22, 2000, Dillon set a franchise record by rushing for 278 yards in one game. After being shut out in two of their first three games and a home loss to the Browns 24–7 in week 1, head coach Bruce Coslet resigned; he was replaced by former All-Pro Detroit Lions defensive back and Bengals defensive coordinator Dick LeBeau. Under LeBeau, the Bengals dropped their first three games, with an eventual long losing streak finally coming to an end on October 22 against the Denver Broncos at the new Paul Brown Stadium. The Bengals defeated the Broncos 31–21 as RB Corey Dillon set a single-game record by rushing for 278 yards. The Bengals used it as springboard to win their next game in Cleveland despite not scoring a touchdown. The Bengals offense would continue to struggle as 2nd year quarterback Akili Smith, the team's No. 1 draft pick out of Oregon, was overwhelmed by the NFL game. Corey Dillon set a team record by rushing for 1,435 yards, but with Smith's struggles as starting quarterback, the team floundered with a season-ending record of 4–12. They won only one game against a team with a winning record, which was a 31–21 win over the Broncos, who went 11–5 and made the playoffs.

== Offseason ==
Additions	Subtractions
DE Vaughn Booker (Packers)	QB Jeff Blake (Saints)
T John Jackson (Chargers)	WR Carl Pickens (Titans)
DT Tom Barndt (Chiefs)	S Myron Bell (Steelers)
S Darryl Williams (Seahawks)	G Jay Leeuwenburg (Redskins)
	DT Kimo von Oelhoffen (Steelers)

=== NFL draft ===
2000 Cincinnati Bengals draft
Round	Pick	Player	Position	College	Notes
1	4	Peter Warrick	Wide receiver	Florida State	
2	34	Mark Roman	Defensive back	LSU	
3	66	Ron Dugans	Wide receiver	Florida State	
4	97	Curtis Keaton	Running back	James Madison	
5	133	Robert Bean	Defensive back	Mississippi State	
6	169	Neil Rackers *	Placekicker	Illinois	
7	210	Brad St. Louis	Tight end	Southwest Missouri State	
Made roster * Made at least one Pro Bowl during career

=== Undrafted free agents ===
2000 undrafted free agents of note
Player	Position	College
LaVell Boyd	Wide receiver	Louisville
Ricky Brown	Fullback	Texas
Alan Buckwalter	Linebacker	Northwest Missouri State
Marvin Chalmers	Wide receiver	Wake Forest
Ben Clampitt	Wide receiver	Western Washington
Doug Dorley	Center	Bowling Green
Dave Fleischhauer	Defensive tackle	Penn State
Brian Gray	Defensive back	BYU
Eddie Hardaway	Wide receiver	C. W. Post
Tariq McDonald	Wide receiver	Arizona State
Roger Roesler	Guard	Texas
Gary Thompkins	Defensive back	West Virginia
Jeff Walker	Kicker	Mississippi State
Mike Willetts	Defensive end	Boston College

== Personnel ==
2000 Cincinnati Bengals staff
Front office: President – Mike Brown; Head coaches: Head coach – Bruce Coslet; Assistant head coach/defensive coordinator – Dick LeBeau; Offensive coaches: Offensive coordinator – Ken Anderson; Running backs – Jim Anderson; Wide receivers – Steve Mooshagian; Tight ends – Frank Verducci; Offensive line – Paul Alexander	Defensive coaches: Defensive line – Tim Krumrie; Linebackers – Mark Duffner; Defensive backs – Ray Horton; Defensive staff assistant – Louie Cioffi; Special teams coaches: Special teams – Al Roberts; Strength and conditioning: Strength and conditioning – Kim Wood

== Roster ==
2000 Cincinnati Bengals roster
Quarterbacks (QB): 4 Scott Covington; 19 Scott Mitchell; 11 Akili Smith; Running backs (RB): 36 Brandon Bennett; 28 Corey Dillon; 46 Clif Groce FB; 29 Curtis Keaton KR; 24 Sirr Parker; 30 Nick Williams FB; Wide receivers (WR): 85 LaVell Boyd; 81 Ron Dugans; 83 Danny Farmer; 87 Damon Griffin KR; 80 Peter Warrick PR; 84 Craig Yeast; Tight ends (TE): 89 Marco Battaglia; 88 Steve Bush	Offensive linemen (OL): 71 Willie Anderson T; 74 Rich Braham C; 76 Mike Doughty T; 63 Mike Goff G; 62 Brock Gutierrez C; 67 Craig Heimburger G; 65 John Jackson T; 60 Rod Jones T; 79 Scott Rehberg G; 61 Roger Roesler G; 75 Jamain Stephens T; Defensive linemen (DL): 90 Michael Bankston DE; 93 Tom Barndt DT; 92 John Copeland DE/DT; 99 Oliver Gibson DT; 94 Jevon Langford DE; 70 Glen Steele DT; 55 Reinard Wilson DE	Linebackers (LB): 98 Canute Curtis OLB; 95 Steve Foley OLB; 52 Billy Granville; 57 Adrian Ross MLB; 59 Armegis Spearman MLB; 51 Takeo Spikes OLB; Defensive backs (DB): 33 JoJuan Armour SS; 49 Robert Bean CB/S; 42 Chris Carter SS; 21 Tom Carter CB; 26 Cory Hall SS; 27 Artrell Hawkins CB; 34 Tremain Mack FS; 20 Mark Roman CB/S; 31 Darryl Williams FS; Special teams (ST): 13 Daniel Pope P; 5 Neil Rackers K; 48 Brad St. Louis LS	Practice squad: 44 Ricky Brown RB; -- Keith Jackson DT; 41 Kirk McMullen LS; 18 Chad Plummer WR; 43 Gary Thompkins S; Reserve: 38 Michael Basnight RB (IR); 96 Vaughn Booker DE (IR); 25 Charles Fisher CB (PUP); 22 Rodney Heath CB (IR); 82 Tony McGee TE (IR); 72 Matt O'Dwyer G (IR); 86 Darnay Scott WR (IR); 56 Brian Simmons LB (IR); Rookies in italics 53 active, 8 reserve, 5 practice squad

== Preseason ==
Week	Date	Opponent	Result	Record	Venue
1	August 4	at Buffalo Bills	L 20–21	0–1	Ralph Wilson Stadium
2	August 11	at Atlanta Falcons	L 16–31	0–2	Georgia Dome
3	August 19	Chicago Bears	W 24–20	1–2	Paul Brown Stadium
4	August 25	Detroit Lions	L 13–21	1–3	Paul Brown Stadium

== Regular season ==
=== Schedule ===
Week	Date	Opponent	Result	Record	Venue	Attendance
1	Bye					
2	September 10	**Cleveland Browns**	**L** 7–24	0–1	Paul Brown Stadium	64,006
3	September 17	at **Jacksonville Jaguars**	**L** 0–13	0–2	Alltel Stadium	45,653
4	September 24	at **Baltimore Ravens**	**L** 0–37	0–3	PSINet Stadium	68,481
5	October 1	Miami Dolphins	**L** 16–31	0–4	Paul Brown Stadium	61,535
6	October 8	**Tennessee Titans**	**L** 14–23	0–5	Paul Brown Stadium	63,406
7	October 15	at **Pittsburgh Steelers**	**L** 0–15	0–6	Three Rivers Stadium	54,328
8	October 22	Denver Broncos	**W** 31–21	1–6	Paul Brown Stadium	61,603
9	October 29	at **Cleveland Browns**	**W** 12–3	2–6	Cleveland Browns Stadium	73,118
10	November 5	**Baltimore Ravens**	**L** 7–27	2–7	Paul Brown Stadium	54,759
11	November 12	at Dallas Cowboys	**L** 6–23	2–8	Texas Stadium	62,170
12	November 19	at New England Patriots	**L** 13–16	2–9	Foxboro Stadium	60,292
13	November 26	**Pittsburgh Steelers**	**L** 28–48	2–10	Paul Brown Stadium	63,925
14	December 3	Arizona Cardinals	**W** 24–13	3–10	Paul Brown Stadium	50,289
15	December 10	at **Tennessee Titans**	**L** 3–35	3–11	Adelphia Coliseum	68,498
16	December 17	**Jacksonville Jaguars**	**W** 17–14	4–11	Paul Brown Stadium	50,469
17	December 24	at Philadelphia Eagles	**L** 7–16	4–12	Veterans Stadium	64,902

Note: Intra-division opponents are in bold text.

== Standings ==
AFC Central
	W	L	T	PCT	PF	PA	STK
^{(1)} Tennessee Titans	13	3	0	.813	346	191	W4
^{(4)} Baltimore Ravens	12	4	0	.750	333	165	W7
Pittsburgh Steelers	9	7	0	.563	321	255	W2
Jacksonville Jaguars	7	9	0	.438	367	327	L2
Cincinnati Bengals	4	12	0	.250	185	359	L1
Cleveland Browns	3	13	0	.188	161	419	L5

== Team leaders ==
=== Passing ===
Player	Att	Comp	Yds	TD	INT	Rating
Akili Smith	267	118	1253	3	6	52.8

=== Rushing ===
Player	Att	Yds	YPC	Long	TD
Corey Dillon	315	1435	4.6	80	7

=== Receiving ===
Player	Rec	Yds	Avg	Long	TD
Peter Warrick	51	592	11.6	46	4

=== Defensive ===
Player	Tackles	Sacks	INTs	FF	FR
Takeo Spikes	109	2.0	2	0	0
Tom Carter	43	0.0	2	0	0
Oliver Gibson	52	4.0	0	0	0
Steve Foley	43	4.0	1	2	1
Cory Hall	41	4.0	1	0	0

=== Kicking and punting ===
Player	FGA	FGM	FG%	XPA	XPM	XP%	Points
Neil Rackers	21	12	57.1%	21	21	100.0%	57

Player	Punts	Yards	Long	Blkd	Avg.
Daniel Pope	94	3775	57	0	40.2

=== Special teams ===
Player	KR	KRYards	KRAvg	KRLong	KRTD	PR	PRYards	PRAvg	PRLong	PRTD
Tremain Mack	50	1036	20.7	50	0	0	0	0.0	0	0
Craig Yeast	7	106	15.1	29	0	34	225	6.6	27	0

== Awards and records ==
- Corey Dillon, AFC Offensive Player of the Week (Week 8)
- Corey Dillon RB, AFC Pro Bowl selection
- Corey Dillon, Franchise Record, Most Rushing Yards in One Game (278 yards on October 22, 2000)
- Corey Dillon, Franchise Record, Most Rushing Yards in One Season (1,435 rushing yards)

=== Milestones ===
- Corey Dillon, 4th 1000 yard rushing season (1,435 rushing yards)
- Tremain Mack, 3rd 1000-yard return season (1,036 yards)

=== Best performances ===
- Corey Dillon, October 22, 2000, 278 rushing yards vs. the Denver Broncos
- Corey Dillon, December 3, 2000, 216 rushing yards vs. the Arizona Cardinals
