= Kelvin Moore (disambiguation) =

Kelvin Moore is a former Australian rules footballer in the Victorian Football League for Hawthorn.

Kelvin Moore may also refer to:

- Kelvin Moore (footballer, born 1984), former Australian rules footballer for Richmond
- Kelvin Moore (baseball) (1957–2014), Major League Baseball player
- Kelvin Moore (American football) (born 1975)
