= John Rickert =

American sports agent (born 1970)

John "JR" Rickert (born July 8, 1970) is an American sports agent who represents players in the National Football League, Major League Baseball, and the National Basketball Association, as well as boxers. He is the chief operating officer of Authentic Athletix Sports Agency's East Coast Offices, and is the owner of JR Sports Enterprises. Additionally, he is a former high school teacher and coach, and the former principal of Niskayuna High School.

== Recognition ==
- Empire State School Administrators' Association's "Administrator of the Year" in 2017
- Capital District YMCA's "Educator of the Year" in 2015
- Leukemia Lymphoma Society's "Man of the Year" in 2014
- The Capital District Business Review's "40 Under Forty" (2009).

Rickert represents more than 80 professional athletes including Joshua Cribbs, Adam "Pac Man" Jones, Dion Lewis, Mike Patterson, Hakeem Nicks, Lorenzo Alexander, Artis Hicks and Greg Camarillo. He also represents pitcher Angel Heredia of the Houston Astros organization, as well as 2 of youngest stars from the Dominican Republic, pitcher Juan Diaz, Jr. and infielder Raul Siri, both in the Pittsburgh Pirates organization. He also represents MLB 2018 draft pick Ray Hernandez. In boxing, he represents super middleweight boxer, J'Leon Love and undefeated light middleweight boxer Travell Mazion.

== Early years ==
Rickert was born in 1970 in Woodbury, New Jersey. John W. Rickert Jr. grew up in New Jersey and developed the nickname "JR" during his participation on various sports team in the 1980s. He graduated from Holy Cross High School in Delran Township, New Jersey in 1988. He went on to get a degrees in History and Communications at St. John Fisher College in Rochester, New York in 1992. In 1994, he received his master's degree in education from The College of Saint Rose in Albany, New York, as well as certificates of advanced studies in the fields of educational administration and business in 1999.

In 2000, Rickert signed his first NFL clients, and in 2002 Artis Hicks of the Philadelphia Eagles became Rickert's first client to make an NFL roster.

In 2001, Rickert became the 6th principal of Niskayuna High School.

In 2025, Rickert retired to run for Town Supervisor of Niskayuna, New York.

== Sports agencies ==
In 2003, Rickert formed National Sports Management (NSM) to handle the sports side of his representation business. To date, Rickert has negotiated a near $400 Million in player contracts. He has had at least one client drafted in 12 consecutive NFL drafts from 2003 - 2014. He also has had at least one client drafted in 9 consecutive MLB drafts from 2006 - 2014. Beginning in 2012, JR will operate all of his representation services under JR Sports Enterprises LLC and will only be associated with one firm, Peter Schaffer's Authentic Athletix. Rickert and Schaffer faced legal challenges from many of their former partners. Rickert was named in 3 separate lawsuits, all of which were settled by September 2012. Rickert and Schaffer have emerged stronger than ever from the legal challenges and were recently named Top 10 Agents in the NFL by "Inside the League." In 2013, Rickert branded his new "Team JR" representation team. Today, the team includes longtime Rickert associates Jared Fortier and Osiris Walcott. It also includes football division director, Jacoby Hudson, entertainment director, Jamell Romeo, client manager & boxing director, Cleveland "Fly As Day" Jones. Attorney Lou Lecce continues to serve as General Counsel of Team JR.

== Success in NFL-free agency ==
In 2010, Rickert successfully negotiated more NFL-free agent contracts than any other NFL agent, most notably that of Joshua Cribbs of the Cleveland Browns, which was made famous by Deion Sanders on NFL Network when he on air began to refer to Cribbs as "Pay The Man". He also negotiated contracts for Lorenzo Alexander, Artis Hicks, Rex Hadnot, and Matt Ware in the 2010 free agency period. In 2011, Rickert negotiated free agent contracts for Kevin Burnett with the Miami Dolphins and Josh Portis with the Seattle Seahawks. During the 2012 free agency period, he negotiated a 2-year deal for Jordan Babineaux with the Tennessee Titans and a 1-year for Artis Hicks with the Miami Dolphins. In 2013, clients Joshua Cribbs and Chris Ogbonnaya of the Cleveland Browns and Lorenzo Alexander of the Washington Redskins all became free agents. Alexander signed a 3-year deal with the Arizona Cardinals. Ogbonnaya signed a 2-year extension with the Browns. and Cribbs signed with the Oakland Raiders and later in the 2013 season with the New York Jets. In 2014, Mike Patterson signed with the New York Giants. In 2015, Rickert completed a 2-year extension for Dion Lewis with the New England Patriots. In 2016, longtime client Lorenzo Alexander also signed a 1-year deal with the Buffalo Bills with a 2-year extension in 2017 worth up to $9 Million. In 2018, Rickert negotiated a 4-year deal for Dion Lewis with the Tennessee Titans, worth up to $24 million.

== JR Enterprises Entertainment Group ==
In 2007, Rickert formed JR Enterprises Entertainment Group as an entertainment, media, and celebrity representation division. During that same year, Rickert co-created and launched Inside Pro Football, a radio show on WOFX (AM), Fox Sports 980. In September 2012, Rickert took Inside Pro Football to ESPN Radio's 104.5 The Team and the show moved to Saturday mornings at 9 AM.

JR's Entertainment Division's notable clients include former Heisman Trophy winner Tim Brown and The Real Housewives of Atlanta star Sheree Whitfield. Rickert has also advised several celebrities, including Derek Anderson (retired NBA player), Rachel Rickert (who performs as pop star Rae), Cynthia Bailey (Super model and Real Housewives of Atlanta star), Peter Thomas (Cynthia's husband and Real Housewives of Atlanta star), Tracy Lynn (Toronto TV's Channel 9), Kelly Slingerland (America's Miss New York) and Mayte Garcia (LA socialite and dance performer).

In December 2015, JR and his team partnered with Toney Productions to negotiate the Chris Brown concert to be held in Columbus, Georgia on February 13, 2016. Team JR's Jamell Romeo led the negotiations.

== Boxing ==
Rickert began representing boxers in 2001 with former NFL player and heavyweight Jevon Langford, who retired undefeated. In 2003, he became a consultant to former Welterweight Champion Tony Marshall. In 2008, Rickert represented the 7th rated female middleweight in the world, S'kati Katz, who also retired undefeated. In 2011, he signed undefeated middleweight, J'Leon Love of Detroit, Michigan. J'Leon was featured on HBO's Margarito/Cotto 24/7. Love is now a part of Floyd Mayweather's "Money Team" and trains regularly at the Mayweather Boxing Club in Las Vegas. Love has a record of 23-2 and is ranked in the top 25 super middleweights in the world according to BoxRec.

== Media presence ==
In 2011, Rickert joined Philadelphia Eagles blog Bleed-Green.com as the featured columnist of the "Inside Man: Diary Of An NFL Agent" series, which documented his life and dealings as a sports agent. He currently writes columns for www.SportsRants.com/jrrickert as an expert in the NFL, Major League Baseball, and boxing. He also writes blogs for www.technorati.com and orchestrated the "Year of the Fan" campaign which has been featured on Technorati. Rickert was a guest on ESPN's "Outside the Lines" in 2012 and was also featured in Tweetsicles.com and SportsRants.com for his work with social media and his athletes.

== Controversy ==
Rickert became the center of controversy after an attorney-turned author published Saving Babe Ruth in June 2014. While a work of fiction, the novel is loosely based on a true story. The novel includes a character named Jerry Conway who is a high school principal and a professional sports agent. While the character based on Rickert is minor component of the book, the author clearly attempted to use Rickert's name to create interest in the book. He also took several liberties in the creation of the character based on Rickert, including descriptions of interactions and meetings that were fabricated and sensationalized. Rickert has come under scrutiny for running a multimillion-dollar sports agency while working full-time as the principal of Niskayuna High School, a job where he earned a salary of $141,444 per year in 2014. In the end, under Rickert's leadership, Niskayuna High School is rated as the best high school in the area and among the best in the country (Newsweek 2014). There is no state law or district regulation that precludes him from pursuing both careers. On May 26, 2015, the Niskayuna Central School District announced that there was no conflict of interest for Rickert to serve as a sports agent.
