= Takeo Spikes =

American football player (born 1976)

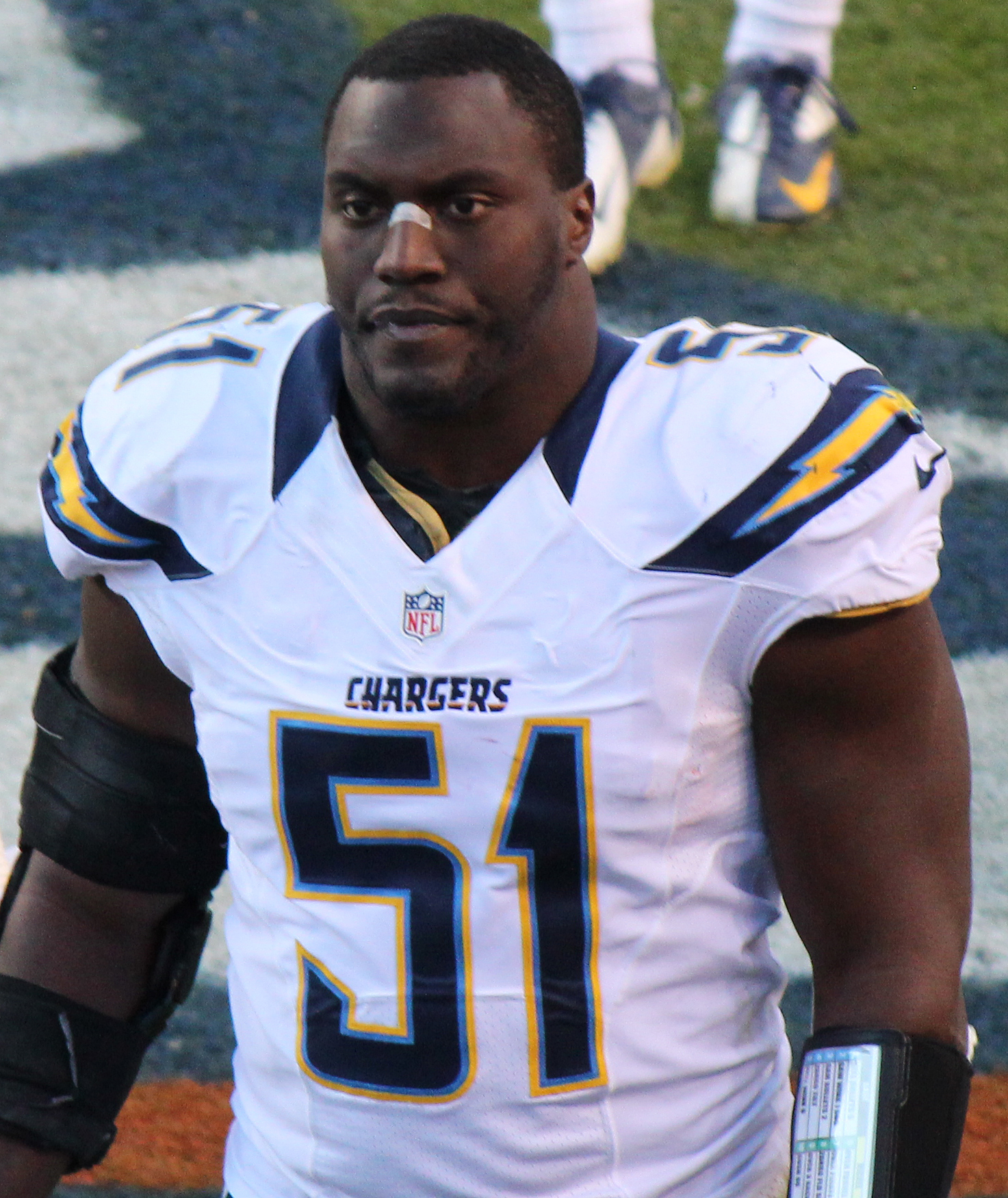
- Spikes with the San Diego Chargers in 2012

No. 51
- Position: Linebacker

Personal information
- Born: December 17, 1976 (age 49); Augusta, Georgia, U.S.
- Listed height: 6 ft 1 in (1.85 m)
- Listed weight: 242 lb (110 kg)

Career information
- High school: Washington County (Sandersville, Georgia)
- College: Auburn (1995–1997)
- NFL draft: 1998: 1st round, 13th overall pick

Career history
- Cincinnati Bengals (1998–2002); Buffalo Bills (2003–2006); Philadelphia Eagles (2007); San Francisco 49ers (2008–2010); San Diego Chargers (2011–2012)

Awards and highlights
- First-team All-Pro (2004); 2× Pro Bowl (2003, 2004); PFWA NFL All-Rookie Team (1998); Cincinnati Bengals 40th Anniversary Team; First-team All-American (1997); Second-team All-American (1996); 2× First-team All-SEC (1996, 1997)

Career NFL statistics
- Tackles: 1,431
- Sacks: 29
- Forced fumbles: 16
- Fumble recoveries: 18
- Interceptions: 19
- Defensive touchdowns: 4
- Stats at Pro Football Reference

Takeo Gerard Spikes (/təˈkiːoʊ/; born December 17, 1976) is an American former professional football player who was a linebacker in the National Football League (NFL). He played college football for Auburn Tigers. He was selected by the Cincinnati Bengals with the 13th overall pick in the 1998 NFL draft. A two-time Pro Bowl selection and one-time All-Pro, Spikes also played for the Buffalo Bills, Philadelphia Eagles, San Francisco 49ers, and San Diego Chargers.

Spikes is one of only seven linebackers to start more than 200 NFL games. Only once did Spikes record fewer than 70 tackles in a season. He was a team captain in 13 out of 15 seasons. Spikes played in 219 games without a playoff appearance, the most in NFL history. The Eagles, 49ers, and Chargers all made the playoffs the year after Spikes left each team.

After retiring from the NFL, Spikes became a media personality. He is a football analyst on NBC Sports Network and Sky Sports in the United Kingdom and co-hosts shows on SiriusXM and the SEC Network.

== Early life and education ==
Spikes was born in Augusta, Georgia. He attended Washington County High School in Sandersville, Georgia, where he earned All-American honors from Parade and USA Today and was named Georgia's "Mr. Football" by state coaches as a senior. Spikes was also named "Georgia Player of the Year" as a senior.

== College career ==
Takeo entered Auburn University, majoring in liberal arts. In the 1997 campaign, he led Auburn with 136 tackles as Auburn advanced to the SEC Championship game where they were defeated, 30–29, by the Tennessee Volunteers, led by Peyton Manning. Spikes was named MVP for his performance in this game. Spikes was college teammates with productive tailback Stephen Davis.

Takeo Spikes received his Auburn degree in 2016.

== Professional career ==
Pre-draft measurables
| Height | Weight | Arm length | Hand span | 20-yard shuttle | Three-cone drill | Vertical jump | Broad jump | Bench press |
|---|---|---|---|---|---|---|---|---|
| 6 ft 0 7/8 in (1.85 m) | 234 lb (106 kg) | 32 3/4 in (0.83 m) | 9 3/4 in (0.25 m) | 4.14 s | 7.84 s | 37.0 in (0.94 m) | 10 ft 4 in (3.15 m) | 27 reps |
All values from NFL Combine

=== Cincinnati Bengals ===
Spikes entered the 1998 NFL draft and was selected in the first round by the Cincinnati Bengals. In his rookie season he started all preseason games and all regular season games. He became the first rookie to lead the Bengals in tackles since James Francis led them in 1990. He also led the team by total snaps played on offense and defense, which added up to 997.

In 1999, he was the team captain, playing in all his games as a right inside linebacker and a right linebacker. He forced four fumbles and recovered four, leading the team in fumble recoveries as well.

In 2000, he played every game as a right linebacker and recorded 128 tackles. He passed the 100 tackle mark for the third straight time and led the team in tackles and fumble recoveries.

In 2001, Spikes started at RLB for all of the 15 games he played that season. He once again led the team in solo and total tackles in the 2001 campaign. Spikes missed Game 5 because of his father's death. Spikes dedicated the season, and the remainder of his professional career to his father. He wrote his dad's name on the tape he wrapped around his wrists for the remaining 12 games of the season.

The 2002 season was his final season with the Bengals, as he played all 16 games. In his tenure with the Bengals, he played 79 of a possible 80 games, missing only one for his father's funeral. He led the team in solo and total tackles once again and scored his second defensive TD by way of fumble recovery. Following the season, Spikes was given the designated player tag making him a restricted free agent. After not finishing better than 6–10 during any of his seasons in Cincinnati, Spikes stated he rather sign with a playoff contender. (However, the Bills did not make the playoffs for the entire 2000s decade, while the Bengals went 11–5 and won their division in 2005).

=== Buffalo Bills ===
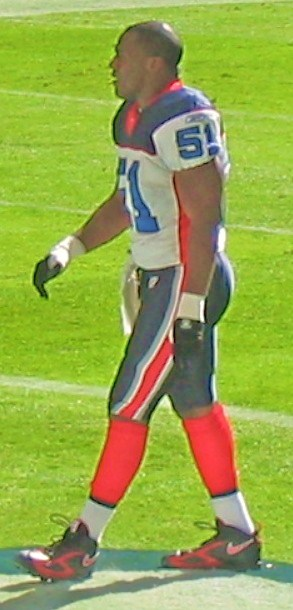
Spikes with the Buffalo Bills in 2006

The Buffalo Bills signed Spikes to an offersheet worth $32 million over six years, that the Bengals did not match. The 2003 season earned Spikes his first Pro Bowl selection. He recorded 126 tackles, with the addition of a pair of sacks, a pair of interceptions, and a pair of fumble recoveries.

On September 25, 2005, Spikes suffered a season-ending tear to his right Achilles' tendon while tackling Michael Vick during the Bills' 24–16 loss to the Atlanta Falcons in Week 3. In 2006, while recovering from a torn Achilles tendon, Spikes played in 12 games while missing 4 games early in the season due to a hamstring injury. During the first series of the first game of the year, Spikes made a blind side sack on Patriots QB Tom Brady, forcing a fumble which was recovered by Bills LB London Fletcher for a touchdown. The sack and forced fumble were Spikes' only of the season.

=== Philadelphia Eagles ===
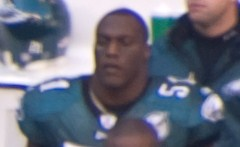
Spikes with the Philadelphia Eagles in 2007

On March 26, 2007, he was traded alongside Kelly Holcomb to the Philadelphia Eagles, in exchange for Darwin Walker and a 2008 NFL draft selection. After an effective first season as an Eagle, Spikes' season was cut short in week 14 when he suffered a torn rotator cuff injury against the Dallas Cowboys, a game the Eagles won, 10–6.

With emerging linebackers Stewart Bradley and Omar Gaither ready to take over, the Eagles chose not to pick up his team option, thus making him a free agent. The Eagles had made the playoffs six of the previous seven years before he was traded there, and also the following three after he left (including a trip to the NFC Championship game the next year). However, by not making the playoffs in his lone season in Philadelphia, Spikes went eight seasons without being part of a playoff team.

=== San Francisco 49ers ===
On August 10, 2008, Spikes was signed by the San Francisco 49ers on the same day they released linebacker Brandon Moore. Spikes was assigned No. 51, with Dontarrious Thomas changing from 51 to 56 – the number previously worn by Moore. On February 27, 2009, Takeo was re-signed to a 2-year contract. Spikes was team captain in San Francisco all 3 years of play.

Spikes recorded 1 sack and 3 interceptions in the 2008 season. In 2009, Spikes recorded 4 sacks and missed one game due to an injury on November 1, 2009. In San Francisco, Spikes became famous for his sack dance. In 2010, Spikes led all linebackers in most attempted tackles per miss. Spikes missed four tackles over his three seasons with San Francisco.

Called Bamm Bamm and TKO, Patrick Willis and Takeo Spikes were called the dynamic duo. Spikes said, "With Patrick I’ve always admired how great he wants to be at a young age. That’s how he gained my respect. He would always just hound me and ask me questions. He was the sponge and I was the bucket of water...that’s why our relationship is bigger than just on the field. He’s like a brother to me."

After being assured that he would be re-signed by head coach Mike Singletary, the 49ers fired Singletary and decided to go with rookie NaVorro Bowman as the starter, making Spikes a free agent once again.

=== San Diego Chargers ===
Spikes signed a three-year contract with the San Diego Chargers on July 26, 2011. Spikes was team captain both seasons with San Diego.

On September 11, 2012, Spikes played his 200th career start earning him membership in a very elite group of linebackers to reach this achievement. On September 30, 2012, he forced Jamaal Charles to fumble when playing against the Kansas City Chiefs. The Chargers later won the game, 37–20. Spikes was released by the Chargers on March 7, 2013.

== NFL career statistics ==
Legend
| **Bold** | Career high |

| Year | Team | GP | Tackles | | | | Fumbles | | | Interceptions | | | | | |
| Year | Team | GP | Comb | Solo | Ast | Sack | FF | FR | Yds | Int | Yds | Avg | Lng | TD | PD |
|---|---|---|---|---|---|---|---|---|---|---|---|---|---|---|---|
| 1998 | CIN | 16 | 112 | 95 | 17 | 2.0 | 0 | 0 | 0 | 0 | 0 | 0.0 | 0 | 0 | 2 |
| 1999 | CIN | 16 | 103 | 80 | 23 | 3.0 | **4** | **4** | 0 | 2 | 7 | 3.5 | 7 | 0 | 6 |
| 2000 | CIN | 16 | **128** | **109** | 19 | 2.0 | 0 | 3 | 0 | 2 | 12 | 6.0 | 7 | 0 | 4 |
| 2001 | CIN | 15 | 109 | 80 | 29 | **6.0** | 1 | 0 | 0 | 1 | 66 | **66.0** | **66** | 1 | 5 |
| 2002 | CIN | 16 | 112 | 80 | 32 | 1.5 | 1 | **4** | 0 | 0 | 0 | 0.0 | 0 | 0 | 1 |
| 2003 | BUF | 16 | 126 | 70 | **56** | 2.0 | 1 | 2 | 0 | 2 | 1 | 0.5 | 1 | 0 | 8 |
| 2004 | BUF | 16 | 96 | 61 | 35 | 3.0 | 3 | 1 | 0 | **5** | **122** | 24.4 | 62 | **2** | **16** |
| 2005 | BUF | 3 | 17 | 11 | 6 | 1.0 | 1 | 0 | 0 | 0 | 0 | 0.0 | 0 | 0 | 0 |
| 2006 | BUF | 12 | 70 | 43 | 27 | 1.0 | 1 | 0 | 0 | 0 | 0 | 0.0 | 0 | 0 | 3 |
| 2007 | PHI | 14 | 86 | 64 | 22 | 1.0 | 0 | 0 | 0 | 0 | 0 | 0.0 | 0 | 0 | 4 |
| 2008 | SF | 16 | 96 | 61 | 35 | 1.0 | 2 | 1 | 0 | 3 | 14 | 4.7 | 13 | 0 | 6 |
| 2009 | SF | 15 | 75 | 57 | 18 | 4.0 | 0 | 1 | 0 | 0 | 0 | 0.0 | 0 | 0 | 1 |
| 2010 | SF | 16 | 109 | 82 | 27 | 0.0 | 0 | 1 | **8** | 3 | 9 | 3.0 | 6 | 0 | 9 |
| 2011 | SD | 16 | 106 | 64 | 42 | 1.0 | 0 | 0 | 0 | 1 | 45 | 45.0 | 45 | 0 | 3 |
| 2012 | SD | 16 | 78 | 53 | 25 | 0.5 | 1 | 0 | 0 | 0 | 0 | 0.0 | 0 | 0 | 1 |
| Career | | 219 | 1,423 | 1,010 | 413 | 29.0 | 15 | 17 | 8 | 19 | 276 | 14.5 | 66 | 3 | 69 |

== Personal life ==
Spikes was named after Japan's 66th Prime Minister Takeo Miki after Spikes' parents saw a news report about the Japanese prime minister. Miki's successor, who was appointed the nation's 67th Prime Minister on December 24, 1976, a week after Takeo was born, was also a Takeo (Fukuda). Takeo's younger cousin Brandon Spikes is a former linebacker who played for the New England Patriots and the Buffalo Bills.

Spikes dedicated his entire career to his father shortly after he died. Spikes said, "My father was a good man. Really showed me the work ethic ... taught me to feel like you're not entitled to anything. If I can live my life just as he did, even three-quarters of the way he did, then I figure I'll have a pretty successful life."

Spikes and singer Tionne Watkins dated from 2006 to 2009.

Takeo Spikes received his Auburn degree in 2016. In 2016, Spikes earned a Master of Business Administration degree from the University of Miami Business School.

=== Neck and strength ===
Spikes is recognized and known for the size and strength of his neck. Bleacher Report called Spikes "the most jacked linebacker in the NFL." Spikes has measured his neck at 21 inches. At one point in his career, he could bench 490 pounds. He was featured in ESPN The Magazine's "The Body Issue" in 2012 with a focus on his neck and trapezius.

== Philanthropy ==
Spikes provides mentoring at his annual TKO camp where he inspires young boys and girls to reach their goals. The mission of the camp is to help the participants bridge the gap of taking their goals from dreams to reality. The day-long event gives middle to high school age girls and boys an opportunity to participate in a basketball camp, football camp, and cheerleading camp with motivational speeches and Q&A with professional athletes. The annual event also includes a financial contribution to the local Washington County, GA athletic department.
