= Corey Dillon =

American football player (born 1974)

No. 28
- Position: Running back

Personal information
- Born: October 24, 1974 (age 52); Seattle, Washington, U.S.
- Listed height: 6 ft 1 in (1.85 m)
- Listed weight: 225 lb (102 kg)

Career information
- High school: Franklin (Seattle)
- College: Garden City (1994); Dixie State (1995); Washington (1996)
- NFL draft: 1997: 2nd round, 43rd overall pick

Career history
- Cincinnati Bengals (1997–2003); New England Patriots (2004–2006)

Awards and highlights
- Super Bowl champion (XXXIX); 4× Pro Bowl (1999–2001, 2004); PFWA NFL All-Rookie Team (1997); Cincinnati Bengals Ring of Honor; Cincinnati Bengals 50th Anniversary Team; New England Patriots All-2000s Team; New England Patriots All-Dynasty Team; Third-team All-American (1996); NCAA rushing touchdowns leader (1996); NCAA scoring leader (1996); First-team All-Pac-10 (1996)

Career NFL statistics
- Rushing yards: 11,241
- Rushing average: 4.3
- Rushing touchdowns: 82
- Receptions: 244
- Receiving yards: 1,913
- Receiving touchdowns: 7
- Stats at Pro Football Reference

Corey James Dillon (born October 24, 1974) is an American former professional football running back who played in the National Football League (NFL) for 10 seasons with the Cincinnati Bengals and New England Patriots. He played college football for the Washington Huskies, earning third-team All-American and first-team All-Pac-10 honors in 1996. Dillon was selected by the Bengals in the second round of the 1997 NFL draft.

During his seven years with the Bengals, Dillon set several franchise records and earned three consecutive Pro Bowl selections. He played for the Patriots in his last three seasons, where he was named to his fourth Pro Bowl and won Super Bowl XXXIX. Dillon retired with more than 11,000 rushing yards and is 21st in NFL career rushing yards. For his accomplishments in Cincinnati, he was inducted to the Bengals Ring of Honor in 2024.

== Early life ==
Born and raised in Seattle, Washington, Dillon attended Franklin High School, where he teamed with his cousin, Ed Raiford, to form one of the state's all-time twosomes for the Quakers football team. Dillon and Raiford garnered Parade, USA, Best In The West and Tom Flemming All-American awards. Both were two-sport standouts, Raiford also starred as an All-State basketball player while Dillon starred in baseball. An excellent baseball catcher, Dillon garnered All-Metro honors, and was selected by the San Diego Padres in the 1993 Major League Baseball draft.

== College career ==
Dillon played junior college football as a freshman at Garden City Community College in Garden City, Kansas, rushing for 1,165 yards and 16 touchdowns in 1994. The following year, he played at Dixie State College—now known as Utah Tech University—in St. George, Utah, rushing for 1,899 yards and 20 touchdowns in 279 attempts. Dillon was chosen JC Offensive Back of the Year by College Sports magazine.

At the University of Washington in Seattle, Dillon played one season of college football with the Huskies in 1996. Known for using a very aggressive and punishing style of running, Dillon set the team all-time single-season records for rushing yards (1,695 yards) and touchdowns scored (24). That season, he led the nation with 22 rushing touchdowns and in scoring with 138 points. In the first quarter against San Jose State in mid-November, Dillon rushed for 222 yards and caught an 83-yard touchdown pass, setting NCAA records for both rushing yards and all-purpose yards (305) in one quarter. Dillon did not re-enter the game as the Huskies were comfortably ahead 25–0 by the end of the first quarter on a cold and rainy afternoon. The Dawgs led 43–3 at the half and won 53–10.

In the 1996 Holiday Bowl against Colorado, Dillon rushed for 140 yards and added two more touchdowns to his regular-season total of 23. He scored five TDs in a 41–21 victory over UCLA, earning Sports Illustrated National Player of the Week honors as he rushed for 145 yards and added 53 yards in receptions.

== Professional career ==
Pre-draft measurables
Height	Weight	Arm length	Hand span
6 ft 0 5/8 in (1.84 m)	217 lb (98 kg)	34 in (0.86 m)	10 1/4 in (0.26 m)
All values from NFL Combine

=== Cincinnati Bengals ===
The Cincinnati Bengals selected Dillon in the second round of the 1997 NFL draft, the 43rd overall pick. During his first season in 1997, Dillon rushed 39 times for 246 yards and 4 touchdowns in a 41–14 win over the Tennessee Oilers, breaking Jim Brown's rookie single-game record that had stood for 40 years. That game remains a Bengals rookie record for carries, yards, and touchdowns, and franchise record for touchdowns. His 1,129 yards that season is also still a Bengals rookie record. For six seasons, Dillon was one of the few bright spots on otherwise struggling Bengals teams. Dillon voiced his frustrations with the team and owner Mike Brown, stating "we will never win with the Brown family in Cincinnati," after a 2001 game. From 1997 to 2002, he rushed for over 1,000 yards each year, and made the Pro Bowl 3 times from 1999 to 2001. On October 22, 2000, Dillon set an NFL record for most yards rushed in one game (278 yards) against the Denver Broncos, breaking Walter Payton's single-game mark of 275 yards set in 1977. (Note: Almost a year earlier, one month after Payton's death, coach Bruce Coslet took Dillon out of a 44–28 victory over the Cleveland Browns in the third quarter, at a point in the game in which he seemed to be on pace to break Payton's record long before game's end. Coslet explained to reporters afterward that Payton had set that record in a 10–7 win.) That record has since been broken by Jamal Lewis (295 yards) on September 14, 2003, and Adrian Peterson (296 yards) on November 4, 2007. Dillon's mark remains a franchise record for yards and yards-per-carry (12.64).

In 2003, Dillon rushed 138 times for 541 yards and two touchdowns due to injury.

=== New England Patriots ===
In 2004, Dillon was traded to the New England Patriots for a second-round pick, which the Bengals later used to draft Madieu Williams.

In the 2004 season, Dillon set career highs and franchise records with 1,635 rushing yards and 12 touchdowns. He was a major factor in the Patriots' win over the Indianapolis Colts in New England's first playoff game that season, rushing for 144 yards and catching 5 passes for 17 yards. New England won its third Super Bowl, due in no small part to the running game built around Dillon. He was the top rusher of Super Bowl XXXIX with 75 rushing yards and a touchdown, while also catching 3 passes for 31 yards, for 106 total yards. Overall, Dillon rushed for a total of 292 yards, caught 9 passes for 53 yards, and scored 2 touchdowns in New England's 3 postseason games.

In 2005, while injury problems plagued Dillon and he was not able to duplicate his stats from 2004, he remained a major contributor to the team, rushing for 733 yards and 12 touchdowns in 12 games. The Patriots used Dillon more frequently as a pass receiver, with 23 receptions for 193 yards and a touchdown, which was more receiving yards than he had gained in his past 2 seasons combined.

In the 2006 season, Dillon began sharing the team's rushing duties with rookie running back Laurence Maroney. With the retirement of Curtis Martin, he spent his final year as the NFL's active leader in career rushing yards. He finished the year with 812 rushing yards and a career-high 13 touchdowns, tied him for third in the league that season.

=== Retirement ===
The Patriots released Dillon on March 2, 2007. Dillon subsequently told the Boston Globe in August that he would retire from the NFL. A month later, Dillon admitted to considering a comeback with the Patriots with the season-ending injury to RB Sammy Morris, but ultimately remained retired.

== NFL career statistics ==
Legend
	Won the Super Bowl
**Bold**	Career high

=== Regular season ===
Year	Team	GP	Rushing					Receiving					Fumbles	
Year	Team	GP	Att	Yds	Avg	Lng	TD	Rec	Yds	Avg	Lng	TD	Fum	Lost
1997	CIN	16	233	1,129	**4.8**	71	10	27	256	9.6	28	0	1	0
1998	CIN	15	262	1,130	4.3	66	4	28	178	6.4	41	1	2	2
1999	CIN	15	263	1,200	4.6	50	5	31	290	9.4	23	1	3	2
2000	CIN	16	315	1,435	4.6	80	7	18	158	8.8	31	0	4	3
2001	CIN	16	340	1,315	3.9	**96**	10	34	228	6.7	17	**3**	5	3
2002	CIN	16	314	1,311	4.2	67	7	**43**	**298**	6.9	19	0	5	2
2003	CIN	13	138	541	3.9	39	2	11	71	6.5	14	0	0	0
2004	NE	15	**345**	**1,635**	4.7	44	12	15	103	6.9	20	1	4	3
2005	NE	12	209	733	3.5	29	12	22	181	8.2	25	1	1	1
2006	NE	16	199	812	4.1	50	**13**	15	147	**9.8**	**52**	0	2	2
Career		150	2,618	11,241	4.3	96	82	244	1,913	7.8	52	7	27	18

=== Bengals franchise records ===
- Most rushing yards in a career – 8,061
- Most carries in a career – 1,865
- Most rushing yards per game in a career – 75.3
- Most rushing yards in a game – 278 (2000)
- Most rushing touchdowns in a game – 4 (1997): tied with Joe Mixon

=== Patriots franchise records ===
- Most rushing yards in a single regular season – 1,635 (2004)
- Most rushing yards in the postseason in a career – 508
- Most carries in the postseason in a career – 120

== Personal life ==
Dillon has three daughters with his ex-wife, who filed for divorce in April 2010.

== See also ==
- List of NCAA major college football yearly scoring leaders
- Washington Huskies football statistical leaders
