= Scott Semptimphelter =

American football player and coach (born 1972)

No. 9
- Position: Quarterback

Personal information
- Born: May 15, 1972 (age 54); Florence Township, New Jersey, U.S.
- Listed height: 6 ft 2 in (1.88 m)
- Listed weight: 215 lb (98 kg)

Career information
- High school: Holy Cross (Delran Township, New Jersey)
- College: Lehigh
- NFL draft: 1994: undrafted

Career history

Playing
- Dallas Cowboys (1995–1996)*; Orlando Predators (1997); Nashville Kats (1998–1999); Los Angeles Avengers (1999–2000); Detroit Fury (2001); New York Dragons (2002); Detroit Fury (2002)
- * Offseason or practice squad member only

Coaching
- Holy Cross Lancers (1994–1997) (OC); Brentwood Bruins (2003–2004); Nashville Kats (2005) (QB)

Career AFL statistics
- Pass Att–Com: 1,146–661
- Percentage: 57.7
- TD–INT: 167–44
- Passing yards: 8,392
- Passer rating: 101.09
- Stats at ArenaFan.com

Scott Semptimphelter (born May 15, 1972) is an American former professional football quarterback who played five seasons in the Arena Football League (AFL) with the Orlando Predators, Nashville Kats, Los Angeles Avengers, Detroit Fury, and New York Dragons. He played college football at Lehigh University. He also attended training camp twice with the Dallas Cowboys of the National Football League (NFL).

== Early life and college ==
Semptimphelter attended Holy Cross High School in Delran Township, New Jersey.

He was a two-year starter at Lehigh University. He threw for 3,349 yards and 30 touchdowns as a senior in 1993. He passed for 6,468 yards and 51 touchdowns in his career.

== Professional career ==
Semptimphelter spent time with the Dallas Cowboys' training camp roster in 1995 and 1996. He threw for 1,859 yards, 36 touchdowns and six interceptions in 1997 for the Orlando Predators of the AFL. The Predators lost in the second round of the playoffs to the Iowa Barnstormers. He was traded to the Nashville Kats in April 1998 for the rights to John Dewitt II. Semptimphelter served as the backup to Andy Kelly. Scott was traded to the Los Angeles Avengers in December 1999 for a third round draft pick. He threw for 1,551 yards, 28 touchdowns and seven interceptions in 2000. He was the first starting quarterback in franchise history. Semptimphelter was signed by the AFL's Detroit Fury on January 2, 2001. He accumulated 3,508 passing yards, 76 touchdowns and 20 interceptions in 2001. The Fury lost in the first round of the playoffs to the Arizona Rattlers. He was signed by the New York Dragons of the AFL on April 25, 2002. Semptimphelter was traded to the Detroit Fury on June 3, 2002.

== Coaching career ==
Semptimphelter was offensive coordinator of Holy Cross High School in Delran Township, New Jersey from 1994 to 1997. He was offensive coordinator of Brentwood High School in Brentwood, Tennessee from 2003 to 2004. He was quarterbacks coach for the Nashville Kats in 2005.

== Personal life ==
Semptimphelter met his wife, Traci, in 1997 at a postgame gathering after a game between the Orlando Predators and Nashville Kats. At the time, Semptimphelter was a player for the Predators and Traci was a cheerleader for the Kats.
