= Holy Cross Preparatory Academy =

Catholic high school in Burlington County, New Jersey, US

Location
- 5035 Route 130 South; Delran Township, Burlington County, New Jersey 08075; United States
- 40°01′12″N 74°57′11″W

Information
- Former names: Holy Cross High School; Holy Cross Academy
- Type: Private, parochial
- Motto: "Honoring our Traditions, Pursuing our Future"
- Religious affiliation: Roman Catholic
- Established: 1957
- NCES School ID: 00867265
- President: Alex Pracher
- Principal: David Moffa
- Faculty: 19.8 FTEs
- Grades: 9–12
- Gender: Coeducational
- Enrollment: 300 (as of 2023–24)
- Student to teacher ratio: 15.2:1
- Campus size: 94 acres (0.38 km^{2})
- Colors: Maroon; White
- Athletics: Football, Girls Soccer, Boys Soccer, Field Hockey, Girls Tennis, Cross Country, Girls Volleyball, Fall Cheerleading, Boys Basketball, Girls Basketball, Wrestling, Swimming, Winter Track, Dance Team, Winter Cheerleading, Baseball, Softball, Girls Lacrosse, Boys Lacrosse, Spring Track & Field, Golf
- Athletics conference: Burlington County Scholastic League (general); West Jersey Football League (football)
- Mascot: Lancer z
- Team name: Lancers
- Accreditation: AdvancED
- Publication: Tumbler (literary magazine)
- Newspaper: Crossroads
- Yearbook: The Lance
- Tuition: $11,700 (2024–25)
- Website: hcprep.org

Holy Cross Preparatory Academy is a four-year Catholic high school serving students in ninth through twelfth grades, located in Delran Township in Burlington County, in the U.S. state of New Jersey. The school is the only Roman Catholic high school in the county. Holy Cross has been accredited by AdvancED since 2013. The school was run under the supervision of the Roman Catholic Diocese of Trenton until 2018 when the school became independent.

Occupying a 78-acre (0.32 km^{2}) campus, it has a variety of co-curricular activities, including about 40 sports teams in 23 athletic programs and 50 clubs, for students to participate in. Tuition for the 2022–23 school year was $10,900.

As of the 2023–24 school year, the school had an enrollment of 300 students and 19.8 classroom teachers (on an FTE basis), for a student–teacher ratio of 15.2:1. The school's student body was 72.3% (217) White, 17.7% (53) Black, 6.3% (19) Hispanic and 3.7% (11) Asian. The student population is from a range of socioeconomic backgrounds. 99% of the school's graduates go onto two and four-year colleges and universities.

== History ==
Constructed on a 100-acre (40 ha) site at a cost of $3 million (equivalent to $34.4 million in 2025), the school opened to an initial group of 400 students in September 1957 as the county's first Catholic high school.

The school underwent a $3.5 million renovation in 2005. A renovated Gerald Finsen Media Center was built during the 2005–06 school year.

Former principal Joseph Lemme pleaded guilty in December 2007 to the theft of $400,000 from the school for his personal use and was sentenced to five years in prison as part of a plea bargain.

In October 2017 the Diocese of Trenton informed the Holy Cross administration that the school's future was in jeopardy due to the schools enrollment and financial status. Throughout the final months of 2017 the alumni organized a Founding Board to determine if they could find a way to avoid the school’s closure and questioned the Diocese about becoming an independent school. In December 2017 Bishop David M. O'Connell met with school administration and informed them that the school would be closed at the conclusion of the 2017-18 school year. He then met with the Founding Board and informed them of the religious requirements for the school to become independent. The Diocese finally gave the board the permission to move forward and work to become an independent Catholic high school. Prior to 2018 the diocese spent about $500,000 each year to cover the deficit to keep the school in operation; the school remained open since the alumni were able to raise that much in donations. The school's name was changed to Holy Cross Preparatory Academy that year.

== Extracurricular activities ==
Holy Cross' student government format is a Student Council.

== Athletics ==
The Holy Cross Lancers compete in the Burlington County Scholastic League (BCSL), which is comprised of public and private high schools in Burlington, Mercer and Ocean counties in Central Jersey, and operates under the supervision of the New Jersey State Interscholastic Athletic Association (NJSIAA). With 221 students in grades 10-12, the school was classified by the NJSIAA for the 2019–20 school year as Non-Public B for most athletic competition purposes, which included schools with an enrollment of 37 to 366 students in that grade range (equivalent to Group 1 for public schools). The football team competes in the Classic Division of the 94-team West Jersey Football League superconference and was classified by the NJSIAA as Non-Public Group B (equivalent to Group I/II for public schools) for football for 2024–2026, which included schools with 140 to 686 students.

The football team won the Non-Public A state championship in 1977, 1982, 1991 and 1992; won the Non-Public Group IV state sectional title in 2000 and won the Non-Public Group II championship in 2007 and 2008. The team won the Parochial A South title in 1977 after a 14-6 win against Red Bank Catholic High School in the tournament final. The 2000 team finished the season with a 10-2 record after coming back from a 41-20 deficit in the third quarter to win the Non-Public Group IV championship game by a score of 41-40 over Don Bosco Preparatory High School on a field goal kicked as time expired. In 2007, the team won the Non-Public Group II state championship with a 17–0 win over Gloucester Catholic High School in the tournament final. In 2008, the team repeated as Non-Public Group II state champion with a 7–0 win over Hudson Catholic High School.

The softball team won the Non-Public A state championship in 1985 and 1989, defeating Paramus Catholic High School in the final game of the tournament in both seasons. The 1989 team finished the season with a record of 14-8 after winning the Non-Public A state championship, defeating Paramus Catholic by a score of 3-0 in the tournament championship game played at Trenton State College.

The boys' soccer team won the Non-Public A state championship in 1989, as co-champion with Delbarton School. The 2007 boys soccer team won the South B state sectional championship with a 1–0 win over Bishop Eustace Preparatory School in the tournament final.

The girls spring track team won the Non-Public A state championship in 1991 and the Non-Public B title in 2008. In 2008, the team won the Patriot Division championship, the South Jersey Non-Public B championship, and the Non-Public B state championship for their first state title since 1991.

The girls' soccer team won the Group IV state championship in 1993 (against runner-up Randolph High School in the tournament final) and in Group III in 1995 (vs. Ramapo High School). The 1993 team defeated Randolph by a score of 2-0 in the championship game to win the Group IV title at Trenton State College.

The boys' wrestling team won the Non-Public A state sectional championship in 1993, and won the Non-Public B title in 2005 and 2015.

The girls tennis team won the Non-Public A state championship in 1994, defeating runner-up Academy of the Holy Angels by a score of 3-2 in the final match of the tournament at Mercer County Park.

The field hockey team won the Central Jersey Group I state sectional championship in 2007 and 2009. In 2007, the field hockey team won the sectional title with a 2–1 win over Haddonfield Memorial High School in the tournament final.

During the 2007-08 sports season, Holy Cross sports teams won a total of six state championships. The school was awarded the ShopRite Cup for Group B in 2007-08 in recognition of first place finishes in football, both boys and girls spring track and both boys and girls winter track individuals; second place in field hockey, boys soccer; third place in boys golf and girls soccer (tied), plus bonus points for having no disqualifications in any season.

A team representing Holy Cross High School competes in the South Jersey High School Ice Hockey League. In 2007, the Lancers Ice Hockey team won the S.J.H.S.H.L. Championship defeating Cherry Hill High School West, the school's first ice hockey championship since 1993.

In 2008, the boys' spring / outdoor track team won the Patriot Division championship, the South Jersey Non-Public B championship, and the Non-Public B state championship for the first time in program history.

The baseball team won the Non-Public B state championship in 2016, defeating runner-up St. Mary High School in the finals and finishing the season with a record of 25-7-1.

== Administration ==
Core members of the school's administration include:

- Alex Pracher, President
- David Moffa, Principal
- Alice Penza, Dean of Students

== Notable alumni ==
- Mark Adamo (born 1962), composer and librettist with New York City Opera
- Lance Bangs (born 1972, class of 1990), filmmaker, known for the Jackass movies as well as The Lazarus Effect
- Avon Cobourne (born 1979), CFL player for the Montreal Alouettes
- Phil Costa (born 1987), NFL player for the Dallas Cowboys
- Brad Costello (born 1974), former American football punter who played for the Cincinnati Bengals of the NFL and the Scottish Claymores of NFL Europe
- Keith Garagozzo (born 1969), former MLB pitcher who played for the Minnesota Twins
- Anthony Giacchino (born 1969), filmmaker and producer
- Michael Giacchino (born 1967), composer and Academy Award winner for Up
- Kevin Hickman (born 1971), former football tight end who played in the NFL for the Detroit Lions from 1995 to 1998
- Joe Hudson (born 1970), former MLB pitcher who played for the Boston Red Sox and the Milwaukee Brewers
- Stephen Kasprzyk (born 1982, class of 2000), rower who competed in the Men's eight event at the 2012 Summer Olympics
- Michelle Kosinski (born 1974), NBC News Emmy-award-winning foreign correspondent, based in London
- Dennis Landolt (born 1986), football player for the New York Jets
- Kevin Landolt (born 1975), defensive tackle who played in the NFL for the Jacksonville Jaguars
- Todd Lehmann, basketball player
- Wali Lundy (born 1983), running back for the Houston Texans
- Gregg Murphy (born 1971), sportscaster on Comcast SportsNet Philadelphia who has been a broadcaster for the Philadelphia Phillies
- Jerry Penacoli (born 1956), correspondent on Extra
- Ryan Peters (born c. 1982), politician who has represented the 8th Legislative District in the New Jersey General Assembly since 2018
- Gervase Peterson (born 1969), contestant on Survivor: Borneo
- John Rickert (born 1970), sports agent for NFL, MLB, and NBA players
- Keith Saunders (born 1984), linebacker who has played for the Winnipeg Blue Bombers
- Scott Semptimphelter (born 1972), Arena Football League player
- Mark Zagunis (born 1993; class of 2011), professional baseball player
- Jeff Zaun (born 1971), former professional soccer player who played at Holy Cross for three seasons before transferring out for his senior year

== Notable faculty ==
- Greg Luzinski (born 1950), former MLB left fielder for the Philadelphia Phillies and Chicago White Sox, who coached baseball and football at Holy Cross from 1985 to 1992
