= Steve Foley (linebacker) =

American football player (born 1975)

No. 95, 58, 53
- Position: Linebacker

Personal information
- Born: September 11, 1975 (age 51); Little Rock, Arkansas, U.S.
- Listed height: 6 ft 4 in (1.93 m)
- Listed weight: 265 lb (120 kg)

Career information
- High school: Hall (Little Rock)
- College: UL Monroe
- NFL draft: 1998: 3rd round, 75th overall pick

Career history
- Cincinnati Bengals (1998–2002); Houston Texans (2003); San Diego Chargers (2004–2006)

Career NFL statistics
- Total tackles: 271
- Sacks: 25
- Forced fumbles: 11
- Fumble recoveries: 5
- Interceptions: 3
- Stats at Pro Football Reference

Steve Foley (born September 11, 1975) is an American former professional football player who was a linebacker in the National Football League (NFL). He was selected in the third round of the 1998 NFL draft.

== Early life ==
Foley attended Hall High School in Little Rock, Arkansas. In football, he was an All-Conference selection, All-State selection, and an All-American selection at both tight end and linebacker.

== Shooting incident ==
On September 3, 2006, Foley was shot outside his house by off-duty police officer Aaron Mansker after Mansker observed Foley driving erratically at speeds ranging from 30 mph to 90 mph on a San Diego freeway. Mansker, wearing civilian clothes, followed Foley onto a local side street and identified himself as a police officer (but later testified he did not show him his badge) to no avail with Foley, who got out of the car to confront Mansker, then returned to his vehicle and continued driving. When Foley reached his home street, he again exited his car and advanced on Mansker. Foley's passenger, Lisa Gaut, got into the driver's side and began to rev the vehicle. Gaut then drove the vehicle around Foley and toward Mansker, who fired two shots into the vehicle's hood in what he claims was self-defense. Foley continued to advance and Mansker fired a warning shot into the dirt, later testifying that he did so because earlier in the confrontation Foley had stated that he did not believe the gun was real. Mansker then saw Foley reach into his waistband and reacted by shooting Foley in the knee. Foley still continued to advance, causing Mansker to fire three more times. Foley was taken to a local hospital where the wounds were found to be non-life-threatening. He was placed on the non-football injury list the following day and did not play during the 2006 NFL season, forfeiting his $775,000 salary for the season. The incident occurred a week after Foley was cleared of multiple charges that included resisting arrest and battery of an officer. Foley was under the influence of alcohol as he was spotted staggering out of the San Diego nightclub Stingaree about half an hour before the officer spotted him and was found later to have had a blood-alcohol level of .233, nearly three times the legal limit of .08 (though prosecutors and Foley's defense attorneys have agreed on .16). Foley had been there with teammates following a Chargers team dinner and was spotted swaying around the club, hitting on waitresses. His passenger in the car was a woman he had met a few nights earlier and called to meet him at the club.

On October 11, 2006, Foley was charged by prosecutors with two counts of driving under the influence. On May 3, 2007, Foley pleaded guilty to driving under the influence, a misdemeanor, and was given 5 years of informal probation, meaning he does not have to check in with a probation officer. His passenger, Lisa Gaut, was convicted on April 26, 2007, on charges of assault with a deadly weapon and misdemeanor drunken driving for her role in the incident and was sentenced to 180 days in jail with the possibility of a work furlough.

In accordance with the policy of the Coronado police department, Mansker was placed on administrative leave and was reinstated to full duty in January 2007. On December 14, 2007, the San Diego District Attorney declared the shooting legal.

In February 2007, the American Civil Liberties Union sent a letter to the California Attorney General's office on behalf of 25 local community, religious, and civil rights groups criticizing a pattern of questionable police shootings in the San Diego area, asking the state to intervene due to the San Diego District Attorney's problematic handling of these cases, including the Steve Foley incident.

=== Lawsuit against the city of Coronado ===
On January 31, 2007, Foley announced that he was suing the city of Coronado and Aaron Mansker in a civil negligence claim. The complaint does not specify specific damages, only seeking to reclaim medical expenses and "the loss of past and future earnings."

The case went to trial in June 2007. Two weeks into the civil trial, a conditional settlement was announced on July 2, 2007. Terms of the settlement were not immediately disclosed, as Foley and the city of Coronado requested the court to keep the agreement sealed. Both Foley and Mansker left the courtroom without making a statement.

Although settlement terms were not at first disclosed, it was reported a few days later that Foley received a $5.5 million settlement from the city of Coronado.

== NFL career statistics ==
Legend
**Bold**	Career high

=== Regular season ===
Year	Team	Games		Tackles				Interceptions				Fumbles			
Year	Team	GP	GS	Comb	Solo	Ast	Sck	Int	Yds	TD	Lng	FF	FR	Yds	TD
1998	CIN	10	1	12	11	1	2.0	0	0	0	0	0	0	0	0
1999	CIN	16	16	42	39	3	3.5	0	0	0	0	1	**2**	0	0
2000	CIN	16	16	43	34	9	4.0	1	1	0	1	2	1	0	0
2001	CIN	12	12	40	26	14	0.0	0	0	0	0	2	0	0	0
2003	HOU	13	3	31	26	5	1.0	0	0	0	0	0	0	0	0
2004	SDG	16	16	**65**	**48**	**17**	**10.0**	**2**	**4**	0	**4**	**5**	**2**	0	0
2005	SDG	13	13	38	28	10	4.5	0	0	0	0	1	0	0	0
Career		96	77	271	212	59	25.0	3	5	0	4	11	5	0	0

=== Playoffs ===
Year	Team	Games		Tackles				Interceptions				Fumbles			
Year	Team	GP	GS	Comb	Solo	Ast	Sck	Int	Yds	TD	Lng	FF	FR	Yds	TD
2004	SDG	1	1	1	0	1	1.5	0	0	0	0	0	0	0	0
Career		1	1	1	0	1	1.5	0	0	0	0	0	0	0	0
