= Canute Curtis =

American football player and coach (born 1974)

No. 98
- Position: Linebacker

Personal information
- Born: August 4, 1974 (age 52); Amityville, New York, U.S.
- Listed height: 6 ft 2 in (1.88 m)
- Listed weight: 250 lb (113 kg)

Career information
- High school: Farmingdale (Farmingdale, New York)
- College: West Virginia
- NFL draft: 1997: 6th round, 176th overall pick

Career history

Playing
- Cincinnati Bengals (1997–2002)

Coaching
- Towson (2004) Linebackers coach; Tennessee State (2005-2006) Linebackers / Special Teams; Tennessee State (2007) Defensive ends / Special teams; Hampton (2008) Defensive line coach; Towson (2009–2012) Defensive line coach

Awards and highlights
- Consensus All-American (1996); Big East Defensive Player of the Year (1996); WVU Sports Hall of Fame (2011)

Career NFL statistics
- Tackles: 118
- Sacks: 3
- Forced fumbles: 3
- Stats at Pro Football Reference

Canute J. Curtis (born August 4, 1974) is an American former professional football player who was a linebacker for six seasons with the Cincinnati Bengals of the National Football League (NFL). He played college football for the West Virginia Mountaineers, earning consensus All-American honors in 1996. He was selected by the Cincinnati Bengals in the sixth round of the 1997 NFL draft.

After his playing career, he became a coach for multiple college programs.

== Early life ==
Curtis was born in Amityville, New York. He attended Farmingdale High School in Farmingdale, New York, where he played for the Farmingdale high school football team.

== College career ==
Curtis attended West Virginia University, where he played for the West Virginia Mountaineers football team from 1993 to 1996. As a senior in 1996, Curtis led the nation's top-ranked defense by setting the Mountaineers' single-season record for quarterback sacks with 16.5, and also made 11 tackles for a loss. He totaled 67 tackles, forced two fumbles, and had an interception. Curtis was recognized as a consensus first-team All-American, and was named the Big East Conference Defensive Player of the Year. He was also among the finalists for the Dick Butkus Award for best college linebacker and for the Bronko Nagurski Award for best college defensive player. Curtis finished his career as WVU's all-time sack leader with 33.5 sacks.

He also became a member of Alpha Phi Alpha fraternity.

In 2011, Curtis was inducted into the West Virginia University Sports Hall of Fame.

== Professional career ==
The Cincinnati Bengals selected Curtis in the sixth round (176th pick overall) of the 1997 NFL draft. He played for the Bengals from 1997 to 2002. During his six-season pro career, he played in 70 regular season games, started 15 of them, and compiled 87 tackles.

== NFL career statistics ==
Legend
**Bold**	Career high

Year	Team	Games		Tackles				Interceptions				Fumbles			
Year	Team	GP	GS	Comb	Solo	Ast	Sck	Int	Yds	TD	Lng	FF	FR	Yds	TD
1997	CIN	3	0	2	2	0	0.0	0	0	0	0	0	0	0	0
1998	CIN	5	0	2	1	1	0.0	0	0	0	0	0	0	0	0
1999	CIN	15	0	18	15	3	1.0	0	0	0	0	0	0	0	0
2000	CIN	15	0	16	14	2	**2.0**	0	0	0	0	**2**	**1**	0	0
2001	CIN	16	4	29	15	**14**	0.0	0	0	0	0	1	**1**	**3**	0
2002	CIN	16	11	**51**	**42**	9	0.0	0	0	0	0	0	0	0	0
Total		70	15	118	89	29	3.0	0	0	0	0	3	2	3	0

== Coaching career ==
In 2004, Curtis became the linebackers coach at Towson University. In 2005, he became the linebackers coach and special teams coordinator at Tennessee State University. In 2007, he became the defensive ends coach as well as remained the special teams coordinator. In 2008, he was named the defensive line coach at Hampton University. From 2009–2012 he was named the defensive line coach at Hampton.

== Personal life ==
As of 2009, Curtis was married to his wife LaToya and the couple have two children.
