= Oliver Gibson (American football) =

American football player (1972–2025)

No. 98, 99
- Position: Defensive tackle

Personal information
- Born: March 15, 1972; Romeoville, Illinois, U.S.
- Died: June 2025 (aged 53)
- Listed height: 6 ft 2 in (1.88 m)
- Listed weight: 315 lb (143 kg)

Career information
- High school: Romeoville
- College: Notre Dame
- NFL draft: 1995: 4th round, 120th overall pick

Career history
- Pittsburgh Steelers (1995–1998); Cincinnati Bengals (1999–2003); Buffalo Bills (2004)*; Tampa Bay Buccaneers (2004)*
- * Offseason or practice squad member only

Career NFL statistics
- Tackles: 243
- Sacks: 17.5
- Interceptions: 1
- Stats at Pro Football Reference

Oliver Donnovan Gibson (March 15, 1972 – June 29, 2025) was an American professional football player who was a defensive tackle in the National Football League (NFL). He played college football for the Notre Dame Fighting Irish.

Pre-draft measurables
Height	Weight	Arm length	Hand span	40-yard dash	10-yard split	20-yard split	20-yard shuttle	Vertical jump	Broad jump	Bench press
6 ft 2 1/2 in (1.89 m)	283 lb (128 kg)	32 5/8 in (0.83 m)	10 1/8 in (0.26 m)	5.30 s	1.92 s	3.07 s	4.65 s	29.5 in (0.75 m)	8 ft 9 in (2.67 m)	19 reps

Gibson was selected by the Pittsburgh Steelers in the fourth round of the 1995 NFL draft. He played from 1995 to 2003 for the Steelers and Cincinnati Bengals.

In 1989, Gibson was named USA Today High School Football Defensive Player of the Year.

Gibson died on June 29, 2025, at the age of 53.

== NFL career statistics ==
Legend
**Bold**	Career high

Year	Team	Games		Tackles				Interceptions				Fumbles			
Year	Team	GP	GS	Comb	Solo	Ast	Sck	Int	Yds	TD	Lng	FF	FR	Yds	TD
1995	PIT	12	0	2	1	1	0.0	0	0	0	0	0	0	0	0
1996	PIT	16	0	15	7	8	2.5	0	0	0	0	0	0	0	0
1997	PIT	16	0	10	9	1	1.0	0	0	0	0	0	**1**	0	0
1998	PIT	16	0	15	10	5	2.0	0	0	0	0	0	0	0	0
1999	CIN	16	16	41	31	**10**	**4.5**	0	0	0	0	0	**1**	0	0
2000	CIN	16	16	52	43	9	4.0	0	0	0	0	0	0	0	0
2001	CIN	16	16	**55**	**45**	**10**	3.0	0	0	0	0	0	**1**	0	0
2002	CIN	9	9	29	19	**10**	0.0	**1**	**6**	0	**6**	0	0	0	0
2003	CIN	16	0	24	17	7	0.5	0	0	0	0	0	0	0	0
		133	57	243	182	61	17.5	1	6	0	6	0	3	0	0
