= Bruce Coslet =

American football player and coach (born 1946)

No. 88
- Position: Tight end

Personal information
- Born: August 5, 1946 (age 80); Oakdale, California, U.S.
- Listed height: 6 ft 4 in (1.93 m)
- Listed weight: 227 lb (103 kg)

Career information
- High school: Oakdale
- College: Pacific (CA) (1964-1967)
- NFL draft: 1968: undrafted

Career history

Playing
- Edmonton Eskimos (1968)*; Cincinnati Bengals (1969–1976)
- * Offseason or practice squad member only

Coaching
- San Francisco 49ers (1980) Tight ends coach; Cincinnati Bengals (1981–1989); Wide receivers coach (1981–1984); Offensive coordinator, quarterbacks & tight ends coach (1985–1989); New York Jets (1990–1993) Head coach; Cincinnati Bengals (1994–2000); Offensive coordinator & tight ends coach (1994–1996); Interim head coach (1996); Head coach (1997–2000); Dallas Cowboys (2002) Offensive coordinator

Career NFL/AFL statistics
- Receptions: 61
- Receiving yards: 878
- Touchdowns: 9
- Stats at Pro Football Reference

Head coaching record
- Regular season: 47–77 (.379)
- Postseason: 0–1 (.000)
- Career: 47–78 (.376)
- Coaching profile at Pro Football Reference

Bruce Noel Coslet (born August 5, 1946) is an American former professional football player and coach. A tight end, he played for the University of the Pacific and in 1969 debuted with the American Football League (AFL)'s Cincinnati Bengals. He played for the Bengals in the National Football League (NFL) through 1976.

== Early life ==
Coslet was born in Oakdale, California and graduated from Oakdale High School. He played college football at the University of the Pacific before playing for the Cincinnati Bengals from 1969 to 1976.

== Coaching career ==
=== Cincinnati Bengals (1986–1989) ===
Coslet was named the offensive coordinator for the Bengals in 1986 under head coach Sam Wyche. In his first year in the position Cincinnati's offense ranked first in the league in total yards and third in total points scored, and the Bengals finished the season with a 10–6 record. It was not enough, however, for the team to make the playoffs as they were one of four teams in the AFC that finished 10–6 and did not have any tiebreakers favoring them. In 1987 the Bengals ranked fifth in total yards under Coslet, but failed to score many points and finished the season with a 4–11 record.

The Bengals' best was yet to come, however, and Coslet's offensive unit finished with the top scoring and top yardage producing offense in 1988. It helped the Bengals finish 12–4 and reach the Super Bowl, only for them to lose to the San Francisco 49ers. Although Cincinnati failed to return to the playoffs in 1989, Coslet's unit was again in the top five in the league as they scored the fourth most points and produced the third most total yards in the NFL.

With his successes as an assistant, Coslet found himself highly sought after as a head coach and was hired by the New York Jets for the 1990 season.

=== New York Jets (1990–1993) ===
Coslet took over a Jets team that had finished 4–12 under Joe Walton the year before and improved the team's fortunes slightly. The Jets were hovering around .500 for the first half of the season, but a five-game losing streak took away any hope of that. The Jets finished 6–10, winning their last two games of the year against the New England Patriots and the Tampa Bay Buccaneers.

In 1991, the Jets did not start out particularly well as, after an opening week win against Tampa Bay, the team dropped their next three games. Coslet led the team to six wins in their next eight games, putting the Jets into playoff contention at 7–5. After losing their next three games, however, the Jets were left at 7–8. Still, the Jets were in control of their own playoff destiny as a win in Week 17 would ensure a Wild Card berth. The Jets knocked off the Miami Dolphins on the road in the finale, giving Coslet his first playoff berth as a head coach. Their matchup in the wild-card round was against the Houston Oilers, which they lost.

Coslet's 1992 team was decimated by injuries and hampered by ineffective coaching by Coslet thereby not doing any favors for the new starting quarterback Browning Nagle, who was named the starter after longtime veteran starter Ken O'Brien held out for most of the first half of the season. Two of the injuries proved to be career ending. In Week 10 against the Denver Broncos, star receiver Al Toon suffered the ninth concussion of his career and was forced to retire after the game. Then, in Week 13 against the Kansas City Chiefs, a collision between defensive ends Scott Mersereau and Dennis Byrd left Byrd with a broken neck and temporarily paralyzed. Although the Jets finished 4–12, two of the wins came against AFC East division champion Miami and the eventual AFC champion Buffalo Bills.

The Jets retained Coslet for 1993, and even made an effort to upgrade the quarterback position by trading for veteran Boomer Esiason, whom Coslet had coached during his time in Cincinnati. However, he was given a clear directive by management: if the Jets did not make the playoffs in 1993, Coslet would be fired at the end of the season regardless of the team's record. Things did not start off well, as after the first six games the Jets were 2–4 and entering a Halloween matchup with their in-stadium rivals, the 5–1 Giants. The Jets managed to pull off an upset, defeating the Giants 10–6, and carried that momentum to victories in their next four games, capped off by a 6–0 win against the rival Patriots to get to 7–4.

After that, however, the Jets’ fortunes changed drastically. Their winning streak was broken by the lowly Indianapolis Colts, who had only recorded three wins and had lost seven of their previous eight games. The Jets then traveled to Washington to face the struggling Redskins, who had also only won three games, but only managed to eke out a 3–0 win. A 28–7 blowout loss to the defending world champion Dallas Cowboys at home followed, and after a 16–14 loss in Buffalo the Jets were left with a must-win game in Week 18 against the Houston Oilers. The Oilers had entered the game on a ten-game winning streak and had not lost a game in the Astrodome all season; the overmatched Jets lost 24–0. Five days later on January 7, 1994, having refused to give up calling the shots for the offense, Coslet was fired and Pete Carroll was promoted to head coach.

=== Return to the Bengals (1994–2000) ===
In 1994 Coslet returned to the Bengals, who were now coached by Dave Shula, and retook his offensive coordinator position. Cincinnati was not the same place that Coslet had left, as the team was now one of the most consistently losing teams in the league. In his first two years as coordinator Coslet's offensive unit hovered around the middle of the league in yards and points scored while the Bengals won a combined 10 games. The team did start to show some bright spots on offense, beginning with a change in philosophy. After seven games the Bengals finally gave up on disappointing first round draft pick David Klingler and benched him in favor of Jeff Blake, whom the team had signed away from the Jets where Coslet had coached him. The change paid dividends immediately and Blake nearly beat the two-time defending Super Bowl champion Dallas Cowboys in his first start. Blake developed a rapport with young wide receivers Carl Pickens and Darnay Scott, who were his two main targets, and Coslet's playcalling used that to the team's advantage.

In Coslet's first season back, Pickens had over 1,000 yards receiving on 71 catches and the rookie Scott added 866 on 46 receptions; by comparison, the 1993 Bengals saw no receiver record more than 56 catches or 654 yards (both done by receiver Jeff Query, who only recorded five catches in the new system). Coslet's offensive unit improved somewhat in 1995, as Blake threw for over 3,800 yards and made the Pro Bowl while Pickens recorded 17 receiving touchdowns and 1,234 yards to join Blake. Scott recorded 821 yards, and tight end Tony McGee caught 55 passes for 754 yards. Although the yardage was not there, Coslet's offense finished fourth in the league in total touchdowns with 29.

After a 1–6 start to the 1996 season, Shula announced his resignation and Coslet was promoted to the head coaching position. Although the Bengals once again failed to make the playoffs, Coslet led the team to a 7–2 finish and the offensive unit was back in the NFL's top 10. Pickens and Scott again proved to be an effective 1–2 combination, as Pickens caught 100 passes and topped 1,000 yards for the third straight year while Scott added 58 catches for 833 yards. Blake threw for 3,624 yards, but it was not good enough to make the Pro Bowl; Pickens was the offense's only representative.

Although Coslet saw the team take a slight step backward, finishing at 7–9 in 1997, the offense again finished in the top ten in points scored and total yards. Most of that was due to the re-emergence of Boomer Esiason, who the Bengals reacquired in the offseason and who replaced a largely ineffective Blake with five games left in the season. Esiason won four of those starts, with his only loss coming in a game against the Philadelphia Eagles where he threw four touchdown passes only to be beat on a late field goal. Esiason threw 13 touchdown passes against two interceptions in his limited action. Although Scott and Pickens' receiving statistics went down considerably- Scott led the team with 54 catches and 797 yards, while Pickens only managed 52 catches in 695 yards while missing four games- the offense found a new star in emerging rookie running back Corey Dillon, who amassed over 1,100 yards despite only making six total starts.

The 1998 Bengals took a nosedive, finishing at 3–13. Coslet elected to give the starting job to veteran Neil O'Donnell, who had just been released from a multimillion-dollar long-term deal he'd signed with the Jets prior to the 1996 season. O'Donnell, Blake, Paul Justin and Eric Kresser all saw action as starting quarterback that year, with O'Donnell leading the team in wins with just two. Despite this, Pickens returned to form leading the team in catches and yards while Scott led the team with seven touchdowns. Dillon became the full-time starting halfback and rushed for 1,100 yards again.

Coslet's 1999 team did little better, and started out by losing ten of its first eleven games. Blake was once again the starter for most of the year, with rookie Akili Smith getting four starts. Blake managed to throw for 2,670 yards and 16 touchdowns despite only winning three of his starts, while Smith showed the struggles that would come to define his career by only throwing two touchdowns versus six interceptions. Although the offense struggled, Dillon again topped a thousand yards by rushing for exactly 1,200 (Note: During a 44–28 late season victory over the Browns, Coslet took Dillon out in the third quarter after he had gained 246 yards, a performance which otherwise had him well on his way to breaking the 22-year-old record of 275, set by Walter Payton, who had died the month before. After the game, Coslet was praised by sportswriters after he explained to them that he had taken Dillon out because Payton had set that record in a 10–7 victory.) and Scott topped 1,000 receiving yards and led the team in catches, yards, and touchdowns. Pickens could only manage 57 catches for 737 yards. In addition, Pickens was highly critical of Coslet toward the end of the season, and denounced the team for keeping him on despite the last two seasons.

In the 1999 offseason, the Bengals decided to overhaul their roster. Blake was allowed to leave in free agency and signed with the New Orleans Saints. Pickens was released and played out his final season with the Tennessee Titans. Scott did not play at all in the 2000 season, and Smith was named the starter. The focus of the offense was to be on Dillon, Scott, and highly touted #1 draft pick Peter Warrick. However, Coslet saw his team struggle in their first game as a unit against the newly reformed Cleveland Browns and lost 24–7. The next week, the Jacksonville Jaguars shut out Coslet's team 14–0. After their third consecutive loss, this one a 37–0 blowout against the eventual Super Bowl Champion Baltimore Ravens, Coslet resigned the next day out of frustration and handed control of the team to defensive coordinator Dick LeBeau.

=== Dallas Cowboys (2002) ===
After a year off, Coslet was hired by Cowboys head coach Dave Campo to serve as his offensive coordinator. Coslet's unit ranked near the bottom of the league in both points scored and total yards. Under Coslet, Emmitt Smith saw his streak of 1,000 yard seasons broken at eleven despite his setting of the NFL's all-time rushing yardage record. Smith also only managed five rushing touchdowns, two off his career low. Neither of his starting quarterbacks, Chad Hutchinson or Quincy Carter, were effective either. After a 5–11 finish, the third straight under Campo, Bill Parcells was hired as head coach and Coslet was not retained. He has not held a coaching position since.

== Personal life ==
Coslet is a member of the Delta Upsilon fraternity.

== Head coaching record ==
Team	Year	Regular season					Postseason			
Team	Year	Won	Lost	Ties	Win %	Finish	Won	Lost	Win %	Result
NYJ	1990	6	10	0	.375	4th in AFC East	-	-	-	
NYJ	1991	8	8	0	.500	2nd in AFC East	0	1	.000	Lost to Houston Oilers in AFC Wild Card Game
NYJ	1992	4	12	0	.250	4th in AFC East	-	-	-	
NYJ	1993	8	8	0	.500	3rd in AFC East	-	-	-	
NYJ Total		26	38	0	.406		0	1	.000	
CIN	1996	7	2	0	.778	3rd in AFC Central	-	-	-	
CIN	1997	7	9	0	.438	4th in AFC Central	-	-	-	
CIN	1998	3	13	0	.188	5th in AFC Central	-	-	-	
CIN	1999	4	12	0	.250	5th in AFC Central	-	-	-	
CIN	2000	0	3	0	.000	(fired)	-	-	-	
CIN Total		21	39	0	.350		-	-	-	
Total		47	77	0	.379		0	1	.000	

== See also ==
- List of American Football League players
