= Andre Purvis =

American football player (born 1973)

No. 97, 99
- Positions: Defensive line, offensive lineman

Personal information
- Born: July 14, 1973 (age 53); Jacksonville, North Carolina, U.S.
- Listed height: 6 ft 4 in (1.93 m)
- Listed weight: 310 lb (141 kg)

Career information
- High school: White Oak (Jacksonville, North Carolina); Swansboro (Swansboro, North Carolina)
- College: North Carolina
- NFL draft: 1997: 5th round, 144th overall pick

Career history
- Cincinnati Bengals (1997–1999); Orlando Rage (2001); Carolina Cobras (2002)

Career NFL statistics
- GP/GS: 21/1
- Tackles: 11
- Sacks: 1
- Stats at Pro Football Reference

Career AFL statistics
- Tackles: 4
- Fumble recoveries: 1
- Stats at ArenaFan.com

Andre Purvis (born July 14, 1973) is an American former professional football player who was a defensive tackle for the Cincinnati Bengals of the National Football League (NFL). He played college football for the North Carolina Tar Heels. He was selected by the Bengals in the fifth round of the 1997 NFL draft.

== Early life ==
Purvis originally attended White Oak High School, in Jacksonville, North Carolina, before transferring to Swansboro High School to be closer to his ill grandmother, there he enjoyed much success for the east Carolina school. After graduating high school, he attended North Carolina where the played three seasons as a reserve defensive lineman, playing behind Marcus Jones. As a redshirt freshman, in a 1993 game against Tulane, Purvis recovered two blocked punts in the end zone for touchdowns. Then as a senior in 1996, he recorded 24 tackles, 4.5 tackle-for-loss, 2.5 sacks and 14 quarterback pressures. For the season, he was named team's most improved player. He graduated from North Carolina with a degree in communications.

== Professional career ==
=== National Football League (NFL) ===
Purvis was drafted by the Cincinnati Bengals in the fifth round (144th overall) of the 1997 NFL draft. He played three seasons for the Bengals. As a rookie, he appeared in seven games with one start (against the New York Giants) during Week 8. For the season he recorded three tackles. In 1998 he spent the first eight weeks of the season on the inactive list. He appeared in the final nine games as a back-up nose guard. For the season he recorded six tackles and his only career sack, against John Elway. For the 1999 season, he appeared in five games recording two tackles.

=== XFL ===
After spending a year away from football, Purvis was selected in the 18th round (141st overall) of the XFL Player Allocation and Selection System draft by the Orlando Rage. While with the Rage, he recorded 11 tackles and 1.5 sacks.

=== Arena Football League (AFL) ===
After the XFL folded, Purvis joined the Carolina Cobras of the Arena Football League (AFL) for one season. In his lone season with the Cobras, he recorded four tackles and one fumble recovery.
