= Robert Bean (gridiron football) =

American gridiron football player (born 1978)

No. 49, 23, 22
- Position: CB

Personal information
- Born: January 6, 1978 (age 48); Atlanta, Georgia, U.S.
- Listed height: 5 ft 11 in (1.80 m)
- Listed weight: 180 lb (82 kg)

Career information
- College: Mississippi State University
- NFL draft: 2000: 5th round, 133rd overall pick

Career history
- 2000–2001: Cincinnati Bengals
- 2002: Jacksonville Jaguars
- 2004: BC Lions*
- 2004: Los Angeles Avengers
- 2004: BC Lions*
- 2005: San Jose SaberCats
- 2006–2008: Winnipeg Blue Bombers
- * Offseason or practice squad member only

Awards and highlights
- First-team All-SEC (1999)
- Stats at Pro Football Reference
- Stats at CFL.ca (archive)

Robert D. Bean Jr. (born January 6, 1978) is an American former professional football cornerback. He was selected by the Cincinnati Bengals in the fifth round of the 2000 NFL draft. He played college football for the Mississippi State Bulldogs.

Bean was also a member of the Jacksonville Jaguars, Los Angeles Avengers, B.C. Lions, San Jose SaberCats and Winnipeg Blue Bombers.

== Early life ==
Bean attended Lakeside High School in Atlanta, Georgia and was a letterman in football track and basketball his entire high school career. In football, he was a four-year starter at wide receiver, cornerback and free safety. To this date he holds the triple jump record from his senior year of 1996.

== College career ==
Bean spent two seasons at Mississippi State University following a two-year stint at Georgia Military College. He played in 23 games for the Bulldogs. He earned All-SEC second-team honors in 1998 after registering five interceptions, two blocked kicks, nine passes defended and 33 defensive tackles. Bean started all 11 games at left cornerback in 1999. He finished the season with four blocked punts, 44 defensive tackles, including 31 solo tackles, one interception, 13 passes defended and a fumble recovery. He added a blocked field goal in the Peach Bowl.

== Professional career ==
=== Cincinnati Bengals ===
Bean was selected by the Cincinnati Bengals in the fifth round of the 2000 NFL draft. In his rookie season, Bean played in 12 games, totaling 23 tackles and one interception.

He played in 15 games for the Bengals in 2001, getting 43 tackles.

=== Jacksonville Jaguars ===
Before the 2002 season, Bean was traded to the Jacksonville Jaguars.

During the season, Bean only registered two tackles. A restricted free agent after the season, Bean re-signed on March 7, 2003.

After not playing during the 2003 season, Bean was released on March 21, 2003.

=== Detroit Lions (first stint) ===
Bean attended the British Columbia Lions training camp in 2004.

=== Los Angeles Avengers ===
After being released by the Lions, Bean signed with the Los Angeles Avengers.

=== Detroit Lions (second stint) ===
Bean signed with the British Columbia Lions a second time and spent time on their practice roster during the 2004 season.

=== San Jose SaberCats ===
Bean briefly played for the San Jose SaberCats in 2005.

=== Winnipeg Blue Bombers ===
On May 2, 2006, Bean signed with the Winnipeg Blue Bombers. In his first season in Winnipeg, Bean led the team in interceptions with four. He had 22 tackles and two more with the special teams unit.

In 2007, Bean missed six games due to injury. He got a career high 45 tackles.
