= Damian Vaughn =

American football player (born 1975)

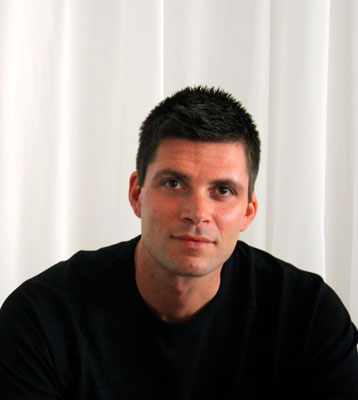

No. 83,88
- Position: Tight end

Personal information
- Born: June 14, 1975 (age 51); Anchorage, Alaska, U.S.

Career information
- College: Miami University

Career history
- 1998–2000: Cincinnati Bengals
- 2001–2002: Tampa Bay Buccaneers

Awards and highlights
- First-team All-MAC (1997)

Damian Medeiros da Silva Vaughn (born June 14, 1975) is an American former professional football tight end for the Cincinnati Bengals (1998–2000) and Tampa Bay Buccaneers (2001–2002). As the first Brazilian NFL player, Vaughn has made efforts to promote awareness and interest in American football among Brazilians, including a trip to Brazil with Tony Gonzalez in 2003. Following his career in football, Vaughn has remained active in the athletics world by founding the Vaughn Center, which offers meditation and leadership training for athletes.

== Early life and education ==
Vaughn was born in Anchorage, Alaska, to an American father and a Brazilian mother. When he was six months old, his family moved to Divinópolis, Minas Gerais, his mother's home city, where they stayed until he was five, before moving back to the United States.

Vaughn attended Orrville High School and went on to study Spanish and international business at Miami University in Ohio. He also studied cognitive neuroscience and consciousness at the University of Arizona and interpersonal neurobiology and the science of mindful awareness at the Mindsight Institute in Los Angeles. He is currently enrolled in a positive psychology program at Claremont Graduate University pursuing his PhD.

He has dual citizenship, American and Brazilian.

== Football career ==
After playing as a walk-on for the Miami Redskins, Vaughn was drafted in 1998 by the Cincinnati Bengals with the 33rd pick in the seventh round of the draft. He played tight end for the Bengals from 1998–2000 and for the Tampa Bay Buccaneers from 2001-2002.

Continuing his career on an international level, Vaughn played for the Barcelona Dragons in NFL Europe. In 2000, Vaughn caught 40 passes for 326 yards, which earned him a selection on the All-NFLEL team. His last year in professional football was 2002, when he caught seven passes for 35 yards for the Dragons; his season, and career, were cut short by injury.

== Business career ==
Following his retirement from professional football, Vaughn established himself as a successful entrepreneur. He began by co-founding a countertop manufacturing venture that quickly grew into a multimillion-dollar business. He subsequently founded Terra Mar Stone, an importer and wholesaler of rare and exotic stone for commercial application. Damian raised millions of dollars in private equity financing for the company, which went on to achieve seven-figure numbers in gross revenues. He also founded a manufacturing company in Brazil, where he holds dual citizenship.

== The Vaughn Center ==
In 2009, Damian founded the Vaughn Center, a facility in Scottsdale, Arizona that helps athletes focus on their minds and bodies through meditation. The Vaughn Center is located within the Agave Spa at the Westin Kierland Resort & Spa.

=== Coaching ===
Damian Vaughn is a professional speaker for athletes, coaches, and corporate audiences. He holds various coaching programs, both in-season and off-season, at The Vaughn Center.

=== Meditation with the Mind and Body ===
Damian initially turned to meditation as a means of dealing with the extreme mental and physical challenges of an NFL career. After retirement, Damian became a Certified Teacher of Primordial Sound Mediation through the Chopra Center, and now travels across the country giving lectures on meditation, talking about experiencing the different "zones" in sports and finding our own heightened state of awareness.

== Personal ==
Originally from Orrville, Ohio, Vaughn currently resides in Phoenix, Arizona with his wife Nicole and their three children; a daughter, Chloe Rose and two son; Roman Joseph and Jude.

Damian is trilingual, speaking English, Portuguese, and Spanish.
