= Ric Mathias =

American football player (born 1975)

No. 24
- Position: Defensive back

Personal information
- Born: December 10, 1975 (age 50); Monroe, Wisconsin
- Listed height: 5 ft 9 in (1.75 m)
- Listed weight: 180 lb (82 kg)

Career information
- High school: Monroe
- College: Wisconsin–La Crosse
- NFL draft: 1998: undrafted

Career history
- Indianapolis Colts (1998); Cincinnati Bengals (1998–1999)
- Stats at Pro Football Reference

Ric Mathias (born December 10, 1975) was a player in the US National Football League for the Cincinnati Bengals in 1998 as a defensive back.

== Biography ==
Mathias was born on December 10, 1975, in Monroe, Wisconsin. He attended Monroe High School. He played football at the University of Wisconsin–La Crosse. Before joining the Cincinnati Bengals, he was with the Indianapolis Colts earlier in 1998. He sat out the entire 1999 season because of a knee injury.
