= Kelvin Moore (American football) =

American football player (born 1975)

No. 29
- Position: Safety

Personal information
- Born: March 7, 1975 (age 51); Los Angeles, California, U.S.
- Listed height: 6 ft 0 in (1.83 m)
- Listed weight: 210 lb (95 kg)

Career information
- High school: Alexander Hamilton (Los Angeles)
- College: Santa Monica (1993–1994); Iowa State (1995); Morgan State (1997)
- NFL draft: 1998: undrafted

Career history
- Cincinnati Bengals (1998–1999)

Awards and highlights
- First-team All-Western State Conference (1994)

Career NFL statistics
- Games played: 4
- Tackles: 3
- Stats at Pro Football Reference

Kelvin B. Moore (born March 7, 1975) is an American former professional football safety who played for the Cincinnati Bengals of the National Football League (NFL). He played college football for the Santa Monica Corsairs, Iowa State Cyclones and Morgan State Bears.

== Early life ==
Moore was born on March 7, 1975, in Los Angeles, California. He attended Alexander Hamilton High School in Los Angeles.

== College career ==
Moore played college football for the Santa Monica Corsairs from 1993 to 1994, Iowa State Cyclones in 1995 and Morgan State Bears in 1997. In 1994, he earned first-team All-Western State Conference honors.

== Professional career ==
After going unselected in the 1998 NFL draft, Moore signed with the Cincinnati Bengals as an undrafted free agent. On August 25, he was released. On September 24, Moore was signed to the Bengals' practice squad. On December 3, he was elevated to the active roster. Moore played in the last four games and made three tackles.

On August 20, 1999, in a preseason contest against the Detroit Lions, Moore broke the first vertebra in his neck attempting tackle wide receiver, Brian Stablein. He hit his head into the receiver's knee and was taken to a hospital in Pontiac, Michigan. The team doctor reported that Moore had feeling in his arms and legs but this injury ended his career.
