= Brad Costello =

American football player (born 1974)

No. 6, 12
- Position: Punter

Personal information
- Born: December 24, 1974 (age 51); Moorestown, New Jersey, U.S.
- Listed height: 6 ft 0 in (1.83 m)
- Listed weight: 231 lb (105 kg)

Career information
- High school: Holy Cross Academy (Delran, New Jersey)
- College: Michigan State; Boston University
- NFL draft: 1998: undrafted

Career history
- Cincinnati Bengals (1998–1999); New England Patriots (2000–2001)*; Scottish Claymores (2001)
- * Offseason or practice squad member only

Awards and highlights
- PFWA All-Rookie Team (1998); Yankee leading punter (1996); A-10 leading punter (1997)

Career NFL statistics
- Punts: 32
- Punting yards: 1,239
- Longest punt: 73
- Kickoff yards: 1,829
- Kickoff average: 53.8
- Stats at Pro Football Reference

Bradford Lance Costello (born December 24, 1974) is an American former professional football player who was a punter in the National Football League (NFL). He played college football for the Michigan State Spartans and Boston University Terriers. Professionally, he played for the Cincinnati Bengals of the National Football League (NFL) and the Scottish Claymores of NFL Europe.
