= Damon Griffin =

American football player (born 1976)

No. 87
- Position: Wide receiver

Personal information
- Born: June 14, 1976 (age 50); Monrovia, California, U.S.
- Listed height: 5 ft 9 in (1.75 m)
- Listed weight: 186 lb (84 kg)

Career information
- College: Oregon
- NFL draft: 1999: undrafted

Career history
- San Francisco 49ers (1999)*; Cincinnati Bengals (1999–2000); St. Louis Rams (2001)
- * Offseason or practice squad member only

Awards and highlights
- Second-team All-Pac-10 (1996)

Career NFL statistics
- Receptions: 14
- Yards: 137
- Touchdowns: 0
- Stats at Pro Football Reference

Damon Gilbert Griffin (born June 14, 1976) is an American former professional football player who was a wide receiver in the National Football League (NFL). He played college football for the Oregon Ducks and was signed by the San Francisco 49ers as an undrafted free agent in 1999.

Griffin also played for the Cincinnati Bengals and St. Louis Rams.
