= Adrian Ross (American football) =

American football player (born 1975)

No. 57
- Position: Linebacker

Personal information
- Born: February 19, 1975 (age 51); Santa Clara, California, U.S.
- Listed height: 6 ft 2 in (1.88 m)
- Listed weight: 245 lb (111 kg)

Career information
- High school: Elk Grove (Elk Grove, California)
- College: Colorado State
- NFL draft: 1998: undrafted

Career history
- Cincinnati Bengals (1998–2003); Pittsburgh Steelers (1999)*
- * Offseason or practice squad member only

Career NFL statistics
- Games played: 90
- Tackles: 185
- Sacks: 3
- Interceptions: 1
- Stats at Pro Football Reference

Adrian Lamont Ross (born February 19, 1975) is an American former professional football player who was a linebacker in the National Football League (NFL). He played college football for the Colorado State Rams and was signed by the Cincinnati Bengals as an undrafted free agent in 1998.
