= Rod Jones (offensive lineman) =

American football player (born 1974)

No. 60
- Position: Offensive tackle

Personal information
- Born: January 11, 1974 (age 52); Detroit, Michigan, U.S.
- Listed height: 6 ft 4 in (1.93 m)
- Listed weight: 325 lb (147 kg)

Career information
- High school: Ford (Detroit)
- College: Kansas
- NFL draft: 1996: 7th round, 219th overall pick

Career history
- Cincinnati Bengals (1996–2000); St. Louis Rams (2001); Washington Redskins (2002)

Awards and highlights
- Second-team All-Big Eight (1995)

Career NFL statistics
- Games played: 62
- Games started: 38
- Stats at Pro Football Reference

Rodrek Edward Jones (born January 11, 1974) is an American former professional football player who was an offensive tackle for six seasons in the National Football League (NFL). He played college football for the Kansas Jayhawks and was selected 219th overall by the Cincinnati Bengals in the seventh round of the 1996 NFL draft. He started in Super Bowl XXXVI for the St. Louis Rams.
