= Jevon Langford =

American football player (born 1974)

No. 94, 58
- Position: Defensive end

Personal information
- Born: February 16, 1974 (age 52); Washington, D.C., U.S.
- Listed height: 6 ft 3 in (1.91 m)
- Listed weight: 290 lb (132 kg)

Career information
- High school: Archbishop Carroll (Washington, D.C.)
- College: Oklahoma State
- NFL draft: 1996: 4th round, 108th overall pick

Career history
- Cincinnati Bengals (1996–2001)

Awards and highlights
- Second-team All-Big Eight (1994)

Career NFL statistics
- Tackles: 114
- Sacks: 3.5
- Interceptions: 1
- Stats at Pro Football Reference

Jevon Dicorious Langford (born February 16, 1974) is an American former professional football player who was a defensive end for six seasons with the Cincinnati Bengals of the National Football League (NFL). He played college football for the Oklahoma State Cowboys and was selected in the fourth round of the 1996 NFL draft.
