= Chisholm Trail Parkway =

Controlled-access toll road in Texas, U.S.

Chisholm Trail Parkway
- Southwest Parkway
- Chisholm Trail Parkway highlighted in red

Route information
- Maintained by NTTA
- Length: 27.6 mi (44.4 km)
- Existed: May 11, 2014–present

Major junctions
- South end: US 67 near Cleburne
- I-20 in Fort Worth
- North end: I-30 / US 377 in Fort Worth

Location
- Country: United States
- State: Texas
- Counties: Johnson, Tarrant

Highway system
- Highways in Texas; Interstate; US; State; Former; Toll; Loops; Spurs; FM/RM; Park; Rec

The Chisholm Trail Parkway is a controlled-access toll road operated by the North Texas Tollway Authority (NTTA) in Tarrant and Johnson counties connecting the central business district of the city of Fort Worth at Interstate 30 to US 67 in Cleburne.

The parkway is a 27.6-mile (44.4 km) two- to six-lane freeway along the route of an extension of State Highway 121. Environmental clearance for the project was received in June 2005. Initial construction began in April 2010. The Chisholm Trail Parkway opened to traffic on May 11, 2014. The cost of the parkway was approximately $1.4 billion.

The segment of the parkway from FM 1187 to I-30 in Tarrant County was originally named Southwest Parkway. Legislation renaming that segment was passed in May 2011.

As of the fall of 2025, Chisholm Trail Parkway is undergoing a major $250 million widening project. The North Texas Tollway Authority (NTTA) is actively expanding a 13-mile stretch of the toll road from FM 1187 in Tarrant County to US 67 in Johnson County. Construction for the tollway's expansion should be completed by the calendar year 2028.

== Route description ==
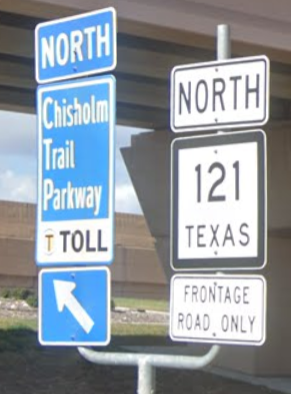
Frontage road signage showing both a CTP and SH 121 shield near Overton Ridge Blvd.

The tollway starts at an interchange with US 67 in northern Cleburne, near SH 171. The first main lane toll gantry is between Sparks Road and Johnson County Road 904. At the interchange with FM 917 the tollway enters the southwestern tip of Burleson, near Joshua. FM 1902 runs parallel to the tollway from here to FM 1187. Just north of Johnson County Road 920, the Chisholm Trail Parkway crosses into Tarrant County. The interchange with FM 1187 is just to the west of Crowley. The second main lane toll gantry is near Stewart Feltz Road. Near Benbrook, the tollway has a complex stack interchange with I-20 and SH 183. The third and final main lane toll gantry is just before the University Drive exit. The Chisholm Trail Parkway ends at an interchange with I-30 near University Drive and Vickery Boulevard in Fort Worth, near TCU.

== History ==
The Chisholm Trail Parkway was built as a collaboration between NTTA, TxDOT, NCTCOG, the cities of Cleburne, Burleson, and Fort Worth, and the Fort Worth & Western and Union Pacific Railroads.

About halfway between Fort Worth and Cleburne, a mixed use development is planned to be built along the corridor. Chisholm Trail Ranch will feature a movie theater and several restaurants, as well as residential areas. As part of the tollway's initial plans, Old Granbury Road was closed permanently on October 7, 2013, where it crosses the toll road and ends at a cul-de-sac.

The toll road was built in stages from 2008 to early 2014. Unlike many toll roads in North Texas, the entire length of the highway opened all at once, although the portion south of FM 1187 is initially a two-lane road.

The City of Fort Worth Public Art program cooperated with the parkway to add ten monumental glass and stone columnar “Watershed Crossing Markers” in the first eight and a half miles within the Fort Worth city limits, heading north, and twelve "Trinity Water Fowls" murals on the six monuments of the East Clearfork crossing bridge. The columns and monument murals, created by public artist Norie Sato, feature mosaics showing wildlife of the Trinity River watershed, utilizing images from local photographers.

Most of the CTP in Fort Worth north of Interstate 20 had an unusually low speed limit of 50 MPH when it first opened to traffic in 2014. The low speed limit was enacted by the city of Fort Worth to minimize noise from passing traffic as the tollway passed through or near older neighborhoods. On September 1, 2016, the speed limit on the tollway between University Drive and Arborlawn Drive was raised from 50 MPH to 60 with the section between Arborlawn and Alta Mesa Boulevard being raised from 60 to 65.

=== Further construction ===
As of the fall of 2025, Chisholm Trail Parkway is undergoing a major $250 million widening project. The North Texas Tollway Authority (NTTA) is actively expanding a 13-mile stretch of the toll road from FM 1187 in Tarrant County to US 67 in Johnson County. Construction for the tollway's expansion should be completed by the calendar year 2028.

== Tolls ==
As of August 2020, it costs a two-axle passenger vehicle $8.70 in cash to drive the entire length of the toll road in either direction. Two-axle vehicles paying with TollTag are only charged $5.79 for the same trip.

== Exit list ==
All exits are unnumbered.

County	Location	mi	km	Destinations	Notes
Johnson	Cleburne	0.0	0.0	US 67 to SH 171 / Nolan River Road	At-grade intersection with US 67 frontage roads; future interchange
Johnson	Cleburne	0.1	0.16	County Road 1216	At-grade intersection; southern terminus of freeway
Johnson	Cleburne	0.9	1.4	County Road 1125	Southbound exit and northbound entrance
Johnson	Cleburne	1.8	2.9	Sparks Road	Tolled northbound exit and southbound entrance
Johnson		3.1	5.0	CR 904 / Sparks Road Main Lane Gantry	
Johnson		3.9	6.3	County Road 904	Tolled southbound exit and northbound entrance
Johnson	Burleson	5.9	9.5	FM 917 – Joshua, Godley	Tolled southbound exit and northbound entrance
Johnson	Burleson	7.6	12.2	County Road 913	Tolled southbound exit and northbound entrance
Johnson		9.7	15.6	FM 1902	
Johnson		11.8	19.0	County Road 920	Tolled northbound exit and southbound entrance
Tarrant		13.2	21.2	FM 1187 – Crowley	Tolled northbound exit and southbound entrance
Tarrant	Fort Worth	15.3	24.6	Stewart Feltz Main Lane Gantry	
Tarrant	Fort Worth	16.5	26.6	McPherson Boulevard	Tolled southbound exit and northbound entrance
Tarrant	Fort Worth	17.1	27.5	Sycamore School Road	Tolled southbound exit and northbound entrance
Tarrant	Fort Worth	19.2	30.9	Altamesa Boulevard	Tolled southbound exit and northbound entrance
Tarrant	Fort Worth	20.4	32.8	Oakmont Boulevard	Tolled southbound exit and northbound entrance
Tarrant	Fort Worth	21.5	34.6	SH 183 west / Overton Ridge Boulevard	No direct southbound exit to SH 183 (signed at Arborlawn Drive)
Tarrant	Fort Worth	22.0	35.4	I-20 – Abilene, Dallas	No direct northbound exit to I-20 west or southbound exit to I-20 east; exit 432 on I-20
Tarrant	Fort Worth	23.0	37.0	Arborlawn Drive	Tolled northbound exit and southbound entrance
Tarrant	Fort Worth	24.2	38.9	Edwards Ranch Road	Tolled northbound exit and southbound entrance
Tarrant	Fort Worth	25.8	41.5	Montgomery Main Lane Gantry	
Tarrant	Fort Worth	26.0	41.8	Montgomery Street / Rosedale Street / University Drive	Northbound exit and southbound entrance
Tarrant	Fort Worth	26.7	43.0	I-30 east (US 377 north) / Cherry Street / Lancaster Avenue – Dallas, Convention Center	Northbound exit and southbound entrance; exits 12B-13 on I-30
Tarrant	Fort Worth	27.9	44.9	Forest Park Boulevard	At-grade intersection
1.000 mi = 1.609 km; 1.000 km = 0.621 mi: Electronic toll collection; Incomplete access; Unopened
