= Jon Kitna =

American football player and coach (born 1972)

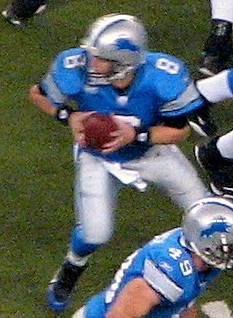
- Kitna with the Detroit Lions in 2007

Lakota East High School
- Title: Head coach

Personal information
- Born: September 21, 1972 (age 54); Tacoma, Washington, U.S.
- Listed height: 6 ft 2 in (1.88 m)
- Listed weight: 220 lb (100 kg)

Career information
- High school: Lincoln (Tacoma)
- College: Central Washington (1991–1995)
- NFL draft: 1996: undrafted

Career history

Playing
- Seattle Seahawks (1996–2000); → Barcelona Dragons (1997); Cincinnati Bengals (2001–2005); Detroit Lions (2006–2008); Dallas Cowboys (2009–2011, 2013)

Coaching
- Lincoln High School (2012–2014) Head coach; Waxahachie High School (2015–2017) Head coach; Brophy College Preparatory (2018) Head coach; Dallas Cowboys (2019) Quarterbacks coach; Burleson High School (2020–2022) Head coach; Lakota East High School (2023–present) Head coach

Awards and highlights
- NFL Comeback Player of the Year (2003); PFWA NFL Comeback Player of the Year (2003); World Bowl champion (1997); World Bowl MVP (1997); NAIA Division II national champion (1995); NAIA All-American (1995); 3× All-Mount Rainier League (1993–1995); Central Washington Wildcats No. 3 retired

Career NFL statistics
- Passing attempts: 4,442
- Passing completions: 2,677
- Completion percentage: 60.3%
- TD–INT: 169–165
- Passing yards: 29,745
- Passer rating: 77.4
- Stats at Pro Football Reference

Jon Kelly Kitna (born September 21, 1972) is an American former professional football player who was a quarterback in the National Football League (NFL) for the Seattle Seahawks, Cincinnati Bengals, Detroit Lions, and Dallas Cowboys. He played college football for the Central Washington Wildcats and was signed by the Seahawks as an undrafted free agent in 1996. He is currently the head football coach at Lakota East High School in Ohio.

== Early life ==
Kitna was born and raised in Tacoma, Washington. He attended Concordia Lutheran School, before transferring to Lincoln High School after his freshman season. He lettered in football, basketball, and baseball.

He enrolled at Central Washington University. He walked on to the football team and was named the starting quarterback as a true freshman over Beau Baldwin. He passed for 1,964 yards. As a sophomore, he posted 3,241 yards. He had 6 touchdown passes against Pacific Lutheran University. As a junior, he registered 2,532 passing yards. He passed for 456 yards and 7 touchdowns against Pacific Lutheran University. As a senior, he started 14 games, tallying 4,616 passing yards (NAIA Division II record) on 364-of-576 completions (63.1%), 42 touchdowns and 14 interceptions, while leading the Wildcats to the NAIA Division II football national championship. He surpassed 300 passing yards in 8 contests. He had 455 passing yards and 4 touchdowns against Western Washington University. He passed for 454 yards against Whitworth University.

Kitna finished his college career with 43 games played, 911-of-1,550 completions (58.8%), 12,353 passing yards, 99 touchdowns and 59 interceptions. He set the NAIA record for career total offense with 12,907 yards. He had 17 games with over 300 passing yards.

In 2006, he was inducted into the Central Washington University Athletic Hall of Fame. In 2014, he was inducted into the Pacific Northwest Football Hall of Fame.

== Professional career ==
=== Seattle Seahawks ===
==== 1996 season ====
Believing that his football career was over after the NAIA championship, Kitna finished his math education degree at Central Washington and began applying for high-school coaching jobs. Seattle Seahawks head coach Dennis Erickson visited the campus to give a tryout for his nephew, Bryce Erickson, a receiver on the Central Washington team. Impressed by Kitna's strong passes, the Seahawks signed him as an undrafted free agent on April 25.

He was waived on August 19 and signed to the practice squad on August 26, where he remained for the rest of the season.

==== 1997 season ====
Kitna was allocated to the Barcelona Dragons of the World League of American Football. He appeared in 10 games, posting 171 completions (led the league), 317 pass attempts (led the league), a 53.9% average, 2,448 passing yards (led the league), 22 passing touchdowns (led the league), 15 interceptions. He set the league record for quarterbacks with 334 rushing yards and 3 rushing touchdowns.

He was the runner-up to T. J. Rubley for World League MVP honors and was named the MVP of the title game, when he led the Barcelona Dragons to a 38–24 World Bowl V win over the Rhein Fire, completing 23-of-31 passes for 401 yards (league record), 2 touchdowns and one interception.

He returned to the Seahawks and was the third-string quarterback behind John Friesz and Warren Moon. On December 14, he had his first career start against the Oakland Raiders after Moon injured his ribs, leading the team to the second biggest comeback in franchise history, from a 21–3 halftime deficit to a 22–21 win. Moon returned to start in the season finale against the San Francisco 49ers. Kitna played in 3 games, making 23-of-37 completions for 283 yards, one touchdown and 2 interceptions.

==== 1998 season ====
Kitna was the team's deactivated third-string quarterback in 10 of the first 11 games. He made the first start of the season and second of his career against the Tennessee Oilers and earned AFC Offensive Player of the Week honors, after passing for 298 yards, 2 touchdowns and one interception, while leading a fourth-quarter comeback for the deciding 48-yard field goal in a 20–18 win.

He completed 17-of-24 attempts in the next game against the New York Jets, for 278 yards, 2 touchdowns, 3 carries for 25 yards and 2 interceptions. He had a 70-yard touchdown pass to Joey Galloway in the first quarter and followed it 3 minutes later with a second 57-yard touchdown pass to Galloway. He also rushed three times for 25 yards at the Jets.

In the fifteenth game against the Indianapolis Colts, he rallied the team to score 17 fourth quarter points in a 27–23 win, making 16-of-29 completions for 177 yards, 1 touchdown and no interceptions. He ended the season by passing for 242 yards, one touchdown and one interception against the eventual Super Bowl champion Denver Broncos.

He was named the starting quarterback for the last 5 contests, leading the team to a 3–2 record. He finished with 98-of-172 completions (57.0%) for 1,177 yards, 7 touchdowns and 8 interceptions. Five of his 7 touchdown passes went to wide receiver Joey Galloway.

==== 1999 season ====
Kitna started 15 games for the Seahawks. He did not play in the second game against the Chicago Bears due to a sprained toe he suffered in the season opener against the Detroit Lions. He was named the AFC Offensive Player of the Month for October, after guiding the club to a 3–1 record, while throwing for 7 touchdowns and just 2 interceptions.

He led the team to a 9–7 record (Kitna going 8–7 in games started), winning the AFC West and into the playoffs for the first time since 1988. Seattle would end up losing 20–17 in the wild card game against the Miami Dolphins. He posted 270-of-495 completions (54.5%) for 3,346 yards (fifth in the AFC), 23 touchdown passes (third in the AFC) and 16 interceptions.

==== 2000 season ====
In 2000, Seahawks head coach Mike Holmgren was concerned with Kitna's preseason performance and tried to work a trade for Green Bay Packers backup quarterback Matt Hasselbeck, although it did not come through.

Kitna began the season with a four-interception performance against the Miami Dolphins, which opened the door for Holmgren to put second-year quarterback Brock Huard in the game. Kitna started the next 4 contests, before being replaced by Huard in the sixth game against the Carolina Panthers. Huard suffered a concussion two games later in the second quarter against the Oakland Raiders, which forced him to miss 3 games and put Kitna back in the starter role.

On November 5, down 15–14 on 3rd-and-16 with 1:28 left in the game, Kitna dodged a possible 17-yard sack by San Diego Chargers defensive end Neil Smith and made an 18-yard pass to Darrell Jackson. This pass set up the game-winning field goal by Rian Lindell.

Huard returned as the starter in the thirteenth game against the Denver Broncos, but suffered a season-ending kidney injury in the first quarter. Kitna went on to start the last 4 contests. His last win for the Seahawks came on a rain-soaked Husky Stadium turf in December of that year, beating the AFC Championship Game-bound Oakland Raiders on a touchdown pass to rookie Darrell Jackson in the final minute of play.

The Seahawks were 6–6 in his 12 starts and 0–4 in the other games. He registered 259-of-418 completions (54.5%) for 2,658 yards, 18 touchdowns and 19 interceptions. Holmgren chose not to re-sign Kitna after the season.

=== Cincinnati Bengals ===
==== 2001 season ====
On March 8, he signed as an unrestricted free agent with the Cincinnati Bengals. He won the starting quarterback job in preseason over Scott Mitchell and went on to start 15 games. He opened the regular season winning his first 2 starts, becoming the first Bengals quarterback since Greg Cook in 1969 to accomplish the feat.

In the sixteenth game overtime 26–23 win against the Pittsburgh Steelers, he threw for a franchise-record 68 passes, tied for the third most in NFL history. He had 35 completions for 411 yards, 2 touchdowns and received AFC Offensive Player of the Week honors.

In the season finale against the Tennessee Titans, he had 340 passing yards, setting a team record for passing yards in consecutive games with 751. He finished with 313 completions, 581 attempts (team record), a 53.9% average, 3,216 passing yards, 12 touchdowns and 22 interceptions.

==== 2002 season ====
Although he was the backup quarterback behind Gus Frerotte for the first 4 games, Kitna started the final 12 contests to help fix a struggling offense. He had 11 games (combined rushing and passing) of 300-or-more yards as well as six straight 350-yard games (Games 7–12), the franchise's longest such streak since 1986.

In the eighth game against the Houston Texans, he had 22-of-27 completions (81.5%) for 263 yards and 4 touchdowns. In the fifteenth game against the New Orleans Saints, he led the offense on a pair of fourth-quarter touchdown drives to overcome a 7–13 deficit and get a 20–13 win. In the season, he collected 294-of-473 completions (62.2%) for 3,178 yards, 16 touchdowns, 16 interceptions, 24 carries for 57 yards and 4 rushing touchdowns.

==== 2003 season ====
Kitna played every offensive down and became the first player in franchise history to throw every one of the team's passes in a single-season. He threw 137 straight passes with no interceptions. In the twelfth game 34–27 win against the San Diego Chargers, he tied his career high with four touchdown passes. In the thirteenth game against the Pittsburgh Steelers, he led a 24–20 comeback win, making a game-winning 18-yard touchdown pass with 13 seconds remaining.

He was named the NFL Comeback Player of the Year after throwing for over 3,500 yards and 26 touchdown passes (second in the AFC) in leading the Bengals to an 8–8 record, the team's first non-losing season since 1996.

==== 2004 season ====
Kitna's secondary role with the team was to prepare young quarterback Carson Palmer (the Bengals' #1 draft pick in 2003). It was a role Kitna accepted gracefully. The two quarterbacks developed a close friendship off the field, particularly because both men are avid golfers.

By 2004, Palmer was ready to take over the starting job, leading the Bengals to another 8–8 season. Kitna was the backup quarterback until seeing his first action of the season in the thirteenth game against the New England Patriots, due to a season-ending knee injury to Palmer. He made 9-of-13 completions for 126 yards and one touchdown in a 28–35 loss.

In his first start of the season against the Buffalo Bills, he made 16-of-32 completions for 151 yards and one touchdown. He led the team to a 23–22 win against the New York Giants, throwing a four-yard touchdown pass with 0:44 remaining, while also completing 20-of-32 passes for 186 yards, 2 touchdowns and one interception. In the season finale against the Philadelphia Eagles, he completed 16-of-27 passes for 160 yards and one touchdown, winning 38–10 against the eventual NFC champions.

==== 2005 season ====
Kitna entered his first game of the season during the fourth quarter against the Detroit Lions and led the offense on a field goal drive. He played in the final offensive series against the Buffalo Bills and went 2-of-2 for 17 yards. He replaced Palmer in the second quarter of the season finale against the Kansas City Chiefs, completing 13-of-24 passes for 76 yards and 2 interceptions in a 37–3 loss.

He was unexpectedly thrust back behind center during the Bengals' AFC Wild Card Playoff game against the Pittsburgh Steelers on January 8, 2006. Palmer went down with a left knee injury on his second play from scrimmage and Kitna stepped in off the bench and into a relief role. Kitna finished 24-of-40 for 197 yards, one touchdown and 2 interceptions and one fumble as the Bengals fell to the eventual Super Bowl XL champion Pittsburgh Steelers 31–17.

=== Detroit Lions ===
==== 2006 season ====
On March 14, he signed with the Detroit Lions as an unrestricted free agent, to compete with Josh McCown for the quarterback position. Kitna was named the starter and became the first quarterback in franchise history to take every snap in a single-season.

He registered 372 completions (franchise record), 596 attempts (franchise record), 62.4 pass completion rate (second in franchise history), 4,208 passing yards (second in franchise history), 21 touchdowns (fourth in franchise history) and 22 interceptions. He also became the second quarterback in franchise history after Scott Mitchell, to pass for 4,000 yards in one season. His four 300-yard passing games were the fourth-most in the NFL.

==== 2007 season ====
The Lions offense was ranked ninth in the league in passing, with Kitna starting all 16 games, while throwing for 4,068 yards, 18 touchdowns and 20 interceptions. He set a single-game franchise record and a personal career-high with 442 passing yards against the Philadelphia Eagles. He became the first quarterback in franchise history with back-to-back 4,000-yard seasons.

==== 2008 season ====
Kitna suffered a back injury in the fourth game of the season and was placed on the injured reserve list on October 14. The Lions became the first NFL team to finish a season with no wins and 16 losses.

He passed Charlie Batch for the eighth place on Detroit's all-time passing list with 9,034 yards. He finished with 68-of-120 (56.7%) for 758 yards and 5 touchdowns.

On February 28, 2009, he was traded to the Dallas Cowboys in exchange for cornerback Anthony Henry.

=== Dallas Cowboys ===
In 2009, the Cowboys acquired Kitna to improve their backup quarterback situation, after Brad Johnson had a 1–2 record, including a 35–14 loss against the New York Giants when Tony Romo was injured during the previous season. Kitna did not play a single down for the Cowboys in the regular season.

In 2010, Kitna remained idle until October 25, when Romo suffered a broken clavicle against the New York Giants and was later placed on the injured reserve list on December 21. Kitna ended up suffering an abdominal injury against the Arizona Cardinals on Christmas Day, and was replaced with second-year quarterback Stephen McGee for the rest of the season. Kitna played well in relief of Romo throwing for 2,365 yards, 16 touchdowns and 12 interceptions in the 9 games he started, compiling a 4–5 record and a career-high 88.9 passer rating in the process.

In 2011, he suffered a herniated disk problem in training camp that limited him to only 3 games. In his last action, he took the last snap on a 44–7 victory over the Buffalo Bills on November 13. He couldn't play the rest of the season because his back condition never improved. He was placed on the injured reserve list on December 14. McGee was promoted to backup quarterback in his place. The injury forced him to announce his retirement from the NFL on January 12, 2012.

On Christmas Eve, 2013, Kitna was called out of retirement to serve as an emergency back-up behind quarterback Kyle Orton, for the season finale against the Philadelphia Eagles, following a back injury to Romo. He donated his game salary ($55,294 before taxes) to the Lincoln High School Booster Club.

== NFL career statistics ==
Legend
	Led the league
**Bold**	Career high

=== Regular season ===
Year	Team	Games			Passing									Rushing					Sacks		Fumbles	
Year	Team	GP	GS	Record	Cmp	Att	Pct	Yds	Avg	Lng	TD	Int	Rtg	Att	Yds	Avg	Lng	TD	Sck	SckY	Fum	Lost
1997	SEA	3	1	1–0	31	45	**68.9**	371	8.2	61	1	2	82.7	10	9	0.9	8	1	3	10	1	0
1998	SEA	6	5	3–2	98	172	57.0	1,177	6.8	70	7	8	72.3	20	67	3.4	21	1	11	72	6	1
1999	SEA	15	15	**8–7**	270	495	54.5	3,346	6.8	51	23	16	77.7	35	56	1.6	10	0	32	198	14	5
2000	SEA	15	12	6–6	259	418	62.0	2,658	6.4	71	18	19	75.6	**48**	127	2.6	13	1	33	166	**17**	7
2001	CIN	**16**	15	6–9	313	581	53.9	3,216	5.5	49	12	**22**	61.1	27	73	2.7	20	1	25	185	13	4
2002	CIN	14	12	2–10	294	473	62.2	3,178	6.7	72	16	16	79.1	24	57	2.4	12	**4**	24	159	10	6
2003	CIN	**16**	**16**	8–8	324	520	62.3	3,591	6.9	82	**26**	15	87.4	38	113	3.0	15	0	37	249	9	4
2004	CIN	4	3	2–1	61	104	58.7	623	6.0	30	5	4	75.9	10	42	4.2	15	0	6	41	2	1
2005	CIN	3	0	–	17	29	58.6	99	3.4	16	0	2	36.4	2	14	**7.0**	11	0	2	10	0	0
2006	DET	**16**	**16**	3–13	**372**	**596**	62.4	**4,208**	7.1	60	21	**22**	79.9	34	**156**	4.6	18	2	**63**	**388**	11	9
2007	DET	**16**	**16**	7–9	355	561	63.3	4,068	7.3	**91**	18	20	80.9	25	63	2.5	11	0	51	320	**17**	6
2008	DET	4	4	0–4	68	120	56.7	758	6.3	47	5	5	72.2	6	34	5.7	10	0	15	89	3	1
2009	DAL	0	0	–	DNP																	
2010	DAL	10	9	4–5	209	318	65.7	2,365	7.4	71	16	12	**88.9**	31	147	4.7	**29**	1	21	100	7	1
2011	DAL	3	0	–	6	10	60.0	87	**8.7**	33	1	2	82.1	3	-2	-0.7	0	0	0	0	0	0
2013	DAL	0	0	–	DNP																	
Career		141	124	50–74	2,677	4,442	60.3	29,745	6.7	91	169	165	77.4	313	956	3.1	29	11	323	1,987	110	45

=== Postseason ===
Year	Team	Games			Passing									Rushing					Sacks		Fumbles	
Year	Team	GP	GS	Record	Cmp	Att	Pct	Yds	Avg	Lng	TD	Int	Rtg	Att	Yds	Avg	Lng	TD	Sck	SckY	Fum	Lost
1999	SEA	**1**	**1**	0-1	14	30	46.7	162	**5.4**	22	**1**	**2**	46.8	1	1	1.0	1	0	**6**	**32**	0	0
2005	CIN	**1**	0	–	**24**	**40**	**60.0**	**197**	4.9	**24**	**1**	**2**	**60.1**	**4**	**25**	**6.3**	**12**	0	4	20	**1**	0
2009	DAL	0	0	–	DNP																	
Career		2	1	0–1	38	70	54.3	359	5.1	24	2	4	54.4	5	26	5.2	12	0	10	52	1	0

== Coaching career ==
From 2012 to 2014, Kitna was a math teacher and head football coach at alma mater, Lincoln High School. As coach he led the team to a 5–5 record in the 2012 season. Lincoln improved to 8–2 in 2013 and 11–1 in 2014. Lincoln shared the Washington Interscholastic Activities Association (WIAA) District 3A Narrows regular season championship in 2013, with a 5–1 conference record tied with Lacey Timberline. In 2014, Lincoln went 7–0 in conference play and won the outright regular season championship.

In January 2015, he resigned from Lincoln and accepted the head coaching job at Waxahachie High School in Waxahachie, Texas, south of Dallas.

In February 2018, Kitna was hired at Brophy College Preparatory, an all-men Jesuit high school in Phoenix, Arizona. He guided the football team to a 7–4 record and a state appearance.

In June 2018, he was named the offensive coordinator for the San Diego Fleet of the Alliance of American Football, which began play in 2019. However, he did not coach a game for the Fleet as he joined the Dallas Cowboys staff in January to become their quarterbacks coach and work with Dak Prescott. In 2020, he was not retained by new Cowboys head coach Mike McCarthy.

In March 2020, Kitna was hired as the football head coach and athletic coordinator at Burleson High School in Burleson, Texas. He would coach there until the 2022 season.

In February 2023, Kitna was hired as the head football coach and dean of students at Lakota East High School in Liberty Township, Ohio.

=== Head coaching record ===
Team	Year	Overall					Postseason			
Team	Year	Won	Lost	Ties	Win %	Finish	Won	Lost	Win %	Result
Tacoma (WA) Lincoln	2012	5	6	0	.454	4th in WA 3A Narrows	0	1	.000	Lost to Bellevue (WA) in 3A First Round.
Tacoma (WA) Lincoln	2013	8	3	0	.727	T-1st in WA 3A Narrows	0	1	.000	Lost to Sammamish (WA) Eastside Catholic in 3A First Round.
Tacoma (WA) Lincoln	2014	11	1	0	.917	1st in WA 3A Narrows	2	1	.667	Lost to Sammamish (WA) Eastside Catholic in 3A Quarterfinals.
Tacoma (WA) Lincoln total		24	10	0	.705		2	3	.400	
Waxahachie (TX)	2015	6	4	0	.600	5th out of 8 in TX 5A Region II District 14	0	0	.000	Did not qualify.
Waxahachie (TX)	2016	6	4	0	.600	5th out of 8 in TX 5A Region II District 10	0	0	.000	Did not qualify.
Waxahachie (TX)	2017	8	5	0	.615	4th out of 8 in TX 5A Region II District 10	2	1	.667	Lost to Lone Star (Frisco, TX) in 5A-D2 Region II Regional Finals.
Waxahachie (TX) total		20	13	0	.606		2	1	.667	
Brophy College Preparatory (AZ)	2018	7	4	0	.636	3rd out of 5 in AZ 6A Premier Section	0	1	.000	Lost to Mountain Pointe (AZ) in Conference 6A First Round.
Brophy College Preparatory (AZ) total		7	4	0	.636		0	1	.000	
Burleson (TX)	2020	6	4	0	.600	2nd out of 4 in TX 5A-2 Region II District 5 Zone B	0	0	.000	Did not qualify.
Burleson (TX)	2021	8	4	0	.667	3rd out of 8 in TX 5A-2 Region II District 5	1	1	.500	Lost to Lovejoy (Lucas, TX) in 5A-D2 Region II Area Round
Burleson (TX)	2022	3	7	0	.300	5th out of 8 in TX 5A-2 Region II District 5	0	0	.000	Did not qualify.
Burleson (TX) total		17	15	0	.531		1	1	.500	
Lakota East (OH)	2023	1	9	0	.100	8th out of 8 in Greater Miami Conference	0	0	.000	Did not qualify.
Lakota East (OH)	2024	8	4	0	.615	4th out of 8 in Greater Miami Conference	1	1	.500	Lost to Moeller High School in Division 1 Second Round
Lakota East (OH)	2025	8	4	0	.667	3rd out of 8 in Greater Miami Conference	1	1	.500	Lost to St. Xavier High School in Division 1 Second Round
Lakota East (OH) total		17	18	0	.485		2	2	.500	
Career total		85	60	0	.586		7	8	.466	

== Personal life ==
Kitna became a Christian while attending Central Washington University. His parents, who had previously been non-religious, later became Christians as well. Kitna has four children with his wife. His son Jalen Kitna was a quarterback at Florida, but was dismissed from the team in December 2022 after being arrested on child pornography charges. The charges were later reduced to a misdemeanor after investigation, and he was able to re-enroll in classes. Jalen later played two seasons for the UAB Blazers. His other son, JT Kitna is a quarterback at Stephen F. Austin university, and previously played at Bowling Green.
