= Burleson Independent School District =

School district in Texas

Location
- Burleson, TX Region 11 USA

District information
- Type: Public
- Grades: Pre-K through 12
- Superintendent: Dr. Bret Jimerson
- Governing agency: Texas Education Agency
- NCES District ID: 4812180

Students and staff
- Students: 11,342
- Teachers: 906.8
- Staff: 1381.7

Other information
- Website: Burleson ISD

Burleson Independent School District is a public school district based in Burleson, Texas (USA). The district was founded in 1909 by the citizens of Burleson. In addition to Burleson, the district also serves Briaroaks, Cross Timber, Fort Worth, Rendon, and a small portion of Crowley. Most of Burleson ISD is in Johnson County, but a small portion is in Tarrant County.

In 2009, the school district was rated "academically acceptable" by the Texas Education Agency.

== Academics ==
STAAR - Percent at Level II Satisfactory Standard or Above (Sum of All Grades Tested)
Subject	Burleson ISD	Region 11	State of Texas
Reading	80%	76%	73%
Mathematics	81%	78%	76%
80%	77%		
All Tests	81%	77%	75%

Students in Burleson typically outperform local region and statewide averages on standardized tests. In 2015-2016 State of Texas Assessments of Academic Readiness (STAAR) results, 81% of students in Burleson ISD met Level II Satisfactory standards, compared with 77% in Region 11 and 75% in the state of Texas. The average SAT score of the class of 2015 was 1452, and the average ACT score was 22.1.

== Demographics ==
In the 2015–2016 school year, the school district had a total of 11,342 students, ranging from early childhood education and pre-kindergarten through grade 12. The class of 2015 included 752 graduates; the annual drop-out rate across grades 9-12 was less than 1%.

As of the 2015–2016 school year, the ethnic distribution of the school district was 68.9% White, 20.7% Hispanic, 5.6% African American, 1.0% Asian, 0.6% American Indian, 0.2% Pacific Islander, and 2.9% from two or more races. Economically disadvantaged students made up 36.9% of the student body.

== Schools ==
=== High Schools (Grades 9-12) ===
- Burleson High School
- Centennial High School
- Burleson Collegiate High School
- Crossroads High School
- GDDS Secondary School (6-12)

=== Middle Schools (Grades 6-8) ===
- Hughes Middle School
- Kerr Middle School
- STEAM Middle School of Choice
- GDDS Secondary School (6-12)

=== Elementary Schools (Grades PK-5) ===
- Academy at Nola Dunn
- Academy of the Arts at Bransom
- Academy of Leadership and Technology at Mound Elementary School
- Ann Brock Elementary School
- Irene Clinkscale Elementary School
- Frazier Elementary School
- Judy Hajek Elementary School
- JW Norwood Elementary School
- Jack Taylor Elementary School
- STEAM Academy at Stribling Elementary
