= Cross Timber, Texas =

- Town
- Location in Johnson County and the state of Texas
- Coordinates: 32°28′58″N 97°19′36″W
- Country: United States
- State: Texas
- County: Johnson

Area
  - Total: 1.41 sq mi (3.65 km^{2})
  - Land: 1.41 sq mi (3.65 km^{2})
  - Water: 0 sq mi (0.00 km^{2})
- Elevation: 810 ft (250 m)

Population (2020)
  - Total: 362
  - Density: 257/sq mi (99.2/km^{2})
- Time zone: UTC-6 (Central (CST))
  - Summer (DST): UTC-5 (CDT)
- ZIP Code: 76028
- FIPS code: 48-17917
- GNIS feature ID: 2412392
- Website: crosstimbertx.com

Cross Timber is a town in Johnson County, Texas, United States. As of the 2020 census, the population was 362.

== Geography ==
Cross Timber is located in northern Johnson County, 4 miles (6 km) south of the center of Burleson, 12 miles (19 km) north of Cleburne, the Johnson county seat, and 20 miles (32 km) south of downtown Fort Worth. According to the United States Census Bureau, the town has a total area of 1.41 square miles (3.65 km^{2}), all land.

== Demographics ==
Historical population
Census	Pop.	Note	%±
2000	277		—
2010	268		−3.2%
2020	362		35.1%
U.S. Decennial Census; 2020 Census

At the 2000 census, there were 277 people, 108 households and 85 families residing in the town. The population density was 200.5 inhabitants per square mile (77.4/km^{2}). There were 115 housing units at an average density of 83.2 per square mile (32.1/km^{2}). The racial makeup of the town was 89.89% White, 0.36% African American, 2.17% Native American, 0.72% Asian, 2.53% from other races, and 4.33% from two or more races. Hispanic or Latino of any race were 6.86% of the population. By the 2020 census, its population was 362.

In 2000, there were 108 households, of which 29.6% had children under 18 living with them, 68.5% were married couples living together, 7.4% had a female householder with no husband present, and 20.4% were non-families. 18.5% of all households comprised individuals, and 7.4% had someone 65 years or older living alone. The average household size was 2.56, and the average family size was 2.79. Age distribution was 23.5% under 18, 6.5% from 18 to 24, 26.4% from 25 to 44, 35.0% from 45 to 64, and 8.7% who were 65 years or older. The median age was 41 years. For every 100 females, there were 88.4 males. For every 100 females age 18 and over, there were 91.0 males.

The median household income was $47,083, and the median family income was $51,500 at the 2000 census. Males had a median income of $47,083 versus $25,833 for females. The per capita income for the town was $23,259. About 3.2% of families and 4.2% of the population were below the poverty line, including 10.2% of those under eighteen and none of those 65 or over. In 2020, its median household income was $46,250.

== Education ==
The Burleson and Joshua Independent School Districts serve Cross Timber.
