= Mound Elementary School =

Mound Elementary School may refer to:

- Mound Elementary School in Ventura Unified School District, California
- Mound Elementary School in Miamisburg, Ohio
- Mound Elementary School in Burleson Independent School District, Texas
