= Briaroaks, Texas =

- City
- Interactive map of Briaroaks, Texas
- Coordinates: 32°30′02″N 97°18′17″W
- Country: United States
- State: Texas
- County: Johnson

Area
  - Total: 1.07 sq mi (2.77 km^{2})
  - Land: 1.07 sq mi (2.77 km^{2})
  - Water: 0 sq mi (0.00 km^{2})
- Elevation: 781 ft (238 m)

Population (2020)
  - Total: 507
  - Density: 474/sq mi (183/km^{2})
- Time zone: UTC-6 (Central (CST))
  - Summer (DST): UTC-5 (CDT)
- ZIP Code: 76028
- Area codes: 817, 682
- FIPS code: 48-10216
- GNIS feature ID: 2409904
- Website: briaroakstx.com

Briaroaks is a city in Johnson County, Texas, United States. The population was 507 at the 2020 census.

== Geography ==
Briaroaks is located in northern Johnson County. It is bordered to the northeast by Burleson. Downtown Fort Worth is 18 miles (29 km) north of Briaroaks. According to the U.S. Census Bureau, the city has a total area of 1.1 square miles (2.8 km^{2}), all land.

== Demographics ==
Historical population
Census	Pop.	Note	%±
1980	592		—
1990	535		−9.6%
2000	493		−7.9%
2010	492		−0.2%
2020	507		3.0%
U.S. Decennial Census; 2020 Census

=== 2020 census ===
As of the 2020 census, Briaroaks had a population of 507. The median age was 52.4 years. 16.6% of residents were under the age of 18 and 29.4% of residents were 65 years of age or older. For every 100 females there were 92.8 males, and for every 100 females age 18 and over there were 90.5 males age 18 and over.

85.2% of residents lived in urban areas, while 14.8% lived in rural areas.

There were 198 households in Briaroaks, of which 25.3% had children under the age of 18 living in them. Of all households, 68.2% were married-couple households, 13.6% were households with a male householder and no spouse or partner present, and 17.2% were households with a female householder and no spouse or partner present. About 16.2% of all households were made up of individuals and 11.7% had someone living alone who was 65 years of age or older.

There were 205 housing units, of which 3.4% were vacant. Among occupied housing units, 95.5% were owner-occupied and 4.5% were renter-occupied. The homeowner vacancy rate was <0.1% and the rental vacancy rate was 21.4%.

Racial composition as of the 2020 census
Race	Percent
White	89.5%
Black or African American	1.2%
American Indian and Alaska Native	0.6%
Asian	0.6%
Native Hawaiian and Other Pacific Islander	0.2%
Some other race	1.6%
Two or more races	6.3%
Hispanic or Latino (of any race)	8.1%

=== 2000 census ===
In 2000, there were 493 people, 180 households, and 160 families residing in the city. The population density was 477.5 inhabitants per square mile (184.4/km^{2}). There were 181 housing units at an average density of 175.3 per square mile (67.7/km^{2}). The racial makeup of the city was 98.58% White, 1.01% from other races, and 0.41% from two or more races. Hispanic or Latino of any race were 2.64% of the population.

In 2000, there were 180 households, out of which 28.3% had children under the age of 18 living with them, 81.1% were married couples living together, 5.0% had a female householder with no husband present, and 10.6% were non-families; 8.3% of all households were made up of individuals, and 5.0% had someone living alone who was 65 years of age or older. The average household size was 2.74 and the average family size was 2.89. In the city, the population was spread out, with 22.1% under the age of 18, 5.1% from 18 to 24, 22.1% from 25 to 44, 35.5% from 45 to 64, and 15.2% who were 65 years of age or older. The median age was 45 years. For every 100 females, there were 98.0 males. For every 100 females age 18 and over, there were 100.0 males.

In 2000, the median income for a household in the city was $60,938, and the median income for a family was $65,250. Males had a median income of $51,875 versus $30,750 for females. The per capita income for the city was $23,968. About 6.2% of families and 7.4% of the population were below the poverty line, including 10.2% of those under age 18 and 2.4% of those age 65 or over.

== Education ==
Briaroaks is served by the Burleson Independent School District.

== Climate ==
The climate in this area is characterized by hot, humid summers and generally mild to cool winters. According to the Köppen Climate Classification system, Briaroaks has a humid subtropical climate, abbreviated "Cfa" on climate maps.
