= Joshua High School =

Location
- 909 S Broadway Street; Joshua, Texas 76058; United States; 32.4504°N 97.3830°W

Information
- Established: 1907
- School district: Joshua Independent School District
- Principal: Celeste Neal
- Teaching staff: 94.18 (on an FTE basis)
- Grades: 9-12
- Enrollment: 1,313 (2024–2025)
- Student to teacher ratio: 13.94
- Colors: Blue and white
- Mascot: Owl
- Website: jhs.joshuaisd.org

Joshua High School is a public high school located in the city of Joshua, Texas, United States. It is in the Joshua Independent School District.

== History ==
The school was opened in 1907. The centenary was celebrated in 2007.

== Sports ==
The Joshua Fighting Owls play their home games at Owl Stadium, located behind the school.
