= Farm to Market Road 1187 =

Road in Texas, United States

Farm to Market Road 1187

Route information
- Maintained by TxDOT
- Length: 34.401 mi (Note: The certified mileage given is shorter than the actual mileage as TxDOT considers FM 1187 to be discontinuous at rather than concurrent with US 377.) (55.363 km)
- Existed: 1949–present

Major junctions
- West end: I-20 / FM 3325 near Aledo
- US 377 near Benbrook; Chisholm Trail Parkway near Crowley; I-35W in Fort Worth
- East end: Bus. US 287 in Mansfield

Location
- Country: United States
- State: Texas
- Counties: Parker, Tarrant

Highway system
- Highways in Texas; Interstate; US; State; Former; Toll; Loops; Spurs; FM/RM; Park; Rec
← FM 1186	→ FM 1188

Farm to Market Road 1187 (FM 1187) is a farm-to-market road located in the Dallas–Fort Worth metroplex of the U.S. state of Texas.

== Route description ==
FM 1187 begins at Interstate 20 (I-20) west of Fort Worth, north of Aledo. The highway runs south to Aledo, where it intersects FM 5. Here, FM 1187 turns to the east. The highway turns back to the south and has a short overlap with U.S. Route 377 (US 377) near Benbrook Lake in the unincorporated community of Wheatland. The highway runs to the south of the central business district of Crowley before intersecting I-35W in southern Fort Worth. FM 1187 runs through Rendon before ending at US 287 Business in Mansfield, then becoming Debbie Lane.

== History ==
FM 1187 was designated on July 14, 1949 from US 81 east 5.1 miles (8.2 km) to Rendon. On May 23, 1951, FM 1187 was extended east 5.4 miles (8.7 km) to US 287 (now Business US 287). On October 29, 1953, FM 1187 was extended west 6.4 miles (10.3 km) to a county road. On October 25, 1954, the section of FM 1187 west of FM 731 was transferred to FM 731. On November 22, 1955, FM 1187 was extended west to FM 1902, replacing the section of FM 731 from FM 1187 to FM 1902. On November 24, 1959, FM 1187 was extended northwest to US 377. On December 20, 1984, FM 2376 from US 377 to FM 5 and the section of FM 5 from what was FM 2376 to US 80 were transferred to FM 1187.

On June 27, 1995, the section of FM 1187 from US 377 to Business US 287 was redesignated Urban Road 1187 (UR 1187). The designation of this segment reverted to FM 1187 with the elimination of the Urban Road system on November 15, 2018.

== Major intersections ==
County	Location	mi	km	Destinations	Notes
Parker		0.0	0.0	I-20 / FM 3325 north – Weatherford, Fort Worth	I-20 exit 420; continues north as FM 3325
Parker	Aledo	3.2	5.1	FM 5 north – Annetta	
Tarrant		10.4	16.7	US 377 north – Benbrook, Fort Worth	West end of US 377 overlap
Tarrant		10.9	17.5	US 377 south – Granbury	East end of US 377 overlap
Tarrant		18.3	29.5	Chisholm Trail Parkway – Fort Worth, Cleburne	Interchange opened early 2014
Tarrant	Crowley	21.4	34.4	FM Bus. 1187 east – Crowley	
Tarrant	Crowley	23.1	37.2	FM 731 (Crowley Road)	
Tarrant	Crowley	24.3	39.1	FM Bus. 1187 west – Crowley	
Tarrant	Fort Worth	25.1	40.4	I-35W (South Freeway) – Fort Worth, Waco	I-35W exit 39
Tarrant	Mansfield	34.9	56.2	Bus. US 287 (Main Street) / Debbie Lane	Continues east as Debbie Lane
1.000 mi = 1.609 km; 1.000 km = 0.621 mi: Concurrency terminus

== Crowley business loop ==
Business Farm to Market Road 1187-C
- Location: Crowley
- Length: 3.458 mi (5.565 km)
- Existed: 2004–2016

Business Farm to Market Road 1187-C (Bus. FM 1187-C) was a business loop of FM 1187 in Crowley, running along Main Street. The highway was designated on February 26, 2004, when FM 1187 was rerouted south of the city. On October 27, 2016, the business route was removed from the state highway system, with jurisdiction transferred to the city of Crowley.
