= Tayton Conerway =

American basketball player (born 2002)

No. 6 – Stockton Kings
- Position: Point guard
- League: NBA G League

Personal information
- Born: January 11, 2002 (age 24) Fort Worth, Texas, U.S.
- Listed height: 6 ft 3 in (1.91 m)
- Listed weight: 190 lb (86 kg)

Career information
- High school: Burleson Centennial (Burleson, Texas)
- College: Grayson (2020–2021); Ranger (2021–2023); Troy (2023–2025); Indiana (2025–2026)
- NBA draft: 2026: undrafted
- Playing career: 2026–present

Career history
- 2026–present: Stockton Kings

Career highlights
- Sun Belt Player of the Year (2025); First-team All-Sun Belt (2025); Sun Belt Sixth Man of the Year (2024)

Tayton Conerway (born January 11, 2002) is an American basketball player for the Stockton Kings of the NBA G League. He played college basketball for the Grayson Vikings, Ranger Rangers, Troy Trojans and Indiana Hoosiers.

== Career ==
Conerway attended Centennial High School in Burleson, Texas. He continued his basketball career, playing at Grayson College and then Ranger College. In his final season at Ranger, he averaged 15.7 points, 6.2 rebounds, 3.5 assists and 1.6 steals per game, being named as a first-team NJCAA All-American, before transferring to Troy University. In his first season with Troy, he was named the Sun Belt Sixth Man of the Year. As a senior, Conerway was named the Sun Belt Conference Player of the Year. Averaging 16.7 points in conference play, he became the first Troy player to be named conference player of the year since 2004. Following the season, Conerway transferred to Indiana.

== Career statistics ==
Legend
GP	Games played	GS	Games started	MPG	Minutes per game
FG%	Field goal percentage	3P%	3-point field goal percentage	FT%	Free throw percentage
RPG	Rebounds per game	APG	Assists per game	SPG	Steals per game
BPG	Blocks per game	PPG	Points per game	**Bold**	Career high

=== College ===
==== NCAA Division I ====
Year	Team	GP	GS	MPG	FG%	3P%	FT%	RPG	APG	SPG	BPG	PPG
2023–24	Troy	32	2	20.1	.475	**.329**	.709	2.8	2.5	2.1	.3	11.8
2024–25	Troy	**34**	**34**	**30.4**	.471	.270	.664	**4.6**	**4.8**	**2.9**	**.4**	**14.2**
2025–26	Indiana	29	19	21.3	**.561**	.290	**.737**	2.8	3.3	1.1	.2	9.5
Career		95	55	24.1	.492	.292	.700	3.4	3.6	2.1	.3	12.0

==== NJCAA ====
Year	Team	GP	GS	MPG	FG%	3P%	FT%	RPG	APG	SPG	BPG	PPG
2022–23	Ranger	35	4	9.3	.484	.344	.749	6.2	3.5	1.6	.7	15.7
