= Joshua Independent School District =

School district in Texas

Joshua Independent School District is a public school district based in Joshua, Texas, USA.

In addition to Joshua, the district covers a 76.68-square-mile (198.6 km^{2}) area in north central Johnson County that includes portions of Cleburne, Burleson, Cross Timber, and Crowley.

In 2009, the school district was rated "academically acceptable" by the Texas Education Agency.

== Schools ==
Ten campuses and centers are in the Joshua Independent School District. Six are located in Joshua, while the remaining four are in Burleson.

- Grades 10-12
  - Joshua High School (Joshua)
- Grade 9
  - Joshua High School Ninth Grade Center (Joshua)
- Grades 7-8
  - R.C. Loflin Middle School (Burleson)
  - Tom and Nita Nichols Middle School (Burleson)
- Grades PK-6
  - A.G. Elder Elementary School (Joshua)
  - Caddo Grove Elementary School (Burleson)
  - H.D. Staples Elementary School (Joshua)
  - North Joshua Elementary School (Burleson)
  - Plum Creek Elementary School (Joshua)
- Other campuses
  - Accelerated Learning Center (Joshua)
