= Kody Russey =

American football player (born 1998)

Profile
- Position: Lineman

Personal information
- Born: May 14, 1998 (age 28); Burleson, Texas, U.S.
- Listed height: 6 ft 2 in (1.88 m)
- Listed weight: 295 lb (134 kg)

Career information
- High school: Burleson (Burleson, Texas)
- College: Louisiana Tech (2016–2020); Houston (2021)
- NFL draft: 2022: undrafted

Career history
- New England Patriots (2022–2023)

Awards and highlights
- Second-team All-AAC (2021); First-team All-C-USA (2020); C-USA All-Freshman Team (2017)
- Stats at Pro Football Reference

Kody Ray Russey (born May 14, 1998) is an American football lineman. He played college football for the Louisiana Tech Bulldogs from 2016 to 2020 and then transferred to the Houston Cougars for 2021. He was signed by the Patriots as an undrafted free agent in 2022.

== College career ==
Russey was rated as a three-star recruit by 247Sports and signed with Louisiana Tech on February 3, 2016. He redshirted as a true freshman in 2016. In 2017, he played in all 13 games with 10 starts, being selected to the Conference USA all-freshman team. He started all 13 games in 2018 and was an All-Conference USA honorable mention. For the 2019 season, he once again started all 13 games and was All-Conference USA honorable mention. Russey started all 10 games in the 2020 season, shortened by COVID-19, and was selected all-conference and to the C-USA Football All-Academic Team. Following the season, he transferred to Houston. He played his last year there, starting all 14 games at center while being team captain, and made the All-American Athletic Conference Second-Team.

== Professional career ==
Pre-draft measurables
| Height | Weight | Arm length | Hand span | 40-yard dash | 10-yard split | 20-yard split | 20-yard shuttle | Three-cone drill | Vertical jump | Broad jump | Bench press |
|---|---|---|---|---|---|---|---|---|---|---|---|
| 6 ft 1 5/8 in (1.87 m) | 301 lb (137 kg) | 32 1/4 in (0.82 m) | 9 5/8 in (0.24 m) | 5.11 s | 1.75 s | 2.97 s | 4.52 s | 7.83 s | 30.0 in (0.76 m) | 9 ft 2 in (2.79 m) | 38 reps |
All values from Pro Day

Russey did not get invited to the 2022 NFL Scouting Combine, and went unselected in the 2022 NFL draft. Afterwards, he was signed by the New England Patriots as an undrafted free agent. He played in all of the Patriots' preseason games but did not start in any of them, and was released at the final roster cuts; Russey was subsequently re-signed to their practice squad. He was elevated to the active roster for their games against the New York Jets and Indianapolis Colts, on October 30 and November 6, respectively, but did not play in either. Russey was signed to the active roster on November 8, and remained there the rest of the season, but was inactive for each game.

On August 29, 2023, Russey was waived by the Patriots and re-signed to the practice squad. He was not among the team's players signed to reserve/future contracts in 2024, and thus became a free agent at the expiration of his practice squad contract.
