= Jalen Kitna =

American football player (born 2003)

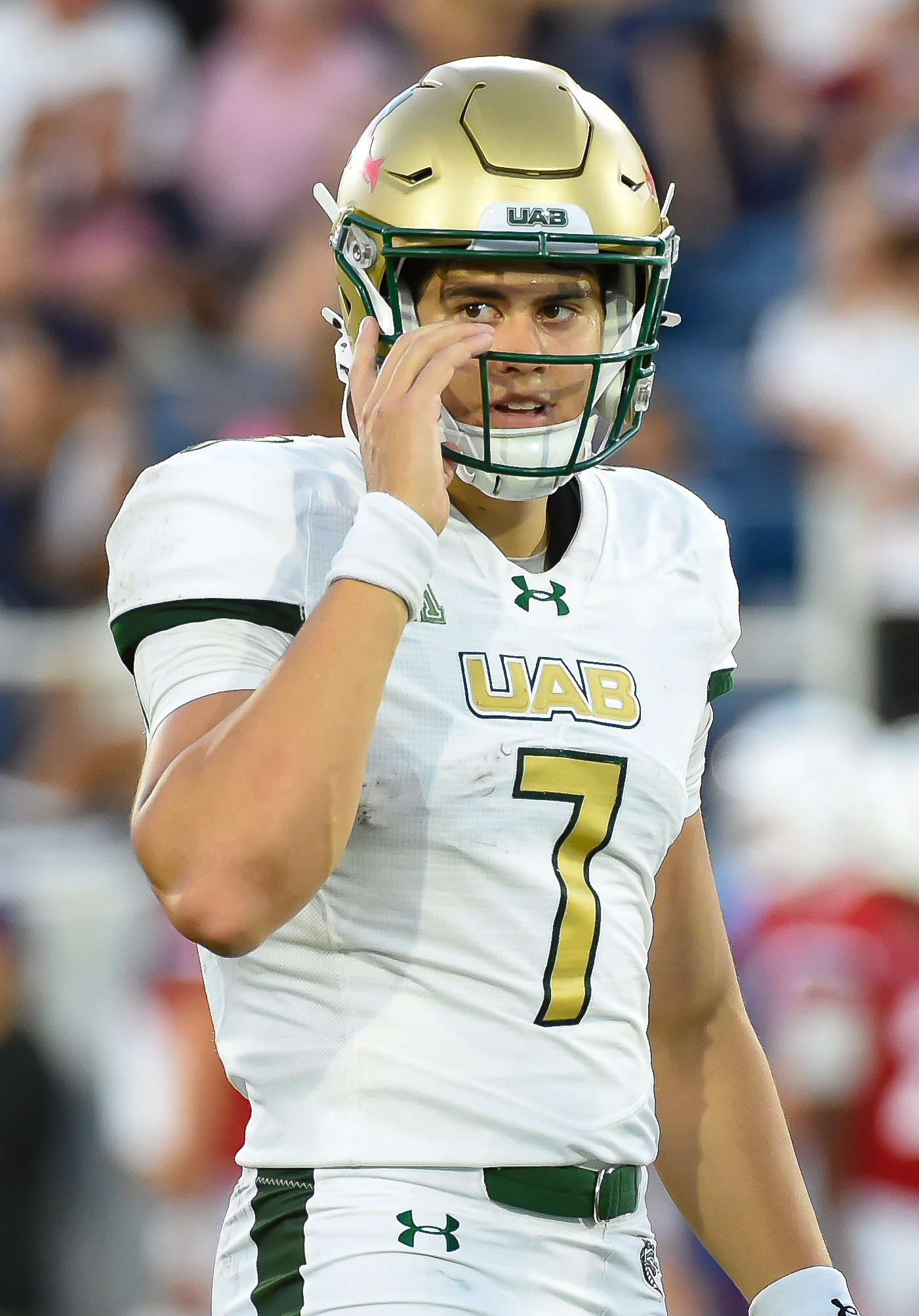
- Kitna with UAB in 2025

Profile
- Position: Quarterback

Personal information
- Born: March 22, 2003 (age 23)
- Listed height: 6 ft 4 in (1.93 m)
- Listed weight: 229 lb (104 kg)

Career information
- High school: Burleson (Burleson, Texas)
- College: Florida (2021–2022); UAB (2024–2025)
- NFL draft: 2026: undrafted
- Stats at ESPN

Jalen Kitna (born March 22, 2003) is an American football quarterback. He previously played for the Florida Gators and the UAB Blazers.

== Early life ==
Kitna is from Tacoma, Washington and attended Waxahachie High School in Waxahachie, Texas before transferring to Brophy College Preparatory in Phoenix, Arizona after his freshman year. He then transferred to Frisco High School in Frisco, Texas before finally transferring to Burleson High School in Burleson, Texas for his senior season and after his father was hired as the head football coach there. Kitna originally committed to Boston College before decommitting and switching his commitment to Florida.

== College career ==
Kitna began his college football career at Florida in 2021, using a redshirt in 2021, then playing four games in 2022. He was dismissed from Florida's roster in December 2022 following his arrest.

In December 2023, he committed to play for UAB. On November 2, 2024, he threw for 404 yards and six touchdowns against Tulsa, being named American Athletic Conference Offensive Player of the Week.

=== Statistics ===
Season	Team	Games			Passing								Rushing			
Season	Team	GP	GS	Record	Cmp	Att	Pct	Yds	Y/A	TD	Int	Rtg	Att	Yds	Avg	TD
2021	Florida	Redshirt (redshirt)														
2022	Florida	4	0	—	10	14	71.4	181	12.9	1	0	203.6	1	6	6.0	0
2024	UAB	8	8	2−6	196	316	62.0	2,209	7.0	17	11	131.5	45	-60	-1.3	0
2025	UAB	10	10	3−7	223	336	66.4	2,462	7.3	13	10	134.7	35	-40	-1.1	0
Career		22	18	5−13	429	666	64.4	4,852	7.3	31	21	134.7	81	-94	-1.2	0

== Professional career ==
Pre-draft measurables
Height	Weight	Arm length	Hand span	Wingspan
6 ft 4 3/8 in (1.94 m)	229 lb (104 kg)	33 1/2 in (0.85 m)	10 3/8 in (0.26 m)	6 ft 7 3/4 in (2.03 m)
All values from Pro Day

== Personal life ==
Kitna's father is former NFL quarterback Jon Kitna.

On November 30, 2022, Kitna was arrested on child pornography charges. In July 2023, the charges were dropped as part of a plea deal; Kitna pleaded no contest to two misdemeanor counts of breach of the peace. Kitna would go on to state that the initial charges were "not accurate" and a forensic investigation found no inappropriate material on any of his electronic devices.
