= My Life as Liz =

- Season one promotional photo
- Genre: Mockumentary; Comedy
- Created by: Jessica Antonini; Lindsey Bannister; Clayton Cogswell; Betty Park; Joseph Van Harken, Jr.
- Starring: Liz Lee; Taylor Terry; Collin Sullivan; Louis M Johnson
- Country of origin: United States
- Original language: English
- No. of seasons: 2
- No. of episodes: 21

Production
- Executive producers: Lindsey Bannister; Marshall Eisen; Dave Sirulnick; Joseph Van Harken, Jr.; Betty Park
- Producers: Jessica Antonini; Clayton Cogswell; Howie Miller; Jesse Paddock; Heather Walsh; Justin Zimmerman; Kevin Felix; Micah Weisberg; Rob Masterson
- Editors: Brian Murphy; Betty Park; Jon Philpot; David S. Tung
- Camera setup: Single-camera
- Running time: 20–22 minutes
- Production company: MTV Production Development

Original release
- Network: MTV
- Release: January 18, 2010 – May 3, 2011

My Life as Liz is a mockumentary-style American comedy television series that centers on the life of Liz Lee, a misfit high-school senior living in a small town in Texas. The series debuted on MTV on January 18, 2010.

The first-season finale aired on March 8, 2010. Filming for the second season began early 2010 in New York City, mostly at Pratt Institute, the college which series star Liz Lee attends. Season two premiered February 8, 2011, and consisted of 12 episodes. The series was not renewed for a third season, and the series finale aired on May 3, 2011.

== Genre ==
My Life as Liz uses the camera-work and editing typical of reality television. The show hints at Liz living in a small country-like town where her individuality is constantly threatened. The Texas city Liz lives in is a rapidly growing city of over 35,000 residents. The Los Angeles Times asserts that the show "is quasi-reality—real people, in their real environment, leading lives that are being in some way dramatized" and that the show "flirts with documentary but intersperses scenes of high-school hallway conversations". An MTV executive has stated, "We don't look at it as just a reality show. We weren't going to call it a sitcom, because it's not." Executive Producer Marshall Eisen stated, "The rule was, when Liz is around other people, we played that as straight as we could. When she's alone, that's when we were able to stylize things more." Liz herself has confirmed that there are multiple scenes that are "planned", citing the scene in "Liz's Got Talent (Part 1)", where Liz dresses as a superhero, and in "Summer of Suck", where Taylor Terry is shown in front of a black screen, but the events and relationships are true. The series frequently uses music from Faded Paper Figures, both for its end credits and during various episodes.

== Series overview ==
Season one focused on the life of Liz Lee. She lives in Burleson, Texas, a conservative, religious suburb in the Dallas-Fort Worth metroplex; she is extremely proud to be a geek and is happy to have her friends. The show also focuses on Liz's main antagonist, Cori Cooper and her minions Taylor Terry and Tori Langley, and all of Liz's friends, such as Bryson Gilreath (who is also her love interest), Colin "Sully" Sullivan, Miles Reed, and Troy Yingst. Season one shows Liz's journey through her senior year in high school, and her struggles with her enemy Cori Cooper. Season two is set in New York, with Liz adjusting to old and new friends.

== Cast ==
Elizabeth "Liz" Lee: The show's main character, is a girl from Burleson, Texas. She is a self-proclaimed individualist and geek. She feels that in her town people are either stuck-up or narrow-minded. She admits she used to be a typical "preppy girl", until Cori Cooper betrayed her in high school. She enjoys reading comic books and is obsessed with Star Wars. Season one covers how she deals with high-school drama, sometimes with Cori involved. In "My Secret Valentine", she begins to develop a crush on her friend, Bryson, even though he has a girlfriend at the time. Their friendship gradually gets stronger as he gives Liz support during her high school talent show, even playing guitar alongside Liz to make her less nervous when performing. Despite their friendship, Bryson rejects her offer to go to the prom and makes Liz want to forget. In the season one finale, however, Bryson finally confesses his feelings to Liz. After high school, she moves to New York to attend Pratt Institute. However, she meets very few people and has trouble juggling her long-distance relationship with Bryson. It is in New York where she meets Louis, a possible boyfriend after Bryson is dishonest with her in "The Morning After".

Colin "Sully" Sullivan: Liz's sidekick and best friend. He takes pride in his comic book collection and is always there for Liz. He is a huge supporter for her, especially when she auditions for her school talent show by making T-shirts in support for Liz. It's revealed in "The ABC's of Friendship" that he secretly likes Liz but will not take the chance of asking her out; he fears it might jeopardize their great friendship. During high school prom, Liz invites Sully to come with him after being rejected by her love interest, Bryson. In "A Prom to Remember (Part 2)", Sully shows that he wants to get Liz and Bryson together by distracting Bryson's date in order for them to have alone time. In season two, Sully remains loyal to Liz and her relationship with Bryson. He gets extremely protective of Liz when he meets Louis for the first time in "The New Morning". During his visit in New York, he meets a girl named Marlene, who shares his love of comics and inevitably develops a crush on her. In the season two finale, Sully returns to New York finally admits his love for Liz in order for him to move on towards Marlene. However, Sully fails when Marlene "pulls the friend card."

Bryson Gilreath: Liz's crush during season one; however, he has a girlfriend. They almost kiss at the end of season one, but their friends awkwardly cheer before the kiss. In season two, Bryson surprises Liz in New York and they finally kiss, however, Liz finds out that Bryson supposedly has a girlfriend back home in Austin. He is supposed to love her but it seems like he does since he leaves school for the weekend and spends it with her. Afterward, Bryson desperately tries to contact her, but Liz continues to ignore him. Once he finds out that she is dating Louis, he gets jealous, and due to Sully exposing his feelings about Liz, he admits to Liz that he does in fact love her in the season two finale.

Taylor Terri: A past sidekick for Cori Cooper, Liz's antagonist. At first, Liz doesn't trust her because of Taylor befriending Liz in the summer but ignoring her while in school. However, throughout Liz's senior year at Burleson High, she and Taylor slowly become good friends; for example, when she stands up for Liz against Cori Cooper at her ABC party. While helping Liz to be with Bryson, Taylor also befriends Sully and the rest of the gang, and is seen during season two frequently hanging out with the group while Liz is in New York. In season two, it was revealed that Taylor has decided to go to college in New York as well.

Cori Cooper (season 1, guest season 2): Known as the "Queen of Mean", Cori is very self-absorbed and hates "anyone who has an original thought". She is the most popular girl in school, because she's the prettiest. She is also a member of the "blonde squad", which consists of her, Taylor, and Tori. She will do whatever it takes to get what she wants, and no one can stand in her way. She always looks for ways to get back at Liz, her nemesis. Cori does suffer a few personal defeats in the series, such as when she verbally attacks Liz at a party being given by Taylor, who stood up for her against Cori's insults. Cori then demands that she choose between her and Liz. Taylor, finally having had enough of Cori's hateful behavior, chooses Liz. Later in the season during the "A Prom to Remember (Part 2)" episode, Liz had a mini-meltdown right before the school announced the prom queen, which was awarded to someone else. Cori then had a meltdown and went to the bathroom with her other friend, crying about how she feels and how she thinks everyone in the school hates her, and now realizes that her shallow, stuck-up, and vindictive ways have finally led to her downfall. It was revealed in season two that she had a baby.

Louis M Johnson (season 2): An aspiring musician in a two-man band, Louis meets Liz in the season two premiere while she was dumpster diving for art project materials. At first, she considered him a sign of moving on from Bryson, until Bryson visits her in New York. After learning of Bryson's girlfriend in Texas, Louis is the one who cheers her up. He continues to flirt with Liz while she searches for an apartment and even lets her move in with him temporarily. When Louis finally gets the chance to go out with her, he ends up meeting Sully and the gang, who are skeptical of him at first and make it their priority to make sure he won't hurt Liz. Liz actually offers to sing with Louis at a 1980s gig, where they share their first kiss after their performance. In the season two finale, Liz and Louis decide to put their relationship on hold while he goes on tour with his band Augustine.

== Episodes ==
Season	Episodes	Originally released	
Season	Episodes	First released	Last released
1	9	January 18, 2010	March 8, 2010
2	12	February 8, 2011	May 3, 2011

=== Season 1 (2010) ===
No.	Title	Original release date	Prod. code	US viewers (millions)
1	"Summer of Suck"	January 18, 2010	101	0.902
Meet Liz, a senior in high school who considers herself as an outsider in her home in Texas. Liz's end-of-summer plans are ruined when she must spend time with the ever-bubbly Taylor Terry, who represents almost everything she hates about home.
2	"My Sketchy Valentine"	January 18, 2010	102	0.902 (Note: Note that the first two episodes originally aired on the same night. The number doesn't reflect the ratings of each episode individually.)
Liz receives flowers from a secret admirer and embarks on a mission to find out who sent them. The cards tell her to attend the Valentine's Day Dance to meet him. Unfortunately, no one shows up, leaving Liz in dismay. Later on, Bryson comes to cheer her up when she learns Cori sent the flowers to humiliate her.
3	"Liz's Got Talent? (Part 1)"	January 25, 2010	103	0.865
Liz auditions for the talent show to compete against Cori Cooper, but suddenly get nervous. She and Sully hold auditions to start a band with her, but no one shows up. Later, Bryson suggests helping Liz out with a solo performance. Thanks to his support, she makes the cut.
4	"Liz's Got Talent? (Part 2)"	February 1, 2010	104	0.882
Liz is sick and worried about the talent show as the pressure mounts. Sully takes a candid photo of Liz and creates shirts with her picture on it for all the Liz supporters to wear. As the talent show begins, Bryson leaves, but surprises her with a guitar and performs with Liz. When they announce the winner, it is not Liz. However, it is not Cori and her group either. Liz thanks Bryson and then meets Bryson's girlfriend at the end of the talent show. The episode ends with Liz putting a picture of her friends carrying her on their shoulders on her dresser and says "One small step for this nerd, one giant leap for nerd kind."
5	"Hunting for Change"	February 8, 2010	105	0.872
Taylor tags along when Liz and her family go on a hunting trip to do an article and video about animal cruelty and that it's inhumane. Taylor and Liz bond while on the trip, but their video is rejected. Liz is upset when Bryson decides to meet his girlfriend's family instead of going on the hunting trip.
6	"The ABCs of Friendship"	February 15, 2010	106	0.783
Taylor invites Liz to her ABC (Anything But Clothes) party. Cori is angry at this and, during the party, she verbally attacks Liz, telling her to go home. Taylor stops the fight and, after being told to pick between Cori and Liz, she picks Liz. Bryson goes to Liz's house after the party to tell her about his breakup with his girlfriend. Also, Sully decides he was finally going to tell Liz about his feeling towards her, but when he finally gets the guts to go to her house, he finds that Bryson is already there.
7	"A Prom to Remember (Part 1)"	February 22, 2010	107	1.134
Liz decides to go to the prom but doesn't have a date. Taylor encourages Liz to ask Bryson to the prom. Liz finds the courage to ask Bryson but when she does, Bryson tells her he is already going with his ex-girlfriend, Jami. Finally Liz asks Sully to go with her, and he gladly accepts.
8	"A Prom to Remember (Part 2)"	March 1, 2010	108	1.069
Liz goes to senior prom with Sully, but not before dumping every item she owns that is related to Bryson in a garbage can with help from Taylor. At prom, Liz tries to focus on Sully, but her eyes keep on wandering over to Bryson. Right before prom queen is announced, Liz has a minor meltdown and has to leave the room. Bryson sees her and follows. Liz quickly walks to the bathroom, where she encounters Cori. Later, Bryson corners Liz and apologizes for not going with her. Liz brushes him off. Sully and Liz decide to leave, and we see Taylor and Bryson talking about how Bryson needs to tell Liz his "true feelings". Bryson runs down the stairs to try and catch Liz and tell her, but she and Sully have already left. The final shot is of Liz and Sully in front of a burger joint, eating and talking.
9	"The End of the Beginning"	March 8, 2010	109	1.290
Liz considers moving to New York, and eventually decides to go. Her friends see her off, and Bryson arrives late, but finally is able to tell Liz his feelings. They almost kiss before their friends cheer, which embarrasses them both. Liz gets back in the car and leaves, for which her friends get confused.

=== Season 2 (2011) ===
No.	Title	Original release date	Prod. code	US viewers (millions)
1	"Empire State of Mind"	February 8, 2011	201	1.73
Liz has been transplanted fifteen hundred miles away from Texas to New York City. While moving to New York has always been a dream of Liz's, actually living there has become a little bit of a nightmare. Liz makes it in New York, alive. She goes on looking for her art project in the dumpster. While she is dumpster diving she meets a musician named Louis, a cute musician. Meanwhile, back in Texas, Sully and the gang plan to travel to Austin, Texas and talk to Bryson about their concerns for Liz. They discover Bryson has gone to New York on his own, for an unknown reason. Liz then begins to worry about their relationship, since Bryson hasn't called or told her anything about it. While she's in the club, in a concert, she leaves and finds Louis again. She and Louis eat some pizza as she shares her concerns about long-distance relationships with Louis. As Liz heads home thinking Louis could be a sign to move on with her life, she finds Bryson waiting to surprise her.
2	"Lost and Found in New York"	February 15, 2011	202	2.0
Liz gets a surprise visit from Bryson, where he reveals he is in New York for an interview for a summer internship as well as visiting Liz. She wants to show him the New York she isn't living and, when he finds out, things don't go as well as he had hoped. However, after being honest with Bryson about her lonely life in New York, things take a turn for the better and they have a wonderful day together and a romantic evening. Meanwhile, Sully and the gang stay in Austin to tour the college and attend its parties. Despite Troy's efforts, Sully still shows concern for Liz, hinting that he still has a crush on her. At the end of the party, Sully leaves with a girl's phone number.
3	"The Morning After"	February 22, 2011	203	1.7
After a romantic night with Bryson, Liz finishes her "found art" project for school. Waking up from a college party in Austin, the gang learns that the girl Sully got a phone number from is actually Bryson's girlfriend. On their way back to Burleson, they argue whether or not to tell Liz about Bryson's dishonesty. Before they can decide however, Sully and Troy accidentally sends the message via text. They try to cover up their mistake by "text-bombing" Liz with pointless and funny comments, but she eventually reads the message. The episode ends with Liz finding comfort from Louis after hearing the bad news.
4	"The Best Laid Plans"	March 1, 2011	204	1.6
After learning Bryson wasn't honest with her, Liz attempts to ignore her friends in Texas by shifting her attention to the crucial task of finding an apartment in New York. She also takes the opportunity to shift her focus to her blossoming friendship with Louis as well and if left wondering if he wants to be more than friends. Meanwhile, Bryson and the gang attempt to contact her many times, but Liz keeps ignoring all of their phone calls and messages, leaving Sully neglected from his best friend and angry at Bryson for breaking her heart.
5	"Three's a Crowd"	March 8, 2011	205	2.3
Louis comes to Liz's rescue when she fails to find an apartment by allowing her to stay at his place temporarily. However, tension already rises when Louis's roommate gets slightly territorial. Meanwhile, the nerds find a way to contact Liz by using her mom's phone. Liz must decide between heading home to Texas for the summer or staying in New York.
6	"You Can't Go Home Again"	March 15, 2011	206	1.5
Liz goes home to Burleson, and finds that much has changed since she left; she finds out that Cori Cooper is now pregnant and her favorite Malt Shop is closed down. Sully leaves for Eagle Scout camp as soon as Liz arrives. Later, Taylor makes a shocking announcement at her graduation party.
7	"Save Our Sully"	March 22, 2011	207	N/A
Sully goes into a state of depression when he fails to pass his Eagle Scouts test. To cheer Sully up, Liz agrees to finally talk to Bryson face to face. After their talk leaves their relationship still strained, she finally opens Bryson's gift to her and later resolves to return to New York.
8	"New Leash on Life"	March 29, 2011	208	N/A
Liz returns to New York after making her peace with Texas and moves into a new apartment with her friend Mark in Brooklyn. Later on, Liz plans to go on a date with Louis, but the night takes a turn when the nerds make a surprise visit the same night. Sully and the gang tag along on their dinner date and interrogate Louis to the point where it becomes awkward for everyone. After dinner, they head off to a local arcade, where the mood becomes lighter. Sully and the gang feel awkward around Liz because they have not told her about Bryson being in New York as well (for his internship at Spin Magazine). By the end of the night, they show their approval of Louis as Liz and Louis' relationship begins on a good note.
9	"Love's a Drag"	April 12, 2011	209	N/A
On a day of dog-walking, Liz and Louis plan to go on their first official date at her roommate Mark's drag show. While dog-walking with Louis, Sully meets Marlene, the girl of his dreams, when he realizes he might have lost her dog while walking him. When Miles and Troy decide to hang out with Bryson at Spin Magazine instead of helping Sully, they unintentionally invite Bryson to the drag show and Liz learns why the guys have been acting strange when she sees him while on her date.
10	"The Hurried Life"	April 19, 2011	210	N/A
On the nerds' last day in New York, Miles rushes to complete his "NY or Suck-It" list. This all-day journey leaves Liz forced to spend an entire day with Bryson, whom she ends up fighting with constantly. Bryson finds out later on that Liz is dating Louis, making him slightly jealous. Sully successfully avoids spending this awkward day with the nerds by claiming he's visiting his sister in West Point. In reality, he attempts to spend time with Marlene before he leaves. Thanks to Louis' encouraging words and a nudge in the right direction, Sully successfully makes a good impression on Marlene as they promise to keep in touch. Taylor arrives in New York just as the nerds' time in New York ends.
11	"Best in Show"	April 26, 2011	211	N/A
When Louis has trouble with an upcoming gig, Liz offers her services to sing with him in a 1980s show, taking their relationship to a new level. However, it gets complicated when Louis invites Bryson to the show. Bryson leaves the show once he sees Louis and Liz kissing backstage. Back in Texas, Miles and Troy find out about Sully's romantic interest and try to help him raise money to return to New York for Marlene. When Sully's mom discovers his intentions to return to New York, she agrees to help pay for the trip.
12	"New Beginnings"	May 3, 2011	212	N/A
Louis breaks the news to Liz that he's going on tour for three months, leaving his relationship with Liz on the line. Liz receives a mysterious note and questions whether it was Louis or Bryson who sent it. Meanwhile, Sully arrives in New York to tell Marlene how he feels during an interview with Stan Lee. Before he does, he advises Bryson to take the opportunity to tell Liz how he truly feels.

== Critical response ==
Emily VanDerWerff of The A.V. Club gave the first episode of season one a C rating. She compared the show to the style of the Coen Brothers films and of mockumentary of Christopher Guest, but criticized it for having learned all the wrong lessons. She credited the show with having some goofy charm but was disappointed by the same old stereotypes. She questioned if the show is a sitcom blended with a reality show or the other way around. She criticized the heavily-scripted nature of the show, but noted the show could be fixed if it was more honest and decisive about what it really wants to be.

Mike Hale of The New York Times gave a somewhat similar opinion, saying, "it registers more as a sitcom than a reality show — it's so stylized and carefully planned and post-produced, it's the next best thing to scripted, if it isn’t in fact a wholly scripted put-on," but remarks, "and that's the point." He says of the premise that "it's as if the geeky misfit viewer who hates all those blonde women on The Hills were suddenly part of the show." Although he says the main protagonist "doesn’t make her life or her opinions seem interesting enough to draw you in," he finds some of the other characters make more of an impression.
