= Fort Worth Spinks Airport =

Airport in Texas, United States

- IATA: none; ICAO: KFWS; FAA LID: FWS

Summary
- Airport type: Public
- Owner: City of Fort Worth
- Serves: Fort Worth, Texas
- Elevation AMSL: 700 ft (210 m)
- Coordinates: 32°33′55″N 097°18′29″W
- Website: fortworthgov.org/...

Map
- Location of airport in Texas FWS (the United States)

Runways
Direction	Length		Surface
Direction	ft	m	Surface
18R/36L	6,002	1,829	Asphalt
18L/36R	3,660	1,116	Turf

Statistics (2024)
- Aircraft operations (year ending 4/30/2024): 91,160
- Based aircraft: 276
- Source: Federal Aviation Administration

Fort Worth Spinks Airport (ICAO: KFWS, FAA LID: FWS) is a city-owned, public-use airport located 14 nautical miles (26 km) south of the central business district of Fort Worth, in Tarrant County, Texas, United States. It is the newest of the three airports that are owned by the City of Fort Worth and it serves the cities of Fort Worth, Burleson, and Mansfield. The airport is located at the intersection of Interstate 35W and HWY 1187 and serves as a reliever airport for Fort Worth Meacham International Airport and Dallas–Fort Worth International Airport and has Class D designation.

Although most U.S. airports use the same three-letter location identifier for the FAA and IATA, this airport is assigned FWS by the FAA but has no designation from the IATA.

== History ==
Spinks Airport was named for Maurice Hunter "Pappy" Spinks, a renowned aerobatic competitor/promoter and aviation manufacturer who built the nearby Oak Grove Airport, portions of which have been encompassed by Spinks Airport. Pappy was a patron of the Aerobatic Club of America and was described by fellow aerobatic pilots as a "rough edged old millionaire", who had made a fortune during the Vietnam War as a vendor for nearby Bell Helicopter. On May 28, 1989 Oak Grove airport was closed and Spinks Airport was opened.

== Facilities and aircraft ==
Fort Worth Spinks Airport covers an area of 822 acres (333 ha) at an elevation of 700 feet (213 m) above mean sea level. It has two runways: 18R/36L is 6,002 by 100 feet (1,829 x 30 m) with an asphalt surface; 18L/36R is 3,660 by 60 feet (1,116 x 18 m) with a turf surface.

The fixed-base operator (Harrison Aviation) has constructed a 7,400 square feet (690 m^{2}) terminal building that houses their operations and the offices of the airport manager.

For the 12-month period ending April 30, 2024, the airport had 91,160 aircraft operations, an average of 250 per day: 97% general aviation, 2% air taxi, and <1% military. At that time there were 276 aircraft based at this airport: 203 single-engine, 34 multi-engine, 14 jet, 24 helicopter, and 1 glider.

== See also ==
- List of airports in Texas
