= Centennial High School (Burleson, Texas) =

Coordinates: 32.5403°N 97.2988°W

Location
- 201 S. Hurst Rd. Burleson, Texas 76028

Information
- Established: 2010
- School district: Burleson ISD
- Principal: Dena Schimming
- Teaching staff: 123.98 (FTE)
- Grades: 9-12
- Enrollment: 2,099 (2023–2024)
- Student to teacher ratio: 16.93
- Colors: Royal blue, silver, and white
- Mascot: Spartans
- Yearbook: The Spartan
- Website: chs.burlesonisd.net

Centennial High School is a high school in Burleson, Texas and a part of the Burleson Independent School District. The school is located off of E Renfro Road. The Spartans participate in the Class 5A Division of the Texas UIL. For the 2024-2025 school year, the school received an overall rating of "B" from the Texas Education Agency.

The mascot is a Spartan and the main colors are Royal Blue, Silver, and White.

== Notable alumni ==
- Conner Prince (2017), Olympic silver medalist in men's skeet
- Tayton Conerway (2020), basketball player for the Troy Trojans
