= Burleson High School =

Coordinates: 32.5295°N 97.3474°W

Location
- 100 Elk Drive; Burleson, Texas, United States

Information
- Type: Public
- School district: Burleson Independent School District
- Principal: Wayne Leek
- Academic Associate Principal: Angelia Sifford
- Kappa House Vice Principal: Tommy Neal
- Sigma House Vice Principal: Julie Knight
- Omega House Vice Principal: Alan Sypert
- Teaching staff: 118.78 (FTE)
- Grades: 9th through 12th
- Enrollment: 1,782 (2023–2024)
- Student to teacher ratio: 15.00
- Campus type: Suburban
- Colors: Red, White, Black
- Athletics: Over 19 sports
- Athletics conference: 5-AAAAA
- Mascot: Elk
- Website: http://bhs.burlesonisd.net/

Burleson High School is a four-year public high school consisting of grades 9–12 located in Burleson, in the U.S. state of Texas, and is part of the Burleson Independent School District.

== History ==
In 1901, Burleson's first school, the Red Oak Academy, was constructed. In 1909, the building was destroyed by fire. The State of Texas granted a charter for an independent school district, and the citizens of Burleson voted to construct a new school. By 1910 the new school was opened, on what is now the old Nola Dunn Campus. The school was later torn down and a new high school was constructed in the 1960s. In 1997, a new, larger campus was built for the high school. It was built at 100 John Jones Road, but the street name later changed to Elk Drive.

== Notable alumni ==
- Kyle Burns – drummer, Forever the Sickest Kids
- Kelly Clarkson (2000) – Grammy Award winning singer, songwriter, American Idol season 1 winner, and daytime talk show host
- Jonathan Cook – singer, Forever the Sickest Kids
- Jalen Kitna (2021) – college football quarterback
- Liz Lee – protagonist of the quasi-reality MTV show My Life as Liz
- Dylan Raiola – College football quarterback for the Nebraska Cornhuskers
- Kody Russey (2016) – NFL player
- Stacy Sykora – three-time Olympian volleyball player (2000, 2004, 2008)
