= Rendon, Texas =

- CDP
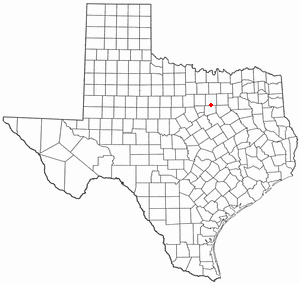
- Location of Rendon, Texas
- Coordinates: 32°34′45″N 97°15′08″W
- Country: United States
- State: Texas
- County: Tarrant

Area
  - Total: 24.7 sq mi (64.0 km^{2})
  - Land: 24.6 sq mi (63.8 km^{2})
  - Water: 0.077 sq mi (0.2 km^{2})
- Elevation: 702 ft (214 m)

Population (2010)
  - Total: 12,552
  - Density: 510/sq mi (197/km^{2})
- Time zone: UTC-6 (Central (CST))
  - Summer (DST): UTC-5 (CDT)
- ZIP Codes: 76028, 76063, 76140
- FIPS code: 48-61568
- GNIS feature ID: 2409164

Rendon is a census-designated place (CDP) in Tarrant County, Texas, United States. The population was 13,533 in 2020.

== Geography ==
According to the United States Census Bureau, the CDP has a total area of 24.7 square miles (64.0 km^{2}), of which 24.6 square miles (63.8 km^{2}) is land and 0.08 square miles (0.2 km^{2}), or 0.33%, is water.

== Demographics ==
Historical population
Census	Pop.	Note	%±
1990	7,658		—
2000	9,022		17.8%
2010	12,552		39.1%
2020	13,533		7.8%
U.S. Decennial Census; 1850–1900 1910; 1920 1930 1940; 1950 1960 1970; 1980 1990 2000; 2010

Rendon first appeared as a census designated place in the 1990 U.S. census.

=== Racial and ethnic composition ===
Rendon CDP, Texas – Racial and ethnic composition Note: the US Census treats Hispanic/Latino as an ethnic category. This table excludes Latinos from the racial categories and assigns them to a separate category. Hispanics/Latinos may be of any race.
Race / Ethnicity (NH = Non-Hispanic)	Pop 2000	Pop 2010	Pop 2020	% 2000	% 2010	% 2020
White alone (NH)	7,780	9,712	9,200	86.23%	77.37%	67.98%
Black or African American alone (NH)	369	718	711	4.09%	5.72%	5.25%
Native American or Alaska Native alone (NH)	54	61	74	0.60%	0.49%	0.55%
Asian alone (NH)	31	110	132	0.34%	0.88%	0.98%
Native Hawaiian or Pacific Islander alone (NH)	3	3	7	0.03%	0.02%	0.05%
Other race alone (NH)	7	8	44	0.08%	0.06%	0.33%
Mixed race or Multiracial (NH)	72	141	534	0.80%	1.12%	3.95%
Hispanic or Latino (any race)	706	1,799	2,831	7.83%	14.33%	20.92%
Total	9,022	12,552	13,533	100.00%	100.00%	100.00%

=== 2020 census ===
As of the 2020 census, Rendon had a population of 13,533. The median age was 42.8 years. 23.2% of residents were under the age of 18 and 17.2% of residents were 65 years of age or older. For every 100 females there were 103.3 males, and for every 100 females age 18 and over there were 101.0 males age 18 and over.

55.6% of residents lived in urban areas, while 44.4% lived in rural areas.

There were 4,640 households in Rendon, of which 33.8% had children under the age of 18 living in them. Of all households, 63.9% were married-couple households, 14.1% were households with a male householder and no spouse or partner present, and 16.9% were households with a female householder and no spouse or partner present. About 16.9% of all households were made up of individuals and 7.4% had someone living alone who was 65 years of age or older. There were 3,739 families residing in the CDP.

There were 4,864 housing units, of which 4.6% were vacant. The homeowner vacancy rate was 1.0% and the rental vacancy rate was 7.2%.
