= Joshua, Texas =

- City
- Interactive map of Joshua, Texas
- Location in Texas Location in the United States
- Coordinates: 32°27′32″N 97°22′37″W
- Country: United States
- State: Texas
- County: Johnson

Area
  - Total: 9.20 sq mi (23.82 km^{2})
  - Land: 9.15 sq mi (23.69 km^{2})
  - Water: 0.050 sq mi (0.13 km^{2})
- Elevation: 915 ft (279 m)

Population (2020)
  - Total: 7,891
  - Density: 862.7/sq mi (333.1/km^{2})
- Time zone: UTC-6 (Central (CST))
  - Summer (DST): UTC-5 (CDT)
- ZIP code: 76058
- Area code: 817
- FIPS code: 48-38080
- GNIS feature ID: 2410152
- Website: www.cityofjoshuatx.us

Joshua is a city in Johnson County, Texas, United States. The population was 7,891 at the 2020 census.

== History ==
Joshua is in the Cross Timbers region of Texas, on land patented by W. W. Byers in 1867. The section was sold in 1874 to John Powell. Caddo Grove, 2 miles (3 km) east of Joshua, was the first community in the area. It had its own post office and was a thriving town until the Gulf, Colorado and Santa Fe Railway was completed from Cleburne to Fort Worth in 1881. The railroad missed Caddo Grove, and a station was built on the tracks at the site of future Joshua. The station was originally called "Caddo Peak", but the name was rejected by the post office because of another community with that name. The name "Joshua" was chosen, purportedly by Dr. D. B. McMillan, after the biblical Joshua. W. L. West was the first postmaster when the community received a post office in 1882. In 1883, Caddo Grove's post office was withdrawn.

The plat for Joshua was first surveyed in 1880, and the community was organized in 1881 when the railroad arrived. The first store, opened in 1882 by W. L. West, also housed the post office. By 1890, Joshua had a population of 300, two steam-powered corn mills and cotton gins, a hotel, a general store, and a newspaper, the Johnson County Record. The railroad shipped farm produce, Joshua's largest export. The first one-room school opened in 1890, and in 1899, it moved into a new building. In 1917, this school became Joshua High School. In 1900 and 1912, Joshua suffered major fires. In spite of this, new businesses continued to open. The Citizen's Banking Company, opened in 1904, was run by J. W. Spencer. Two years later, a public water system began. Truck gardens, orchards, and corn and cotton farms surrounded Joshua.

In 1912, the Fort Worth South Traction Line began to provide interurban rail service from Cleburne to Fort Worth, with a stop in Joshua. Service stopped in 1932 because of the growing importance of automobile travel. The first car in Joshua was purchased in 1913. By 1914, the community had a population of 824, two cotton gins, an ice plant, a bank, a newspaper named the Joshua Star, and four churches. Local farms grew cotton and potatoes.

In the mid-1950s, Joshua was incorporated, with Ted Strube as the first mayor. The population dropped to 550 during the 1950s and rose to 924 in 1970. By 1980, it was 1,470. Because of its proximity to Fort Worth, the population grew to 3,828 by 1990. Joshua had 14 businesses in 1970 and 58 in 1980, when seven local manufacturers made such items as aluminum products, boat trailers, leather goods, and windows. The Joshua Tribune began publication in 1970 and was published until the early 1990s, when it moved to Burleson.

Theodore "Ted" Roosevelt Strube was the first mayor of Joshua about 1949 and was one of the founders of the Masonic Lodge in Joshua. His wife, Sylvia Couch Strube, was the first florist of Joshua.

== Geography ==
Joshua is located is bordered to the north by Burleson and to the south by Cleburne, the county seat. Texas State Highway 174 (Broadway Street) runs through the city, leading north 7 miles (11 km) to the center of Burleson and south 8 miles (13 km) to the center of Cleburne. Fort Worth is 22 miles (35 km) north of Joshua.

According to the United States Census Bureau, Joshua has a total area of 6.8 square miles (17.6 km^{2}), of which 0.04 sq mi (0.1 km^{2}), or 0.47%, is covered by water. The north side of the city is drained by Village Creek, a tributary of the Trinity River, while the south side is drained by tributaries of East Buffalo Creek, flowing to the Nolan River, part of the Brazos River watershed.

A hill known as Brushy Knob stands to the west of Joshua, at a height of 1,042 feet above mean sea level.

== Demographics ==
Historical population
Census	Pop.	Note	%±
1960	764		—
1970	924		20.9%
1980	1,470		59.1%
1990	3,828		160.4%
2000	4,528		18.3%
2010	5,910		30.5%
2020	7,891		33.5%
2023 (est.)	8,901		12.8%
U.S. Decennial Census; 2020

=== 2020 census ===
As of the 2020 census, Joshua had a population of 7,891 people and 2,066 families residing in the city.

The median age was 37.3 years; 26.2% of residents were under the age of 18 and 16.5% of residents were 65 years of age or older.

For every 100 females there were 90.7 males, and for every 100 females age 18 and over there were 86.3 males age 18 and over.

87.5% of residents lived in urban areas, while 12.5% lived in rural areas.

There were 2,941 households in Joshua, of which 37.3% had children under the age of 18 living in them. Of all households, 51.9% were married-couple households, 13.6% were households with a male householder and no spouse or partner present, and 28.4% were households with a female householder and no spouse or partner present. About 23.6% of all households were made up of individuals and 12.4% had someone living alone who was 65 years of age or older.

There were 3,095 housing units, of which 5.0% were vacant. The homeowner vacancy rate was 1.2% and the rental vacancy rate was 7.8%.

Racial composition as of the 2020 census
Race	Number	Percent
White	6,171	78.2%
Black or African American	142	1.8%
American Indian and Alaska Native	87	1.1%
Asian	39	0.5%
Native Hawaiian and Other Pacific Islander	26	0.3%
Some other race	540	6.8%
Two or more races	886	11.2%
Hispanic or Latino (of any race)	1,520	19.3%

== Education ==
Public education in Joshua is provided by the Joshua Independent School District. The district covers 76.68 square miles (199 km^{2}) and consists of eight campuses.
