= Crowley, Texas =

Multi-county city in Texas, United States

- City
- Flag
- Motto: "Governed by the People"
- Location of Crowley in Tarrant County, Texas
- Coordinates: 32°34′37″N 97°21′55″W
- country: United States
- State: Texas
- counties: Tarrant, Johnson

Government
  - Type: Council–manager

Area
  - Total: 7.32 sq mi (18.96 km^{2})
  - Land: 7.31 sq mi (18.93 km^{2})
  - Water: 0.012 sq mi (0.03 km^{2})
- Elevation: 761 ft (232 m)

Population (2020)
  - Total: 18,070
  - Density: 2,251.9/sq mi (869.47/km^{2})
- Time zone: UTC-6 (CST)
  - Summer (DST): UTC-5 (CDT)
- ZIP code: 76036
- Area codes: 817, 682
- GNIS feature ID: 2410270
- Website: www.ci.crowley.tx.us

Crowley is a city located mainly in Tarrant County in the U.S. state of Texas. The population was 18,070 at the 2020 census, up 40.8% from the 2010 census.

== History ==
Around 1848, pioneers began farming the area around Deer Creek. The settlement moved a mile or so west to the site of present-day downtown Crowley when the Gulf, Colorado and Santa Fe Railway built pens and laid tracks there. The first station depot was built in 1885. The community was named for S. H. Crowley, who was the master of transportation for the railroad.

An election to approve the incorporation of Crowley was held on February 3, 1951. The town council voted to change the designation of Crowley from a town to a city on September 3, 1972.

== Geography ==
Crowley is in southern Tarrant County, with a 5.8-acre (2 ha) portion extending south into Johnson County. According to the United States Census Bureau, the city has a total area of 7.3 square miles (18.8 km^{2}), of which 0.01 square miles (0.03 km^{2}), or 0.18%, are water.

The city is bordered to the north and east by Fort Worth and to the south by Burleson. The center of Crowley is at the crossroads of Farm to Market Roads 1187 and 731.

=== Neighborhoods ===
- Astoria Crossing
- Bent Creek Farms
- Bridges
- Carson Ranch
- Colina Vista
- Country Hill
- Crescent Springs Ranch
- Crestview
- Crystal Creek
- Deer Creek
- Emily Estates
- Horse Creek Farm
- Lasater Ranch
- Laurenwood
- Longhorn Crossing
- Mayfair
- Mayfair South
- Rancho Vista
- Rocky Creek Ranch
- Sendero Oaks

== Demographics ==
Historical population
Census	Pop.	Note	%±
1960	583		—
1970	2,662		356.6%
1980	5,852		119.8%
1990	6,974		19.2%
2000	7,467		7.1%
2010	12,838		71.9%
2020	18,070		40.8%
2023 (est.)	19,932		10.3%
U.S. Decennial Census

=== 2020 census ===
As of the 2020 census, Crowley had a population of 18,070 residents and 3,844 families living in the city. The median age was 33.5 years; 28.1% of residents were under the age of 18 and 10.7% of residents were 65 years of age or older. For every 100 females there were 92.1 males, and for every 100 females age 18 and over there were 88.5 males age 18 and over.

99.5% of residents lived in urban areas, while 0.5% lived in rural areas.

There were 6,044 households in Crowley, of which 43.7% had children under the age of 18 living in them. Of all households, 54.5% were married-couple households, 13.2% were households with a male householder and no spouse or partner present, and 25.3% were households with a female householder and no spouse or partner present. About 17.0% of all households were made up of individuals and 6.1% had someone living alone who was 65 years of age or older.

There were 6,229 housing units, of which 3.0% were vacant. The homeowner vacancy rate was 1.5% and the rental vacancy rate was 4.4%.

Racial composition as of the 2020 census
Race	Number	Percent
White	9,830	54.4%
Black or African American	3,695	20.4%
American Indian and Alaska Native	139	0.8%
Asian	358	2.0%
Native Hawaiian and Other Pacific Islander	16	0.1%
Some other race	1,692	9.4%
Two or more races	2,340	12.9%
Hispanic or Latino (of any race)	4,577	25.3%

=== 2010 census ===
According to the 2010 census, there were 12,838 people, 4,408 households, and 3,424 families residing in the city. The population density was 1,769.5 inhabitants per square mile (683.2/km^{2}). There were 4,714 housing units at an average density of 649.8 units per square mile (250.9 units/km^{2}).

== Education ==
The Crowley Independent School District extends north into Fort Worth and includes 27 public schools. Most of the district's schools are located within the Fort Worth city limits, including North Crowley High School and 9th Grade Campus, Crowley Middle School, and 16 elementary schools. Crowley High School and 9th Grade Campus, Richard Allie Middle School, Summer Creek Middle School, H.F. Stevens Middle School, and three elementary schools are within the Crowley city limits.

Nazarene Christian Academy in Crowley serves students from kindergarten through 12th grade.
