= Burleson, Texas =

- City
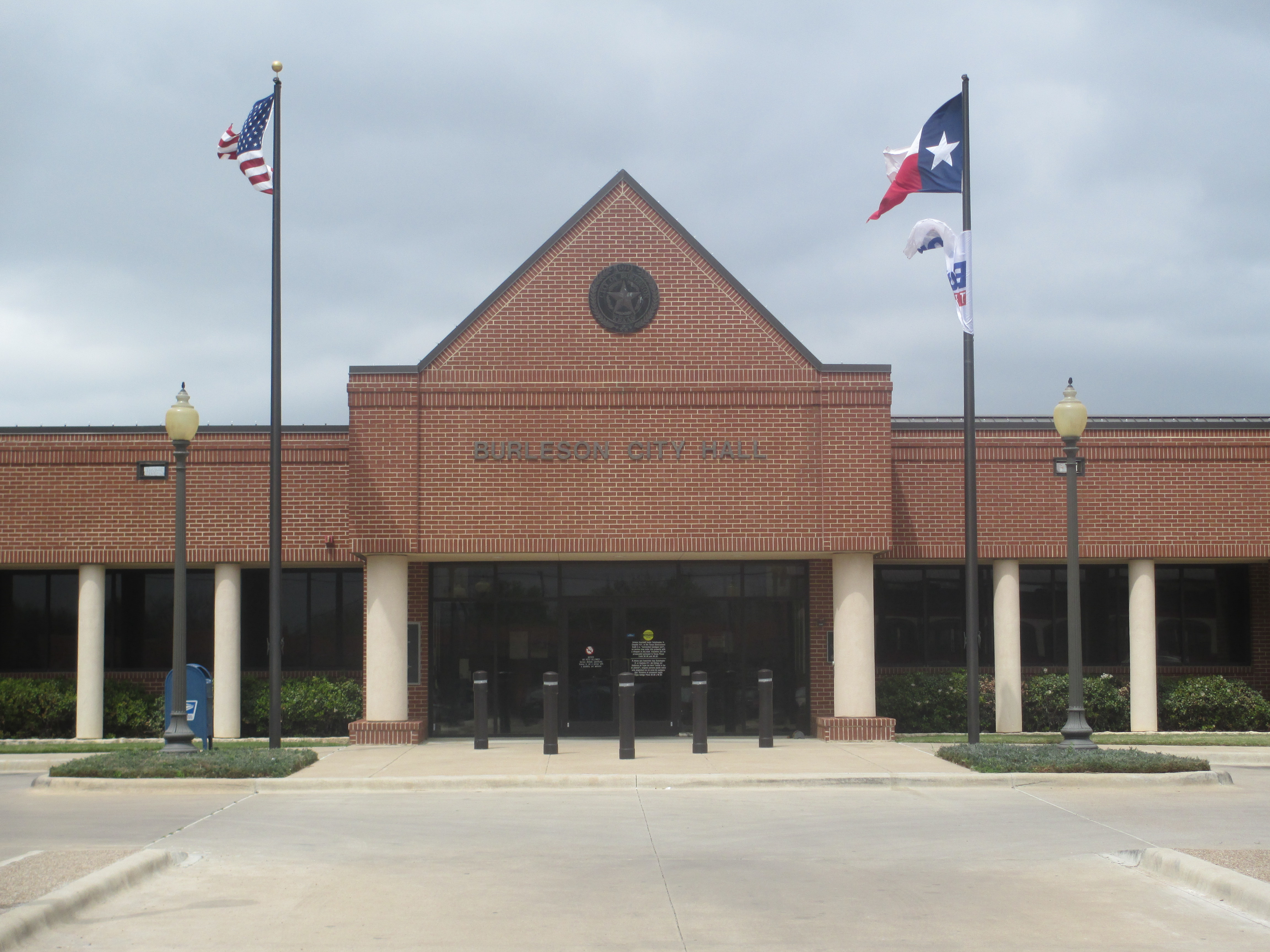
- Burleson City Hall
- Interactive map of Burleson, Texas
- Coordinates: 32°30′09″N 97°19′38″W
- Country: United States
- State: Texas
- Counties: Johnson, Tarrant

Government
  - Type: Council–manager

Area
  - Total: 28.32 sq mi (73.36 km^{2})
  - Land: 28.25 sq mi (73.18 km^{2})
  - Water: 0.066 sq mi (0.17 km^{2})
- Elevation: 725 ft (221 m)

Population (2020)
  - Total: 47,641
  - Estimate (2024): 57,625
  - Density: 1,686/sq mi (651.0/km^{2})
- Time zone: UTC-6 (Central (CST))
  - Summer (DST): UTC-5 (Central (CDT))
- ZIP Codes: 76028, 76097, 76058, 76031
- Area codes: 817, 682
- GNIS feature ID: 2409943
- Website: www.burlesontx.com

Burleson (/ˈbɜːrlɪsən/) is a city in Johnson and Tarrant counties in the U.S. state of Texas. It is part of the Dallas-Fort Worth Metroplex. At the 2010 census it had a population of 36,690, and in 2019 it had an estimated population of 48,225. By the 2020 census, its population grew to 48,132 with a 2024 census-estimated population of 57,625.

== History ==
The Missouri–Kansas–Texas Railroad, known as "the Katy", extended its service from Denison to Waco. In 1880 the segment from Fort Worth to Alvarado was being laid out, and a midway depot was needed. Grenville M. Dodge, representing the railroad, purchased land for the depot and a town surrounding it from Rev. Henry C. Renfro at the site of what is now called "Old Town" Burleson. As part of the agreement, Renfro named the town "Burleson", in honor of his teacher Rufus Columbus Burleson, the president of Baylor University. The first lot was sold on October 10, 1880, the date now considered the city's "founding day".

The Burleson Post Office opened in 1882, inside a retail establishment, as was common for small towns at the time. On February 20, 1895, a fire burned down most of the business district, along with several houses. One of the Katy workers, J. C. Jones, had stayed in Burleson and opened a water works for the town, drilling a deep well that provided dozens of hydrants for the residents, but they were not sufficient to extinguish the fire. By the end of the 1800s, Burleson was a bustling rural town, with farms all around, schools, a grocery store, cotton gins and grist mills, a general store, a druggist, a bank, and a jeweler. In 1899, a group of nine women formed a society for cultural advancement and called it the Eumathian Club. The women acquired books, loaned them, and held readings, discussions, and music recitals.

In 1909 the Texas Legislature passed a bill forming the Burleson Independent School District. Construction began in 1912 of the Northern Texas Traction Company interurban line between Fort Worth and Cleburne, with Burleson as a stop along the way. The first day of service was September 1, 1912, with 1,200 passengers on the ten passenger runs that day. Two freight runs per day were made as well. The interurban line provided for the first time two very important things to Burleson: easy access to Fort Worth and Cleburne, and electricity. The interurban station was operated out of a drugstore, whose proprietor became ticket master, and who served travelers pastries and soda from the soda fountain. The old drugstore/station still exists, as the Burleson Heritage Museum at the Burleson Visitor Center, as do two of the interurban cars.

That year, a petition was sent to a Johnson County judge proposing to incorporate the "Town of Burleson", including a survey of the town limits that included most of the original town as set out by Grenville Dodge. An election was held, the petition passed, and the county judge ordered it so. On May 21, 1912, Burleson was incorporated.

The 1920 census showed the population of Burleson to be 241. In 1930 the population was 591. Due to the increasing popularity of automobiles, combined with the Great Depression, the interurban line closed in 1931. In 1940 the population decreased to 573, as people had left Burleson during the depression to find jobs wherever they could. In 1950 the population was 791, and grew to 2,345 in 1960, perhaps partly due to the opening of Interstate 35 through the town that year. By 1970 the population was 7,713, by 1980 11,734. In 1990 the population of Burleson was 16,113. In 2000 the population had grown to 20,976, and in 2010 there were 36,690 people in Burleson.

== Geography ==
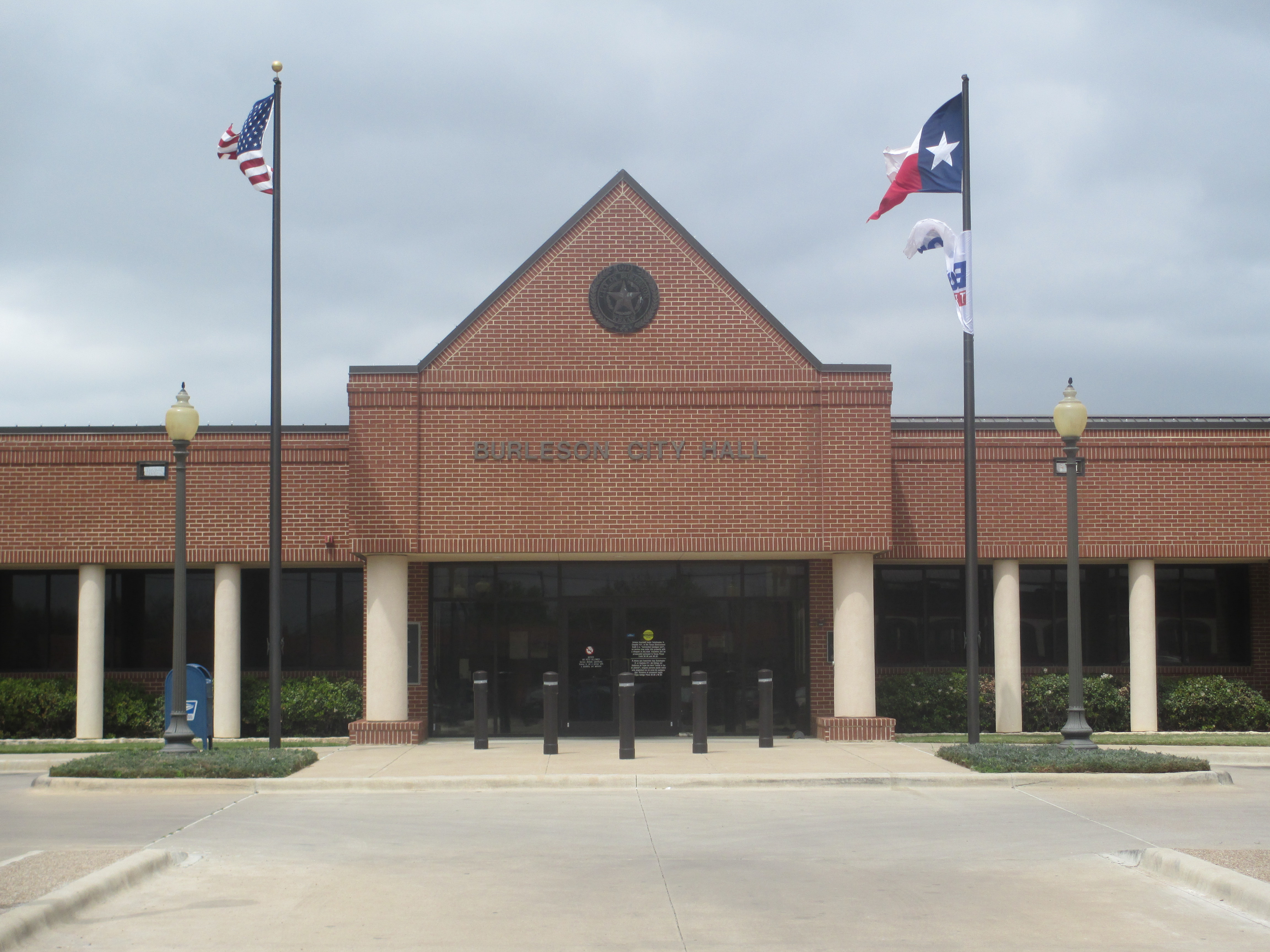
Burleson City Hall

Most of Burleson is in northern Johnson County, with a small portion extending north into Tarrant County. The city is bordered to the north by the cities of Crowley and Fort Worth, and to the southwest by the city of Joshua. The Burleson city limits extend southeast from the city center 8 miles (13 km) in a narrow corridor toward Alvarado along Interstate 35W. I-35W leads north 15 miles (24 km) to the center of Fort Worth and south 40 miles (64 km) to Hillsboro. Texas State Highway 174 begins at I-35W in the northern part of Burleson and runs southwest 15 miles (24 km) to Cleburne, the Johnson county seat.

As of 2010, Burleson had a total area of 26.07 square miles (67.52 km^{2}), of which 26.01 square miles (67.36 km^{2}) were land and 0.07 square miles (0.17 km^{2}), or 0.25%, were water. Village Creek, a tributary of the Trinity River, flows to the northeast through the city. Most of Burleson lies between 700 and 800 feet (210 and 240 m) in elevation.

=== Climate ===
The climate is characterized by hot, humid summers and generally mild to cool winters. According to the Köppen Climate Classification system, Burleson has a humid subtropical climate, abbreviated "Cfa" on climate maps.

July and August are typically the hottest months, with highs averaging around 95 °F (35 °C) and lows around 72 °F (22 °C). December and January are the coldest months, with highs averaging 56 °F (13 °C) and lows around 34 °F (1 °C). Average annual rainfall is 37 inches (940 mm) per year.

Climate data for Burleson, Texas (1991–2020 normals, extremes 1986–present)
Month	Jan	Feb	Mar	Apr	May	Jun	Jul	Aug	Sep	Oct	Nov	Dec	Year
Record high °F (°C)	85 (29)	95 (35)	95 (35)	96 (36)	101 (38)	103 (39)	109 (43)	109 (43)	110 (43)	98 (37)	91 (33)	90 (32)	110 (43)
Mean daily maximum °F (°C)	56.8 (13.8)	60.8 (16.0)	68.0 (20.0)	75.8 (24.3)	82.8 (28.2)	90.6 (32.6)	94.7 (34.8)	95.2 (35.1)	88.5 (31.4)	78.3 (25.7)	66.9 (19.4)	58.3 (14.6)	76.4 (24.7)
Daily mean °F (°C)	45.2 (7.3)	48.9 (9.4)	56.0 (13.3)	63.7 (17.6)	71.9 (22.2)	79.7 (26.5)	83.4 (28.6)	83.5 (28.6)	76.6 (24.8)	66.0 (18.9)	55.2 (12.9)	46.7 (8.2)	64.7 (18.2)
Mean daily minimum °F (°C)	33.5 (0.8)	36.9 (2.7)	44.0 (6.7)	51.6 (10.9)	61.0 (16.1)	68.8 (20.4)	72.0 (22.2)	71.8 (22.1)	64.7 (18.2)	53.8 (12.1)	43.5 (6.4)	35.2 (1.8)	53.1 (11.7)
Record low °F (°C)	10 (−12)	−3 (−19)	14 (−10)	26 (−3)	36 (2)	52 (11)	58 (14)	53 (12)	41 (5)	23 (−5)	19 (−7)	−6 (−21)	−6 (−21)
Average precipitation inches (mm)	2.30 (58)	2.61 (66)	3.65 (93)	2.97 (75)	4.24 (108)	3.53 (90)	2.21 (56)	2.32 (59)	3.12 (79)	4.37 (111)	2.66 (68)	2.56 (65)	36.54 (928)
Average snowfall inches (cm)	0.0 (0.0)	0.0 (0.0)	0.0 (0.0)	0.0 (0.0)	0.0 (0.0)	0.0 (0.0)	0.0 (0.0)	0.0 (0.0)	0.0 (0.0)	0.0 (0.0)	0.1 (0.25)	0.1 (0.25)	0.2 (0.51)
Average precipitation days (≥ 0.01 in)	6.2	6.2	7.3	6.2	7.9	6.2	4.4	4.5	5.2	6.4	6.0	6.1	72.6
Average snowy days (≥ 0.1 in)	0.0	0.0	0.0	0.0	0.0	0.0	0.0	0.0	0.0	0.0	0.1	0.2	0.3
Source: NOAA

== Demographics ==
Historical population
Census	Pop.	Note	%±
1920	241		—
1930	591		145.2%
1940	573		−3.0%
1950	791		38.0%
1960	2,345		196.5%
1970	7,713		228.9%
1980	11,734		52.1%
1990	16,113		37.3%
2000	20,976		30.2%
2010	36,690		74.9%
2020	47,641		29.8%
2024 (est.)	56,253		18.1%
U.S. Decennial Census

Since the 1920 United States census, Burleson has experienced positive population growth trends.

=== 2020 census ===
As of the 2020 census, Burleson had a population of 47,641; the median age was 35.5 years, with 27.8% of residents under the age of 18 and 12.9% aged 65 or older. For every 100 females there were 93.5 males, and for every 100 females age 18 and over there were 89.4 males age 18 and over.

The 2020 census counted 12,330 families among the 16,810 households, of which 42.2% had children under the age of 18 living in them. Of all households, 57.1% were married-couple households, 13.1% were households with a male householder and no spouse or partner present, and 23.8% were households with a female householder and no spouse or partner present. About 19.5% of all households were made up of individuals and 8.9% had someone living alone who was 65 years of age or older.

There were 17,545 housing units, of which 4.2% were vacant. Among occupied housing units, 71.5% were owner-occupied and 28.5% were renter-occupied. The homeowner vacancy rate was 1.0% and the rental vacancy rate was 7.1%.

95.9% of residents lived in urban areas, while 4.1% lived in rural areas.

Racial composition as of the 2020 census
Race	Percent
White	77.2%
Black or African American	4.6%
American Indian and Alaska Native	0.8%
Asian	1.6%
Native Hawaiian and Other Pacific Islander	0.1%
Some other race	4.7%
Two or more races	11.1%
Hispanic or Latino (of any race)	16.3%

== Economy ==
According to Burleson's 2023 Annual Comprehensive Financial Report, the top employers in the city were:

#	Employer	# of Employees
1	Burleson ISD	1,600
2	Walmart	480
3	City of Burleson	459
4	H.E.B. Grocery	400
5	Jellystone RV Ranch/Pirates Cove	400
6	Air Center Helicopter	350
7	Golden State Foods	320
8	Champion Buildings Mfg	300
9	Hayes & Stolz	150
10	Basden Steel	140

== Education ==
Burleson is served primarily by the Burleson Independent School District (BISD), the Joshua Independent School District (JISD), the Everman Independent School District (EISD), and a small part of the Mansfield Independent School District (MISD).

BISD high schools include Burleson High School, Centennial High School, Game Development Design School (formerly REALM), Crossroads High School, and Burleson Collegiate High School. The Burleson Higher Education Center provides a local campus for Hill College and Texas Tech University.

== Infrastructure ==
=== Airport ===
Fort Worth Spinks Airport is located on the northern edge of the Burleson city limits.

== Notable people ==
- Robert B. Anderson, former Secretary of the Treasury, Deputy Secretary of Defense, and Secretary of the Navy
- Kelly Clarkson, Grammy and Emmy Award-winning pop rock, singer-songwriter
- Ethan Couch, criminal known for receiving a light sentence after being convicted of four counts of intoxicated manslaughter
- Casey Donahew, Texas country singer songwriter;
- Trent Grisham, New York Yankees center fielder
- Jalen Kitna, college football quarterback for the UAB Blazers
- Conner Prince, Olympic silver medalist in men's skeet
- Dylan Raiola, college football quarterback for the Nebraska Cornhuskers
- Kody Russey, NFL player
- Stacy Sykora, United States women's national volleyball team player 1999–2010
- Rachel Starr, actress
