= 1978 Cleveland Browns season =

NFL team season

- Owner: Art Modell
- Head coach: Sam Rutigliano
- Home stadium: Cleveland Municipal Stadium

Results
- Record: 8–8
- Division place: 3rd AFC Central
- Playoffs: Did not qualify
- Pro Bowlers: FS Thom Darden

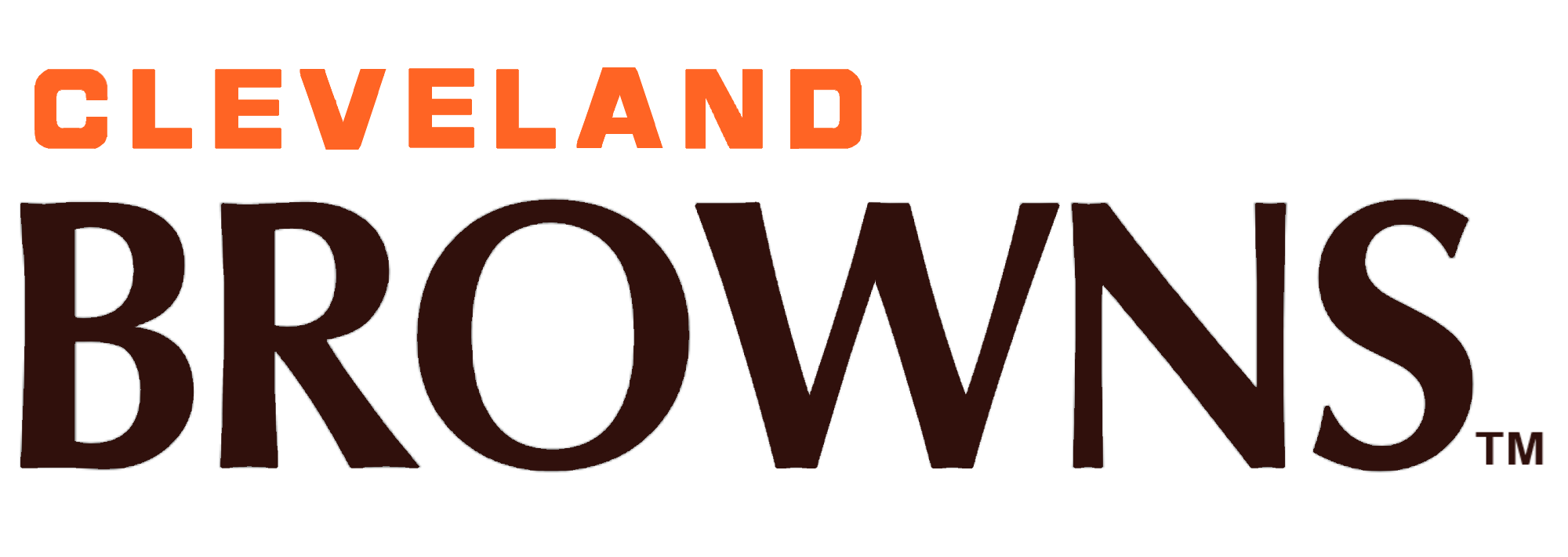
Primay script logo used by the Cleveland Browns, 1975-1995

The 1978 Cleveland Browns season was the team's 29th season with the National Football League (NFL). After nearly three years of struggling offensively – and not making the playoffs—while posting just one winning record under ultra-strict, disciplinarian head coach Forrest Gregg, the Browns in 1978 decided to take a softer approach to liven up their attack – and their team. They did so by hiring a virtually unknown assistant at the time, New Orleans Saints receivers coach Sam Rutigliano, to replace Gregg, who was fired with one game left in the 1977 season. Rutigliano was the fourth head coach hired by Art Modell in his 18 years as club owner to that point, and it marked the first time Modell had not promoted from within the organization to fill the spot.

After a period of limited offensive production, the team appointed Rutigliano as head coach, under whom the offense improved during the second half of the season. In the final eight games, the team scored 30 or more points in four contests. Quarterback Brian Sipe’s performance also improved under Rutigliano’s system. In the 1978 season, Sipe recorded 21 touchdown passes and 15 interceptions with a passer rating of 80.7, marking his strongest statistical season to that point in his career with the Browns.

The Browns started well, winning their first three games over the San Francisco 49ers (24–7), Cincinnati Bengals (13–10 in overtime) and Atlanta Falcons (24–16). They then stood 4–2 after beating the Saints 24–16 three games later. They surrendered 34 or more points in three successive games at the very end of the year. The end result was an 8–8 finish in which the Browns were outscored by 22 points overall, 356 to 334, in the first year that the NFL expanded from a 14- to a 16-game regular season. The Browns top draft choice that year, future Hall of Fame TE Ozzie Newsome, fresh off of an NCAA National Championship with Paul "Bear" Bryant's Alabama Crimson Tide team, had a solid rookie season, snaring 38 passes for 589 yards and two touchdowns.

== Offseason ==
=== NFL draft ===
The following were selected in the 1978 NFL draft.

1978 Cleveland Browns draft
| Round | Selection | Player | Position | College | Notes |
|---|---|---|---|---|---|
| 1 | 12 | Clay Matthews | Linebacker | USC | |
| 1 | 23 | Ozzie Newsome | Tight end | Alabama | |
| 2 | 39 | Johnny Evans | Punter | North Carolina State | |
| 3 | 67 | Larry Collins | Running back | Texas A&I | |
| 3 | 68 | Mark Miller | Quarterback | Bowling Green | |
| 4 | 103 | Pete Pullara | Offensive Guard | Tennessee-Chattanooga | |
| 5 | 122 | Keith Wright | Wide receiver | Memphis State | |
| 6 | 149 | Al Pitts | Center | Michigan State | |
| 8 | 205 | Jesse Turnbow | Defensive tackle | Tennessee | |
| 9 | 234 | Jon Kramer | Guard | Baylor | |
| 10 | 261 | Brent Watson | Offensive tackle | Tennessee | |
| 11 | 290 | Larry Gillard | Defensive tackle | Mississippi State | |
| 12 | 317 | Leo Biedermann | Offensive tackle | California | |

== Personnel ==
=== Staff / Coaches ===
1978 Cleveland Browns staff
| Front office: Owner and President – Art Modell; Executive Vice President/General Manager – Peter Hadhazy; Head coaches: Head Coach – Sam Rutigliano; Offensive coaches: Quarterbacks – Jim Shofner; Offensive backfield – Jim Garrett; Receivers – Rich Kotite; Offensive line – Rod Humenuik | Defensive coaches: Defensive line – Buck Buchanan; Linebackers – Dick MacPherson; Defensive backfield – Chuck Weber; Special teams coaches: Special Teams – John Petercuskie; Film Coordinator - Ed Ulinski; Athletic Trainer - Leo Murphy |

=== Roster ===
1978 Cleveland Browns roster
| Quarterbacks (QB): 17 Brian Sipe; 15 Mark Miller; Running backs (RB): 23 Larry Collins; 35 Calvin Hill; 30 Cleo Miller; 34 Greg Pruitt; 43 Mike Pruitt; Wide receivers (WR): 83 Ricky Feacher; 85 Dave Logan; 33 Reggie Rucker; 89 Keith Wright; Tight ends (TE): 82 Ozzie Newsome; 84 Gary Parris; 81 Oscar Roan | Offensive linemen (OL): 69 Leo Biedermann T; 62 George Buehler G; 63 Barry Darrow T; 54 Tom DeLeone C; 73 Doug Dieken T; 68 Robert Jackson G; 65 Henry Sheppard G; 79 Gerry Sullivan G/C; Defensive linemen (DL): 66 Earl Edwards DT; 64 Joe Jones DE; 70 Mack Mitchell DE; 75 Ken Novak DT; 72 Jerry Sherk DT; 78 Mickey Sims DT; 74 Mike St. Clair DE; 71 Jesse Turnbow DT | Linebackers (LB): 52 Dick Ambrose MLB; 60 Bob Babich MLB; 59 Charlie Hall OLB; 56 Robert Jackson MLB; 57 Clay Matthews OLB; Defensive backs (DB): 28 Ron Bolton CB; 27 Thom Darden FS; 21 Oliver Davis CB; 47 Ricky Jones SS; 40 Tom London CB; 20 Tony Peters SS; 24 Randy Rich CB; 22 Clarence Scott CB; Special teams (ST): 12 Don Cockroft K; 8 Johnny Evans | Reserve: 55 Dave Graf LB (IR); 86 Gerald Irons LB (IR); 67 Pete Pullara G (IR); 26 Tom Sullivan RB (IR); Rookies in italics |

== Regular season ==
=== Schedule ===
| Week | Date | Opponent | Result | Record | Venue | Attendance | Recap |
|---|---|---|---|---|---|---|---|
| 1 | September 3 | San Francisco 49ers | **W** 24–7 | 1–0 | Cleveland Municipal Stadium | 68,973 | Recap |
| 2 | September 10 | **Cincinnati Bengals** | **W** 13–10 | 2–0 | Cleveland Municipal Stadium | 72,691 | Recap |
| 3 | September 17 | at Atlanta Falcons | **W** 24–16 | 3–0 | Atlanta–Fulton County Stadium | 56,648 | Recap |
| 4 | September 24 | at **Pittsburgh Steelers** | **L** 9–15 | 3–1 | Three Rivers Stadium | 49,573 | Recap |
| 5 | October 1 | **Houston Oilers** | **L** 13–16 | 3–2 | Cleveland Municipal Stadium | 72,776 | Recap |
| 6 | October 8 | at New Orleans Saints | **W** 24–16 | 4–2 | Louisiana Superdome | 50,158 | Recap |
| 7 | October 15 | **Pittsburgh Steelers** | **L** 14–34 | 4–3 | Cleveland Municipal Stadium | 81,302 | Recap |
| 8 | October 22 | at Kansas City Chiefs | **L** 3–17 | 4–4 | Arrowhead Stadium | 41,157 | Recap |
| 9 | October 29 | Buffalo Bills | **W** 41–20 | 5–4 | Cleveland Municipal Stadium | 51,409 | Recap |
| 10 | November 5 | at **Houston Oilers** | **L** 10–14 | 5–5 | Houston Astrodome | 45,827 | Recap |
| 11 | November 12 | Denver Broncos | **L** 7–19 | 5–6 | Cleveland Municipal Stadium | 70,856 | Recap |
| 12 | November 19 | at Baltimore Colts | **W** 45–24 | 6–6 | Memorial Stadium | 45,341 | Recap |
| 13 | November 26 | Los Angeles Rams | **W** 30–19 | 7–6 | Cleveland Municipal Stadium | 55,158 | Recap |
| 14 | December 3 | at Seattle Seahawks | **L** 24–47 | 7–7 | Kingdome | 62,262 | Recap |
| 15 | December 10 | New York Jets | **W** 37–34 | 8–7 | Cleveland Municipal Stadium | 36,881 | Recap |
| 16 | December 17 | at **Cincinnati Bengals** | **L** 16–48 | 8–8 | Riverfront Stadium | 46,985 | Recap |
Note: Intra-division opponents are in **bold** text.

=== Standings ===
AFC Central
| | W | L | T | PCT | DIV | CONF | PF | PA | STK |
|---|---|---|---|---|---|---|---|---|---|
| ^{(1)} Pittsburgh Steelers | 14 | 2 | 0 | .875 | 5–1 | 11–1 | 356 | 195 | W5 |
| ^{(5)} Houston Oilers | 10 | 6 | 0 | .625 | 4–2 | 8–4 | 283 | 298 | L1 |
| Cleveland Browns | 8 | 8 | 0 | .500 | 1–5 | 4–8 | 334 | 356 | L1 |
| Cincinnati Bengals | 4 | 12 | 0 | .250 | 2–4 | 2–10 | 252 | 284 | W3 |

== Game summaries ==
=== Week 3: at Atlanta ===
Week 3: Cleveland Browns at Atlanta Falcons – Game summary

| Quarter | 1 | 2 | 3 | 4 | Total |
|---|---|---|---|---|---|
| Browns | 0 | 17 | 0 | 7 | 24 |
| Falcons | 3 | 7 | 0 | 6 | 16 |

at Atlanta–Fulton County Stadium, Atlanta

- Date: September 17
- Game time: 1:00 p.m. EDT
- Game weather: 79 °F (26 °C), relative humidity 70%, round (wind) 6 mph (9.7 km/h)
- Game attendance: 56,648
- Referee: Gene Barth
- TV announcers (NBC): Jim Simpson (play–by–play) and Paul Warfield (color commentator)

Game information

First quarter

- ATL – Steinfort 24 yard field goal
  Falcons 3, Browns 0

Second quarter

- CLE – Cockroft 43 yard field goal
  Browns 3, Falcons 3
- CLE – Newsome 2 yard pass from Sipe (Cockroft kick)
  Browns 10, Falcons 3
- ATL – Stanback 15 yard rush (Steinfort kick)
  Browns 10, Falcons 10
- CLE – Rucker 27 yard pass from Sipe (Cockroft kick)
  Browns 17, Falcons 10

Third quarter

- No scoring plays

Fourth quarter

- ATL – Strong 2 yard rush (kick failed)
  Browns 17, Falcons 16
- CLE – Sipe 2 yard rush (Cockroft kick)
  Browns 24, Falcons 16

Top passers

- CLE – Brian Sipe 20/35, 219 yds, 2 TD
- ATL – Steve Bartkowski 7/15, 126 yds, 2 INT

Top rushers

- CLE – Mike Pruitt 15 carr, 65 yds
- ATL – Haskel Stanback 7 carr, 31 yds, 1 TD

Top receivers

- CLE – Dave Logan 5 rec, 63 yds
- ATL – Billy Ryckman 3 rec, 48 yds

Turnovers

- CLE – 3
- ATL – 4
