= Miracle at the Met =

1980 National Football League game

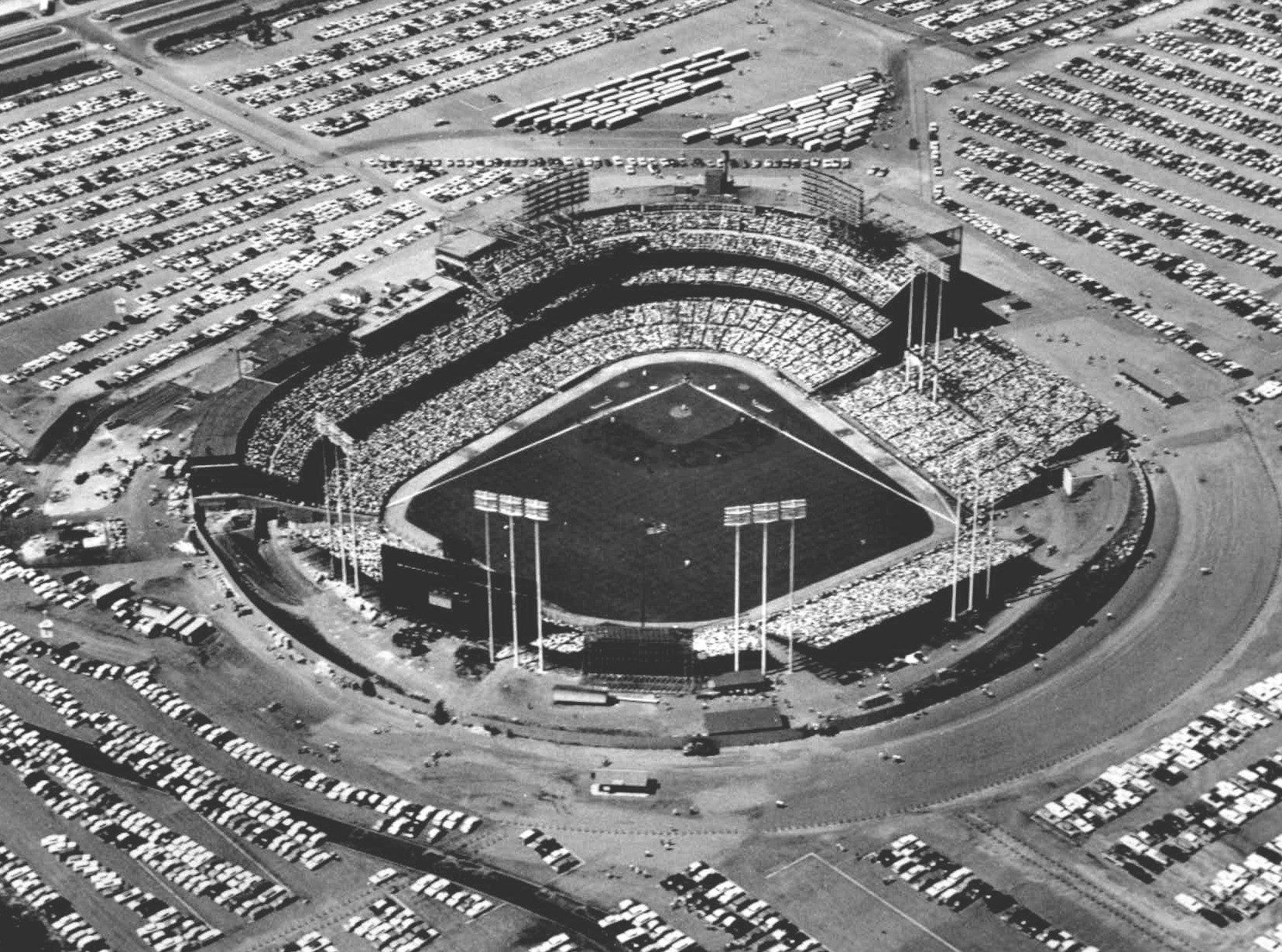
- The game was played at Metropolitan Stadium in Bloomington, Minnesota
Cleveland Browns (10–4)	Minnesota Vikings (8–6)
23	28
Head coach: Sam Rutigliano	Head coach: Bud Grant
	1	2	3	4	Total
CLE	7	6	3	7	23
MIN	0	0	9	19	28
- Date: December 14, 1980
- Stadium: Metropolitan Stadium; Bloomington, Minnesota
- Favorite: Cleveland by 3
- Referee: Ben Dreith

TV in the United States
- Network: NBC
- Announcers: Charlie Jones and Len Dawson

The Miracle at the Met refers to the Minnesota Vikings' comeback win over the Cleveland Browns in Week 15 of the 1980 NFL season. The Vikings trailed 23–9 in the fourth quarter, but won after Vikings quarterback Tommy Kramer passed for two touchdowns to wide receiver Ahmad Rashad in the last two minutes, including a 46-yard Hail Mary pass caught with one hand on the last play of the game. The final play is also known as the "Miracle Catch." The Vikings won, 28–23.

== Game summary ==
The Vikings came into the game with an 8–6 record. The Browns, nicknamed the Kardiac Kids for their many close games, were 10–4. A win for the Browns would clinch them a playoff berth, while a win for the Vikings would clinch them the NFC Central and a playoff appearance. The Browns were favored by 3 points.

=== First half ===
The Browns opened up the scoring in the first quarter when their quarterback, eventual league MVP Brian Sipe, threw an 18-yard touchdown pass to Calvin Hill, giving Cleveland a 7–0 lead. In the second quarter, the Browns added to their lead when Sipe ran for a two-yard touchdown, but kicker Don Cockroft failed to convert the extra point, so the score was 13–0 going into halftime.

=== Early second half ===
In the second half, the Vikings offense came alive, led by Tommy Kramer. Kramer threw a 31-yard touchdown to Joe Senser at the beginning of the quarter. Vikings kicker Rick Danmeier then missed an extra point of his own, making the score 13–6 in favor of the Browns. Cockroft and Danmeier both made short field goals for their teams later in the third quarter, and the score grew to 16–9. Early in the fourth quarter, Cleo Miller ran for a two-yard Browns touchdown, making the score 23–9 with the extra point and seemingly putting the game away.

=== Vikings comeback ===
Kramer led a drive for the Vikings in response that resulted in a second touchdown pass, this time to running back Ted Brown, with 5:01 remaining in the game. Danmeier then missed another extra point, meaning the Vikings still trailed by two scores, 23–15. The Browns received the ensuing kickoff and began trying to run out the clock with repeated handoffs to running back Mike Pruitt. Then, on second and 8 with 2:18 left, Browns coach Sam Rutigliano called a surprise pass play, but Sipe's throw was intercepted by Bobby Bryant, giving the Vikings a chance to come back.

After the interception, Kramer led the Vikings down the field, completing 4 of 5 passes for 47 yards and a touchdown to Ahmad Rashad. The drive took only 37 seconds. The Vikings still trailed by 1 point after Danmeier kicked the extra point, and had to kick off with 1:35 left.

After the Vikings failed to recover an onside kick, the Browns regained the ball at the Minnesota 44-yard line. They again tried to run out the clock, but on second down, Browns tackle Cody Risien was called for illegal motion, negating a five-yard run by Mike Pruitt and backing the Browns up five yards. This would be the difference in the success of the drive, as Pruitt was tackled by Scott Studwell a yard short of the line to gain on third down. The Browns punted with 23 seconds left, giving the Vikings one last chance.

=== The Miracle ===
After a touchback on the punt, the Vikings got the ball with 14 seconds left and no timeouts on their own 20-yard line. Vikings coach Bud Grant called a hook and lateral on the drive's first play. Kramer passed to Senser, who immediately lateraled to Ted Brown. Brown ran out of bounds after a 39-yard gain with only five seconds remaining in the game. TheVikingAge called this play the "greatest trick play in Vikings history." Things still looked bleak for the Vikings; NBC broadcaster Len Dawson predicted, "they're gonna throw that ball up in the air and hope for a miracle."

On the game's final snap, Bud Grant called the play "Squadron Right", in which three wide receivers line up on the right side of the Vikings formation and all run go routes to the end zone. Kramer dropped back and threw a Hail Mary pass to the right side into a crowd of players. The pass was tipped by Browns defensive back Thom Darden at the 5-yard line and then caught one-handed by Rashad at the 1-yard line. Rashad went into the end zone for a game-winning touchdown with no time left. Danmeier's extra point was blocked, so the final score was 28–23.

== Aftermath ==
Kramer finished with one of the best games of his career, compiling 456 passing yards, 4 touchdowns, and no interceptions. At the time, he was the only Vikings quarterback to pass for over 450 yards in a single game. (He topped this total in 1986, passing for 490 yards against the Washington Redskins.)

By winning this game, the Vikings clinched the NFC Central division title and a spot in the playoffs. As the #3 seed, they traveled to Philadelphia to face the Eagles. Despite holding a 14–7 lead at halftime, the Vikings lost 31–16, and the Eagles went on to win the NFC Championship and appear in Super Bowl XV.

The Browns overcame their loss and defeated the Cincinnati Bengals in the season's final game to win the AFC Central division, but then lost in devastating fashion to the eventual Super Bowl champion Oakland Raiders in the "Red Right 88" game.

On December 17, 2022, the Vikings came back from 33–0 down at halftime to the Indianapolis Colts to win 39–36 in overtime. Just like in 1980, the comeback win against the Colts was in Week 15, and also division clinching for the Vikings.

== See also ==
- Hail Mary pass
- Minneapolis Miracle
- 2022 Indianapolis Colts–Minnesota Vikings game
- List of nicknamed NFL games and plays
