= 1983 Cleveland Browns season =

NFL team season

- Owner: Art Modell
- Head coach: Sam Rutigliano
- Home stadium: Cleveland Municipal Stadium

Results
- Record: 9–7
- Division place: 2nd AFC Central
- Playoffs: Did not qualify
- Pro Bowlers: LB Chip Banks

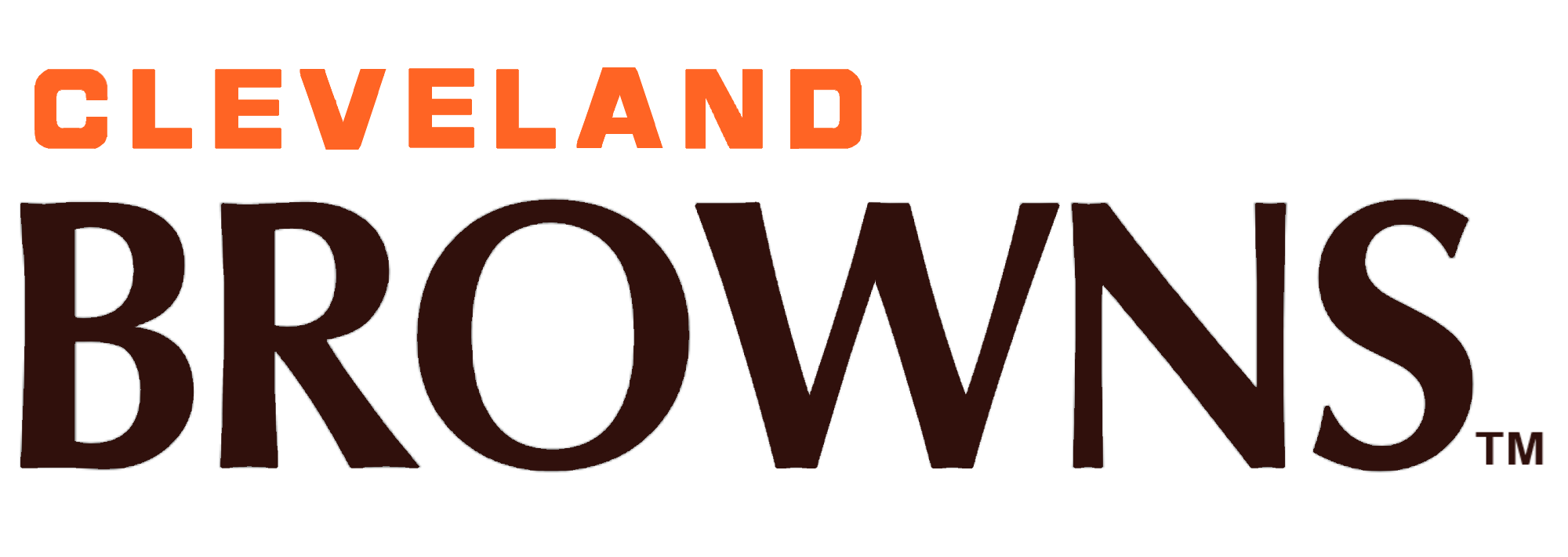
Primay script logo used by the Cleveland Browns, 1975-1995

The 1983 Cleveland Browns season was the team's 34th season with the National Football League.

== Season summary ==
In a season which was eerily similar to the 1979 campaign, which was arguably the beginning of "The Kardiac Kids" period, seven contests were decided by seven points or less, with the Browns going 4–3. Like the '79 and '80 seasons, the Browns scored often and gave up almost as many points, with the Browns scoring 356 to their opponents' 342. Quarterback Brian Sipe, in his last season with the Browns before jumping to the USFL, had 26 touchdown passes and 23 interceptions, nearly the same ratio (28-to-26) he had had in 1979. It was a good way to go out for Sipe, who had lost his starting job to Paul McDonald late in the 1982 season and then re-gained it in the '83 training camp. Fullback Mike Pruitt, in his last great season with the Browns, rushed for 1,184 yards. And finally, in his last season in Cleveland before being traded to the Denver Broncos, wide receiver Dave Logan was second on the team in receptions with 37, but that was far behind the team-record 89 hauled in by Pro Football Hall of Fame tight end Ozzie Newsome in a season that could be dubbed "The Kardiac Kids' Last Hurrah".

== Offseason ==
=== NFL draft ===
The following were selected in the 1983 NFL draft.

1983 Cleveland Browns draft
Round	Selection	Player	Position	College	Notes
2	41	Ron Brown	Wide receiver	Arizona State	
3	68	Reggie Camp	Defensive end	California	
5	122	Bill Contz	Offensive tackle	Penn State	
6	145	Tim Stracka	Tight end	Wisconsin	
6	149	Dave Puzzuoli	Nose tackle	Pittsburgh	
7	176	Rocky Belk	Wide receiver	Miami	
8	209	Mike McClearn	Guard	Temple	
10	262	Thomas Hopkins	Offensive tackle	Alabama A&M	
11	288	Boyce Green	Running back	Carson Newman College	
11	305	Howard McAdoo	Linebacker	Michigan State	
12	316	Paul Farren	Offensive tackle	Boston University	

=== Undrafted free agents ===
1983 undrafted free agents of note
Player	Position	College
Todd Campbell	Nose tackle	West Virginia

== Personnel ==
=== Staff / Coaches ===
1983 Cleveland Browns staff
Front office: President and owner – Art Modell; Assistant to the president – Peter Hadhazy; Head coaches: Head coach – Sam Rutigliano; Offensive coaches: Offensive coordinator – Larrye Weaver; Offensive Backfield Coach - Joe Scanella; Running backs – Jim Garrett; Receivers – Joe Daniels; Offensive line – Howard Mudd	Defensive coaches: Defensive coordinator – Marty Schottenheimer; Defensive line – Tom Pratt; Linebackers – Dave Adolph; Special assistant – Darvin Wallis; Special teams coaches: Special teams – John Petercuskie; Strength and conditioning: Strength and conditioning – Dave Redding; Film Coordinator - Ed Ulinski; Athletic Trainer - Leo Murphy

=== Roster ===
1983 Cleveland Browns roster
Quarterbacks: 12 Rick Trocano; 16 Paul McDonald; 17 Brian Sipe; Running backs: 25 Charles White (IR); 26 Dino Hall; 30 Boyce Green; 38 Johnny Davis; 42 Dwight Walker; 43 Mike Pruitt; Wide receivers: 80 Willis Adams; 83 Ricky Feacher; 85 Dave Logan; 88 Rocky Belk; 89 Bobby Jones; Tight ends: 81 Harry Holt; 82 Ozzie Newsome; 87 Tim Stracka	Offensive linemen: 54 Tom DeLeone C; 61 Mike Baab C; 63 Cody Risien T; 64 Joe DeLamielleure G; 68 Robert Jackson G; 70 Thomas Hopkins T; 73 Doug Dieken T; 74 Paul Farren G; 75 Bill Contz T; Defensive linemen: 72 Dave Puzzuoli NT; 79 Bob Golic NT; 94 Elvis Franks DE; 96 Reggie Camp DE; 97 Thomas Brown DE; 99 Keith Baldwin DE	Linebackers: 50 Tom Cousineau ILB; 51 Eddie Johnson ILB; 52 Dick Ambrose LB (IR); 55 Curtis Weathers OLB; 56 Chip Banks OLB; 57 Clay Matthews OLB; 58 Scott Nicolas ILB; 59 Dale Carver OLB; Defensive backs: 21 Mike Whitwell FS; 22 Clarence Scott SS; 29 Hanford Dixon CB; 31 Al Gross FS; 40 Rod Perry CB; 47 Larry Braziel CB; 48 Lawrence Johnson CB; 49 Clinton Burrell S (IR); Special teams: 7 Jeff Gossett P; 9 Matt Bahr K; 15 Steve Cox P; rookies in italics

== Regular season ==
=== Schedule ===
Week	Date	Opponent	Result	Record	Venue	Attendance	Recap
1	September 4	Minnesota Vikings	**L** 21–27	0–1	Cleveland Municipal Stadium	70,087	Recap
2	September 11	at Detroit Lions	**W** 31–26	1–1	Pontiac Silverdome	60,095	Recap
3	September 15	**Cincinnati Bengals**	**W** 17–7	2–1	Cleveland Municipal Stadium	79,700	Recap
4	September 25	at San Diego Chargers	**W** 30–24	3–1	Jack Murphy Stadium	49,482	Recap
5	October 2	Seattle Seahawks	**L** 9–24	3–2	Cleveland Municipal Stadium	75,446	Recap
6	October 9	New York Jets	**W** 10–7	4–2	Cleveland Municipal Stadium	78,235	Recap
7	October 16	at **Pittsburgh Steelers**	**L** 17–44	4–3	Three Rivers Stadium	59,263	Recap
8	October 23	at **Cincinnati Bengals**	**L** 21–28	4–4	Riverfront Stadium	50,047	Recap
9	October 30	**Houston Oilers**	**W** 25–19	5–4	Cleveland Municipal Stadium	68,851	Recap
10	November 6	at Green Bay Packers	**L** 21–35	5–5	Milwaukee County Stadium	54,089	Recap
11	November 13	Tampa Bay Buccaneers	**W** 20–0	6–5	Cleveland Municipal Stadium	56,091	Recap
12	November 20	at New England Patriots	**W** 30–0	7–5	Sullivan Stadium	40,987	Recap
13	November 27	Baltimore Colts	**W** 41–23	8–5	Cleveland Municipal Stadium	65,812	Recap
14	December 4	at Denver Broncos	**L** 6–27	8–6	Mile High Stadium	70,912	Recap
15	December 11	at **Houston Oilers**	**L** 27–34	8–7	Houston Astrodome	29,746	Recap
16	December 18	**Pittsburgh Steelers**	**W** 30–17	9–7	Cleveland Municipal Stadium	72,313	Recap
Note: Intra-division opponents are in **bold** text.

=== Game summaries ===
==== Week 2 ====
- TV Network: NBC
- Announcers: Jay Randolph and Gene Washington

Brian Sipe throws four touchdowns to lead the Browns to a 31-26 win at Detroit. Sipe becomes Cleveland's career leader, raising his TD total to 135 (surpassing Frank Ryan) with throws to Ricky Feacher, Mike Pruitt, Ozzie Newsome and Dave Logan. Pruitt also rushes for 137 yards.

==== Week 4 ====
- TV Network: NBC
- Announcers: Jay Randolph and Bob Chandler

Harry Holt, a 25-year-old NFL rookie, catches a 48-yard touchdown pass from Sipe on Cleveland's fourth play of overtime as The Browns beat The Chargers, 30-24, at San Diego. Holt catches his first NFL touchdown after Matt Bahr forces overtime with a 32-yard field goal with 18 seconds left in regulation.

==== Week 6 ====
- TV Network: NBC
- Announcers: Dick Enberg and Merlin Olsen

Linebacker Tom Cousineau records 15 tackles, one interception and one fumble recovery while leading Cleveland to a 10-7 win over the New York Jets. His interception stops a Jets drive at the Browns' 5-yard line and his fumble recovery stops New York at the Cleveland 9. The Browns' only touchdown is scored by wide receiver Bobby Jones on a 32-yard pass from Sipe.

==== Week 8 ====
- TV Network: NBC
- Announcers: Bob Costas, Bob Trumpy

The Browns lose a tough one at Cincinnati, 28-21, when Bengals' cornerback Ken Riley intercepts a Sipe pass and returns it 42 yards for a touchdown midway through the fourth quarter. Riley's 60th career interception spoils a three-TD pass performance by Sipe.

==== Week 12 ====
- TV Network: NBC
- Announcers: Phil Stone, Reggie Rucker

After going eight seasons without a shutout, the Browns made it two straight with a 30-0 rout of the Patriots at Foxboro. One week after posting a 20-0 win over Tampa Bay, Pruitt runs for 136 yards and Matt Bahr kicks three field goals. The defensive star is linebacker Chip Banks, who returns an interception 65 yards for a touchdown and records two sacks. Cousineau and Hanford Dixon each intercept two passes.

=== Standings ===
AFC Central
	W	L	T	PCT	DIV	CONF	PF	PA	STK
^{(3)} Pittsburgh Steelers	10	6	0	.625	4–2	8–4	355	303	L1
Cleveland Browns	9	7	0	.563	3–3	7–5	356	342	W1
Cincinnati Bengals	7	9	0	.438	4–2	4–8	346	302	L1
Houston Oilers	2	14	0	.125	1–5	1–11	288	460	L1

== Awards and records ==
- Brian Sipe, NFL Leader, Touchdown Passes (26), Tied with another player
