= 1980 Cincinnati Bengals season =

NFL team season

- General manager: Paul Brown
- Head coach: Forrest Gregg
- Home stadium: Riverfront Stadium

Results
- Record: 6–10
- Division place: 4th AFC Central
- Playoffs: Did not qualify

The 1980 Cincinnati Bengals season was the franchise's 10th season in the National Football League, and the 13th overall. The Bengals went 6–10 and managed only 244 points, lowest in the AFC. They did upset defending Super Bowl champion Pittsburgh twice. First-round draft choice Anthony Muñoz began his Hall of Fame career. This was the final season the Bengals wore the Cleveland Browns style uniforms.

== Offseason ==
=== NFL draft ===
1980 Cincinnati Bengals draft
| Round | Pick | Player | Position | College | Notes |
| 1 | 3 | Anthony Muñoz * ^{†} | Offensive tackle | USC | |
| 2 | 31 | Kirby Criswell | Linebacker | Kansas | |
| 3 | 59 | Rod Horn | Defensive tackle | Nebraska | |
| 4 | 86 | Billy Glass | Guard | Baylor | |
| 5 | 113 | Bryan Hicks | Defensive back | McNeese State | |
| 6 | 141 | Jo Jo Heath | Defensive back | Pittsburgh | |
| 6 | 159 | Andrew Melontree | Linebacker | Baylor | |
| 7 | 167 | Ron Simpkins | Linebacker | Michigan | |
| 7 | 168 | Gary Don Johnson | Defensive tackle | Baylor | |
| 8 | 196 | Mark Lyles | Running back | Florida State | |
| 9 | 224 | Greg Bright | Defensive back | Morehead State | |
| 10 | 252 | Sandro Vitiello | Placekicker | Massachusetts | |
| 11 | 281 | Alton Alexis | Wide receiver | Tulane | |
| 12 | 308 | Mike Wright | Quarterback | Vanderbilt | |
Made roster † Pro Football Hall of Fame * Made at least one Pro Bowl during career

=== Undrafted free agents ===
1980 undrafted free agents of note
| Player | Position | College |
|---|---|---|
| Mike Chronister | Wide receiver | BYU |
| Greg Donahue | Linebacker | New Hampshire |
| Ken Ebeling | Linebacker | Colgate |
| Steve Gannon | Linebacker | Holy Cross |
| Franklin King | Defensive linemen | Kansas |

== Personnel ==
=== Staff / Coaches ===
1980 Cincinnati Bengals staff
| Front office: President – John Sawyer; General manager – Paul Brown; Director of player personnel – Pete Brown; Head coaches: Head coach – Forrest Gregg; Offensive coaches: Quarterbacks/Receivers – Lindy Infante; Offensive Backfield – George Sefcik; Tight Ends – Frank Gansz; Offensive Line – Jim McNally | Defensive coaches: Defensive Coordinator/Linebackers – Hank Bullough; Defensive Line – Dick Modzelewski; Defensive Backfield – Dick LeBeau; Special teams coaches: Special Teams – Frank Gansz; Strength and conditioning: Strength – Kim Wood |

=== Roster ===
1980 Cincinnati Bengals roster
| Quarterbacks (QB): 14 Ken Anderson; 15 Turk Schonert; 12 Jack Thompson; Running backs (RB): 40 Charles Alexander; 45 Archie Griffin; 46 Pete Johnson; 35 Nathan Poole; 22 Deacon Turner; Wide receivers (WR): 82 Alton Alexis; 85 Isaac Curtis; 86 Steve Kreider; 28 Cleo Montgomery HB /WR; Tight ends (TE): 83 M. L. Harris; 89 Dan Ross | Offensive linemen (OL): 74 Glenn Bujnoch G; 58 Blair Bush C; 64 William Glass G; 62 Dave Lapham T/G; 65 Max Montoya G; 60 Blake Moore C; 78 Anthony Muñoz T; 77 Mike Wilson T; Defensive linemen (DL): 79 Ross Browner DE; 73 Eddie Edwards DE; 71 Rod Horn NT; 72 Mike St. Clair DE; 63 Mike White DE; 75 Wilson Whitley NT | Linebackers (LB): 50 Glenn Cameron ILB; 52 Tom Dinkel OLB; 53 Bo Harris OLB; 55 Jim LeClair ILB; 59 Andrew Melontree OLB; 56 Ron Simpkins ILB; 57 Reggie Williams OLB; Defensive backs (DB): 34 Louis Breeden CB; 47 Greg Bright SS; 24 Clarence Chapman CB; 44 Ray Griffin CB; 36 Jo Jo Heath CB; 27 Bryan Hicks FS; 13 Ken Riley CB; 23 Shafer Suggs SS; Special teams (ST): 10 Jim Breech K; 87 Pat McInally WR /P | Practice squad: None - Vacant; Reserve: 84 Don Bass WR (IR); 67 Gary Burley DE (IR); 81 Jim Corbett TE (IR); 30 Dick Jauron S (IR); 61 Howard Kurnick LB (NF-Inj.); 88 Mike Levenseller WR (IR); 51 Rick Razzano LB (IR); Rookies in italics 45 active, 7 reserve, 0 practice squad |

== Regular season ==
=== Schedule ===
| Week | Date | Opponent | Result | Record | Venue | Attendance |
|---|---|---|---|---|---|---|
| 1 | September 7 | Tampa Bay Buccaneers | **L** 12–17 | 0–1 | Riverfront Stadium | 43,211 |
| 2 | September 14 | at Miami Dolphins | **L** 16–17 | 0–2 | Miami Orange Bowl | 38,322 |
| 3 | September 21 | **Pittsburgh Steelers** | **W** 30–28 | 1–2 | Riverfront Stadium | 52,490 |
| 4 | September 28 | **Houston Oilers** | **L** 10–13 | 1–3 | Riverfront Stadium | 50,413 |
| 5 | October 5 | at Green Bay Packers | **L** 9–14 | 1–4 | Lambeau Field | 55,006 |
| 6 | October 12 | at **Pittsburgh Steelers** | **W** 17–16 | 2–4 | Three Rivers Stadium | 53,668 |
| 7 | October 19 | Minnesota Vikings | **W** 14–0 | 3–4 | Riverfront Stadium | 44,487 |
| 8 | October 26 | at **Houston Oilers** | **L** 3–23 | 3–5 | Astrodome | 49,189 |
| 9 | November 2 | San Diego Chargers | **L** 14–31 | 3–6 | Riverfront Stadium | 46,406 |
| 10 | November 9 | at Oakland Raiders | **L** 17–28 | 3–7 | Oakland-Alameda County Coliseum | 44,132 |
| 11 | November 16 | Buffalo Bills | **L** 0–14 | 3–8 | Riverfront Stadium | 40,836 |
| 12 | November 23 | at **Cleveland Browns** | **L** 7–31 | 3–9 | Cleveland Municipal Stadium | 79,253 |
| 13 | November 30 | at Kansas City Chiefs | **W** 20–6 | 4–9 | Arrowhead Stadium | 41,594 |
| 14 | December 7 | Baltimore Colts | **W** 34–33 | 5–9 | Riverfront Stadium | 35,651 |
| 15 | December 14 | at Chicago Bears | **W** 17–14 | 6–9 | Soldier Field | 48,808 |
| 16 | December 21 | **Cleveland Browns** | **L** 24–27 | 6–10 | Riverfront Stadium | 50,058 |
Note: Intra-division opponents are in **bold** text.

=== Week 1 ===
| Team | 1 | 2 | 3 | 4 | Total |
|---|---|---|---|---|---|
| • Buccaneers | 0 | 10 | 0 | 7 | 17 |
| Bengals | 3 | 0 | 2 | 7 | 12 |

- Date: September 7
- Location: Riverfront Stadium
- Referee: Fred Wyant
- TV announcers (CBS): Curt Gowdy and Hank Stram

=== Week 2 ===
| Team | 1 | 2 | 3 | 4 | Total |
|---|---|---|---|---|---|
| Bengals | 0 | 7 | 7 | 2 | 16 |
| • Dolphins | 0 | 0 | 0 | 17 | 17 |

- Date: September 14
- Location: Orange Bowl

=== Week 3 ===
| Team | 1 | 2 | 3 | 4 | Total |
|---|---|---|---|---|---|
| Steelers | 0 | 14 | 7 | 7 | 28 |
| • Bengals | 10 | 3 | 0 | 17 | 30 |

- Date: September 21
- Location: Riverfront Stadium
- TV announcers (NBC): Don Criqui and John Brodie

Scoring summary
| Q1 | CIN | R. Griffin 28 yard interception return (Sunter kick) | CIN 7–0 |
| Q1 | CIN | Sunter 27 yard field goal | CIN 10–0 |
| Q2 | PIT | Smith 45 yard pass from Bradshaw (Bahr kick) | CIN 10–7 |
| Q2 | PIT | Swann 14 yard pass from Bradshaw (Bahr kick) | PIT 14–10 |

=== Week 16 ===
| Team | 1 | 2 | 3 | 4 | Total |
|---|---|---|---|---|---|
| • Browns | 0 | 10 | 14 | 3 | 27 |
| Bengals | 3 | 7 | 14 | 0 | 24 |

- Date: December 21
- Location: Riverfront Stadium
- Referee: Jerry Markbreit
- TV announcers (NBC): Dick Enberg and Merlin Olsen

=== Standings ===
AFC Central
| | W | L | T | PCT | DIV | CONF | PF | PA | STK |
|---|---|---|---|---|---|---|---|---|---|
| ^{(2)} Cleveland Browns | 11 | 5 | 0 | .688 | 4–2 | 8–4 | 357 | 310 | W1 |
| ^{(5)} Houston Oilers | 11 | 5 | 0 | .688 | 4–2 | 7–5 | 295 | 251 | W3 |
| Pittsburgh Steelers | 9 | 7 | 0 | .563 | 2–4 | 5–7 | 352 | 313 | L1 |
| Cincinnati Bengals | 6 | 10 | 0 | .375 | 2–4 | 4–8 | 244 | 312 | L1 |
