= 1980 Houston Oilers season =

NFL team season

- Owner: Bud Adams
- General manager: Bum Phillips
- Head coach: Bum Phillips
- Defensive coordinator: Ed Biles
- Home stadium: Houston Astrodome

Results
- Record: 11–5
- Division place: 2nd AFC Central
- Playoffs: Lost Wild Card Playoffs (at Raiders) 7–27

The 1980 Houston Oilers season was the franchise's 21st overall and the 11th in the National Football League (NFL). The team scored 295 points while the defense gave up 251 points. Their record of 11 wins and 5 losses resulted in a second-place finish in the AFC Central Division. The Oilers appeared twice on Monday Night Football. In their first appearance on Monday Night Football, the Oilers beat the Cleveland Browns 16–7. In their second appearance, the Oilers defeated the New England Patriots 38–34. Earl Campbell led the NFL in rushing for the third consecutive year and had four 200-yard rushing games.

This was the third season in a row that the Oilers made the playoffs. The team lost in the AFC Wild Card Round to the eventual Super Bowl champions, the Oakland Raiders. The Oilers would not make it back to the playoffs again until 1987.

The last remaining active member of the 1980 Houston Oilers was defensive lineman Mike Stensrud, who retired after the 1989 season.

Third-year fullback Earl Campbell had the best season of his career. He rushed for 1,934 yards and scored 13 touchdowns. The Oilers' average team member age in 1980 was 27.7, making this the oldest Houston Oiler team assembled at the time.

== Offseason ==
=== NFL draft ===
1980 Houston Oilers draft
Round	Pick	Player	Position	College	Notes
2	38	Angelo Fields	Tackle	Michigan State	
2	52	Daryle Skaugstad	Defensive tackle	California	
3	79	Tim Smith	Wide receiver	Nebraska	
4	106	Chris Combs	Tight end	New Mexico	
5	134	John Corker	Linebacker	Oklahoma State	
7	182	Craig Bradshaw	Quarterback	Utah State	
8	217	Harold Bailey	Wide receiver	Oklahoma State	
9	244	Ed Harris	Running back	Bishop	
11	301	Ed Preston	Wide receiver	Western Kentucky	
12	328	Wiley Pitts	Wide receiver	Temple	
Made roster

== Personnel ==
=== Staff ===
1980 Houston Oilers staff
Front office: President – Bud Adams; General manager – Bum Phillips; Senior Vice President/Chief Administrative Officer – Ladd Herzeg; Assistant General Manager – Pat Peppler; Director of College Scouting – Joe Woolley; Head coaches: Head coach – Bum Phillips; Offensive coaches: Quarterbacks/Receivers – King Hill; Offensive Backs – Andy Bourgeois; Offensive Line – Joe Bugel	Defensive coaches: Defensive Coordinator – Ed Biles; Defensive Line – Wade Phillips; Linebackers – John Paul Young; Defensive Secondary – Bob Gambold; Special teams coaches: Special Teams – John Paul Young

=== Roster ===
1980 Houston Oilers roster
Quarterbacks (QB): 14 Gifford Nielsen; 12 Ken Stabler; Running backs (RB): 39 Adger Armstrong; 34 Earl Campbell; 26 Rob Carpenter; 42 Boobie Clark; 47 Ronnie Coleman; 45 Tim Wilson; Wide receivers (WR): 81 Jeff Groth; 84 Billy Johnson; 82 Mike Renfro; 85 Carl Roaches; 83 Tim Smith; Tight ends (TE): 86 Mike Barber; 87 Dave Casper; 88 Rich Caster	Offensive linemen (OL): 58 David Carter G/C; 66 Greg Davidson C; 77 Angelo Fields T; 60 Ed Fisher G; 70 Conway Hayman T; 55 Carl Mauck C; 76 Morris Towns T; 63 Bob Young G; Defensive linemen (DL): 75 Jesse Baker DE; 65 Elvin Bethea DE; 69 Andy Dorris DE; 71 Ken Kennard NT; 67 Mike Stensrud DE	Linebackers (LB): 54 Gregg Bingham ILB; 52 Robert Brazile OLB; 57 John Corker OLB; 53 Thomas Henderson OLB; 50 Daryl Hunt ILB; 51 Ted Thompson ILB; 59 Ted Washington OLB; Defensive backs (DB): 36 Carter Hartwig CB; 32 Vernon Perry SS; 37 Mike Reinfeldt FS; 27 Greg Stemrick CB; 28 Jack Tatum FS; 33 J. C. Wilson CB; Special teams (ST): 16 Toni Fritsch K; 5 Chester Marcol K; 18 Cliff Parsley P	Reserve: 11 Harold Bailey WR (IR); 10 Craig Bradshaw QB (IR); 00 Ken Burrough WR (IR); 74 Leon Gray T (IR); 21 Charles Jefferson CB (IR); 61 Darryl Payne G (IR); 64 George Reihner G (IR); 62 John Schuhmacher G (IR); 90 Daryle Skaugstad NT (IR); 56 Art Stringer ILB (IR); 79 Randy Young T (IR); Rookies in italics

== Regular season ==
=== Earl Campbell ===
- In 1980, Earl Campbell had four 200-yard rushing games.

Date	Opponent	Attempts	Yards	Touchdowns
October 19	Tampa Bay Buccaneers	33	203	0
October 26	Cincinnati Bengals	27	202	2
November 16	Chicago Bears	31	206	0
December 21	Minnesota Vikings	29	203	1

=== Schedule ===
Week	Date	Opponent	Result	Record	Venue	Recap
1	September 7	at Pittsburgh Steelers	**L** 17–31	0–1	Three Rivers Stadium	Recap
2	September 15	at Cleveland Browns	**W** 16–7	1–1	Cleveland Municipal Stadium	Recap
3	September 21	Baltimore Colts	**W** 21–16	2–1	Astrodome	Recap
4	September 28	at Cincinnati Bengals	**W** 13–10	3–1	Riverfront Stadium	Recap
5	October 5	Seattle Seahawks	**L** 7–26	3–2	Astrodome	Recap
6	October 12	at Kansas City Chiefs	**L** 20–21	3–3	Arrowhead Stadium	Recap
7	October 19	Tampa Bay Buccaneers	**W** 20–14	4–3	Astrodome	Recap
8	October 26	Cincinnati Bengals	**W** 23–3	5–3	Astrodome	Recap
9	November 2	at Denver Broncos	**W** 20–16	6–3	Mile High Stadium	Recap
10	November 10	New England Patriots	**W** 38–34	7–3	Astrodome	Recap
11	November 16	at Chicago Bears	**W** 10–6	8–3	Soldier Field	Recap
12	November 23	at New York Jets	**L** 28–31	8–4	Shea Stadium	Recap
13	November 30	Cleveland Browns	**L** 14–17	8–5	Astrodome	Recap
14	December 4	Pittsburgh Steelers	**W** 6–0	9–5	Astrodome	Recap
15	December 14	at Green Bay Packers	**W** 22–3	10–5	Lambeau Field	Recap
16	December 21	Minnesota Vikings	**W** 20–16	11–5	Astrodome	Recap
Note: Intra-division opponents are in **bold** text.

=== Standings ===
AFC Central
	W	L	T	PCT	DIV	CONF	PF	PA	STK
^{(2)} Cleveland Browns	11	5	0	.688	4–2	8–4	357	310	W1
^{(5)} Houston Oilers	11	5	0	.688	4–2	7–5	295	251	W3
Pittsburgh Steelers	9	7	0	.563	2–4	5–7	352	313	L1
Cincinnati Bengals	6	10	0	.375	2–4	4–8	244	312	L1

== Postseason ==
=== AFC Wild Card ===
Oakland Raiders 27, Houston Oilers 7

Quarter	1	2	3	4	Total
Oilers	7	0	0	0	7
Raiders	3	7	0	17	27

at Oakland Coliseum, Oakland, California

- Game time: 5:00 p.m. EST
- Game weather: 58 °F or 14.4 °C, sunny
- Game attendance: 52,762
- Referee: Chuck Heberling
- TV announcers (NBC): Charlie Jones and Len Dawson

Even though the Oilers recorded more yards, more first downs, and more time of possession, the Raiders scored on big plays to win, 27–7.

In the first of his two seasons with the Oilers, this would be Kenny "Snake" Stabler's final playoff game.

== Awards and records ==
- Earl Campbell, NFL Rushing Leader, (1,934)
- Earl Campbell, All-Pro selection 1980
- Earl Campbell, Pro Bowl selection 1980
- Earl Campbell, NEA NFL MVP (1980)
- Earl Campbell, NFL Offensive Player of the Year (1980)

=== Milestones ===
- Earl Campbell, 3rd 1,000-yard rushing season
- Earl Campbell, 3rd NFL Rushing Title
- Earl Campbell, Four 200-yard rushing games (Oct 19, Oct 26, Nov., 16, Dec. 21)
