= Larry Collins =

Larry or Lawrence Collins may refer to:

- Larry Collins (American football) (born 1955), American football player
- Larry Collins (writer) (1929–2005), author of several historical books, mainly in collaboration with Dominique Lapierre
- Larry Collins (guitarist) (1944–2024), member of The Collins Kids, a juvenile rockabilly duo
- Lorence G. Collins (born 1931), American petrologist
- Lawrence Collins, Baron Collins of Mapesbury (born 1941), British judge and former Justice of the Supreme Court of the United Kingdom
