= 1980 Cleveland Browns season =

35th season in franchise history, nicknamed the "Kardiac Kids"

- Owner: Art Modell
- Head coach: Sam Rutigliano
- Defensive coordinator: Marty Schottenheimer
- Home stadium: Cleveland Municipal Stadium

Results
- Record: 11–5
- Division place: 1st AFC Central
- Playoffs: Lost Divisional Playoffs (vs. Raiders) 12–14
- Pro Bowlers: C Tom DeLeone; LT Doug Dieken; FB Mike Pruitt; RG Joe DeLamielleure; QB Brian Sipe

The 1980 Cleveland Browns season was the team's 35th overall, and 31st season in the National Football League. The Browns finished the regular season with eleven wins and five losses, and their first division title since 1971, winning a tiebreaker with the Houston Oilers. The 1980 Browns were known as the Kardiac Kids for having several games decided in the final moments. The 1980 season was the first time that Cleveland had qualified for the postseason since 1972. Also, for the second straight year, Browns head coach Sam Rutigliano was named NFL Coach of the Year, and quarterback Brian Sipe was named the league's Most Valuable Player.

Rallying from a 10–0 first-half deficit against Cincinnati, the Browns came back to beat the Bengals 27–24 and finally snare the Central championship when Don Cockroft kicked the game-winning 22-yard field goal with 1:25 left. The Bengals tried to come back and got as far as the Cleveland 14-yard line before time ran out.

The Browns played their first home playoff game in nine seasons against the Raiders, in what has become known as the Red Right 88 game. The Browns marched to the Oakland 13 in the waning seconds trailing by 14–12, but Brian Sipe's pass into the end zone for Hall of Fame tight end Ozzie Newsome was intercepted, ending Cleveland's season.

Five players had 50 or more receptions, led by running back Mike Pruitt. Pruitt also rushed for 1,034 yards and six touchdowns. Running back Calvin Hill, recorded six touchdowns among his 27 catches. Wide receiver Ricky Feacher grabbed just 10 passes, but four went for scores, including two within a matter of minutes in the division-clinching win over the Bengals.

== Offseason ==
=== NFL draft ===
1980 Cleveland Browns draft
Round	Pick	Player	Position	College	Notes
1	27	Charles White *	Running back	USC	
2	54	Cleveland Crosby	Defensive end	Arizona	
3	72	Cliff Odom	Linebacker	Texas–Arlington	
4	99	Ron Crews	Defensive tackle	UNLV	
4	109	Paul McDonald	Quarterback	USC	
5	116	Elvis Franks	Defensive end	Morgan State	
8	209	Jeff Copeland	Linebacker	Texas Tech	
9	236	Roy Dewalt	Running back	Texas–Arlington	
10	263	Kevin Fidel	Center	San Diego State	
11	294	Roland Sales	Running back	Arkansas	
12	321	Marcus Jackson	Defensive end	Purdue	
Made roster * Made at least one Pro Bowl during career

=== Undrafted free agents ===
1980 undrafted free agents of note
Player	Position	College
Rick Donaldson	Linebacker	Penn State

== Personnel ==
=== Staff / Coaches ===
1980 Cleveland Browns staff
Front office: President and owner – Art Modell; Assistant to the president – Peter Hadhazy; Head coaches: Head coach – Sam Rutigliano; Offensive coaches: Quarterbacks – Jim Shofner; Running backs – Jim Garrett; Receivers – Rich Kotite; Offensive line – Rod Humenuik	Defensive coaches: Defensive coordinator – Marty Schottenheimer; Defensive line – Tom Pratt; Linebackers – Dave Adolph; Defensive Backs - Len Fontes; Special teams coaches: Special teams – John Petercuskie; Strength and conditioning: Strength and conditioning – Dave Redding; Director of Pro Personnel - Allan Webb; Film Coordinator - Ed Ulinski; Athletic Trainer - Leo Murphy

=== Roster ===
1980 Cleveland Browns roster
Quarterbacks: 16 Paul McDonald; 17 Brian Sipe; Running backs: 25 Charles White; 26 Dino Hall; 30 Cleo Miller; 34 Greg Pruitt; 35 Calvin Hill; 43 Mike Pruitt; Wide receivers: 33 Reggie Rucker; 80 Willis Adams; 83 Ricky Feacher; 85 Dave Logan; 89 Keith Wright; Tight ends: 82 Ozzie Newsome; 84 McDonald Oden; 87 Curtis Weathers	Offensive linemen: 54 Tom DeLeone C; 63 Cody Risien T; 64 Joe DeLamielleure G; 65 Henry Sheppard G; 68 Robert Jackson G; 69 Joel Patten T; 73 Doug Dieken T; 79 Gerry Sullivan T/C; Defensive linemen: 77 Lyle Alzado DE; 90 Marshall Harris DE; 91 Henry Bradley NT; 93 Ron Crews NT; 94 Elvis Franks DE	Linebackers: 50 Don Goode OLB; 52 Dick Ambrose ILB; 53 Bill Cowher ILB; 55 John Mohring OLB; 56 Robert Jackson ILB; 57 Clay Matthews OLB; 59 Charlie Hall OLB; Defensive backs: 20 Judson Flint CB; 21 Oliver Davis CB; 22 Clarence Scott SS; 24 Autry Beamon SS; 27 Thom Darden FS; 28 Ron Bolton CB; 49 Clinton Burrell CB; Special teams: 8 Johnny Evans P; 12 Don Cockroft K	Reserve lists: 48 Lawrence Johnson CB (IR); 58 Cliff Odom LB (IR); 71 Matt Miller T (IR); 72 Jerry Sherk DE (IR); 96 Marcus Jackson NT (IR); rookies in italics

== Regular season ==
=== Schedule ===
Week	Date	Opponent	Result	Record	Venue	Attendance	Recap
1	September 7	at New England Patriots	**L** 17–34	0–1	Schaefer Stadium	49,222	Recap
2	September 15	**Houston Oilers**	**L** 7–16	0–2	Cleveland Municipal Stadium	80,243	Recap
3	September 21	Kansas City Chiefs	**W** 20–13	1–2	Cleveland Municipal Stadium	63,614	Recap
4	September 28	at Tampa Bay Buccaneers	**W** 34–27	2–2	Tampa Stadium	65,540	Recap
5	October 5	Denver Broncos	**L** 16–19	2–3	Cleveland Municipal Stadium	81,065	Recap
6	October 12	at Seattle Seahawks	**W** 27–3	3–3	Kingdome	61,366	Recap
7	October 19	Green Bay Packers	**W** 26–21	4–3	Cleveland Municipal Stadium	75,548	Recap
8	October 26	**Pittsburgh Steelers**	**W** 27–26	5–3	Cleveland Municipal Stadium	79,095	Recap
9	November 3	Chicago Bears	**W** 27–21	6–3	Cleveland Municipal Stadium	84,225	Recap
10	November 9	at Baltimore Colts	**W** 28–27	7–3	Memorial Stadium	45,369	Recap
11	November 16	at **Pittsburgh Steelers**	**L** 13–16	7–4	Three Rivers Stadium	54,563	Recap
12	November 23	**Cincinnati Bengals**	**W** 31–7	8–4	Cleveland Municipal Stadium	79,253	Recap
13	November 30	at **Houston Oilers**	**W** 17–14	9–4	Houston Astrodome	51,514	Recap
14	December 7	New York Jets	**W** 17–14	10–4	Cleveland Municipal Stadium	78,454	Recap
15	December 14	at Minnesota Vikings	**L** 23–28	10–5	Metropolitan Stadium	42,202	Recap
16	December 21	at **Cincinnati Bengals**	**W** 27–24	11–5	Riverfront Stadium	50,058	Recap
Note: Intra–division opponents are in **bold** text.

=== Game summaries ===
==== Week 3 ====
Team	1	2	3	4	Total
Chiefs	0	6	7	0	13
• Browns	0	7	13	0	20

- Date: September 21
- Location: Cleveland Municipal Stadium, Cleveland, OH
- Game start: 1:00 p.m. EST
- Game weather: 76 °F (24 °C); wind 17 mph (27 km/h)
- Referee: Jim Tunney

Scoring summary
Q1	KC	Lowery 38-yard field goal	KC 3–0
Q1	KC	Lowery 22-yard field goal	KC 6–0
Q1	CLE	White 2-yard run (Cockroft kick)	CLE 7–6
Q3	CLE	Wright 12-yard pass from Sipe (kick failed)	CLE 13–6
Q3	KC	Samuels 16-yard pass from Fuller (Lowery kick)	Tie 13–13
Q3	CLE	White 31-yard pass from Sipe (Cockroft kick)	CLE 20–13

- Charles White 7 Rec, 100 Yds

==== Week 7 vs. Green Bay Packers ====
- The Browns rallied from down 21–13 in the fourth quarter, first on Ozzie Newsome’s touchdown catch from Brian Sipe, then facing third and 20 from the Packers' 46-yard line with 16 seconds left Sipe completed a pass to Dave Logan for the winning touchdown. **Browns 26, Packers 21**

==== Week 8 vs. Pittsburgh Steelers ====
- Sipe and company erased three two–score deficits — 10–0, 20–7, and 26–14 — to defeat the Steelers in Cleveland. Ozzie Newsome hauled in the winning catch with 5:35 to play. **Browns 27, Steelers 26**

==== Week 9 vs. Chicago Bears ====
- Although Mike Pruitt's 56-yard touchdown run ultimately wins the game for Cleveland, Sipe throws for 298 yards and reaches a milestone in Browns history, becoming the Browns' all-time passing leader in NFL play. **Browns 27, Bears 21**

==== Week 10 at Baltimore Colts ====
- A missed PAT by the Colts proved the difference in a 28–27 Browns win as both teams combined for eight touchdowns. Bert Jones had three scores for the Colts but was sacked five times.

==== Week 11 at Pittsburgh Steelers ====
- Seeking their first ever win at Pittsburgh's Three Rivers Stadium, the Browns once again were denied, this time on a Terry Bradshaw to Lynn Swann touchdown with eleven seconds left. It was the Browns' 11th consecutive defeat at Pittsburgh. **Steelers 16, Browns 13**

==== Week 13 at Houston Oilers ====
- The Browns edged the Oilers 17–14 in what had become a de facto three-way tie atop the AFC Central. The Browns were out gained in yardage by 126 but five Oilers turnovers were the key.

==== Week 14 vs. New York Jets ====
- Once again the Cardiac Browns had to rally, this time down 14–10 in the fourth, this time on a five-yard Greg Pruitt touchdown catch.

==== Week 15 at Minnesota Vikings ====
- In a game known to Vikings fans as the "Miracle at the Met", the Browns relinquish a 23–9 lead with only 7:15 remaining. The game is probably most remembered for Browns Safety Thom Darden's deflection of Tommy Kramer's "Hail Mary pass", which is caught by Ahmad Rashad as time expires. Kramer's 456 passing yards were the most ever given up by the Browns. **Vikings 28, Browns 23**

==== Week 16 at Cincinnati Bengals ====
- Needing a win to secure the Central Division title, the Browns rallied against the Bengals 27–24. The game lead tied or changed six times as Don Cockroft's game-winning field goal came with 1:25 left to play. **Browns 27, Bengals 24**

=== Standings ===
AFC Central
	W	L	T	PCT	DIV	CONF	PF	PA	STK
^{(2)} Cleveland Browns	11	5	0	.688	4–2	8–4	357	310	W1
^{(5)} Houston Oilers	11	5	0	.688	4–2	7–5	295	251	W3
Pittsburgh Steelers	9	7	0	.563	2–4	5–7	352	313	L1
Cincinnati Bengals	6	10	0	.375	2–4	4–8	244	312	L1

== Son of the Kardiac Kids ==
The 2007 Cleveland Browns had a season similar to the Kardiac Kids, with several games being decided in the final minutes or in overtime. One game in particular against the Baltimore Ravens, which the Browns won in overtime because of a reversed call on a field goal by kicker Phil Dawson, led the Cleveland Plain Dealer to publish an editorial calling the 2007 Browns "The 'Son of the Kardiac Kids'" . The similarities have been at least acknowledged by the organization, with offensive coordinator Rob Chudzinski being quoted in the article calling his team "The Kardiac Kids' little brother."

== Postseason ==
Round	Date	Opponent (seed)	Result	Record	Venue	Recap
Divisional	January 4, 1981	Oakland Raiders (4)	L 12–14	0–1	Cleveland Municipal Stadium	Recap

=== AFC Divisional Playoff ===
- Oakland Raiders 14, Cleveland Browns 12

	1	2	3	4	Total
Raiders	0	7	0	7	14
Browns	0	6	6	0	12

at Cleveland Stadium, Cleveland, Ohio

- TV: NBC
- Attendance: 77,655

== Red Right 88 ==
AFC Divisional Playoff Game (Home) January 4, 1981 – Browns 12, Oakland Raiders 14 In American football, Red Right 88 is the name given to a passing play called by the Cleveland Browns during a National Football League (NFL) playoff game against the Oakland Raiders on January 4, 1981. In the years since the term has been used to refer to both the play itself and the game. The Red Right 88 game was a divisional playoff game played as part of the 1980–81 NFL playoffs, which would crown the NFL champion for the 1980 season. Under the playoff structure in place at the time, five teams from each of the NFL's two conferences – the American Football Conference (AFC) and National Football Conference (NFC) – would qualify for the playoffs. These five teams would consist of the champions of each of the three divisions of each conference (the East, Central, and West), plus two wild card teams, which were the two teams who finished with the best win-loss record in each conference and were not division champions. These five teams would be seeded one through five based on win-loss record for purposes of playoff bracketing, with the three division champions seeded one through three and the two wild card qualifiers seeded four and five.

The Browns had finished in first place in the AFC Central division during the 1980 season with an 11–5 win-loss record. Although the Houston Oilers had also compiled an 11–5 record during the 1980 season, Cleveland claimed the AFC Central championship by having a better record than Houston against other AFC opponents (the Browns had an 8–4 conference record, compared to the 7–5 conference record of the Oilers). Like the Browns, the Raiders had also finished the 1980 season with an 11–5 record. However, they finished in second place in the AFC West division behind the San Diego Chargers, who also had an 11–5 win-loss record. San Diego had been awarded the division title over Oakland because they had scored more net points against division opponents (60) than Oakland (37) during the season.

As the Browns, Raiders, Chargers, Oilers, and AFC East division champion Buffalo Bills all finished with identical 11–5 records, the league was forced to resort to tiebreakers to determine seeding for the playoff tournament. San Diego attained the first overall seed in the AFC because they had a better record against other AFC opponents than Cleveland and Buffalo (9–3 for San Diego compared to 8–4 for both Cleveland and Buffalo). The Browns, however, were named the second seed over the Bills because they had a better record against common opponents (5–2) than the Bills (5–3). As the Raiders and Oilers had both finished with the best second-place records in the AFC, they both qualified for the playoffs as wild-card teams; the Raiders were named the fourth seed as they had a better record against AFC opponents (9–3) than the Oilers (7–5).

The playoff system stipulated that the top seed in each conference would get a bye into the second round of the playoffs (the divisional playoff), while the two wild card teams would play each other in the first round of the playoffs (the wild card playoff). The victor of the wild card playoff would then face the top conference seed in the divisional playoff unless the wild card victor and top conference seed were in the same division, in which case the wild card victor would play the second seed.

In the AFC wild-card playoff on December 28, 1980, the Raiders defeated the Oilers 27–7 to move on to the divisional playoff, where under normal circumstances they would have played the Chargers, who were the top AFC seed. However, as the Raiders and Chargers were both in the AFC West, the Raiders would instead play the Browns, the second seed in the AFC, in the divisional playoff. With the game-time temperature at 4 °F (−16 °C), the coldest National Football League game since the Ice Bowl of December 31, 1967, the first quarter contained nothing but punts and interceptions, with Cleveland's Ron Bolton and Oakland's Lester Hayes each recording one of the latter. Near the end of the quarter, Browns quarterback Brian Sipe's 20-yard completion to Reggie Rucker sparked a drive that reached inside the Raiders' 30-yard line, but it ended with no points early in the second quarter when Don Cockroft missed a field goal attempt from 47 yards. On Oakland's ensuing drive, quarterback Jim Plunkett lost a fumble while being sacked, but their defense kept the Browns in check and Cockroft missed another field goal attempt, this one from 30 yards out.

With 6:02 left in the second quarter, Bolton scored the first points of the day by recording his second interception of Plunkett and returning it 42 yards to the end zone. However, Cockroft's ensuing extra point was blocked by Ted Hendricks. After an exchange of punts, Oakland managed to get on the scoreboard, with Plunkett completing passes to Bob Chandler and Raymond Chester for gains of 15 and 26 yards highlighting a 64-yard scoring drive. Mark van Eeghen finished the drive with a 1-yard touchdown run with 18 seconds left in the half, making the score 7–6.

On Cleveland's opening drive of the second half, a 28-yard kickoff return to the 40-yard line by Charles White started a 48-yard drive that ended with Cockroft's 30-yard field goal, giving the lead back to the Browns, 9–7. After forcing a punt, Cleveland drove to the Raiders' 24-yard line, but on a field goal attempt, holder Paul McDonald was unable to handle a bad snap and was tackled for an 11-yard loss. On their next drive on the Raiders' 44-yard line after a punt, Cleveland drove to the 9-yard line, featuring a 21-yard reception by Dave Logan. The drive ended with another 30-yard field goal by Cockroft, making the score 12–7 going into the fourth quarter.[1]

Early in the final quarter, the Raiders took a 14–12 lead with an 80-yard drive highlighted by Chester's 27-yard catch. On the last play, van Eeghen scored his second 1-yard touchdown run of the day. The Raiders had a chance to put the game away when they recovered a fumble from Sipe on the Browns' 24-yard line with 4:19 left in the game. But on 3rd down with 1 yard to go at the Browns' 15-yard line, van Eeghen was stuffed for no gain on two consecutive plays, and Cleveland regained the ball on downs. On the second play of the ensuing drive, Sipe completed a 29-yard pass to tight end Ozzie Newsome, and four plays later connected on a 23-yard pass to Greg Pruitt. Then Mike Pruitt ran the ball 14 yards to the Raiders' 14-yard line. Pruitt gained another yard on the next play, and the team called a timeout with 49 seconds left. Trailing 14–12 with less than a minute remaining in the game, the Browns had the ball on the Raiders' 13-yard line and were in position to kick a potential game-winning field goal. Sipe conferred with head coach Sam Rutigliano, who called a pass play, "Red Slot Right, Halfback Stay, 88," and instructed Sipe to "throw it into Lake Erie" (throwing the ball out of play as it was only 2nd down), if the play was anything less than wide open.[2] On the next play, Sipe forced a pass to tight end Ozzie Newsome. However, it was intercepted in the end zone by Raiders safety Mike Davis, who had cut in front of Newsome's square-out pass route, putting an end to the Browns' season. The Raiders subsequently advanced to the AFC conference championship, where they defeated the San Diego Chargers, 34–27, and went on to win Super Bowl XV over the Philadelphia Eagles, 27–10.[3]

The logic behind trying for the touchdown was that Cockroft, the Browns' placekicker, had previously missed two field goal attempts, had one extra point attempt blocked, and had another aborted following a bad snap. In addition, the weather was brutally cold and windy. "What many people don't know about that situation is that I was a long way from being 100 percent physically in 1980," Cockroft said in a 2006 interview. "I had two herniated discs and needed four epidurals to just get through the season. I probably should have gone on IR [the injured reserve list]."[4] Cockroft was released by the Browns at the end of their 1981 training camp and retired soon after. In an NFL Films retrospective on the game, one of Mike Davis' teammates laughed over the play because Davis (an outstanding tackler and team leader) had notoriously poor hands and had often dropped potential interceptions during his career, only for Davis to make the biggest stop of his career by making a difficult catch during freezing, windy weather when it mattered the most.

Had the play been executed properly, it may have resulted in a touchdown. The primary receiver, Dave Logan, was crossing left-to-right, had a step on his defender, and was open at the 6-yard line. Sipe misread the defensive back's movements and thought Logan was covered so he threw to the secondary receiver and it was intercepted. Furthermore, this drive had occurred right after the Raiders also eschewed a short field goal attempt, choosing to run the ball on 3rd and 4th down at the Browns' 15-yard line only to get stuffed for no gain each time.

The play call itself has since become an infamous part of Cleveland sports lore, ranking with The Drive, The Fumble, The Catch [from 1954 World Series], Game 7 of the 1997 World Series, The Shot, The Decision, and The Move as a bad memory that symbolizes the 52-year professional championship drought that plagued the city until the Cleveland Cavaliers won the 2016 NBA Finals.

== Awards and records ==
- Brian Sipe, NFL MVP
- Brian Sipe, PFWA MVP
- Brian Sipe, UPI AFL-AFC Offensive Player of the Year
- Brian Sipe, AFC Leader, Touchdown Passes (30), Tied with another player
- Sam Rutigliano, UPI NFL Coach of the Year
