= Hernando High School =

Hernando High School may refer to:

- Hernando High School (Florida) in Brooksville, Florida, part of the Hernando County School District
- Hernando High School (Mississippi), in Hernando, Mississippi, part of the DeSoto County School District
