= Craig Bradshaw =

Craig Bradshaw may refer to:

- Craig Bradshaw (basketball) (born 1983), New Zealand professional basketball player
- Craig Bradshaw (American football) (born 1957), American football player
