= Pat Dennis =

American football player (born 1978)

No. 41, 28, 22
- Position: Cornerback

Personal information
- Born: June 30, 1978 (age 48); Shreveport, Louisiana, U.S.
- Listed height: 6 ft 2 in (1.88 m)
- Listed weight: 200 lb (91 kg)

Career information
- High school: Southwood (Shreveport)
- College: Louisiana-Monroe
- NFL draft: 2000: 5th round, 162nd overall pick

Career history
- Kansas City Chiefs (2000–2001); Dallas Cowboys (2001); Houston Texans (2002–2003); Washington Redskins (2004)

Awards and highlights
- PFWA All-Rookie Team (2000); All-Independent (1999); All-Louisiana (1999)

Career NFL statistics
- Games played: 41
- Interceptions: 1
- Fumble recoveries: 2
- Stats at Pro Football Reference

Patrick A. Dennis (born June 30, 1978) is an American former professional football player who was a cornerback in the National Football League (NFL) for the Kansas City Chiefs, Dallas Cowboys, Houston Texans, and Washington Redskins. He played college football at the University of Louisiana at Monroe.

== Early life ==
Dennis was born in Shreveport, Louisiana, where he attended Southwood High School; he played for the school as a quarterback and defensive back. As a junior, he earned honorable-mention All-state honors at defensive back. As a senior, he received All-state and All-district honors at quarterback.

== College career ==
He accepted a football scholarship from the University of Louisiana at Monroe, where he was a three-year starter at cornerback. As a freshman, he registered 65 tackles (3 for loss), 3 interceptions, 8 passes defensed and one sack.

The next year, he led the nation with 7 interceptions (school record), while tallying 18 passes defensed (school record), 75 tackles and 2 interceptions returned for touchdowns. As a junior, he made 40 tackles, 3 interceptions (tied for the team lead) and 10 passes defensed (led the team).

He declared for the NFL draft after his junior season, finishing his college career with 180 tackles, 13 interceptions (tied for third all-time) and 36 passes defensed (school record).

== Professional career ==
=== Kansas City Chiefs ===
Dennis was selected by the Kansas City Chiefs in the fifth round (162nd overall) of the 2000 NFL draft. As a rookie, he started the final 13 games at left cornerback in place of an injured James Hasty, while registering 70 tackles, 7 passes defensed, 2 fumble recoveries, one forced fumble, one interception and 10 special teams tackles.

In 2001, he suffered a sprained medial collateral ligament in his right knee during the third pre-season game against the Jacksonville Jaguars. On September 2, he was placed on the injured reserve list. He was waived injured on October 2.

=== Dallas Cowboys ===
On October 3, 2001, Dennis was claimed off waivers by the Dallas Cowboys. He appeared in 11 games in the team's nickel defense after recovering from his right knee injury, posting 14 tackles, 8 passes defensed and 8 special teams tackles. He was released on September 1, 2002.

=== Houston Texans ===
On September 2, 2002, he was claimed off waivers by the Houston Texans, becoming a part of the franchise inaugural season. He suffered a torn ACL in the sixth game of the year against the Cleveland Browns. On October 22, he was placed on the injured reserve list, finishing with 5 special teams tackles and one defensive tackle.

On June 18, 2003, he had to undergo a second knee surgery on the same knee he tore the ACL. On August 26, he was placed on the injured reserve list. He was released April 27, 2004.

=== Washington Redskins ===
On October 13, 2004, he was signed as a free agent by the Washington Redskins after safety Matt Bowen was lost for the season. He wasn't re-signed at the end of the year.

== NFL career statistics ==
Legend
**Bold**	Career high

Year	Team	Games		Tackles					Interceptions					Fumbles			
Year	Team	GP	GS	Cmb	Solo	Ast	Sck	TFL	Int	Yds	TD	Lng	PD	FF	FR	Yds	TD
2000	KAN	**16**	**13**	**72**	**65**	**7**	0.0	**3**	**1**	0	0	0	**7**	**1**	**2**	-5	0
2001	DAL	11	0	22	20	2	0.0	0	0	0	0	0	6	0	0	0	0
2002	HOU	3	0	3	2	1	0.0	0	0	0	0	0	0	0	0	0	0
2004	WAS	11	0	8	8	0	0.0	0	0	0	0	0	0	0	0	0	0
		41	13	105	95	10	0.0	3	1	0	0	0	13	1	2	-5	0
