= Ron Battle =

American football player (born 1959)

No. 81
- Position: Tight end

Personal information
- Born: March 27, 1959 (age 67); Shreveport, Louisiana, U.S.
- Listed height: 6 ft 3 in (1.91 m)
- Listed weight: 220 lb (100 kg)

Career information
- High school: Southwood (Shreveport)
- College: North Texas
- NFL draft: 1981: 7th round, 175th overall pick

Career history
- Los Angeles Rams (1981–1982); Tampa Bay Buccaneers (1983)*
- * Offseason or practice squad member only

Career NFL statistics
- Receptions: 2
- Receiving yards: 62
- Receiving touchdowns: 1
- Stats at Pro Football Reference

Ronnie Jerome Battle (born March 27, 1959) is an American former professional football player who was a tight end for two seasons with the Los Angeles Rams of the National Football League (NFL). He played college football for the North Texas Mean Green and was selected by the Rams in the seventh round of the 1981 NFL draft.

He is the father of NFL wide receiver Arnaz Battle.

== Early life ==
Battle attended Southwood High School in Shreveport, Louisiana. He played college football for the North Texas Mean Green.

== Professional career ==
=== Los Angeles Rams ===
Battle was drafted by the Los Angeles Rams in the seventh round (175th overall) of the 1981 NFL draft. He appeared in four games as a rookie but did not record any statistics.

In 1982, Battle played in nine games for the Rams. He finished the season with two receptions for 62 yards and a touchdown. He also carried the ball once for one yard.

He left the NFL and professional football after the 1982 season due to a career ending thumb injury.
