= Mason Alexander Hargrave =

African-American activist

Mason Alexander Hargrave (March 20, 1923 – December 12, 1988) was an organizer in the African-American community. He spent his later years in Cleveland, Ohio, in a leadership role at the United Negro Improvement Association (UNIA). He was involved in promoting use of the red, black, and green Pan-African flag and had it flown over Cleveland City Hall in 1974. He was an acolyte of Marcus Garvey and wrote a letter of "testimony" to U.S. Representative John Conyers in 1987 objecting to mail fraud charges against Garvey.

He succeeded Vernon Wilson as President-General of the UNIA. Cleo Miller succeeded him as head of the UNIA in 1988. Some of Hargrave's UNIA related papers are part of the Robert A. Hill collection at Duke University. A book of Marcus Garvey and UNIA papers is dedicated to Hargrave and notes his work preserving documents at the organization.
