= 1973 All-Atlantic Coast Conference football team =

American college football all-star team

The 1973 All-Atlantic Coast Conference football team consists of American football players chosen by the Atlantic Coast Sports Writers Association (ACS) as the best at each position in Atlantic Coast Conference ("ACC") during the 1973 NCAA Division I football season.

== All-Atlantic Coast Conference selections ==
=== Offensive selections ===
==== Wide receivers ====
- Harrison Davis, Virginia (ACS [wide receiver])

==== Tight ends ====
- Charles Waddell, North Carolina (ACS [tight end])

==== Offensive tackles ====
- Rick Druschel, NC State (ACS)
- Robert Pratt, North Carolina (ACS)

==== Offensive guards ====
- Bill Yoest, NC State (ACS)
- Ken Peeples, Clemson (ACS)

==== Centers ====
- Paul Ryczek, Virginia (ACS)

==== Quarterbacks ====
- Ken Pengitore, Clemson (ACS)

==== Backs ====
- Willie Burden, NC State (ACS)
- Sammy Johnson, North Carolina (ACS)
- Louis Carter, Maryland (ACS)

=== Defensive selections ===
==== Linemen ====
- Paul Vellano, Maryland (ACS)
- Randy White, Maryland (ACS)
- John Ricca, Duke (ACS)
- Ernie Clark, Duke (ACS)

==== Linebackers ====
- Dick Ambrose, Virginia (ACS)
- Keith Stoneback, Duke (ACS)
- Jimmy DeRatt, North Carolina (ACS)

==== Defensive backs ====
- Bob Smith, Maryland (ACS)
- Mike Stultz, NC State (ACS)
- Peanut Martin, Clemson (ACS)
- Bobby Pilz, NC State (ACS)

=== Special teams ===
==== Kickers ====
- Chuck Ramsey, Wake Forest (ACS)

== Key ==
ACS = Atlantic Coast Sports Writers Association

== See also ==
- 1973 College Football All-America Team
