= Southwood High School =

Location
- Shreveport, Louisiana; United States; 32.4087°N 93.8164°W

Information
- Type: High school
- Founded: 1971
- School district: Caddo Parish Schools
- Enrollment: 1,058 (2023-2024)
- Colors: Orange and blue
- Mascot: Cowboy
- Nickname: Cowboys
- Website: southwood.caddoschools.org

Southwood High School is a senior high school in Shreveport, Louisiana, United States. It is a part of Caddo Parish Schools. The school's colors are orange and blue. The school mascot is a cowboy.

== History ==
Caddo Parish, the parish which governs the city of Shreveport, contacted George Peabody College in 1949 to survey the city's school system and recommend ways to improve it. The following year, the survey was completed, and recommended the construction of a new high school in southwestern Shreveport within the following 15 years. In 1967, the city consulted Peabody to conduct another survey, which found that their initial predictions of growth in southwest Shreveport were correct, and again called for the construction of a new high school in the area. Between these two surveys, there was considerable economic growth in the area due to an increase in manufacturing, and the federal government began enforcing the integration of schools, making the project for a new high school more feasible.

The city government began planning a new school, and construction began on May 13, 1969. The school was slated to open in September 1970, but a 60-day strike and the defaulting of subcontractors delayed the projected opening to January 1971. Classes at Southwood were held on the campus of Woodlawn High School, using a half-day schedule to accommodate both schools. Construction on the Southwood campus was completed on May 24, 1971, and the school opened that fall.

In the spring of 1970, the school board held a contest in which people submitted names for the new school. The name Southwood High School was chosen due to the wooded area the school was located in, and due to the presence of a school to the north of Shreveport called Northwood High School.

== Safety ==
The school attracted national attention following a number of high-profile fights which broke out in September 2021. Over the span of three days, 23 students were arrested. Following these incidents, a group of about 40 fathers of Southwood High School Students began patrolling the school, preventing fights from occurring, while also providing emotional support for students.

== Athletics ==
Southwood High athletics competes in the LHSAA.

== Notable alumni ==
- Michael Aubrey, first-round MLB draft pick of the Cleveland Indians
- Alana Beard, WNBA guard/forward
- Ron Battle, NFL tight end
- Craig Bradshaw, NFL quarterback
- Pat Dennis, NFL cornerback
- Stan Humphries, NFL quarterback
