= Arnaz Battle =

American football player (born 1980)

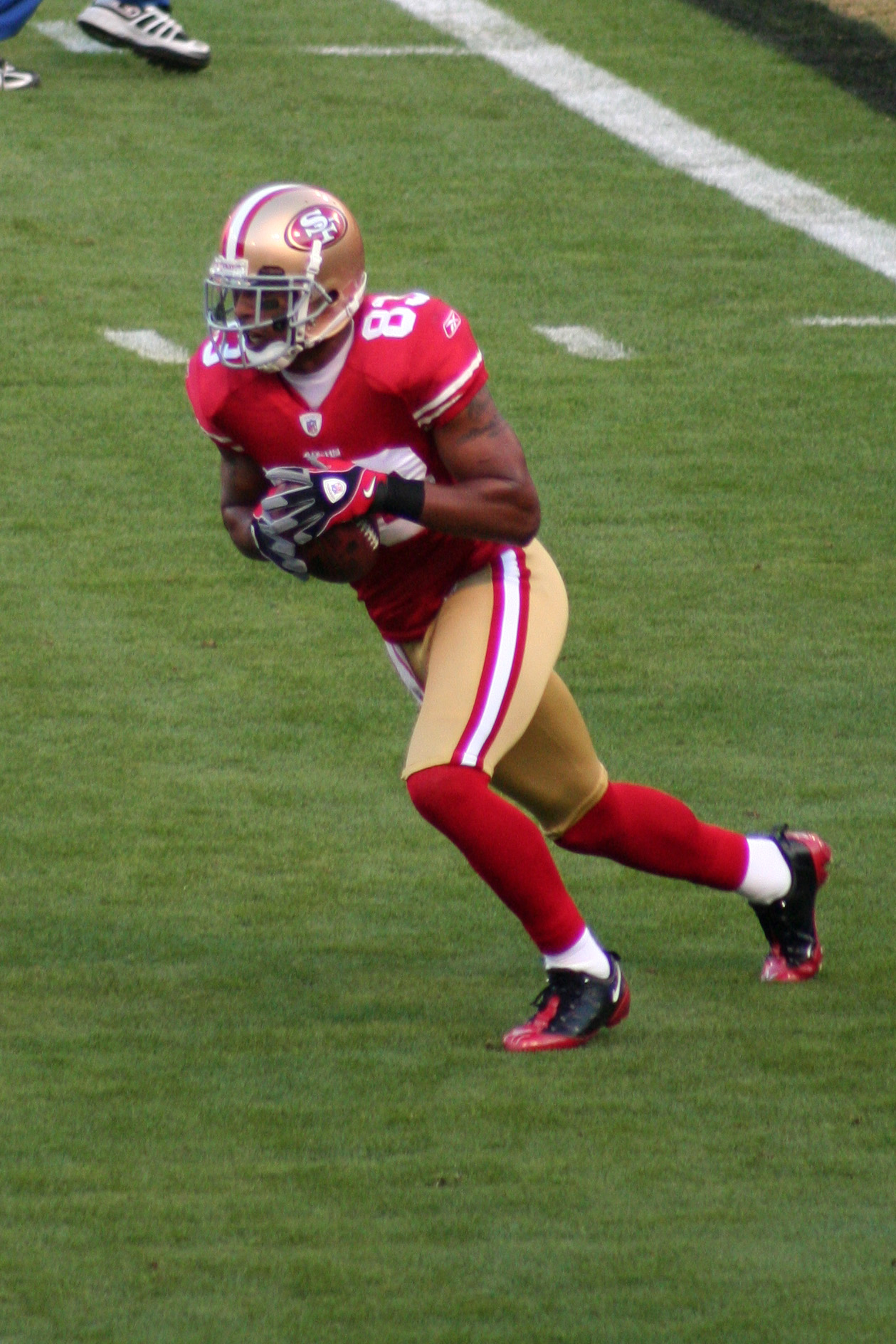
- Battle with the San Francisco 49ers in 2009

No. 83, 81
- Position: Wide receiver

Personal information
- Born: February 22, 1980 (age 46); Shreveport, Louisiana, U.S.
- Listed height: 6 ft 1 in (1.85 m)
- Listed weight: 208 lb (94 kg)

Career information
- High school: C. E. Byrd (Shreveport)
- College: Notre Dame
- NFL draft: 2003: 6th round, 197th overall pick

Career history
- San Francisco 49ers (2003–2009); Pittsburgh Steelers (2010–2011)

Career NFL statistics
- Receptions: 178
- Receiving yards: 2,150
- Rushing attempts: 22
- Rushing yards: 77
- Return yards: 887
- Total touchdowns: 13
- Stats at Pro Football Reference

Arnaz Jerome Battle (born February 22, 1980) is an American former professional football player who was a wide receiver in the National Football League (NFL). He played college football for the Notre Dame Fighting Irish and was selected by the San Francisco 49ers in the sixth round of the 2003 NFL draft. Battle also played for the Pittsburgh Steelers. He is the son of former NFL tight end Ron Battle.

== Early life ==
When Arnaz was nine years old, Brandon, his younger brother died in a tragic drowning accident. On his upper left arm appears a tattoo of his late brother's face. He prepped at C. E. Byrd High School, where he finished with 5,137 total yards and rushed for 49 career touchdowns while throwing for 28 more and scored one touchdown on a kickoff return. He was a Parade All-America selection and was rated 39th-best player nationally by The Sporting News and 52nd-best player by Chicago Sun-Times. A USA Today honorable mention All-America and third-team All-South quarterback by Fox Sports South.

== College career ==
Battle played quarterback for the University of Notre Dame in his first two seasons, and was named the starting quarterback in 2000. However, against No.1 Nebraska in the second game of the year, Battle suffered a broken wrist on the first play from scrimmage and was forced to sit out the remainder of the season. The following year, he was converted to wide receiver, because of his great speed and running ability. He tallied 53 receptions for 742 yards (14.0 avg.) and five touchdowns, adding 314 yards and one touchdown on 62 carries in career. He was an All-America honorable mention and All-Independent first-team selection by The NFL Draft Report, following his senior season at the University of Notre Dame. He saw time at quarterback and completed 30-of-69 passes for 438 yards and two touchdowns. He added academic honors, while maintaining a 3.2 grade point average and majored in sociology and computer applications.

== Professional career ==
Pre-draft measurables
Height	Weight	Arm length	Hand span	40-yard dash	10-yard split	20-yard split	20-yard shuttle	Three-cone drill	Vertical jump	Broad jump
6 ft 0 5/8 in (1.84 m)	217 lb (98 kg)	30 3/4 in (0.78 m)	9 in (0.23 m)	4.57 s	1.63 s	2.74 s	4.06 s	6.74 s	35.0 in (0.89 m)	9 ft 9 in (2.97 m)
All values from NFL Combine

=== San Francisco 49ers ===
In 2003, he saw action in eight games and recorded two carries for 14 yards to go along with eight tackles and two fumble recoveries on special teams before finishing season on injured reserve with left toe injury.

In 2004, he saw action in 14 games and registered career-highs in punt returns (31), punt return yards (266), kickoff returns (13), kickoff return yards (257) and special teams tackles (16). He was Inactive for the final two contests of the season with a thigh injury. He returned a career-long 71-yard punt return for a touchdown vs. the Arizona Cardinals.

In 2005, he played in 10 games with eight starts and tallied 32 receptions for 363 yards with three touchdowns. He was inactive for six contests due to a knee injury. He led the team in receiving with five receptions for 59 yards and recorded his first career touchdown on a six-yard pass from quarterback Tim Rattay vs. the St. Louis Rams. He also completed his first career pass on a 24-yard connection to WR Brandon Lloyd followed by his second career completion later in quarter with a three-yard shovel pass to RB Frank Gore.

In 2006, he played in 16 games with 15 starts and ranked second on the team with career-highs of 59 receptions and 686 receiving yards. He was the only receiver in the NFL with 40 or more catches and no dropped passes. He caught four passes for 37 yards and two tough, short-yardage touchdowns vs. the Oakland Raiders, marking his first career multi-touchdown receiving game. He also hauled in five receptions for 97 yards against the Seattle Seahawks, and added one carry for a career-long 18 yards.

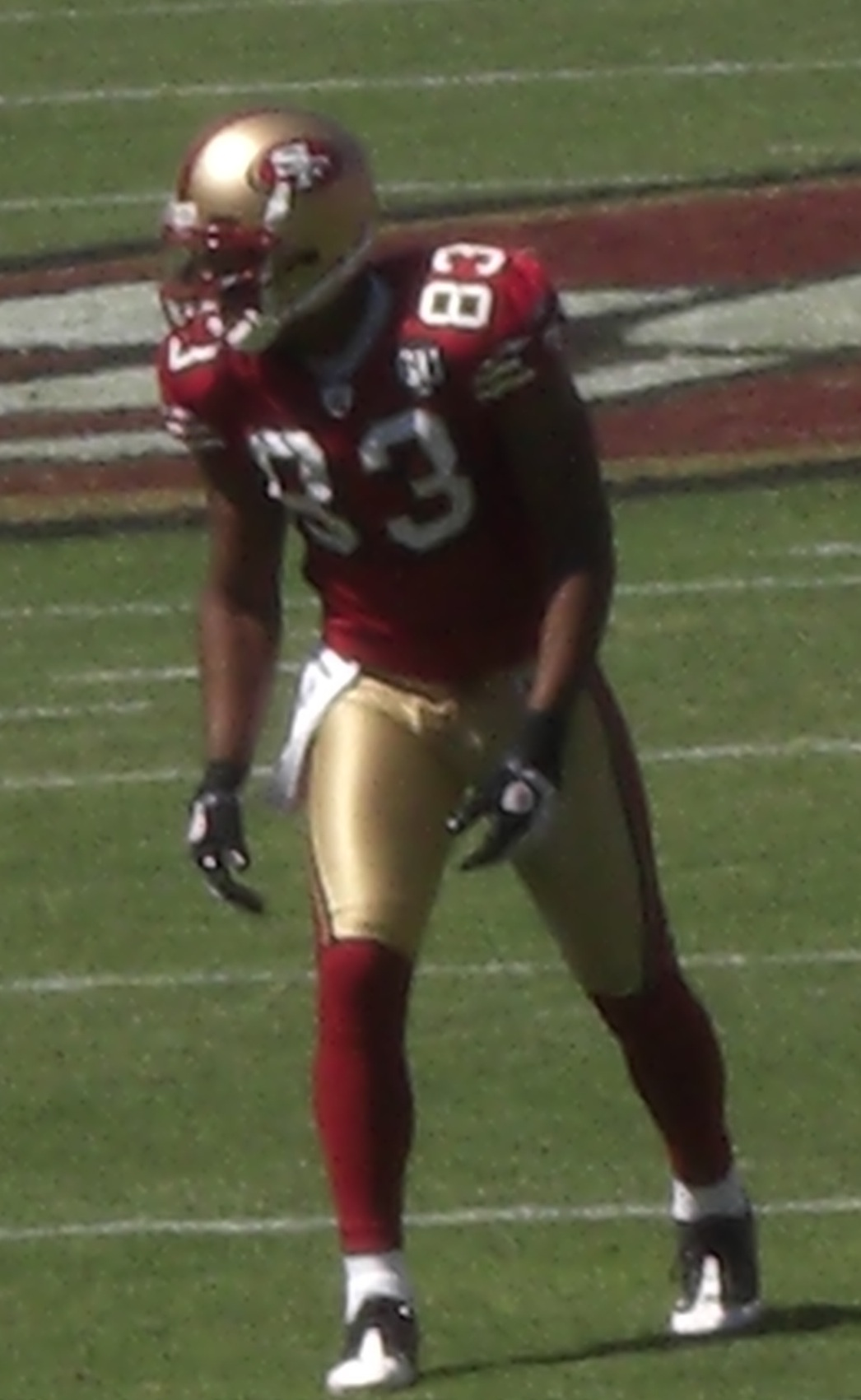
Battle with the 49ers in 2008

In 2007, he played in 16 games with 15 starts, posting 50 catches for a team-high 600 yards while setting career-highs in touchdown receptions (five) and total touchdowns (six). He was also named as the captain of all of the wide receivers. In the season opener on Monday Night Football against Arizona, he caught a team-high five receptions for 60 yards, while also scoring the go-ahead score on his first career rushing touchdown, a one-yard end around with 22 seconds remaining to give the 49ers a 20–17 victory. He caught a 57-yard touchdown at Arizona, the 49ers' longest play from scrimmage in 2007. It marked the second longest reception of his career behind a 65-yarder he had from Tim Rattay vs. the Dallas Cowboys. He played, but did not start due to an ankle injury suffered against the Minnesota Vikings and caught two passes for 13 yards with one touchdown. His touchdown catch came in the third quarter on QB Shaun Hill's first career touchdown pass.

Battle logged his first 100-yard game with a 120-yard performance during Week 4 of the 2008 season. He was placed on season-ending injured reserve with a foot injury on December 13, 2008. He finished the 2008 season with 24 catches for 318 yards.

In 2009 finished with 5 catches for 40 yards and help in Special Teams.

=== Pittsburgh Steelers ===
On March 8, 2010, Battle signed a three-year contract with the Pittsburgh Steelers worth $3.975 million with $975,000 to sign; He did not have a reception during his first season, but was a standout on special teams. The next year, he was named team captain for special teams. The Steelers released Battle on February 8, 2012.

== NFL career statistics ==
Legend
**Bold**	Career high

Year	Team	Games		Receiving					
Year	Team	GP	GS	Tgt	Rec	Yds	Avg	Lng	TD
2003	SFO	8	0	1	0	0	0.0	0	0
2004	SFO	14	0	15	8	143	**17.9**	**65**	0
2005	SFO	10	8	54	32	363	11.3	39	3
2006	SFO	**16**	**15**	85	**59**	**686**	11.6	56	3
2007	SFO	**16**	**15**	**104**	50	600	12.0	57	**5**
2008	SFO	9	0	42	24	318	13.3	36	0
2009	SFO	15	0	5	5	40	8.0	12	0
2010	PIT	15	0	2	0	0	0.0	0	0
2011	PIT	10	0	1	0	0	0.0	0	0
		113	38	309	178	2,150	12.1	65	11

== Personal life ==
His father, Ron Battle, played football at North Texas and then as a tight end for two seasons with the Los Angeles Rams. He is married to Billye Battle and has four children.
