= Cleo Miller =

American football player (born 1951)

No. 30, 31
- Position: Running back

Personal information
- Born: September 5, 1951 (age 75); Gould, Arkansas, U.S.
- Listed height: 5 ft 11 in (1.80 m)
- Listed weight: 207 lb (94 kg)

Career information
- High school: Merrill (Pine Bluff, Arkansas)
- College: Arkansas–Pine Bluff
- NFL draft: 1974: undrafted

Career history
- Kansas City Chiefs (1974–1975); Cleveland Browns (1975–1982); Michigan Panthers (1983-1984)

Career NFL statistics
- Rushing attempts: 593
- Rushing yards: 2,492
- Rushing touchdowns: 16
- Receptions: 140
- Receiving yards: 1,175
- Receiving touchdowns: 1
- Stats at Pro Football Reference

Cleophus Miller (born September 5, 1951) is a President-General of the Universal Negro Improvement Association and a former professional American football running back who played nine seasons for the Kansas City Chiefs and Cleveland Browns. He is the uncle of NFL defensive lineman Frank Okam of the Houston Texans.

== NFL career ==
Miller, who played collegiately at the University of Arkansas at Pine Bluff, signed a free agent contract with the Kansas City Chiefs after not being taken in the 1974 NFL draft. Miller played well as rookie, rushing for 186 yards on 40 carries (4.7 avg.) and catching 14 passes for 149 yards (10.6 avg.)

Midway through his second season, Miller was traded to the Cleveland Browns, and finished the 1975 season with only 13 carries. Miller earned a starting role in Browns' backfield for the 1976 season, a job he would hold through 1979. In 1976 Miller ran for 613 yards and four touchdowns (4.0 avg.) as a fullback blocking for All-Pro running back Greg Pruitt. The Browns finished the season with a record of 9-5, but failed to make the playoffs despite ranking 9th in the league in rushing.

In 1977, Miller had the best season of his career. He rushed for 756 yards on 163 carries, career-highs in both categories, and scored four touchdowns. He also set a career-high with 41 receptions. The Browns were 8th in the league in rushing yards and had the 3rd best yards per carry (4.3), but they only managed a 6-8 record.

After starting nine games and rushing for 336 yards in 1978, Miller was relegated to a back-up role for the remainder of his career. In 1980, the Browns won the AFC Central Division with an 11-5 record behind the efforts of All-Pros Mike Pruitt, Ozzie Newsome and Brian Sipe, who was also named league MVP. Miller contributed in a reserve role, rushing for 139 yards on 28 carries (5.0 avg.) and one touchdown. Nicknamed the Kardiac Kids the Browns lost in the divisional round of the playoffs to the eventual Super Bowl champion Oakland Raiders 14-12. Miller appeared in the game, carrying the ball only one time for one yard.

In Miller's final NFL season he appeared in only five games during the strike-shortened 1982 season. He finished his NFL career with 2,492 yards rushing (4.2 avg.) and 16 touchdowns. Miller also caught 140 passes for 1,175 yards and one touchdown. He is eleventh in Browns history in rushing yards and thirteenth in rushing touchdowns.

== USFL career ==
In 1983, Miller signed a free-agent contract with the Michigan Panthers of the United States Football League. Playing as a fullback, Miller ran for 374 yards and helped the Panthers win the 1983 USFL championship. In 1984 Miller played on a Panthers team that finished with a 10-8 record. They made the playoffs, where they lost to the Los Angeles Express 37-31 in triple overtime, and Miller retired after the season. He later served as Director of Operations for the Spring Football League in 1999-2000, and was inducted into the Southwestern Athletic Conference Hall of Fame in 2002.

== NFL career statistics ==
Legend
**Bold**	Career high

=== Regular season ===
Year	Team	Games		Rushing					Receiving				
Year	Team	GP	GS	Att	Yds	Avg	Lng	TD	Rec	Yds	Avg	Lng	TD
1974	KAN	14	2	40	186	4.7	47	0	14	149	**10.6**	34	0
1975	KAN	6	0	7	20	2.9	10	0	0	0	0.0	0	0
1975	CLE	5	0	6	3	0.5	6	1	2	20	10.0	10	0
1976	CLE	12	12	153	613	4.0	21	**4**	16	145	9.1	**38**	0
1977	CLE	14	**14**	**163**	**756**	4.6	38	**4**	**41**	**291**	7.1	28	**1**
1978	CLE	15	9	89	336	3.8	18	1	20	152	7.6	23	0
1979	CLE	**16**	3	39	213	**5.5**	39	1	26	251	9.7	33	0
1980	CLE	**16**	0	28	139	5.0	**50**	3	2	8	4.0	7	0
1981	CLE	12	2	52	165	3.2	13	2	16	139	8.7	17	0
1982	CLE	5	0	16	61	3.8	17	0	3	20	6.7	11	0
		115	42	593	2,492	4.2	50	16	140	1,175	8.4	38	1

=== Playoffs ===
Year	Team	Games		Rushing					Receiving				
Year	Team	GP	GS	Att	Yds	Avg	Lng	TD	Rec	Yds	Avg	Lng	TD
1980	CLE	**1**	0	**1**	**1**	**1.0**	**1**	0	0	0	0.0	0	0
1982	CLE	**1**	0	0	0	0.0	0	0	0	0	0.0	0	0
		2	0	1	1	1.0	1	0	0	0	0.0	0	0

== Personal life ==
In 1988 Miller succeeded Mason Hargrave as President-General of the Universal Negro Improvement Association founded by Marcus Garvey. He and former Browns teammate Robert Jackson served as honorary captains for the Browns game against the Pittsburgh Steelers on January 1, 2012.

== See also ==
- USFL
- National Football League team captains
