= Sammy Johnson (running back) =

American football player (born 1952)

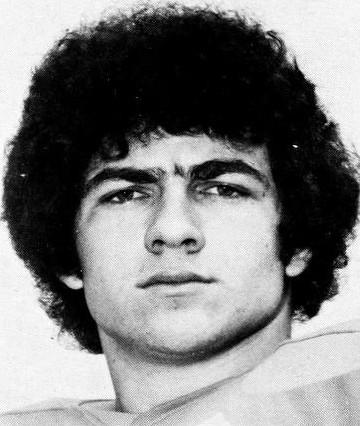

No. 48, 39
- Position: Running back

Personal information
- Born: September 22, 1952 (age 74); Burlington, North Carolina, U.S.
- Listed height: 6 ft 0 in (1.83 m)
- Listed weight: 233 lb (106 kg)

Career information
- High school: Central (High Point, North Carolina)
- College: North Carolina
- NFL draft: 1974: 4th round, 90th overall pick

Career history
- San Francisco 49ers (1974–1976); Minnesota Vikings (1976–1978); Green Bay Packers (1979)

Awards and highlights
- First-team All-ACC (1973)

Career NFL statistics
- Rushing attempts: 206
- Rushing yards: 830
- Rushing TDs: 9
- Stats at Pro Football Reference

Sammy Johnson (September 22, 1952) is an American former professional football player who was a running back for six seasons in the National Football League (NFL) for the San Francisco 49ers, Minnesota Vikings, and Green Bay Packers. He played college football for the North Carolina Tar Heels.
