= Jesse Turnbow =

American football player (1956–2018)

No. 71
- Position: Defensive tackle

Personal information
- Born: October 8, 1956; Cincinnati, Ohio, U.S.
- Died: November 27, 2018 (aged 62); Cincinnati, Ohio, U.S.
- Listed height: 6 ft 7 in (2.01 m)
- Listed weight: 272 lb (123 kg)

Career information
- High school: Cincinnati (OH) Princeton
- College: Tennessee
- NFL draft: 1978: 8th round, 205th overall pick

Career history
- Cleveland Browns (1978)
- Stats at Pro Football Reference

Jesse Turnbow (October 8, 1956 – November 27, 2018) was an American football defensive tackle. He played college football at the University of Tennessee. He was drafted 205th overall in the eighth round and played for the Cleveland Browns in 1978. He played in all 16 games in the 1978 season.

He died on November 27, 2018, in Cincinnati, Ohio at age 62.
