= Daryle Skaugstad =

American football player (born 1957)

No. 90, 91, 78
- Position: Nose tackle

Personal information
- Born: April 8, 1957 (age 69); Seattle, Washington, U.S.
- Listed height: 6 ft 5 in (1.96 m)
- Listed weight: 254 lb (115 kg)

Career information
- High school: Des Moines (WA) Mount Rainier
- College: California
- NFL draft: 1980: 2nd round, 52nd overall pick

Career history
- Houston Oilers (1981–1982); San Francisco 49ers (1983); Green Bay Packers (1983); New Orleans Saints (1984)*
- * Offseason or practice squad member only

Career NFL statistics
- Sacks: 3.5
- Fumble recoveries: 2
- Stats at Pro Football Reference

Daryle Skaugstad (born April 8, 1957), is an American former professional football player who was a nose tackle in the National Football League (NFL). He played college football for the California Golden Bears. Skaugstad was selected in the second round of the 1980 NFL draft by the Houston Oilers and later played two seasons with the team. He would split the 1983 NFL season between the San Francisco 49ers and the Green Bay Packers.
