= Harold Bailey (gridiron football) =

American football player (born 1957)

No. 11, 80, 20
- Position: Wide receiver

Personal information
- Born: April 12, 1957 (age 69); Houston, Texas, U.S.
- Listed height: 6 ft 2 in (1.88 m)
- Listed weight: 195 lb (88 kg)

Career information
- High school: Yates (Houston)
- College: Oklahoma State (1976–1979)
- NFL draft: 1980: 8th round, 217th overall pick

Career history
- Houston Oilers (1980–1982); Montreal Concordes (1984)

Career NFL statistics
- Receptions: 26
- Receiving yards: 367
- Rushing yards: 13
- Stats at Pro Football Reference

Harold Craig Bailey (born April 12, 1957) is an American former professional football player who was a wide receiver for two seasons with the Houston Oilers of the National Football League (NFL). He was selected by the Oilers in the eighth round of the 1980 NFL draft after playing college football for the Oklahoma State Cowboys. He was also a member of the Montreal Concordes of the Canadian Football League (CFL).

== Early life ==
Harold Craig Bailey was born on April 12, 1957, in Houston, Texas. He attended Yates High School in Houston.

== College career ==
Bailey was a four-year letterman at quarterback for the Oklahoma State Cowboys from 1976 to 1979. As a freshman in 1976, he completed three of 18 passes for 41 yards and one interception while also rushing 43 times for 126 yards. The next year, he totaled 13 completions on 37 passing attempts (35.1%) for 267 yards, one touchdown, and three interceptions, and 91 carries for 456 yards and three touchdowns. In 1978, Bailey recorded 12 completions on 40 attempts (30.0%) for 148 yards and six interceptions while rushing 28 times for 58 yards and one touchdown. As a senior in 1979, he completed 94 of 210 passes (44.8%) for 1,301 yards, five touchdowns, and seven interceptions while also totaling 83 rushing attempts for 88 yards and two touchdowns and one catch for a four-yard touchdown.

== Professional career ==
Bailey was selected by the Houston Oilers in the eighth round, with the 217th overall pick, of the 1980 NFL draft. He officially signed with the team on June 15. He was converted to wide receiver while with the Oilers. Bailey was placed on injured reserve on September 1 and spent the entire 1980 season there. He played in 11 games in 1981, primarily on special teams. He appeared in nine games, all starts, during the 1982 season, catching 26 passes for 367 yards and no touchdowns while also rushing once for 13 yards. In 1983, Bailey was diagnosed with peroneal nerve palsy. He was placed on injured reserve on August 30, 1983, and spent the entire season there. He was released by the Oilers on August 20, 1984.

Bailey signed with the Montreal Concordes of the Canadian Football League (CFL) in September 1994. He made his CFL debut on September 3, replacing the injured Brian DeRoo. He then started the team's next five games but dropped three passes in the final game of that stretch and was replaced by a now-healthy DeRoo for the rest of the year. Overall, Bailey played in six games as a slotback for the Concordes during the 1984 CFL season, recording 17 receptions for 276 yards and one touchdown. On June 20, 1985, it was reported that Bailey had been cut by the Concordes.
