= William Glass (American football) =

American football player (born 1957)

No. 45
- Position: Guard

Personal information
- Born: December 21, 1957 (age 68); Harlingen, Texas
- Listed height: 6 ft 4 in (1.93 m)
- Listed weight: 261 lb (118 kg)

Career information
- High school: Duncanville
- College: Baylor
- NFL draft: 1980: 4th round, 86th overall pick

Career history
- Cincinnati Bengals (1980)
- Stats at Pro Football Reference

William Parker Glass (born December 21, 1957) is an American former professional football player who was a guard for the Cincinnati Bengals of the National Football League (NFL). He played college football for the Baylor University.

His father Bill Glass played for the Detroit Lions and the Cleveland Browns.
