= Leo Biedermann =

American football player (born 1955)

No. 69
- Position: Tackle

Personal information
- Born: October 19, 1955 (age 71); Omaha, Nebraska, U.S.
- Listed height: 6 ft 7 in (2.01 m)
- Listed weight: 254 lb (115 kg)

Career information
- High school: Westmoor (Daly City, California)
- College: California
- NFL draft: 1978: 12th round, 317th overall pick

Career history
- Cleveland Browns (1978); Montreal Concordes (1982); Oakland Invaders (1983)

Career NFL statistics
- Games played: 16
- Stats at Pro Football Reference

Leo George Biedermann (born October 19, 1955) is an American former professional football player who was a tackle for the Cleveland Browns of the National Football League (NFL) in 1978. He played college football for the California Golden Bears. He also played professionally for the Montreal Concordes of the Canadian Football League (CFL) and Oakland Invaders of the United States Football League (USFL).
