= Hernando High School (Florida) =

Public school in Florida, United States

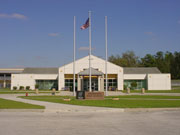

Location
- 111 Ernie Chatman Run; Brooksville, Hernando County, Florida; United States; 28.5594384°N 82.3859264°W

Information
- Type: Public Secondary
- School district: Hernando County School District
- Category: Co-Educational
- Oversight: Florida Department of Education
- Teaching staff: 62.00 (on an FTE basis)
- Grades: 9-12
- Enrollment: 1,270 (2023–2024)
- Student to teacher ratio: 20.48
- Colors: Purple; Gold
- Mascot: Leopard
- Newspaper: The Roar
- Yearbook: Leopard's Growl, Shift (2012)
- Website: www.hernandoschools.org/schools/hernando-high-school

Hernando High School is a public high school located in Brooksville, Florida. It is part of the Hernando County School District. It has been in operation since 1889, which makes it one of the oldest continuously operating public high schools in the United States.

== Community ==
Hernando High School is one of five high schools in Hernando County. Brooksville is a rural community of about 10,000 residents located 40 miles north of Tampa and 60 miles west of Orlando on Florida's Nature Coast.

== Curriculum ==
The school day is composed of seven 50-minute class periods with two lunch periods (A & B) on Monday, Wednesday, and Friday; and eight 43-minute class periods with two lunch periods (A & B) on Tuesday and Thursday. A broad range of course offerings include student education, career and technical courses, and grade-level academics. The curriculum also includes dual enrollment programs through Pasco–Hernando State College as well as Advanced Placement courses on campus and through Florida Virtual School.

== History ==
In 1849, the Florida Legislature passed and enacted its first Educational Legislation. This new law authorized construction of schools. At this time Hernando County included what is now known as Citrus and Pasco Counties. In the 1850s a handful of privately constructed schools existed in Hernando County in the Bayport and Spring Hill communities as well as a school in the Union Baptist Church in Brooksville.

In October 1887, the State Legislature enacted legislation that split Hernando County into 3 smaller counties; Citrus County - to the north, Pasco County, to the south, and Hernando County, in the center of the two. When the county was split into three, Brooksville, FL (in Hernando County) was the only community large enough to support a high school. So a committee was formed to establish such a school. This committee consisted of 3 locally prominent businessmen, William S. Hope, S.W. Davis and Warren W. Springstead. In October 1888 the committee proposed building a school designed to house grades 1 through 10. At the time, 10th would be the highest level of education offered in Hernando County

The proposal passed and the committee purchased land for the new school from Martha and Thomas Cook in the Saxon Heights area near the old Scarborough House. The land was purchased for a total of $499.00. A frame structure was completed and on February 4, 1889, Hernando High School opened. At its inception the Hernando High School staff consisted of Principal E. R. Warrener and 3 teachers. Hardy Croom and Alda Burns Wright were notable members of the inaugural class of 1889.

== Facilities ==
- Michael Joseph Bristol Instructional Buildings - Two 2-story buildings that house the bulk of HHS' classrooms.
- Michael Imhoff Gymnasium - basketball and volleyball venue.
- Jerome Brown Weight Training Facility - Home to the Leopard wrestling team.
- Hernando High Performing Arts Center - A facility to accommodate traveling shows.
- Tom Fisher Stadium - Home to Leopard Football, Soccer, and Track since the 1960s.
- Baseball Field - Home to a storied baseball tradition
- Agriculture Science Building - Home to HHS' Agriculture program.
- Band, Drama, and Chorus Building - Home to Hernando High's marching band, The Royale Regiment, and Drama Department.
- Culinary Building - Home to Hernando catering, Hernando's dining and catering establishment.
- Leopard Lunch Room - Opening at the beginning of the 2007 School year. A dining Facility.
- Hernando High Cafe - coffee shop. Also serves breakfast and lunch.
- Math building - a 2-story building

== Administration ==
- Leechele Booker- Principal
- Lorenzo Fields- Asst. Principal
- Stacey Swihart Asst. Principal
- Daniel O'Rourke - Asst. Principal

== Notable alumni ==
- Bill McCollum (1962) - Republican member of the United States House of Representatives and Attorney General of Florida
- Ricky Feacher (1972) - professional football player, NFL
- Allan Leavitt (1972) - professional football player, NFL
- George Lowe (1975) - voice actor
- Paul Farmer (1978) - physician and humanitarian
- George Floyd (1978) - professional football player, NFL
- Tammy Alexander (1981) - murder victim known as the "Caledonia Jane Doe", killed before graduating
- Jerome Brown (1983) - professional football player, NFL All-Pro
- Mike Walker (1984) - professional baseball player, MLB
- Mitch English (1987) - television personality
- Tyrone Woods (1987) - professional baseball player, NPB All-Star and KBO MBP
- Wynn Bruce (1989) - climate activist, self-immolated outside the Supreme Court as an act of protest against the climate crisis
- Bronson Arroyo (1995) - professional baseball player, MLB All-Star
- John Capel Jr. (1996) - professional track & field athlete, Olympian
- Windham Rotunda (2005) - professional wrestler, known as Bray Wyatt, WWE
- Taylor Rotunda (2008) - professional wrestler, known as Bo Dallas, WWE
- Christian Arroyo (2013) - professional baseball player, MLB
