= Brian Sipe =

American football player (born 1949)

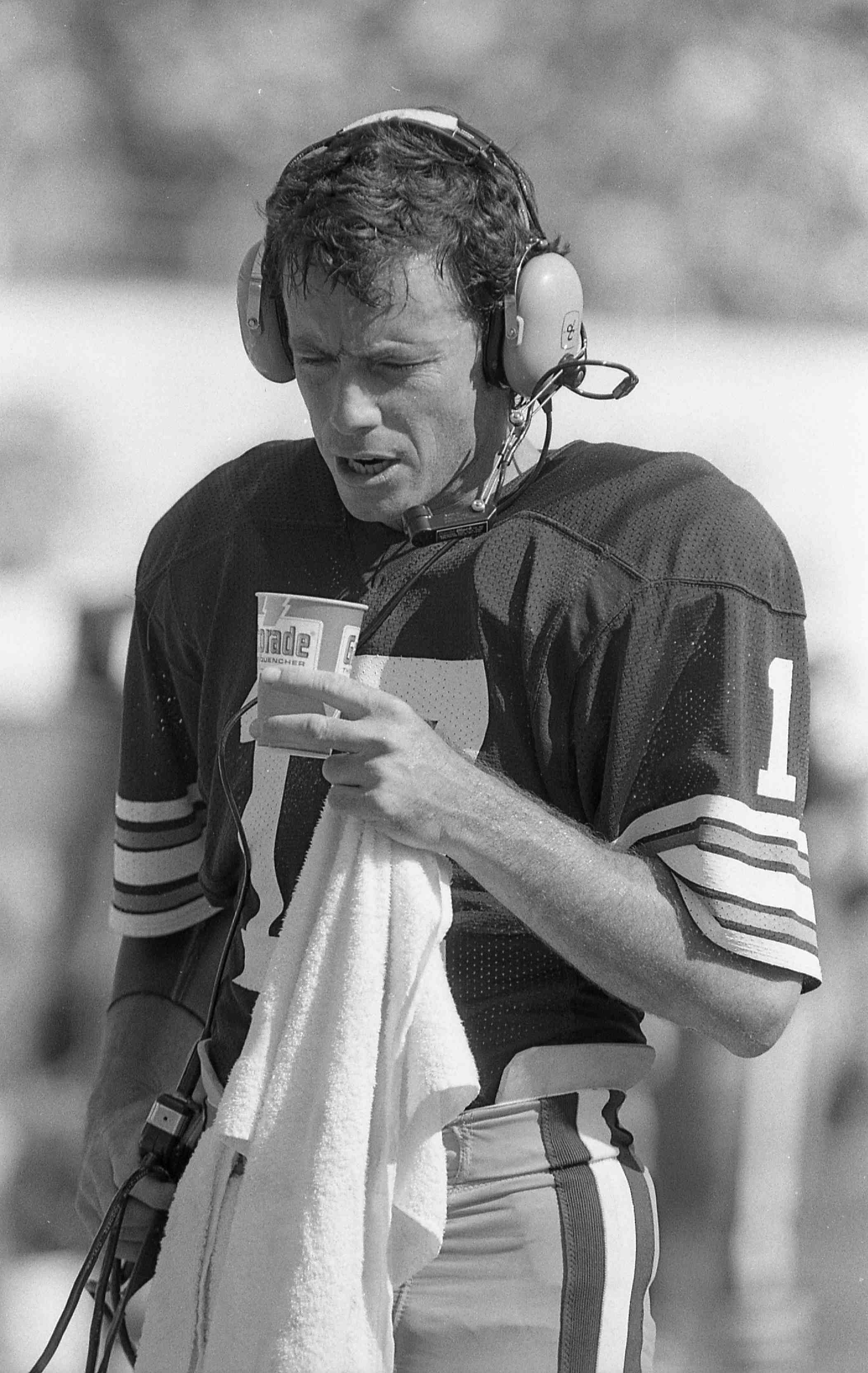
- Sipe c. 1979

No. 17
- Position: Quarterback

Personal information
- Born: August 8, 1949 (age 77); San Diego, California, U.S.
- Listed height: 6 ft 1 in (1.85 m)
- Listed weight: 195 lb (88 kg)

Career information
- High school: Grossmont (El Cajon, California)
- College: Grossmont (1967); San Diego State (1968–1971)
- NFL draft: 1972: 13th round, 330th overall pick

Career history
- Cleveland Browns (1974–1983); New Jersey Generals (1984); Jacksonville Bulls (1985)

Awards and highlights
- NFL Most Valuable Player (1980); First-team All-Pro (1980); Second-team All-Pro (1979); Pro Bowl (1980); NFL passing touchdowns leader (1979); NFL passer rating leader (1980); Cleveland Browns Legends; First-team All-PCAA (1971)

Career NFL statistics
- Passing attempts: 3,439
- Passing completions: 1,944
- Completion percentage: 56.5%
- TD–INT: 154–149
- Passing yards: 23,713
- Passer rating: 74.8
- Stats at Pro Football Reference

Brian Winfield Sipe (born August 8, 1949) is an American former professional football player who was a quarterback for the Cleveland Browns of the National Football League (NFL) from 1974 to 1983. He then played in the United States Football League (USFL) for two seasons.

Sipe was born and raised in California. He competed in the 1961 Little League World Series for El Cajon, California, and attended Grossmont High School. Although mostly sidelined for the first several years of his NFL career, Sipe was eventually recognized as one of the better quarterbacks in Browns history, winning the league's Most Valuable Player Award in 1980. He was a college football star under head coach Don Coryell at San Diego State University, where he studied architecture and became the team's quarterbacks coach in 2009, remaining in that role for six seasons, through 2014.

== Playing career ==
=== National Football League ===
Drafted 330th overall in the thirteenth round of the 1972 NFL draft by the Cleveland Browns, Sipe spent the first two years of his career as a member of the teamʼs reserve squad, seeing no action on the field.

In 1974, Sipe started four games after helping the Browns come back from a 12-point deficit against the Denver Broncos on October 27. However, after winning just one of these four contests (a 21–14 victory against the New England Patriots on November 11), he was replaced by Mike Phipps.

The team's disastrous 1975 season saw Sipe enter the starting lineup after three consecutive losses in which the Browns were outscored 124–26. Sipe's three starts saw the Browns become more competitive, but still resulted in a trio of defeats, sending him back to the sidelines. The following year, he finally moved into a consistent starting role following an opening game injury to Phipps on September 12, 1976. As the team's signal caller that season, he led them to a 9–5 record, a six-game improvement over the previous season. 1976 was the team's second year under head coach Forrest Gregg.

During the first half of the 1977 season, Sipe led the team to five wins in their first seven games. However, on November 13 of that year, Sipe suffered a season-ending shoulder injury at Three Rivers Stadium against the Pittsburgh Steelers in the second quarter of the team's 35–31 defeat. With Phipps gone to the Chicago Bears, the Browns turned to back-up quarterback Dave Mays, who went 1–3 as a starter. The 1977 season also saw a head coaching change as Gregg was fired and defensive coordinator Dick Modzelewski took over for the final game. Sipe came back the following year to throw for more than 2,900 yards and 21 touchdown passes, but the team's overall inconsistency resulted in an 8–8 finish.

Serving as the catalyst for many thrilling moments during the 1979 and 1980 seasons, Sipe helped the team earn the nickname "Kardiac Kids." The designation was in recognition of their tendency to produce heart-stopping comeback victories in the final minutes of many games. Over the course of these two seasons, Sipe led the Browns to eight comebacks and eleven game-winning drives in the fourth quarter or overtime.

Sipe led Cleveland to a 4–0 start in 1979, including a season opening overtime win over the New York Jets.

==== 1980 Most Valuable Player award season ====
In 1980, Sipe passed for 4,132 yards and 30 touchdowns, helping to lead the Browns to their first postseason berth since 1972. Individually, his efforts earned him the NFL Most Valuable Player award and a selection to the 1981 Pro Bowl. To this day, it is still the Browns single season passing yards record, as well as the only time a Browns quarterback threw for 4,000 yards in a season.

At the end of the divisional playoff game the Browns played against the Raiders, the Browns trailed by a score of 14–12. After the Browns forced the Raiders to turn the ball over on downs on the Browns' 15-yard line, Sipe led the Browns back down the field, reaching the Raiders 13-yard line in 9 plays. With just 49 seconds remaining, the Browns could have kicked a game-winning field goal, but due to the brutally cold and windy weather in Cleveland that day, which made a field goal attempt significantly more risky than usual, Browns' head coach Sam Rutigliano instead opted to pass the ball. Sipe attempted a pass to tight end Ozzie Newsome, but it was intercepted in the end zone by Raiders safety Mike Davis. That play brought the Browns' season to a heartbreaking close, while the Raiders went on to win Super Bowl XV over the Philadelphia Eagles. The play call - "Red Right 88" – was immortalized in Cleveland sports infamy.

==== 1981 and 1982 seasons ====
Sipe signing autographs in Canton, Ohio in 1979.

Despite throwing for 3,876 yards the following season, Sipeʼs Browns struggled to a 5–11 mark. In 1982, Sipe and the Browns won just two of the team's first six games in the strike-marred NFL season, and Sipe was benched in favor of third-year signal caller Paul McDonald.

=== United States Football League ===
Sipe regained his starting role the following year, but angered Browns management by negotiating with New Jersey Generals of the United States Football League during the season. Sipe finished the 1983 season with 3,566 passing yards and 26 touchdown passes. Sipe had led Cleveland to a 9–7 record and the team just missed qualifying for the American Football Conference playoffs. He then signed with the Generals and played for them in 1984, before concluding his career with the Jacksonville Bulls in 1985. Sipe's contract with the New Jersey was a three-year deal for $600,000 annually.

== Post-playing career ==
Sipe lives in San Diego and coached the football team at Santa Fe Christian School in Solana Beach, California, where he helped the Eagles to four CIF titles and a combined record of 75–21–1. Sipe was hired on January 18, 2009, as the quarterbacks coach for his alma mater, San Diego State. Sipe served in that role through the end of the 2014 season.

== Career statistics ==
Legend
	AP NFL MVP
	Led the league
**Bold**	Career high

=== NFL ===
Year	Team	Games			Passing							
Year	Team	GP	GS	Record	Cmp	Att	Pct	Yds	Avg	TD	Int	Rtg
1974	CLE	10	5	2–3	59	108	54.6	603	5.6	1	7	47.0
1975	CLE	7	2	0–2	45	88	51.1	427	4.9	1	3	54.4
1976	CLE	14	12	7–5	178	312	57.1	2,113	6.8	17	14	77.3
1977	CLE	9	9	5–4	112	195	57.4	1,233	6.3	9	14	61.8
1978	CLE	16	16	8–8	222	399	55.6	2,906	7.3	21	15	80.7
1979	CLE	16	16	9–7	286	535	53.5	3,793	7.1	28	**26**	73.4
1980	CLE	16	16	**11–5**	**337**	554	**60.8**	**4,132**	**7.5**	**30**	14	**91.4**
1981	CLE	16	16	5–11	313	**567**	55.2	3,876	6.8	17	25	68.2
1982	CLE	6	6	2–4	101	185	54.6	1,064	5.8	4	8	60.7
1983	CLE	15	14	8–6	291	496	58.7	3,566	7.2	26	23	79.1
Career		125	112	57–55	1,944	3,439	56.5	23,713	6.9	154	149	74.8

=== USFL ===
Year	Team	GP	Passing						
Year	Team	GP	Cmp	Att	Pct	Yds	TD	Int	Rtg
1984	New Jersey Generals	16	**192**	**324**	59.3	**2,540**	**17**	**15**	82.3
1985	Jacksonville Bulls	—	55	89	**61.8**	685	4	2	**91.5**
Career		—	247	413	56.5	3,225	21	17	84.3

== See also ==
- List of NCAA major college football yearly passing leaders
