= Greg Bright =

American football player (born 1957)

No. 47
- Position: Safety

Personal information
- Born: August 2, 1957 (age 69); Fort Campbell, Kentucky, U.S.
- Listed height: 6 ft 0 in (1.83 m)
- Listed weight: 208 lb (94 kg)

Career information
- High school: Suda E. Butler (Louisville, Kentucky)
- College: Morehead State (1976–1979)
- NFL draft: 1980: 9th round, 224th overall pick

Career history
- Cincinnati Bengals (1980–1981); Los Angeles Raiders (1982)*
- * Offseason or practice squad member only

Career NFL statistics
- Interceptions: 1
- Fumble recoveries: 3
- Sacks: 1
- Stats at Pro Football Reference

Gregory Keith Bright (born August 2, 1957) is an American former professional football player who was a safety for two seasons with the Cincinnati Bengals of the National Football League (NFL). He was selected by the Bengals in the ninth round of the 1980 NFL draft after playing college football for the Morehead State Eagles.

== Early life and college ==
Gregory Keith Bright was born on August 2, 1957, in Fort Campbell, Kentucky. He played high school football at Suda E. Butler High School in Louisville, Kentucky as a wide receiver. Bright was noted for his aggressive playstyle during his high school, college, and pro careers. He once knocked opposing players out of eight consecutive high school games.

Bright walked-on to Morehead State University, and was a four-year starter at safety for the Morehead State Eagles from 1976 to 1979.

== Professional career ==
Bright was selected by the Cincinnati Bengals in the ninth round, with the 224th overall pick, of the 1980 NFL draft. He officially signed with the team on June 4. He started all 16 games for the Bengals during his rookie year in 1980, recording one interception, one sack, and three fumble recoveries. Bright was released on August 31, 1981, re-signed on September 1, released on September 9, signed again on September 22, and released again on October 15, 1981. Overall, he played in four games, starting three, during the 1981 season. In January 1982, The Record claimed that Bright "could hit but couldn't cover".

Bright signed with the Los Angeles Raiders on March 1, 1982. He was released in late July 1982.

== Personal life ==
Bright later served in the United States Army.
