= Craig Bradshaw (American football) =

American football player (born 1957)

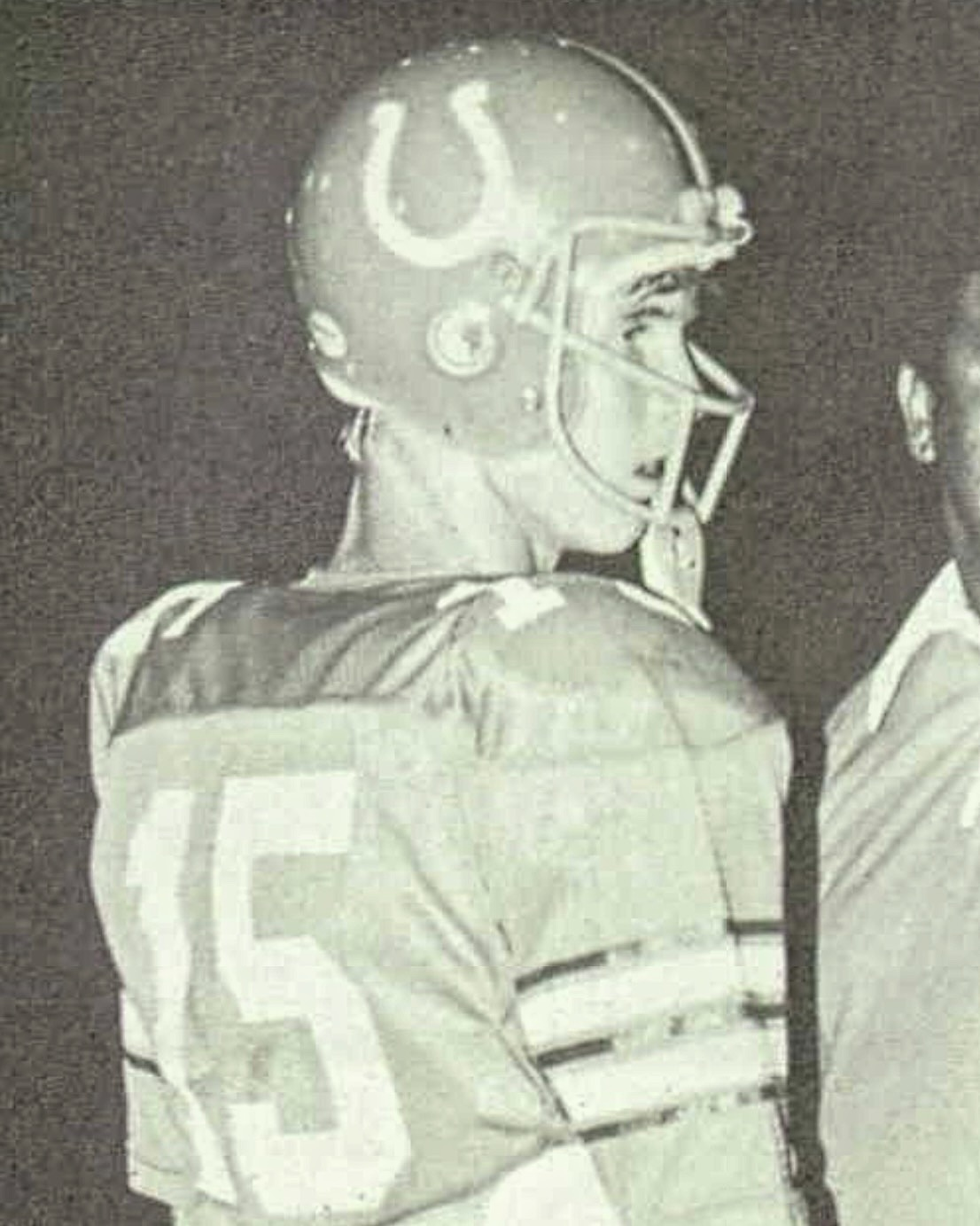
- Bradshaw during a game at Southwood High School

No. 10
- Position: Quarterback

Personal information
- Born: August 14, 1957 (age 69); Shreveport, Louisiana, U.S.
- Listed height: 6 ft 5 in (1.96 m)
- Listed weight: 215 lb (98 kg)

Career information
- High school: Southwood (Shreveport, Louisiana)
- College: Louisiana Tech (1977); Utah State (1978–1979)
- NFL draft: 1980: 7th round, 182nd overall pick

Career history
- Houston Oilers (1980); New Orleans Saints (1982–1983)

Career NFL statistics
- Games played: 2
- Stats at Pro Football Reference

William Craig Bradshaw (born August 14, 1957) is an American former professional football player who was a quarterback in the National Football League (NFL) for the Houston Oilers and the New Orleans Saints. He played college football for the Utah State Aggies. He is the younger brother of Pittsburgh Steelers quarterback Terry Bradshaw.

== Early life and family ==
Bradshaw was born on August 14, 1957 in Shreveport, Louisiana. His parents, William Bradshaw and Novis Gay, were longtime residents of Shreveport with his mother growing up in Red River Parish, just an hour north of the city. He is the youngest of three sons born to the couple, the other two being Gary and Pittsburgh Steelers four-time Super Bowl champion Terry Bradshaw. The brothers were only the second set of brothers to play quarterback in the NFL, following Ed and Joey Sternaman in 1927 and were the first quarterbacks to play opposite one another in a game.

Bradshaw attended Southwood High School in Shreveport between 1973 and 1977. He became his high school football team's starting quarterback as a junior in 1975. In addition to football, Bradshaw participated on the school's track and field team, where he threw javelin. In 1975, Bradshaw participated in Louisiana's district championships as a thrower.

== College career ==
Bradshaw played college football for his brothers' alma mater Louisiana Tech University in 1977. In his lone season with the Bulldogs, he completed 12 passes on 35 attempts for 143 yards and an interception. He transferred to Utah State University in 1978, where he played for two seasons. In his career with Utah State, he completed 44.7% of his passes (55-of-123) for 1,055 yards, nine touchdowns and seven interceptions.

=== College statistics ===
Season	Games		Passing						
Season	GP	Record	Cmp	Att	Pct	Yds	Y/A	TD	Int
1977	1	0-1	12	35	34.3	143	4.1	0	1
1978	11	7-4	32	76	42.1	575	7.6	6	4
1979	10	7-3	23	47	48.9	480	10.2	3	3
Career	22	14-8	67	158	42.4	1,198	7.6	9	8

== Professional career ==
Bradshaw was selected in the seventh round (182nd overall) of the 1980 NFL draft by the Houston Oilers and he played a total of two games in the 1980 season. He threw for no touchdowns or interceptions, however, the team was able to record victories in both games over the Tampa Bay Buccaneers and Cincinnati Bengals. He was let go from the team in the 1981 off season.

In 1982, he signed with the New Orleans Saints. Though he was with the team for two seasons, he did not see the field once as he sat behind Archie Manning and Ken Stabler during his tenure.

== NFL career statistics ==
Season	Games		Passing						
Season	GP	Record	Cmp	Att	Pct	Yds	Y/A	TD	Int
1980	2	2–0	0	0	—	0	—	0	0
1982	0	—	Did not play						
1983	0	—	Did not play						
Career	2	2–0	0	0	—	0	—	0	0
