= Alton Alexis =

American gridiron football player (born 1957)

No. 82
- Position: Wide receiver

Personal information
- Born: November 16, 1957 (age 68); New Iberia, Louisiana, U.S.
- Listed height: 6 ft 0 in (1.83 m)
- Listed weight: 184 lb (83 kg)

Career information
- High school: New Iberia Senior
- College: Tulane
- NFL draft: 1980: 11th round, 281st overall pick

Career history
- Cincinnati Bengals (1980); Calgary Stampeders (1981–1982); Jacksonville Bulls (1984-1985); Cleveland Browns (1986)*; Green Bay Packers (1988)*
- * Offseason or practice squad member only

Career NFL statistics
- Games played: 1
- Stats at Pro Football Reference

Alton Alexis (born November 16, 1957) is an American former professional football player who was a wide receiver for the Cincinnati Bengals of the National Football League (NFL) in 1980. He also played 18 games with the Calgary Stampeders of the Canadian Football League (CFL) from 1981 to 1982. Alexis scored five touchdowns with the Stampeders with 30 catches for 535 yards.

Alexis played in 1984 and 1985 with the Jacksonville Bulls of the USFL.
