= Larry Collins (American football) =

American football player (born 1955)

No. 23, 43
- Position: Running back

Personal information
- Born: August 8, 1955 (age 71); San Antonio, Texas, U.S.
- Listed height: 5 ft 11 in (1.80 m)
- Listed weight: 189 lb (86 kg)

Career information
- High school: Thomas Edison
- College: Texas A&I
- NFL draft: 1978: 3rd round, 67th overall pick

Career history
- Cleveland Browns (1978); New Orleans Saints (1980); Boston Breakers (1983)

Career NFL statistics
- Rushing yards: 64
- Rushing average: 2.9
- Touchdowns: 1
- Stats at Pro Football Reference

Larry Daniel Collins (born August 8, 1955) is an American former professional football player who was a running back in the National Football League (NFL).

== Early life ==
Collins was born and grew up in San Antonio, Texas. He attended Edison High School, where he played football and ran track. In football, he was a three-time All-City selection and rushed for over 1,000 yards in his junior and senior seasons. Collins was elected to the San Antonio Independent School District Athletic Hall of Fame in 2019.

== College career ==
Collins was a member of the Texas A&I (now Texas A&M–Kingsville) Javelinas for four seasons. His first carry as a freshman was a 79-yard touchdown run against Jacksonville State. He was twice named to the Associated Press's Little All-America team, was named first-team All-Lone Star Conference three times and the conference freshman of the year, and helped the Javelinas to three NAIA national championships. Collins finished his collegiate career with 4,511 total yards, then a record for a Texas college football player.

== Professional career ==
Collins was selected 67th overall in the third round of the 1978 NFL draft by the Cleveland Browns. Collins didn't play in 1979 but was signed by the New Orleans Saints midway through the 1980 season. He was a member of the Boston Breakers of the United States Football League during the 1983 season.
