= Sam Rutigliano =

Former college and NFL head coach (b. 1931)

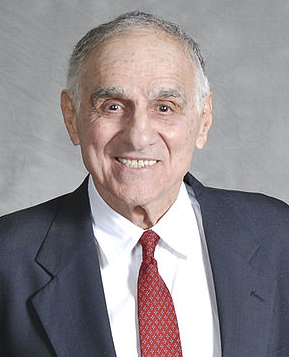
- Rutigliano in 2012

Biographical details
- Born: July 1, 1931 (age 95); Brooklyn, New York, U.S.

Playing career
- 1950-1951: East Central Junior College
- 1951–1952: Tennessee
- 1954–1955: Tulsa
- Position: End

Coaching career (HC unless noted)
- 1956–1958: Lafayette HS (NY)
- 1959–1961: Greenwich HS (CT)
- 1962–1963: Horace Greeley HS (NY)
- 1964–1965: Connecticut (DB)
- 1966: Maryland (WR)
- 1967–1970: Denver Broncos (WR)
- 1971–1973: New England Patriots (OB/WR)
- 1974–1975: New York Jets (DB)
- 1976–1977: New Orleans Saints (WR)
- 1978–1984: Cleveland Browns
- 1989–1999: Liberty
- 2000–2003: Barcelona Dragons (OA)
- 2004: Scottish Claymores (OA)
- 2005–2006: Hamburg Sea Devils (OA)

Head coaching record
- Overall: 47–50 (NFL); 67–53 (college)

Sam William Rutigliano (born July 1, 1931) is an American former football coach who is a television football analyst for WEWS, the ABC affiliate in Cleveland. He served as the head coach for the Cleveland Browns of the National Football League (NFL) from 1978 to 1984, compiling a record of 47–50. Rutigliano was the head football coach at Liberty University from 1989 to 1999, tallying a mark of 67–53.

== Early life ==
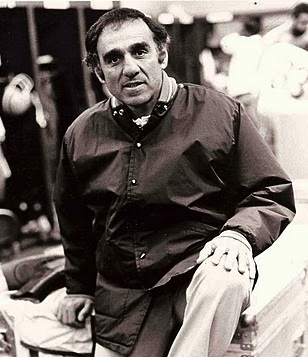
Rutigliano around 1979 at the Cleveland Browns practice facility

Rutigliano, the son of Italian immigrants, played high school football at Erasmus Hall High School in Brooklyn. He played college football at East Central Junior College, Tennessee, where he roomed with future professional wrestling star Lou Albano, and Tulsa. He coached at the high school level in New York and Connecticut, including Horace Greeley High School in Chappaqua, NY and Greenwich High School.

Sam Rutigliano became a Christian after the death of his daughter Nancy in a car accident in 1962.

== Coaching career ==
He was then defensive backs coach at the University of Connecticut from 1964 to 1965 and the wide receivers coach at the University of Maryland in 1966. He became a professional football assistant with the Denver Broncos in 1967. He was an assistant with the New England Patriots, New York Jets, and New Orleans Saints over the next eleven years before being given the head coaching job for the Cleveland Browns in 1978.

Over the next six years, Rutigliano was the coach of the famed "Kardiac Kids" Browns. He led the 1980 Browns to the AFC Central Division Championship. The final play of the Browns' playoff game with the Oakland Raiders would be the most memorable moment in Rutigliano's coaching career. Down 14–12 and within field goal range, Rutigliano decided to run one more play rather than kick a game-winning field goal. The play, called "Red Right 88", resulted in an end-zone interception with 41 seconds left that led to the Browns losing. After the loss, Rutigliano said at the press conference, “There are 800 million Chinese who didn’t even know we played today. We’ll get over this.”

Despite the early playoff exit, Rutigliano received NFL Coach of the Year honors for the 1980 season. The Browns returned to the playoffs in 1982 in the strike-shortened season that saw them go 4-5 and rally around Paul McDonald as the quarterback for the last three games due to an injury to Sipe. They trailed by three to the Raiders at halftime but gave up 14 unanswered points and lost 27–10. After a 9–7 season the following year, Sipe left the Browns for the United States Football League. McDonald was left as the starter for Cleveland for 1984. After a stretch where the team went 1–7, Rutigliano was fired. He was replaced by defensive coordinator Marty Schottenheimer, who went 4–4 as interim coach and was later retained. In his six and a half seasons with the Browns, Rutigliano compiled a 47–50 record.

After being let go by the Browns, Rutigliano served as an analyst for NBC Sports and ESPN for three years. He also held football camps in Italy and was a consultant for the Italian Football League.

In 1988, he was given the head coaching job at Liberty University, with founder Jerry Falwell stating that Rutigliano seemed the man to help "establish a sports program for evangelical young people." He was hired to take over the program from Morgan Hout. He had said no at first when approached but when invited to speak at the campus, he found the idea of being "part of this mission and use my God-given ability as a coach" compelling. In a program that followed Christian standards of no drugs, alcohol, tobacco, or co-ed rooms to go with having curfew and worship, Rutigliano saw it as an advantage for who he wanted in players rather than a disadvantage. The school was subject to creditors not long after he joined the program, but he got to work in raising money for the school utilizing his connections (which he later estimated was in the millions). Owing to their independent status in Division I-AA, the Flames were in a tough position in reaching the playoffs (which they did not end up doing in his tenure), although they did finish in the final rankings in 1995 and 1997. The 1989 season saw Liberty beat top-20 schools in James Madison and Eastern Illinois before their matchup against Eastern Michigan. Playing on the road, the Flames pulled off the 25–24 upset for their first victory over a Division I-A opponent in school history. They won their first six games of the season, the best start for a first-year Liberty coach until 2023. The 1990 team won their first four games and reached 8th in the football rankings. The nine wins in the 1997 season were a season record for the team until 2008. He would serve as coach for eleven years until retiring in 2000. He still ranks as the winningest coach in Liberty football history. His jersey (under "HC") was retired alongside Eric Green, a player on his roster that became Liberty's first NFL draft pick in history, in 2008. He was later inducted into the Liberty Athletics Hall of Fame in 2015.

Hours after leaving the Flames in what seemed like retirement, Rutigliano was hired as an assistant coach under Jack Bicknell with the Barcelona Dragons of the NFL Europe. He later served the same position for the Scottish Claymores of the NFL Europe.

Beginning in 2005, Rutigliano became a Browns analyst for WKYC channel 3 in Cleveland and also for SportsTime Ohio when it began operations in 2006. In 2011, he moved to WEWS-TV 5 to become their Browns analyst.

== Player addiction recovery program ==
Throughout the 1970s, substance abuse, particularly of cocaine, was a rampant problem among NFL players. During Rutigliano's tenure with the Browns, he and Dr. Gregory Collins of the Cleveland Clinic, with the support of team owner Art Modell, founded an anonymous support group known as the "Inner Circle" to help players with substance abuse problems.

In 2007, Rutigliano was given the National Council on Alcoholism and Drug Dependence's Bronze Key Award by the NCADD's Northeast Ohio affiliate, Recovery Resources.

== Head coaching record ==
=== NFL ===
Team	Year	Regular season					Postseason			
Team	Year	Won	Lost	Ties	Win %	Finish	Won	Lost	Win %	Result
CLE	1978	8	8	0	.500	3rd in AFC Central	-	–	–	–
CLE	1979	9	7	0	.563	3rd in AFC Central	–	–	–	–
CLE	1980	11	5	0	.688	1st in AFC Central	0	1	.000	Lost to Oakland Raiders in AFC Divisional Game.
CLE	1981	5	11	0	.313	4th in AFC Central	–	–	–	–
CLE	1982	4	5	0	.444	3rd in AFC Central	0	1	.000	Lost to Los Angeles Raiders in AFC Wild-Card Game.
CLE	1983	9	7	0	.563	2nd in AFC Central	–	–	–	–
CLE	1984	1	7	0	.125	3rd in AFC Central	–	–	–	–
CLE Total		47	50	0	.485		0	2	.000	
Total		47	50	0	.485		0	2	.000	

=== College ===
Year	Team	Overall	Conference	Standing	Bowl/playoffs	TSN^{#}
Liberty Flames (NCAA Division I-AA independent) (1989–1999)
1989	Liberty	7–3				
1990	Liberty	7–4				
1991	Liberty	4–7				
1992	Liberty	7–4				19
1993	Liberty	6–5				
1994	Liberty	5–6				
1995	Liberty	8–3				
1996	Liberty	5–6				
1997	Liberty	9–2				25
1998	Liberty	5–6				
1999	Liberty	4–7				
Liberty:		67–53				
Total:		67–53				
