= Dick Ambrose =

American football player (born 1953)

No. 52
- Position: Linebacker

Personal information
- Born: January 17, 1953 (age 73); New Rochelle, New York, U.S.
- Listed height: 6 ft 0 in (1.83 m)
- Listed weight: 235 lb (107 kg)

Career information
- High school: Iona Prep (New Rochelle)
- College: Virginia
- NFL draft: 1975: 12th round, 290th overall pick

Career history
- Cleveland Browns (1975–1983)

Awards and highlights
- Cleveland Browns Legends; 2× First-team All-ACC (1973, 1974)

Career NFL statistics
- Games played: 116
- Interceptions: 5
- Fumbles recovered: 9
- Stats at Pro Football Reference

Richard John Ambrose (born January 17, 1953) is an American former professional football player who was a linebacker for nine seasons with the Cleveland Browns of the National Football League (NFL) from 1975 to 1983. During his playing days he was nicknamed "Bam-Bam", after the eponymous character from The Flintstones, for his tackling and physicality.

Ambrose played college football for the Virginia Cavaliers. After retiring from the NFL, he became an attorney and has been a judge of the Cuyahoga County Court of Common Pleas since 2004.

== Football career ==
A graduate of Iona Prep, Ambrose played college football at the University of Virginia and earned All-ACC (first-team) honors during his junior and senior seasons. He graduated with a Bachelor of Science in Education from Virginia. In the 1975 NFL draft he was drafted by the Cleveland Browns in the 12th round (290th overall).

Ambrose played nine seasons with the Cleveland Browns and was starting middle/right linebacker during the late 1970s to early 1980s before injuries curtailed his career. As a 12th-round pick, he would have been an undrafted free agent in the present day and was not considered to be a starter. He stepped in as an injury replacement and became starting middle linebacker despite being a rookie. He was part of the 1980 team known as the "Kardiac Kids" which won the division title for the first time since 1971 but lost in the divisional playoffs by a mere two points to the Oakland Raiders. His final season (1984) was spent on the injured reserve list, prompting his eventual retirement. He was popularly known as "Bam Bam" for his hard-nosed tackling and physical skills. The Plain Dealer ranked him number 94 in its special feature of the Browns' top 100 all-time greats.

== Legal career ==
Ambrose began his legal studies while still playing football for the Cleveland Browns, graduating magna cum laude in 1987 from Cleveland State University College of Law. After graduating from Cleveland-Marshall, he joined the firm of McDonald Hopkins. He has also been associated with the firms of Chriszt McGarry Co. and Nicola Gudbranson and Cooper. He was the presiding judge in the trial of Anthony Sowell, the Cleveland serial killer who was found guilty on 82 charges. On August 12, 2011, Ambrose sentenced Sowell to death.
