= Ricky Feacher =

American football player (born 1954)

No. 83, 85
- Position: Wide receiver

Personal information
- Born: February 11, 1954 (age 72); Crystal River, Florida, U.S.
- Listed height: 5 ft 10 in (1.78 m)
- Listed weight: 174 lb (79 kg)

Career information
- High school: Hernando (Brooksville, Florida)
- College: Mississippi Valley State
- NFL draft: 1976: 10th round, 270th overall pick

Career history
- New England Patriots (1976); Cleveland Browns (1976 -1984)

Career NFL statistics
- Receptions: 115
- Receiving yards: 2,122
- Receiving TDs: 15
- Stats at Pro Football Reference

Richard Ivy Feacher (born February 11, 1954) is an American former professional football player who was a wide receiver for nine seasons in the National Football League (NFL) from 1976 to 1984, primarily for the Cleveland Browns. He played college football for the Mississippi Valley State Delta Devils.

Feacher holds the record for the fastest 100 yard dash 9.6, and was a star football player for the Hernando High School Leopards, located in Brooksville, Florida. In 2011, Feacher was inducted into the Hernando High School Hall of Fame.
