= 1978 Houston Oilers season =

NFL team season

- Owner: Bud Adams
- General manager: Bum Phillips
- Head coach: Bum Phillips
- Home stadium: Astrodome

Results
- Record: 10–6
- Division place: 2nd AFC Central
- Playoffs: Won Wild Card Playoffs (at Dolphins) 17–9; Won Divisional Playoffs (at Patriots) 31–14; Lost AFC Championship (at Steelers) 5–34
- All-Pros: FB Earl Campbell (1st team); LB Robert Brazile (1st team); DT Elvin Bethea (2nd team); DE Curley Culp (2nd team)
- Pro Bowlers: FB Earl Campbell; DT Elvin Bethea; LB Robert Brazile; FS Mike Reinfeldt; K Toni Fritsch

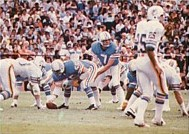
Oilers quarterback Dan Pastorini in the 1978 AFC wild card game.

The 1978 Houston Oilers season was the franchise's 19th overall and the ninth in the National Football League (NFL). Led by Rookie RB Earl Campbell, who won both the Offensive Rookie of the Year, and Offensive Player of the Year, who rushed for 1,450 yards, the Oilers made the playoffs with a 10–6 record, making the playoffs for the first time since 1969, qualifying in the newly created fifth Wild Card spot. The franchise scored 283 points while the defense gave up 298 points. Their record of 10 wins and 6 losses resulted in a second-place finish in the AFC Central Division. In the playoffs, the Oilers would stun the Miami Dolphins, 17–9, in the two teams first playoff meeting, then defeated the New England Patriots 31–14 in New England to advance to their first ever AFC Championship game, but in that game, they would score a mere 5 points in a 34–5 blowout loss to the eventual champion Steelers.

== Season summary ==
The Oilers appeared twice on Monday Night Football. In their first appearance on Monday Night Football, the Oilers beat the Pittsburgh Steelers 24–17. In their second appearance, the Oilers defeated the Miami Dolphins 35–30. The Oilers number one draft pick, Earl Campbell, a 5–11, 232-pound ball-carrying dynamo from the University of Texas, joined the Houston Oilers as the first player taken in the 1978 National Football League Draft. The first player to earn All-Southwest Conference honors four years, Campbell was a consensus All-America and the Heisman Trophy winner in 1977. Campbell took the NFL by storm right from the very start. In 1978, he was named the NFL's Most Valuable Player, All-Pro, and Rookie of the Year. He won the league rushing championship with 1,450 yards and was named to the AFC Pro Bowl squad. Possibly the highlight of the Oilers' fantastic season was the contest against the Miami Dolphins, in which Campbell racked up 199 yards, 81 of them coming on a TD run in the fourth quarter.

== Offseason ==
=== NFL draft ===
1978 Houston Oilers draft
Round	Pick	Player	Position	College	Notes
1	1	Earl Campbell * ^{†}	Running back	Texas	
3	73	Gifford Nielsen	Quarterback	BYU	
4	98	Mike Renfro	Wide receiver	TCU	
6	154	Conrad Rucker	Tight end	Southern	
8	210	J. C. Wilson	Defensive back	Pittsburgh	
9	239	Jim Mol	Defensive end	Morningside	
10	266	Steve Young	Tight end	Wake Forest	
11	295	Willie Thicklen	Wide receiver	Alabama State	
12	322	John Schuhmacher	Guard	USC	
Made roster † Pro Football Hall of Fame * Made at least one Pro Bowl during career

=== Undrafted free agents ===
1978 undrafted free agents of note
Player	Position	College
Richard Ingraham	Tight end	Texas
Gerald Petsch	Tackle	Iowa State
Mose Rison	Running back	Central Michigan
Ronald Rummel	Quarterback	Central Michigan
Gregory Warren	Tight end	Southern Illinois

== Personnel ==
=== Roster ===
1978 Houston Oilers roster
Quarterbacks (QB): 11 Tommy Duniven; 14 Gifford Nielsen; 7 Dan Pastorini; Running backs (RB): 34 Earl Campbell; 47 Ronnie Coleman; 31 Brian Duncan; 39 Larry Poole; 45 Tim Wilson; Wide receivers (WR): 00 Ken Burrough; 88 Rich Caster; 81 Johnnie Dirden; 29 Guido Merkens; 42 Robert Woods; Tight ends (TE): 86 Mike Barber; 87 Conrad Rucker	Offensive linemen (OL): 58 David Carter C; 60 Ed Fisher G; 74 Larry Harris G; 70 Conway Hayman G/T; 55 Carl Mauck C; 64 George Reihner G; 73 Greg Sampson T; 62 John Schuhmacher G; 76 Morris Towns G/T; Defensive linemen (DL): 65 Elvin Bethea DE; 78 Curley Culp NT; 69 Andy Dorris DE; 71 Ken Kennard NT; 77 James Young DE	Linebackers (LB): 63 Steve Baumgartner OLB; 54 Gregg Bingham ILB; 52 Robert Brazile OLB; 57 Steve Kiner ILB; 51 Ted Thompson ILB; 59 Ted Washington OLB; Defensive backs (DB): 19 Willie Alexander CB; 20 Bill Currier SS; 15 Al Johnson CB; 25 Kurt Knoff SS; 37 Mike Reinfeldt FS; 27 Greg Stemrick CB; 38 C. L. Whittington FS; 33 J. C. Wilson CB; Special teams (ST): 16 Toni Fritsch K; 18 Cliff Parsley P	Reserve: 26 Rob Carpenter RB (IR); 67 Jimmy Dean DE (IR); 89 Eddie Foster WR (IR); 32 David Gray CB (IR); 84 Billy Johnson WR (IR); 68 Jim Mol DE (IR); -- Jeff Perlinger DT (IR); 82 Mike Renfro WR (IR); 53 Art Stringer LB (IR); 28 Mike Voight RB (IR); -- Steve Young TE (IR); Rookies in italics

== Preseason ==
=== Schedule ===
Week	Date	Opponent	Result	Record	Venue	Attendance	Recap
1	August 5	Denver Broncos	L 12–17	0–1	Astrodome	48,027	
2	August 14	Philadelphia Eagles	L 10–28	0–2	Astrodome	49,334	
3	August 19	at Dallas Cowboys	W 27–13	1–2	Texas Stadium	62,242	
4	August 26	New Orleans Saints	L 3–17	1–3	Astrodome	49,554	

== Pre season Game summaries ==
=== Week P1 (Saturday, August 5, 1978): vs. Denver Broncos ===
Preseason Week 1: Denver Broncos 17 at Houston Oilers 12 – Game summary

Quarter	1	2	3	4	Total
Broncos (1–0)	0	0	7	10	17
Oilers (0–1)	3	2	7	0	12

at Astrodome • Houston, Texas

- Date: August 5, 1978
- Game time: 8:00 p.m. CDT
- Game weather: Indoors (dome)
- Game attendance: 48,027
- TV: KPRC-TV

Team	Category	Player	Statistics
DEN	Passing		
DEN	Rushing		
DEN	Receiving		
HOU	Passing		
HOU	Rushing		
HOU	Receiving		

Scoring summary

Quarter	Time	Drive			Team	Scoring information	Score	
Quarter	Time	Plays	Yards	TOP	Team	Scoring information	DEN	HOU
"TOP" = time of possession. For other American football terms, see Glossary of American football.							17	12

- Time of game:

Broncos	Game statistics	Oilers
	First downs	
	Rushes–yards	
	Passing yards	
	Passes	
	Sacked–yards	
	Net passing yards	
	Total yards	
	Return yards	
	Punts	
	Fumbles–lost	
	Penalties–yards	

=== Week P2 (Monday, August 14, 1978): vs. Philadelphia Eagles ===
Preseason Week 2: Philadelphia Eagles 28 at Houston Oilers 10 – Game summary

Quarter	1	2	3	4	Total
Eagles (2–1)	7	7	7	7	28
Oilers (0–2)	3	7	0	0	10

at Astrodome • Houston, Texas

- Date: August 14, 1978
- Game time: 8:00 p.m. CDT
- Game weather: Indoors (dome)
- Game attendance: 49,334
- TV: KPRC-TV

Team	Category	Player	Statistics
PHI	Passing		
PHI	Rushing		
PHI	Receiving		
HOU	Passing		
HOU	Rushing		
HOU	Receiving		

Scoring summary

Quarter	Time	Drive			Team	Scoring information	Score	
Quarter	Time	Plays	Yards	TOP	Team	Scoring information	PHI	HOU
"TOP" = time of possession. For other American football terms, see Glossary of American football.							28	10

- Time of game:

Eagles	Game statistics	Oilers
	First downs	
	Rushes–yards	
	Passing yards	
	Passes	
	Sacked–yards	
	Net passing yards	
	Total yards	
	Return yards	
	Punts	
	Fumbles–lost	
	Penalties–yards	

=== Week P3 (Saturday, August 19, 1978): at Dallas Cowboys ===
Preseason Week 3: Houston Oilers 27 at Dallas Cowboys 13 – Game summary

Quarter	1	2	3	4	Total
Oilers (1–2)	0	7	14	6	27
Cowboys (2–1)	0	3	3	7	13

at Texas Stadium • Irving, Texas

- Date: August 19, 1978
- Game time: 8:00 p.m. CDT
- Game attendance: 62,242
- Referee: Red Cashion
- TV: KPRC-TV

Team	Category	Player	Statistics
HOU	Passing		
HOU	Rushing		
HOU	Receiving		
DAL	Passing		
DAL	Rushing		
DAL	Receiving		

Scoring summary

Quarter	Time	Drive			Team	Scoring information	Score	
Quarter	Time	Plays	Yards	TOP	Team	Scoring information	HOU	DAL
"TOP" = time of possession. For other American football terms, see Glossary of American football.							27	13

- Time of game:

Oilers	Game statistics	Cowboys
	First downs	
	Rushes–yards	
	Passing yards	
	Passes	
	Sacked–yards	
	Net passing yards	
	Total yards	
	Return yards	
	Punts	
	Fumbles–lost	
	Penalties–yards	

== Regular season ==
On November 20, 1978, the Oilers took on the Miami Dolphins on Monday Night Football. In order to boost team spirit, the Oilers gave each fan a blue and white pom-pom before the game. The sight of over 50,000 fans waving the pom-poms inspired the Oilers to a 35–30 victory, behind Campbell's 199 rushing yards and 4 touchdowns. This would be the start of Luv Ya Blue.

=== Schedule ===
Week	Date	Opponent	Result	Record	Venue	Attendance	Recap
1	September 3	at Atlanta Falcons	**L** 14–20	0–1	Atlanta–Fulton County Stadium	57,328	Recap
2	September 10	at Kansas City Chiefs	**W** 20–17	1–1	Arrowhead Stadium	40,213	Recap
3	September 17	San Francisco 49ers	**W** 20–19	2–1	Astrodome	46,161	Recap
4	September 24	Los Angeles Rams	**L** 6–10	2–2	Astrodome	45,749	Recap
5	October 1	at **Cleveland Browns**	**W** 16–13	3–2	Cleveland Municipal Stadium	72,776	Recap
6	October 8	at Oakland Raiders	**L** 17–21	3–3	Oakland–Alameda County Coliseum	52,550	Recap
7	October 15	Buffalo Bills	**W** 17–10	4–3	Astrodome	47,727	Recap
8	October 23	at **Pittsburgh Steelers**	**W** 24–17	5–3	Three Rivers Stadium	48,021	Recap
9	October 29	at **Cincinnati Bengals**	**L** 13–28	5–4	Riverfront Stadium	50,532	Recap
10	November 5	**Cleveland Browns**	**W** 14–10	6–4	Astrodome	45,827	Recap
11	November 12	at New England Patriots	**W** 26–23	7–4	Schaefer Stadium	60,356	Recap
12	November 20	Miami Dolphins	**W** 35–30	8–4	Astrodome	50,290	Recap
13	November 26	**Cincinnati Bengals**	**W** 17–10	9–4	Astrodome	43,245	Recap
14	December 3	**Pittsburgh Steelers**	**L** 3–13	9–5	Astrodome	54,261	Recap
15	December 10	at New Orleans Saints	**W** 17–12	10–5	Louisiana Superdome	63,169	Recap
16	December 17	San Diego Chargers	**L** 24–45	10–6	Astrodome	49,554	Recap
Note: Intra-division opponents are in bold text.

=== Standings ===
AFC Central
	W	L	T	PCT	DIV	CONF	PF	PA	STK
^{(1)} Pittsburgh Steelers	14	2	0	.875	5–1	11–1	356	195	W5
^{(5)} Houston Oilers	10	6	0	.625	4–2	8–4	283	298	L1
Cleveland Browns	8	8	0	.500	1–5	4–8	334	356	L1
Cincinnati Bengals	4	12	0	.250	2–4	2–10	252	284	W3

== Regular season game summaries ==
=== Week 1 (Sunday, September 3, 1978): at Atlanta Falcons ===
Week 1: Houston Oilers 14 at Atlanta Falcons 20 – Game summary

Quarter	1	2	3	4	Total
Oilers (0–1)	7	0	7	0	14
Falcons (1–0)	0	14	3	3	20

at Atlanta–Fulton County Stadium • Atlanta, Georgia

- Date: September 3, 1978
- Game time: 12 Noon CDT
- Game weather: 77 °F or 25 °C, relative humidity 75%, wind 10 miles per hour (16 km/h; 8.7 kn)
- Game attendance: 57,328
- Referee: Jerry Markbreit
- TV announcers (NBC): Dick Enberg (play–by–play) and Merlin Olsen (color commentator)

Team	Category	Player	Statistics
HOU	Passing	Dan Pastorini	19/36, 136 YDS, 1 TD, 2 INTs
HOU	Rushing	Earl Campbell	15 CAR, 137 YDS, 1 TD
HOU	Receiving	Ken Burrough	6 REC, 56 YDS
ATL	Passing	June Jones	10/23, 104 YDS, 1 TD
ATL	Rushing	Bubba Bean	14 CAR, 55 YDS
ATL	Receiving	Bubba Bean	3 REC, 37 YDS, 1 TD

Scoring summary

Quarter	Time	Drive			Team	Scoring information	Score	
Quarter	Time	Plays	Yards	TOP	Team	Scoring information	HOU	ATL
1	8:21				Oilers	Campbell 73-yard touchdown run, Fritsch kick good	7	0
2	10:40				Falcons	Bean 38-yard touchdown reception from Jones, Steinfort kick good	7	7
2	4:51				Falcons	Moriarty recovered blocked punt in end zone, Steinfort kick good	7	14
3	13:08				Oilers	Caster 8-yard touchdown reception from Pastorini, Fritsch kick good	14	14
3	4:05				Falcons	30-yard field goal by Steinfort	14	17
4	8:53				Falcons	48-yard field goal by Steinfort	14	20
"TOP" = time of possession. For other American football terms, see Glossary of American football.							14	20

- Point spread: Oilers –3½
- Over/under:
- Time of game:

Oilers	Game statistics	Falcons
13	First downs	11
21–156	Rushes–yards	35–100
136	Passing yards	104
19–36–2	Passes	10–23–0
4–31	Sacked–yards	4–33
105	Net passing yards	71
261	Total yards	171
192	Return yards	153
9–37.1	Punts	9–42.7
4–2	Fumbles–lost	3–1
7–52	Penalties–yards	8–75
	Time of Possession	

Individual stats

Oilers Passing
	C/ATT^{1}	Yds	TD	INT	Sk	Yds	LG^{3}	Rate
Pastorini	19/36	136	1	2	4	31	21	47.9

Oilers Rushing
	Car^{2}	Yds	TD	LG^{3}
Campbell	15	137	1	73
Wilson	6	19	0	13

Oilers Receiving
	Rec^{4}	Yds	TD	LG^{3}
Burrough	6	56	0	19
Caster	5	44	1	18
Coleman	4	45	0	21
Campbell	2	–8	0	–3
Renfro	1	3	0	3
Carpenter	1	–4	0	–4

Oilers Kick Returns
	Ret	Yds	Y/Rt	TD	Lng
Dirden	3	127	42.3	0	60
Davis	2	42	21.0	0	25

Oilers Punt Returns
	Ret	Yds	Y/Rt	TD	Lng
Coleman	4	23	5.8	0	16

Oilers Punting
	Pnt	Yds	Y/P	Lng	Blck
Parsley	9	334	37.1	47	1

Oilers Kicking
	FGM–FGA	XPM–XPA
Fritsch		2–2

Oilers Sacks
	Sacks
Brazile	2.0
Washington	1.0
Kennard	1.0

Starting Lineups

Position	Starting Lineups at Atlanta
Offense
WR	Ken Burrough
LT	Greg Sampson
LG	George Reihner
C	Carl Mauck
RG	Morris Towns
RT	Conway Hayman
TE	Mike Barber
WR	Mike Renfro
QB	Dan Pastorini
RB	Earl Campbell
FB	Tim Wilson
Defense
LDE	James Young
NT	Curley Culp
RDE	Elvin Bethea
LOLB	Robert Brazile
LILB	Steve Kiner
RILB	Gregg Bingham
ROLB	Ted Washington
LCB	Willie Alexander
RCB	Greg Stemrick
SS	Bill Currier
WS	Mike Reinfeldt

=== Week 3 (Sunday, September 17, 1978): vs. San Francisco 49ers ===
Week 3: San Francisco 49ers 19 at Houston Oilers 20 – Game summary

Quarter	1	2	3	4	Total
49ers (0–3)	0	7	6	6	19
Oilers (2–1)	7	3	7	3	20

at Astrodome • Houston, Texas

- Date: September 17, 1978
- Game time: 1:00 p.m. CDT
- Game weather: Indoors (dome)
- Game attendance: 46,161
- Referee: Don Wedge
- TV announcers (CBS): Lindsey Nelson (play–by–play) and Paul Hornung (color commentator)

Team	Category	Player	Statistics
SF	Passing		
SF	Rushing		
SF	Receiving		
HOU	Passing		
HOU	Rushing		
HOU	Receiving		

Scoring summary

Quarter	Time	Drive			Team	Scoring information	Score	
Quarter	Time	Plays	Yards	TOP	Team	Scoring information	SF	HOU
1					Oilers	Campbell 4-yard touchdown run, Fritsch kick good	0	7
2					Oilers	38-yard field goal by Fritsch	0	10
2					49ers	26-yard field goal by Wersching	3	10
2					49ers	19-yard field goal by Wersching	6	10
3					Oilers	Burrough 13-yard touchdown reception from Pastorini, Fritsch kick good	6	17
3					49ers	Solomon 58-yard touchdown reception from DeBerg, Wersching kick no good	12	17
4					49ers	Seal 8-yard touchdown reception from DeBerg, Wersching kick good	19	17
4					Oilers	19-yard field goal by Fritsch	19	20
"TOP" = time of possession. For other American football terms, see Glossary of American football.							19	20

- Point spread:
- Over/under:
- Time of game:

49ers	Game statistics	Oilers
	First downs	
	Rushes–yards	
	Passing yards	
	Passes	
	Sacked–yards	
	Net passing yards	
	Total yards	
	Return yards	
	Punts	
	Fumbles–lost	
	Penalties–yards	
	Time of Possession	

In an early test to see how good the Oilers are the Oilers took a 10-6 halftime lead on Earl Campbell's 4-yard touchdown run and a Toni Fritsch's 38-yard field goal while the 49ers countered with kicks of 26 and 19 yards by Ray Wersching. The Oilers extend their lead late in the third quarter with a nearly perfect 13-yard touchdown pass from Dan Pastorini to Ken Burrough, who out-reached cornerback Anthony Leonard in the end zone. But Steve DeBerg who had 321 yards passing this day came back with a 58-yard touchdown pass to Freddie Solomon before the third period and then with 7:51 left in the game completed a 78-yard drive that ended with an 8-yard touchdown pass to Paul Seal. It took a determined 80-yard drive that ended with a clutch 19-yard field goal by Fritsch with 1:16 left to give the Oilers the lead, but the 49ers had one more chance and doing it without O. J. Simpson but Wersching's 46-yard field goal sailed wide left as the Oilers got an important win.

=== Week 4 (Sunday, September 24, 1978): vs. Los Angeles Rams ===
Week 4: Los Angeles Rams 10 at Houston Oilers 6 – Game summary

Quarter	1	2	3	4	Total
Rams (4–0)	7	3	0	0	10
Oilers (2–2)	0	3	0	3	6

at Astrodome • Houston, Texas

- Date: September 24, 1978
- Game time: 12 Noon CDT
- Game weather: Indoors (dome)
- Game attendance: 45,749
- Referee: Pat Haggerty
- TV announcers (CBS): Vin Scully (play–by–play), George Allen (color commentator) and Jim Brown (color commentator)

Team	Category	Player	Statistics
LA	Passing	Pat Haden	17/26, 220 YDS
LA	Rushing	John Cappelletti	18 CAR, 78 YDS
LA	Receiving	Terry Nelson	6 REC, 98 YDS
HOU	Passing	Dan Pastorini	10/20, 120 YDS, 1 INT
HOU	Rushing	Earl Campbell	13 CAR, 77 YDS
HOU	Receiving	Rob Carpenter	4 REC, 54 YDS

Scoring summary

Quarter	Time	Drive			Team	Scoring information	Score	
Quarter	Time	Plays	Yards	TOP	Team	Scoring information	LA	HOU
1					Rams	Bryant 3-yard touchdown run, Corral kick good	7	0
2					Rams	25-yard field goal by Corral	10	0
2					Oilers	32-yard field goal by Fritsch	10	3
4					Oilers	20-yard field goal by Fritsch	10	6
"TOP" = time of possession. For other American football terms, see Glossary of American football.							10	6

- Point spread: Oilers +2½
- Over/under:
- Time of game:

Rams	Game statistics	Oilers
26	First downs	10
50–175	Rushes–yards	23–112
220	Passing yards	120
17–26–0	Passes	10–20–1
1–7	Sacked–yards	0–0
213	Net passing yards	120
388	Total yards	232
77	Return yards	78
3–47.3	Punts	5–30.6
4–3	Fumbles–lost	2–1
1–14	Penalties–yards	5–29
	Time of Possession	

=== Week 8 (Monday, October 23, 1978): at Pittsburgh Steelers ===
Week 8: Houston Oilers 24 at Pittsburgh Steelers 17 – Game summary

Quarter	1	2	3	4	Total
Oilers (5–3)	0	10	7	7	24
Steelers (7–1)	0	10	0	7	17

at Three Rivers Stadium • Pittsburgh, Pennsylvania

- Date: October 23, 1978
- Game time: 8:00 p.m. CDT
- Game weather: 56 °F or 13.3 °C, relative humidity 72%, wind 12 miles per hour (19 km/h; 10 kn)
- Game attendance: 48,021
- Referee: Ben Dreith
- TV announcers (ABC): Frank Gifford (play–by–play) and Howard Cosell (color commentator)

Team	Category	Player	Statistics
HOU	Passing	Dan Pastorini	13/19, 160 YDS
HOU	Rushing	Earl Campbell	21 CAR, 89 YDS, 3 TDs
HOU	Receiving	Rob Carpenter	4 REC, 23 YDS
PIT	Passing	Terry Bradshaw	17/33, 226 YDS, 2 TDs, 1 INT
PIT	Rushing	Franco Harris	16 CAR, 56 YDS
PIT	Receiving	Randy Grossman	9 REC, 116 YDS

Scoring summary

Quarter	Time	Drive			Team	Scoring information	Score	
Quarter	Time	Plays	Yards	TOP	Team	Scoring information	HOU	PIT
2					Oilers	Campbell 1-yard touchdown run, Fritsch kick good	7	0
2					Steelers	Swann 25-yard touchdown reception from Bradshaw, Gerela kick good	7	7
2					Steelers	30-yard field goal by Gerela	10	10
2					Oilers	39-yard field goal by Fritsch	10	10
3					Oilers	Campbell 3-yard touchdown run, Fritsch kick good	17	10
4					Oilers	Campbell 1-yard touchdown run, Fritsch kick good	24	10
4					Steelers	Swann 6-yard touchdown reception from Bradshaw, Gerela kick good	24	17
"TOP" = time of possession. For other American football terms, see Glossary of American football.							24	17

- Point spread: Oilers +7½
- Over/under:
- Time of game:

Oilers	Game statistics	Steelers
22	First downs	21
43–169	Rushes–yards	31–113
160	Passing yards	226
13–19–0	Passes	17–33–1
0–0	Sacked–yards	1–11
160	Net passing yards	215
329	Total yards	328
65	Return yards	120
4–40.5	Punts	3–41.3
2–1	Fumbles–lost	2–0
6–51	Penalties–yards	7–53
	Time of Possession	

=== Week 11 (Sunday, November 12, 1978): at New England Patriots ===
Week 11: Houston Oilers 26 at New England Patriots 23 – Game summary

Quarter	1	2	3	4	Total
Oilers (7–4)	0	7	7	12	26
Patriots (8–3)	6	17	0	0	23

at Schaefer Stadium • Foxborough, Massachusetts

- Date: November 12, 1978
- Game time: 12:00 Noon CST
- Game attendance: 60,356
- Referee: Red Cashion
- TV announcers (NBC): Charlie Jones (play–by–play) and Len Dawson (color commentator)

Team	Category	Player	Statistics
HOU	Passing	Dan Pastorini	15/29, 200 YDS, 1 TD, 1 INT
HOU	Rushing	Earl Campbell	24 CAR, 74 YDS, 1 TD
HOU	Receiving	Mike Barber; Rob Carpenter	4 REC, 54 YDS; 4 REC, 39 YDS
NE	Passing	Steve Grogan	9/18, 130 YDS, 2 INTs
NE	Rushing	Sam Cunningham	16 CAR, 87 YDS
NE	Receiving	Sam Cunningham; Andy Johnson	3 REC, 45 YDS; 3 REC, 23 YDS

Scoring summary

Quarter	Time	Drive			Team	Scoring information	Score	
Quarter	Time	Plays	Yards	TOP	Team	Scoring information	HOU	NE
1					Patriots	32-yard field goal by Posey	0	3
1					Patriots	34-yard field goal by Posey	0	6
2					Patriots	Ivory 3-yard touchdown run, Posey kick good	0	13
2					Patriots	37-yard field goal by Posey	0	16
2					Patriots	Grogan 8-yard touchdown run, Posey kick good	0	23
2					Oilers	Carpenter 8-yard touchdown run, Fritsch kick good	7	23
3					Oilers	Carpenter 1-yard touchdown run, Fritsch kick good	14	23
4					Oilers	Campbell 1-yard touchdown run, Fritsch kick no good	20	23
4					Oilers	Caster 10-yard touchdown reception from Pastorini, Fritsch kick no good	26	23
"TOP" = time of possession. For other American football terms, see Glossary of American football.							26	23

- Point spread: Oilers +7
- Over/under:
- Time of game:

Oilers	Game statistics	Patriots
24	First downs	16
46–128	Rushes–yards	35–144
200	Passing yards	130
15–28–1	Passes	9–18–2
1–6	Sacked–yards	0–0
194	Net passing yards	130
394	Total yards	274
99	Return yards	125
3–34.7	Punts	0–0.0
3–3	Fumbles–lost	3–2
5–30	Penalties–yards	2–10
	Time of Possession	

=== Week 12 (Monday, November 20, 1978): vs. Miami Dolphins ===
Week 12: Miami Dolphins 30 at Houston Oilers 35 – Game summary

Quarter	1	2	3	4	Total
Dolphins (8–4)	7	7	7	9	30
Oilers (8–4)	7	7	7	14	35

at Astrodome • Houston, Texas

- Date: November 20, 1978
- Game time: 8:00 p.m. CST
- Game weather: Indoors (dome)
- Game attendance: 50,290
- Referee: Gene Barth
- TV announcers (ABC): Frank Gifford (play–by–play) and Howard Cosell (color commentator)

Team	Category	Player	Statistics
MIA	Passing	Bob Griese	23/33, 349 YDS, 2 TDs, 1 INT
MIA	Rushing	Delvin Williams	18 CAR, 73 YDS, 1 TD
MIA	Receiving	Nat Moore	3 REC, 84 YDS, 1 TD
HOU	Passing	Dan Pastorini	10/15, 156 YDS, 1 TD
HOU	Rushing	Earl Campbell	28 CAR, 199 YDS, 4 TDs
HOU	Receiving	Mike Barber	3 REC, 56 YDS, 1 TD

Scoring summary

Quarter	Time	Drive			Team	Scoring information	Score	
Quarter	Time	Plays	Yards	TOP	Team	Scoring information	MIA	HOU
1	10:10	9	82	4:50	Dolphins	Moore 10-yard touchdown reception from Griese, Yepremian kick good	7	0
1	3:32	9	70	2:59	Oilers	Campbell 1-yard touchdown run, Fritsch kick good	7	7
2	4:45	7	87	3:40	Oilers	Barber 15-yard touchdown reception from Pastorini, Fritsch kick good	7	14
2	0:21	11	59	4:24	Dolphins	Williams 1-yard touchdown run, Yepremian kick good	14	14
3	11:52	7	63	3:08	Oilers	Campbell 6-yard touchdown run, Fritsch kick good	14	21
3	2:27	10	89	5:20	Dolphins	Harris 1-yard touchdown run, Yepremian kick good	21	21
4	12:20	—	—	—	Dolphins	Pastorini tackled in end zone for a safety by Duhe	23	21
4	4:46	11	80	6:18	Oilers	Campbell 12-yard touchdown run, Fritsch kick good	23	28
4	1:11	5	93	1:54	Oilers	Campbell 81-yard touchdown run, Fritsch kick good	23	35
4	0:00	5	75	1:11	Dolphins	Cefalo 11-yard touchdown reception from Griese, Yepremian kick good	30	35
"TOP" = time of possession. For other American football terms, see Glossary of American football.							30	35

- Point spread:
- Over/under:
- Time of game:

Dolphins	Game statistics	Oilers
	First downs	
	Rushes–yards	
	Passing yards	
	Passes	
	Sacked–yards	
	Net passing yards	
	Total yards	
	Return yards	
	Punts	
	Fumbles–lost	
	Penalties–yards	
	Time of Possession	

=== Week 14 (Sunday, December 3, 1978): vs. Pittsburgh Steelers ===
Week 14: Pittsburgh Steelers 13 at Houston Oilers 3 – Game summary

Quarter	1	2	3	4	Total
Steelers (12–2)	3	0	3	7	13
Oilers (9–5)	0	3	0	0	3

at Astrodome • Houston, Texas

- Date: December 3, 1978
- Game time: 3:00 p.m. CST
- Game weather: Indoors (dome)
- Game attendance: 54,261
- Referee: Pat Haggerty
- TV announcers (NBC): Sam Nover (play–by–play) and Bob Trumpy (color commentator)

Team	Category	Player	Statistics
PIT	Passing	Terry Bradshaw	11/24, 97 YDS, 1 TD, 1 INT
PIT	Rushing	Franco Harris	27 CAR, 102 YDS
PIT	Receiving	Randy Grossman; Franco Harris	4 REC, 36 YDS; 4 REC, 20 YDS
HOU	Passing	Dan Pastorini	10/27, 91 YDS, 3 INTs
HOU	Rushing	Ronnie Coleman	15 CAR, 45 YDS
HOU	Receiving	Ken Burrough	3 REC, 19 YDS

Scoring summary

Quarter	Time	Drive			Team	Scoring information	Score	
Quarter	Time	Plays	Yards	TOP	Team	Scoring information	PIT	HOU
1					Steelers	41-yard field goal by Gerela	3	0
2					Oilers	37-yard field goal by Fritsch	3	3
3					Steelers	23-yard field goal by Gerela	6	3
4					Steelers	Stallworth 5-yard touchdown reception from Bradshaw, Gerela kick good	13	3
"TOP" = time of possession. For other American football terms, see Glossary of American football.							13	3

- Point spread: Oilers –2½
- Over/under:
- Time of game:

Steelers	Game statistics	Oilers
17	First downs	9
48–177	Rushes–yards	26–81
97	Passing yards	91
11–24–1	Passes	10–27–3
2–23	Sacked–yards	1–8
74	Net passing yards	83
251	Total yards	164
106	Return yards	128
5–47.8	Punts	5–40.2
1–1	Fumbles–lost	4–3
7–60	Penalties–yards	5–35
	Time of Possession	

=== Week 15 (Sunday, December 10, 1978): at New Orleans Saints ===
Week 15: Houston Oilers 17 at New Orleans Saints 12 – Game summary

Quarter	1	2	3	4	Total
Oilers (10–5)	7	3	0	7	17
Saints (6–9)	0	0	7	5	12

at Louisiana Superdome • New Orleans, Louisiana

- Date: December 10, 1978
- Game time: 1:00 p.m. CST
- Game weather: Indoors (dome)
- Game attendance: 63,169
- Referee: Ben Dreith
- TV announcers (NBC): Marv Albert (play–by–play) and Ed Podolak (color commentator)

Team	Category	Player	Statistics
HOU	Passing		
HOU	Rushing		
HOU	Receiving		
NO	Passing		
NO	Rushing		
NO	Receiving		

Scoring summary

Quarter	Time	Drive			Team	Scoring information	Score	
Quarter	Time	Plays	Yards	TOP	Team	Scoring information	HOU	NO
1					Oilers	Campbell 2-yard touchdown run, Fritsch kick good	7	0
2					Oilers	22-yard field goal by Fritsch	10	0
3					Saints	Owens 6-yard touchdown reception from Manning, Mike-Mayer kick good	10	7
4					Oilers	Woods 80-yard touchdown reception from Pastorini, Fritsch kick good	17	7
4					Saints	Campbell ran out of end zone for a safety	17	9
4					Saints	21-yard field goal by Mike-ayer	17	12
"TOP" = time of possession. For other American football terms, see Glossary of American football.							17	12

- Point spread:
- Over/under:
- Time of game:

Oilers	Game statistics	Saints
	First downs	
	Rushes–yards	
	Passing yards	
	Passes	
	Sacked–yards	
	Net passing yards	
	Total yards	
	Return yards	
	Punts	
	Fumbles–lost	
	Penalties–yards	
	Time of Possession	

== Postseason ==
=== Playoffs ===
Round	Date	Opponent	Time	TV	Result	Venue	Attendance	Recap
Wild Card	December 24	at (4) Miami Dolphins	3:00 p.m. CST	NBC	W 17–9	Miami Orange Bowl	70,036	Recap
Divisional	December 31	at (2) New England Patriots	12 Noon CST	NBC	W 31–14	Schaefer Stadium	60,881	Recap
AFC Championship	January 7	at (1) Pittsburgh Steelers	12 Noon CST	NBC	L 5–34	Three Rivers Stadium	49,417	Recap

=== 1978 AFC Wild Card Playoffs (Sunday, December 24, 1978): at (A4) Miami Dolphins ===
1978 AFC Wild Card Playoffs: Houston Oilers 17 at Miami Dolphins 9 – Game summary

Quarter	1	2	3	4	Total
Oilers (1–0)	7	0	0	10	17
Dolphins (0–1)	7	0	0	2	9

at Miami Orange Bowl • Miami, Florida

- Date: December 24, 1978
- Game time: 3:00 p.m. CST
- Game weather: 77 °F or 25 °C, relative humidity 78%, wind 12 miles per hour (19 km/h; 10 kn)
- Game attendance: 70,036
- Referee: Dick Jorgensen
- TV announcers (NBC): Dick Enberg (play–by–play), Len Dawson (color commentator) and Mike Adamle (sideline reporter)

Team	Category	Player	Statistics
HOU	Passing		
HOU	Rushing		
HOU	Receiving		
MIA	Passing		
MIA	Rushing		
MIA	Receiving		

Scoring summary

Quarter	Time	Drive			Team	Scoring information	Score	
Quarter	Time	Plays	Yards	TOP	Team	Scoring information	HOU	MIA
1	5:02	2	21	0:50	Dolphins	Tillman 13-yard touchdown reception from Griese, Yepremian kick good	0	7
1	0:03	10	71	4:59	Oilers	Wilson 13-yard touchdown reception from Pastorini, Fritsch kick good	7	7
4	7:25	10	53	5:18	Oilers	35-yard field goal by Fritsch	10	7
4	1:55	10	50	5:10	Oilers	Campbell 1-yard touchdown run, Fritsch kick good	17	7
4	0:11	—	—	—	Dolphins	Pastorini ran out of end zone	17	9
"TOP" = time of possession. For other American football terms, see Glossary of American football.							17	9

- Point spread:
- Over/under:
- Time of game:

Oilers	Game statistics	Dolphins
	First downs	
	Rushes–yards	
	Passing yards	
	Passes	
	Sacked–yards	
	Net passing yards	
	Total yards	
	Return yards	
	Punts	
	Fumbles–lost	
	Penalties–yards	
	Time of Possession	

Quarterback Dan Pastorini led the Oilers to an upset victory by passing for 306 yards. Houston outgained the Dolphins in total yards, 455-209, and forced 5 turnovers while only losing one on their end.

Miami managed to keep Houston running back Earl Campbell well contained in the first half, limiting him to just 16 yards on 13 carries, but they were unable to handle the passing attack of Pastorini, who completed 16 of 21 passes for 261 yards during that time. Meanwhile, Dolphins quarterback Bob Griese completed just 6 of 16 passes in the first two quarters.

The Dolphins scored first after Earnie Rhone recovered a fumbled punt from Robert Woods at the Houston 21-yard line, setting up quarterback Bob Griese's 13-yard touchdown pass to tight end Andre Tillman. However, the Oilers responded with an 11-play, 71-yard drive in which Pastorini completed 6 of 7 passes for 66 yards, the last one a 13-yard touchdown pass to running back Tim Wilson. Neither team scored again until the fourth quarter, despite several chances. In the second quarter, Pastorini completed a 55-yard pass to tight end Mike Barber on the Dolphins 9-yard line, but the drive ended with no points when Toni Fritsch's 28-yard field goal attempt was blocked by linebacker Kim Bokamper. The Oilers later drove to the Dolphins red zone with 14 seconds left in the half. On the next play, Pastorini completed a pass to Ken Burrough, but he was tackled short of the end zone and the clock ran out before the team could spike the ball to stop it.

In the third quarter, Miami blew a chance to take then lead when Garo Yepremian drove a 38-yard field goal attempt wide left. In the final period, Toni Fritsch made a 35-yard field goal to give the Oilers a 10-7 lead. Then linebacker Gregg Bingham intercepted a pass from Griese and returned it 4 yards to midfield. Campbell finally managed to get into gear with a 20-yard run on the ensuing drive, and eventually finished it off with a 1-yard rushing touchdown. The Dolphins closed out the scoring, but only when Pastorini ran out of the end zone for an intentional safety to run out the clock.

Despite his poor first half, Campbell finished the game with 84 rushing yards and a 13-yard reception. Wilson rushed for 76 yards and caught 5 passes for 40. Barber had 112 yards on 4 receptions, while Burroughs caught 6 passes for 103. Griese finished the game just 11/28 for 114 yards, with a touchdown and two interceptions.

This was the first postseason meeting between the Oilers and Dolphins.

=== 1978 AFC Divisional Playoffs (Sunday, December 31, 1978): at (A2) New England Patriots ===
1978 AFC Divisional Playoffs: Houston Oilers 31 at New England Patriots 14 – Game summary

Quarter	1	2	3	4	Total
Oilers (2–0)	0	21	3	7	31
Patriots (0–1)	0	0	7	7	14

at Schaefer Stadium • Foxborough, Massachusetts

- Date: December 31, 1978
- Game time: 12:00 Noon CST
- Game weather: 36 °F or 2.2 °C, relative humidity 70%, wind 8 miles per hour (13 km/h; 7.0 kn), wind chill 30 °F or −1.1 °C
- Game attendance: 60,881
- Referee: Gordon McCarter
- TV announcers (NBC): Charlie Jones (play–by–play), Len Dawson (color commentator) and Mike Adamle (sideline reporter)

Team	Category	Player	Statistics
HOU	Passing	Dan Pastorini	12/15, 200 YDS, 3 TDs, 1 INT
HOU	Rushing	Earl Campbell	27 CAR, 118 YDS, 1 TD
HOU	Receiving	Mike Barber	5 REC, 83 YDS, 2 TDs
NE	Passing	Tom Owen	12/22, 144 YDS, 1 TD, 1 INT
NE	Rushing	Sam Cunningham	10 CAR, 42 YDS
NE	Receiving	Russ Francis	8 REC, 101 YDS, 1 TD

Scoring summary

Quarter	Time	Drive			Team	Scoring information	Score	
Quarter	Time	Plays	Yards	TOP	Team	Scoring information	HOU	NE
2	13:25				Oilers	Burrough 71-yard touchdown reception from Pastorini, Fritsch kick good	7	0
2	6:48				Oilers	Barber 19-yard touchdown reception from Pastorini, Fritsch kick good	14	0
2	0:25				Oilers	Barber 13-yard touchdown reception from Pastorini, Fritsch kick good	21	0
3	7:04				Oilers	30-yard field goal by Fritsch	24	0
3	0:17				Patriots	Jackson 24-yard touchdown reception from Johnson, Posey kick good	24	7
4	9:17				Patriots	Francis 24-yard touchdown reception from Owen, Posey kick good	24	14
4	3:41				Oilers	Campbell 2-yard touchdown run, Fritsch kick good	31	14
"TOP" = time of possession. For other American football terms, see Glossary of American football.							31	14

- Point spread: Oilers +6
- Over/under:
- Time of game:

Oilers	Game statistics	Patriots
21	First downs	15
54–174	Rushes–yards	20–83
200	Passing yards	206
12–15–1	Passes	16–35–3
3–30	Sacked–yards	4–26
170	Net passing yards	180
344	Total yards	263
105	Return yards	142
5–34.8	Punts	4–43.3
1–0	Fumbles–lost	2–0
2–25	Penalties–yards	8–92
33:06	Time of Possession	26:54

Quarterback Dan Pastorini led the Oilers to a victory by throwing for 200 yards and three touchdowns, while running back Earl Campbell rushed for 118 yards and a score.

After a scoreless first quarter, Houston completely took over the game. Houston receiver Ken Burrough caught a pass from Pastorini at the Pats 40-yard, broke through coverage from Mike Haynes, and took off for a 71-yard touchdown reception. Raymond Clayborn's 47-yard kickoff return gave the Patriots a chance to strike back, but two plays later, Steve Grogan's pass on a flea flicker play was intercepted by Mike Reinfeldt on the Oilers 1-yard line. Aided by an unnecessary roughness penalty that gave them a first down after failing to convert a 3rd down on their own 7-yard line, Houston drove 99 yards to score on Pastorini's 19-yard touchdown pass to tight end Mike Barber. Again, the Patriots seemed ready to respond, driving to the Oilers 23-yard line, but again they came up short due to Reinfeldt, who intercepted another pass from Grogan to end the drive. Reinfeldt's 27-yard return and another unnecessary roughness penalty against New England gave the Oilers a first down on the Patriots 49-yard line. Pastorini completed a 22-yard pass to Barder, and eventually got his team a 21-0 lead with a 13-yard touchdown pass to Barber at the end of the possession.

Pastorini finished the first half with 10 of 12 completions for 184 yards and 3 touchdowns. He threw only two passes in the second half, both completions. Meanwhile, Grogan was benched with 18 seconds left in the half, having completed only 3 of 12 passes for 38 yards.

A 30-yard field goal by Toni Fritsch gave the Oilers a 24-0 third quarter lead before New England managed a comeback. First they drove 75 yards to score on Andy Johnson's 24-yard halfback option play pass to receiver Harold Jackson. Then in the fourth quarter, they took advantage of a short field due to a poor punt by Cliff Parsley, scoring on Tom Owen's 24-yard touchdown pass to tight end Russ Francis that cut their deficit to 24-14. However, their efforts were dashed on their drive when linebacker Gregg Bingham intercepted an Owen pass and returned it 19 yards to the Patriot 18-yard line, setting up Campbell's 2-yard touchdown run to put the game away.

Francis caught 8 passes for 101 yards and a touchdown.

This was the Patriots only playoff loss at Foxboro Stadium. They did not lose another home playoff game again until 31 years later, seven years after Gillette Stadium opened.

This was the first postseason meeting between the Oilers and Patriots.

=== 1978 AFC Championship Game (Sunday, January 7, 1979): at (A1) Pittsburgh Steelers ===
1978 AFC Championship Game: Houston Oilers 5 at Pittsburgh Steelers 34 – Game summary

Quarter	1	2	3	4	Total
Oilers (2–1)	0	3	2	0	5
Steelers (2–0)	14	17	3	0	34

at Three Rivers Stadium • Pittsburgh, Pennsylvania

- Date: January 7, 1979
- Game time: 12:00 Noon CST
- Game weather: 27 °F or −2.8 °C, freezing rain
- Game attendance: 49,417
- Referee: Jim Tunney
- TV announcers (NBC): Curt Gowdy (play–by–play), John Brodie (color commentator), Merlin Olsen (color commentator) and Mike Adamle (sideline reporter)

Team	Category	Player	Statistics
HOU	Passing	Dan Pastorini	12/26, 90 YDS, 5 INTs
HOU	Rushing	Earl Campbell	22 CAR, 62 YDS
HOU	Receiving	Rich Caster; Tim Wilson	5 REC, 44 YDS; 5 REC, 31 YDS
PIT	Passing	Terry Bradshaw	11/19, 200 YDS, 2 TDs, 2 INTs
PIT	Rushing	Franco Harris	20 CAR, 51 YDS, 1 TD
PIT	Receiving	Lynn Swann; Rocky Bleier	4 REC, 98 YDS, 1 TD; 4 REC, 42 YDS

Scoring summary

Quarter	Time	Drive			Team	Scoring information	Score	
Quarter	Time	Plays	Yards	TOP	Team	Scoring information	HOU	PIT
1	10:02				Steelers	Harris 7-yard touchdown run, Gerela kick good	0	7
1	1:09				Steelers	Bleier 15-yard touchdown run, Gerela kick good	0	14
2	9:39				Oilers	19-yard field goal by Fritsch	3	14
2	0:52				Steelers	Swann 29-yard touchdown reception from Bradshaw, Gerela kick good	3	21
2	0:33				Steelers	Stallworth 17-yard touchdown reception from Bradshaw, Gerela kick good	3	28
2	0:04				Steelers	37-yard field goal by Gerela	3	31
3	7:46				Steelers	22-yard field goal by Gerela	3	34
3	3:50				Oilers	Bleier tackled in end zone for a safety by Washington	5	34
"TOP" = time of possession. For other American football terms, see Glossary of American football.							5	34

- Point spread: Oilers +7
- Over/under:
- Time of game:

Oilers	Game statistics	Steelers
10	First downs	21
26–72	Rushes–yards	47–179
96	Passing yards	200
12–26–5	Passes	11–19–2
4–26	Sacked–yards	0–0
70	Net passing yards	200
142	Total yards	379
189	Return yards	217
6–39.5	Punts	1–53.0
6–4	Fumbles–lost	6–3
5–48	Penalties–yards	4–32
18:15	Time of Possession	41:45

On a wet, slick, and slippery field, the Steelers dominated the Oilers by forcing 9 turnovers and only allowing 5 points. Pittsburgh took the early lead by driving 57 yards to score on running back Franco Harris' 7-yard touchdown run. Then, linebacker Jack Ham recovered a fumble at the Houston 17-yard line, which led to running back Rocky Bleier's 15-yard rushing touchdown.

In the second quarter, a 19-yard field goal by Oilers kicker Toni Fritsch cut the score 14–3, but then the Steelers scored 17 points during the last 48 seconds of the second quarter. First, Houston running back Ronnie Coleman lost a fumble, and moments later Pittsburgh wide receiver Lynn Swann caught a 29-yard touchdown reception. Then Johnnie Dirden fumbled the ensuing kickoff, which led to Steelers wide receiver John Stallworth's 17-yard reception. After the Oilers got the ball back, Coleman fumbled again, and Roy Gerela kicked a field goal to increase Pittsburgh's lead, 31–3. Houston never posed a threat for the rest of the game as they turned over the ball four times in their six second-half possessions.

This was the first postseason meeting between the Oilers and Steelers.

== Milestones and records ==
- Earl Campbell, NFL Rushing Leader, (1,450)
- Earl Campbell, NFL Offensive Rookie of the Year
- Earl Campbell, PFWA NFL MVP
- Earl Campbell, NEA NFL MVP
- Earl Campbell, NFL Offensive Player of the Year
- Earl Campbell, UPI AFL-AFC Player of the Year
- Earl Campbell, 1st 1,000 yard rushing season
- Earl Campbell, 1st NFL rushing title
