= Texans–Titans rivalry =

National Football League rivalry

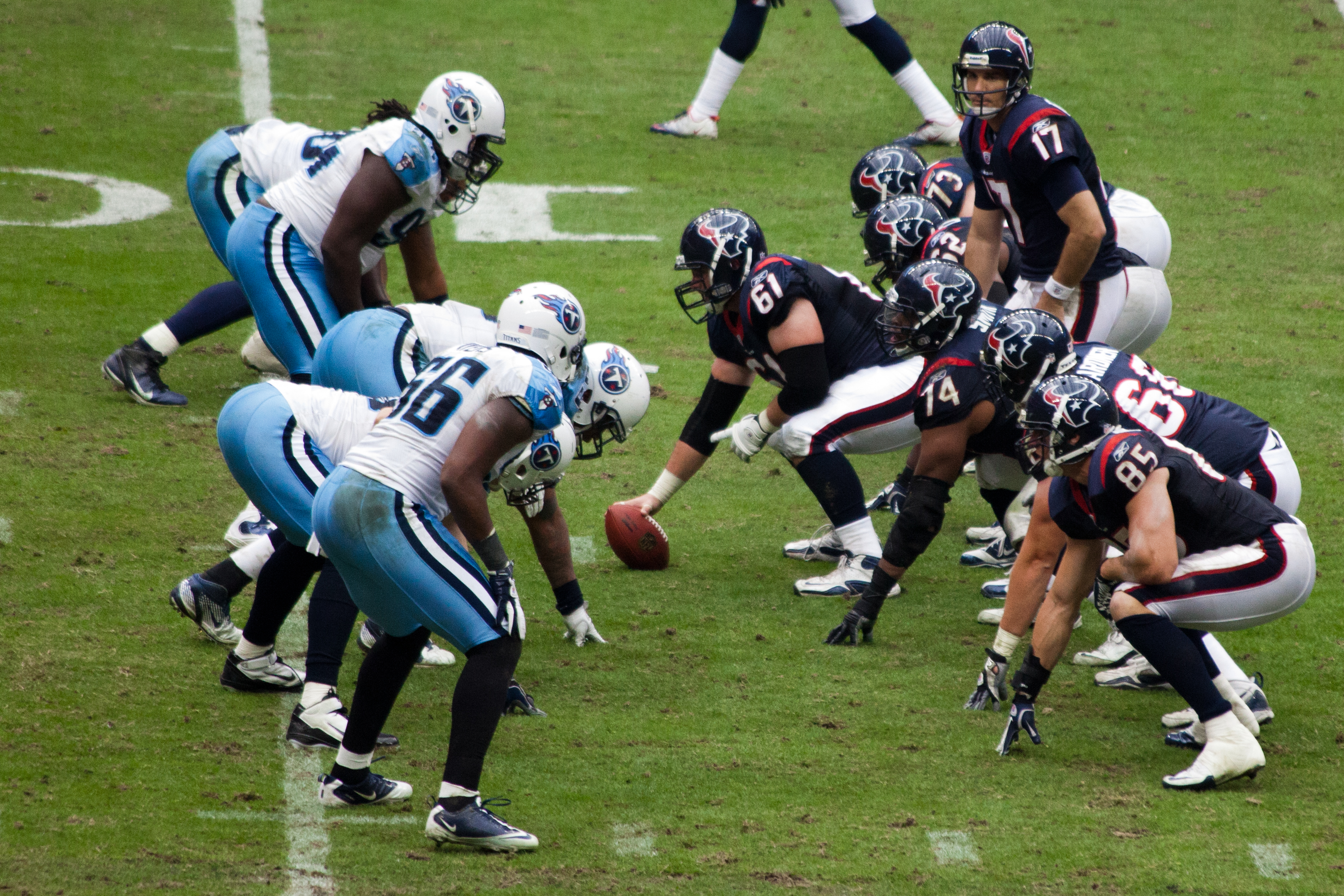
- Texans and Titans face off during the 2011 season.

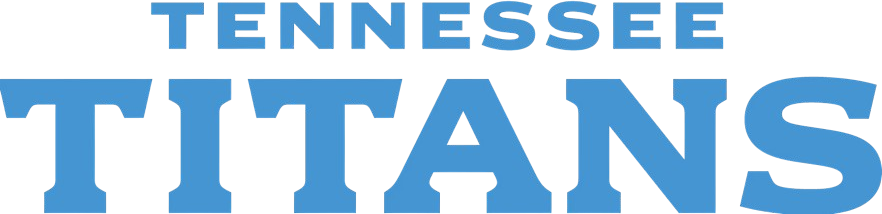
- Houston Texans Tennessee Titans
- Location: Houston, Nashville
- First meeting: November 10, 2002; Titans 17, Texans 10
- Latest meeting: October 11, 2026; Texans 26, Titans 3
- Next meeting: January 9/10, 2027
- Stadiums: Texans: NRG Stadium; Titans: Nissan Stadium

Statistics
- Total meetings: 49
- All-time series: Texans: 25–24
- Largest victory: Texans: 57–14 (2017); Titans: 38–17 (2003), 35–14 (2019)
- Most points scored: Texans: 57 (2017); Titans: 42 (2020)
- Longest win streak: Texans: 5 (2014–2016); Titans: 7 (2005–2008)
- Current win streak: Texans: 4 (2024–present)

The Texans–Titans rivalry is a National Football League (NFL) rivalry between the Houston Texans and Tennessee Titans.

The Titans franchise began as the Houston Oilers before relocating to Tennessee in the 1997 season, leaving Houston without an NFL team. The team was renamed the Tennessee Titans in 1999. In 2002, the NFL awarded Houston an expansion team, the Houston Texans, and established the AFC South division as part of league realignment. Both the Texans and Titans were placed in the new division, resulting in two annual meetings between Houston’s new franchise and the successor to its former team. During the 2000s, the Titans held the early advantage in the series. In subsequent years, the Texans became more competitive, leading to a more balanced rivalry and a closely contested overall series record.

The Texans lead the overall series, 25–24. The two teams have not met in the playoffs.

== Background ==
The Tennessee Titans were initially established as a Houston-based franchise known as the "Houston Oilers," debuting in the first season of the American Football League (AFL) in 1960. Despite achieving playoff success and featuring Hall of Fame players, the Oilers were unable to reach the Super Bowl. Bud Adams, the team's owner, expressed dissatisfaction with the Astrodome, considering it outdated, and sought a new stadium. In 1995, following unsuccessful negotiations, he opted to relocate the Oilers to Nashville, Tennessee, where they were rebranded as the Tennessee Titans. Houston was without an NFL team until the 2002 season when the league declared the return of football to the city with the establishment of the Houston Texans. Additionally, the NFL introduced realignments to its two conferences with each having North, South, East and West divisions. In the newly formed AFC South, the NFL placed the Houston Texans, Tennessee Titans, Jacksonville Jaguars, and Indianapolis Colts. Consequently, the Texans and Titans were scheduled to face each other twice annually: once in Houston and once in Nashville.

== History ==
=== 2010s ===
The bitterness of the rivalry has led to fistfights between the teams during games. One notable fight was on November 28, 2010, when Texans wide receiver Andre Johnson and Titans cornerback Cortland Finnegan exchanged blows after a play and were ejected. The Texans won that game 20–0.

The rivalry became more competitive in 2011 as both teams were in the hunt for the division title most of the year. In Week 7, the Titans hosted the Texans in a match-up for the division lead and was the home field favorite while Houston was coming off of a 2-game losing streak. The Texans won 41–7 and went on to win the division that year. In Week 17, Houston hosted Tennessee; the Titans had to win to keep their playoff hopes alive. The Titans won on a botched two-point conversion try by the Texans, who were trying for the win. However, they were eliminated from postseason contention due to the Denver Broncos losing against the Kansas City Chiefs 7–3. Had Tennessee qualified to play in the NFL playoffs, they would have played the Texans in the AFC Wild-Card round.

In 2018, the Texans won the AFC South at 11–5, and split with Tennessee. The Texans would play either the Titans or Colts in the upcoming Wild Card game, depending on the Sunday Night Football winner between the two. The Colts won 33–17, eliminating the Titans from the playoffs at 9–7 and setting up a wild-card match between the Texans and Colts. Had the Titans won, it would've been the first meeting in the playoffs between the two teams, similar to 2011.

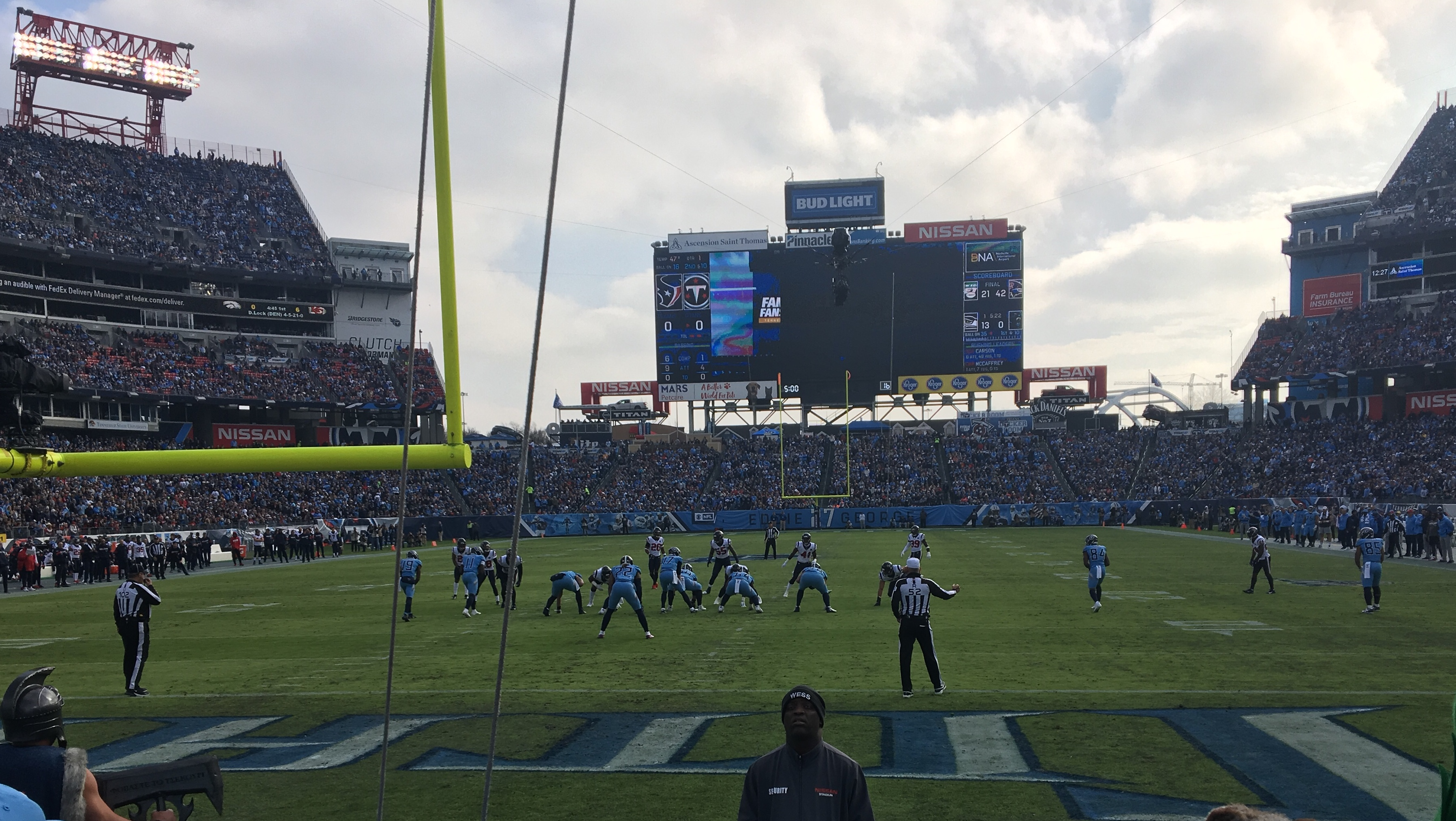
The Texans vs. the Titans at Nissan Stadium in Week 15, 2019.

In 2019, the Texans Week 15 road game against Titans marked the first time that both teams were 8–5 at the same time. The Texans beat the Titans 24–21, and in Week 16 the Texans won the AFC South after beating the Tampa Bay Buccaneers 23–20. In the final week of regular season, the Titans faced the Texans on the road. The Titans needed to win the game or a Pittsburgh Steelers loss against the Baltimore Ravens in order to make the playoffs. Behind a 211-yard, three-touchdown day from running back Derrick Henry and the Texans resting starters, the Titans won 35–14 to clinch the sixth seed in the playoffs.

=== 2020s ===
The most competitive games in the history of the rivalry came in 2020. On October 18, the Texans traveled to Nissan Stadium under interim coach Romeo Crennel, taking over for the fired Bill O'Brien. The Texans erased a 21–7 gap to lead 36–29, but the Titans stormed down and scored with seven seconds left. In overtime the Titans got first possession and advanced 82 yards on six plays ending in a direct snap touchdown run by Derrick Henry. In the second meeting of the 2020 season, Sam Sloman kicked a 37-yard field goal that bounced off the right upright and in to give Tennessee the 41–38 win. This was the highest-scoring game (79 points) in the history of the rivalry after the previous game set the record at 78 points.

==== Titans uniform controversy ====
For years, the Houston Texans had sought to regain the intellectual property of the former Houston Oilers name, logo, and uniforms. However, Titans owner Bud Adams and his daughter, current owner Amy Adams Strunk, repeatedly blocked these requests. The issue escalated in 2022, when the Titans announced the team was planning to wear their former Houston/Tennessee Oilers throwback uniforms for select games in the 2023 season. Many Houston fans argued that the uniforms belonged to Houston, but the Titans were able to wear the uniforms as they still retained the Oilers' history and name, as Amy Adams Strunk told owners "Oilers history is Titans history". In October 2023, days before the Titans planned to wear the uniforms for the first time in their Week 8 game against the Atlanta Falcons, former Texans defensive end J. J. Watt expressed displeasure about the Titans' plans on The Pat McAfee Show, stating: "Having lived in Houston for 10 years and the people there and the connection that they have to Earl Campbell, to Warren Moon, to these guys that wore those...when they played in that Astrodome...it hurts to not have been able to wear those in Houston and it hurts to see them being worn somewhere else." The Titans also wore the uniforms in their home games against the Texans for the 2023 and 2024 seasons, with the Texans winning both games.

After making changes to their primary uniform set following the 2024 season, the Titans announced that they would no longer wear the Oilers throwback uniforms. In 2026, the Titans unveiled new uniforms which directly drew inspiration from the classic Oilers uniforms. In response to the Titans wearing Oilers uniforms, the Texans in 2024 unveiled an alternate navy uniform which featured "H-Town blue" as an accent color, and in 2026, added a "Rivalries" uniform which was a blatant nod to the Oilers. "H-Town blue", while inspired by Houston's historic street tiles and police cars, was perceived as being too similar to the Titans' Columbia blue shade.

== Connections between the teams ==
Name	Position(s)	Titans' tenure	Texans' tenure
Gary Walker	Defensive end	1995–1998	2002–2005
Robaire Smith	Defensive tackle	2000–2003; 2006	2004–2005
Chris Brown	Running back	2003–2007	2008–2009
Jason Babin	Defensive end	2010	2004–2006
Andre Johnson	Wide receiver	2016	2003–2014
Jadeveon Clowney	Defensive end	2020	2014–2018
Johnathan Joseph	Cornerback	2020	2011–2019
DeAndre Hopkins	Wide receiver	2023–2024	2013–2019
Azeez Al-Shaair	Linebacker	2023	2024–present

== Season-by-season results ==
Houston Texans vs. Tennessee Titans Season-by-Season Results
2000s (Titans, 12–4)

Season	Season series	at Houston Texans	at Tennessee Titans	Overall series	Notes
2002	Titans 2–0	Titans; 13–3	Titans; 17–10	Titans; 2–0	Texans join the National Football League (NFL) as an expansion team. During the NFL realignment, the Texans and Titans are placed in the newly created AFC South in the American Football Conference (AFC), resulting in two meetings annually. Titans make their first visit back to Houston since departing in the 1996 season when they were known as the Houston Oilers.
2003	Titans 2–0	Titans; 27–24	Titans; 38–17	Titans; 4–0	In Tennessee, Titans recorded their largest victory against the Texans with a 21–point differential.
2004	Texans 2–0	Texans; 31–21	Texans; 20–10	Titans; 4–2	In Houston, Texans overcame a 21–3 deficit.
2005	Titans 2–0	Titans; 34–20	Titans; 13–10	Titans; 6–2	
2006	Titans 2–0	Titans; 26–20 (OT)	Titans; 28–22	Titans; 8–2	
2007	Titans 2–0	Titans; 38–36	Titans; 28–20	Titans; 10–2	In Houston, Titans' K Rob Bironas successfully converted eight field goal attempts, setting an NFL record.
2008	Tie 1–1	Texans; 13–12	Titans; 31–12	Titans; 11–3	Titans win 7 straight meetings (2005–2008), currently the longest win streak in the series for either team.
2009	Tie 1–1	Titans; 20–17	Texans; 34–31	Titans; 12–4	

2010s (Texans, 13–7)

Season	Season series	at Houston Texans	at Tennessee Titans	Overall series	Notes
2010	Tie 1–1	Texans; 20–0	Titans; 31–17	Titans; 13–5	In Houston, Texans' WR Andre Johnson and Titans' CB Cortland Finnegan got into an altercation, which resulted in both getting ejected and fined.
2011	Tie 1–1	Titans; 23–22	Texans; 41–7	Titans; 14–6	
2012	Texans 2–0	Texans; 38–14	Texans; 24–10	Titans; 14–8	
2013	Tie 1–1	Texans; 30–24 (OT)	Titans; 16–10	Titans; 15–9	Texans' win would be their last win in their 2013 season and only home win, as they went on a 14-game losing streak.
2014	Texans 2–0	Texans; 45–21	Texans; 30–16	Titans; 15–11	
2015	Texans 2–0	Texans; 20–6	Texans; 34–6	Titans; 15–13	
2016	Tie 1–1	Texans; 27–20	Titans; 24–17	Titans; 16–14	Both teams finished with 9–7 records, but the Texans clinched the AFC South based on a better division record, eliminating the Titans from playoff contention.
2017	Tie 1–1	Texans; 57–14	Titans; 24–13	Titans; 17–15	In Houston, the Texans recorded their largest victory against the Titans with a 43–point differential and set a franchise record for their most points scored in a game.
2018	Tie 1–1	Texans; 34–17	Titans; 20–17	Titans; 18–16	In Houston, the Texans accumulated 281 rushing yards, setting a franchise record for their most rushing yards in a game.
2019	Tie 1–1	Titans; 35–14	Texans; 24–21	Titans; 19–17	In Houston, the Titans tied their largest victory against the Texans with a 21-point differential (2003) and clinched the final playoff berth in the AFC with their win.

2020s (Texans, 8–5)

Season	Season series	at Houston Texans	at Tennessee Titans	Overall series	Notes
2020	Titans 2–0	Titans; 41–38	Titans; 42–36 (OT)	Titans; 21–17	In Tennessee, the Titans scored their most points in a game against the Texans and accumulated 607 total yards, setting a franchise record for their most yards in a game. In Houston, Titans clinch the AFC South for the first time since the 2008 season with their win and achieve their first season series sweep against the Texans since the 2007 season.
2021	Tie 1–1	Titans; 28–25	Texans; 22–13	Titans; 22–18	The Titans clinched home-field advantage throughout the AFC playoffs as the AFC's 1st seed with their win.
2022	Tie 1–1	Titans; 17–10	Texans; 19–14	Titans; 23–19	
2023	Texans 2–0	Texans; 26–3	Texans; 19–16 (OT)	Titans; 23–21	
2024	Tie 1–1	Titans; 32–27	Texans; 23–14	Titans; 24–22	Titans clinched the first overall pick in the 2025 NFL draft with their loss.
2025	Texans 2–0	Texans; 26–0	Texans; 16–13	Tied; 24–24	
2026	Texans 1–0	January 9/10	Texans; 26–3	Texans; 25–24	Texans take the series lead for the first time.

Summary of Results

Season	Season series	at Houston Texans	at Tennessee Titans	Notes
Regular season	Texans 25–24	Tie 12–12	Texans 13–12	

== See also ==
- List of NFL rivalries
- AFC South
