= List of Tennessee Titans first-round draft picks =

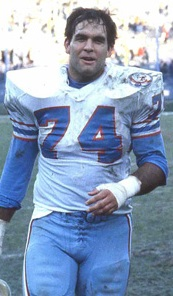
Offensive lineman Bruce Matthews was drafted ninth overall in the 1983 NFL draft and spent his entire career, 19 seasons, with the team. He was a seven-time first-team All-Pro, 14-time Pro Bowler, and won the 2001 Bart Starr Award. In addition to being inducted into the Titans Ring of Honor and having his number retired, he was also inducted into the Pro Football Hall of Fame in 2007 and selected for the NFL 100th Anniversary All-Time Team.

The Tennessee Titans are a professional American football team based in Nashville, Tennessee. The Titans compete in the National Football League (NFL) as a member of the American Football Conference South Division. Founded in 1959 by Houston oil tycoon Bud Adams (who remained the owner until his death in 2013), they were a charter member of the American Football League (AFL) and joined the NFL in 1970 as part of the AFL–NFL merger. The team was originally known as the Houston Oilers and began play in 1960 in Houston, Texas. In 1997, the Oilers relocated to Nashville, Tennessee, playing at the Liberty Bowl Memorial Stadium in Memphis for one season while waiting for a new stadium to be constructed. The team moved to Nashville's Vanderbilt Stadium in 1998. The team was known as the Tennessee Oilers for the 1997 and 1998 seasons. They changed their name to the Tennessee Titans for the 1999 season, when they moved into Adelphia Coliseum (now known as Nissan Stadium), where they have played their home games since.

The NFL draft, officially known as the "NFL Annual Player Selection Meeting", is an annual event which serves as the league's most common source of player recruitment. The draft order is determined based on the previous season's standings; the teams with the worst win–loss records receive the earliest picks. Teams that qualified for the NFL playoffs select after non-qualifiers, and their order depends on how far they advanced, using their regular season record as a tie-breaker. The final two selections in the first round are reserved for the Super Bowl runner-up and champion. Draft picks are tradable and players or other picks can be acquired with them.

Before the merger agreements in 1966, the AFL directly competed with the NFL and held a separate draft. This led to a bidding war over top prospects between the two leagues, along with the subsequent drafting of the same player in each draft. As part of the merger agreement on June 8, 1966, the two leagues began holding a multiple round "common draft". Once the AFL officially merged with the NFL in 1970, the "common draft" simply became the NFL draft. The first AFL draft was held prior to the start of the 1960 season. The first round of the 1960 AFL draft was territorial selections. Each team received a "territorial pick" which allowed them to select a single player within a pre-agreed upon designated region (the team's "territory"). Teams then agreed on the top eight players at each position, who were subsequently assigned to teams by random draw, with each of the eight teams receiving one of those players. This process was repeated until all 53 roster spots were filled. Beginning in the 1961 draft, the AFL, using the same system as the NFL, began to assign picks based on the previous season's standings.

Since the team's first draft, the Titans have selected 64 players in the first round. The team's first-round pick in the inaugural AFL draft was Billy Cannon, a halfback from LSU; he was the team's territorial selection. The Titans have drafted first overall three times, selecting John Matuszak in 1973, Earl Campbell in 1978, and Cam Ward in 2025. In the most recent draft, held in 2026, the Titans chose Ohio State wide receiver Carnell Tate and Auburn defensive end Keldric Faulk.

The Titans did not draft a player in the first round on ten occasions. Five of the team's first-round picks—Robert Brazile, Earl Campbell, Mike Ditka, Bruce Matthews, Mike Munchak—have been elected to the Pro Football Hall of Fame; one of these, Mike Ditka, chose not to play for the team and joined the Chicago Bears of the NFL instead. The team's first-round pick in 1966, Tommy Nobis, also chose to sign with the NFL instead.

== Player selections ==
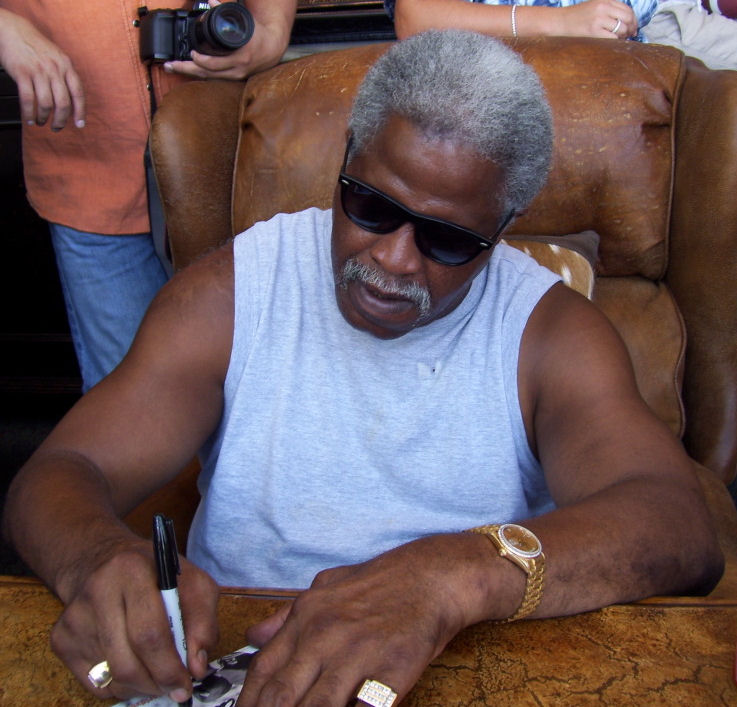
Running back Earl Campbell was selected first overall in the 1978 NFL draft. Campbell spent six full seasons with the team, and a portion of a seventh, during which time he was a three-time first-team All-Pro, five-time Pro Bowler, three-time Offensive Player of the Year, and was the 1979 MVP. He was a first-ballot Pro Football Hall of Famer, was selected to the NFL 100th Anniversary All-Time Team, was inducted into the Titans Ring of Honor, and had his number retired by the team.

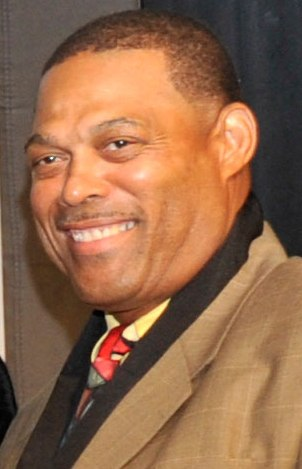
Robert Brazile, a linebacker selected sixth overall in the 1975 NFL draft, spent his entire career with the team. During this time, he was a six-time All-Pro, seven-time Pro Bowler, and was selected for the 1970s All-Decade Team. In 2018, he was inducted into the Pro Football Hall of Fame and the Titans Ring of Honor.

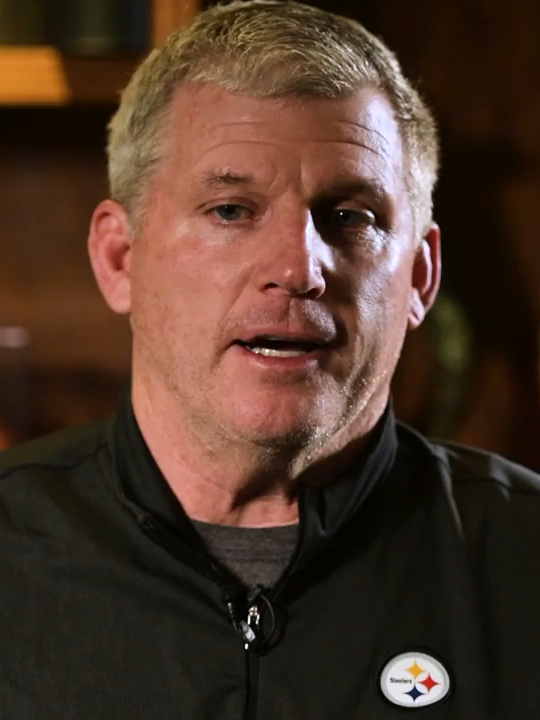
Mike Munchak, a guard drafted in 1982, spent his entire 12 season career with the Oilers. During his time with the team, he was a 10-time All-Pro, nine-time Pro Bowler, and was selected to the 1980s All-Decade Team. He was inducted into the Pro Football Hall of Fame, the Titans Ring of Honor, and had his number retired by the team.

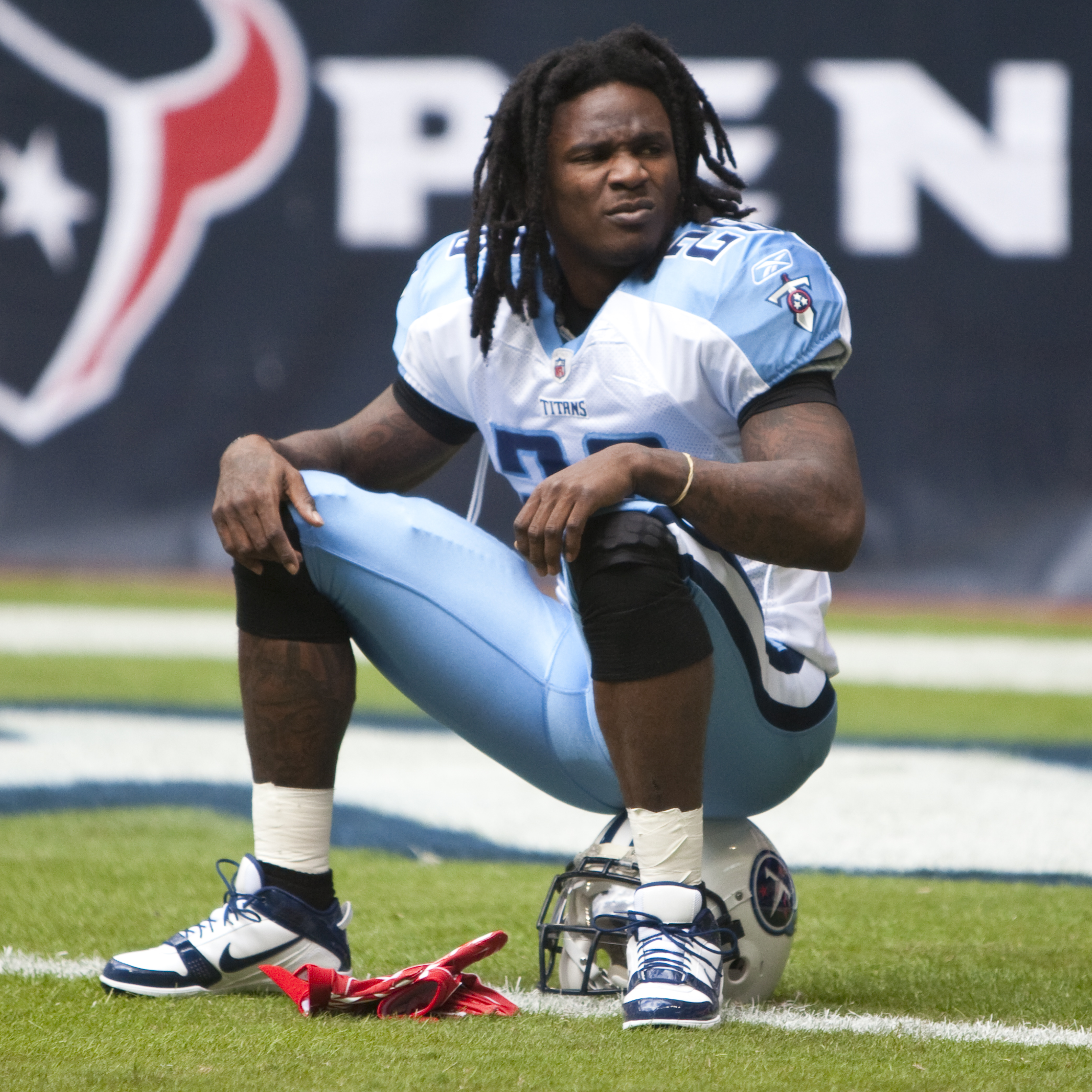
Chris Johnson was a running back drafted 24th overall in the 2008 NFL draft. During Johnson's six seasons with the team, he was a first-team All-Pro, three-time Pro Bowler, and the 2009 Offensive Player of the Year. In 2009, he set the record for most scrimmage yards in a season (2,509) while becoming the sixth player to rush for over 2,000 yards in a season, earning the nickname CJ2K.

Key
Symbol	Meaning
†	Inducted into the Pro Football Hall of Fame
*	Selected number one overall
‡	Selected number one overall and inducted into the Pro Football Hall of Fame

Position abbreviations
CB	Cornerback
DB	Defensive back
DE	Defensive end
DT	Defensive tackle
G	Guard
LB	Linebacker
QB	Quarterback
RB	Running back
T	Tackle
TE	Tight end
WB	Wingback

Tennessee Titans (Note: The Tennessee Titans were previously known as the Houston Oilers (1960–1996) and Tennessee Oilers (1997–1998).) first-round draft picks
Season	Pick	Player	Position	College	Notes
1960	Territorial	Billy Cannon	RB	LSU	First round was territorial selections (Note: The first round of the 1960 AFL draft was territorial selections. Teams were allowed to select a single player from a designated region (their "territory").)
1961	8	Mike Ditka†	TE	Pittsburgh	Signed for the NFL's Chicago Bears instead
1962	7	Ray Jacobs	DT	Howard Payne	
1963	6	Danny Brabham	LB	Arkansas	
1964	6	Scott Appleton	DT	Texas	
1965	2	Larry Elkins	WR	Baylor	Original pick traded to New York Jets. (Note: Tennessee traded their 1965 first-round selection (No. 1 overall) to the New York Jets in exchange for the rights to quarterback Jerry Rhome.) Pick received from Denver Broncos. (Note: Tennessee loaned quarterback Jacky Lee to the Denver Broncos (for the 1964 and 1965 seasons) in exchange for their 1965 first-round selection (No. 2 overall), defensive tackle Bud McFadin, and an unspecified sum of money.)
1966	5	Tommy Nobis	LB	Texas	Signed for the NFL's Atlanta Falcons instead
1967	5	George Webster	LB	Michigan State	
1967	23	Tom Regner	G	Notre Dame	Pick received from Dallas Cowboys (Note: Tennessee allowed the Dallas Cowboys to sign tackle Ralph Neely in exchange for their 1967 first-, second-, and two fifth-round selections (Nos. 23, 49, 119, and 127 overall).)
1968	No pick				Pick traded to Kansas City Chiefs (Note: Tennessee traded their 1968 first-round selection (No. 22 overall), quarterback Jacky Lee, and defensive tackle Ernie Ladd to the Kansas City Chiefs in exchange for quarterback Pete Beathard.)
1969	15	Ron Pritchard	LB	Arizona State	
1970	14	Doug Wilkerson	G	North Carolina Central	
1971	3	Dan Pastorini	QB	Santa Clara	
1972	6	Greg Sampson	T	Stanford	
1973	1	John Matuszak*	DE	Tampa	
1973	14	George Amundson	RB	Iowa State	Pick received from Atlanta Falcons (Note: Tennessee traded defensive tackle Mike Tilleman to the Atlanta Falcons in exchange for their 1973 first-round selection (No. 14 overall).)
1974	No pick				Pick traded to Dallas Cowboys (Note: Tennessee traded their 1974 first- and third-round selections (Nos. 1 and 53 overall) to the Dallas Cowboys in exchange for defensive end Tody Smith and wide receiver Billy Parks.)
1975	6	Robert Brazile†	LB	Jackson State	Pick received from Kansas City Chiefs (Note: Tennessee traded their 1976 third-round selection (No. 79 overall) and John Matuszak to the Kansas City Chiefs in exchange for their 1975 first-round selection (No. 6 overall) and Curley Culp.)
1975	15	Don Hardeman	RB	Texas A&M–Kingsville	
1976	No pick				Pick traded to San Francisco 49ers (Note: Tennessee traded their 1976 first-round selection (No. 21 overall) and 1977 third-round selection (No. 65 overall) to the San Francisco 49ers in exchange for running back Vic Washington.)
1977	11	Morris Towns	T	Missouri	
1978	1	Earl Campbell‡	RB	Texas	Moved up draft order in trade with Tampa Bay Buccaneers (Note: Tennessee traded their 1978 first- and second-round selections (Nos. 17 and 44 overall), 1979 third- and fifth-round selections (Nos. 78 and 133 overall), and tight end Jimmie Giles to the Tampa Bay Buccaneers in exchange for their 1978 first-round selection (No. 1 overall).)
1979	No pick				Moved down draft order in trade with Kansas City Chiefs (Note: Tennessee traded their 1979 first-round selection (No. 23 overall) to the Kansas City Chiefs in exchange for their 1979 second-round selection (No. 31 overall) and 1980 second-round selection (No. 38 overall).)
1980	No pick				Pick traded to New England Patriots (Note: Tennessee traded their 1980 first- and sixth-round selections (Nos. 25 and 160 overall) to the New England Patriots in exchange for tackle Leon Gray.)
1981	No pick				Pick traded to Oakland Raiders (Note: Tennessee traded their 1981 first- and second-round selections (Nos. 21 and 48 overall) and 1982 second-round selection (No. 35 overall) to the Oakland Raiders in exchange for tight end Dave Casper.)
1982	8	Mike Munchak†	G	Penn State	
1983	9	Bruce Matthews†	G	USC	Moved down draft order in trades with Los Angeles Rams (Note: Tennessee traded their 1983 first-round selection (No. 2 overall) to the Los Angeles Rams in exchange for their 1983 first- and fourth-round selections (Nos. 3 and 88 overall) and 1984 fourth-round selection (No. 102 overall).) and Seattle Seahawks (Note: Tennessee traded a 1983 first-round selection (No. 3 overall, received from the Los Angeles Rams) to the Seattle Seahawks in exchange for their 1983 first-, second-, and third-round selections (Nos. 9, 42, and 69 overall).)
1984	2	Dean Steinkuhler	T	Nebraska	
1985	3	Ray Childress	DT	Texas A&M	Moved down draft order in trade with Minnesota Vikings (Note: Tennessee traded their 1985 first-round selection (No. 2 overall) to the Minnesota Vikings in exchange for their 1985 first- and second-round selections (Nos. 3 and 30 overall).)
1985	11	Richard Johnson	DB	Wisconsin	Pick received from New Orleans Saints (Note: Tennessee traded running back Earl Campbell to the New Orleans Saints in exchange for their 1985 first-round selection (No. 11 overall).)
1986	3	Jim Everett	QB	Purdue	Did not play for the team (Note: Quarterback Jim Everett and the team could not reach an agreement on a contract. Everett was subsequently traded to the Los Angeles Rams. (Note: Tennessee traded the rights to quarterback Jim Everett to the Los Angeles Rams in exchange for their 1987 first- and fifth-round selections (Nos. 20 and 133 overall), 1988 first-round selection (No. 9 overall), guard Kent Hill, and defensive end William Fuller.))
1987	3	Alonzo Highsmith	RB	Miami (FL)	Moved up draft order in trade with Buffalo Bills (Note: Tennessee traded their 1987 first- and second-round selections (Nos. 8 and 36 overall) to the Buffalo Bills in exchange for their 1987 first-round selection (No. 3 overall).)
1987	20	Haywood Jeffires	WR	North Carolina State	Pick received from Los Angeles Rams
1988	22	Lorenzo White	RB	Michigan State	Additional pick received from Los Angeles Rams and subsequently traded to Los Angeles Raiders (Note: Tennessee traded a 1988 first-, received from the Los Angeles Rams, third-, and fourth-round selection (Nos. 9, 74, and 102 overall) to the Los Angeles Raiders in exchange for their 1988 second- and third-round selections (Nos. 48 and 60 overall) and defensive end Sean Jones.)
1989	23	David Williams	T	Florida	
1990	15	Lamar Lathon	LB	Houston	
1991	No pick				Moved down draft order in trade with New England Patriots (Note: Tennessee traded their 1991 first-round selection (No. 17 overall) to the New England Patriots in exchange for their 1991 second- and fourth-round selections (Nos. 28 and 101 overall).)
1992	No pick				Pick traded to San Diego Chargers (Note: Tennessee traded their 1992 first-round selection (No. 23 overall) and wide receiver Shawn Jefferson to the San Diego Chargers in exchange for defensive lineman Lee Williams.)
1993	13	Brad Hopkins	T	Illinois	Moved up draft order in trade with Philadelphia Eagles (Note: Tennessee traded their 1993 first- and third-round selections (Nos. 19 and 75 overall) to the Philadelphia Eagles in exchange for their 1993 first-round selection (No. 13 overall).)
1994	26	Henry Ford	DT	Arkansas	
1995	3	Steve McNair	QB	Alcorn State	
1996	14	Eddie George	RB	Ohio State	Moved down draft order in trade with Los Angeles Raiders (Note: Tennessee traded their 1996 first-round selection (No. 9 overall) to the Oakland Raiders in exchange for their 1996 first-, second-, and fourth-round selections (Nos. 17, 48, and 109 overall).) then up in trade with Seattle Seahawks (Note: Tennessee traded a 1996 first-round selection (No. 17 overall, received from the Los Angeles Raiders) and defensive tackle Glenn Montgomery to the Seattle Seahawks in exchange for their 1996 first-round selection (No. 14 overall).)
1997	18	Kenny Holmes	DE	Miami (FL)	Moved down draft order in trade with Kansas City Chiefs (Note: Tennessee traded their 1997 first- and fourth-round selections (Nos. 13 and 110 overall) to the Kansas City Chiefs in exchange for their 1997 first-, third-, fourth-, and sixth-round selections (Nos. 18, 81, 116, and 181 overall).)
1998	16	Kevin Dyson	WR	Utah	
1999	16	Jevon Kearse	DE	Florida	
2000	30	Keith Bulluck	LB	Syracuse	
2001	No pick				Pick traded to St. Louis Rams (Note: Tennessee traded their 2001 first-round selection (No. 29 overall) to the St. Louis Rams in exchange for defensive end Kevin Carter.)
2002	15	Albert Haynesworth	DT	Tennessee	Moved down draft order in trade with New York Giants (Note: Tennessee traded their 2002 first-round selection (No. 14 overall) to the New York Giants in exchange for their 2002 first- and fourth-round selections (Nos. 15 and 110 overall).)
2003	28	Andre Woolfolk	DB	Oklahoma	
2004	No pick				Moved down draft order in trade with Houston Texans (Note: Tennessee traded their 2004 first- and fifth-round selections (Nos. 27 and 159 overall) to the Houston Texans in exchange for their 2004 second-, third-, fourth-, and fifth-round selections (Nos. 40, 71, 103, and 138 overall).)
2005	6	Adam Jones	DB	West Virginia	
2006	3	Vince Young	QB	Texas	
2007	19	Michael Griffin	DB	Texas	
2008	24	Chris Johnson	RB	East Carolina	
2009	30	Kenny Britt	WR	Rutgers	
2010	16	Derrick Morgan	DE	Georgia Tech	
2011	8	Jake Locker	QB	Washington	
2012	20	Kendall Wright	WR	Baylor	
2013	10	Chance Warmack	G	Alabama	
2014	11	Taylor Lewan	T	Michigan	
2015	2	Marcus Mariota	QB	Oregon	
2016	8	Jack Conklin	T	Michigan State	Moved down draft order in trade with Los Angeles Rams (Note: Tennessee traded their 2016 first-, fourth-, and sixth-round selections (Nos. 1, 113, and 177 overall) to the Los Angeles Rams in exchange for their 2016 first-, third-, and two second-round selections (Nos. 15, 43, 45, and 76 overall) and 2017 first- and third-round selections (Nos. 5 and 100 overall).) then up in trade with Cleveland Browns (Note: Tennessee traded a 2016 first-, received from the Los Angeles Rams, and third-round selection (Nos. 15 and 76 overall) and 2017 second-round selection (No 52 overall) to the Cleveland Browns in exchange for their 2016 first- and sixth-round selections (Nos. 8 and 176 overall).)
2017	5	Corey Davis	WR	Western Michigan	Pick received from Los Angeles Rams
2017	18	Adoree' Jackson	DB	USC	
2018	22	Rashaan Evans	LB	Alabama	Moved up draft order in trade with Baltimore Ravens (Note: Tennessee traded their 2018 first- and fourth-round selections (Nos. 25 and 125 overall) to the Baltimore Ravens in exchange for their 2018 first- and sixth-round selections (Nos. 22 and 215 overall).)
2019	19	Jeffery Simmons	DT	Mississippi State	
2020	29	Isaiah Wilson	T	Georgia	
2021	22	Caleb Farley	CB	Virginia Tech	
2022	18	Treylon Burks	WR	Arkansas	Original pick traded to New York Jets. (Note: Tennessee traded their 2022 first- and third-round selections (Nos. 26 and 101 overall) to the New York Jets in exchange for their 2022 second-, third-, and fifth-round selections (Nos. 35, 69, and 163 overall).) Pick received from Philadelphia Eagles. (Note: Tennessee traded wide receiver A. J. Brown to the Philadelphia Eagles in exchange for their 2022 first- and third-round selections (Nos. 18 and 101 overall).)
2023	11	Peter Skoronski	G	Northwestern	
2024	7	JC Latham	T	Alabama	
2025	1	Cam Ward	QB	Miami	
2026	4	Carnell Tate	WR	Ohio State	
2026	31	Keldric Faulk	DE	Auburn	Pick received from Buffalo Bills. (Note: Buffalo traded first-, third- and fifth-round selections (31st, 69th and 165th overall) to Tennessee in exchange for second-, third- and fourth-round selections (35th, 66th and 101st overall).)

== See also ==
- History of the Tennessee Titans
- List of Tennessee Titans seasons
