= James Young (American football) =

American football player (born 1950)

Jim Young
No. 77
- Position: Defensive end

Personal information
- Born: July 8, 1950 (age 76); Houston, Texas, U.S.
- Listed height: 6 ft 2 in (1.88 m)
- Listed weight: 260 lb (118 kg)

Career information
- High school: Wheatley (Houston)
- College: Texas Southern
- NFL draft: 1976: undrafted

Career history
- Washington Redskins (1976)*; Houston Oilers (1977–1979)
- * Offseason or practice squad member only
- Stats at Pro Football Reference

James Alexander Young (born July 8, 1950) is an American former professional football player who was a defensive end for two seasons with the Houston Oilers of the National Football League (NFL). He played college football for the Texas Southern Tigers after attending Wheatley High School in Houston, Texas.
