= Ken Kennard =

American football player (born 1954)

No. 71
- Position: Defensive lineman

Personal information
- Born: October 4, 1954 (age 72); Fort Worth, Texas, U.S.
- Listed height: 6 ft 2 in (1.88 m)
- Listed weight: 248 lb (112 kg)

Career information
- High school: North Side (Fort Worth)
- College: Angelo State
- NFL draft: 1977: undrafted

Career history
- Houston Oilers (1977–1983)

Career NFL statistics
- Sacks: 16
- Fumble recoveries: 1
- Safeties: 1
- Stats at Pro Football Reference

Kenneth Jerome Kennard (born October 4, 1954) is an American former professional football player who was a defensive lineman for the Houston Oilers of the National Football League (NFL). He played college football for the Angelo State Rams. He was signed by the Oilers as an undrafted free agent in 1977 where he played until 1983.
