= Robert Woods (wide receiver, born 1955) =

American football player (born 1955)

No. 42, 47
- Position: Wide receiver

Personal information
- Born: July 3, 1955 (age 71); New Orleans, Louisiana, U.S.
- Listed height: 5 ft 7 in (1.70 m)
- Listed weight: 170 lb (77 kg)

Career information
- High school: George Washington Carver (New Orleans)
- College: Grambling State
- NFL draft: 1978: 5th round, 134th overall pick

Career history
- Houston Oilers (1978); Detroit Lions (1979)

Career NFL statistics
- Receptions: 6
- Receiving yards: 96
- Touchdowns: 2
- Stats at Pro Football Reference

Robert Christopher Woods (July 3, 1955) is an American former professional football player who was a wide receiver in the National Football League (NFL). He played for the Houston Oilers in 1978 and Detroit Lions in 1979. Woods played college football for the Grambling State Tigers and was selected 134th overall by the Kansas City Chiefs in the fifth round of the 1978 NFL draft. He is the father of former NFL wide receiver Robert Woods.
