= Tom Owen (American football) =

American football player (born 1952)

No. 14, 17
- Position: Quarterback

Personal information
- Born: September 1, 1952 (age 74); Shreveport, Louisiana, U.S.
- Listed height: 6 ft 1 in (1.85 m)
- Listed weight: 195 lb (88 kg)

Career information
- High school: Turner (Kansas City, Kansas)
- College: Wichita State
- NFL draft: 1974: 13th round, 322nd overall pick

Career history
- San Francisco 49ers (1974–1975); New England Patriots (1976–1981); Washington Redskins (1982); New York Giants (1983)

Awards and highlights
- Super Bowl champion (XVII); PFWA All-Rookie Team (1974)

Career NFL statistics
- Passing attempts: 349
- Passing completions: 170
- Completion percentage: 48.7%
- TD–INT: 14–26
- Passing yards: 2,300
- Passer rating: 52.5
- Stats at Pro Football Reference

Willis Thomas Owen (born September 1, 1952) is an American former professional football player who was a quarterback in ten National Football League (NFL) seasons from 1974 to 1983 for the San Francisco 49ers, New England Patriots, Washington Redskins, and New York Giants. He played college football at Wichita State University and was selected 332nd overall in the thirteenth round of the 1974 NFL draft.
