= Luv Ya Blue =

Houston Oilers fan movement

"Luv Ya Blue" was a movement by fans of the Houston Oilers of the National Football League (NFL) in the late 1970s that featured large flashcards, fight songs, pom-poms and other features more reminiscent of the college game than the NFL.

== Coining of the term ==
In the early 1970s, the Houston Oilers had fallen on hard times. In 1975, Bum Phillips was hired as the coach and ushered in a new era for the Oilers. With the help of stars such as Billy "White Shoes" Johnson and Elvin Bethea, the Oilers had their first winning season of the decade in 1975. Three years later, the Oilers drafted one of the most dominant running backs in college football, Heisman Trophy winner Earl Campbell of the University of Texas. Campbell went on to become the NFL Rookie of the Year, as well as the Most Valuable Player in 1979.

Led by the charismatic Phillips, the team quickly became a sensation in Houston. Many team members, including Campbell, began adopting Phillips' "good ole boy" attitude by wearing cowboy boots and "ten gallon" cowboy hats. As the 1978 season progressed, Campbell contributed such a large part of Houston's offense that many fans began referring to the team as the Houston "Earlers". However, this would soon change, as the marketing department of the Houston Oilers under the direction of PR Director Jack Cherry would give Oilers fans another catchphrase to use while cheering for their team.

On November 20, 1978, the Oilers took on the Miami Dolphins on Monday Night Football. In order to boost team spirit, the Oilers gave each fan a blue and white pompom before the game. The sight of over 50,000 fans waving the pompoms inspired the Oilers to a 35–30 victory behind Earl Campbell's 199 rushing yards and four touchdowns. After the game, Campbell stated, "The display of Blue was a chance for people of all races and backgrounds to come together as a city.” The Luv Ya Blue Era was born. Licensed products began appearing all over Houston. Joske's opened Luv Ya Blue retail shops inside their stores. Luv Ya Blue was a sports promotion that captured the connection of a city to its team.

== Spirit of Luv Ya Blue ==
After that night, blue-clad fans began to bring "Luv Ya Blue" signs to the Astrodome. Face painting also became popular, with many fans sporting the Oilers' logo painted on their cheek. Pep rallies were often organized and the Astrodome was regularly sold out as the entire city went wild for the Oilers. Houston's energy-based economy was also booming at the time due to rising fuel prices, and this gave a large sense of optimism that boosted Oilers fans. Additionally, many thousands of new Houstonians had recently moved in from other parts of the US due to the surging economy, and the Oilers became a common cause for new and established citizens to feel civic pride. Local singer/songwriter Mack Hayes wrote and recorded the song, We’re the Houston Oilers in 1978. Then after the ABC Monday Night Football game on December 10, 1979, where 50,000 "Luv Ya Blue" flashcards were distributed and the Houston Oilers defeated the Pittsburgh Steelers, Mack Hayes wrote, copyrighted and recorded his song, Luv ya Blue. The song became the Oilers' rallying song the following year and Hayes and the Love Ya Blue band played at the Astrodome for each of the 1980 home games. The song was played to the tune of the Beatle's song "Love Me Do", which resulted in a copyright lawsuit.

Another song, "Houston Oilers #1," written by Lee Ofman, was played until their departure from Houston in 1996. The song was originally written for the Miami Dolphins.

Look out, football, here we come.
Houston Oilers #1.

Houston has the Oilers, the greatest football team.
We take the ball from goal to goal like no one's ever seen.
We're in the air, we're on the ground ... always in control
And when you say the Oilers, you're talking Super Bowl.

'Cause we're the Houston Oilers, Houston Oilers, Houston Oilers, Number One.
Yes, we're the Houston Oilers, Houston Oilers, Houston Oilers, Number One.

We've got the offense.
We've got the defense.
We give the other team no hope.
'Cause we're the Houston Oilers, Houston Oilers,
You know we're gonna hold the rope.

Yes, we're the Houston Oilers, Houston Oilers, Houston Oilers, Number One.
Yes, we're the Houston Oilers, Houston Oilers, Houston Oilers, Number One.

'Cause we're the Houston Oilers, Houston Oilers, Houston Oilers, Number One.
Five - Seven - Eight, we're the best from the Lone Star State!
Houston Oilers, Houston Oilers, Houston Oilers, Number One.

'Cause we're the Houston Oilers, Houston Oilers, Houston Oilers, Number One.

Yes, we're the Houston Oilers, Houston Oilers… (fade out)

While the Oilers would never win an AFC Championship, they reached two AFC title games during the Luv Ya Blue era, which included losses to the Pittsburgh Steelers in 1978 and 1979. Despite the tough losses, they were still welcomed to thundering roars by crowds in Houston on both returns. During the latter rally, head coach Bum Phillips made a commitment to next year, famously stating that "One year ago, we knocked on the door. This year, we beat on the door. Next year, we're going to kick the son of a b---- in." The Oilers traded for Ken Stabler, but they would lose 27–7 in the Wild Card round on December 31, 1980. Shortly after the game ended, amidst disagreements with Adams over having three head coaches split offensive duties rather than one coordinator, Phillips was fired.
