= David Posey =

American football player (born 1956)

No. 9
- Position: Kicker

Personal information
- Born: April 1, 1956 (age 70); Painesville, Ohio, U.S.
- Listed height: 5 ft 11 in (1.80 m)
- Listed weight: 167 lb (76 kg)

Career information
- High school: St. Andrews (Boca Raton, Florida)
- College: Florida
- NFL draft: 1977: 9th round, 239th overall pick

Career history
- San Francisco 49ers (1977)*; Atlanta Falcons (1978)*; New England Patriots (1978)
- * Offseason or practice squad member only

Awards and highlights
- First-team All-SEC (1975)

Career NFL statistics
- Games played: 11
- Field goals made: 11
- Field goal attempts: 22
- Extra points made: 29
- Extra points attempted: 31
- Stats at Pro Football Reference

David Ellsworth Posey (born April 1, 1956) is an American former professional football player who was a kicker for the New England Patriots in the National Football League (NFL). He played college football for the Florida Gators.

== Early life and education ==
When Posey was in St. Andrews high school, the Miami Dolphins trained at his campus while he was there, making him friends with many Dolphins players. Also because of that, he was trained by All-Pro Miami Dolphins starting kicker Garo Yepremian and Miami Dolphins backup kicker Karl Kremser. He was both a kicker and punter in high school. He was The Herald's 'Offensive Player of The Week' in Palm Beach County twice.

Posey went to the University of Florida with no scholarship, being a walk-on. In a game against the Auburn Tigers on November 2, 1974, Posey made 2 field goals including a 47 yarder to take the lead at halftime in a 25–14 victory.

== Professional career ==
Posey was selected by the San Francisco 49ers in the ninth round of the 1977 NFL draft. He was cut by the 49ers before the season had begun, not playing at all in the 1977 season. In 1978, he was signed to the Atlanta Falcons during the preseason but was also cut by them.

However, during the 1978 NFL season, Posey got signed to the New England Patriots to replace the injured John Smith, whom got injured during week 3. In week 15 against the Buffalo Bills, Posey kicked a game-winning field goal to give the patriots their first ever division championship. Playing in eleven games, he made 11-of-22 field goals and 29-of-31 extra points. He played his first playoff game in the divisional round against the Houston Oilers. In that playoff loss, he made 2-of-2 extra points but missed his lone field goal.
