= Earl Campbell =

American football player (born 1955)

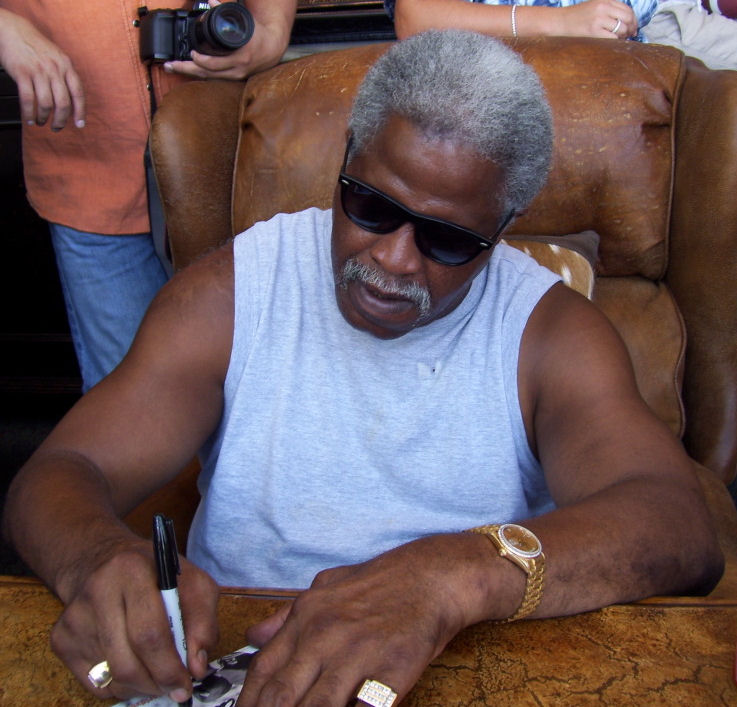
- Campbell signing autographs in 2009

No. 34, 35
- Position: Running back

Personal information
- Born: March 29, 1955 (age 71); Tyler, Texas, U.S.
- Listed height: 5 ft 11 in (1.80 m)
- Listed weight: 232 lb (105 kg)

Career information
- High school: John Tyler (Texas)
- College: Texas (1974–1977)
- NFL draft: 1978: 1st round, 1st overall pick

Career history
- Houston Oilers (1978–1984); New Orleans Saints (1984–1985)

Awards and highlights
- NFL Most Valuable Player (1979); 3× NFL Offensive Player of the Year (1978–1980); NFL Offensive Rookie of the Year (1978); 3× First-team All-Pro (1978–1980); 5× Pro Bowl (1978–1981, 1983); Joe F. Carr Trophy (1978); 3× NFL rushing yards leader (1978–1980); 2× NFL rushing touchdowns leader (1979, 1980); NFL 1970s All-Decade Team; NFL 100th Anniversary All-Time Team; Titans/Oilers Ring of Honor; Houston Oilers No. 34 retired; Heisman Trophy (1977); Unanimous All-American (1977); First-team All-American (1975); Texas Longhorns No. 20 retired

Career NFL statistics
- Rushing yards: 9,407
- Rushing average: 4.3
- Rushing touchdowns: 74
- Receptions: 121
- Receiving yards: 806
- Stats at Pro Football Reference
- Pro Football Hall of Fame
- College Football Hall of Fame

Earl Christian Campbell (born March 29, 1955), nicknamed "the Tyler Rose", is an American former professional football player who was a running back in the National Football League (NFL) for eight seasons, primarily with the Houston Oilers. Known for his aggressive, punishing running style, and ability to break tackles, Campbell gained recognition as one of the best power running backs in NFL history.

Campbell played college football for the Texas Longhorns, where he won the Heisman Trophy and earned unanimous All-American honors in his senior season, as well as numerous other accolades. Campbell was selected first overall by the Oilers in the 1978 NFL draft, and had an immediate impact in the league, earning NFL Rookie of the Year honors. Campbell was also named the NFL's Offensive Player of the Year in each of his first three seasons, during which he averaged nearly 1,700 rushing yards per season. Campbell won the AP NFL Most Valuable Player Award in 1979 after leading the league in rushing yards and touchdowns.

With head coach Bum Phillips, Campbell's emergence in Houston coincided with the Luv Ya Blue era, a period of sustained success in which the Oilers made three straight playoff appearances. Campbell became the centerpiece of Houston's offense during the late 1970s and early 1980s. He was traded to the New Orleans Saints six games into the 1984 season, where he spent his final season and a half before retiring. Campbell was inducted into both the College Football Hall of Fame (1990) and Pro Football Hall of Fame (1991). In 2019, he was named to the NFL 100th Anniversary All-Time Team. Campbell's jersey number is retired by the University of Texas and the Tennessee Titans. (Note: The Oilers franchise moved to Tennessee in 1998 and was renamed the "Titans" in 1999.)

== Early life ==
Earl Christian Campbell was born to Ann and Bert "B.C." Campbell, on March 29, 1955, in Tyler, Texas, leading to the nickname "the Tyler Rose" later in his career. He was the sixth of 11 siblings. B.C. died when Earl was 11 years old. Campbell began playing football in fifth grade as a kicker, but moved to linebacker in sixth grade after watching Dick Butkus, whom he modeled his playing style after. Ann Campbell attempted to persuade Earl not to play football in high school. "I dis-encouraged Earl," she said. "But he always loved football." In 1973, Campbell led the Corky Nelson–coached John Tyler High School to the Texas 4A State Championship (4A then was the largest classification in the state). That season, he was named Mr. Football USA as he was adjudged the national high school player of the year.

While heavily recruited, Campbell narrowed his choices to Houston, Oklahoma, Texas, Arkansas, and Baylor. After in-home visits from Barry Switzer from Oklahoma and Darrell Royal from Texas, Campbell ultimately chose Texas. Switzer, who unsuccessfully recruited Campbell, said in his 1989 book that Campbell was the only player he ever saw who could have gone straight from high school to the NFL and immediately become a star.

== College career ==
Campbell attended the University of Texas at Austin, where he played college football for the Texas Longhorns from 1974 to 1977.

As a freshman in 1974, Campbell played in all 11 games and had 162 carries for 928 yards and six touchdowns.

As a sophomore in 1975, Campbell was a first-team All-America selection at fullback by the American Football Coaches Association after leading the Southwest Conference with 1,118 rushing yards, 13 rushing touchdowns, and 78 points scored.

In 1976, leg injuries kept Campbell out of four games during his junior season, and he rushed for 653 yards and three touchdowns in seven games as Texas finished with a 5–5–1 record.

Campbell led the nation in rushing as a senior in 1977, with 1,744 yards and 19 touchdowns. In the third game of the season, against the Rice Owls, Campbell scored four touchdowns during a 72–15 blowout in which Texas kicker Russell Erxleben set an NCAA record with a 67-yard field goal. In his final regular-season game, Campbell rushed for a career-high 222 yards in a 57–28 victory over rival Texas A&M, and the Longhorns finished the regular season undefeated. After clinching the Southwest Conference championship, the top-ranked Longhorns then faced No. 5 Notre Dame, led by quarterback Joe Montana, in the Cotton Bowl Classic. Campbell carried 29 times for 116 yards in the game, but Notre Dame was victorious, 38–10, and claimed the national championship. Texas was ranked fourth in the final AP Poll.

Campbell was awarded the Heisman Memorial Trophy as the most outstanding college player after the season, becoming the University of Texas' first winner of the award. He also became the first recipient of the Davey O'Brien Memorial Trophy which was awarded to the outstanding player in the Southwest Conference. The Sporting News and United Press International each named Campbell the college football player of the year. He was a unanimous All-American, being named to the first team by every major selector.

Campbell finished his college career with 4,443 rushing yards and 40 rushing touchdowns in 40 games through four seasons.

== Professional career ==
=== Houston Oilers ===
Campbell was the first overall draft pick in the 1978 NFL draft, selected by the Houston Oilers, who signed him to a six-year, $1.4 million contract. The Oilers obtained the pick from the Tampa Bay Buccaneers by trading tight end Jimmie Giles, their first and second round picks in the 1978 Draft, and their third and fifth round picks in the 1979 Draft. "This is a commitment to excellence," said Oilers head coach Bum Phillips. "It takes a great running back to have a winning football team and this kid is a great running back." After rushing for a league-leading and rookie record 1,450 yards, Campbell was named the Offensive Rookie of the Year by the Sporting News and Associated Press (AP). He was also named the AFC Offensive Player of the Year by United Press International (UPI), NFL Offensive Player of the Year by the AP, and the NFL Most Valuable Player (MVP) by the Newspaper Enterprise Association (NEA) and Pro Football Writers of America (PFWA). Campbell's emergence contributed to the start of the Luv Ya Blue era in Houston.

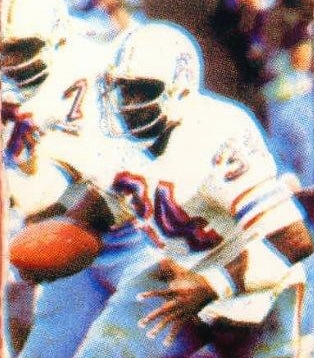
Campbell pictured rushing the ball early in his career with the Oilers

With quarterback Dan Pastorini nursing a mid-season shoulder injury, Campbell carried the Oilers to a five-game winning streak in 1979, which concluded with a 30–24 victory over the Dallas Cowboys on Thanksgiving Day, in which he rushed for 195 yards and two touchdowns. He finished the season with 1,697 rushing yards and 19 touchdowns, leading the league in both categories. Campbell also set NFL records with 11 100-yard rushing games, seven consecutive 100-yard games, and 368 carries. He was named NFL MVP by the AP, NEA, and PFWA. Campbell also repeated as the AP Offensive Player of the Year, and won the Bert Bell Award as the league's most outstanding player.

With his aggressive running style which favored running over players instead of around them, questions began to arise over how long Campbell could stay healthy. "He runs with a lot of reckless abandon," said Ron Johnson, a former running back whose own career was cut short. "You can run like that in college. But you can't do that for 10 years and hope to survive." Pittsburgh Steelers running back Franco Harris said, "Knocking over people can look very good but you can't do it forever. Sometimes it's going to be somebody else who knocks you over ... so the most important thing I think isn't to get a few extra yards every time but to make sure you're healthy enough to play." Bum Phillips, though, favored Campbell's running style. "I've been looking for a back like Earl," he said. "I'm not going to change his style. Why would I? You don't want a guy who gets hit and then flops on the ground. Earl does the same thing other backs do, only better."

After an 11–5 regular-season record in 1979, the Oilers defeated the Denver Broncos in the wild-card round for their first home playoff win since 1960. Houston then won the divisional round game against the San Diego Chargers despite both Pastorini and Campbell missing the game due to injuries. With both back in the lineup, however, the Oilers lost the conference championship game the following week against the Pittsburgh Steelers. Campbell was held to just 15 yards on 17 carries against Pittsburgh's "Steel Curtain" defense.

Campbell had his most productive rushing yardage season in 1980, with 1,934 yards in 15 games—an average of 128.9 yards per game. He finished 70 yards short of breaking O. J. Simpson's single-season rushing yards record set in 1973. Campbell again led the league in rushing yards and touchdowns, and broke his own record for carries, with 373. Over 60 percent of Campbell's yards came in the fourth quarter. "That's when the tough get going," said Campbell. He had four games of over 200 rushing yards, a single-season record that still stands as of the end of the 2016 season. Campbell also threw a 57-yard touchdown pass to receiver Billy "White Shoes" Johnson against the Steelers for his only career completion out of three attempts. The Oilers again finished with an 11–5 regular-season record, but lost in the Wild Card Round to the Oakland Raiders. For the third straight year, Campbell was awarded the Jim Thorpe Trophy by the Newspaper Enterprise Association as the league's MVP, and named the Offensive Player of the Year by the AP.

Bum Phillips was fired three days after Houston's loss in the wild-card game, and defensive coordinator Ed Biles was given the head coaching job. In 1981, the Oilers finished 7–9 and failed to make the playoffs for the first time with Campbell on the roster. Campbell also did not claim the rushing yards title for the first time in his career as he finished fifth in yards with 1,376 and seventh in touchdowns with 10. The highlight of the season was back-to-back rushing performances of over 180 yards, against the Cincinnati Bengals during week 5 and against the Seattle Seahawks in week 6. His 39 carries against the Seahawks set an Oilers single-game record. Campbell was invited to his fourth Pro Bowl, but failed to make an All-Pro roster.

A players' strike in 1982 shortened the season to nine games and the Oilers finished with a 1–8 record. Campbell had just two touchdowns and 538 rushing yards, an average of 59.8 yards per game—far below his average of 104.1 per game over the previous four seasons.

Campbell's production improved greatly in 1983 as he had 1,301 yards and 12 touchdowns, and was invited to his fifth Pro Bowl. However, the Oilers finished the season tied for the worst record in the league at 2–14. Unhappy after he was pulled in the second half against the Cincinnati Bengals in week 10, Campbell demanded to be traded. He completed the season with the team but remained adamant with his demand in the off-season. "I'm tired of hearing every week how I'm too dumb, washed up, too dumb to read holes, can't block, can't catch the football," said Campbell. The team's back-to-back dismal seasons also added to his frustration.

In 1984, under new head coach Hugh Campbell, Houston started the season with six straight losses. After rushing for 278 yards total in the first six games of 1984, Campbell was traded to the New Orleans Saints, reuniting him with Bum Phillips.

=== New Orleans Saints ===
The Saints received Campbell in exchange for their first-round draft pick in 1985, with which Houston selected cornerback Richard Johnson. The trade came as a surprise in New Orleans; the team already had the young George Rogers, the 1981 No. 1 overall draft pick and that year's Rookie of the Year and rushing champion. With Campbell and Rogers, the Saints now had two Heisman Trophy winners in the backfield. In his first game with New Orleans, Campbell carried five times for 19 yards, and continued to have a diminished role in the offense throughout the rest of the season. He rushed for a total of 468 yards and four touchdowns in 1984, and failed to record a 100-yard game during the season.

Campbell's final 100-yard game was his only one in 1985: a 160-yard outburst against the Minnesota Vikings in which he scored his only touchdown of the season. Campbell finished the year with 643 rushing yards on 158 carries.

=== Retirement ===
After considering a return for one more season to reach 10,000 career rushing yards, Campbell retired during the 1986 preseason, feeling that the beating he had taken during his career had taken too much of a toll. Campbell stated: "I'm a man; I'm not a little boy. I believe this is the best thing—not only for myself, but for the Saints." He finished his career with 2,187 carries for 9,407 yards and 74 touchdowns to go along with 121 receptions for 806 yards in the regular season.

== Career statistics ==
Legend
	AP NFL MVP & OPOTY
	NFL Offensive Player of the Year
	Led the league
**Bold**	Career high

=== NFL ===
==== Regular season ====
Year	Team	Games		Rushing					Receiving					Fum
Year	Team	GP	GS	Att	Yds	Avg	Lng	TD	Rec	Yds	Avg	Lng	TD	Fum
1978	HOU	15	14	302	1,450	4.8	**81T**	13	12	48	4.0	20	0	9
1979	HOU	16	16	368	1,697	4.6	61T	**19**	16	94	5.9	46	0	8
1980	HOU	15	15	**373**	**1,934**	**5.2**	55T	13	11	47	4.3	10	0	4
1981	HOU	16	16	361	1,376	3.8	43	10	**36**	156	4.3	17	0	**10**
1982	HOU	9	9	157	538	3.4	22	2	18	130	7.2	46	0	2
1983	HOU	14	14	322	1,301	4.0	42	12	19	**216**	11.4	**66**	0	4
1984	HOU	6	6	96	278	2.9	22	4	3	27	9.0	15	0	2
1984	NO	8	0	50	190	3.8	19	0	0	0	0.0	0	0	0
1985	NO	16	12	158	643	4.1	45	1	6	88	**14.7**	39	0	4
Career		115	102	2,187	9,407	4.3	81T	74	121	806	6.7	66	0	43

==== Postseason ====
Year	Team	Games		Rushing					Receiving					Fum
Year	Team	GP	GS	Att	Yds	Avg	Lng	TD	Rec	Yds	Avg	Lng	TD	Fum
1978	HOU	3	3	**75**	**264**	**3.5**	**35**	**2**	**3**	**27**	**9.0**	**13**	0	**4**
1979	HOU	2	2	33	65	2.0	9	1	2	18	9.0	11	0	1
1980	HOU	1	1	27	91	3.4	14	1	0	0	0.0	0	0	1
Career		6	6	135	420	3.1	35	4	5	45	9.0	13	0	6

=== College ===
Season	GP	Att	Yds	Avg	TD
1974	11	162	928	5.7	6
1975	11	198	1,118	5.6	13
1976	7	138	653	4.7	3
1977	11	**267**	**1,744**	**6.5**	**18**
Career	40	765	4,443	5.8	40

== Awards and honors ==
NFL

- NFL Most Valuable Player (1979)
- 3× NFL Offensive Player of the Year (1978–1980)
- NFL Offensive Rookie of the Year (1978)
- 3× First-team All-Pro (1978–1980)
- 5× Pro Bowl (1978–1981, 1983)
- Bert Bell Award (1979)
- Joe F. Carr Trophy (1978)
- 3× NFL rushing yards leader (1978–1980)
- 2× NFL rushing touchdowns leader (1979, 1980)
- NFL 1970s All-Decade Team
- NFL 100th Anniversary All-Time Team
- No. 55 on The Top 100: NFL's Greatest Players
- PFWA All-Rookie Team (1978)
- Titans/Oilers Ring of Honor
- Houston Oilers No. 34 retired

College

- Heisman Trophy (1977)
- Davey O'Brien Memorial Trophy (1977)
- SN Player of the Year (1977)
- Chic Harley Award (1977)
- Unanimous All-American (1977)
- First-team All-American (1975)
- NCAA rushing yards leader (1977)
- NCAA rushing touchdowns leader (1977)
- NCAA scoring leader (1977)
- 3× First-team All-SWC (1974, 1975, 1977)
- Texas Longhorns No. 20 retired

Hall of Fames

- Pro Football Hall of Fame
- College Football Hall of Fame
- Texas Sports Hall of Fame
- Houston Sports Hall of Fame
- National High School Hall of Fame
- National High School Football Hall of Fame

== Legacy ==
Campbell is widely acknowledged as one of the best power running backs in NFL history, and was highly regarded by his peers. "Every time you hit him you lower your own IQ," said Redskins linebacker Pete Wysocki. Cornerback Lester Hayes of the Raiders said, "Earl Campbell was put on this earth to play football." Cliff Harris, safety for the Cowboys, recalled Campbell as "the hardest-hitting running back I ever played against. He didn't have the elusiveness of an O. J. Simpson. But when you finished a game against Earl, you had to sit in a tub with Epsom salts." Bum Phillips, when asked if Campbell was in a class by himself, quipped, "I dunno. But if he ain't, it don't take long to call the roll."

Campbell is considered one of the greatest running backs in Texas Longhorns and college football history. He was inducted into the College Football Hall of Fame in 1990, along with fellow Heisman winner Jim Plunkett of Stanford. Campbell became the first Texas Longhorns football player to have his jersey retired by the university, his number 20 being retired in 1979. In 2000, an internet poll of Longhorns fans voted Campbell to Texas' All-Century team. He received the most votes, beating out recently graduated Ricky Williams.

On July 27, 1991, Campbell was inducted into the Pro Football Hall of Fame. Others inducted in the 1991 class were John Hannah, Stan Jones, Tex Schramm, and Jan Stenerud. He was introduced at the ceremony by Bum Phillips. Campbell's jersey number 34 was retired by the Oilers in 1987. He was inducted as one of six charter members into the Titans Hall of Fame in 1999, although Campbell declined an invitation to the induction ceremony, stating, "I was a Houston Oiler, not a Tennessee Titan."

In 1999, Campbell was ranked number 33 on The Sporting News' list of the 100 greatest football players, the highest-ranked player for the Houston Oilers franchise. In 2010, NFL Network ranked Campbell the 55th greatest player of all time in The Top 100: NFL's Greatest Players, and he was ranked by the sportswriter Max Bertellotti of the Turner Sports Network as the number 1 "power back" of all time.

Campbell was honored at halftime against Ohio State on September 9, 2006, including the unveiling of a 9-foot (2.7 m) bronze statue of Campbell in the southwest corner of Royal-Memorial Stadium. The same year, he was featured on the cover of Dave Campbell's Texas Football, an honor that eluded him during his playing days.

In 2019, Campbell was one of twelve running backs selected to the NFL 100th Anniversary All-Time Team.

On January 13, 2020, Campbell was honored during the College Football Playoff National Championship for the 150th anniversary of college football. ESPN named him the 7th best college football player of all time.

Campbell was declared an official State Hero in 1981 by the Texas legislature, an honor previously bestowed upon only Stephen F. Austin, Sam Houston and Davy Crockett.

A section of roadway in Tyler, Texas, extending from Loop 323 to SH155 was named the Earl Campbell Parkway at its opening in 2012. In 2013, the Earl Campbell Tyler Rose Award, an award given to the best offensive player in NCAA Division I with Texas ties, was named in Campbell's honor.

== Personal life ==
While at the University of Texas, Campbell was a member of the honorary men's service organization, the Texas Cowboys.

In 1980, Campbell married his high school sweetheart Reuna Smith, and they have two sons: Christian and Tyler. Christian played high school football with Drew Brees, the nephew of his father's former Longhorns teammate Marty Akins, at Westlake High and ran track for the University of Houston. Tyler was a running back for Pasadena City College and San Diego State but was forced to give up the sport due to multiple sclerosis (MS). He returned to Texas after graduation and divides his time between the family business and raising awareness of MS with his father.

In 1990, Campbell founded Earl Campbell Meat Products, Inc. which manufactures and sells Earl Campbell's Smoked Sausage and other food products and barbecue sauce. Campbell and his associates also opened a restaurant in 1999 on Sixth Street in Austin called Earl Campbell's Lone Star BBQ, which closed in 2001.

As of 2016, he still actively participated in University of Texas athletics, serving as special assistant to the football team.

=== Health ===
Campbell has experienced various physical ailments in his later life. By 2001, at age 46, Campbell could barely close his fist due to arthritis in his hands. He developed foot drop due to nerve damage in his legs, and has difficulty bending his back and knees. Campbell was diagnosed with spinal stenosis in 2009. Because of his difficulty walking, Campbell uses a cane or a walker, and a wheelchair for longer distances. At first, he maintained the ailments were genetic, but said in 2012, "I think some of it came from playing football, playing the way I did."

In 2009, Campbell became addicted to painkillers prescribed for his spinal stenosis, taking as many as ten OxyContin pills a day with Budweiser. He went through rehabilitation and broke his addiction the same year. Since publicizing the incident in 2013, he has spoken out about the dangers of substance abuse.

== See also ==
- List of Texas Longhorns football All-Americans
- List of NCAA major college football yearly rushing leaders
- List of NCAA major college football yearly scoring leaders
- List of first overall National Football League draft picks
- List of Tennessee Titans first-round draft picks
