= Houston Oilers =

Former American football franchise in Houston, Texas (1960–1996)

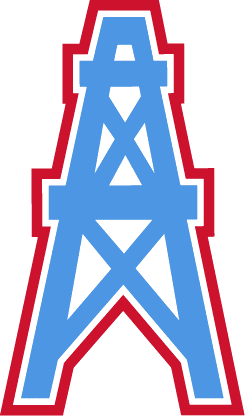
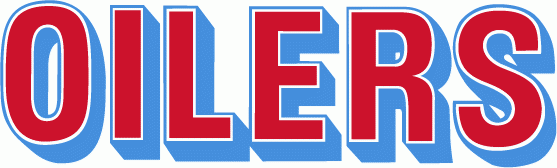
Logo	Wordmark
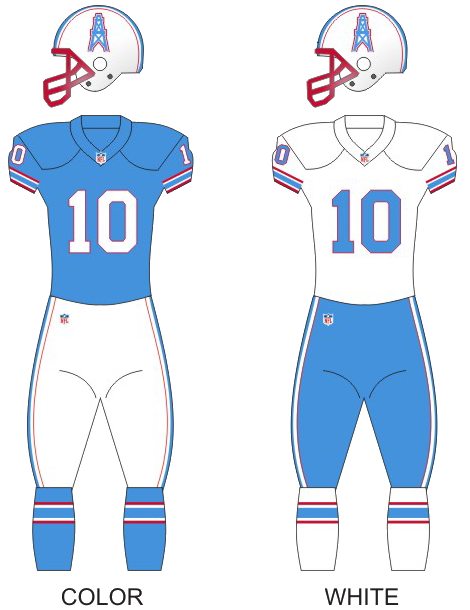
- Uniforms

General information
- Founded: 1960
- Folded: 1996
- Headquartered: Houston, Texas
- Colors: Columbia blue, white, red
- Fight song: Luv Ya Blue/Houston Oilers #1
- Mascot: The Roughneck

Personnel
- Owner: Bud Adams
- General manager: Don Suman (1960–1961); Pop Ivy (1962–1963); Carroll Martin (1964–1965); Don Klosterman (1966–1969); Bob Brodhead (1970); John W. Breen (1971–1972); Sid Gillman (1973–1974); Bum Phillips (1975–1980); Ladd Herzeg (1981–1989); Mike Holovak (1990–1993); Floyd Reese (1994–1996)
- Head coach: Lou Rymkus (1960–1961); Wally Lemm (1961); Pop Ivy (1962–1963); Sammy Baugh (1964); Hugh Taylor (1965); Wally Lemm (1966–1970); Ed Hughes (1971); Bill Peterson (1972–1973); Sid Gillman (1973–1974); Bum Phillips (1975–1980); Ed Biles (1981–1983); Chuck Studley (1983); Hugh Campbell (1984–1985); Jerry Glanville (1985–1989); Jack Pardee (1990–1994); Jeff Fisher (1994–1996)

Team history
- Houston Oilers (1960–1996); Tennessee Oilers (1997–1998); Tennessee Titans (1999–present)

Home fields
- Jeppesen Stadium (1960–1964); Rice Stadium (1965–1967); Houston Astrodome (1968–1996)

League / conference affiliations
- American Football League (AFL) (1960–1969): Eastern Division (1960–1969); National Football League (1970–1996): American Football Conference (1970–1996); AFC Central (1970–1996)

Championships
- League championships: 2: AFL championships (pre-1970 AFL–NFL merger) (2) 1960, 1961
- Division championships: 6: AFL East: 1960, 1961, 1962, 1967; AFC Central 1991, 1993

Playoff appearances (15)
- AFL: 1960, 1961, 1962, 1967, 1969; NFL: 1978, 1979, 1980, 1987, 1988, 1989, 1990, 1991, 1992, 1993

The Houston Oilers were a professional American football team that played in Houston from their founding in 1960 to 1996. They began play as a charter member of the American Football League (AFL) and won two AFL championships before joining the NFL in the AFL–NFL merger of the late 1960s.

The Oilers competed in the AFL's East division—along with the Buffalo Bills, New York Jets, and Boston Patriots—until the merger, when they joined the newly formed AFC Central. The team played home games at Jeppesen Stadium and Rice Stadium during its first eight seasons, and thereafter at the Astrodome.

The Oilers were the first champions of the AFL, winning the 1960 and 1961 championships, but never won another. They appeared in the 1962 AFL Championship, losing in double overtime to their in-state rivals, the Dallas Texans (now the Kansas City Chiefs); the Oilers also won the AFL East division title in 1967 and qualified for the 1969 AFL playoffs, both times losing to the Oakland Raiders (which are now the Las Vegas Raiders). From 1978 to 1980, the Oilers, led by Bum Phillips and in the midst of the Luv Ya Blue campaign, appeared in and lost the 1978 and 1979 AFC Championship Games. They were a consistent playoff team from 1987 to 1993, an era that included both of the team's only division titles (1991 and 1993), as well as the dubious distinction of being on the losing end of the second largest comeback in NFL history. For the rest of the Oilers' time in Houston, they compiled losing seasons in almost every other year.

The Oilers' main colors were Columbia blue and white, with scarlet trim, while their logo was a simple derrick. Oilers' jerseys were always Columbia blue for home and white for away. The helmet color was Columbia blue with a white derrick from 1960 through 1965, silver with a Columbia blue derrick from 1966 through 1971, and Columbia blue with a white-and-scarlet derrick from 1972 through 1974, before changing to a white helmet with a Columbia blue derrick beginning in 1975 and lasting the remainder of the team's time in Houston.

The Oilers were owned by Bud Adams, who began threatening to move the team in the late 1980s, and finally did so after the 1996 season. He moved the team to Tennessee, where they played as the Tennessee Oilers in Memphis for the 1997 season, then in Nashville for the 1998 season. In 1999, to coincide with the opening of their new stadium, Adams changed the team's name to the Tennessee Titans and the color scheme from Columbia blue, scarlet, and white to Titans blue, navy, white, and silver with scarlet accents. The franchise retained the Houston Oilers' team history and records, while the team's name was retired by then-NFL Commissioner Paul Tagliabue, thus preventing a future Houston National Football League (NFL) team from using the Oilers' name.

Later Houston-based football teams have paid homage to the Oilers. The Houston Roughnecks, an XFL team founded in 2020, shares their name with the Oilers' old mascot and used a logo that resembled the Oilers' until they changed it under pressure from the NFL. The University of Houston football team wore Oilers-style throwback uniforms during the Cougars' 2023 season opener against UTSA.

== 1960s ==
The Houston Oilers began in 1960 as a charter member of the American Football League. They were owned by Bud Adams, a Houston oilman who had made several previous unsuccessful bids for an NFL expansion team in Houston. Adams was an influential member of the eight original AFL owners, since he, Dallas Texans/Kansas City Chiefs founder Lamar Hunt and Buffalo Bills founder Ralph Wilson were more financially stable than the other five. (All three would go on to own their franchises for over forty years, whereas the others pulled out by the 1980s.)

The Oilers appeared in the first three AFL championships. They scored an important victory over the NFL when they signed LSU's Heisman Trophy winner, All-America running back Billy Cannon. Cannon joined other Oiler offensive stars such as quarterback George Blanda, flanker Charlie Hennigan, running back Charlie Tolar, and guard Bob Talamini. After winning the first-ever AFL championship over the Los Angeles Chargers in 1960, they repeated over the same team (then in San Diego) in 1961. (In 2012, the retail outlet Old Navy earned infamy for selling a shirt that misidentified the 1961 AFL champions as the Houston Texans, which did not exist until 2002.) The Oilers lost to the Dallas Texans in the classic 1962 double-overtime AFL championship game, at the time the longest professional football championship game ever played. In 1962, the Oilers were the first AFL team to sign an active NFL player away from the other league, when wide receiver Willard Dewveall left the Bears to join the champion Oilers. Dewveall that year caught the longest pass reception for a touchdown in professional American football history, 99 yards, from Jacky Lee, against the San Diego Chargers.

The Oilers won the AFL Eastern Division title again in 1967, then became the first professional football team to play in a domed stadium, when they moved into Houston's Astrodome, then home of MLB's Houston Astros for the 1968 season. Previously, the Oilers had played at Jeppesen Stadium at the University of Houston (later called Robertson Stadium) from 1960 to 1964, and Rice University's stadium from 1965 to 1967. Adams had intended the team play at Rice from the first, but Rice's board of regents initially rejected the move. After the Astrodome opened for business, Adams attempted to move there, but could not negotiate an acceptable lease with the Houston Sports Association (owners of the Houston Astros) from whom he would sublease the Dome. The 1969 season, the last as an AFL team, saw Houston begin 3–1, but tumble afterwards. They qualified for the playoffs, but were defeated by the Raiders 56–7, to finish the year with a record of 6–7–2.

== 1970s ==
The years immediately after the AFL-NFL Merger were not as kind to the Oilers, who sank to the bottom of the AFC Central division. After going 3–10–1 in 1970, they went 4–9–1 in 1971, and then suffered back-to-back 1–13 seasons in 1972–73. But by 1974, the Oilers led by Hall of Fame coach Sid Gillman brought the team back to respectability by reaching .500 at season's end.

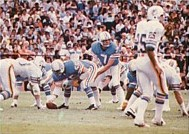
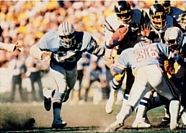
The Oilers made consecutive playoff runs in 1978 (left), 1979 (right) and 1980, led by Dan Pastorini (left), Elvin Bethea (right) and Earl Campbell.

The next year, Bum Phillips arrived and with talented stars like Elvin Bethea and Billy "White Shoes" Johnson, the Oilers had their first winning season of the decade going 10–4 but did not make the playoffs. Injuries and inadequate offense doomed them to a 5–9 season in 1976, but the team improved to 8–6 the following year, and in 1978, the Oilers' fortunes improved when they drafted University of Texas football star Earl Campbell, known as the "Tyler Rose", who was Rookie of the Year that year and led the Oilers to their first playoff appearance since the merger.

Defeating Miami in the wild-card round, they then trumped New England, leading to immediately rebuilding of the Patriots. But in the AFC Championship, the Steelers routed them 34–5. In spite of the lopsided defeat, the Oilers returned home to a packed Astrodome for a pep-rally uncommon in professional sports.

The 1979 season was a near rerun of 1978 as the Oilers finished 11–5 with Campbell gaining 1,600 yards in the regular season, and again earned a wild card spot. Beating the Broncos in the first home playoff game in Houston in over a decade, the Oilers' performance suffered with injuries to Campbell, quarterback Dan Pastorini and top receiver Ken Burrough. They did manage to edge past the high-flying San Diego of Dan Fouts in the divisional round, partly thanks to the play of Vernon Perry (4 INTs and a blocked FG) as well as the outstanding line coached by Joe Bugel. The Oilers returned to the AFC Championship game for the second year in a row, only to get knocked down by the Pittsburgh Steelers again, in spite of a terrific effort by Dan Pastorini—the Steelers had shut the ailing Campbell down, yet Pastorini nearly succeeded with the modest receiving corps of Mike Renfro, Rich Caster, and Ronnie Coleman venturing into the Steelers excellent defense. A controversial out-of-bounds call nullified a touchdown by wide receiver Mike Renfro resulting in a 27–13 victory for Pittsburgh. Once again, after a tough loss, the Oilers returned to their then-adoring fans who packed the Astrodome for an impromptu pep-rally for the second year in a row.

== 1980s ==
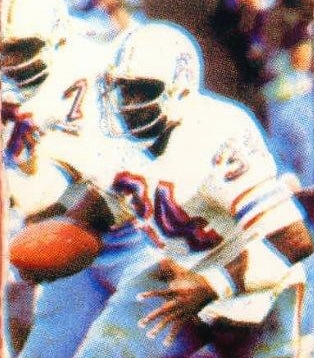
Pro Football Hall of Famer running back Earl Campbell was the centerpiece of the Oilers' offense in the late 1970s and early 1980s, earning several NFL awards, AFC rushing titles and five Pro Bowls.

Before the 1980 season, Pastorini was traded to the Oakland Raiders in exchange for Hall of Fame quarterback Ken Stabler. The Oilers went 11–5 in the 1980 season and achieved a wild card spot for the third year in a row, but they were quickly vanquished by Oakland, 27–7. Bud Adams fired Bum Phillips, who was succeeded by Ed Biles. Afterwards began a long playoff drought as the Oilers fell to 7–9 in 1981, and 1–8 in the strike-shortened 1982 season. In 1983, Houston went 2–14. Biles resigned in Week 6 and was succeeded by Chuck Studley, who served merely as an interim coach until Hugh Campbell was hired in the off-season. In 1984, the Oilers won a bidding war for free-agent former CFL quarterback Warren Moon (who played for Campbell with the Edmonton Eskimos), but didn't return to the playoffs that year either, with two wins and fourteen losses. The aging Earl Campbell was traded to New Orleans during the off-season and was replaced by Mike Rozier, a refugee from the USFL. In week 14 of the 1985 season, Campbell was replaced by Jerry Glanville, who saw the team through the last two games to finish 5–11. A 31–3 rout of Green Bay in the 1986 season opener looked promising, but in the end Houston only managed another 5–11 record. Another strike in 1987 reduced the season to 15 games, three by substitute players. After ending 9–6, the team achieved its first winning record and playoff berth in seven years. After beating the Seahawks in overtime, they fell to Denver in the divisional round. Going 10–6 in 1988, the Oilers again got into the playoffs as a wild card, beat Cleveland in a snowy 24–23 match, and then lost to Buffalo a week later. 1989 saw a 9–7 regular season, but the team gained a wild card berth. In a messy, penalty-ridden game, they were beaten by Pittsburgh.

=== Renovation to the Astrodome ===
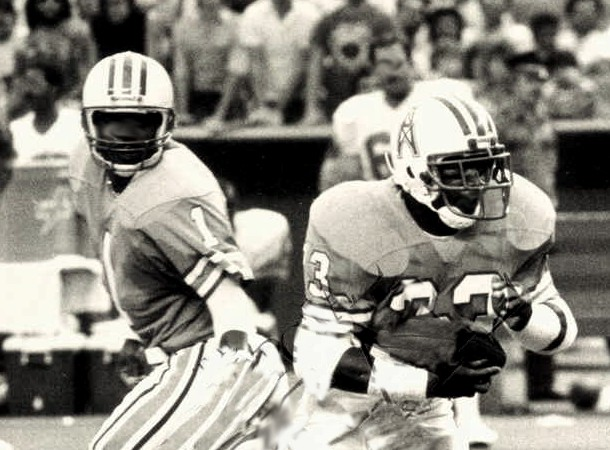
AFC Pro Bowlers Warren Moon (left) and Mike Rozier (right) made major contributions to the Oilers' offense in the late 1980s while leading the team to several playoff appearances.

The Oilers' resurgence came in the midst of a battle for the franchise's survival. In 1987, Adams threatened to move the team to Jacksonville, Florida (later the home of Jacksonville Jaguars), unless the Astrodome was "brought up to date". At the time the Astrodome seated about 50,000 fans, the smallest capacity in the NFL. Not willing to lose the Oilers, Harris County responded with $67 million in improvements to the Astrodome that included new AstroTurf, 10,000 additional seats and 65 luxury boxes. These improvements were funded by increases in property taxes and the doubling of the hotel tax, as well as bonds to be paid over 30 years. However, Adams' increasing demands for greater and more expensive accommodations to be funded at taxpayer expense eventually led to the team's departure from Houston.

== 1990s ==
The Oilers briefly rose to become a league power once again in the first half of the 1990s. In 1991, the Oilers won their first division title in 25 years, and their first as an NFL team. However, only two minutes away from their first conference title game in 13 years, they were the victims of an 80-yard march by John Elway and the Denver Broncos before David Treadwell kicked a 28-yard field goal to win the game 26–24. In 1992, the Oilers compiled a 10–6 regular season record, but made history against the Buffalo Bills in the AFC Wild Card playoffs by blowing an NFL record 35–3 lead and eventually losing 41–38 in overtime, a game now known simply as "The Comeback". Bud Adams made it clear he was not happy about the consistent playoff failure, and all but threatened that this would the team's final chance under their current core, and were they to fail he would begin to rebuild, no player safe.

In the 1993 season, the Oilers finished with a 12–4 record, their best record ever in Texas, and another AFC Central title. However, the 1993 season is best remembered for its internal conflict; "Team Turmoil" began 1–4 start but then won their final 11 games. Offensive coordinator Kevin Gilbride and defensive coordinator Buddy Ryan brawled during the final game of the regular season (nationally broadcast on ESPN) against the New York Jets. They lost against the Chiefs in the Divisional round 28–20 in what would prove to be the final playoff game for the Houston Oilers. After the season, Adams began to rebuild the team by releasing or trading most of their stars and free agents, notably Moon to the Minnesota Vikings. This gutting would have likely have happened anyway, as the team was projected to be over the salary cap for 1994 in the first year the cap would be in effect.

The Oilers finished the next season 2–14, the third-worst record for a full season in franchise history and the steepest season-to-season decline in NFL history (a record later tied by the 2013 Houston Texans). The Oilers would never make the playoffs again in Texas. However, they did draft Steve McNair in 1995.

=== Final years in Houston ===
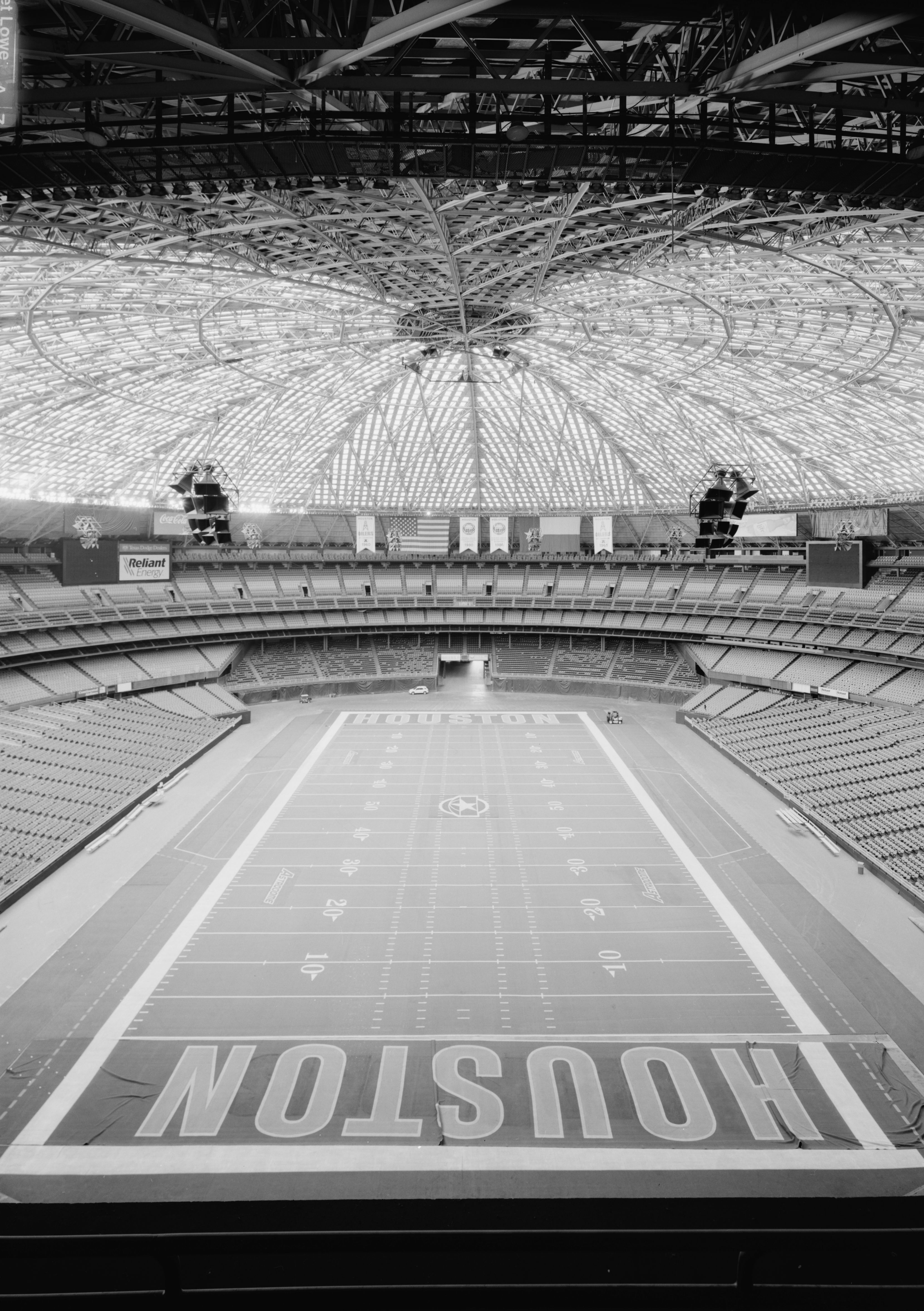
The now-abandoned Astrodome, which was the home of the Houston Astros, had football turf still intact after the Oilers' departure.

At the same time, Adams again lobbied the city for a new stadium, one with club seating and other revenue generators present in recently built NFL stadiums, and he committed to pay for 25% of the cost of a new stadium. His idea called for a downtown domed stadium that could also be reconfigured to accommodate the NBA's Houston Rockets–similar to San Antonio's Alamodome. Mayor Bob Lanier initially supported Adams' bid for a new stadium privately, but refused to publicly support the project. Although Houstonians wanted to keep the Oilers, they were wary of investing more money on a stadium so soon after the Astrodome improvements. The city was also still struggling to recover from the oil collapse of the 1980s. Adams, sensing that he was not going to get the stadium he wanted, began shopping the Oilers to other cities. He was particularly intrigued by Nashville, and opened secret talks with mayor Phil Bredesen. On November 16, 1995, Adams announced that the Oilers would be moving to Nashville for the 1998 season. City officials there promised to contribute $144 million toward a new stadium, as well as $70 million in ticket sales.

After the move was announced, support for the Oilers in the Houston area dried up almost overnight. As a result, the 1996 season was an unmitigated disaster. Only three games attracted crowds of more than 30,000 people. Games were so quiet that it was possible to hear conversations on the field from the grandstand. Meanwhile, the team's radio network, which once stretched across the state of Texas, was reduced to flagship KTRH in Houston and a few affiliates in Tennessee. By October 1996, KTRH was cutting from ongoing games to broadcast Houston Rockets preseason games. The Oilers got off to a 5–2 start, but a stretch of four losses in five games took them out of playoff contention. The team went 8–8, finishing 6–2 in road games and only 2–6 in home games. The team's final game in Houston, against the Bengals on December 15, attracted just over 15,000 people—by at least one estimate, the smallest crowd in franchise history. Adams, the city and the league were unwilling to see this continue for another season, so a deal was reached on May 8, 1997 to let the Oilers out of their lease a year early and move to Tennessee. The Oilers lost their final game in Houston 21–13.

In 1999, Robert McNair was awarded, at a cost of $1 billion, an expansion team to replace the Oilers in Houston. The franchise became the Houston Texans, which adopted a similar red-white-and-blue scheme, albeit in darker shades, and inherited the sports complex the Oilers had played in, but not the Oilers' former home; what is now called Reliant Stadium (formerly NRG Stadium) would be built next door to the Astrodome in 2002. Gary Walker, who played with the Houston Oilers in the 1995 and 1996 seasons, would sign with the Houston Texans for their inaugural 2002 season, and finished his professional football career with the team, retiring in 2005. Walker was the only NFL player to have played for both the Houston Oilers and Houston Texans. Brad Hopkins was the last player on the Titans who played for the Oilers when he retired in 2005. Jon Runyan was the last active NFL player to have played for the Oilers when he retired in 2009.

== Notable players ==
=== Retired numbers ===
Houston Oilers retired numbers
No.	Player	Position	Years played	Retired
1	Warren Moon	QB	1984–1993	October 1, 2006
9	Steve McNair	QB	1995–1996	September 15, 2019
27	Eddie George	RB	1996	September 15, 2019
34	Earl Campbell	RB	1978–1984	August 13, 1987
43	Jim Norton	S/P	1960–1968	
63	Mike Munchak	OG	1982–1993	November 6, 1994
65	Elvin Bethea	DE	1968–1983	August 4, 1983
74	Bruce Matthews	OT	1983–1996	December 8, 2002

=== Pro Football Hall of Fame members ===
Houston Oilers Hall of Famers
Players
No.	Inductee	Class	Position	Seasons
65	Elvin Bethea	2003	DE	1968–1983
16	George Blanda	1981	QB/K	1960–1966
52	Robert Brazile	2018	LB	1975–1984
34	Earl Campbell	1991	RB	1978–1984
87	Dave Casper	2002	TE	1980–1983
78	Curley Culp	2013	DT	1974–1980
29	Ken Houston	1986	S	1967–1972
35	John Henry Johnson	1987	FB	1966
18/40	Charlie Joiner	1996	WR	1969–1972
74	Bruce Matthews	2007	OT	1983–1996
1	Warren Moon	2006	QB	1984–1993
63	Mike Munchak	2001	OG	1982–1993
12	Ken Stabler	2016	QB	1980–1981
Coaches and Executives
Inductee		Class	Position	Seasons
Sammy Baugh		1963	Coach	1964
Sid Gillman		1983	Coach	1973–1974

=== Houston Oilers Hall of Fame ===
Bud Adams established the Titans/Oilers Hall of Fame after the 40th season of the franchise to honor past players and management.

Elected to the Pro Football Hall of Fame

Houston Oilers Hall of Fame
No.	Name	Position	Years	Inducted
65	Elvin Bethea	DE	1968–1983	December 9, 1999
16	George Blanda	QB/K	1960–1966	December 9, 1999
34	Earl Campbell	RB	1978–1984	December 9, 1999
—	Mike Holovak	GM	1989–1993	December 9, 1999
29	Ken Houston	S	1967–1972	December 9, 1999
63	Mike Munchak	G	1982–1993	December 9, 1999
43	Jim Norton	P	1960–1968	December 9, 1999
74	Bruce Matthews	OL	1983–1996	December 8, 2002
1	Warren Moon	QB	1984–1993	October 1, 2007
—	Bud Adams	Owner/founder	1959–1996	September 7, 2008
27	Eddie George	RB	1996	October 27, 2008
9	Steve McNair	QB	1995–1996	October 27, 2008
41/89	Frank Wycheck	TE	1995–1996	October 27, 2008
52	Robert Brazile	LB	1975–1984	October 14, 2018
—	Bum Phillips	Coach	1975–1980	September 26, 2021
—	Jeff Fisher	Coach	1994–1996	November 21, 2021
—	Floyd Reese	Coach/GM	1986–1996	November 21, 2021
84	Billy "White Shoes" Johnson	WR	1974–1980	December 17, 2023

== See also ==
- List of Houston Oilers and Tennessee Titans seasons
- History of the Tennessee Titans
- History of the Houston Texans
- Texans–Titans rivalry
