= 1979 Houston Oilers season =

NFL team season

- Owner: Bud Adams
- General manager: Bum Phillips
- Head coach: Bum Phillips
- Home stadium: Astrodome

Results
- Record: 11–5
- Division place: 2nd AFC Central
- Playoffs: Won Wild Card Playoffs (vs. Broncos) 13–7; Won Divisional Playoffs (at Chargers) 17–14; Lost AFC Championship (at Steelers) 13–27
- Pro Bowlers: DE Elvin Bethea; LB Robert Brazile; RB Earl Campbell; K Toni Fritsch; LT Leon Gray; FS Mike Reinfeldt

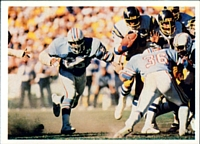
Houston's defensive line blocking a San Diego rushing attempt during the 1979 AFC Divisional Playoff Game.

The 1979 Houston Oilers season was the franchise's 20th overall and the tenth in the National Football League. The franchise scored 362 points while the defense gave up 331 points. Their record of 11 wins and 5 losses resulted in a second-place finish in the AFC Central Division. The Oilers appeared once on Monday Night Football on December 10, 1979 where the sports promotion Luv ya Blue was launched and returned to the AFC Championship Game for the second consecutive year. Earl Campbell would lead the NFL in rushing for the second consecutive year and set a franchise record for most touchdowns in a season with 19. The Oilers would make the playoffs again as a wild card. In the wild card game, they beat the Denver Broncos 13–7, and then defeated the San Diego Chargers 17–14 in San Diego to reach their second straight AFC Championship game. The Oilers then played the Pittsburgh Steelers, who a year earlier had eliminated them 34–5 in the previous AFC Championship game. The Oilers lost the game 27–13. The game included a controversial moment in which wide receiver Mike Renfro had a touchdown called back after the referees of the game took a long time to decide the ruling on the field. The call went down as one of the most controversial calls in NFL history.

As of 2026, this is the most recent season a Houston-based team has reached the AFC Championship Game. The Oilers franchise would not do so again for twenty seasons, by which time they had re-located and become the Tennessee Titans, while Houston's current NFL team has yet to advance past the divisional round.

NFL Films produced a documentary about the team's season entitled Luv Ya Blue, Bum Builds a Winner; it was narrated by John Facenda.

== Offseason ==
=== NFL draft ===
1979 Houston Oilers draft
Round	Pick	Player	Position	College	Notes
2	31	Mike Stensrud	Defensive tackle	Iowa State	
2	50	Jesse Baker	Defensive end	Jacksonville State	
3	72	Kenny King *	Running back	Oklahoma	
6	143	Daryl Hunt	Linebacker	Oklahoma	
6	159	Mike Murphy	Linebacker	Missouri State	
7	171	Tim Ries	Defensive back	Missouri State	
8	214	Carter Hartwig	Defensive back	USC	
9	243	Richard Ellender	Wide receiver	McNeese State	
11	298	Mike Taylor	Offensive tackle	Georgia Tech	
12	324	Wayne Wilson	Running back	Shephard College	
Made roster * Made at least one Pro Bowl during career

== Personnel ==
=== Staff ===
1979 Houston Oilers staff
Front office: President – Bud Adams; General Manager – Bum Phillips; Senior Vice President/Chief Administrative Officer – Ladd Herzeg; Assistant General Manager – Pat Peppler; Director of College Scouting – Joe Woolley; Head coaches: Head Coach – Bum Phillips; Offensive coaches: Offensive Backs – Andy Bourgeois; Receivers – King Hill; Offensive Line – Joe Bugel	Defensive coaches: Defensive Coordinator/Linebackers – Ed Biles; Defensive Line – Wade Phillips; Defensive Secondary – Bob Gambold; Special teams coaches: Special Teams – John Paul Young

=== Roster ===
1979 Houston Oilers roster
Quarterbacks (QB): 14 Gifford Nielsen; 7 Dan Pastorini; Running backs (RB): 34 Earl Campbell; 26 Rob Carpenter; 42 Boobie Clark; 47 Ronnie Coleman; 45 Tim Wilson; Wide receivers (WR): 00 Ken Burrough; 88 Rich Caster; 85 Rich Ellender; 81 Jeff Groth; 12 Guido Merkens; 82 Mike Renfro; Tight ends (TE): 86 Mike Barber; 87 Conrad Rucker	Offensive linemen (OL): 58 David Carter C/G; 60 Ed Fisher G; 74 Leon Gray T; 70 Conway Hayman G; 55 Carl Mauck C; 68 Tom Randall G; 76 Morris Towns T; Defensive linemen (DL): 75 Jesse Baker DE; 65 Elvin Bethea DE; 78 Curley Culp NT; 69 Andy Dorris DE; 71 Ken Kennard NT; 67 Mike Stensrud DE	Linebackers (LB): 63 Steve Baumgartner OLB; 54 Gregg Bingham ILB; 52 Robert Brazile OLB; 50 Daryl Hunt ILB; 53 Art Stringer ILB; 51 Ted Thompson OLB; 59 Ted Washington OLB; Defensive backs (DB): 19 Willie Alexander CB; 20 Bill Currier SS; 36 Carter Hartwig CB/FS; 21 Charles Jefferson CB; 32 Vernon Perry SS; 37 Mike Reinfeldt FS; 27 Greg Stemrick CB; 33 J. C. Wilson CB; Special teams (ST): 16 Toni Fritsch K; 18 Cliff Parsley P	Reserve: 84 Billy Johnson WR (IR); 30 Kenny King RB (IR); 56 Mike Murphy LB (IR); 64 George Reihner G (IR); 73 Greg Sampson T (NF-Ill.); 62 John Schuhmacher G (IR); 41 Tony Towns LB (IR); 38 C. L. Whittington S (IR); 79 Randy Young G (IR); -- Steve Young TE (IR); Rookies in italics

== Preseason ==
=== Schedule ===
Week	Date	Opponent	Result	Record	Venue	Attendance	Recap
1	August 2	St. Louis Cardinals	W 9–7	1–0	Astrodome	46,252	
2	August 12	New York Jets	L 14–26	1–1	Astrodome	43,350	
3	August 18	at Dallas Cowboys	L 13–16	1–2	Texas Stadium	62,803	
4	August 24	at New Orleans Saints	L 7–10	1–3	Louisiana Superdome	54,469	

=== Week P3 (Saturday, August 18, 1979): at Dallas Cowboys ===
Week P3: Houston Oilers 13 at Dallas Cowboys 16 – Game summary

Quarter	1	2	3	4	Total
Oilers (1–2)	3	3	7	0	13
Cowboys (2–2)	0	0	7	9	16

at Texas Stadium • Irving, Texas

- Date: August 18, 1979
- Game time: 8:00 p.m. CDT
- Game attendance: 62,803
- TV announcers (ABC): Frank Gifford (play–by–play), Howard Cosell (color commentator) and Fran Tarkenton (color commentator)

Team	Category	Player	Statistics
HOU	Passing		
HOU	Rushing		
HOU	Receiving		
DAL	Passing		
DAL	Rushing		
DAL	Receiving		

Scoring summary

Quarter	Time	Drive			Team	Scoring information	Score	
Quarter	Time	Plays	Yards	TOP	Team	Scoring information	HOU	DAL
"TOP" = time of possession. For other American football terms, see Glossary of American football.							13	16

- Point spread:
- Over/under:
- Time of game:

Oilers	Game statistics	Cowboys
	First downs	
	Rushes–yards	
	Passing yards	
	Passes	
	Sacked–yards	
	Net passing yards	
	Total yards	
	Return yards	
	Punts	
	Fumbles–lost	
	Penalties–yards	
	Time of possession	

=== Week P4 (Friday, August 24, 1979): at New Orleans Saints ===
Week P4: Houston Oilers 7 at New Orleans Saints 10 – Game summary

Quarter	1	2	3	4	Total
Oilers (1–3)	7	0	0	0	7
Saints (1–3)	0	0	0	10	10

at Louisiana Superdome • New Orleans, Louisiana

- Date: August 24, 1979
- Game time: 7:00 p.m. CDT
- Game weather: Indoors (dome)
- Game attendance: 54,469
- TV: KPRC-TV

Team	Category	Player	Statistics
HOU	Passing		
HOU	Rushing		
HOU	Receiving		
NO	Passing		
NO	Rushing		
NO	Receiving		

Scoring summary

Quarter	Time	Drive			Team	Scoring information	Score	
Quarter	Time	Plays	Yards	TOP	Team	Scoring information	HOU	NO
"TOP" = time of possession. For other American football terms, see Glossary of American football.							7	10

- Point spread:
- Over/under:
- Time of game:

Oilers	Game statistics	Saints
	First downs	
	Rushes–yards	
	Passing yards	
	Passes	
	Sacked–yards	
	Net passing yards	
	Total yards	
	Return yards	
	Punts	
	Fumbles–lost	
	Penalties–yards	
	Time of possession	

== Regular season ==
=== Schedule ===
Week	Date	Opponent	Result	Record	Venue	Attendance	Recap
1	September 2	at Washington Redskins	**W** 29–27	1–0	RFK Stadium	54,582	Recap
2	September 9	at **Pittsburgh Steelers**	**L** 7–38	1–1	Three Rivers Stadium	49,792	Recap
3	September 16	Kansas City Chiefs	**W** 20–6	2–1	Astrodome	45,684	Recap
4	September 23	at **Cincinnati Bengals**	**W** 30–27	3–1	Riverfront Stadium	45,615	Recap
5	September 30	**Cleveland Browns**	**W** 31–10	4–1	Astrodome	48,915	Recap
6	October 7	St. Louis Cardinals	**L** 17–24	4–2	Astrodome	53,043	Recap
7	October 14	at Baltimore Colts	**W** 28–16	5–2	Memorial Stadium	45,021	Recap
8	October 21	at Seattle Seahawks	**L** 14–34	5–3	Kingdome	60,705	Recap
9	October 28	New York Jets	**W** 27–24	6–3	Astrodome	45,825	Recap
10	November 5	at Miami Dolphins	**W** 9–6	7–3	Miami Orange Bowl	70,273	Recap
11	November 11	Oakland Raiders	**W** 31–17	8–3	Astrodome	48,614	Recap
12	November 18	**Cincinnati Bengals**	**W** 42–21	9–3	Astrodome	49,829	Recap
13	November 22	at Dallas Cowboys	**W** 30–24	10–3	Texas Stadium	63,897	Recap
14	December 2	at **Cleveland Browns**	**L** 7–14	10–4	Cleveland Municipal Stadium	69,112	Recap
15	December 10	**Pittsburgh Steelers**	**W** 20–17	11–4	Astrodome	55,293	Recap
16	December 16	Philadelphia Eagles	**L** 20–26	11–5	Astrodome	49,407	Recap
Note: Intra-division opponents are in **bold** text.

=== Standings ===
AFC Central
	W	L	T	PCT	DIV	CONF	PF	PA	STK
^{(2)} Pittsburgh Steelers	12	4	0	.750	4–2	9–3	416	262	W1
^{(4)} Houston Oilers	11	5	0	.688	4–2	9–3	362	331	L1
Cleveland Browns	9	7	0	.563	2–4	6–6	359	352	L2
Cincinnati Bengals	4	12	0	.250	2–4	2–10	337	421	W1

== Regular season game summaries ==
=== Week 1 (Sunday, September 2, 1979): at Washington Redskins ===
Week 1: Houston Oilers at Washington Redskins – Game summary

Quarter	1	2	3	4	Total
Oilers (1–0)	6	0	7	16	29
Redskins (0–1)	0	17	7	3	27

at RFK Stadium • Washington, D.C.

- Date: September 2, 1979
- Game time: 12:00 p.m. CDT
- Game weather: 80 °F (27 °C); relative humidity 85%; wind 11 mph (18 km/h)
- Game attendance: 54,582
- Referee: Gordon McCarter
- TV announcers (NBC): Jim Simpson (play–by–play) and John Brodie (color commentator)

Team	Category	Player	Statistics
HOU	Passing	Dan Pastorini	12/30, 176 YDS, 1 TD, 3 INTs
HOU	Rushing	Earl Campbell	32 CAR, 166 YDS, 2 TDs
HOU	Receiving	Billy Johnson	4 REC, 76 YDS, 1 TD
WSH	Passing	Joe Theismann	7/14, 123 YDS, 2 TDs, 1 INT
WSH	Rushing	Benny Malone	17 CAR, 58 YDS, 1 TD
WSH	Receiving	Jean Fugett	3 REC, 55 YDS, 2 TDs

Scoring summary

Quarter	Time	Drive			Team	Scoring information	Score	
Quarter	Time	Plays	Yards	TOP	Team	Scoring information	HOU	WSH
1					Oilers	41-yard field goal by Fritsch	3	0
1					Oilers	46-yard field goal by Fritsch	6	0
2					Redskins	27-yard field goal by Moseley	6	3
2					Redskins	Fugett 8-yard touchdown reception from Theismann, Moseley kick good	6	10
2					Redskins	Malone 1-yard touchdown run, Moseley kick good	6	17
3					Oilers	Campbell 13-yard touchdown run, Fritsch kick good	13	17
3					Redskins	Fugett 30-yard touchdown reception from Theismann, Moseley kick good	13	24
4					Redskins	39-yard field goal by Moseley	13	27
4					Oilers	Johnson 14-yard touchdown reception from Pastorini, Fritsch kick no good	19	27
4					Oilers	26-yard field goal by Fritsch	22	27
4					Oilers	Campbell 3-yard touchdown run, Fritsch kick good	29	27
"TOP" = time of possession. For other American football terms, see Glossary of American football.							29	27

- Point spread: Oilers –4
- Over/under: 33.0 (over)
- Time of game:

Oilers	Game statistics	Redskins
21	First downs	14
45–199	Rushes–yards	34–142
176	Passing yards	123
12–30–3	Passes	7–14–1
1–10	Sacked–yards	2–19
166	Net passing yards	104
365	Total yards	246
99	Return yards	215
3–45.7	Punts	4–36.5
1–0	Fumbles–lost	2–2
5–44	Penalties–yards	6–55
	Time of Possession	

Individual stats

Oilers Passing
	C/ATT^{1}	Yds	TD	INT	Sk	Yds	LG^{3}	Rate
Pastorini	12/30	176	1	3	1	10	35	31.4

Oilers Rushing
	Car^{2}	Yds	TD	LG^{3}
Campbell	32	166	2	18
Wilson	4	22	0	15
Carpenter	5	15	0	6
Barber	1	–2	0	–2
Pastorini	3	–2	0	3

Oilers Receiving
	Rec^{4}	Yds	TD	LG^{3}
Johnson	4	76	1	29
Burrough	3	66	0	35
Rucker	2	25	0	16
Campbell	2	2	0	4
Wilson	1	7	0	7

Oilers Kick Returns
	Ret	Yds	Y/Rt	TD	Lng
Johnson	4	37	9.3	0	0
King	1	17	17.0	0	0
Merkens	1	9	9.0	0	0

Oilers Punt Returns
	Ret	Yds	Y/Rt	TD	Lng
Johnson	1	16	16.0	0	0
Merkens	1	0	0.0	0	0

Oilers Punting
	Pnt	Yds	Y/P	Lng	Blck
Parsley	3	137	45.7		

Oilers Kicking
	FGM–FGA	XPM–XPA
Fritsch	3–3	2–3

Oilers Interceptions
	Int	Yds	TD	LG	PD
Reinfeldt	1	20	0	20	0

Starting Lineups

Position	Starting Lineups at Washington
Offense
WR	Ken Burrough
LT	Leon Gray
LG	Conway Hayman
C	Carl Mauck
RG	Ed Fisher
RT	Morris Towns
TE	Mike Barber
WR	Billy Johnson
QB	Dan Pastorini
RB	Earl Campbell
FB	Tim Wilson
Defense
LDE	Andy Dorris
NT	Curley Culp
RDE	Elvin Bethea
LOLB	Ted Washington
LILB	Gregg Bingham
RILB	Art Stringer
ROLB	Robert Brazile
LCB	J. C. Wilson
RCB	Greg Stemrick
SS	Vernon Perry
FS	Mike Reinfeldt

=== Week 2 (Sunday, September 9, 1979): at Pittsburgh Steelers ===
Week 2: Houston Oilers 7 at Pittsburgh Steelers 38 – Game summary

Quarter	1	2	3	4	Total
Oilers (1–1)	0	0	0	7	7
Steelers (2–0)	7	3	14	14	38

at Three Rivers Stadium • Pittsburgh, Pennsylvania

- Date: September 9, 1979
- Game time: 12:00 p.m. CDT
- Game weather: 55 °F (13 °C); relative humidity 69%; wind 7 mph (11 km/h)
- Game attendance: 49,792
- Referee: Pat Haggerty
- TV announcers (NBC): Dick Enberg (play–by–play) and Merlin Olsen (color commentator)

Team	Category	Player	Statistics
HOU	Passing	Gifford Nielsen	4/11, 41 YDS, 1 TD, 2 INTs
HOU	Rushing	Earl Campbell	16 CAR, 38 YDS
HOU	Receiving	Billy Johnson	2 REC, 32 YDS
PIT	Passing	Terry Bradshaw	12/29, 198 YDS, 2 TDs, 2 INTs
PIT	Rushing	Franco Harris	14 CAR, 42 YDS
PIT	Receiving	Lynn Swann	5 REC, 95 YDS

Scoring summary

Quarter	Time	Drive			Team	Scoring information	Score	
Quarter	Time	Plays	Yards	TOP	Team	Scoring information	HOU	PIT
1					Steelers	Thornton 1-yard touchdown run, Bahr kick good	0	7
2					Steelers	45-yard field goal by Bahr	0	10
3					Steelers	Thornton 16-yard touchdown reception from Bradshaw, Bahr kick good	0	17
3					Steelers	Hawthorne 8-yard touchdown run, Bahr kick good	0	24
4					Steelers	Smith 18-yard touchdown reception from Bradshaw, Bahr kick good	0	31
4		–	–	–	Steelers	Interception returned 41 yards for touchdown by Winston, Bahr kick good	0	38
4					Oilers	Merkens 9-yard touchdown reception from Nielsen, Fritsch kick good	7	38
"TOP" = time of possession. For other American football terms, see Glossary of American football.							7	38

- Point spread: Oilers +6
- Over/under: 37.0 (over)
- Time of game:

Oilers	Game statistics	Steelers
12	First downs	17
39–102	Rushes–yards	29–82
57	Passing yards	198
8–27–5	Passes	12–29–2
5–35	Sacked–yards	3–24
22	Net passing yards	174
124	Total yards	256
155	Return yards	160
9–46.1	Punts	7–40.1
4–1	Fumbles–lost	5–0
10–64	Penalties–yards	8–74
	Time of possession	

Individual stats

Oilers Passing
	C/ATT^{1}	Yds	TD	INT	Sk	Yds	LG^{3}	Rate
Nielsen	4/11	41	1	2	0	0	13	38.6
Pastorini	4/16	16	0	3	5	35	25	0.0

Oilers Rushing
	Car^{2}	Yds	TD	LG^{3}
Campbell	16	38	0	12
Coleman	7	22	0	9
Wilson	7	19	0	7
Clark	5	15	0	7
Carpenter	4	8	0	4

Oilers Receiving
	Rec^{4}	Yds	TD	LG^{3}
Johnson	2	32	0	25
Rucker	1	13	0	13
Renfro	1	12	0	12
Merkens	1	9	1	9
Earl Campbell	1	4	0	4
Carpenter	1	–3	0	–3
Wilson	1	–10	0	–10

Oilers Kick Returns
	Ret	Yds	Y/Rt	TD	Lng
Coleman	4	88	22.0	0	0
Wilson	2	30	15.0	0	0
Merkens	1	13	13.0	0	0

Oilers Punt Returns
	Ret	Yds	Y/Rt	TD	Lng
Johnson	3	1	0.3	0	0

Oilers Punting
	Pnt	Yds	Y/P	Lng	Blck
Parsley	9	415	46.1		

Oilers Kicking
	FGM–FGA	XPM–XPA
Fritsch		1–1

Oilers Sacks
	Sacks
Dorris	2.0
Culp	1.0

Oilers Interceptions
	Int	Yds	TD	LG	PD
Reinfeldt	1	23	0	23	0
Stringer	1	0	0	0	0

Starting Lineups

Position	Starting Lineups at Pittsburgh
Offense
WR	Ken Burrough
LT	Leon Gray
LG	Conway Hayman
C	Carl Mauck
RG	Ed Fisher
RT	Morris Towns
TE	Mike Barber
WR	Billy Johnson
QB	Dan Pastorini
RB	Earl Campbell
FB	Tim Wilson
Defense
LDE	Andy Dorris
NT	Curley Culp
RDE	Elvin Bethea
LOLB	Ted Washington
LILB	Gregg Bingham
RILB	Art Stringer
ROLB	Robert Brazile
LCB	J. C. Wilson
RCB	Greg Stemrick
SS	Vernon Perry
FS	Mike Reinfeldt

=== Week 6 (Sunday, October 7, 1979): vs. St. Louis Cardinals ===
Week 6: St. Louis Cardinals 24 at Houston Oilers 17 – Game summary

Quarter	1	2	3	4	Total
Cardinals (2–4)	0	7	3	14	24
Oilers (4–2)	0	14	0	3	17

at Astrodome • Houston, Texas

- Date: October 7, 1979
- Game time: 1:00 p.m. CDT
- Game weather: Indoors (dome)
- Game attendance: 53,043
- Referee: Fred Silva
- TV announcers (CBS): Frank Glieber (play–by–play) and John Madden (color commentator)

Team	Category	Player	Statistics
STL	Passing	Jim Hart	23/38, 253 YDS, 3 INTs
STL	Rushing	Ottis Anderson	16 CAR, 109 YDS
STL	Receiving	Pat Tilley	6 REC, 69 YDS
HOU	Passing	Dan Pastorini	15/29, 176 YDS, 1 TD, 2 INTs
HOU	Rushing	Earl Campbell	13 CAR, 53 YDS, 1 TD
HOU	Receiving	Ken Burrough	5 REC, 62 YDS, 1 TD

Scoring summary

Quarter	Time	Drive			Team	Scoring information	Score	
Quarter	Time	Plays	Yards	TOP	Team	Scoring information	STL	HOU
2					Cardinals	Brown 2-yard touchdown run, Little kick good	7	0
2					Oilers	Campbell 4-yard touchdown run, Fritsch kick good	7	7
2					Oilers	Burrough 11-yard touchdown reception from Pastorini, Fritsch kick good	7	14
3					Cardinals	24-yard field goal by Little	10	14
4					Oilers	51-yard field goal by Fritsch	10	17
4					Cardinals	Morris 1-yard touchdown run, Little kick good	17	17
4					Cardinals	Morris 6-yard touchdown run, Little kick good	24	17
"TOP" = time of possession. For other American football terms, see Glossary of American football.							24	17

- Point spread:
- Over/under:
- Time of game:

Cardinals	Game statistics	Oilers
	First downs	
	Rushes–yards	
	Passing yards	
	Passes	
	Sacked–yards	
	Net passing yards	
	Total yards	
	Return yards	
	Punts	
	Fumbles–lost	
	Penalties–yards	
	Time of Possession	

=== Week 10 (Monday, November 5, 1979): at Miami Dolphins ===
Week 10: Houston Oilers 9 at Miami Dolphins 6 – Game summary

Quarter	1	2	3	4	Total
Oilers (7–3)	0	3	6	0	9
Dolphins (6–4)	3	0	0	3	6

at Miami Orange Bowl • Miami, Florida

- Date: November 5, 1979
- Game time: 8:07 p.m. CST
- Game weather: 77 °F (25 °C); relative humidity 70%; wind 17 mph (27 km/h)
- Game attendance: 70,273
- Referee: Fred Wyant
- TV announcers (ABC): Frank Gifford (play–by–play), Howard Cosell (color commentator) and Don Meredith (color commentator)

Team	Category	Player	Statistics
HOU	Passing	Dan Pastorini	6/10, 25 YDS
HOU	Rushing	Earl Campbell	32 CAR, 120 YDS
HOU	Receiving	Tim Wilson	2 REC, 4 YDS
MIA	Passing	Bob Griese	14/26, 158 YDS, 2 INTs
MIA	Rushing	Gary Davis	16 CAR, 51 YDS
MIA	Receiving	Gary Davis	8 REC, 58 YDS

Scoring summary

Quarter	Time	Drive			Team	Scoring information	Score	
Quarter	Time	Plays	Yards	TOP	Team	Scoring information	HOU	MIA
1	4:55				Dolphins	32-yard field goal by von Schamann	0	3
2	14:56				Oilers	46-yard field goal by Fritsch	3	3
3	5:05				Oilers	48-yard field goal by Fritsch	6	3
3	0:02				Oilers	39-yard field goal by Fritsch	9	3
4	12:26				Dolphins	51-yard field goal by von Schamann	9	6
"TOP" = time of possession. For other American football terms, see Glossary of American football.							9	6

- Point spread: Oilers +3
- Over/under: 39.0 (under)
- Time of game: 2 hours, 46 minutes

Oilers	Game statistics	Dolphins
10	First downs	13
46–179	Rushes–yards	26–102
25	Passing yards	158
6–10–0	Passes	14–26–2
2–14	Sacked–yards	2–20
11	Net passing yards	138
190	Total yards	240
108	Return yards	72
7–36.9	Punts	5–38.8
0–0	Fumbles–lost	3–2
8–70	Penalties–yards	4–35
31:26	Time of Possession	28:34

Individual stats

Oilers Passing
	C/ATT^{1}	Yds	TD	INT	Sk	Yds	LG^{3}	Rate
Pastorini	6/10	25	0	0	2	14	24	64.6

Oilers Rushing
	Car^{2}	Yds	TD	LG^{3}
Campbell	32	120	0	11
Wilson	9	32	0	9
Pastorini	3	14	0	14
Caster	1	10	0	10
Carpenter	1	3	0	3

Oilers Receiving
	Rec^{4}	Yds	TD	LG^{3}
Wilson	2	4	0	3
Ken Burrough	1	24	0	24
Rob Carpenter	1	2	0	2
Conrad Rucker	1	2	0	2
Earl Campbell	1	–7	0	–7

Oilers Kick Returns
	Ret	Yds	Y/Rt	TD	Lng
Ellender	1	27	27.0	0	27
Hartwig	1	16	16.0	0	16

Oilers Punt Returns
	Ret	Yds	Y/Rt	TD	Lng
Ellender	2	11	5.5	0	0

Oilers Punting
	Pnt	Yds	Y/P	Lng	Blck
Parsley	7	255	36.4	0	

Oilers Kicking
	FGM–FGA	XPM–XPA
Fritsch	3–4	

Oilers Sacks
	Sacks
Kennard	1.0
Washington	1.0

Oilers Interceptions
	Int	Yds	TD	LG	PD
Bingham	1	54	0	54	
Perry	1	0	0	0	

- Missed field goals – Fritsch 48 (wide left)

Starting Lineups

Position	Starting Lineups at Miami
Offense
WR	Ken Burrough
LT	Leon Gray
LG	Conway Hayman
C	Carl Mauck
RG	Ed Fisher
RT	Morris Towns
TE	Mike Barber
WR	Rich Caster
QB	Dan Pastorini
RB	Earl Campbell
FB	Tim Wilson
Defense
LDE	Andy Dorris
NT	Curley Culp
RDE	Elvin Bethea
LOLB	Ted Washington
LILB	Gregg Bingham
RILB	Daryl Hunt
ROLB	Robert Brazile
LCB	J. C. Wilson
RCB	Greg Stemrick
SS	Vernon Perry
FS	Mike Reinfeldt

=== Week 13 (Thursday, November 22, 1979): at Dallas Cowboys ===
Week 13: Houston Oilers 30 at Dallas Cowboys 24 – Game summary

Quarter	1	2	3	4	Total
Oilers (10–3)	7	10	6	7	30
Cowboys (8–5)	14	7	0	3	24

at Texas Stadium • Irving, Texas

- Date: November 22, 1979
- Game time: 3:00 p.m. CST
- Game weather: 46 °F (8 °C); wind 16 mph (26 km/h)
- Game attendance: 63,897
- Referee: Gordon McCarter
- TV announcers (NBC): Dick Enberg (play–by–play), Merlin Olsen (color commentator) and Mike Adamle (sideline reporter)

Team	Category	Player	Statistics
HOU	Passing	Dan Pastorini	9/17, 163 YDS, 2 TDs
HOU	Rushing	Earl Campbell	33 CAR, 195 YDS, 2 TDs
HOU	Receiving	Ken Burrough	3 REC, 55 YDS, 1 TD
DAL	Passing	Roger Staubach	21/30, 287 YDS, 2 TDs, 2 INTs
DAL	Rushing	Tony Dorsett	12 CAR, 54 YDS, 1 TD
DAL	Receiving	Tony Dorsett	5 REC, 36 YDS

Scoring summary

Quarter	Time	Drive			Team	Scoring information	Score	
Quarter	Time	Plays	Yards	TOP	Team	Scoring information	HOU	DAL
1					Cowboys	Pearson 56-yard touchdown reception from Staubach, Septién kick good	0	7
1					Oilers	Campbell 61-yard touchdown run, Fritsch kick good	7	7
2					Cowboys	Newhouse 21-yard touchdown reception from Staubach, Septién kick good	7	14
2					Oilers	27-yard field goal by Fritsch	10	14
2					Cowboys	Dorsett 1-yard touchdown run, Septién kick good	10	21
2					Oilers	Campbell 27-yard touchdown run, Fritsch kick good	17	21
3					Oilers	Renfro 47-yard touchdown reception from Pastorini, Fritsch kick no good	23	21
4					Cowboys	44-yard field goal by Septién	23	24
4					Oilers	Burrough 32-yard touchdown reception from Pastorini, Fritsch kick good	30	24
"TOP" = time of possession. For other American football terms, see Glossary of American football.							30	24

- Point spread: Oilers +1
- Over/under: 41.0 (over)
- Time of game:

Oilers	Game statistics	Cowboys
17	First downs	20
41–224	Rushes–yards	30–92
163	Passing yards	287
9–17–0	Passes	21–30–2
1–9	Sacked–yards	1–8
154	Net passing yards	279
378	Total yards	371
113	Return yards	124
4–44.5	Punts	3–36.7
1–0	Fumbles–lost	2–1
4–45	Penalties–yards	7–42
	Time of Possession	

Individual stats

Oilers Passing
	C/ATT^{1}	Yds	TD	INT	Sk	Yds	LG^{3}	Rate
Pastorini	9/17	163	2	0	1	9	47	125.4

Oilers Rushing
	Car^{2}	Yds	TD	LG^{3}
Campbell	33	195	2	61
Wilson	4	17	0	7
Carpenter	3	14	0	7
Pastorini	1	–2	0	–2

Oilers Receiving
	Rec^{4}	Yds	TD	LG^{3}
Burrough	3	55	1	32
Renfro	2	53	1	47
Barber	2	16	0	11
Caster	1	29	0	29
Carpenter	1	10	0	10

Oilers Kick Returns
	Ret	Yds	Y/Rt	TD	Lng
Coleman	2	51	25.5	0	0
Hartwig	2	28	14.0	0	0
Ellender	1	18	18.0	0	18

Oilers Punt Returns
	Ret	Yds	Y/Rt	TD	Lng
Ellender	1	7	7.0	0	7

Oilers Punting
	Pnt	Yds	Y/P	Lng	Blck
Parsley	4	178	44.5	0	

Oilers Kicking
	FGM–FGA	XPM–XPA
Fritsch	1–1	3–4

Oilers Sacks
	Sacks
Bethea	1.0

Oilers Interceptions
	Int	Yds	TD	LG	PD
Perry	1	9	0	9	0
Wilson	1	0	0	0	0

Starting Lineups

Position	Starting Lineups at Dallas
Offense
WR	Ken Burrough
LT	Leon Gray
LG	Conway Hayman
C	Carl Mauck
RG	Ed Fisher
RT	Morris Towns
TE	Mike Barber
WR	Rich Caster
QB	Dan Pastorini
RB	Earl Campbell
FB	Tim Wilson
Defense
LDE	Andy Dorris
NT	Curley Culp
RDE	Elvin Bethea
LOLB	Ted Washington
LILB	Gregg Bingham
RILB	Daryl Hunt
ROLB	Robert Brazile
LCB	J. C. Wilson
RCB	Greg Stemrick
SS	Vernon Perry
FS	Mike Reinfeldt

=== Week 15 (Monday, December 10, 1979): vs. Pittsburgh Steelers ===
Week 15: Pittsburgh Steelers 17 at Houston Oilers 20 – Game summary

Quarter	1	2	3	4	Total
Steelers (11–4)	0	0	3	14	17
Oilers (11–4)	0	7	3	10	20

at Astrodome • Houston, Texas

- Date: December 10, 1979
- Game time: 8:00 p.m. CST
- Game weather: Indoors (dome)
- Game attendance: 55,293
- Referee: Jerry Markbreit
- TV announcers (ABC): Frank Gifford (play–by–play), Howard Cosell (color commentator) and Fran Tarkenton (color commentator)

Team	Category	Player	Statistics
PIT	Passing	Terry Bradshaw	14/29, 237 YDS, 1 TD, 2 INTs
PIT	Rushing	Franco Harris	12 CAR, 59 YDS
PIT	Receiving	Lynn Swann	4 REC, 50 YDS
HOU	Passing	Dan Pastorini	10/16, 170 YDS, 1 TD
HOU	Rushing	Earl Campbell	33 CAR, 109 YDS
HOU	Receiving	Ken Burrough	3 REC, 48 YDS, 1 TD

Scoring summary

Quarter	Time	Drive			Team	Scoring information	Score	
Quarter	Time	Plays	Yards	TOP	Team	Scoring information	PIT	HOU
2		1	25		Oilers	Burrough 25-yard touchdown reception from Pastorini, Fritsch kick good	0	7
3					Steelers	37-yard field goal by Bahr	3	7
3					Oilers	24-yard field goal by Fritsch	3	10
4					Oilers	34-yard field goal by Fritsch	3	13
4					Steelers	Swann 9-yard touchdown run, Bahr kick good	10	13
4					Oilers	Carpenter 4-yard touchdown run, Fritsch kick good	10	20
4					Steelers	Stallworth 34-yard touchdown reception from Bradshaw, Bahr kick good	17	20
"TOP" = time of possession. For other American football terms, see Glossary of American football.							17	20

- Point spread: Oilers +3
- Over/under: 42.5 (under)
- Time of game:

Steelers	Game statistics	Oilers
15	First downs	20
22–120	Rushes–yards	54–190
237	Passing yards	170
14–29–2	Passes	10–17–0
3–19	Sacked–yards	1–10
218	Net passing yards	160
338	Total yards	350
114	Return yards	113
4–46.0	Punts	5–34.8
1–0	Fumbles–lost	1–0
10–79	Penalties–yards	4–28
	Time of possession	

Individual stats

Oilers Passing
	C/ATT^{1}	Yds	TD	INT	Sk	Yds	LG^{3}	Rate
Pastorini	10/16	170	1	0	1	10	25	119.3
Nielsen	0/1	0	0	0	0	0	0	39.6

Oilers Rushing
	Car^{2}	Yds	TD	LG^{3}
Campbell	33	109	0	31
Wilson	10	47	0	10
Carpenter	7	25	1	7
Barber	1	6	0	6
Caster	1	5	0	1
Clark	1	0	0	0
Pastorini	1	–2	0	–2

Oilers Receiving
	Rec^{4}	Yds	TD	LG^{3}
Burrough	3	48	1	25
Campbell	2	22	0	16
Renfro	1	25	0	25
Caster	1	24	0	24
Barber	1	17	0	17
Carpenter	1	12	0	12

Oilers Kick Returns
	Ret	Yds	Y/Rt	TD	Lng
Coleman	2	37	18.5	0	0
Hartwig	1	23	23.0	0	0

Oilers Punt Returns
	Ret	Yds	Y/Rt	TD	Lng
Ellender	2	6	3.0	0	0

Oilers Punting
	Pnt	Yds	Y/P	Lng	Blck
Parsley	5	174	34.8		

Oilers Kicking
	FGM–FGA	XPM–XPA	MFG
Fritsch	2–3	2–2	44

Oilers Sacks
	Sacks
Baker	1.0
Stensrud	1.0
Dorris	0.5
Perry	0.5

Oilers Interceptions
	Int	Yds	TD	LG	PD
Brazile	1	26	0	26	0
Stringer	1	21	0	21	0

Starting Lineups

Position	Starting Lineups vs. Pittsburgh
Offense
WR	Ken Burrough
LT	Leon Gray
LG	Conway Hayman
C	Carl Mauck
RG	Ed Fisher
RT	Morris Towns
TE	Mike Barber
WR	Rich Caster
QB	Dan Pastorini
RB	Earl Campbell
FB	Tim Wilson
Defense
LDE	Andy Dorris
NT	Curley Culp
RDE	Elvin Bethea
LOLB	Ted Washington
LILB	Gregg Bingham
RILB	Art Stringer
ROLB	Robert Brazile
LCB	J. C. Wilson
RCB	Greg Stemrick
SS	Vernon Perry
FS	Mike Reinfeldt

=== Week 16 (Sunday, December 16, 1979): vs. Philadelphia Eagles ===
Week 16: Philadelphia Eagles 26 at Houston Oilers 20 – Game summary

Quarter	1	2	3	4	Total
Eagles (11–5)	9	3	7	7	26
Oilers (11–5)	0	10	0	10	20

at Astrodome • Houston, Texas

- Date: December 16, 1979
- Game time: 3:00 p.m. CST
- Game weather: Indoors (dome)
- Game attendance: 49,407
- Referee: Red Cashion
- TV announcers (CBS): Gary Bender (play–by–play) and Sonny Jurgensen (color commentator)

Team	Category	Player	Statistics
PHI	Passing	Ron Jaworski	12/21, 163 YDS
PHI	Rushing	Billy Campfield	7 CAR, 68 YDS
PHI	Receiving	Wilbert Montgomery	5 REC, 51 YDS
HOU	Passing	Dan Pastorini	7/14, 85 YDS, 1 TD, 2 INTs
HOU	Rushing	Earl Campbell	16 CAR, 134 YDS, 1 TD
HOU	Receiving	Mike Renfro	3 REC, 67 YDS, 1 TD

Scoring summary

Quarter	Time	Drive			Team	Scoring information	Score	
Quarter	Time	Plays	Yards	TOP	Team	Scoring information	PHI	HOU
1	9:36	4	34	1:08	Eagles	Jaworski 4-yard touchdown run, Franklin kick good	6	0
1	3:06	6	39	1:44	Eagles	22-yard field goal by Franklin	9	0
2	3:47	5	22	1:56	Oilers	Campbell 6-yard touchdown run, Fritsch kick good	9	7
2	0:33	12	61	3:14	Eagles	41-yard field goal by Franklin	12	7
2	0:00	4	44	0:33	Oilers	44-yard field goal by Fritsch	12	10
3	5:10	9	76	5:22	Eagles	Harris 1-yard touchdown run, Franklin kick good	19	10
4	14:55	9	78	5:15	Oilers	Renfro 7-yard touchdown reception from Pastorini, Fritsch kick good	19	17
4	11:57	7	72	2:58	Eagles	Fitzkee 7-yard touchdown reception from Walton, Franklin kick good	26	17
4	4:23	9	46	3:41	Oilers	37-yard field goal by Fritsch	26	20
"TOP" = time of possession. For other American football terms, see Glossary of American football.							26	20

- Point spread: Oilers –4
- Over/under: 39.0 (over)
- Time of game: 3 hours, 15 minutes

Eagles	Game statistics	Oilers
20	First downs	19
31–168	Rushes–yards	40–235
202	Passing yards	137
16–29–0	Passes	12–27–3
0–0	Sacked–yards	4–33
202	Net passing yards	104
370	Total yards	339
156	Return yards	143
5–42.6	Punts	5–42.0
1–1	Fumbles–lost	0–0
5–40	Penalties–yards	8–49
26:59	Time of Possession	33:01

Individual stats

Oilers Passing
	C/ATT^{1}	Yds	TD	INT	Sk	Yds	LG^{3}	Rate
Pastorini	7/14	85	1	2	1	7	49	53.3
Nielsen	5/13	52	0	1	3	26	20	18.7

Oilers Rushing
	Car^{2}	Yds	TD	LG^{3}
Campbell	16	134	1	37
Carpenter	10	45	0	12
Coleman	5	27	0	10
Wilson	5	14	0	5
Caster	1	6	0	6
Pastorini	1	5	0	5
Clark	2	4	0	4

Oilers Receiving
	Rec^{4}	Yds	TD	LG^{3}
Renfro	3	67	1	49
Merkens	2	35	0	20
Caster	2	17	0	12
Wilson	1	7	0	7
Groth	1	6	0	6
Campbell	1	4	0	4
Carpenter	1	1	0	1
Clark	1	0	0	0

Oilers Kick Returns
	Ret	Yds	Y/Rt	TD	Lng
Ellender	6	130	21.7	0	0

Oilers Punt Returns
	Ret	Yds	Y/Rt	TD	Lng
Ellender	3	13	4.3	0	0

Oilers Punting
	Pnt	Yds	Y/P	Lng	Blck
Parsley	5	210	42.0	0	

Oilers Kicking
	FGM–FGA	XPM–XPA
Fritsch	2–2	2–2

Starting Lineups

Position	Starting Lineups vs. Philadelphia
Offense
WR	Ken Burrough
LT	Leon Gray
LG	Conway Hayman
C	Carl Mauck
RG	Ed Fisher
RT	Morris Towns
TE	Mike Barber
WR	Rich Caster
QB	Dan Pastorini
RB	Earl Campbell
FB	Tim Wilson
Defense
LDE	Andy Dorris
NT	Curley Culp
RDE	Elvin Bethea
LOLB	Ted Washington
LILB	Gregg Bingham
RILB	Art Stringer
ROLB	Robert Brazile
LCB	J. C. Wilson
RCB	Greg Stemrick
SS	Vernon Perry
FS	Mike Reinfeldt

== Postseason ==
=== Playoffs ===
Round	Date	Opponent (seed)	Result	Venue	Attendance	Recap
Wild Card	December 23	Denver Broncos (5)	W 13–7	Astrodome	48,776	Recap
Divisional	December 29	at San Diego Chargers (1)	W 17–14	San Diego Stadium	51,192	Recap
AFC Championship	January 6	at Pittsburgh Steelers (2)	L 13–27	Three Rivers Stadium	50,475	Recap

=== 1979 AFC Wild Card Playoffs (Sunday, December 23, 1979): vs. (A5) Denver Broncos ===
1979 AFC Wild Card Playoffs: Denver Broncos 7 at Houston Oilers 13 – Game summary

Quarter	1	2	3	4	Total
Broncos (0–1)	7	0	0	0	7
Oilers (1–0)	3	7	0	3	13

at Astrodome • Houston, Texas

- Date: December 23, 1979
- Game time: 3:00 p.m. CST
- Game weather: Indoors (dome)
- Game attendance: 48,776
- Referee: Gene Barth
- TV announcers (NBC): Charlie Jones (play–by–play), Len Dawson (color commentator) and Mike Adamle (sideline reporter)

Team	Category	Player	Statistics
DEN	Passing		
DEN	Rushing		
DEN	Receiving		
HOU	Passing		
HOU	Rushing		
HOU	Receiving		

Scoring summary

Quarter	Time	Drive			Team	Scoring information	Score	
Quarter	Time	Plays	Yards	TOP	Team	Scoring information	DEN	HOU
1	10:02				Oilers	31-yard field goal by Fritsch	0	3
1	3:27				Broncos	Preston 7-yard touchdown reception from Morton, Turner kick good	7	3
2	0:46				Oilers	Campbell 3-yard touchdown run, Fritsch kick good	7	10
4	4:18				Oilers	20-yard field goal by Fritsch	7	13
"TOP" = time of possession. For other American football terms, see Glossary of American football.							7	13

- Point spread:
- Over/under:
- Time of game:

Broncos	Game statistics	Oilers
	First downs	
	Rushes–yards	
	Passing yards	
	Passes	
	Sacked–yards	
	Net passing yards	
	Total yards	
	Return yards	
	Punts	
	Fumbles–lost	
	Penalties–yards	
	Time of possession	

The Oilers managed to shut down the Broncos offense for most of the game en route to a 13–7 win.

=== 1979 AFC Divisional Playoffs (Saturday, December 29, 1979): at (A1) San Diego Chargers ===
1979 AFC Divisional Playoffs: Houston Oilers 17 at San Diego Chargers 14 – Game summary

Quarter	1	2	3	4	Total
Oilers (2–0)	0	10	7	0	17
Chargers (0–1)	7	0	7	0	14

at San Diego Stadium • San Diego, California

- Date: December 29, 1979
- Game time: 3:00 p.m. CST
- Game weather: 60 °F (16 °C); relative humidity 37%; wind 8 mph (13 km/h); sunny
- Game attendance: 51,192
- Referee: Ben Dreith
- TV announcers (NBC): Dick Enberg (play–by–play), Merlin Olsen (color commentator) and Mike Adamle (sideline reporter)

Team	Category	Player	Statistics
HOU	Passing	Gifford Nielsen	11/19, 111 YDS, 1 TD, 1 INT
HOU	Rushing	Rob Carpenter	18 CAR, 67 YDS
HOU	Receiving	Rob Carpenter	4 REC, 23 YDS
SD	Passing	Dan Fouts	25/47, 333 YDS, 5 INTs
SD	Rushing	Lydell Mitchell	8 CAR, 33 YDS
SD	Receiving	Bob Klein	5 REC, 41 YDS

Scoring summary

Quarter	Time	Drive			Team	Scoring information	Score	
Quarter	Time	Plays	Yards	TOP	Team	Scoring information	HOU	SD
1	4:49				Chargers	Williams 1-yard touchdown run, Wood kick good	0	7
2	4:02				Oilers	26-yard field goal by Fritsch	3	7
2	0:19				Oilers	Clark 1-yard touchdown run, Fritsch kick good	10	7
3	13:08				Chargers	Mitchell 8-yard touchdown run, Wood kick good	10	14
3	2:05				Oilers	Renfro 47-yard touchdown reception from Nielsen, Fritsch kick good	17	14
"TOP" = time of possession. For other American football terms, see Glossary of American football.							17	14

- Point spread: Oilers +8
- Over/under:
- Time of game:

Oilers	Game statistics	Chargers
15	First downs	25
40–148	Rushes–yards	19–63
111	Passing yards	333
11–19–0	Passes	25–47–5
0–0	Sacked–yards	2–16
111	Net passing yards	317
259	Total yards	380
89	Return yards	113
6–40.7	Punts	2–32.0
0–0	Fumbles–lost	0–0
5–45	Penalties–yards	6–30
30:06	Time of possession	29:54

Individual stats

Oilers Passing
	C/ATT^{1}	Yds	TD	INT	Sk	Yds	LG^{3}	Rate
Nielsen	11/19	111	1	1	0	0	47	65.9

Oilers Rushing
	Car^{2}	Yds	TD	LG^{3}
Carpenter	18	67	0	11
Wilson	11	39	0	14
Clark	9	30	1	11
Nielsen	2	12	0	14

Oilers Receiving
	Rec^{4}	Yds	TD	LG^{3}
Carpenter	4	23	0	7
Wilson	3	16	0	10
Renfro	1	47	1	47
Coleman	1	13	0	13
Barber	1	12	0	12

Oilers Kick Returns
	Ret	Yds	Y/Rt	TD	Lng
Hartwig	2	37	18.5	0	24
Ellender	1	16	16.0	0	16

Oilers Punt Returns
	Ret	Yds	Y/Rt	TD	Lng
Ellender	1	25	25.0	0	25

Oilers Punting
	Pnt	Yds	Y/P	Lng	Blck
Parsley	6	244	40.7	50	

Oilers Kicking
	FGM–FGA	XPM–XPA
Fritsch	1–1	2–2

Oilers Sacks
	Sacks
Bethea	1.0
Dorris	1.0

Oilers Interceptions
	Int	Yds	TD	LG	PD
Perry	4	0	0	0	0
Wilson	1	3	0	3	0
Reinfeldt	0	8	0	8	0

Starting Lineups

Position	Starting Lineups 1979 AFC Divisional Playoffs at San Diego
Offense
WR	Mike Renfro
LT	Leon Gray
LG	David Carter
C	Carl Mauck
RG	Ed Fisher
RT	Conway Hayman
TE	Mike Barber
WR	Rich Caster
QB	Gifford Nielsen
RB	Rob Carpenter
FB	Tim Wilson
Defense
LDE	Andy Dorris
NT	Curley Culp
RDE	Elvin Bethea
LOLB	Ted Washington
LILB	Gregg Bingham
RILB	Art Stringer
ROLB	Robert Brazile
LCB	J. C. Wilson
RCB	Greg Stemrick
SS	Vernon Perry
FS	Mike Reinfeldt

The Oilers offense, playing without starting quarterback Dan Pastorini, receiver Ken Burrough, and running back Earl Campbell, could only generate 259 yards compared to San Diego's 380. But they still won the game, largely due to the effort of rookie safety Vernon Perry, who set a playoff record with 4 interceptions as the Oilers defeated the Chargers, 17–14. In his first career playoff game, Chargers future Hall of Fame quarterback Dan Fouts threw for 333 yards, but was intercepted 5 times.

=== 1979 AFC Championship Game (Sunday, January 6, 1980): at (A2) Pittsburgh Steelers ===
1979 AFC Championship Game: Houston Oilers 13 at Pittsburgh Steelers 27 – Game summary

Quarter	1	2	3	4	Total
Oilers (2–1)	7	3	0	3	13
Steelers (2–0)	3	14	0	10	27

at Three Rivers Stadium • Pittsburgh, Pennsylvania

- Date: January 6, 1980
- Game time: 12:00 Noon CST
- Game weather: 18 °F (−8 °C); relative humidity 66%; wind 11 mph (18 km/h); wind chill 3 °F (−16 °C); cloudy
- Game attendance: 50,475
- Referee: Jim Tunney
- TV announcers (NBC): Dick Enberg (play–by–play), Merlin Olsen (color commentator) and Sam Nover (sideline reporter)

Team	Category	Player	Statistics
HOU	Passing	Dan Pastorini	19/28, 203 YDS, 1 INT
HOU	Rushing	Earl Campbell	17 CAR, 15 YDS
HOU	Receiving	Tim Wilson	7 REC, 60 YDS
PIT	Passing	Terry Bradshaw	18/30, 219 YDS, 2 TDs, 1 INT
PIT	Rushing	Franco Harris	21 CAR, 85 YDS
PIT	Receiving	Franco Harris	6 REC, 50 YDS

Scoring summary

Quarter	Time	Drive			Team	Scoring information	Score	
Quarter	Time	Plays	Yards	TOP	Team	Scoring information	HOU	PIT
1	12:30	–	–	–	Oilers	Interception returned 75 yards for touchdown by Perry, Fritsch kick good	7	0
1	3:55				Steelers	21-yard field goal by Bahr	7	3
2	14:12				Oilers	21-yard field goal by Fritsch	10	3
2	9:33				Steelers	Cunningham 16-yard touchdown reception from Bradshaw, Bahr kick good	10	10
2	2:34				Steelers	Stallworth 20-yard touchdown reception from Bradshaw, Bahr kick good	10	17
4	14:57				Oilers	23-yard field goal by Fritsch	13	17
4	9:50				Steelers	39-yard field goal by Bahe	13	20
4	0:54				Steelers	Bleier 4-yard touchdown run, Bahr kick good	13	27
"TOP" = time of possession. For other American football terms, see Glossary of American football.							13	27

- Point spread: Oilers +9½
- Over/under:
- Time of game:

Oilers	Game statistics	Steelers
11	First downs	22
22–24	Rushes–yards	36–161
212	Passing yards	219
20–29–1	Passes	18–30–1
1–9	Sacked–yards	3–22
203	Net passing yards	197
227	Total yards	358
147	Return yards	90
4–30.0	Punts	3–51.0
4–2	Fumbles–lost	1–1
2–10	Penalties–yards	5–34
27:06	Time of possession	32:54

Individual stats

Oilers Passing
	C/ATT^{1}	Yds	TD	INT	Sk	Yds	LG^{3}	Rate
Pastorini	19/28	203	0	1	1	9	41	74.0
Nielsen	1/1	9	0	0	0	0	9	104.2

Oilers Rushing
	Car^{2}	Yds	TD	LG^{3}
Campbell	17	15	0	7
Wilson	4	9	0	5
Caster	1	0	0	0

Oilers Receiving
	Rec^{4}	Yds	TD	LG^{3}
Wilson	7	60	0	41
Carpenter	5	23	0	14
Renfro	3	52	0	19
Coleman	2	46	0	32
Merkens	1	12	0	12
Campbell	1	11	0	11
Barber	1	8	0	8

Oilers Kick Returns
	Ret	Yds	Y/Rt	TD	Lng
Ellender	4	47	11.8	0	19
Hartwig	1	13	13.0	0	13
Carpenter	1	4	4.0	0	4

Oilers Punt Returns
	Ret	Yds	Y/Rt	TD	Lng
Ellender	3	8	2.7	0	5

Oilers Punting
	Pnt	Yds	Y/P	Lng	Blck
Parsley	4	120	30.0		

Oilers Kicking
	FGM–FGA	XPM–XPA
Fritsch	2–2	1–1

Oilers Sacks
	Sacks
Bethea	1.0
Dorris	1.0
Stensrud	1.0

Oilers Interceptions
	Int	Yds	TD	LG	PD
Perry	1	75	1	75	0

Starting Lineups

Position	Starting Lineups 1979 AFC Championship Game at Pittsburgh
Offense
WR	Ken Burrough
LT	Leon Gray
LG	David Carter
C	Carl Mauck
RG	Ed Fisher
RT	Conway Hayman
TE	Mike Barber
WR	Rich Caster
QB	Dan Pastorini
RB	Earl Campbell
FB	Tim Wilson
Defense
LDE	Andy Dorris
NT	Curley Culp
RDE	Elvin Bethea
LOLB	Ted Washington
LILB	Gregg Bingham
RILB	Art Stringer
ROLB	Robert Brazile
LCB	J. C. Wilson
RCB	Greg Stemrick
SS	Vernon Perry
FS	Mike Reinfeldt

The Steelers held the Oilers to only 24 rushing yards, but were also aided by a controversial non-touchdown call on Mike Renfro to come away with a 27–13 win. This was the last time an NFL team based in Houston reached the AFC Championship Game, and the closest any franchise in Houston got to going to the Super Bowl.

== Awards and records ==
- Earl Campbell, NFL Rushing Leader, (1,697)
- Earl Campbell, 1979 NFL MVP
- Earl Campbell, PFWA NFL MVP (1979)
- Earl Campbell, Pro Bowl selection 1979
- Earl Campbell, All-Pro selection 1979
- Earl Campbell, NEA NFL MVP (1979)
- Earl Campbell, NFL Offensive Player of the Year (1979)
- Earl Campbell, 1979 Bert Bell Award
- Earl Campbell, Houston Oilers record, Most Touchdowns in a Season (19)
- Mike Reinfeldt, NFL Interception Leader, 12

=== Milestones ===
- Earl Campbell, 2nd 1,000 yard rushing season
- Earl Campbell, 2nd NFL Rushing Title
