= 1981 Houston Oilers season =

NFL team season

- Owner: Bud Adams
- General manager: Ladd Herzeg
- Head coach: Ed Biles
- Home stadium: Houston Astrodome

Results
- Record: 7–9
- Division place: 3rd AFC Central
- Playoffs: Did not qualify
- All-Pros: LB Robert Brazile (2nd team)
- Pro Bowlers: T Leon Gray; RB Earl Campbell; LB Robert Brazile; KR Carl Roaches

The 1981 Houston Oilers season was the franchise's 22nd overall and the 12th in the National Football League (NFL). Bum Phillips was fired as head coach during the offseason for failing to reach the Super Bowl, and replaced by Ed Biles. However, the Oilers defensive problems would catch up with them as they finished with a disappointing 7–9 record, as Earl Campbell fought through injuries to rush for 1,376 yards. After a fast 4–2 start, Houston would struggle in the second half, going 3–7 in their final 10 games, including a critical loss to the New Orleans Saints, who finished 4–12 in 1981.

== Offseason ==
=== NFL draft ===
1981 Houston Oilers draft
Round	Pick	Player	Position	College	Notes
3	79	Mike Holston	Wide receiver	Morgan State	
4	106	Nick Eyre	Offensive tackle	BYU	
5	133	Delbert Fowler	Linebacker	West Virginia	
6	159	Bill Kay	Defensive back	Purdue	
7	193	Don Washington	Defensive back	Texas A&M–Kingsville	
8	217	Willie Tullis	Defensive back	Troy	
9	243	Avon Riley	Linebacker	UCLA	
10	270	Larry Jones	Running back	Colorado State	
11	297	Claude Matthews	Guard	Auburn	
12	324	Bill Capece	Placekicker	Florida State	
Made roster

== Personnel ==
=== Staff ===
1981 Houston Oilers staff
Front office: Owner/Chairman of the Board/President – Bud Adams; Executive Vice President/General Manager – Ladd Herzeg; Head coaches: Head Coach – Ed Biles; Offensive coaches: Offensive Coordinator – Jim Shofner; Offensive Backs – Elijah Pitts; Receivers – Andy Bourgeois; Offensive Line – Ray Callahan	Defensive coaches: Defensive Coordinator – Dick Nolan; Defensive Line – Joe Galat; Linebackers – Dick Selcer; Defensive Backs – Bob Gambold

=== Roster ===
1981 Houston Oilers roster
Quarterbacks (QB): 14 Gifford Nielsen; 8 John Reaves; 12 Ken Stabler; Running backs (RB): 39 Adger Armstrong; 34 Earl Campbell; 47 Ronnie Coleman; 28 Rich Thomaselli; 45 Tim Wilson; Wide receivers (WR): 11 Harold Bailey; 88 Billy Brooks; 00 Ken Burrough; 84 Mike Holston; 85 Carl Roaches; 83 Tim Smith; Tight ends (TE): 86 Mike Barber; 87 Dave Casper	Offensive linemen (OL): 58 David Carter C; 66 Greg Davidson C; 77 Angelo Fields T; 60 Ed Fisher G; 74 Leon Gray T; 55 Carl Mauck C; 62 John Schuhmacher G; 76 Morris Towns T; Defensive linemen (DL): 75 Jesse Baker DE; 65 Elvin Bethea DE; 69 Andy Dorris DE; 71 Ken Kennard NT; 90 Daryle Skaugstad DT; 67 Mike Stensrud DE	Linebackers (LB): 54 Gregg Bingham ILB; 52 Robert Brazile OLB; 50 Daryl Hunt ILB; 53 Avon Riley OLB; 56 Art Stringer ILB; 51 Ted Thompson ILB; 59 Ted Washington OLB; Defensive backs (DB): 36 Carter Hartwig CB/S; 22 Bill Kay CB; 32 Vernon Perry SS; 37 Mike Reinfeldt FS; 27 Greg Stemrick CB; 20 Willie Tullis SS; 33 J. C. Wilson CB; Special teams (ST): 16 Toni Fritsch K; 18 Cliff Parsley P	Reserve: 57 John Corker OLB (IR); 78 Nick Eyre T (IR); 44 Delbert Fowler LB (IR); 23 Larry Jones RB (IR); 79 Claude Mathews G (IR); 64 George Reihner G (Ret.); 82 Mike Renfro WR (IR); 68 Ralph Williams T (IR); Rookies in italics

== Regular season ==
=== Schedule ===
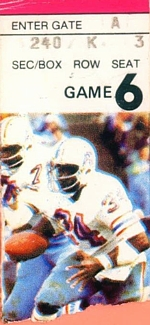
A ticket for an October 26, 1981 game between the Oilers and the Pittsburgh Steelers.

Week	Date	Opponent	Result	Record	Game site	NFL.com recap
1	September 6	at Los Angeles Rams	W 27–20	1–0	Anaheim Stadium	Recap
2	September 13	at **Cleveland Browns**	W 9–3	2–0	Cleveland Stadium	Recap
3	September 20	Miami Dolphins	**L** 10–16	2–1	Astrodome	Recap
4	September 27	at New York Jets	**L** 17–33	2–2	Shea Stadium	Recap
5	October 4	**Cincinnati Bengals**	**W** 17–10	3–2	Astrodome	Recap
6	October 11	Seattle Seahawks	**W** 35–17	4–2	Astrodome	Recap
7	October 18	at New England Patriots	**L** 10–38	4–3	Schaefer Stadium	Recap
8	October 26	at **Pittsburgh Steelers**	**L** 13–26	4–4	Three Rivers Stadium	Recap
9	November 1	at **Cincinnati Bengals**	**L** 21–34	4–5	Riverfront Stadium	Recap
10	November 8	Oakland Raiders	**W** 17–16	5–5	Astrodome	Recap
11	November 15	at Kansas City Chiefs	**L** 10–23	5–6	Arrowhead Stadium	Recap
12	November 22	New Orleans Saints	**L** 24–27	5–7	Astrodome	Recap
13	November 29	Atlanta Falcons	**L** 27–31	5–8	Astrodome	Recap
14	December 3	**Cleveland Browns**	**W** 17–13	6–8	Astrodome	Recap
15	December 13	at San Francisco 49ers	**L** 6–28	6–9	Candlestick Park	Recap
16	December 20	**Pittsburgh Steelers**	**W** 21–20	7–9	Astrodome	Recap
Note: Intra-division opponents are in **bold** text.

=== Standings ===
AFC Central
	W	L	T	PCT	DIV	CONF	PF	PA	STK
Cincinnati Bengals^{(1)}	12	4	0	.750	4–2	10–2	421	304	W2
Pittsburgh Steelers	8	8	0	.500	3–3	5–7	356	297	L3
Houston Oilers	7	9	0	.438	4–2	6–6	281	355	W1
Cleveland Browns	5	11	0	.313	1–5	2–10	276	375	L5
