= 1977 Houston Oilers season =

NFL team season

- Owner: Bud Adams
- General manager: Bum Phillips
- Head coach: Bum Phillips
- Home stadium: Houston Astrodome

Results
- Record: 8–6
- Division place: 2nd AFC Central
- Playoffs: Did not qualify
- All-Pros: LB Robert Brazile (1st team); PR/KR Billy "White Shoes" Johnson (1st team); DL Curley Culp (2nd team); WR Ken Burrough (2nd team)
- Pro Bowlers: DT Elvin Bethea; DL Curley Culp; LB Robert Brazile

The 1977 Houston Oilers season was the 18th season overall and eighth with the National Football League (NFL). The Oilers won three of their first four games, which was capped by a 27–10 win over the Pittsburgh Steelers in the Astrodome. However, injuries would hamper the Oilers chances as they lost five of their next six games. The team improved upon their previous season's output of 5–9, winning eight games, but failed to qualify for the playoffs for the eighth consecutive season.

== Offseason ==
=== NFL draft ===
1977 Houston Oilers draft
Round	Pick	Player	Position	College	Notes
1	11	Morris Towns	Offensive tackle	Missouri	
2	38	George Reihner	Offensive guard	Penn State	
3	66	Tim Wilson	Running back	Maryland	
3	70	Jimmie Giles *	Tight end	Alcorn State	
3	84	Rob Carpenter	Running back	Miami (OH)	
4	98	Warren Anderson	Wide receiver	West Virginia State	
6	148	Gary Woolford	Cornerback	Florida State	
6	165	David Carter	Center	Western Kentucky	
8	198	Steve Davis	Wide receiver	Georgia	
8	205	Eddie Foster	Wide receiver	Houston	
9	232	Bill Currier	Safety	South Carolina	
10	262	Harvey Hull	Linebacker	Mississippi State	
11	289	Al Romano	Linebacker	Pittsburgh	
12	316	Ove Johansson	Kicker	Abilene Christian	
Made roster * Made at least one Pro Bowl during career

=== Undrafted free agents ===
1977 undrafted free agents of note
Player	Position	College
Horace Belton	Running back	Southeastern Louisiana

== Roster ==
1977 Houston Oilers roster
Quarterbacks (QB): 11 Tommy Duniven; 21 John Hadl; 7 Dan Pastorini; Running backs (RB): 26 Rob Carpenter; 47 Ronnie Coleman; 30 Don Hardeman; 31 Mike Voight; 45 Tim Wilson; Wide receivers (WR): 00 Ken Burrough; 89 Eddie Foster; 82 Gary Garrison; 84 Billy Johnson; Tight ends (TE): 86 Mike Barber; 88 Jimmie Giles	Offensive linemen (OL): 58 David Carter C; 75 Elbert Drungo G; 60 Ed Fisher G; 70 Conway Hayman T; 72 Kevin Hunt T; 55 Carl Mauck C; 64 George Reihner G; 73 Greg Sampson T; Defensive linemen (DL): 63 Steve Baumgartner DE; 78 Curley Culp NT; 69 Andy Dorris DE; 71 Ken Kennard NT; 74 Ernie Kirk DE; 77 James Young DE	Linebackers (LB): 54 Gregg Bingham ILB; 52 Robert Brazile OLB; 57 Steve Kiner OLB; 53 Art Stringer ILB; 51 Ted Thompson OLB; 59 Ted Washington OLB; Defensive backs (DB): 19 Willie Alexander CB; 20 Bill Currier SS; 15 Al Johnson FS; 25 Kurt Knoff SS; 22 Zeke Moore CB; 37 Mike Reinfeldt FS; 29 Rich Sowells CB; 27 Greg Stemrick CB; Special teams (ST): 23 Tom Dempsey K; 16 Toni Fritsch K; 18 Cliff Parsley P	Reserve: 83 Warren Anderson WR (IR); 65 Elvin Bethea DE (IR); 67 Jimmy Dean DE (IR); 66 Ted Hand C (IR); 40 John Housman RB (IR); -- Harvey Hull LB (IR); -- Ernest Knox DE (IR); 74 Bobby Simon G (IR); 76 Morris Towns T (IR); 28 Mike Weger S (IR); 38 C. L. Whittington S (IR); 44 Fred Willis RB (IR); 24 Gary Woolford CB (IR); Rookies in italics

== Schedule ==
Week	Date	Opponent	Result	Record	Venue	Attendance
1	September 18	New York Jets	**W** 20–0	1–0	Astrodome	39,488
2	September 25	at Green Bay Packers	**W** 16–10	2–0	Lambeau Field	55,071
3	October 2	at Miami Dolphins	**L** 7–27	2–1	Miami Orange Bowl	49,619
4	October 9	**Pittsburgh Steelers**	**W** 27–10	3–1	Astrodome	49,226
5	October 16	**Cleveland Browns**	**L** 23–24	3–2	Astrodome	47,888
6	October 23	at **Pittsburgh Steelers**	**L** 10–27	3–3	Three Rivers Stadium	48,517
7	October 30	at **Cincinnati Bengals**	**L** 10–13	3–4	Riverfront Stadium	53,194
8	November 6	Chicago Bears	**W** 47–0	4–4	Astrodome	47,226
9	November 13	at Oakland Raiders	**L** 29–34	4–5	Oakland–Alameda County Coliseum	53,667
10	November 20	at Seattle Seahawks	**W** 22–10	5–5	Kingdome	61,519
11	November 27	Kansas City Chiefs	**W** 34–20	6–5	Astrodome	42,934
12	December 4	Denver Broncos	**L** 14–24	6–6	Astrodome	46,875
13	December 11	at **Cleveland Browns**	**W** 19–15	7–6	Cleveland Municipal Stadium	30,898
14	December 18	**Cincinnati Bengals**	**W** 21–16	8–6	Astrodome	46,212
Note: Intra-division opponents are in **bold** text.

=== Standings ===
AFC Central
	W	L	T	PCT	DIV	CONF	PF	PA	STK
^{(3)} Pittsburgh Steelers	9	5	0	.643	4–2	7–5	283	243	W1
Houston Oilers	8	6	0	.571	3–3	6–6	299	230	W2
Cincinnati Bengals	8	6	0	.571	3–3	6–5	238	235	L1
Cleveland Browns	6	8	0	.429	2–4	5–7	269	267	L4
