= 1976 Houston Oilers season =

NFL team season

- Owner: Bud Adams
- General manager: Bum Phillips
- Head coach: Bum Phillips
- Home stadium: Houston Astrodome

Results
- Record: 5–9
- Division place: 4th AFC Central
- Playoffs: Did not qualify
- All-Pros: LB Robert Brazile (1st team)
- Pro Bowlers: WR Ken Burrough; PR/KR Billy "White Shoes" Johnson; DT Curley Culp; LB Robert Brazile

The 1976 Houston Oilers season was the 17th season overall and seventh with the National Football League (NFL). The team started the season 4–1 with their only loss coming by a single point to the eventual Super Bowl champion Oakland Raiders. They won only one more game, finishing the year 5–9, while failing to qualify for the playoffs for the seventh consecutive season.

== Offseason ==
=== NFL draft ===
1976 Houston Oilers draft
Round	Pick	Player	Position	College	Notes
2	48	Mike Barber	Tight end	Louisiana Tech	
4	117	Steve Largent * ^{†}	Wide receiver	Tulsa	
6	173	Todd Simonsen	Offensive tackle	South Dakota State	
7	197	Larry Harris	Defensive tackle	Oklahoma State	
8	229	Bobby Simon	Offensive tackle	Grambling	
9	256	Art Stringer	Linebacker	Ball State	
10	284	Steve Kincannon	Quarterback	Humboldt State	
11	311	Skip Walker	Running back	Texas A&M	
12	324	Larry Bell	Offensive tackle	East Texas State	
13	369	Dan O‘Rourke	Wide receiver	Colorado State	
14	395	John Reimer	Offensive tackle	Wisconsin	
15	422	Bobby Byars	Defensive back	Cheyney (PA)	
16	453	Claude Johnson	Linebacker	Florida A&M	
17	479	Allen Misher	Wide receiver	LSU	
Made roster † Pro Football Hall of Fame * Made at least one Pro Bowl during career

== Roster ==
1976 Houston Oilers roster
Quarterbacks (QB): 13 Jim Foote; 21 John Hadl; 7 Dan Pastorini P; Running backs (RB): 47 Ronnie Coleman; 33 Joe Dawkins; 30 Don Hardeman; 15 Al Johnson; 42 Altie Taylor; 44 Fred Willis; Wide receivers (WR): 00 Ken Burrough; 84 Billy Johnson; 89 Earl Thomas; Tight ends (TE): 82 Mack Alston; 87 Al Darby; 81 John Sawyer	Offensive linemen (OL): 75 Elbert Drungo T; 60 Ed Fisher G; 70 Conway Hayman G; 56 Dennis Havig G; 72 Kevin Hunt T; 53 Ron Lou C; 55 Carl Mauck C; 73 Greg Sampson T; Defensive linemen (DL): 65 Elvin Bethea DE; 68 Al Burton DE; 78 Curley Culp NT; 80 John Little NT; 71 Joe Owens DE	Linebackers (LB): 50 Duane Benson OLB; 54 Gregg Bingham ILB; 52 Robert Brazile OLB; 57 Steve Kiner ILB; 58 Tim Rossovich ILB; 51 Ted Thompson ILB; 59 Ted Washington OLB; Defensive backs (DB): 48 Bob Atkins FS; 22 Zeke Moore CB; 37 Mike Reinfeldt SS; 27 Greg Stemrick CB; 38 C. L. Whittington FS; 49 Sam Williams CB; Special teams (ST): 2 Skip Butler K; 14 Leroy Clark P	Reserve: 19 Willie Alexander CB (IR); 86 Mike Barber TE (IR); 88 Jim Beirne WR (IR); 61 Larry Harris DT (IR); 74 Bobby Simon T (IR); 77 Bubba Smith DE (IR); 39 Art Stringer LB (IR); 28 Mike Weger S (IR); Rookies in italics

== Schedule ==
Week	Date	Opponent	Result	Record	Venue	Attendance
1	September 12	Tampa Bay Buccaneers	**W** 20–0	1–0	Astrodome	42,228
2	September 19	at Buffalo Bills	**W** 13–3	2–0	Rich Stadium	61,364
3	September 26	Oakland Raiders	**L** 13–14	2–1	Astrodome	42,338
4	October 3	at New Orleans Saints	**W** 31–26	3–1	Louisiana Superdome	51,973
5	October 10	Denver Broncos	**W** 17–3	4–1	Astrodome	45,928
6	October 17	at San Diego Chargers	**L** 27–30	4–2	San Diego Stadium	31,565
7	October 24	**Cincinnati Bengals**	**L** 7–27	4–3	Astrodome	45,499
8	November 1	at Baltimore Colts	**L** 14–38	4–4	Memorial Stadium	60,020
9	November 7	**Cleveland Browns**	**L** 7–21	4–5	Astrodome	39,828
10	November 14	at **Cincinnati Bengals**	**L** 27–31	4–6	Riverfront Stadium	53,243
11	November 21	at **Pittsburgh Steelers**	**L** 16–32	4–7	Three Rivers Stadium	47,947
12	November 28	Atlanta Falcons	**W** 20–14	5–7	Astrodome	25,838
13	December 5	at **Cleveland Browns**	**L** 10–13	5–8	Cleveland Municipal Stadium	56,025
14	December 11	**Pittsburgh Steelers**	**L** 0–21	5–9	Astrodome	44,743
Note: Intra-division opponents are in **bold** text.

== Standings ==
AFC Central
	W	L	T	PCT	DIV	CONF	PF	PA	STK
Pittsburgh Steelers^{(3)}	10	4	0	.714	5–1	9–3	342	138	W9
Cincinnati Bengals	10	4	0	.714	4–2	8–4	335	210	W1
Cleveland Browns	9	5	0	.643	3–3	7–5	267	287	L1
Houston Oilers	5	9	0	.357	0–6	3–9	222	273	L2
