= 1975 Houston Oilers season =

NFL team season

- Owner: Bud Adams
- General manager: Bum Phillips
- Head coach: Bum Phillips
- Home stadium: Houston Astrodome

Results
- Record: 10–4
- Division place: 3rd AFC Central
- Playoffs: Did not qualify
- All-Pros: DT Curley Culp (1st team); RS Billy "White Shoes" Johnson (1st team); DE Elvin Bethea (2nd team)
- Pro Bowlers: WR Ken Burrough; QB Dan Pastorini; DT Curley Culp; DE Elvin Bethea; RS Billy "White Shoes" Johnson

The 1975 Houston Oilers season was the team's 16th year and sixth in the National Football League.

In Bum Phillips' first season as Coach, the Oilers played competitive football, posting their first winning season in eight years with a 10–4 record. All four losses were to the Pittsburgh Steelers and Cincinnati Bengals, who beat out the Oilers for the Division Title and Wild Card spot, respectively; the Oilers did not make the playoffs for the sixth consecutive season. During week 13, the Oilers defeated the Oakland Raiders, who posted an 11–3 record and advanced to the AFC Championship game. During the season, the Oilers also defeated Washington and Miami, each team with a winning record.

Had a second wild card been available (it was not until 1978), the Oilers would have clinched it thanks to their win vs. the Dolphins (both Houston and Miami finished 10-4).

It was a three-win improvement over their previous season, the Oilers' first winning season since 1967, and the franchise's best record since 1962.

== Offseason ==
=== NFL draft ===
1975 Houston Oilers draft
Round	Pick	Player	Position	College	Notes
1	6	Robert Brazile * ^{†}	Linebacker	Jackson State	
1	15	Don Hardeman	Running back	Texas A&I	
2	40	Emmett Edwards	Wide receiver	Kansas	
6	146	Jesse O‘Neill	Defensive end	Grambling State	
7	162	Mike Biehle	Offensive tackle	Miami (OH)	
7	171	Mark Cotney	Safety	Cameron	
8	196	Jerry Lawrence	Defensive tackle	South Dakota State	
9	221	Bob Bruer	Tight end	Mankato State	
10	246	Alan Pringle	Kicker	Rice	
11	271	John Sawyer	Tight end	Southern Mississippi	
12	302	Willie Miller	Wide receiver	Colorado State	
13	327	Ricky Scales	Wide receiver	Virginia Tech	
14	352	Jody Medford	Guard	Rice	
15	377	Jack Holmes	Running back	Texas Southern	
16	402	Ken Lambert	Defensive back	Virginia Tech	
17	427	Ricky Seeker	Center	Texas A&M	
Made roster † Pro Football Hall of Fame * Made at least one Pro Bowl during career

== Roster ==
Houston Oilers roster
Quarterbacks: 10 Lynn Dickey; 7 Dan Pastorini P; Running backs: 47 Ronnie Coleman; 30 Don Hardeman; 36 Robert Holmes; 24 Willie Rodgers; 44 Fred Willis; Wide receivers: 88 Jim Beirne; 00 Ken Burrough; 87 Emmett Edwards; 86 Nate Hawkins; 84 Billy Johnson; Tight ends: 82 Mack Alston; 83 Willie Frazier	Offensive linemen: 75 Elbert Drungo T; 60 Ed Fisher G; 70 Conway Hayman G; 53 Fred Hoaglin C; 72 Kevin Hunt T; 55 Carl Mauck C; 73 Greg Sampson T; 64 Ron Saul G; Defensive linemen: 65 Elvin Bethea DE; 78 Curley Culp NT; 80 John Little NT; 77 Bubba Smith DE; 85 Tody Smith DE; 79 Jim White DE	Linebackers: 54 Gregg Bingham ILB; 52 Robert Brazile OLB; 57 Steve Kiner ILB; 56 Guy Roberts OLB; 51 Ted Thompson ILB; 59 Ted Washington OLB; Defensive backs: 19 Willie Alexander CB; 48 Bob Atkins FS; 33 Mark Cotney SS; 22 Zeke Moore CB; 29 Willie Germany SS; 27 Greg Stemrick CB; 38 C. L. Whittington FS; Special teams: 2 Skip Butler K	Reserve lists: 52 Duane Benson LB (IR); 63 Ronnie Carroll G (IR); 15 Al Johnson S (IR); 24 Mike Montgomery WR (IR); -- Oliver Nicholson LB (IR); 20 Billy Parks WR (IR); 81 John Sawyer TE (IR); -- Lee Thomas DE (IR); rookies in italics

== Regular season ==
The team achieved a winning record with ten wins and four losses, but finished only third in the division and missed the playoffs for the sixth consecutive season.

=== Schedule ===
Week	Date	Opponent	Result	Record	Venue	Attendance
1	September 21	at New England Patriots	**W** 7–0	1–0	Schaefer Stadium	51,934
2	September 28	San Diego Chargers	**W** 33–17	2–0	Astrodome	33,765
3	October 5	**Cincinnati Bengals**	**L** 19–21	2–1	Astrodome	42,412
4	October 12	at **Cleveland Browns**	**W** 40–10	3–1	Cleveland Municipal Stadium	46,531
5	October 19	Washington Redskins	**W** 13–10	4–1	Astrodome	49,566
6	October 26	Detroit Lions	**W** 24–8	5–1	Astrodome	46,904
7	November 2	at Kansas City Chiefs	**W** 17–13	6–1	Arrowhead Stadium	62,989
8	November 9	at **Pittsburgh Steelers**	**L** 17–24	6–2	Three Rivers Stadium	49,460
9	November 16	Miami Dolphins	**W** 20–19	7–2	Astrodome	48,892
10	November 24	**Pittsburgh Steelers**	**L** 9–32	7–3	Astrodome	49,947
11	November 30	at **Cincinnati Bengals**	**L** 19–23	7–4	Riverfront Stadium	46,128
12	December 7	at San Francisco 49ers	**W** 27–13	8–4	Candlestick Park	44,015
13	December 14	at Oakland Raiders	**W** 27–26	9–4	Oakland–Alameda County Coliseum	50,719
14	December 21	**Cleveland Browns**	**W** 21–10	10–4	Astrodome	43,770
Note: Intra-division opponents are in **bold** text.

=== Standings ===
AFC Central
	W	L	T	PCT	DIV	CONF	PF	PA	STK
Pittsburgh Steelers^{(1)}	12	2	0	.857	6–0	10–1	373	162	L1
Cincinnati Bengals^{(4)}	11	3	0	.786	3–3	8–3	340	246	W1
Houston Oilers	10	4	0	.714	2–4	7–4	293	226	W3
Cleveland Browns	3	11	0	.214	1–5	2–8	218	372	L1

== Milestones ==
When they defeated the Redskins in Week 5, the Oilers became the last AFL team to finally win a game against the NFC, since the AFL/NFL merger in 1970 (although the OIlers defeated former NFL teams Baltimore, Cleveland and Pittsburgh, all of whom moved to the AFC as part of the merger, prior to 1975). Houston was 0-11-1 vs. the NFC from 1970-74, with the tie vs. New Orleans in 1971.
