= Jeff Groth =

Jeff Groth may refer to:

- Jeff Groth (American football) (born 1957), former American football wide receiver
- Jeff Groth (film editor), film and television editor
