= Arthur Stringer =

Arthur Stringer may refer to:

- Arthur Stringer (writer) (1874-1950), Canadian writer
- Art Stringer (born 1954), American football player
