= Scott Myers =

American painter and sculptor (born 1958)

- Born: 1958 (age 67–68)
- Education: Texas A&M University
- Elected: National Sculpture Society
- Website: http://www.scottmyersstudio.com

Scott Myers (born 1958) is an American painter and sculptor who lives and works in Texas. He graduated from Texas A&M University in 1984 with a doctorate in veterinary medicine. He studied sculpture throughout Italy focusing on Florence, Venice and Rome. Sculpting in Tuscany, he cast his work in bronze at the prestigious Fonderia d'Arte Massimo Del Chiaro in Pietrasanta. In 1994, Myers became an elected member of the National Sculpture Society. Myers was inducted in the inaugural class of the Haltom City High School Hall of Fame on March 10, 2011.

Myers has sculpted busts for the Pro Football Hall of Fame, including Adam Vinatieri, Chris Doleman, Chris Hanburger, Rickey Jackson, Russ Grimm, Bob Hayes, Randall McDaniel, Fred Dean, Emmitt Thomas, Bruce Matthews, Rayfield Wright, Elvin Bethea, Curley Culp, Claude Humphrey, Drew Pearson, Johnny Robinson, Cliff Harris, Bobby Dillon, Robert Brazile, Gil Brandt, Bobby Beathard, Kenny Easley, LaDainian Tomlinson, Charles Haley, Chuck Howley, Bryant Young, Andre Johnson, and Kevin Greene.

Myers' paintings focus mostly on ranch life and western landscapes, with horses and cowboys figuring prominently in his subject matter. His paintings combine bold color with a Monet-like layering of color and texture that makes him unique in the western art genre.

== Selected museum collections ==
Pro Football Hall of Fame – Canton, Ohio

Museo dei Bozzetti – Pietrasanta, Italy

Bosque Conservatory of Fine Arts – Clifton, Texas

Nita Stewart Haley Memorial Library & J. Evetts Haley History Center-Midland, Texas

== Selected exhibitions ==
Panhandle-Plains Invitational Western Art Show – Panhandle-Plains Historical Museum – Canyon, Texas 2005, 2006, 2007, 2008

Mountain Oyster Club Annual Contemporary Western Art Show – Tucson, Arizona 2004, 2005, 2006

“Memories in Bronze", one-man exhibition, Clyde H. Wells Fine Arts Center Gallery, Tarleton State University – Stephenville, Texas

“Gallery Night Under the Stars", Schaefer Art Bronze Foundry – Arlington, Texas

One-man Sculpture Exhibition, Soderberg/Stevenson Sculpture Gallery – Sedona, Arizona

== Selected awards ==
Voted "Best of the Hall of Fame" by Sports Illustrated for the bust of Bruce Matthews in the Pro Football Hall of Fame

Conservatory Art Patrons Purchase Award and silver medal for oil painting- For oil painting "Tanner's Pride" at the 2005 Conservatory Art Classic, Clifton, Texas

Joyce and Eliot Liskin Foundation Award – 1994 Young Sculptors Award sponsored by National Sculpture Society, New York

First place Sculpture Award – For sculpture "Cuttin’ Loose" at 1995 "Strokes of Genius", SAS Competition, Scottsdale, Arizona

James Boren Artist's Choice Award for sculpture "Serenity" at 1993 8th Annual Bosque Conservatory of Fine Arts Competition
