= Mike Barber (tight end) =

American football player (born 1953)

No. 86, 85
- Position: Tight end

Personal information
- Born: June 4, 1953 (age 73); White Oak, Texas, U.S.
- Listed height: 6 ft 3 in (1.91 m)
- Listed weight: 235 lb (107 kg)

Career information
- High school: White Oak
- College: Louisiana Tech
- NFL draft: 1976: 2nd round, 48th overall pick

Career history
- Houston Oilers (1976–1981); Los Angeles Rams (1982–1985); Denver Broncos (1985)

Awards and highlights
- Louisiana Tech Athletic Hall of Fame (1995)

Career NFL statistics
- Receptions: 222
- Receiving yards: 2,788
- Receiving touchdowns: 17
- Stats at Pro Football Reference

Michael Dwayne Barber (born June 4, 1953) is an American former professional football player who was a tight end in the National Football League (NFL). He played college football for the Louisiana Tech Bulldogs

== Early life and education ==
Barber attended White Oak High School, where he played quarterback, passing for over 4,000 yards, and graduated in 1972. He then attended Louisiana Tech where he was converted to tight end. He was voted a 1974 Little All-American, as was Bulldog teammate and future Pro Football Hall of Fame defensive end Fred Dean.

He was selected in the second round of 1976 NFL draft by the Houston Oilers with the 48th overall pick. He played for the Oilers for six years, and then finished his career playing four years for the Los Angeles Rams. He then retired to work in ministry.

== Career ==
=== High school coaching ===
During the mid-1990s, Mike returned to football, when he took a voluntary coaching position at Trinity Christian School in Cedar Hill, Texas. He coached for two years with Trinity, and then left amid a minor dispute to join Arlington's Grace Prep Academy, where he coached or was involved with coaching between 1998 and 2005.

Grace Prep was successful while Barber was the coach (in various guises, including head coach); during his eight-year tenure there, the team had a winning record every season, and won the State Championship in their division five of those years. However, he was suspended for a year in 2001, and was fired from the Head coaching position in May 2006 after a dispute with school administrators. He has since focused his efforts on his ministry.

== Controversy ==
While associated with the Grace Prep football program, Barber was given "one of the sternest sanctions ever administered" by the Texas Association of Private and Parochial Schools. According to TAPPS, he had offered athletes "improper inducements". He was suspended from coaching for a year, and the school's program placed on three years' probation. Barber denied all accusations and maintains that he did nothing improper.

Because several prominent players transferred to Grace Prep along with Barber (for some of whom he was accused of improperly paying tuition, a claim he denies), TAPPS instituted what is informally known as "The Mike Barber Rule": players who follow a coach to another school are ineligible from playing for a year.

In July 2006, the Dallas Morning News published an article titled "Barber Prison Ministry Spreads The Word -- And The Wealth", discussing in detail Barber and his various relatives' notably high incomes from his non-profit organization. According to The News:

Two years ago, the high-profile charity paid its founder $236,500 in salary and benefits, one of the highest pay packages in the nation among similar religious charities. His wife, who worked part time, received $118,000. The ministry also pays three other members of Mr. Barber's family.

Also, "[a]mong officers at about 4,000 groups that filed returns, Mr. Barber's 2003 pay package ranked 13th highest..." and they note that the average pay was "about $97,000".

In his only quoted response in the article, Barber defends himself simply:

I give so much of that away," Mr. Barber said of his pay. "If somebody wants to judge me for that [salary], go for it.

Barber Prison ministries continues to spread the word to prison inmates.

== NFL career statistics ==
Legend
**Bold**	Career high

=== Regular season ===
Year	Team	Games		Receiving				
Year	Team	GP	GS	Rec	Yds	Avg	Lng	TD
1976	HOU	2	0	0	0	0.0	0	0
1977	HOU	13	10	9	94	10.4	23	1
1978	HOU	**16**	**16**	32	513	16.0	72	3
1979	HOU	15	15	27	377	14.0	37	3
1980	HOU	**16**	**16**	**59**	**712**	12.1	**79**	**5**
1981	HOU	**16**	5	13	190	14.6	35	1
1982	RAM	9	9	18	166	9.2	21	1
1983	RAM	**16**	**16**	55	657	11.9	42	3
1984	RAM	11	2	7	42	6.0	11	0
1985	RAM	10	1	1	8	8.0	8	0
1985	DEN	5	5	1	29	**29.0**	29	0
		129	95	222	2,788	12.6	79	17

=== Playoffs ===
Year	Team	Games		Receiving				
Year	Team	GP	GS	Rec	Yds	Avg	Lng	TD
1978	HOU	**3**	**3**	**9**	**195**	**21.7**	**55**	**2**
1979	HOU	**3**	**3**	3	51	17.0	31	0
1980	HOU	1	1	4	83	20.8	33	0
1983	RAM	2	2	5	62	12.4	18	0
1984	RAM	1	0	3	31	10.3	16	0
		10	9	24	422	17.6	55	2
