= Vernon Perry =

American gridiron football player (born 1953)

No. 32
- Position: Safety

Personal information
- Born: September 22, 1953 (age 73); Jackson, Mississippi, U.S.
- Listed height: 6 ft 2 in (1.88 m)
- Listed weight: 211 lb (96 kg)

Career information
- High school: Wingfield
- College: Jackson State
- NFL draft: 1976: undrafted

Career history
- Chicago Bears (1976)*; Montreal Alouettes (1977–1978); Houston Oilers (1979–1982); New Orleans Saints (1983)
- * Offseason or practice squad member only

Awards and highlights
- Grey Cup champion (1977); PFWA All-Rookie Team (1979)

Career NFL statistics
- Interceptions: 11
- Fumble recoveries: 3
- Total touchdowns: 1
- Stats at Pro Football Reference

Vernon Perry Jr. (born September 22, 1953) is an American former professional football player who was a safety for five seasons. He played for the Montreal Alouettes of the Canadian Football League (CFL), the Houston Oilers and New Orleans Saints of the National Football League.

== College career ==
Born in Jackson, Mississippi, Perry played at Wingfield High School before being recruited to play Jackson State University. He was teammates with future members of the Pro Football Hall of Fame Robert Brazile and Walter Payton.

== Pro career ==
Perry was undrafted due to perceptions of being undersized for a linebacker at 6' 2" and 211 LBs so he played strong safety which is not undersized for a strong safety even today*. The Chicago Bears signed him as a free agent but cut him in preseason. He would impress scouts for the Montreal Alouettes of the Canadian Football League. He recorded nine interceptions in 1977. His college teammate Brazile convinced Bum Phillips to sign Perry to play strong safety for the Houston Oilers. Perry's most notable NFL accomplishment came as a 26-year-old NFL rookie in 1979. The team made the postseason and were tasked to play the San Diego Chargers in the Divisional Round but quarterback Dan Pastorini, running back Earl Campbell and receiver Ken Burrough were all out due to injury. In the game on December 29, 1979, Perry blocked a field goal and returned it 57 yards before being tackled by the holder and set an NFL postseason record by intercepting four passes from Chargers quarterback Dan Fouts, a mark that still stands. In the following playoff game, the AFC Championship, against Pittsburgh, Perry intercepted a Terry Bradshaw pass and returned it 75 yards for a touchdown on Pittsburgh's first possession of the game.

Ultimately, Perry recorded 11 interceptions with three fumble recoveries in his NFL career.

After his NFL career ended, he became a teacher, doing so in Houston and his alma mater Wingfield High until he retired in 2018. In 2010, he was inspired to give back to his hometown, which led to him starting his own charity organization with the Save A Kid 2 Save A Life Foundation. Each year, with the help of local businesses that see bikes and toys donated to needy families in Jackson each year. Later on, he committed time and the help of Brazile of a giveaway of hundreds of autographed NFL jerseys after noticing the lack of jerseys worn of people born in Mississippi. Perry also served as president of the Mississippi Retired NFL Players Association.
