= Robert Brazile =

American football player (born 1953)

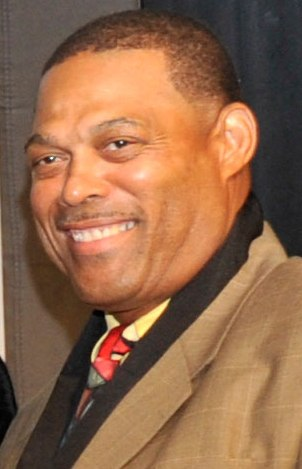
- Brazile in 2010

No. 52
- Position: Linebacker

Personal information
- Born: February 7, 1953 (age 73); Mobile, Alabama, U.S.
- Listed height: 6 ft 4 in (1.93 m)
- Listed weight: 241 lb (109 kg)

Career information
- High school: Vigor (Prichard, Alabama)
- College: Jackson State (1971–1974)
- NFL draft: 1975: 1st round, 6th overall pick

Career history
- Houston Oilers (1975–1984)

Awards and highlights
- NFL Defensive Rookie of the Year (1975); 2× First-team All-Pro (1978, 1979); 4× Second-team All-Pro (1976, 1977, 1980, 1981); 7× Pro Bowl (1976–1982); NFL 1970s All-Decade Team; PFWA All-Rookie Team (1975); Titans/Oilers Ring of Honor; First-team Little All-American (1974); First-team All-SWAC (1974)

Career NFL statistics
- Total tackles: 1,281
- Sacks: 48
- Fumble recoveries: 14
- Interceptions: 13
- Interception yards: 201
- Stats at Pro Football Reference
- Pro Football Hall of Fame

Robert Lorenzo Brazile Jr. (born February 7, 1953), nicknamed "Dr. Doom", is an American former professional football player who was a linebacker in the National Football League (NFL). Brazile played from 1975 to 1984 for the Houston Oilers and was inducted into the Pro Football Hall of Fame in 2018.

== Professional career ==
Brazile was taken with the sixth overall pick of the first round of the 1975 NFL draft. It was part of the bounty Sid Gillman acquired along with Curley Culp when he traded John Matuszak to the Kansas City Chiefs. However, it would be new head coach/general manager Bum Phillips who made the selection.

Phillips' arrival in Houston also brought a change in the base defense the Oilers ran, switching from a 4-3 to a 3-4. The 3–4 would prove to be a perfect fit for Brazile's combination of size (6'4", 230 lbs) and great speed. While most cite Lawrence Taylor as the prototype of the pass-rushing outside linebacker in the NFL, there are some, including Phillips, who say Brazile was the one who first made the 3–4 popular for sending an outside linebacker to rush the quarterback. Brazile also performed well in pass coverage and against the run, consistently ranking at or near the top for the team lead in tackles even though opponents often avoided his side of the field.

Brazile found immediate success with the Oilers, winning the NFL's Defensive Rookie of the Year award for the 1975 season. He was named to the Pro Bowl seven straight seasons, was All-Pro five straight seasons (1976–80), and was selected to the NFL's All-Decade Team for the 1970s. In 1978 and 1979, Brazile was a key member of Oilers teams that went to back-to-back AFC Championship Games.

After a third straight postseason loss in 1980, Phillips was fired by Oilers owner Bud Adams and the team entered a period of steep decline. The constant losing wore on Brazile and caused him to contemplate retiring. However, he has said it was the death of his first wife, Cookie, in a car wreck in Houston in 1984, that made the decision for him.

Officially, Brazile finished his career with 11 quarterback sacks. Unofficially, his career sack total is 48 (sacks did not become an official NFL statistic until 1982). He is also credited with 1,281 tackles, the second highest total in Houston Oilers / Tennessee Titans history.

On August 24, 2017, Brazile and former Green Bay Packers guard Jerry Kramer were named as seniors committee finalists for the Pro Football Hall of Fame Class of 2018. He was announced as member of the class of 2018 on February 3, 2018. Robert Brazile was inducted into the Pro Football Hall of Fame on Saturday, August 4, 2018, and his bust was sculpted by Scott Myers.

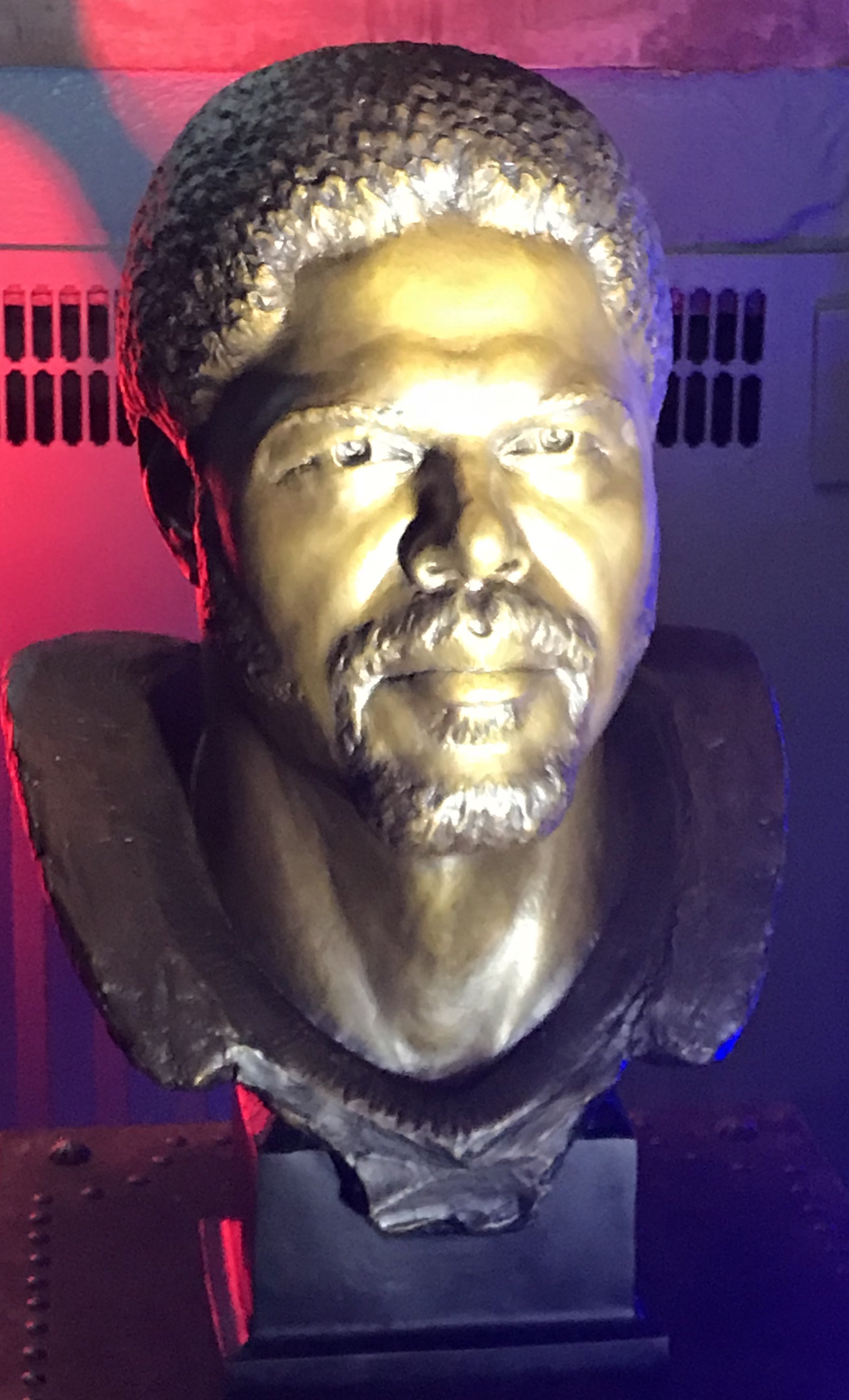
Bronze bust of Robert Brazile, enshrined at the Pro Football Hall of Fame, Canton Ohio, USA, 2018

On October 14, 2018, Brazile was inducted to the Titans-Oilers Ring of Honor.

== NFL career statistics ==
Legend
**Bold**	Career high

=== Regular season ===
Year	Team	Games		Sck	Interceptions					Fumbles			
Year	Team	GP	GS	Sck	Int	Yds	Y/I	Lng	TD	FR	Yds	Y/F	TD
1975	HOU	14	14	**7.0**	0	0	—	0	0	**5**	**18**	**3.6**	0
1976	HOU	14	14	6.5	1	8	8.0	8	0	1	0	0.0	0
1977	HOU	14	14	5.0	**3**	40	13.3	16	0	0	0	—	0
1978	HOU	**16**	**16**	5.0	1	30	30.0	30	0	0	0	—	0
1979	HOU	**16**	**16**	5.0	2	**45**	22.5	26	0	3	0	0.0	0
1980	HOU	**16**	**16**	6.5	2	38	19.0	**33**	0	0	0	—	0
1981	HOU	**16**	**16**	2.0	2	7	3.5	7	0	0	0	—	0
1982	HOU	9	9	6.5	1	31	**31.0**	31	0	1	0	0.0	0
1983	HOU	**16**	**16**	2.5	0	0	—	0	0	3	0	0.0	0
1984	HOU	**16**	**16**	2.0	1	2	2.0	2	0	1	0	0.0	0
Career		147	147	48.0	13	201	15.5	33	0	14	18	1.3	0

=== Postseason ===
Year	Team	Games		Sck	Fumbles			
Year	Team	GP	GS	Sck	FR	Yds	Y/F	TD
1978	HOU	**3**	**3**	**1.0**	**1**	0	**0.0**	0
1979	HOU	**3**	**3**	0.0	0	0	—	0
1980	HOU	1	1	0.0	0	0	—	0
Career		7	7	1.0	1	0	0.0	0

== Post-football ==
After retiring from the NFL, Brazile, along with ex-Oiler teammate Ken Burrough, coached for a minor league pro team in Mobile, Alabama. After needing quadruple bypass heart surgery in 2004, Brazile gave up coaching and became a middle-school teacher for children with special needs in Mobile. He has also become an avid tennis player. When asked if his old "Dr. Doom" persona ever comes out on the tennis court, he's quoted as saying laughingly, "No more Dr. Doom," "Just Robert Brazile."

In 2007, Brazile was inducted into the Bancorp Mississippi Sports Hall of Fame.
