= Cliff Parsley =

American football player (born 1954)

No. 18
- Position: Punter

Personal information
- Born: December 26, 1954 (age 71); Kansas City, Missouri, U.S.
- Listed height: 6 ft 1 in (1.85 m)
- Listed weight: 211 lb (96 kg)

Career information
- College: Oklahoma State
- NFL draft: 1977: 6th round, 147th overall pick

Career history
- Houston Oilers (1977–1982)

Awards and highlights
- 2× First-team All-Big Eight (1975, 1976)

Career NFL statistics
- Punts: 431
- Punting yards: 17,136
- Punting avg: 39.8
- Stats at Pro Football Reference

Cliff Donald Parsley (born December 26, 1954) is a former punter for the National Football League (NFL). He played for the Houston Oilers from 1977 to 1982. He played college football at Oklahoma State and was selected to the Big 8 All-decade team for the 1970s.

== NFL career statistics ==
Legend
| **Bold** | Career high |

=== Regular season ===
| Year | Team | Punting | | | | | | | | | |
| Year | Team | GP | Punts | Yds | Net Yds | Lng | Avg | Net Avg | Blk | Ins20 | TB |
|---|---|---|---|---|---|---|---|---|---|---|---|
| 1977 | HOU | 14 | 77 | 3,030 | 2,510 | 55 | 39.4 | 31.8 | **2** | 14 | **9** |
| 1978 | HOU | **16** | 91 | 3,539 | 2,902 | 59 | 38.9 | 31.5 | 1 | **20** | 6 |
| 1979 | HOU | **16** | **93** | **3,777** | **2,951** | 59 | 40.6 | 31.7 | 0 | 14 | 5 |
| 1980 | HOU | **16** | 67 | 2,727 | 2,173 | 57 | **40.7** | 32.4 | 0 | **20** | 8 |
| 1981 | HOU | **16** | 79 | 3,137 | 2,717 | **62** | 39.7 | **34.4** | 0 | 17 | 3 |
| 1982 | HOU | 4 | 24 | 926 | 751 | 51 | 38.6 | 31.3 | 0 | 3 | 2 |
| Career | | 82 | 431 | 17,136 | 14,004 | 62 | 39.8 | 32.3 | 3 | 88 | 33 |

=== Playoffs ===
| Year | Team | Punting | | | | | | | | | |
| Year | Team | GP | Punts | Yds | Net Yds | Lng | Avg | Net Avg | Blk | Ins20 | TB |
|---|---|---|---|---|---|---|---|---|---|---|---|
| 1978 | HOU | **3** | **16** | **631** | 470 | 49 | 39.4 | 29.4 | 0 | 1 | **2** |
| 1979 | HOU | **3** | 15 | 580 | **518** | 50 | 38.7 | 34.5 | 0 | **6** | 0 |
| 1980 | HOU | 1 | 9 | 396 | 347 | **56** | **44.0** | **38.6** | 0 | 2 | 1 |
| Career | | 7 | 40 | 1,607 | 1,335 | 56 | 40.2 | 33.4 | 0 | 9 | 3 |
