= Howard Slusher =

American attorney and sports agent (1937–2022)

Howard Slusher (June 11, 1937 – July 13, 2022) was an American attorney and sports agent. He was known for his aggressive and relentless negotiation style.

== List of Howard Slusher clients ==
=== Basketball ===
- Mike Bratz
- Tom Chambers
- Danny Vranes
- Paul Westphal
- Gus Williams

=== American football ===
- Gary Barbaro
- Carl Barzilauskas
- Todd Bell
- Richard Bishop
- Tom Brahaney
- Roger Carr
- Sam Cunningham
- John Dutton
- Dan Fouts
- Gordon Gravelle
- Leon Gray
- John Hannah
- Mark Haynes
- Mike Haynes
- John Jefferson
- Crawford Ker
- Bruce Matthews
- Larry Moriarty
- Anthony Muñoz
- Eddie Murray
- Tom Owen
- Tom Skladany
- Jim Smith
- Jeris White
- Randy White
- Charle Young
