= Jeff Groth (American football) =

American football player (born 1957)

No. 85, 81, 48, 86
- Position: Wide receiver

Personal information
- Born: July 2, 1957 (age 69); Mankato, Minnesota, U.S.
- Listed height: 5 ft 10 in (1.78 m)
- Listed weight: 176 lb (80 kg)

Career information
- High school: Chagrin Falls (Chagrin Falls, Ohio)
- College: Bowling Green
- NFL draft: 1979: 8th round, 206th overall pick

Career history
- Miami Dolphins (1979); Houston Oilers (1979-1980); New Orleans Saints (1981–1985)

Career NFL statistics
- Receptions: 152
- Receiving yards: 2,126
- Receiving touchdowns: 5
- Stats at Pro Football Reference

Jeffrey Eugene Groth (born July 2, 1957) is an American former professional football player who was a wide receiver in the National Football League (NFL) for the Miami Dolphins, Houston Oilers, and the New Orleans Saints. Groth was also a 4th round selection of the Texas Rangers as an outfielder in the 1980 MLB draft.

Groth played college football for the Bowling Green Falcons. In 1978, he played collegiate summer baseball with the Chatham A's of the Cape Cod Baseball League, and was named a league all-star and team MVP.

== College career ==
Jeff Groth played his college football at Bowling Green State University. His freshman year, Groth was a duel threat player, getting experience at both running back and wide receiver. Bowling Green head Coach Don Nehlen was attempting to take advantage of Groth's speed and his athletic talents. The following season, he became the number receiver, and a favorite target of quarterback Mark Miller. 1976 saw Groth catch 33 passes for 598 yards and four touchdowns. Groth even threw a pass on a gimmick play, but it fell incomplete.

In Groth's junior season in 1977, there was a regime change at Bowling Green. Nehlen was out, replaced by Dennis Stolz, who'd been the head coach at Michigan State. Bowling Green struggled badly, falling to the lower tier of the Mid-American Conference. However, the teaming of Mark Miller and Groth was still the main offensive spark. Groth caught 39 passes for 693 yards, and six touchdowns.

1978 ended up being another losing season for Bowling Green. Quarterback Mark Miller had graduated and been drafted by the Cleveland Browns, leaving his longtime understudy Mike Wright to take the reins at quarterback. Jeff Groth again put up impressive numbers as Bowling Green's number one receiver. This time, he caught 56 passes for 874 yards and eight touchdown passes. Jeff Groth finished his college career with 136 receptions for 2,268 yards and eighteen touchdown receptions. To date Groth is 12th all-time in receiving for Bowling Green.

== Professional career ==
With the 206th pick in the 1979 NFL draft, Jeff Groth was selected by the Miami Dolphins. In his rookie season, Groth languished on the bench. Miami had deep depth at receivers, with Nat Moore, Duriel Harris and Jimmy Cefalo ahead of him on the depth chart. After sitting on the bench in Miami, Groth finally saw action in an NFL game. Groth had been claimed in waivers by the Houston Oilers. It was with Houston that he'd see his only action, catching one pass for six yards, and returning a punt for 27 yards.

Groth saw more action the following season. Houston had acquired Ken Stabler from Oakland in an attempt to improve their already high octane offense. Yet again, Groth found himself on the wrong end of a deep depth chart. Groth struggled to get playing time behind the likes of Ken Burrough, Billy "White Shoes" Johnson, and Mike Renfro. Groth finished his second NFL season with four receptions for 47 yards.

At the end of the season, Houston decided to make many changes. Bum Phillips was fired, and Groth was one of many players traded or outright released at the end of the season. Groth had been released after the last game of the preseason. Phillips landed on his feet with the New Orleans Saints, hoping to turn around a franchise that at the time, was the only team in the NFL that had never appeared in a play off game.

New Orleans helped breathe new life in Groth's career. He supplanted Ike Harris in the starting line-up, pairing with Wes Chandler, at the time one of the best deep threats in the NFL. Groth finished with twenty receptions for 380 yards and one touchdown. Groth's first professional score came on a 24-yard pass from quarterback Dave Wilson in a 21-14 loss to the San Francisco 49ers.

The Saints finished 4-12 in 1981. The next year, the strike shortened 1982 season, Groth caught thirty passes for 383 yards and a touchdown pass. The Saints finished 4-5, and Groth played with an ever changing cast as quarterback. Archie Manning started the season, but he was traded to Houston for Ken Stabler. Guido Merkens, who the previous season had been the leading receiver, was converted to quarterback. With Wes Chandler gone to the San Diego Chargers, Groth was the only receiver left on the Saints roster with much experience. Groth's lone touchdown came from Ken Stabler in a 27-17 win over the Kansas City Chiefs.

In 1983, Groth played on a Saints team that finished 8-8, the first .500 finish in franchise history. And again, Groth led the team in receiving. In 14 games, Groth caught 49 passes for 585 yards and one touchdown. 1984 would see another change for the Saints. Ken Stabler retired and the Saints hoped to get over the hurdle by acquiring Richard Todd from the New York Jets. The Saints took a step back, finishing at 7-9. While Groth had an impressive season, Tyrone Young, a taller, lankier receiver, became Todd's number one target. Groth finished the season with 33 receptions and 487 yards.

1985 would be Groth's final season the in NFL. The Richard Todd experiment failed, costing Bum Phillips his job, as he was replaced by his son, Wade Phillips. And for the fourth time in four seasons, Groth found himself catching passes from yet another quarterback. With Todd reduced to third string, Groth caught passes from Dave Wilson, a career back-up, and Bobby Herbert, who the Saints acquired from the Oakland Invaders when the USFL folded.

1984 did see Jeff Groth receive a special honor. That year, Groth was inducted into the Bowling Green sports hall of fame. When his football career was over, Jeff Groth had caught 152 passes for 2,126 yards and five touchdowns. Ken Stabler, had likened Groth to hall of fame receiver Fred Biletnikoff, but only faster.
