= Conrad Rucker =

American football player (born 1954)

No. 87, 80, 63
- Position: Tight end

Personal information
- Born: November 15, 1954 (age 71); Cincinnati, Ohio, U.S.
- Listed height: 6 ft 3 in (1.91 m)
- Listed weight: 255 lb (116 kg)

Career information
- High school: Withrow (Cincinnati)
- College: Southern
- NFL draft: 1978: 6th round, 154th overall pick

Career history
- Houston Oilers (1978–1979); Tampa Bay Buccaneers (1980); Los Angeles Rams (1980)

Career NFL statistics
- Receptions: 6
- Receiving Yards: 78
- Stats at Pro Football Reference

Conrad Robert Rucker (born November 15, 1954) is an American former professional football player who was a tight end in the National Football League (NFL). He played college football for the Southern Jaguars. Rucker played in the NFL for the Houston Oilers from 1978 to 1979 and for the Tampa Bay Buccaneers and Los Angeles Rams in 1980.
