= Rich Ellender =

American football player (born 1957)

No. 85
- Positions: Wide receiver, return specialist

Personal information
- Born: June 9, 1957 (age 69); Sulphur, Louisiana, U.S.
- Listed height: 5 ft 10 in (1.78 m)
- Listed weight: 165 lb (75 kg)

Career information
- High school: Sulphur
- College: McNeese State
- NFL draft: 1979: 9th round, 243rd overall pick

Career history
- Houston Oilers (1979–1980)

Awards and highlights
- All-Southland Conference (1978)

Career NFL statistics
- Receptions: 1
- Receiving yards: 15
- Return yards: 717
- Stats at Pro Football Reference

Richard Ellender (born June 9, 1957) is an American former professional football player who was a wide receiver and return specialist for the Houston Oilers of the National Football League (NFL). He played college football for the McNeese State Cowboys.

== College career ==
Ellender played four seasons for the McNeese State University. He was named All-Southland Conference as a senior when he had 23 receptions for 402 yards and four touchdowns for the Cowboys. Ellender was inducted into McNeese State's Athletic Hall of Fame in 2003.

== Professional career ==
Ellender was selected 243rd overall in the ninth round of the 1979 NFL draft by the Houston Oilers. Ellender was originally cut during the preseason but was re-signed by the team. When he joined the team, the coach told him, "I don't wan't you to fumble, and every yard you move the ball toward the goal line, that's one less yard Earl [Campbell] will have to get by himself." Ellender finished the season with one reception for 15 yards and was the Oilers' leading punt and kick returner. Ellender was cut at the end of training camp in 1980.

== Personal life ==
Ellender stayed in Houston after his football career ended and works as a loans officer.
