= Andy Dorris =

American football player (born 1951)

No. 69, 88
- Position: Defensive end

Personal information
- Born: August 11, 1951 (age 75); Bellaire, Ohio, U.S.
- Listed height: 6 ft 5 in (1.96 m)
- Listed weight: 278 lb (126 kg)

Career information
- High school: Bellaire (Ohio)
- College: New Mexico State
- NFL draft: 1973: 4th round, 93rd overall pick

Career history
- St. Louis Cardinals (1973); New Orleans Saints (1973–1976); Seattle Seahawks (1977); Houston Oilers (1977–1981)

Career NFL statistics
- Sacks: 32
- Fumble recoveries: 6
- Stats at Pro Football Reference

Andy Dorris (born August 11, 1951) is an American former professional football player. He was born in Bellaire, Ohio and attended college at New Mexico State University. Dorris played in the National Football League (NFL) for 10 seasons. He spent most of his professional career with the New Orleans Saints and the Houston Oilers. Dorris is currently a sales representative for Forterra in Houston, Texas.

== Professional career ==
The Cleveland Browns drafted Dorris in the fourth round with the 93rd overall pick in the 1973 NFL draft. He initially signed a three-year contract with the team. Before the season began, Cleveland traded Dorris to the St. Louis Cardinals. He played in four games for St. Louis in his first season as a professional. In October 1973, St. Louis traded Dorris to the New Orleans Saints in exchange for a draft choice.

Dorris spent three full seasons with the Saints. In a game against the Atlanta Falcons in 1976, Dorris sacked Falcons quarterback Steve Bartkowski. Bartkowski left the game with a knee injury.

At the beginning of the 1977 NFL season, the Seattle Seahawks acquired Dorris from New Orleans. Dorris played four games for the Seahawks. The Seahawks placed him on waivers in October 1977. As a free agent, Dorris participated in tryouts for two teams, but he was rejected both times.

In November 1977, the Houston Oilers' Elvin Bethea broke his arm during a game. Coach "Bum" Philips replaced him with Andy Dorris. Dorris had planned to retire before being signed by Houston, saying "enough was enough", but joined the Oilers to see his former Saints teammate Steve Baumgartner. In Houston, Dorris was part of a team that came to be known as "Bum's boys." Under Bum's relaxed leadership style, Dorris bulked up and became a formidable defensive lineman.

In 1979, Dorris was the starting left defensive end for the Oilers. He recorded three sacks in a December matchup against the Denver Broncos. Dorris signed a new contract with the Oilers in 1980.

1979 and 1980 were two of the most successful seasons for the Houston Oilers franchise. In both seasons, the team finished the season with 11 wins and 5 losses but failed to make the Super Bowl.

Dorris was known as a locker-room prankster. He and a teammate once put blue dye in a shower head, turning a teammate's skin blue.

Houston placed Dorris on the injured reserve list at the beginning of the 1982 season, but he had already played his last game as a professional.

In 1990, he attended a reunion luncheon of many former Oilers players at the Southern Plantation Restaurant.

Dorris also had a pet lion cub.

== Later career ==
Dorris works as a sales representative for Thompson Pipe Group in Dallas, TX. The company produces pipes and precast concrete forms for a variety of commercial and industrial purposes.

== Awards and recognition ==
In his last year at New Mexico State, Dorris was named outstanding senior athlete.

In 2006, the Missouri Valley Conference announced its football "All-Centennial Team." Conference officials selected Andy Dorris as one of the 14 players representing the decade of the 1970s. Dorris was all-MVC at New Mexico State in 1972.

In 2007, Coach Philips and many of his former players, including Dorris, held a reunion during halftime of a Houston Texans game.

Dorris attended a New Mexico State Aggies football reunion in April 2012. The event consisted of a gathering of former players on Friday, April 27.

== Personal life ==
Dorris and his wife, Mary, have three children: Meredith, Sam, and Zach. He has nine grandchildren.
