= Carter Hartwig =

American football player (born 1956)

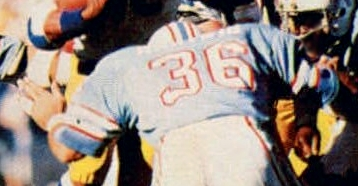
- Hartwig (36) playing for the Houston Oilers in 1979

No. 36
- Position: Defensive back

Personal information
- Born: February 27, 1956 (age 70); Culver City, California, U.S.
- Listed height: 6 ft 0 in (1.83 m)
- Listed weight: 205 lb (93 kg)

Career information
- High school: Central (Fresno, California)
- College: USC
- NFL draft: 1979: 8th round, 214th overall pick

Career history
- Houston Oilers (1979–1984)

Awards and highlights
- National champion (1978)

Career NFL statistics
- Interceptions: 9
- Fumble recoveries: 7
- Sacks: 1
- Stats at Pro Football Reference

Carter D. Hartwig (born February 27, 1956) is an American former professional football player who was a cornerback and safety for the Houston Oilers of the National Football League (NFL). He played college football for the USC Trojans.

== Early life ==
Hartwig played high school football at Central High School in Fresno, California. He then played college football for the USC Trojans, where he was part of the 1976 Trojan team and the 1978 Trojan team that both earned a share from some national selectors as the National Champion under head coach John Robinson.

Hartwig played in the Hula Bowl and Senior Bowl collegiate all-star games after his senior year. He was future Houston Oilers Head Coach Jeff Fisher's roommate at USC.

== Personal life ==
He married Carolyn Eaton and they had one son.

== Professional career ==
Hartwig was an 8th round pick (214th overall) by the Houston Oilers in the 1979 NFL draft. He played for the Oilers from 1979 to 1984.

== After Football ==
Hartwig ran a business in Arizona and has since retired.
