= Elvin Bethea =

American football player (born 1946)

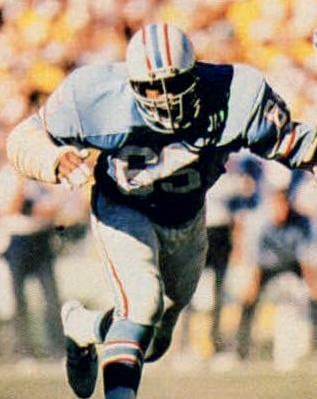
- Bethea playing for the Houston Oilers in 1979

No. 65
- Position: Defensive end

Personal information
- Born: March 1, 1946 (age 80); Trenton, New Jersey, U.S.
- Listed height: 6 ft 2 in (1.88 m)
- Listed weight: 260 lb (118 kg)

Career information
- High school: Trenton Central
- College: North Carolina A&T (1964–1967)
- NFL draft: 1968: 3rd round, 77th overall pick

Career history
- Houston Oilers (1968–1983)

Awards and highlights
- 2× Second-team All-Pro (1975, 1979); 8× Pro Bowl (1969, 1971–1975, 1978, 1979); Titans/Oilers Ring of Honor; Tennessee Titans No. 65 retired

Career NFL statistics
- Tackles: 691
- Sacks: 105
- Safeties: 2
- Fumble recoveries: 16
- Defensive touchdowns: 1
- Stats at Pro Football Reference
- Pro Football Hall of Fame

Elvin Lamont Bethea (born March 1, 1946) is an American former professional football player who spent his entire 16-year career as a defensive end with the Houston Oilers of the American Football League (AFL) and National Football League (NFL). He played college football for the North Carolina A&T Aggies and was the first player from the school to be elected to the Pro Football Hall of Fame, having been inducted in 2003.

== Early life ==
Bethea was born in Trenton, New Jersey, and played high school football and track at Trenton Central High School. He set the New Jersey state record in the shot put in 1964 at 66 feet 4 1/2 inches (20.2 m), which stood until 1997. Bethea won the shot put and discus competitions at the Golden West Invitational track meet in 1964.

Bethea also competed for the North Carolina A&T Aggies track and field team as a shot putter.

== Professional career ==
During his career in Houston, Bethea played in 210 games, including a stretch of 135 consecutive. He played at defensive end and guard in the 1968 season and did not miss a game until breaking his arm in a game against the Oakland Raiders in 1977. Bethea led the team in sacks six times, finishing his career with 105 unofficial sacks.

Bethea's career high was in 1973 with 16 sacks, which still ranks as the best in Oilers/Tennessee Titans history, a feat made more remarkable by the Oilers' 1–13 record. In 1976, he recorded 14 1/2 sacks, but was not voted to the Pro Bowl. In a game against the San Diego Chargers that year, Bethea recorded four sacks (his career high) and a fumble recovery.

Bethea also had 14 1/2 sacks in 1969. Other notable seasons in terms of sacks were: 1970 and 1971 with 10 1/2 sacks in each, 1975 with 10 and 1978 with eight. He played in the AFC Championship Game in 1978 and 1979.

== NFL career statistics ==
Legend
	Led the league
**Bold**	Career high

=== Regular season ===
Year	Team	Games		Tackles		Fumbles			
Year	Team	GP	GS	Sck	Sfty	FR	Yds	Y/F	TD
1968	HOU	14	4	0.5	0	0	0	—	0
1969	HOU	14	14	14.5	**1**	0	0	—	0
1970	HOU	14	14	10.5	0	2	0	0.0	0
1971	HOU	14	14	10.5	0	0	0	—	0
1972	HOU	14	14	7.0	0	**5**	0	0.0	0
1973	HOU	14	14	**16.0**	0	1	0	0.0	0
1974	HOU	14	14	5.0	0	2	**38**	**19.0**	**1**
1975	HOU	14	14	10.0	**1**	0	0	—	0
1976	HOU	14	14	14.5	0	2	4	2.0	0
1977	HOU	9	9	2.0	0	1	0	0.0	0
1978	HOU	**16**	**16**	8.0	0	1	0	0.0	0
1979	HOU	14	14	1.5	0	1	0	0.0	0
1980	HOU	14	12	2.0	0	1	0	0.0	0
1981	HOU	15	14	2.0	0	0	0	—	0
1982	HOU	9	0	1.0	0	0	0	—	0
1983	HOU	7	0	0.0	0	0	0	—	0
Career		210	181	105.0	2	16	42	2.6	1

=== Postseason ===
Year	Team	Games		Sck
Year	Team	GP	GS	Sck
1969	HOU	1	1	1.0
1978	HOU	**3**	**3**	**2.0**
1979	HOU	**3**	**3**	**2.0**
1980	HOU	1	1	**2.0**
Career		8	8	7.0

== Awards and honors ==
Bethea was Second-team All-Pro in 1969, 1973, 1978 and 1979 to go with his eight Pro Bowl selections.

Bethea was elected to the Pro Football Hall of Fame in 2003. He was officially inducted during the Enshrinement Ceremony on August 3, 2003, where his college coach and presenter, Hornsby Howell, unveiled the bust of Bethea, which was sculpted by Scott Myers.

In 2005, Bethea was inducted to the North Carolina Sports Hall of Fame He was also inducted into the Texas Sports Hall of Fame.

== Book ==
Bethea is the author of Smash-Mouth: My Football Journey from Trenton to Canton.
