= J. C. Wilson =

American football player (1956–2023)

No. 33
- Position: Cornerback

Personal information
- Born: March 11, 1956; Cleveland, Ohio, U.S.
- Died: March 11, 2023 (aged 67)
- Listed height: 6 ft 0 in (1.83 m)
- Listed weight: 178 lb (81 kg)

Career information
- High school: East (Cleveland)
- College: Pittsburgh
- NFL draft: 1978: 8th round, 210th overall pick

Career history
- Houston Oilers (1978–1983)

Awards and highlights
- National champion (1976); Second-team All-East (1977)

Career NFL statistics
- Games played: 84
- Interceptions: 11
- INT yards: 172
- Touchdowns: 1
- Stats at Pro Football Reference

James Calvin Wilson (March 11, 1956 – March 11, 2023) was an American professional football player who was a cornerback for the Houston Oilers of the National Football League (NFL). He played college football for the Pittsburgh Panthers.
