= David Carter (offensive lineman) =

American football player (1953–2021)

No. 58, 65
- Positions: Guard, center

Personal information
- Born: November 27, 1953; Vincennes, Indiana, U.S.
- Died: July 10, 2021 (aged 67); Houston, Texas, U.S.
- Listed height: 6 ft 2 in (1.88 m)
- Listed weight: 250 lb (113 kg)

Career information
- High school: Vincennes Lincoln
- College: Western Kentucky
- NFL draft: 1977: 6th round, 165th overall pick

Career history
- Houston Oilers (1977–1984); New Orleans Saints (1984–1985)

Career NFL statistics
- Games played: 121
- Games started: 42
- Fumble recoveries: 5
- Stats at Pro Football Reference

David C. Carter (November 27, 1953 – July 10, 2021) was an American professional football player who was an offensive guard and center for nine seasons in the National Football League (NFL) for the Houston Oilers and New Orleans Saints. He played college football at Western Kentucky University.

Carter died on July 10, 2021, at the age of 67.
