= Morris Towns =

American football player (born 1954)

No. 76, 62
- Position: Offensive tackle

Personal information
- Born: January 10, 1954 (age 72); St. Louis, Missouri, U.S.
- Listed height: 6 ft 4 in (1.93 m)
- Listed weight: 270 lb (122 kg)

Career information
- High school: Vashon (St. Louis)
- College: Missouri
- NFL draft: 1977: 1st round, 11th overall pick

Career history
- Houston Oilers (1977–1983); Washington Redskins (1984)

Awards and highlights
- Second-team All-Big Eight (1976)

Career NFL statistics
- Games played: 92
- Games started: 67
- Stats at Pro Football Reference

Morris M. Towns (born January 10, 1954) is an American former professional football player who was an offensive tackle for the Houston Oilers and the Washington Redskins of the National Football League (NFL). He played college football for the Missouri Tigers and was selected by the Oilers in the first round of the 1977 NFL draft.

== College career ==
Morris Towns attended the University of Missouri where he played offensive tackle for the Missouri Tigers football team from 1974 to 1976. He won his first letter as a sophomore. He started becoming more noticed in his junior season and was noted for holding more than his own against future 1976 NFL draft first-overall pick Lee Roy Selmon. Towns was a part of the 1976 College Football All-America Team in his senior year. In college, Towns was selected to the Blue–Gray Football Classic, the Hula Bowl, and the Japan Bowl.

Towns was inducted into the 2006 class of the University of Missouri Athletics Hall of Fame.

== Professional career ==
=== Houston Oilers ===
Towns was selected in the first round (11th overall) by the Houston Oilers in the 1977 NFL draft. He played with the Oilers for seven seasons from 1977 to 1983. He started all 16 games in only 1979 and 1981, but did start all nine games in the strike-shortened 1982 season.

=== Washington Redskins ===
Towns played for the Washington Redskins in the 1984 season, but did not start any games.

== Personal life ==
Towns was a standout student at the University of Missouri and majored in engineering. He is a civil design engineer. He resides in Richmond, Texas with his wife Bridgette and has two children, Raven and Brittany.
