= Tim Wilson (American football) =

American football player (1954–1996)

No. 45, 89
- Position: Running back

Personal information
- Born: January 14, 1954; New Castle, Delaware, U.S.
- Died: November 23, 1996 (aged 42)
- Listed height: 6 ft 3 in (1.91 m)
- Listed weight: 226 lb (103 kg)

Career information
- College: Maryland
- NFL draft: 1977: 3rd round, 66th overall pick

Career history
- Houston Oilers (1977–1982); Los Angeles Raiders (1983*); New Orleans Saints (1983–1984)
- * Offseason or practice squad member only

Career NFL statistics
- Rushing attempts: 398
- Rushing yards: 1,414
- Total TDs: 9
- Stats at Pro Football Reference

Tim Wilson (January 14, 1954 – November 23, 1996) was an American professional football player who was a running back in the National Football League (NFL) for the Houston Oilers and New Orleans Saints. He was a lead blocker for Hall of Fame running back Earl Campbell. He played college football at the University of Maryland.

In 1991, Wilson was inducted into the Delaware Sports Museum and Hall of Fame.

== Personal life ==
Wilson's son, Josh, also played for Maryland and was selected 66th overall by the Seattle Seahawks in the second round of the 2007 NFL draft.

Wilson died of a heart attack on November 23, 1996.
