= Ken Burrough =

American football player (1948–2022)

No. 00
- Position: Wide receiver

Personal information
- Born: July 14, 1948; Jacksonville, Florida, U.S.
- Died: February 24, 2022 (aged 73); Jacksonville, Florida, U.S.
- Listed height: 6 ft 3 in (1.91 m)
- Listed weight: 215 lb (98 kg)

Career information
- High school: William M. Raines (Jacksonville)
- College: Texas Southern (1966-1969)
- NFL draft: 1970: 1st round, 10th overall pick

Career history
- New Orleans Saints (1970); Houston Oilers (1971–1981)

Awards and highlights
- Second-team All-Pro (1977); 2× Pro Bowl (1975, 1977); NFL receiving yards leader (1975); Second-team All-American (1969)

Career NFL statistics
- Receptions: 421
- Receiving yards: 7,102
- Receiving touchdowns: 49
- Stats at Pro Football Reference

Kenneth Othell Burrough (July 14, 1948 – February 24, 2022) was an American professional football player who was a wide receiver for the Houston Oilers of the National Football League (NFL). He played college football for the Texas Southern Tigers and was named second-team All-American in 1969.

He was a track star and played as a quarterback at William M. Raines High School. He is one of four players in the NFL to have worn jersey number 00, the others being Jim Otto, Johnny Clement and Steve Bagarus.

== Career ==
Burrough was selected by the New Orleans Saints in the first round (10th overall) of the 1970 NFL draft. He missed much playing time his first season due to minor injuries, catching only 13 passes for 196 yards and two touchdowns. In January 1971, Burrough and fellow Saint player Dave Rowe were traded to the Oilers in exchange for Hoyle Granger, Terry Stoepel, Charles Blossom, and a draft choice to be named later.

Burrough played eleven seasons with the Oilers, from 1971 through 1981. In 1975, Burrough was selected to the Pro Bowl, leading all NFL wide receivers with 1,063 receiving yards, the only receiver to gain more than a thousand yards for the season. He scored eight touchdowns that year, and averaged 20.1 yards per reception. In his book, More Distant Memories: Pro Football's Best Ever Players of the 50s, 60s, and 70s, Danny Jones wrote that Burrough was "one of the most dangerous game breakers in the NFL along with Cliff Branch (Raiders), Mel Gray (Cardinals), and O. J. Simpson (Bills)." Six of Burrough's eight touchdowns were of 50 or greater yards. In a week thirteen game against the playoff-bound Raiders, Burrough caught four passes for 112 yards and two touchdowns, including a screen pass from quarterback Dan Pastorini which he turned into a 68-yard touchdown with his open field running skills.

Burrough was also selected to the Pro Bowl in 1977. The Oilers won post-season games in the 1978 and 1979 seasons, making it to the AFC Championship both years, but lost to the Pittsburgh Steelers, the eventual Super Bowl champions.

Burrough was the last of three NFL players to ever wear the number 00 on his jersey. The league restricted all numbers to between 1 and 89 in 1973 (later expanded to 1 and 99 in 1987), but Burrough and Oakland Raiders' center Jim Otto, both of whom wore 00 at the time, were covered under a grandfather clause for the rest of their careers. Steve Bagarus, the earliest player to use 00, had already retired after the 1948 NFL season.

Burrough has the third most receiving yards in Oilers/Titans history with 6,906 and tied for third in receiving touchdowns with 47. He ranks 85th on NFL All-Time Yards per Reception List with 16.9 yards per pass reception.

== NFL career statistics ==
Legend
	Led the league
**Bold**	Career high

=== Regular season ===
Year	Team	Games		Receiving				
Year	Team	GP	GS	Rec	Yds	Avg	Lng	TD
1970	NOR	12	0	13	196	15.1	35	2
1971	HOU	13	0	25	370	14.8	62	1
1972	HOU	14	11	26	521	20.0	80	4
1973	HOU	14	12	43	577	13.4	49	2
1974	HOU	11	11	36	492	13.7	51	2
1975	HOU	14	14	**53**	**1,063**	20.1	77	**8**
1976	HOU	14	14	51	932	18.3	69	7
1977	HOU	14	14	43	816	19.0	**85**	**8**
1978	HOU	**16**	**16**	47	624	13.3	44	2
1979	HOU	**16**	**16**	40	752	18.8	55	6
1980	HOU	2	0	4	91	**22.8**	54	0
1981	HOU	**16**	**16**	40	668	16.7	71	7
Career		156	124	421	7,102	16.9	85	49

=== Playoffs ===
Year	Team	Games		Receiving				
Year	Team	GP	GS	Rec	Yds	Avg	Lng	TD
1978	HOU	**3**	**3**	**9**	**194**	**21.6**	**71**	**1**
1979	HOU	**3**	2	0	0	0.0	0	0
Career		6	5	9	194	21.6	71	1

== Later life and death ==
In 2016, Burrough was inducted into the Black College Football Hall of Fame.

Burrough died in Jacksonville, Florida, on February 24, 2022, at the age of 73.
