= Mike Reinfeldt =

American football player and executive (born 1953)

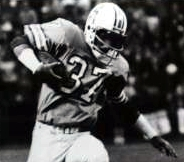
- Reinfeldt pictured later in his career with the Oilers

No. 37
- Position: Safety

Personal information
- Born: May 6, 1953 (age 73); Baraboo, Wisconsin, U.S.
- Listed height: 6 ft 2 in (1.88 m)
- Listed weight: 192 lb (87 kg)

Career information
- High school: Baraboo
- College: UW–Milwaukee
- NFL draft: 1975: undrafted

Career history
- Oakland Raiders (1975–1976); Houston Oilers (1976–1983)

Awards and highlights
- First-team All-Pro (1979); Pro Bowl (1979); NFL interceptions leader (1979); Super Bowl champion (XI)

Career NFL statistics
- Interceptions: 26
- Fumble recoveries: 11
- Defensive touchdowns: 1
- Stats at Pro Football Reference
- Executive profile at Pro Football Reference

Michael Ray Reinfeldt (born May 6, 1953) is an American former professional football player and executive in the National Football League (NFL). He attended the University of Wisconsin–Milwaukee and was the captain of the Panthers in their last season of varsity football in 1974. Reinfeldt played as a safety for eight seasons in the NFL with the Oakland Raiders in 1976 and with the Houston Oilers from 1976 to 1983. In 2007, he was named general manager of the NFL's Tennessee Titans. An All-Pro safety with the team from 1976 to 1983 in Houston, he re-joined the franchise after spending seven years with the Seattle Seahawks.

== Biography ==
While playing with the Houston Oilers, Reinfeldt was a roommate of Ted Thompson, then an Oilers linebacker and finally the general manager for the Tennessee Titans.

In Seattle, Reinfeldt last held the title of vice president of football administration and was responsible for player contract negotiations, salary cap management, player evaluations and numerous aspects of the day-to-day football operations. He came to the Seahawks from the Packers in 1998.

In eight seasons at Green Bay, he served a number of roles, including chief financial officer for three years (1991–1993) and VP of administration from 1994 to 1998. While with the Packers and under his financial leadership, the team's cash reserves went from $4.5 million in 1991 to more than $50 million in 1998 and improved in revenues from 23rd in 1993 to ninth in 1997.

Before joining the Packers’ front office in 1991, Reinfeldt spent three years (1988–1990) at the University of Southern California as the associate athletic director and spent another three years (1985–1988) with the Los Angeles Raiders as the chief financial officer. He earned an MBA in management and finance at Houston Baptist University.
