= Art Stringer =

American football player (born 1954)

No. 39, 53, 56
- Position: Linebacker

Personal information
- Born: January 30, 1954 (age 72); Troy, Alabama, U.S.
- Listed height: 6 ft 1 in (1.85 m)
- Listed weight: 223 lb (101 kg)

Career information
- High school: Northwestern
- College: Ball State (1972–1975)
- NFL draft: 1976: 9th round, 256th overall pick

Career history
- Houston Oilers (1977–1981)

Career NFL statistics
- Interceptions: 4
- Fumble recoveries: 2
- Sacks: 2
- Stats at Pro Football Reference

Arthur Stringer (born January 30, 1954) is an American former professional football player who was a linebacker for five seasons with the Houston Oilers of the National Football League (NFL) from 1977 to 1981. He played college football for the Ball State Cardinals.
