= Ed Fisher (American football) =

American football player (born 1949)

No. 70, 60
- Position: Guard

Personal information
- Born: May 31, 1949 (age 77); Stockton, California, U.S.
- Listed height: 6 ft 3 in (1.91 m)
- Listed weight: 249 lb (113 kg)

Career information
- High school: Lincoln (CA)
- College: Arizona State
- NFL draft: 1971: undrafted

Career history
- Kansas City Chiefs (1973)*; Houston Oilers (1974–1982)
- * Offseason or practice squad member only

Career NFL statistics
- Games played: 126
- Stats at Pro Football Reference

Edwin Louis Fisher (born May 31, 1949) is an American former professional football player who was a guard for nine seasons in the National Football League (NFL). He later played for the Los Angeles Express of the United States Football League (USFL). Fisher played college football for the Arizona State Sun Devils.
