= Ted Washington Sr. =

American football player (born 1948)

Ted Washington, Sr.
No. 53, 59
- Position: Linebacker

Personal information
- Born: February 16, 1948; Tampa, Florida, U.S.
- Died: May 8, 2017 (aged 69); Alabama, U.S.
- Listed height: 6 ft 1 in (1.85 m)
- Listed weight: 244 lb (111 kg)

Career information
- High school: George S. Middleton (Tampa)
- College: Mississippi Valley State
- NFL draft: 1972: 17th round, 439th overall pick

Career history
- Kansas City Chiefs (1972)*; Houston Oilers (1973–1982)
- * Offseason or practice squad member only

Career NFL statistics
- Sacks: 45
- Fumble recoveries: 9
- Interceptions: 7
- Stats at Pro Football Reference

Theodore Bernard Washington Sr. (February 16, 1948 – May 8, 2017) was an American professional football player who was a linebacker in the National Football League (NFL).

He played ten seasons with the Houston Oilers, playing outside linebacker. Washington attended George S. Middleton High School in Tampa, graduated from Tuskegee Institute High School in Tuskegee, Alabama and later played collegiate football at Mississippi Valley State University. Washington earned a bachelor's degree in Health and Physical Education from MVSU, a master's degree in Guidance and Counseling from Tuskegee University, and devoted his life to Christian ministry following retirement from the NFL. He was the father of former NFL player Ted Washington Jr.
