= Carl Mauck =

American football player and coach (born 1947)

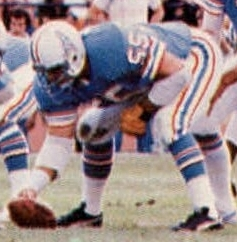
- Mauck playing for the Houston Oilers in 1978

No. 67, 60, 55
- Position: Center

Personal information
- Born: July 7, 1947 (age 79); McLeansboro, Illinois, U.S.
- Listed height: 6 ft 4 in (1.93 m)
- Listed weight: 243 lb (110 kg)

Career information
- High school: McLeansboro
- College: Southern Illinois (1965-1968)
- NFL draft: 1969: 13th round, 337th overall pick

Career history

Playing
- Baltimore Colts (1969); Miami Dolphins (1970); San Diego Chargers (1971–1974); Houston Oilers (1975–1981)

Coaching
- New Orleans Saints (1982–1985) Offensive line coach; Kansas City Chiefs (1986–1988) Offensive line coach; Tampa Bay Buccaneers (1991) Offensive line coach; San Diego Chargers (1992–1995) Offensive line coach; Arizona Cardinals (1996–1997) Offensive line coach; Buffalo Bills (1998–2000) Offensive line coach; Detroit Lions (2001–2003) Offensive line coach; San Diego Chargers (2005) Offensive line coach; Southern Illinois (2006–2007) Tight ends coach

Career NFL statistics
- Games played: 166
- Games started: 151
- Fumble recoveries: 8
- Stats at Pro Football Reference

Carl Frey Mauck (born July 7, 1947) is an American former professional football player and coach in the National Football League (NFL). He played three seasons as a center for four NFL teams and later served as an offensive line coach for several teams. Mauck played college football for the Southern Illinois Salukis.

== Early life and college career ==
Mauck was born July 7, 1947, in McLeansboro, Illinois. He prepped at McLeansboro Township High School before earning a scholarship to Southern Illinois University, where he played center and linebacker. He also played basketball as a freshman, lining up alongside future National Basketball Association (NBA) great Walt Frazier.

Mauck graduated from Southern Illinois in 1969 with a degree in business management.

== NFL playing career ==
Mauck's playing career in the National Football League (NFL) spanned 13 seasons, from 1969 to 1981. He played in 166 career regular-season games, including a stretch of 156 in a row. He also played in eight career playoff games, including back-to-back AFC Championship Games for Houston in 1978 and 1979.

Mauck's NFL career started with the Baltimore Colts in 1969 and the Miami Dolphins in 1970. He spent the 1971 through 1974 seasons with the San Diego Chargers before finishing his career with the Houston Oilers, from 1975 to 1981. Wade Phillips was an assistant coach with the Oilers during Mauck's playing tenure, and his father, Bum Phillips, was the head coach. Bum Phillips was also an assistant coach in San Diego when Mauck played for the Chargers. Mauck later coached on Wade Phillips' staff in Buffalo.

== Coaching career ==
Mauck's first NFL coaching stint was with the New Orleans Saints from 1982 to 1985. He then served with the Kansas City Chiefs (1986–1988), Tampa Bay Buccaneers (1991), San Diego Chargers (1992–1995), Arizona Cardinals (1996–97), Buffalo Bills (1998–2000), and Detroit Lions (2001–2003). He returned to the Chargers in 2005. During his first stint in San Diego, the Chargers appeared in the playoffs following three of those four seasons, including Super Bowl XXIX following the 1994 season. During his last two seasons in Detroit, the Lions allowed the fewest sacks in the NFL, surrendering 20 sacks in 2002 and only 11 in 2003.

== Honors ==
Mauck was enshrined in the Saluki Hall of Fame in 1979. In 2010 he was elected by the NFLAlumni to represent Advocacy for Retired NFL Players. In 2011 Mauck's hometown of McLeansboro, Illinois named their football field after him. Mauck was selected to SIU Saluki Football All-Century Team in 2013. In 2017, he received the Gerald R. Ford Legends Award named for Gerald Ford, the 38th President of the United States. The award is presented at the Rimington Trophy banquet to former collegiate or professional centers who, in addition to standout football careers, have also made significant contributions to the football and/or business communities, or through philanthropic endeavor. In 2017 Mauck was enshrined in the St. Louis Sports Hall of Fame Illinois.

== Family ==
Mauck and his wife, Vicki, have four children: Tim, Chrissy, Teresa and Cathy.
