= Gregg Bingham =

American football player (born 1951)

No. 54
- Position: Linebacker

Personal information
- Born: March 13, 1951 (age 75); Evanston, Illinois, U.S.
- Listed height: 6 ft 1 in (1.85 m)
- Listed weight: 227 lb (103 kg)

Career information
- High school: DePaul College Prep (IL)
- College: Purdue
- NFL draft: 1973: 4th round, 79th overall pick

Career history
- Houston Oilers (1973–1984)

Awards and highlights
- 2× First-team All-Big Ten (1971, 1972)

Career NFL statistics
- Sacks: 14.5
- Fumble recoveries: 14
- Interceptions: 21
- Stats at Pro Football Reference

Gregory Raleigh Bingham (born March 13, 1951) is a former National Football League (NFL) linebacker, who played from 1973 through 1984 for the Houston Oilers. He had 4 touchdowns and led the league in tackles for 11 years. He played football at Chicago's Gordon Tech High School as a tight end and linebacker and was the team's leading tackler.

Bingham went on from Gordon Tech to play middle guard / nose tackle for the Purdue Boilermakers, starting 1971 through 1973, his last three years. Known for "going all out on every single play", Bingham earned first-team All-Big Ten honors in his junior and senior years of 1971 and 1972 and likely would have in 1970 his sophomore year if not for breaking his ankle in an early season upset of then-ranked #3 Stanford University in Palo Alto.

Bingham is a noted coin collector and has owned an extensive collection of commemorative half dollars, as well as a complete collection of Morgan dollars.
