= Greg Stemrick =

American football player (1951–2016)

No. 27
- Position: Cornerback

Personal information
- Born: October 25, 1951; Cincinnati, Ohio, U.S.
- Died: August 2, 2016 (aged 64); Cincinnati, Ohio, U.S.
- Listed height: 5 ft 11 in (1.80 m)
- Listed weight: 185 lb (84 kg)

Career information
- College: Colorado State
- NFL draft: 1974: undrafted

Career history
- Houston Oilers (1974–1982); New Orleans Saints (1983)

Awards and highlights
- Pro Bowl (1980)

Career NFL statistics
- Interceptions: 15
- Fumble recoveries: 6
- Defensive TDs: 1
- Stats at Pro Football Reference

Gregory Earl Stemrick (October 25, 1951 – August 2, 2016) was an American professional football player who was a defensive back in the National Football League (NFL) for the Houston Oilers and New Orleans Saints. Before his professional career, Stemrick played college football for the Colorado State Rams. He then played for the Chicago Fire of the World Football League (WFL). He died of a heart attack in 2016.
