= 1969 Houston Oilers season =

NFL team season

- Owner: Bud Adams
- General manager: Don Klosterman
- Head coach: Wally Lemm
- Home stadium: Houston Astrodome

Results
- Record: 6–6–2
- Division place: 2nd AFL Eastern
- Playoffs: Lost Divisional Playoffs (at Raiders) 7–56

The 1969 Houston Oilers season was the tenth and final season for the Houston Oilers as a professional AFL franchise before moving to the National Football League when the two merged. The team equaled their 1968 record of 7–7 (.500), finishing 6–6–2. They qualified for the playoffs but lost in the divisional round to the Oakland Raiders.

== Roster ==
1969 Houston Oilers roster
Quarterbacks: 11 Pete Beathard; 12 Bob Davis; 10 Don Trull; Running backs: 25 Ode Burrell P; 35 Woody Campbell; 32 Hoyle Granger; 36 Roy Hopkins; 36 Rich Johnson; 24 Mike Richardson; Wide receivers: 81 Jim Beirne; 84 Mac Haik; 23 Jerry LeVias; 87 Paul Zaeske; Tight ends: 88 Ed Carrington; 89 Alvin Reed	Offensive linemen: 61 Hank Autry C; 66 Sonny Bishop G; 75 Elbert Drungo T; 78 Glen Ray Hines T; 62 Jim LeMoine G; 50 Bobby Maples C; 60 Tom Regner G; 76 Walter Suggs T; Defensive linemen: 65 Elvin Bethea DE; 71 Tom Domres DT; 79 Pat Holmes DE; 74 Willie Parker DT; 70 Carel Stith DT	Linebackers: 52 Garland Boyette MLB; 58 Ron Pritchard OLB; 56 Olen Underwood OLB; 53 Loyd Wainscott MLB; 90 George Webster OLB; Defensive backs: 21 John Douglas CB; 20 Miller Farr CB; 33 W. K. Hicks FS; 29 Ken Houston SS; 22 Zeke Moore CB; 44 Johnny Peacock FS; Special teams: 3 Roy Gerela K/P	Reserve lists: 40 Charlie Joiner WR (IR); 41 Leroy Mitchell CB (IR); 72 George Rice DT (IR); 30 Bob Smith S (Military); Practice squad: -- Billy Alsbrooks CB; 84 Donnie Davis TE; 6 Carl Gentile K; 77 Ben Mayes DE; 14 Bob Naponic QB; 54 Ed Watson LB; 80 Glenn Woods DE; rookies in italics

== Season schedule ==
Week	Date	Opponent	Result	Record	Venue	Attendance	Recap
1	September 14	at Oakland Raiders	**L** 17–21	0–1	Oakland–Alameda County Coliseum	49,361	Recap
2	September 21	at **Buffalo Bills**	**W** 17–3	1–1	War Memorial Stadium	40,146	Recap
3	September 28	**Miami Dolphins**	**W** 22–10	2–1	Houston Astrodome	41,086	Recap
4	October 5	**Buffalo Bills**	**W** 28–14	3–1	Houston Astrodome	46,485	Recap
5	October 12	at Kansas City Chiefs	**L** 0–24	3–2	Municipal Stadium	45,805	Recap
6	October 20	at **New York Jets**	**L** 17–26	3–3	Shea Stadium	63,841	Recap
7	October 26	Denver Broncos	**W** 24–21	4–3	Houston Astrodome	45,348	Recap
8	November 2	at **Boston Patriots**	**L** 0–24	4–4	Alumni Stadium	19,006	Recap
9	November 9	Cincinnati Bengals	**T** 31–31	4–4–1	Houston Astrodome	45,298	Recap
10	November 16	at Denver Broncos	**T** 20–20	4–4–2	Mile High Stadium	45,002	Recap
11	November 23	at **Miami Dolphins**	**W** 32–7	5–4–2	Miami Orange Bowl	27,218	Recap
12	November 27	San Diego Chargers	**L** 17–21	5–5–2	Houston Astrodome	40,065	Recap
13	December 6	**New York Jets**	**L** 26–34	5–6–2	Houston Astrodome	51,923	Recap
14	December 14	**Boston Patriots**	**W** 27–23	6–6–2	Houston Astrodome	39,215	Recap
Note: Intra-division opponents are in **bold** text.

== Game summaries ==
=== Week 1 ===
The Oilers opened the season at Oakland–Alameda County Coliseum and fell behind the Raiders 14–0 in the first quarter. They scored 17 points the next three quarters, but Daryle Lamonica unloaded a 64-yard touchdown to Warren Wells for the 21–17 Raiders win. Pete Beathard had one touchdown but also two interceptions

=== Week 2 ===
Team	1	2	3	4	Total
• Oilers	0	7	3	7	17
Bills	3	0	0	0	3

- Date: September 21
- Location: War Memorial Stadium, Buffalo, New York
- Game weather: 58 °F (14 °C), wind 6 mph

Scoring summary
1	BUF	Bruce Alford 14 yard field goal	Bills 3–0
2	HOU	Alvin Reed 12 yard pass from Pete Beathard (Roy Gerela kick)	Oilers 7–3
3	HOU	Roy Gerela 21 yard field goal	Oilers 10–3
4	HOU	Hoyle Granger 1 yard run (Roy Gerela kick)	Oilers 17–3

The Oilers intercepted Jack Kemp three times and limited him to 99 passing yards as they scored on Alvin Reed's 12-yard touchdown catch, a Roy Gerela field goal, and Hoyle Granger score.

=== Week 3 ===
Roy Gerela booted five field goals as the Oilers' home opener at the Astrodome was a 22–10 win over the Dolphins. Bob Griese had one touchdown, one interception, and was sacked five times.

=== Week 4 ===
The Oilers faced Buffalo for the second time in three weeks and scored a touchdown in each quarter, winning 28–14. Jack Kemp threw for 223 yards, nearly reaching Houston's total offensive output of 252 yards.

=== Week 5 ===
The Oilers traveled to Kansas City but came out with a shutout loss. The game saw a combined seventeen turnovers and just 345 combined yards of offense as the Chiefs put up 24 points for the 24–0 win.

=== Week 6 ===
A full year before the debut of Monday Night Football the defending champion Jets hosted the Oilers on Monday Night and ground out a 23–17 win. Both teams combined for six turnovers (Zeke Moore put up Houston's first touchdown returning a Joe Namath pick in the second quarter) as Namath (306 passing yards) came out on top of Pete Beathard's 314 yards.

=== Week 7 ===
With both teams at 3–3 the Oilers returned to the Astrodome to face Lou Saban and the Broncos. The game lead tied or changed on every score; the Oilers took a 14–7 lead in the second before Denver tied it at halftime; the Broncos then scored in the third on Floyd Little's three-yard run; in the fourth Roy Hopkins of the Oilers broke through for a 43-yard touchdown, then the Oilers won on Roy Gerela's 22-yard field goal and the 24–21 final.

== Playoffs ==
Round	Date	Opponent	Result	Venue	Attendance	Game recap
Divisional	December 21	at Oakland Raiders	L 7–56	Oakland–Alameda County Coliseum	53,539	Recap

== Standings ==
AFL Eastern Division
	W	L	T	PCT	DIV	PF	PA	STK
New York Jets	10	4	0	.714	8–0	353	269	W2
Houston Oilers	6	6	2	.500	5–3	278	279	W1
Boston Patriots	4	10	0	.286	3–5	266	316	L2
Buffalo Bills	4	10	0	.286	2–6	230	359	L2
Miami Dolphins	3	10	1	.231	2–6	233	332	L1

Note: Tie games were not officially counted in the standings of the AFL.
