= 1970 Houston Oilers season =

NFL team season

- Owner: Bud Adams
- Head coach: Wally Lemm
- Home stadium: Houston Astrodome

Results
- Record: 3–10–1
- Division place: 4th AFC Central
- Playoffs: Did not qualify

The 1970 Houston Oilers season was the 11th season overall and its first as part of the National Football League. The team failed to improve on their previous season's 6–6–2 record, winning only three games. The Oilers started the season winning two of its first three games, both road wins against the Steelers and Bengals.

The Oilers struggled the rest of the season, as they went 0–6–1 following the 2-1 start. In week five versus the Steelers in the Astrodome, starting quarterback Charley Johnson suffered a broken clavicle when he was clipped by Pittsburgh defensive tackle Chuck Hinton on an interception return. Johnson returned after missing four games but was nowhere near as effective than before the injury.

The Oilers won only one of their last 11 games, a 31–21 win over the Denver Broncos, before losing their final 3 games of the season, including a 52–10 rout by in-state rival Dallas in the finale, to finish the season 3–10–1. They missed the playoffs for the second time in three seasons, and for the first of eight consecutive seasons.

== Offseason ==
=== NFL draft ===
1970 Houston Oilers draft
Round	Pick	Player	Position	College	Notes
1	14	Doug Wilkerson *	Guard	North Carolina Central	
2	31	Leo Brooks *	Defensive tackle	Texas	from Boston
2	40	Bill Dusenbery	Running back	Johnson C. Smith	
4	92	Spike Jones	Punter	Georgia	
5	110	Ron Saul	Guard	Michigan State	from Cincinnati via N. Y. Jets
5	118	Ed Duley	Defensive tackle	Northern Arizona	
6	144	Benny Johnson	Cornerback	Johnson C. Smith	
7	170	Charles Olson	Defensive back	Concordia (Moorhead)	
8	196	Mike McClish	Tackle	Wisconsin	
9	222	Charlie Blossom	Defensive end	Texas Southern	
10	249	Joe Dawkins	Running back	Wisconsin	
11	274	Robert Morris	Center	Duke	
12	300	Richard Dawkins	Tight end	Johnson C. Smith	
13	326	Jess Lewis	Linebacker	Oregon State	
14	352	Claire Rasmussen	Guard	Wisconsin–Oshkosh	
15	378	David Sharp	Tackle	Stanford	
Made roster * Made at least one Pro Bowl during career

== Roster ==
1970 Houston Oilers roster
Quarterbacks (QB): 14 Bob Naponic; 17 Jerry Rhome; Running backs (RB): 34 Joe Dawkins; 36 Roy Hopkins; 24 Mike Richardson; 39 Tom Smiley; Wide receivers (WR): 81 Jim Beirne; 84 Mac Haik; 18 Charlie Joiner; 23 Jerry LeVias; Tight ends (TE): 84 Donnie Davis; 89 Alvin Reed	Offensive linemen (OL): 61 Hank Autry C; 75 Elbert Drungo G; 62 Ken Gray G; 78 Glen Ray Hines T; 50 Bobby Maples C; 64 Ron Saul G; 69 Terry Stoepel T; 76 Walter Suggs T; 63 Doug Wilkerson G; Defensive linemen (DL): 65 Elvin Bethea DE; 73 Leo Brooks DT; 71 Tom Domres DT; 79 Pat Holmes DE; 77 Spain Musgrove DE; 74 Willie Parker DT	Linebackers (LB): 52 Garland Boyette MLB; 37 Jess Lewis OLB; 58 Ron Pritchard OLB; 56 Olen Underwood OLB; 53 Loyd Wainscott MLB; Defensive backs (DB): 48 Bob Atkins CB/S; 29 Ken Houston SS; 33 Benny Johnson CB; 41 Leroy Mitchell CB; 22 Zeke Moore CB; 44 Johnny Peacock FS; Special teams (ST): 3 Roy Gerela K; 11 Spike Jones P	Practice squad: 82 Charley Blossom DE; 88 Claude Harvey LB; 57 Ken Mendenhall C; 87 Paul Zaeske WR; Reserve: 35 Woody Campbell RB (IR); 21 John Douglas CB (IR); 32 Hoyle Granger RB (IR); 12 Charley Johnson QB (IR); 60 Tom Regner G (IR); 90 George Webster LB (IR); Rookies in italics 40 active, 6 reserve, 4 practice squad

== Schedule ==
Week	Date	Opponent	Result	Record	Venue	Attendance	Recap
1	September 20	at **Pittsburgh Steelers**	**W** 19–7	1–0	Three Rivers Stadium	45,538	Recap
2	September 27	Miami Dolphins	**L** 10–20	1–1	Houston Astrodome	39,840	Recap
3	October 4	at **Cincinnati Bengals**	**W** 20–13	2–1	Riverfront Stadium	55,094	Recap
4	October 11	Baltimore Colts	**L** 20–24	2–2	Houston Astrodome	48,050	Recap
5	October 18	**Pittsburgh Steelers**	**L** 3–7	2–3	Houston Astrodome	42,799	Recap
6	October 25	at San Diego Chargers	**T** 31–31	2–3–1	San Diego Stadium	41,427	Recap
7	November 1	at St. Louis Cardinals	**L** 0–44	2–4–1	Busch Memorial Stadium	47,911	Recap
8	November 8	at Kansas City Chiefs	**L** 9–24	2–5–1	Municipal Stadium	49,810	Recap
9	November 15	San Francisco 49ers	**L** 20–30	2–6–1	Houston Astrodome	43,040	Recap
10	November 22	at **Cleveland Browns**	**L** 14–28	2–7–1	Cleveland Stadium	74,723	Recap
11	November 29	Denver Broncos	**W** 31–21	3–7–1	Houston Astrodome	35,733	Recap
12	December 7	**Cleveland Browns**	**L** 10–21	3–8–1	Houston Astrodome	50,582	Recap
13	December 13	**Cincinnati Bengals**	**L** 20–30	3–9–1	Houston Astrodome	34,435	Recap
14	December 20	at Dallas Cowboys	**L** 10–52	3–10–1	Cotton Bowl	50,504	Recap
Note: Intra-division opponents are in **bold** text.

== Standings ==
AFC Central
	W	L	T	PCT	DIV	CONF	PF	PA	STK
Cincinnati Bengals	8	6	0	.571	3–3	7–4	312	255	W7
Cleveland Browns	7	7	0	.500	4–2	7–4	286	265	W1
Pittsburgh Steelers	5	9	0	.357	3–3	5–6	210	272	L3
Houston Oilers	3	10	1	.231	2–4	3–7–1	217	352	L3

Note: Tie games were not officially counted in the standings until 1972.
