= 1971 Houston Oilers season =

NFL team season

- Owner: Bud Adams
- General manager: John W. Breen
- Head coach: Ed Hughes
- Home stadium: Houston Astrodome

Results
- Record: 4–9–1
- Division place: 3rd AFC Central
- Playoffs: Did not qualify
- Pro Bowlers: FS Ken Houston

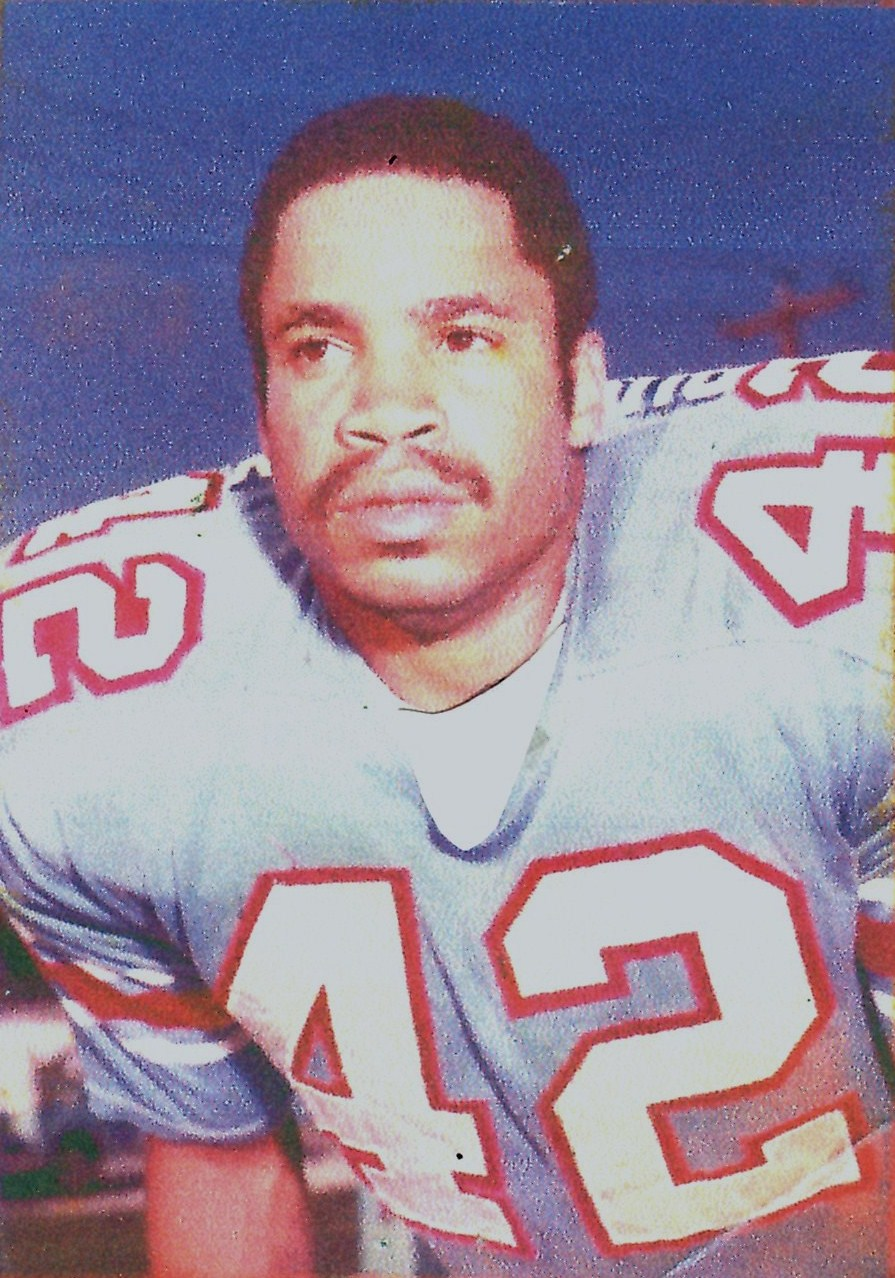
Andy Hopkins of the Houston Oilers, 1971

The 1971 Houston Oilers season was the team's 12th season, and second with the National Football League. The Oilers improved on their previous season's output of three victories, winning four games in 1971. They missed the playoffs for the second consecutive season.

Cleveland Browns business manager Bob Brodhead was named general manager of the Oilers on February 13, 1971. He resigned 50 days later and returned to the Browns. Director of player personnel John W. Breen was promoted to GM on May 5.

The 1971 Oilers are the only team in NFL history to throw three-or-more interceptions in ten different games. (The team was 2–7–1 in those games.)

One of the only bright spots was fifth year safety Ken Houston. Houston, who had the best season of his career, snagged 9 interceptions for 220 yards and 4 touchdowns (all career highs).

== Offseason ==
=== NFL draft ===
1971 Houston Oilers draft
| Round | Pick | Player | Position | College | Notes |
| 1 | 3 | Dan Pastorini * | Quarterback | Santa Clara | |
| 3 | 56 | Lynn Dickey | Quarterback | Kansas State | |
Made roster * Made at least one Pro Bowl during career

== Roster ==
1971 Houston Oilers roster
| Quarterbacks (QB): 10 Lynn Dickey; 12 Charley Johnson; 7 Dan Pastorini P; Running backs (RB): 35 Woody Campbell; 36 Robert Holmes; 28 Andy Hopkins; 2 Dickie Post; 32 Ward Walsh; Wide receivers (WR): 81 Jim Beirne; 00 Ken Burrough; 87 Linzy Cole; 84 Mac Haik; 18 Charlie Joiner; Tight ends (TE): 89 Alvin Reed | Offensive linemen (OL): 74 Gene Ferguson T; 66 Tom Funchess G/T; 75 Elbert Drungo G; 60 Tom Regner G; 62 Jerry Sturm C; 76 Walter Suggs C/T; 77 Sam Walton T; 56 Bob Young G; Defensive linemen (DL): 88 Allen Aldridge DE; 65 Elvin Bethea DE; 82 Ron Billingsley DT; 79 Pat Holmes DE; 78 Mike Tilleman DT | Linebackers (LB): 52 Garland Boyette MLB; 59 Phil Croyle OLB; 37 Dave Olerich MLB; 58 Ron Pritchard OLB; 85 Floyd Rice OLB; 90 George Webster OLB; Defensive backs (DB): 19 Willie Alexander CB; 48 Bob Atkins CB/S; 25 John Charles FS; 45 Leroy Howard CB; 29 Ken Houston SS; 22 Zeke Moore CB; Special teams (ST): 11 Mark Moseley K | Practice squad: 33 Benny Johnson CB; 24 Mike Richardson RB; 41 Leroy Sledge RB; Reserve: 73 Leo Brooks DT (IR); -- Roy Hopkins RB (IR); 64 Ron Saul G (IR); Rookies in italics |

== Schedule ==
| Week | Date | Opponent | Result | Record | Venue | Attendance | Recap |
|---|---|---|---|---|---|---|---|
| 1 | September 19 | at **Cleveland Browns** | **L** 0–31 | 0–1 | Cleveland Stadium | 73,387 | Recap |
| 2 | September 26 | Kansas City Chiefs | **L** 16–20 | 0–2 | Houston Astrodome | 46,498 | Recap |
| 3 | October 3 | New Orleans Saints | **T** 13–13 | 0–2–1 | Houston Astrodome | 47,966 | Recap |
| 4 | October 10 | at Washington Redskins | **L** 13–22 | 0–3–1 | RFK Stadium | 53,041 | Recap |
| 5 | October 17 | Detroit Lions | **L** 7–31 | 0–4–1 | Houston Astrodome | 45,885 | Recap |
| 6 | October 24 | at **Pittsburgh Steelers** | **L** 16–23 | 0–5–1 | Three Rivers Stadium | 45,872 | Recap |
| 7 | October 31 | **Cincinnati Bengals** | **W** 10–6 | 1–5–1 | Houston Astrodome | 37,947 | Recap |
| 8 | November 7 | at New England Patriots | **L** 20–28 | 1–6–1 | Schaefer Stadium | 53,155 | Recap |
| 9 | November 14 | at Oakland Raiders | **L** 21–41 | 1–7–1 | Oakland–Alameda County Coliseum | 54,705 | Recap |
| 10 | November 21 | at **Cincinnati Bengals** | **L** 13–28 | 1–8–1 | Riverfront Stadium | 59,390 | Recap |
| 11 | November 28 | **Cleveland Browns** | **L** 24–37 | 1–9–1 | Houston Astrodome | 37,921 | Recap |
| 12 | December 5 | **Pittsburgh Steelers** | **W** 29–3 | 2–9–1 | Houston Astrodome | 37,778 | Recap |
| 13 | December 12 | at Buffalo Bills | **W** 20–14 | 3–9–1 | War Memorial Stadium | 28,107 | Recap |
| 14 | December 19 | San Diego Chargers | **W** 49–33 | 4–9–1 | Houston Astrodome | 35,959 | Recap |
Note: Intra-division opponents are in **bold** text.

== Standings ==
AFC Central
| | W | L | T | PCT | DIV | CONF | PF | PA | STK |
|---|---|---|---|---|---|---|---|---|---|
| Cleveland Browns | 9 | 5 | 0 | .643 | 5–1 | 7–4 | 285 | 273 | W5 |
| Pittsburgh Steelers | 6 | 8 | 0 | .429 | 4–2 | 5–6 | 246 | 292 | L1 |
| Houston Oilers | 4 | 9 | 1 | .308 | 2–4 | 4–7 | 251 | 330 | W3 |
| Cincinnati Bengals | 4 | 10 | 0 | .286 | 1–5 | 3–8 | 284 | 265 | L3 |

Note: Tie games were not officially counted in the standings until 1972.
