= 1972 Houston Oilers season =

NFL team season

- Owner: Bud Adams
- General manager: John W. Breen
- Head coach: Bill Peterson
- Home stadium: Houston Astrodome

Results
- Record: 1–13
- Division place: 4th AFC Central
- Playoffs: Did not qualify
- Pro Bowlers: DE Elvin Bethea; S Ken Houston

The 1972 Houston Oilers season was their 13th season overall and third with the league. The team failed to improve on their previous season's output of 4–9–1, winning only one game. They missed the playoffs for the third consecutive season.

The low point of the season came in week four, a 34–0 loss on Monday Night Football to the Oakland Raiders. With the game out of hand, ABC cameras panned the stands at the Astrodome and found a man who appeared to be sleeping. When he realized the camera was on him, he shot the finger at the camera. When the camera discovered the sleeping fan, Howard Cosell intoned, “Right there, is a vivid picturization of the excitement...”. Don Meredith shot back when the fan flipped the bird, “They’re number one in the nation!”.

Perhaps another low point for the Oilers was the final game of the season against the Cincinnati Bengals. The Oilers lost that game by a score of 61–17, the worst loss for the team in its history up to that point; exactly 17 years later, the Oilers lost 61–7 to the Bengals in Cincinnati to shatter that dubious mark. The 61 points were the second most points any NFL team had ever allowed since the merger, one fewer than the Philadelphia Eagles allowed to the New York Giants three weeks earlier (final score of 62-10).

Coincidentally, the Eagles defeated the Oilers 18–17 in the Astrodome despite not scoring a touchdown, with Tom Dempsey connecting on six field goals. Ultimately, this loss in particular gave the Oilers the #1 pick in the 1973 NFL Draft, as Philadelphia finished 2-11-1, tied for the second worst record with the New Orleans Saints.

After their win over the New York Jets 26–20 in week 3 (one week after Joe Namath threw for 496 yards and six touchdowns to defeat the Baltimore Colts), the Oilers did not win another game until week 8 of next season, when they shocked the Baltimore Colts 31–27 on the road. Sandwiched between these two games was an 18-game losing streak, which was an NFL record at the time; it was eclipsed by the 0–26 start experienced by the Tampa Bay Buccaneers in 1976 and 1977.

== Offseason ==
=== NFL draft ===
1972 Houston Oilers draft
Round	Pick	Player	Position	College	Notes
1	6	Greg Sampson	Offensive tackle	Stanford	
Made roster

== Roster ==
1972 Houston Oilers roster
Quarterbacks (QB): 12 Ed Baker; 14 Kent Nix; 7 Dan Pastorini P; Running backs (RB): 30 Hoyle Granger; 15 Al Johnson; 40 Lewis Jolley; 18 Paul Robinson; 34 Willie Rodgers; 21 Fred Willis; Wide receivers (WR): 00 Ken Burrough; 20 Rhett Dawson; 87 Dave Smith; Tight ends (TE): 89 Alvin Reed	Offensive linemen (OL): 63 Levert Carr T; 69 Solomon Freelon G; 66 Tom Funchess T; 61 Wally Highsmith T; 50 Guy Murdock C; 67 Ralph Miller G; 60 Tom Regner G; 64 Ron Saul G; Defensive linemen (DL): 88 Allen Aldridge DE; 65 Elvin Bethea DE; 82 Ron Billingsley DT; 73 Leo Brooks DT; 79 Pat Holmes DE; 77 Council Rudolph DE; 91 Greg Sampson DT; 78 Mike Tilleman DT	Linebackers (LB): 52 Garland Boyette MLB; 55 Rich Lewis OLB; 85 Floyd Rice OLB; 56 Guy Roberts OLB; Defensive backs (DB): 19 Willie Alexander CB; 48 Bob Atkins FS; 25 John Charles FS; 29 Ken Houston SS; 33 Benny Johnson CB; 42 Jim Tolbert CB; Special teams (ST): 2 Skip Butler K	Practice squad: -- Jim Bishop TE; -- Kent Branstetter T; 72 Sam Holden G/T; 22 Zeke Moore CB; 80 John Nelson TE; -- Warren Wells WR; Reserve: 81 Jim Beirne WR (IR); 57 Richard Cheek G (IR); 59 Phil Croyle LB (IR); 10 Lynn Dickey QB (IR); 75 Elbert Drungo G (IR); 70 Jim Harvey G (IR); 51 Calvin Hunt C (IR); 71 Bob Wells T (IR); Rookies in italics

== Regular season ==
=== Preseason ===
Week	Date	Opponent	Result	Record
1	August 5	at Dallas Cowboys	**L** 24–26	0–1
2	August 10	Chicago Bears	**L** 17–20	0–2
3	August 19	Green Bay Packers	**W** 20–3	1–2
4	August 24	St. Louis Cardinals	**W** 33–24	2–2
5	September 4	at Minnesota Vikings	**L** 14–26	2–3
6	September 10	New Orleans Saints	**T** 14–14	2–3–1

=== Schedule ===
Week	Date	Opponent	Result	Record	Venue	Attendance
1	September 17	at Denver Broncos	**L** 17–30	0–1	Mile High Stadium	51,656
2	September 24	at Miami Dolphins	**L** 13–34	0–2	Miami Orange Bowl	77,821
3	October 1	New York Jets	**W** 26–20	1–2	Astrodome	51,423
4	October 9	Oakland Raiders	**L** 0–34	1–3	Astrodome	51,378
5	October 15	at **Pittsburgh Steelers**	**L** 7–24	1–4	Three Rivers Stadium	42,929
6	October 22	**Cleveland Browns**	**L** 17–23	1–5	Astrodome	38,113
7	October 29	at Cincinnati Bengals	**L** 7–30	1–6	Riverfront Stadium	59,409
8	November 5	at Cleveland Browns	**L** 0–20	1–7	Cleveland Municipal Stadium	61,985
9	November 12	Philadelphia Eagles	**L** 17–18	1–8	Astrodome	34,175
10	November 19	Green Bay Packers	**L** 10–23	1–9	Astrodome	41,752
11	November 26	at San Diego Chargers	**L** 20–34	1–10	San Diego Stadium	46,289
12	December 3	at Atlanta Falcons	**L** 10–20	1–11	Atlanta Stadium	58,850
13	December 10	Pittsburgh Steelers	**L** 3–9	1–12	Astrodome	36,528
14	December 17	Cincinnati Bengals	**L** 17–61	1–13	Astrodome	32,482
Note: Intra-division opponents are in **bold** text.

=== Standings ===
AFC Central
	W	L	T	PCT	DIV	CONF	PF	PA	STK
Pittsburgh Steelers	11	3	0	.786	4–2	9–2	343	175	W4
Cleveland Browns	10	4	0	.714	5–1	9–2	268	249	W2
Cincinnati Bengals	8	6	0	.571	3–3	6–5	299	229	W1
Houston Oilers	1	13	0	.071	0–6	1–10	164	380	L11

=== Game summaries ===
==== Week 4: Oakland Raiders ====
Week Four: Oakland Raiders at Houston Oilers – Game summary

Quarter	1	2	3	4	Total
**Raiders**	3	7	3	21	**34**
Oilers	0	0	0	0	**0**

at Houston Astrodome, Houston, Texas

- Date: October 9
- Game time: 9:00 p.m. CDT/7:00 p.m. PDT
- TV announcers (ABC): Howard Cosell, Don Meredith and Frank Gifford
- Game Log

Game information

**First quarter**

- OAK – George Blanda 46-yard field goal. Raiders 3–0.

**Second quarter**

- OAK – Fred Biletnikoff 16-yard pass from Daryle Lamonica (George Blanda kick), 0:09. Raiders 10–0.

**Third quarter**

- OAK – George Blanda 35-yard field goal. Raiders 13–0.

**Fourth quarter**

- OAK – Mike Siani 27-yard pass from Daryle Lamonica (George Blanda kick). Raiders 20–0.
- OAK – Clarence Davis 14-yard run (George Blanda kick). Raiders 27–0.
- OAK – Bob Moore 1-yard pass from Ken Stabler. Raiders 34–0.

**Top passers**

- OAK – Daryle Lamonica – 12/26, 166 yards, 2 TD
- HOU – Dan Pastorini – 3/21, 31 yards, 4 INT

**Top rushers**

- OAK – Marv Hubbard – 14 rushes, 73 yards
- HOU – Robert Holmes – 3 rushes, 37 yards

**Top receivers**

- OAK – Fred Biletnikoff – 6 receptions, 94 yards, 1 TD
- HOU – Jim Beirne – 1 reception, 19 yards

Despite the Oilers finishing with an astounding -1 yard in net passing, this week four game on Monday Night Football had a more competitive beginning than the results showed, as Houston played strong defense early in the game. With Oakland leading just 3–0 in the first half, the Oilers had two takeaways deep in Raiders territory, but failed to score points each time. In the first quarter, Oakland's George Atkinson bobbled a punt catch right into the hands of Houston's Willie Rodgers. Rodgers took it to the end zone, but the play was brought back to the spot of the turnover, as a muffed punt recovery cannot be advanced in NFL rules. The Oilers advanced into field goal range after taking over, but were stopped there when the Raiders got away with blatantly holding TE Alvin Reed on third down. Houston tried a fake field goal, but still were left scoreless when it failed. On their ensuing drive, Oakland was forced to punt, but the Oilers blocked it on the first play of the second quarter and recovered near the goal line. Again they were held scoreless when Dan Pastorini was lifted very high into the air on a remarkable defensive play on first down, and sacked back at the 17-yard line by Gus Otto on second down. The Raiders blocked the following field goal attempt even though the placehold was only at the 29-yard line.

The trading of turnovers continued through the second quarter, as promising Raiders rookie Cliff Branch fumbled the ball away across midfield. The Oilers got into field goal range again, only to be intercepted just outside the red zone on a tipped pass over the defensive line. After trading punts a few times, Pastorini threw another interception just before halftime. The Raiders took over at the Oilers' 16-yard line with nine seconds left in the half, but scored on first down as Daryle Lamonica found Fred Biletnikoff in the right corner of the end zone for a 10–0 lead.

The first half ended on a suitably bizarre kickoff by the Raiders that hit an Oilers player at mid-field and ricocheted back to Raiders territory. Oakland gained possession, but no time remained.

The miscues kept coming in the second half. First the Oilers nearly botched receiving the second half kickoff, then the Raiders forced them to punt, only for the Raiders to muff the punt and give possession back to the Oilers. Their drive ended with the third blocked field goal of the game, which was downed all the way back at the Oilers 23-yard line. The Raiders added a field goal with this possession.

Finally, the Raiders turned the game into a blowout in the fourth quarter with touchdown passes by both Daryle Lamonica and Ken Stabler and a rushing TD by Clarence Davis. However, to the very end, neither team played a clean game. By the time it was 27–0 and Houston backup Kent Nix was put in, Houston had thrown four interceptions, Oakland had committed four fumbles, and the teams had three blocked field goals and a blocked punt combined. Nix promptly added a fifth interception upon entering the game, when his receiver stumbled. By the time of Houston's final possession, a fan was caught shooting the middle finger at the camera on the MNF broadcast.
