= 1968 Houston Oilers season =

NFL team season

- Owner: Bud Adams
- General manager: Don Klosterman
- Head coach: Wally Lemm
- Home stadium: Houston Astrodome

Results
- Record: 7–7
- Division place: 2nd AFL Eastern
- Playoffs: Did not qualify

The 1968 Houston Oilers season was the ninth season for the Houston Oilers as a professional AFL franchise; The team would play their home games in the Houston Astrodome. The Oilers would become the first team in professional football to play their games in a domed stadium. The Oilers finished their season with a record of 7–7 and did not qualify for the playoffs.

== Offseason ==
=== AFL draft ===
1968 Houston Oilers draft
Round	Pick	Player	Position	College	Notes
2	42	Mac Haik	Wide receiver	Ole Miss	
3	77	Elvin Bethea * ^{†}	Defensive end	North Carolina A&T	
4	105	Jim Beirne *	Wide receiver	Purdue	
5	133	Bob Longo	Wide receiver	Pittsburgh	
7	187	Paul Toscano	Defensive back	Wyoming	
Made roster † Pro Football Hall of Fame * Made at least one Pro Bowl during career

== Roster ==
1968 Houston Oilers roster
Quarterbacks: 11 Pete Beathard; 10 Don Trull; Running backs: 42 Sid Blanks; 35 Woody Campbell; 32 Hoyle Granger; 36 Roy Hopkins; Wide receivers: 27 Glenn Bass; 81 Jim Beirne; 28 Charley Frazier; 84 Mac Haik; Tight ends: 82 Jim LeMoine; 89 Alvin Reed	Offensive linemen: 66 Sonny Bishop G; 78 Glen Ray Hines T; 50 Bobby Maples C; 54 Steve Quinn C; 60 Tom Regner G; 73 Bob Robertson T; 76 Walter Suggs T; 64 Dick Swatland G; Defensive linemen: 65 Elvin Bethea DE; 80 Gary Cutsinger DE; 59 Tom Domres DT; 79 Pat Holmes DE; 77 Bud Marshall DT; 74 Willie Parker DT	Linebackers: 58 Pete Barnes OLB; 52 Garland Boyette MLB; 55 Marion Rushing OLB; 68 Rich Stotter MLB; 56 Olen Underwood OLB; 90 George Webster OLB; Defensive backs: 41 Larry Carwell CB; 20 Miller Farr CB; 33 W. K. Hicks FS/CB; 29 Ken Houston SS; 22 Zeke Moore CB; 43 Jim Norton P/FS; 23 Bob Smith SS; Special teams: 15 Wayne Walker K	Reserve lists: -- Billy Alsbrooks CB (Military); 88 Ed Carrington TE (IR); 46 Jim Dousay RB (IR); 85 Bill Halley TE (IR); 72 George Rice DT (IR); 70 Carel Stith DT (IR); Taxi squad: 25 Ode Burrell RB; 51 Ronnie Caveness LB; 12 Bob Davis QB; 26 Larry Elkins WR; 21 Pete Johns S; 75 Dudley Meredith DT; 87 Lionel Taylor WR; 67 John Wittenborn K; rookies in italics

== Season schedule ==
Week	Date	Opponent	Result	Record	Venue	Attendance	Recap
1	September 9	Kansas City Chiefs	**L** 21–26	0–1	Houston Astrodome	45,083	Recap
2	September 14	at **Miami Dolphins**	**W** 24–10	1–1	Miami Orange Bowl	40,067	Recap
3	September 21	at San Diego Chargers	**L** 14–30	1–2	San Diego Stadium	46,217	Recap
4	September 29	Oakland Raiders	**L** 15–24	1–3	Houston Astrodome	46,098	Recap
5	October 6	**Miami Dolphins**	**L** 7–24	1–4	Houston Astrodome	36,109	Recap
6	October 13	at **Boston Patriots**	**W** 16–0	2–4	Fenway Park	32,502	Recap
7	October 20	**New York Jets**	**L** 14–20	2–5	Houston Astrodome	51,710	Recap
8	October 27	at **Buffalo Bills**	**W** 30–7	3–5	War Memorial Stadium	34,339	Recap
9	November 3	at Cincinnati Bengals	**W** 27–17	4–5	Nippert Stadium	24,012	Recap
10	November 10	at **New York Jets**	**L** 7–26	4–6	Shea Stadium	60,242	Recap
11	November 17	Denver Broncos	**W** 38–17	5–6	Houston Astrodome	36,075	Recap
12	Bye						
13	November 28	at Kansas City Chiefs	**L** 10–24	5–7	Municipal Stadium	48,493	Recap
14	December 7	**Buffalo Bills**	**W** 35–6	6–7	Houston Astrodome	34,110	Recap
15	December 15	**Boston Patriots**	**W** 45–17	7–7	Houston Astrodome	34,198	Recap
Note: Intra-division opponents are in **bold** text.

== Standings ==
AFL Eastern Division
	W	L	T	PCT	DIV	PF	PA	STK
New York Jets	11	3	0	.786	7–1	419	280	W4
Houston Oilers	7	7	0	.500	5–3	303	248	W2
Miami Dolphins	5	8	1	.385	4–3–1	276	355	L1
Boston Patriots	4	10	0	.286	2–6	229	406	L2
Buffalo Bills	1	12	1	.077	1–6–1	199	367	L8

Note: Tie games were not officially counted in the standings in the AFL.

=== Notable Stats ===
Player	Comp.	Att.	Comp%	Yards	TD's	INT's
