= 1967 Houston Oilers season =

NFL team season

- Owner: Bud Adams
- General manager: Don Klosterman
- Head coach: Wally Lemm
- Home stadium: Rice Stadium

Results
- Record: 9–4–1
- Division place: 1st AFL Eastern
- Playoffs: Lost AFL Championship (at Raiders) 7–40

The 1967 Houston Oilers season was the eighth season for the Houston Oilers as a professional AFL franchise; The team improved on their previous output of 3–11, with a 9–4–1 record. They won the Eastern Division and qualified for the postseason for the first time in five seasons, but lost to the Raiders in the AFL Championship Game at Oakland.

== Offseason ==
=== AFL draft ===
1967 Houston Oilers draft
Round	Pick	Player	Position	College	Notes
1	5	George Webster *	Linebacker	Michigan State	
1	23	Tom Regner	Guard	Notre Dame	
2	30	Bob Davis	Quarterback	Virginia	
3	56	Larry Carwell	Cornerback	Iowa State	
Made roster * Made at least one Pro Bowl during career

=== Undrafted free agents ===
1967 undrafted free agents of note
Player	Position	College
Joe Tuths	Guard	Columbia

== Roster ==
1967 Houston Oilers roster
Quarterbacks (QB): 14 Billy Anderson; 11 Pete Beathard; 12 Bob Davis; Running backs (RB): 42 Sid Blanks; 35 Woody Campbell; 32 Hoyle Granger; 36 Roy Hopkins; Wide receivers (WR): 27 Glenn Bass; 25 Ode Burrell; 28 Charley Frazier; 87 Lionel Taylor; Tight ends (TE): 88 Bob Poole; 89 Alvin Reed	Offensive linemen (OL): 66 Sonny Bishop G; 78 Glen Ray Hines T; 50 Bobby Maples C; 60 Tom Regner G; 70 Carel Stith T; 76 Walter Suggs T; 61 Bob Talamini G; Defensive linemen (DL): 75 Don Floyd DE; 79 Pat Holmes DE; 77 Bud Marshall DE; 74 Willie Parker DT; 80 Andy Rice DT; 72 George Rice DT	Linebackers (LB): 58 Pete Barnes OLB; 52 Garland Boyette MLB; 85 Danny Brabham OLB; 51 Ronnie Caveness MLB; 56 Olen Underwood OLB; 90 George Webster OLB; Defensive backs (DB): 20 Miller Farr CB; 33 W. K. Hicks CB; 29 Ken Houston SS; 23 Bobby Jancik SS; 21 Pete Johns FS; 22 Zeke Moore CB; 43 Jim Norton FS/P; Special teams (ST): 67 John Wittenborn K	Practice squad: 73 George Allen DT; 44 Ed Carrington TE; 45 Dennis Duncan RB; 26 Larry Elkins WR; 40 Ben Hart TE; 84 Charles Lockhart WR; 62 Ed Marcontell C/G; 68 George Merchant T; 83 Richard Stebbins WR; 34 Theo Viltz CB; Reserve: 30 Johnny Brunson RB (IR); 41 Larry Carwell CB (IR); -- Gary Cutsinger DE (IR); 57 Marvin McQueen LB Military; Rookies in italics

== Schedule ==
Week	Date	Opponent	Result	Record	Venue	Attendance	Recap
1	Bye						
2	September 9	Kansas City Chiefs	**L** 20–25	0–1	Rice Stadium	28,003	Recap
3	September 17	at **Buffalo Bills**	**W** 20–3	1–1	War Memorial Stadium	41,384	Recap
4	September 24	at San Diego Chargers	**L** 3–13	1–2	San Diego Stadium	36,032	Recap
5	October 1	Denver Broncos	**W** 10–6	2–2	Rice Stadium	21,798	Recap
6	Bye						
7	October 15	at **New York Jets**	**T** 28–28	2–2–1	Shea Stadium	62,729	Recap
8	October 22	at Kansas City Chiefs	**W** 24–19	3–2–1	Municipal Stadium	46,365	Recap
9	October 29	**Buffalo Bills**	**W** 10–3	4–2–1	Rice Stadium	30,060	Recap
10	November 5	at **Boston Patriots**	**L** 7–18	4–3–1	Fenway Park	19,422	Recap
11	November 12	at Denver Broncos	**W** 20–18	5–3–1	Bears Stadium	30,392	Recap
12	Bye						
13	November 26	**Boston Patriots**	**W** 27–6	6–3–1	Rice Stadium	28,044	Recap
14	December 3	**Miami Dolphins**	**W** 17–14	7–3–1	Rice Stadium	20,979	Recap
15	December 10	Oakland Raiders	**L** 7–19	7–4–1	Rice Stadium	36,375	Recap
16	December 16	San Diego Chargers	**W** 24–17	8–4–1	Rice Stadium	19,870	Recap
17	December 23	at **Miami Dolphins**	**W** 41–10	9–4–1	Miami Orange Bowl	25,982	Recap
Note: Intra-division opponents are in **bold** text.

== Game summaries ==
=== Week 16 ===
Team	1	2	3	4	Total
• Oilers	7	7	17	10	41
Dolphins	0	3	7	0	10

- Date: December 23
- Location: Orange Bowl

== Playoffs ==
Round	Date	Opponent	Result	Venue	Attendance	Recap
AFL Championship	December 31	at Oakland Raiders	L 7–40	Oakland–Alameda County Coliseum	53,330	Recap

== Standings ==
AFL Eastern Division
	W	L	T	PCT	DIV	PF	PA	STK
Houston Oilers	9	4	1	.692	5–1–1	258	199	W2
New York Jets	8	5	1	.615	5–1–1	371	329	W1
Buffalo Bills	4	10	0	.286	3–5	237	285	L1
Miami Dolphins	4	10	0	.286	2–6	219	407	L1
Boston Patriots	3	10	1	.231	3–5	280	389	L5

Note: Tie games were not officially counted in the standings in the AFL.
