= Alvin Reed =

American football player (born 1944)

No. 89, 88
- Position: Tight end

Personal information
- Born: August 1, 1944 (age 82); Kilgore, Texas, U.S.
- Listed height: 6 ft 5 in (1.96 m)
- Listed weight: 235 lb (107 kg)

Career information
- High school: C.B. Dansby (Kilgore)
- College: Prairie View A&M
- NFL draft: 1967: undrafted

Career history
- Houston Oilers (1967-1972); Washington Redskins (1973–1975)

Awards and highlights
- 2× First-team All-AFL (1968, 1969); 2× AFL All-Star (1968, 1969)

Career NFL/AFL statistics
- Receptions: 214
- Receiving yards: 2,983
- Touchdowns: 14
- Stats at Pro Football Reference

Alvin D. Reed (born August 1, 1944) is an American former professional football player who was a tight end in the American Football League (AFL) and National Football League (NFL). The 6 ft 5 in (1.96 m) 232 lb (105.2 kg) tight end from Prairie View A&M University was signed as a free agent by the AFL's Houston Oilers in 1967. Reed played nine seasons in professional football, from 1967 to 1975.

== Early life ==
Reed was born on August 1, 1944, in Kilgore, Texas. He was one of Vesta Mae Loyd's eight children from two marriages. His maternal grandfather Virgil Lacy was the biggest influence in Reed's life, after his mother. The family was extremely poor, and his mother did maid work and took in washing and ironing to feed her family. He did not attend school one year for lack of adequate clothing. Reed attended C. B. Dansby High School in Kilgore, where he was a star lineman on offense and defense for the football team. Dansby was a segregated school, and was originally called Kilgore Colored High School until 1956, ceasing operations after the local high schools integrated in 1970.

Reed also was a leading scorer on the school's basketball team, and a champion member of its track team. In the 1962-63 season, he led Dansby and the district in scoring (18.8 points per game on the season and 18 points per game in district games), and was named to the District 3-AAA All-Star basketball team. In 1961, he was first in the district and the state in the shot put. He also received a science fair award in biology during high school, as well as an award for singing in the high school octet.

== College career ==
Reed attended Prairie View A&M University on a football scholarship, and was able to make it through college with those funds and financial help from his grandfather. He studied industrial education, with a major in drafting. As a freshman in 1963, he started on the defensive line at left end for Prairie View. His teammates included future American Football League (AFL) and National Football League (NFL) All-Pro receiver Otis Taylor and future Hall of Fame defensive back Ken Houston. Their 1963 team reached the NAIA (National Association of Intercollegiate Athletics) championship game, losing to St. John's of Minnesota in the Camelia Bowl, 33–27.

In 1964, Reed played end, and also served as the team's placekicker. He was used as an offensive end during that season. Reed became a full time tight end during his junior and senior years, but was seldom a pass receiving target; Otis Taylor being the principal pass receiver. As a senior in 1966, Reed, now a 6 ft 4 in (1.93 m) 230 lb (104.3 kg) receiver, was named one of Prairie View's three captains.

== Professional career ==
=== Houston Oilers ===
Reed was not drafted in 1967, and signed as a free agent with the Houston Oilers in March 1967. The Oilers' Tom Williams had convinced Reed to try out for the team. Houston's director of player personnel, Charley Hall, stated that Reed went undrafted because few passes were thrown to him in college and Reed did not demonstrate a facility for catching passes or running with a smooth gait as a receiver. However, Reed was a determined and hard worker, with a great desire to improve; and Oilers' receiver coach Hugh Devore and veteran receiver Lionel Taylor put in extra time with Reed to improve his skills. Later in his career, after being traded from the Oilers, Reed expressed his gratitude to Oilers' coach Wally Lemm for giving Reed the opportunity to play in his first season.

Reed made the team as a tight end, and started eight games in 1967, with 11 receptions for 144 yards. The Oilers lost the 1967 AFL Championship Game to the Oakland Raiders, 40–7; with Reed catching four passes for 60 yards.

In 1968, Reed started 13 games at tight end, with 46 receptions for 747 yards and five touchdowns. He was eighth in the AFL in receiving yards and ninth in receptions. He was second to Jim Whalen of the Boston Patriots for most receptions by a tight end. Reed was selected to play in the 1968 All-Star game. He was named first-team All-AFL by The Sporting News and second-team All-AFL by the Associated Press (AP) and United Press International (UPI).

Reed was an All-Star again in 1969, the last season before the AFL-NFL merger. The Sporting News again named him first-team All-AFL at tight end, and the AP, UPI and Newspaper Enterprise Association (NEA), among other entities, named him second-team All-AFL. He started all 14 games, with a career-high 51 receptions for 664 yards and two touchdowns. He was fourth in the AFL in receptions that season, and led all AFL tight ends in receptions. The Oilers lost in the divisional round of the playoffs to the Oakland Raiders, 56–7, with Reed scoring the only Oilers' touchdown, and catching a team-leading seven passes for 81 yards.

In 1970, Reed started 13 games for the Oilers, with 47 receptions for 604 yards and two touchdowns. His 47 receptions were tied for 10th best in the NFL. In 1971, he started 10 games and had 25 receptions; and in 1972, Reed started all 14 Oilers' games, with 19 receptions. The Oilers were, 3–10–1 in 1970, 4–9–1 in 1971 and 1–13 in 1972.

As an Oiler (1967–72), Reed had 199 receptions for 2,818 (14.2 yards per reception), and 11 receiving touchdowns.

=== Washington Redskins ===
The Oilers had selected Reed's Prairie View teammate Ken Houston with the ninth pick in the 1967 NFL draft, and Reed and Houston were teammates on the Oilers from 1967 to 1972. On May 15, 1972, Oilers general manager Sid Gillman traded Houston to the Washington Redskins and coach George Allen for five players and a draft choice. Two weeks later Gillman and Allen engineered a trade sending Reed to Washington for a draft pick. Reed and Houston would play three more years together in Washington (1973 to 1975).

In 1973, Reed was intended to serve as a backup to All Pro tight end Jerry Smith. However, when Smith suffered a preseason injury, Reed stepped in to start five games, and had nine receptions for 124 yards in those games. However, he suffered a knee injury that caused him to miss the season's final nine games. He played two more seasons for Washington (1974-75), but did not start any games. Reed had four receptions and one touchdown catch in 1974, and two receptions in 1975, both for touchdowns. Washington released him in late August 1976.

== NFL/AFL career statistics ==
Legend
	Led the league
**Bold**	Career high

=== Regular season ===
Year	Team	Games		Receiving				
Year	Team	GP	GS	Rec	Yds	Avg	Lng	TD
1967	HOU	14	8	11	144	13.1	20	1
1968	HOU	14	13	46	**747**	16.2	**60**	**5**
1969	HOU	14	14	**51**	664	13.0	43	2
1970	HOU	13	13	47	604	12.9	34	2
1971	HOU	14	10	25	408	**16.3**	36	1
1972	HOU	14	14	19	251	13.2	29	0
1973	WAS	5	5	9	124	13.8	34	0
1974	WAS	14	0	4	36	9.0	11	1
1975	WAS	14	0	2	5	2.5	4	2
		116	77	214	2,983	13.9	60	14

=== Playoffs ===
Year	Team	Games		Receiving				
Year	Team	GP	GS	Rec	Yds	Avg	Lng	TD
1967	HOU	1	1	4	60	**15.0**	**25**	0
1969	HOU	1	1	**7**	**81**	11.6	18	1
1974	WAS	1	0	0	0	0.0	0	0
		3	2	11	141	12.8	25	1

== Honors ==
In 1992, Reed was inducted into the Prairie View A&M University Sports Hall of Fame. In 1999, he was inducted into the Southwest Athletic Conference Hall of Fame.

== Personal life ==
During his time in Houston, Reed worked in the offseason for the Houston Skill Center, as a job training evaluator for those being trained in job skills. This included performing work for NASA.

== See also ==
- Other American Football League players
