= Don Trull =

American gridiron football player and coach (born 1941)

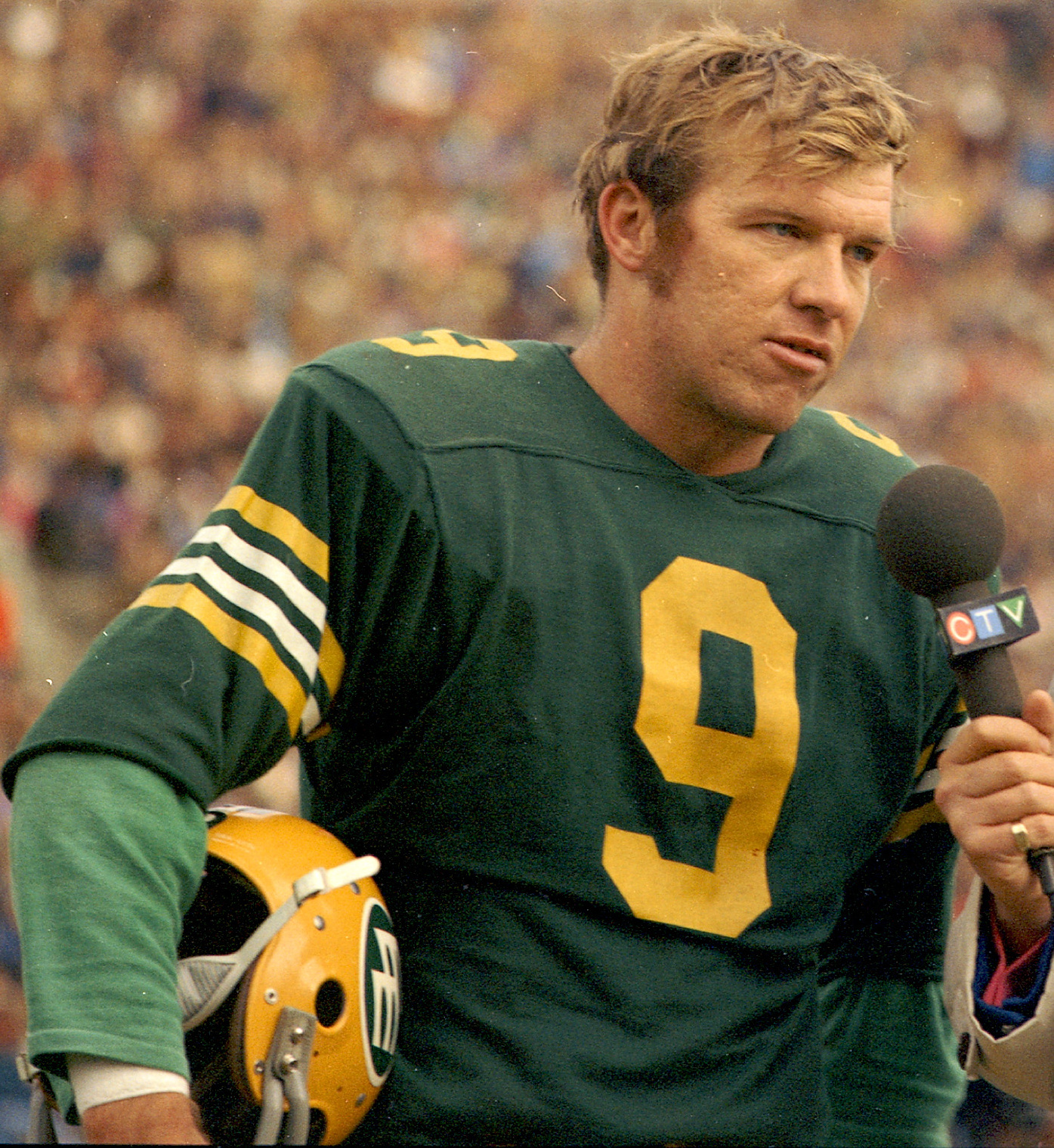
- Trull with the Edmonton Eskimos in 1970

No. 10, 9
- Position: Quarterback

Personal information
- Born: October 20, 1941 (age 85); Oklahoma City, Oklahoma, U.S.
- Listed height: 6 ft 1 in (1.85 m)
- Listed weight: 195 lb (88 kg)

Career information
- High school: Southeast (Oklahoma City)
- College: Baylor
- NFL draft: 1963: 9th round, 117th overall pick
- AFL draft: 1963: 14th round, 111th overall pick

Career history

Playing
- Houston Oilers (1963–1966); Boston Patriots (1967); Houston Oilers (1967–1969); Edmonton Eskimos (1970–1971); Houston Texans/Shreveport Steamer (1974)

Coaching
- Arkansas (1972) Assistant coach; Arkansas (1973) Wide receivers / quarterbacks coach; Houston Texans/Shreveport Steamer (1974) Quarterbacks coach

Awards and highlights
- 2× Sammy Baugh Trophy (1962, 1963); First-team All-American (1963); NCAA passing yards leader (1963); First-team All-SWC (1963); Second-team All-SWC (1962)

Career AFL statistics
- Passing attempts: 637
- Passing completions: 276
- Completion percentage: 43.3%
- TD–INT: 30–28
- Passing yards: 3,980
- Passer rating: 61.6
- Rushing yards: 428
- Rushing touchdowns: 14
- Stats at Pro Football Reference
- College Football Hall of Fame

Donald Dean Trull (born October 20, 1941) is an American former professional football player who was a quarterback in the American Football League (AFL). Trull played football collegiately at Baylor University, where he was an All-American and twice won the Sammy Baugh Trophy as the nation's top passer.

Trull finished fourth in the Heisman Trophy voting in 1963. In 2013, he was inducted into the College Football Hall of Fame.

== Career statistics ==
Legend
**Bold**	Career high

=== Regular season ===
Year	Team	Games			Passing									Rushing					Sacked		Fum
Year	Team	GP	GS	Record	Cmp	Att	Pct	Yds	Y/A	Lng	TD	Int	Rtg	Att	Yds	Y/A	Lng	TD	Sck	SckY	Fum
1964	HOU	**14**	1	0–1	36	86	41.9	439	5.1	36	1	2	52.4	12	42	3.5	15	0	10	94	2
1965	HOU	**14**	2	1–1	38	107	35.5	528	4.9	57	5	5	48.3	29	**145**	**5.0**	18	2	**20**	162	3
1966	HOU	**14**	**5**	0–5	**84**	**172**	48.8	**1,200**	7.0	**62**	**10**	5	79.1	**38**	139	3.7	**23**	**7**	17	**166**	3
1967	BOS	7	3	0–3	27	81	33.3	442	5.5	52	1	**7**	20.7	19	35	1.8	10	3	11	75	**4**
1967	HOU	3	0	—	4	11	36.4	38	3.5	16	0	0	46.8	3	−5	−1.7	7	0	2	18	0
1968	HOU	11	4	**3–1**	53	105	**50.5**	864	**8.2**	60	**10**	3	**98.3**	14	47	3.4	15	0	9	94	**4**
1969	HOU	**14**	3	0–1–2	34	75	45.3	469	6.3	57	3	6	45.9	8	25	3.1	7	2	11	85	1
Career		77	18	4–12–2	276	637	43.3	3,980	6.2	62	30	28	61.6	123	428	3.5	23	14	80	694	17

=== Postseason ===
Year	Team	Games			Passing									Rushing					Sacked		Fum
Year	Team	GP	GS	Record	Cmp	Att	Pct	Yds	Y/A	Lng	TD	Int	Rtg	Att	Yds	Y/A	Lng	TD	Sck	SckY	Fum
1969	HOU	**1**	**0**	—	**0**	**0**	—	**0**	—	**0**	**0**	**0**	—	**0**	**0**	—	**0**	**0**	**0**	**0**	**0**
Career		1	0	—	0	0	—	0	—	0	0	0	—	0	0	—	0	0	0	0	0

== See also ==
- List of American Football League players
- List of college football yearly passing leaders
