= Hoyle Granger =

American football player (born 1944)

No. 32, 30, 40
- Position: Running back

Personal information
- Born: March 7, 1944 (age 82); Oberlin, Louisiana, U.S.
- Listed height: 6 ft 1 in (1.85 m)
- Listed weight: 225 lb (102 kg)

Career information
- High school: Oberlin
- College: Mississippi State
- NFL draft: 1966: 4th round, 63rd overall pick
- AFL draft: 1966: 5th round, 37th overall pick

Career history
- Houston Oilers (1966-1970); New Orleans Saints (1971); Houston Oilers (1972)

Awards and highlights
- 2× AFL All-Star (1967, 1968); 2× Second-team All-SEC (1964, 1965)

Career NFL/AFL statistics
- Rushing yards: 3,653
- Rushing average: 4.5
- Receptions: 134
- Receiving yards: 1,339
- Total touchdowns: 24
- Stats at Pro Football Reference

Hoyle John Granger (/ɡrɑːnˈʒeɪ/ grahn-ZHAY; born March 7, 1944) is an American former professional football player who was a running back in the American Football League (AFL) from 1966 to 1969 and the National Football League (NFL) from 1970 to 1972. He played college football for the Mississippi State Bulldogs from 1963 to 1965, playing in the Southeastern Conference (SEC). He led the Bulldogs in rushing all three years, and was named second- or third-team All-SEC during each of those three years.

Granger was the first pick in the fifth round of the 1966 AFL draft by the Houston Oilers. He was an AFL All-Star in 1967 and 1968, and named second-team All-AFL both years. He led the Oilers in rushing from 1967 to 1969, and broke the team's season rushing record in 1967 when he gained nearly 1,200 yards rushing and led the AFL with 1,494 yards from scrimmage. Granger's continued success in the NFL was derailed by a season-ending knee injury during the fifth game of the 1970 season, and he was out of the NFL by the age of 28. He has been inducted into the Louisiana and Mississippi Sports Halls of Fame.

== Early life ==
Granger was born on March 7, 1944, in Oberlin, Louisiana. He was raised in a French-speaking Cajun community of 1,500 people in Evangeline, Louisiana, and grew up speaking French. He spoke French at home with his family in Oberlin throughout his life. His family was poor, owning a small farm. His father also worked as a barber.

Granger attended Oberlin High School where he played on the football (1958 to 1961) and basketball teams, and was a member of the track and field team. Granger worked on a farm before beginning his school day, and then again after football practice each day. Granger was a two-way player on the football team, playing in District 5-B, as a fullback on offense and tackle on defense. He played fullback at 205 lb (93 kg) for Oberlin as a sophomore in 1959, and scored seven touchdowns in one game that season.

He was a two-time Louisiana Class B All-State running back for Oberlin (1960 and 1961). As a 215 lb (97.5 kg) junior in 1960, Granger had 1,394 rushing yards on 115 carries (12.1 yards per carry), while scoring 139 points. In 1961, playing fullback, he rushed for 1,435 yards on 116 carries, averaging 12.5 yards per carry and scoring 199 points. He scored the most points in Southwest Louisiana high school football in 1961. He was reported to be 6 ft 1 in (1.85 m) 210 lb (95.3 kg) or 215 lb as a senior. Granger scored 454 points in total during his high school career.

Granger's Oberlin teams reached the championship game of Louisiana's high school Class B football playoffs each year from 1959 to 1961. Oberlin lost the championship to St. James High School in 1959 (19–6) and 1960 (21–7, with Granger scoring Oberlin's only touchdown); and won the 1961 Class B championship over Clinton High School, 34–13. In Oberlin's 1961 semifinal playoff win over Plain Dealing High School, Granger rushed for 79 yards on 15 carries, with one rushing touchdown, and returned a kickoff 76 yards for another touchdown. In the 1961 championship game, Granger rushed for one touchdown, passed for another, and ran for four extra points. This is Oberlin's only football state title to date. He was named the District 5-B outstanding player three times, and Louisiana's All-State outstanding Class B player in 1961. Oberlin did not lose a District game during Granger's time on the team.

In 1960, he was a second-team District 9–B all-star in basketball. He was also named a District Most Valuable Player in basketball at Oberlin. In April 1962, Granger won the 100-yard dash and the shot put at the Hardwood Relays. He was a Louisiana state shot put champion.

== College career ==
From his junior year in high school, Granger was scouted by Mississippi State University assistant football coach Henry Lee Parker. Hoyle chose to attend Mississippi State, where he played varsity football at running back for the Mississippi State Bulldogs in the Southeastern Conference (SEC), from 1963 to 1965. As a sophomore (1963), Granger led the Bulldogs with 481 rushing yards on 113 carries (the sixth most total rushing yards in the SEC that year), and had two rushing touchdowns. He had been used sparingly in two early season games because of injury. Despite that, Tulane University assistant coach, and future NFL coach, Bill Arnsparger said Granger was the best fullback he had ever seen in the SEC. The Associated Press (AP) and United Press International (UPI) named Granger third-team All-SEC in 1963. He was a unanimous choice for the AP's SEC all-sophomore team. The Bulldogs were 7–2–2 that season, and defeated North Carolina State in the Liberty Bowl, 16–12. Granger had 13 carries for 94 yards in the Liberty Bowl.

As a junior in 1964, Granger rushed for 604 yards on 129 carries (4.7 yards per carry), with two rushing touchdowns. He led the Bulldogs in rushing and was third in the SEC in total rushing yards and yards per carry average. He played a November game against Auburn with a pulled hamstring muscle, managing only 49 yards on 18 carries (2.7 yards per carry), after having gained 462 yards on his previous 85 carries (5.4 yards per carry). The AP and UPI both named Granger second-team All-SEC.

As a senior in 1965, he led the Bulldogs again with 449 rushing yards on 108 carries, and three rushing touchdowns; even though he had a bad ankle throughout the season. He also had seven pass receptions for 147 yards. He was eighth in the SEC that season in total yards from scrimmage. The AP named Granger second-team All-SEC in 1965, while UPI did not select a second team in 1965. In 1964 and 1965, Alabama's players voted Granger one of the three best running backs they played against in those seasons. After his senior season, he played in the 1965 Blue-Gray Game, and the January 1966 Senior Bowl.

Over his three-year career, Granger gained 1,534 rushing yards on 350 carries (4.4 yards per carry) with seven rushing touchdowns; and had ten receptions for 178 yards. Granger finished his career at Mississippi State third all-time on the school's rushing leaders list (behind Tom McWilliams and Blondy Black who played in the 1940s), and is now 26th (through 2025 among those playing from 1956 on). He was nicknamed "the Beast" at Mississippi State, though he was relatively mild mannered off of the football field.

== Professional career ==
Granger was drafted as the first pick of the fifth-round (37th overall) of the 1966 AFL draft by the Houston Oilers. The Baltimore Colts drafted Granger in the fourth round of the 1966 NFL draft, 63rd overall. The Oilers and personnel director John Breen had been scouting Granger since he was a sophomore at Mississippi State, finding him to be an excellent runner for power and speed, receiver, and blocker at fullback. The Oilers pursued him avidly after the draft, and he was particularly persuaded by his former Mississippi State teammates Johnny Baker and Ode Burrell who were already playing for the Oilers. Granger also chose to play in Houston as the team was closer to his Louisiana home, and to some extent because the Colts had peeved him with their recruiting efforts, especially when they awoke his over eight-month pregnant wife with a telephone call at 4:30 in the morning.

Oilers' head coach Wally Lemm thought Granger might be slow to learn the Oilers' offense as a rookie, waived Granger, and placed him on the taxi squad to begin the 1966 season. By at least the fourth week of the season, the Oilers brought him onto their roster, and had him play special teams. By early November, Lemm admitted that he had underestimated Granger, after Granger had a 69-yard touchdown run while playing as a reserve running back in the season's ninth game against the Oakland Raiders.

The Oilers began the 1966 season starting Charley Tolar and then John Henry Johnson at fullback. After the Raiders' game, Lemm gave Granger his first start at fullback the following week against the Boston Patriots (with Tolar at halfback). Granger had eight rushes for 24 yards and two receptions for 17 yards. Lemm continued starting Granger at fullback for the season's four remaining games. In a December 4 game against the San Diego Chargers, Granger had 183 yards in 19 carries. Granger played in 11 games that season, starting five. He rushed for 388 yards and one touchdown in his rookie season while also accounting for 104 receiving yards and one receiving touchdown. He averaged 6.9 yards per carry. The official AFL high in yards per carry that season was 5.4.

In Granger's second season, he began the year as the Oilers' starting fullback and had a break-out season, starting all 14 games in 1967. This was the best season of his professional career. He rushed the ball 236 times for 1,194 yards (5.1 yards per carry) and six touchdowns, plus 300 yards and three touchdowns receiving. Granger broke Charley Tolar's team record of 1,012 rushing yards set in 1962. Granger led the AFL in yards from scrimmage that season with 1,494, and was second in rushing yards, yards per carry, and all-purpose yards. He was named an AFL All-Star that year, and was selected second-team All-AFL by the AP, UPI and Newspaper Enterprise Association (NEA).

Granger was named an AFL All-Star again in 1968, and the NEA selected him second-team All-AFL. Astronaut Frank Borman expressed his happiness at Granger's selection to the All-Star team while Borman was in space during the Apollo 8 mission. Granger started 13 games, rushing for a team-leading 848 yards on 202 carries, with seven rushing touchdowns; while also gaining 361 yards on 26 receptions. Granger finished fourth in the league in rushing yards and total yards from scrimmage, and was tied for sixth in yards per carry.

Granger started 13 games again in 1969. He played with pulled hamstrings in both legs that never fully healed during the season. He again led the Oilers in rushing, with 740 yards on 186 carries. He had three touchdowns rushing, and gained 330 yards on 27 receptions with one touchdown receiving. He finished the season third in the AFL in total rushing yards and fourth in total yards from scrimmage. In 1970, Granger suffered a torn ligament in his left knee during the season's fifth game against the Pittsburgh Steelers, which put him out for the rest of the season. Some attributed the injury to the AstroTurf playing surface in the Houston Astrodome. He started five games that year before his season was lost to injury, rushing for 169 yards on 51 carries, with one rushing touchdown; and catching 11 passes for 118 yards.

In January 1971, the Oilers traded Granger, Terry Stoepel, Charlie Blossom, and a second round draft choice to the New Orleans Saints for Dave Rowe and Ken Burrough. At the time of the trade, Granger was the Oilers' all-time leading rusher with 3,339 yards. Granger started only four games for the Saints in 1972, with 139 rushing yards on 32 carries and one rushing touchdown. He also caught 12 passes for 52 yards. The Saints released Granger in late August 1972. He was signed by the Oilers two weeks later. He started five of the 13 games in which he appeared for the Oilers in 1972, but was in constant pain with an ankle injury that season (later determined to be an undiagnosed broken ankle). Granger had 175 rushing yards on 42 carries, and 15 receptions for 74 yards. This was his last season in the NFL. The Oilers waived him in March 1973.

In his seven-year AFL/NFL career, Granger had 3,653 rushing yards, averaging 4.5 yards per carry and 19 rushing touchdowns. He also had 96 receptions for 1,095 receiving yards and five receiving touchdowns. He accounted for 4,992 yards from scrimmage and 24 total touchdowns. He is the Oilers/Tennessee Titans' sixth all-time leading rusher with 3,514 yards (through 2025). He averaged 4.5 yards per carry as an Oiler, ranking third all-time among Oiler/Titan running backs with over 750 carries (behind only Derrick Henry and Chris Johnson through 2025).

In April 1974, Granger signed to play for the Houston Texans of the World Football League. However, he chose to retire before the season started and did not go on to play with the Texans.

== Legacy and honors ==
- Inducted to the Louisiana Sports Hall of Fame (2005)
- Inducted to the Mississippi Sports Hall of Fame (2008)
- Inducted to the Mississippi State University Athletic Hall of Fame (2008)
- Named Greatest Athlete Ever from Allen Parish, Louisiana by The Advocate (2017)
- Louisiana Class B All-State halfback (1960, 1961)
- Louisiana Class B Most Valuable Player (1961)
- Louisiana Class B State Champion (1961)
- All-SEC fullback (1963/third-team, 1964/second-team, 1965/second-team)
- AFL All-Star (1967, 1968)
- AFL yards from scrimmage leader (1968)
- Oilers/Tennessee Titans sixth all-time leading rusher (through 2025)

== Personal life ==
After retiring from professional football, Granger worked for decades in the oilfield business.

== NFL/AFL career statistics ==
Legend
	Led the league
**Bold**	Career high

Year	Team	Games		Rushing						Receiving					Fumbles	
Year	Team	GP	GS	Att	Yds	Avg	Y/G	Lng	TD	Rec	Yds	Avg	Lng	TD	Fum	FR
1966	HOU	11	4	56	388	**6.9**	35.3	**69**	1	12	104	8.7	26	1	0	0
1967	HOU	**14**	**14**	**236**	**1,194**	5.1	**85.3**	67	6	**31**	300	9.7	43	**3**	1	0
1968	HOU	13	13	202	848	4.2	65.2	47	**7**	26	**361**	**13.9**	**55**	0	**3**	**1**
1969	HOU	13	13	186	740	4.0	56.9	23	3	27	330	12.2	53	1	1	0
1970	HOU	5	5	51	169	3.3	33.8	15	1	11	118	10.7	22	0	2	**1**
1971	NO	**14**	4	32	139	4.3	9.9	16	1	12	52	4.3	11	0	1	**1**
1972	HOU	13	5	42	175	4.2	13.5	14	0	15	74	4.9	20	0	2	0
Career		83	58	805	3,653	4.5	44.0	69	19	134	1,339	10.0	55	5	10	3

== See also ==
- Other American Football League players
