= Claude Harvey =

American football player (born 1948)

- Harvey, 1973 Philadelphia Eagles Media Guide

No. 88
- Position: Linebacker

Personal information
- Born: March 27, 1948 (age 78); Willis, Texas, U.S.
- Listed height: 6 ft 4 in (1.93 m)
- Listed weight: 225 lb (102 kg)

Career information
- College: Prairie View A&M
- NFL draft: 1970: undrafted

Career history
- Houston Oilers (1970); Houston Oilers (1971)*; Philadelphia Eagles (1973)
- * Offseason or practice squad member only

Career NFL statistics
- Games played: 5
- Stats at Pro Football Reference

Claude Edward Harvey (born March 27, 1948) is an American former professional football player who was a linebacker for the Houston Oilers of the National Football League (NFL) in 1970. He played college football for the Prairie View A&M Panthers from 1966 to 1969.

== Early life ==
Harvey was born in Willis, Texas, in 1948. He attended A. R. Tuner High school.

== Prairie View ==
Harvey played college football for the Panthers at Prairie View A&M University from 1966 to 1969. While at Prairie View, he majored in physical education and received two varsity letters in football and three in track. He competed in the javelin for the track team.

== Professional football ==
Harvey was signed as a free agent by the Houston Oilers in July 1970. He was initially assigned to the taxi squad, but he was activated at the end of October. He appeared in a total of five games for the Oilers. He was released by the Oilers in September 1971. He was later signed by the Philadelphia Eagles in 1973 but did not appear in any regular-season games.
