= Dan Pastorini =

American football player (born 1949)

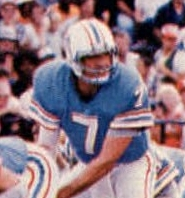
- Pastorini with the Houston Oilers in 1978

No. 7, 10, 6
- Position: Quarterback

Personal information
- Born: May 26, 1949 (age 77); San Francisco, California, U.S.
- Listed height: 6 ft 2 in (1.88 m)
- Listed weight: 208 lb (94 kg)

Career information
- High school: Bellarmine College Prep (San Jose, California)
- College: Santa Clara
- NFL draft: 1971: 1st round, 3rd overall pick

Career history
- Houston Oilers (1971–1979); Oakland Raiders (1980); Los Angeles Rams (1981); Philadelphia Eagles (1982–1983)

Awards and highlights
- Super Bowl champion (XV); Pro Bowl (1975); Second-team Little All-American (1970)

Career NFL statistics
- Passing attempts: 3,055
- Passing completions: 1,556
- Completion percentage: 50.9%
- TD–INT: 103–161
- Passing yards: 18,515
- Passer rating: 59.1
- Stats at Pro Football Reference

Dante Anthony Pastorini (born May 26, 1949) is an American former professional football player who was a quarterback in the National Football League (NFL) for 13 seasons, primarily with the Houston Oilers. He played college football for the Santa Clara Broncos and was selected third overall by the Oilers in the 1971 NFL draft. A Pro Bowl selection during his Oilers tenure, he was also part of the Oakland Raiders team that won a Super Bowl title in Super Bowl XV alongside fellow 1971 pick Jim Plunkett. Pastorini spent his final three seasons in sparse appearances for the Los Angeles Rams and Philadelphia Eagles. After retiring from the NFL, Pastorini pursued a career as a Top Fuel dragster driver in the National Hot Rod Association (NHRA).

== College career ==
Pastorini played college football at Santa Clara University and received second-team honors on the 1970 Little All-America college football team.

Pastorini also played college baseball and was drafted straight out of high school by the New York Mets in the 32nd round of 1967 MLB draft (599 overall) along with future Saints quarterback Archie Manning, but ultimately decided to play football.

== Professional career ==
Pastorini was drafted by the Houston Oilers in the first round (third overall) of the 1971 NFL draft out of Santa Clara University. The draft was dubbed "The Year of the Quarterback" with Pastorini taken third behind Jim Plunkett (first) and Archie Manning (second).

Pastorini was known as a tough quarterback throughout his career. From 1971 through 1979, Pastorini missed only five regular season games, playing through broken ribs and even a punctured lung at times. He was the first player to wear the now ubiquitous "flak jacket" under his uniform to protect broken ribs. He did not play behind what would be considered a quality offensive line until 1977, when the Oilers hired Joe Bugel as offensive line coach and brought in players like Greg Sampson and, later, Leon Gray. By 1978, the Oilers had a running game with the drafting of future Hall of Famer Earl Campbell.

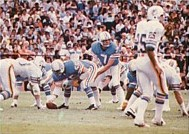
Pastorini playing in the 1978 AFC wild card game for the Oilers

Pastorini was also named to the 1975 AFC Pro Bowl Team. Pastorini's best season came in 1978 when he threw for a career-high 2,473 yards and 16 touchdowns. In the 1978 playoffs, Pastorini fared very well, helping lead the Oilers to wins over the Miami Dolphins and AFC East division champion New England Patriots.

Pastorini's last game as a Houston Oiler was the 1979 AFC championship game against the Pittsburgh Steelers, a game which many Oilers fans contended was decided when the officials blew a call on a Mike Renfro touchdown reception. Instant replay rules were not in effect at the time, so the play could not be reviewed as it would be in the present day. The best replay angles NBC could provide of the play show Renfro clearly catching the ball and getting both feet in the endzone with no juggling. It was not clear to the referees but was clear to some viewers of the game that Renfro had complete control of the ball when he hit the ground. His feet according to the replays were both in bounds when he had possession of the ball. The play was a major turning point in the momentum of the game, which resulted in a Steeler victory.

Later in 1980, Oilers owner, Bud Adams, traded Pastorini to the Oakland Raiders in exchange for an aging Ken Stabler who was three years Pastorini's senior.

Five weeks into the 1980 season with Oakland, after posting a 2–2 record, Pastorini broke his leg against the Kansas City Chiefs. The fans, who had been unhappy with his performance and wanted to see backup Jim Plunkett, cheered when they realized he was hurt. Plunkett, a Heisman Trophy winner out of Stanford, and former starting quarterback for the New England Patriots and San Francisco 49ers, had been with the Raiders as a backup quarterback since 1978. He took over and led the Raiders to a Super Bowl victory over the Philadelphia Eagles in January 1981. Pastorini was later inducted into the Houston Sports Hall of Fame.

== NFL career statistics ==
Legend
	Won the Super Bowl
	Pro Bowl selection
	Led the league
**Bold**	Career high

=== Regular season ===
Year	Team	Games			Passing									Punting				
Year	Team	GP	GS	Record	Cmp	Att	Pct	Yds	Avg	TD	Int	Lng	Rtg	Pnt	Yds	Y/P	Lng	TB
1971	HOU	14	8	4–4	127	270	47.0	1,702	6.3	7	21	62	43.8	75	3,044	35.5	62	4
1972	HOU	14	12	1–11	144	299	48.2	1,711	5.7	7	12	82	57.1	**82**	**3,381**	**41.2**	63	4
1973	HOU	14	10	0–10	154	290	53.1	1,482	5.1	5	17	50	49.0	27	1,087	40.3	59	1
1974	HOU	11	10	6–4	140	247	**56.7**	1,571	6.4	10	10	65	**72.4**	—	—	—	—	—
1975	HOU	14	14	**10–4**	163	342	47.7	2,053	6.0	14	16	77	61.0	62	2,447	39.5	68	**6**
1976	HOU	13	10	4–6	167	309	54.0	1,795	5.8	10	10	67	68.6	70	2,571	36.7	**74**	3
1977	HOU	14	12	8–4	169	319	53.0	1,987	6.2	13	18	**85**	62.3	—	—	—	—	—
1978	HOU	**16**	**16**	10–6	**199**	**368**	54.1	**2,473**	6.7	**16**	17	80	70.4	—	—	—	—	—
1979	HOU	15	15	10–5	163	324	50.3	2,090	6.5	14	18	55	62.1	—	—	—	—	—
1980	OAK	5	5	2–3	66	130	50.8	932	**7.2**	5	8	56	61.4	—	—	—	—	—
1981	LAR	7	5	1–4	64	152	42.1	719	4.7	2	14	46	22.9	—	—	—	—	—
1982	PHI	Did not play																
1983	PHI	3	0	—	0	5	0.0	0	0.0	0	**0**	0	39.6	—	—	—	—	—
Career		140	117	56–61	1,556	3,055	50.9	18,515	6.1	103	161	85	59.1	316	12,530	39.7	74	18

=== Playoffs ===
Year	Team	Games			Passing								
Year	Team	GP	GS	Record	Cmp	Att	Pct	Yds	Avg	TD	Int	Lng	Rtg
1978	HOU	**3**	**3**	**2–1**	**44**	**70**	**62.9**	**602**	**8.6**	**4**	6	**71**	**73.6**
1979	HOU	2	2	1–1	27	46	58.7	352	7.7	0	2	41	64.8
Career		5	5	3–2	71	116	61.2	954	8.2	4	8	71	70.1

== Life outside football ==
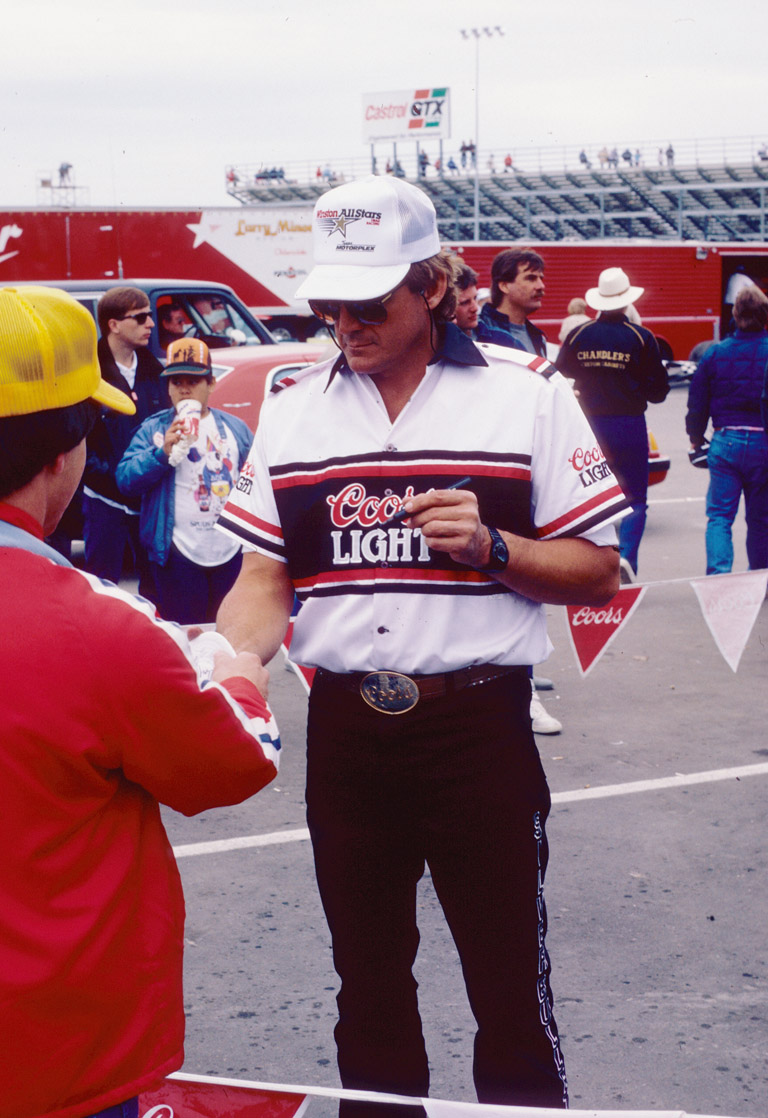
Signing autographs at a 1987 NHRA event

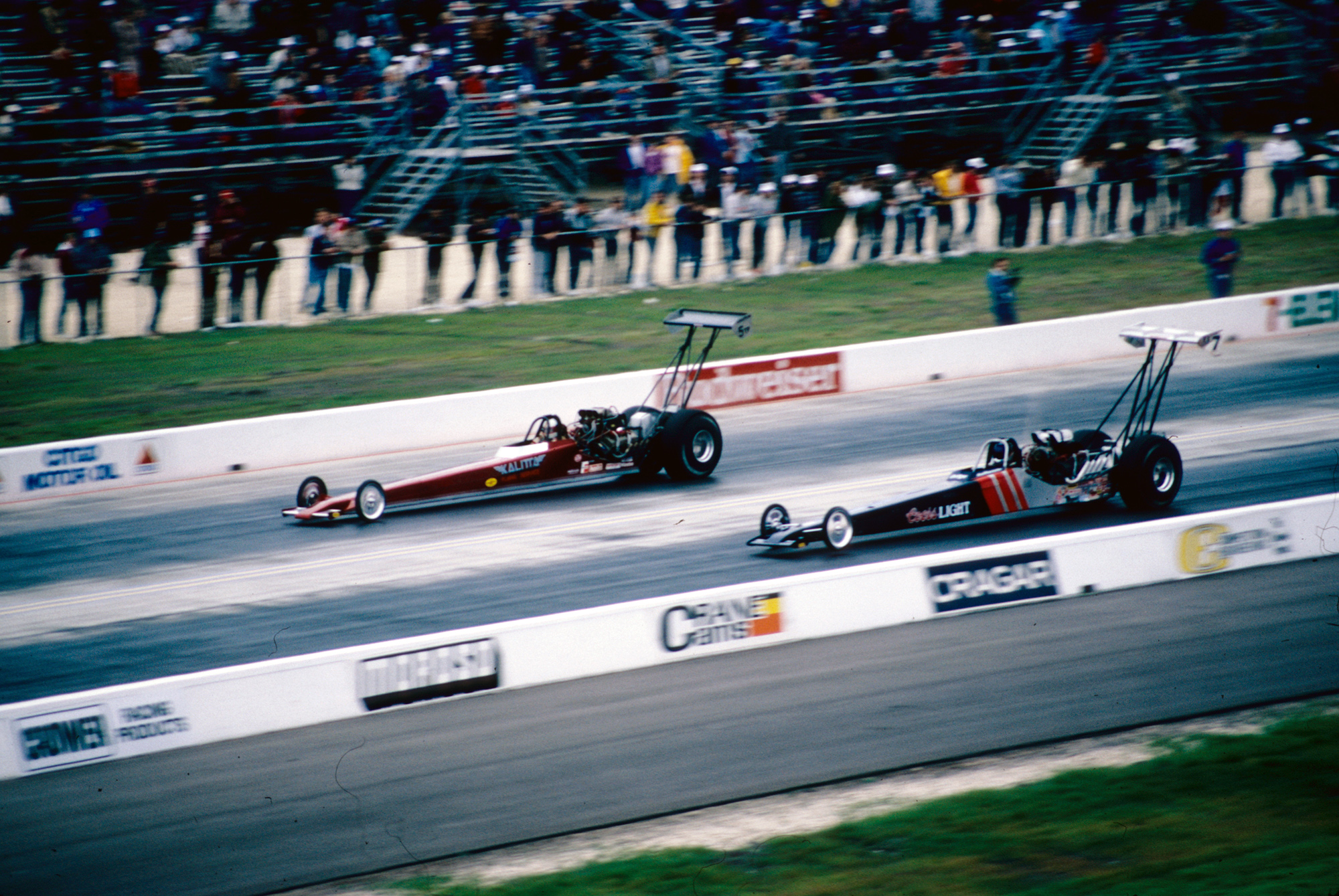
Connie Kalitta vs Pastorini Texas Motorplex, April 1987

Pastorini raced hydroplanes, drag-raced cars, judged wet T-shirt contests, starred in a 1975 movie called Weed: The Florida Connection (with then -wife June Wilkinson), and co-starred in a 1979 Lee Majors movie Killer Fish. He also played a role in the TV series Voyagers! as a gladiator, and posed nude in 1980 for Playgirl magazine. Dian Hanson reported that Pastorini frequented Plato's Retreat at the height of his career in the 1970s.

Pastorini drove a Top Fuel dragster as part of the NHRA Winston Drag Racing Series in the mid-1980s. He won many individual races at national events, but claimed only one event championship in 1986 at the NHRA Southern Nationals in Atlanta, finishing seventh in NHRA Championship Points that year. He was the third man to break the 270-mph barrier in a Top Fuel Dragster. He also participated in the 2009 Lamborghini Race located at Sebring International Raceway.

== Personal life ==
Pastorini met glamour model June Wilkinson in 1972. She was nine years older, and British, and appeared in Playboy magazine in the 1960s. They married in 1973, had one child, a daughter named Brahna, and divorced in 1982. Wilkinson died on July 21, 2025.

An April 2013 resolution by the Texas State Legislature declared Pastorini an Honorary Texan. In January 2012, on The Jim Rome Radio Show, Pastorini recalled a story how then-Raider owner Al Davis completely blew him off in the locker room after a game. "He sneered at me" said Pastorini. Pastorini then went on to say that, "when he (Davis) passed away, I wasn't sad to see him go." Pastorini currently lives and works in Houston. His autobiography, Taking Flak: My Life in the Fast Lane, was released in November 2011.

== Motorsports career results ==
=== Rolex Sports Car Series ===
==== Grand Touring ====
(key) Bold – Pole Position. (Overall Finish/Class Finish).

Year	Team	1	2	3	4	5	6	7	8	9	10	11	12	13	14	Rank	Points
2005	The Racer's Group	DAY	HOM	CAL	LGA (41/19)	MON	WGL	DAY	BAR	WGL	MOH	PHO	WGL	VIR	MEX	146th	12
