= Hank Autry =

American football player (1947–2014)

No. 61
- Position: Center

Personal information
- Born: May 2, 1947; Hattiesburg, Mississippi, U.S.
- Died: January 28, 2014 (aged 66)
- Listed height: 6 ft 3 in (1.91 m)
- Listed weight: 240 lb (109 kg)

Career information
- High school: Hattiesburg
- College: Southern Miss (1965-1968)
- NFL draft: 1969: 17th round, 430th overall pick

Career history
- Houston Oilers (1969-1970)

Career NFL/AFL statistics
- Games played: 28
- Fumble recoveries: 1
- Stats at Pro Football Reference

Melvin Henry Autry (May 2, 1947 – January 28, 2014) was an American professional football player in the American Football League (AFL) and the National Football League (NFL). He played college football at University of Southern Mississippi, where he was a center. Autry played in the AFL for the Houston Oilers in 1969 and the NFL's Oilers in 1970. He died in 2014 at the age of 66.

== See also ==
- List of American Football League players
