= Houston Sports Hall of Fame =

The Houston Sports Hall of Fame is a Hall of Fame that honors sports figures from or associated with the Houston area that have made a significant impact in their sport. It is located in Downtown Houston at GreenStreet. The inductees can come from major professional sports teams as well as college or high school teams in Greater Houston. If the sport is a non-team sport, such as boxing and golf, they may get inducted by growing up in the area.

== Inductees ==
Name	Sport	Position	Team
Earl Campbell	Football	Running back	Oilers
Hakeem Olajuwon	Basketball	Center	Rockets, University of Houston
Nolan Ryan	Baseball	Pitcher	Astros, Alvin High School
Jack Burke, Jr	Golf		
George Foreman	Boxing		
A. J. Foyt	Auto racing		
Dan Pastorini	Football	Quarterback	Oilers
Mary Lou Retton	Gymnastics		
Carl Lewis	Track and Field		University of Houston
Rudy Tomjanovich	Basketball	Forward, Head Coach	Rockets
Andre Johnson	Football	Wide receiver	Texans
Bill Yeoman	Football	Head Coach	University of Houston
Guy Lewis	Basketball	Head Coach	University of Houston
Jeff Bagwell	Baseball	First baseman	Astros
Craig Biggio	Baseball	Second baseman, Catcher, Center field	Astros
Sheryl Swoopes	Basketball	Forward	Comets
Clyde Drexler	Basketball	Guard	Rockets, University of Houston, Sterling High School
Roger Clemens	Baseball	Pitcher	Astros, Spring Woods High School
Elvin Hayes	Basketball	Forward, Center	Rockets, University of Houston
Bruce Matthews	Football	Guard, Center, Offensive tackle	Oilers
Lance Berkman	Baseball	Outfielder, First baseman	Astros, Rice University
Cynthia Cooper	Basketball	Guard	Comets
Warren Moon	Football	Quarterback	Oilers
Ken Houston	Football	Safety	Oilers
Van Chancellor	Basketball	Head Coach	Comets
Andre Ware	Football	Quarterback	University of Houston, Dickinson High School
Billy Wagner	Baseball	Pitcher	Astros
Brian Ching	Soccer	Forward	Dynamo
J. J. Watt	Football	Defensive end	Texans
