= Bob Naponic =

American football player (born 1947)

No. 14
- Position: Quarterback

Personal information
- Born: March 9, 1947 (age 79); Greensburg, Pennsylvania, U.S.
- Listed height: 6 ft 0 in (1.83 m)
- Listed weight: 190 lb (86 kg)

Career information
- High school: Hempfield Area (Greensburg)
- College: Illinois (1965–1968)
- NFL draft: 1969: 10th round, 256th overall pick

Career history
- Houston Oilers (1970)

Career NFL statistics
- Passing yards: 85
- TD-INT: 0–2
- Passer rating: 5.2
- Stats at Pro Football Reference

Robert Andrew Naponic (born March 9, 1947) is an American former professional football player who was a quarterback for the Houston Oilers of the National Football League (NFL). He played college football for the Illinois Fighting Illini.

His NFL career lasted but a single season, 1970, which was also the first of the Oilers' forty seasons in the NFL after the AFL–NFL merger.

== Biography ==
Naponic played collegiately at the University of Illinois Urbana-Champaign.

During his sole year with the Oilers, Naponic was third on the depth chart behind Charley Johnson and Jerry Rhome. Up until the final game for the 1970 season, he had thrown only one pass, for an incompletion in a 44–0 loss to the St. Louis Cardinals. His final game took place at the Cotton Bowl against the Dallas Cowboys. With injuries to Rhome and Johnson, Naponic took over the quarterback duties against the Doomsday Defense. He completed 6 of 19 passes for a net of 65 yards 52–10 Oiler loss.

Naponic's son, Jackson, later played football as a fullback at Texas Christian University while pursuing a finance degree.
