= Ben Mayes =

American football player (1945–1988)

No. 77, 88
- Positions: Defensive end, Defensive tackle

Personal information
- Born: March 16, 1945; St. Petersburg, Florida, U.S.
- Died: December 15, 1988 (aged 43); St. Petersburg, Florida, U.S.
- Listed height: 6 ft 5 in (1.96 m)
- Listed weight: 265 lb (120 kg)

Career information
- High school: Gibbs (St. Petersburg)
- College: Drake (1964-1968)
- NFL draft: 1969: 5th round, 105th overall pick

Career history
- Houston Oilers (1969); Jacksonville Sharks (1974); Portland Storm (1974)
- Stats at Pro Football Reference

Benjamin Clayton Mayes (March 16, 1945 – December 15, 1988) was an American football defensive end who played for the Houston Oilers of the American Football League, as well as the Jacksonville Sharks and the Portland Storm of the World Football League. He played college football at Drake.

== College football career ==
Mayes played for the Drake Bulldogs from 1964 to 1968, redshirting his first two years.

== Professional football career ==
=== Houston Oilers ===
Mayes was drafted by the Buffalo Bills of the National Football League in the fifth round of the 1969 NFL/AFL draft. However, he instead signed with the Houston Oilers, who played in the American Football League. He played five games with the Oilers at defensive end.

=== Jacksonville Sharks ===
In 1974, Mayes signed with the Jacksonville Sharks of the World Football League. He played defensive end as well as right defensive tackle with the Sharks.

=== Portland Storm ===
The Sharks folded after playing only fourteen out of twenty games during the 1974 season, and Mayes joined the Portland Storm, where he played defensive end.

== Death ==
Mayes died on December 15, 1988, in St. Petersburg, Florida, at the age of 43.
