= Leroy Mitchell =

American football player (born 1944)

No. 41
- Position: Cornerback

Personal information
- Born: September 22, 1944 (age 82); Wharton, Texas, U.S.
- Listed height: 6 ft 1 in (1.85 m)
- Listed weight: 190 lb (86 kg)

Career information
- High school: Wharton
- College: Texas Southern
- NFL draft: 1967: 11th round, 283rd overall pick

Career history
- Boston Patriots (1967-1968); Houston Oilers (1970); Denver Broncos (1971–1973)

Awards and highlights
- AFL All-Star (1968)

Career NFL/AFL statistics
- Interceptions: 19
- Fumble recoveries: 3
- Touchdowns: 1
- Stats at Pro Football Reference

Leroy Mitchell (born September 22, 1944) is an American former professional football player who was a cornerback in the American Football League (AFL) and National Football League (NFL). He played college football for the Texas Southern Tigers. In 1967, he joined the AFL's Boston Patriots. He played there for two seasons and was an AFL All-Star selection in 1968. He would go on to play in the NFL for the Houston Oilers (1970), and the Denver Broncos (1971–1973).

== See also ==
- List of American Football League players
