= Allen Aldridge (defensive end) =

American gridiron football player (1945–2015)

No. 44, 88, 75, 83
- Position: Defensive end

Personal information
- Born: April 27, 1944; Eagle Lake, Texas, U.S.
- Died: September 30, 2015 (aged 71); Missouri City, Texas, U.S.

Career information
- College: Prairie View A&M

Career history
- Toronto Argonauts (1967–1969); Hamilton Tiger-Cats (1970); Houston Oilers (1971–1972); Cleveland Browns (1974); Shreveport Steamer (1975); Chicago Winds (1975)

Career statistics
- Games: 35
- Stats at Pro Football Reference

Allen Ray Aldridge Sr. (April 27, 1944 – September 30, 2015) was an American football defensive end who played in the Canadian Football League (CFL), National Football League (CFL) and World Football League (WFL). He played for the Houston Oilers and Cleveland Browns. In the Canadian Football League, Aldridge played for the Toronto Argonauts and the Hamilton Tiger-Cats. In 1968, he was named to the East All-Star team. He also played college football for the Prairie View A&M Panthers.
