= Floyd Rice =

American football player (1949–2011)

No. 85, 57, 52, 55
- Position: Linebacker

Personal information
- Born: August 31, 1949; Natchez, Mississippi, U.S.
- Died: November 8, 2011 (aged 62); Natchez, Mississippi, U.S.
- Listed height: 6 ft 3 in (1.91 m)
- Listed weight: 223 lb (101 kg)

Career information
- College: Alcorn State
- NFL draft: 1971: 9th round, 212th overall pick

Career history
- Houston Oilers (1971–1973); San Diego Chargers (1973–1975); Oakland Raiders (1976–1977); New Orleans Saints (1978)

Awards and highlights
- Super Bowl champion (XI)

Career NFL statistics
- Sacks: 9.5
- Fumble recoveries: 7
- Interceptions: 7
- Total TDs: 2
- Stats at Pro Football Reference

Floyd Elliott Rice (August 31, 1949 – November 8, 2011) was an American professional football linebacker who played eight seasons in the National Football League (NFL) for the Houston Oilers, San Diego Chargers, Oakland Raiders, and the New Orleans Saints. He played college football at Alcorn State University.
