= Wally Lemm =

American football player and coach (1919–1988)

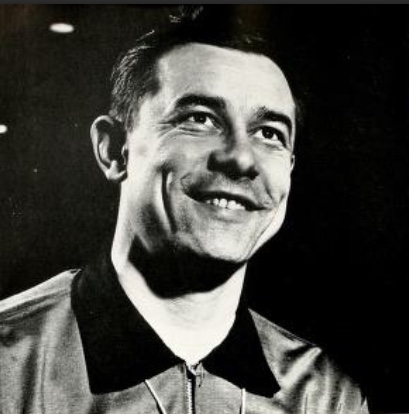
- Lemm from the 1959 Forester

Biographical details
- Born: October 23, 1919; Chicago, Illinois, U.S.
- Died: October 8, 1988 (aged 68); Milwaukee, Wisconsin, U.S.

Playing career

Football
- 1938–1941: Carroll (WI)

Coaching career (HC unless noted)

Football
- 1945: Notre Dame (assistant)
- 1946–1947: Carroll (WI) (backfield)
- 1948: Waukesha HS (WI)
- 1949–1951: Lake Forest (backfield)
- 1952–1953: Lake Forest
- 1954: Montana State (assistant)
- 1955: Montana State
- 1956: Chicago Cardinals (DB)
- 1957: Lake Forest
- 1959: Chicago Cardinals (DB)
- 1960–1961: Houston Oilers (AHC)
- 1961: Houston Oilers (interim HC)
- 1962–1965: St. Louis Cardinals
- 1966–1970: Houston Oilers

Basketball
- 1949–1954: Lake Forest
- 1954–1955: Montana State
- 1958–1959: Lake Forest

Head coaching record
- Overall: 64–64–7 (AFL/NFL regular season); 21–10–2 (college football); 80–72 (college basketball)

Accomplishments and honors

Championships
- Football; 2 CCI (1952, 1957); AFL (1961)

Walter Horner Lemm (October 23, 1919 – October 8, 1988) was an American football coach at the high school, collegiate and professional levels. He achieved his greatest prominence as head coach of the American Football League (AFL)'s Houston Oilers and the National Football League (NFL)'s St. Louis Cardinals.

== Early career ==
Lemm graduated from Carroll College, in Waukesha, Wisconsin, in 1942 after playing football for head coach John W. Breen. After service in World War II during the next two years, Lemm served as an assistant coach at the University of Notre Dame under Hugh Devore in 1945. Lemm returned to Carroll as an assistant coach with the school's football team the following year, then became a head coach for the first time, accepting the top job for Waukesha High School in 1948.

== Coaching career ==
Following Lemm's one year at Waukesha, Carroll's former coach, Breen, took the head coaching position at Lake Forest College. Lemm served under his leadership for the next three years, while also working as the school's head basketball coach, then replaced Breen in 1952. During his two seasons, he compiled an 11–4–1 record before leaving to accept the head coach position at Montana State University. An 8–1 season in 1954 was followed the next year by a 4–4–1 campaign. On May 14, 1956, he reached the National Football League (NFL) when he accepted a defensive assistant position with the Chicago Cardinals.

Lemm spent just one season before resigning to again accept the head coaching position at Lake Forest. During the next two years, he nearly matched his previous stint at the school with an 11–5 record, winning District Coach of the Year accolades in 1957 from the National Association of Intercollegiate Athletics (NAIA). On February 21, 1959, he returned to an assistant's role with the Cardinals, and would remain at the professional level for the remainder of his career.

After again spending a single season with the Cardinals, Lemm resigned on January 12, 1960, to accept an assistant coaching position with the Houston Oilers of the seminal American Football League. During the first season of play, the Oilers captured the league's first-ever title, but Lemm resigned after the season, returning to Libertyville, Illinois to work in the sporting goods industry.

However, after a slow start to the 1961 season that saw the team with a 1–3–1 record, Oilers' head coach Lou Rymkus was fired. Lemm was offered the position by his former coach John Breen, the Oilers' Director of Player Personnel, and proceeded to lead the team to nine straight victories. The team then won its second straight title with a 10–3 win over the San Diego Chargers on December 24, 1961, and Lemm was named AFL Coach of the Year by both UPI and the Associated Press for his efforts.

After orally agreeing to a contract for the next season, Lemm instead resigned on February 22, 1962, to take the top spot with the Cardinals, citing the proximity of St. Louis to his home in Lake Bluff, Illinois. He replaced Pop Ivy at St. Louis, and Ivy replaced Lemm at Houston. After a 4–9–1 record in his first year, Lemm came close to capturing the NFL's Eastern Conference title with a 9–5 season in 1963 and a 9–3–2 mark the following year. After signing a contract with a huge pay increase, the Cardinals crashed in 1965 with a 5–9 mark, with Lemm seemingly having job security. However, after Lemm was asked to stay in St. Louis as a full-time coach, he resigned on January 10, 1966, again citing family considerations. Oddly, he then accepted the head coaching job with his former team in Houston 19 days later.

The Oilers struggled in 1966 with a 3–11 record, but bounced back in 1967 with a 9–4–1 record and a spot in the AFL Championship game. After a 40–7 thrashing at the hands of the Oakland Raiders, the Oilers again reached the postseason in 1969 compiling a mediocre 6–6–2 record and were again dismantled by the Raiders, 56–7, in the AFL's oddly constructed one year playoff system. For that season the first place team of the West played the second place team of the East and vice versa. The team's first year in the post-merger NFL, 1970, finished with a disastrous 3–10–1 mark. Following a 44–0 loss to his former team in St. Louis on November 1, 1970, Lemm announced he would be retiring at the conclusion of the year, this time citing health issues. Lemm's final game came on December 20 of that year, a 52–10 loss to the Oilers' Lone Star State rivals, the Dallas Cowboys.

== Later life and death ==
Lemm's grave at Forest Home Cemetery

Lemm died on October 8, 1988, in Milwaukee, Wisconsin after a college reunion. He was buried at Forest Home Cemetery.

== Head coaching record ==
=== College football ===
Year	Team	Overall	Conference	Standing	Bowl/playoffs
Lake Forest Foresters (College Conference of Illinois) (1952–1953)
1952	Lake Forest	6–1–1	3–0–1	T–1st	
1953	Lake Forest	5–3	4–1	2nd	
Montana State Bobcats (Rocky Mountain Conference) (1955)
1955	Montana State	4–4–1	3–2–1	3rd	
Montana State:		4–4–1	3–2–1		
Lake Forest Foresters (College Conference of Illinois) (1957)
1957	Lake Forest	6–2	6–1	T–1st	
Lake Forest:		17–6–1	13–2–1		
Total:		21–10–2			
National championship Conference title Conference division title or championship game berth

=== AFL/NFL ===
Team	Year	Regular season					Postseason			
Team	Year	Won	Lost	Ties	Win %	Finish	Won	Lost	Win %	Result
HOU	1961*	9	0	0	1.000	1st in AFL Eastern Division	1	0	1.000	Beat San Diego Chargers in AFL Championship Game
STL	1962	4	9	1	.308	6th in NFL Eastern Conference	-	-	-	
STL	1963	9	5	0	.643	3rd in NFL Eastern Conference	-	-	-	
STL	1964	9	3	2	.750	2nd in NFL Eastern Conference	-	-	-	
STL	1965	5	9	0	.357	5th in NFL Eastern Conference	-	-	-	
STL Total		27	26	3	.509		-	-	-	
HOU	1966	3	11	0	.214	4th in AFL Western Division	-	-	-	
HOU	1967	9	4	1	.692	1st in AFL Eastern Division	0	1	.000	Lost to Oakland Raiders in AFL championship game
HOU	1968	7	7	0	.500	2nd in AFL Eastern Division	-	-	-	
HOU	1969	6	6	2	.500	2nd in AFL Eastern Division	0	1	.000	Lost to Oakland Raiders in Divisional Round
HOU	1970	3	10	1	.231	4th in AFC Central	-	-	-	
HOU Total		37	38	4	.493		-	-	-	
Total		64	64	7	.500		1	2	.333	

- Interim coach for last 9 games of regular season

== See also ==
- List of American Football League players
