= Phil Croyle =

American football player (1949–2020)

No. 59, 54
- Position: Linebacker

Personal information
- Born: October 30, 1949; Great Lakes, Illinois, U.S.
- Died: May 30, 2020 (aged 70); San Jose, California, U.S.
- Listed height: 6 ft 3 in (1.91 m)
- Listed weight: 223 lb (101 kg)

Career information
- High school: San Lorenzo (CA)
- College: California
- NFL draft: 1971: 7th round, 159th overall pick

Career history
- Houston Oilers (1971–1973); Buffalo Bills (1973)

Awards and highlights
- Second-team All-American (1970); First-team All-Pac-8 (1970); Second-team All-Pac-8 (1969)
- Stats at Pro Football Reference

Phil Croyle (October 30, 1949 – May 30, 2020) was an American football linebacker. He played for the Houston Oilers from 1971 to 1973 and for the Buffalo Bills in 1973.

He died of cancer on May 30, 2020, in San Jose, California at age 70.
