= Jim LeMoine =

American football player (born 1945)

No. 60, 82, 62
- Positions: Guard, Tight end

Personal information
- Born: April 29, 1945 (age 81); Alameda, California, U.S.
- Listed height: 6 ft 2 in (1.88 m)
- Listed weight: 250 lb (113 kg)

Career information
- High school: Alameda
- College: Utah State (1965-1966)
- NFL draft: 1967: 2nd round, 42nd overall pick

Career history
- Buffalo Bills (1967); Houston Oilers (1968-1969)

Career AFL statistics
- Games played: 35
- Games started: 1
- Stats at Pro Football Reference

James Douglas LeMoine (born April 29, 1945) is an American former professional football player who was an offensive guard for three seasons in the American Football League (AFL) with the Buffalo Bills and Houston Oilers. He played college football as a tight end for the Utah State Aggies.
