= Loyd Wainscott =

American football player (1946–2010)

No. 53, 55
- Position: Linebacker

Personal information
- Born: October 26, 1946; Texas City, Texas, U.S.
- Died: December 5, 2010 (aged 64); Spring, Texas, U.S
- Listed height: 6 ft 2 in (1.88 m)
- Listed weight: 235 lb (107 kg)

Career information
- High school: La Marque (La Marque, Texas)
- College: Texas (1965-1968)
- NFL draft: 1969: 16th round, 405th overall pick

Career history
- Houston Oilers (1969–1970); Houston Texans-Shreveport Steamer (1974)

Awards and highlights
- First-team All-American (1968); First-team All-SWC (1968)

Career NFL/AFL statistics
- Games played: 25
- Stats at Pro Football Reference

Loyd Dale Wainscott (October 26, 1946 – December 5, 2010) was an American professional football linebacker. He played for the Houston Oilers from 1969 to 1970.

He died on December 5, 2010, in Spring, Texas at age 64.
