= Bob Smith (defensive back, born 1945) =

American football player (born 1945)

No. 23
- Position: Defensive back

Personal information
- Born: December 28, 1945 (age 80); Williamson, West Virginia, U.S.
- Listed height: 6 ft 0 in (1.83 m)
- Listed weight: 181 lb (82 kg)

Career information
- High school: Hughes (Cincinnati, Ohio)
- College: Miami (OH) (1964–1967)
- NFL draft: 1968: 16th round, 430th overall pick

Career history
- Houston Oilers (1968); New England Patriots (1971)*
- * Offseason or practice squad member only
- Stats at Pro Football Reference

Robert Bert Smith (born December 28, 1945) is an American former professional football defensive back who played one season with the Houston Oilers of the American Football League (AFL). He was selected by the Oilers in the 16th round of the 1968 NFL/AFL draft after playing college football at Miami University.

== Early life and college ==
Robert Bert Smith was born on December 28, 1945, in Williamson, West Virginia. He attended Hughes High School in Cincinnati, Ohio.

He was a member of the Miami RedHawks football team from 1964 to 1967, and a three-year letterman from 1965 to 1967.

== Professional career ==
Smith was selected by the Houston Oilers of the American Football League (AFL) in the 16th round, with the 430th overall pick, of the 1968 NFL/AFL draft. He played in six games for the Oilers in 1968 and spent part of the season on the taxi squad. In 1969, he was placed on the reserve list due to military service. Smith was activated in 1970 but later released.

Smith signed with the New England Patriots of the National Football League in 1971 but was later released.
