= John W. Breen =

American football and basketball player, coach, and executive (1907–1984)

Biographical details
- Born: May 9, 1907; Milwaukee, Wisconsin, U.S.
- Died: February 9, 1984 (aged 76); Houston, Texas, U.S.

Playing career

Football
- 1930–1934: Carroll (WI)
- Position: Quarterback

Coaching career (HC unless noted)

Football
- 1935–1937: Carroll (WI) (assistant)
- 1938–1948: Carroll (WI)
- 1949–1951: Lake Forest

Basketball
- 1938–1942: Carroll (WI)
- 1945–1946: Carroll (WI)

Administrative career (AD unless noted)
- 1938–1949: Carroll (WI)
- 1949–1957: Lake Forest
- 1957–1960: Chicago Cardinals (DPP)
- 1960–1971: Houston Oilers (DPP)
- 1971–1973: Houston Oilers (GM)

Head coaching record
- Overall: 43–35–8 (football); 42–43 (basketball)

John W. Breen (May 9, 1907 – February 9, 1984) was an American football and basketball player, coach, and executive. He was active in the college ranks before becoming an administrator in the American Football League for the Houston Oilers.

== Playing career ==
Breen grew up in Milwaukee, Wisconsin and played high school football at Milwaukee East Division High School. He then went on to Carroll College in Waukesha, Wisconsin where he was named "most valuable player" and team captain in both football and basketball.

== Coaching career and military service ==
=== Carroll (WI) ===
After graduation from Carroll in 1935, Breen began coaching freshman teams and teaching classes. Breen was the 19th head football coach, serving held that for 11 seasons, from 1938 until 1948.

Breen's tenure at Carroll was interrupted by World War II, during which he served as a lieutenant commander in the United States Navy.

=== Lake Forest ===
In 1949, Breen became the head coach at Lake Forest College in Lake Forest, Illinois and held the position for three seasons, through 1951. During his tenure as head coach, he accumulated a record of 9–13–2. While at Lake Forest he received nationwide publicity for defending the interests of small college athletics. In 1974, Lake Forest inducted him into their athletic "Hall of Fame" for his contribution to the football and basketball programs at the school.

== Professional football executive career ==
After a successful college career as an educator and coach, Breen went into the professional ranks with the Chicago Cardinals of the National Football League (NFL) as director of player personnel in 1957. He was later the first person hired by the Houston Oilers in 1960 as director of player personnel and was named general manager in 1971 and he held that position until his retirement in 1973.

Breen was instrumental in the building of the Oilers and the American Football League (AFL) itself by being in charge of the league's first draft of players. He is credited with recruiting veteran players George Blanda, John Carson, and Willard Dewveall along with first-year players Billy Cannon, Dan Lanphear, and Charley Hennigan. He recognized that the competing NFL teams would cut good quality players, and he recruited them to play at Houston.

== Later life and death ==
After his retirement from professional football management, Breen worked as a sports broadcaster for radio station KTRH in Houston. He died on February 9, 1984, in Houston, after suffering from cancer.

== Head coaching record ==
=== Football ===
Year	Team	Overall	Conference	Standing	Bowl/playoffs
Carroll Pioneers (Independent) (1938–1948)
1938	Carroll	6–1			
1939	Carroll	4–2–1			
1940	Carroll	3–3–1			
1941	Carroll	2–5			
1942	Carroll	5–1–1			
1943	No team—World War II				
1944	No team—World War II				
1945	Carroll	1–3			
1946	Carroll	4–2–1			
1947	Carroll	5–1–2			
1948	Carroll	4–4			
Carroll:		34–22–6			
Lake Forest Foresters (College Conference of Illinois) (1949–1951)
1949	Lake Forest	3–5	3–2	3rd	
1950	Lake Forest	3–4–1	3–2	4th	
1951	Lake Forest	3–4–1	3–2	T–3rd	
Lake Forest:		9–13–2	9–6		
Total:		43–35–8			
