= Ed Carrington =

American football player (born 1944)

No. 88
- Position: Tight end

Personal information
- Born: September 1, 1944; Beaumont, Texas, U.S.
- Died: August 22, 1986 (aged 41); Grand Teton National Park, U.S.
- Listed height: 6 ft 4 in (1.93 m)
- Listed weight: 225 lb (102 kg)

Career information
- High school: Episcopal (Alexandria, Virginia)
- College: Virginia (1963–1966)
- AFL draft: 1967: 7th round, 164th overall pick

Career history
- Houston Oilers (1967–1969)

Awards and highlights
- First-team All-ACC (1966)
- Stats at Pro Football Reference

Edward Codrington Carrington Jr. (September 1, 1944 – August 22, 1986) was an American professional football player who was a tight end for two seasons with the Houston Oilers of the American Football League (AFL). He played college football for the Virginia Cavaliers and was selected by the Oilers in the seventh round of the 1967 NFL/AFL draft.

== Early life ==
Edward Codrington Carrington Jr. was born on September 1, 1944, in Beaumont, Texas. He participated in football, basketball, and baseball at Episcopal High School in Alexandria, Virginia. He was a three-year letterman in both football and basketball. As a senior, he was a co-caption of the football team and an alternate captain for the basketball team. Carrington was also a hitter and pitcher in baseball, being named co-captain as a junior and captain as a senior. He once threw a no-hitter in high school. He graduated in 1963. Carrington was inducted into the school's athletics hall of fame in 1993.

== College career ==
Carrington was a member of the Virginia Cavaliers of the University of Virginia from 1963 to 1966. He was a three-year letterman from 1964 to 1966. He caught 12 passes for 197 yards and one touchdown in 1964. Carrington recorded 26 receptions for 352 yards and six touchdowns in 1965. His six receiving touchdowns were the most in the Atlantic Coast Conference (ACC) that season. He caught 32 passes for 411 yards and five touchdowns his senior year in 1966, earning Associated Press first-team All-ACC honors. Carrington's four touchdown catches against Maryland on November 19, 1966, set a single-game school record. He played in the Senior Bowl after his senior season.

== Professional career ==
Carrington was selected by the Houston Oilers in the seventh round, with the 164th overall pick, of the 1967 NFL draft. In July 1967, it was reported that Carrington was not signing with the Oilers and instead becoming a lawyer. However, he later spent the 1967 season on the Oilers' taxi squad. He played in one game for the Oilers in 1968 and underwent knee surgery during the season. Carrington appeared in all 14 games during the 1969 season but did not record any catches. He was released in 1970.

== Personal life ==
Carrington graduated from the University of Houston with a law degree. He died on August 22, 1986, in a rock climbing accident at Grand Teton National Park. He fell 150 feet after forgetting to fasten his harness. He was employed at the Houston law firm of Bonham, Carrington, & Fox at the time of his death.
