= Bob Atkins (American football) =

American football player (1946–2020)

No. 48
- Position: Defensive back

Personal information
- Born: April 2, 1946; Modesto, California, U.S.
- Died: September 22, 2020 (aged 74)
- Listed height: 6 ft 3 in (1.91 m)
- Listed weight: 215 lb (98 kg)

Career information
- High school: Luther Judson Price (Atlanta, Georgia)
- College: Grambling State
- NFL draft: 1968: 2nd round, 42nd overall pick

Career history
- St. Louis Cardinals (1968–1969); Houston Oilers (1970–1976)

Career NFL statistics
- Interceptions: 19
- Fumble recoveries: 4
- Touchdowns: 1
- Sacks: 1.5
- Stats at Pro Football Reference

Robert Lee Atkins Jr. (April 2, 1946 – September 22, 2020) was an American professional football player who was a defensive back in the National Football League (NFL). He played for the St. Louis Cardinals (1968–1969) and for the Houston Oilers (1970–1976). He was born on April 2, 1946, in Modesto, California, and became a native of Atlanta, Georgia. When he was three years old, his parents, U.S. Navy Sailor Robert and Mary Brown Atkins, relocated their family from California to Georgia in 1949. At Luther J. Price High School, he was an exceptional player in three sports, baseball, basketball, and football. After graduating in 1964, Atkins attended Grambling College—now Grambling State University—in Grambling, Louisiana. He received a Bachelor of Science degree in Physical Education and Recreation in 1972. In 1986, he received a Master of Education degree from Prairie View A&M University (PVAMU) in Prairie View, Texas.

In 1968, the St. Louis Cardinals drafted Atkins in the second round as a cornerback. After the draft, he played in two major all-star games: January 1968, the 19th Annual Senior Bowl All Star Game, and in August 1968, the College All-Star Game against the National Football League World Champs Green Bay Packers. As a rookie with the Cardinals, Atkins became known for his exceptional speed and his authoritative hits. Playing two years for the Cardinals, Atkins was traded to the Houston Oilers in 1970. During his seven-year tenure with the Oilers, he was respected on and off the field for his achievements. He won numerous game balls for outstanding game performances often cited in national and local media. Retiring from the Houston Oilers in 1976, Atkins pursued other opportunities.

In 1983, he became Head Women's Basketball Coach and Assistant Football Coach at Sam Houston High School in Houston, Texas. Atkins accepted in 1984 the first of three major positions that he would hold at PVAMU: He was the Assistant Football Coach and Head Women's Basketball Coach. Atkins resigned in 2005 from these positions and assumed the position of Director of Athletic Operations. He retired from PVAMU in August 2011.

Atkins received recognition from Houston's Third-Ward Community for his exemplary volunteer service rendered to the Professional United Leadership League (PULL). He worked seven years at PULL with inner-city teens for whom he was a big brother and counselor. He received the “L. J. Price School Athletic Alumni Award” at the school's 2009 Second Annual Crimson Award Ceremony held in Atlanta, Georgia. He was commended for scholarly presentations in his fields of expertise at both state and national levels. He was also a member of the NFL Association. On July 8, 2017, Atkins was inducted into the Grambling Legends Hall of Fame. Atkins first marriage was to Norma Jo Wheeler. They had a son, Christopher E. Atkins. Atkins has four grandchildren; Tobias, Simeon, Moorea, and Harysn. Atkins second marriage was to Dottie Winchester Malone Atkins.

Atkins died on September 22, 2020, at the age of 74.
