= Benny Johnson (American football) =

American football player (1948–1988)

No. 33, 38, 0, 22
- Position: Cornerback

Personal information
- Born: June 29, 1948; Fort Valley, Georgia, U.S.
- Died: August 10, 1988 (aged 40); Orlando, Florida, U.S.
- Listed height: 5 ft 11 in (1.80 m)
- Listed weight: 178 lb (81 kg)

Career information
- High school: Jones (Orlando, Florida)
- College: Johnson C. Smith (1966–1969)
- NFL draft: 1970: 6th round, 144th overall pick

Career history
- Houston Oilers (1970–1973); Philadelphia Bell (1974); San Diego Chargers (1975)*; Denver Broncos (1975)*; New Orleans Saints (1976)
- * Offseason or practice squad member only
- Stats at Pro Football Reference

Benny L. Johnson (June 29, 1948 – August 10, 1988) was an American professional football cornerback who played five seasons in the National Football League (NFL) with the Houston Oilers and New Orleans Saints. He was selected by the Oilers in the sixth round of the 1970 NFL draft after playing college football at Johnson C. Smith University. He also played for the Philadelphia Bell of the World Football League (WFL).

== Early life and college ==
Benny L. Johnson was born on June 29, 1948, in Fort Valley, Georgia. He attended Jones High School in Orlando, Florida.

He played college football for the Johnson C. Smith Golden Bulls of Johnson C. Smith University from 1966 to 1969.

== Professional career ==
Johnson was selected by the Houston Oilers in the sixth round, with the 144th overall pick, of the 1970 NFL draft. He played in all 14 games for the Oilers during his rookie season in 1970, returning 15 kicks for 320 yards. He appeared in ten games, starting four, in 1971. He played in all 14 games, starting ten, during the 1972 season, totaling one interception for 34 yards, 13 kick returns for 230 yards, one fumble, and two fumble recoveries. Johnson played in 13 games, starting four, in 1973. He became a free agent after the 1973 season.

Johnson signed with the Philadelphia Bell of the World Football League on July 3, 1974. He recorded one interception for the Bell during the 1974 season.

On May 29, 1975, the Oilers traded the rights to Johnson and Booker Brown to the San Diego Chargers for Carl Mauck. Johnson was waived by the Chargers on September 10, 1975.

He was claimed off waivers by the Denver Broncos on September 11, 1975, but was waived soon later on September 17, 1975.

Johnson was signed by the New Orleans Saints on March 29, 1976. He played in nine games for the Saints during the 1976 season. He was released in 1977.

== Personal life ==
Johnson spent time as a volunteer assistant coach at his alma mater, Jones High School. On August 10, 1988, at the age of 40, he died of a heart attack while jogging in Orlando, Florida.
