= Garland Boyette =

American football player (1940–2022)

No. 50, 55, 52
- Positions: Linebacker, Defensive end

Personal information
- Born: March 22, 1940; Rayville, Louisiana, U.S.
- Died: April 19, 2022 (aged 82); Houston, Texas, U.S.
- Listed height: 6 ft 1 in (1.85 m)
- Listed weight: 238 lb (108 kg)

Career information
- High school: Wallace (Orange, Texas)
- College: Grambling State
- NFL draft: 1962: undrafted

Career history

Playing
- St. Louis Cardinals (1962–1963); Montreal Alouettes (1964–1965); Houston Oilers (1966–1972); Houston Texans-Shreveport Steamer (1974); Shreveport Steamer (1975)

Coaching
- Houston Oilers (1973) Special assistant coach; Houston Texans-Shreveport Steamer (1974) Linebackers coach

Awards and highlights
- 2× AFL All-Star (1968, 1969)

Career NFL/AFL statistics
- Fumble recoveries: 7
- Interceptions: 2
- Sacks: 8.5
- Stats at Pro Football Reference

Garland Dean Boyette (March 22, 1940 – April 19, 2022) was an American professional football player who was a linebacker in the American Football League (AFL) and National Football League (NFL). He played for the Houston Oilers and St. Louis Cardinals from 1962 to 1972. He also played for the Montreal Alouettes of the Canadian Football League (CFL), as well as the Houston Texans/Shreveport Steamer of the World Football League (WFL). In 1967, he was the regular starting middle linebacker for the Oilers and joined Willie Lanier of the Kansas City Chiefs as the first African Americans to start at that position in American professional football. He narrowly missed qualifying for the decathlon as part of the 1960 United States Olympic Team.

== Early life ==
Boyette was born in Rayville, Louisiana, on March 22, 1940. He attended Emma H. Wallace High School in Orange, Texas, graduating in 1958. He played on Wallace's football team under legendary head coach Willie Ray Smith Sr. As a junior in 1956, the 176 lb (79.8 kg) or 180 lb (81.6 kg) Boyette was a two-way player, originally intended to play primarily at defensive tackle, but then playing offensive tackle as well. As a senior, Boyette was a 185 lb (83.9 kg) two-way player again, playing offensive tackle and defensive end. Boyette also was a member of the school's basketball team, playing center; and threw the shot put on its track team.

== College career ==
He initially studied at Northwestern University, but left after the first semester and ultimately transferred to study biology at Grambling College—now Grambling State University—on the recommendation of his nephew, future All-AFL tackle Ernie Ladd. Boyette was in the starting lineup for the Grambling State Tigers football team during his sophomore year, as a two-way player. He played as a guard and defensive tackle, later receiving All-American honors at those positions. Boyette's line coach Leroy Hawthorne considered Boyette's work on the offensive line, "peerless".

Together with Ladd, Jerry Robinson, and Roosevelt Taylor, among others, he helped the Tigers finish 9–1 during the 1960 season, with the team recording three shutouts and scoring over 60 points on three occasions. The school went on to win its first Southwestern Athletic Conference (SWAC) championship that year. He won Little All-America honors in 1961, on a Grambling team that included Robinson, Taylor and future Professional Football Hall of Famers tackle Buch Buchanan and defensive back Willie Brown, among others. He was also named first-team All-SWAC in 1961. The Pittsburgh Courier named Boyette to its 1961 All-American team among players from HBCU schools.

Boyette was also a track and field athlete who was selected as an All-American three times. He was a three-time SWAC shot put champion. He competed in the 1960 United States Olympic trials and narrowly missed qualifying for the decathlon. He identified the pole vault and long-distance running as the most challenging events for him, stating he "never felt safe on that aluminum pole". Boyette set an NAIA shot put record in 1961 (53 ft 10.5 in/16.42 m), that was broken two years later by future AFL linebacker Rich Jackson of Southern University.

== Professional career ==
Upon graduating in 1962, Boyette was left undrafted in that year's NFL draft. He eventually signed with the St. Louis Cardinals in February 1962, with the expectation that he would become a linebacker. He learned the position over the summer of 1962. Boyette made his NFL debut with the Cardinals in 1962, and played in 14 games during his first season.

Boyette began the 1962 season as a reserve linebacker and special teams player. Dale Meinert was the Cardinals starting middle linebacker in 1962, but was injured in the fifth game of the season, and was out for the year. Cardinals defensive end Ed Henke was moved to middle linebacker to replace Meinert, but Henke was also injured that season. Head coach Wally Lemm then used Ted Bates at middle linebacker, when Bates returned from an injured broken leg. Lemm eventually assigned the rookie Boyette to start at linebacker late in his rookie season.

It has been indicated that Boyette started six games at middle linebacker in his rookie season by Pro Football Reference in one source. Other Pro Football Reference sources indicate that Boyette did not start any games at middle linebacker, rather stating that Meinert started five games at middle linebacker for the Cardinals that season, Henke four, and that Bates started five games at middle linebacker.

In 1963, Boyette appeared in nine games, none as a starter. He suffered a torn knee ligament in an early October 1963 game against the Minnesota Vikings. After two seasons with the St. Louis franchise, Boyette left for the Canadian Football League, having become disillusioned by the higher salary of newer NFL players compared to his. He subsequently played for the Montreal Alouettes from 1964 to 1965, winning the league's Most Valuable Player Award and being selected as an All-Canadian during the latter season.

Boyette went back to the American football in 1966, signing with the American Football League's Houston Oilers. This reunited Boyette with Wally Lemm, his former Cardinals' coach, and his nephew and former Grambling teammate Ernie Ladd. Boyette appeared in 14 games, starting at least one game at right defensive end (playing alongside Ladd at right defensive tackle). Before the 1967 season started, Lemm made the decision to make Boyette the Oilers' middle linebacker. Boyette started all 14 games at middle linebacker, playing between George Webster (left linebacker) and Olen Underwood (right linebacker). Boyette had two quarterback sacks that season. The Oilers finished first in the AFL's East Division with a 9–4–1 record and reached the AFL championship game, losing to the Oakland Raiders, 40–7.

Boyette started all 14 games at middle linebacker for the Oilers in 1968, with one interception and two sacks. He was selected to play in the AFL All-Star Game for the first time. In 1969, Boyette started all 14 games as the Oilers' middle linebacker for the third consecutive season, with a fumble recovery that season. He was again selected to play in the AFL All-Star Game. The Oilers lost to the Raiders in the first round of the playoffs, 56–7 that season. In 1970, he started 13 games as the Oilers' middle linebacker, with one interception.

During the 1971 season, he again started all 14 games at middle linebacker. He had four fumble recoveries, one of which he returned for a touchdown; and 1.5 sacks. Boyette finished sixth in the league in fumbles recovered (4), ninth in non-offensive touchdowns (1), and tied for most fumble return touchdowns (1). Ron Pritchard took over as the Oilers' starting middle linebacker in 1972, but was traded during the season, as was Webster, in an attempt to improve the Oilers' weak offense and 1–6 record. Boyette replaced Pritchard at starting middle linebacker in 1972.

Boyette retired in early 1973, and immediately was hired by the Oilers to work as the team's quality control director/quality control coach, focusing on extensive film review. Boyette was hired by general manager Sid Gillman. As a future Hall of Fame coach, Gillman had pioneered the use of film study, to which he showed extraordinary dedication and reliance over decades. General manager Gillman and head coach Bill Peterson saw Boyette's experience, dedication, and capabilities making him well suited for the job.

While he came into the 1973 Oilers' training camp as a coach, because of the team's needs on defense he was induced to return to playing linebacker in August 1973. Boyette came out of retirement during the Oilers' 1973 training camp, but did not play another season for the Oilers. He suffered a knee injury in training camp that kept him from playing at all in the 1973 season; nor did he return as a coach.

After two seasons, he returned to play for the Houston Texans of the World Football League. Midway through the 1974 season, the Texans relocated to Shreveport and were renamed the Steamer. Boyette finished his career with the Shreveport Steamer in 1975, at the age of 35.

== Legacy and honors ==
Boyette was recognized as one of the first two African Americans to start at middle linebacker in professional football, together with Willie Lanier (who made his NFL debut in 1967), and later recounted receiving hate mail as a result.

Boyette was inducted into the Grambling Legends Sports Hall of Fame in July 2010. Six years later, he was enshrined into the SWAC Hall of Fame. He was also honored in the Sports Legends Gallery at the Museum of the Gulf Coast.

== Personal life and death ==
Boyette was married to Winetta, with whom he had three children. He was the uncle of Paul Boyette Jr., who played for the Texas Longhorns and also went undrafted before signing with the Oakland Raiders in 2017. After retiring from professional football, Boyette was employed as a manager for Southwestern Bell for 28 years. He worked in that capacity until retiring in the early 2000s, after which he served as a motivational speaker, as well as a volunteer with the Boys & Girls Club in Houston and the Special Olympics. He resided in Missouri City, Texas, during his later years in a house that he constructed. Boyette attended the Bayou Classic annually in his retirement.

Boyette died on the evening of April 19, 2022, in Houston, aged 82.

== See also ==
- List of American Football League players
