= Willie Parker (defensive tackle) =

American football player (1945–2025)

No. 74
- Position: Defensive tackle

Personal information
- Born: March 12, 1945; Bastrop, Louisiana, U.S.
- Died: September 6, 2025 (aged 80); Bastrop, Louisiana, U.S.
- Listed height: 6 ft 3 in (1.91 m)
- Listed weight: 275 lb (125 kg)

Career information
- High school: Morehouse (Bastrop)
- College: Arkansas–Pine Bluff (1963–1966)
- NFL draft: 1967: 5th round, 118th overall pick

Career history
- Houston Oilers (1967–1970); Houston Texans/Shreveport Steamer (1974–1975)

Career NFL/AFL statistics
- Fumble recoveries: 2
- Sacks: 11
- Stats at Pro Football Reference

Willie David Parker (March 12, 1945 – September 6, 2025) was an American professional football player who was a defensive tackle for four seasons with the Houston Oilers of the American Football League (AFL) and National Football League (NFL). He was selected by the Oilers in the fifth round of the 1967 NFL/AFL draft after playing college football for the Arkansas–Pine Bluff Golden Lions. He was also a member of the Houston Texans/Shreveport Steamer of the World Football League (WFL).

== Early life and college ==
Willie David Parker was born on March 12, 1945, in Bastrop, Louisiana. He played high school football at Morehouse High School in Bastrop, earning all-state honors as both a junior and senior. He graduated in 1963.

Parker attended the University of Arkansas at Pine Bluff, where he played for the Golden Lions from 1963 to 1966. He was inducted into the University of Arkansas at Pine Bluff Sports Hall of Fame in 2018.

== Professional career ==
Parker was selected by the Houston Oilers in the fifth round, with the 118th overall pick of the 1967 NFL/AFL draft. He played in all 14 games, starting ten, for the Oilers during his rookie year in 1967 and recorded two sacks. He also started one playoff game that season. Parker started all 14 games in 1968, totaling two sacks, as the Oilers finished with a 7–7 record. He played in 12 games, starting two, during the 1969 season, recording three sacks and one fumble recovery. He also appeared in one playoff game that year. Parker started all 14 games during his final season with the Oilers in 1970, totaling four sacks and one fumble recovery, as the Oilers went 3–10–1. He was released in 1971.

Parker signed with the Houston Texans of the upstart World Football League in 1974. He was a member of the Houston Texans/Shreveport Steamer during the 1974 and 1975 seasons.

== Personal life ==
Parker was a police officer in the Bastrop Police Department from 1977 to 2010, retiring with the rank of captain. He died on September 6, 2025, at the age of 80.
