= Mac Haik =

American football player (born 1946)

No. 86
- Position: Wide receiver

Personal information
- Born: January 19, 1946 (age 80); Meridian, Mississippi, U.S.
- Listed height: 6 ft 1 in (1.85 m)
- Listed weight: 195 lb (88 kg)

Career information
- High school: Meridian
- College: Ole Miss (1964–1967)
- NFL draft: 1968: 2nd round, 49th overall pick

Career history
- Houston Oilers (1968–1971)

Awards and highlights
- Second-team All-SEC (1967)

Career NFL/AFL statistics
- Receptions: 76
- Receiving yards: 1,149
- Touchdowns: 9
- Stats at Pro Football Reference

Joseph Michael Haik (born January 19, 1946) is an American football player who played wide receiver for four seasons for the Houston Oilers in the American Football League (AFL) from 1968 to 1969 and the National Football League (NFL) from 1970 to 1971. He is CEO/Chairman of Mac Haik Enterprises which owns land, restaurants, commercial office buildings and a chain of automobile dealerships. Haik is of Lebanese American descent.
