= Elbert Drungo =

American football player (1943–2014)

No. 75, 79
- Positions: Guard, Tackle

Personal information
- Born: April 30, 1943; Columbus, Mississippi, U.S.
- Died: October 11, 2014 (aged 71); Hermitage, Tennessee, U.S.
- Listed height: 6 ft 5 in (1.96 m)
- Listed weight: 265 lb (120 kg)

Career information
- High school: Columbus (MS) R. E. Hunt
- College: Tennessee State
- NFL draft: 1969: 3rd round, 65th overall pick

Career history
- Houston Oilers (1969–1977); Buffalo Bills (1978)

Career NFL/AFL statistics
- Games played: 120
- Games started: 91
- Fumble recoveries: 9
- Stats at Pro Football Reference

Elbert J. Drungo Jr. (April 30, 1943 – October 11, 2014) was an American professional football offensive lineman for one season in the American Football League (AFL) for the Houston Oilers, then seven more seasons with the Oilers in the National Football League (NFL). He finished his career with the Buffalo Bills. Drungo played college football at Tennessee State University 4.

== Personal life and death ==
In 1972, Drungo married Deborah L. McMichael, and to this union, one child was born, Mary Evelyn Drungo. "Drungo" had a strong faith in God, and was a dedicated member of Lake Providence Missionary Baptist Church. 3

He taught at Fisk University for four years and then joined the Davidson County Sheriff's Department in Tennessee and later retired as a Lieutenant. [2]

On October 11, 2014, Drungo died of cancer in Nashville, Tennessee.
