= Ron Pritchard =

American football player and professional wrestler (born 1947)

No. 58, 60
- Position: Linebacker

Personal information
- Born: April 2, 1947 (age 79); Chicago, Illinois, U.S.
- Listed height: 6 ft 1 in (1.85 m)
- Listed weight: 235 lb (107 kg)

Career information
- High school: Antioch (Antioch, California)
- College: Arizona State
- NFL draft: 1969: 1st round, 15th overall pick

Career history
- Houston Oilers (1969–1972); Cincinnati Bengals (1972–1977)

Awards and highlights
- First-team All-American (1968)

Career NFL/AFL statistics
- Fumble recoveries: 4
- Interceptions: 3
- Safeties: 1
- Sacks: 16.5
- Stats at Pro Football Reference
- College Football Hall of Fame

Ronald David Pritchard (born April 2, 1947) is an American former professional football player and professional wrestler. Pritchard played football for nine seasons as a linebacker with the Houston Oilers and the Cincinnati Bengals, first in the American Football League (AFL), then in the National Football League (NFL).

== Early life and college football ==
Pritchard was born in Chicago, Illinois, but grew up in Antioch, California. He attended Antioch High School, where he played for the American football team as a linebacker. In his senior year, Pritchard was an All-County, All-League, All-Metropolitan, All-Northern California and an Honorable Mention All-America selection. He was also the East Bay Football Player of the Year.

He went on to attend Arizona State University, where he continued to play football, and in 1968 played in the College All-Star game, the Hula Bowl, the Senior Bowl, and the East-West Shrine Game. He was picked as the East-West Shrine Game's top defensive player. In 2003, he was inducted into the College Football Hall of Fame. While in Phoenix, Arizona, Pritchard worked as a bouncer with Wayne Coleman, who later wrestled as "Superstar" Billy Graham.

== American Football League ==
Pritchard was selected in the first round with the 15th overall pick for the Houston Oilers of the American Football League. He played for the Oilers for three seasons, before moving to the Cincinnati Bengals.

== Professional wrestling career ==
Pritchard began wrestling following his first year with the Oilers, when he was visiting his friend Bob Lueck, a football player and wrestler, in Calgary, Alberta, Canada, and was introduced to Stu Hart. Hart trained Pritchard and a week later, Pritchard wrestled his first match against Hart. Pritchard only wrestled during the off-season from football, and wrestled all over the United States, including in San Francisco for Roy Shire and Detroit for The Sheik. He wrestled against people including Ray Stevens, Pat Patterson and Superstar Billy Graham. In 1981, Pritchard wrestled his last matches for a Christian wrestling promotion in Arizona.

== Later careers ==
Following his retirement from football and wrestling, Pritchard worked as the athletic director for a Christian school for five years, and now coaches football at Valley Christian High School in Chandler.

== Personal life ==
Pritchard is a Christian. He is married, and as of 2011 has five grandchildren.

Pritchard had a knee replacement surgery, and requires surgery for his shoulder. After offering to donate his kidney to Coleman, Pritchard underwent an MRI which discovered a cancerous tumour on his kidney.

== See also ==
- List of American Football League players
- List of gridiron football players who became professional wrestlers
