= Woody Campbell (American football) =

American football player (born 1944)

No. 35
- Position: Running back

Personal information
- Born: September 26, 1944 (age 82); Mount Pleasant, Florida, U.S.
- Listed height: 5 ft 10 in (1.78 m)
- Listed weight: 204 lb (93 kg)

Career information
- High school: Carter-Parramore (Quincy, Florida)
- College: Northwestern
- NFL draft: 1967: 10th round, 242nd overall pick

Career history
- Houston Oilers (1967–1971)

Awards and highlights
- AFL All-Star (1967)

Career NFL/AFL statistics
- Rushing yards: 1,493
- Rushing average: 3.7
- Receptions: 80
- Receiving yards: 709
- Total touchdowns: 15
- Stats at Pro Football Reference

Woodrow Lamar Campbell (born September 26, 1944) is an American former professional football player who was a running back for the Houston Oilers of the American Football League (AFL) and National Football League (NFL). He was an AFL All-Star in 1967.

Campbell served as a military policeman in the 1st Infantry Division of the United States Army during the Vietnam War.

== See also ==
- Other American Football League players
