= Roy Hopkins (American football) =

American football player (1945–1996)

Roy Lee Hopkins
Profile
- Positions: Fullback, running back

Personal information
- Born: February 18, 1945; Gilmer, Texas, U.S.
- Died: November 29, 1996 (aged 51); Harris County, Texas, U.S.
- Listed height: 6 ft 1 in (1.85 m)
- Listed weight: 233 lb (106 kg)

Career information
- High school: Bruce (TX)
- College: Texas Southern
- NFL draft: 1967: 2nd round, 49th overall pick

Career history
- Houston Oilers (1967-1970)

Career NFL statistics
- Games: 53
- Games started: 15
- Stats at Pro Football Reference

Roy Lee Hopkins (February 28, 1945 – November 29, 1996) was an American professional football fullback and running back.

Hopkins was born in Gilmer, Texas, in 1945. He attended Bruce High School in that city and played college football at Texas Southern.

Hopkins played professional football in the American Football League (AFL) and National Football League (NFL) for the Houston Oilers from 1967 to 1970. He appeared in a total of 53 AFL and NFL games, 15 of them as a starter, totaling 826 rushing yards, 529 receiving yards, and 48 points scored. He sustained a torn cartilage in his knee during the 1970 season and underwent surgery in July 1971 to repair the damage.
