= Olen Underwood =

American football player (1942–2025)

No. 54, 56, 50
- Positions: Linebacker, Defensive end

Personal information
- Born: May 25, 1942; Holly Grove, Texas, U.S.
- Died: February 28, 2025 (aged 82); Conroe, Texas, U.S.
- Listed height: 6 ft 1 in (1.85 m)
- Listed weight: 220 lb (100 kg)

Career information
- High school: Channelview (TX)
- College: Texas
- NFL draft: 1965: 14th round, 183rd overall pick

Career history
- New York Giants (1965); Houston Oilers (1966-1970); Denver Broncos (1971)

Awards and highlights
- National champion (1963); First-team All-SWC (1964); SWC Conference Champion - (1962, 1963); 1964 Cotton Bowl Classic Champion; 1965 Orange Bowl Champion

Career NFL/AFL statistics
- Fumble recoveries: 5
- Interceptions: 5
- Sacks: 8.5
- Stats at Pro Football Reference

Olen Ulesus Underwood (May 25, 1942 – February 28, 2025) was an American professional football player and judge. He played as a linebacker in the National Football League (NFL) and American Football League (AFL). He played college football for the Texas Longhorns.

Underwood played defensive end at the University of Texas at Austin from 1962 to 1964. He helped the Longhorns win the National Championship in 1963 and was a first-team all-Southwest Conference selection in 1964, when the Longhorns upset #1 Alabama in the 1965 Orange Bowl and finished ranked 5th.

In 2003 he was named to the Texas Longhorn Hall of Honor.

He was selected and signed by the New York Giants in the 14th round of the 1965 NFL draft with the 183rd overall pick. He played linebacker for the Giants for one year, but didn't finish the season following a knee injury. He then played the same position in the AFL for the Houston Oilers, after a brief time on the Atlanta Falcons roster, from 1966 through 1969, including the 1967 AFL Championship Game. He stayed with the Oilers after the NFL-AFL merger, but in 1971 he played for the Denver Broncos.

While he was still in the NFL, Underwood attended law school at the University of Houston, and after his NFL career was over he started practicing law in the Houston area.

In 1981, Bill Clements appointed Underwood to the bench of the newly created 284th District Court for the State of Texas, a position he held until 2005, winning re-election six times without ever having an opponent.

In 1996, he was appointed by then Governor George W. Bush to be the presiding judge of the Second Administrative Judicial Region of Texas. He has been re-appointed to that position many times since then.

Underwood's daughter, Nancilea Foster competed in diving at the 2008 Summer Olympics. Underwood died on February 28, 2025.

== See also ==
- Other American Football League players
