= Pat Holmes =

American football player (1940–2026)

No. 75, 60, 18, 79, 74
- Position: Defensive lineman

Personal information
- Born: August 3, 1940; Durant, Oklahoma, U.S.
- Died: June 16, 2026 (aged 85)
- Listed height: 6 ft 5 in (1.96 m)
- Listed weight: 255 lb (116 kg)

Career information
- College: Texas Tech
- NFL draft: 1962: 3rd round, 40th overall pick

Career history
- Calgary Stampeders (1962–1965); Houston Oilers (1966–1972); Kansas City Chiefs (1973)

Awards and highlights
- 2× AFL All-Star (1967, 1968); All-AFL (1967); CFL All-Star (1965); CFL Western All-Star (1965)

Career NFL/AFL statistics
- Fumble recoveries: 6
- Interceptions: 1
- Sacks: 30
- Stats at Pro Football Reference

James Patrick Holmes (August 3, 1940 – June 16, 2026) was an American professional football player who was a defensive lineman in the Canadian Football League (CFL), American Football League (AFL), and National Football League (NFL).

Holmes played college football for the Texas Tech Red Raiders. Although selected by the Philadelphia Eagles of the NFL in 1962 NFL draft, Holmes began his professional career in CFL. He played for the Calgary Stampeders from 1962 to 1965.

He then played for the Houston Oilers in the AFL from 1966 to 1969. He was an AFL All-Star in 1967 and 1968. After the AFL–NFL merger in 1970, Holmes remained with the Oilers until 1972. Holmes played his last season with the 1973 Kansas City Chiefs.

Holmes died on June 16, 2026, at the age of 85.

== See also ==
- Other American Football League players
