= Ken Houston =

American football player and coach (born 1944)

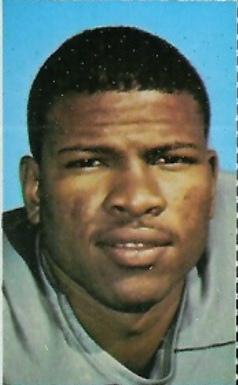
- Houston in 1969

No. 29, 27
- Position: Safety

Personal information
- Born: November 12, 1944 (age 81); Lufkin, Texas, U.S.
- Listed height: 6 ft 3 in (1.91 m)
- Listed weight: 197 lb (89 kg)

Career information
- High school: Dunbar (Lufkin)
- College: Prairie View A&M (1963–1966)
- NFL draft: 1967: 9th round, 214th overall pick

Career history
- Houston Oilers (1967–1972); Washington Redskins (1973–1980)

Awards and highlights
- 2× First-team All-Pro (1975, 1978); 10× Second-team All-Pro (1968–1974, 1976, 1977, 1979); 12× Pro Bowl (1968–1979); NFL 75th Anniversary All-Time Team; NFL 100th Anniversary All-Time Team; First-team NFL 1970s All-Decade Team; Titans/Oilers Ring of Honor; 80 Greatest Redskins; Washington Commanders Ring of Fame; Texas Sports Hall of Fame; Houston Sports Hall of Fame; NFL record: Most defensive touchdowns in a season: 5 (tied with DaRon Bland)

Career NFL statistics
- Games played: 196
- Interceptions: 49
- Interception return yards: 898
- Fumble recoveries: 21
- Touchdowns: 12
- Stats at Pro Football Reference
- Pro Football Hall of Fame

Kenneth Ray Houston (born November 12, 1944) is an American former professional football player who was a safety in the American Football League (AFL) and National Football League (NFL). He was inducted into the Pro Football Hall of Fame in 1986.

Houston played for the AFL's Houston Oilers from 1967 through 1969, and after the AFL–NFL merger, with the Oilers from 1970 through 1972, then with the Washington Redskins until 1980.

== Early life ==
Houston was born in Lufkin, Texas and was the third of four children. His father, Herod, owned a dry cleaning business. Houston attended Dunbar High School where he played basketball and football.

== College career ==
The only school that recruited Houston after high school was Prairie A&M College (now Prairie View A&M University). Bishop College initially offered him a scholarship, but then withdrew it. (The school had yet to be desegregated.)

Houston attended and played college football at Prairie View A&M College (Prairie View A & M University]. For a short time he was a center, and then became the starting linebacker and was selected All-American in the Southwestern Athletic Conference.

Houston also ran track, and was on the swim team during the four years he was at Prairie View.

== Professional career ==
Houston was an all-league free safety player for twelve consecutive years: an American Football League All-Star in 1968 and 1969, and then in the AFC-NFC Pro Bowl from 1970 through 1979. He was selected All-Pro three times. In 1999, he was ranked number 61 on The Sporting News' list of the 100 Greatest Football Players.

Throughout his career, he had an extraordinary ability to know where the ball was going. Houston intercepted 49 passes, recovered 21 fumbles, gained 1,498 return yards (on interception, fumble, blocked field goal, kickoff, and punt returns), and scored 12 touchdowns. He is a member of the 1986 class of the Pro Football Hall of Fame.

=== Houston Oilers ===
Houston was drafted in the ninth round of the 1967 NFL/AFL draft by the Houston Oilers of the American Football League. He became a starter by the third game of his rookie season. Two weeks later, in a game against the New York Jets, he scored two touchdowns, one on a 71-yard (65 m) blocked field goal attempt, and the other on a 43-yard (39 m) interception return.

In 1971 he set an NFL record with five touchdown returns (four interceptions and one fumble). This would stand until surpassed by Devin Hester's six return touchdowns in the 2006 season. His defensive touchdown record was unequaled until it was tied by DaRon Bland in 2023.

=== Washington Redskins ===
After six years with the Oilers, Houston was traded to the Washington Redskins for five veteran players in 1973. Included in the trade were offensive lineman Jim Snowden, tight end Mack Alston, wide receiver Clifton McNeil, defensive end Mike Fanucci, and defensive back Jeff Severson. While with the Redskins, Houston went to seven straight Pro Bowls.

== Coaching career ==
After his retirement in 1980, Houston served as a head football coach for Wheatley High School and Westbury High School in Houston, Texas. From 1982 to 1985, he was the defensive backfield coach for the Houston Oilers and from 1986 to 1990 he was the defensive backfield coach for the University of Houston.

== After football ==
Since 1990, Houston has served as a guidance counselor for children in hospitals and who are home-bound or have been placed in child care agencies by the State of Texas. He does this work for the Houston Independent School District.

== Personal ==
Houston has a wife, Gustie, a daughter, Kene; and a son, Kenneth Christian.
