= 1986 Houston Oilers season =

NFL team season

- Owner: Bud Adams
- General manager: Ladd Herzeg
- Head coach: Jerry Glanville
- Home stadium: Houston Astrodome

Results
- Record: 5–11
- Division place: 4th AFC Central
- Playoffs: Did not qualify

The 1986 Houston Oilers season was the 27th season overall and 17th with the National Football League (NFL). The team matched their previous season's output of 5–11, and missed the playoffs for the sixth consecutive season.

== Offseason ==
=== NFL draft ===
1986 Houston Oilers draft
Round	Pick	Player	Position	College	Notes
1	3	Jim Everett *	Quarterback	Purdue	
Made roster * Made at least one Pro Bowl during career

== Personnel ==
=== Staff/Coaches ===
1986 Houston Oilers staff
Front office: Owner/Chairman of the Board/President – Bud Adams; Executive Vice President/General Manager – Ladd Herzeg; Head coaches: Head coach – Jerry Glanville; Offensive coaches: Offensive coordinator/Running Backs – Dick Jamieson; Quarterbacks – Gary Huff; Receivers – Milt Jackson; Offensive Line – Bill Walsh	Defensive coaches: Defensive Line – Doug Shively; Linebackers – Floyd Reese; Secondary – Tom Bettis; Special teams coaches: Special Teams – Miller McCalmon; Strength and conditioning: Strength and Rehabilitation – Steve Watterson

=== Roster ===
1986 Houston Oilers roster
Quarterbacks (QB): 10 Oliver Luck; 1 Warren Moon; 18 John Witkowski; Running backs (RB): 36 Chuck Banks; 32 Stan Edwards; 39 Hubie Oliver; 20 Allen Pinkett; Wide receivers (WR): 86 Mike Akiu; 82 Willie Drewrey; 81 Ernest Givins; 85 Drew Hill; 83 Tim Smith; Tight ends (TE): 88 Chris Dressel; 87 Jamie Williams	Offensive linemen (OL): 72 Kent Hill G; 78 Don Maggs G/T; 74 Bruce Matthews T; 76 Eric Moran G/T; 52 Jay Pennison C/G; 70 Dean Steinkuhler T; 69 Doug Williams G/T; Defensive linemen (DL): 75 Jesse Baker DE; 71 Richard Byrd DE; 79 Ray Childress DE; 95 William Fuller DE; 68 Mike Golic NT; 98 Lynn Madsen DE; 67 Karl Morgan NT	Linebackers (LB): 56 Robert Abraham ILB; 50 Kirk Dodge ILB; 51 Eric Fairs; 59 John Grimsley ILB; 93 Robert Lyles OLB; 91 Johnny Meads OLB; 53 Avon Riley ILB; Defensive backs (DB): 29 Patrick Allen CB; 25 Keith Bostic SS; 24 Steve Brown CB; 31 Jeff Donaldson FS; 22 Kenny Johnson FS; 23 Richard Johnson CB; 28 Allen Lyday SS; 26 Audray McMillian CB; Special teams (ST): 11 Lee Johnson P; 7 Tony Zendejas K	Reserve: 92 Tom Briehl LB (IR); 94 Frank Bush LB (IR); 21 Bo Eason S (IR); 58 Mike Kelley C (IR); 37 Rod Kush S (IR); 63 Mike Munchak G (IR); 89 Jeff Parks TE (IR); 55 Jim Romano C (IR); 33 Mike Rozier RB (IR); 99 Doug Smith NT (IR); 35 Ray Wallace RB (IR); 40 Butch Woolfolk RB (IR); Rookies in italics

== Schedule ==
Week	Date	Opponent	Result	Record	Venue	Attendance
1	September 7	at Green Bay Packers	**W** 31–3	1–0	Lambeau Field	54,065
2	September 14	**Cleveland Browns**	**L** 20–23	1–1	Astrodome	46,049
3	September 21	at Kansas City Chiefs	**L** 13–27	1–2	Arrowhead Stadium	43,699
4	September 28	**Pittsburgh Steelers**	**L** 16–22	1–3	Astrodome	42,001
5	October 5	at Detroit Lions	**L** 13–24	1–4	Pontiac Silverdome	41,960
6	October 12	Chicago Bears	**L** 7–20	1–5	Astrodome	46,026
7	October 19	at **Cincinnati Bengals**	**L** 28–31	1–6	Riverfront Stadium	53,844
8	October 26	Los Angeles Raiders	**L** 17–28	1–7	Astrodome	41,641
9	November 2	at Miami Dolphins	**L** 7–28	1–8	Miami Orange Bowl	43,804
10	November 9	**Cincinnati Bengals**	**W** 32–28	2–8	Astrodome	32,130
11	November 16	at **Pittsburgh Steelers**	**L** 10–21	2–9	Three Rivers Stadium	49,724
12	November 23	Indianapolis Colts	**W** 31–17	3–9	Astrodome	31,792
13	November 30	at **Cleveland Browns**	**L** 10–13	3–10	Cleveland Municipal Stadium	62,309
14	December 7	at San Diego Chargers	**L** 0–27	3–11	Jack Murphy Stadium	40,103
15	December 14	Minnesota Vikings	**W** 23–10	4–11	Astrodome	32,738
16	December 21	Buffalo Bills	**W** 16–7	5–11	Astrodome	31,409
Note: Intra-division opponents are in **bold** text.

== Standings ==
AFC Central
	W	L	T	PCT	DIV	CONF	PF	PA	STK
^{(1)} Cleveland Browns	12	4	0	.750	5–1	10–2	391	310	W5
Cincinnati Bengals	10	6	0	.625	3–3	7–5	409	394	W1
Pittsburgh Steelers	6	10	0	.375	3–3	4–8	307	336	L1
Houston Oilers	5	11	0	.313	1–5	3–9	274	329	W2
