= 1985 Houston Oilers season =

NFL team season

- Owner: Bud Adams
- General manager: Ladd Herzeg
- Head coach: Hugh Campbell (fired on December 9, 5-9 record); Jerry Glanville (interim, 0-2 record)
- Home stadium: Houston Astrodome

Results
- Record: 5–11
- Division place: 4th AFC Central
- Playoffs: Did not qualify

The 1985 Houston Oilers season was the 26th season overall and 16th with the National Football League. The team improved upon their previous season's output of 3–13, winning five games, but failed to qualify for the playoffs for the fifth consecutive season.

== Offseason ==
=== NFL draft ===
1985 Houston Oilers draft
Round	Pick	Player	Position	College	Notes
1	3	Ray Childress *	Defensive tackle	Texas A&M	
1	11	Richard Johnson	Defensive back	Wisconsin	
2	36	Richard Byrd	Defensive end	Southern Miss	
3	82	Mike Kelley	Center	Notre Dame	
4	87	Tom Briehl	Linebacker	Stanford	
5	133	Frank Bush	Linebacker	NC State	
5	138	Lee Johnson	Punter	BYU	
6	153	Joe Krakoski	Linebacker	Washington	
7	170	Mike Akiu	Wide receiver	Hawaii	
8	199	Chuck Thomas	Center	Oklahoma	
9	226	Steve Tasker *	Wide receiver	Northwestern	
10	255	Mike Golic	Defensive tackle	Notre Dame	
11	281	Willie Drewrey	Wide receiver	West Virginia	
12	311	Mark Vonder Haar	Defensive tackle	Minnesota	
Made roster * Made at least one Pro Bowl during career

=== Undrafted free agents ===
1985 undrafted free agents of note
Player	Position	College
Donnie Campbell	Quarterback	Kansas State
Jack Weil	Punter	Wyoming

== Personnel ==
=== Staff ===
1985 Houston Oilers staff
Front office: Owner/Chairman of the Board/President – Bud Adams; Executive Vice President/General Manager – Ladd Herzeg; Head coaches: Head Coach – Hugh Campbell; Offensive coaches: Offensive Coordinator – Joe Faragalli; Offensive Backs – Al Roberts; Receivers – Bruce Lemmerman; Offensive Line – Bill Walsh	Defensive coaches: Defensive Coordinator – Jerry Glanville; Defensive Line – Bob Padilla; Inside Linebackers – John Devlin; Outside Linebackers – Gene Gaines; Defensive Backs – Ken Houston; Special teams coaches: Special Teams – Gene Gaines; Strength and conditioning: Strength and Conditioning – Bill Allerheiligen

=== Roster ===
1985 Houston Oilers roster
Quarterbacks (QB): 10 Oliver Luck; 1 Warren Moon; Running backs (RB): 32 Stan Edwards; 30 Larry Moriarty; 33 Mike Rozier; 40 Butch Woolfolk; Wide receivers (WR): 82 Willie Drewrey; 85 Drew Hill; 83 Tim Smith; 84 Herkie Walls; Tight ends (TE): 88 Chris Dressel; 89 Mike McCloskey; 87 Jamie Williams	Offensive linemen (OL): 66 Pat Howell G; 58 Mike Kelley C/G; 74 Bruce Matthews T; 76 Eric Moran T; 63 Mike Munchak G; 55 Jim Romano C; 73 Harvey Salem T; 62 John Schuhmacher G; 70 Dean Steinkuhler T; Defensive linemen (DL): 75 Jesse Baker DE; 71 Richard Byrd DE; 79 Ray Childress DE; 72 Brian Sochia NT; 99 Doug Smith NT; 67 Mike Stensrud NT	Linebackers (LB): 56 Robert Abraham ILB; 92 Tom Briehl OLB; 94 Frank Bush OLB; 59 John Grimsley ILB; 93 Robert Lyles OLB; 53 Avon Riley ILB; Defensive backs (DB): 29 Patrick Allen CB; 25 Keith Bostic SS; 24 Steve Brown CB; 31 Jeff Donaldson SS; 21 Bo Eason FS; 23 Richard Johnson CB; 37 Rod Kush FS; 28 Allen Lyday CB; 26 Audray McMillian CB; Special teams (ST): 11 Lee Johnson P; 7 Tony Zendejas K	Reserve: 86 Mike Akiu WR (IR); 68 Mike Golic DE (IR); 97 Mike Johnson DE (IR); 91 Johnny Meads LB (IR); 80 Steve Tasker WR (IR); Rookies in italics

== Schedule ==
Week	Date	Opponent	Result	Record	Venue	Attendance
1	September 8	Miami Dolphins	**W** 26–23	1–0	Astrodome	47,656
2	September 15	at Washington Redskins	**L** 16–13	1–1	RFK Stadium	53,553
3	September 22	at **Pittsburgh Steelers**	**L** 0–20	1–2	Three Rivers Stadium	58,752
4	September 29	Dallas Cowboys	**L** 10–17	1–3	Astrodome	49,686
5	October 6	at Denver Broncos	**L** 20–31	1–4	Mile High Stadium	74,699
6	October 13	**Cleveland Browns**	**L** 6–21	1–5	Astrodome	38,386
7	October 20	**Cincinnati Bengals**	**W** 44–27	2–5	Astrodome	35,590
8	October 27	at St. Louis Cardinals	**W** 20–10	3–5	Busch Memorial Stadium	43,190
9	November 3	Kansas City Chiefs	**W** 23–20	4–5	Astrodome	41,238
10	November 10	at Buffalo Bills	**L** 0–20	4–6	Rich Stadium	21,881
11	November 17	**Pittsburgh Steelers**	**L** 7–30	4–7	Astrodome	45,977
12	November 24	San Diego Chargers	**W** 37–35	5–7	Astrodome	34,336
13	December 1	at **Cincinnati Bengals**	**L** 27–45	5–8	Riverfront Stadium	46,140
14	December 8	New York Giants	**L** 14–35	5–9	Astrodome	36,576
15	December 15	at **Cleveland Browns**	**L** 21–28	5–10	Cleveland Municipal Stadium	50,793
16	December 22	at Indianapolis Colts	**L** 16–34	5–11	Hoosier Dome	55,818
Note: Intra-division opponents are in **bold** text.

== Standings ==
AFC Central
	W	L	T	PCT	DIV	CONF	PF	PA	STK
^{(3)} Cleveland Browns	8	8	0	.500	4–2	7–5	287	294	L1
Cincinnati Bengals	7	9	0	.438	4–2	5–7	441	437	L2
Pittsburgh Steelers	7	9	0	.438	3–3	6–6	379	355	L1
Houston Oilers	5	11	0	.313	1–5	4–8	284	412	L4
