= 1984 Houston Oilers season =

NFL team season

- Owner: Bud Adams
- General manager: Ladd Herzeg
- Head coach: Hugh Campbell
- Home stadium: Houston Astrodome

Results
- Record: 3–13
- Division place: 4th AFC Central
- Playoffs: Did not qualify

The 1984 Houston Oilers season was the 25th season overall and 15th with the league. The team improved upon their previous season's output of 2–14, winning three games, but failed to qualify for the playoffs for the fourth consecutive season. With hopes of improving the offense the Oilers won the bidding war to sign CFL star and future Hall of Fame quarterback Warren Moon. However, with Earl Campbell in full decline, the Oilers decided to trade him to the Saints after a 1–5 start. The move would leave a gaping hole at running back, but it was the defense that was a greater weak spot as the Oilers finished with a 3–13 record, allowing 457 points on the season.

== Regular season ==
Despite acquiring CFL star Warren Moon at quarterback, the Oilers stumbled out of the gate, falling to 0–10 before picking up a 17–16 win on the road against the Kansas City Chiefs. The following week they beat the New York Jets 31–20. In that game Moon tossed two touchdown passes to Tim Smith and one to Herkie Walls. The Oilers defense intercepted a Ken O'Brien pass. They picked up their third and final win of the season in overtime against the Pittsburgh Steelers 23–20. Moon connected with tight end Chris Dressel for a touchdown, while Steelersʼ quarterback Mark Malone tossed two interceptions – one to rookie Bo Eason and the other to Willie Tullis. The Oilers finished the season in last place in the AFC Central with a 3–13 record.

== Offseason ==
The 1984 draft would yield some solid players for Houston. They selected Dean Steinkuhler in round one. They used their second round choice to draft Doug Smith out of Auburn, but he spurred the Oilers to sign with the Philadelphia Stars of the USFL. The draft also saw Houston land Johnny Meads, Jeff Donaldson, John Grimsley and Patrick Allen.

=== Transactions ===
- October 10, 1984: The Houston Oilers traded running back Earl Campbell to the New Orleans Saints in exchange for their top choice in the 1985 NFL draft.

=== NFL draft ===
The following players were selected in the 1984 NFL draft.

1984 Houston Oilers draft
Round	Pick	Player	Position	College	Notes
1	2	Dean Steinkuhler	Offensive tackle	Nebraska	
Made roster * Made at least one Pro Bowl during career

=== Supplemental draft ===
The following players were selected in the 1984 NFL supplemental draft.

1984 Houston Oilers draft
Round	Pick	Player	Position	College	Notes
1	2	Mike Rozier *	Running back	Nebraska	
2	29	Don Maggs	Tackle	Tulane	
3	58	Lynn Madsen	Defensive Tackle	Washington	
Made roster * Made at least one Pro Bowl during career

== Personnel ==
=== Staff ===
1984 Houston Oilers staff
Front office: Owner/Chairman of the Board/President – Bud Adams; Executive Vice President/General Manager – Ladd Herzeg; Head coaches: Head Coach – Hugh Campbell; Offensive coaches: Offensive Coordinator – Kay Dalton; Offensive Backs – Al Roberts; Receivers – Bruce Lemmerman; Offensive Line – Bill Walsh	Defensive coaches: Defensive Coordinator – Jerry Glanville; Defensive Line – Bob Padilla; Linebackers – John Devlin; Defensive Backs – Ken Houston; Special teams coaches: Special Teams – Gene Gaines; Strength and conditioning: Strength and Conditioning – Bill Allerheiligen

=== Roster ===
1984 Houston Oilers roster
Quarterbacks (QB): 10 Oliver Luck; 1 Warren Moon; 12 Brian Ransom; Running backs (RB): 35 Stan Edwards; 38 Willie Joyner; 30 Larry Moriarty; 35 Richard Williams; Wide receivers (WR): 81 Steve Bryant; 84 Mike Holston; 80 Eric Mullins; 85 Carl Roaches; 83 Tim Smith; 82 Herkie Walls; Tight ends (TE): 88 Chris Dressel; 89 Mike McCloskey; 87 Jamie Williams	Offensive linemen (OL): 66 Pat Howell G; 74 Bruce Matthews; 76 Eric Moran T; 63 Mike Munchak G; 55 Jim Romano C; 73 Harvey Salem T; 62 John Schuhmacher G; Defensive linemen (DL): 75 Jesse Baker DE; 78 Jerome Foster DE; 90 Bob Hamm DE; 97 Mike Johnson DE; 72 Brian Sochia NT; 67 Mike Stensrud NT	Linebackers (LB): 56 Robert Abraham ILB; 54 Gregg Bingham ILB; 52 Robert Brazile OLB; 59 John Grimsley ILB; 50 Daryl Hunt ILB; 57 Tim Joiner OLB; 93 Robert Lyles OLB; 91 Johnny Meads OLB; 53 Avon Riley OLB; 51 Ted Thompson ILB; Defensive backs (DB): 29 Patrick Allen CB; 25 Keith Bostic SS; 24 Steve Brown CB; 31 Jeff Donaldson FS; 21 Bo Eason FS; 27 Mike Kennedy SS; 26 Darryl Meadows SS; 20 Willie Tullis CB; Special teams (ST): 8 Joe Cooper K; 6 John James P	Reserve: 77 Doug France T (IR); 36 Carter Hartwig S (IR); 4 Florian Kempf K (IR); 28 Allen Lyday S (IR); 70 Dean Steinkuhler T (IR); 98 Mark Studaway DE (IR); Rookies in italics

== Regular season ==
=== Schedule ===
Week	Date	Opponent	Result	Record	Game site	NFL.com recap
1	September 2	Los Angeles Raiders	**L** 14–24	0–1	Astrodome	Recap
2	September 9	Indianapolis Colts	**L** 21–35	0–2	Astrodome	Recap
3	September 16	at San Diego Chargers	**L** 14–31	0–3	Jack Murphy Stadium	Recap
4	September 23	at Atlanta Falcons	**L** 10–42	0–4	Atlanta–Fulton County Stadium	Recap
5	September 30	New Orleans Saints	**L** 10–27	0–5	Astrodome	Recap
6	October 7	at **Cincinnati Bengals**	**L** 3–13	0–6	Riverfront Stadium	Recap
7	October 14	at Miami Dolphins	**L** 10–28	0–7	Miami Orange Bowl	Recap
8	October 21	San Francisco 49ers	**L** 21–34	0–8	Astrodome	Recap
9	October 28	**Cincinnati Bengals**	**L** 13–31	0–9	Astrodome	Recap
10	November 4	at **Pittsburgh Steelers**	**L** 7–35	0–10	Three Rivers Stadium	Recap
11	November 11	at Kansas City Chiefs	W 17–16	1–10	Arrowhead Stadium	Recap
12	November 18	New York Jets	**W** 20–31	2–10	Astrodome	Recap
13	November 25	at **Cleveland Browns**	**L** 10–27	2–11	Cleveland Stadium	Recap
14	December 2	**Pittsburgh Steelers**	**W** 23–20	3–11	Astrodome	Recap
15	December 9	at Los Angeles Rams	**L** 16–27	3–12	Anaheim Stadium	Recap
16	December 16	**Cleveland Browns**	**L** 20–27	3–13	Astrodome	Recap
Note: Intra-division opponents are in **bold** text.

=== Standings ===
AFC Central
	W	L	T	PCT	DIV	CONF	PF	PA	STK
^{(3)} Pittsburgh Steelers	9	7	0	.563	3–3	6–6	387	310	W2
Cincinnati Bengals	8	8	0	.500	5–1	6–6	339	339	W4
Cleveland Browns	5	11	0	.313	3–3	4–8	250	297	W1
Houston Oilers	3	13	0	.188	1–5	3–9	240	437	L2

=== Season summary ===
==== Week 2: vs. Indianapolis Colts ====
Week 2: Indianapolis Colts at Houston Oilers

Quarter	1	2	3	4	Total
Colts	0	21	7	7	**35**
Oilers	7	7	0	7	**21**

at Astrodome • Houston, Texas

- Date: September 9, 1984
- Game time: 3:00 p.m. EST
- Game attendance: 43,820
- Referee: Fred Wyant
- TV announcers (NBC): Phil Stone (play-by-play) and Reggie Rucker (color commentator)
- Pro-Football-Reference.com

Game information

Colts

Oilers

Scoring summary

Quarter	Time	Drive			Team	Scoring information	Score	
Quarter	Time	Plays	Yards	TOP	Team	Scoring information	IND	HOU
1					Oilers	Campbell 2-yard touchdown run, Kempf kick good	0	7
2					Colts	Pagel 1-yard touchdown run, Biasucci kick good	7	7
2					Oilers	Campbell 15-yard touchdown run, Kempf kick good	7	14
2					Colts	Dickey 15-yard touchdown run, Biasucci kick good	14	14
2					Colts	Butler 31-yard touchdown reception from Pagel, Biasucci kick good	21	14
3					Colts	Butler 14-yard touchdown reception from Pagel, Biasucci kick good	28	14
4					Oilers	Campbell 1-yard touchdown run, Kempf kick good	28	21
4					Colts	Porter 33-yard touchdown reception from Pagel, Biasucci kick good	35	21
"TOP" = time of possession. For other American football terms, see Glossary of American football.							35	21

==== Week 8 (Sunday, October 21, 1984): vs. San Francisco 49ers ====
Week 8: San Francisco 49ers at Houston Oilers

Quarter	1	2	3	4	Total
49ers (7–1)	10	7	3	14	**34**
Oilers (0–8)	0	7	7	7	**21**

at Houston Astrodome • Houston, Texas

- Date: October 21, 1984
- Game time: 3:00 p.m. CDT
- Game weather: indoors
- Game attendance: 39,900
- Referee: Gene Barth
- TV announcers (CBS): Tom Brookshier (play-by-play) and Wayne Walker (color commentator)

Team	Category	Player	Statistics
SF	Passing	Joe Montana	25/35, 353 YDS, 3 TDs, 1 INT
SF	Rushing	Wendell Tyler	23 CAR, 108 YDS
SF	Receiving	Dwight Clark	5 REC, 127 YDS, 1 TD
HOU	Passing	Warren Moon	25/33, 356 YDS, 2 TDs, 2 INTs
HOU	Rushing	Larry Moriarty	9 CAR, 36 YDS, 1 TD
HOU	Receiving	Tim Smith	6 REC, 101 YDS, 1 TD

Scoring summary

Quarter	Time	Drive			Team	Scoring information	Score	
Quarter	Time	Plays	Yards	TOP	Team	Scoring information	SF	HOU
1	9:56				49ers	Francis 11-yard touchdown reception from Montana, Wersching kick good	7	0
1	3:17				49ers	26-yard field goal by Wersching	10	0
2	14:49				Oilers	Moriarty 1-yard touchdown run, Kempf kick good	10	7
2	0:29				49ers	Tyler 26-yard touchdown reception from Montana, Wersching kick good	17	7
3	12:22				49ers	22-yard field goal by Wersching	20	7
3	5:42				Oilers	Smith 45-yard touchdown reception from Moon, Kemof kick good	20	14
4	7:50				49ers	Craig 5-yard touchdown run, Wersching kick good	27	14
4	5:18				Oilers	Williams 29-yard touchdown reception from Moon, Kempf kick good	27	21
4	5:00				49ers	Clark 80-yard touchdown reception from Montana, Wersching kick good	34	21
"TOP" = time of possession. For other American football terms, see Glossary of American football.							34	21

- Point spread: 49ers by 11
- Over/under: 42.0 **(over)**
- Time of game:

49ers	Game statistics	Oilers
25	First downs	22
38–164	Rushes–yards	18–82
353	Passing yards	356
25–35–1	Passes	25–33–2
1–0	Sacked–yards	2–6
353	Net passing yards	350
517	Total yards	432
85	Return yards	105
3–49.3	Punts	3–46.3
2–0	Fumbles–lost	3–1
8–70	Penalties–yards	7–75
34:13	Time of Possession	25:47

==== Week 15 ====
Week Fifteen: Houston Oilers (3–11) at Los Angeles Rams (9–5)

Quarter	1	2	3	4	Total
Oilers	3	10	3	0	**16**
**Rams**	17	3	0	7	**27**

at Anaheim Stadium, Anaheim, California

- Date: December 9, 1984
- Game time: 3:00 p.m. CST
- Game weather: Sunny, 58 °F or 14.4 °C
- Game attendance: 49,092
- Referee: Fred Silva
- TV: NBC
- Pro-Football-Reference.com, The Football Database

Game information

**First quarter**

- LA – Drew Hill 57-yard pass from Jeff Kemp (Mike Lansford kick), 13:08. Rams 7–0. Drive:
- HOU – Joe Cooper 21-yard field goal, 7:22. Rams 7–3. Drive:
- LA – Eric Dickerson 7-yard run (Mike Lansford kick), 4:28. Rams 14–3. Drive:
- LA – Mike Lansford 35-yard field goal, 1:42. Rams 17–3. Drive:

**Second quarter**

- HOU – Joe Cooper 42-yard field goal, 13:19. Rams 17–6. Drive:
- HOU – Larry Moriarty 4-yard run (Joe Cooper kick), 6:13. Rams 17–13. Drive:
- LA – Mike Lansford 19-yard field goal, 2:26. Rams 20–13. Drive:

**Third quarter**

- HOU – Joe Cooper 18 yard field goal, 7:50. Rams 20–16. Drive:

**Fourth quarter**

- LA – Eric Dickerson 6–yard run, 5:49. Rams 27–16. Drive:

Top passers

- HOU – Warren Moon – 19/29, 200 yards, INT
- LA – Jeff Kemp – 12/23, 199 yards, TD

Top rushers

- HOU – Larry Moriarty – 24 rushes, 102 yards, TD
- LA – Eric Dickerson – 27 rushes, 215 yards, 2 TD

Top receivers

- HOU – Tim Smith – 6 receptions, 69 yards
- LA – Drew Hill – 1 reception, 57 yards, TD
