= 1988 Houston Oilers season =

NFL team season

- Owner: Bud Adams
- General manager: Ladd Herzeg
- Head coach: Jerry Glanville
- Home stadium: Houston Astrodome

Results
- Record: 10–6
- Division place: 3rd AFC Central
- Playoffs: Won Wild Card Playoffs (at Browns) 24–23; Lost Divisional Playoffs (at Bills) 10–17
- Pro Bowlers: DT Ray Childress; LB John Grimsley; WR Drew Hill; G Bruce Matthews; QB Warren Moon; G Mike Munchak; RB Mike Rozier

Uniform
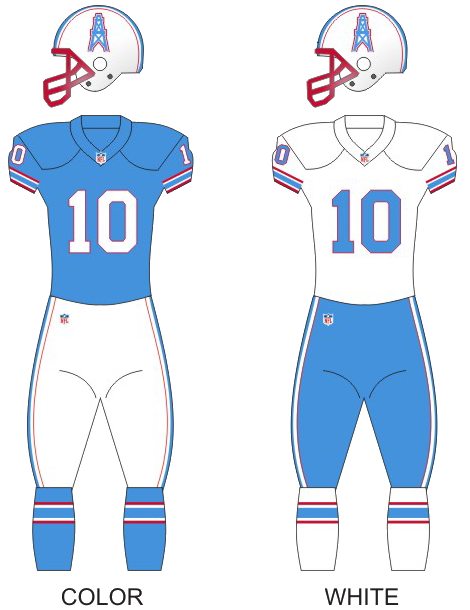

The 1988 Houston Oilers season was the franchise's 19th season in the National Football League and the 29th overall. The franchise scored 424 points, which was second in the AFC and second overall in the NFL. The defense gave up 365 points. Their record of 10 wins and 6 losses resulted in a third-place finish in the AFC Central Division. The Oilers appeared once on Monday Night Football and appeared in the playoffs for the second consecutive year. Warren Moon would be selected for the Pro Bowl. In the playoffs, they defeated the Cleveland Browns 24–23 in the Wild Card game. However, in the divisional playoffs they lost 17–10 to the Buffalo Bills.

== Offseason ==
=== NFL draft ===
1988 Houston Oilers draft
| Round | Pick | Player | Position | College | Notes |
| 1 | 22 | Lorenzo White * | Running back | Michigan State | |
| 2 | 48 | Quintin Jones | Safety | Pittsburgh | |
| 3 | 72 | Greg Montgomery * | Punter | Michigan State | |
| 5 | 125 | Cris Dishman * | Cornerback | Purdue | |
| 5 | 130 | Chris Verhulst | Tight end | Chico State | |
| 6 | 157 | Kurt Crain | Linebacker | Auburn | |
| 7 | 187 | Tracey Eaton | Safety | Portland State | |
| 8 | 214 | David Viaene | Offensive tackle | Minnesota–Duluth | |
| 9 | 241 | David Spradlin | Linebacker | TCU | |
| 10 | 271 | Mario Johnson | Wide receiver | Hawaii | |
| 11 | 298 | Jethro Franklin | Defensive line | Fresno State | |
| 12 | 325 | John Brantley | Linebacker | Georgia | |
Made roster * Made at least one Pro Bowl during career

== Personnel ==
1988 Houston Oilers staff
| Front office: Owner/Chairman of the Board/President – Bud Adams; Executive Vice President/General Manager – Ladd Herzeg; Head coaches: Head Coach – Jerry Glanville; Offensive coaches: Quarterbacks – June Jones; Running Backs – Ray Sherman; Receivers – Milt Jackson; Tight Ends – Richard Smith; Offensive Line – Kim Helton | Defensive coaches: Defensive Line – Doug Shively; Linebackers – Floyd Reese; Secondary – Nick Saban; Special teams coaches: Special Teams – Richard Smith; Special Teams Intern- Dwight Point; Strength and conditioning: Strength and Rehabilitation – Steve Watterson |

== Roster ==
1988 Houston Oilers roster
| Quarterbacks (QB): 14 Cody Carlson; 1 Warren Moon; 10 Brent Pease; Running backs (RB): 32 Alonzo Highsmith FB; 20 Allen Pinkett; 30 Mike Rozier; 33 Spencer Tillman; 44 Lorenzo White; Wide receivers (WR): 80 Curtis Duncan; 81 Ernest Givins; 83 Leonard Harris; 85 Drew Hill; 84 Haywood Jeffires; Tight ends (TE): 88 Chris Verhulst; 87 Jamie Williams | Offensive linemen (OL): 77 Bruce Davis T; 73 John Davis G; 78 Don Maggs G/T; 74 Bruce Matthews G; 63 Mike Munchak G; 52 Jay Pennison C; 70 Dean Steinkuhler T; 75 Vince Stroth G/T; Defensive linemen (DL): 97 Robert Banks DE; 71 Richard Byrd NT; 79 Ray Childress DE; 95 William Fuller DE; 96 Sean Jones DE; 99 Doug Smith NT | Linebackers (LB): 56 Toby Caston ILB; 51 Eric Fairs OLB; 59 John Grimsley ILB; 57 Walter Johnson OLB; 93 Robert Lyles OLB; 91 Johnny Meads OLB; 53 Eugene Seale ILB; 54 Al Smith ILB; Defensive backs (DB): 29 Patrick Allen CB; 25 Keith Bostic SS; 24 Steve Brown CB; 38 Domingo Bryant SS; 28 Cris Dishman CB; 31 Jeff Donaldson FS; 21 Tracey Eaton FS; 23 Richard Johnson CB; Special teams (ST): 9 Greg Montgomery P; 7 Tony Zendejas K | Reserve: -- Kurt Crain LB (IR); 82 Willie Drewrey WR (IR); -- Mark Dusbabek LB (IR); 22 Kenny Johnson S (IR); 27 Quintin Jones S (IR); 26 Audray McMillian CB (IR); -- David Viaene C/G (IR); 35 Ray Wallace RB (IR); 69 Doug Williams G (IR); -- Almon Young G (IR); 47 active, 10 inactive Rookies in italics |

== Regular season ==
=== Schedule ===
| Week | Date | Opponent | Result | Record | Venue | Attendance |
|---|---|---|---|---|---|---|
| 1 | September 4 | at Indianapolis Colts | **W** 17–14 (OT) | 1–0 | Hoosier Dome | 57,251 |
| 2 | September 11 | Los Angeles Raiders | **W** 38–35 | 2–0 | Astrodome | 46,050 |
| 3 | September 18 | at New York Jets | **L** 3–45 | 2–1 | Giants Stadium | 64,683 |
| 4 | September 25 | New England Patriots | **W** 31–6 | 3–1 | Astrodome | 38,646 |
| 5 | October 2 | at Philadelphia Eagles | **L** 23–32 | 3–2 | Veterans Stadium | 64,692 |
| 6 | October 9 | Kansas City Chiefs | **W** 7–6 | 4–2 | Astrodome | 39,134 |
| 7 | October 16 | at **Pittsburgh Steelers** | **W** 34–14 | 5–2 | Three Rivers Stadium | 52,229 |
| 8 | October 23 | at **Cincinnati Bengals** | **L** 21–44 | 5–3 | Riverfront Stadium | 54,659 |
| 9 | October 30 | Washington Redskins | **W** 41–17 | 6–3 | Astrodome | 48,781 |
| 10 | November 7 | **Cleveland Browns** | **W** 24–17 | 7–3 | Astrodome | 51,467 |
| 11 | November 13 | at Seattle Seahawks | **L** 24–27 | 7–4 | Kingdome | 60,446 |
| 12 | November 20 | Phoenix Cardinals | **W** 38–20 | 8–4 | Astrodome | 43,843 |
| 13 | November 24 | at Dallas Cowboys | **W** 25–17 | 9–4 | Texas Stadium | 50,845 |
| 14 | December 4 | **Pittsburgh Steelers** | **L** 34–37 | 9–5 | Astrodome | 47,791 |
| 15 | December 11 | **Cincinnati Bengals** | **W** 41–6 | 10–5 | Astrodome | 50,269 |
| 16 | December 18 | at **Cleveland Browns** | **L** 23–28 | 10–6 | Cleveland Municipal Stadium | 74,610 |
Note: Intra-division opponents are in **bold** text.

=== Season summary ===
==== Week 1 ====
Week 1: Houston Oilers at Indianapolis Colts

| Quarter | 1 | 2 | 3 | 4 | OT | Total |
|---|---|---|---|---|---|---|
| Oilers | 7 | 7 | 0 | 0 | 3 | **17** |
| Colts | 7 | 7 | 0 | 0 | 0 | **14** |

at Hoosier Dome • Indianapolis, Indiana

- Date: September 4, 1988
- Game time: 3:00 p.m. CDT
- Game attendance: 57,251
- Referee: Jerry Seeman
- TV announcers (NBC): Tom Hammond (play-by-play) and Jon Morris (color commentator)
- Pro-Football-Reference.com

Game information

Oilers

Colts

Scoring summary

| Quarter | Time | Drive | | | Team | Scoring information | Score | |
| Quarter | Time | Plays | Yards | TOP | Team | Scoring information | HOU | IND |
|---|---|---|---|---|---|---|---|---|
| "TOP" = time of possession. For other American football terms, see Glossary of American football. | | | | | | | 17 | 14 |

The game started at 4:00 PM on Sunday, September 4, 1988, in Hoosier Dome.

First Quarter:

- Touchdown, Gary Hogeboom to Matt Bouza, 23 yard pass (Indianapolis Colts).
- Touchdown, Steve Brown, 44 yard interception return (Houston Oilers).

Second Quarter:

- Touchdown, Albert Bentley, 1 yard rush (Indianapolis Colts).
- Touchdown, Mike Rozier, 1 yard rush (Houston Oilers).

Third Quarter: No points scored.

Fourth Quarter: No points scored.

Overtime:

- Field Goal, Tony Zendejas, 35 yard kick (Houston Oilers).

The game ended in overtime at 17-14, with the Houston Oilers on top.

==== Week 2 ====
Week 2: Los Angeles Raiders at Houston Oilers

| Quarter | 1 | 2 | 3 | 4 | Total |
|---|---|---|---|---|---|
| Raiders | 7 | 21 | 0 | 7 | **35** |
| Oilers | 7 | 14 | 3 | 14 | **38** |

at Astrodome • Houston, Texas

- Date: September 11, 1988
- Game time: 3:00 p.m. CDT
- Game attendance: 46,050
- Referee: Ben Dreith
- TV announcers (NBC): Ray Scott (play-by-play) and Joe Namath (color commentator) (blacked out locally)
- Pro-Football-Reference.com

Game information

Raiders

Oilers

Scoring summary

| Quarter | Time | Drive | | | Team | Scoring information | Score | |
| Quarter | Time | Plays | Yards | TOP | Team | Scoring information | LAR | HOU |
|---|---|---|---|---|---|---|---|---|
| "TOP" = time of possession. For other American football terms, see Glossary of American football. | | | | | | | 35 | 38 |

The game started at 4:00 PM on Sunday, September 11, 1988. The game was played at the Houston Astrodome. In the first quarter, Marcus Allen of the Raiders rushed one yard for a touchdown. That same quarter, Allen Pinkett of the Oilers rushed three yards for a touchdown. In the second quarter, Willie Gault of the Raiders received a 42-yard pass from Steve Beuerlein for a touchdown. In that quarter, Tim Brown of the Raiders also received a 4-yard pass from Steve Beuerlein for another touchdown. Allen Pinkett of the Oilers rushed for a one-yard touchdown in the same quarter, Steve Smith of the Raiders received a 9-yard pass from Steve Beuerlein in the same quarter, Drew Hill received a 16-yard pass from Cody Carlson of the Oilers for the fifth touchdown in that quarter between both teams. In the third quarter, Tony Zendejas kicked a 19-yard field goal for the Oilers. In the fourth quarter, Ernest Givins of the Oilers received a 12-yard touchdown pass from Cody Carlson. Also in that quarter, Marcus Allen of the Raiders rushed one yard for a touchdown. Allen Pinkett of the Oilers brought back the lead on that quarter, rushing 6 yards for a touchdown. Eventually, the game ended 38-35 with the Oilers on top, resulting in a win.

==== Week 3 ====
Week 3: Houston Oilers at New York Jets

| Quarter | 1 | 2 | 3 | 4 | Total |
|---|---|---|---|---|---|
| Oilers | 3 | 0 | 0 | 0 | **3** |
| Jets | 14 | 14 | 3 | 14 | **45** |

at Giants Stadium • East Rutherford, New Jersey

- Date: September 18, 1988
- Game time: 12 Noon CDT
- Game attendance: 64,683
- Referee: Bob McElwee
- TV announcers (NBC): Curt Gowdy (play-by-play) and Al DeRogatis (color commentator)
- Pro-Football-Reference.com

Game information

Oilers

Jets

Scoring summary

| Quarter | Time | Drive | | | Team | Scoring information | Score | |
| Quarter | Time | Plays | Yards | TOP | Team | Scoring information | HOU | NYJ |
|---|---|---|---|---|---|---|---|---|
| "TOP" = time of possession. For other American football terms, see Glossary of American football. | | | | | | | 3 | 45 |

The game started at 1:00 PM on Sunday, September 18, 1988. The game was played at Giants Stadium. In the first quarter, Tony Zendejas of the Oilers kicked a 30-yard field goal, scoring the only points of the game for the Oilers. Kurt Sohn of the New York Jets received a 8-yard pass from Ken O'Brien for a touchdown in the same quarter. Also in the first quarter, Freeman McNeil of the New York Jets rushed 8 yards for a touchdown. In the second quarter, Wesley Walker of the New York Jets received two touchdown passes from . Ken O'Brien, with the distances being 4-yards and 50-yards. In the third quarter, Pat Leahy of the Jets kicked a 47-yard field goal. In the fourth quarter, Wesley Walker received a 23-yard pass from Pat Ryan, resulting in a touchdown. Also in that quarter, Mike Zordich of the Jets intercepted a pass, and ran 35 yards for a touchdown. The final score was 45-3, with the New York Jets on top. This game was a loss for the Oilers.

==== Week 4 ====
Week 4: New England Patriots at Houston Oilers

| Quarter | 1 | 2 | 3 | 4 | Total |
|---|---|---|---|---|---|
| Patriots | 6 | 0 | 0 | 0 | **6** |
| Oilers | 7 | 7 | 7 | 10 | **31** |

at Astrodome • Houston, Texas

- Date: September 25, 1988
- Game time: 12 Noon CDT
- Game attendance: 38,646
- Referee: Red Cashion
- TV announcers (NBC): Mel Proctor (play-by-play) and Jerry Kramer (color commentator) (blacked out locally)
- Pro-Football-Reference.com

Game information

Patriots

Oilers

Scoring summary

| Quarter | Time | Drive | | | Team | Scoring information | Score | |
| Quarter | Time | Plays | Yards | TOP | Team | Scoring information | NE | HOU |
|---|---|---|---|---|---|---|---|---|
| "TOP" = time of possession. For other American football terms, see Glossary of American football. | | | | | | | 6 | 31 |

==== Week 5 ====
Week 5: Houston Oilers at Philadelphia Eagles

| Quarter | 1 | 2 | 3 | 4 | Total |
|---|---|---|---|---|---|
| Oilers | 16 | 0 | 0 | 7 | **23** |
| Eagles | 0 | 20 | 9 | 3 | **32** |

at Veterans Stadium • Philadelphia, Pennsylvania

- Date: October 2, 1988
- Game time: 12 Noon CDT
- Game attendance: 64,692
- Referee: Dick Jorgensen
- TV announcers (NBC): Mel Proctor (play-by-play) and Larry Csonka (color commentator)
- Pro-Football-Reference.com

Game information

Oilers

Eagles

Scoring summary

| Quarter | Time | Drive | | | Team | Scoring information | Score | |
| Quarter | Time | Plays | Yards | TOP | Team | Scoring information | HOU | PHI |
|---|---|---|---|---|---|---|---|---|
| "TOP" = time of possession. For other American football terms, see Glossary of American football. | | | | | | | 23 | 32 |

==== Week 6 ====
Week 6: Kansas City Chiefs at Houston Oilers

| Quarter | 1 | 2 | 3 | 4 | Total |
|---|---|---|---|---|---|
| Chiefs | 3 | 3 | 0 | 0 | **6** |
| Oilers | 0 | 0 | 7 | 0 | **7** |

at Astrodome • Houston, Texas

- Date: October 9, 1988
- Game time: 12 Noon CDT
- Game attendance: 39,134
- Referee: Fred Silva
- TV announcers (NBC): Jay Randolph (play-by-play) and Reggie Rucker (color commentator) (blacked out locally)
- Pro-Football-Reference.com

Game information

Chiefs

Oilers

Scoring summary

| Quarter | Time | Drive | | | Team | Scoring information | Score | |
| Quarter | Time | Plays | Yards | TOP | Team | Scoring information | KC | HOU |
|---|---|---|---|---|---|---|---|---|
| "TOP" = time of possession. For other American football terms, see Glossary of American football. | | | | | | | 6 | 7 |

==== Week 7 ====
Week 7: Houston Oilers at Pittsburgh Steelers

| Quarter | 1 | 2 | 3 | 4 | Total |
|---|---|---|---|---|---|
| Oilers | 6 | 12 | 7 | 9 | **34** |
| Steelers | 0 | 7 | 0 | 7 | **14** |

at Three Rivers Stadium • Pittsburgh, Pennsylvania

- Date: October 16, 1988
- Game time: 12 Noon CDT
- Game attendance: 52,229
- Referee: Jerry Markbreit
- TV announcers (NBC): Jay Randolph (play-by-play) and Reggie Rucker (color commentator)
- Pro-Football-Reference.com

Game information

Oilers

Steelers

Scoring summary

| Quarter | Time | Drive | | | Team | Scoring information | Score | |
| Quarter | Time | Plays | Yards | TOP | Team | Scoring information | HOU | PIT |
|---|---|---|---|---|---|---|---|---|
| "TOP" = time of possession. For other American football terms, see Glossary of American football. | | | | | | | 34 | 14 |

==== Week 8 ====
Week 8: Houston Oilers at Cincinnati Bengals

| Quarter | 1 | 2 | 3 | 4 | Total |
|---|---|---|---|---|---|
| Oilers | 0 | 7 | 14 | 0 | **21** |
| Bengals | 28 | 0 | 7 | 9 | **44** |

at Riverfront Stadium • Cincinnati, Ohio

- Date: October 23, 1988
- Game time: 12 Noon CDT
- Game attendance: 54,659
- Referee: Fred Wyant
- TV announcers (NBC): Charlie Jones (play-by-play) and Jimmy Cefalo (color commentator)
- Pro-Football-Reference.com

Game information

Oilers

Eagles

Scoring summary

| Quarter | Time | Drive | | | Team | Scoring information | Score | |
| Quarter | Time | Plays | Yards | TOP | Team | Scoring information | HOU | CIN |
|---|---|---|---|---|---|---|---|---|
| "TOP" = time of possession. For other American football terms, see Glossary of American football. | | | | | | | 21 | 44 |

==== Week 9 ====
Week 9: Washington Redskins at Houston Oilers

| Quarter | 1 | 2 | 3 | 4 | Total |
|---|---|---|---|---|---|
| Redskins | 0 | 3 | 7 | 7 | **17** |
| Oilers | 7 | 17 | 7 | 10 | **41** |

at Astrodome • Houston, Texas

- Date: October 30, 1988
- Game time: 7:00 p.m. CST
- Game attendance: 48,781
- Referee: Pat Haggerty
- TV announcers (ESPN): Mike Patrick (play-by-play) and Joe Theismann (color commentator)
- Pro-Football-Reference.com

Game information

Redskins

Oilers

Scoring summary

| Quarter | Time | Drive | | | Team | Scoring information | Score | |
| Quarter | Time | Plays | Yards | TOP | Team | Scoring information | WSH | HOU |
|---|---|---|---|---|---|---|---|---|
| "TOP" = time of possession. For other American football terms, see Glossary of American football. | | | | | | | 17 | 41 |

==== Week 10 ====
Week 10: Cleveland Browns at Houston Oilers

| Quarter | 1 | 2 | 3 | 4 | Total |
|---|---|---|---|---|---|
| Browns | 3 | 0 | 7 | 7 | **17** |
| Oilers | 0 | 7 | 14 | 3 | **24** |

at Astrodome • Houston, Texas

- Date: November 7, 1988
- Game time: 8:00 p.m. CST
- Game attendance: 51,467
- Referee: Tom Dooley
- TV announcers (ABC): Al Michaels (play-by-play), Dan Dierdorf (color commentator) and Frank Gifford (color commentator)
- Pro-Football-Reference.com

Game information

Browns

Oilers

Scoring summary

| Quarter | Time | Drive | | | Team | Scoring information | Score | |
| Quarter | Time | Plays | Yards | TOP | Team | Scoring information | CLE | HOU |
|---|---|---|---|---|---|---|---|---|
| "TOP" = time of possession. For other American football terms, see Glossary of American football. | | | | | | | 17 | 24 |

==== Week 11 ====
Week 11: Houston Oilers at Seattle Seahawks

| Quarter | 1 | 2 | 3 | 4 | Total |
|---|---|---|---|---|---|
| Oilers | 7 | 3 | 7 | 7 | **24** |
| Seahawks | 7 | 3 | 7 | 10 | **27** |

at Kingdome • Seattle, Washington

- Date: November 13, 1988
- Game time: 3:00 p.m. CST
- Game attendance: 60,446
- Referee: Dick Hantak
- TV announcers (NBC): Charlie Jones (play-by-play) and Jimmy Cefalo (sportscaster)
- Pro-Football-Reference.com

Game information

Oilers

Seahawks

Scoring summary

| Quarter | Time | Drive | | | Team | Scoring information | Score | |
| Quarter | Time | Plays | Yards | TOP | Team | Scoring information | HOU | SEA |
|---|---|---|---|---|---|---|---|---|
| "TOP" = time of possession. For other American football terms, see Glossary of American football. | | | | | | | 24 | 27 |

==== Week 12 ====
Week 12: Phoenix Cardinals at Houston Oilers

| Quarter | 1 | 2 | 3 | 4 | Total |
|---|---|---|---|---|---|
| Cardinals | 0 | 7 | 7 | 6 | **20** |
| Oilers | 7 | 17 | 7 | 7 | **38** |

at Astrodome • Houston, Texas

- Date: November 20, 1988
- Game time: 12 Noon CST
- Game attendance: 43,843
- Referee: Johnny Grier
- TV announcers (CBS): Verne Lundquist (play-by-play) and Terry Bradshaw (color commentator) (blacked out locally)
- Pro-Football-Reference.com

Game information

Cardinals

Oilers

Scoring summary

| Quarter | Time | Drive | | | Team | Scoring information | Score | |
| Quarter | Time | Plays | Yards | TOP | Team | Scoring information | PHO | HOU |
|---|---|---|---|---|---|---|---|---|
| "TOP" = time of possession. For other American football terms, see Glossary of American football. | | | | | | | 20 | 38 |

==== Week 13 ====
Week 13: Houston Oilers at Dallas Cowboys

| Quarter | 1 | 2 | 3 | 4 | Total |
|---|---|---|---|---|---|
| Oilers | 0 | 10 | 3 | 12 | **25** |
| Cowboys | 7 | 3 | 7 | 0 | **17** |

at Texas Stadium • Irving, Texas

- Date: November 24, 1988
- Game time: 3:00 p.m. CST
- Game attendance: 50,845
- Referee: Gene Barth
- TV announcers (NBC): Dick Enberg (play-by-play) and Merlin Olsen (color commentator)
- Pro-Football-Reference.com

Game information

Oilers

Cowboys

Scoring summary

| Quarter | Time | Drive | | | Team | Scoring information | Score | |
| Quarter | Time | Plays | Yards | TOP | Team | Scoring information | HOU | DAL |
|---|---|---|---|---|---|---|---|---|
| "TOP" = time of possession. For other American football terms, see Glossary of American football. | | | | | | | 25 | 17 |

This would be Houston's last win on the road against the Cowboys until 2024.

==== Week 14 ====
Week 14: Pittsburgh Steelers at Houston Oilers

| Quarter | 1 | 2 | 3 | 4 | Total |
|---|---|---|---|---|---|
| Steelers | 3 | 14 | 7 | 13 | **37** |
| Oilers | 0 | 13 | 14 | 7 | **34** |

at Astrodome • Houston, Texas

- Date: December 4, 1988
- Game time: 7:00 p.m. CST
- Game attendance: 47,791
- Referee: Bob McElwee
- TV announcers (ESPN): Mike Patrick (play-by-play) and Joe Theismann (color commentator)
- Pro-Football-Reference.com

Game information

Steelers

Oilers

Scoring summary

| Quarter | Time | Drive | | | Team | Scoring information | Score | |
| Quarter | Time | Plays | Yards | TOP | Team | Scoring information | PIT | HOU |
|---|---|---|---|---|---|---|---|---|
| "TOP" = time of possession. For other American football terms, see Glossary of American football. | | | | | | | 37 | 34 |

==== Week 15 ====
Week 15: Cincinnati Bengals at Houston Oilers

| Quarter | 1 | 2 | 3 | 4 | Total |
|---|---|---|---|---|---|
| Bengals | 0 | 3 | 3 | 0 | **6** |
| Oilers | 7 | 17 | 7 | 10 | **41** |

at Astrodome • Houston, Texas

- Date: December 11, 1988
- Game time: 12 Noon CST
- Game attendance: 50,269
- Referee: Tom Dooley
- TV announcers (NBC): Charlie Jones (play-by-play) and Jimmy Cefalo (color commentator)
- Pro-Football-Reference.com

Game information

Bengals

Oilers

Scoring summary

| Quarter | Time | Drive | | | Team | Scoring information | Score | |
| Quarter | Time | Plays | Yards | TOP | Team | Scoring information | CIN | HOU |
|---|---|---|---|---|---|---|---|---|
| "TOP" = time of possession. For other American football terms, see Glossary of American football. | | | | | | | 6 | 41 |

==== Week 16 ====
Week 16: Houston Oilers at Cleveland Browns

| Quarter | 1 | 2 | 3 | 4 | Total |
|---|---|---|---|---|---|
| Oilers | 10 | 6 | 7 | 0 | **23** |
| Browns | 0 | 7 | 7 | 14 | **28** |

at Cleveland Stadium • Cleveland, Ohio

- Date: December 18, 1988
- Game time: 12 Noon CST
- Game attendance: 74,610
- Referee: Dick Jorgensen
- TV announcers (NBC): Don Criqui (play-by-play) and Bob Trumpy (color commentator)
- Pro-Football-Reference.com

Game information

Oilers

Browns

Scoring summary

| Quarter | Time | Drive | | | Team | Scoring information | Score | |
| Quarter | Time | Plays | Yards | TOP | Team | Scoring information | HOU | CLE |
|---|---|---|---|---|---|---|---|---|
| "TOP" = time of possession. For other American football terms, see Glossary of American football. | | | | | | | 23 | 28 |

=== Standings ===
AFC Central
| | W | L | T | PCT | DIV | CONF | PF | PA | STK |
|---|---|---|---|---|---|---|---|---|---|
| ^{(1)} Cincinnati Bengals | 12 | 4 | 0 | .750 | 4–2 | 8–4 | 448 | 329 | W1 |
| ^{(4)} Cleveland Browns | 10 | 6 | 0 | .625 | 4–2 | 6–6 | 304 | 288 | W1 |
| ^{(5)} Houston Oilers | 10 | 6 | 0 | .625 | 3–3 | 7–5 | 424 | 365 | L1 |
| Pittsburgh Steelers | 5 | 11 | 0 | .313 | 1–5 | 4–8 | 336 | 421 | W1 |

== Playoffs ==
| Round | Date | Opponent (seed) | Result | Record | Venue | Attendance |
|---|---|---|---|---|---|---|
| Wild Card | December 24 | at Cleveland Browns (4) | W 24–23 | 1–0 | Cleveland Municipal Stadium | 74,977 |
| Divisional | January 1, 1989 | at Buffalo Bills (2) | L 10–17 | 1–1 | Rich Stadium | 79,532 |

=== AFC Wild Card ===
AFC Wild Card Playoff: Houston Oilers at Cleveland Browns

| Quarter | 1 | 2 | 3 | 4 | Total |
|---|---|---|---|---|---|
| Oilers | 0 | 14 | 0 | 10 | 24 |
| Browns | 3 | 6 | 7 | 7 | 23 |

at Cleveland Stadium • Cleveland, Ohio

- Date: December 24, 1988
- Game time: 12:30 p.m. CST
- Game attendance: 74,977
- Referee: Jerry Seeman
- TV announcers (NBC): Don Criqui (play-by-play) and Bob Trumpy (color commentator)
- Pro-Football-Reference.com

Game information

Oilers

Browns

Scoring summary

| Quarter | Time | Drive | | | Team | Scoring information | Score | |
| Quarter | Time | Plays | Yards | TOP | Team | Scoring information | HOU | CLE |
|---|---|---|---|---|---|---|---|---|
| "TOP" = time of possession. For other American football terms, see Glossary of American football. | | | | | | | 24 | 23 |

This was the last time an NFL team from Houston won a playoff game on the road. The Oilers would lose their next four road playoff games in Houston, and the Houston Texans are 0-6 in road playoff games as of 2024.

=== AFC Divisional ===
AFC Divisional Playoff: Houston Oilers at Buffalo Bills

| Quarter | 1 | 2 | 3 | 4 | Total |
|---|---|---|---|---|---|
| Oilers | 0 | 3 | 0 | 7 | 10 |
| Bills | 0 | 7 | 7 | 3 | 17 |

at Rich Stadium • Orchard Park, New York

- Date: January 1, 1989
- Game time: 11:30 a.m. CST
- Game attendance: 79,532
- Referee: Gordon McCarter
- TV announcers (NBC): Marv Albert (play-by-play) and Paul Maguire (color commentator)
- Pro-Football-Reference.com

Game information

Oilers

Bills

Scoring summary

| Quarter | Time | Drive | | | Team | Scoring information | Score | |
| Quarter | Time | Plays | Yards | TOP | Team | Scoring information | HOU | BUF |
|---|---|---|---|---|---|---|---|---|
| "TOP" = time of possession. For other American football terms, see Glossary of American football. | | | | | | | 10 | 17 |

== Awards and records ==
- Warren Moon, Pro Bowl
- Warren Moon, All-Pro selection

=== Milestones ===
- Drew Hill, 3rd 1,000 Yard Receiving Season (1,141)
