= List of Tennessee Titans seasons =

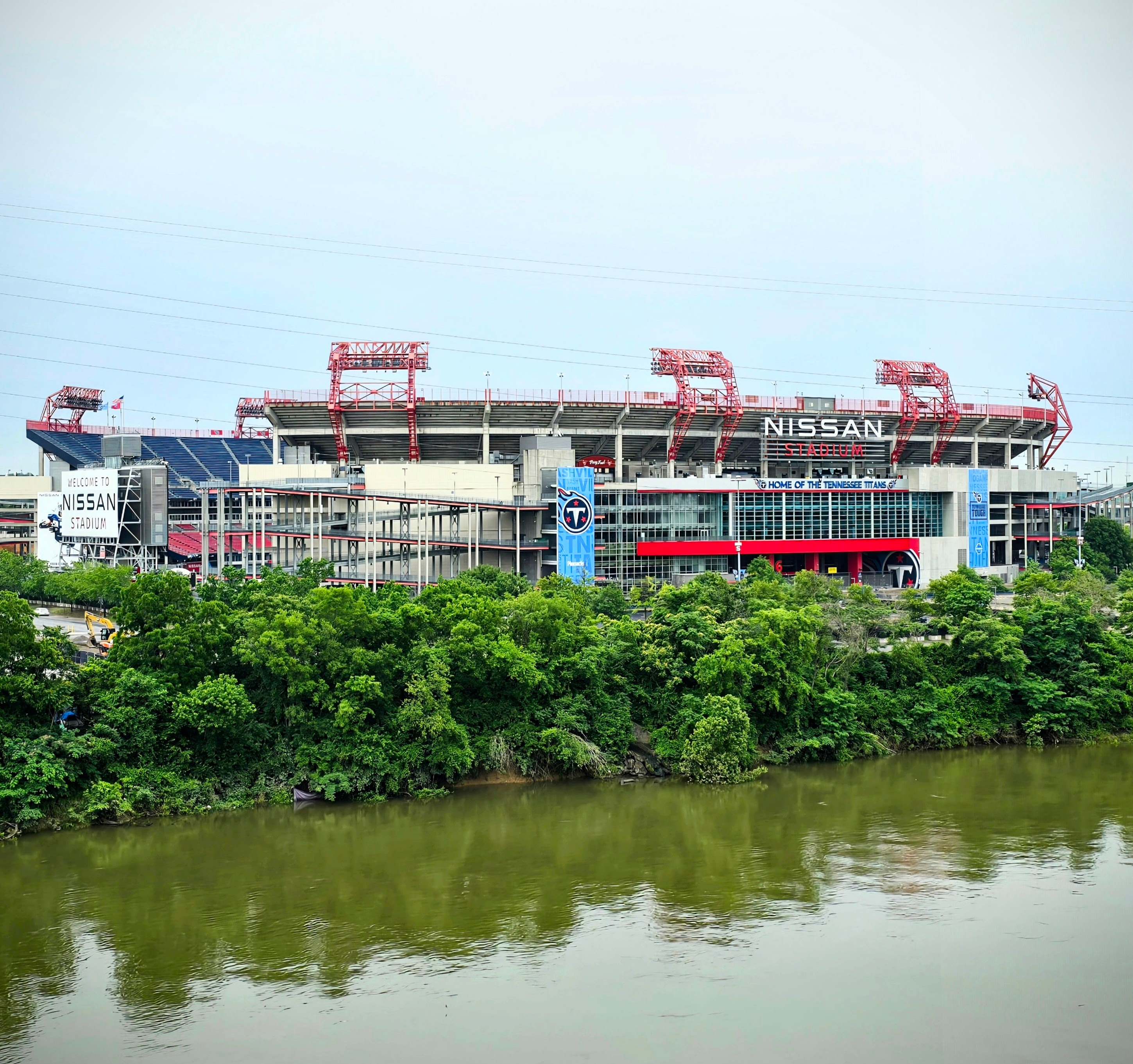
The Tennessee Titans have played their home games at the Nissan Stadium since 1999.

The Tennessee Titans are a professional American football team based in Nashville, Tennessee. They compete in the AFC South division of the American Football Conference (AFC) in the National Football League (NFL). The team was originally established as the Houston Oilers in 1959 by businessman Bud Adams, and began play in 1960 as a charter member of the American Football League (AFL). The Oilers were successful in the early years of the AFL, winning the league's first two championships in 1960 and 1961.

Following the AFL–NFL merger in 1970, the Oilers became part of the NFL's AFC Central division. In 1997, Adams relocated the franchise from Houston to Tennessee, where it played its inaugural season as the Tennessee Oilers at the Liberty Bowl Memorial Stadium in Memphis. The team relocated to Vanderbilt Stadium in Nashville in 1998. The following year, it was rebranded as the Tennessee Titans to coincide with the opening of its new current home stadium, originally named Adelphia Coliseum, now known as Nissan Stadium. The Titans made an immediate impact under their new identity, reaching Super Bowl XXXIV in their first season with the new name, narrowly losing to the St. Louis Rams.

The Titans were placed in the AFC South division following the 2002 NFL realignment. Since 2002, they have made the AFC Championship twice, in the 2002 and 2019 seasons, losing both times. Throughout their history, including their time as the Oilers, the franchise has experienced periods of both success and struggle. Over 65 combined seasons in the AFL and NFL, the team has posted an overall record of 479 wins, 515 losses, and 6 ties. They have qualified for the playoffs 25 times, winning two AFL Championships (1960 and 1961), one AFC Championship (1999), and eleven division titles.

== Seasons ==
Key
AFL Champions (1960–1969)^{§}	Super Bowl champions (1966–present)^{†}	Conference champions^{*}	Division champions^{^}	Wild card berth^{#}

Season	Team	League	Conference	Division	Regular season				Postseason results	Awards	Head coaches	Refs
Season	Team	League	Conference	Division	Finish	W	L	T	Postseason results	Awards	Head coaches	Refs
Houston Oilers
1960	1960	AFL^{§}	—	East^{^}	1st^{^}	10	4	0	Won AFL Championship (1) (Chargers) 24–16		Lou Rymkus	
1961	1961	AFL^{§}	—	East^{^}	1st^{^}	10	3	1	Won AFL Championship (2) (at Chargers) 10–3	George Blanda (MVP)	Lou Rymkus (1–3–1) Wally Lemm (9–0)	
1962	1962	AFL	—	East^	1st^{^}	11	3	0	Lost AFL Championship (Dallas Texans) 17–20 (2 OT)		Pop Ivy	
1963	1963	AFL	—	East	3rd	6	8	0			Pop Ivy	
1964	1964	AFL	—	East	4th	4	10	0			Sammy Baugh	
1965	1965	AFL	—	East	4th	4	10	0			Hugh Taylor	
1966	1966	AFL	—	East	4th	3	11	0			Wally Lemm	
1967	1967	AFL	—	East	1st^{^}	9	4	1	Lost AFL Championship (at Raiders) 7–40		Wally Lemm	
1968	1968	AFL	—	East	2nd	7	7	0			Wally Lemm	
1969	1969	AFL	—	East	2nd^{#}	6	6	2	Lost Divisional playoffs (at Raiders) 7–56		Wally Lemm	
1970	1970	NFL	AFC	Central	4th	3	10	1			Wally Lemm	
1971	1971	NFL	AFC	Central	3rd	4	9	1			Ed Hughes	
1972	1972	NFL	AFC	Central	4th	1	13	0			Bill Peterson	
1973	1973	NFL	AFC	Central	4th	1	13	0			Bill Peterson (0–5) Sid Gillman (1–8)	
1974	1974	NFL	AFC	Central	2nd	7	7	0			Sid Gillman	
1975	1975	NFL	AFC	Central	3rd	10	4	0		Robert Brazile (DROY)	Bum Phillips	
1976	1976	NFL	AFC	Central	4th	5	9	0			Bum Phillips	
1977	1977	NFL	AFC	Central	3rd	8	6	0			Bum Phillips	
1978 (Note: In 1978, the NFL expanded its regular season schedule, which had been 14 games since 1961, to 16 games.)	1978	NFL	AFC	Central	2nd^{#}	10	6	0	Won Wild Card playoffs (at Dolphins) 17–9; Won Divisional playoffs (at Patriots) 31–14; Lost AFC Championship (at Steelers) 5–34	Earl Campbell (OPOY, OROY)	Bum Phillips	
1979	1979	NFL	AFC	Central	2nd^{#}	11	5	0	Won Wild Card playoffs (Broncos) 13–7; Won Divisional playoffs (at Chargers) 17–14; Lost AFC Championship (at Steelers) 13–27	Earl Campbell (MVP, OPOY)	Bum Phillips	
1980	1980	NFL	AFC	Central	2nd^{#}	11	5	0	Lost Wild Card playoffs (at Raiders) 7–27	Earl Campbell (OPOY)	Bum Phillips	
1981	1981	NFL	AFC	Central	3rd	7	9	0			Ed Biles	
1982	1982	NFL	AFC	— (Note: The 1982 season was shortened to nine games after a players' strike. The top eight teams in each conference advanced to the playoffs.)	13th	1	8	0			Ed Biles	
1983	1983	NFL	AFC	Central	4th	2	14	0			Ed Biles (0–6) Chuck Studley (2–8)	
1984	1984	NFL	AFC	Central	4th	3	13	0			Hugh Campbell	
1985	1985	NFL	AFC	Central	4th	5	11	0			Hugh Campbell (5–9) Jerry Glanville (0–2)	
1986	1986	NFL	AFC	Central	4th	5	11	0			Jerry Glanville	
1987 (Note: The 1987 NFL strike caused the schedule to be reduced to 15 games.)	1987	NFL	AFC	Central	2nd^{#}	9	6	0	Won Wild Card playoffs (Seahawks) 23–20 (OT); Lost Divisional playoffs (at Broncos) 10–34		Jerry Glanville	
1988	1988	NFL	AFC	Central	3rd^{#}	10	6	0	Won Wild Card playoffs (at Browns) 24–23; Lost Divisional playoffs (at Bills) 10–17		Jerry Glanville	
1989	1989	NFL	AFC	Central	2nd^{#}	9	7	0	Lost Wild Card playoffs (Steelers) 23–26 (OT)	Warren Moon (WPMOY)	Jerry Glanville	
1990	1990	NFL	AFC	Central	2nd^{#}	9	7	0	Lost Wild Card playoffs (at Bengals) 14–41	Warren Moon (OPOY)	Jack Pardee	
1991	1991	NFL	AFC	Central^{^}	1st^{^}	11	5	0	Won Wild Card playoffs (Jets) 17–10; Lost Divisional playoffs (at Broncos) 24–26		Jack Pardee	
1992	1992	NFL	AFC	Central	2nd^{#}	10	6	0	Lost Wild Card playoffs (at Bills) 38–41 (OT)		Jack Pardee	
1993	1993	NFL	AFC	Central^{^}	1st^{^}	12	4	0	Lost Divisional playoffs (Chiefs) 20–28		Jack Pardee	
1994	1994	NFL	AFC	Central	4th	2	14	0			Jack Pardee (1–9) Jeff Fisher (1–5)	
1995	1995	NFL	AFC	Central	2nd	7	9	0			Jeff Fisher	
1996	1996	NFL	AFC	Central	4th	8	8	0		Eddie George (OROY)	Jeff Fisher	
Tennessee Oilers
1997	1997	NFL	AFC	Central	3rd	8	8	0			Jeff Fisher	
1998	1998	NFL	AFC	Central	2nd	8	8	0			Jeff Fisher	
Tennessee Titans
1999	1999	NFL	AFC^{*}	Central	2nd^{#}	13	3	0	Won Wild Card playoffs (Bills) 22–16; Won Divisional playoffs (at Colts) 19–16; Won AFC Championship (at Jaguars) 33–14; Lost Super Bowl XXXIV (vs. Rams) 16–23	Jevon Kearse (DROY)	Jeff Fisher	
2000	2000	NFL	AFC	Central^{^}	1st^{^}	13	3	0	Lost Divisional playoffs (Ravens) 10–24		Jeff Fisher	
2001	2001	NFL	AFC	Central	4th	7	9	0			Jeff Fisher	
2002	2002	NFL	AFC	South^{^ (Note: Following the 2002 NFL realignment, the Titans played in the AFC South division.)}	1st^{^}	11	5	0	Won Divisional playoffs (Steelers) 34–31 (OT); Lost AFC Championship (at Raiders) 24–41		Jeff Fisher	
2003	2003	NFL	AFC	South	2nd^{#}	12	4	0	Won Wild Card playoffs (at Ravens) 20–17; Lost Divisional playoffs (at Patriots) 14–17	Steve McNair (Co-MVP (Note: In 2003, Steve McNair and Peyton Manning each received 16 MVP votes and were declared Co-MVPs for the season.))	Jeff Fisher	
2004	2004	NFL	AFC	South	4th	5	11	0			Jeff Fisher	
2005	2005	NFL	AFC	South	3rd	4	12	0			Jeff Fisher	
2006	2006	NFL	AFC	South	2nd	8	8	0		Vince Young (OROY)	Jeff Fisher	
2007	2007	NFL	AFC	South	3rd^{#}	10	6	0	Lost Wild Card playoffs (at Chargers) 6–17		Jeff Fisher	
2008	2008	NFL	AFC	South^{^}	1st^{^}	13	3	0	Lost Divisional playoffs (Ravens) 10–13		Jeff Fisher	
2009	2009	NFL	AFC	South	3rd	8	8	0		Chris Johnson (OPOY)	Jeff Fisher	
2010	2010	NFL	AFC	South	4th	6	10	0			Jeff Fisher	
2011	2011	NFL	AFC	South	2nd	9	7	0			Mike Munchak	
2012	2012	NFL	AFC	South	3rd	6	10	0			Mike Munchak	
2013	2013	NFL	AFC	South	2nd	7	9	0			Mike Munchak	
2014	2014	NFL	AFC	South	4th	2	14	0			Ken Whisenhunt	
2015	2015	NFL	AFC	South	4th	3	13	0			Ken Whisenhunt (1–6) Mike Mularkey (2–7)	
2016	2016	NFL	AFC	South	2nd	9	7	0			Mike Mularkey	
2017	2017	NFL	AFC	South	2nd^{#}	9	7	0	Won Wild Card playoffs (at Chiefs) 22–21; Lost Divisional playoffs (at Patriots) 14–35		Mike Mularkey	
2018	2018	NFL	AFC	South	3rd	9	7	0			Mike Vrabel	
2019	2019	NFL	AFC	South	2nd^{#}	9	7	0	Won Wild Card playoffs (at Patriots) 20–13; Won Divisional playoffs (at Ravens) 28–12; Lost AFC Championship (at Chiefs) 24–35	Ryan Tannehill (CPOY)	Mike Vrabel	
2020	2020	NFL	AFC	South^{^}	1st^{^}	11	5	0	Lost Wild Card playoffs (Ravens) 13–20	Derrick Henry (OPOY)	Mike Vrabel	
2021 (Note: In 2021, the NFL expanded its regular season schedule, which had been 16 games since 1978, to 17 games.)	2021	NFL	AFC	South^{^}	1st^{^}	12	5	0	Lost Divisional playoffs (Bengals) 16–19	Mike Vrabel (COY)	Mike Vrabel	
2022	2022	NFL	AFC	South	2nd	7	10	0			Mike Vrabel	
2023	2023	NFL	AFC	South	4th	6	11	0			Mike Vrabel	
2024	2024	NFL	AFC	South	4th	3	14	0			Brian Callahan	
2025	2025	NFL	AFC	South	4th	3	14	0			Brian Callahan (1–5) Mike McCoy (2–9)	

=== All-time records ===
All-time records
Statistic	Wins	Losses	Ties	Win%
Houston Oilers regular season record (1960–1996)	251	291	6	.464
Tennessee Oilers regular season record (1997–1998)	16	16	0	.500
Tennessee Titans regular season record (1999–2025)	215	226	0	.488
All-time regular season record (1960–2025)	482	529	6	.477
Houston Oilers post-season record (1960–1996)	9	13	—	.409
Tennessee Oilers post-season record (1997–1998)	0	0	—	.000
Tennessee Titans post-season record (1999–2025)	8	10	—	.444
All-time post-season record (1960–2025)	17	23	—	.425
All-time regular and post-season record (1960–2025)	499	552	6	.475

== See also ==
- History of the Tennessee Titans
- History of the Houston Oilers
