= List of Chico State Wildcats in the NFL draft =

This is a list of Chico State Wildcats football players in the NFL draft.

== Key ==
B	Back	K	Kicker	NT	Nose tackle
C	Center	LB	Linebacker	FB	Fullback
DB	Defensive back	P	Punter	HB	Halfback
DE	Defensive end	QB	Quarterback	WR	Wide receiver
DT	Defensive tackle	RB	Running back	G	Guard
E	End	T	Offensive tackle	TE	Tight end

== Selections ==
Year	Round	Pick	Overall	Player	Team	Position
1955	21	9	250	George Maderos	San Francisco 49ers	DB
1966	20	8	298	Gerald Circo	Philadelphia Eagles	K
1972	15	18	382	Jewell McCullar	Cleveland Browns	LB
1976	8	8	217	Rich Sorenson	Detroit Lions	K
1988	5	21	130	Chris Verhulst	Houston Oilers	TE
