= Steve Brown (American football) =

American football player and coach (born 1960)

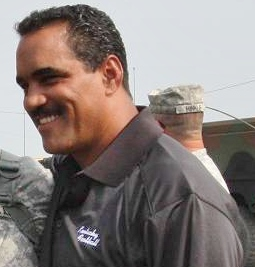
- Brown visits the Kentucky Army National Guard in 2010.

No. 24
- Position: Cornerback

Personal information
- Born: March 20, 1960 (age 66); Sacramento, California, U.S.
- Listed height: 5 ft 11 in (1.80 m)
- Listed weight: 189 lb (86 kg)

Career information
- High school: McClatchy (Sacramento)
- College: Oregon
- NFL draft: 1983: 3rd round, 83rd overall pick

Career history

Playing
- Houston Oilers (1983–1990); San Francisco 49ers (1991)*
- * Offseason or practice squad member only

Coaching
- St. Louis Rams (1995) Defensive assistant; St. Louis Rams (1996–1997) Cornerback coach; St. Louis Rams (1998–2000) Secondary coach; Kentucky (2003–2006) Defensive backs coach; Kentucky (2007–2010) Defensive coordinator; Kentucky (2011) Co-Defensive coordinator & Defensive backs coach; Tennessee Titans (2012–2015) Assistant secondary coach; East Tennessee State (2018–2022) Secondary coach; Michigan Panthers (2023) Defensive coordinator & Defensive backs coach

Awards and highlights
- As coach: Super Bowl champion (XXXIV); Liberty Bowl champion (2008); 2× Music City Bowl champion (2006–2007); As player: First-team All-Pac-10 (1982); Second-team All-Pac-10 (1981)

Career NFL statistics
- Interceptions: 18
- Fumble recoveries: 3
- Sacks: 5
- Stats at Pro Football Reference

Steven Douglas Brown (born March 20, 1960) is an American former football player and coach. He played his entire professional career with the Houston Oilers of the National Football League (NFL) from 1983 to 1990.

Brown played college football for the Oregon Ducks. He became a coach after his playing career, serving as the defensive coordinator and defensive backs coach for the Michigan Panthers of the United Football League (UFL).

== Early life ==
Born and raised in Sacramento, California, Brown graduated from C. K. McClatchy High School in 1978.

== College career ==
Brown played defensive back and kick returner for four seasons on the University of Oregon Ducks football team from 1979 to 1982 under coach Rich Brooks. Brown graduated in 1983 with a degree in English literature and was a member of Kappa Alpha Psi. Brown returned 78 kickoffs for 1,868 yards and a touchdown and 18 punts for 185 yards and a touchdown. He also had 8 interceptions returned for 139 yards and a touchdown.

== Professional playing career ==
From 1983 to 1990, Brown played at left cornerback for the Houston Oilers. He had 18 interceptions returned for 264 yards and a touchdown and also had 5 sacks. Brown was also a kick returner from 1983 to 1985, with 36 returns for 857 yards and a touchdown.

== NFL career statistics ==
| Year | Team | Games | | Interceptions | | | | | Fumbles | | | | | Kick returns | | | |
| Year | Team | GP | GS | Int | Yds | Lng | TD | PD | FF | Fum | FR | Yds | TD | Ret | Yds | Lng | TD |
|---|---|---|---|---|---|---|---|---|---|---|---|---|---|---|---|---|---|
| 1983 | HOU | 16 | 10 | 1 | 16 | 16 | 0 | — | — | 2 | 0 | 0 | 0 | 31 | 795 | 93 | 1 |
| 1984 | HOU | 16 | 16 | 1 | 26 | 26 | 0 | — | — | 1 | 1 | 0 | 0 | 3 | 17 | 17 | 0 |
| 1985 | HOU | 15 | 14 | 5 | 41 | 22 | 0 | — | — | 1 | 1 | 0 | 0 | 2 | 45 | 26 | 0 |
| 1986 | HOU | 16 | 16 | 2 | 34 | 38 | 0 | — | — | — | — | — | — | — | — | — | — |
| 1987 | HOU | 10 | 10 | 2 | 45 | 35 | 0 | — | — | 1 | 1 | 0 | 0 | — | — | — | — |
| 1988 | HOU | 14 | 14 | 2 | 48 | 44 | 1 | — | — | — | — | — | — | — | — | — | — |
| 1988 | HOU | 16 | 16 | 5 | 54 | 41 | 0 | — | — | — | — | — | — | — | — | — | — |
| 1990 | HOU | 16 | 0 | — | — | — | — | — | — | — | — | — | — | — | — | — | — |
| Career | | 119 | 96 | 18 | 264 | 44 | 1 | 0 | 0 | 5 | 3 | 0 | 0 | 36 | 857 | 93 | 1 |

== Coaching career ==
=== St. Louis Rams ===
In 1995, Brown reunited with Rich Brooks, his former coach at Oregon, to become a defensive assistant coach for the St. Louis Rams under Brooks. Brown moved to coaching cornerbacks in 1996 and remained cornerbacks coach in 1997 under new coach Dick Vermeil. From 1998 to 2000, including the 1999 Super Bowl XXXIV championship season, Brown coached the defensive backs at St. Louis. Brown coached under Mike Martz in the 2000 season. Among Rams players coached by Brown include Dre' Bly, Kevin Carter, London Fletcher, and Todd Lyght.

=== Kentucky ===
In 2003, Brown joined Rich Brooks's staff at the University of Kentucky as defensive backs coach. Brown remained in that position until 2006 and was promoted to defensive coordinator in 2007. Brown remained defensive coordinator in Joker Phillips's inaugural 2010 staff and became co-defensive coordinator and defensive backs coach in 2011. Brown coached in Kentucky teams with three straight bowl wins (2006 Music City Bowl, 2007 Music City Bowl, and 2009 Liberty Bowl) as well as two runner-up bowl appearances (2009 Music City Bowl, 2011 BBVA Compass Bowl).

=== Tennessee Titans ===
In 2012, Brown joined Mike Munchak's staff at the Tennessee Titans as assistant secondary coach; he remained at this position under new coach Ken Whisenhunt in 2014. After the 2015 season, Brown left the Tennessee Titans.

=== East Tennessee State ===
He returned to coaching in 2018, accepting the position of defensive backs coach at ETSU.

=== Michigan Panthers ===
On February 7, 2023, Brown was hired as the defensive coordinator and defensive backs coach for the Michigan Panthers of the United States Football League (USFL). On January 29, 2024, it was revealed that Collin Bauer became the new defensive coordinator.

== Personal life ==
Brown is the younger brother of actress Olivia Brown, who co-starred in the 1980s hit show Miami Vice.
