= Allen Pinkett =

American football player (born 1964)

No. 20
- Position: Running back

Personal information
- Born: January 25, 1964 (age 62); Washington, D.C., U.S.
- Listed height: 5 ft 9 in (1.75 m)
- Listed weight: 192 lb (87 kg)

Career information
- High school: Park View (Loudoun County, Virginia)
- College: Notre Dame
- NFL draft: 1986: 3rd round, 61st overall pick

Career history
- Houston Oilers (1986–1991); New Orleans Saints (1992)*; Green Bay Packers (1993)*
- * Offseason or practice squad member only

Awards and highlights
- First-team All-American (1983)

Career NFL statistics
- Rushing yards: 2,324
- Rushing average: 4.1
- Rushing touchdowns: 21
- Stats at Pro Football Reference

Allen Jerome Pinkett (born January 25, 1964) is an American former professional football player who was a running back for six seasons with the Houston Oilers of the National Football League (NFL). He played college football for the Notre Dame Fighting Irish.

Pinkett was born in Washington, D.C.; he grew up in the Sterling, Virginia, area and attended Park View High School from 1978 to 1982.

== College playing career ==
Pinkett played in the Gerry Faust era at Notre Dame, and, as a sophomore, was named a first-team All-American by both Football News and The Sporting News. In 1985, he was eighth in the Heisman balloting. He was Notre Dame's career rushing leader with 4,131 yards until Autry Denson broke his record in 1998, with 4,318 yards. Pinkett was the first Notre Dame player ever to rush for 1,000 yards in three consecutive seasons. He had 1,179 in 1983, 1,268 in 1984 and 1,176 in 1985. He remains the Irish career scoring leader with 53 touchdowns, including 49 rushing. He is tied with Vagas Ferguson (1976–1979) for the most rushing touchdowns in a single season. Pinkett had 17 touchdowns in 1984 and Ferguson had 17 in 1979. Pinkett scored 4 touchdowns against Penn State at Happy Valley on November 12, 1983, and scored 3 against the Nittany Lions at Notre Dame Stadium on November 17, 1984.

== College career statistics ==
Legend
**Bold**	Career high

Year	Team	Games	Rushing				Receiving			
Year	Team	GP	Att	Yds	Avg	TD	Rec	Yds	Avg	TD
1982	Notre Dame	10	107	532	5.0	5	9	94	10.4	0
1983	Notre Dame	**11**	252	**1,394**	**5.5**	16	**28**	**288**	10.3	**2**
1984	Notre Dame	**11**	**275**	1,105	4.0	**17**	19	257	**13.5**	1
1985	Notre Dame	**11**	255	1,100	4.3	11	17	135	7.9	0
		43	889	4,131	4.6	49	73	774	10.6	3

== Professional playing career ==
Pinkett was drafted in the third round of the 1986 NFL Draft by the Houston Oilers. He played six seasons for the Oilers, from 1986 to 1991. In his career with the Oilers, he gained 2,624 yards rushing with 21 touchdowns, and caught 119 passes and 5 touchdowns. He was the team's leading rusher in his final year, 1991, with 720 yards.

== NFL career statistics ==
Legend
**Bold**	Career high

=== Regular season ===
Year	Team	Games		Rushing					Receiving				
Year	Team	GP	GS	Att	Yds	Avg	Lng	TD	Rec	Yds	Avg	Lng	TD
1986	HOU	**16**	3	77	225	2.9	14	2	**35**	**248**	7.1	20	1
1987	HOU	8	0	31	149	**4.8**	22	2	1	7	7.0	7	0
1988	HOU	**16**	2	122	513	4.2	27	7	12	114	**9.5**	**51**	**2**
1989	HOU	**16**	6	94	449	**4.8**	**60**	1	31	239	7.7	23	1
1990	HOU	15	0	66	268	4.1	19	0	11	85	7.7	38	0
1991	HOU	**16**	**16**	**171**	**720**	4.2	32	**9**	29	228	7.9	36	1
Career		87	27	561	2,324	4.1	60	21	119	921	7.7	51	5

=== Playoffs ===
Year	Team	Games		Rushing					Receiving				
Year	Team	GP	GS	Att	Yds	Avg	Lng	TD	Rec	Yds	Avg	Lng	TD
1987	HOU	**2**	0	**17**	49	2.9	8	0	2	8	4.0	5	0
1988	HOU	**2**	**1**	**17**	**95**	5.6	**27**	**1**	**4**	**45**	**11.3**	**15**	**1**
1989	HOU	1	0	8	26	3.3	6	0	3	24	8.0	13	0
1990	HOU	1	0	5	43	**8.6**	16	0	1	10	10.0	10	0
1991	HOU	**2**	**1**	0	0	0.0	0	0	0	0	0.0	0	0
Career		8	2	47	213	4.5	27	1	10	87	8.7	15	1

== Post-playing career ==
Pinkett served as the color commentator for Notre Dame's football games broadcast by IMG College from 2006 to 2017. He was removed from the broadcasting team on August 30, 2012, following inappropriate remarks. In 2010, he split play-by-play partners with Don Criqui, who did home Notre Dame's football games, and Dick Enberg, who did road Notre Dame's football games. He was also a sideline reporter for the NFL on Westwood One and did color analyzing with Jim Henderson on radio broadcasts for the New Orleans Saints.

== Suspension ==
On August 29, 2012, Pinkett appeared on WSCR in Chicago and said that there's nothing wrong with having "a few bad citizens" on Notre Dame's roster, and that a team "full of choirboys" wouldn't win many games. Given a chance to clarify his remarks, Pinkett claimed that winning teams always had "a couple of criminals" on their rosters. Notre Dame's athletic department harshly condemned Pinkett's remarks, and IMG suspended him for three games.
