= Mike Akiu =

American football player and coach (born 1962)

No. 86
- Position: Wide receiver

Personal information
- Born: February 12, 1962 (age 64); Kailua, Hawaii, U.S.
- Listed height: 5 ft 9 in (1.75 m)
- Listed weight: 182 lb (83 kg)

Career information
- High school: Kalaheo (Kailua)
- College: Hawaii
- NFL draft: 1985: 7th round, 170th overall pick

Career history

Playing
- Houston Oilers (1985–1987); San Francisco 49ers (1988)*; Buffalo Bills (1988)*; Houston Oilers (1989)*
- * Offseason or practice squad member only

Coaching
- Kalaheo Mustangs (2000–2002) (HC)

Career NFL statistics
- Receptions: 6
- Receiving yards: 99
- Total touchdowns: 1
- Stats at Pro Football Reference

Karl Michael Akiu (born February 12, 1962) is an American former professional football player who was a wide receiver for two seasons with the Houston Oilers of the National Football League (NFL). He was selected by the Oilers in the seventh round of the 1985 NFL draft. He first enrolled at Washington State University before transferring to play college football for the Hawaii Rainbow Warriors. Akiu attended Kalaheo High School in Kailua, Honolulu County, Hawaii. He was also a member of the San Francisco 49ers and Buffalo Bills.

== Early life ==
Akiu played high school football for the Kalaheo High School Mustangs from 1976 to 1979. He played defensive back, running back, and wide receiver for the Mustangs while earning all-state honors. He was also a centerfielder on the baseball team from 1977 to 1980 and a state champion in track and field.

== College career ==
Akiu attended Washington State University on a track scholarship from 1980 to 1982.

Akiu transferred to play college football for the Hawaii Rainbow Warriors of the University of Hawaii at Manoa from 1982 to 1984.

== Professional career ==
Akiu was selected by the Houston Oilers with the 170th pick in the 1985 NFL draft. He played in twenty games, starting one, for the Oilers from 1985 to 1986. He was released by the Oilers on September 7, 1987.

Akiu signed with the San Francisco 49ers on February 9, 1988. He was released by the 49ers on May 12, 1988.

Akiu signed with the Buffalo Bills on July 1, 1988. He was released by the Bills on August 1, 1988.

Akiu was signed by the Oilers on July 18, 1989. He was released by the Oilers on September 8, 1989.

== Coaching career ==
Akiu coached the Windward Tigers Pop Warner Midgets to a 95–5 record.

Akiu was the head football coach at Kalaheo High School from 2000 to 2002, accumulating an 11–14 record. He resigned in March 2003 due to time constraints in relation to his job as a stevedore.

== Personal life ==
Akiu's son Mike Akiu Jr. also played for the Hawaii Rainbow Warriors. On September 1, 1985, Akiu Sr. helped apprehend a burglar who had broken into a hotel room he shared with teammate Willie Drewrey.
