= Willie Drewrey =

American football player (born 1963)

No. 82, 87, 85
- Positions: Wide receiver, return specialist

Personal information
- Born: April 28, 1963 (age 63); Columbus, New Jersey, U.S.
- Listed height: 5 ft 7 in (1.70 m)
- Listed weight: 184 lb (83 kg)

Career information
- High school: Northern Burlington County Regional (New Jersey)
- College: West Virginia
- NFL draft: 1985: 11th round, 281st overall pick

Career history
- Houston Oilers (1985–1988); Tampa Bay Buccaneers (1989–1992); Houston Oilers (1993)

Awards and highlights
- First-team All-American (1984); Second-team All-East (1984)

Career NFL statistics
- Receptions: 106
- Receiving yards: 1,601
- Touchdowns: 7
- Return yards: 3,694
- Stats at Pro Football Reference

Willie James Drewrey (born April 28, 1963) is an American former professional football player who was a wide receiver for nine seasons with the Houston Oilers and Tampa Bay Buccaneers of the National Football League (NFL). He played college football for the West Virginia Mountaineers and was selected in the 11th round of the 1985 NFL draft by the Oilers with the 281st overall pick.

Drewrey played high school football at Northern Burlington County Regional High School. After graduating high school, Drewrey was an electrifying player for the Mountaineers in the early 80s. He was an ace in the return game and a consistent slot receiver. Drewrey found his niche on special teams at the end of his freshman season. Coach Don Nehlen realized he had to get Willie more touches, giving him increased playing time at wide receiver as his career progressed. Drewrey had a monster senior campaign, ranking 3rd in punt returns, 10th in punt return yardage, and 20th in all-purpose yards. He would be named 1st team All-America that year. In all, Drewrey collected 3,508 career all-purpose yards and 9 touchdowns. He still holds the school record for career punt return yardage 1,191. His special teams capabilities earned him a spot in the NFL for 9 seasons with the Buccaneers (in their creamsicle uniforms) and the Oilers (now the Titans).

== NFL career statistics ==
Legend
**Bold**	Career high

=== Regular season ===
Year	Team	Games		Receiving				
Year	Team	GP	GS	Rec	Yds	Avg	Lng	TD
1985	HOU	14	0	2	28	14.0	19	0
1986	HOU	15	0	18	299	16.6	31	0
1987	HOU	12	0	11	148	13.5	35	0
1988	HOU	14	0	11	172	15.6	55	1
1989	TAM	16	0	14	157	11.2	18	1
1990	TAM	16	1	7	182	**26.0**	**89**	1
1991	TAM	16	0	**26**	**375**	14.4	87	**2**
1992	TAM	9	2	16	237	14.8	32	**2**
1993	HOU	16	0	1	3	3.0	3	0
		128	3	106	1,601	15.1	89	7

=== Playoffs ===
Year	Team	Games		Receiving				
Year	Team	GP	GS	Rec	Yds	Avg	Lng	TD
1987	HOU	2	0	5	79	15.8	29	1
		2	0	5	79	15.8	29	1
