= Willie Joyner =

American football player (born 1962)

No. 34, 38
- Position: Running back

Personal information
- Born: April 2, 1962 (age 64); Brooklyn, New York, U.S.
- Listed height: 5 ft 10 in (1.78 m)
- Listed weight: 200 lb (91 kg)

Career information
- High school: Lafayette (Brooklyn)
- College: Maryland
- NFL draft: 1984: 7th round, 170th overall pick

Career history
- Houston Oilers (1984)

Career NFL statistics
- Rushing yards: 22
- Rushing average: 1.6
- Stats at Pro Football Reference

Willie Joyner (born April 2, 1962) is an American former professional football player who was a running back for one season with the Houston Oilers of the National Football League (NFL). He played college football for the Maryland Terrapins.
