= Larry Moriarty =

American football player (born 1958)

No. 30, 32
- Position: Running back

Personal information
- Born: April 24, 1958 (age 68); Santa Barbara, California, U.S.
- Listed height: 6 ft 1 in (1.85 m)
- Listed weight: 240 lb (109 kg)

Career information
- High school: Dos Pueblos (Goleta, California)
- College: Santa Barbara (1979); Notre Dame (1980–1982)
- NFL draft: 1983: 5th round, 114th overall pick

Career history
- Houston Oilers (1983–1986); Kansas City Chiefs (1986-1988)

Career NFL statistics
- Rushing yards: 1,908
- Rushing average: 3.8
- Rushing touchdowns: 13
- Stats at Pro Football Reference

Larry Moriarty (born April 24, 1958) is an American former professional football player who played running back for six seasons for the Houston Oilers and Kansas City Chiefs. He was selected 114th overall by the Oilers in the fifth round of the 1983 NFL draft. He attended Notre Dame in Indiana.
