= Chris Verhulst =

American football player (born 1966)

No. 88, 86
- Position: Tight end

Personal information
- Born: May 16, 1966 (age 60); Sacramento, California, U.S.
- Listed height: 6 ft 3 in (1.91 m)
- Listed weight: 249 lb (113 kg)

Career information
- High school: California (San Ramon, California)
- College: Chico State
- NFL draft: 1988: 5th round, 130th overall pick

Career history
- Houston Oilers (1988–1989); Denver Broncos (1990); San Diego Chargers (1992)*
- * Offseason or practice squad member only

Career NFL statistics
- Receptions: 7
- Receiving yards: 61
- Stats at Pro Football Reference

Christopher Sean Verhulst (born May 16, 1966) is an American former professional football player who was a tight end in the National Football League (NFL) for the Houston Oilers and Denver Broncos. He played college football for the Chico State Wildcats.

== Career ==
=== Houston Oilers ===
Verhulst was selected by the Houston Oilers in the fifth round, with the 130th overall selection, of the 1988 NFL draft. He made one appearance for Houston during his rookie campaign. In 1989, Verhulst played in all 16 games for the Oilers, including 2 starts, and logged 4 receptions for 48 yards.

=== Denver Broncos ===
Verhulst spent the 1990 season with the Denver Broncos. He played in 11 games (including 1 start) and recorded 3 receptions for 13 scoreless yards. Verhulst was released by the Broncos as part of final roster cuts on August 20, 1991.

=== San Diego Chargers ===
Verhulst joined the San Diego Chargers prior to the 1992 season, but retired from football after suffering a torn Achilles during a preseason contest.

== Personal life ==
Verhulst's daughter, Charlotte, played lacrosse at Stony Brook University.
