= Mike Kelley (offensive lineman) =

American football player (born 1962)

No. 58, 62
- Position: Center

Personal information
- Born: February 27, 1962 (age 64); Westfield, Massachusetts, U.S.
- Listed height: 6 ft 5 in (1.96 m)
- Listed weight: 273 lb (124 kg)

Career information
- High school: Westfield (Westfield, Massachusetts)
- College: Notre Dame
- NFL draft: 1985: 3rd round, 82nd overall pick

Career history
- Houston Oilers (1985–1987); Philadelphia Eagles (1987); Los Angeles Raiders (1989)*; Montreal Machine (1991)
- * Offseason or practice squad member only

Career NFL statistics
- Games played: 17
- Stats at Pro Football Reference

Michael Peter Kelley (born February 27, 1962) is an American former professional football player who was a center for the Houston Oilers of the National Football League (NFL). He played college football at University of Notre Dame.
