= Tom Briehl =

American football player (born 1962)

No. 92
- Position: Linebacker

Personal information
- Born: September 8, 1962 (age 64); Phoenix, Arizona, U.S.
- Listed height: 6 ft 3 in (1.91 m)
- Listed weight: 247 lb (112 kg)

Career information
- High school: Phoenix (AZ) Gerard Catholic
- College: Stanford
- NFL draft: 1985: 4th round, 87th overall pick

Career history
- Houston Oilers (1985, 1987); San Diego Chargers (1988)*
- * Offseason or practice squad member only
- Stats at Pro Football Reference

Tom Briehl (born September 8, 1962) is an American former professional football linebacker. He played for the Houston Oilers in 1985 and 1987. He was selected by the Oilers in the fourth round of the 1985 NFL draft with the 87th overall pick.
