= Mike Johnson (defensive end) =

American football player (born 1962)

No. 97
- Position: Defensive end

Personal information
- Born: April 24, 1962 (age 64); Chicago, Illinois, U.S.
- Listed height: 6 ft 5 in (1.96 m)
- Listed weight: 253 lb (115 kg)

Career information
- High school: South Shore
- College: Illinois
- NFL draft: 1984: 9th round, 228th overall pick

Career history
- Houston Oilers (1984–1985)
- Stats at Pro Football Reference

Michael Johnson (born April 24, 1962) is an American former professional football defensive end who played for the Houston Oilers of the National Football League (NFL). He played college football for the Illinois Fighting Illini and was selected by the Oilers in the ninth round of the 1984 NFL draft.

== Early life ==
Michael Johnson was born on April 24, 1962, in Chicago, Illinois. He played high school football at South Shore High School in Chicago as a two-way lineman.

== College career ==
Johnson played junior college football at Arizona Western College from 1980 to 1981. He transferred to the University of Illinois at Urbana-Champaign, where he was a two-year letterman for the Fighting Illini from 1982 to 1983.

== Professional career ==
Illinois was selected by the Houston Oilers in the ninth round, with the 228th overall pick, of the 1984 NFL draft. He signed with the team on July 7. He played in all 16 games during the 1984 season as a reserve defensive end, recording 0.5 sacks and one fumble recovery. Johnson was placed on injured reserve on August 19, 1985, and missed the entire 1985 season. He was released on August 7, 1986, after the first game of the 1986 preseason.
