= Jerry Glanville =

American football player and coach (born 1941)

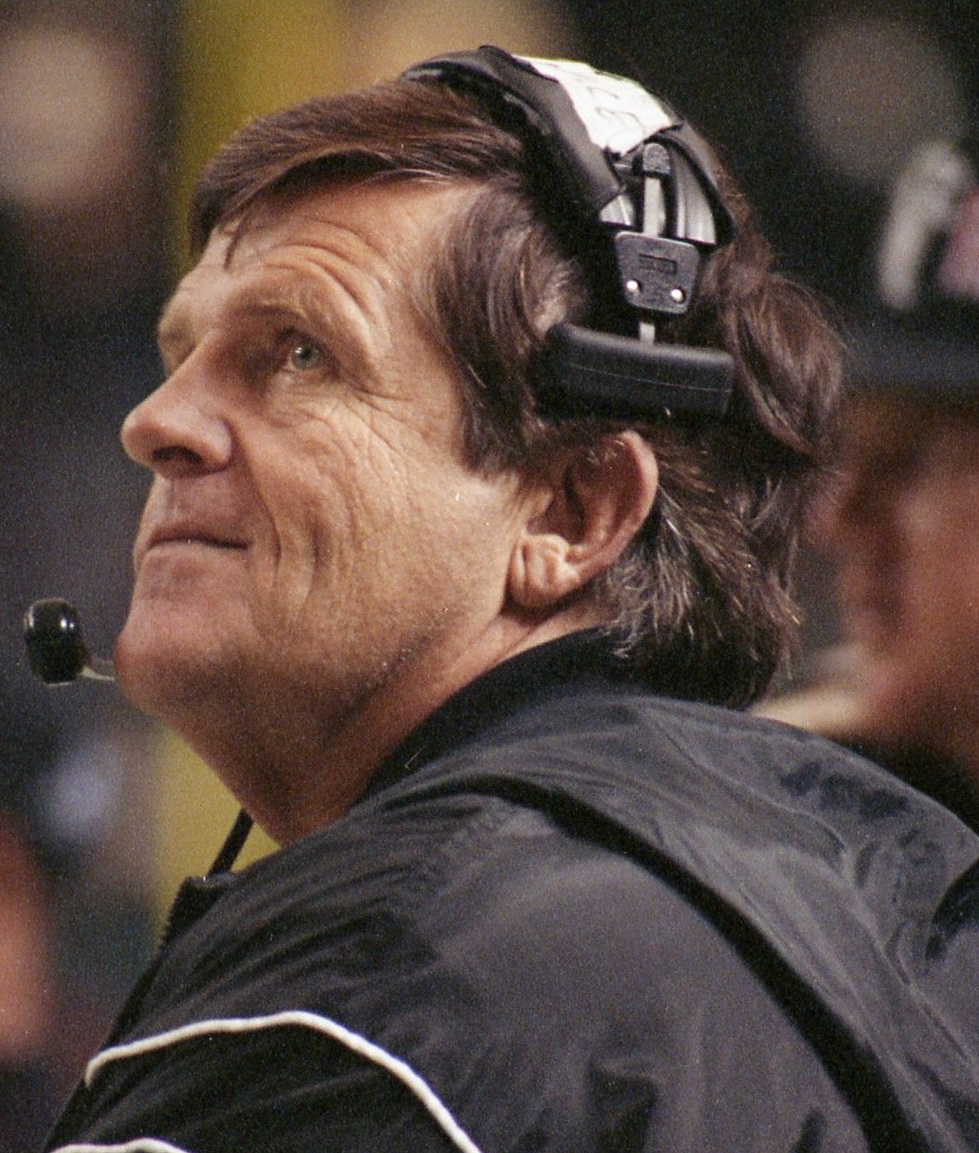
- Glanville in 2009

San Antonio Toros
- Title: Defensive coordinator

Personal information
- Born: October 14, 1941 (age 85); Perrysburg, Ohio, U.S.

Career information
- Position: Linebacker
- High school: Perrysburg
- College: Northern Michigan

Career history
- Western Kentucky (1967) Defensive coordinator; Georgia Tech (1968–1973) Defensive ends & outside linebackers coach; Detroit Lions (1974–1976) Defensive assistant & special teams coordinator; Atlanta Falcons (1977–1978) Defensive backs coach; Atlanta Falcons (1979–1982) Defensive coordinator; Buffalo Bills (1983) Defensive backs coach; Houston Oilers (1984–1985) Defensive coordinator; Houston Oilers (1985–1989) Head coach; Atlanta Falcons (1990–1993) Head coach; Hawaii (2005–2006) Defensive coordinator; Portland State (2007–2009) Head coach; Hamilton Tiger-Cats (2018) Defensive coordinator; Tampa Bay Vipers (2020) Defensive coordinator; TSL Conquerors (2020–2021) Head coach; Alabama Airborne (2022) Head coach; Northwestern Oklahoma State (2024–2025) Defensive coordinator; San Antonio Toros (2026–present) Defensive coordinator

Head coaching record
- Regular season: 60–69 (.465)
- Postseason: 3–4 (.429)
- Career: 63–73 (.463) (NFL); 9–24 (.273) (college)

NASCAR O'Reilly Auto Parts Series career
- 6 races run over 2 years
- Best finish: 65th (1992)
- First race: 1992 Roses Stores 300 (Orange County)
- Last race: 1993 Havoline 250 (Milwaukee)
Wins	Top tens	Poles
0	0	0

NASCAR FedEx Freight Truck Series career
- 27 races run over 5 years
- Best finish: 18th (1995)
- First race: 1995 Skoal Bandit Copper World Classic (Phoenix)
- Last race: 1999 Pennzoil/VIP Discount Auto Center 200 (Loudon)
Wins	Top tens	Poles
0	0	0

ARCA Menards Series career
- 27 races run over 6 years
- Best finish: 31st (2002)
- First race: 1994 Food World 500k (Talladega)
- Last race: 2004 Flagstar 200 (Michigan)
Wins	Top tens	Poles
0	9	0

ARCA Menards Series West career
- 10 races run over 4 years
- Best finish: 33rd (1999)
- First race: 1997 NASCAR 500K (Pikes Peak)
- Last race: 2000 Pontiac Wide-Track Grand Prix 200 (Fontana)
Wins	Top tens	Poles
0	4	0
- Coaching profile at Pro Football Reference

Jerry Michael Glanville (born October 14, 1941) is an American football coach. He is the current defensive coordinator of the San Antonio Toros of the Continental Football League. He played football at Northern Michigan University in the early 1960s, and is a former NASCAR driver and owner, and sportscaster. He served as head coach of the Houston Oilers from 1986 to 1990 and the Atlanta Falcons from 1990 to 1994, compiling a career National Football League (NFL) record of 63–73. From 2007 to 2009, he was the head football coach at Portland State University, tallying a mark of 9–24. Glanville has worked as an analyst on HBO's Inside the NFL, CBS's The NFL Today/NFL on CBS and Fox's coverage of the NFL. He has also raced on the Automobile Racing Club of America circuit. Glanville also briefly served as a consultant and liaison for the United Football League in 2011.

While head coach of the Houston Oilers, Glanville coined the now-famous phrase "NFL means 'not for long'", while admonishing NFL back judge Jim Daopoulos for making what Glanville felt were bad calls. The exact quote is "This isn't college, you're not at a homecoming. This is N-F-L, which stands for 'not for long' when you make them fuckin' calls." The "NFL" line was in reference to the fact that Daopoulos was in his first year in the league, having previously worked in college football.

== Playing career ==
Jerry Glanville grew up in Perrysburg, Ohio and played football for Perrysburg High School, graduating in 1959. He went on to play college football as a middle linebacker at Northern Michigan University, graduating in 1964 with a bachelor's degree. He also holds a master's degree from Western Kentucky University, where he worked as an assistant football coach on campus and roomed with fellow former NFL coach Joe Bugel. The two were known for drawing football plays on pizza boxes.

== Coaching career ==
=== National Football League ===
During Glanville's time in the National Football League he was the special teams/defensive assistant for the Detroit Lions from 1974 to 1976, the secondary coach for the Atlanta Falcons from 1977 to 1978 and the Falcons defensive coordinator from 1979 to 1982, the secondary coach of the Buffalo Bills in 1983, the defensive coordinator of the then Houston Oilers from 1984 to 1985 and then head coach from 1985 to 1989 (initially being the interim coach after the firing of Hugh Campbell, and then being the permanent replacement starting in 1986), and head coach of the Atlanta Falcons from 1990 to 1993.

==== Houston Oilers ====
As head coach of the Oilers from 1985 to 1989, Glanville was famous for often leaving tickets at will-call for Elvis Presley (who by that point had been dead for over a decade), wearing all black to be easily recognized by his players, and driving replicas of vehicles driven by actor James Dean. Glanville's Oilers were an aggressive, hard-hitting team (to the point of resorting to cheap shots in the eyes of their opponents). During his tenure, the Astrodome was nicknamed "The House of Pain" due to both the Oilers' hard-hitting style and the often painfully high decibel levels which were typical of Oilers home games. Glanville often feuded with the head coaches of Houston's AFC Central rivals, Sam Wyche of the Cincinnati Bengals and Marty Schottenheimer of the Cleveland Browns; Glanville was accused of having taught his team "dirty tactics". He received a highly publicized post-game dressing down from Pittsburgh Steelers head coach Chuck Noll during the customary postgame handshake after the Oilers defeated the Steelers in the Houston Astrodome during the 1987 season. On one occasion, when asked who he would least like to have lunch with from a group including Adolf Hitler, Saddam Hussein, and Wyche, Glanville answered "Chuck Noll".

Glanville turned the Oilers, a team that had struggled through most of the 1980s, into an aggressive, hard-hitting group that preached a "hit the beach" mentality, and he made players such as future Hall of Fame quarterback Warren Moon into household names (incidentally, Glanville and Moon didn't get along, as evidenced by Glanville's constant reference to Moon as "our quarterback" in his book Elvis Don't Like Football: The Life and Raucous Times of the NFL's Most Outspoken Coach when discussing his tenure as Oilers' coach.) During Glanville's tenure, the Oilers made three playoff appearances (which happened to be during his last three seasons), twice playing in the AFC divisional round. Despite this, Glanville did not have a great relationship with management, with Glanville once stating that general manager Mike Holovak (then in his seventies) was running the draft while Glanville's job was "to keep him awake".

His final game with the Oilers was the 1989 AFC wild card game, played on December 31, 1989. Glanville's 1989 squad finished its season with consecutive losses against the Bengals in Cincinnati (61–7), at home against the Cleveland Browns in the final seconds in a game that decided the AFC Central title (24–20), and at home in the playoffs against the Steelers (26–23 in overtime). Had the Oilers defeated Pittsburgh, Glanville would have spent January 6, 1990, preparing the team to play at Denver and, possibly, play for its first AFC Championship Game berth in a decade. Instead, Glanville was fired that day. To replace him, Oilers owner K. S. "Bud" Adams hired University of Houston head coach and former Redskins and Bears head coach Jack Pardee.

==== Atlanta Falcons ====
Roughly one week after his firing by the Oilers, Glanville was hired to become the head coach of the Atlanta Falcons (1990–1993). He had been a defensive coordinator for the Falcons, best known for developing the famous "Gritz Blitz" defense that featured rushing multiple players on the defensive side of the football against opposing offenses. The brash Glanville, as well as fan favorites such as cornerback/return specialist Deion Sanders, generated a great deal of excitement in Atlanta. A perfect preseason in 1990 raised expectations prior to the first game of the season, against Glanville's former team, the Oilers. The host Falcons withstood a furious rally and scored on a late pick-six by Sanders. Atlanta defeated the Oilers, 47–27.

Glanville claimed with Atlanta he inherited a "flat-tire," but would take the team to the playoffs in the 1991 season, ending a nine-year playoff drought. Season highlights included a season sweep of the division rival 49ers, which cost San Francisco a playoff spot despite both teams finishing 10–6; and the Falcons' first playoff victory since 1978 and only the second playoff win in the franchise's 26-year history. The season ended with a loss to the eventual Super Bowl champion Washington Redskins in the divisional round. During his time with the Falcons, the team would pitch a "Back in Black" motto with new all-black uniforms and the same aggressive type play on defense, an offensive system known as the "Red Gun" that would implement most of the principles associated with the Run-N-Shoot offense, and an emphasis on special teams as he had done in Houston. The Falcons featured talented players such as future Hall of Fame CB "Prime Time" Deion Sanders and were known for unorthodox antics. Expectations were high after the success of the 1991 season and after the Falcons vacated Atlanta–Fulton County Stadium for the Georgia Dome, but the team's went 6–10 in 1992. The 1993 season saw the team lose their first five games in a row and then close out the season with three straight losses to finish 6–10. On January 4, 1994, with one year remaining on his contract, Glanville was fired. He was out of football until he became the University of Hawaii's defensive coordinator over a decade later. His career record as an NFL head coach is 63–73.

Glanville vehemently opposed Falcons general manager Ken Herock's selection of Brett Favre in the second round of the 1991 NFL draft, citing Favre's personal issues with alcohol and his party lifestyle. He said it would take a plane crash for him to put Favre into a game. Glanville also was known to place $100 bets before games (with Favre and others) on whether Favre could throw a football into the third deck of stadiums or not. Favre only threw four passes during his one season with Atlanta, then was traded to the Green Bay Packers in the 1992 off-season for a first-round draft pick. Glanville claimed the trade was a wake-up call for Favre, who was known for even being late to the team picture during his rookie season with the Falcons. Favre went on to play 19 seasons in the NFL, starting every game from September 20, 1992, to December 5, 2010, and becoming the first NFL player to win three AP MVP awards, as well as the first player to throw for 70,000 passing yards and 500 touchdowns. He would also appear in two Super Bowls, winning Super Bowl XXXI.

=== United Football League ===
On March 21, 2011, the Hartford Colonials of the United Football League announced that Glanville would serve as the team's head coach and general manager. The Colonials suspended operations in August of that year; Glanville would remain with the league as a consultant, color commentator for the league's television broadcasts, and liaison for potential expansion markets. Glanville left the league after one season.

=== College football ===
Glanville was formerly the defensive coordinator for the University of Hawaii's football team, working under his former offensive coordinator (and eventual successor) at Atlanta, June Jones, for two seasons. Prior to his tenure at the University of Hawaii, Glanville's earlier involvement with college football was the defensive ends/outside linebackers coach at Georgia Tech from 1968 to 1973 and the defensive coordinator at Western Kentucky University in 1967, shortly after his own career as a player had ended.

On February 28, 2007, Glanville accepted the head coaching position at Portland State University (PSU), his first college head coaching job. Glanville, who replaced Tim Walsh, was the program's 12th head coach in their history. He resigned this position with the support of the university on November 17, 2009, with an overall record of 9–24 during his tenure.

In 2024, he became defensive coordinator for Northwestern Oklahoma State, an NCAA Division II school.

When asked what he was doing coaching in his eighties, he stated, "Well I tell everyone - preachers preach, and coaches coach. You never really quit coaching. If you can help one player be better than he was yesterday, then you jump out of bed and you run to work. If you can help one guy just improve a little bit, that beats all the money you could ever make. When you crawl into the box, and they put dead men in a box, you only get to take a couple things with you, and it's not money, it's your integrity and who you've helped."

=== Return to coaching ===
On February 23, 2018, Glanville was named defensive coordinator for the Hamilton Tiger-Cats of the Canadian Football League (CFL). He left the team after the 2018 season for personal reasons.

In 2019, he was hired by Marc Trestman as the defensive coordinator for the Tampa Bay Vipers of the XFL. Glanville was named head coach of the Conquerors of The Spring League on October 15, 2020.

In February 2026, Glanville was hired as the defensive coordinator of the San Antonio Toros of the Continental Football League.

== Racing career ==
Glanville began racing by learning from seven-time Winston Cup Series champion Dale Earnhardt, who would mentor Glanville in tests at Richmond International Raceway. Glanville officially started his racing career in the NASCAR Busch Grand National Series in 1992 for Lewis Cooper with sponsorship from the Falcons. After failing to qualify in his first career attempt at Lanier Speedway, he made his series debut at Orange County Speedway, finishing 22nd. He ran six races during his three-year timespan in the series, with a best finish of twentieth at Volusia County Speedway in 1992. Glanville returned to the series in 1999, but failed to qualify for all five races he attempted.

Glanville later ran in the ARCA Hooters SuperCar Series, running ten races in 1994 as an owner/driver of the No. 81, and recorded a best finish of ninth at I-70 Speedway. Glanville returned to ARCA in 2000, running a part-time schedule until 2004 for his and Norm Benning's teams, his best finish being fourth at Nashville Superspeedway in 2002.

In 1995, Glanville participated in the Skoal Bandit Copper World Classic, the inaugural SuperTruck Series race, and finished 27th. He continued racing in the Truck Series from 1995 to 1999, with a best finish of fourteenth three times.

In addition to the Busch and Truck Series, Glanville competed in the NASCAR Slim Jim All Pro Series in 1996, finishing 23rd at Gresham Motorsports Park. He later raced in the Winston West Series, his debut coming in 1997 at Pikes Peak International Raceway, where he finished seventh. From 1997 to 1999, he ran eight races in the Hooters Pro Cup, with a best finish of twelfth at Southampton Speedway.

Glanville was also working for CBS Sports during this period, mainly as an NFL studio analyst. Glanville also called several NASCAR Craftsman Truck Series races on CBS/TNN during this period, mainly as a race analyst in the booth.

== In media ==
The Sega Genesis system offered Jerry Glanville's PigSkin Footbrawl, a medieval-themed arcade-style football game. The game was a port of the 1990 classic arcade game Pigskin 621 A.D., released by Bally Midway. Glanville provided soundbites for the game.

== Head coaching record ==
=== National Football League ===
Team	Year	Regular season					Postseason			
Team	Year	Won	Lost	Ties	Win %	Finish	Won	Lost	Win %	Result
HOU	1985	0	2	0	.000	4th in AFC Central	–	–	–	–
HOU	1986	5	11	0	.313	4th in AFC Central	–	–	–	–
HOU	1987	9	6	0	.600	2nd in AFC Central	1	1	.500	Lost to Denver Broncos in Divisional Playoff.
HOU	1988	10	6	0	.625	3rd in AFC Central	1	1	.500	Lost to Buffalo Bills in Divisional Playoff.
HOU	1989	9	7	0	.563	2nd in AFC Central	0	1	.000	Lost to Pittsburgh Steelers in Wild Card Game.
HOU Total		33	32	0	.508		2	3	.400	
ATL	1990	5	11	0	.313	4th in NFC West	–	–	–	
ATL	1991	10	6	0	.625	2nd in NFC West	1	1	.500	Lost to Washington Redskins in Divisional Playoff.
ATL	1992	6	10	0	.375	3rd in NFC West	–	–	–	
ATL	1993	6	10	0	.375	3rd in NFC West	–	–	–	
ATL Total		27	37	0	.422		1	1	.500	
Total		60	69	0	.465		3	4	.429	

=== College ===
Year	Team	Overall	Conference	Standing	Bowl/playoffs
Portland State Vikings (Big Sky Conference) (2007–2009)
2007	Portland State	3–8	3–5	T–6th	
2008	Portland State	4–7	3–5	T–6th	
2009	Portland State	2–9	1–7	8th	
Portland State:		9–24	7–17		
Total:		9–24			

== Motorsports career results ==
=== NASCAR ===
(key) (Bold – Pole position awarded by qualifying time. Italics – Pole position earned by points standings or practice time. * – Most laps led.)

==== Busch Series ====
NASCAR Busch Series results
Year	Team	No.	Make	1	2	3	4	5	6	7	8	9	10	11	12	13	14	15	16	17	18	19	20	21	22	23	24	25	26	27	28	29	30	31	32	NBSC	Pts	Ref
1992	Speedway Motorsports	56	Buick	DAY	CAR	RCH	ATL	MAR	DAR	BR	HCY	LAN; DNQ	DUB	NZH	CLT	DOV	ROU; 22	MYB; 28	GLN	VOL; 20	NHA	TAL	IRP	ROU	MCH	NHA	BRI	DAR	RCH	DOV	CLT	MAR	CAR	HCY		65th	279	
1993	Glanville Motorsports	81	Ford	DAY	CAR; 40	RCH	DAR	BRI	HCY; DNQ	ROU; DNQ	MAR	NZH	CLT	DOV	MYB; 27	GLN	MLW; 26	TAL	IRP	MCH	NHA	BRI	DAR	RCH	DOV	ROU	CLT	MAR	CAR	HCY	ATL; QL^{†}					67th	210	
1994	Glanville Motorsports	81	Ford	DAY	CAR	RCH	ATL	MAR	DAR	HCY; DNQ	BRI	ROU	NHA	NZH	CLT	DOV	MYB	GLN	MLW	SBO	TAL	HCY	IRP	MCH	BRI	DAR	RCH	DOV	CLT	MAR	CAR					NA	-	
1999	Glanville Motorsports	81	Chevy	DAY	CAR	LVS; DNQ	ATL	DAR	TEX	NSV	BRI	TAL	CAL; DNQ	NHA	RCH	NZH	CLT	DOV; DNQ	SBO	GLN	MLW; DNQ	MYB	PPR; DNQ	GTY	IRP	MCH	BRI	DAR	RCH	DOV	CLT	CAR	MEM	PHO	HOM	NA	-	
^{†} – Qualified but replaced by Ronald Cooper

==== Craftsman Truck Series ====
NASCAR Craftsman Truck Series results
Year	Team	No.	Make	1	2	3	4	5	6	7	8	9	10	11	12	13	14	15	16	17	18	19	20	21	22	23	24	25	26	27	NCTC	Pts	Ref
1995	Glanville Motorsports	81	Ford	PHO; 27	TUS; 14	SGS; 19	MMR; DNQ	POR; 18	EVG; 22	I70; 25	LVL; 14	BRI; 22	MLW; 21	CNS; 18	HPT; 32	IRP; 18	FLM; 17	RCH; 22	MAR	NWS	SON	MMR	PHO								18th	1482	
1996	Glanville Motorsports	81	Ford	HOM; 22	PHO; 20	POR	EVG	TUS; 22	CNS; 22	HPT	BRI	NZH	MLW; 14	LVL	I70	IRP	FLM	GLN	NSV	RCH	NHA	MAR	NWS	SON	MMR	PHO	LVS				43rd	515	
1997	Glanville Motorsports	81	Ford	WDW	TUS	HOM; DNQ	PHO; 32	POR	EVG	I70	NHA	TEX	BRI	NZH	MLW; 29	LVL	CNS	HPT	IRP	FLM	NSV	GLN	RCH	MAR	SON	MMR	CAL	PHO	LVS		92nd	150	
1998	Glanville Motorsports	81	Ford	WDW	HOM	PHO; INQ^{†}	POR	EVG	I70	GLN	TEX	BRI	MLW; DNQ	NZH	CAL; 26	PPR; 36	IRP	NHA	FLM	NSV; DNQ	HPT	LVL	RCH	MEM	GTY	MAR	SON	MMR	PHO	LVS	61st	223	
1999	Glanville Motorsports	81	Ford	HOM	PHO; 24	EVG	MMR	MAR	MEM	PPR; 27	I70	BRI	TEX	PIR	GLN	MLW; 26	NSV	NZH	MCH	NHA; 23	IRP	GTY	HPT	RCH	LVS	LVL	TEX	CAL			47th	352	
^{†} – Qualified but replaced by Randy Nelson

==== Winston West Series ====
NASCAR Winston West Series results
Year	Team	No.	Make	1	2	3	4	5	6	7	8	9	10	11	12	13	14	NWWC	Pts	Ref
1997	Glanville Motorsports	81	Ford	TUS	AMP	SON	TUS	MMR	LVS	CAL	EVG	POR	PPR; 7	AMP	SON	MMR	LVS	58th	146	
1998	Glanville Motorsports	81	Ford	TUS	LVS; 3	PHO	CAL	HPT	MMR	AMP	POR	CAL; 21	PPR; 7	EVG	SON	MMR	LVS	35th	411	
1999	Glanville Motorsports	81	Ford	TUS	LVS; 18	PHO; 17	CAL; 16	PPR; 18	MMR	IRW	EVG	POR	IRW	RMR	LVS	MMR	MOT	33rd	445	
2000	Glanville Motorsports	81	Ford	PHO	MMR	LVS; 11	CAL; 6	LAG	IRW	POR	EVG	IRW	RMR	MMR	IRW			34th	280	

=== ARCA Re/Max Series ===
(key) (Bold – Pole position awarded by qualifying time. Italics – Pole position earned by points standings or practice time. * – Most laps led.)

ARCA Re/Max Series results
Year	Team	No.	Make	1	2	3	4	5	6	7	8	9	10	11	12	13	14	15	16	17	18	19	20	21	22	23	24	25	ARMC	Pts	Ref
1994	Glanville Motorsports	81	Ford	DAY	TAL; 29	FIF; 15	LVL; 14	KIL; 22	TOL; 11	FRS; 13	MCH; 15	DMS; 9	POC; 29	POC	KIL	FRS	INF	I70; 8	ISF	DSF	TOL	SLM	WIN	ATL					18th	1745	
2000	Glanville Motorsports	81	Ford	DAY	SLM	AND	CLT; 27	KIL	FRS	MCH; 34	POC	TOL; 27	KEN	BLN	POC	WIN	ISF	KEN	DSF	SLM	CLT	TAL	ATL						78th	250	
2001	Glanville Motorsports	81	Ford	DAY	NSH	WIN	SLM	GTY	KEN; 10	CLT; 35	KAN	MCH; 4	POC	MEM	GLN	KEN; 19	MCH; 6	POC	NSH	ISF	CHI	DSF	SLM	TOL	BLN	CLT	TAL	ATL	46th	790	
2002	Glanville Motorsports	81	Ford	DAY	ATL	NSH; 4	SLM	KEN; 19	CLT; 18	KAN; 37	POC	MCH; 35	TOL	SBO	KEN; 6	BLN	POC	NSH; 10	ISF	WIN	DSF	CHI	SLM	TAL	CLT				31st	965	
2003	Glanville Motorsports	81	Dodge	DAY	ATL	NSH; 6	SLM	TOL	KEN; DNQ	CLT	BLN	KAN	MCH	LER	POC	POC	NSH	ISF	WIN	DSF	CHI	SLM	TAL	CLT	SBO				113th	225	
2004	Norm Benning Racing	8	Dodge	DAY	NSH	SLM	KEN	TOL	CLT	KAN	POC	MCH; 23	SBO	BLN	KEN	GTW	POC	LER	NSH	ISF	TOL	DSF	CHI	SLM	TAL				150th	115	
