= Lynn Madsen =

American football player (born 1960)

No. 98
- Position: Defensive tackle

Personal information
- Born: August 8, 1960 (age 66); Blair, Nebraska, U.S.
- Listed height: 6 ft 4 in (1.93 m)
- Listed weight: 260 lb (118 kg)

Career information
- High school: Vista (CA)
- College: Washington
- Supplemental draft: 1984: 3rd round, 58th overall pick

Career history
- New Jersey Generals (1984–1985); Houston Oilers (1986); Saskatchewan Roughriders (1987); Ottawa Rough Riders (1988)

Awards and highlights
- Second-team All-Pac-10 (1983)
- Stats at Pro Football Reference

Lynn Madsen (born August 8, 1960) is an American former professional football player who was a defensive tackle in the National Football League (NFL). He was selected by the Houston Oilers in the third round of the 1984 Supplemental Draft with the 58th overall pick. He played for the New Jersey Generals from 1984 to 1985, the Houston Oilers in 1986, the Saskatchewan Roughriders in 1987 and for the Ottawa Rough Riders in 1988.
