= Frank Bush =

American football player and coach (born 1963)

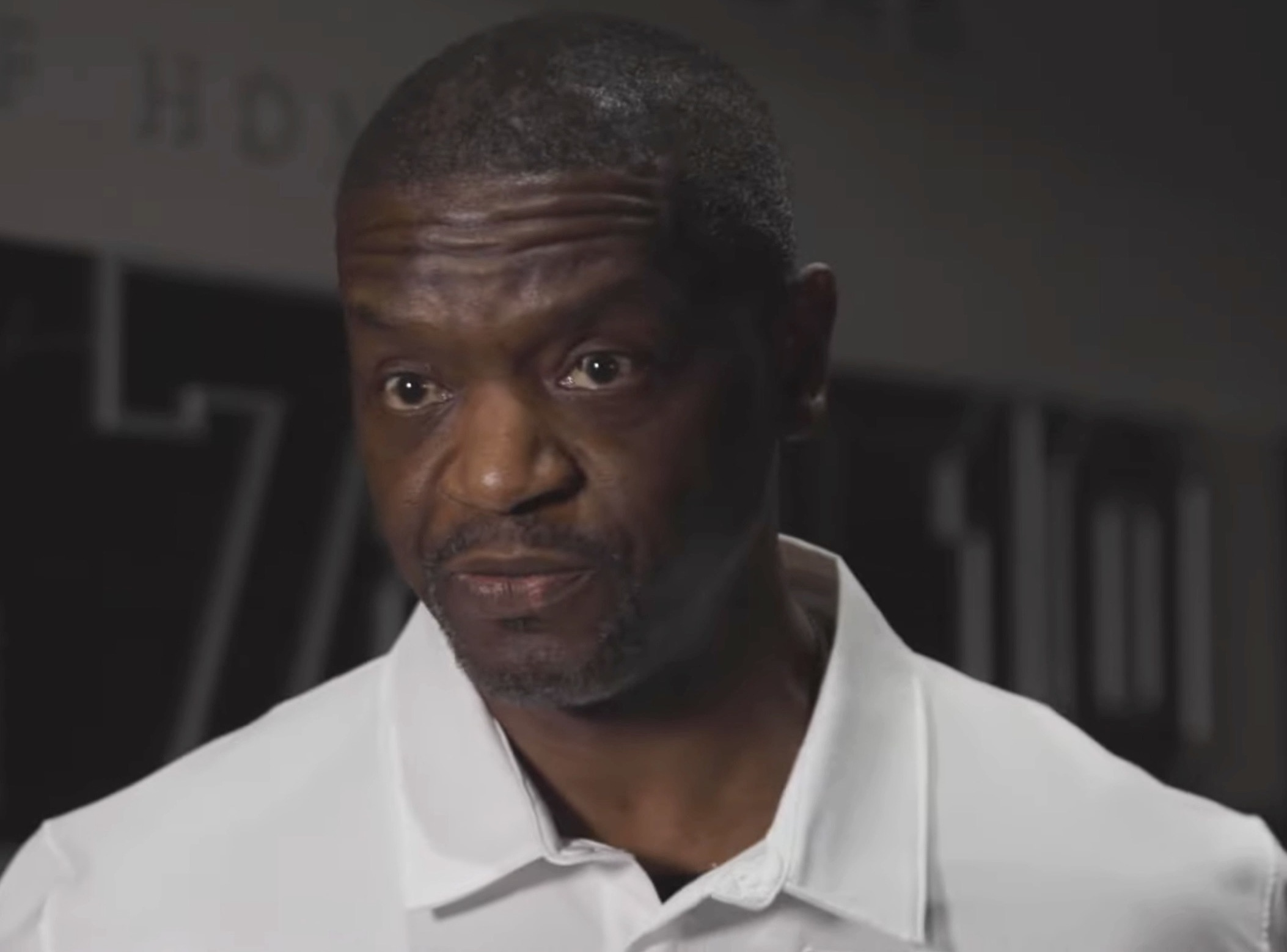
- Bush in 2022

New York Giants
- Title: Inside linebackers coach

Personal information
- Born: January 10, 1963 (age 63); Athens, Georgia, U.S.
- Listed height: 6 ft 1 in (1.85 m)
- Listed weight: 218 lb (99 kg)

Career information
- Position: Linebacker (No. 94)
- High school: Clarke Central (Athens)
- College: North Carolina State
- NFL draft: 1985: 5th round, 133rd overall pick

Career history

Playing
- Houston Oilers (1985–1986)

Coaching
- Houston Oilers (1993–1994) Linebackers coach; Denver Broncos (1995–1999) Linebackers coach; Denver Broncos (2000–2003) Secondary coach & special teams coach; Arizona Cardinals (2004–2005) Linebackers coach; Arizona Cardinals (2006) Assistant head coach & linebackers coach; Houston Texans (2007–2008) Senior defensive assistant; Houston Texans (2009–2010) Defensive coordinator; Tennessee Titans (2011–2012) Linebackers coach; St. Louis / Los Angeles Rams (2013–2016) Linebackers coach; Miami Dolphins (2017–2018) Assistant head coach & linebackers coach; New York Jets (2019–2020) Assistant head coach & inside linebackers coach; New York Jets (2020) Interim defensive coordinator; Atlanta Falcons (2021–2023) Linebackers coach; Tennessee Titans (2024–2025) Linebackers coach; New York Giants (2026–present) Inside linebackers coach

Operations
- Houston Oilers (1987–1992) College scout

Awards and highlights
- 2× Super Bowl champion (XXXII, XXXIII)

Career NFL statistics
- Sacks: 4
- Fumble recoveries: 3
- Stats at Pro Football Reference
- Coaching profile at Pro Football Reference

Frank Everett Bush (born January 10, 1963) is an American professional football coach and former linebacker who is the inside linebackers coach for the New York Giants of the National Football League (NFL). He was selected by the Houston Oilers in the fifth round of the 1985 NFL draft. He played college football for the NC State Wolfpack.

== Playing career ==
Bush was selected by the Houston Oilers in the fifth round of the 1985 NFL draft. As a rookie, he started 11 of 16 games recording three sacks. During his second season in 1986 he started the first three games of the season when an examination following an injury, revealed that he had a narrow spinal canal. This condition, not caused by play, made it too risky for him to continue playing.

== Coaching career ==
=== Houston Oilers ===
In 1987, Bush was hired by the Oilers to be their college scout and he remained at the position until 1992 when he was promoted to linebackers coach. He served as the team's linebackers coach until 1994.

=== Denver Broncos ===
From 1995 to 1999 Bush served as the Denver Broncos linebackers coach under Mike Shanahan and was a member of the teams back-to-back Super Bowl victories over the Green Bay Packers in Super Bowl XXXII and Atlanta Falcons in Super Bowl XXXIII. In 2000, he served as the secondary/nickel package coach and was the special teams coach from 2001 to 2003.

=== Arizona Cardinals ===
From 2004 to 2006, Bush served as linebackers coach for the Arizona Cardinals under Dennis Green. Along with being the linebackers coach in 2006, he was also the assistant head coach to Green.

=== Houston Texans ===
From 2007 to 2008, Bush served as the Houston Texans’ senior defensive assistant under head coach Gary Kubiak. Before the 2009 season, Bush was promoted to defensive coordinator. He was fired at the end of the 2010 season after the Texans finished third-to-last in the NFL in total defense.

=== Tennessee Titans (first stint) ===
On February 16, 2011, Bush was hired as the new linebacker coach of the Tennessee Titans.

=== St. Louis/Los Angeles Rams ===
Bush spent four seasons as linebackers coach for the St. Louis/Los Angeles Rams, from 2013 to 2016.

=== Miami Dolphins ===
On January 19, 2017, Bush was hired as assistant head coach and linebackers coach of the Miami Dolphins, after Matt Burke was promoted to defensive coordinator a week before as the replacement for Vance Joseph, who left to become head coach of the Denver Broncos.

=== New York Jets ===
On February 8, 2019 The New York Jets hired Bush as their inside linebackers coach. Following a loss to the Las Vegas Raiders in the final seconds of their Week 13 matchup, defensive coordinator Gregg Williams was fired with Bush taking his place.

=== Atlanta Falcons ===
On January 22, 2021, the Atlanta Falcons hired Bush to be their linebackers coach. He held the position for three seasons, but was not retained following the end of the 2023 season and the hiring of Raheem Morris as the Falcons' new head coach.

=== Tennessee Titans (second stint) ===
On February 13, 2024, Bush was hired by the Tennessee Titans as their linebackers coach under new head coach Brian Callahan.

=== New York Giants ===
On February 13, 2026, the New York Giants hired Bush as their inside linebackers coach under head coach John Harbaugh.
