= Jesse Baker (American football) =

American football player (1957–1999)

No. 75, 66
- Position: Defensive end

Personal information
- Born: July 10, 1957; Conyers, Georgia, U.S.
- Died: January 16, 1999 (aged 41); Texas, U.S.
- Listed height: 6 ft 5 in (1.96 m)
- Listed weight: 269 lb (122 kg)

Career information
- High school: Rockdale County (GA)
- College: Jacksonville State
- NFL draft: 1979: 2nd round, 50th overall pick

Career history
- Houston Oilers (1979–1986); Dallas Cowboys (1986); Houston Oilers (1987)

Awards and highlights
- PFWA All-Rookie Team (1979)

Career NFL statistics
- Sacks: 67
- Fumble recoveries: 5
- Touchdowns: 1
- Stats at Pro Football Reference

Jesse Lewis Baker (July 10, 1957 – January 16, 1999) was an American professional football player who was a defensive end in the National Football League (NFL) for the Houston Oilers and the Dallas Cowboys.

Baker played high school football for the Rockdale County High School Bulldogs in Conyers, Georgia in 1973 and 1974, where he earned all-state first-team honors both years. He was also a stand-out in track and field. He played college football at Jacksonville State University (JSU); while he was there, he was defensive MVP of the 1977 Grantland Rice Bowl, and was inducted to the JSU Hall of Fame in 1989. Baker was selected 50th overall in the second round of the 1979 NFL draft.

Baker played nine seasons in the NFL with the Oilers. He recorded 15.5 quarterback sacks and returned a fumble for a touchdown in his rookie season in 1979, despite starting only two of 16 games. He recorded 6.5 sacks in 1980 and 10 more in 1981 as a part-timer before becoming a starter in the strike shortened 1982 season. Baker started 57 consecutive games and recorded 29.5 more sacks. He died from an enlarged heart when he was 41.
