= Richard Byrd (American football) =

American football player (born 1962)

No. 71
- Position: Nose tackle

Personal information
- Born: March 20, 1962 (age 64); Natchez, Mississippi, U.S.
- Listed height: 6 ft 3 in (1.91 m)
- Listed weight: 264 lb (120 kg)

Career information
- High school: Jim Hill (Jackson, Mississippi)
- College: Southern Miss
- NFL draft: 1985: 2nd round, 36th overall pick

Career history
- Houston Oilers (1985–1989)

Awards and highlights
- First-team All-South Independent (1984); Second-team All-South Independent (1983)

Career NFL statistics
- Games played: 75
- Games started: 42
- Sacks: 5
- Interceptions: 1
- Fumble recoveries: 4
- Stats at Pro Football Reference

Richard Ellen Byrd (born March 20, 1962) is an American former professional football player who was a nose tackle for five seasons with the Houston Oilers of the National Football League (NFL) from 1985 to 1989.

== Playing career ==
Richard Byrd played football for Jim Hill High School. Byrd played collegiately for the Southern Miss Golden Eagles. He earned All-South Independent second-team honors in 1983 and first-team honors in 1984.

He spent five years in the NFL on the Houston Oilers, who selected him in the second round of the 1985 NFL draft.
