= Jim Romano (American football) =

American football player (born 1959)

No. 52, 55
- Position: Center

Personal information
- Born: September 7, 1959 (age 67); Glen Cove, New York, U.S.
- Listed height: 6 ft 3 in (1.91 m)
- Listed weight: 260 lb (118 kg)

Career information
- High school: North Shore (Glen Head, New York)
- College: Penn State
- NFL draft: 1982: 2nd round, 28th overall pick

Career history
- Los Angeles Raiders (1982–1984); Houston Oilers (1984-1986); New England Patriots (1987)*
- * Offseason or practice squad member only

Awards and highlights
- Super Bowl champion (XVIII); Second-team All-East (1981)

Career NFL statistics
- Games played: 45
- Games started: 34
- Stats at Pro Football Reference

James John Romano (born September 7, 1959) is an American former professional football player who was a center in the National Football League (NFL). He played six seasons for the Houston Oilers, New England Patriots and Los Angeles Raiders.

Romano was originally selected 28th overall by the Los Angeles Raiders in the second round of the 1982 draft.
