= Avon Riley =

American football player (1958–2020)

No. 53, 99
- Position: Linebacker

Personal information
- Born: February 10, 1958; Savannah, Georgia, U.S.
- Died: July 2, 2020 (aged 62); Houston, Texas, U.S.
- Listed height: 6 ft 3 in (1.91 m)
- Listed weight: 230 lb (104 kg)

Career information
- High school: Savannah
- College: UCLA
- NFL draft: 1981: 9th round, 243rd overall pick

Career history
- Houston Oilers (1981–1986); Pittsburgh Steelers (1987); Miami Dolphins (1997)*
- * Offseason or practice squad member only

Awards and highlights
- First-team All-Pac-10 (1980)

Career NFL statistics
- Sacks: 6.5
- Interceptions: 3
- Fumble recoveries: 6
- Stats at Pro Football Reference

Avon Riley (February 10, 1958 – July 2, 2020) was an American professional football player who was a linebacker in the National Football League (NFL). He was selected by the Houston Oilers in the ninth round of the 1981 NFL draft. He played college football for the UCLA Bruins. Riley also played for the Pittsburgh Steelers.

He died on July 2, 2020, in Houston, Texas, at age 62.
