= Allen Lyday =

American football player (born 1960)

No. 28
- Position: Defensive back

Personal information
- Born: September 16, 1960 (age 66); Wichita, Kansas, U.S.
- Listed height: 5 ft 10 in (1.78 m)
- Listed weight: 190 lb (86 kg)

Career information
- High school: Wichita South
- College: Nebraska
- NFL draft: 1984: undrafted

Career history
- Kansas City Chiefs (1983)*; Houston Oilers (1984–1987)
- * Offseason or practice squad member only

Career NFL statistics
- Interceptions: 4
- Fumble recoveries: 1
- Stats at Pro Football Reference

Allen Clark Lyday (born September 16, 1960) is an American former professional football player who was a defensive back for the Houston Oilers of the National Football League (NFL). He first played college football for the Texas Southern Tigers before transferring to the Nebraska Cornhuskers.

== Early life ==
Allen Clark Lyday was born on September 16, 1960, in Wichita, Kansas. He attended Wichita South High School, where he participated in wrestling and football.

== College career ==
Lyday first enrolled at Texas Southern University as a punter. He then transferred to the University of Nebraska–Lincoln to try out for the wrestling team but did not end up wrestling there. He was member of the Nebraska Cornhuskers football team from 1980 to 1982 and a two-year letterman from 1981 to 1982.

== Professional career ==
After going undrafted in the 1983 NFL draft, Lyday signed with the Kansas City Chiefs on April 28. He was released on August 29, 1983.

Lyday was signed by the Houston Oilers on April 6, 1984. He was released on August 20 but later resigned on October 25. He then played in four games for the Oilers during the 1984 season, recording one interception, before being placed on injured reserve on November 21, 1984. He was released the next year on September 3, 1985, and later re-signed on September 26, 1985. Lyday appeared in 13 games during the 1985 season, totaling one kick return for six yards, one fumble, and one fumble recovery. He played in the first four games of the 1986 season before being placed on injured reserve on October 1. He was later activated on October 31 and played in the final eight games of the season, recording three interceptions. Lyday appeared in seven games for the Oilers in 1987 before being placed on injured reserve again on November 23, 1987. He became a free agent after the 1987 season.
