= Robert Abraham (American football) =

American football player (born 1960)

No. 56
- Position: Linebacker

Personal information
- Born: July 13, 1960 (age 66); Myrtle Beach, South Carolina, U.S.
- Listed height: 6 ft 1 in (1.85 m)
- Listed weight: 280 lb (127 kg)

Career information
- High school: Myrtle Beach
- College: North Carolina State
- NFL draft: 1982: 3rd round, 77th overall pick

Career history
- Houston Oilers (1982–1987); New York Giants (1988)*
- * Offseason or practice squad member only

Career NFL statistics
- Sacks: 4.0
- Fumble recoveries: 6
- Interceptions: 2
- Stats at Pro Football Reference

Robert Eugene Abraham (born July 13, 1960) is an American former professional football player who was a linebacker who played college football for North Carolina State. He was selected by the Houston Oilers in the third round of the 1982 NFL draft with the 77th overall pick. He played there until 1988, mostly as a starter. His best season came in 1984 when he started 16 games and had 106 solo tackles and 92 assists. He missed most of his final season with the team due to injuries. He was waived by the Oilers in March 1988 but signed with the New York Giants shortly later. However, he was waived by the Giants in August the same year prior to the start of the season.
