= Don Maggs =

American football player (born 1961)

No. 76, 78
- Positions: Tackle, Guard

Personal information
- Born: November 1, 1961 (age 65); Youngstown, Ohio, U.S.
- Listed height: 6 ft 5 in (1.96 m)
- Listed weight: 265 lb (120 kg)

Career information
- High school: Cardinal Mooney (Youngstown)
- College: Tulane
- Supplemental draft: 1984: 2nd round, 29th overall pick

Career history
- Pittsburgh Maulers (1984); New Jersey Generals (1985); Houston Oilers (1986–1992); Denver Broncos (1993–1994)

Awards and highlights
- Second-team All-American (1983)

Career NFL statistics
- Games played: 110
- Stats at Pro Football Reference

Donald James Maggs (born November 1, 1961) is an American former professional football player who was a tackle and guard in the United States Football League (USFL) and National Football League (NFL).

Maggs was born and raised in Youngstown, Ohio, and played scholastically at Cardinal Mooney High School. He played collegiately for the Tulane Green Wave, where, as a senior, he was honored by Gannett News Service (GNS) as a second-team All-American.

Following college, Maggs played in the USFL for the Pittsburgh Maulers (1984) and New Jersey Generals (1985). He was selected by the Houston Oilers in the second round of the 1984 NFL supplemental draft, and they retained his rights when he chose to stay in the USFL. When the USFL ceased operations following the 1985 season, Maggs joined the Oilers. He was with the Oilers for seven seasons, 1986 - 1992, spending the 1987 season on the injured reserve list. He then spent two years with the Denver Broncos (1993 - 1994).
