= Tim Smith (wide receiver) =

American football player (born 1957)

No. 83
- Position: Wide receiver

Personal information
- Born: March 20, 1957 (age 69); Tucson, Arizona, U.S.
- Listed height: 6 ft 2 in (1.88 m)
- Listed weight: 201 lb (91 kg)

Career information
- High school: St. Augustine (San Diego, California)
- College: Nebraska
- NFL draft: 1980: 3rd round, 79th overall pick

Career history
- Houston Oilers (1980–1986); San Diego Chargers (1987)*
- * Offseason or practice squad member only

Awards and highlights
- First-team All-Big Eight (1979); Second-team All-Big Eight (1978)

Career NFL statistics
- Receptions: 206
- Receiving yards: 3,107
- Touchdowns: 12
- Stats at Pro Football Reference

Timothy Francis Smith (born March 20, 1957) is an American former professional football player who was a wide receiver for the Houston Oilers of the National Football League (NFL) from 1980 to 1986.

== Early life ==
A native of Chula Vista, California, Smith attended St. Augustine High School in nearby San Diego. He was prepared to play college football for the Notre Dame Fighting Irish until the retirement of their head coach, Ara Parseghian, after which Smith committed to Nebraska.

== College career ==
Smith was a three-year starter at Nebraska, where he had 72 catches for 1,089 yards. He also punted for the Cornhuskers, averaging 40.1 yards on 135 kicks. As a collegian, he played in the Liberty, Orange and Cotton bowls. He was team captain as a senior and was first-team All-Big Eight. Smith was selected to play in the East–West Shrine Bowl.

== Professional career ==
Smith was selected 79th overall in the third round of the draft by the Houston Oilers. He gained more than 1,000 yards receiving in both the 1983 and 1984 seasons.

On April 24, 1987, the San Diego Chargers acquired Smith for a 1988 draft choice.
