= Richard Johnson (defensive back) =

American football player (born 1963)

No. 23
- Position: Cornerback

Personal information
- Born: September 16, 1963 (age 63); Harvey, Illinois, U.S.
- Listed height: 6 ft 1 in (1.85 m)
- Listed weight: 195 lb (88 kg)

Career information
- High school: Thornton Township (IL)
- College: Wisconsin
- NFL draft: 1985: 1st round, 11th overall pick

Career history
- Houston Oilers (1985–1992)

Awards and highlights
- First-team All-American (1984)

Career NFL statistics
- Games: 98
- Interceptions: 15
- Defensive touchdowns: 1
- Stats at Pro Football Reference

Richard James Johnson (born September 16, 1963) is an American former professional football player who was a cornerback for eight seasons with the Houston Oilers of the National Football League (NFL). He was an All-American and All-Big Ten cornerback in 1984 for the Wisconsin Badgers. He was selected by the Oilers in the first round of the 1985 NFL Draft with the 11th overall pick.

Johnson played for the Wisconsin from 1982 to 1984, and as a senior he helped lead the 1984 Badgers team to the Hall of Fame Bowl. That season, he set the school single-season record with six blocked kicks — including three in a single game against Missouri — as well as three interceptions, seven passes defended, and four tackles for a loss. In total, 16 players from that team went on to play in the NFL, and Johnson was one of three first-round draft picks along with Al Toon and Darryl Sims.

Johnson played for the Oilers from 1985 to 1992, appearing in 98 NFL games. He finished his career with 15 interceptions, and had an eight-interception season in 1990.
