= Robert Lyles =

American football player and coach (born 1961)

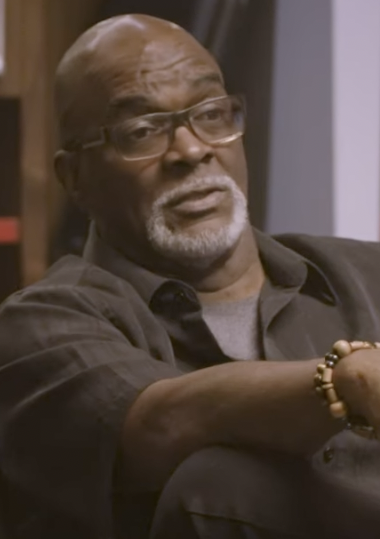
- Lyles in 2021

No. 93, 54
- Position: Linebacker

Personal information
- Born: March 21, 1961 (age 65); Los Angeles, California, U.S.
- Listed height: 6 ft 1 in (1.85 m)
- Listed weight: 226 lb (103 kg)

Career information
- High school: Belmont (Los Angeles)
- College: TCU
- NFL draft: 1984: 5th round, 114th overall pick

Career history

Playing
- Houston Oilers (1984–1990); Atlanta Falcons (1990-1991); Tampa Bay Storm (1994); Memphis Pharaohs (1995)

Coaching
- Portland Forest Dragons (1996-1998) Defensive coordinator; Los Angeles Avengers (1999-2001) Defensive coordinator; Los Angeles Avengers (2001) Head coach; Georgia Force (2002) Head coach; San Bernardino Valley College (2003) Linebackers coach/special teams coach; Grand Rapids Rampage (2004-2005) Defensive coordinator; Army (2007-2013) Linebackers coach; Jackson State (2014) Linebackers coach; Incarnate Word (2015-2017) Linebackers coach; Hamilton Tiger-Cats (2018) Linebackers coach; Houston Roughnecks (2020) Defensive line coach

Career NFL statistics
- Sacks: 10
- Interceptions: 10
- Fumble recoveries: 8
- Stats at Pro Football Reference

Robert Damon Lyles (born March 21, 1961) is an American former professional football player who was a linebacker for eight seasons in the National Football League (NFL) for the Houston Oilers and for the Atlanta Falcons. He played college football for the TCU Horned Frogs. After his playing career, Lyles served as a head coach in Arena Football League (AFL), coaching the Los Angeles Avengers in 2001 and the Georgia Force in 2002.

Lyles suffered multiple strokes in 2022. As of September 2022, he is in critical condition in a Texas hospital and needs a heart transplant. With his NFL health insurance expired, his medical expenses were approximately $100,000 as of September 2022, and friends had raised about half that amount.
