= Johnny Meads =

American football player (born 1961)

No. 91, 93
- Position: Linebacker

Personal information
- Born: June 25, 1961 (age 65); New Orleans, Louisiana, U.S.
- Listed height: 6 ft 2 in (1.88 m)
- Listed weight: 231 lb (105 kg)

Career information
- High school: Napoleonville (LA) Assumption
- College: Nicholls State
- NFL draft: 1984: 3rd round, 56th overall pick

Career history
- Houston Oilers (1984–1992); Washington Redskins (1992)

Career NFL statistics
- Sacks: 23.5
- Interceptions: 1
- Fumble recoveries: 2
- Stats at Pro Football Reference

Johnny Sand Meads (born June 25, 1961) is an American former professional football player who was a linebacker in the National Football League (NFL) for the Houston Oilers from 1984 to 1992 and Washington Redskins in 1992. Meads was selected by the Oilers in the third round of the 1984 NFL draft, and was also a third round (56th overall) selection by the New Orleans Breakers in the 1984 USFL draft.

Meads played college football for the Nicholls State Colonels and high school football at Assumption High School in Napoleonville, Louisiana.

== Later career ==
Meads walked on to the football team at Nicholls State without a scholarship before being drafted into the NFL. After retiring from professional football, he worked as a recruiter, including for the Truck Driver Institute's Milton, Florida campus as of 2019.
