= Patrick Allen (American football) =

American football player (1961–2021)

No. 29
- Position: Cornerback

Personal information
- Born: August 26, 1961; Seattle, Washington, U.S.
- Died: June 22, 2021 (aged 59); Seattle, Washington, U.S.
- Listed height: 5 ft 10 in (1.78 m)
- Listed weight: 180 lb (82 kg)

Career information
- High school: Garfield (Seattle, Washington)
- College: Utah State
- NFL draft: 1984: 4th round, 100th overall pick

Career history
- Houston Oilers (1984–1990); Kansas City Chiefs (1991)*
- * Offseason or practice squad member only

Career NFL statistics
- Interceptions: 7
- Fumble recoveries: 5
- Stats at Pro Football Reference

Lloyd Patrick Allen (August 26, 1961 – June 22, 2021) was an American professional football player who was a cornerback in the National Football League (NFL).

Born in Seattle, Washington, Allen graduated from Utah State University, where he starred as a cornerback. He played seven seasons in the NFL, all with the Houston Oilers. He was selected by the Oilers in the fourth round of the 1984 NFL draft with the 100th overall pick.

Allen was found dead in his Seattle apartment on June 22, 2021. He was aged 59.
