= Ladd Herzeg =

American football executive

Ladd Herzeg is an American professional football executive who was the general manager of the Houston Oilers in the 1980s, under the ownership of Bud Adams. In three years with the Oilers, from 1982 to 1984, he drafted and/or signed three Pro Football Hall of Famers; Mike Munchak, a first round draft choice in 1982, Bruce Matthews, another first round draft choice in 1983 and Warren Moon, a 1984 Canadian Football League signing.
