= Jeff Donaldson (American football) =

American football player (born 1962)

No. 31, 42
- Position: Safety

Personal information
- Born: April 19, 1962 (age 64); Fort Collins, Colorado, U.S.
- Listed height: 6 ft 0 in (1.83 m)
- Listed weight: 191 lb (87 kg)

Career information
- High school: Fort Collins
- College: Colorado
- NFL draft: 1984: 9th round, 225th overall pick

Career history
- Houston Oilers (1984–1989); Kansas City Chiefs (1990); Atlanta Falcons (1991–1993)

Career NFL statistics
- Interceptions: 12
- Sacks: 5.5
- Fumble recoveries: 8
- Stats at Pro Football Reference

Jeffrey Michael Donaldson (born April 19, 1962) is an American former player in the National Football League. He was a safety for the Houston Oilers from 1984 to 1989, the Kansas City Chiefs in 1990, and the Atlanta Falcons from 1991 to 1993.

In 10 seasons he had 5.5 sacks and 12 interceptions for 87 yards. He also had 6 punt returns for 35 yards and 6 kickoff returns for 98 yards.

In college, Donaldson was a defensive back for the University of Colorado. His son, Zach Donaldson, played football at Fort Collins High School was recruited to play for Colorado State Rams.
