= John Grimsley =

American football player (1962–2008)

No. 59
- Position: Linebacker

Personal information
- Born: February 25, 1962; Canton, Ohio, U.S.
- Died: February 6, 2008 (aged 45); Missouri City, Texas, U.S.
- Listed height: 6 ft 2 in (1.88 m)
- Listed weight: 235 lb (107 kg)

Career information
- High school: McKinley
- College: Kentucky
- NFL draft: 1984: 6th round, 141st overall pick

Career history
- Houston Oilers (1984–1990); Miami Dolphins (1991–1993)

Awards and highlights
- All-Pro (1989); Pro Bowl (1988)

Career NFL statistics
- Sacks: 2
- Interceptions: 1
- Fumble recoveries: 9
- Stats at Pro Football Reference

John Glenn Grimsley (February 25, 1962 – February 6, 2008) was an American linebacker in the National Football League (NFL) who played for seven seasons for the Houston Oilers.

Grimsley was born in Canton, Ohio, where he graduated from McKinley High School. He played college football at Kentucky under coach Jerry Claiborne.

Grimsley was selected to the Pro Bowl after the 1988 season. In 1991, he was traded to the Miami Dolphins and stayed there until he retired in 1993.

He died of an accidental gunshot wound at his home in Missouri City, Texas on February 6, 2008. After his death, he was found to have chronic traumatic encephalopathy as a result of repeated hits to the head during his football career. He was one of at least 345 NFL players to be diagnosed after death with this degenerative disease.
