= Tennessee Titans all-time roster =

1,477 players have appeared in at least one regular season or postseason game in the National Football League (NFL) or American Football League (AFL) for the Tennessee Titans franchise since 1960. This list is accurate through the end of the 2025 NFL season.

== A ==
- Mehdi Abdesmad
- Robert Abraham
- Tom Ackerman
- Andrew Adams
- Jamal Adams
- Olasunkanmi Adeniyi
- Xavier Adibi
- Al Afalava
- Mike Akiu
- Allen Aldridge
- Kevin Aldridge
- Melvin Aldridge
- Dan Alexander
- Willie Alexander
- Brandon Allen
- Dalva Allen
- Earl Allen
- Gary Allen
- George Allen
- Patrick Allen
- Ryan Allen
- Colin Allred
- Jeff Alm
- Azeez Al-Shaair
- Mack Alston
- Ugo Amadi
- Eugene Amano
- Jace Amaro
- Ken Amato
- George Amundson
- Abdullah Anderson
- Billy Anderson
- Gary Anderson
- Herbie Anderson
- James Anderson
- Warren Anderson
- Antonio Andrews
- Eli Ankou
- Scott Appleton
- Mike Archie
- Jalyn Armour-Davis
- Adger Armstrong
- Walt Arnold
- Jack Atchason
- Bob Atkins
- James Atkins
- Josh Aubrey
- Denico Autry
- Hank Autry
- Donnie Avery
- Steve Avery
- Tre Avery
- Chidobe Awuzie
- Akeem Ayers
- Elic Ayomanor

== B ==
- Gene Babb
- Jason Babin
- Jordan Babineaux
- Joe Bachie
- Michael Badgley
- Harold Bailey
- Patrick Bailey
- Darrell Baker
- Ed Baker
- Jerome Baker
- Jesse Baker
- Johnny Baker
- Melvin Baker
- Eric Bakhtiari
- Dave Ball
- Tony Banfield
- Chuck Banks
- Robert Banks
- Mike Barber
- Chris Barclay
- Brandon Barden
- Pete Barnes
- Tomur Barnes
- Micheal Barrow
- Cody Barton
- Tarell Basham
- David Bass
- Glenn Bass
- Daren Bates
- Cameron Batson
- Jackie Battle
- Steve Baumgartner
- Byron Beams
- Vic Beasley
- Pete Beathard
- Braden Beck
- Tony Beckham
- Jim Beirne
- Billy Bell
- Byron Bell
- Jacob Bell
- George Belotti
- Drew Bennett
- Duane Benson
- Bruce Bergey
- Eddie Berlin
- Elvin Bethea
- David Beverly
- Ron Billingsley
- Gregg Bingham
- Craig Birdsong
- Rob Bironas
- Blaine Bishop
- Sonny Bishop
- Ross Blacklock
- Angelo Blackson
- Joe Blahak
- Antwon Blake
- George Blanda
- Sid Blanks
- Khari Blasingame
- Amani Bledsoe
- C.J. Board
- Colby Bockwoldt
- Quinton Bohanna
- Rocky Boiman
- Michael Booker
- Breon Borders
- Keith Bostic
- Ron Botchan
- Scott Boucher
- Joe Bowden
- Tyler Boyd
- Garland Boyette
- Danny Brabham
- Brett Brackett
- Craig Bradshaw
- John Brantley
- Robert Brazile
- Brady Breeze
- Aaron Brewer
- Chandler Brewer
- Bobby Brezina
- Tom Briehl
- Beau Brinkley
- Kenny Britt
- Jerry Broadnax
- Tramaine Brock
- Billy Brooks
- Kendell Brooks
- Leo Brooks
- A. J. Brown
- Chris Brown
- Curtis Brown
- Don Brown
- Gary Brown
- Jayon Brown
- Larry Brown
- Mike Brown
- Reggie Brown
- Sonny Brown
- Steve Brown
- Tony Brown (born 1970)
- Tony Brown (born 1980)
- Zach Brown
- Jarvis Brownlee
- Daniel Brunskill
- Logan Bruss
- Domingo Bryant
- Steve Bryant
- Randy Bullock
- Keith Bulluck
- Treylon Burks
- Kaelin Burnett
- Ode Burrell
- Ken Burrough
- Al Burton
- Kendrick Burton
- Frank Bush
- Malcolm Butler
- Skip Butler
- Marion Butts
- Kevin Byard
- Isaac Byrd
- Richard Byrd

== C ==
- Jeremy Cain
- Bryan Caldwell
- Tyrone Calico
- Rocky Calmus
- Rich Camarillo
- Chance Campbell
- Earl Campbell
- Tommie Campbell
- Woody Campbell
- Billy Cannon
- Trenton Cannon
- Cody Carlson
- Rob Carpenter
- Chris Carr
- Levert Carr
- Josh Carraway
- John Carrell
- Ed Carrington
- Ronnie Carroll
- Johnny Carson
- David Carter
- Jamal Carter
- Kevin Carter
- Pat Carter
- Shyheim Carter
- Tory Carter
- Larry Carwell
- Jurrell Casey
- Dave Casper
- Matt Cassel
- Rich Caster
- Toby Caston
- Ronnie Caveness
- Chuck Cecil
- Frank Chamberlin
- Chris Chandler
- John Charles
- B.W. Cheeks
- Julius Chestnut
- Ray Childress
- Ralph Cindrich
- Boobie Clark
- Le'Raven Clark
- Leroy Clark
- Jared Clauss
- Zach Clayton
- Doug Cline
- Charles Clinton
- Jadeveon Clowney
- Rich Coady
- David Cobb
- Eric Cobble
- Keondre Coburn
- Chase Coffman
- Dylan Cole
- Lee Cole
- Linzy Cole
- Chris Coleman
- Pat Coleman
- Ronnie Coleman
- Kerry Collins
- Doug Colman
- Greg Comella
- Dick Compton
- Will Compton
- Jack Conklin
- Chris Conley
- Sean Conover
- Anthony Cook
- Jared Cook
- Rayford Cooks
- Joe Cooper
- Jorge Cordova
- John Corker
- Kamalei Correa
- Mark Cotney
- Al Cowlings
- Morgan Cox
- Perrish Cox
- Donnie Craft
- Dobie Craig
- Casey Cramer
- Jack Crawford
- Brandon Crenshaw-Dickson
- Tae Crowder
- Phil Croyle
- Dane Cruikshank
- Alge Crumpler
- Dwayne Crutchfield
- Yannik Cudjoe-Virgil
- Curley Culp
- Ed Culpepper
- Dick Cunningham
- Zach Cunningham
- Rennie Curran
- Bill Currier
- Bill Curry
- Lloyd Cushenberry III
- Gary Cutsinger
- Johnathan Cyprien

== D ==
- Dennis Daley
- Trevor Daniel
- Al Darby
- Chris Darrington
- Mitch Daum
- Greg Davidson
- Kenny Davidson
- Marlon Davidson
- Pete Davidson
- Anthony Davis
- Bob Davis
- Bruce Davis
- Charlie Davis
- Chris Davis
- Corey Davis
- Donnie Davis
- Hall Davis
- John Davis
- Marvin Davis
- Mike Davis
- Nate Davis
- Rashard Davis
- Willie Davis
- Dalyn Dawkins
- Joe Dawkins
- Doug Dawson
- Keyunta Dawson
- Rhett Dawson
- Jimmy Dean
- Eric Decker
- Al Del Greco
- Tom Dempsey
- Kyle DeVan
- Willard Dewveall
- Matt Dickerson
- Lynn Dickey
- Bo Dickinson
- John Diettrich
- Quandre Diggs
- Chimere Dike
- Christian DiLauro
- Zac Diles
- Andre Dillard
- Gennaro DiNapoli
- Johnnie Dirden
- Cris Dishman
- Joe Dixon
- Joshua Dobbs
- Kevin Dodd
- Kirk Dodge
- JoJo Domann
- Tom Domres
- Jeff Donaldson
- Kevin Donnalley
- Jon Dorenbos
- Andy Dorris
- Anthony Dorsett
- Harry Douglas
- Jamil Douglas
- John Douglas
- Marques Douglas
- Colton Dowell
- Chris Dressel
- Willie Drewrey
- Elbert Drungo
- Khalid Duke
- Mike Dukes
- Mike Dumas
- Brian Duncan
- Curtis Duncan
- Jaelyn Duncan
- Tom Duniven
- Anthony Dunn
- Bud Dupree
- Ryan Durand
- Kenneth Durden
- Kris Durham
- Andre Dyson
- Kevin Dyson
- Nick Dzubnar

== E ==
- Larry Eaglin
- Biren Ealy
- Bo Eason
- Irv Eatman
- Tracey Eaton
- Scott Eccles
- Mike Echols
- Dominique Edison
- Terrell Edmunds
- Emmett Edwards
- Lavar Edwards
- Mario Edwards Jr.
- Stan Edwards
- Pannel Egboh
- Larry Elkins
- Rich Ellender
- Aaron Elling
- Ken Ellis
- Hicham El-Mashtoub
- Kaiir Elam
- Jimbo Elrod
- Keith Embray
- Justin Ena
- Bob Evans
- Darren Evans
- Darrynton Evans
- Josh Evans
- Norm Evans
- Rashaan Evans
- Nick Eyre

== F ==
- Leonard Fairley
- Eric Fairs
- Stan Fanning
- Mike Fanucci
- Caleb Farley
- Matthias Farley
- Miller Farr
- Brett Faryniarz
- Anthony Fasano
- Staley Faulkner
- Greg Favors
- Gene Ferguson
- Vagas Ferguson
- Angelo Fields
- Sharif Finch
- Cortland Finnegan
- Anthony Firkser
- Bryce Fisher
- Ed Fisher
- Jason Fisk
- Dez Fitzpatrick
- Ryan Fitzpatrick
- John Flannery
- Troy Fleming
- Don Floyd
- Malcolm Floyd
- David Fluellen
- Moise Fokou
- Nick Folk
- Bernard Ford
- Henry Ford
- Jacob Ford
- D'Onta Foreman
- Eddie Foster
- Jerome Foster
- Jalston Fowler
- Jerry Fowler
- Ryan Fowler
- Scott Fox
- Doug France
- Jerrell Franklin
- Charley Frazier
- Wayne Frazier
- Willie Frazier
- Mike Frederick
- Solomon Freelon
- Dick Frey
- Toni Fritsch
- John Frongillo
- Vincent Fuller
- William Fuller
- Kristian Fulton
- Tom Funchess
- Will Furrer

== G ==
- Blaine Gabbert
- Justin Gage
- Andy Gallik
- Quinton Ganther
- Teddy Garcia
- Gilbert Gardner
- Rich Gardner
- Gary Garrison
- Eric Garror
- Ali Gaye
- Mark Gehring
- Justin Geisinger
- Eddie George
- Spencer George
- Roy Gerela
- Willie Germany
- Brandon Ghee
- Jack Gibbens
- Luke Gifford
- Reggie Gilbert
- Jimmie Giles
- Trevis Gipson
- David Givens
- Ernest Givins
- Fred Glick
- Phil Glover
- Randall Godfrey
- Mike Golic
- Tom Goode
- Zaviar Gooden
- Brian Goodman
- Amon Gordon
- Bobby Gordon
- Josh Gordon
- Richard Gordon
- Jeff Gossett
- Stephen Gostkowski
- Tay Gowan
- Rick Graf
- Aaron Graham
- Daniel Graham
- Hoyle Granger
- Wes Grant
- Cedric Gray
- Jerry Gray
- Ken Gray
- Leon Gray
- Mel Gray
- Gary Greaves
- Dave Green
- Mike Green
- Sammy Green
- Dorial Green-Beckham
- Shonn Greene
- Bob Gresham
- Larry Griffin
- Michael Griffin
- John Grimsley
- Bill Groman
- Jeff Groth
- Quentin Groves
- Sam Gruneisen
- Gregg Guenther
- Paul Guidry
- Buzz Guy
- John Guzik

== H ==
- John Hadl
- Derek Hagan
- Mac Haik
- Mike Halapin
- Ahmard Hall
- Carlos Hall
- Kemon Hall
- Kenneth Hall
- Lemanski Hall
- Erick Hallett
- Arlington Hambright
- Woodrow Hamilton
- Bob Hamm
- Blake Hance
- Da'Shawn Hand
- Travis Hannah
- Justin Hardee
- Don Hardeman
- Edd Hargett
- Ronnie Harmon
- Jamie Harper
- Nick Harper
- Jaylen Harrell
- Brandon Harris
- Corey Harris
- DaJohn Harris
- Davontae Harris
- Jackie Harris
- Leonard Harris
- Leroy Harris
- Marcus Harris
- Nigel Harris
- Odie Harris
- Tuff Harris
- Bobby Hart
- Ben Hartsock
- Carter Hartwig
- Justin Hartwig
- Claude Harvey
- Hassan Haskins
- Matt Hasselbeck
- Derrick Hatchett
- Dennis Havig
- Chris Hawkins
- Lavelle Hawkins
- Nate Hawkins
- Jovan Haye
- Jim Hayes
- William Hayes
- Conway Hayman
- Alvin Haymond
- Albert Haynesworth
- Johnny Hekker
- Jerry Helluin
- Gunnar Helm
- Thomas Henderson
- Steve Hendrickson
- Charlie Hennigan
- Chris Henry
- Derrick Henry
- Travis Henry
- Craig Hentrich
- Bill Herchman
- Kelly Herndon
- Dwone Hicks
- Skip Hicks
- W. K. Hicks
- Alonzo Highsmith
- Buzz Highsmith
- Darrell Hill
- Drew Hill
- Greg Hill
- Kent Hill
- Reynaldo Hill
- Sammie Lee Hill
- Dontrell Hilliard
- Glen Ray Hines
- Eddie Hinton
- Terry Hoage
- Fred Hoaglin
- Reggie Hodges
- Dalton Hoffman
- Kevin Hogan
- Robert Holcombe
- Henry Holligan
- Cody Hollister
- Kenny Holmes
- Pat Holmes
- Robert Holmes
- Mike Holston
- Roderick Hood
- Amani Hooker
- Austin Hooper
- Mitch Hoopes
- Chris Hope
- Andy Hopkins
- Brad Hopkins
- DeAndre Hopkins
- Roy Hopkins
- Cam Horsley
- Ken Houston
- Leroy Howard
- Ty Howard
- Pat Howell
- Ian Howfield
- Chris Hubbard
- Tommy Hudson
- Marqueston Huff
- Buddy Humphrey
- Adam Humphries
- Calvin Hunt
- Daryl Hunt
- Kevin Hunt
- Herman Hunter
- Justin Hunter
- Torey Hunter
- Ed Husmann
- Steve Hutchinson

== I ==
- Pete Ittersagen
- Joey Ivie
- Chidi Iwuoma
- Ryan Izzo

== J ==
- Adoree' Jackson
- Andrew Jackson
- Bobby Jackson
- Chris Jackson (born 1975)
- Chris Jackson (born 1998)
- Jha'Quan Jackson
- Kearis Jackson
- Kenny Jackson
- Matthew Jackson
- Ray Jackson
- Steve Jackson
- Curtis Jacobs
- Arrike James
- John James
- Al Jamison
- Bobby Jancik
- Pete Jaquess
- Charles Jefferson
- Thad Jefferson
- Van Jefferson
- Haywood Jeffires
- Al Jenkins
- DeRon Jenkins
- Janoris Jenkins
- Darius Jennings
- Gabe Jeudy-Lally
- Pete Johns
- Al Johnson
- Alex Johnson
- Andre Johnson
- Antonio Johnson
- Austin Johnson
- Benny Johnson
- Billy Johnson
- Byron Johnson
- Charley Johnson
- Chris Johnson
- Doug Johnson
- Ezra Johnson
- Jaleel Johnson
- John Henry Johnson
- Kenny Johnson
- Lee Johnson
- Lonnie Johnson Jr.
- Marcus Johnson
- Mike Johnson
- Quinn Johnson
- Rashad Johnson
- Rich Johnson
- Richard Johnson
- Robert Johnson
- Steven Johnson
- Tracy Johnson
- Walter Johnson
- Zack Johnson
- Mark Johnston
- Charlie Joiner
- Tim Joiner
- Lewis Jolley
- Adam Jones
- Ben Jones
- Brandon Jones
- Chris Jones
- DaQuan Jones
- Dre'Mont Jones
- Ernest Jones
- Gene Jones
- Harris Jones
- Jason Jones
- Joseph Jones
- Julio Jones
- Lenoy Jones
- Mark Jones
- Mike Jones
- Naquan Jones
- Quintin Jones
- Roger Jones
- Sean Jones
- Spike Jones
- Terren Jones
- Tony Jones
- Truman Jones
- Victor Jones
- Willie Jones
- Greg Joseph
- Johnathan Joseph
- Sebastian Joseph-Day
- Larry Joyner
- Willie Joyner

== K ==
- Kevin Kaesviharn
- Kurt Kafentzis
- Joshua Kalu
- Sanoussi Kane
- Brad Kassell
- Bill Kay
- Jevon Kearse
- Stanford Keglar
- Doug Kellermeyer
- Joshua Kelley
- Mike Kelley
- Bob Kelly
- Dennis Kelly
- Florian Kempf
- Anthony Kendall
- Charlie Kendall
- Ken Kennard
- Mike Kennedy
- Joey Kent
- Randy Kerbow
- Brett Kern
- Arden Key
- Billy Kidd
- Darius Kilgo
- Terry Killens
- Terry Kinard
- Keith Kinderman
- Steve Kiner
- Claude King
- David King
- Desmond King
- Eric King
- Kenny King
- Erron Kinney
- George Kinney
- Mason Kinsey
- Ernest Kirk
- Josh Kline
- Jack Klotz
- Karl Klug
- Leander Knight
- Kurt Knoff
- Kris Kocurek
- Mark Koncar
- Scott Kozak
- Jordan Kramer
- Dave Krieg
- Troy Kropog
- Rod Kush

== L ==
- Travis LaBoy
- Ernie Ladd
- Josh Lambo
- Kendall Lamm
- Harold Landry
- Dan Lanphear
- Jack Laraway
- Eric Larkin
- JC Latham
- Lamar Lathon
- Jason Layman
- Mike Leach
- Monte Ledbetter
- Jacky Lee
- Jim LeMoine
- Jerry LeVias
- Corey Levin
- Will Levis
- Andy Levitre
- Taylor Lewan
- Darryll Lewis
- Dion Lewis
- Jess Lewis
- Kendrick Lewis
- Rich Lewis
- Roderick Lewis
- John Little
- Jake Locker
- Tyler Lockett
- Bennie Logan
- James Logan
- David Long Jr.
- Kevin Long
- Rien Long
- Joe Looney
- Daniel Loper
- Ron Lou
- Calvin Loveall
- Calvin Lowry
- Oliver Luck
- Dennis Lundy
- Deuce Lutui
- Allen Lyday
- Robert Lyles
- Corey Lynch
- James Lynch
- Pratt Lyons

== M ==
- Greg Mabin
- Isaiah Mack
- Lynn Madsen
- Don Maggs
- Jesse Mahelona
- Joe Majors
- Kevin Malast
- Archie Manning
- Bobby Maples
- Chester Marcol
- Ed Marcontell
- Marc Mariani
- Marcus Mariota
- Sen'Derrick Marks
- Bud Marshall
- Wilber Marshall
- Charles Martin
- Manny Martin
- Matt Martin
- Mike Martin
- Tay Martin
- David Martin-Robinson
- Lonnie Marts
- Tyler Marz
- Derrick Mason
- Le'Shai Maston
- Jason Mathews
- Bruce Matthews
- Kevin Matthews
- Rishard Matthews
- Steve Matthews
- John Matuszak
- Carl Mauck
- Matt Mauck
- Dorian Mausi
- Kevin Mawae
- Alvin Maxson
- Tommy Maxwell
- Ben Mayes
- Ron Mayo
- Damon Mays
- Jason McAddley
- Tre McBride
- Brice McCain
- Jim McCanless
- Keith McCants
- Justin McCareins
- Colin McCarthy
- Mike McCloskey
- Dexter McCluster
- Bubba McCollum
- Brian McConnell
- Jason McCourty
- Roger McCreary
- George McCullough
- Wahoo McDaniel
- Ron McDole
- Keith McDonald
- Bradley McDougald
- Bubba McDowell
- Bud McFadin
- Scott McGarrahan
- Kanavis McGhee
- James McKeehan
- TK McLendon
- Bob McLeod
- Racey McMath
- Raekwon McMillan
- Audray McMillian
- Steve McNair
- Todd McNair
- Clifton McNeil
- Gerald McNeil
- Jeremy McNichols
- Gerald McRath
- Darryl Meadows
- Johnny Meads
- Shad Meier
- Dudley Meredith
- Jamon Meredith
- Guido Merkens
- Zach Mettenberger
- John Meyer
- Rich Michael
- Doug Mikolas
- Bill Miller
- Clay Miller
- Fred Miller
- Josh Miller
- Ralph Miller
- John Henry Mills
- Charlie Milstead
- Christopher Milton
- Jordan Mims
- Frank Miotke
- Donald Mitchell
- Leroy Mitchell
- Terrance Mitchell
- Bryant Mix
- Dontay Moch
- Elijah Molden
- Glenn Montgomery
- Greg Montgomery
- Mike Montgomery
- Warren Moon
- Collin Mooney
- A. J. Moore
- Chris Moore
- Dan Moore
- Ricky Moore
- Zeke Moore
- Eric Moran
- Derrick Morgan
- Karl Morgan
- Larry Moriarty
- Mike Moroski
- Aric Morris
- Dennit Morris
- Ron Morrison
- Mark Moseley
- Randy Moss
- Eric Moulds
- Deiontrez Mount
- Ryan Mouton
- Bob Mrosko
- Matthew Mulligan
- Kalel Mullings
- Eric Mullins
- Mike Munchak
- Daniel Munyer
- Larrell Murchison
- Guy Murdock
- Caleb Murphy
- Mike Murphy
- Sean Murphy-Bunting
- DeMarco Murray
- Justin Murray
- Kenneth Murray
- Spain Musgrove
- Bobby Myers

== N ==
- Terna Nande
- Bob Naponic
- Brayden Narveson
- Damien Nash
- Brian Natkin
- Lorenzo Neal
- Joe Nedney
- Kenny Neil
- Benny Nelson
- Ron Nery
- Marshall Newhouse
- Xavier Newman-Johnson
- Tony Newsom
- Donnie Nickey
- Gifford Nielsen
- Kent Nix
- Erik Norgard
- Jim Norton
- Jeremy Nunley

== O ==
- Antwan Odom
- Sammy Joe Odom
- Neil O'Donnell
- Thomas Odukoya
- Michael Oher
- John Ojukwu
- Chig Okonkwo
- Sam Okuayinonu
- Oluwafemi Oladejo
- Dave Olerich
- Bryce Oliver
- Hubie Oliver
- Eric Olsen
- Benji Olson
- Larry Onesti
- Brian Orakpo
- Bo Orlando
- Kareem Orr
- Bob Otto
- Mike Otto
- Wes Ours
- Matt Overton
- Gervarrius Owens
- Joe Owens

== P ==
- Jordan Palmer
- Nate Palmer
- Kevin Pamphile
- Juqua Parker
- Willie Parker
- Cody Parkey
- Billy Parks
- Dave Parks
- Jeff Parks
- Bernie Parrish
- Cliff Parsley
- Dan Pastorini
- Austin Pasztor
- Jarrett Payton
- Johnny Peacock
- Alvin Pearman
- Brent Pease
- Jayden Peevy
- Willis Peguese
- Kyle Peko
- Micah Pellerin
- Jay Pennison
- Willis Perkins
- Phil Perlo
- Senorise Perry
- Vernon Perry
- Brett Petersmark
- Adrian Peterson
- Nicholas Petit-Frere
- Jamie Petrowski
- Mitch Petrus
- Barry Pettyjohn
- Perry Phenix
- Kyle Philips
- Shaun Phillips
- Wes Phillips
- Carl Pickens
- Evan Pilgrim
- Zach Piller
- Allen Pinkett
- Ropati Pitoitua
- Hugh Pitts
- Bernard Pollard
- Tony Pollard
- Bob Poole
- Larry Poole
- Tyrone Poole
- Daryl Porter
- Marico Portis
- Dickie Post
- Jeremiah Poutasi
- Michael Preston
- Roell Preston
- Isaiah Prince
- Ron Pritchard
- James Proche
- MyCole Pruitt

== Q ==
- Jeff Queen
- David Quessenberry
- Steve Quinn

== R ==
- Kevin Rader
- Dillon Radunz
- Marcus Randall
- Tom Randall
- Tate Randle
- C.J. Ravenell
- Wyatt Ray
- Kalif Raymond
- John Reaves
- Alvin Reed
- Brooks Reed
- Jerrick Reed
- Kalan Reed
- Leo Reed
- Otis Reese
- Tom Regner
- Caraun Reid
- Jim Reid
- John Reid
- George Reihner
- Mike Reinfeldt
- Mike Renfro
- Xavier Restrepo
- Darius Reynaud
- Josh Reynolds
- Robert Reynolds
- Jerry Rhome
- Andy Rice
- Floyd Rice
- George Rice
- Monty Rice
- Bucky Richardson
- Mike Richardson)
- Rico Richardson
- Calvin Ridley
- Charlie Rieves
- Cody Riggs
- Avon Riley
- Curtis Riley
- Javon Ringer
- James Ritchey
- Carl Roaches
- Michael Roan
- Derick Roberson
- James Roberson
- Guy Roberts
- Tim Roberts
- Bob Robertson
- Marcus Robertson
- Eddie Robinson
- Micah Robinson
- Paul Robinson
- Rafael Robinson
- Courtney Roby
- Reggie Roby
- Willie Rodgers
- Chester Rogers
- Samari Rolle
- Jim Romano
- Jordan Roos
- Michael Roos
- Tim Rossovich
- Mike Rozier
- Conrad Rucker
- Council Rudolph
- Mason Rudolph
- Jon Runyan
- Andrew Rupcich
- Anthony Rush
- Marion Rushing
- Derek Russell
- Barrett Ruud
- Logan Ryan

== S ==
- Rodger Saffold
- Joe Salave'a
- Harvey Salem
- Ty Sambrailo
- Greg Sampson
- Chris Sanders
- Scott Sanderson
- Justin Sandy
- Bishop Sankey
- Cairo Santos
- Ryan Santoso
- Mekhi Sargent
- Ron Saul
- Josh Savage
- John Sawyer
- Bo Scaife
- Rich Scanlon
- Jake Schifino
- Shann Schillinger
- Bob Schmidt
- Bo Schobel
- Joe Schobert
- Nick Schommer
- John Schuhmacher
- Lance Schulters
- Brian Schwenke
- DeQuincy Scott
- Jake Scott
- Ed Scrutchins
- Eugene Seale
- Da'Norris Searcy
- Coty Sensabaugh
- Jeff Severson
- Tajae Sharpe
- Tim Shaw
- Kendall Sheffield
- Malcolm Sheppard
- Visanthe Shiancoe
- George Shirkey
- Caleb Shudak
- Dainon Sidney
- John Simerson
- Jeffery Simmons
- Chris Simms
- Corey Simon
- John Simon (born 1978)
- John Simon (born 1990)
- Dave Simonson
- LeShaun Sims
- Peter Sirmon
- Daryle Skaugstad
- Tuzar Skipper
- Peter Skoronski
- Buster Skrine
- Jackson Slater
- Webster Slaughter
- Leroy Sledge
- Sam Sloman
- Joey Slye
- Donovan Small
- O.J. Small
- Tom Smiley
- Al Smith
- Andre Smith
- Anthony Smith
- Antowain Smith
- Bob Smith
- Bubba Smith
- Dave Smith (born 1937)
- Dave Smith (born May 18, 1947)
- D'Joun Smith
- Doug Smith
- Jonnu Smith
- Larry Smith
- Robaire Smith
- Rod Smith
- Rusty Smith
- Shaun Smith
- Sid Smith
- Tim Smith
- Tody Smith
- Tye Smith
- L'Jarius Sneed
- Brian Sochia
- Scott Solomon
- Rich Sowells
- Quinton Spain
- Anthony Spears
- Tyjae Spears
- Julian Spence
- Sean Spence
- Chris Spencer
- Cody Spencer
- Jack Spikes
- Robert Spillane
- Ken Stabler
- Daimion Stafford
- Dennis Stallings
- Taylor Stallworth
- Josh Stamer
- Justin Staples
- Randy Starks
- Al Steinfeld
- Dean Steinkuhler
- Greg Stemrick
- Mike Stensrud
- Mark Stepnoski
- Craig Stevens
- David Stewart
- Rayna Stewart
- Byron Stingily
- Aaron Stinnie
- Carel Stith
- Luke Stocker
- Terry Stoepel
- Donnie Stone
- Ryan Stonehouse
- Rich Stotter
- Art Strahan
- Art Stringer
- Kevin Strong
- Vince Stroth
- Mark Studaway
- Les Studdard
- Jerry Sturm
- Ryan Succop
- Bob Suci
- Walter Suggs
- Kent Sullivan
- Steve Superick
- Phillip Supernaw
- Mickey Sutton
- Mike Sutton
- Will Svitek
- Geoff Swaim
- Richard Swatland
- T'Vondre Sweat

== T ==
- Bob Talamini
- Ryan Tannehill
- Alex Tanney
- Teair Tart
- Steve Tasker
- Jack Tatum
- J. R. Tavai
- Altie Taylor
- Lionel Taylor
- Malcolm Taylor
- Taywan Taylor
- Mike Teeter
- Yancey Thigpen
- Bill Thomas
- Dee Thomas
- Earl Thomas
- Jemea Thomas
- Rodney Thomas
- Sloan Thomas
- Stan Thomas
- Rich Thomaselli
- Emmuel Thompson
- Josh Thompson
- Lamont Thompson
- Taylor Thompson
- Ted Thompson
- David Thornton
- James Thornton
- John Thornton
- Calvin Throckmorton
- Andrae Thurman
- Byron Thweatt
- Mike Tilleman
- Spencer Tillman
- Bill Tobin
- Charlie Tolar
- Jim Tolbert
- Billy Joe Tolliver
- Spencer Toone
- Morris Towns
- Johnny Townsend
- Allen Trammel
- Orville Trask
- Brynden Trawick
- Sebastian Tretola
- Ben Troupe
- Don Trull
- Natu Tuatagaloa
- Willie Tullis
- Stephen Tulloch
- Cole Turner
- Dwaine Turner
- Rob Turner
- Robert Turner
- Andrew Turzilli
- Derrek Tuszka
- Shy Tuttle

== U ==
- Oli Udoh
- Olen Underwood
- Brent Urban

== V ==
- Kenny Vaccaro
- Ira Valentine
- Kyle Vanden Bosch
- Nick Vannett
- Vernon Vanoy
- Demetrin Veal
- Craig Veasey
- Fernando Velasco
- Chris Verhulst
- Alterraun Verner
- Kevin Vickerson
- Kindle Vildor
- Theophile Viltz
- Paul Vogel
- Mike Voight
- Billy Volek

== W ==
- Michael Waddell
- Bobby Wade
- Loyd Wainscott
- Cameron Wake
- Erik Walden
- Delanie Walker
- DeMarcus Walker
- Denard Walker
- Gary Walker
- Joe Walker
- Wayne Walker
- Aaron Wallace Jr.
- Cooper Wallace
- K'Von Wallace
- Ray Wallace
- Fred Wallner
- Garret Wallow
- Herkie Walls
- Ward Walsh
- Joey Walters
- Sam Walton
- Seth Wand
- Cam Ward
- Jihad Ward
- Jonathan Ward
- Chance Warmack
- Leon Washington
- Nate Washington
- Ted Washington, Sr.
- Vic Washington
- Carlos Watkins
- Ed Watson
- Leroy Watson
- Rashad Weaver
- B. W. Webb
- George Webster
- Eric Weems
- Bucky Wegener
- Mike Weger
- Sammy Weir
- Gary Wellman
- Ray Wells
- Terry Wells
- Trevon Wesco
- Terrance West
- Nick Westbrook-Ikhine
- Hogan Wharton
- Bob White
- Bucky White
- Jim White
- John White
- Kyzir White
- LenDale White
- Lorenzo White
- Charlie Whitehurst
- C. L. Whittington
- Josh Whyle
- Doug Wilkerson
- Jordan Wilkins
- Armon Williams
- Cary Williams
- Damian Williams
- David Williams
- Doug Williams
- James Williams
- Jamie Williams
- Lee Williams
- Maxie Williams
- Mike Williams
- Nick Williams
- Oliver Williams
- Paul Williams
- Ralph Williams
- Richard Williams
- Roydell Williams
- Sam Williams
- Sylvester Williams
- Tank Williams
- Todd Williams
- Avery Williamson
- Fred Willis
- Malik Willis
- George Wilson
- Isaiah Wilson
- J. C. Wilson
- Sheddrick Wilson
- Tim Wilson
- Tracy Wilson
- Kamerion Wimbley
- Jamie Winborn
- Kevin Winston Jr.
- Gary Wisener
- Al Witcher
- Will Witherspoon
- John Wittenborn
- Samuel Womack
- Julius Wood
- Al Woods
- Antwaun Woods
- Glenn Woods
- LeVar Woods
- Robert Woods (born 1955)
- Robert Woods (born 1992)
- Xavier Woods
- Logan Woodside
- Wesley Woodyard
- Andre Woolfolk
- Butch Woolfolk
- Khalid Wooten
- Daryl Worley
- Barron Wortham
- Blidi Wreh-Wilson
- Elmo Wright
- Kendall Wright
- Matthew Wright
- Alvin Wyatt
- Frank Wycheck
- Devon Wylie
- Jarius Wynn

== Y ==
- Bashir Yamini
- George Yarno
- James Yeats
- Almon Young
- Bob Young
- James Young
- Robert Young
- Vince Young

== Z ==
- Paul Zaeske
- Kevin Zeitler
- Tony Zendejas
- Ty Zentner
