= 1987 Houston Oilers season =

NFL team season

- Owner: Bud Adams
- General manager: Ladd Herzeg
- Head coach: Jerry Glanville
- Offensive coordinator: Dick Jamieson
- Home stadium: Houston Astrodome

Results
- Record: 9–6
- Division place: 2nd AFC Central
- Playoffs: Won Wild Card Playoffs (vs. Seahawks) 23–20 (OT); Lost Divisional Playoffs (at Broncos) 10–34

Uniform
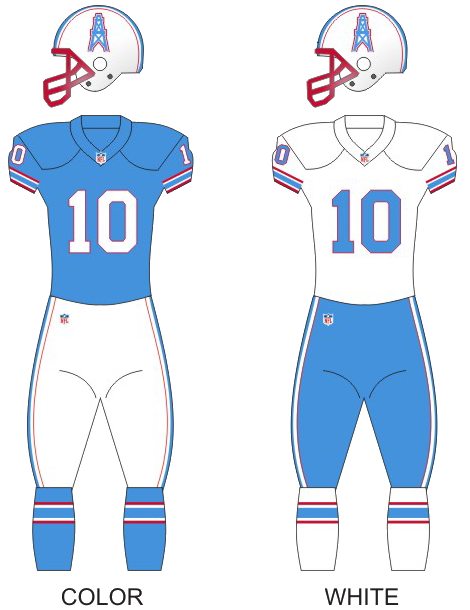

The 1987 Houston Oilers season was the franchise's 18th season in the National Football League and the 28th overall. The Oilers came into the season looking to improve on their 5–11 record from 1986, and make the playoffs for the first time since 1980; the team did precisely that, improving sharply from the previous season in a 15-game season in which replacement players were used in weeks 4-6 as a result of a players' strike, which wiped out week 3 of the season, finishing 9-6.

== Season summary ==
The 1987 NFL season was affected by a players strike that took place in week 3 of the season, which canceled all week 3 games. As a result, the Oilers canceled there was-to-be week 3 game against the Los Angeles Raiders. The Oilers began the season 3–1, their best start to a season since 1980. After the Oilers lost at home to the Patriots 21–7 in week 5, the Oilers defeated the Atlanta Falcons and Cincinnati Bengals to give them a 5–2 start to the season. After the Oilers lost to the 49ers on the road, they beat the Pittsburgh Steelers on the road, 23–3, for their first win in Pittsburgh since 1978. The Oilers would then play 2 disastrous games against the Browns and the Colts, as they allowed 40+ points in each game, losing 40–7 to Cleveland at home and losing 51–27 to the Colts in Indianapolis. The Oilers would defeat the Chargers the next week, rebounding from those 2 bad losses. The Oilers would clinch a playoff spot in the season's final week with a 21–17 win over Cincinnati, thus ending their 6-year playoff drought. This was the first of seven consecutive playoff appearances for the Oilers. In the playoffs, they defeated the Seattle Seahawks 23–20 in overtime on a Tony Zendejas field goal. However, the next week, they lost to the Broncos 34–10 in the Divisional Round, ending their season.

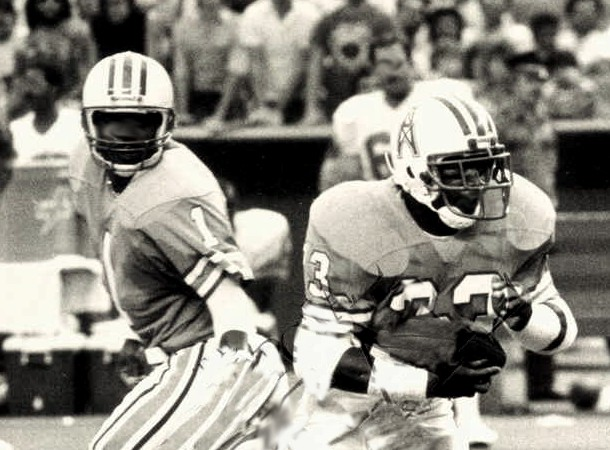
Warren Moon (left) and Mike Rozier (right), playing for the Oilers in 1987, led the team in passing and rushing that season, respectively.

== Offseason ==
=== NFL draft ===
1987 Houston Oilers draft
Round	Pick	Player	Position	College	Notes
1	3	Alonzo Highsmith	Running back	Miami (FL)	
1	20	Haywood Jeffires *	Wide receiver	North Carolina State	
2	46	Walter Johnson	Linebacker	Louisiana Tech	
3	64	Cody Carlson	Quarterback	Baylor	
4	105	Mark Dusbabek	Linebacker	Minnesota	
5	133	Spencer Tillman	Running back	Oklahoma	
6	147	Al Smith *	Linebacker	Utah State	
6	159	Toby Caston	Linebacker	LSU	
7	176	Robert Banks	Defensive end	Notre Dame	
8	202	Michel James	Wide receiver	Washington State	
9	231	Wes Neighbors	Center	Alabama	
10	258	Curtis Duncan *	Wide receiver	Northwestern	
11	287	John Davis	Offensive tackle	Georgia Tech	
12	314	Ira Valentine	Running back	Texas A&M	
Made roster * Made at least one Pro Bowl during career

== Personnel ==
=== Staff ===
1987 Houston Oilers staff
Front office: Owner/Chairman of the Board/President – Bud Adams; Executive Vice President/General Manager – Ladd Herzeg; Head coaches: Head Coach – Jerry Glanville; Offensive coaches: Quarterbacks – June Jones; Running Backs – Dick Jamieson; Receivers – Milt Jackson; Tight Ends – Miller McCalmon; Offensive Line – Kim Helton	Defensive coaches: Defensive Line – Doug Shively; Linebackers – Floyd Reese; Secondary – Tom Bettis; Special teams coaches: Special Teams – Miller McCalmon; Strength and conditioning: Strength and Rehabilitation – Steve Watterson

=== Roster ===
1987 Houston Oilers roster
Quarterbacks (QB): 14 Cody Carlson; 10 Brent Pease; 1 Warren Moon; Running backs (RB): 32 Alonzo Highsmith FB; 20 Allen Pinkett KR; 30 Mike Rozier; 33 Spencer Tillman; 45 Ira Valentine; 35 Ray Wallace FB; Wide receivers (WR): 82 Willie Drewrey; 80 Curtis Duncan; 81 Ernest Givins; 85 Drew Hill; 84 Haywood Jeffires; Tight ends (TE): 89 Jeff Parks; 87 Jamie Williams	Offensive linemen (OL): 77 Bruce Davis T; 72 Kent Hill G; 50 Billy Kidd C; 78 Don Maggs G/T; 74 Bruce Matthews G; 63 Mike Munchak G; 52 Jay Pennison C; 70 Dean Steinkuhler T; 69 Doug Williams T; Defensive linemen (DL): 75 Jesse Baker DE; 71 Richard Byrd DE; 79 Ray Childress DE; 98 Rayford Cooks DE; 95 William Fuller DE; 94 Charles Martin NT; 99 Doug Smith NT	Linebackers (LB): 51 Eric Fairs OLB; 59 John Grimsley ILB; 57 Walter Johnson ILB; 93 Robert Lyles OLB; 91 Johnny Meads OLB; 53 Eugene Seale ILB; 54 Al Smith ILB; Defensive backs (DB): 29 Patrick Allen CB; 25 Keith Bostic SS; 24 Steve Brown CB; 23 Domingo Bryant SS; 31 Jeff Donaldson SS; 21 Bo Eason FS; 22 Kenny Johnson FS; 26 Audray McMillian CB; Special teams (ST): 8 Jeff Gossett P; 7 Tony Zendejas K	Practice squad: None - N/A; Reserve: 56 Robert Abraham LB (IR); 97 Robert Banks DE (IR); -- Craig Birdsong S (IR); 90 Toby Caston LB (IR); -- Charles Clinton CB (IR); 73 John Davis T (IR); -- Neal Dellocono LB (IR); -- Mark Dusbabek LB (IR); -- Tony Fitzpatrick NT (IR); -- Leonard Harris WR (IR); -- Arkkie James TE (IR); 23 Richard Johnson CB (IR); 28 Allen Lyday S (IR); -- Keith McDonald WR (IR); 68 Vince Stroth G (IR); -- Bucky White CB (IR); Rookies in italics 49 active, 14 reserve, 0 practice squad

=== NFL replacement players ===
After the league decided to use replacement players during the NFLPA strike, the following team was assembled:

1987 Houston Oilers replacement roster
Quarterbacks: 10 David Worsham; 11 Robbie Robbins; 12 John Witkowski; Running backs: 30 Herman Hunter; 32 Ricky Moore; 33 Don Williams; 35 Eric Cobble; 36 Jarvis McKyer; 38 Lionel Wilson; 40 Andrew Jackson; Wide receivers: 15 Roger Coleman; 80 Leonard Harris; 81 Keith McDonald; 82 Sam Moore; 83 Joey Walters; 84 Haywood Jeffires; 84 Robert Mitchell; 85 Chris Darrington; 86 Oliver Williams; Tight ends: 87 Scott Eccles; 88 Mark Gehring; 89 James Arrike	Offensive linemen: 50 Billy Kidd; 60 Jerrell Franklin; 62 Doug Kellermeyer; 66 Clay Miller; 69 Brett Petersmark; 70 Charles Agee; 73 Almon Young; 76 Louis Garza; 77 Scott Boucher; 77 Barry Pettyjohn; 78 Roland Aumueller; Defensive linemen: 71 Gerald Browner; 75 Jesse Baker; 75 Kenny Neil; 94 Eric Larkin; 94 Charles Martin; 95 Dwain Turner; 98 Rayford Cooks; 99 Rickey Hagood; 99 Doug Smith	Linebackers: 50 Paul Vogel; 51 Eugene Seale; 53 Thad Jefferson; 54 Larry Smith; 55 Scott Stoughton; 56 George Woods; 57 Bryon Johnson; 59 Scott Fox; Defensive backs: 20 Earl Allen; 21 Craig Birdsong; 22 Kenneth Johnson; 23 Domingo Bryant; 24 Clinton Charles; 25 Larry Joyner; 26 Tony Newsom; 27 Donovan Small; 28 Emmuel Thompson; 29 Robert White; 31 Darrell Francis; 37 Ken McKyer; Special teams: 4 Florian Kempf K; 7 Tony Zendejas K; 8 Steve Superick P; 9 John Diettrich K; 11 Lee Johnson P

== Regular season ==
=== Schedule ===
Week	Date	Opponent	Result	Record	Venue	Attendance
1	September 13	Los Angeles Rams	**W** 20–16	1–0	Astrodome	33,186
2	September 20	at Buffalo Bills	**L** 30–34	1–1	Rich Stadium	56,534
–	September 27	Los Angeles Raiders	canceled	1–1	Astrodome	–
3	October 4	at Denver Broncos	**W** 40–10	2–1	Mile High Stadium	38,494
4	October 11	at **Cleveland Browns**	**W** 15–10	3–1	Cleveland Municipal Stadium	38,927
5	October 18	New England Patriots	**L** 7–21	3–2	Astrodome	26,294
6	October 25	Atlanta Falcons	**W** 37–33	4–2	Astrodome	29,062
7	November 1	at **Cincinnati Bengals**	**W** 31–29	5–2	Riverfront Stadium	52,700
8	November 8	at San Francisco 49ers	**L** 20–27	5–3	Candlestick Park	59,740
9	November 15	at **Pittsburgh Steelers**	**W** 23–3	6–3	Three Rivers Stadium	56,177
10	November 22	**Cleveland Browns**	**L** 7–40	6–4	Astrodome	51,161
11	November 29	at Indianapolis Colts	**L** 27–51	6–5	Hoosier Dome	54,999
12	December 6	San Diego Chargers	**W** 33–18	7–5	Astrodome	31,714
13	December 13	at New Orleans Saints	**L** 10–24	7–6	Louisiana Superdome	68,257
14	December 20	**Pittsburgh Steelers**	**W** 24–16	8–6	Astrodome	38,683
15	December 27	**Cincinnati Bengals**	**W** 21–17	9–6	Astrodome	49,775
Note: Intra-division opponents are in **bold** text.

=== Game summaries ===
==== Week 7 ====
Team	1	2	3	4	Total
Falcons	3	10	14	6	33
• Oilers	3	10	7	17	37

- Date: October 25
- Location: Houston Astrodome
- Game start: 1:00 p.m. EST
- Game weather: Indoors (dome)
- Referee: Fred Silva

Scoring summary
Q1	ATL	Luckhurst 39 yard field goal	ATL 3–0
Q1	HOU	Zendejas 31 yard field goal	Tie 3−3
Q2	ATL	Luckhurst 37 yard field goal	ATL 6–3
Q2	HOU	Zendejas 43 yard field goal	Tie 6–6
Q2	ATL	Dixon 10 yard pass from Campbell (Luckhurst kick)	ATL 13−6
Q2	HOU	Duncan 41 yard pass from Moon (Zendejas kick)	Tie 13−13
Q3	HOU	Givins 8 yard pass from Moon (Zendejas kick)	HOU 20–13
Q3	ATL	Bailey 29 yard pass from Campbell (Luckhurst kick)	Tie 20–20
Q3	ATL	Whisenhunt 3 yard pass from Campbell (Luckhurst kick)	ATL 27−20
Q4	HOU	Rozier 14 yard run (Zendejas kick)	Tie 27–27
Q4	HOU	Zendejas 24 yard field goal	HOU 30–27
Q4	ATL	Luckhurst 45 yard field goal	Tie 30–30
Q4	ATL	Luckhurst 18 yard field goal	ATL 33–30
Q4	HOU	Duncan 14 yard pass from Moon (Zendejas kick)	HOU 37–33

=== Standings ===
AFC Central
	W	L	T	PCT	DIV	CONF	PF	PA	STK
^{(2)} Cleveland Browns	10	5	0	.667	5–1	8–3	390	239	W3
^{(4)} Houston Oilers	9	6	0	.600	5–1	7–4	345	349	W2
Pittsburgh Steelers	8	7	0	.533	2–4	6–5	285	299	L2
Cincinnati Bengals	4	11	0	.267	0–6	3–9	285	370	L3

== Playoffs ==
=== AFC Wild Card ===
Houston Oilers 23, Seattle Seahawks 20 (OT)

Quarter	1	2	3	4	OT	Total
Seahawks	7	3	3	7	0	20
Oilers	3	10	7	0	3	23

at Astrodome, Houston, Texas

- Game time: 4:00 p.m. EST/3:00 p.m. CST
- Game attendance: 50,519
- Referee: Bob McElwee
- TV announcers (NBC): Marv Albert and Joe Namath

Oilers kicker Tony Zendejas won the game with a 42-yard field goal 8:05 into overtime. Although Houston outgained Seattle with 427 total offensive yards to 250, the game remained close until the very end.

=== AFC Divisional Playoff ===
Denver Broncos 34, Houston Oilers 10

Quarter	1	2	3	4	Total
Oilers	0	3	0	7	10
Broncos	14	10	3	7	34

at Mile High Stadium, Denver, Colorado

- Game time: 4:00 p.m. EST/2:00 p.m. MST
- Game weather: 28 °F or −2.2 °C, relative humidity 55%, wind 9 miles per hour (14 km/h; 7.8 kn), wind chill 19 °F or −7.2 °C
- Game attendance: 75,440
- Referee: Jerry Markbreit
- TV announcers (NBC): Dick Enberg and Merlin Olsen

== Awards and records ==
- Keith Bostic, NFL Leader, Interceptions, (6) – Tied with two others for league lead
