= 1994 Houston Oilers season =

35th season in franchise history

- Owner: Bud Adams
- General manager: Floyd Reese
- Head coach: Jack Pardee (fired on November 14, 1-9 record); Jeff Fisher (interim; 1-5 record)
- Offensive coordinator: Kevin Gilbride
- Defensive coordinator: Jeff Fisher
- Home stadium: Houston Astrodome

Results
- Record: 2–14
- Division place: 4th AFC Central
- Playoffs: Did not qualify
- Pro Bowlers: C Bruce Matthews; CB Darryll Lewis

Uniform
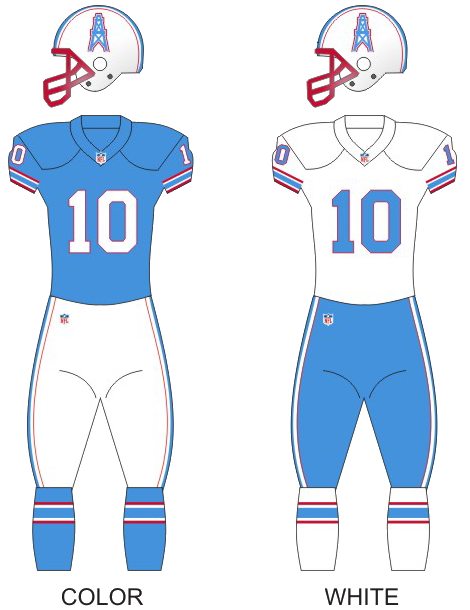

The 1994 Houston Oilers season was the 35th season overall the Oilers played and their 25th with the National Football League (NFL), and was part of the 1994 NFL season. The Oilers missed the playoffs for the first time since 1986.

Two notable losses the Oilers suffered were the trading of Warren Moon, the team’s longtime starting quarterback, to the Minnesota Vikings and the departure of defensive coordinator Buddy Ryan, who was hired to coach the Arizona Cardinals. With Moon being replaced by career backup Cody Carlson and the defense left without its leader, the 1994 Oilers went into a tailspin despite returning several of their explosive offensive players such as Ernest Givins and Haywood Jeffires. The team started out with only one win in their first ten games, which led to head coach Jack Pardee and offensive coordinator Kevin Gilbride being fired. Jeff Fisher, who had just joined the team that year as Ryan's replacement as defensive coordinator, was promoted to head coach.

Carlson did not last the season as he suffered a series of injuries that proved to be career ending. Billy Joe Tolliver ended up making the most starts of any Oilers quarterback, losing all seven of his starts. Neither Tolliver, Carlson, or third quarterback Bucky Richardson threw for more than six touchdowns (Carlson only managed one in five starts) and Tolliver and Carlson threw more interceptions than touchdowns. Running back Gary Brown could not repeat his 1,000-yard total from the previous year, managing only 648. Givins, who had recorded nearly 900 receiving yards in 1993, fell to 521 in 1994 while seeing his receptions total drop to 35. Jeffires' numbers improved slightly, and he led the Oilers in receiving touchdowns with six, but he was not elected to the Pro Bowl as he had been in 1993. Slaughter, meanwhile, only caught two touchdowns, which was his lowest total to that point in his career. The offense finished last in the league in points scored and 26th in total yardage.

The defense, which lost several of its key pieces from the previous season including its two leaders in sacks, also fell off. After giving up the fourth-lowest point total in 1993, the Oilers allowed a total of 352 points in 1994. Despite that, three players recorded at least six sacks with Lamar Lathon leading with 8.5. Darryll Lewis recorded five interceptions in his first full season as a starter, with fellow cornerback Cris Dishman getting four and returning one for a touchdown, and safety Marcus Robertson adding three of his own. The defense also managed to improve on their total yardage allowed from 1993, moving up from ninth in that category despite finishing near the bottom of the league in points allowed.

When the season was over the Oilers stood at 2–14, tying their 1983 squad with the team’s fewest wins in a sixteen game season and the second-fewest overall, with the 1972, 1973, 1982 squads only winning once each season. The ten-game swing is the worst season-to-season drop in games won in NFL history, which would later be tied by the 2013 Houston Texans. Seven of their fourteen losses came by three points or fewer.

Although the Oilers finished with the worst record that season, they did not receive the #1 pick in the 1995 NFL draft due to the entry of the expansion Carolina Panthers and Jacksonville Jaguars into the league (under NFL rules, a new team is automatically granted the first pick in their first draft, unless they decide to give it up as the Panthers would do). However, the news was not all negative. With the high pick the Oilers chose Steve McNair, who would go on to become one of the franchise’s all-time great players.

== Offseason ==
After having imploded in the playoffs against Kansas City in the 1993 playoffs, the Oilers traded longtime quarterback Warren Moon to Minnesota, leaving Cody Carlson as the starter for the 1994 season. Carlson, however, was severely injured early in the season and would eventually retire due to said injuries after the season.

=== NFL draft ===
1994 Houston Oilers draft
Round	Pick	Player	Position	College	Notes
1	26	Henry Ford	Defensive tackle	Arkansas	
2	60	Jeremy Nunley	Defensive end	Alabama	
3	101	Malcolm Floyd	Wide receiver	Fresno State	
4	119	Mike Davis	Cornerback	Cincinnati	
4	129	Sean Jackson	Running back	Florida State	
5	157	Roderick Lewis	Tight end	Arizona	
5	161	Jim Reid	Offensive tackle	Virginia	
6	187	Lee Gissendaner	Wide receiver	Northwestern	
6	194	Barron Wortham	Linebacker	UTEP	
7	220	Lemanski Hall	Linebacker	Alabama	
Made roster

== Personnel ==
=== Staff ===
1994 Houston Oilers staff
Front office: Owner/chairman of the board/president – Bud Adams; Executive vice-president/general manager – Floyd Reese; Vice-president of player personnel and scouting – Mike Holovak; Head coaches: Head coach – Jack Pardee; Assistant head coach/offense – Kevin Gilbride; Offensive coaches: Offensive coordinator – Dick Coury; Running backs – Frank Novak; Receivers – Charlie Baggett; Offensive line – Bob Young	Defensive coaches: Defensive coordinator – Jeff Fisher; Defensive line – Jim Stanley; Linebackers – Gregg Williams; Defensive backs – Tom Bettis; Quality control – Frank Bush; Special teams coaches: Special teams – Frank Novak; Strength and conditioning: Strength and Rehabilitation – Steve Watterson

=== Roster ===
1994 Houston Oilers roster
Quarterbacks (QB): 14 Cody Carlson; 7 Bucky Richardson; 11 Billy Joe Tolliver; 10 Lee Williamson; Running backs (RB): 33 Gary Brown; 47 Le'Shai Maston FB; 37 Todd McNair; 32 Spencer Tillman; 44 Lorenzo White; Wide receivers (WR): 87 Pat Coleman; 83 Malcolm Seabron; 81 Ernest Givins; 82 Travis Hannah; 80 Haywood Jeffires; 84 Webster Slaughter; 88 Gary Wellman; Tight ends (TE): 85 Pat Carter; 49 Roderick Lewis; 48 John Henry Mills	Offensive linemen (OL): 77 Kevin Donnalley G; 55 John Flannery G; 72 Brad Hopkins T; 74 Bruce Matthews C; 64 Erik Norgard G; 67 Jim Reid T; 75 Bill Schultz G; 70 Stan Thomas T; 73 David Williams T; Defensive linemen (DL): 79 Ray Childress DT; 90 Kenny Davidson DE; 92 Henry Ford DE; 57 Lamar Lathon DE; 94 Glenn Montgomery DT; 93 Jeremy Nunley DE; 68 Tim Roberts DT	Linebackers (LB): 56 Micheal Barrow OLB; 59 Joe Bowden OLB; 53 Brett Faryniarz OLB; 51 Lemanski Hall OLB; 50 Eddie Robinson OLB; 54 Al Smith MLB; 52 Barron Wortham MLB; Defensive backs (DB): 22 Tomur Barnes CB; 23 Blaine Bishop SS; 30 Mike Davis CB; 28 Cris Dishman CB; 24 Steve Jackson CB; 29 Darryll Lewis CB; 25 Bubba McDowell SS; 26 Bo Orlando FS; 31 Marcus Robertson FS; Special teams (ST): 16 Rich Camarillo P; 3 Al Del Greco K	Practice squad: 86 Mario Bailey WR; 98 Willie Jennings DT; Reserve: 89 Reggie Brown WR (IR); 41 Sean Jackson RB (IR); 71 Mike Teeter DE (IR); 53 active, 3 inactive, 2 practice squad Rookies in italics

== Regular season ==
=== Schedule ===
Week	Date	Opponent	Result	Record	Venue	Recap
1	September 4	at Indianapolis Colts	**L** 21–45	0–1	RCA Dome	Recap
2	September 11	at Dallas Cowboys	**L** 17–20	0–2	Texas Stadium	Recap
3	September 18	Buffalo Bills	**L** 7–15	0–3	Astrodome	Recap
4	September 25	**Cincinnati Bengals**	**W** 20–13	1–3	Astrodome	Recap
5	October 3	at **Pittsburgh Steelers**	**L** 14–30	1–4	Three Rivers Stadium	Recap
6	Bye					
7	October 13	**Cleveland Browns**	**L** 8–11	1–5	Astrodome	Recap
8	October 24	at Philadelphia Eagles	**L** 6–21	1–6	Veterans Stadium	Recap
9	October 30	at Los Angeles Raiders	**L** 14–17	1–7	Los Angeles Memorial Coliseum	Recap
10	November 6	**Pittsburgh Steelers**	**L** 9–12 (OT)	1–8	Astrodome	Recap
11	November 13	at **Cincinnati Bengals**	**L** 31–34	1–9	Riverfront Stadium	Recap
12	November 21	New York Giants	**L** 10–13	1–10	Astrodome	Recap
13	November 27	at **Cleveland Browns**	**L** 10–34	1–11	Cleveland Stadium	Recap
14	December 4	Arizona Cardinals	**L** 12–30	1–12	Astrodome	Recap
15	December 11	Seattle Seahawks	**L** 14–16	1–13	Astrodome	Recap
16	December 18	at Kansas City Chiefs	**L** 9–31	1–14	Arrowhead Stadium	Recap
17	December 24	New York Jets	**W** 24–10	2–14	Astrodome	Recap
Note: Intra-division opponents are in **bold** text.

=== Game summaries ===
==== Week 14 ====
Team	1	2	3	4	Total
• Cardinals	0	10	0	20	30
Oilers	9	3	0	0	12

- Date: December 4
- Location: Astrodome, Houston, Texas
- Game start: 3:00 p.m. CST
- Game attendance: 39,821
- Game weather: played indoors, domed stadium
- Referee: Red Cashion
- Television network: Fox

Scoring summary
Q1	9:33	HOU	Safety, Lamar Lathon tackled Jay Schroeder in end zone	HOU 2–0
Q1	11:50	HOU	Cris Dishman 36 yard interception return (Al Del Greco kick)	HOU 9–0
Q2	2:59	ARI	Larry Centers 1 yard rush (Greg Davis kick)	HOU 9–7
Q2	10:45	ARI	Greg Davis 25 yard field goal	ARI 10–9
Q2	13:42	HOU	Al Del Greco 34 yard field goal	HOU 12–10
Q4	2:57	ARI	Gary Clark 13 yard pass from Jay Schroeder (Ronald Moore run)	ARI 18–12
Q4		ARI	Greg Davis 23 yard field goal	ARI 21–12
Q4		ARI	Larry Centers 4 yard rush (Greg Davis kick)	ARI 28–12
Q4		ARI	Safety, Eric Swann tackled Billy Joe Tolliver in end zone	ARI 30–12

This ninth successive defeat for the Oilers has the unusual distinction of being the most recent NFL game as of 2019 during which both teams scored a safety, and one of only eight since at least 1940.

=== Standings ===
AFC Central
	W	L	T	PCT	PF	PA	STK
^{(1)} Pittsburgh Steelers	12	4	0	.750	316	234	L1
^{(4)} Cleveland Browns	11	5	0	.688	340	204	W1
Cincinnati Bengals	3	13	0	.188	276	406	W1
Houston Oilers	2	14	0	.125	226	352	W1
