= 1987 Cleveland Browns season =

NFL team season

- Owner: Art Modell
- General manager: Ernie Accorsi
- Head coach: Marty Schottenheimer
- Offensive coordinator: Lindy Infante
- Defensive coordinator: Dave Adolph
- Home stadium: Cleveland Municipal Stadium

Results
- Record: 10–5
- Division place: 1st AFC Central
- Playoffs: Won Divisional Playoffs (vs. Colts) 38–21; Lost AFC Championship (at Broncos) 33–38
- Pro Bowlers: T Cody Risien; QB Bernie Kosar; FB Kevin Mack; NT Bob Golic; OLB Clay Matthews, Jr. CB Frank Minnifield; CB Hanford Dixon; RS Gerald McNeil

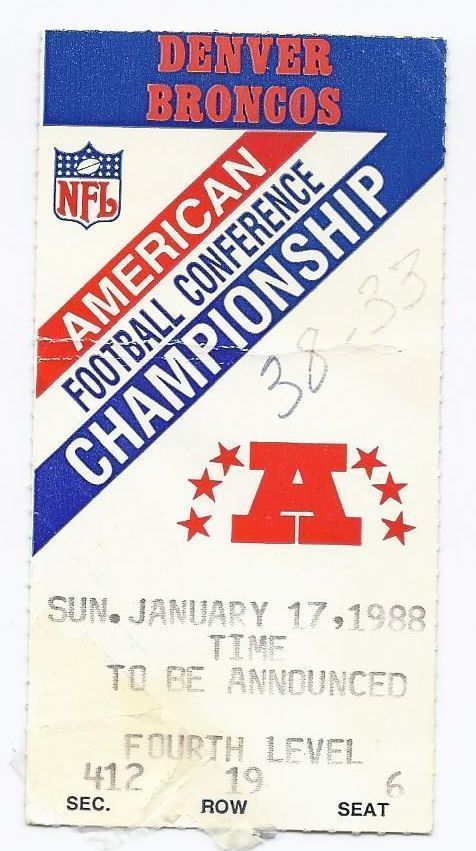
A ticket for the AFC Championship game between the Browns and the Broncos.

The 1987 Cleveland Browns season was the team's 38th season in the National Football League.

Led by another 3,000-yard season from Bernie Kosar, the Browns captured their third-straight AFC Central crown. In the divisional playoffs, against the Indianapolis Colts at Municipal Stadium, the Browns routed the Colts 38–21 to advance to their second-straight AFC Championship game. For the second year in a row, the Browns were matched up against the Denver Broncos for a trip to Super Bowl XXII. The Browns fell behind early at Mile High Stadium, as the Broncos roared out to a big halftime lead. However, the Browns scored 30 points in the second half, and drove down the field in the late fourth quarter with a chance to score a game-tying touchdown. With 1:12 left in the game, RB Earnest Byner was stripped of the ball at the 2-yard line by Broncos' defensive back Jeremiah Castille in a play since dubbed The Fumble. Denver ran down the clock and took an intentional safety with 8 seconds left, and the Browns fell 38–33. Denver returned to the Super Bowl for a second straight year at the expense of the Browns.

== Offseason ==
=== NFL draft ===
1987 Cleveland Browns draft
Round	Pick	Player	Position	College	Notes
1	5	Mike Junkin	Linebacker	Duke	from San Diego
2	32	Gregg Rakoczy	Center	Miami (FL)	from San Diego
3	80	Tim Manoa	Fullback	Penn State	
3	82	Jeff Jaeger *	Kicker	Washington	
6	165	Stephen Braggs	Defensive back	Texas	
8	220	Steve Bullitt	Linebacker	Texas A&M	
10	276	Frank Winters *	Center	Western Illinois	
11	303	Larry Brewton	Defensive back	Temple	
Made roster * Made at least one Pro Bowl during career

== Personnel ==
=== Staff ===
1987 Cleveland Browns staff
Front office: President and owner – Art Modell; Executive vice-president of football operations – Ernie Accorsi; Director of player personnel – Chip Falivene; Head coaches: Head coach – Marty Schottenheimer; Offensive coaches: Offensive coordinator/quarterbacks – Lindy Infante; Running backs – Joe Pendry; Receivers – Richard Mann; Tight ends – Charlie Davis; Offensive line – Howard Mudd	Defensive coaches: Defensive coordinator – Dave Adolph; Defensive line – Tom Pratt; Secondary – Bill Cowher; Special Assistant/Defense – Darvin Wallis; Special teams coaches: Special teams – Kurt Schottenheimer; Strength and conditioning: Strength and conditioning – Dave Redding

=== NFL replacement players ===
After the league decided to use replacement players during the NFLPA strike, the following team was assembled:

1987 Cleveland Browns replacement roster
Quarterbacks: 11 Jeff Christensen; 1 Homer Jordan; 13 Joe Pizzo; 12 Karlton Walton; Running backs: 47 Mike Crawford; 35 Stacey Driver; 39 Major Everett; 21 Corey Gilmore; 33 Kirk Jones; 48 George Landry; 42 Larry Mason; 42 Calvin Pierce; Wide receivers: 87 Clayton Beauford; 86 Terry Bell; 80 Stanley Carraway; 22 Perry Kemp; 40 Mike McDade; 28,88 Steve Pierce; 84 Keith Tinsley; 85 David Verser; 89 Louis Watson; 26 Arthur Williams; 85 Ray Williams; Tight ends: 83 Donnie Echols; 80 Chris Kelley; 81 Derek Tennell	Offensive linemen: 65 John Askin; 73 Keith Bosley; 62 Mike Katolin; 68 Barry Lee; 66 Dave Sparenberg; 50 Mike Teifke; 71 Ralph Van Dyke; 64 Blake Wingle; Defensive linemen: 94 Robert Brannon; 75 Alex Carter; 93 Scott Cooper; 98 Aaron Moog; 74 Morgan Roane; 79 Mike Rusinek; 91 Darryl Sims	Linebackers: 92 Dave Butler; 59 James Capers; 55 Tim Crawford; 52 David Grayson; 58 Cliff Hanneman; 97 Mike Kovaleski; 57 Steve Nave; 54 Jerry Parker; 53 Tom Polley; 56 Dick Teets; Defensive backs: 25 Vincent Barnett; 36 Vince Carreker; 27 Brian Dudley; -- Robert Goins; 38 Alvin Horn; 49 Steve Lauter; 20 Earnest Moore; 30 Billy Robinson; 23 DeJuan Robinson; 41 Troy Wilson; 43 Stacy Williams; Special teams: 4 Brian Franco K; 3 Goran Lingmerth K; 5 Dale Walters P

=== Roster ===
1987 Cleveland Browns roster
Quarterbacks (QB): 18 Gary Danielson; 19 Bernie Kosar; 10 Mike Pagel; Running backs (RB): 44 Earnest Byner; 28 Herman Fontenot; 34 Kevin Mack; 42 Tim Manoa; Wide receivers (WR): 86 Brian Brennan; 88 Reggie Langhorne; 89 Gerald McNeil; 84 Webster Slaughter; 85 Clarence Weathers; 83 Glen Young; Tight ends (TE): 82 Ozzie Newsome; 81 Derek Tennell	Offensive linemen (OL): 61 Mike Baab C; 74 Paul Farren T/G; 69 Dan Fike G; 65 Darryl Haley G/T; 73 Gregg Rakoczy G/C; 63 Cody Risien T; 70 Larry Williams G; Defensive linemen (DL): 60 Al Baker DE; 91 Sam Clancy DE; 79 Bob Golic NT; 78 Carl Hairston DE; 95 Marlon Jones DE; 72 Dave Puzzuoli NT; 90 Darryl Sims DE	Linebackers (LB): 56 David Grayson OLB; 53 Anthony Griggs ILB; 94 Rusty Guilbeau OLB; 51 Eddie Johnson ILB; 59 Mike Johnson ILB; 57 Clay Matthews OLB; 52 Nick Miller ILB; 50 Lucius Sanford OLB; Defensive backs (DB): 36 Stephen Braggs CB; 29 Hanford Dixon CB; 24 Ray Ellis SS; 27 Al Gross FS; 23 Mark Harper CB; 31 Frank Minnifield CB; 37 Chris Rockins SS; 22 Felix Wright FS; Special teams (ST): 9 Matt Bahr K; 8 Jeff Jaeger K; 11 Lee Johnson P; 64 Frank Winters LS	Reserve: 43 Tony Baker RB (IR); 16 Albert Bell WR (IR); 77 Rickey Bolden T (IR); 97 Steve Bullitt LB (IR); 96 Reggie Camp DE (IR); 71 Dave Cullity T (IR); 35 Will Hill S (IR); 48 D. D. Hoggard CB (IR); 54 Mike Junkin LB (IR); -- Steve Lawrence S (PUP); 40 Aaron Sam RB (IR); 66 Dave Sparenberg G (IR); -- Robert Stallings TE (IR); 38 George Swarn RB (IR); 87 Travis Tucker TE (IR); 5 George Winslow P (IR); Rookies in italics

== Schedule ==
=== Regular season ===
Week	Date	Opponent	Result	Record	Venue	Attendance	Recap
1	September 13	at New Orleans Saints	**L** 21–28	0–1	Louisiana Superdome	59,900	Recap
2	September 20	**Pittsburgh Steelers**	**W** 34–10	1–1	Cleveland Municipal Stadium	79,543	Recap
3	September 28	Denver Broncos	canceled	1–1	Cleveland Municipal Stadium	NFL strike	
4	October 4	at New England Patriots	**W** 20–10	2–1	Sullivan Stadium	14,830	Recap
5	October 11	**Houston Oilers**	**L** 10–15	2–2	Cleveland Municipal Stadium	38,927	Recap
6	October 18	at **Cincinnati Bengals**	**W** 34–0	3–2	Riverfront Stadium	40,179	Recap
7	October 26	Los Angeles Rams	**W** 30–17	4–2	Cleveland Municipal Stadium	76,933	Recap
8	November 1	at San Diego Chargers	**L** 24–27	4–3	Jack Murphy Stadium	55,381	Recap
9	November 8	Atlanta Falcons	**W** 38–3	5–3	Cleveland Municipal Stadium	71,135	Recap
10	November 15	Buffalo Bills	**W** 27–21	6–3	Cleveland Municipal Stadium	78,409	Recap
11	November 22	at **Houston Oilers**	**W** 40–7	7–3	Houston Astrodome	51,161	Recap
12	November 29	at San Francisco 49ers	**L** 24–38	7–4	Candlestick Park	60,248	Recap
13	December 6	Indianapolis Colts	**L** 7–9	7–5	Cleveland Municipal Stadium	70,661	Recap
14	December 13	**Cincinnati Bengals**	**W** 38–24	8–5	Cleveland Municipal Stadium	77,331	Recap
15	December 20	at Los Angeles Raiders	**W** 24–17	9–5	Los Angeles Memorial Coliseum	40,275	Recap
16	December 26	at **Pittsburgh Steelers**	**W** 19–13	10–5	Three Rivers Stadium	56,394	Recap
Note: Intra-division opponents are in **bold** text.

== Game summaries ==
=== Week 9: vs. Atlanta ===
Week 9: Atlanta Falcons at Cleveland Browns – Game summary

Quarter	1	2	3	4	Total
Falcons	0	3	0	0	3
Browns	0	14	21	3	38

at Cleveland Municipal Stadium, Cleveland, Ohio

- Date: November 8
- Game time: 1:00 p.m. EST
- Game weather: 54 °F or 12.2 °C, relative humidity 48%, wind 13 miles per hour (21 km/h; 11 kn)
- Game attendance: 71,135
- Referee: Bob McElwee
- TV announcers (CBS): Tim Brant (play–by–play) and Hank Stram (color commentator)

Game information

First quarter

- No scoring plays

Second quarter

- CLE (6:50) – Slaughter 54 yard pass from Kosar (Jaeger kick)
  Browns 7, Falcons 0
- CLE (11:04) – Mack 1 yard rush (Jaeger kick)
  Browns 14, Falcons 0
- ATL (15:00) – Luckhurst 42 yard field goal
  Browns 14, Falcons 3

Third quarter

- CLE (4:05) – Byner 3 yard rush (Jaeger kick)
  Browns 21, Falcons 3
- CLE (8:59) – Byner 5 yard rush (Jaeger kick)
  Browns 28, Falcons 3
- CLE (12:45) – Byner 4 yard pass from Kosar (Jaeger kick)
  Browns 35, Falcons 3

Fourth quarter

- CLE (9:41) – Jaeger 38 yard field goal
  Browns 38, Falcons 3

Top passers

- ATL – Scott Campbell 15/22, 169 yds, 1 INT
- CLE – Bernie Kosar 13/23, 192 yds, 2 TD

Top rushers

- ATL – Gerald Riggs 16 carr, 93 yds
- CLE – Kevin Mack 18 carr, 52 yds, 1 TD

Top receivers

- ATL – Aubrey Matthews 5 rec, 70 yds
- CLE – Earnest Byner 4 rec, 40 yds, 1 TD

Turnovers

- ATL – 2
- CLE – 1

== Postseason ==
Round	Date	Opponent (seed)	Result	Record	Venue	Attendance	Recap
Divisional	January 9, 1988	Indianapolis Colts (3)	W 38–21	1–0	Cleveland Municipal Stadium	78,586	Recap
AFC Championship	January 17, 1988	at Denver Broncos (2)	L 33–38	1–1	Mile High Stadium	75,993	Recap

AFC Divisional Game

AFC Divisional Game: Indianapolis Colts at Cleveland Browns – Game summary

Quarter	1	2	3	4	Total
Colts	7	7	0	7	21
Browns	7	7	7	17	38

at Cleveland Municipal Stadium, Cleveland, Ohio

- Date: January 9, 1988
- Game time: 12:30 p.m. EDT
- Game weather: 16 °F or −8.9 °C, relative humidity 71%, wind 5 miles per hour (8.0 km/h; 4.3 kn)
- Referee: Red Cashion
- TV: NBC
- Boxscore

AFC Championship game

AFC Championship game: Cleveland Browns at Denver Broncos – Game summary

Quarter	1	2	3	4	Total
Browns	0	3	21	9	33
Broncos	14	7	10	7	38

at Mile High Stadium, Denver, Colorado

- Date: January 17, 1988
- Game time: 4 p.m. EDT
- Game weather: 29 °F or −1.7 °C, relative humidity 63%, wind 8 miles per hour (13 km/h; 7.0 kn)
- Referee: Jim Tunney
- TV: NBC Dick Enberg, Merlin Olsen
- Boxscore

== Standings ==
AFC Central
	W	L	T	PCT	DIV	CONF	PF	PA	STK
^{(2)} Cleveland Browns	10	5	0	.667	5–1	8–3	390	239	W3
^{(4)} Houston Oilers	9	6	0	.600	5–1	7–4	345	349	W2
Pittsburgh Steelers	8	7	0	.533	2–4	6–5	285	299	L2
Cincinnati Bengals	4	11	0	.267	0–6	3–9	285	370	L3
