= Jim Tolbert =

American football player (born 1944)

No. 43, 42, 45
- Position: Defensive back

Personal information
- Born: March 12, 1944 (age 82); Fairfield, Alabama, U.S.
- Listed height: 6 ft 4 in (1.93 m)
- Listed weight: 200 lb (91 kg)

Career information
- High school: Fairfield
- College: Lincoln
- AFL draft: 1966: 7th round, 7th overall pick

Career history
- San Diego Chargers (1966–1971); Houston Oilers (1972); St. Louis Cardinals (1973–1975); San Diego Chargers (1976)

Career statistics
- Games played: 105
- Interceptions: 10
- Stats at Pro Football Reference

Love James Tolbert (born March 12, 1944) is an American former professional football player who was a defensive back for 11 years in the American Football League (AFL) and National Football League (NFL) from 1966 through 1976. Before his professional career, Tolbert played college football for the Lincoln Blue Tigers.

== See also ==
- List of Tennessee Titans players
- Other American Football League players
