= Frances Northcutt =

Former NASA Trajectory Engineer

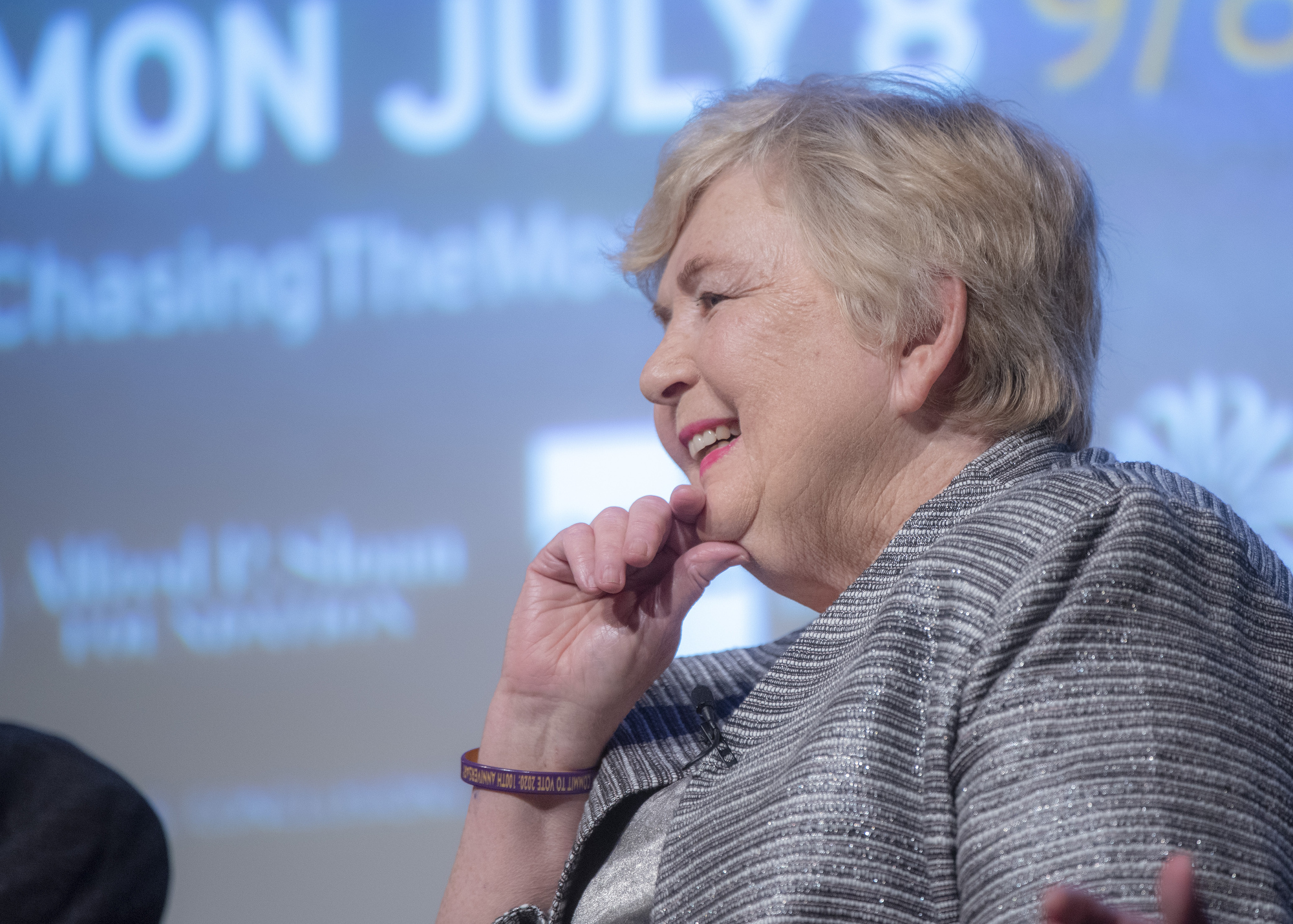
- Northcutt in 2019
- Born: August 10, 1943 (age 83); Many, Louisiana U.S.
- Other name: Poppy
- Education: University of Texas; University of Houston Law Center
- Occupations: Engineer, lawyer, stockbroker

Frances "Poppy" Northcutt (born August 10, 1943) is an American engineer and attorney who began her career as a computer operator and was later a member of the technical staff of NASA's Apollo program during the Space Race. During the Apollo 8 mission she became the first female engineer to work in NASA's Mission Control.

Later in her career, Northcutt became an attorney specializing in women's rights. In the early 1970s, she served on the national board of directors of the National Organization for Women. She has worked in Houston advocating for abortion rights.

== Early life ==
Northcutt was born in Many, Louisiana, on August 10, 1943. She grew up in Luling, Texas, and then moved to Dayton, Texas. Northcutt attended high school at Dayton High School in Liberty County and then went on to study mathematics at the University of Texas.

== Career ==
=== Apollo Program ===
After graduating in three and a half years, Northcutt was hired in 1965 by TRW, an aerospace contractor with NASA in Houston, as a computer for the new Apollo program. After six months, she had her first performance evaluation, and the head of Houston operations wanted to promote her to technical staff, the term they used for staff doing engineering work. Northcutt was the first woman to work as technical staff. The pay difference between the computress role and the technical staff role was so large that the company did not have mechanisms in place to approve Northcutt's promotion. The operations manager had to schedule pay raises as frequently as possible so that Northcutt's salary was equitable compared to her male colleagues. This experience with the gender pay gap inspired Northcutt's later activism for women's rights.

Northcutt was stationed in the Mission Control's Mission Planning and Analysis room. Northcutt and her team designed the return-to-Earth trajectory that the Apollo 8 crew took from the Moon back to Earth. She was able to identify mistakes in the plan, including making calculations that lowered the amount of fuel used to swing around the Moon. Apollo 8 was the second crewed Apollo spacecraft and became the first crewed mission to ever leave Earth orbit. It successfully reached the Moon, orbited it and then returned to Earth safely on December 27, 1968.

Northcutt continued working with TRW and NASA for several more years, working NASA missions such as Apollo 13. After learning about the exploded oxygen tank on the Apollo 13 mission, Northcutt and the other engineers who developed the computer program for Apollo 13 all came in to find a way to get the astronauts home safely. The program that she worked on was used to compute the maneuvers used to return the spacecraft. Northcutt and the Mission Operations Team were later awarded the Presidential Medal of Freedom Team Award for their work on Apollo 13. In 2019 she gave an interview about her Apollo work.

Lay-audience books and articles have claimed that a lunar crater near where the Apollo 17 Lunar Module landed was named for her. However, Gene Cernan, the commander of the Apollo 17 mission, stated in an interview for the Apollo Lunar Surface Journal that in advance of the mission, he had named a crater after the nickname that his daughter used for one of her grandfathers. That nickname was "Poppie." NASA documents misspelled it as "Poppy." Apollo crews and the NASA Astronaut Office assigned unofficial names to lunar features for convenience in referring to them. Other names given by Cernan to craters near the landing site were "Punk," his nickname for his daughter, and "Frosty" and "Rudolph," the names of characters in children's Christmastime stories. The International Astronomical Union's / U.S. Geological Survey's Gazetteer of Planetary Nomenclature has no entries for lunar craters named either "Poppie" or "Poppy."

On December 19, 2023, the IAU: WG Small Bodies Nomenclature (WGSBN) announce that the Main-belt Asteroid (355657)2008 EA89 was named "Poppy" in her honor.

=== Women's rights movement ===
While at TRW, Northcutt served on the company's affirmative action committee and advocated to improve its pregnancy leave policies. As one of few women working in engineering, Northcutt became increasingly involved in the women's liberation movement. She helped organize demonstrations, strikes, speeches, press releases and whatever else she could to help the cause with the National Organization for Women. She spoke at Houston City Council many times, and in 1974 the mayor of Houston named her the first Women's Advocate for the city. In this position she helped pass legislation improving the status of women. She negotiated an agreement with the Houston Police Department enabling women to become police officers. She got the Houston Fire Department to agree to let women serve as firefighters. She led an equal-pay study of the entire Houston municipal payroll. She was so dedicated to improving equality that she counted women's versus men's bathrooms throughout all of Houston, helping to bring even this number into parity.

Northcutt helped drastically increase the number of women that were on appointed boards and commissions. She helped pass a law that prohibited hospitals from charging women who came in for rape kits. Later on, Northcutt would become President of both the city of Houston chapter and the state of Texas chapter for the National Organization for Women.

During this time, Northcutt was still employed by TRW, receiving a partial salary as she was on loan. When her loan expired, she went back to TRW for a while. However, she believed that "If you were doing your job, you should do yourself out of a job" and thus went to Merrill Lynch, a stockbroker firm, for a year. Northcutt then switched into the TRW Controls division and during this time attended law school at night.

=== Legal career ===
In 1984, Northcutt graduated summa cum laude from the University of Houston Law Center, becoming a criminal defense lawyer. Northcutt continued to practice law with special emphasis and dedication to her fight for civil rights. Northcutt worked for Jane's Due Process, an organization that ensures protections for pregnant legal minors. She also worked for the Harris County District Attorney's office and was the first prosecutor in the Domestic Violence Unit.

== In popular culture ==
She is mentioned in the Apple TV+ show For All Mankind. She is also profiled and interviewed in PBS' American Experience "Chasing The Moon, Pt.2".

== Further reading and viewing ==
- Steafel, Eleanor (July 20, 2019). "One woman in a room full of men". The Telegraph Magazine. London: Daily Telegraph plc. pp. 56–59, 61. OCLC 69022829.
- "Poppy Northcutt: Return to Earth Specialist (digital short)". American Experience: Chasing the Moon. PBS. July 10, 2019.
- Frances “Poppy” Northcutt discusses being the first woman to work in NASA’s Mission Control, on YouTube, Los Angeles Times
- "Frances M. "Poppy" Northcutt Oral History". NASA Johnson Space Center Oral History Project. November 14, 2018.
- "Northcutt, Frances Poppy - Mayor Bill White Oral History Collection". Houston Public Library Digital Archives. April 3, 2008. (Video of interview by Jane Ely of Frances Poppy Northcutt))
