= Billy Bell (defensive back) =

American football player (born 1961)

No. 33, 4, 40
- Position: Cornerback

Personal information
- Born: January 16, 1961 (age 65); Dayton, Texas, U.S.
- Listed height: 5 ft 10 in (1.78 m)
- Listed weight: 170 lb (77 kg)

Career information
- High school: Dayton (Texas)
- College: Lamar
- NFL draft: 1986: undrafted

Career history
- Houston Oilers (1989); BC Lions (1990); Kansas City Chiefs (1991); Houston Oilers (1992)*; Dallas Texans (1993); Toronto Argonauts (1994)*; Las Vegas Sting (1995)*
- * Offseason or practice squad member only
- Stats at Pro Football Reference
- Stats at ArenaFan.com

Billy Ray Bell (born January 16, 1961) is an American former professional football player who was a cornerback for two seasons in the National Football League (NFL) with the Houston Oilers and Kansas City Chiefs. He played college football for the Lamar Cardinals. He also played for the BC Lions of the Canadian Football League (CFL) and the Dallas Texans of the Arena Football League (AFL).

== Early life and college ==
Billy Ray Bell was born on January 16, 1961, in Dayton, Texas. He attended Dayton High School in Dayton.

Bell was a three-year letterman for the Lamar Cardinals of Lamar University from 1983 to 1985.

== Professional career ==
Bell signed with the Houston Oilers on May 4, 1989. He was released on September 5, signed to the practice squad on September 8, promoted to the active roster on November 4, released again on November 21, signed to the practice squad again on November 24, and promoted to the active roster again on December 8, 1989. Overall, he played in four games for the Oilers during the 1989 season. Bell also appeared in one playoff game that year.

Bell dressed in four games for the BC Lions of the Canadian Football League in 1990, recording ten tackles and one interception.

Bell was signed by the Kansas City Chiefs on May 5, 1991. He was released on August 27, re-signed on September 11, released again on October 1, and re-signed again on October 4. Overall, he played in eight games, starting one, for the Chiefs in 1991 and made one interception. Bell was placed on injured reserve on November 16, 1991. He was released on January 2, 1992.

Bell signed with the Oilers again on May 19, 1992, but was later released on August 31, 1992.

He played in two games for the Dallas Texans of the Arena Football League (AFL) in 1993, totaling four solo tackles and four assisted tackles.

Bell signed with the Toronto Argonauts of the CFL in 1994 but was later released.

He was signed by the Las Vegas Sting of the AFL in 1995 but was later released.
