= Peninsula Catholic High School =

College preparatory school in Virginia, US

Location
- 600 Harpersville Road; Newport News, Virginia 23601; United States; 37°4′14″N 76°27′27″W

Information
- School type: Private, coeducational, Diocesan College Preparatory, Catholic
- Religious affiliation: Catholic Church
- Established: 1903
- Oversight: Diocese of Richmond
- Principal: Heather Whitchurch
- Faculty: 27.6 (FTE)
- Grades: 8–12
- Enrollment: 260 (2023–2024)
- Student to teacher ratio: 9.4:1
- Campus type: Midsize city
- Colors: Blue and White
- Nickname: PCHS
- Team name: Knights
- Rivals: Hampton Roads Navigators; Walsingham Trojans
- Accreditation: AdvancED
- Tuition: $12,000-$17,300
- Feeder schools: Our Lady of Mount Carmel School, Saint Mary Star of the Sea School, Portsmouth Catholic Regional School
- Website: www.peninsulacatholic.org

Peninsula Catholic High School is a college preparatory regional Catholic school of the Diocese of Richmond located in Newport News, Virginia in the United states, which offers grades 8 through 12.

It is a member of the National Catholic Educational Association (NCEA) and is accredited byAdvancED.

== History ==
Peninsula Catholic High School was founded in 1903 as St. Vincent de Paul School for girls by the Sisters of Charity of Nazareth with the help of Mr. and Mrs. Thomas Fortune Ryan, who donated significant funds and the original school building in downtown Newport News; it became co-educational in 1929 when the Xaverian Brothers closed their school for boys. It was renamed Peninsula Catholic High school in 1966 by Bishop Russell, in the belief that the name should reflect all supporting parishes. The school opened a new facility in the fall of 1995 on Harpersville Road. In 2015, a $2.1 million athletic complex was completed. Since the 1984–85 school year, Peninsula Catholic has been under lay administration.

== Demographics ==
65% of Peninsula Catholic students are Catholic. There is a 30% minority enrollment.

== Alma mater ==
The Peninsula Catholic alma mater is set to the tune "Annie Lisle" (sometimes called Amici) a popular 1857 Ballad by H. S. Thompson. The tune is one of the most popular "alma mater tunes" and has been adopted by many Schools, Colleges and Universities as settings for their alma maters, including The College of William and Mary, University of North Carolina at Chapel Hill, and Cornell University.

== Weekend programs ==
The Newport News Japanese School (NNJS; ニューポートニュース補習授業校 Nyūpōto Nyūsu Hoshū Jugyō Kō), a weekend Japanese school, holds its classes at Peninsula Catholic.

== Notable alumni ==
- Robert Banks (born 1963) American football player
