= Keith McDonald (American football) =

American football player (born 1963)

No. 81, 89
- Position: Wide receiver

Personal information
- Born: November 7, 1963 (age 63); Los Angeles, California, U.S.
- Listed height: 5 ft 9 in (1.75 m)
- Listed weight: 170 lb (77 kg)

Career information
- High school: Phineas Banning (Los Angeles)
- College: San Jose State
- NFL draft: 1985: undrafted

Career history
- Denver Gold (1985)*; Dallas Cowboys (1985)*; Los Angeles Rams (1986)*; Houston Oilers (1987); Houston Oilers (1988)*; BC Lions (1988)*; Detroit Lions (1989); Los Angeles Raiders (1990)*; San Diego Chargers (1991)*
- * Offseason or practice squad member only

Career NFL statistics
- Receptions: 16
- Receiving yards: 194
- Touchdowns: 1
- Stats at Pro Football Reference

Rodney Keith McDonald (born November 7, 1963) is an American former professional football player who was a wide receiver the Houston Oilers and the Detroit Lions of the National Football League (NFL). He played college football for the San Jose State Spartans. McDonald made his NFL debut in 1987 when the NFPLA went on strike.

== Early life and education ==
McDonald was born on November 7, 1963. He played high school football at Phineas Banning High School in Los Angeles, California. In high school, McDonald's play was described as "explosive", making the Second-Team All-Harbor in his senior year.

McDonald attended Santa Monica College where he stayed for two years before transferring to San Jose State University. In his two seasons with the Spartans, McDonald put up 898 yards on 80 receptions and four touchdowns.

== Professional career ==
After his 1984 season, McDonald signed with the USFL's Denver Gold but ultimately did not make the final roster. Before the 1985 NFL season, McDonald was signed to the Dallas Cowboys and reported to training camp, but was waived shortly after. McDonald would sign to the Los Angeles Rams a year later, but was also waived in training camp.

In 1987, due to the NFPLA strike, McDonald signed to the Houston Oilers as a replacement player. McDonald played his first NFL game against the Denver Broncos where he caught two passes for 31 yards. His first receiving touchdown came in his second game against the Cleveland Browns, where he took his only reception of the game 15 yards for the score. After the strike concluded, McDonald was waived from the team. Before the 1988 season, the Oilers re-signed McDonald but released him two months later. He would also briefly sign with the BC Lions.

McDonald signed to the Lions and played in their preseason games during the 1989 season, but was waived shortly before the beginning of the regular season. He was signed back to the active roster on October 11, 1989. He would play six regular season games for the Lions, catching for 194 yards on 16 receptions. He would be placed on injured reserve following a Week 12 game, ending his season.

McDonald would sign to the Los Angeles Raiders, but was waived. He would also sign with the San Diego Chargers but he would be injured in training camp.

== Career statistics ==
=== NFL ===
Season	Team	GP	GS	Receiving			
Season	Team	GP	GS	Rec	Yds	Avg	TD
1987	Houston Oilers	3	0	4	56	14.0	1
1989	Detroit Lions	6	3	12	138	11.5	0
Total		9	3	16	194	12.1	1

=== College ===
Season	Team	GP	Receiving			
Season	Team	GP	Rec	Yds	Avg	TD
1983	San Jose State	11	50	536	10.7	2
1984	San Jose State	11	30	362	12.1	2
Total		22	80	898	11.2	4
