= Jeff Gossett =

American football player (born 1957)

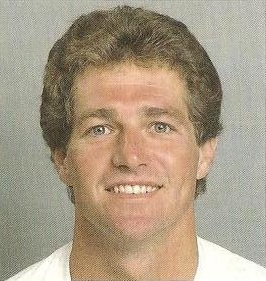

No. 7, 8, 6
- Position: Punter

Personal information
- Born: January 25, 1957 (age 69); Charleston, Illinois, U.S.
- Listed height: 6 ft 2 in (1.88 m)
- Listed weight: 200 lb (91 kg)

Career information
- High school: Charleston
- College: Eastern Illinois
- NFL draft: 1980: undrafted

Career history
- Dallas Cowboys (1980)*; San Diego Chargers (1981)*; Kansas City Chiefs (1981–1982); Cleveland Browns (1983); Chicago Blitz (1984); Portland Breakers (1985); Cleveland Browns (1985–1987); Houston Oilers (1987); Los Angeles/Oakland Raiders (1988–1996)
- * Offseason or practice squad member only

Awards and highlights
- First-team All-Pro (1991); Pro Bowl (1991); PFW Golden Toe Award (1991)

Career NFL statistics
- Punts: 982
- Punting yards: 40,569
- Punting yard average: 41.3
- Stats at Pro Football Reference

Jeff Alan Gossett (born January 25, 1957) is an American former professional football player who was a punter in the National Football League (NFL) and the United States Football League (USFL). He played college football for the Eastern Illinois Panthers.

== Early life ==
Gossett attended Charleston High School. In football, he played as a quarterback and punter. He also practiced baseball and basketball.

== College career ==
Gossett, accepted an athletic scholarship from Eastern Illinois University. As a sophomore, he led the NCAA Division II in punting with a then school record 43.1-yard average. He also set the school records career average (40.7) and longest punt (77 yards).

He competed in baseball as a shortstop. In 1978, he contributed to the team earning a fifth place in the College Division World Series. He set the school record for triples in a season (7) and in a career (14), while ranking in the top ten in career hits, home runs and RBIs.

In 1987, he was inducted into the school's Sports Hall of Fame.

== Baseball career ==
In 1978, Gossett was selected in the fifth round by the New York Mets and played in their farm system for two seasons as an outfielder and third baseman. He left after he was asked to convert into a pitcher.

== Professional career ==
=== Dallas Cowboys ===
Gossett was signed as an undrafted free agent by the Dallas Cowboys after the 1980 NFL draft on April 30. He was released before the start of the season on August 25.

=== San Diego Chargers ===
On March 9, 1981, he signed as a free agent with the San Diego Chargers. On August 31, he was released after the team acquired punter George Roberts.

=== Kansas City Chiefs ===
On November 5, 1981, he was signed by the Kansas City Chiefs to replace an injured Bob Grupp, finishing with a 39.3-yard punt average.

In 1982, he was cut before the seventh game of the season and surprisingly brought back a week later after a terrible showing by rookie Case deBruijn against the Denver Broncos. He ranked fourth in the American Football Conference with a 41.4-yard average, but his net average of 30.9 was the worst in the league.

On August 29, 1983, he was released after losing a preseason competition with rookie fifth round draft choice Jim Arnold.

=== Cleveland Browns ===
On August 31, 1983, he was claimed off waivers by the Cleveland Browns, to replace Steve Cox, who was recovering from a surgery to remove a blockage between his brain and his spinal cord. He had a 40.8-yard average on 70 punts.

=== Chicago Blitz ===
On December 20, 1983, he was signed by the Chicago Blitz of the United States Football League. In 1984, he led the league with a 42.5-yard average on 85 punts, including downing 18 punts inside the 20-yard line.

=== Portland Breakers ===
In 1985, he played for the Portland Breakers of the United States Football League. He ranked fourth in the league with 74 punts for a 42.2-yard average, including 19 kicks downed inside the 20-yard line.

=== Cleveland Browns ===
On January 27, 1985, he signed with the Cleveland Browns after the United States Football League folded, averaging 40.3 yards on 81 punts, including a career-long punt of 64 yards against the St. Louis Cardinals.

In 1986, he had 83 punts for a 41.2-yard average, including a 61-yard punt against the Minnesota Vikings. He experienced some struggles, like the contest against the Houston Oilers, when he shanked five consecutive punts.

In 1987, he played in the first 5 games of the season, before being replaced with rookie punter George Winslow and released on November 18.

=== Houston Oilers ===
On December 2, 1987, he signed as a free agent with the Houston Oilers. He played in the last 4 games of the season.

In 1988, the team drafted punter Greg Montgomery in the third round and traded Gossett to the Los Angeles Raiders on August 15, in exchange for undisclosed future considerations.

=== Los Angeles Raiders ===
In 1988, he was acquired to replace punter Stan Talley. He finished fourth in the league with a 41.8-yard average on 91 punts, was third in the American Football Conference in net punting with 35.7-yard average and tied for the league lead for punts downed inside the 20-yard line with 27. He had a 58-yard punt against the Miami Dolphins.

In 1991, he switched his jersey number from 6 to 7, and went on to average a career-high 44.2 yards per punt, while being named an All-Pro and selected to the Pro Bowl roster.

In 1996, he was the NFL's oldest punter at age 39. He broke four ribs after being tackled on a fake punt in the twelfth game against the Seattle Seahawks. On November 27, 1996, he was placed on the injured reserve list. He was replaced with Leo Araguz. He was released on February 14, 1997.

Gossett finished his Raiders career with 642 punts (at the time second in team history) for 26,747 yards (at the time second in team history) and averaged 41.7 yards per punt. Overall he had 982 punts for 40,569 yards and averaged 41.3 yards per punt.

== NFL career statistics ==
Legend
**Bold**	Career high

=== Regular season ===
Year	Team	Punting									
Year	Team	GP	Punts	Yds	Net Yds	Lng	Avg	Net Avg	Blk	Ins20	TB
1981	KAN	7	29	1,141	953	55	39.3	32.9	0	4	3
1982	KAN	8	33	1,366	1,019	56	41.4	30.9	0	6	5
1983	CLE	**16**	70	2,854	2,385	60	40.8	34.1	0	17	8
1985	CLE	**16**	81	3,261	2,797	64	40.3	34.5	0	18	8
1986	CLE	**16**	83	3,423	2,955	61	41.2	35.6	0	21	10
1987	CLE	5	19	769	641	55	40.5	33.7	0	4	4
1987	HOU	4	25	1,008	782	53	40.3	30.1	1	0	2
1988	RAI	**16**	**91**	**3,804**	**3,247**	58	41.8	35.7	0	**27**	8
1989	RAI	**16**	67	2,711	2,270	60	40.5	33.9	0	12	7
1990	RAI	**16**	60	2,315	2,082	57	38.6	33.6	**2**	19	4
1991	RAI	**16**	67	2,961	2,580	61	**44.2**	**38.5**	0	26	2
1992	RAI	**16**	77	3,255	2,810	56	42.3	36.5	0	17	3
1993	RAI	**16**	71	2,971	2,490	61	41.8	35.1	0	19	9
1994	RAI	**16**	77	3,377	2,711	**65**	43.9	35.2	0	19	**15**
1995	OAK	**16**	75	3,089	2,635	60	41.2	34.7	1	22	8
1996	OAK	12	57	2,264	1,972	64	39.7	34.6	0	19	5
Career		212	982	40,569	34,329	65	41.3	34.8	4	250	101

=== Playoffs ===
Year	Team	Punting									
Year	Team	GP	Punts	Yds	Net Yds	Lng	Avg	Net Avg	Blk	Ins20	TB
1985	CLE	1	6	223	200	57	37.2	33.3	0	0	0
1986	CLE	**2**	**14**	**569**	**473**	**58**	**40.6**	33.8	0	**3**	**2**
1987	HOU	**2**	6	239	158	57	39.8	26.3	0	1	0
1990	RAI	**2**	5	200	150	52	40.0	30.0	0	2	1
1991	RAI	1	1	20	20	20	20.0	20.0	0	0	0
1993	RAI	**2**	10	392	347	50	39.2	**34.7**	0	**3**	0
Career		10	42	1,643	1,348	58	39.1	32.1	0	9	3

== Personal life ==
He was a member of Sigma Pi fraternity.
