= Steve Nave (American football) =

American football player (born 1963)

No. 57
- Position: Linebacker

Personal information
- Born: August 29, 1963 (age 63); Nowata, Oklahoma, U.S.
- Listed height: 6 ft 2 in (1.88 m)
- Listed weight: 250 lb (113 kg)

Career information
- High school: Field Kindley
- College: Kansas
- NFL draft: 1987: undrafted

Career history
- Washington Redskins (1987)*; Cleveland Browns (1987)
- * Offseason or practice squad member only

Career NFL statistics
- Games played: 2
- Stats at Pro Football Reference

Steven Lewis Nave (born August 29, 1963) is an American former professional football player who was a linebacker for the Cleveland Browns of the National Football League (NFL). He played college football for the Kansas Jayhawks.
