= Don Brown (running back) =

American football player (1937–2013)

No. 47
- Position: Running back

Personal information
- Born: August 30, 1937; Dayton, Texas, U.S.
- Died: June 23, 2013 (aged 75); Dayton, Texas, U.S.
- Listed height: 6 ft 1 in (1.85 m)
- Listed weight: 205 lb (93 kg)

Career information
- High school: Dayton
- College: Houston
- NFL draft: 1959: 2nd round, 20th overall pick

Career history
- Green Bay Packers (1960)*; Houston Oilers (1960)
- * Offseason or practice squad member only

Awards and highlights
- AFL champion (1960)
- Stats at Pro Football Reference

Don Albert Brown (August 20, 1937 – June 25, 2013) was an American football player who survived a near fatal accident at the annual College All-Star Game and was part of one of the biggest trades in pro football history. He played one season in the American Football League (AFL) in 1960.

Born in Dayton, Texas, Brown attended Dayton High School, where he played high school football from 1953 to 1955. He then attended University of Houston where he played for the football team as a running back and defensive back from 1956 to 1958, earning an All-America honorable mention during his senior year.

On Aug. 14, 1959, Brown played for the College All-Stars against the defending NFL champions, the Baltimore Colts. He was the recipient of a violent hit by Colts linebacker Bill Pellington on which he swallowed his tongue and stopped breathing momentarily. He laid unconscious for several minutes before the team medical staff was able to revive him.

Brown was drafted by the Los Angeles Rams with the 20th pick in the 1959 NFL draft but was immediately traded for Ollie Matson of the Chicago Cardinals. This trade was a significant ice -- Brown was one of nine players dealt for the star halfback even though he would never play a game for his new team. He had a brief stint with the Green Bay Packers with under head coach Vince Lombardi before returning home to try out for the newly formed Houston Oilers, where he played three games.
