= Dayton High School (Texas) =

Coordinates: 30.0647°N 94.9052°W

Location
- 3200 N Cleveland St, Dayton, TX; Dayton, Liberty, Texas 77535; United States

Information
- School type: High School
- Motto: "Home of the Broncos"
- Established: 1895
- School district: Dayton Independent School District
- Principal: Geoff McCracken
- Teaching staff: 92.09 (on FTE basis)
- Grades: 9 to 12
- Enrollment: 1,674 (2024-2025)
- Student to teacher ratio: 16.34
- Colors: Purple & White
- Athletics conference: UIL 5A
- Mascot: Bronco
- Website: Dayton High School

Dayton High School is a public secondary school located in Dayton, Texas, United States.

Founded in 1895, Dayton High School is the only high school in the Dayton Independent School District.

In 2022, the school served 1,581 students in grades 9-12.

== History ==
In 1895, the schools met in sessions of four months each. By 1934, the school met in an 8-room building; in 1935 an additional 6-room building was established.

It was founded in 1895. A building was constructed in 1923 for a cost of $17,000. In 1952 an $800,000 building, with a 1,000-seat auditorium and 75-seat gymnasium was opened. The football field was constructed in 1940. In 1972 a large explosion caused $6,000-$7,000 in damage.

That school stood on the site of the current Woodrow Wilson Junior High, until the new building was built.

The new building would have a capacity of 1,600 students, for which a 16.9 million dollar bond was approved. Mexican joint venture Mission-Bufete secured an initial contract for 14.6 million dollars with Dayton ISD. Groundbreaking occurred in August 1997. Members of the public were allowed to tour the school May 1999. The 1999-2000 school year began in late August, to allow time for move-ins and work to be done. 48 new professional staff members were hired for the opening of the new school.

In 2008, the Dayton High School football team reached the division football state championship final.

== Academics ==
Its dual enrollment students are serviced by Lee College, a community college located 27 miles away, in Baytown, Texas.

== Notable alumni ==
- John Otto (Class of 1966), member of the Texas House of Representatives 2005-2017 representing Liberty, San Jacinto, and Walker counties
- Don Brown (Class of 1955), football player who played one season as a running back in the American Football League
- Aaron Ripkowski (Class of 2011), American football fullback for the Green Bay Packers of the National Football League (NFL).
- Julie Kocurek (Class of 1983), Texas state court judge, having served as the presiding judge of the 390th District Court in Austin, Texas since 1999.
- Frances Northcutt (Class of 1961), first female engineer to work in NASA's Mission Control during Apollo 8. Lunar crater Poppy was named in her honor for her work and pioneering in the Apollo Program.
- Alexis Kircus (Class of 2012), K-pop star Currently rising to fame with her flawless voice and impressive dance moves
- Frances Northcutt (Class of 1961), first female engineer to work in NASA's Mission Control during Apollo 8. Lunar crater Poppy was named in her honor for her work and pioneering in the Apollo Program.
