= Thad Jefferson =

American football player (born 1964)

No. 53
- Position: Linebacker

Personal information
- Born: March 11, 1964 (age 62); Ontario, California, U.S.
- Listed height: 5 ft 11 in (1.80 m)
- Listed weight: 225 lb (102 kg)

Career information
- High school: Ontario (Ontario, California)
- College: Hawaii
- NFL draft: 1987: undrafted

Career history
- Houston Oilers (1987)
- Stats at Pro Football Reference

Thaddius Eugene Jefferson (born March 11, 1964) is an American former professional football linebacker who was a 1987 replacement player for the Houston Oilers of the NFL. He played college football at Hawaii.

== College career ==
From 1983 to 1986, Jefferson played college football for the Hawaii Rainbow Warriors. He played running back for one year in 1983 before switching to linebacker in 1984. In 1985, he made all-WAC second-team defense, making 129 tackles that year alone, 81 of them solo.

Over his college career, Jefferson played in 43 games, made 298 total tackles, and recorded nine sacks. As of 2021, he had the ninth-highest amount of tackles all-time at Hawaii. His 129 total tackles in 1985 has him tied for the eighth-highest amount of single-season tackles at the university. He was also a member of Hawaii's "Warrior Club" for three years from 1984 to 1986.

== Professional career ==
Jefferson played with the Houston Oilers as a replacement player during the 1987 NFL players' strike. He started all three games affected by the strike: an October 4 game against the Denver Broncos, an October 11 game against the Cleveland Browns, and an October 18 game against the New England Patriots. He was released by the Oilers on October 21, 1987.

The Oilers signed Jefferson again on June 10, 1988, but released him on August 24.
