= Mark Dusbabek =

American football player (born 1964)

No. 59
- Position: Linebacker

Personal information
- Born: June 23, 1964 (age 62); Faribault, Minnesota, U.S.
- Listed height: 6 ft 3 in (1.91 m)
- Listed weight: 232 lb (105 kg)

Career information
- High school: Faribault (Minnesota)
- College: Minnesota (1983–1986)
- NFL draft: 1987: 4th round, 105th overall pick

Career history
- Houston Oilers (1987–1988); Minnesota Vikings (1989–1992)

Career NFL statistics
- Fumble recoveries: 3
- Interceptions: 1
- Safeties: 1
- Stats at Pro Football Reference

Mark Edward Dusbabek (born June 23, 1964) is an American former professional football player who was a linebacker for three seasons with the Minnesota Vikings of the National Football League (NFL). He was selected by the Houston Oilers in the fourth round of the 1987 NFL draft after playing college football for the Minnesota Golden Gophers.

== Early life and college ==
Mark Edward Dusbabek was born on June 23, 1964, in Faribault, Minnesota. He attended Faribault High School in Faribault.

Dusbabek was a four-year letterman for the Minnesota Golden Gophers of the University of Minnesota from 1983 to 1986.

== Professional career ==
Dusbabek was selected by the Houston Oilers in the fourth round, with the 105th overall pick, of the 1987 NFL draft. He officially signed with the team on July 28. He was placed on injured reserve on August 31, 1987, and spent the entire season there. Dusbabek was placed on injured reserve again on August 29, 1988, and missed the entire season for the second straight year. He became a free agent after the 1988 season.

Dusbabek signed with the Minnesota Vikings on April 1, 1989. He played in all 16 games, starting one, during the 1989 season, recording one interception and two fumble recoveries. He also started one playoff game that year. Dusbabek appeared in 14 games, starting 11, in 1990, totaling one safety and one fumble recovery. He became a free agent after the 1990 season and re-signed with the Vikings on July 22, 1991. Dusbabek started the first game of the 1991 season before being placed on injured reserve on September 3, 1991, and missing the rest of the year. He became a free agent again in 1992 and re-signed with the Vikings. He was placed on injured reserve for the fourth time in his career on August 31, 1992, and was released on November 17, 1992.

== Post-football career ==
Dusbabek has worked as a PGA Tour rules official since 2006.
