= Will Hill (defensive back, born 1963) =

American football player (born 1968)

No. 35
- Position: Safety

Personal information
- Born: March 5, 1963 (age 63); Vero Beach, Florida, U.S.
- Listed height: 6 ft 0 in (1.83 m)
- Listed weight: 200 lb (91 kg)

Career information
- High school: Vero Beach
- College: Bishop
- NFL draft: 1987: undrafted

Career history
- Cleveland Browns (1987–1988); Kansas City Chiefs (1990)*
- * Offseason or practice squad member only
- Stats at Pro Football Reference

Willie Jay Hill (born March 5, 1963) is an American former professional football safety who played for the Cleveland Browns of the National Football League (NFL). He played college football for the Bishop Tigers.

== Early life ==
Willie Jay Hill was born on March 5, 1963, in Vero Beach, Florida. He attended Vero Beach High School.

== College career ==
Hill enrolled at Ranger College for the 1982 junior college football season. He transferred to Bishop College to play for the Tigers. He was a member of the Tigers from 1983 to 1986 and recorded 24 career interceptions. Hill earned Southwestern Athletic Conference all-star honors as a senior in 1986.

== Professional career ==
After going undrafted in the 1987 NFL draft, Hill signed with the Cleveland Browns on May 4. He was placed on injured reserve on September 1, where he spent the entire 1987 season. He played in all 16 games, starting one, for the Browns at strong safety in 1988, recording one sack and one fumble recovery. Hill also started one playoff game. He was released on August 30, 1989, after the fourth of five preseason games.

Hill was signed by the Kansas City Chiefs on February 15, 1990. He was released on August 28, 1990, after the third preseason game.
