= Al Smith (American football) =

American football player (born 1964)

No. 54
- Position: Linebacker

Personal information
- Born: November 26, 1964 (age 61); Los Angeles, California, U.S.
- Listed height: 6 ft 1 in (1.85 m)
- Listed weight: 244 lb (111 kg)

Career information
- High school: St. Bernard (Los Angeles)
- College: Cal Poly-Pomona; Utah State
- NFL draft: 1987: 6th round, 147th overall pick

Career history
- Houston Oilers (1987–1996)

Awards and highlights
- First-team All-Pro (1992); 2× Pro Bowl (1991, 1992)

Career NFL statistics
- Tackles: 880
- Sacks: 5.5
- Interceptions: 2
- Stats at Pro Football Reference

Al Fredrick Smith (born November 26, 1964) is an American former professional football player who was a linebacker for the Houston Oilers of the National Football League (NFL). He played college football for the Utah State Aggies and Cal Poly Pomona Broncos. He was drafted in the sixth round of the 1987 NFL Draft by the Oilers.

Al Smith was inducted into the Utah State Hall of Fame in 2006.

== NFL career Statistics ==
Legend
**Bold**	Career high

=== Regular season ===
Year	Team	Games		Tackles				Interceptions		Fumbles	
Year	Team	GP	GS	Cmb	Solo	Ast	Sck	Int	Yds	FF	FR
1987	HOU	12	11	100	-	-	0	0	0	1	0
1988	HOU	16	16	98	-	-	0	0	0	1	**1**
1989	HOU	15	15	76	-	-	0	0	0	2	**1**
1990	HOU	15	15	104	-	-	1	0	0	**3**	**1**
1991	HOU	16	16	**146**	-	-	1	**1**	16	2	**1**
1992	HOU	16	16	122	-	-	1	**1**	**26**	0	0
1993	HOU	16	16	95	-	-	0	0	0	0	0
1994	HOU	16	16	132	**88**	**44**	**2.5**	0	0	0	**1**
1995	HOU	2	2	6	4	2	0	0	0	0	0
1996	HOU	1	1	1	0	1	0	0	0	0	0
Career		125	124	880	833	47	5.5	31	503	19	20

== Referencesui789 ==
3. Utah State Hall of Fame. 2006.
