= Dave Cullity =

American football player (born 1964)

No. 68
- Position: Offensive tackle

Personal information
- Born: June 15, 1964 (age 62); La Mirada, California, U.S.
- Listed height: 6 ft 7 in (2.01 m)
- Listed weight: 275 lb (125 kg)

Career information
- High school: La Serna (Whittier, California)
- College: Utah (1983–1986)
- NFL draft: 1987: undrafted

Career history
- Cleveland Browns (1987–1988); San Francisco 49ers (1989–1990)

Awards and highlights
- Super Bowl champion (XXIV)
- Stats at Pro Football Reference

David Richard Cullity (born June 15, 1964) is an American former professional football player who was an offensive tackle for one season with the San Francisco 49ers of the National Football League (NFL). He played college football for the Utah Utes. He was also a member of the Cleveland Browns.

== Early life and college ==
David Richard Cullity was born on June 15, 1964, in La Mirada, California. He attended La Serna High School in Whittier, California.

He was a member of the Utah Utes football team from 1983 to 1986 and a two-year letterman from 1985 to 1986.

== Professional career ==
After going undrafted in the 1987 NFL draft, Cullity signed with the Cleveland Browns on May 4, 1987. He was placed on injured reserve on September 1, 1987, and spent the entire season there. The next year, he was placed on injured reserve again on August 23, 1988, before being released on November 1, 1988.

Cullity was signed by the San Francisco 49ers on March 28, 1989. He was released on September 5 and signed to the practice squad on September 8. He was promoted to the active roster on October 7 and played in two games for the 49ers before being released on October 27. On November 1, Cullity was signed back to the practice squad, where he spent the remainder of the 1989 season. He was released on January 29, 1990, but later re-signed on February 22. He was placed on injured reserve for the third time in his career on August 28, 1990, and spent the whole season there. Cullity became a free agent after the 1990 season.

== Personal life ==
Cullity became a financial adviser after his NFL career.
