= Vincent Barnett =

American football player (born 1965)

No. 25
- Position: Defensive back

Personal information
- Born: February 19, 1965 (age 61); Mound Bayou, Mississippi, U.S.
- Listed height: 6 ft 0 in (1.83 m)
- Listed weight: 200 lb (91 kg)

Career information
- High school: Nugent Center (Benoit, Mississippi)
- College: Arkansas State
- NFL draft: 1987: undrafted

Career history
- Green Bay Packers (1987)*; Cleveland Browns (1987)
- * Offseason or practice squad member only
- Stats at Pro Football Reference

Vincent Crawford Barnett (born February 19, 1965) is an American former professional football defensive back. He played for the Cleveland Browns in 1987.
