= Billy Kidd (American football) =

American football player (born 1959)

No. 50
- Position: Center

Personal information
- Born: November 28, 1959 (age 66); Dallas, Texas, U.S.
- Listed height: 6 ft 4 in (1.93 m)
- Listed weight: 270 lb (122 kg)

Career information
- High school: Keller (TX)
- College: Houston
- NFL draft: 1983: undrafted

Career history
- Houston Oilers (1983)*; Houston Gamblers (1984-1985); Houston Oilers (1987)
- * Offseason or practice squad member only
- Stats at Pro Football Reference

William Wayne Kidd Jr. (born November 28, 1959) is an American former professional football player who was a center for the Houston Oilers of the National Football League (NFL). He played college football for the Houston Cougars.
