= Andrew Jackson (running back) =

American football player (born 1964)

No. 39
- Position: Running back

Personal information
- Born: May 6, 1964 (age 62); Los Angeles, California, U.S.
- Listed height: 5 ft 10 in (1.78 m)
- Listed weight: 190 lb (86 kg)

Career information
- High school: Manual Arts
- College: Iowa State
- NFL draft: 1987: undrafted

Career history
- Houston Oilers (1987); Tampa Bay Buccaneers (1988)*
- * Offseason or practice squad member only

Career NFL statistics
- Rushing yards: 232
- Rushing average: 3.9
- Touchdowns: 1
- Stats at Pro Football Reference

Andrew Jackson (born May 6, 1964) is an American former professional football player who played running back for the Houston Oilers.
