= Donovan Small =

American football player (born 1964)

No. 27
- Position: Defensive back

Personal information
- Born: July 10, 1964 (age 62); Kingston, Jamaica
- Listed height: 5 ft 11 in (1.80 m)
- Listed weight: 190 lb (86 kg)

Career information
- High school: Wheeling
- College: Minnesota
- NFL draft: 1987: undrafted

Career history
- Houston Oilers (1987)

Career NFL statistics
- Interceptions: 1
- Stats at Pro Football Reference

Donovan Oliver Small (born July 10, 1964) is a Jamaican-born former professional football defensive back who played for the Houston Oilers of the National Football League (NFL). He played college football at University of Minnesota.
