= Herman Hunter =

American football player (born 1961)

No. 36, 30
- Position: Running back

Personal information
- Born: February 14, 1961 (age 65); Columbus, Georgia, U.S.
- Listed height: 6 ft 1 in (1.85 m)
- Listed weight: 197 lb (89 kg)

Career information
- High school: Hardaway (Columbus)
- College: Tennessee State
- NFL draft: 1985: 11th round, 289th overall pick

Career history
- Philadelphia Eagles (1985); Detroit Lions (1986); Houston Oilers (1987)

Career NFL statistics
- Rushing yards: 287
- Rushing average: 4.5
- Receptions: 56
- Receiving yards: 640
- Total touchdowns: 3
- Stats at Pro Football Reference

Herman James Hunter (born February 14, 1961) is an American former professional football player who was a running back in the National Football League (NFL) for the Philadelphia Eagles, Detroit Lions, and Houston Oilers. He played college football for the Tennessee State Tigers. Hunter was selected by the Eagles in the 11th round of the 1985 NFL draft. He was a co-leader for most kickoff return yards during the 1986 NFL season with 1,007 yards.
