= Larry Joyner =

American football player (born 1964)

No. 25
- Position: Safety

Personal information
- Born: January 22, 1964 (age 62); Memphis, Tennessee, U.S.
- Listed height: 6 ft 0 in (1.83 m)
- Listed weight: 207 lb (94 kg)

Career information
- High school: Hamilton (Memphis)
- College: Minnesota
- NFL draft: 1987: undrafted

Career history
- Houston Oilers (1987)

Awards and highlights
- Second-team All-Big Ten (1986)
- Stats at Pro Football Reference

Larry Joyner Jr. (born January 22, 1964) is an American former professional football player who was a safety for the Houston Oilers of the National Football League (NFL). He played college football for the Minnesota Golden Gophers.
