= Vince Stroth =

American football player (born 1960)

No. 60, 68, 75
- Positions: Tackle, guard

Personal information
- Born: November 25, 1960 (age 65); San Jose, California
- Listed height: 6 ft 4 in (1.93 m)
- Listed weight: 267 lb (121 kg)

Career information
- High school: San Jose (CA) Bellarmine Preparatory
- College: BYU

Career history
- Arizona Wranglers (1983); Chicago Blitz (1984); New Jersey Generals (1985); San Francisco 49ers (1985); Houston Oilers (1987–1988)
- Stats at Pro Football Reference

Vince Stroth (born November 25, 1960) is an American former football tackle and guard. He played for the Arizona Wranglers in 1983, the Chicago Blitz in 1984, the New Jersey Generals and San Francisco 49ers in 1985 and for the Houston Oilers from 1987 to 1988.
