= John Diettrich =

American football player (born 1963)

No. 9
- Position: Placekicker

Personal information
- Born: May 9, 1963 (age 63); Fort Wayne, Indiana, U.S.
- Listed height: 6 ft 2 in (1.88 m)
- Listed weight: 190 lb (86 kg)

Career information
- High school: Homestead (Ft. Wayne)
- College: Ball State
- NFL draft: 1987: undrafted

Career history
- Green Bay Packers (1987)*; Houston Oilers (1987); Buffalo Bills (1987); Phoenix Cardinals (1988)*; Fort Wayne Freedom (2003-04)
- * Offseason or practice squad member only

Awards and highlights
- Third-team All-American (1986); Second-team All-American (1985); 2004 NIFL North Division All-Star

Career NFL statistics
- Field goals made: 6
- Field goal attempts: 6
- Field goal %: 100.0
- Longest field goal: 45
- Stats at Pro Football Reference

John Michael Diettrich (born May 9, 1963) is an American former professional football player who was a kicker in the National Football League (NFL).

Diettrich was born and raised in Fort Wayne, Indiana and played scholastically at Homestead High School.

He played college football at Ball State University. As a junior he led the nation in field goals, with 25, and as a senior he had a field goal of 62 yards, the longest in the nation. Both years he was honored with All-America selections.

Pre-draft measurables
Height	Weight	Arm length	Hand span	Bench press
6 ft 0 3/4 in (1.85 m)	194 lb (88 kg)	30 1/4 in (0.77 m)	9 3/4 in (0.25 m)	1 reps
All values from NFL Combine

Diettrich signed with the Green Bay Packers as an undrafted free agent in 1987, but left their training camp after struggling to make the adjustment to kicking extra points and field goals without a tee.

Diettrich joined the Houston Oilers as a replacement player during the 1987 NFLPA strike, He performed well, going 5 for 5 on extra points and 6 for 6 on field goals, but was released when the strike ended.

In 1997, he was named to the Ball State Hall of Fame.

In 2003–04, Diettrich made a return to professional football, playing for the Fort Wayne Freedom of the National Indoor Football League. Over the two seasons he played in 29 games and was named an All-Star in 2004.
