= Paul Vogel (American football) =

American football player (born 1961)

No. 50
- Position: Linebacker

Personal information
- Born: February 2, 1961 (age 65); New York, New York, U.S.
- Listed height: 6 ft 1 in (1.85 m)
- Listed weight: 200 lb (91 kg)

Career information
- High school: Eastside (Taylors, South Carolina)
- College: South Carolina
- NFL draft: 1985: undrafted

Career history
- Tampa Bay Buccaneers (1985–1986)*; Miami Dolphins (1987)*; Houston Oilers (1987)
- * Offseason or practice squad member only

Awards and highlights
- Second-team All-South Independent (1984)

Career NFL statistics
- Games played: 1
- Stats at Pro Football Reference

Paul Richard Vogel (born February 2, 1961) is an American former professional football player who was a linebacker for the Houston Oilers of the National Football League (NFL). He played college football for the South Carolina Gamecocks.
