= Barry Pettyjohn =

American football player (born 1964)

No. 77
- Position: Tackle

Personal information
- Born: March 29, 1964 (age 62); Cincinnati, Ohio, U.S.
- Listed height: 6 ft 5 in (1.96 m)
- Listed weight: 285 lb (129 kg)

Career information
- High school: Deer Park
- College: Pittsburgh
- NFL draft: 1986: undrafted

Career history
- Tampa Bay Buccaneers (1986)*; Houston Oilers (1987); Atlanta Falcons (1988)*; Miami Dolphins (1989–1990)*
- * Offseason or practice squad member only
- Stats at Pro Football Reference

Barry Glen Pettyjohn (born March 29, 1964) is an American former professional football player who was a tackle for the Houston Oilers of National Football League (NFL). He played college football for the Pittsburgh Panthers. He later was a football coach.
