= Mike Davis (defensive back, born 1972) =

American football player (born 1972)

No. 30, 26
- Position: Defensive back

Personal information
- Born: January 14, 1972 (age 54); Springfield, Ohio, U.S.
- Listed height: 6 ft 1 in (1.85 m)
- Listed weight: 195 lb (88 kg)

Career information
- High school: Springfield North
- College: Cincinnati
- NFL draft: 1994: 4th round, 119th overall pick
- Expansion draft: 1995: 15th round, 29th overall pick

Career history
- Houston Oilers (1994); Jacksonville Jaguars (1995)*; Cleveland Browns (1995); Philadelphia Eagles (1996)*
- * Offseason or practice squad member only

Career NFL statistics
- Tackles: 2
- Stats at Pro Football Reference

Michael Allen Davis (born January 14, 1972) is an American former professional football player who was a defensive back for the Houston Oilers and the Cleveland Browns of the National Football League (NFL). He was selected by the Oilers in the fourth round of the 1994 NFL draft with the 119th overall pick. He played college football for the Cincinnati Bearcats.
