= Ira Valentine =

American football player (1963–2022)

- Valentine while at Texas A&M

No. 45
- Position: Running back

Personal information
- Born: June 4, 1963; Marshall, Texas, U.S.
- Died: July 6, 2022 (aged 59)
- Listed height: 6 ft 0 in (1.83 m)
- Listed weight: 212 lb (96 kg)

Career information
- High school: Marshall
- College: Texas A&M
- NFL draft: 1987: 12th round, 314th overall pick

Career history
- Houston Oilers (1987–1988); Tampa Bay Buccaneers (1989)*
- * Offseason or practice squad member only

Career NFL statistics
- Rushing yards: 10
- Rushing average: 2.0
- Receptions: 2
- Receiving yards: 10
- Stats at Pro Football Reference

Ira Lynn Valentine (June 4, 1963 – July 6, 2022) was an American professional football player who was a running back one season in the National Football League (NFL) for the Houston Oilers. He played college football for the Texas A&M Aggies and also had a stint with the Tampa Bay Buccaneers.

== Early life and education ==
Valentine was born on June 4, 1963, in Marshall, Texas, to Maudell and Ira Valentine. He attended Marshall High School and played football. He played on defense for his first three seasons, only seeing time as a running back in his senior year. As a senior, Valentine ran 174 times for 858 yards (a 4.9 yard average) and scored nine touchdowns.

After graduating from high school, Valentine committed to Texas A&M University, joining two of his former Marshall teammates. He was the first Marshall player to sign a letter-of-intent in 1982, signing at 8 a.m. on February 10, the earliest possible time. For his first season at the school, he played on the junior varsity football team.

Valentine made the varsity roster in 1983 as the backup fullback. However, he suffered an injury and did not play. In 1984, Valentine played as a reserve fullback and return specialist. Valentine saw his first "extensive playing time" in 1985 and was the team's top blocking back. He scored his first career touchdown in a 43–16 win over Houston in week five and scored a key two-point conversion in the Aggies' 28–27 win versus the Texas Tech Red Raiders two weeks earlier.

Valentine saw more time as a ball-carrier in 1986 due to the departure of Anthony Toney. He finished his college career with 101 touches for 486 yards and six touchdowns.

== Professional career ==
Valentine was selected in the 12th round (314th overall) of the 1987 NFL draft by the Houston Oilers. "Ira was the fastest player at his position still available when it came our turn," said Oilers' head coach Jerry Glanville, as Valentine had run a 4.40 second 40-yard dash in college. "That's what we look for in our 12th round pick ... the fastest player available at his position." He reported to camp at the beginning of May. He was officially signed by the team in mid-July. In two preseason games against the Indianapolis Colts, Valentine ran for 65 yards on 15 carries. He survived the final roster cuts on September 7 and made his NFL debut in week one against the Los Angeles Rams, in a 20–16 win.

Valentine did not play again until week ten, a 23–3 win at the Pittsburgh Steelers. In the game, he recorded three rush attempts for five yards as well as two receptions for 10 yards. He also appeared in five other games: week eleven, a 7–40 loss versus the Cleveland Browns; week twelve, a 27–51 loss at the Indianapolis Colts; week thirteen, a 33–18 win over the San Diego Chargers, in which he recorded two rushes for five yards; week fourteen, a 10–24 loss at the New Orleans Saints; and week sixteen, a 21–17 win over the Cincinnati Bengals, in which he recorded one kickoff return for 13 yards. He also appeared in two playoff games, in a win over the Seattle Seahawks and in a loss to the Denver Broncos. Valentine finished the season with five rushes for 10 yards, two catches for 10 yards, and one kickoff return for 13 yards for a total of 33 all-purpose yards. He appeared in seven total games as well as two playoff games.

Valentine entered the 1988 season competing with Alonzo Highsmith, Mike Rozier, Lorenzo White, Allen Pinkett, Spencer Tillman, and Ray Wallace for the starting running back job. He was released at the final roster cuts in August.

Valentine received a tryout with the St. Louis Cardinals in October 1988, but was not signed. In January 1989, he signed a two-year contract with the Tampa Bay Buccaneers. He was released at the final roster cuts in August and did not sign another NFL contract afterwards.

== Later life and death ==
Valentine returned to East Texas, where he grew up, after his football career ended and worked at a forging plant. He died July 6, 2022, at the age of 59, from a heart attack.
