= Steve Superick =

American football player (born 1963)

No. 8
- Position: Punter

Personal information
- Born: August 9, 1963 (age 63); Memphis, Tennessee, U.S.
- Listed height: 5 ft 11 in (1.80 m)
- Listed weight: 204 lb (93 kg)

Career information
- High school: North Brunswick (Leland, North Carolina)
- College: West Virginia
- NFL draft: 1986: undrafted

Career history
- Pittsburgh Steelers (1986)*; Houston Oilers (1987)
- * Offseason or practice squad member only

Awards and highlights
- First-team All-East (1984)

Career NFL statistics
- Games played: 2
- Stats at Pro Football Reference

Stephen Michael Superick (born August 9, 1963) is an American former professional football player who was a punter for two games with the Houston Oilers of the National Football League (NFL) in 1987. He played college football for the West Virginia Mountaineers.
