= Jim Reid (offensive lineman) =

American football player (born 1971)

No. 67
- Positions: Guard, Tackle

Personal information
- Born: February 13, 1971 (age 55); Newport News, Virginia, U.S.
- Listed height: 6 ft 6 in (1.98 m)
- Listed weight: 306 lb (139 kg)

Career information
- High school: Hampton Roads Academy (Newport News)
- College: Virginia (1989–1993)
- NFL draft: 1994: 5th round, 161st overall pick

Career history
- Houston Oilers (1994–1996); → Amsterdam Admirals (1995)*
- * Offseason or practice squad member only

Awards and highlights
- First-team All-ACC (1993)

Career NFL statistics
- Games played: 6
- Stats at Pro Football Reference

James Varrett Reid (born February 13, 1971) is an American former professional football player who was a guard and tackle for the Houston Oilers of the National Football League (NFL). He played college football for the Virginia Cavaliers.

== Early life ==
Reid was born on February 13, 1971, in Newport News, Virginia. He attended Hampton Roads Academy in Newport News.

== College career ==
Reid played college football for the Virginia Cavaliers from 1989 to 1993 and was a four-year letterman from 1990 to 1993. He redshirted his first season and became a four-year starter on the offensive line. As a senior, Reid earned first-team All-Atlantic Coast Conference honors.

== Professional career ==
=== Houston Oilers ===
Reid was selected in the fifth round, with the 161st overall selection, by the Houston Oilers in the 1994 NFL draft. On June 15, he signed his rookie contract with the team. Reid did not play in his first season but played in six games in 1995 at tackle. On August 20, 1996, he was placed on the injured reserve with a knee injury. Reid became a free agent at the end of the season.

=== Amsterdam Admirals ===
On February 20, 1995, Reid was allocated to the Amsterdam Admirals of the World League of American Football (WLAF). However, he did not play a game for the team.
