= Toby Caston =

American football player (1965–1994)

No. 90, 56, 50
- Position: Linebacker

Personal information
- Born: July 17, 1965; Monroe, Louisiana, U.S.
- Died: October 2, 1994 (aged 29); Garland, Texas, U.S.
- Listed height: 6 ft 1 in (1.85 m)
- Listed weight: 235 lb (107 kg)

Career information
- High school: Neville (Monroe, Louisiana)
- College: LSU
- NFL draft: 1987: 6th round, 159th overall pick

Career history
- Houston Oilers (1987–1988); Detroit Lions (1989–1993)

Awards and highlights
- Second-team All-SEC (1986)

Career NFL statistics
- Fumble recoveries: 1
- Stats at Pro Football Reference

Sebastian Tobias "Toby" Caston (July 17, 1965 – October 2, 1994) was an American professional football player who played linebacker in the National Football League (NFL) for seven seasons for the Houston Oilers and Detroit Lions. He was selected by the Oilers in the sixth round of the 1987 NFL draft with the 159th overall pick. He played college football at Louisiana State University for the LSU Tigers football team. He was killed in a road accident.

Pre-draft measurables
Height	Weight	Arm length	Hand span	40-yard dash	10-yard split	20-yard split	20-yard shuttle	Vertical jump	Broad jump	Bench press
6 ft 1 in (1.85 m)	235 lb (107 kg)	31 3/4 in (0.81 m)	9 1/2 in (0.24 m)	4.82 s	1.64 s	2.77 s	4.55 s	32.5 in (0.83 m)	9 ft 9 in (2.97 m)	10 reps
All values from NFL Combine
