= Jeremy Nunley =

American football player (1971–2018)

No. 73, 93
- Position: Defensive end

Personal information
- Born: September 19, 1971; Winchester, Tennessee, U.S.
- Died: February 5, 2018 (aged 46); Tuscaloosa, Alabama, U.S.
- Listed height: 6 ft 6 in (1.98 m)
- Listed weight: 278 lb (126 kg)

Career information
- High school: Winchester (TN) Franklin Co.
- College: Alabama
- NFL draft: 1994: 2nd round, 60th overall pick

Career history
- Houston Oilers (1994–1995); Carolina Panthers (1995); St. Louis Rams (1997)*
- * Offseason or practice squad member only

Awards and highlights
- National champion (1992); First-team All-SEC (1993)
- Stats at Pro Football Reference

Jody Jeremy Nunley (September 19, 1971 – February 5, 2018) was an American professional football defensive tackle. After a college career at Alabama, he spent three seasons in the National Football League (NFL). He was selected by the Houston Oilers in the second round of the 1994 NFL draft with the 60th overall pick.

== Personal life and death ==
Nunley was born to Jody and Edith Nunley in Tullahoma, Tennessee on September 19, 1971. Nunley was a national champion athlete at the University of Alabama and a professional football player in the National Football League. Nunley had two daughters, Karsyn and Raegan, who both attended the University of Alabama, with his wife, Marti Watson, who was a student-athlete on the 1991 National Championship Gymnastics team.

Nunley died suddenly of unknown causes at his home on February 5, 2018, at the age of 46.
