= Oliver Williams (American football) =

American football player (born 1960)

No. 87, 86
- Position: Wide receiver

Personal information
- Born: October 17, 1960 (age 66); Chicago, Illinois, U.S.
- Listed height: 6 ft 3 in (1.91 m)
- Listed weight: 194 lb (88 kg)

Career information
- High school: Junípero Serra (Gardena, California)
- College: Illinois
- NFL draft: 1983: 12th round, 313th overall pick

Career history
- Chicago Bears (1983); Chicago Blitz (1984)*; St. Louis Cardinals (1984)*; San Antonio Gunslingers (1985); Indianapolis Colts (1985–1986); Houston Oilers (1987)
- * Offseason or practice squad member only

Awards and highlights
- Second-team All-Big Ten (1981)

Career NFL statistics
- Receptions: 20
- Receiving yards: 340
- Receiving touchdowns: 2
- Stats at Pro Football Reference

Oliver Williams (born October 17, 1960) is an American former professional football player who was a wide receiver who played in the National Football League (NFL). He played college football for the Illinois Fighting Illini.

== College career ==
Williams began his collegiate career at Los Angeles Harbor College, where he played for two years before transferring to the University of Illinois Urbana-Champaign. He became a starter going into his first season with the Fighting Illini and was named second-team All-Big Ten Conference after catching 38 passes for 760 yards and six touchdowns. As a senior he had 35 receptions for 523 yards and six touchdowns. After his senior season Williams played in the Shrine Bowl.

== Professional career ==
Williams was selected by the Chicago Bears in the 12th round of the 1983 NFL draft and spent his rookie season on injured reserve. He was released by the Bears at the end of the season and was signed by Chicago Blitz of the United States Football League, who released him a few months later. Williams was then signed by the St. Louis Cardinals, but was cut during training camp. He was signed by the San Antonio Gunslingers of the USFL in 1985 and was later signed by the Indianapolis Colts. Williams began the season on injured reserve and played in the final eight games of the season, catching nine passes for 175 yards and one touchdown. He played in three games for the Colts in 1986. Williams was signed by the Houston Oilers in October 1987 as a replacement player during the 1987 NFL players strike. He had 11 receptions for 165 yards and one touchdown in three games and was released when the strike ended.

== Personal life ==
Williams is the older brother of NFL receiver David Williams.
