= Ricky Moore (American football) =

American football player (born 1963)

No. 42, 32, 37
- Position: Running back

Personal information
- Born: April 7, 1963 (age 63); Huntsville, Alabama, U.S.
- Listed height: 5 ft 11 in (1.80 m)
- Listed weight: 237 lb (108 kg)

Career information
- High school: Huntsvillel (AL) Lee
- College: Alabama
- NFL draft: 1985: 3rd round, 75th overall pick

Career history
- San Francisco 49ers (1985)*; Buffalo Bills (1986); Green Bay Packers (1987)*; Houston Oilers (1987); Phoenix Cardinals (1988)
- * Offseason or practice squad member only

Awards and highlights
- First-team All-SEC (1983)

Career NFL statistics
- Rushing yards: 126
- Rushing average: 3.2
- Touchdowns: 1
- Stats at Pro Football Reference

Ricky Delano Moore (born April 7, 1963) is an American former professional football player who was a running back in the National Football League (NFL). He was selected by the San Francisco 49ers in the third round of the 1985 NFL draft with the 75th overall pick and also played for the Buffalo Bills, Houston Oilers and Phoenix Cardinals. He played college football for the Alabama Crimson Tide.
