= Robert Banks (American football) =

American football player (born 1963)

No. 97
- Position: Defensive end

Personal information
- Born: December 10, 1963 (age 62); Williamsburg, Virginia, U.S.
- Listed height: 6 ft 5 in (1.96 m)
- Listed weight: 254 lb (115 kg)

Career information
- High school: Hampton (Hampton, Virginia)
- College: Notre Dame
- NFL draft: 1987: 7th round, 176th overall pick

Career history
- Houston Oilers (1987–1988); Cleveland Browns (1989–1990); Houston Oilers (1991)*; Saskatchewan Roughriders (1992)
- * Offseason or practice squad member only

Career NFL statistics
- Sacks: 4
- Fumble recoveries: 2
- Stats at Pro Football Reference

Robert Nathan Banks (born December 10, 1963) is an American former professional football player who was a defensive end in the National Football League (NFL). He played college football for the Notre Dame Fighting Irish.

Born in Williamsburg, Virginia, Banks attended Peninsula Catholic High School before transferring to Hampton High School in Hampton, Virginia, to play football. In 1982, the Touchdown Club of Columbus awarded Banks their second annual Sam B. Nicola Trophy, designating him as the National High School Player of the Year. Banks played for University of Notre Dame in the mid-1980s. He was selected by the Houston Oilers football team in the 7th round (176th overall) of the 1987 NFL draft. He played off the bench for one year in Houston before moving to the Cleveland Browns, where he started 15 games in 1989. He started 9 of the 15 games he played in 1990, which was his last year in the NFL.

Pre-draft measurables
Height	Weight	Arm length	Hand span	40-yard dash	10-yard split	20-yard split	Bench press
6 ft 4 in (1.93 m)	250 lb (113 kg)	31 1/2 in (0.80 m)	8 1/2 in (0.22 m)	4.98 s	1.75 s	2.89 s	18 reps
All values from NFL Combine

As of 2016, he is the campus director of admissions for the Houston campus of the Aviation Institute of Maintenance.
