= Rayford Cooks =

American gridiron football player (born 1962)

No. 98
- Position: Defensive end

Personal information
- Born: August 25, 1962 (age 64); Dallas, Texas, U.S.
- Listed height: 6 ft 3 in (1.91 m)
- Listed weight: 245 lb (111 kg)

Career information
- High school: L. G. Pinkston (Dallas)
- College: North Texas
- NFL draft: 1984: undrafted

Career history
- Houston Gamblers (1984–1985); Montreal Alouettes (1986); Houston Oilers (1987); BC Lions (1989)
- Stats at Pro Football Reference

Rayford Cooks (born August 25, 1962) is an American former professional football player who was a defensive end for the Houston Oilers of the National Football League (NFL) in 1987. He played college football for the North Texas Mean Green.
