= Doug Kellermeyer =

American football player (born 1961)

No. 60, 62
- Position: Offensive tackle

Personal information
- Born: June 1, 1961 (age 65); Bucyrus, Ohio, U.S.
- Listed height: 6 ft 3 in (1.91 m)
- Listed weight: 275 lb (125 kg)

Career information
- High school: Coronado (Scottsdale, Arizona)
- College: BYU
- NFL draft: 1984: undrafted

Career history
- Los Angeles Raiders (1984)*; Houston Oilers (1984–1985)*; New Jersey Generals (1986)*; Houston Oilers (1987)
- * Offseason or practice squad member only

Awards and highlights
- Second-team All-WAC (1983)

Career NFL statistics
- Games played: 3
- Stats at Pro Football Reference

Douglas Arthur Kellermeyer (born June 1, 1961) is an American former professional football player who was a tackle for three games with the Houston Oilers of the National Football League (NFL) in 1987. He played college football for the BYU Cougars.
