= Doug Williams (offensive lineman) =

American football player (born 1962)

No. 69, 75
- Positions: Tackle, guard

Personal information
- Born: October 1, 1962 (age 64); Cincinnati, Ohio, U.S.
- Listed height: 6 ft 5 in (1.96 m)
- Listed weight: 286 lb (130 kg)

Career information
- High school: Archbishop Moeller (OH)
- College: Kentucky; Texas A&M
- NFL draft: 1986: 2nd round, 49th overall pick

Career history
- New York Jets (1986)*; Houston Oilers (1986–1988); Seattle Seahawks (1989)*; Houston Oilers (1990)*; San Antonio Riders (1992)
- * Offseason or practice squad member only

Awards and highlights
- Second-team All-American (1985)

Career NFL statistics
- Games played: 23
- Games started: 9
- Stats at Pro Football Reference

Douglas Williams (born October 1, 1962) is an American former professional football player who was an offensive lineman in the National Football League (NFL) and the World League of American Football (WLAF).

Williams was born and raised in Cincinnati, Ohio and played scholastically for Archbishop Moeller High School.

He began his college football career at the University of Kentucky, before transferring to Texas A&M. He earned second-team All-America honors as a senior.

Williams was selected by the New York Jets in the second round of the 1986 NFL draft.

Williams was with the Houston Oilers (NFL) for three seasons (1986-1988), but spent his third year on the injured reserve list. He returned to professional football after a three-year absence to join the San Antonio Riders of the WLAF in 1992.

== Personal life ==
Married Carolyn Crisp Williams, 2 daughters Cassady Williams, Riley Williams.
