= Jeff Parks =

American football player (born 1964)

No. 89, 85
- Position: Tight end

Personal information
- Born: September 14, 1964 (age 62); Columbia, South Carolina, U.S.
- Listed height: 6 ft 4 in (1.93 m)
- Listed weight: 238 lb (108 kg)

Career information
- High school: Gardendale (Gardendale, Alabama)
- College: Auburn
- NFL draft: 1986: 5th round, 114th overall pick

Career history
- Houston Oilers (1986–1987); Green Bay Packers (1988); Tampa Bay Buccaneers (1988); Tampa Bay Buccaneers (1990)*
- * Offseason or practice squad member only

Awards and highlights
- National champion (1983); Second-team All-SEC (1984)
- Stats at Pro Football Reference

Jeffrey Dupree Parks (born September 14, 1964) is an American former professional football tight end who played in the National Football League (NFL) with the Houston Oilers and Tampa Bay Buccaneers. He played college football for the Auburn Tigers and was selected by the Oilers in the fifth round of the 1986 NFL draft.

== Early life ==
Jeffrey Dupree Parks was born on September 14, 1964, in Columbia, South Carolina. He attended Gardendale High School in Gardendale, Alabama.

== College career ==
Parks enrolled at Auburn University to play college football for the Tigers. He was a four-year letterman from 1982 to 1985. He backed up Ed West early in his career. The 1983 Tigers were named national champions by multiple selectors. Parks split time with Ron Middleton in 1984, earning Associated Press second-team All-SEC honors. Parks played in 45 career games, catching 34 passes for 401 yards and two touchdown.

== Professional career ==
Parks was selected by the Houston Oilers in the fifth round, with the 114th overall pick, of the 1986 NFL draft. He signed with the team on July 23. He played in the first five games of the 1986 season as a reserve tight end and did not record any statistics before being placed on injured reserve on October 8. Parks was placed on injured reserve again on September 6, 1987, before the start of the 1987 season. He was activated on November 14, 1987, appearing in the final seven regular season games and also two playoff games. He was released on August 30, 1988, after the fourth game of the 1988 preseason.

Parks signed with the Green Bay Packers on September 6, 1988, and was placed on injured reserve the same day. He was released on September 26, 1988.

Parks was signed by the Tampa Bay Buccaneers on November 30, 1988. He played in the final three games of the season for the Buccaneers, starting once in place of Calvin Magee, while catching one pass for 22 yards on three targets. Parks retired in July 1989. He later re-signed with Tampa Bay on March 27, 1990, but was released on July 23, 1990.
