= Larry Smith (linebacker) =

American football player (born 1965)

No. 54
- Position: Linebacker

Personal information
- Born: February 7, 1965 (age 61)
- Listed height: 6 ft 1 in (1.85 m)
- Listed weight: 210 lb (95 kg)

Career information
- High school: Washington County
- College: Kentucky
- NFL draft: 1987: undrafted

Career history
- Dallas Cowboys (1987)*; Houston Oilers (1987)
- * Offseason or practice squad member only
- Stats at Pro Football Reference

Lawrence Abell Smith (born February 7, 1965) is an American former professional football linebacker who played for the Houston Oilers of the National Football League (NFL). He played college football at the University of Kentucky.
