= Mark Gehring =

American football player (born 1964)

No. 86, 88
- Position: Tight end

Personal information
- Born: April 16, 1964 (age 62); Burien, Washington, U.S.
- Listed height: 6 ft 4 in (1.93 m)
- Listed weight: 235 lb (107 kg)

Career information
- High school: Mount Rainier
- College: Eastern Washington
- NFL draft: 1986: undrafted

Career history
- Minnesota Vikings (1986)*; Calgary Stampeders (1987); Houston Oilers (1986–1987); Washington Redskins (1988)*
- * Offseason or practice squad member only

Career NFL statistics
- Receptions: 5
- Receiving yards: 64
- Touchdowns: 1
- Stats at Pro Football Reference

Mark Gehring (born April 16, 1964) is an American former professional football player who was a tight end for the Houston Oilers of the National Football League (NFL). He played college football for the Eastern Washington Eagles.
