= Eugene Seale =

American football player (born 1964)

No. 51, 53
- Position: Linebacker

Personal information
- Born: June 3, 1964 (age 62); Jasper, Texas, U.S.
- Listed height: 5 ft 10 in (1.78 m)
- Listed weight: 250 lb (113 kg)

Career information
- High school: Jasper
- College: Lamar
- NFL draft: 1987: undrafted

Career history
- Houston Oilers (1987–1992)

Career NFL statistics
- Sacks: 2
- Interceptions: 2
- Touchdowns: 2
- Stats at Pro Football Reference

Eugene Seale, Jr. (born June 3, 1964) is an American former professional football player who was a linebacker for the Houston Oilers of the National Football League (NFL) from 1987 to 1992. He played college football for the Lamar Cardinals.

In college, Seale played at Lamar University for the Cardinals, a team with a terrible win–loss record, even during his tenure, but not for lack of skill or effort on his part. Seale was the most decorated player in Lamar University history and is widely considered the best linebacker the team ever had. He set the record for most tackles with 500 in three seasons, and in 1983 alone, he had 180 tackles. However, Seale is probably best remembered for the first game he played, where he intercepted a pass and ran it back 52 yards for a touchdown. Seale was the Southland Conference’s Defensive Player of the Year in 1983, and received the League's player of the week award five times. He was inducted into the Cardinal Hall of Honor in 1991 and was considered a Lamar Legend . Seale also excelled at both shot put and discus, leading the Cardinals to three successive SLC title wins.

Standing at only 5 feet 10 inches (1.78 m), with 6 feet 2 inches (1.88 m) being average height for NFL players, Seale had difficulty even being allowed into player tryouts for the Houston Oilers, the team closest to his hometown. After turning down a free agent contract from the Chicago Bears and being drafted by the New Jersey Generals of the USFL, just before the league folded, Seale joined the British Columbia Lions of the Canadian Football League briefly, then was cut. He gave up his dream and was working as a construction worker when everything changed.

During the football strike of 1987, new players who had previously been cut, or not allowed to try out, got a chance to be pro football players, if only for a short time. Of those hastily hired replacements that played during the 1987 season, most were cut during training camp the next season, including Seale. However, coach Jerry Glanville did not want to lose him and called Seale back after a few other players suffered injuries. On special teams and as a backup linebacker, Seale proved that his height did not stop him from being an outstanding player. Seale went on to play five more seasons for the Oilers until 1992.

In Seale's first NFL game for the Oilers, he intercepted a pass and ran it back 72 yards for a touchdown. This led to a 40–10 victory over the Denver Broncos. Against Cincinnati, Seale intercepted a pass from Boomer Esiason intended for Tim McGee and ran 45 yards before being tackled.
