= Craig Birdsong =

American football player (born 1964)

No. 21
- Position: Defensive back

Personal information
- Born: August 16, 1964 (age 62); Kaufman, Texas, U.S.
- Listed height: 6 ft 2 in (1.88 m)
- Listed weight: 217 lb (98 kg)

Career information
- High school: Kaufman
- College: North Texas
- NFL draft: 1987: undrafted

Career history
- Houston Oilers (1987–1988)
- Stats at Pro Football Reference

Gary Craig Birdsong (born August 16, 1964) is an American former professional football defensive back who played for the Houston Oilers of the National Football League (NFL). He played college football at University of North Texas.

While a member of the Oilers, Birdsong was also a wrestler for the Universal Wrestling Federation.
