= List of NFL players (Smi–Sz) =

This is a list of players who have appeared in at least one regular season or postseason game in the National Football League (NFL), American Football League (AFL), or All-America Football Conference (AAFC) and have a last name that falls between "Smi" and "Sz". For the rest of the S's, see list of NFL players (Sa–Sme). This list is accurate through the end of the 2025 NFL season.

== Smi–Smy ==
- Dave Smigelsky
- Branko Smilanich
- Justin Smiley
- Tom Smiley
- Aaron Smith (born 1962)
- Aaron Smith (born 1976)
- Ainias Smith
- Akili Smith
- Al Smith
- Aldon Smith
- Alex Smith (born 1982)
- Alex Smith (born 1984)
- Alfonso Smith
- Allen Smith (born 1922)
- Allen Smith (born October 7, 1942)
- Allen Smith (born November 20, 1942)
- Alphonso Smith
- Andre Smith (born 1987)
- Andre Smith (born 1988)
- Andre Smith (born 1997)
- Anthony Smith (born 1967)
- Anthony Smith (born 1983)
- Antone Smith
- Antonio Smith
- Antowain Smith
- Arian Smith
- Armond Smith
- Art Smith
- Artie Smith
- Barry Smith
- Barty Smith
- Ben Smith (born 1911)
- Ben Smith (born 1967)
- Bill Smith (born 1912)
- Bill Smith (born 1926)
- Billy Ray Smith Jr.
- Billy Ray Smith Sr.
- Blane Smith
- Bob Smith (born 1925)
- Bob Smith (born 1929)
- Bob Smith (born 1933)
- Bob Smith (born 1945)
- Bobby Smith (born 1938)
- Bobby Smith (born 1942)
- Brad Smith (born 1969)
- Brad Smith (born 1983)
- Braden Smith
- Brady Smith
- Brandon Smith (born 1987)
- Brandon Smith (born 1998)
- Brandon Smith (born 2001)
- Brashard Smith
- Brent Smith
- Brian Smith (born 1966)
- Brian Smith (born 1989)
- Bruce Smith (born 1920)
- Bruce Smith (born 1963)
- Bryan Smith
- Bubba Smith
- Byron Smith
- Cam Smith
- Cameron Smith
- Carl Smith
- Cedric Smith
- Charles Smith
- Charlie Smith (born 1933)
- Charlie Smith (born 1946)
- Charlie Smith (born 1950)
- Chris Smith (born 1963)
- Chris Smith (born 1987)
- Chris Smith (born 1992)
- Chris Smith (born 1999)
- Chris Smith II
- Chuck Smith
- C. J. Smith
- Clifton Smith (born 1980)
- Clifton Smith (born 1985)
- Clyde Smith
- Corey Smith
- Dallis Smith
- Dan Smith
- D'Ante Smith
- D'Anthony Smith
- Darrin Smith
- Daryl Smith (born 1963)
- Daryl Smith (born 1982)
- Daryle Smith
- Dave Smith (born 1937)
- Dave Smith (born May 18, 1947)
- Dave Smith (born December 9, 1947)
- Dave Smith (born 1964)
- DeAngelo Smith
- Dennis Smith (born 1959)
- Dennis Smith (born 1967)
- Derek Smith
- Derron Smith
- Detron Smith
- De'Veon Smith
- Devin Smith
- DeVonta Smith
- Dick Smith (born 1912)
- Dick Smith (born 1944)
- D. J. Smith
- D'Joun Smith
- Don Smith (born ?)
- Don Smith (born 1943)
- Don Smith (born 1957)
- Don Smith (born 1963)
- Donald Smith
- Donnell Smith
- Donovan Smith
- Doug Smith (born 1956)
- Doug Smith (born 1960)
- Doug Smith (born 1963)
- Dreamius Smith
- Dwight Smith
- Ed Smith (born 1913)
- Ed Smith (born 1923)
- Ed Smith (born 1950)
- Ed Smith (born 1957)
- Ed Smith (born 1969)
- Elerson Smith
- Elliot Smith
- Emanuel Smith
- Emmanuel Smith
- Emmitt Smith
- Eric Smith (born 1959)
- Eric Smith (born 1971)
- Eric Smith (born 1983)
- Eric Smith (born 1995)
- Ernie Smith (born 1909)
- Ernie Smith (born 1930)
- Fernando Smith
- Fletcher Smith
- Frankie Smith
- Franky Smith
- Garrison Smith
- Gary Smith
- Gaylon Smith
- Gene Smith
- Geno Smith
- George Smith (born 1914)
- George Smith (born 1921)
- Gordon Smith
- Greg Smith
- Hal Smith
- Hank Smith
- Harrison Smith
- Harry Smith
- Hayden Smith
- Herman Smith
- Holden Smith
- Hugh Smith
- Hunter Smith
- Irv Smith Sr.
- Irv Smith Jr.
- Ito Smith
- J. D. Smith (born 1931)
- J. D. Smith (born May 27, 1936)
- J. D. Smith (born October 18, 1936)
- J. T. Smith
- Jack Smith (born 1917)
- Jack Smith (born 1947)
- Jackie Smith
- Jacquies Smith
- Jason Smith
- Jaylin Smith
- Jaylon Smith
- Jeff Smith (born 1943)
- Jeff Smith (born March 22, 1962)
- Jeff Smith (born May 4, 1962)
- Jeff Smith (born December 28, 1962)
- Jeff Smith (born 1973)
- Jeff Smith (born 1997)
- Jermaine Smith
- Jerome Smith
- Jerry Smith (born 1930)
- Jerry Smith (born 1943)
- Jim Smith (born 1922)
- Jim Smith (born 1946)
- Jim Smith (born 1955)
- Jim Ray Smith
- Jimmy Smith (born 1945)
- Jimmy Smith (born 1960)
- Jimmy Smith (born 1969)
- Jimmy Smith (born 1988)
- Joe Smith
- Joey Smith
- John Smith (born ?)
- John Smith (born 1949)
- John Smith (born 1956)
- Johnny Ray Smith
- Jonathan Smith
- Jonnu Smith
- Jordan Smith
- Justin Smith (born June 5, 1979)
- Justin Smith (born September 30, 1979)
- Kaden Smith
- Keidron Smith
- Keith Smith (born 1980)
- Keith Smith (born 1992)
- Kelvin Smith
- Ken Smith (born 1951)
- Ken Smith (born 1960)
- Kendal Smith
- Kenny Smith
- Kevin Smith (born 1967)
- Kevin Smith (born 1969)
- Kevin Smith (born 1970)
- Kevin Smith (born 1986)
- Kevin Smith (born 1991)
- Khreem Smith
- Kion Smith
- Kolby Smith
- Lamar Smith
- Lance Smith
- Larry Smith (born 1947)
- Larry Smith (born 1965)
- Larry Smith (born 1974)
- Laverne Smith
- Lawrence Smith
- Lecitus Smith
- Le Kevin Smith
- Lee Smith
- Len Smith
- Leonard Smith
- L. J. Smith
- Lucious Smith
- Lyman Smith
- Maason Smith
- Malcolm Smith
- Marcus Smith (born 1985)
- Marcus Smith (born 1992)
- Mark Smith
- Marquis Smith
- Marty Smith
- Marv Smith
- Marvel Smith
- Matt Smith
- Maurice Smith (born 1976)
- Maurice Smith (born 1995)
- Mazi Smith
- Michael Smith (born 1970)
- Michael Smith (born 1988)
- Mike Smith (born 1958)
- Mike Smith (born 1962)
- Mike Smith (born 1981)
- Milt Smith
- Monte Smith
- Musa Smith
- Neil Smith
- Nolan Smith
- Noland Smith
- Oak Smith
- Olin Smith
- Ollie Smith
- Omar Smith
- Onterrio Smith
- Orland Smith
- Oscar Smith
- Otis Smith
- Pat Smith
- Paul Smith (born 1945)
- Paul Smith (born 1978)
- Perry Smith
- Phil Smith
- Preston Smith
- Quanterus Smith
- Quintin Smith
- Ralph Smith
- Raonall Smith
- Rashad Smith
- Ray Smith
- Ray Gene Smith
- Red Smith
- Reggie Smith (born 1956)
- Reggie Smith (born 1961)
- Reggie Smith (born 1986)
- Rex Smith
- Richard Smith
- Ricky Smith
- Rico Smith
- Riley Smith
- Rob Smith
- Robaire Smith
- Robert Smith (born 1962)
- Robert Smith (born 1972)
- Rod Smith (born March 12, 1970)
- Rod Smith (born May 15, 1970)
- Rod Smith (born 1992)
- Rodney Smith (born 1990)
- Rodney Smith (born 1996)
- Ron Smith (born 1942)
- Ron Smith (born 1943)
- Ron Smith (born 1956)
- Ron Smith (born 1978)
- Roquan Smith
- Royce Smith
- Russ Smith (born 1895)
- Russ Smith (born 1944)
- Rusty Smith
- Ryan Smith
- Saivion Smith
- Sammie Smith
- Sean Smith (born 1965)
- Sean Smith (born 1967)
- Sean Smith (born 1987)
- Shane Smith
- Shaun Smith
- Shelley Smith
- Sherman Smith
- Shevin Smith
- Shi Smith
- Sid Smith
- Steve Smith (born 1944)
- Steve Smith (born 1964)
- Steve Smith (born May 12, 1979)
- Steve Smith (born June 28, 1979)
- Steve Smith (born 1985)
- Struggy Smith
- Stu Smith
- Sutton Smith
- Taj Smith
- Telvin Smith
- Terell Smith
- Terrance Smith
- Terrelle Smith
- Tevaun Smith
- Thomas Smith (born 1949)
- Thomas Smith (born 1970)
- Tim Smith
- Timmy Smith
- T. J. Smith
- Tody Smith
- Tommie Smith
- Tony Smith
- Torin Smith
- Torrey Smith
- Travian Smith
- Tremon Smith
- Trent Smith
- Tre'Quan Smith
- Trey Smith
- Troy Smith (born 1977)
- Troy Smith (born 1984)
- Truett Smith
- Tye Smith
- Tykee Smith
- Tyler Smith
- Tyreke Smith
- Tyron Smith
- Tyson Smith
- Vernice Smith
- Vinson Smith
- Vitamin Smith
- Vyncint Smith
- Waddell Smith
- Wade Smith
- Warren Smith
- Wayne Smith
- Wee Willie Smith
- Wes Smith
- Wilfred Smith
- Will Smith
- Willie Smith (born 1937)
- Willie Smith (born 1964)
- Willie Smith (born 1986)
- Xavier Smith
- Za'Darius Smith
- Zeke Smith
- Zuriel Smith
- Ihmir Smith-Marsette
- Jaxon Smith-Njigba
- JuJu Smith-Schuster
- Chau Smith-Wade
- James Smith-Williams
- Fish Smithson
- Mark Smolinski
- Isaac Smolko
- Dawuane Smoot
- Fred Smoot
- Raymond Smoot
- David Smukler
- Bill Smyth
- Charlie Smyth
- Lou Smyth
- Durham Smythe

== Sn–So ==
- Norm Snead
- Willie Snead
- Bob Sneddon
- Chris Snee
- L'Jarius Sneed
- Benny Snell Jr.
- Donald Snell
- George Snell
- Matt Snell
- Ray Snell
- Jason Snelling
- Ken Snelling
- Jim Sniadecki
- Malcolm Snider
- Matt Snider
- Ron Snidow
- Angelo Snipes
- Lee Snoots
- Matt Snorton
- David Snow
- Jack Snow
- Justin Snow
- Percy Snow
- Cal Snowden
- Charles Snowden
- Jim Snowden
- Adam Snyder
- Al Snyder
- Bob Snyder
- Bill Snyder
- Jim Snyder
- Kevin Snyder
- Loren Snyder
- Lum Snyder
- Pat Snyder
- Snitz Snyder
- Todd Snyder
- Hank Soar
- Ben Sobieski
- Phil Sobocinski
- Joe Soboleski
- Olaniyi Sobomehin
- Brian Sochia
- John Sodaski
- Alec Sofish
- Ben Sohn
- Benny Sohn
- Kurt Sohn
- Matt Sokol
- Kristjan Sokoli
- John Sokolosky
- Nate Solder
- Bob Soleau
- Paul Soliai
- Jake Soliday
- Ariel Solomon
- Freddie Solomon (born 1953)
- Freddie Solomon (born 1972)
- Javon Solomon
- Jesse Solomon
- Roland Solomon
- Scott Solomon
- Ron Solt
- Gordy Soltau
- Bob Soltis
- Mike Solwold
- George Somers
- Don Sommer
- Mike Sommer
- Jack Sommers
- Butch Songin
- Treg Songy
- Gus Sonnenberg
- Vic So'oto
- Isaac Sopoaga
- Ross Sorce
- Daniel Sorensen
- Nick Sorensen
- Glen Sorenson
- Jim Sorey
- Revie Sorey
- Jim Sorgi
- Barryn Sorrell
- Henry Sorrell
- Colby Sorsdal
- Bill Sortet
- Rick Sortun
- Lou Sossamon
- Frank Souchak
- Cecil Souders
- Ronnie Lee South
- Tom Southard
- Dezmen Southward
- Sidy Sow
- R. Jay Soward
- Bradley Sowell
- Jerald Sowell
- Robert Sowell
- Isaac Sowells
- Rich Sowells

== Sp–Sq ==
- Stephen Spach
- Vic Spadaccini
- Ryan Spadola
- Matt Spaeth
- Butch Spagna
- John Spagnola
- Martrell Spaight
- Dick Spain
- Quinton Spain
- Gene Spangler
- Gary Spani
- Frank Spaniel
- Antwain Spann
- Chad Spann
- Gary Spann
- Brevyn Spann-Ford
- Dave Sparenberg
- Al Sparkman
- Dave Sparks
- Phillippi Sparks
- Al Sparlis
- Ed Sparr
- Jim Spavital
- Breeland Speaks
- Glen Spear
- Armegis Spearman
- Anthony Spears
- Ernest Spears
- Marcus Spears (born 1971)
- Marcus Spears (born 1983)
- Quinton Spears
- Ron Spears
- Tyjae Spears
- Robert Specht
- Dutch Speck
- Baylon Spector
- Ameer Speed
- E.J. Speed
- Mac Speedie
- Cliff Speegle
- Nick Speegle
- Harry Speelman
- Del Speer
- Dick Speights
- Omar Speights
- Jeff Spek
- Frank Spellacy
- Alonzo Spellman
- Jack Spellman
- Akeem Spence
- Blake Spence
- Julian Spence
- Noah Spence
- Sean Spence
- Anthony Spencer
- Charles Spencer
- Chris Spencer
- Cody Spencer
- Darryl Spencer
- Diontae Spencer
- Evan Spencer
- Herb Spencer
- Jim Spencer
- Jimmy Spencer
- Joe Spencer
- Marquiss Spencer
- Mo Spencer
- Ollie Spencer
- Shawntae Spencer
- Tim Spencer
- Todd Spencer
- Willie Spencer
- Kory Sperry
- George Speth
- Cotton Speyrer
- Paul Spicer
- Rob Spicer
- Clarence Spiegel
- Chris Spielman
- Bob Spiers
- Amari Spievey
- Brandon Spikes
- Cameron Spikes
- Irving Spikes
- Jack Spikes
- Takeo Spikes
- John Spilis
- Robert Spillane
- C. J. Spiller
- Isaiah Spiller
- Philip Spiller
- Ray Spillers
- C. J. Spillman
- Marc Spindler
- Jack Spinks
- Art Spinney
- Greg Spires
- John Spirida
- Austin Spitler
- Bob Spitulski
- Jason Spitz
- Andy Spiva
- Mike Spivey
- Sebron Spivey
- Bob Sponaugle
- Brandon Spoon
- Danny Spradlin
- Donnie Spragan
- Jason Spriggs
- Marcus Spriggs (born 1974)
- Marcus Spriggs (born 1976)
- Hal Springer
- Kirk Springs
- Ron Springs
- Shawn Springs
- Bill Springsteen
- Ed Sprinkle
- Hugh Sprinkle
- Jeremy Sprinkle
- Darren Sproles
- Jimmy Sprotte
- Dennis Sproul
- Jim Spruill
- Micheal Spurlock
- Steve Spurrier
- Damion Square
- Jack Squirek
- Seaman Squyres

== St.–Ste ==
- Amon-Ra St. Brown
- Equanimeous St. Brown
- Bob St. Clair
- John St. Clair
- Mike St. Clair
- Ted St. Germaine
- Len St. Jean
- Herb St. John
- Benjamin St-Juste
- Brad St. Louis
- Tyree St. Louis
- Brian St. Pierre
- Jeremy Staat
- Brian Stablein
- Ken Stabler
- Ed Stacco
- Dave Stachelski
- Ray Stachowicz
- Rich Stachowski
- Charles Stackhouse
- Nazir Stackhouse
- Jack Stackpool
- Billy Stacy
- Red Stacy
- Siran Stacy
- Zac Stacy
- John Stadnik
- Spike Staff
- Daimion Stafford
- Dick Stafford
- Harrison Stafford
- Matthew Stafford
- Jon Staggers
- Jeff Staggs
- Jake Stahl
- Dick Stahlman
- Brenden Stai
- Isaiah Stalbird
- Jerry Stalcup
- Bill Staley
- Duce Staley
- Joe Staley
- Dennis Stallings
- Don Stallings
- Larry Stallings
- Ramondo Stallings
- Robert Stallings
- Tre Stallings
- Dave Stalls
- Donté Stallworth
- John Stallworth
- Ron Stallworth
- Taylor Stallworth
- Tim Stallworth
- Josh Stamer
- John Stamper
- Sylvester Stamps
- Frank Stams
- Harry Stanback
- Haskel Stanback
- Isaiah Stanback
- Jeff Stanciel
- John Standeford
- Norm Standlee
- Dick Stanfel
- Bill Stanfill
- Julian Stanford
- R. J. Stanford
- Scott Stankavage
- Basil Stanley
- C.B. Stanley
- Chad Stanley
- Derek Stanley
- Israel Stanley
- Jayson Stanley
- Matt Stanley
- Montavious Stanley
- Ronald Stanley
- Ronnie Stanley
- Sylvester Stanley
- Walter Stanley
- Don Stansauk
- Ed Stansbury
- Bill Stanton
- Drew Stanton
- Henry Stanton
- Jack Stanton
- Johnny Stanton
- Justin Staples
- Darnell Stapleton
- Ken Starch
- Tony Stargell
- Chad Stark
- Howard Stark
- Rohn Stark
- George Starke
- Jason Starkey
- Duane Starks
- James Starks
- Malaki Starks
- Marshall Starks
- Max Starks
- Randy Starks
- Scott Starks
- Timothy Starks
- Jawanza Starling
- Kendrick Starling
- John Starnes
- Paul Staroba
- Bart Starr
- Tyler Starr
- Ben Starret
- Stephen Starring
- Leo Stasica
- Stan Stasica
- Ralph Staten
- Randy Staten
- Robert Staten
- Larry Station
- Jim Staton
- Art Statuto
- Roger Staubach
- Scott Stauch
- Jason Staurovsky
- Jerry Stautberg
- Ernie Stautner
- Odell Stautzenberger
- Joe Staysniak
- John Steber
- Aaron Stecker
- Jordan Steckler
- Troy Stedman
- Joel Steed
- Ben Steele
- Carson Steele
- Chuck Steele
- Cliff Steele
- Ernie Steele
- Glen Steele
- Larry Steele
- Markus Steele
- Red Steele
- Robert Steele
- Terence Steele
- Anthony Steels
- Anthony Steen
- Frank Steen
- Jim Steen
- Tyler Steen
- Robert Steeples
- Dick Steere
- Jim Steffen
- Bob Stefik
- Milt Stegall
- Larry Stegent
- Pete Steger
- Ron Stehouwer
- Bill Stein
- Bob Stein
- Herb Stein
- Russ Stein
- Sammy Stein
- Eric Steinbach
- Larry Steinbach
- Don Steinbrunner
- Rebel Steiner
- Al Steinfeld
- Fred Steinfort
- Gil Steinke
- Bill Steinkemper
- Dean Steinkuhler
- David Steinmetz
- Ken Steinmetz
- Craig Steltz
- Kevin Stemke
- Greg Stemrick
- Logan Stenberg
- Jan Stenerud
- Brian Stenger
- Paul Stenn
- Stud Stennett
- Mike Stensrud
- Steve Stenstrom
- Joe Stepanek
- Alex Stepanovich
- Scott Stephen
- Shamar Stephen
- Bill Stephens
- Brandon Stephens
- Bruce Stephens
- Calvin Stephens
- Darnell Stephens
- Emmanuel Stephens
- Hal Stephens
- Harold Stephens
- Jamain Stephens
- John Stephens
- Johnny Stephens
- Larry Stephens
- Leonard Stephens
- Linden Stephens
- Mac Stephens
- Ray Stephens
- Red Stephens
- Reggie Stephens
- Richard Stephens
- Rod Stephens
- Santo Stephens
- Steve Stephens
- Thomas Stephens
- Travis Stephens
- Tremayne Stephens
- LaRod Stephens-Howling
- Dave Stephenson
- Donald Stephenson
- Dwight Stephenson
- Kay Stephenson
- Mark Stepnoski
- Mike Steponovich
- Tony Steponovich
- Jack Steptoe
- Syndric Steptoe
- John Sterling
- Neal Sterling
- Dutch Sternaman
- Joey Sternaman
- Jace Sternberger
- Caden Sterns
- Gil Sterr
- Zach Sterup
- Bill Stetz
- Bob Steuber
- Todd Steussie
- Billy Stevens
- Craig Stevens
- Dick Stevens
- Don Stevens
- Howard Stevens
- JaCoby Stevens
- Jerramy Stevens
- Larry Stevens
- Mark Stevens
- Matt Stevens (born 1964)
- Matt Stevens (born 1973)
- Peter P. Stevens
- Tommy Stevens
- Art Stevenson
- Dominique Stevenson
- Mark Stevenson (born 1893)
- Mark Stevenson (born 1956)
- Marquez Stevenson
- Ralph Stevenson
- Rhamondre Stevenson
- Ricky Stevenson
- Tyrique Stevenson
- Norris Steverson
- Dean Steward
- Reddy Steward
- Tony Steward
- Andrew Stewart
- ArDarius Stewart
- Charlie Stewart
- Curtis Stewart
- Daleroy Stewart
- Darian Stewart
- David Stewart
- Grover Stewart
- James Stewart (born December 8, 1971)
- James Stewart (born December 27, 1971)
- Jason Stewart
- Jeremy Stewart
- Jimmy Stewart
- Joe Stewart
- Jonathan Stewart
- Josaiah Stewart
- Kordell Stewart
- Mark Stewart
- Matt Stewart
- Michael Stewart
- M. J. Stewart
- Quincy Stewart
- Ralph Stewart
- Rayna Stewart
- Ryan Stewart
- Shemar Stewart
- Steve Stewart
- Tony Stewart
- Vaughn Stewart
- Wayne Stewart

== Sti–Sty ==
- Easton Stick
- Clint Stickdorn
- Walt Stickel
- Monty Stickles
- Howard Stidham
- Jarrett Stidham
- Dave Stief
- Jim Stienke
- Terry Stieve
- Jim Stifler
- Jim Stiger
- Qwan'tez Stiggers
- Art Still
- Bryan Still
- Devon Still
- Tarheeb Still
- Ben Stille
- Dante Stills
- Gary Stills
- Jim Still
- Ken Stills
- Kenny Stills
- Roger Stillwell
- Gaylord Stinchcomb
- Jon Stinchcomb
- Matt Stinchcomb
- Thomas Stincic
- Byron Stingily
- Darryl Stingley
- Derek Stingley Jr.
- James Stinnette
- Aaron Stinnie
- Ed Stinson
- Lemuel Stinson
- Carel Stith
- Howard Stith
- Shyrone Stith
- Bill Stits
- Clint Stitser
- Bill Stobbs
- Herb Stock
- John Stock
- Mark Stock
- Ralph Stockemer
- Luke Stocker
- Hust Stockton
- Mule Stockton
- Eric Stocz
- Earl Stoecklein
- Terry Stoepel
- Clint Stoerner
- John Stofa
- Ken Stofer
- Ed Stofko
- Frank Stojack
- Barry Stokes
- Dixie Stokes
- Eric Stokes (born 1962)
- Eric Stokes (born 1973)
- Eric Stokes (born 1999)
- Fred Stokes
- J. J. Stokes
- Jesse Stokes
- Sims Stokes
- Tim Stokes
- Brandon Stokley
- Anton Stolfa
- Tom Stolhandske
- Chris Stoll
- Jack Stoll
- Bryan Stoltenberg
- Avatus Stone
- Billy Stone
- Daren Stone
- Donnie Stone
- Dwight Stone
- Geno Stone
- Jack Stone
- James Stone
- John Stone
- Ken Stone
- Michael Stone
- Ron Stone
- John Stonebraker
- Mike Stonebreaker
- Steve Stonebreaker
- Jake Stoneburner
- Ryan Stonehouse
- Dillon Stoner
- Don Stonesifer
- Mike Stoops
- Byron Storer
- Jack Storer
- Bryan Stork
- Ed Storm
- Greg Storr
- Bill Story
- Erik Storz
- Hal Stotsbery
- Rich Stotter
- Cliff Stoudt
- Kelly Stouffer
- Glen Stough
- Jordan Stout
- Pete Stout
- Upton Stout
- Omar Stoutmire
- Dick Stovall
- Jerry Stovall
- Maurice Stovall
- Cade Stover
- Jeff Stover
- Matt Stover
- Smokey Stover
- Otto Stowe
- Tyronne Stowe
- Tommie Stowers
- Pete Stoyanovich
- Connor Strachan
- Michael Strachan
- Mike Strachan
- Steve Strachan
- Charlie Strack
- Tim Stracka
- John Strada
- Red Strader
- Troy Stradford
- Art Strahan
- Michael Strahan
- Derrick Strait
- Clem Stralka
- Mike Stramiello
- Eli Strand
- Leif Strand
- Brenton Strange
- Cole Strange
- Bob Stransky
- Dutch Strassner
- Mike Stratton
- Jimmy Strausbaugh
- Dutch Strauss
- Thomas Strauthers
- Don Straw
- Les Strayhorn
- Eric Streater
- Rod Streater
- Devin Street
- Kentavius Street
- George Streeter
- Tommy Streeter
- Tai Streets
- Rich Strenger
- Chris Streveler
- Bill Stribling
- Tony Stricker
- Bill Strickland
- Bishop Strickland
- Dave Strickland
- Donald Strickland
- Fred Strickland
- Larry Strickland
- Loren Strickland
- Zach Strief
- Bill Striegel
- Danny Striggow
- Art Stringer
- Bob Stringer
- Gene Stringer
- Korey Stringer
- Scott Stringer
- Hal Stringert
- Joe Stringfellow
- Justin Strnad
- Don Strock
- Woody Strode
- Mike Strofolino
- George Strohmeyer
- Frank Strom
- Rick Strom
- Greg Stroman
- Michael Stromberg
- Ricky Stromberg
- Darrell Strong
- Dorian Strong
- Frank Strong
- Jaelen Strong
- Jim Strong
- Ken Strong
- Kevin Strong
- Mack Strong
- Pierre Strong
- Ray Strong
- William Strong
- James Stroschein
- Aubrey Strosnider
- Vince Stroth
- Billy Strother
- Deon Strother
- C. J. Stroud
- Jack Stroud
- Marcus Stroud
- Morris Stroud
- Sammie Stroughter
- Jason Strowbridge
- Art Strozier
- Wilbur Strozier
- George Strugar
- Art Strutt
- Dan Stryzinski
- Justin Strzelczyk
- Johnny Strzykalski
- Grant Stuard
- Jim Stuart
- Roy Stuart
- Dana Stubblefield
- Danny Stubbs
- Chansi Stuckey
- Darrell Stuckey
- Henry Stuckey
- Jim Stuckey
- Shawn Stuckey
- Mark Studaway
- Dave Studdard
- Kasey Studdard
- Les Studdard
- Vern Studdard
- Andy Studebaker
- Darren Studstill
- Pat Studstill
- Scott Studwell
- Andrew Stueber
- Mel Stuessy
- Harry Stuhldreher
- Charlie Stukes
- Jonathan Stupar
- Nate Stupar
- Cecil Sturgeon
- Lyle Sturgeon
- Caleb Sturgis
- Oscar Sturgis
- Jerry Sturm
- Fred Sturt
- Dick Sturtridge
- Danny Stutsman
- Boone Stutz
- Russell Stuvaints
- Joe Stydahar
- Lorenzo Styles
- Andy Stynchula

== Su–Sz ==
- Xavier Su'a-Filo
- Nicky Sualua
- Kingsley Suamataia
- Nick Subis
- Ryan Succop
- Larry Suchy
- Paul Suchy
- Bob Suci
- Steve Sucic
- Nate Sudfeld
- Zach Sudfeld
- Ray Suess
- Bob Suffridge
- Leo Sugar
- Lee Suggs
- Shafer Suggs
- Terrell Suggs
- Walter Suggs
- Ndamukong Suh
- Matt Suhey
- Steve Suhey
- Shaun Suisham
- Joe Sulaitis
- Alex Sulfsted
- George Sulima
- John Sullins
- Sullivan
- Bob Sullivan (born 1923)
- Bob Sullivan (born 1924)
- Carl Sullivan
- Chandon Sullivan
- Chris Sullivan
- Dan Sullivan
- Dave Sullivan
- Frank Sullivan
- George Sullivan (born 1897)
- George Sullivan (born 1926)
- Gerry Sullivan
- Hew Sullivan
- Jack Sullivan
- Torchy Sullivan
- Jim Sullivan
- John Sullivan (born 1956)
- John Sullivan (born 1961)
- John Sullivan (born 1985)
- Johnathan Sullivan
- Kent Sullivan
- Marques Sullivan
- Mike Sullivan
- Pat Sullivan
- Stephen Sullivan
- Steve Sullivan
- Tom Sullivan
- Tre Sullivan
- Ivory Sully
- Dave Suminski
- Tony Sumler
- Pat Summerall
- Carl Summerell
- Bob Summerhays
- Don Summers
- Frank Summers
- Freddie Summers
- Jim Summers
- Ty Summers
- Wilbur Summers
- Charlie Sumner
- Walt Sumner
- Tony Sumpter
- Rex Sunahara
- Nick Sundberg
- Milt Sunde
- Jalen Sundell
- Vinnie Sunseri
- Ian Sunter
- Steve Superick
- Kywin Supernaw
- Phillip Supernaw
- Len Supulski
- Chazz Surratt
- Patrick Surtain
- Patrick Surtain II
- Nick Susoeff
- Ed Sustersic
- George Sutch
- Don Sutherin
- Doug Sutherland
- Keaton Sutherland
- Vinny Sutherland
- John Sutro
- Eddie Sutter
- Ryan Sutter
- Jason Suttle
- Archie Sutton
- Cameron Sutton
- Courtland Sutton
- Ed Sutton
- Eric Sutton
- Frank Sutton
- Joe Sutton
- Jon Sutton
- Mickey Sutton (born 1943)
- Mickey Sutton (born 1960)
- Mike Sutton
- Mitch Sutton
- Reggie Sutton
- Ricky Sutton
- Tyrell Sutton
- Will Sutton
- Harland Svare
- Bud Svendsen
- George Svendsen
- Paul Sverchek
- Bob Svihus
- Will Svitek
- Bill Svoboda
- Geoff Swaim
- Al Swain
- Bill Swain
- Brett Swain
- Freddie Swain
- John Swain
- Russ Swan
- Bill Swancutt
- Karl Swanke
- Charles Swann
- Damian Swann
- Eric Swann
- Lynn Swann
- Eric Swanson
- Evar Swanson
- Pete Swanson
- Shane Swanson
- Terry Swanson
- Travis Swanson
- George Swarn
- Gregg Swartwoudt
- Richard Swatland
- Shawn Swayda
- Harry Swayne
- Kevin Swayne
- D. J. Swearinger
- Josh Sweat
- Montez Sweat
- T'Vondre Sweat
- Limas Sweed
- Calvin Sweeney
- Jake Sweeney
- Jim Sweeney
- Kevin Sweeney
- Neal Sweeney
- Steve Sweeney
- Tommy Sweeney
- Walt Sweeney
- Fred Sweet
- Joe Sweet
- Tony Sweet
- Karl Sweetan
- Rod Sweeting
- Fred Sweetland
- J. R. Sweezy
- Bob Sweiger
- Bob Swenson
- Bill Swiacki
- Phil Swiadon
- Larry Swider
- D'Andre Swift
- Doug Swift
- Justin Swift
- Michael Swift
- Dennis Swilley
- Pat Swilling
- Tre Swilling
- Erwin Swiney
- Wayne Swinford
- Rashod Swinger
- Jim Swink
- Clovis Swinney
- Bradyn Swinson
- Reggie Swinton
- Bob Swisher
- Mike Swistowicz
- Marvin Switzer
- Ryan Switzer
- Veryl Switzer
- Craig Swoope
- Erik Swoope
- Pat Swoopes
- Tyrone Swoopes
- Sam Sword
- Jeff Sydner
- Harry Sydney
- Willie Sydnor
- Alfred Sykes
- Bob Sykes
- Eugene Sykes
- Jashon Sykes
- Joe Sykes
- John Sykes
- Rudy Sylvan
- John Sylvester
- Steve Sylvester
- Stevenson Sylvester
- John Symank
- Josh Symonette
- John Synhorst
- Quinn Sypniewski
- Stan Sytsma
- J.J. Syvrud
- Len Szafaryn
- Paul Szakash
- Thatcher Szalay
- Rich Szaro
- Joe Szczecko
- Andre Szmyt
- Walt Szot
- Dave Szott
- Dave Szymakowski
- Dick Szymanski
- Frank Szymanski
- Jim Szymanski
