= Studdard =

Studdard is a surname. Notable people with the surname include:

- Dave Studdard (born 1955), former tackle in the National Football League for the Denver Broncos
- Kasey Studdard (born 1984), American football player for the Houston Texans of the National Football League
- Ruben Studdard (born 1978), American pop, R&B, and gospel singer
