= Larry Steele (disambiguation) =

Larry Steele (born 1949) is an American basketball player.

Larry Steele may also refer to:

- Larry Steele (producer) (1913–1980), American songwriter and impresario
- Larry Steele (American football) (born 1950), American football player
