= Bryant–Denny Stadium =

Stadium in Tuscaloosa, Alabama US

Saban Field at Bryant–Denny Stadium.
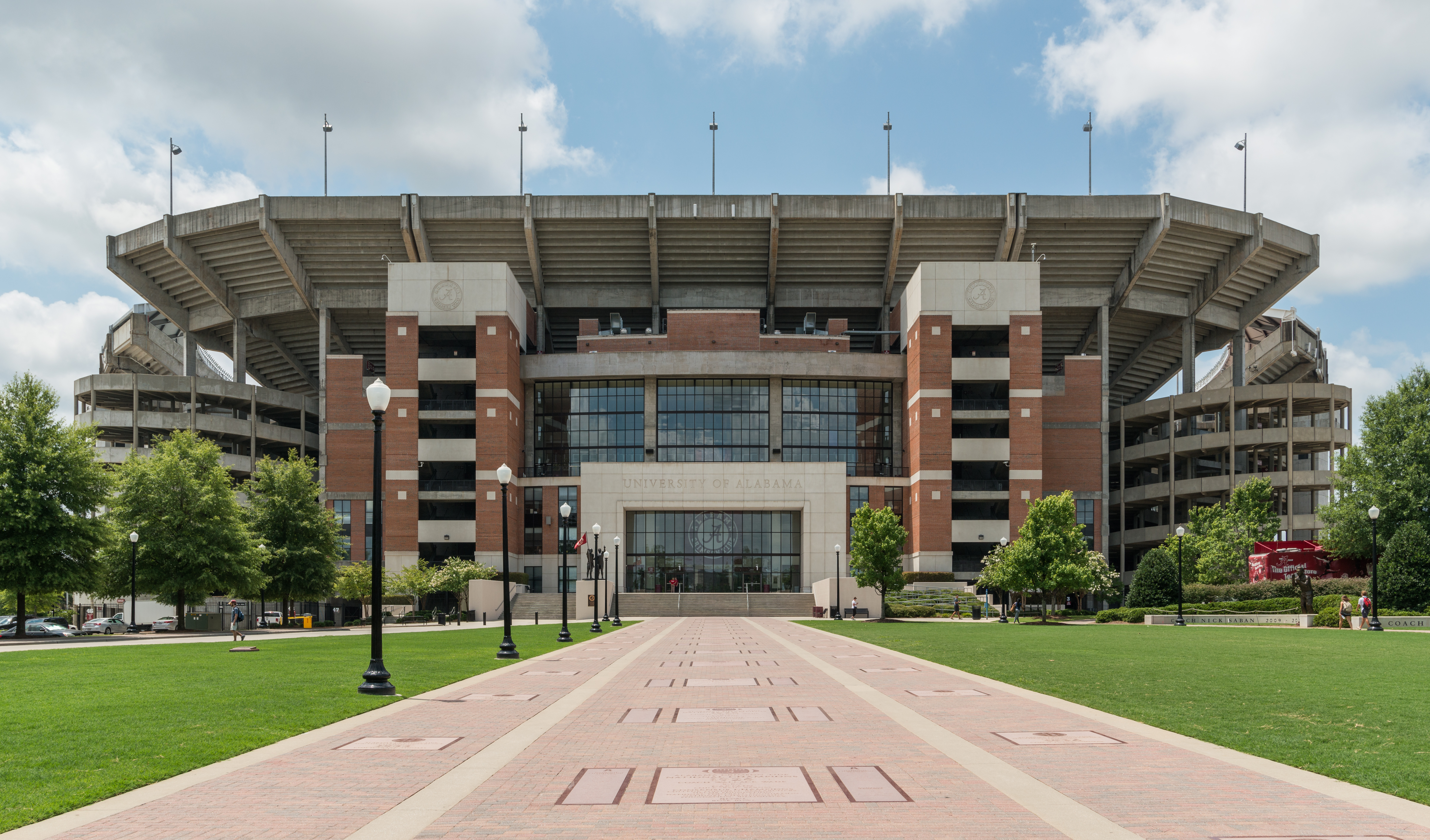
- Saban Field at Bryant–Denny Stadium in 2016
- Interactive map of Saban Field at Bryant–Denny Stadium.
- Full name: Saban Field at Bryant–Denny Stadium
- Former names: Denny Stadium (1929–1975); Bryant–Denny Stadium (1975–2024)
- Location: 920 Paul W Bryant Drive; Tuscaloosa, Alabama, U.S.
- Coordinates: 33°12′30″N 87°33′1″W
- Capacity: 100,077
- Surface: Grass (1929–1967); AstroTurf (1968–1990); Grass (1991–present)
- Record attendance: 101,821

Construction
- Groundbreaking: December 1928
- Opened: September 28, 1929
- Expanded: 1937, 1946, 1961, 1966, 1988, 1998, 2006, 2010
- Cost: $196,000 ($3.68 million in 2025)
- Architects: Atwood and Nash, Inc., Architects and Engineers

Tenants
- Alabama Crimson Tide (NCAA) (1929–1986, 1988–present); AHSAA Super 7 (2009–2023)

Website
- rolltide.com/bryant-denny

Saban Field at Bryant–Denny Stadium is an outdoor stadium on the campus of the University of Alabama in Tuscaloosa. It is the home field of the Alabama Crimson Tide football team of the Southeastern Conference (SEC).

Opened in 1929, it was originally named Denny Stadium in honor of George H. Denny, the school's president from 1912 to 1932. In 1975, the state legislature added longtime head coach and alumnus Paul "Bear" Bryant to the stadium's name. Bryant led the Tide for seven more seasons, through 1982, and is one of the few in Division I to have coached at a venue bearing his name. In 2024, Alabama announced that the playing field would be named after its second-winningest head coach, Nick Saban, who led the Crimson Tide to 6 national championships between 2007 and 2023.

With a seating capacity of 100,077, it is the fourth-largest stadium in the Southeastern Conference, the eighth-largest stadium in the United States, and the tenth-largest stadium in the world.

== Construction history ==
The replacement for Denny Field, Denny Stadium opened in 1929, with 6,000 in attendance for a 55–0 victory over Mississippi College on September 28. It was officially dedicated the following week at homecoming ceremonies against Ole Miss, a 22–7 Crimson Tide victory. Originally, the stadium had a capacity of 12,000—the lower half of the current stadium's east grandstand. However, President Denny initially envisioned a full bowl stadium capable of seating 66,000.

Before the 1937 season, permanent seats were built along the east sideline, increasing the capacity to 24,000. Further expansions in 1946 (bleachers in both end zones), 1961 (new seats in west grandstand), and 1966 (both end zones fully enclosed, new seats in east grandstand) raised capacity to 31,000, 43,000, and 60,210, respectively. An upper deck was added to the west side in 1988 and raised the seating by nearly 10,000 to 70,123. During the construction, the Crimson Tide played its entire 1987 home schedule at Legion Field in Birmingham, 57 miles (90 km) northeast of Bryant–Denny.

=== East upper deck (1998) ===
In September 1995, the University of Alabama System Board of Trustees approved the construction of the east upper deck. Designed by the architectural firm of Heery-Chambless-Adams, the construction was financed by the university and $4.65 million from the city of Tuscaloosa, the city of Northport, and Tuscaloosa County. The localities contributed to construction costs in return for the university pledging to move all Crimson Tide home games to Bryant–Denny and not play any at Legion Field.

The new upper deck provided 10,000 additional bleacher seats and 81 skyboxes on two levels—63 16-seat and 18 24-seat capacity boxes. In 1999, four additional skyboxes were built to bring the total number of skyboxes to 85. A JumboTron scoreboard with video display capabilities was erected in the south end zone and was at the time the largest in collegiate sports. Additionally, a new east side entrance tower, a brick façade and reception areas for the Scholarship and A-Club level patrons was also added during the 1998 expansion.

The stadium's eastern upper deck was opened in 1998 and raised its official seating capacity to 83,818 at a final cost of $35 million for the addition. The newly expanded venue debuted on September 5, and Alabama defeated BYU 38–31 as running back Shaun Alexander set a Tide single-game record with five touchdowns.

=== North end zone expansion (2006) ===
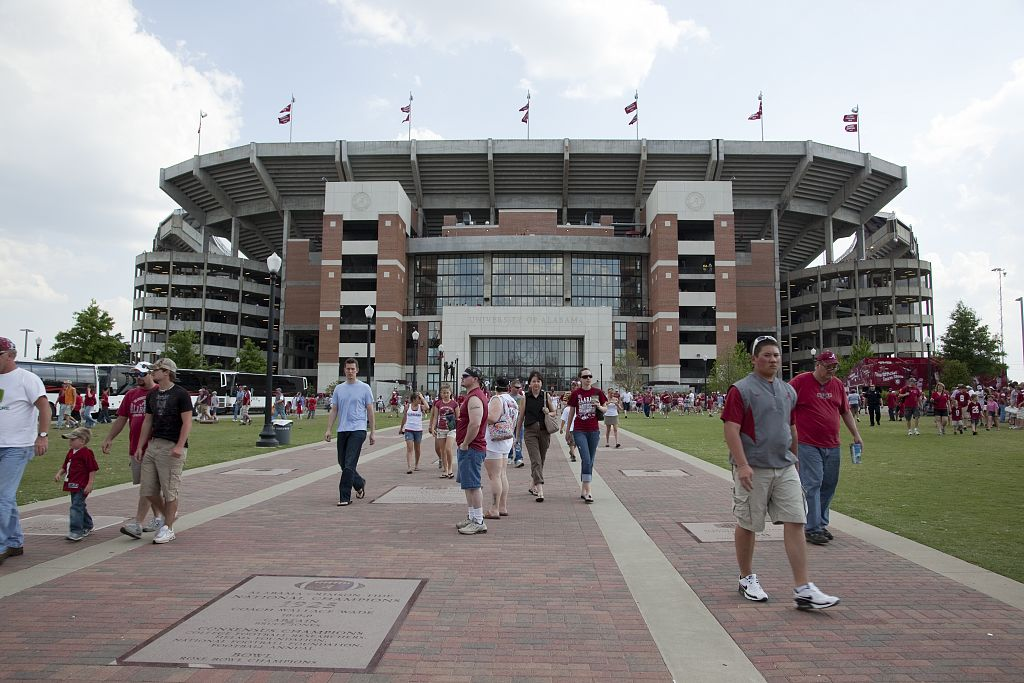
View of the north end zone of the stadium exterior and the Walk of Champions on gameday

Following the 2004 season, the university spent approximately $47 million on an expansion to the north end zone, which was completed days before the 2006 opener against Hawaii. It added a new upper deck to the North end zone area, complete with three different levels of skyboxes, which collectively are known as "The Zone", which brought the number of skyboxes in the stadium to 123. Two large display screens by Daktronics were placed in each corner of the north end zone, and LCD ribbon screens, 3.5 feet (1.1 m) tall by 422 feet (129 m) wide, were placed along the front edge of the east and west upper decks.

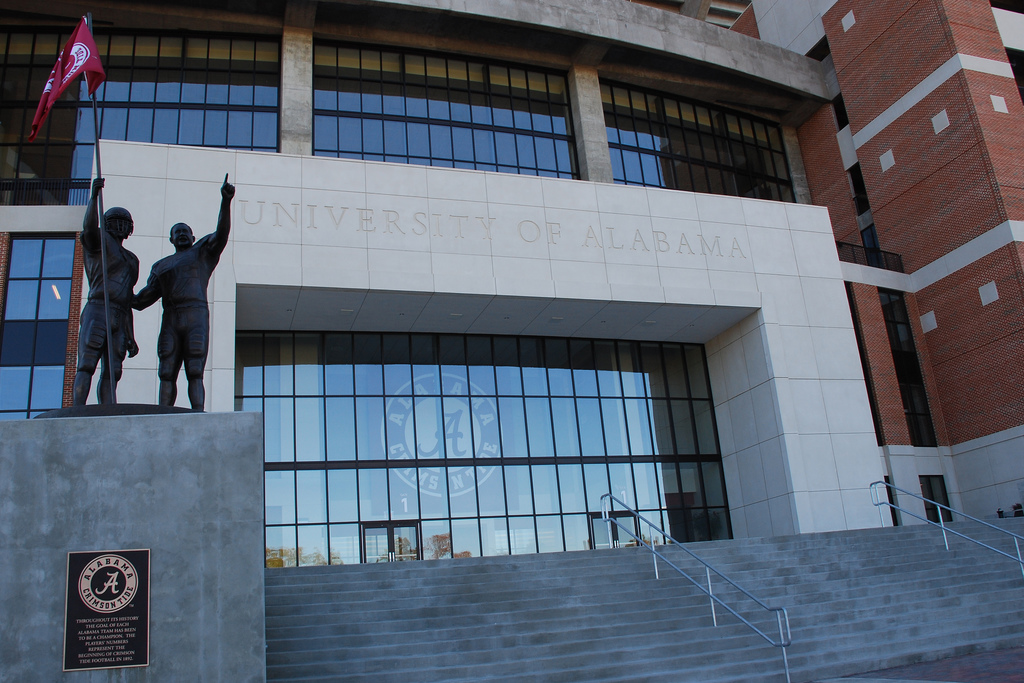
The north end zone entrance in 2007, with commemorative Alabama players statuary group on the left

Massive changes were made to the grounds of the north side of the stadium with the addition of a Walk of Champions. Building the Walk of Champions required the demolition of the Delta Kappa Epsilon fraternity house and the grading of the hill it sat upon. The Walk of Champions comprises a brick plaza leading from University Boulevard to the north end zone entrances. The plaza features 16 granite monuments set into the walkway commemorating the Crimson Tide's SEC and national championship teams throughout the years. Along the west side of the plaza are five roughly 2,000-pound (910 kg), 9-foot (2.7 m) tall bronze statues, one for each Alabama football coach who has led the Crimson Tide to a national championship. Each statue has a semicircular wall behind it bearing the coach's name and the year(s) that he led the team to a national championship. The first four statues, unveiled during the opening in 2006, included Wallace Wade, Frank Thomas, Paul "Bear" Bryant, and Gene Stallings. The fifth statue, that of Nick Saban, was unveiled prior to the A-Day game on April 16, 2011. It commemorates Saban guiding Alabama to its 13th National Championship with a 37–21 win over the Texas Longhorns.

Finally, there is a bronze statuary group of two anonymous Alabama football players at the entrance to the north end zone, with the one on the left holding a large Alabama Crimson Tide flag upright on a flagpole. This player is wearing the number 18 and a helmet, with the player on the right wearing the number 92 and pointing into the distance. The jersey numbers represent 1892, the first season of Crimson Tide football.

The north end zone was opened for the 2006 season opener versus Hawaii, which set a new record attendance of 92,138. The Crimson Tide was victorious, 25–17.

=== South end zone expansion (2010) ===
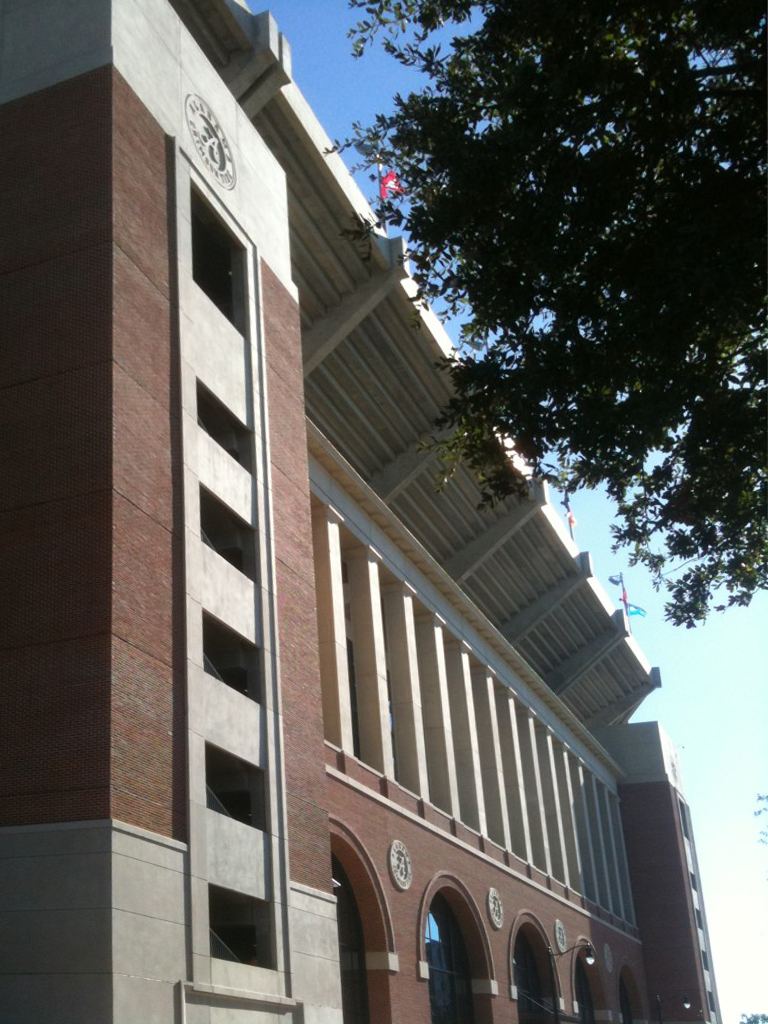
Exterior of the newly expanded south end zone in 2010

The University of Alabama Board of Trustees approved a study for further expansion of Bryant–Denny on September 19, 2008. The Physical Properties Committee of the University of Alabama Board of Trustees heard a presentation from the UA athletic department on November 13, 2008 regarding the proposed $80.6 million expansion of the south end zone upper deck and suite level of Bryant–Denny Stadium. The proposed expansion would bring the stadium's capacity to approximately 101,600, therefore making it the second largest stadium in the Southeastern Conference (SEC), and the fifth largest stadium in college football. The committee unanimously approved the project to move into the third of four stages, the fourth being final approval to begin construction.

On February 6, 2009, the university's board of trustees voted unanimously and without discussion to give the final approval for construction to commence on the south end zone expansion. With the approval of the board of trustees, construction began in the spring of 2009 and continued throughout the 2009 football season. The expansion was finished in time for the first game of the team's 2010 season.

Aerial view of Bryant-Denny stadium in 2010.

The Tuscaloosa News reported on April 17, 2009 that due to the economic climate and resultant lowered construction costs, the stadium expansion cost $15 million less than expected, coming in around $65.6 million.

The expanded south end zone now includes a two level South Zone club with a total of 1,700 seats and 36 skyboxes to bring the total number of skyboxes in Bryant–Denny Stadium to 159, as well as an 8,500 seat upper deck. The entire stadium's audio/visual system was upgraded to include two new video boards in both corners of the south end zone.

Prior to the 2009 season, the large south scoreboard was disassembled to make way for the construction of the new stadium expansion. During this process, some welding equipment started a fire that burned the inside of the scoreboard. Also, during this time, four new play clocks and down/distance indicators were installed (one behind each corner of the end zones) and a new LED game clock was placed behind the south goalpost.

The expansion was completed in mid-summer 2010 and held an official capacity of 101,821 making it the fifth largest college football stadium in the country. The new seats were all sold out quickly for the entire 2010 football season. Subsequent expansions included stores and other extra amenities on the bottom of the end zone.

=== Renovations (2019–2024) ===
As part of a larger, 10-year $600 million plan to upgrade campus athletic facilities, the university is planning $92.5 million in upgrades to the stadium, including new social spaces, improved circulation, additional premium seating and upgraded spaces for athletes and recruits. The Walk of Champions will be extended into a new game day locker room via a new tunnel clad with video boards. The project will be funded with $48.4 million in bonds and $35 million from the Crimson Tide Foundation, the fundraising arm of UA athletics. Construction began shortly after the 2019 season.

New LED lights for the stadium were unveiled on the night of August 12, 2019, including a crimson-hued light display by the new installations.

In 2024 The University of Alabama added a sign to the east and west upper deck that says Saban Field at Bryant–Denny Stadium, to honor long-time head coach Nick Saban, who served as the head coach from 2007–2023.

=== Expansion timeline ===
Year	Summary	Capacity
1929	Stadium opened as grandstand on west sideline	12,000
1937	Permanent grandstand added to east sideline	24,000
1946	Bleachers added to both end zones	31,000
1961	Seats added to west grandstand	43,000
1966	Both end zones fully enclosed	60,210
1988	West side upper deck	70,123
1998	East side upper deck	83,818
2006	North end zone expansion and upper deck	92,138
2010	South end zone expansion and upper deck	101,821
2020	Expanded premium and accessible seating	100,077

== Football lore ==
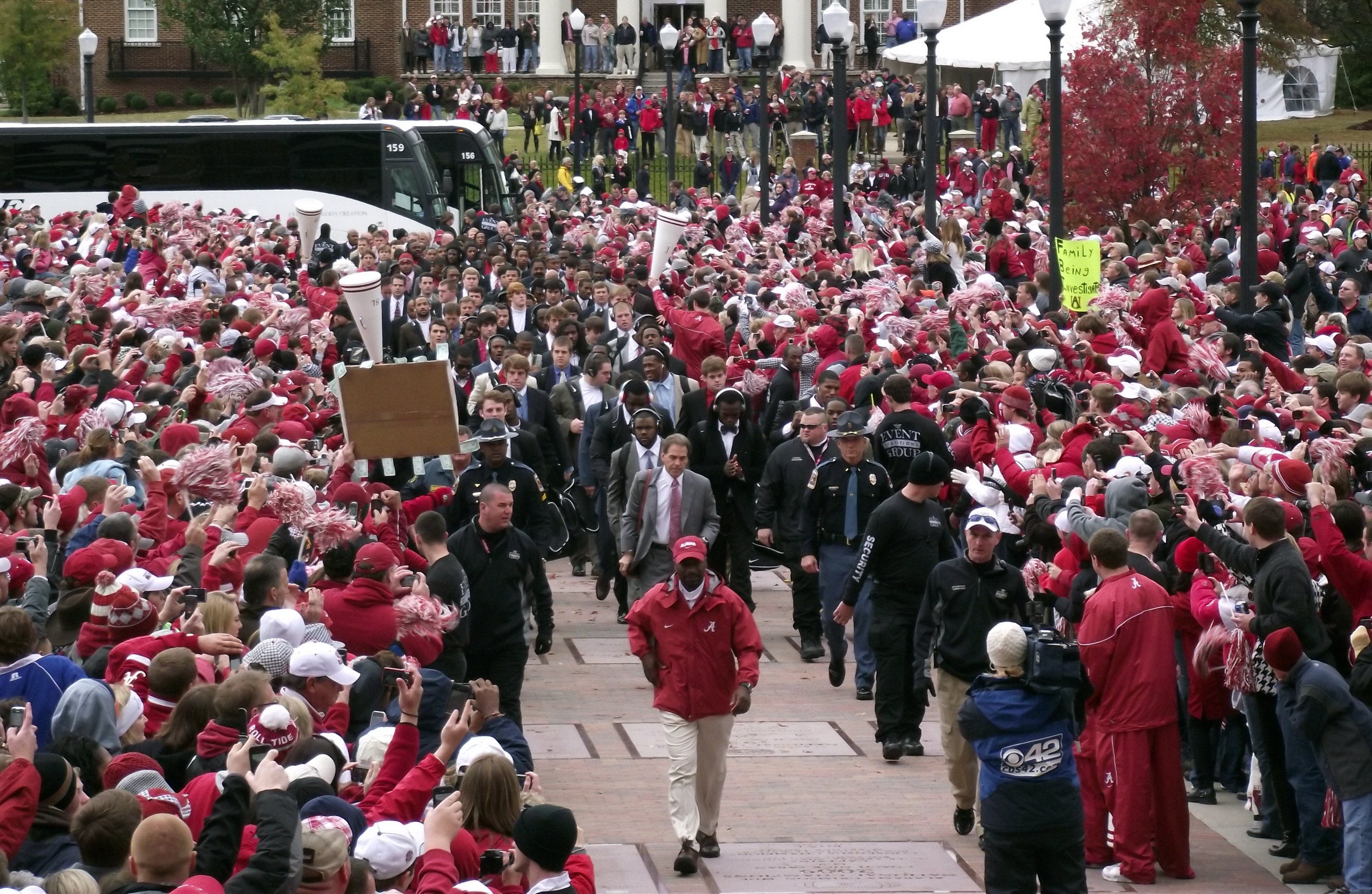
The Walk of Champions prior to the 2010 Iron Bowl

Since its opening in 1929 through 2023, the Crimson Tide owns a 249–52 –3 (.824) record at Bryant–Denny Stadium. Nick Saban is the leader in wins at the stadium, with an all-time record of 88–7–0 (.926) since 2007, as 3 home game wins were vacated by the NCAA that year.

Despite its success at Bryant–Denny, most of Alabama's "home" football history from the 1920s through the 1980s occurred at Birmingham's Legion Field. Well into the 1980s, Legion Field seated almost 20,000 more people than Bryant-Denny. As such, until the late 1990s, Legion Field hosted most of Alabama's important home games. The most notable of these games was the Iron Bowl with rival Auburn. Legion Field was considered a neutral site from 1948 through 1987. When the Iron Bowl became a home-and-home series in 1988, Alabama continued to host its home games in the series at Legion Field in even-numbered years through 1998. The Crimson Tide hosted Tennessee in odd-numbered years in Birmingham until 1999, and LSU in even-numbered years from 1964 through 1986, except for 1980. Usually, Bryant–Denny hosted three or four games per season, mostly non-conference games, although the Tide always played Mississippi State in Tuscaloosa, save for 1987, due to the close distance between Tuscaloosa and Starkville. However, in 1998, when Bryant–Denny was expanded to a capacity exceeding Legion Field, the more important home games started to move to Bryant–Denny, culminating with the move of the Tennessee series to Tuscaloosa in 1999 and the Iron Bowl a year later. From 1998 to 2003, Alabama continued to play two or three minor games in Birmingham. Finally, in 2003, Alabama played its final game at Legion Field against the South Florida Bulls, and now Bryant–Denny is the sole home of Alabama football.

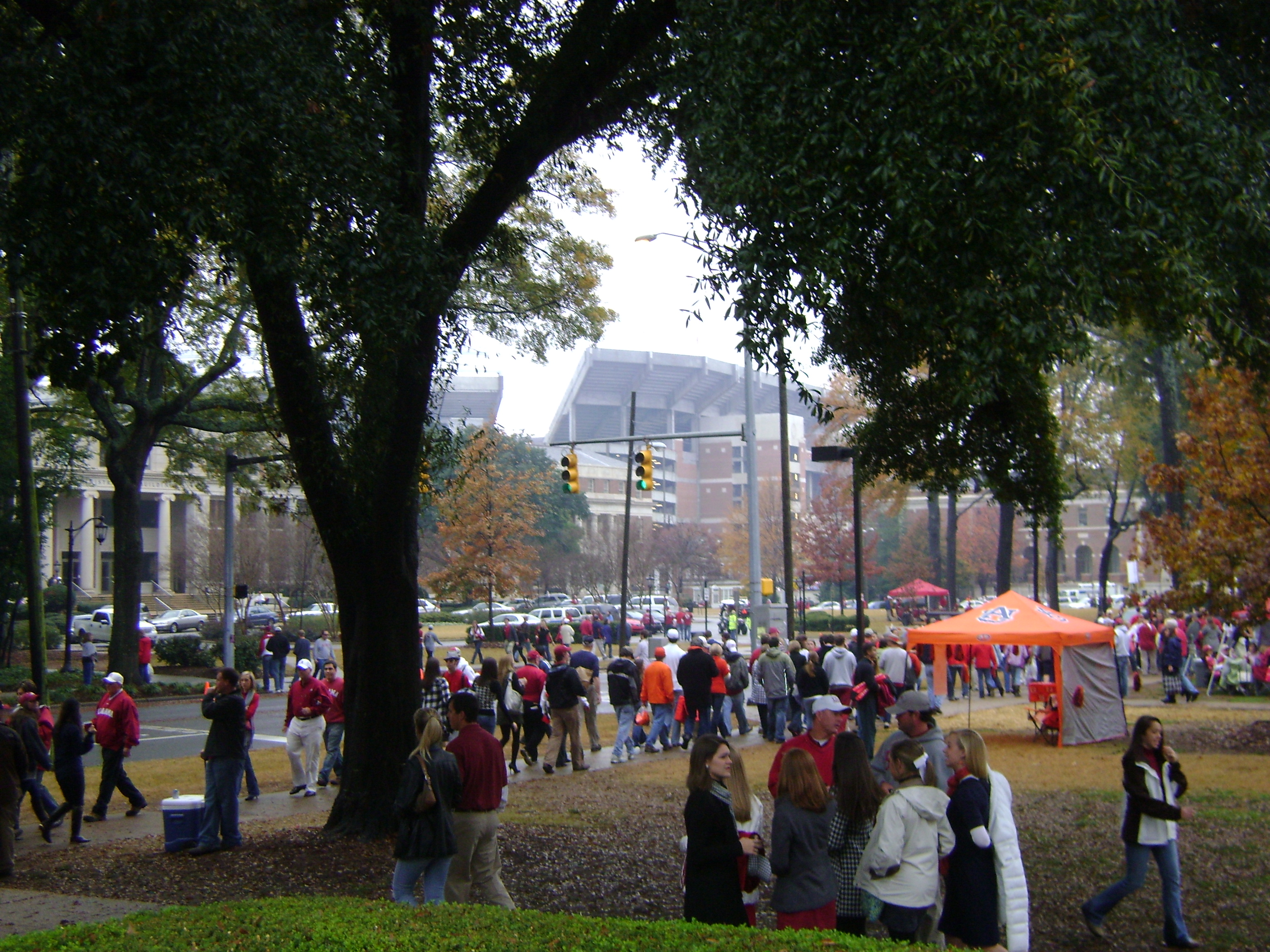
View of the northern side of the stadium (background) and tailgaters as seen from the Denny Chimes vicinity of The Quad in 2008

However, with the majority of past big games being played at Legion Field, Bryant–Denny Stadium has hosted many notable games, such as the 1994 high-scoring contest between Alabama's Jay Barker and Georgia's Eric Zeier, Marvin Constant's goal-line stop against LSU quarterback Josh Booty as time expired in 1999, Tyrone Prothro's reception over the back of Southern Miss defensive back Jasper Faulk in 2005, a 31–3 victory over No. 5 Florida in 2005, the Roman Harper-forced fumble against Tennessee in 2005 that helped the Crimson Tide to victory, Alabama's 36–0 shutout victory against Auburn in 2008 thus breaking the six-game losing streak and first ever Iron Bowl victory in Bryant–Denny Stadium, and Terrence Cody's field goal block against Tennessee as time expired in 2009. Bryant-Denny has also hosted notable losses, such as the 2010 Iron Bowl (commonly known as the "Camback"). NCAA Football 11 ranked Alabama's Bryant–Denny as the fourth toughest place to play in the nation and third in the SEC behind Florida and LSU. Sporting News ranks it first, while Bleacher Report has it ranked as the 5th toughest and the 2nd best stadium in the country.

== Field design ==
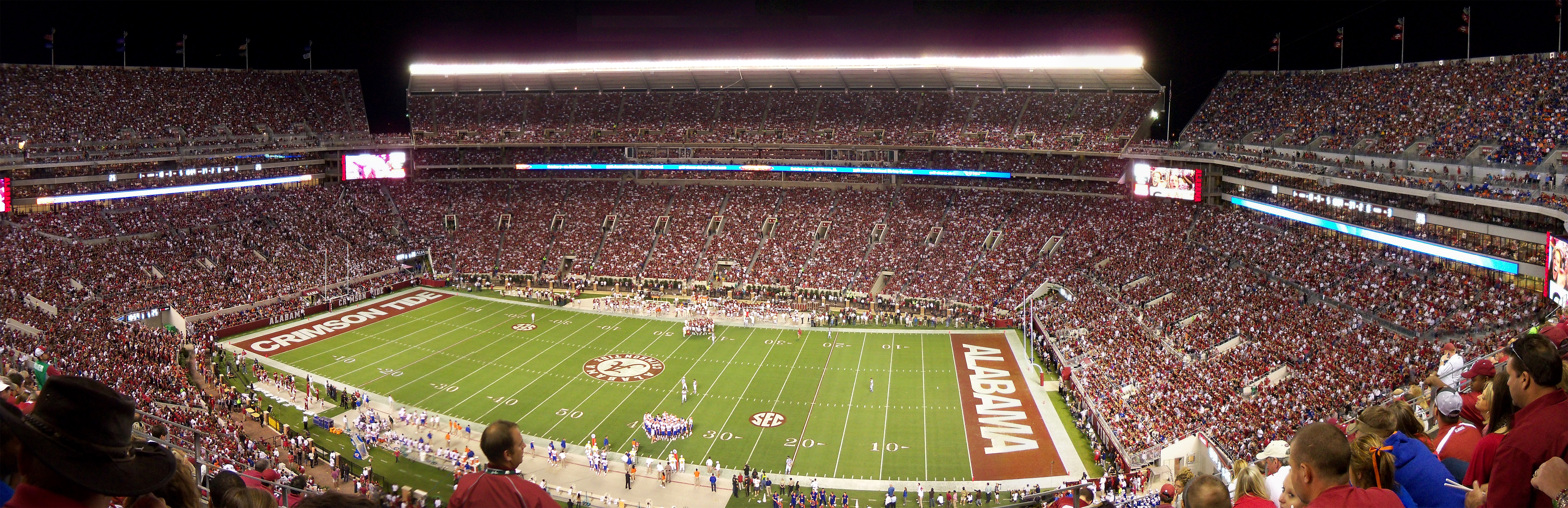
The interior of Bryant–Denny Stadium (south end zone, left) in 2010

Until the turn of the millennium, the field at Bryant–Denny Stadium had only the necessary markings required for play. As more and more stadiums began to add other designs to the field, such as logos, Alabama chose to remain traditional with the field design. In fact, even into the 2002 season, Bryant–Denny still had no logo at midfield and no logos at the 25-yard lines, which are now commonplace in many stadiums. The end zone design simply consisted of "ALABAMA" in a white, block-style font. During the 1992 season, however, a special logo was used at midfield to commemorate the centennial season of Alabama football.

During the 2002 season, however, a large white script "A" was added to midfield. The field design underwent full-scale changes beginning with the 2004 season. At midfield, the large white script "A" was replaced with the crimson script "A" logo, encircled by a crimson ring which has "Alabama Crimson Tide" written around it. In addition, the end zone designs were changed to a crimson block-style font outlined in white.

For the 2006 season, two identical logos commemorating the 175th anniversary of the university were also added to the field on the 25-yard lines. One was added on the south end of the stadium, on the west side of the playing field, while the other was on the north end of the stadium, on the east side of the playing field.

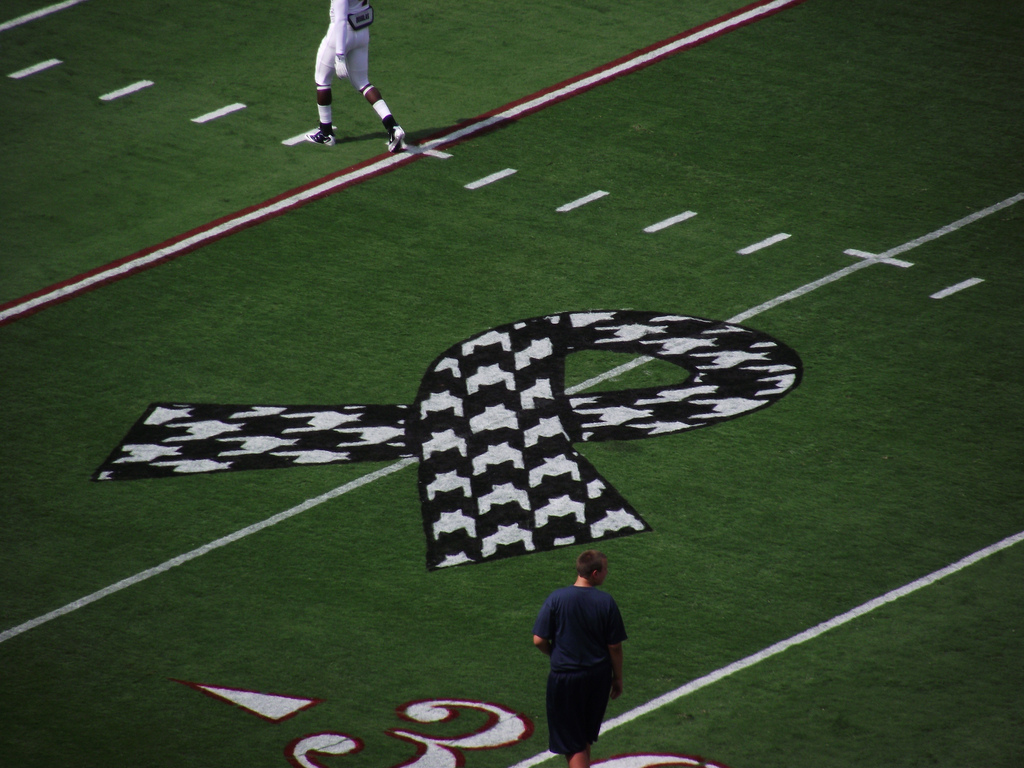
Detail of the houndstooth awareness ribbon painted on-field in remembrance of the victims and damage of the April 2011 tornado

For the 2007 season, two identical logos commemorating the 75th anniversary of the founding of the Southeastern Conference (SEC) were added to home field of every SEC team. These were in the same places as the 175th logos were during the 2006 season.

For the 2008 season, two identical SEC logos were added to the home field of every SEC team. Alabama's crimson was used as the primary color for the logos at Bryant–Denny. These logos were located in the same places as the previous logos and remain there today.

For the 2009 A-day game, the end zones were changed back to the original white block-style font that was used prior to the 2004 season, except that the background was shaded crimson. The north end zone displayed "ALABAMA", while the south end zone displayed "CRIMSON TIDE". This design layout has remained in use since the 2009 season.

For the 2011 season, two identical houndstooth awareness ribbons recognizing the ongoing relief efforts following the April 27, 2011 tornado were added to the field on the 25 yard lines.

== Locker rooms ==
In 2008, the visitors' locker room was officially named "The Fail Room" after alumnus and donor James M. Fail. He commented, "Earlier this year, when I saw the visitors' locker room as a potential naming right, I figured it was the most appropriate opportunity I would ever have to use my name."

== High school championships ==
Beginning in 2009, Bryant–Denny Stadium and Auburn University's Jordan–Hare Stadium became the homes of the Alabama High School Athletic Association state football championship games, known as the Super 7 (named for the number of AHSAA enrollment classes in football). The newly opened Protective Stadium in Birmingham was added to the Super 7 rotation in 2021. Under the current cycle, which ends in 2032, Birmingham hosts the event every third year from 2021 to 2030, with Bryant–Denny and Jordan–Hare alternating hosting duties in other years. Previously, the Super 6, reflecting the former AHSAA football classification structure, was held at Legion Field in Birmingham.

== Gallery ==
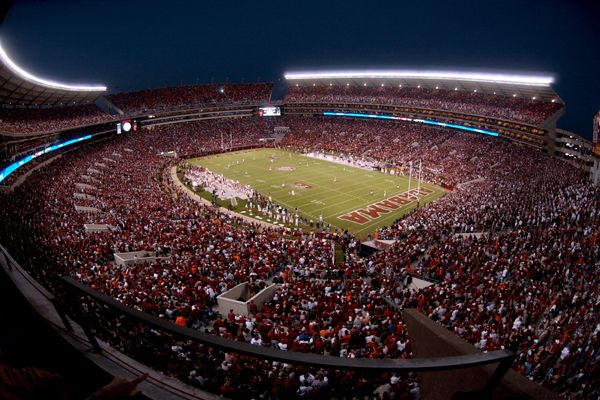
Iron Bowl 2006

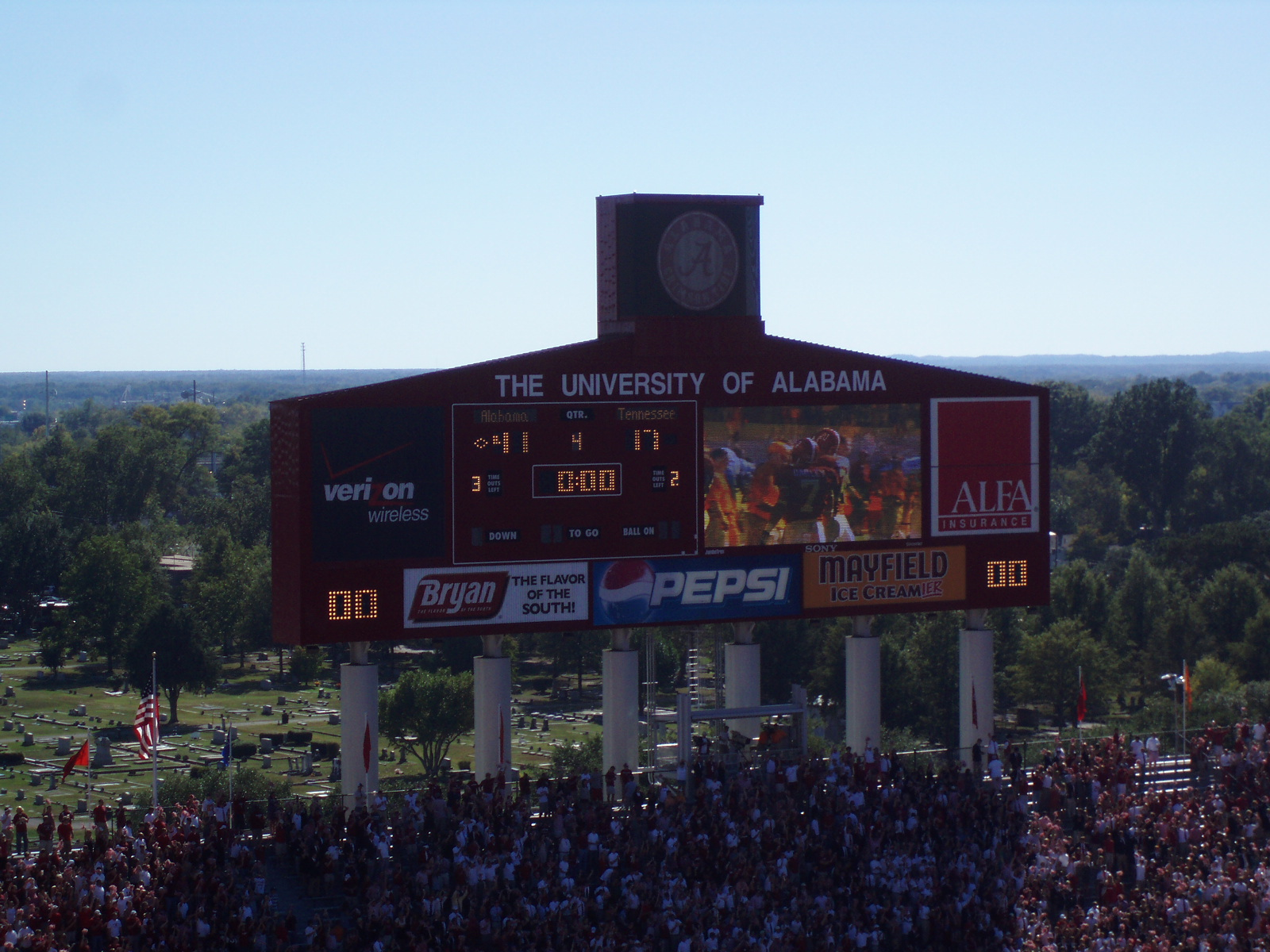
The south end zone scoreboard in 2007. Installed in 1998, the JumboTron was removed during 2009–2010 renovations.

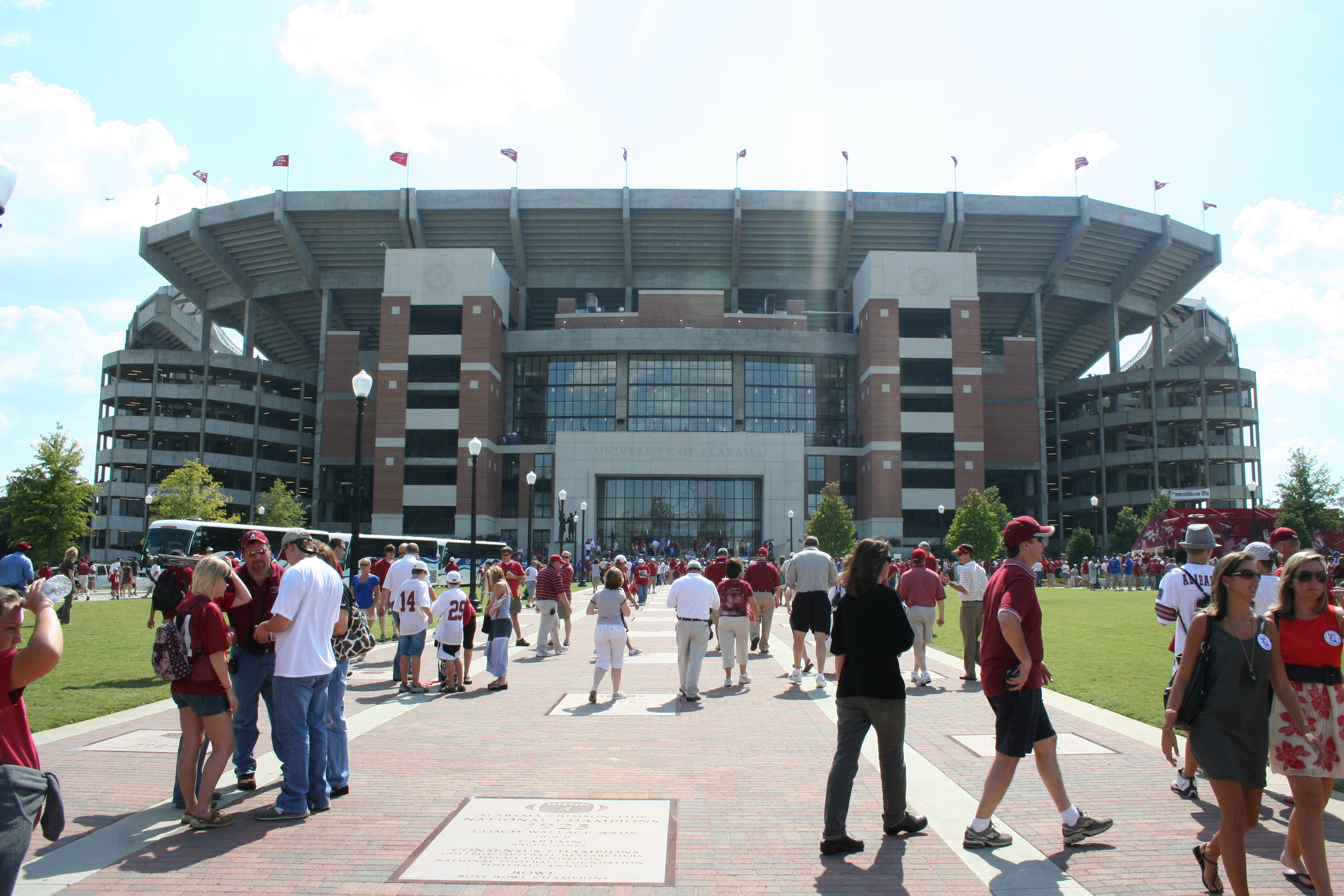
The Walk of Champions in 2008.

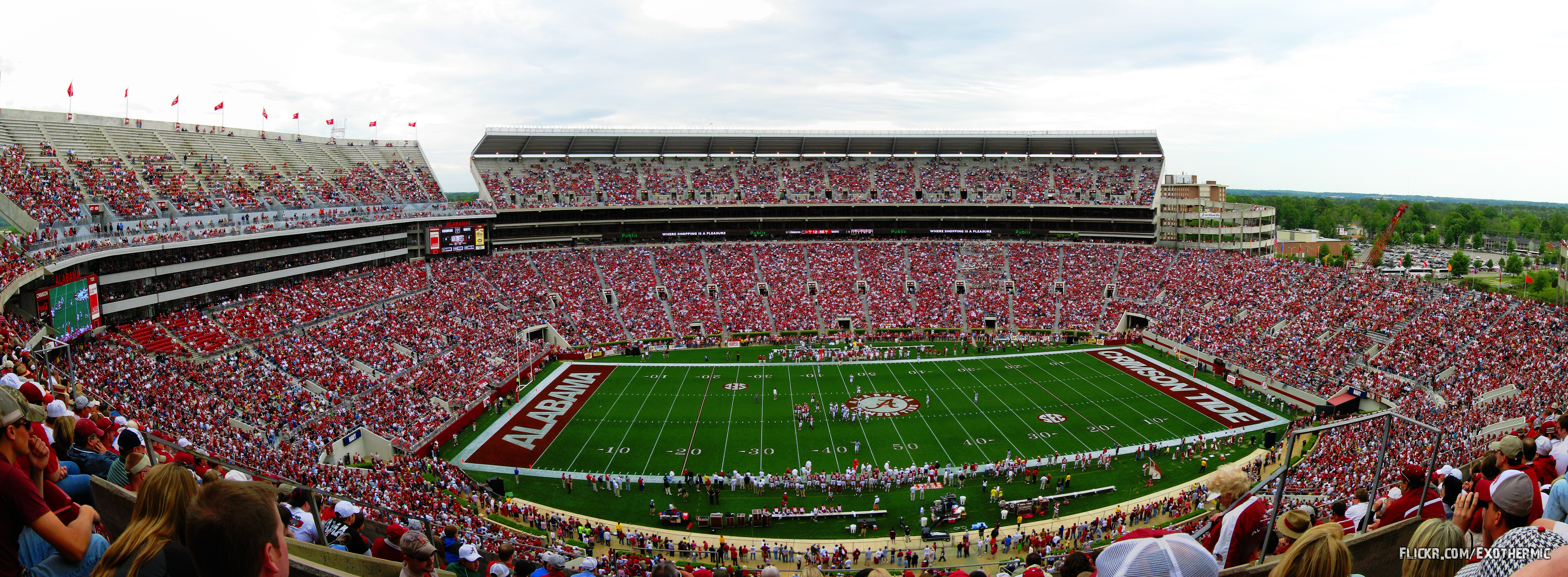
Panoramic view in 2009

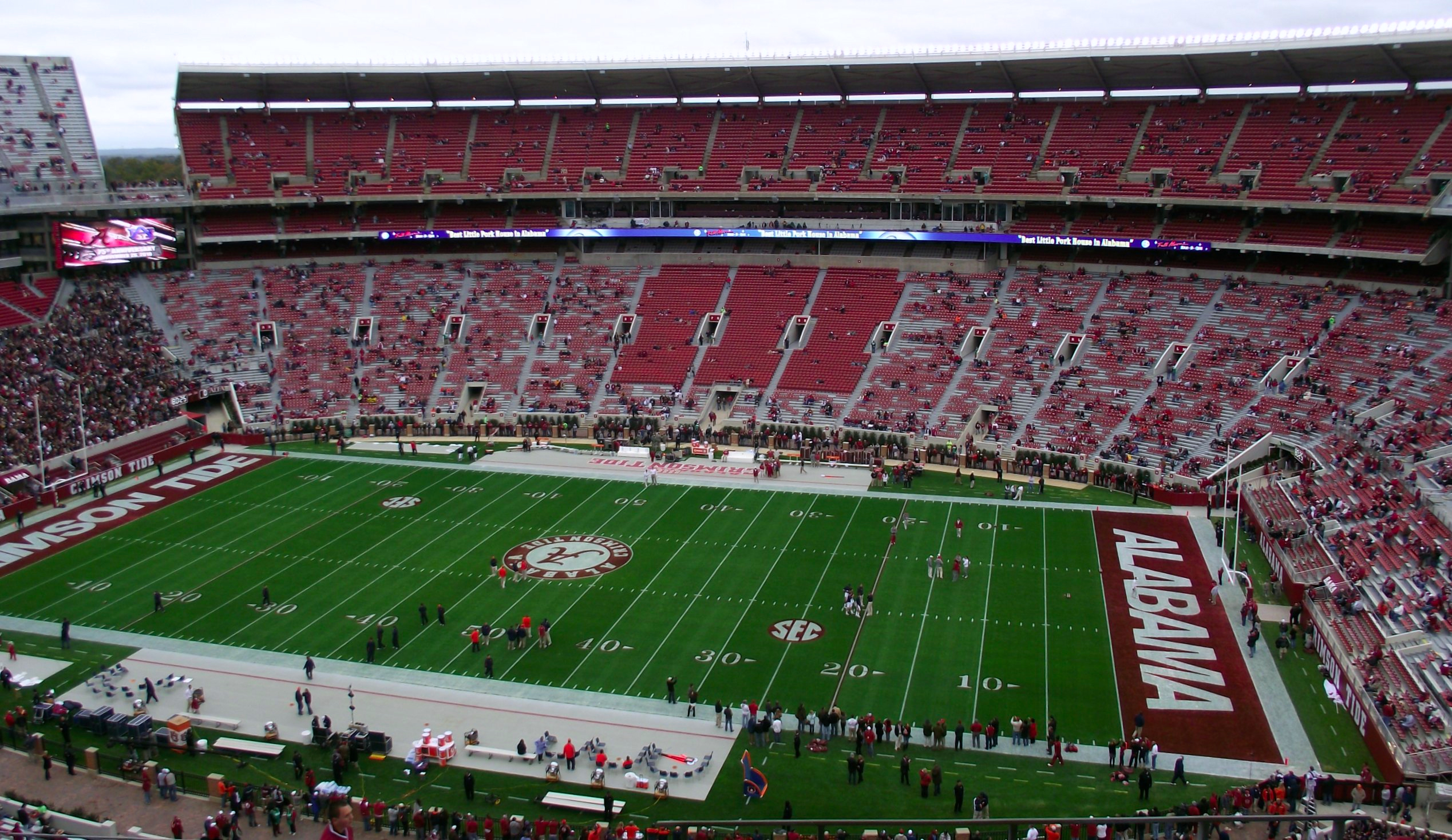
Looking west in 2010

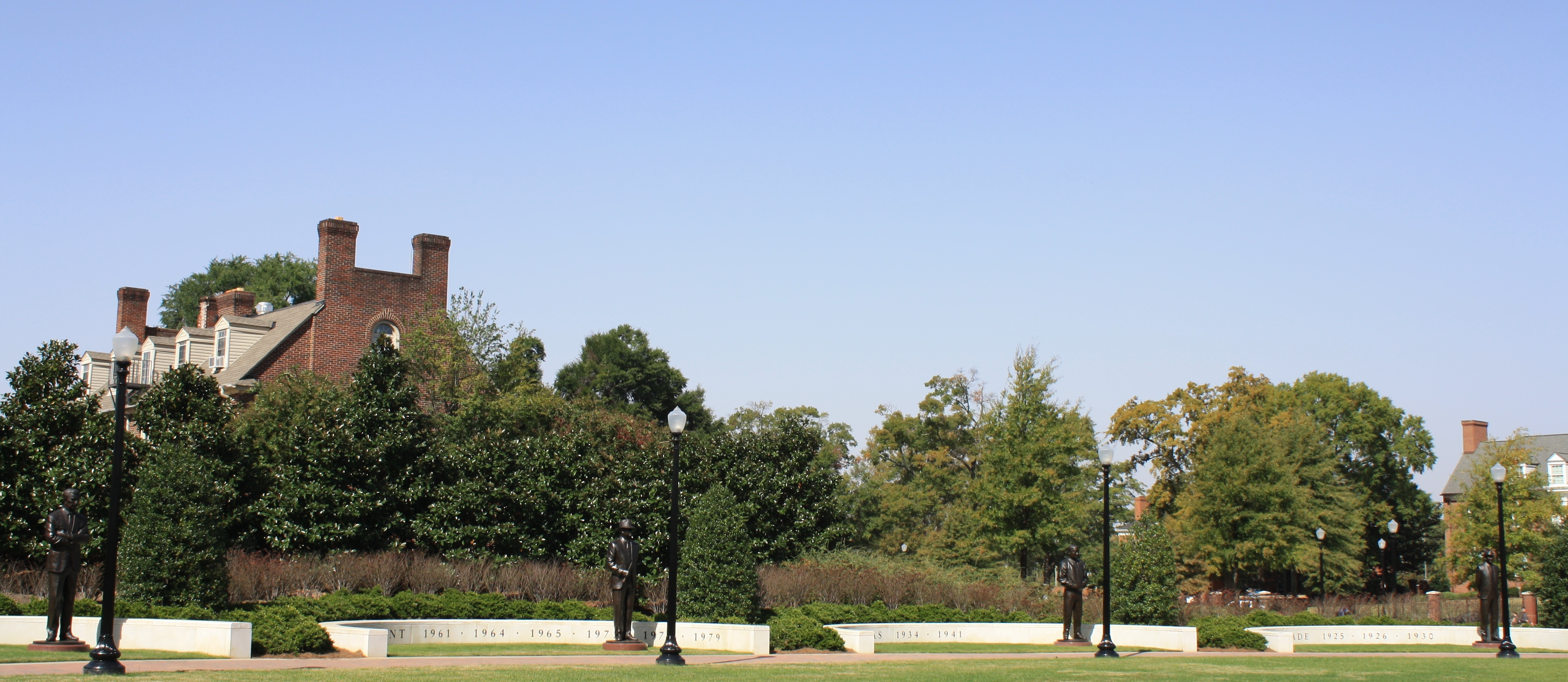
The "Coaches Walk" alongside the Walk of Champions in 2012. It features statues to prominent Crimson Tide football head coaches.

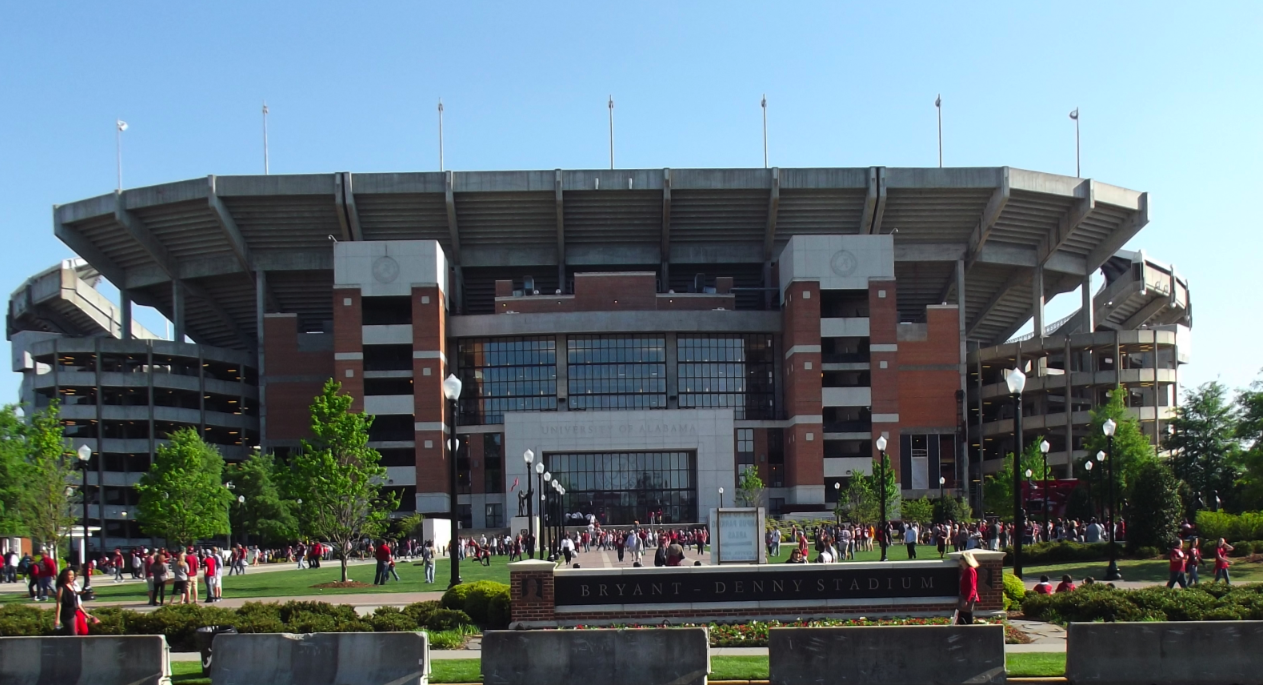
Bryant–Denny Stadium in April 2013

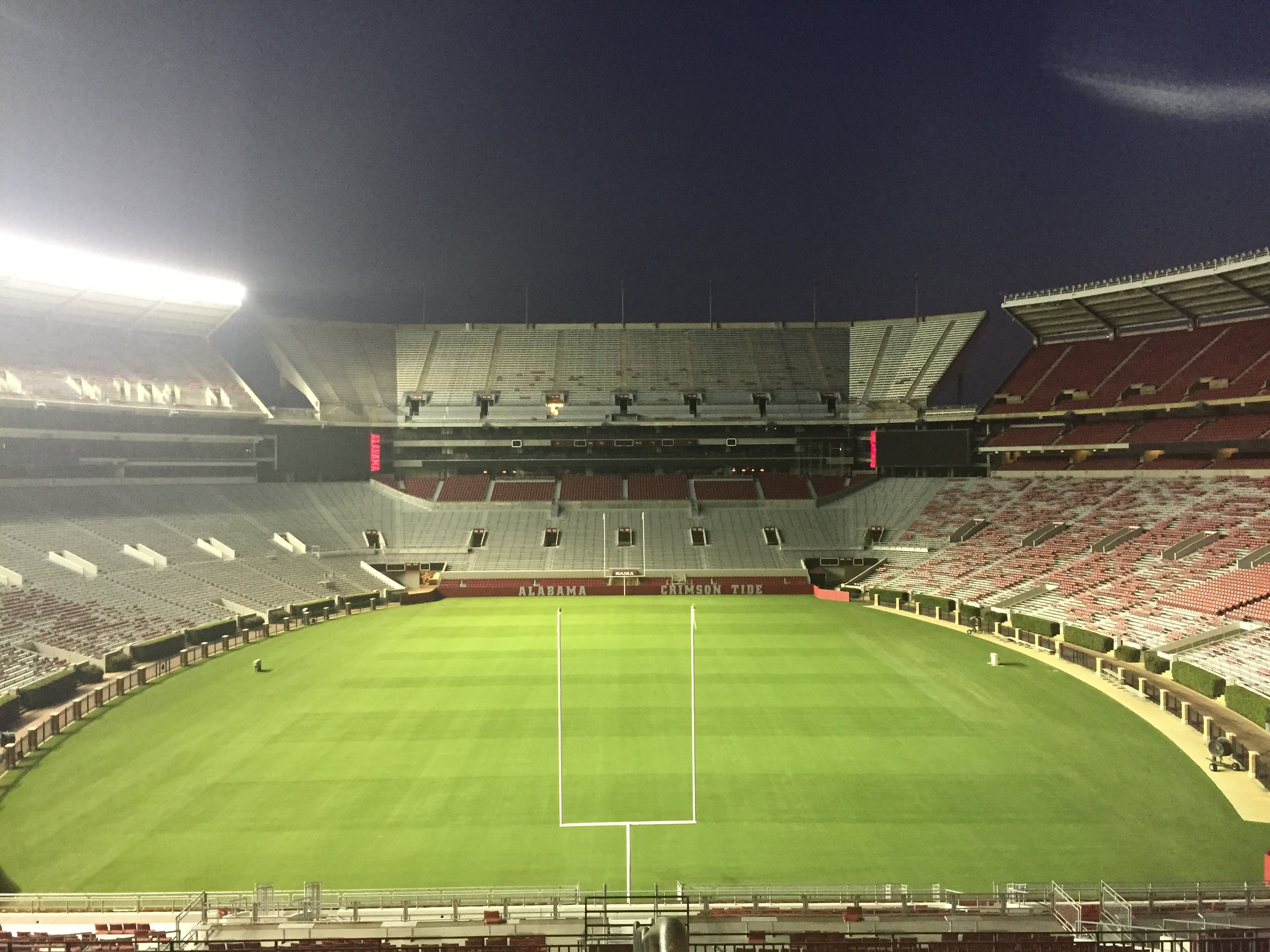
Interior at night during off-season, 2015

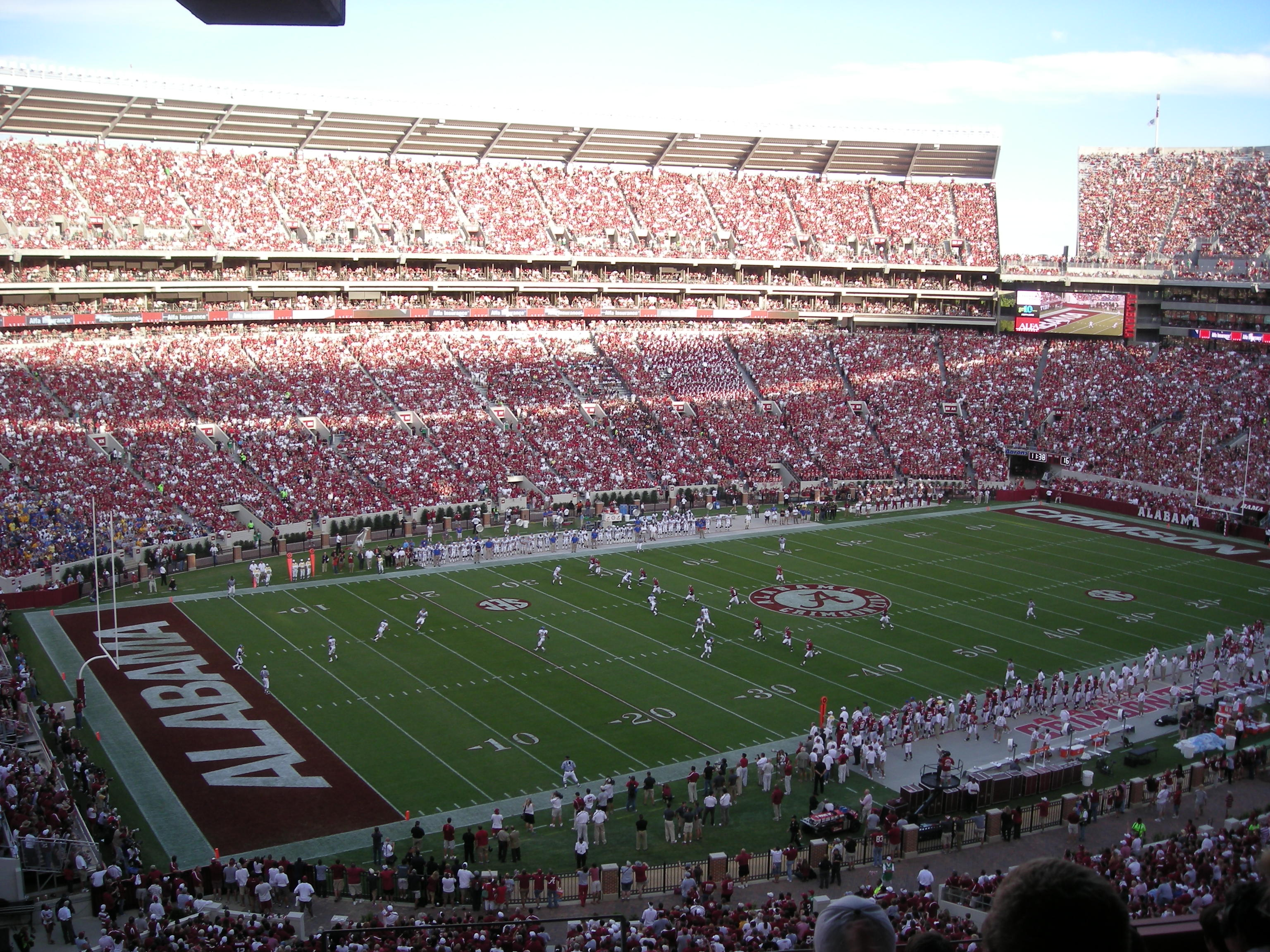
2010 Alabama vs San Jose State
