= Carlen House =

Historic house in Alabama, United States

- U.S. National Register of Historic Places
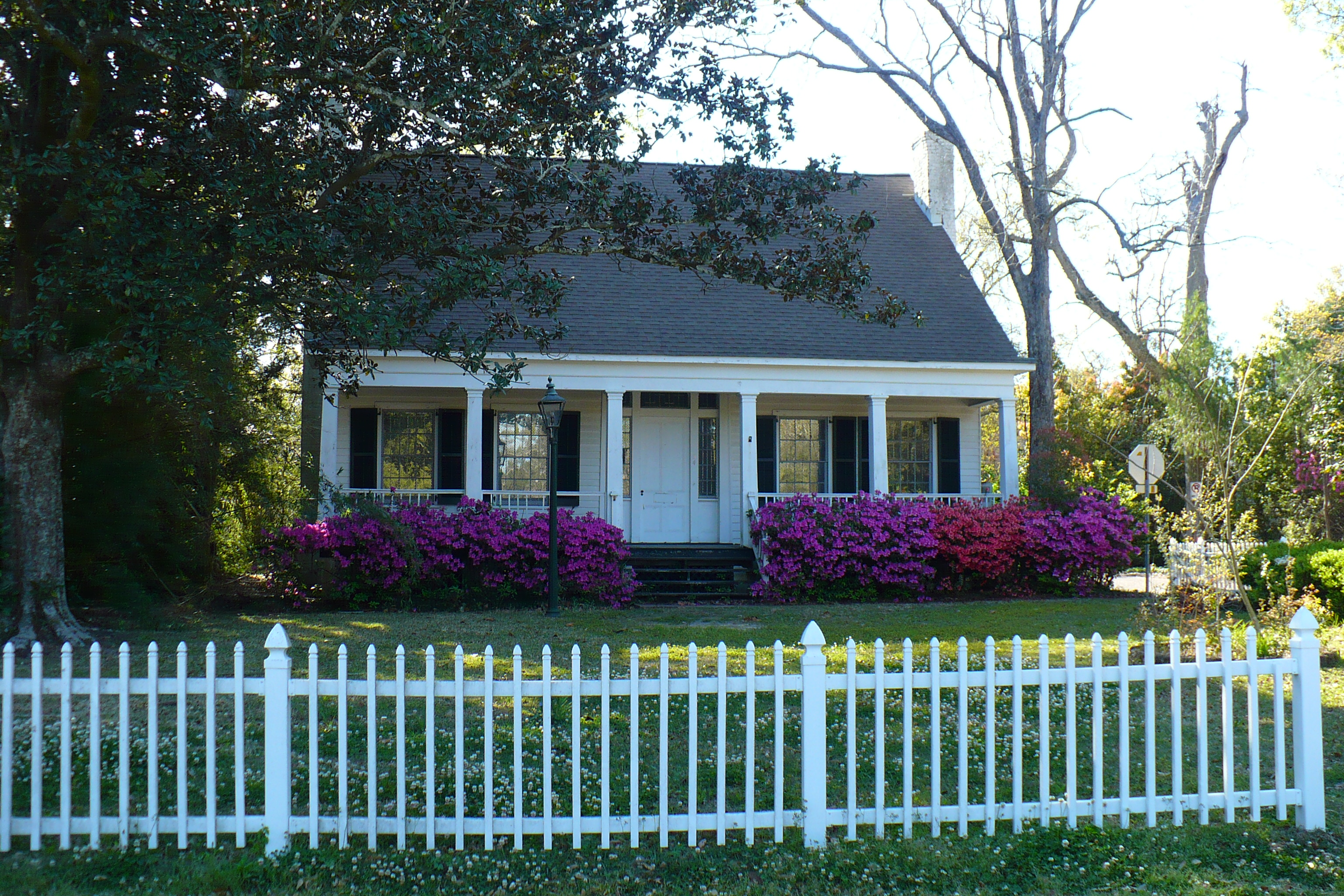
- The Carlen House in 2008.

- Location within Mobile, Alabama Location within Alabama Location within the United States
- Location: 54 South Carlen Street; Mobile, Alabama
- Coordinates: 30°41′3″N 88°5′10″W
- Area: 0.2 acres (0.081 ha)
- Built: 1843
- Architectural style: Gulf Coast cottage
- NRHP reference No.: 81000131
- Added to NRHP: June 12, 1981

The Carlen House, also known as the Carlen House Museum, is a historic house museum in Mobile, Alabama, United States. The house was built in the Gulf Coast cottage style in 1843. It was the residence of Michael and Mary Carlen, Irish immigrants, and their twelve children. Operated as a farm during the 19th century, the Mobile County School Board acquired 38 acres (15 ha) of the property from the Carlen family in 1923 as the site for a new public city school. As a result, the house is now on the northern edge of the Murphy High School campus. It was placed on the National Register of Historic Places on June 12, 1981.

The house is currently not open to the public, however is used by the Murphy High School students on occasion.
