= Murphy High School (Alabama) =

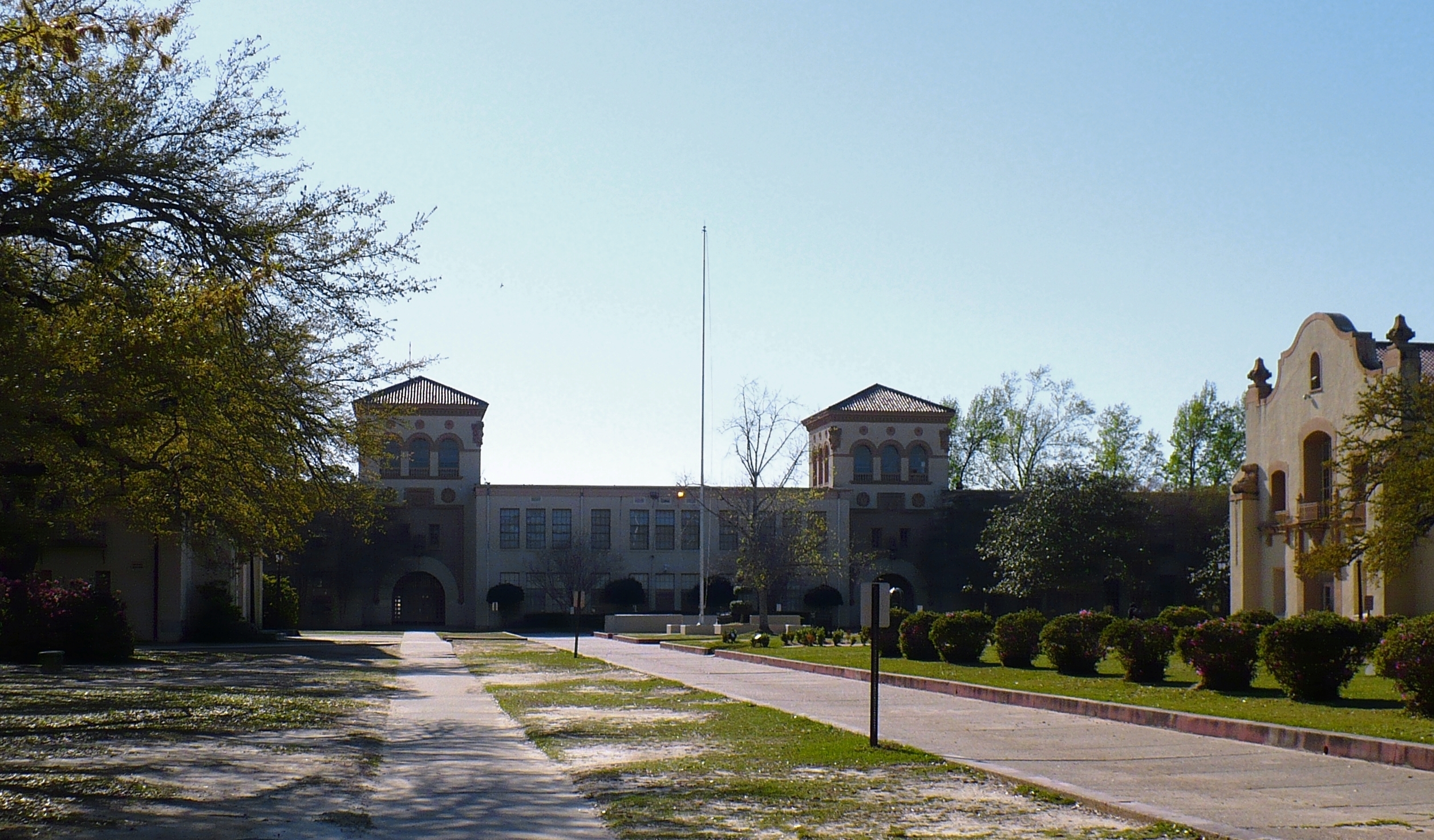

Location
- 100 South Carlen Street; Mobile, Alabama 36606; United States; 30°40′58″N 88°05′11″W

Information
- Type: Public high school
- Established: April 26, 1926 (100 years ago)
- CEEB code: 011830
- Principal: Ed Sanderson
- Teaching staff: 76.00 (FTE)
- Enrollment: 1,255 (2023–2024)
- Student to teacher ratio: 16.51
- Education system: Mobile County Public School System
- Campus type: Urban
- Colors: Blue and gold
- Mascot: Panther
- Rival: McGill–Toolen Catholic High School
- Newspaper: The Murphy Hi Times
- Yearbook: Mohian
- Website: www.mhspanthers.com
- Murphy High School
- U.S. National Register of Historic Places
- Area: 27.6 acres (11.2 ha)
- Built: 1926
- Architect: Perkins, Fellows, and Hamilton; Rogers, George B.
- Architectural style: Spanish Colonial Revival
- NRHP reference No.: 82001612
- Added to NRHP: November 4, 1982

Murphy High School, in Mobile, Alabama, is a public high school operated by the Mobile County Public School System that educates grades 9–12.

== History ==
=== Founding and early history ===
In 1922, the Mobile County Public School System (MCPSS) began to plan for the construction of a new high school that would serve the entire county, as the facilities of the now venerable 80 years old Barton Academy structure of Greek Revival architecture, in downtown, were becoming overcrowded and suffering from inadequate maintenance and difficult to maintain. In 1923 the Mobile County School Board acquired 38 acres (15.4 ha) from the Carlen family for the site of their proposed high school complex.

The cornerstone of the school was laid on December 14, 1925, and on April 26, 1926, Mobile High School opened. Construction costs totaled $850,000 for the first six buildings with an additional $200,000 spent on the gymnasium and the indoor pool installed in 1930. Two years after its opening the school's name was changed to Murphy High School in honor of Samuel Silenus Murphy, MCPSS superintendent from 1900 to 1926. While still called Mobile High School, the yearbook had been called the Mobile High Annual. At the change of the name to Murphy High School, the workers did not want to change the name of the yearbook. They agreed to shorten the name to Mohian, a shortened version of Mobile High Annual. The school's colors are gold and blue. Their mascot is a panther.

=== Desegregation ===
The school was desegregated in 1963 when three African American students brought a case against the Mobile County School Board for being denied admission to the then all-white school. The court ordered that the three students be admitted to Murphy for the 1964 school year. By the fall of 1970, following stringent desegregation efforts in Alabama, 1,500 of the school's 2,140 students were African American. At the same time, the school had 34 African American teachers on its 87-member faculty.

=== National recognition ===
In 1982 Murphy High School was placed on the National Register of Historic Places by the U.S. Department of the Interior. In 1987 it was selected as a Presidential Model School by the U.S. Department of Education. Redbook magazine named Murphy as one of the top high schools in the United States and one of the largest high schools in Alabama in 1994. Murphy students were featured in the Seventeen magazine issue for November 1996 fashion trends in high school. Several students from the classes of 1997 and 1998 were included in the magazine.

=== Christmas Day tornado ===
On December 25, 2012, Murphy High School was hit directly by an EF2 wedge tornado, which caused significant damage to the campus. Students and faculty were relocated. They finished the remainder of the 2012 school year at the former Shaw High School in west Mobile while the Murphy campus was rebuilt. On August 19, 2013, the renovated storm-damaged high school campus reopened.

== Academics ==
Murphy has 14 Advanced Placement courses, the International Baccalaureate program, and the International Baccalaureate Diploma Programme.

== Notable alumni ==
- Buddy Aydelette, former NFL player, Green Bay Packers
- James M. Fail, philanthropist
- Neil Farrell Jr., NFL defensive tackle, Kansas City Chiefs
- Gordon T. Gould, US Air Force lieutenant general
- Kathryn P. Hire, NASA astronaut
- Frank Howard, former football head coach and athletic director for the Clemson Tigers
- Bobby Jackson, former NFL player
- Michael Jefferson, American football wide receiver
- Joey Jones, NFL player and NCAA coach
- Alex Lincoln, former Auburn University and San Francisco 49ers linebacker
- Ivan Maisel, college football writer for ESPN
- Jim Mason, former MLB player (Washington Senators, Texas Rangers, New York Yankees, Toronto Blue Jays, Montreal Expos)
- Keith McCants, former football player for the University of Alabama and the Tampa Bay Buccaneers.
- Mardye McDole, former NFL player, Minnesota Vikings
- Captain Munnerlyn, former NFL player, Carolina Panthers
- Solomon Patton, former NFL player
- Sidney Phillips, US Marine
- Dennison Robinson, Former Arena Football League player for the Chicago Rush
- Phil Savage, Philadelphia Eagle Player Personnel Executive, Senior Bowl Executive Director
- Billy Shipp, former NFL and CFL player
- Don Siegelman, former governor of the state of Alabama
- Cleo Simmons, former NFL player
- Eugene Sledge, US Marine, author, professor
- Leighton W. Smith Jr., admiral in US Navy
- Taylor Stallworth, former NFL defensive tackle
- John Steber, former NFL player
- Mickey Sutton, former NFL player
- Erick Walder, long jumper, Olympic silver medal, 1997 Athens
- Clifton "C. C." Williams, NASA astronaut and US Marine
- Jerrel Wilson, former NFL player Kansas City Chiefs, Mississippi Sports Hall of Fame 2011
