= Les Studdard =

American football player (born 1958)

No. 64, 68
- Position: Center

Personal information
- Born: December 14, 1958 (age 67); El Paso, Texas, U.S.
- Listed height: 6 ft 4 in (1.93 m)
- Listed weight: 260 lb (118 kg)

Career information
- High school: Pearsall (TX)
- College: Texas
- NFL draft: 1981: 10th round, 262nd overall pick

Career history
- Kansas City Chiefs (1982); Philadelphia Eagles (1983)*; Houston Oilers (1983)-(1984)*
- * Offseason or practice squad member only

Awards and highlights
- First-team All-SWC (1980)

Career NFL statistics
- Games played: 15
- Games started: 2
- Stats at Pro Football Reference

Les Studdard (born December 14, 1958) is an American former professional football player who was a center in the National Football League (NFL). He played for the Kansas City Chiefs in 1982 and for the Houston Oilers in 1983. He played college football for the Texas Longhorns.

He is the younger brother of former Denver Broncos offensive tackle Dave Studdard and the uncle of former NFL offensive lineman Kasey Studdard.

At the University of Texas at Austin, he was an All-Southwest Conference center in 1980. He was then selected 262nd overall by the Chiefs in the 10th round of the 1981 NFL draft. He spent the 1981 season on the injured reserve.

He became the starting center for the Chiefs for two games after center Jack Rudnay, had arthroscopic surgery on his left knee. At the end of the season he was selected to receive the Mack Lee Hill Award given to the Chiefs first-year player who best exemplifies the spirit and dedication of the late Hill, a running back with the Chiefs in 1964–65.

After the Chiefs drafted Bob Rush from San Diego during the 1983 off season, Studdard was traded to the Philadelphia Eagles for an undisclosed draft choice. Two days later he was cut by the Eagles. He was then signed by the Oilers, which whom he played in 6 games.

After the 1983–84 season he became a free agent, but in the summer of 1984 he was re-signed by the Oilers, but he did not see any playing time that season.
