= James M. Fail =

American financier

- Born: March 28, 1926; Mobile, Alabama, US
- Died: February 26, 2010 (aged 83); Tuscaloosa, Alabama, US
- Education: University of Alabama
- Occupation: Financial executive

James M. Fail (March 28, 1926 – February 26, 2010) was an American financial executive who served as chairman of Stone Holdings, Inc. and Bluebonnet Savings Bank. A native of Mobile, Alabama, he attended Murphy High School and served for three years in the U.S. Navy. After graduating from the University of Alabama in 1949, he began his career as a securities salesman for Merrill Lynch. In the following decades, Fail and his holding companies have owned and operated a variety of investment, mortgage, banking, savings and loan, and insurance businesses throughout the U.S.

Fail was thrust into public attention in 1990, when the Senate Judiciary Antitrust Subcommittee held hearings scrutinizing his business activities, in particular his acquisition of a federally funded thrift despite a prior indictment for fraud and the criminal conviction of his company. More recently, he has been noted for a variety of philanthropic and community leadership efforts.

== Business history ==
Fail became Vice President of Commercial Mortgage Company in 1961 and President of Gulf South Mortgage and Investment Company in 1964. He founded Lifeshares Group, an insurance holding company, in 1970. From 1987 to 1997 he was owner and chairman of The Oklahoma Bank.

Fail was indicted for securities fraud in Alabama in 1976. As a result of a plea bargain, the charges against him personally were dropped; he pleaded guilty on behalf of his already-bankrupt company, and he was barred from doing any further business in Alabama. This incident would later provide the basis for further fraud charges against Fail brought by the FDIC.

In 1988, during the savings and loan crisis, the Federal Home Loan Bank Board approved the Southwest Plan, a program to provide government assistance to induce private capital investors to bail out failed savings and loans in the southwestern United States. While owner of CFSB Corporation, now known as Stone Capital, Inc., Fail acquired one such package of 15 insolvent thrifts, the Pard/Rose package. These were merged into a single thrift and renamed Bluebonnet. As a result of regulatory changes in 1989, Fail has been pursuing a Winstar suit against the federal government for an amount on the order of $100 million, which was still running as of 2006.

In order to buy Bluebonnet, in September 1988, Fail borrowed $34 million from Mutual Security Life Insurance Co., a Fort Wayne, Indiana company he had bought the previous year while it was struggling with debt. Mutual Security became insolvent in August 1990 and moved its headquarters to Lincoln, Nebraska and Dallas, Texas; its Indiana business was seized by state regulators, prompting BusinessWeek to describe 130,000 policyholders as "in limbo". Also in 1990, another of Fail's insurance companies, Farm and Home Life Insurance, failed and was placed in receivership by the Arizona Department of Insurance. In March 1992, Arizona sued Fail and his deputies for civil racketeering fraud in an amount in excess of the company's $101 million insolvency, alleging that "Mr. Fail and others were engaged in an elaborate scheme to drain millions of dollars out of the company...", resulting in its failure. The case was settled for $78.8 million.

The Senate Judiciary Subcommittee on Antitrust, Competition Policy and Consumer Rights investigated the Bluebonnet deal in 1990 to determine, among other questions, why Fail's bid succeeded despite the 1976 fraud conviction of his company, which should have been a "presumptive disqualifier" per FHLBB regulations. Initially, most of the criticism came from chairman Howard Metzenbaum, who described the deal as "an abomination, the worst case we have found" among the savings and loan bailouts. When Fail admitted to incorrect disclosures of his legal history, Senators Arlen Specter and Orrin Hatch also voiced their concerns. Author Marin Lowy, in his 1991 analysis of the situation, describes the hearings as exaggerated and "political hay." At the same time, Lowy expresses doubt towards Fail's "business morals" and trustworthiness with federal aid, concluding that thanks to the public scrutiny, "there's little likelihood that Mr. Fail can or will loot Bluebonnet," and in this sense, the public good had ultimately been served.

Bluebonnet maintained a profitable banking profile through 2003 when it opted to liquidate its assets.

== Philanthropy and community involvement ==
Fail has served as a Director of the Beneficial Mortgage Company, a member of the Economic Club of New York and a founder of its Centennial Society, and a Director of the Phoenix Symphony. In 1997 he established The Patsy and Jim Fail Scholarship at Birmingham–Southern College for "any worthy and deserving student". In 2007 Fail donated $200,000 to the Mobile Symphony, endowing its principal cello chair in memory of his wife.

Fail has repeatedly given to the Crimson Tide Foundation, the non-profit arm of the University of Alabama's athletic department. The department's media suite is named for Fail's father-in-law, Naylor Stone. In 2008, the visitor's locker room at Bryant–Denny Stadium was officially named "The Fail Room" in his honor. Fail commented, "Earlier this year when I saw the visitors' locker room as a potential naming right, I figured it was the most appropriate opportunity I would ever have to use my name."

Other donation recipients include the UAB School of Medicine, St. Paul's Academy, the Metropolitan Museum of Art, the University of Alabama Collegiate Fund, the Alabama Symphony, and Kappa Sigma Beta.
