= Ross Sorce =

American football player (1920–1959)

- Sorce, circa 1939

No. 81
- Position: Tackle

Personal information
- Born: June 17, 1920; Pittsburgh, Pennsylvania, U.S.
- Died: December 28, 1959 (aged 39); Bethel, Pennsylvania, U.S.
- Listed height: 6 ft 4 in (1.93 m)
- Listed weight: 255 lb (116 kg)

Career information
- High school: Central Catholic (Pittsburgh)
- College: Georgetown (1939–1942)
- NFL draft: 1943: undrafted

Career history
- Pittsburgh Steelers (1945)
- Stats at Pro Football Reference

Ross Paul Sorce Jr. (June 17, 1920 – December 28, 1959) was an American professional football tackle who played for the Pittsburgh Steelers of the National Football League (NFL). He played college football for the Georgetown Hoyas.

== Early life ==
Ross Paul Sorce Jr. was born on June 17, 1920, in Pittsburgh, Pennsylvania. He played high school football at Central Catholic High School in Pittsburgh, and was a team captain. He was class president as a sophomore, junior, and senior.

== College career ==
Sorce enrolled at Georgetown University to play college football for the Hoyas. He was on the freshman team in 1939 and the varsity team from 1940 to 1942 at tackle. At 270 pounds in 1939, Sorce was believed to be one of the biggest freshman football players in the country.

== Professional career ==
Sorce signed with the Pittsburgh Steelers in 1945. Sorce and Glen Stough were the tallest players on the team that year. Sorce played in one game for the Steelers as a reserve tackle.

== Personal life ==
Sorce died on December 28, 1959, in Bethel, Pennsylvania. At the time of his death, he was an appliance manager for Sears.
