= Clyde Smith (American football) =

American football player and coach (1904–1982)

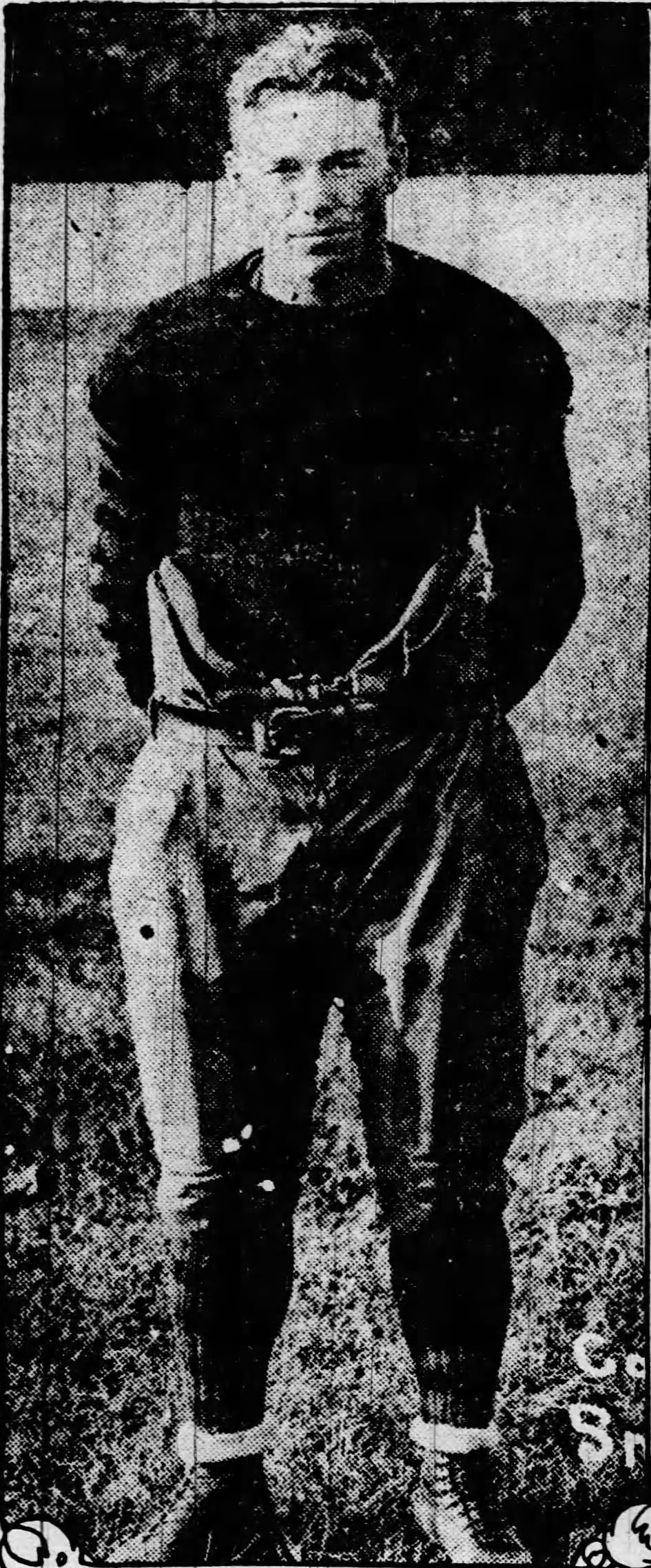
- Smith as Missouri Tigers football team captain in 1923

Profile
- Position: Center

Personal information
- Born: July 17, 1904; Steelville, Missouri, U.S.
- Died: December 30, 1982 (aged 78); Lawrenceville, Illinois, U.S.
- Listed height: 5 ft 10 in (1.78 m)
- Listed weight: 184 lb (83 kg)

Career information
- High school: Sapulpa (Sapulpa, Oklahoma)
- College: Missouri

Career history

Playing
- Kansas City Cowboys (1925–1926); Columbus Tigers (1927); Providence Steam Roller (1928)

Coaching
- College of Emporia (1931–1934) (head coach)

Awards and highlights
- 3× All-Pro (1926–1928)

Career statistics
- Games played: 33
- Games started: 31

Clyde Wise Smith (July 17, 1904 – December 30, 1982) was an American football player and coach. He played professionally as a center for four seasons in the National Football League (NFL) with the Kansas City Cowboys (1925–1926), the Columbus Tigers (1927), and the Providence Steam Roller (1928). Smith served as the head football coach at the College of Emporia in Emporia, Kansas for four seasons, from 1931 to 1934, compiling a record of 10–19–4.

Smith later coached football at Bridgeport High School in Bridgeport, Illinois. He owned the Lawrenceville Greenhouses, was chaired the Lawrence Country Housing authority, and was a board member of the Lawrence County Chamber of Commerce. Smith died on December 30, 1982, at his home in Lawrenceville, Illinois.

His brother, Ray, also played in the NFL.

== Head coaching record ==
Year	Team	Overall	Conference	Standing	Bowl/playoffs
College of Emporia Fighting Presbies (Central Intercollegiate Conference) (1931–1933)
1931	College of Emporia	2–6	1–5	7th	
1932	College of Emporia	2–5–1	2–3–1	4th	
1933	College of Emporia	4–3–2	1–3–2	6th	
College of Emporia Fighting Presbies (Kansas Collegiate Athletic Conference) (1934)
1934	College of Emporia	2–5–1	2–2–1	4th	
College of Emporia:		10–19–4	6–13–4		
Total:		10–19–4			
