= Bronko Smilanich =

American football player (1915–)

No. 21
- Position: Halfback

Personal information
- Born: October 7, 1915; Chisholm, Minnesota, U.S.
- Died: April 11, 2001 (aged 85); Pasadena, California, U.S.
- Listed height: 5 ft 11 in (1.80 m)
- Listed weight: 180 lb (82 kg)

Career information
- High school: Chisholm
- College: Arizona
- NFL draft: 1939: undrafted

Career history
- Cleveland Rams (1939); Cincinnati Bengals (1939)
- Stats at Pro Football Reference

Bronko Michael Smiland (October 7, 1915 – April 11, 2001), born Bronko Michael Smilanich, was an American professional football halfback who played for the Cleveland Rams of the National Football League (NFL). He played college football for the Arizona Wildcats.

== Early life ==
Bronko Michael Smilanich was born on October 7, 1915, in Chisholm, Minnesota. He attended Chisholm High School.

== College career ==
Smilanich enrolled at the University of Minnesota to play college football for the Golden Gophers. He was on the freshman team in 1935. Smilanich transferred to the University of Arizona, where he was a three-year letterman for the Wildcats from 1936 to 1938. Smilanich signed with the Cleveland Rams for the 1938 season but the University of Arizona protested, stating that Smilanich had one year of eligibility left. In April 1938, Smilanich said he had already left school and would be playing for the Rams in 1938. However, he ended up returning to the University of Arizona in time for the 1938 season. In July 1939, there was a voting campaign to elect Smilanich into the 1939 Chicago Charities College All-Star Game. A Spanish-language newspaper even ran an ad for Smilanich. Through July 15, he had 87,592 votes nationwide. Smilanich ended up winning a spot on the team.

== Professional career ==
Smilanich played in the first two regular season games of the 1939 season for the Rams, completing one of two passes for 11 yards while also rushing once for negative three yards. On September 23, 1939, it was reported that he had been released.

Smilanich then played in five games for the Cincinnati Bengals of the American Professional Football Association in 1939, scoring one rushing touchdown and one kick return touchdown.

== Personal life ==
After his football career, Smilanich moved to Los Angeles to work in the paint industry. He changed his name to Smiland for business purposes. He founded Smiland Paint Co. in 1966. He died on April 11, 2001, in Pasadena, California.
