= Mickey Sutton (safety) =

American football player (born 1943)

No. 40, 34
- Position: Safety

Personal information
- Born: July 17, 1943 (age 83); Mobile, Alabama, U.S.
- Listed height: 6 ft 0 in (1.83 m)
- Listed weight: 190 lb (86 kg)

Career information
- High school: Murphy (Mobile)
- College: Auburn (1961–1964)
- NFL draft: 1965: 7th round, 90th overall pick

Career history
- Houston Oilers (1966); Montreal Alouettes (1967–1968)

Career AFL statistics
- Games played: 5
- Stats at Pro Football Reference

Michael Thomas Sutton (born July 17, 1943) is an American former professional football player who was a safety for the Houston Oilers of the American Football League (AFL). After playing college football for the Auburn Tigers, Sutton was selected by the Chicago Bears in the seventh round of the 1965 NFL draft with the 90th overall pick. He played one season for the Oilers in 1966.
