= Ray Smith (center) =

American football player (1908–1984)

- Smith with the Cincinnati Reds in 1933

No. 11, 29
- Position: Center

Personal information
- Born: August 27, 1908; Missouri, U.S.
- Died: May 12, 1984 (aged 75); Tulsa, Oklahoma, U.S.
- Listed height: 5 ft 10 in (1.78 m)
- Listed weight: 195 lb (88 kg)

Career information
- High school: Sapulpa (Sapulpa, Oklahoma)
- College: Tulsa, Missouri

Career history
- Providence Steam Roller (1930); Portsmouth Spartans (1930); Providence Steam Roller (1931); Philadelphia Eagles (1933); Cincinnati Reds (1933)
- Stats at Pro Football Reference

Raymond Henry Smith (August 27, 1908 – May 12, 1984) was an American professional football center who played three seasons in the National Football League (NFL) with the Providence Steam Roller and Philadelphia Eagles. He played college football at the University of Tulsa and the University of Missouri.

== Early life and college ==
Raymond Henry Smith was born on August 27, 1908, in Missouri. He attended Sapulpa High School in Sapulpa, Oklahoma.

Smith was first a member of the Tulsa Golden Hurricane of the University of Tulsa. He then transferred to the University of Missouri, where he was a two-year letterman for the Missouri Tigers from 1928 to 1929.

== Professional career ==
Smith signed with the Providence Steam Roller of the National Football League (NFL) in 1930. He played in ten games, starting seven, for the Steam Roller during the 1930 season.

On November 19, 1930, Smith was signed off the Steam Roller by the Portsmouth Spartans. However, he did not appear in any games for the Spartans that year.

Smith returned to the Steam Roller in 1931 and started ten games that year.

He signed with the Philadelphia Eagles in 1933 and played in one game before being released.

Smith signed with the NFL's Cincinnati Reds in 1933 but did not play any games for them.

== Personal life ==
Smith's brother, Clyde, also played in the NFL. Ray Smith died on May 12, 1984, in Tulsa, Oklahoma.
