= Torin Smith =

American football player (born 1961)

Torin Nathaniel Smith (September 30, 1961 – October 29, 2021) was a professional American football player. He played one season in the National Football League. He later became a mentor, sports coach, and schoolteacher.

Smith attended Mesa Community College and he graduated from Hampton (Institute) University. Smith made his professional debut in the NFL in 1987 with the New York Giants. He played for the New York Giants for his entire 1-year career.

Smith was married to Regine Malebranche-Smith, a registered nurse who grew up in Quebec, Montreal. Together they had two sons Reggie and Torin Jr.

After football, he made a career out of working with juvenile delinquents, emotionally disturbed teenagers, mentoring, and being a bodyguard at rock concerts, and for celebrities.

Smith became a geography and civics teacher at Workman Middle School in Pensacola, Florida. He was also the head coach for the Workman Middle School Lady Jags basketball team and track club. During the 2011–2012 school year, the Lady Jags basketball team went undefeated (10–0) and won the Escambia County Middle School Basketball Championship. Also during the 2012 school year, the Lady Jags track club won the Escambia County Middle School Track Championship. He won his second Escambia County Basketball Championship during the 2014–2015 school year. The Lady Jags basketball team finish the season with a record of 11–1.

During this time, Smith was the athletic director at the Escambia County Boys and Girls Club. While there his basketball teams won multiple AAU sanctions basketball tournaments and championships.
