= Sapulpa High School =

Public high school in Sapulpa, Oklahoma

Coordinates: 35.999312°N 96.098783°W

Sapulpa High School is a public high school in Sapulpa, Oklahoma, United States serving 1,020 students in grades 10–12.

66% of the students are white, while 5% are black, 5% are Hispanic and 24% are American Indian.

== Athletics ==
Sapulpa High School has multiple athletic teams, including baseball, football, soccer, wrestling, softball, tennis, track and field, swimming, volleyball, and golf. Several known professional athletes have come out of Sapulpa High School - minor league baseball players Don Bacon and Brian Cardwell; Major League Baseball player Don Allen Wallace, who played 23 games with the California Angels in the 1967 season.

== Clubs and organizations ==
The school has many clubs and organizations, including the BIG BLUE BAND, Yearbook, Jazz Band, Syncopation Jazz Choir, Blue Blazed Marvels, Advanced Women's Choir, Applied Vocal Music, A.P.E.S., Color Guard, Winter Guard, Ping Pings, etc.

== Notable alumni ==
- Jerry Adair, former Major League Baseball player
- Hazel Ellis graduated in 2014 at the age of 81
- Ken Selby, restaurateur and educator
- Ray Smith, American football player
- Blake Stephens, ranch owner
- Mark Sumner "The Ecstatic Jumping Man" at Super Bowl 50 halftime show.
