= Lyman Smith (American football) =

American football player (born 1956)

No. 79
- Position: Defensive tackle

Personal information
- Born: September 24, 1956 (age 70); Portland, Oregon, U.S.
- Listed height: 6 ft 5 in (1.96 m)
- Listed weight: 250 lb (113 kg)

Career information
- High school: Glen Head (NY) North Shore
- College: Duke
- NFL draft: 1978: 3rd round, 64th overall pick

Career history
- Minnesota Vikings (1978)
- Stats at Pro Football Reference

Lyman Smith (born September 24, 1956) is an American former professional football player who was a defensive tackle for the Minnesota Vikings of the National Football League (NFL) in 1978 after being a third round draft pick by the Miami Dolphins. He played college football for the Duke Blue Devils.
