= Larry Steele (American football) =

American football player (born 1950)

No. 17
- Positions: Punter, running back

Personal information
- Born: January 5, 1950 (age 76); Santa Rosa, California, U.S.
- Listed height: 5 ft 10 in (1.78 m)
- Listed weight: 182 lb (83 kg)

Career information
- High school: Santa Rosa
- College: Santa Rosa
- NFL draft: 1974: undrafted

Career history
- Denver Broncos (1974); New York Jets (1975)*; Denver Broncos (1977)*
- * Offseason or practice squad member only
- Stats at Pro Football Reference

Larry Clinton Steele (born January 5, 1950) is an American former professional football player for the Denver Broncos of the National Football League (NFL). He played college football at Santa Rosa Junior College.

== Early life ==
Larry Clinton Steele was born on January 5, 1950, in Santa Rosa, California. He played high school football at Santa Rosa High School as a tailback and punter. He also participated in track and graduated in 1968.

== College career ==
In 1968, Steele enrolled at Santa Rosa Junior College to play college football for the Bear Cubs. However, he left the team after one practice, deciding he did not want to play football anymore. He played for the Santa Rosa Junior College baseball team in 1969. That same year, he also played on local softball and basketball teams in the area.

Steele rejoined the Bear Cubs football team in 1971. He rushed for over 800 yards in both 1971 and 1972. He earned all-state honors in 1971 at running back. In 1973, Steele was averaging 48 yards per punt through three games before suffering a season-ending groin injury.

== Professional career ==
Steele signed with the Denver Broncos of the National Football League (NFL) on February 1, 1974, as a punter/running back. On August 7, it was reported that Steele had begun practicing at running back with Floyd Little away from the team due to the 1974 NFL players strike. Steele punted for the Broncos during the preseason games. He was released before the start of the 1974 regular season but immediately re-signed to the team. Steele played in one regular season game for the Broncos but did not record any statistics.

On December 19, 1974, Steele signed a two-year reserve/future contract with the New York Jets. He was released on August 12, 1975.

Steele signed with the Broncos again on March 14, 1977. He was released on August 8, 1977.

== Personal life ==
Steele's brother, Darrell Steele, was a running back at Utah State and tried out for the Oakland Raiders in 1965. Larry had a cancerous kidney removed in 1979. He played semi-pro football for the North Bay Rainbow/Breakers in 1982, and set a California Football League record with an 85-yard punt.
