= Kasey Studdard =

American football player (born 1984)

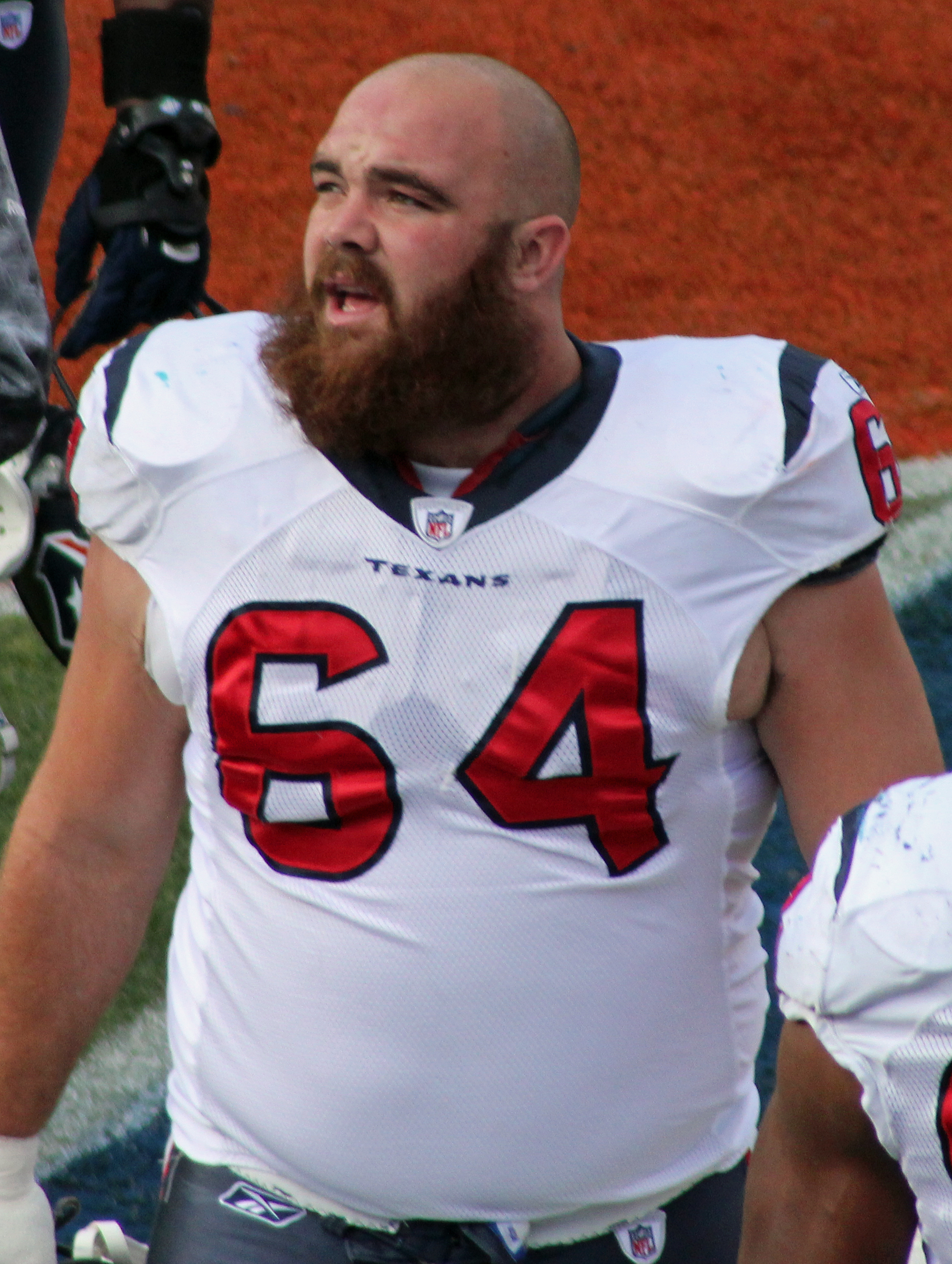
- Studdard with the Houston Texans in 2010

No. 64
- Position: Offensive guard

Personal information
- Born: July 1, 1984 (age 42); Denver, Colorado, U.S.
- Listed height: 6 ft 3 in (1.91 m)
- Listed weight: 308 lb (140 kg)

Career information
- High school: Highlands Ranch (Highlands Ranch, Colorado)
- College: Texas
- NFL draft: 2007: 6th round, 183rd overall pick

Career history
- Houston Texans (2007–2012); Tennessee Titans (2013)*
- * Offseason or practice squad member only

Awards and highlights
- BCS national champion (2005); First-team All-Big 12 (2006); Second-team All-Big 12 (2005)

Career NFL statistics
- Games played: 25
- Games started: 14
- Stats at Pro Football Reference

Kasey Studdard (born July 1, 1984) is an American former professional football player who was an offensive guard in the National Football League (NFL). The son of former Denver Broncos tackle Dave Studdard, he was selected by the Houston Texans in the sixth round (183rd overall) of the 2007 NFL draft. He played college football for the Texas Longhorns.

== Early life ==
Studdard attended Highlands Ranch High School in Highlands Ranch, Colorado, where he won four varsity letters in football, basketball, and track and field. In football, he was a four-year starter as an offensive and defensive lineman. He was a two-time All-District selection, a two-time All-County selection, and a two-time first-team All-State selection.

As a sophomore, he was an All-League selection, and posted 75 tackles, four sacks, two fumble recoveries, and two blocked kicks. Studdard graduated from Highlands Ranch High School in 2002. Capping his high school career, he played in the 2002 U.S. Army All-American Bowl alongside future fellow Texas Longhorns Justin Blalock and Rodrique Wright.

== College career ==
Studdard redshirted his freshman year at the University of Texas at Austin and saw limited action. As a redshirt sophomore, Studdard was the starter for a Longhorn team that was second in the nation in rushing and went on to win its first Bowl Championship Series game, against Michigan at the 2005 Rose Bowl. The following year, Studdard helped anchor the offensive line, the same year that Texas led the nation in scoring offense. The Longhorns once again had the second-best rushing attack in the nation and went on to win the national championship against USC at the Rose Bowl. Studdard garnered second-team All Big 12 honors for his performance. In his final year at Texas, he started all 13 games and was voted team captain by his teammates. The team went 10-3, with a win against Iowa in the 2006 Alamo Bowl, the third straight bowl win for Texas. After the season ended, Studdard was named to the first-team All Big 12 by the league coaches and media.

== Professional career ==
=== Houston Texans ===
Studdard was selected by the Houston Texans in the sixth round of the 2007 NFL draft (183rd overall). He signed a four-year contract with the team on July 20, 2007. In 2009, Studdard replaced the injured Chester Pitts, and went on to start all 14 remaining games. He was re-signed by the team on July 28, 2012, but later released on August 27, 2012.

=== Tennessee Titans ===
Studdard signed a reserve/future contract with the Tennessee Titans on January 14, 2013. He was released on August 30, 2013.

== Personal life ==
Studdard is the son of Dave Studdard, who was an offensive tackle at Texas and played his entire NFL career with the Denver Broncos and the nephew of Les Studdard who played center for the Kansas City Chiefs and Houston Oilers. He graduated with a degree in youth and community studies. Studdard considers Katy, Texas, a suburb of Houston, his home town.
