= Glen Stough =

American football player (1921–1984)

No. 75
- Position: Tackle

Personal information
- Born: September 7, 1921; Irwin, Pennsylvania, U.S.
- Died: October 17, 1984 (aged 63); Greensburg, Pennsylvania, U.S.
- Listed height: 6 ft 5 in (1.96 m)
- Listed weight: 240 lb (109 kg)

Career information
- High school: Norwin (North Huntingdon, Pennsylvania)
- College: Duke
- NFL draft: 1945: 27th round, 277th overall pick

Career history
- Pittsburgh Steelers (1945)

Career NFL statistics
- Games played: 10
- Games started: 5
- Kickoff return yards: 6
- Fumbles recovered: 1
- Stats at Pro Football Reference

Glen Kintigh Stough (September 7, 1921 – October 17, 1984) was a tackle for the Pittsburgh Steelers of the National Football League (NFL). He was selected in the 27th round of the 1945 NFL draft, 227th overall. He was considered a giant on the Steelers, standing at six feet, five inches.

== College career ==
Stough attended Duke University, where he played football and basketball.
