= Dave Studdard =

American football player (born 1955)

No. 70
- Positions: Tackle, guard, tight end

Personal information
- Born: November 22, 1955 (age 70); San Antonio, Texas, U.S.
- Listed height: 6 ft 4 in (1.93 m)
- Listed weight: 260 lb (118 kg)

Career information
- College: Texas
- NFL draft: 1978: 9th round, 245th overall pick

Career history
- Baltimore Colts (1978)*; Denver Broncos (1979–1988)
- * Offseason or practice squad member only

Awards and highlights
- PFWA All-Rookie Team (1979); 1977 Co-National Champion - Rothman (FACT)

Career NFL statistics
- Receptions: 4
- Receiving yards: 10
- Receiving touchdowns: 2
- Stats at Pro Football Reference

David Studdard (born November 22, 1955) is an American former professional football player who was an offensive tackle for the Denver Broncos of the National Football League (NFL). He played in two Super Bowls for the Broncos. He also played for the national championship in college football with the Texas Longhorns, losing all three games.

== College career ==
Studdard played college football for the Texas Longhorns, where he was an All-Southwest Conference player. In 1977 he blocked for Heisman Trophy winner Earl Campbell, helped them win the Southwest Conference Championship, and came one win away from the National Championship. The next year, he helped them win the Sun Bowl.

== Professional career ==
Studdard had a 10-year career with the Denver Broncos, helping them to reach back-to-back Super Bowls where he had the unenviable task of stopping pro-bowlers Lawrence Taylor and Dexter Manley. He held future Hall-of-Famer Taylor to just four tackles in Super Bowl XXI, but injured his knee in the second quarter of Super Bowl XXII, an injury reporters called "devastating" and that allowed Manley to record 1.5 sacks after Studdard left.

Studdard was selected in the ninth round of the 1978 NFL draft by the Baltimore Colts but was waived in the offseason. After sitting out the 1978 season, he was signed by Denver where he quickly became a starter and made the all-rookie team. He mostly played tackle throughout his career, lining up on both the right and left side but occasionally played guard and, in some short yardage situations, as a tight end. As a tight end, he caught 4 passes for 2 touchdowns. He was regarded as an excellent pass blocker who helped the Broncos lead the league with the fewest sacks allowed.

Studdard's Super Bowl injury spelled the beginning of the end of his career. A few days after the game, he underwent surgery to repair the torn anterior cruciate ligament and also remove some damaged cartilage from his left knee. He started the next season on the injured reserve. That season he played in only 11 games and started just 4. Before the 1989 season, he was waived.

During the 1987 NFL player's strike, Studdard was one of the first players to cross the picket line to play.

== Later life and family ==
Studdard's son Kasey followed in his father's footsteps to play football at Texas and went on to play in the NFL for the Houston Texans.

After retiring, Studdard was involved in a players’ lawsuit over the treatment and care of concussion injuries.
