= Cris Dishman =

American football player and coach (born 1965)

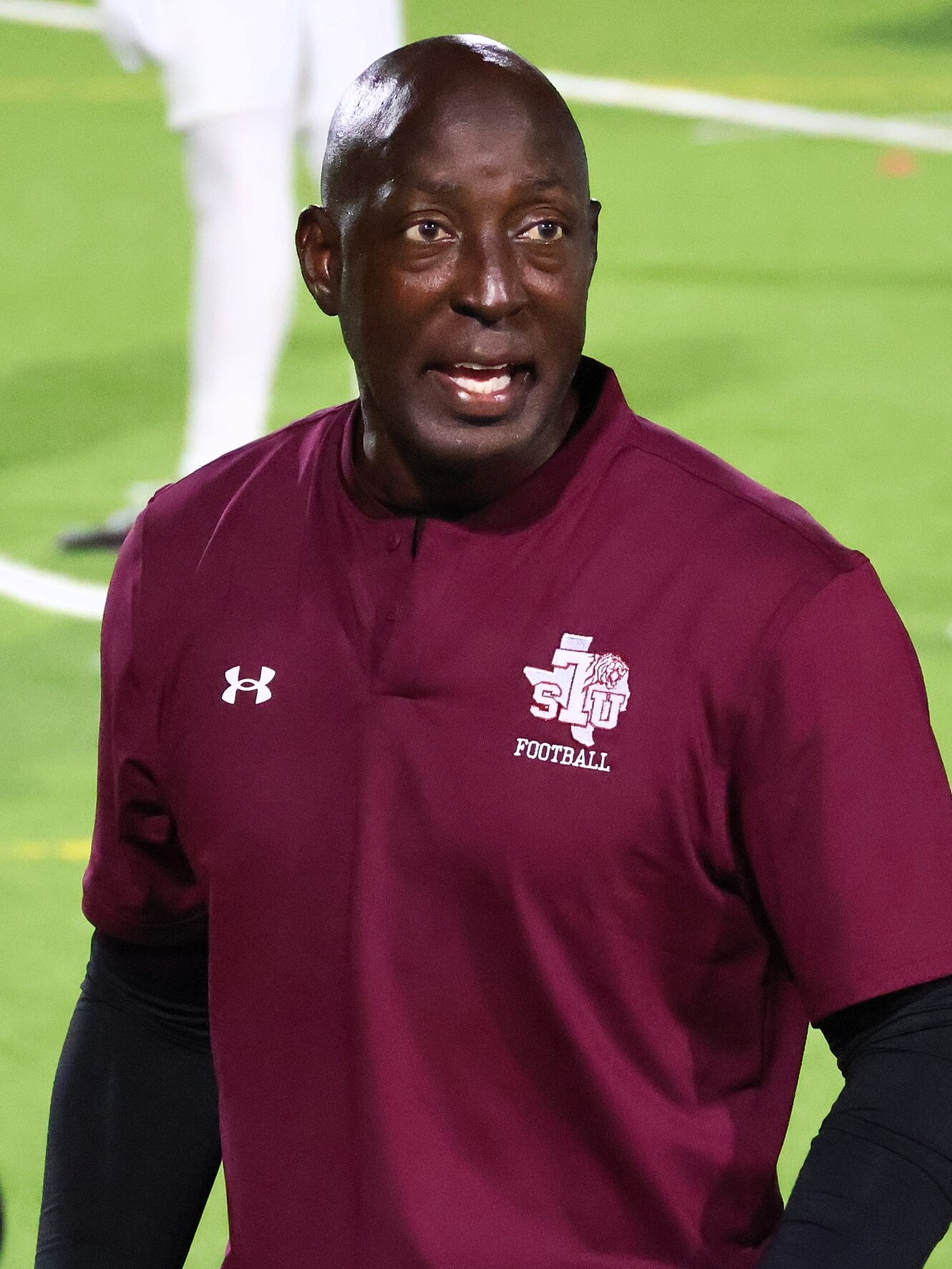
- Dishman with Texas Southern in 2026

Texas Southern Tigers
- Title: Head coach

Personal information
- Born: August 13, 1965 (age 61); Louisville, Kentucky, U.S.
- Listed height: 6 ft 0 in (1.83 m)
- Listed weight: 190 lb (86 kg)

Career information
- High school: DeSales (Louisville)
- College: Purdue
- NFL draft: 1988: 5th round, 125th overall pick

Career history

Playing
- Houston Oilers (1988–1996); Washington Redskins (1997–1998); Kansas City Chiefs (1999); Minnesota Vikings (2000)

Coaching
- Berlin Thunder (2004) Defensive backs coach; Menlo (2005) Defensive backs coach; Menlo (2006–2007) Defensive coordinator; San Diego Chargers (2008–2012) Assistant defensive backs coach; Baylor (2015–2016) Defensive backs coach; Arizona Cardinals (2017) Bill Walsh NFL diversity coaching fellowship; Montreal Alouettes (2018) Defensive backs coach; New York Guardians (2020) Defensive backs coach; IMG Academy (2021) Defensive backs coach; New Jersey Generals (2022) Defensive coordinator; Vegas Vipers (2023) Defensive coordinator; Texas Southern (2024–present) Head coach

Awards and highlights
- First-team All-Pro (1991); Second-team All-Pro (1997); 2× Pro Bowl (1991, 1997)

Career NFL statistics
- Tackles: 739
- Interceptions: 43
- Forced fumbles: 15
- Touchdowns: 6
- Stats at Pro Football Reference

Cris Edward Dishman (born August 13, 1965) is an American football coach and former player who is the 18th head football coach for Texas Southern University, a position he has held since 2024. He played professionally as a cornerback for 13 seasons in the National Football League (NFL).

Dishman played college football for the Purdue Boilermakers and was selected in the fifth round of the 1988 NFL draft. He played in the NFL for the Houston Oilers, Kansas City Chiefs, Minnesota Vikings, and Washington Redskins from 1988 to 2000.

== Early career ==
Dishman attended St. Francis DeSales High School where he was two time Kentucky All-State in 1981 and 1982. Dishman played college football at Purdue University, where he was named to the All-Big Ten team in 1987. He also ran track for the Boilermakers, running the 200-meter dash and 400-meter dash. He graduated in 1988 with a degree in criminal justice.

== Professional career ==
Pre-draft measurables
Height	Weight	Hand span	40-yard dash	10-yard split	20-yard split	20-yard shuttle	Vertical jump	Broad jump	Bench press
6 ft 0 in (1.83 m)	173 lb (78 kg)	8 3/4 in (0.22 m)	4.42 s	1.58 s	2.64 s	4.34 s	32.5 in (0.83 m)	9 ft 9 in (2.97 m)	7 reps
All values from NFL Combine

=== Houston Oilers ===
==== 1988 season ====
The Houston Oilers selected Dishman in the fifth round (125th overall) of the 1988 NFL draft. He was the 15th cornerback drafted in 1988. On July 16, 1988, the Oilers signed Dishman to a four–year rookie contract that would keep him under contract with the Oilers throughout the 1991 NFL season.

Throughout training camp, he competed against Richard Johnson to possibly be the No. 2 starting cornerback due to a contract holdout by Patrick Allen. Head coach Jerry Glanville named Dishman a backup and listed him as the third cornerback on the depth chart to begin the season, behind Steve Brown and Richard Johnson.

On September 4, 1988, Dishman made his professional regular season debut in the Houston Oilers’ season-opener at the Indianapolis Colts and recorded four solo tackles as they won in overtime 17–14. In Week 2, Dishman earned his first career start in place of Steve Brown who was inactive due to a hamstring injury and set a season-high with three pass deflections as the Oilers defeated the Los Angeles Raiders 38–35. He finished his rookie season in 1988 with 20 combined tackles (16 solo), five pass deflections, and a forced fumble in 15 games and two starts.

==== 1989 season ====
He returned to training camp slated as a backup cornerback and special teams player. Head coach Jerry Glanville named Dishman a backup and listed him as the third cornerback on the depth chart to start the season, behind starting duo Patrick Allen and Steve Brown.

On October 15, 1989, Dishman made two solo tackles, a pass deflection, and made his first career interception off a pass thrown by Mike Tomczak to wide receiver Glen Kozlowski during a 33–28 victory at the Chicago Bears. In Week 4, he recorded two combined tackles (one solo) and set a season-high with four pass deflections as the Oilers routed the Miami Dolphins 39–7. In Week 13, he made one solo tackle, two pass deflections, and sealed a 23–16 victory at the Pittsburgh Steelers by intercepting a last second Hail Mary thrown by Bubby Brister to end the game. On December 10, 1989, Dishman set a season-high with four pass deflections, made one pass break-up, and picked off Vinny Testaverde's pass attempt to wide receiver Willie Drewrey as the Oilers defeated the Tampa Bay Buccaneers 17–20. He finished the 1989 NFL season with a total of 26 combined tackles (20 solo), 20 pass deflections, four interceptions, one forced fumble, and made a fumble recovery in 16 games without any starts. Although Pro Football Reference doesn't provide game logs for the 1989 NFL season they recorded Dishman made 37 total tackles.

==== 1990 season ====
On January 7, 1990, Oilers’ head coach Jerry Glanville announced his resignation following a 9–7 record in 1989 and a first-round exit in the playoffs. On January 10, 1990, the Houston Oilers announced their decision to hire Jack Pardee to be their new head coach. Throughout training camp, Dishman was impressive in the absence of starters Steve Brown and Patrick Allen. Steve Brown would miss the majority of training camp due to an injury while Patrick Allen was in the midst of a holdout due to a contract dispute. Head coach Jack Pardee named Dishman and Richard Johnson the starting cornerbacks to begin the season.

On October 14, 1990, Dishman set a season-high with six combined tackles (five solo), made two pass deflections, and intercepted a pass Boomer Esiason threw to Kendal Smith as the Oilers routed the Cincinnati Bengals 17–48. In Week 13, he recorded three solo tackles, tied his season-high with three pass deflections, and intercepted a pass attempt Dave Krieg threw to wide receiver Jeff Chadwick during a 10–13 loss at the Seattle Seahawks. He started in all 16 games throughout the 1990 NFL season for the first time in his career and finished with 51 combined tackles (48 solo), 25 pass deflections, four interceptions, and a forced fumble. Pro Football Reference recorded 62 total tackles for Dishman in 1990.

==== 1991 season ====
The Houston Oilers selected cornerbacks Darryll Lewis in the second round (58th overall) and Steve Jackson in the third round (71st overall) of the 1991 NFL draft following the departures of Patrick Allen and Steve Brown. Defensive coordinator Jim Eddy retained Dishman and Richard Johnson as the starting cornerbacks to begin the season. Along with safeties Bubba McDowell and Michael Dumas, the Oilers secondary became known as “the Young Guns”.

On September 16, 1991, Dishman made four combined tackles (three solo), one pass deflection, and secured a 7–17 win against the Kansas City Chiefs by intercepting a pass Steve DeBerg threw to wide receiver Fred Jones in the fourth quarter. The following week, he set a season-high with ten combined tackles (six solo), made three pass deflections, and intercepted a pass Hugh Millen threw to wide receiver Irving Fryar during a 20–24 loss at the New England Patriots in Week 4. In Week 6, Dishman made eight combined tackles (six solo), two pass deflections, an interception, and returned a fumble by wide receiver Steve Sidwell for a 19–yard touchdown as the Oilers defeated the Denver Broncos 42–14. On October 20, 1991, Dishman made a pass deflection and secured a 17–13 win at the Miami Dolphins by recovering a fumble that linebacker Lamar Lathon caused by running back Sammie Smith with 3:21 remaining in the fourth quarter. In Week 11, he recorded five solo tackles and set a season-high with four pass deflections during a 26–23 overtime victory against the Dallas Cowboys. On November 17, 1991, he recorded two solo tackles, one pass deflection, and set a career-high with his sixth interception of the season on a pass by Bernie Kosar to running back Kevin Mack during a 24–28 victory against the Cleveland Browns. He was inactive as the Oilers lost 14–26 at the Pittsburgh Steelers due to a hamstring injury. He finished the 1991 NFL season with a total of 66 combined tackles (53 solo), 22 pass deflections, three forced fumbles, two fumble recoveries, and one touchdown in 15 games and 15 starts. He set a career-high with six interceptions throughout the season. His performance earned him a selection to the 1992 Pro Bowl, marking the first Pro Bowl selection of his career.

==== 1992 season ====
Dishman had fully completed his four–year rookie contract, but was unable to negotiate with any teams as the Oilers still held his player rights without the existence of free agency prior to 1993. He was unable to come to terms on a contract and subsequently was a training camp holdout along with seven other teammates, including Pro Bowlers Warren Moon, Mike Munchak, William Fuller, Sean Jones, and Curtis Duncan. On September 2, 1992, the Atlanta Falcons proposed a trade for Dishman and a high round draft selection to the Houston Oilers in return for wide receiver Andre Rison. Head coach Jack Pardee named Richard Johnson and Jerry Gray the starting cornerbacks to begin the season with Dishman continuing to holdout due to his contract throughout Week 1.

On September 10, 1992, the Houston Oilers re-signed Dishman to a two–year, $1.55 million contract that would keep him under contract with the team throughout the 1994 NFL season. On September 13, 1992, the Oilers waived starting cornerback Richard Johnson. Entering Week 2, head coach Jack Pardee named Dishman the No. 1 starting cornerback and paired him with Jerry Gray. In Week 6, he recorded two solo tackles and set a season-high with four pass deflections during a 26–10 win against the Cincinnati Bengals. On December 27, 1992, Dishman set a season-high with six combined tackles (four solo), and intercepted a pass Frank Reich threw to wide receiver James Lofton as the Oilers defeated the Buffalo Bills 3–27. He finished the season with a total of 39 combined tackles (32 solo), 19 pass deflections, three interceptions, and a forced fumble in 15 games and 15 starts.

==== 1993 season ====
On January 5, 1993, the Houston Oilers fired defensive coordinator Jim Eddy after finishing the 1992 NFL season with a 10–6 record and losing in the first round of the playoffs to the Buffalo Bills who overcame a 35–3 deficit known as ”The Comeback”. On January 30, 1993, the Houston Oilers hired former Philadelphia Eagles’ head coach Buddy Ryan to be their new defensive coordinator. Head coach Jack Pardee named Dishman as the No. 1 starting cornerback to begin the season and paired him with Darryll Lewis.

On September 12, 1993, Dishman recorded five solo tackles, made two pass deflections, and forced a fumble by tight end Mike Dyal, recovered, and returned it 58–yards for a touchdown during a 0–30 victory against the Kansas City Chiefs. In Week 4, No. 2 starting cornerback Darryll Lewis suffered a season-ending knee injury and was replaced by Steven Jackson for the rest of the season. On December 12, 1993, Dishman recorded three tackles, made three pass deflections, and led the Oilers to a 17–19 comeback victory against the Cleveland Browns by intercepting a pass Vinny Testaverde threw to wide receiver Mark Carrier later in the fourth quarter. In Week 16, he recorded three solo tackles and set a season-high with four pass deflections during a 26–17 victory at the Pittsburgh Steelers. In Week 18, Dishman set a season-high with nine solo tackles and made one pass deflection as the Oilers defeated the New York Jets 24–0 to win their 11th game in-a-row. He started in all 16 games throughout the season and finished with 74 combined tackles (64 solo), 29 pass deflections, six interceptions, four forced fumbles, two fumble recoveries, and one touchdown. He set career-highs in pass deflections and forced fumbles and tied his career-high of six interceptions.

The Houston Oilers finished the 1993 NFL season first in the AFC Central with a 12–4 record and earned a first-round bye in the playoffs. On January 16, 1994, Dishman made seven combined tackles (four solo) and two pass deflections as they lost 28–20 to the Kansas City Chiefs in the AFC Divisional Round.

==== 1994 season ====
On February 9, 1994, the Houston Oilers hired Jeff Fisher to be their new defensive coordinator following the departure of Buddy Ryan who accepted a head coaching position with the Arizona Cardinals. On March 10, 1994, the Oilers re-signed Dishman to a two–year, $3.90 million contract that included an initial signing bonus of $1 million. Head coach Jack Pardee retained Dishman as a starting cornerback to begin the season and paired him with the returning Darryll Lewis.

On November 14, 1994, the Houston Oilers fired head coach Jack Pardee after falling to a 1–9 record and appointed defensive coordinator Jeff Fisher to head coach. In Week 11, he set a season-high with eight solo tackles during a 31–34 loss at the Cincinnati Bengals. On December 4, 1994, Dishman recorded two combined tackles (one solo), set a season-high with three pass deflections, and returned an interception for a touchdown to mark the first pick-six of his career during a 30–12 loss to the Arizona Cardinals. During the first quarter, he intercepted a pass Jay Schroeder threw to wide receiver Ricky Proehl and returned it for a 36–yard touchdown. He started in all 16 games and finished with 66 combined tackles (53 solo), 22 pass deflections, four interceptions, one fumble recovery, and scored one touchdown.

==== 1995 season ====
The Oilers’ new defensive coordinator Steve Sidwell retained Dishman as the No. 1 starting cornerback to begin the season and paired him with Darryll Lewis. In Week 6, he set a season-high with seven combined tackles (five solo) during a 17–23 overtime loss at the Minnesota Vikings. On October 29, 1995, Dishman made one solo tackle, two pass deflections, and set a season-high with two interceptions off passes thrown by Trent Dilfer as the Oilers defeated the Tampa Bay Buccaneers 7–19. He finished the season with 58 combined tackles (48 solo), 11 pass deflections, three interceptions, two forced fumbles, and two fumble recoveries in 15 games and 15 starts.

==== 1996 season ====
Following the 1995 NFL season, Dishman became a restricted free agent and was also franchise tagged by the Oilers. The Oilers were able to match any contract offers made by any teams, but would have to pay him a salary equal to the top five highest paid cornerbacks. On February 10, 1996, the Houston Oilers re-signed Dishman to a fully-guaranteed one–year, $3.06 million contract.

Head coach Jeff Fisher named Dishman the No. 1 starting cornerback to begin the season alongside Darryll Lewis. On September 1, 1996, Dishman started in the Houston Oilers’ home-opener against the Kansas City Chiefs and recorded five combined tackles (three solo) and set a season-high with three pass deflections as they lost 20–19. In Week 7, he set a season-high with nine combined tackles (eight solo) and made one pass break-up during a 23–13 win at the Atlanta Falcons. On December 1, 1996, Dishman made four combined tackles (two solo), two pass deflections, and had his last interception with the Oilers on a pass Glenn Foley threw to Keyshawn Johnson during a 35–10 victory at the New York Jets. He started in all 16 games throughout the 1996 NFL season and finished with a total of 57 combined tackles (42 solo), 14 pass deflections, two fumble recoveries, and made one interception. Following an 8–8 record in 1996, Dishman became an unrestricted free agent and did not receive an offer from the Tennessee Oilers. During free agency, he met with the Washington Redskins and Chicago Bears.

=== Washington Redskins ===
==== 1997 season ====
On April 4, 1997, the Washington Redskins signed Dishman to a four–year, $9.60 million contract that included an initial signing bonus of $2.00 million. He was signed following the departure of Tom Carter to the Chicago Bears in free agency. He entered training camp slated as the No. 2 starting cornerback under defensive coordinator Mike Nolan. Head coach Norv Turner named Dishman and Darrell Green the starting cornerbacks to begin the season.

On August 31, 1997, Dishman started in the Washington Redskins’ season-opener at the Carolina Panthers and made two solo tackles, two pass deflections, and made his first interception as a part of the Redskins on a pass Steve Buerlein threw to tight end Wesley Walls as they won 24–10. On October 13, 1997, Dishman recorded seven solo tackles and set a season-high with four pass deflections as the Redskins defeated the Dallas Cowboys 21–16. The following week, he made four combined tackles (three solo), a pass deflection, and made the first sack of his career on former teammate Steve McNair for a three–yard loss alongside linebacker Marvcus Patton during a 14–28 loss at the Tennessee Oilers in Week 8. On December 7, 1997, Dishman made five combined tackles (four solo), two pass deflections, set a season-high with two interceptions, and returned one for a touchdown during a 38–28 win at the Arizona Cardinals. During the third quarter, Dishman intercepted a pass Jake Plummer threw to wide receiver Kevin Williams and returned it 21–yards for a touchdown. He finished the 1997 NFL season with 64 combined tackles (56 solo), 19 pass deflections, four interceptions, 1.5 sacks, two forced fumbles, a fumble recovery, and scored one touchdown in 16 games and 15 starts. His performance earned him a selection to the 1998 Pro Bowl, marking the second and final Pro Bowl selection of his career. His fellow cornerback Darrell Green was also selected.

==== 1998 season ====
Head coach Norv Turner retained Dishman and Darrell Green as the starting cornerbacks to begin the season. At age 33 and Darrell Green at age 38, they were the oldest cornerback tandem in the league. In Week 3, he recorded six combined tackles (five solo) and set a season-high with four pass deflections during a 14–24 loss at the Seattle Seahawks. On November 15, 1998, Dishman set a season-high with seven solo tackles, made two pass deflections, and set a season-high with two interceptions off passes by Bobby Hoying and Koy Detmer as the Redskins routed the Philadelphia Eagles 3–28. He started in all 16 games throughout the 1998 NFL season and recorded 68 combined tackles (60 solo), eight pass deflections, two interceptions, and had one forced fumble.

On April 17, 1999, the Washington Redskins released Dishman in order to save $2.70 million on their salary cap. The same day, the Redskins also selected cornerback Champ Bailey in the first round (7th overall) of the 1999 NFL draft.

=== Kansas City Chiefs ===
On May 13, 1999, the Kansas City Chiefs signed Dishman to a three–year, $4.70 million contract that included a signing bonus of $100,000. He entered training camp slated as the No. 2 starting cornerback following the departures of Dale Carter and Mark McMillian. Head coach Gunther Cunningham named Dishman and James Hasty the starting cornerbacks to begin the season.

In Week 9, he set a season-high with seven solo tackles during a 17–25 loss at the Indianapolis Colts. On November 28, 1999, Dishman recorded six combined tackles (four solo), set a season-high with three pass deflections, an interception, a fumble recovery, and set a career-high with two touchdowns to lead the Chiefs to a late 37–34 fourth quarter comeback victory at the Oakland Raiders. During the third quarter, Dishman had a pick-six after picking off a pass Rich Gannon threw to running back Tyrone Wheatley and returned it 47–yards for a touchdown. During the fourth quarter, as the Chiefs were losing 27–34, Dishman recovered a fumble by tight end Derrick Walker that was forced by free safety Jerome Woods and returned it for a 40–yard touchdown to tie the game 34–34. In Week 17, he recorded six combined tackles (five solo), tied his season-high with three pass deflections, and intercepted a Rich Gannon's pass to Tim Brown during a 41–38 overtime loss against the Oakland Raiders. He started in all 16 games throughout the 1999 NFL season for the Chiefs and recorded 72 combined tackles (60 solo), 21 pass deflections, five interceptions, three forced fumbles, one fumble recovery, and set a career-high with two touchdowns.

=== Minnesota Vikings ===
On August 28, 2000, the Minnesota Vikings signed Dishman to a three–year, $5.25 million contract that included an initial signing bonus of $250,000. He entered training camp slated as the No. 1 starting cornerback following the departures of Ramos McDonald and Jimmy Hitchcock. Head coach Dennis Green named Dishman and Robert Tate the starting cornerbacks to begin the season.

On September 17, 2000, Dishman made five solo tackles, two pass deflections, and made the last interception of his career on a pass Drew Bledsoe threw to wide receiver Terry Glenn during a 21–13 victory at the New England Patriots. In Week 8, he set a season-high with seven solo tackles as the Vikings defeated the Buffalo Bills 31–27. On November 6, 2000, Dishman recorded seven combined tackles (five solo) and made two pass deflections before he infamously botched an interception during a 20–26 overtime loss at the Green Bay Packers. During overtime, Brett Favre would throw a pass to wide receiver Antonio Freeman who slipped on the wet grass at Lambeau Field. Dishman dropped an interception onto the back shoulder of Freeman, who turned over to make the catch. Antonio Freeman would immediately get up to his feet and score the 43–yard game-winning touchdown. The following week, Dishman would be inactive due to a separated shoulder, losing his starting role to Kenny Wright in the process. On November 26, 2000, the Minnesota Vikings officially released Dishman. He finished the season with 52 combined tackles (45 solo), nine pass deflections, and one interception in 11 games and nine starts.

== After football ==
After retiring, Dishman became a football coach. He started off by taking part in the NFL's Minority Coaching Fellowship program. During the 2006 Miami Dolphins season, Dishman spent training camp as a coach for the Dolphins, alongside Eric Green and Cornell Brown. Shortly afterward, Dishman became the defensive backs coach for Menlo College in 2006. He spent the summer of 2007 again as part of the minority coaching fellowship, this time as a coach for the Oakland Raiders.

On January 21, 2009, Dishman was hired by the San Diego Chargers as an assistant defensive backs coach, helping out newly acquired secondary coach Steven Wilks.

On January 14, 2015, Dishman joined the Baylor University football staff coaching Safeties.

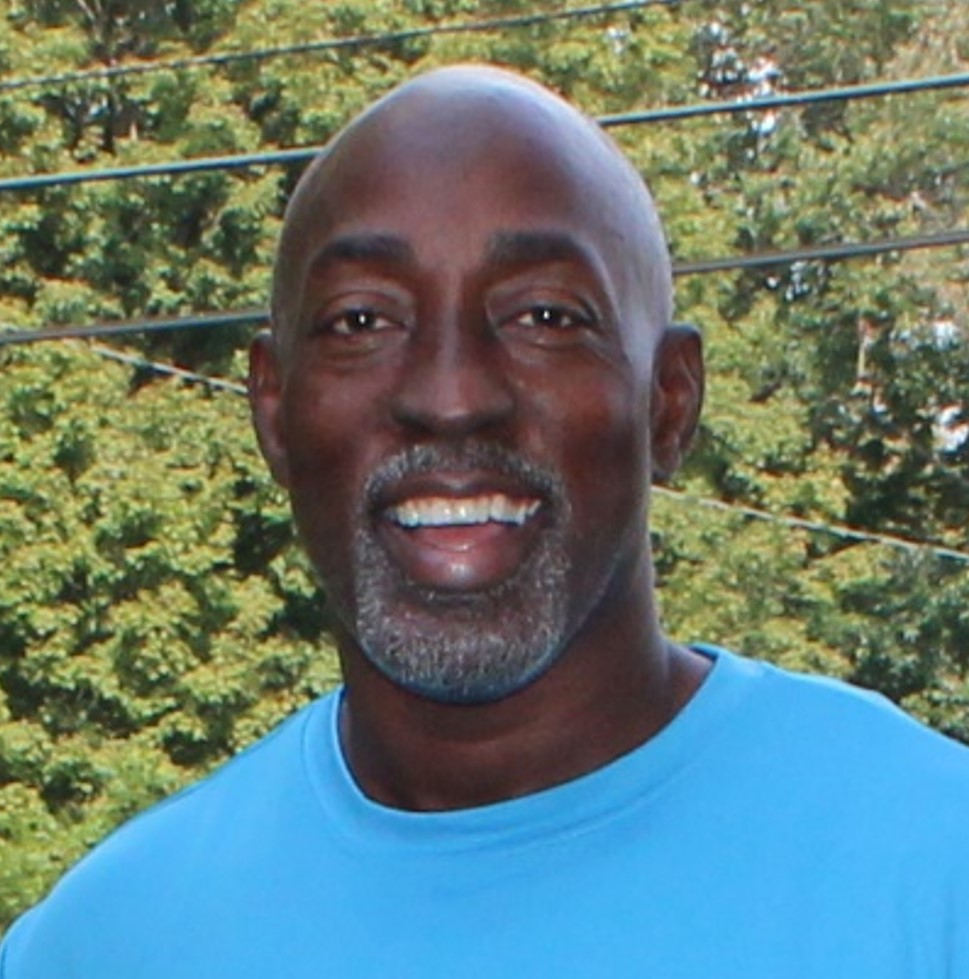
Dishman in 2017

On May 20, 2018, Dishman joined the Montreal Alouettes as part of the Canadian Football League CFL to coach the defensive backs.

On June 1, 2019, Dishman was named the defensive backs coach for the New York Guardians of the XFL.

On July 1, 2020, Dishman was named the defensive backs coach for IMG Academy in Bradenton, Florida.

In March 2022, Dishman was named the defensive coordinator and defensive backs coach for the New Jersey Generals of the USFL.

Dishman was officially hired by the Vegas Vipers on September 13, 2022 In summer 2024, Dishman was named head coach at Texas Southern University.

== NFL career statistics ==
=== Regular season ===
Year	Team	Games		Tackles				Interceptions					Fumbles			
Year	Team	GP	GS	Comb	Solo	Ast	Sck	Int	Yds	Avg	Lng	TD	FF	FR	Yds	TD
1988	HOU	15	2	21	—	—	0.0	0	0	0.0	0	0	1	1	0	0
1989	HOU	16	0	37	—	—	0.0	4	31	7.8	31	0	1	1	0	0
1990	HOU	16	16	62	—	—	0.0	4	50	12.5	42	0	1	0	0	0
1991	HOU	15	15	66	—	—	0.0	6	61	10.2	43	0	2	3	19	1
1992	HOU	15	15	40	—	—	0.0	3	34	11.3	17	0	1	0	0	0
1993	HOU	16	16	78	—	—	0.0	6	74	12.3	30	0	4	2	69	1
1994	HOU	16	16	66	53	13	0.0	4	74	18.5	38	1	0	1	29	0
1995	HOU	15	15	58	48	10	0.0	3	17	5.7	17	0	1	2	15	0
1996	HOU	16	16	57	42	15	0.0	1	7	7.0	7	0	0	2	0	0
1997	WAS	16	15	64	56	8	1.5	4	47	10.8	29	1	2	1	0	0
1998	WAS	16	16	66	60	6	0.0	2	60	30.0	49	0	1	0	0	0
1999	KC	16	16	72	60	12	0.0	5	95	19.0	47	1	1	3	40	1
2000	MIN	11	9	52	45	7	0.0	1	0	0.0	0	0	0	0	0	0
Career		199	167	739	364	71	1.5	43	550	12.8	49	3	15	16	172	3

== Head coaching record ==
Year	Team	Overall	Conference	Standing	Bowl/playoffs
Texas Southern Tigers (Southwestern Athletic Conference) (2024–present)
2024	Texas Southern	5–6	4–4	3rd (West)	
2025	Texas Southern	6–5	5–3	2nd (West)	
2026	Texas Southern	1–3	0–2		
Texas Southern:		12–14	9–9		
Total:		12–14			
