= 1993 Houston Oilers season =

34th season in franchise history, filled with turmoil

- Owner: Bud Adams
- General manager: Mike Holovak
- Head coach: Jack Pardee
- Offensive coordinator: Kevin Gilbride
- Defensive coordinator: Buddy Ryan
- Home stadium: Houston Astrodome

Results
- Record: 12–4
- Division place: 1st AFC Central
- Playoffs: Lost Divisional Playoffs (vs. Chiefs) 20–28
- Pro Bowlers: QB Warren Moon; WR Haywood Jeffires; WR Webster Slaughter; G Mike Munchak; C Bruce Matthews; DE Sean Jones; DT Ray Childress; P Greg Montgomery

Uniform
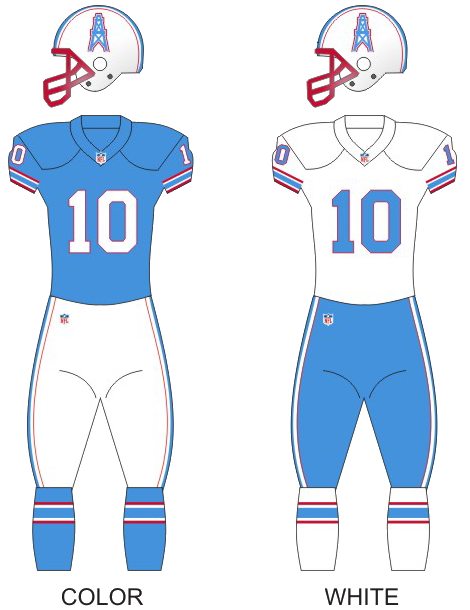

The 1993 Houston Oilers season was the team's 34th, and their 24th in the National Football League (NFL).

The 1993 Oilers season is widely regarded as one of the most notorious and turbulent seasons in NFL history, both on and off the field. Before the season began, owner Bud Adams told the team that unless the Oilers made the Super Bowl, they can expect to see a massive overhaul next year due to the impending salary cap. Despite their poor start (four losses in their first five games), the Oilers went on a remarkable 11–0 run to finish the 1993 season, ending up tied for the best record in the NFL, and the best record in franchise history, at 12–4. Houston earned the #2 seed in the playoffs, and a first-round bye that meant they would host their first ever Divisional Round playoff game. The 11-game winning streak was the longest in the NFL since 1972.

Statistics site Football Outsiders calculates that the Oilers were the hottest team in the NFL heading into the playoffs at the end of the 1993 season.

Despite the winning streak, first round bye and playing in front of a home crowd, the Oilers were upset by Joe Montana and the Kansas City Chiefs at the Astrodome during the Divisional Round of the playoffs.

The 2006 edition of Pro Football Prospectus, listed the 1993 Oilers as one of their "Heartbreak Seasons", in which teams "dominated the entire regular season only to falter in the playoffs, unable to close the deal." Said Pro Football Prospectus, "Early in 1993, the Oilers seemed unable to put 'The Comeback' behind them, dropping four of their first five games. But Houston righted the ship and ran the table, winning its final 11 contests. ... The Oilers allowed 20 points only once during the streak, and in one game held the top offense of the 49ers offense to 7 points.

"In their first playoff game", Pro Football Prospectus continued, "they faced Joe Montana's Kansas City Chiefs, a team Houston had beaten 30–0 during the regular season. The Oilers jumped out to an early 10–0 lead, but stalled; leading 13–7 in the fourth quarter, they collapsed, losing 28–20. The team that had played eleven straight games while holding opponents to 20 points or less gave up 21 in the fourth quarter of a playoff game." This would be the last season Warren Moon played for the Oilers, as he was traded to Minnesota in the 1994 offseason. This would be their last winning season and playoff appearance under the Houston Oilers name, or as the Oilers. Their next winning season and playoff appearance would be in their first year as the Tennessee Titans in 1999. The 1993 season was later covered in the "Houston '93" episode of the NFL Films documentary series A Football Life.

== Season Review ==
=== "Babygate" ===
One bizarre sidelight to the season for Houston came just before the October 17 game vs. the New England Patriots. The day before, Oilers offensive tackle David Williams' wife Debi went into labor that Saturday but the baby was not born yet and Williams was unable to catch a flight, causing him to miss the game. Williams was fined $111,111 by the Oilers for missing the game and criticized by owner Bud Adams for "misplaced priorities", a move that led to intense criticism of the Oilers from fans, players such as defensive end Sean Jones, and news media and talk shows across the United States.

=== Buddy Ryan-Kevin Gilbride Conflict ===
New defensive coordinator Buddy Ryan and offensive coordinator Kevin Gilbride did not get along at all; Ryan's autonomy with the defense as promised by team owner Bud Adams (granted in the aftermath of Houston's historic collapse in the previous season playoff loss in Buffalo) and loyalty amongst his players and coaches led to clashes with Gilbride, who was angered by cheap shots the defense regularly inflicted on the offense during practices. Ryan had been criticizing Gilbride's "run and shoot" offense, referring to it as the "chuck and duck." Ryan's own rage grew when two of his players were hurt after going back into games when the offense could have simply just run the ball and killed the clock, but were not able to because of problems the Oilers had using conventional running plays.

At the end of the first half in the final game of the season, a national broadcast against the New York Jets, Gilbride called a pass play, and when Cody Carlson was sacked and fumbled, Ryan started yelling at Gilbride, who started walking towards Ryan, yelling back. When they were in arms length, Ryan threw a glancing punch at Gilbride, who was ready to hit Ryan in return but slightly lost his balance and was then blocked from doing so as two players quickly separated them. Gilbride wanted to physically pay Buddy back for the cheap shot but several players on both offense and defense begged him to not do so because they were winning a key game. Gilbride reluctantly agreed, and ignored Buddy for the rest of the season and reportedly never spoke to him again. Buddy Ryan would become the Arizona Cardinals head coach after the season.

=== Gay teammates ===
In 2013, former teammates on the 1993 team said that at least two key players on their roster were generally known by the team to be gay, and were accepted by the team. It confirmed a rumor that had been hinted since that season, but had never been confirmed; had the rumors been proven in 1993, during an era of heightened stigma in the United States towards the HIV/AIDS epidemic compared to today and a mere two years after NBA superstar Magic Johnson's high-profile retirement upon being diagnosed with the disease, it would have almost certainly been the most controversial story of an already turbulent season for the Oilers. Teammate Bubba McDowell said showering with the gay teammates was "no big deal." Lamar Lathon added that he had "never seen tougher guys than those guys."

=== Jeff Alm's suicide ===
Late in the season, the Oilers suffered the loss of reserve defensive tackle Jeff Alm, who had played two games earlier in the season and was due back soon after rehabilitating a broken leg. At approximately 2:30 am on December 14, 1993, Alm and his best friend, Sean P. Lynch, were in an accident that consisted of Alm losing control of his Cadillac Eldorado near the 610 and Highway 59 interchange, ejecting Lynch out through the windshield of the car where he fell several stories to the asphalt below, killing him instantly. Both Alm and Lynch were intoxicated at the time of the crash after spending a night on the town, and the latter was not wearing a seatbelt while in the vehicle. After seeing his friend was dead, Alm called 9-1-1 and then committed suicide with a shotgun he kept in the trunk of his car. In memory of Alm, his number was worn as a decal on his teammates' helmets and his locker remained untouched for the rest of the season.

== Offseason ==
=== NFL draft ===
1993 Houston Oilers draft
Round	Pick	Player	Position	College	Notes
1	13	Brad Hopkins *	Offensive tackle	Illinois	
2	47	Micheal Barrow	Linebacker	Miami (FL)	
4	102	Travis Hannah	Wide receiver	USC	
5	131	John Henry Mills *	Linebacker	Wake Forest	
6	158	Chuck Bradley	Offensive tackle	Kentucky	
7	187	Patrick Robinson	Wide receiver	Tennessee State	
8	214	Blaine Bishop *	Safety	Ball State	
Made roster * Made at least one Pro Bowl during career

=== Undrafted free agents ===
1993 undrafted free agents of note
Player	Position	College
Lee Williamson	Quarterback	Presbyterian

== Personnel ==
=== Staff ===
1993 Houston Oilers staff
Front office: Owner/Chairman of the Board/President – Bud Adams; Executive Vice President/General Manager – Mike Holovak; Assistant General Manager – Floyd Reese; Head coaches: Head Coach – Jack Pardee; Offensive coaches: Offensive Coordinator – Kevin Gilbride; Running Backs – Frank Novak; Receivers – Charlie Baggett; Offensive Line – Bob Young	Defensive coaches: Defensive Coordinator – Buddy Ryan; Defensive Line – Jim Stanley; Linebackers – Ronnie Jones; Defensive Backs – Tom Bettis; Quality Control – Frank Bush; Special teams coaches: Special Teams – Gregg Williams; Strength and conditioning: Strength and Rehabilitation – Steve Watterson

=== Roster ===
1993 Houston Oilers roster
Quarterbacks (QB): 14 Cody Carlson; 1 Warren Moon; 7 Bucky Richardson; Running backs (RB): 33 Gary Brown; 47 Le'Shai Maston; 32 Spencer Tillman; 44 Lorenzo White; Wide receivers (WR): 89 Reggie Brown; 87 Pat Coleman; 85 Willie Drewrey; 80 Curtis Duncan; 81 Ernest Givins; 82 Travis Hannah; 84 Haywood Jeffires; 82 Tony Jones; 86 Damon Mays; 88 Gary Wellman; Tight ends (TE): 48 John Henry Mills	Offensive linemen (OL): 66 Doug Dawson G; 77 Kevin Donnalley T; 72 Brad Hopkins T; 74 Bruce Matthews C; 63 Mike Munchak G; 64 Erik Norgard C; 70 Stan Thomas T; 73 David Williams T; Defensive linemen (DL): 79 Ray Childress DT; 95 William Fuller DE; 96 Sean Jones DE; 78 Keith McCants DE; 94 Glenn Montgomery DT; 68 Tim Roberts DT; 71 Mike Teeter DE; 97 Lee Williams DE	Linebackers (LB): 56 Micheal Barrow MLB; 59 Joe Bowden OLB; 56 Scott Kozak OLB; 57 Lamar Lathon OLB; 58 Wilber Marshall OLB; 50 Eddie Robinson OLB; 54 Al Smith MLB; Defensive backs (DB): 36 Melvin Aldridge FS; 23 Blaine Bishop SS; 22 Tony Brown CB; 28 Cris Dishman CB; 27 Terry Hoage FS; 24 Steve Jackson CB; 25 Bubba McDowell SS; 26 Bo Orlando FS; Special teams (ST): 3 Al Del Greco K; 9 Greg Montgomery P	Practice squad: 20 Manny Martin CB; 60 Jeff Neal G; 75 LeRoy Truitt T; 10 Lee Williamson QB; Reserve: 38 Mike Dumas S (IR); 55 John Flannery C (IR); 29 Darryll Lewis CB (IR); 31 Marcus Robertson S (IR); 89 Webster Slaughter WR (IR); 51 active, 5 inactive, 4 practice squad Rookies in italics

== Regular season ==
=== Schedule ===
Week	Date	Opponent	Result	Record	Venue	Attendance
1	September 5	at New Orleans Saints	**L** 21–33	0–1	Louisiana Superdome	69,029
2	September 12	Kansas City Chiefs	**W** 30–0	1–1	Astrodome	59,780
3	September 19	at San Diego Chargers	**L** 17–18	1–2	Jack Murphy Stadium	58,519
4	September 26	Los Angeles Rams	**L** 13–28	1–3	Astrodome	53,072
5	Bye					
6	October 11	at Buffalo Bills	**L** 7–35	1–4	Rich Stadium	79,613
7	October 17	at New England Patriots	**W** 28–14	2–4	Foxboro Stadium	51,037
8	October 24	**Cincinnati Bengals**	**W** 28–12	3–4	Astrodome	50,039
9	Bye					
10	November 7	Seattle Seahawks	**W** 24–14	4–4	Astrodome	50,447
11	November 14	at **Cincinnati Bengals**	**W** 38–3	5–4	Riverfront Stadium	42,347
12	November 21	at **Cleveland Browns**	**W** 27–20	6–4	Cleveland Municipal Stadium	71,668
13	November 28	**Pittsburgh Steelers**	**W** 23–3	7–4	Astrodome	61,238
14	December 5	Atlanta Falcons	**W** 33–17	8–4	Astrodome	58,186
15	December 12	**Cleveland Browns**	**W** 19–17	9–4	Astrodome	58,720
16	December 19	at **Pittsburgh Steelers**	**W** 26–17	10–4	Three Rivers Stadium	57,592
17	December 25	at San Francisco 49ers	**W** 10–7	11–4	Candlestick Park	61,744
18	January 2, 1994	New York Jets	**W** 24–0	12–4	Astrodome	61,040
Note: Intra-division opponents are in **bold** text.

=== Game summaries ===
==== Week 1: at New Orleans Saints ====
Week 1: Houston Oilers at New Orleans Saints – Game summary

Quarter	1	2	3	4	Total
Oilers	7	0	0	14	**21**
**Saints**	3	10	6	14	**33**

at Louisiana Superdome, New Orleans, Louisiana

- Date: September 5
- Game time: 7:00 p.m. CDT
- Game weather: None (indoor stadium)
- Game attendance: 69,029
- TV announcers (TNT): Gary Bender and Pat Haden
- Box score

Game information

**First quarter**

- HOU – Haywood Jeffires 6-yard pass from Warren Moon (Al Del Greco kick). Oilers 7–0.
- NO – Morten Andersen 28-yard field goal. Oilers 7–3.

**Second quarter**

- NO – Dalton Hilliard 2-yard run (Morten Andersen kick). Saints 10–7.
- NO – Morten Andersen 37-yard field goal. Saints 13–7.

**Third quarter**

- NO – Morten Andersen 18-yard field goal. Saints 16–7.
- NO – Morten Andersen 47-yard field goal. Saints 19–7.

**Fourth quarter**

- NO – Frank Warren 47-yard fumble return (Morten Andersen kick). Saints 26–7.
- NO – Derek Brown 2-yard run (Morten Andersen kick). Saints 33–7.
- HOU – Cody Carlson 1-yard run (Al Del Greco kick). Saints 33–14.
- HOU – Marcus Robertson 80-yard fumble return (Al Del Greco kick). Saints 33–21.

**Top passers**

- HOU – Warren Moon – 21/32, 241 yards, TD, INT
- NO – Wade Wilson – 16/25, 206 yards

**Top rushers**

- HOU – Lorenzo White – 15 rushes, 59 yards
- NO – Lorenzo Neal – 13 rushes, 89 yards

**Top receivers**

- HOU – Curtis Duncan – 4 receptions, 90 yards
- NO – Eric Martin – 7 receptions, 111 yards

Houston's run and shoot offense and 46 defense were inconsistent throughout the game. The Oilers scored first to take a 7–0 lead in the first, but the Saints would respond by scoring 33 unanswered points to go up 33–7 in the fourth. Starting quarterback Warren Moon would eventually be benched in favor of Cody Carlson, with the latter breaking Houston's scoring drought with a 1-yard touchdown run in the fourth quarter.

==== Week 2: vs. Kansas City Chiefs ====
Week 2: Kansas City Chiefs at Houston Oilers – Game summary

Quarter	1	2	3	4	Total
Chiefs	0	0	0	0	**0**
**Oilers**	0	7	6	17	**30**

at Astrodome, Houston, Texas

- Date: September 12
- Game time: 12:00 p.m. CDT
- Game weather: None (indoor stadium)
- Game attendance: 59,780
- Referee: Howard Roe
- TV announcers (NBC): Marv Albert and Paul Maguire
- Box score

Game information

**First quarter**

- No scoring plays

**Second quarter**

- HOU – Curtis Duncan 2-yard pass from Warren Moon (Al Del Greco kick). Oilers 7–0.

**Third quarter**

- HOU – Al Del Greco 25-yard field goal. Oilers 10–0.
- HOU – Al Del Greco 22-yard field goal. Oilers 13–0.

**Fourth quarter**

- HOU – Al Del Greco 50-yard field goal. Oilers 16–0.
- HOU – Cris Dishman 58-yard fumble return (Al Del Greco kick). Oilers 23–0.
- HOU – Lorenzo White 1-yard run (Al Del Greco kick). Oilers 30–0.

**Top passers**

- KC – Dave Krieg – 15/27, 175 yards, 2 INT
- HOU – Warren Moon – 22/35, 204 yards, TD, INT

**Top rushers**

- KC – Marcus Allen – 6 receptions, 17 yards
- HOU – Lorenzo White – 24 rushes, 48 yards, TD

**Top receivers**

- KC – Willie Davis – 3 receptions, 67 yards
- HOU – Webster Slaughter – 6 receptions, 74 yards

The Oilers blanked the Chiefs 30–0, who were without star quarterback Joe Montana. The Houston defense forced five turnovers, picking off Kansas City quarterback Dave Krieg twice, and cornerback Cris Dishman returning a fumble 58 yards for a touchdown.

==== Week 3: at San Diego Chargers ====
Week 3: Houston Oilers at San Diego Chargers – Game summary

Quarter	1	2	3	4	Total
Oilers	0	14	0	3	**17**
**Chargers**	3	6	3	6	**18**

at Jack Murphy Stadium, San Diego, California

- Date: September 19
- Game time: 3:00 p.m. CDT/1:00 p.m. PDT
- Game weather: 66 °F (19 °C)
- Game attendance: 58,519
- Referee: Ed Hochuli
- TV announcers (NBC): Charlie Jones and Todd Christensen
- Box score

Game information

**First quarter**

- SD – John Carney 34-yard field goal. Chargers 3–0.

**Second quarter**

- SD – John Carney 34-yard field goal. Chargers 6–0.
- SD – John Carney 27-yard field goal. Chargers 9–0.
- HOU – Webster Slaughter 2-yard pass from Warren Moon (Al Del Greco kick). Chargers 9–7.
- HOU – Darryll Lewis 47-yard interception return (Al Del Greco kick). Oilers 14–9.

**Third quarter**

- SD – John Carney 27-yard field goal. Oilers 14–12.

**Fourth quarter**

- SD – John Carney 36-yard field goal. Chargers 15–14.
- HOU – Al Del Greco 27-yard field goal. Oilers 17–15.
- SD – John Carney 27-yard field goal. Chargers 18–17.

**Top passers**

- HOU – Warren Moon – 19/37, 199 yards, TD, 4 INT
- SD – John Friesz – 8/15, 110 yards

**Top rushers**

- HOU – Lorenzo White – 13 rushes, 47 yards
- SD – Marion Butts – 16 rushes, 66 yards

**Top receivers**

- HOU – Webster Slaughter – 7 receptions, 60 yards, TD
- SD – Nate Lewis – 2 receptions, 57 yards

Both offenses struggled in the game with both teams benching their respective starting quarterbacks. Houston quarterback Warren Moon threw four interceptions before being benched for backup quarterback Cody Carlson. Stan Humphries started at quarterback for San Diego, but was benched after completing just 27% of his passes for 73 yards and an interception in favor of John Friesz. The Chargers failed to score a single touchdown, but kicker John Carney made six field goals to give San Diego the one-point victory.

==== Week 4: vs. Los Angeles Rams ====
Week 4: Los Angeles Rams at Houston Oilers – Game summary

Quarter	1	2	3	4	Total
**Rams**	7	7	7	7	**28**
Oilers	0	3	10	0	**13**

at Astrodome, Houston, Texas

- Date: September 26
- Game time: 12:00 p.m. CDT
- Game weather: None (played indoors)
- Game attendance: 53,072
- TV: CBS
- Box score

Game information

**First quarter**

- RAM – Flipper Anderson 4-yard pass from Jim Everett (Tony Zendejas kick). Rams 7–0.

**Second quarter**

- RAM – Jerome Bettis 1-yard run (Tony Zendejas kick). Rams 14–0.
- HOU – Al Del Greco 52-yard field goal. Rams 14–3.

**Third quarter**

- HOU – Al Del Greco 25-yard field goal. Rams 14–6.
- HOU – Ernest Givins 80-yard pass from Warren Moon (Al Del Greco kick). Rams 14–13.
- RAM – Travis McNeal 22-yard pass from Jim Everett (Tony Zendejas kick). Rams 21–13.

**Fourth quarter**

- RAM – Henry Ellard 48-yard pass from Jim Everett (Tony Zendejas kick). Rams 28–13.

**Top passers**

- RAM – Jim Everett – 19/28, 316 yards, 3 TD
- HOU – Warren Moon – 19/42, 310 yards, TD, 2 INT

**Top rushers**

- RAM – Jerome Bettis – 11 rushes, 25 yards, TD
- HOU – Lorenzo White – 19 rushes, 74 yards

**Top receivers**

- RAM – Henry Ellard – 6 receptions, 132 yards, TD
- HOU – Ernest Givins – 3 receptions, 107 yards, TD

The Oilers' offensive woes continued against the Rams. Warren Moon threw for 310 yards and a touchdown, but also threw two interceptions and completed just 45% of his passes on 42 attempts.

==== Week 6: at Buffalo Bills ====
Week 6: Houston Oilers at Buffalo Bills – Game summary

Quarter	1	2	3	4	Total
Oilers	7	0	0	0	**7**
**Bills**	7	21	0	7	**35**

at Rich Stadium, Orchard Park, New York

- Date: October 11
- Game time: 7:00 p.m. CDT/9:00 p.m. EDT
- Game weather: 41 °F (5 °C)
- Game attendance: 79,613
- Referee: Tom White
- TV announcers (ABC): Frank Gifford, Al Michaels, and Dan Dierdorf
- Box score

Game information

**First quarter**

- BUF – Don Beebe 34-yard pass from Jim Kelly (Steve Christie kick). Bills 7–0.
- HOU – Leonard Harris 17-yard pass from Warren Moon (Al Del Greco kick). Tied 7–7.

**Second quarter**

- BUF – Andre Reed 24-yard pass from Jim Kelly (Steve Christie kick). Bills 14–7.
- BUF – Andre Reed 39-yard pass from Jim Kelly (Steve Christie kick). Bills 21–7.
- BUF – Thurman Thomas 7-yard run (Steve Christie kick). Bills 28–7.

**Third quarter**

- No scoring plays

**Fourth quarter**

- BUF – Kenneth Davis 3-yard run (Steve Christie kick). Bills 35–7.

**Top passers**

- HOU – Warren Moon – 16/25, 177 yards, TD, 3 INT
- BUF – Jim Kelly – 15/25, 247 yards, 3 TD

**Top rushers**

- HOU – Lorenzo White – 12 rushes, 38 yards
- BUF – Thurman Thomas – 24 rushes, 92 yards, TD

**Top receivers**

- HOU – Lorenzo White – 8 receptions, 65 yards
- BUF – Andre Reed – 4 receptions, 85 yards, 2 TD

Coming out of their first bye, the Oilers' offense continued to struggle with Warren Moon throwing three interceptions before being benched for backup Cody Carlson for the third time of the season. With the loss, the Oilers dropped to 1–4. This would be Houston's last loss of the regular season as the team would then go on an eleven game win streak.

==== Week 7: at New England Patriots ====
Week 7: Houston Oilers at New England Patriots – Game summary

Quarter	1	2	3	4	Total
**Oilers**	0	14	7	7	**28**
Patriots	0	0	7	7	**14**

at Foxboro Stadium, Foxborough, Massachusetts

- Date: October 17
- Game time: 12:00 p.m. CDT/1:00 p.m. EDT
- Game weather: 53 °F (12 °C)
- Game attendance: 51,037
- Box score

Game information

**First quarter**

- No scoring plays

**Second quarter**

- HOU – Cody Carlson 10-yard run (Al Del Greco kick). Oilers 7–0.
- HOU – Webster Slaughter 7-yard pass from Warren Moon (Al Del Greco kick). Oilers 14–0.

**Third quarter**

- NE – Kevin Turner 7-yard pass from Scott Secules (Scott Sisson kick). Oilers 14–7.
- HOU – Webster Slaughter 2-yard pass from Warren Moon (Al Del Greco kick). Oilers 21–7.

**Fourth quarter**

- HOU – Steve Jackson 22-yard interception return (Al Del Greco kick). Oilers 28–7.
- NE – Leonard Russell 1-yard run (Scott Sisson kick). Oilers 28–14.

**Top passers**

- HOU – Warren Moon – 16/21, 102 yards, 2 TD
- NE – Scott Secules – 23/40, 280 yards, TD, 3 INT

**Top rushers**

- HOU – Lorenzo White – 20 rushes, 94 yards
- NE – Leonard Russell – 15 rushes, 42 yards, TD

**Top receivers**

- HOU – Webster Slaughter – 9 receptions, 57 yards, 2 TD
- NE – Ben Coates – 3 receptions, 68 yards

After weeks of poor offensive performances, the Oilers would score 21 points on offense. Quarterback Warren Moon, who had been benched three times and was listed second on the depth chart entering the game, came off the bench, throwing for two touchdowns and no interceptions. With the win, Houston improved to 2–4. This would be their last road win against New England until 2019.

==== Week 8: vs. Cincinnati Bengals ====
Week 8: Cincinnati Bengals at Houston Oilers – Game summary

Quarter	1	2	3	4	Total
Bengals	0	9	3	0	**12**
**Oilers**	7	0	7	14	**28**

at Astrodome, Houston, Texas

- Date: October 24
- Game time: 12:00 p.m. CDT
- Game weather: None (indoor stadium)
- Game attendance: 50,039
- Box score

Game information

**First quarter**

- HOU – Gary Wellman 9-yard pass from Warren Moon (Al Del Greco kick). Oilers 7–0.

**Second quarter**

- CIN – Jeff Query 8-yard pass from Jay Schroeder (kick failed). Oilers 7–6.
- CIN – Doug Pelfrey 53-yard field goal. Bengals 9–7.

**Third quarter**

- CIN – Doug Pelfrey 50-yard field goal. Bengals 12–7.
- HOU – Lorenzo White 4-yard run (Al Del Greco kick). Oilers 14–12.

**Fourth quarter**

- HOU – Haywood Jeffires 11-yard pass from Warren Moon (Al Del Greco kick). Oilers 21–12.
- HOU – Gary Brown 25-yard run (Al Del Greco kick). Oilers 28–12.

**Top passers**

- CIN – Jay Schroeder – 17/31, 213 yards, TD
- HOU – Warren Moon – 24/34, 253 yards, 2 TD, INT

**Top rushers**

- CIN – Harold Green – 13 rushes, 47 yards
- HOU – Lorenzo White – 17 rushes, 63 yards, TD

**Top receivers**

- CIN – Carl Pickens – 7 receptions, 127 yards
- HOU – Haywood Jeffires – 7 receptions, 68 yards, TD

==== Week 10: vs. Seattle Seahawks ====
Week 10: Seattle Seahawks at Houston Oilers – Game summary

Quarter	1	2	3	4	Total
Seahawks	7	0	0	7	**14**
**Oilers**	13	9	2	0	**24**

at Astrodome, Houston, Texas

- Date: November 7
- Game time: 12:00 p.m. CST
- Game weather: None (indoor stadium)
- Game attendance: 50,447
- Referee: Howard Roe
- TV announcers (NBC): Dan Hicks and Joe Gibbs
- Box score

==== Week 11: at Cincinnati Bengals ====
Week 11: Houston Oilers at Cincinnati Bengals – Game summary

Quarter	1	2	3	4	Total
**Oilers**	7	21	10	0	**38**
Bengals	0	0	3	0	**3**

at Riverfront Stadium, Cincinnati, Ohio

- Date: November 14
- Game time: 12:00 p.m. CST/1:00 p.m. EST
- Game attendance: 42,347
- Box score

==== Week 12: at Cleveland Browns ====
Week 12: Houston Oilers at Cleveland Browns – Game summary

Quarter	1	2	3	4	Total
**Oilers**	0	14	3	10	**27**
Browns	3	7	0	10	**20**

at Cleveland Municipal Stadium, Cleveland, Ohio

- Date: November 21
- Game time: 12:00 p.m. CST/1:00 p.m. EST
- Game attendance: 71,668
- Box score

==== Week 13: vs. Pittsburgh Steelers ====
Week 13: Pittsburgh Steelers at Houston Oilers – Game summary

Quarter	1	2	3	4	Total
Steelers	0	3	0	0	**3**
**Oilers**	0	10	10	3	**23**

at Astrodome, Houston, Texas

- Date: November 28
- Game time: 7:00 p.m. CST
- Game weather: None (indoor stadium)
- Game attendance: 61,238
- Referee: Gerald Austin
- TV announcers (ESPN): Mike Patrick and Joe Theismann
- Box score

==== Week 14: vs. Atlanta Falcons ====
Week 14: Atlanta Falcons at Houston Oilers – Game summary

Quarter	1	2	3	4	Total
Falcons	0	7	7	3	**17**
**Oilers**	3	3	14	13	**33**

at Astrodome, Houston, Texas

- Date: December 5
- Game time: 12:00 p.m. CST
- Game weather: None (indoor stadium)
- Game attendance: 58,186
- Box score

==== Week 15: vs. Cleveland Browns ====
Week 15: Cleveland Browns at Houston Oilers – Game summary

Quarter	1	2	3	4	Total
Browns	10	0	7	0	**17**
**Oilers**	3	13	0	3	**19**

at Astrodome, Houston, Texas

- Date: December 12
- Game time: 12:00 p.m. CST
- Game weather: None (indoor stadium)
- Game attendance: 58,720
- Box score

==== Week 16: at Pittsburgh Steelers ====
Week 16: Houston Oilers at Pittsburgh Steelers – Game summary

Quarter	1	2	3	4	Total
**Oilers**	14	6	3	3	**26**
Steelers	0	3	7	7	**17**

at Three Rivers Stadium, Pittsburgh, Pennsylvania

- Date: December 19
- Game time: 12:00 p.m. CST/1:00 p.m. EST
- Game weather: Cloudy, 37 °F (3 °C)
- Game attendance: 57,592
- Referee: Bernie Kukar
- TV announcers (NBC): Tom Hammond and Cris Collinsworth
- Box score

5 days after Jeff Alm's tragic death, the Oilers secured their 9th consecutive win in a row by sweeping the Steelers to improve to 10-4 and clinched the AFC Central.

==== Week 17: at San Francisco 49ers ====
Week 17: Houston Oilers at San Francisco 49ers – Game summary

Quarter	1	2	3	4	Total
**Oilers**	0	10	0	0	**10**
49ers	0	0	0	7	**7**

at Candlestick Park, San Francisco, California

- Date: December 25
- Game time: 4:30 p.m. CST/2:30 p.m. PST
- Game attendance: 61,744
- Box score

Despite being held to 10 points, the Oilers won their 10th straight game to improve to 11-4. A Chiefs loss to Minnesota the next day would result in Houston clinching the #2 seed in the AFC and a first-round bye.

==== Week 18: vs. New York Jets ====
Week 18: New York Jets at Houston Oilers – Game summary

Quarter	1	2	3	4	Total
Jets	0	0	0	0	**0**
**Oilers**	7	7	3	7	**24**

at Astrodome, Houston, Texas

- Date: January 2, 1994
- Game time: 7:00 p.m. CST
- Game weather: None (indoor stadium)
- Game attendance: 61,040
- TV announcers (ESPN): Mike Patrick and Joe Theismann
- Box score

Game information

**First quarter**

- HOU – Ernest Givins 22-yard pass from Cody Carlson (Al Del Greco kick). Oilers 7–0.

**Second quarter**

- HOU – Gary Brown 8-yard pass from Cody Carlson (Al Del Greco kick). Oilers 14–0.

**Third quarter**

- HOU – Al Del Greco 38-yard field goal. Oilers 17–0.

**Fourth quarter**

- HOU – Gary Brown 16-yard run (Al Del Greco kick). Oilers 24–0.

**Top passers**

- NYJ – Boomer Esiason – 11/26, 119 yards, INT
- HOU – Cody Carlson – 23/38, 247 yards, 2 TD, INT

**Top rushers**

- NYJ – Johnny Johnson – 12 rushes, 42 yards
- HOU – Gary Brown – 22 rushes, 85 yards, TD

**Top receivers**

- NYJ – Johnny Mitchell – 1 reception, 43 yards
- HOU – Gary Wellman – 8 receptions, 106 yards

With the AFC Central and a first-round bye locked up, the Oilers rested many of their starters against the Jets. The game became notorious for an incident that occurred near the end of the first half. Fourth-year offensive coordinator Kevin Gilbride and first-year defensive coordinator Buddy Ryan had budded heads since Ryan's arrival in the offseason. Things boiled over in the second quarter when Gilbride called a pass play that resulted in a sack and fumble by quarterback Cody Carlson. Ryan walked over to Gilbride while yelling at him, with Gilbride yelling at Ryan in return. Ryan then threw a punch at Gilbride before the two were separated by players. After the incident, Gilbride reportedly never spoke to Ryan again.

Despite the incident, the Oilers would shutout the Jets 24–0. Houston finished the season 12–4 for the best record in franchise history up to the point. The Oilers also finished the season with an eleven game win streak after having started the season 1–4.

=== Standings ===
AFC Central
	W	L	T	PCT	PF	PA	STK
^{(2)} Houston Oilers	12	4	0	.750	368	238	W11
^{(6)} Pittsburgh Steelers	9	7	0	.563	308	281	W1
Cleveland Browns	7	9	0	.438	304	307	L1
Cincinnati Bengals	3	13	0	.188	187	319	L1

== Playoffs ==
=== AFC Divisional Playoffs: vs. (3) Kansas City Chiefs ===
AFC Divisional Playoffs: (3) Kansas City Chiefs at (2) Houston Oilers – Game summary

Quarter	1	2	3	4	Total
Chiefs	0	0	7	21	28
Oilers	10	0	0	10	20

at Astrodome, Houston, Texas

- Date: January 16, 1994
- Game time: 3:00 p.m. CST
- Game weather: None (indoor stadium)
- Game attendance: 64,011
- Referee: Gerald Austin
- TV announcers (NBC): Dick Enberg and Bob Trumpy
- Box score

Game information

First quarter

- HOU – Al Del Greco 49-yard field goal. Oilers 3–0.
- HOU – Gary Brown 2-yard run (Al Del Greco kick). Oilers 10–0.

Second quarter

- No scoring plays

Third quarter

- KC – Keith Cash 7-yard pass from Joe Montana (Nick Lowery kick). Oilers 10–7.

Fourth quarter

- HOU – Al Del Greco 43-yard field goal. Oilers 13–7.
- KC – J. J. Birden 11-yard pass from Joe Montana (Nick Lowery kick). Chiefs 14–13.
- KC – Willie Davis 18-yard pass from Joe Montana (Nick Lowery kick). Chiefs 21–13.
- HOU – Ernest Givens 7-yard pass from Warren Moon (Al Del Greco kick). Chiefs 21–20.
- KC – Marcus Allen 21-yard run (Nick Lowery kick). Chiefs 28–20.

Top passers

- KC – Joe Montana – 22/38, 299 yards, 3 TD, 2 INT
- HOU – Warren Moon – 32/43, 306 yards, TD, INT

Top rushers

- KC – Marcus Allen – 14 rushes, 74 yards, TD
- HOU – Gary Brown – 11 rushes, 17 yards, TD

Top receivers

- KC – Willie Davis – 5 receptions, 96 yards, TD
- HOU – Haywood Jeffires – 9 receptions, 88 yards

Chiefs quarterback Joe Montana threw three touchdown passes in the second half to give his team a 28–20 win. The Oilers jumped to a 10–0 lead in the first quarter with kicker Al Del Greco's 49-yard field goal and running back Gary Brown's 2-yard touchdown. Then after a scoreless second period, Montana threw a 7-yard touchdown pass to tight end Keith Cash in the third quarter. In the fourth period, Del Greco kicked a 43-yard field goal to give Houston a 13–7 lead. But aided by a 38-yard pass interference penalty, the Chiefs advanced 71 yards to score on wide receiver J. J. Birden's 11-yard touchdown reception from Montana. On the Oilers' next possession, Kansas City defensive lineman Dan Saleaumua recovered a fumble by Houston quarterback Warren Moon, setting up Montana's 18-yard touchdown pass to wide receiver Willie Davis. The Oilers then drove 80 yards to score on wide receiver Ernest Givins' 7-yard touchdown catch, but the Chiefs responded with running back Marcus Allen's game-clinching 21-yard touchdown that capped off a 79-yard drive to go up two scores (the NFL would not introduce the two-point conversion until the following season).

== Awards and records ==
- Haywood Jeffires, Pro Bowl Selection
- Warren Moon, Pro Bowl Selection
- Bruce Mathews, Pro Bowl Selection
- Greg Montgomery, Pro Bowl Selection
- Ray Childress, Pro Bowl Selection
- Mike Munchak, Pro Bowl Selection
- Sean Jones, Pro Bowl Selection
- Webster Slaughter, Pro Bowl Selection

== Milestones ==
The January 16th game marked the last time the Oilers would play a playoff game while playing in Houston. It was not until their third year in Tennessee, which by that time saw the team renamed the Titans, that the team would return to the playoffs; in that season the franchise advanced all the way to the Super Bowl.

Houston itself would not see another NFL playoff game until the Houston Texans, the successors to the Oilers who entered the league in 2002, hosted a Wild Card playoff game at Reliant Stadium in early 2012.

As of the end of the 2021 season, the Oilers/Titans franchise has only seen five division titles since 1993 (2000 in the AFC Central, 2002, 2008, 2020, and 2021 in the AFC South). In all five of those seasons, the franchise failed to advance to the Super Bowl, and in three of those years the team was defeated as the AFC's #1 seed. The Titans, however, have made ten playoff appearances since the team moved to Tennessee in 1997 and have won eight playoff games, the most recent in 2019 when they defeated the Ravens in a Divisional matchup. Incidentally, the Tennessee Titans victory against the Patriots in the Wild Card playoff game was the first victory the organization achieved in Foxboro since October 17, 1993, when the organization was still based out of Houston as the Oilers.

== See also ==
- List of NFL teams affected by internal conflict
