= 1958 Pittsburgh Steelers season =

NFL team season

- Head coach: Buddy Parker
- Home stadium: Pitt Stadium

Results
- Record: 7–4–1
- Division place: 3rd NFL Eastern
- Playoffs: Did not qualify

The 1958 Pittsburgh Steelers season was the franchise's 26th in the National Football League. Coming off a 6–6 result in 1957, the Steelers began playing some home games at a new venue, the University of Pittsburgh's 60,000 seat Pitt Stadium, a significantly larger facility than the 40,000 seat Forbes Field. Despite the superior accommodations of Pitt Stadium, the Steelers never in 1958 drew more than the 31,130 fans they brought out to their season opener.

== Background ==
=== Layne trade ===
After the second game of the season, Steelers coach Buddy Parker arranged a trade on October 6 that sent quarterback Earl Morrall and two draft picks to the Detroit Lions for quarterback Bobby Layne. a future hall of famer.

=== Ticketing and attendance ===
With optimistic expectations about the growth of the NFL, the Steelers moved to a new larger facility for the 1958 season, the University of Pittsburgh's Pitt Stadium. Designed for football rather than baseball, the Pitt facility offered seating for 60,000 — dwarfing the 40,000 seat capacity of venerable Forbes Field. Despite the enlarged and improved accommodations, the Steelers drew their largest home crowd for the season opener, October 5 against the Cleveland Browns — one of the best teams in the league during the decade of the 1950s — with 31,130 ticketed people through the gate.

The Steelers priced tickets in three price tiers in 1958 — $3.00 seats, $5.00 seats, and $6.00 seats. Season ticket booklets for the 6 regular season games were priced at $15.00, $30.00, and $36.00, respectively.

== Pre-season ==
=== Schedule ===
Game	Date	Opponent	Result	Record	Venue	Location	Attendance	Sources
1	August 16	vs. Cleveland Browns	L 0–10	0–1	Rubber Bowl	Akron, OH	27,202	
2	August 20	at Green Bay Packers	W 3–0	1–1	County Stadium	Milwaukee, WI	17,294	
3	August 30	Chicago Bears	L 10–17	1–2	Pitt Stadium	Pittsburgh	16,029	
4	September 6	vs. Baltimore Colts	W 13–10	2–2	Civic Stadium	Buffalo, NY	8,661	
5	September 12	vs. Chicago Cardinals	L 7–21	2–3	Busch Stadium	St. Louis, MO	25,302	
6	September 21	Los Angeles Rams	L 6–31	2–4	Memorial Coliseum	Los Angeles	26,396	

== Regular season ==
=== Schedule ===
Game	Date	Opponent	Result	Record	Venue	Attendance	Recap	Sources
1	September 28	at San Francisco 49ers	**L** 20–23	0–1	Kezar Stadium	51,856	Recap	
2	October 5	**Cleveland Browns**	**L** 12–45	0–2	Pitt Stadium	31,130	Recap	
3	October 12	**Philadelphia Eagles**	**W** 24–3	1–2	Forbes Field	23,153	Recap	
4	October 19	at **Cleveland Browns**	**L** 10–27	1–3	Cleveland Stadium	66,852	Recap	
5	October 26	at **New York Giants**	**L** 6–17	1–4	Yankee Stadium	25,007	Recap	
6	November 2	**Washington Redskins**	**W** 24–16	2–4	Forbes Field	19,525	Recap	
7	November 9	at **Philadelphia Eagles**	**W** 31–24	3–4	Franklin Field	26,306	Recap	
8	November 16	**New York Giants**	**W** 31–10	4–4	Forbes Field	30,030	Recap	
9	November 23	at **Chicago Cardinals**	**W** 27–20	5–4	Comiskey Park	15,946	Recap	
10	November 30	Chicago Bears	**W** 24–10	6–4	Forbes Field	20,094	Recap	
11	December 7	at **Washington Redskins**	**T** 14–14	6–4–1	Griffith Stadium	23,370	Recap	
12	December 13	**Chicago Cardinals**	**W** 38–21	7–4–1	Pitt Stadium	16,660	Recap	
Note: Conference opponents in **Bold**.

== Standings ==
NFL Eastern Conference
	W	L	T	PCT	CONF	PF	PA	STK
New York Giants	9	3	0	.750	7–3	246	183	W4
Cleveland Browns	9	3	0	.750	8–2	302	217	L1
Pittsburgh Steelers	7	4	1	.636	6–3–1	261	230	W1
Washington Redskins	4	7	1	.364	3–6–1	214	268	W1
Chicago Cardinals	2	9	1	.182	2–7–1	261	356	L6
Philadelphia Eagles	2	9	1	.182	2–7–1	235	306	L4

Note: Tie games were not officially counted in the standings until 1972.

== Game summaries ==
=== Game 1 (Sunday September 28, 1958): San Francisco 49ers ===
	1	2	3	4	Total
Steelers	0	7	13	0	20
49ers	7	0	6	10	23

at Kezar Stadium, San Francisco, California

- Game time:
- Game weather:
- Game attendance: 32,150
- Referee:

Scoring Drives:

- San Francisco – McElhenny 2 run (Soltau kick)
- Pittsburgh – Mathews 10 pass from Morrall (Miner kick)
- Pittsburgh – FG Miner 22
- Pittsburgh – Younger 1 run (Miner kick)
- Pittsburgh – FG Miner 23
- San Francisco – Pace 11 run (kick blocked)
- San Francisco – Brodie 1 run (Soltau kick)
- San Francisco – FG Soltau 22

=== Game 2 (Sunday October 5, 1958): Cleveland Browns ===
	1	2	3	4	Total
Browns	7	17	14	7	45
Steelers	0	10	0	2	12

at Pitt Stadium Pittsburgh, Pennsylvania

- Game time:
- Game weather:
- Game attendance: 31,130
- Referee:
- TV announcers:

Scoring Drives:

- Cleveland – Brown 23 run (Groza kick)
- Cleveland – Mitchell 21 pass from Plum (Groza kick)
- Cleveland – Brewster 8 pass from Plum (Groza kick)
- Pittsburgh – Tracy 1 run (Miner kick)
- Pittsburgh – FG Miner 31
- Cleveland – FG Groza 32
- Cleveland – Brown 59 run (Groza kick)
- Cleveland – Brown 3 run (Groza kick)
- Cleveland – P. Carpenter 4 pass from Ninowski (Groza kick)
- Pittsburgh – Safety, Ninowski tackled by Stautner in end zone

=== Game 3 (Sunday October 12, 1958): Philadelphia Eagles ===
	1	2	3	4	Total
Eagles	3	0	0	0	3
Steelers	14	7	3	0	24

at Forbes Field, Pittsburgh, Pennsylvania

- Game time:
- Game weather:
- Game attendance: 23,153
- Referee:

Scoring Drives:

- Pittsburgh – Tracy 31 run (Miner kick)
- Philadelphia – FG Walston 36
- Pittsburgh – Younger 1 run (Miner kick)
- Pittsburgh – Tracy 1 run (Miner kick)
- Pittsburgh – FG Miner 26

=== Game 4 (Sunday October 19, 1958): Cleveland Browns ===
	1	2	3	4	Total
Steelers	7	0	0	3	10
Browns	7	14	0	6	27

at Cleveland Municipal Stadium, Cleveland, Ohio

- Game time:
- Game weather:
- Game attendance: 66,852
- Referee:
- TV announcers:

Scoring Drives:

- Pittsburgh – Mathews 64 pass from Tracy (Miner kick)
- Cleveland – Brown 27 pass from Plum (Groza kick)
- Cleveland – Brown 48 run (Plum kick)
- Cleveland – Renfro 36 pass from Plum (Plum kick)
- Cleveland – Mitchell 7 pass from Plum (kick failed)
- Pittsburgh – FG Miner 47

=== Game 5 (Sunday October 26, 1958): New York Giants ===
	1	2	3	4	Total
Steelers	0	3	3	0	6
Giants	7	3	0	7	17

at Yankee Stadium, Bronx, New York

- Game time:
- Game weather:
- Game attendance: 25,007
- Referee:

Scoring Drives:

- New York Giants – Karilivacz 23 fumble run (Summerall kick)
- Pittsburgh – FG Miner 27
- New York Giants – FG Summerall 34
- Pittsburgh – FG Miner 39
- New York Giants – Heinrich 1 run (Summerall kick)

=== Game 6 (Sunday November 2, 1958): Washington Redskins ===
	1	2	3	4	Total
Redskins	3	3	0	10	16
Steelers	0	14	0	10	24

at Forbes Field, Pittsburgh, Pennsylvania

- Game time:
- Game weather:
- Game attendance: 19,525
- Referee:

Scoring Drives:

- Washington – FG Baker 13
- Pittsburgh – Orr 19 pass from Layne (Miner kick)
- Pittsburgh – Younger 2 run (Miner kick)
- Washington – FG Baker 27
- Pittsburgh – Mathews 62 pass from Layne (Miner kick)
- Washington – FG Baker 32
- Pittsburgh – FG Miner 43
- Washington – Walton 26 pass from Guglielmi (Baker kick)

=== Game 7 (Sunday November 9, 1958): Philadelphia Eagles ===
	1	2	3	4	Total
Steelers	3	14	14	0	31
Eagles	7	3	7	7	24

at Franklin Field, Philadelphia, Pennsylvania

- Game time:
- Game weather:
- Game attendance: 26,306
- Referee:

Scoring Drives:

- Pittsburgh – FG Miner 38
- Philadelphia – Retzlaff 18 pass from Barnes (Walston kick)
- Pittsburgh – Tracy 13 pass from Layne (Miner kick)
- Pittsburgh – Tracy 25 pass from Layne (Miner kick)
- Philadelphia – FG Walston 16
- Philadelphia – Barnes 3 run (Walston kick)
- Pittsburgh – Mathews 34 pass from Layne (Miner kick)
- Pittsburgh – Tracy 40 pass from Layne (Miner kick)
- Philadelphia – McDonald 10 pass from Van Brocklin (Walston kick)

=== Game 8 (Sunday November 16, 1958): New York Giants ===
	1	2	3	4	Total
Giants	7	3	0	0	10
Steelers	0	7	14	10	31

at Forbes Field, Pittsburgh, Pennsylvania

- Game time:
- Game weather:
- Game attendance: 30,030
- Referee:

Scoring Drives:

- New York Giants – Gifford 1 run (Summerall kick)
- New York Giants – FG Summerall 42
- Pittsburgh – Layne 1 run (Miner kick)
- Pittsburgh – Tracy 9 pass from Layne (Miner kick)
- Pittsburgh – Glick 37 fumble run (Miner kick)
- Pittsburgh – FG Miner 43 (Miner kick)
- Pittsburgh – Layne 1 run (Miner kick)

=== Game 9 (Sunday November 23, 1958): Chicago Cardinals ===
	1	2	3	4	Total
Steelers	10	10	0	7	27
Cardinals	10	3	7	0	20

at Comiskey Park, Chicago, Illinois

- Game time:
- Game weather:
- Game attendance: 15,946
- Referee:

Scoring Drives:

- Chicago Cardinals – Matson 101 kick return (Conrad kick)
- Pittsburgh – Elter 5 run (Miner kick)
- Pittsburgh – FG Miner 37
- Chicago Cardinals – FG Conrad 38
- Pittsburgh – Elter 8 run (Miner kick)
- Pittsburgh – FG Miner 30
- Chicago Cardinals – FG Conrad 12
- Chicago Cardinals – Matson 1 run (Conrad kick)
- Pittsburgh – Orr 78 pass from Layne (Miner kick)

=== Game 10 (Sunday November 30, 1958): Chicago Bears ===
	1	2	3	4	Total
Bears	0	0	0	10	10
Steelers	7	3	0	14	24

at Forbes Field, Pittsburgh, Pennsylvania

- Game time:
- Game weather:
- Game attendance: 20,094
- Referee:

Scoring Drives:

- Pittsburgh – Tracy 30 run (Miner kick)
- Pittsburgh – FG Miner 22
- Chicago Bears – Jewett 13 pass from Brown (Blanda kick)
- Chicago Bears – FG Blanda 34
- Pittsburgh – Orr 48 pass from Layne (Miner kick)
- Pittsburgh – Tracy 18 run (Miner kick)

=== Game 11 (Sunday December 7, 1958): Washington Redskins ===
	1	2	3	4	Total
Steelers	0	0	7	7	14
Redskins	0	14	0	0	14

at Griffith Stadium, Washington, DC

- Game time:
- Game weather:
- Game attendance: 23,370
- Referee:

Scoring Drives:

- Washington – Bosseler 7 run (Baker kick)
- Washington – Bosseler 2 run (Baker kick)
- Pittsburgh – Orr 55 pass from Layne (Miner kick)
- Pittsburgh – McClairen 28 pass from Layne (Miner kick)

=== Game 12 (Saturday December 13, 1958): Chicago Cardinals ===
	1	2	3	4	Total
Cardinals	0	7	14	0	21
Steelers	0	17	7	14	38

at Pitt Stadium, Pittsburgh, Pennsylvania

- Game time:
- Game weather: Sunny, cold (the water pipes in Pitt Stadium froze)
- Game attendance: 16,660
- Referee:

Scoring Drives:

- Pittsburgh – Orr 36 pass from Layne (Miner kick)
- Chicago Cardinals – Matson 92 kick return (Conrad kick)
- Pittsburgh – FG Miner 13
- Pittsburgh – Layne 17 run (Miner kick)
- Chicago Cardinals – Watkins 48 pass from Reynolds (Conrad kick)
- Pittsburgh – Orr 17 pass from Layne (Miner kick)
- Chicago Cardinals – Matson 1 run (Conrad kick)
- Pittsburgh – Orr 72 pass from Tracy (Miner kick)
- Pittsburgh – Reynolds 5 run (Miner kick)

== Roster ==
1958 Pittsburgh Steelers roster
Quarterbacks (QB): 16 Len Dawson; 22 Bobby Layne; Running backs (RB): 20 Dick Christy; 34 Leo Elter; 25 Ray Mathews; 46 Billy Reynolds; 30 Tom Tracy; 35 Tank Younger; Wide receivers (WR): 85 Don Bishop; 87 Cy McClairen; 86 Jimmy Orr P; Tight ends (TE)	Offensive linemen (OL): 57 Ed Beatty C; 72 Darrell Dess T/G; 61 Ted Karras T; 64 Bill Krisher G; 65 John Nisby G; 62 Mike Sandusky G/T; 79 John Simerson T; 74 Frank Varrichione T; Defensive linemen (DL): 75 Joe Krupa DT; 71 Joe Lewis DT; 77 Billy Ray Smith DE; 70 Ernie Stautner DE/DT; 82 George Tarasovic DE	Linebackers (LB): 66 Dick Campbell OLB/C; 60 Dale Dodrill MLB; 68 Bob Dougherty OLB; 89 Dick Lasse MLB/OLB; 50 John Reger OLB; Defensive backs (DB): 42 Dick Alban CB; 80 Jack Butler S; 27 Dean Derby S/CB; 26 Gary Glick CB; 24 Dick McCabe S; Special teams (ST): 88 Tom Miner K	Reserve: 83 Dick Lucas WR (IR); Rookies in italics
