= Tracy Scroggins =

American football player (1969–2026)

No. 59, 97
- Positions: Linebacker, defensive end

Personal information
- Born: September 11, 1969; Checotah, Oklahoma, U.S.
- Died: February 9, 2026 (aged 56); Hollywood, Florida, U.S.
- Listed height: 6 ft 3 in (1.91 m)
- Listed weight: 273 lb (124 kg)

Career information
- High school: Checotah
- College: Tulsa
- NFL draft: 1992: 2nd round, 53rd overall pick

Career history
- Detroit Lions (1992–2001)

Career NFL statistics
- Tackles: 321
- Sacks: 60.5
- Interceptions: 1
- Stats at Pro Football Reference

Tracy L. Scroggins (September 11, 1969 – February 9, 2026) was an American professional football player who spent his entire 10-year career as a defensive end and a linebacker for the Detroit Lions of the National Football League (NFL). He played college football for the Tulsa Golden Hurricane.

== Early life ==
Scroggins attended high school at Checotah High School in Checotah, Oklahoma.

== College career ==
Scroggins attended Coffeyville Community College. He graduated from the University of Tulsa.

== Career ==
Pre-draft measurables
Height	Weight	Arm length	Hand span	40-yard dash	10-yard split	20-yard split	20-yard shuttle	Vertical jump	Broad jump	Bench press
6 ft 2 3/4 in (1.90 m)	255 lb (116 kg)	32 5/8 in (0.83 m)	9 5/8 in (0.24 m)	4.67 s	1.66 s	2.71 s	4.36 s	36.5 in (0.93 m)	10 ft 0 in (3.05 m)	18 reps

Scroggins played for the Detroit Lions football team for ten seasons. He was selected in the second round of the 1992 NFL draft with the 53rd overall pick.

== Death ==
Scroggins died on February 9, 2026, at the age of 56. According to his family, he struggled for years with chronic traumatic encephalopathy (CTE).
