= Greg Montgomery =

American football player (1964–2020)

No. 9
- Position: Punter

Personal information
- Born: October 29, 1964; Morristown, New Jersey, U.S.
- Died: August 23, 2020 (aged 55); Grand Rapids, Michigan, U.S.
- Listed height: 6 ft 4 in (1.93 m)
- Listed weight: 215 lb (98 kg)

Career information
- High school: Red Bank Regional (Little Silver, New Jersey)
- College: Penn State; Michigan State
- NFL draft: 1988: 3rd round, 72nd overall pick

Career history
- Houston Oilers (1988–1993); Detroit Lions (1994); Baltimore Ravens (1996–1997)

Awards and highlights
- Pro Bowl (1993); First-team All-American (1986); Second-team All-American (1987); 3× First-team All-Big Ten (1985, 1986, 1987)

Career NFL statistics
- Punts: 524
- Punting yards: 22,831
- Longest punt: 77
- Stats at Pro Football Reference

Gregory Hugh Montgomery Jr. (October 29, 1964 – August 23, 2020) was an American professional football player who was an All-Pro punter for nine seasons in the National Football League (NFL).

Born in Morristown, New Jersey, and raised in Shrewsbury, Montgomery played football at Red Bank Regional High School, where he had hoped to be a linebacker rather than a punter.

Montgomery spent his freshman collegiate year at Penn State, but then transferred to Michigan State, where his father had played quarterback thirty years earlier.

As a junior, he was honored by the Football Writers Association of America (FWAA) as a first-team All-American, and as a senior he was selected to the second-team by United Press International. In 1996, Montgomery was chosen for the MSU Centennial Super Squad.

Montgomery was selected in the third round of the 1988 NFL draft by the Houston Oilers.

From 1988 to 1997 he spent time with the Houston Oilers, Detroit Lions, and Baltimore Ravens. In his nine NFL seasons, Montgomery led the NFL in yards per punt average three times (1990, 1992, 1993), was selected to one Pro Bowl and First-team All-Pro (1993), and finished his career with 22,831 punting yards and 120 punts inside the opponents 20 yard line. His longest punt of 77 yards was with the Houston Oilers.

== NFL career statistics ==
Legend
| | Led the league |
| **Bold** | Career high |

=== Regular season ===
| Year | Team | Punting | | | | | | | | | |
| Year | Team | GP | Punts | Yds | Net Yds | Lng | Avg | Net Avg | Blk | Ins20 | TB |
|---|---|---|---|---|---|---|---|---|---|---|---|
| 1988 | HOU | **16** | 65 | 2,523 | 2,217 | 61 | 38.8 | 34.1 | 0 | 12 | 5 |
| 1989 | HOU | **16** | 56 | 2,422 | 2,091 | 63 | 43.3 | 36.1 | **2** | 15 | 7 |
| 1990 | HOU | **16** | 34 | 1,530 | 1,244 | 60 | 45.0 | 36.6 | 0 | 7 | 5 |
| 1991 | HOU | 15 | 48 | 2,105 | 1,842 | 60 | 43.9 | 36.8 | **2** | 13 | 4 |
| 1992 | HOU | **16** | 53 | 2,487 | 2,052 | 66 | **46.9** | 37.3 | **2** | 14 | **9** |
| 1993 | HOU | 15 | 54 | 2,462 | 2,113 | **77** | 45.6 | **39.1** | 0 | 13 | 5 |
| 1994 | DET | **16** | 63 | 2,782 | 2,191 | 64 | 44.2 | 34.2 | 1 | 19 | 8 |
| 1996 | BAL | **16** | 68 | 2,980 | 2,607 | 67 | 43.8 | 37.8 | 1 | 23 | 5 |
| 1997 | BAL | **16** | **83** | **3,540** | **3,040** | 60 | 42.7 | 36.6 | 0 | **24** | 2 |
| Career | | 142 | 524 | 22,831 | 19,397 | 77 | 43.6 | 36.5 | 8 | 140 | 50 |

=== Playoffs ===
| Year | Team | Punting | | | | | | | | | |
| Year | Team | GP | Punts | Yds | Net Yds | Lng | Avg | Net Avg | Blk | Ins20 | TB |
|---|---|---|---|---|---|---|---|---|---|---|---|
| 1988 | HOU | **2** | **8** | **336** | 253 | 51 | 42.0 | 28.1 | **1** | 0 | 0 |
| 1989 | HOU | 1 | 3 | 132 | 112 | 48 | 44.0 | 28.0 | **1** | 0 | 0 |
| 1990 | HOU | 1 | 6 | 256 | 194 | 47 | 42.7 | 32.3 | 0 | **2** | **1** |
| 1991 | HOU | **2** | 3 | 133 | 113 | 50 | 44.3 | **37.7** | 0 | 1 | **1** |
| 1992 | HOU | 1 | 2 | 49 | 49 | 25 | 24.5 | 24.5 | 0 | 0 | 0 |
| 1993 | HOU | 1 | 5 | 243 | 179 | **59** | **48.6** | 35.8 | 0 | 1 | **1** |
| 1994 | DET | 1 | **8** | 292 | **257** | 45 | 36.5 | 32.1 | 0 | 0 | **1** |
| Career | | 9 | 35 | 1,441 | 1,157 | 59 | 41.2 | 31.3 | 2 | 4 | 4 |

== Post-playing career ==
In 2003, Montgomery started ZenPunt 5.0, and was the company's president/CEO.

Montgomery died on August 23, 2020, in Grand Rapids, Michigan, after succumbing to a long-term illness.
