= Tom Miner =

American football player (1932–1988)

- Miner, circa 1950

No. 80, 71, 74, 88
- Positions: End, placekicker

Personal information
- Born: May 14, 1932; Checotah, Oklahoma, U.S.
- Died: January 1, 1988 (aged 55); Tucson, Arizona, U.S.
- Listed height: 6 ft 3 in (1.91 m)
- Listed weight: 235 lb (107 kg)

Career information
- High school: Checotah
- College: Tulsa (1950–1953)
- NFL draft: 1954: 3rd round, 31st overall pick

Career history
- Calgary Stampeders (1954–1955); Winnipeg Blue Bombers (1956); Pittsburgh Steelers (1958)
- Stats at Pro Football Reference

Thomas Earl Miner (May 14, 1932 – January 1, 1988) was an American professional football player in the National Football League (NFL) and Western Interprovincial Football Union (WIFU). He played college football for the Tulsa Golden Hurricane, and was selected by the Pittsburgh Steelers in the third round of the 1954 NFL draft. He played end/placekicker in the WIFU and placekicker in the NFL. Miner led the NFL in field goals in 1958.

== Early life ==
Thomas Earl Miner was born on May 14, 1932, in Checotah, Oklahoma. He played high school football, basketball, and baseball at Checotah High School, earning 12 varsity letters overall. He scored 70 points during his senior year of football, earning all-state honors at end. Miner averaged 18.7 points per game as a center in basketball as a senior. He was recruited by many college to play college football. In March 1950, the McIntosh County Democrat called Miner the "greatest all-around athlete" to ever come out of McIntosh County, Oklahoma.

== College career ==
Miner enrolled at the University of Tulsa to play college football for the Golden Hurricane. He was on the freshman team in 1950 and the varsity team from 1951 to 1953. He garnered All-Missouri Valley Conference recognition at end from 1951 to 1953. Miner led the country in extra points in 1952, converting 41 of 45 attempts. He finished his college career with 83 field goals made on 98 attempts. At the conclusion of his college career, he played in the 1953 North–South Shrine Game. Miner majored in business administration at Tulsa.

== Professional career ==
On December 29, 1953, Miner signed with the Calgary Stampeders of the Western Interprovincial Football Union as an end. On January 28, 1954, he was selected by the Pittsburgh Steelers in the third round, with the 31st overall pick, of the 1954 NFL draft. He played in 15 of 16 games for the Stampeders during the 1954 season, recording 24 receptions for 298 yards and one touchdown, 40 kickoffs for 2,146 yards, 14 of 30 field goals, 33 of 36 extra points, and four rouges as the Stampeders finished 8–8. Miner's 84 points were second in the WIFU behind Joe Aguirre's 85. They also both broke the league field goal record set by Bud Korchak in 1953. The Province noted that Aguirre and Miner were notably missing from the 1954 WIFU All-Star Team. Miner appeared in all 16 games for the Stampeders in 1955, totaling ten catches for 108 yards and one touchdown, 35 kickoffs for 1,818 yards, one of nine field goals, 28 of 31 extra points, and four rouges as Calgary went 4–12.

On March 20, 1956, it was reported that Miner had been traded to the Winnipeg Blue Bombers for Dick Huffman, Harry Wilson, and John Bodrug. Miner played in all 16 games for Winnipeg in 1956, accumulating five receptions for 67 yards, eight of 15 field goals, two of six extra points, two rouges, and six fumble recoveries for 88 yards and one touchdown. The Blue Bombers finished the 1956 season with a 9–7 record and lost in the WIFU semifinals to the Saskatchewan Roughriders. Miner became a free agent after the season. In January 1957, it was reported that he would likely not play in 1957 due to knee issues. He served as an assistant football coach at Tulsa while sitting out the 1957 season.

On April 30 1958, Miner signed with the Steelers as a kicking specialist. He played in all 12 games for the Steelers during the 1958 season, scoring 31 of 31 extra points and 14 of 28 field goals. He led the NFL in both field goals made and field goals attempted. The Steelers went 7–4–1, good for third in the Eastern Conference. Miner was released on September 25, 1959, a day before the start of the 1959 regular season.

== Personal life ==
Miner was an assistant football coach at Tulsa again from 1960 to 1962. He entered the sporting goods business in 1963. He was also a scout for the San Diego Chargers. Miner became the Chargers' vice president in charge of player relations in December 1971. He later served as a west coast scout for the Cleveland Browns for 12 years, and afterwards as a west coast scout for the Atlanta Falcons. He died of a heart attack on January 1, 1988, at his home in Tucson, Arizona.
