= Billy Reynolds (American football) =

American football player (1931–2002)

No. 46, 88
- Position: Halfback

Personal information
- Born: July 20, 1931; St. Marys, West Virginia, U.S.
- Died: December 2, 2002 (aged 71); Bedford, Ohio, U.S.
- Listed height: 5 ft 11 in (1.80 m)
- Listed weight: 195 lb (88 kg)

Career information
- College: Pittsburgh
- NFL draft: 1953: 2nd round, 23rd overall pick

Career history
- Cleveland Browns (1953–1954, 1957); Pittsburgh Steelers (1958); Hamilton Tiger-Cats (1959); Oakland Raiders (1960)

Awards and highlights
- NFL champion (1954)

Career NFL/AFL statistics
- Rushing yards: 585
- Rushing average: 3.3
- Receptions: 24
- Receiving yards: 252
- Total touchdowns: 7
- Stats at Pro Football Reference

William Dean Reynolds (July 20, 1931 – December 2, 2002) was a professional American football halfback in the National Football League (NFL) and the American Football League (AFL). He played for the NFL's Cleveland Browns (1953–1954, 1957) and Pittsburgh Steelers (1958) and the AFL's Oakland Raiders (1960). He was absent from professional football in 1955 and 1956 while serving in the United States Air Force.

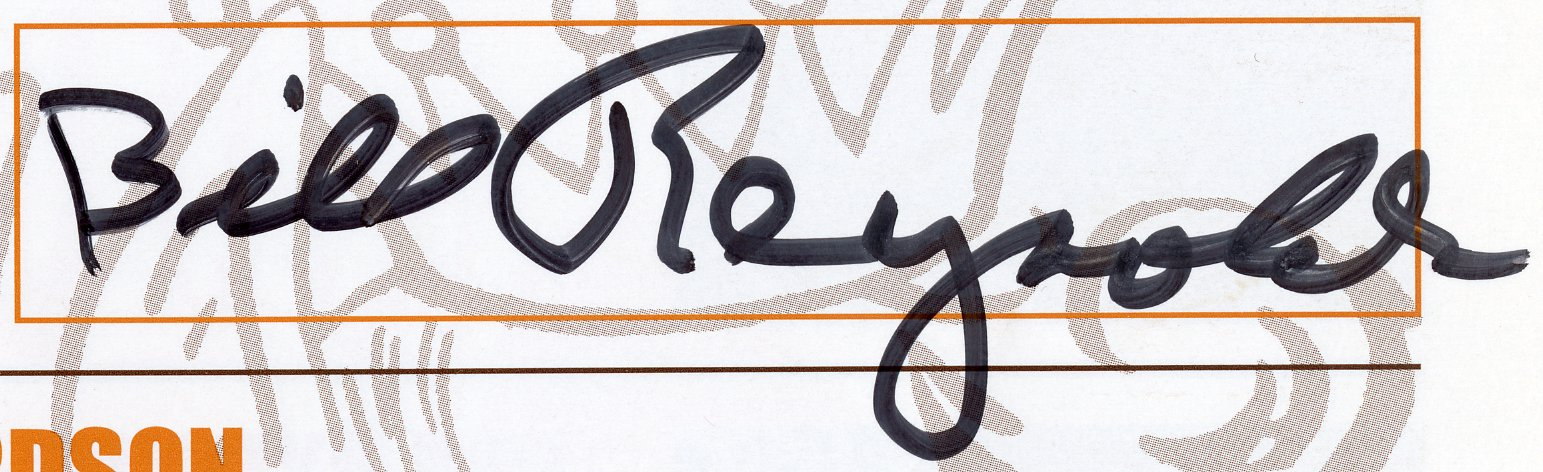
