= Sean Jones (defensive end) =

Jamaican gridiron football player (born 1962)

No. 99, 96
- Position: Defensive end

Personal information
- Born: December 19, 1962 (age 63); Kingston, Jamaica
- Listed height: 6 ft 7 in (2.01 m)
- Listed weight: 276 lb (125 kg)

Career information
- High school: Montclair Kimberley Academy (Montclair, New Jersey, U.S.)
- College: Northeastern
- NFL draft: 1984: 2nd round, 51st overall pick

Career history
- Los Angeles Raiders (1984–1987); Houston Oilers (1988–1993); Green Bay Packers (1994–1996)

Awards and highlights
- Super Bowl champion (XXXI); 2× Second-team All-Pro (1994, 1995); Pro Bowl (1993)

Career NFL statistics
- Tackles: 601
- Sacks: 113
- Interceptions: 1
- Fumble recoveries: 13
- Stats at Pro Football Reference

Dwight Andre Sean O'Neil Jones (born December 19, 1962) is a Jamaican-born former professional football defensive end, who played for the Los Angeles Raiders (1984–1987), Houston Oilers (1988–1993), and Green Bay Packers (1994–1996). He won Super Bowl XXXI with the Packers, beating the New England Patriots. Jones was selected to the Pro Bowl after the 1993 season. Sean Jones' brother Max Jones played college football at Massachusetts and later played professional football with the Birmingham Stallions in the USFL in 1984.

== College career ==
Jones attended Northeastern University, where he lettered for four years in football. At Northeastern he played on the offensive line his freshmen and sophomore seasons before flipping to the defensive side for his junior and senior season where he became a defensive presence.

Prior to attending Northeastern University, Jones graduated from the Montclair Kimberley Academy in Montclair, New Jersey where he played football, basketball and lacrosse.

Jones became a member of the Nu Phi graduate chapter of Omega Psi Phi fraternity in Houston, Texas in 2004.

== Professional career ==
Jones played the first four years of his career for the Los Angeles Raiders, who selected him in the second round of the 1984 NFL draft with the 51st overall pick. In Jones' third year, 1986, he had a career high 15.5 sacks and 74 tackles. In 1988 the Houston Oilers traded the ninth overall pick in the NFL draft for Jones. Jones went on to play six seasons for the Oilers, amassing 50 sacks during this time. In 1994, Jones signed with the Green Bay Packers as a free agent. Jones formed a bookend at defensive end with Reggie White. Jones retired after the Packers won Super Bowl XXXI on January 26, 1997. During his three years with the Packers, Jones had 24.5 sacks.

== Post NFL career ==
In 2001 and 2002, Jones was a reserve color commentator for the NFL on FOX.

In December 2003, arbitrator Roger Kaplan ruled that Jones violated National Football League Players Association regulations in his financial dealings with NFL player Ebenezer Ekuban. Jones received a two-year suspension, prohibiting him from representing NFL players until February 26, 2005. Jones later sued Ekuban and his attorney for slander and libel leading to Ekuban declaring bankruptcy in 2003. Former player Cris Dishman won a US$396,000 judgment against Jones involving a bad investment. Jones later counter-sued Cris Dishman and his former wife Karen Dishman; the previous matter was declared settled and Jones received a money judgment against both Cris and Karen Dishman in 2006 for their part in illegally trying to extort more money from Jones.

In January 2016, he became a co-host for KBME Houston. He now is the defensive coordinator for Cornell University Sprint Football.
