= Checotah High School =

Historic high school in Oklahoma

Location
- 491 Paul Carr Drive; Checotah, Oklahoma 74426; 35.4594°N 95.5355°W

Information
- School type: Public
- Established: 1914
- School district: Checotah Public Schools
- NCES District ID: 4007350
- Superintendent: Monte Madewell
- NCES School ID: 400735000290
- Principal: Jennifer Campbell
- Grades: 9-12
- Age range: 14-19
- Enrollment: 395
- Student to teacher ratio: 17.30
- Campus type: rural
- Colors: Blue and white
- Mascot: Wildcats

Checotah High School is a public school in Checotah, Oklahoma. In 2025 it had about 395 students in grades 9 to 12. It is categorized as rural. Almost 40 percent of its students are indigenous peoples. The Checotah school campus including the elementary and junior high school were documented as historic landmarks. They include a circa 1939 red brick building constructed by the WPA.. The school was accredited in 1914 by the state of Oklahoma. George W. Cable and then George C. Rorie served as principal. In 1916 it had a debate team. A photograph of the school's 1921 football team is held by the Oklahoma Historical Society. Students have been involved in vocational agriculture programs. A study of farming students was undertaken. There is a Checotah High School Jazz Band.

Country singer Carrie Underwood is an alumna and has made a series of donations to the school. The school's Fine Arts wing is named for her.

Greg Dixon was a star football player for the school and went on to play for successful University of Oklahoma teams. Football player Elijah Thomas was named 2024-25 Gatorade Oklahoma Football Player of the Year. He signed on to play at Oklahoma University.

The school's Hall of Fame includes Tracy Scroggins.

== Alumni ==
- Paul Henry Carr, war hero
- Carrie Underwood
- Bobby Frame, state legislator in Oklahoma
- Tracy Scroggins, football player for the University of Tulsa and Detroit Lions
- Elijah Thomas wide receiver for the Oklahoma Sooners
- Jim Eddy, football coach
- Myrtle Frost, basketball player
- Mildred Hemphill-Burkhalter, educator, community leader, and mayor of Rentiesville, Oklahoma

== See also ==
- List of high schools in Oklahoma
