= Jim Eddy =

American football coach (1936–2016)

Personal information
- Born: May 2, 1936; McIntosh County, Oklahoma, U.S.
- Died: October 27, 2016 (aged 80); Checotah, Oklahoma, U.S.

Career information
- High school: Checotah (OK)
- College: New Mexico State

Career history

Coaching
- New Mexico State (1965–1970) Assistant head coach & defensive coordinator; UTEP (1971–1973) Defensive coordinator; Saskatchewan Roughriders (1974–1976) Defensive coordinator; Saskatchewan Roughriders (1977–1978) Head coach; Hamilton Tiger-Cats (1979–1980) Defensive coordinator; Montreal Alouettes (1981) Head coach; Houston Gamblers (1984–1985) Defensive coordinator; Houston (1987–1989) Defensive coordinator; Houston Oilers (1990–1992) Defensive coordinator; Dallas Cowboys (1993) Secondary and pass defense assistant; Dallas Cowboys (1994–1995) Linebackers coach; Detroit Lions (1996) Defensive coordinator

Operations
- Toronto Argonauts (1982–1983) General manager

Awards and highlights
- 2× Super Bowl champion (XXVIII, XXX); Grey Cup champion (1983)

Head coaching record
- Career: 10–17 (CFL); 12–24 (USFL)
- Coaching profile at Pro Football Reference

James Franklin Eddy (May 2, 1936 – October 27, 2016) was an American football coach in the National Football League (NFL) and Canadian Football League (CFL). He played college football at New Mexico State University.

== Early life ==
Eddy attended Checotah High School, where he played multiple sports. He played as a running back in football. He graduated at 16 years old, after skipping 2 grades early in his education.

He accepted a football scholarship from New Mexico State University, where he played defensive back and running back.

== Coaching career ==
Eddy's coaching career began as a high school coach in Odessa, Texas. He was later named head coach at Roswell High School. In 1968, he joined the coaching staff at his alma mater, New Mexico State University, where he was an assistant head coach and defensive coordinator.

In 1972, he joined Tommy Hudspeth's UTEP Miners coaching staff as the defensive coordinator.

Eddy's next coaching job was as the defensive coordinator of Saskatchewan Roughriders, which he held until he was promoted to head coach in 1977. In Eddy's first season, the Roughriders went 8–8 and missed the playoffs only one season removed from playing the Ottawa Rough Riders in the 64th Grey Cup. Eddy was fired during the 1978 season after the Riders lost their first five games.

In 1979, Eddy joined the Hamilton Tiger-Cats coaching staff, where he was reunited with his former boss in Saskatchewan, John Payne. His next coaching job was with the Montreal Alouettes, first as the defensive backfield coach, then as the Als interim head coach.

In 1982, he moved to the front office as Director of Operations and Player Personnel of the Toronto Argonauts. Along with head coach Bob O'Billovich, he helped rebuilt an Argonauts team that had gone 2–14 the prior season into a team that won the East Division championships in both of Eddy's seasons there and won the 71st Grey Cup in 1983.

Eddy was the defensive coordinator of the Houston Gamblers for both of the team's seasons in the United States Football League (USFL). He contributed to the team reaching the playoffs both years and winning a Division Title in 1984.

In 1987, Jack Pardee hired Eddy to become defensive coordinator of the Houston Cougars football team. He spent three seasons there, helping the school post a 22–11–1 record, while leading the Southwest Conference in defense in 1988 and 1989. In his final season, the defense finished sixth in the nation in scoring defense.

Eddy followed Pardee to the Houston Oilers, where he remained the coach's defensive coordinator in 1990. His defense led the American Football Conference, while finishing third in the league in total defense, third in the NFL in pass defense and tied for fifth in sacks. The Oilers earned three playoff berths, including the club's first AFC Central Division crown in 1991. He was fired following the Oilers 1992 playoff loss to the Buffalo Bills in an infamous game which would become known as The Comeback, when the team lost 38–41, after being in front 35–3, early in the third quarter.

He joined the Dallas Cowboys coaching staff in 1993 as a defensive assistant and later as the team's linebackers coach. While in Dallas, he helped win two Super Bowls. In 1996, Eddy became the Detroit Lions defensive coordinator. He would hold that job for only one season. He decided to retire in 1997. In 2000, he was one of the candidates for the vacant Cowboys head coaching position, but lost the job to Dave Campo.

== Personal life ==
On October 27, 2016, he died from complications of Alzheimer's disease at the age of 80.
