= Darryll Lewis =

American football player (born 1968)

No. 29, 26
- Position: Cornerback

Personal information
- Born: December 16, 1968 (age 57); Bellflower, California, U.S.
- Listed height: 5 ft 9 in (1.75 m)
- Listed weight: 188 lb (85 kg)

Career information
- High school: Nogales (La Puente, California)
- College: Arizona (1987–1990)
- NFL draft: 1991: 2nd round, 38th overall pick

Career history
- Houston / Tennessee Oilers (1991–1998); San Diego Chargers (1999–2000); Denver Broncos (2001)*
- * Offseason or practice squad member only

Awards and highlights
- Pro Bowl (1995); Jim Thorpe Award (1990); Unanimous All-American (1990); Pac-10 Co-Defensive Player of the Year (1990); First-team All-Pac-10 (1990); Second Team All-Pac 10 (1989); Arizona Wildcats Jersey No. 4 retired

Career NFL statistics
- Total tackles: 465
- Interceptions: 32
- Interception yards: 555
- Forced fumbles: 6
- Fumble recoveries: 8
- Sacks: 5
- Total touchdowns: 7
- Stats at Pro Football Reference

Darryll Lamont Lewis (born December 16, 1968) is an American former professional football player who was a cornerback in the National Football League (NFL). He played college football for the Arizona Wildcats, winning the Jim Thorpe Award as the top defensive back in the nation. He was selected by the Houston Oilers in the second round of the 1991 NFL draft.

== Early life ==
Lewis was born in Bellflower, California. He attended Nogales High School in La Puente, California.

== Professional career ==
Pre-draft measurables
Height	Weight	Arm length	Hand span	40-yard dash	10-yard split	20-yard split	20-yard shuttle	Vertical jump	Broad jump	Bench press
5 ft 8 1/2 in (1.74 m)	193 lb (88 kg)	30 in (0.76 m)	9 3/8 in (0.24 m)	4.63 s	1.56 s	2.63 s	4.13 s	32.5 in (0.83 m)	9 ft 10 in (3.00 m)	17 reps
All values from NFL Combine

He was selected by the Houston Oilers in the second round (38th overall) of the 1991 NFL draft. He was then traded to the San Diego Chargers in 1999 and again in 2000. He was named to the Pro Bowl in 1995 and was released by the Denver Broncos in 2001 after a 10-year career.

Lewis finished his career with 32 interceptions, which he returned for 555 yards and 5 touchdowns. He also recorded 5 sacks and 8 fumble recoveries, which he returned for 139 yards and one touchdown.

== Honors ==
He was inducted into the Arizona Sports Hall of Fame in 1995.

== After playing career ==
Lewis began a coaching career, and was hired in March 2003 to coach the Oregon State University defensive backs. He resigned two months later, with the school citing personal reasons.

In 2006, Darryll pleaded no contest to charges in two cases, and was sentenced to 32 months in prison by Supreme Court Judge Mark Nelson. The cases were related to felony counts of evading arrest and possession of methamphetamine, and misdemeanor charges of resisting arrest and taking a vehicle without the owner's consent.
