= Steve Jackson (defensive back) =

American football player and coach (born 1969)

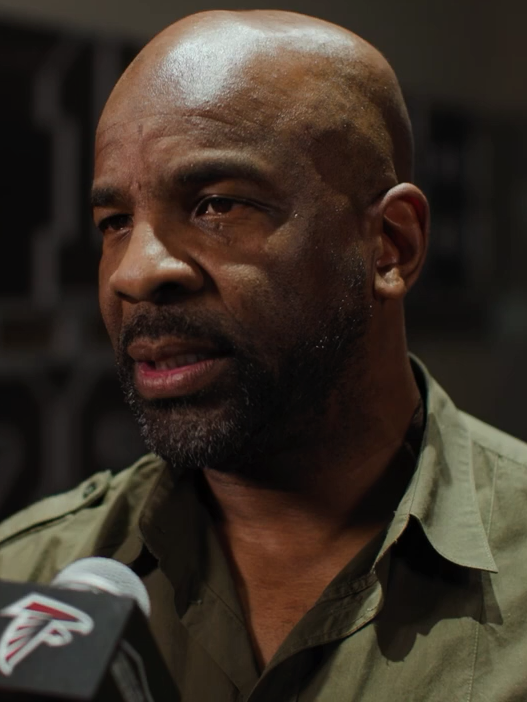
- Jackson in 2023

Profile
- Title: Secondary/safeties coach

Personal information
- Born: April 8, 1969 (age 57); Houston, Texas, U.S.
- Listed height: 5 ft 8 in (1.73 m)
- Listed weight: 188 lb (85 kg)

Career information
- Position: Defensive back (No. 24)
- High school: Klein Forest (Houston)
- College: Purdue
- NFL draft: 1991: 3rd round, 71st overall pick

Career history

Playing
- Houston / Tennessee Oilers / Titans (1991–1999)

Coaching
- Buffalo Bills (2001–2003) Assistant defensive backs coach (2001–2002) Defensive backs coach (2003); Washington Redskins (2004–2011) Safeties coach; Detroit Lions (2013) Assistant secondary coach; Tennessee Titans (2016–2017) Assistant defensive backs coach; New York Jets (2018–2019) Assistant defensive backs coach; Cincinnati Bengals (2020–2021) Secondary/cornerbacks coach; Atlanta Falcons (2022) Senior offensive assistant; Atlanta Falcons (2023) Secondary coach; Tennessee Titans (2024–2025) Secondary/safeties coach

Awards and highlights
- Gannett News Service All-American (1990); Second-team All-Big Ten (1990)

Career NFL statistics
- Sacks: 9
- Interceptions: 13
- Touchdowns: 1
- Stats at Pro Football Reference

Steven Wayne Jackson (born April 8, 1969) is an American professional football coach and former player who is the secondary & safeties coach for the Tennessee Titans of the National Football League (NFL). He played as a defensive back in the NFL for the Houston Oilers/Tennessee Titans.

Pre-draft measurables
Height	Weight	Arm length	Hand span	Bench press
5 ft 8 1/4 in (1.73 m)	182 lb (83 kg)	29 in (0.74 m)	9 1/4 in (0.23 m)	18 reps
All values from NFL Combine

Jackson was selected by Houston in the third round (71st overall) in the 1991 NFL draft. In 1999, the Titans made it to Super Bowl XXXIV in which Jackson appeared as a substitute; however, they lost to the Kurt Warner-led St. Louis Rams. In 2022, twenty-two years later, Jackson coached the Cincinnati Bengals secondary/cornerbacks in Super Bowl LVI, also losing to Los Angeles Rams.

== Coaching career ==
Steve Jackson entered his 20th season as an NFL coach in 2023 and first season as secondary coach for the Atlanta Falcons, after spending the 2022 season as a senior offensive assistant.

In 2022, the Atlanta offense led the NFL in fewest penalties, finished third in the NFL in rushing yards per game and 10th in third-down conversion rate. Atlanta also had the third-highest successful play rate on rushing attempts, based on EPA, at 45.1 percent.

Jackson came to Atlanta with 18 years of NFL coaching experience, having served as the secondary/cornerbacks coach for the Cincinnati Bengals (2020–2021).

Cincinnati's defensive backs limited opposing quarterbacks to a 60.8 completion percentage, eight touchdowns and eight interceptions resulting in a 74.9 passer rating over a four-game run in the 2021 postseason, en route to an appearance in Super Bowl LVI.

Previously, Jackson spent two seasons (2018–19) with the New York Jets, where he served as the team's assistant defensive backs coach. During his two seasons coaching the Jets DBs, he helped guide S Jamal Adams to consecutive Pro Bowl appearances and first-team AP All-Pro nods. Adams also led the Jets in tackles in both seasons, and was voted by his teammates both years as the Curtis Martin Team Most Valuable Player.

Prior to his time with the Jets, Jackson spent two seasons (2016–17) with the Tennessee Titans as the team's assistant secondary coach. In 2017, he helped guide S Kevin Byard, a third-round selection in ’16, to a standout season that included eight INTs (tied for NFL lead), a Pro Bowl nod and first-team All-Pro honors. Additionally, Jackson aided in the development of CB Adoree’ Jackson, Tennessee's first-round selection in 2017, who was thrust into immediate action as a full-time starter and ended his rookie season with a team-high 17 passes defensed and three FFs (tied for team lead).

Jackson served as assistant secondary coach for one season (2013) with the Detroit Lions, after spending eight years (’04-11) with the Washington Redskins as safeties coach (also added the title of defensive passing game coordinator from ’06-09). His time in Washington was perhaps best known for his work as the position coach for the late Sean Taylor, a 2004 Redskins first-round pick who became one of the NFL's top defensive players before dying tragically in ’07. Jackson was safeties coach for all four of Taylor's NFL seasons, overseeing a rapid development that earned Taylor first-team AP All-Pro and Pro Bowl honors before his untimely death at age 24.

Jackson began his NFL coaching career from 2001 to 2003 with the Buffalo Bills, where he served as safeties coach, with an added focus on the team's third- down defense.

Prior to his coaching career, Jackson played safety in the NFL for nine seasons (1991–99), all of which were with the Houston Oilers/Tennessee Titans. He entered the league as a third-round draft choice of the Oilers in 1991, and went on to post 14 career INTs and nine sacks. In his final season, he helped the Titans to an AFC Championship and concluded his career in Super Bowl XXXIV.

Before the NFL, Jackson was a four-year starter at Purdue University. As a senior, he earned All-American honors and was named semifinalist for the Jim Thorpe Award, given annually to the nation's top defensive back.

Jackson was born April 8, 1969, in Houston, Texas, and went on to attend Klein Forest High School in Houston. He has a daughter, Dominique, and a son, Stephen.
