= Pelham =

Pelham may refer to:

== People ==
- Pelham (name), including a list of people with the name

== Places ==
=== In Australia ===
- Pelham, Queensland, a locality in the Western Downs Region
- Pelham, Tasmania, a rural locality

=== In Canada ===
- Pelham, Ontario
- Pelham Range, on Vancouver Island, British Columbia

=== In the United Kingdom ===
- Pelham, Birmingham, a suburb in Birmingham
- Brent Pelham a village in Hertfordshire, England, one of the three Pelham villages, along with the nearby Stocking Pelham and Furneux Pelham
- Pelham Arcade, Grade II* listed building in East Sussex

=== In the United States ===
==== In New York ====
- Pelham, New York, a town in Westchester County
  - Pelham (Metro-North station), a train station in the above town
  - Pelham (village), New York, a village within the above town
    - North Pelham, New York, former village within the above town, and now neighborhood within Village of Pelham
  - Pelham Manor, New York, a village within the above town
- IRT Pelham Line, NYC subway line
- Pelham Bay (disambiguation)
- Pelham Gardens, Bronx, a neighborhood
- Pelham Parkway, Bronx, a neighborhood

==== Elsewhere ====
- Pelham, Alabama
- Pelham, Georgia
- Pelham, Massachusetts
- Pelham, New Hampshire
- Pelham, North Carolina
- Pelham, Tennessee
- Pelham, Pietermaritzburg, South Africa

== Arts, entertainment, and media ==
- Pelham (novel), an 1828 novel by Edward Bulwer-Lytton, 1st Baron Lytton
- The Taking of Pelham One Two Three (disambiguation), a novel by Morton Freedgood, and its three film adaptations

== Other uses ==
- Pelham, a type face in the Times New Roman family
- Pelham bit, a type of curb bit used while riding horses
- Pelham Puppets, an English toy-making company
