= Pelham, New York (disambiguation) =

Pelham, New York is the name of two locations in Westchester County, New York:

- Pelham (town), New York, the Town of Pelham
- Pelham Manor (village), New York, the Village of Pelham Manor
- Pelham (village), New York, the Village of Pelham
