= Pelham, New York =

Pelham
- Town
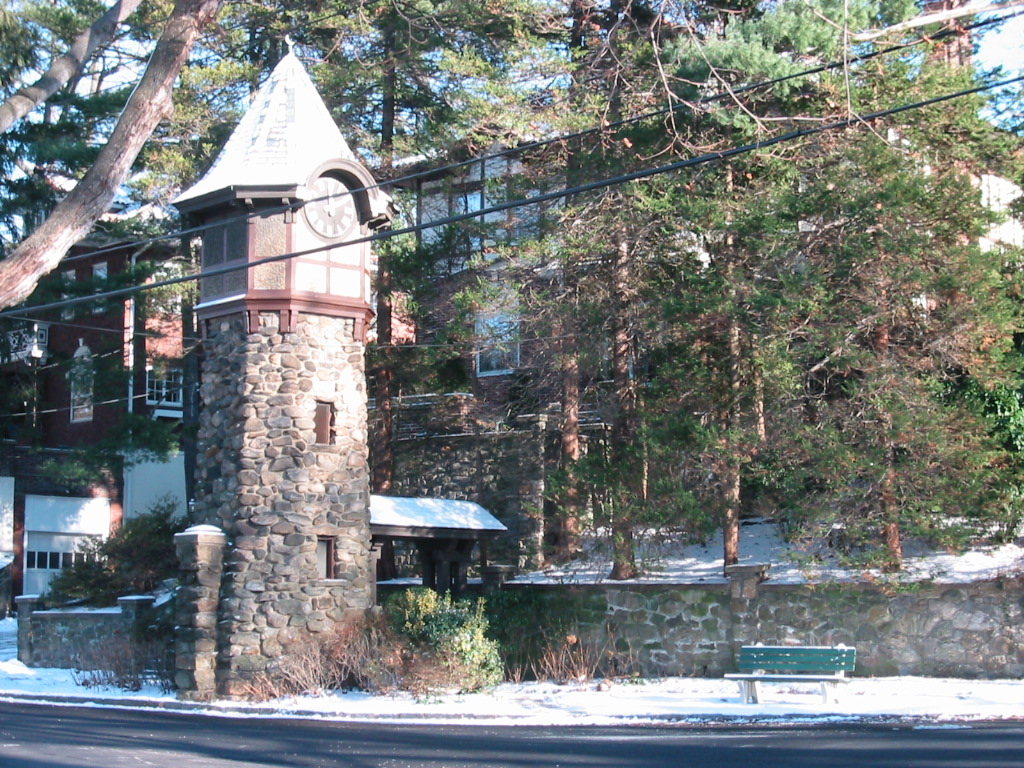
- Clock tower on Harmon

- Seal

- Location of Pelham, New York
- Coordinates: 40°54′38″N 73°48′27″W
- Country: United States
- State: New York
- County: Westchester
- Incorporated: 1788

Government
  - Town Supervisor: Theresa Mohan
  - Deputy Town Supervisor: Maura Curtin

Area
  - Total: 2.22 sq mi (5.74 km^{2})
  - Land: 2.17 sq mi (5.63 km^{2})
  - Water: 0.046 sq mi (0.12 km^{2}) 2.27%
- Elevation: 63.1 ft (19.2 m)

Population (2020)
  - Total: 13,078
  - Density: 6,020/sq mi (2,320/km^{2})
- Time zone: Eastern
- ZIP code: 10803
- Area code: 914
- FIPS code: 36-119-57012
- Website: https://townofpelhamny.gov/

Pelham /pɛləm/ is a suburban town in Westchester County, approximately 10 miles northeast of Midtown Manhattan. As of the 2020 census, it had a population of 13,079, an increase from the 2010 census. Historically, Pelham was composed of five villages and became known as "the Pelhams". Pelham currently contains two independently incorporated villages: the Villages of Pelham and Pelham Manor.

Approximately 35 minutes away from Grand Central Terminal by the Metro-North Railroad's New Haven Line, Pelham is home to many New York City commuters and has an active social community for its residents. The Bronx–Whitestone Bridge is approximately 8.5 miles (13.7 km) south of the town. It is also 13 miles (21 km) northeast of LaGuardia Airport and 19.5 miles (31.4 km) north of John F. Kennedy International Airport.

== Geography ==
According to the United States Census Bureau, the town has a total area of 2.4 square miles (6.2 km^{2}). It is directly north of the Bronx, a New York City borough, and borders Eastchester, New Rochelle, and Mount Vernon.

== History ==
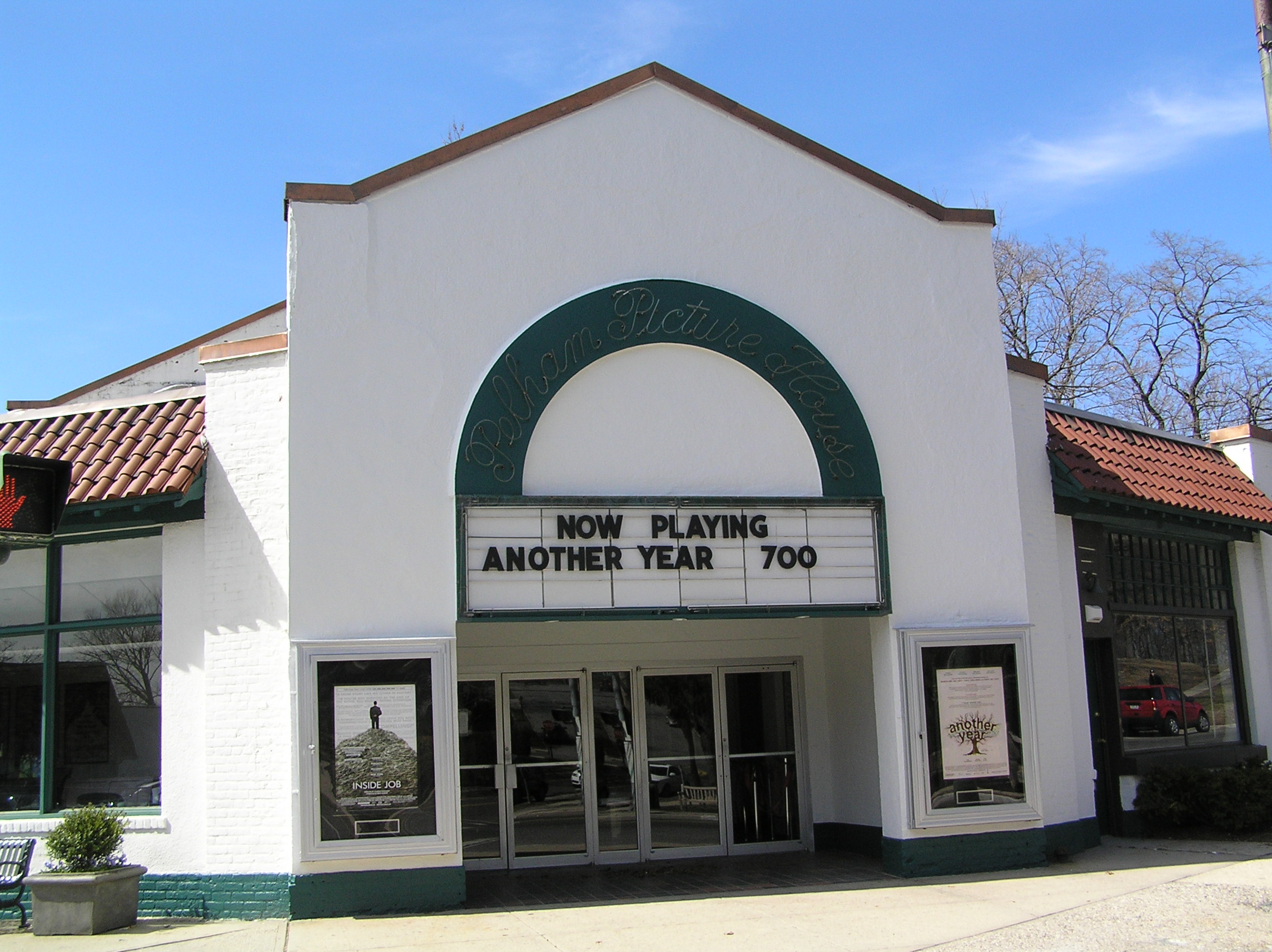
The historic Pelham Picture House

In 1654, Thomas Pell bought the area within the present-day town from the Siwanoy Indians, establishing the vast Manor of Pelham. The Census of slaves, conducted in the Province of New York in 1755, listed 24 enslaved individuals in Pelham Manor.

The Town of Pelham was part of Westchester County when it was established by the post-Revolution New York State legislature in 1788. It included all of City Island and present-day Pelham Bay Park east of the Hutchinson River. In 1889, the town was incorporated at its current boundaries. In 1891, the village of Pelham Manor incorporated. In 1896, the village of North Pelham and the village of Pelham incorporated. In 1975, the villages of North Pelham and Pelham merged, forming the present village of Pelham.

The Village of Pelham and the Village of Pelham Manor share several services such as school and recreational activities. There is a grassroots movement to continue the consolidation of services in order to reduce taxes. Given the differences in debt levels, tax rates, population and tax base such a consolidation has been opposed by many Pelham Manor residents. Such a merger is unlikely under current conditions.

For many years after 1916, Pelham was the headquarters of the Sanborn Map Company, which produced Sanborn maps.

The Pelham Picture House was added to the National Register of Historic Places in 2010.

The book, The Haunted History of Pelham, New York, documents the history of Pelham and the region, including ghost stories.

== Demographics ==
Historical population
Census	Pop.	Note	%±
1790	199		—
1820	283		—
1830	334		18.0%
1840	789		136.2%
1850	577		−26.9%
1860	1,025		77.6%
1870	1,790		74.6%
1880	2,540		41.9%
1890	3,941		55.2%
1900	1,571		−60.1%
1910	2,998		90.8%
1920	5,195		73.3%
1930	11,851		128.1%
1940	12,272		3.6%
1950	12,195		−0.6%
1960	13,404		9.9%
1970	13,933		3.9%
1980	12,978		−6.9%
1990	11,903		−8.3%
2000	11,866		−0.3%
2010	12,396		4.5%
2020	13,078		5.5%
U.S. Decennial Census

As of the census of 2000, there were 12,107 people, 4,149 households and 3,190 families residing in the town. The population density was 5,523.4 people per square mile (2,132.6 people/km^{2}). There were 4,246 housing units at an average density of 1,976.4 per square mile (763.1/km^{2}).

The racial makeup of the town was 87.33% White, 4.57% Black or African American, 0.08% Native American, 3.96% Asian, 1.82% from other races and 2.23% from two or more races. Hispanic or Latino people of any race were 6.02% of the population.

There were 4,149 households, out of which 41.3% had children under the age of 18 living with them, 64.4% were married couples living together, 9.7% had a female householder with no husband present and 23.1% were non-families. 19.4% of all households were made up of individuals, and 8.3% had someone living alone who was 65 years of age or older. The average household size was 2.86 and the average family size was 3.31.

In the town, the population was spread out, with 28.6% under the age of 18, 5.1% from 18 to 24, 28.3% from 25 to 44, 25.1% from 45 to 64 and 12.9% who were 65 years of age or older. The median age was 38 years. For every 100 females, there were 93.4 males.

For every 100 females age 18 and over, there were 86.9 males.

The median income for a household in the town was $91,810 and the median income for a family was $112,339. Males had a median income of $74,760 versus $46,086 for females. The per capita income for the town was $51,548. About 2.2% of families and 3.7% of the population were below the poverty line, including 4.3% of those under age 18 and 3.2% of those age 65 or over.

== Economy ==
Major employers in Pelham include Pico Electronics, Barksdale Home Care Services Corp., Pelham Public Schools and programs ran through it, the New York Athletic Club, The Pelham Country Club and the De Cicco & Sons grocery. Other companies based in Pelham include Archie Comics.

== Climate ==
Climate data for Pelham, NY
Month	Jan	Feb	Mar	Apr	May	Jun	Jul	Aug	Sep	Oct	Nov	Dec	Year
Record high °F (°C)	73 (23)	75 (24)	86 (30)	96 (36)	97 (36)	99 (37)	104 (40)	102 (39)	101 (38)	89 (32)	82 (28)	77 (25)	104 (40)
Mean daily maximum °F (°C)	39.2 (4.0)	42.9 (6.1)	51.4 (10.8)	62.6 (17.0)	73.8 (23.2)	81.6 (27.6)	86.0 (30.0)	83.9 (28.8)	76.1 (24.5)	65.4 (18.6)	55.1 (12.8)	43.8 (6.6)	63.5 (17.5)
Mean daily minimum °F (°C)	20.1 (−6.6)	22.3 (−5.4)	29.1 (−1.6)	38.4 (3.6)	47.2 (8.4)	56.8 (13.8)	62.3 (16.8)	60.8 (16.0)	53.0 (11.7)	41.2 (5.1)	34.6 (1.4)	25.6 (−3.6)	41.0 (5.0)
Record low °F (°C)	−10 (−23)	−5 (−21)	2 (−17)	17 (−8)	29 (−2)	38 (3)	49 (9)	44 (7)	34 (1)	27 (−3)	12 (−11)	−4 (−20)	−10 (−23)
Average precipitation inches (mm)	3.56 (90)	2.84 (72)	4.07 (103)	4.16 (106)	4.33 (110)	3.44 (87)	4.20 (107)	3.93 (100)	4.37 (111)	3.67 (93)	4.09 (104)	3.80 (97)	46.46 (1,180)
Average snowfall inches (cm)	9.8 (25)	10.9 (28)	6.8 (17)	1.4 (3.6)	.2 (0.51)	0 (0)	0 (0)	0 (0)	0 (0)	.1 (0.25)	.8 (2.0)	8.6 (22)	38.6 (98)
Average rainy days (≥ 0.01 in)	8.5	8.1	9.3	9.8	10.9	9.3	9.0	8.7	7.6	6.7	9.2	9.4	113.4
Source 1: Weatherbase
Source 2: Homefacts (precipitation only) The Weather Channel (extremes)

== Education ==
Pelham Town is within the Pelham Union Free School District.

Pelham is home to four elementary schools (two located in each village), one middle school, and one high school, the last two are attached. The elementary schools are Hutchinson, Colonial, Siwanoy, and Prospect Hill. Pelham Middle School and Pelham Memorial High School gather students for all of Pelham. These are all part of the Pelham Union Free School District. There are also several private and religious based schools. Since 1948 (and as of 1997), New York City has paid the district to educate children who live in Bronx Manor, as doing so is less expensive than sending school buses there.

== Fire department ==
The Village of Pelham Fire Department has 10 firefighters and five lieutenants, using one fire station. The fleet has two engines, one ladder, one utility unit, and a command vehicle. The Pelham Fire Department responds to approximately 800 emergency calls annually.

== Religion ==
=== St. Catharine's Catholic Church ===
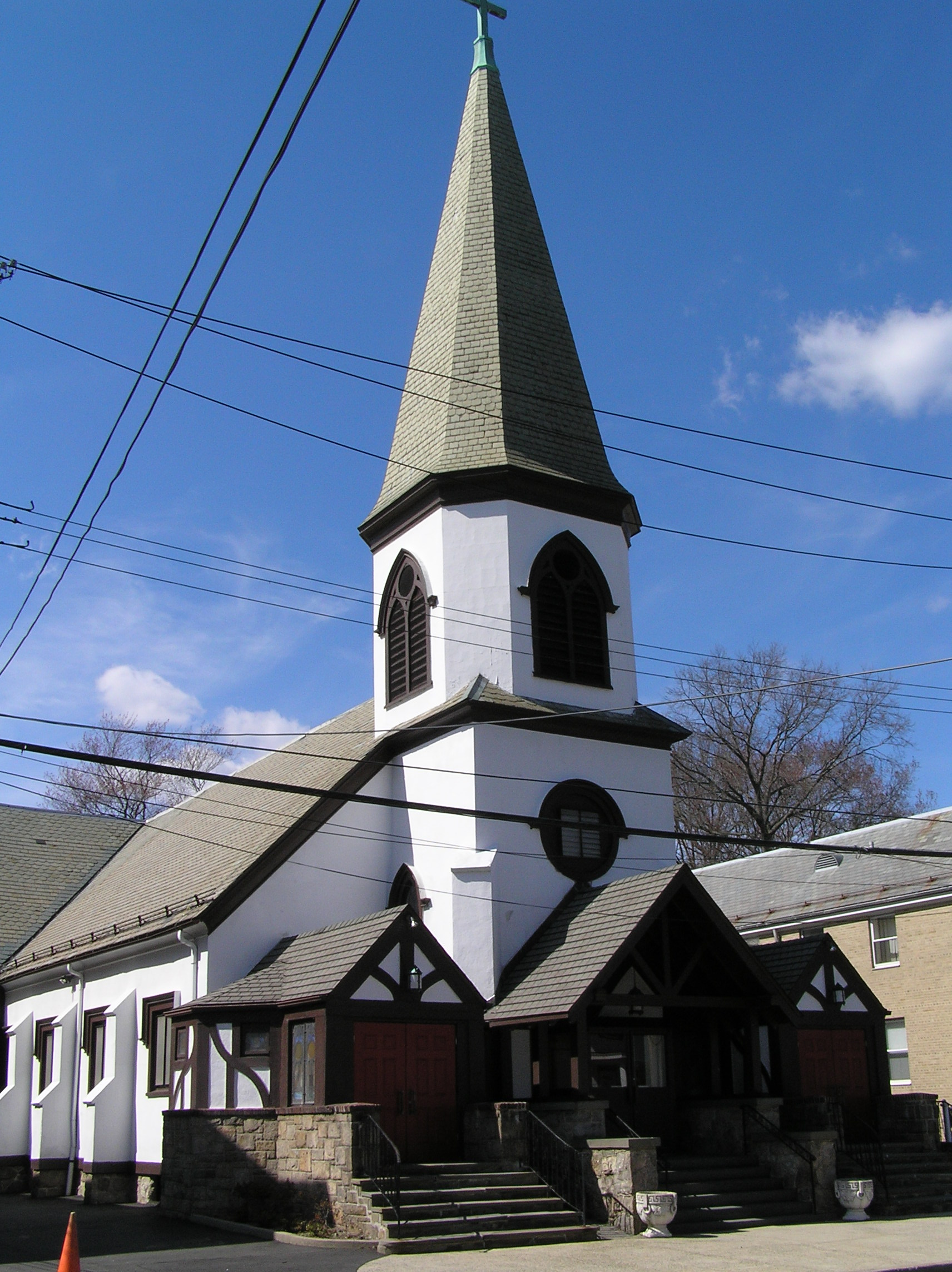
Saint Catherine's Church

St. Catharine's was originally a mission church of St Gabriel's parish in New Rochelle. In July 1896 a frame church was built in the newly incorporated village of Pelham on land donated by Mr. and Mrs. Patrick Farrell. In December 1897 St. Catharine's became a separate parish with Rev. Francis P. McNichol as first pastor. A school was established in 1904, staffed by the Sisters of St. Francis. At the end of the school year in 1983 St. Catharine's School closed bringing to an end 75 years of Catholic education in the parish. The school building was converted to a Parish Center to provide space for Religious Education classes, parish activities and groups to meet. A new church was dedicated in 1909.

In 1936 W. T. Grant, who owned a chain of five-and-ten cent stores, gave property in Pelham Manor to St. Catharine's to serve as a separate “mission”. The mission evolved to become Our Lady of Perpetual Help parish, with its own church building. In 2014 it was announced that the two parishes would merge, with the newer, larger Our Lady of Perpetual Help building designated as the parish church. However, St. Catharine's Church in the Village of Pelham was retained as a worship center.

== Transportation ==
The Bee-Line Bus System provides bus service to Pelham.

On Amtrak, Pelham is located closest to the New Rochelle station ("NRO") on the Northeast Corridor. On Metro-North Railroad, the Pelham station is within Fare Zone 12 on the New Haven Line. Pelham is also about 28 minutes from Grand Central Terminal.

== Notable people ==
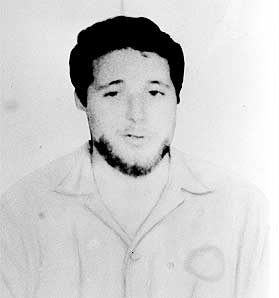
Michael Schwerner, murdered by the KKK

- Nancy Allen, New York Philharmonic harpist
- Liborio Bellomo, boss of the Genovese crime family
- Alessandra Biaggi (born 1986), New York State Senator
- Nick Bollettieri (1931-2022), tennis coach
- Charles Lewis Bowman, architect, designed nine homes
- Felix Cavaliere (born 1942), musician- founder of The Young Rascals
- Antonio Ciacca, jazz pianist, composer and conductor
- Joseph Cross, Hollywood actor, starred in films such as Jack Frost, Milk, and Lincoln
- Tony DeMeo, retired college football coach, author, and motivational speaker
- Kate Douglass, 2020 and 2024 Olympic swimmer, 5-time Olympic medallist
- Brett Gardner (born 1983), Major League Baseball player
- C. P. H. Gilbert, architect best known for designing townhouses and mansions, retired in Pelham Manor at his home on 216 Townsend Avenue
- Herman 'Jackrabbit' Smith-Johannsen (1875-1987), Norwegian credited for introducing cross-country skiing to North America
- Mary Lorson, musician
- Richard Rood (born 1955), Grammy Award-winning violinist
- Clinton Roosevelt (1804–1898), politician and inventor
- Ethel Schwabacher (1903—1984), abstract expressionist painter
- Michael Schwerner (1939-1964), civil rights worker murdered by the Ku Klux Klan while helping African-Americans register to vote in Mississippi
- Gary Scott (born 1968), Major League Baseball player
- Gene Stone (born 1951), writer and editor
- James M. Stone, Founder, Chairman, and CEO, Plymouth Rock Assurance
- Mae Woughter Strack (died 1941), nurse and artist
- Dame Nita Barrow, Ambassador to the United Nations for Barbados

== Image gallery ==
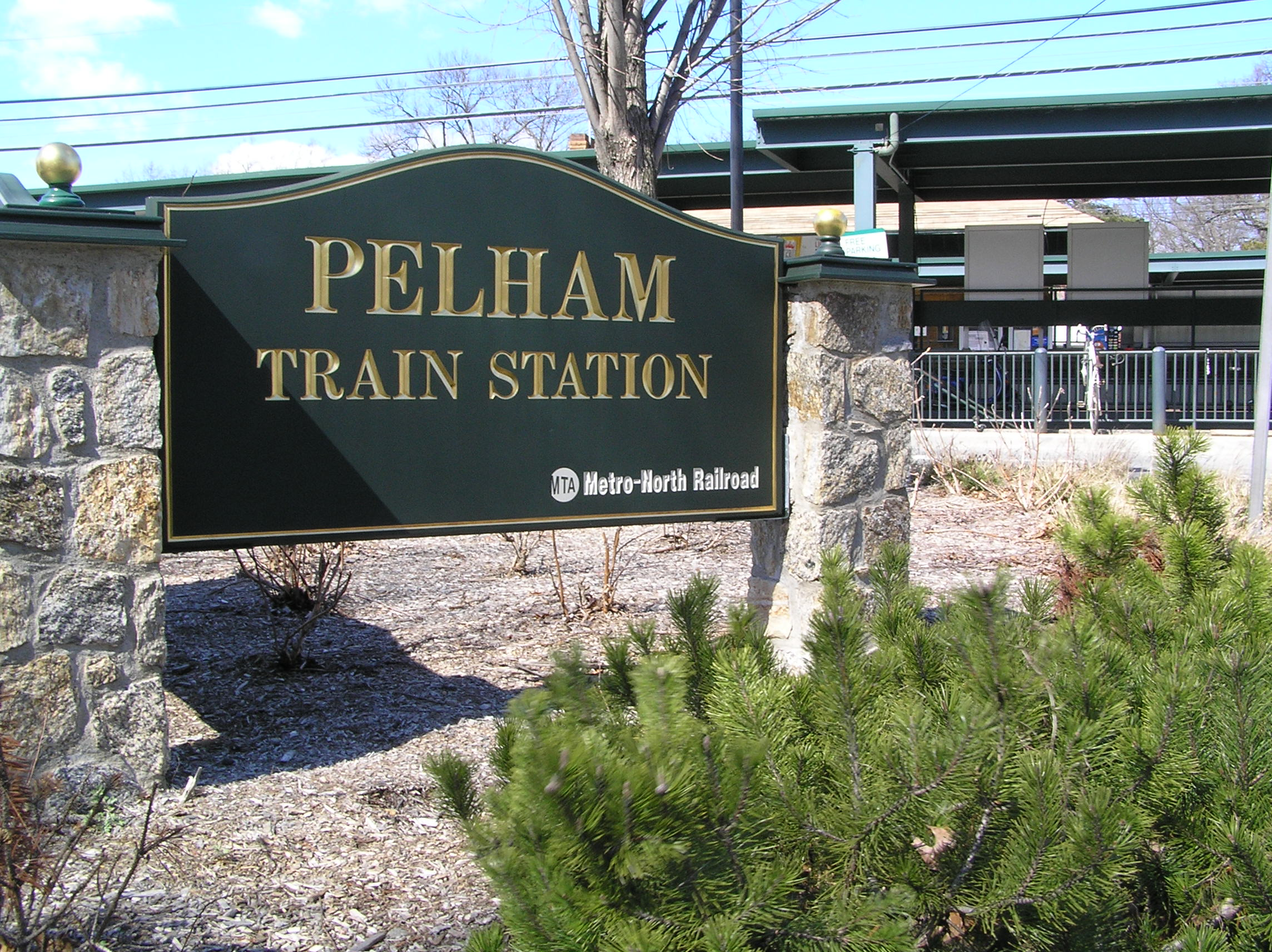
Pelham Train Station, also in the village

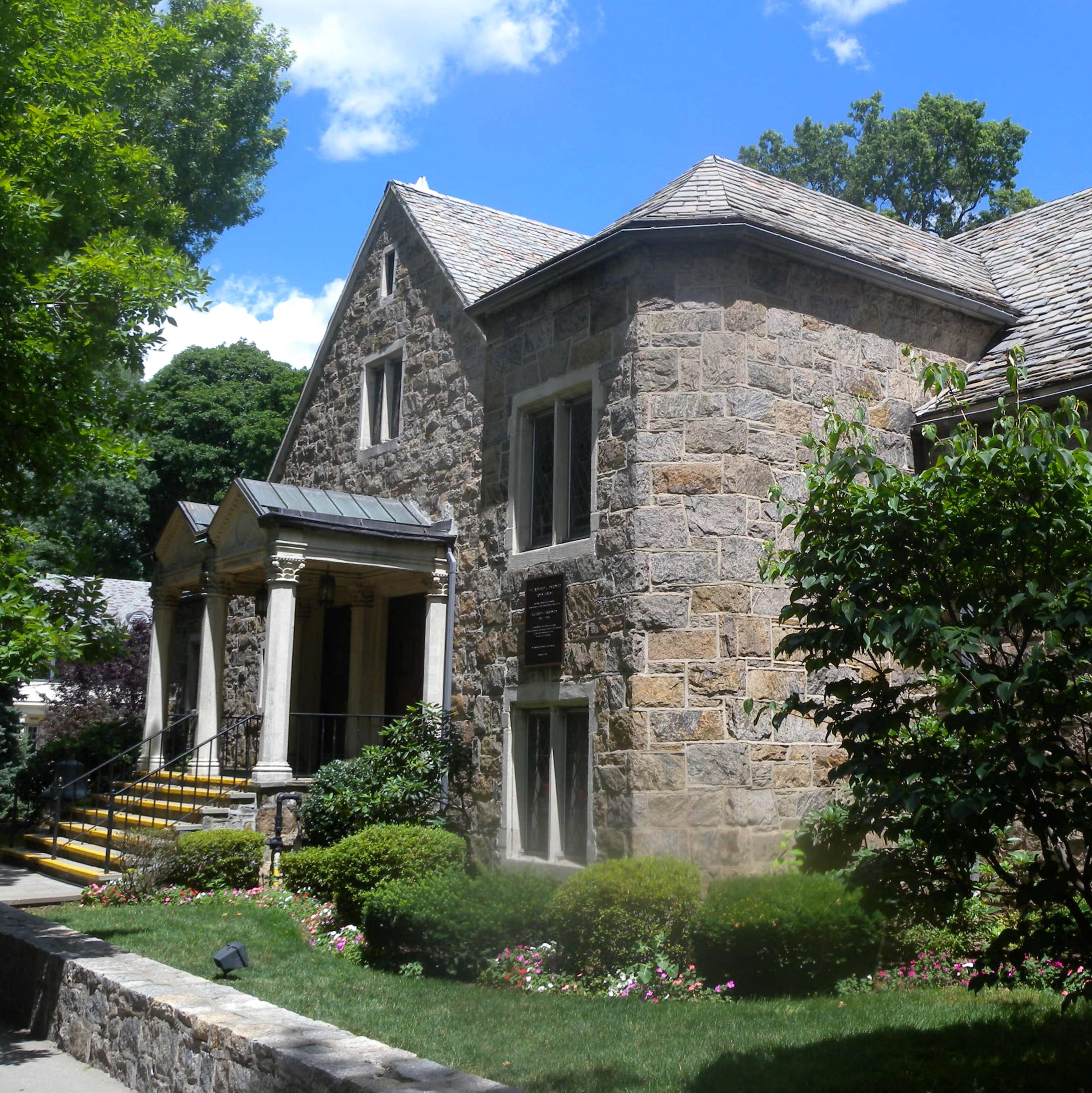
Daronco Town House

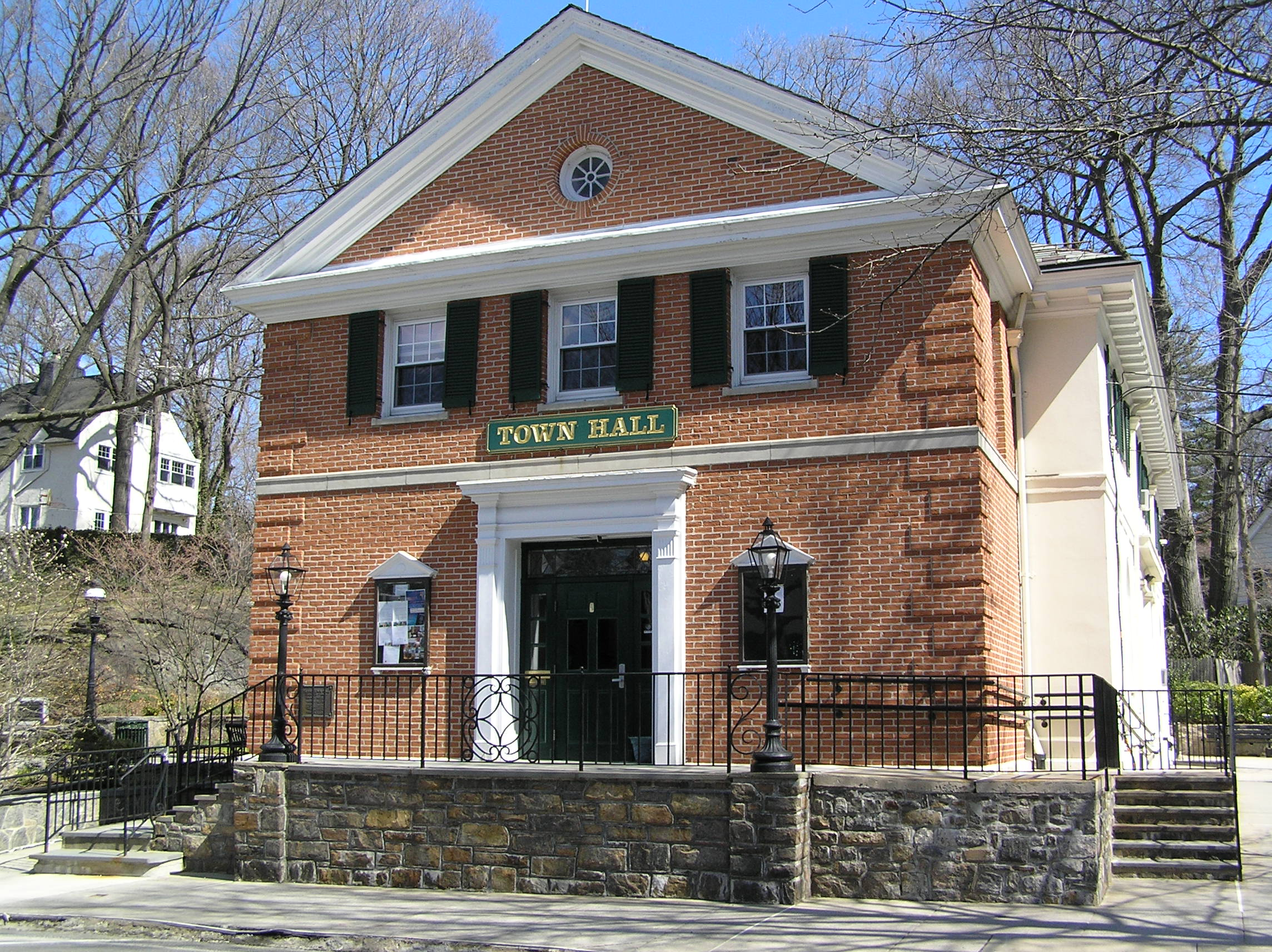
Pelham Town Hall
