= Pelhamdale =

Historic house in New York, United States

- U.S. National Register of Historic Places
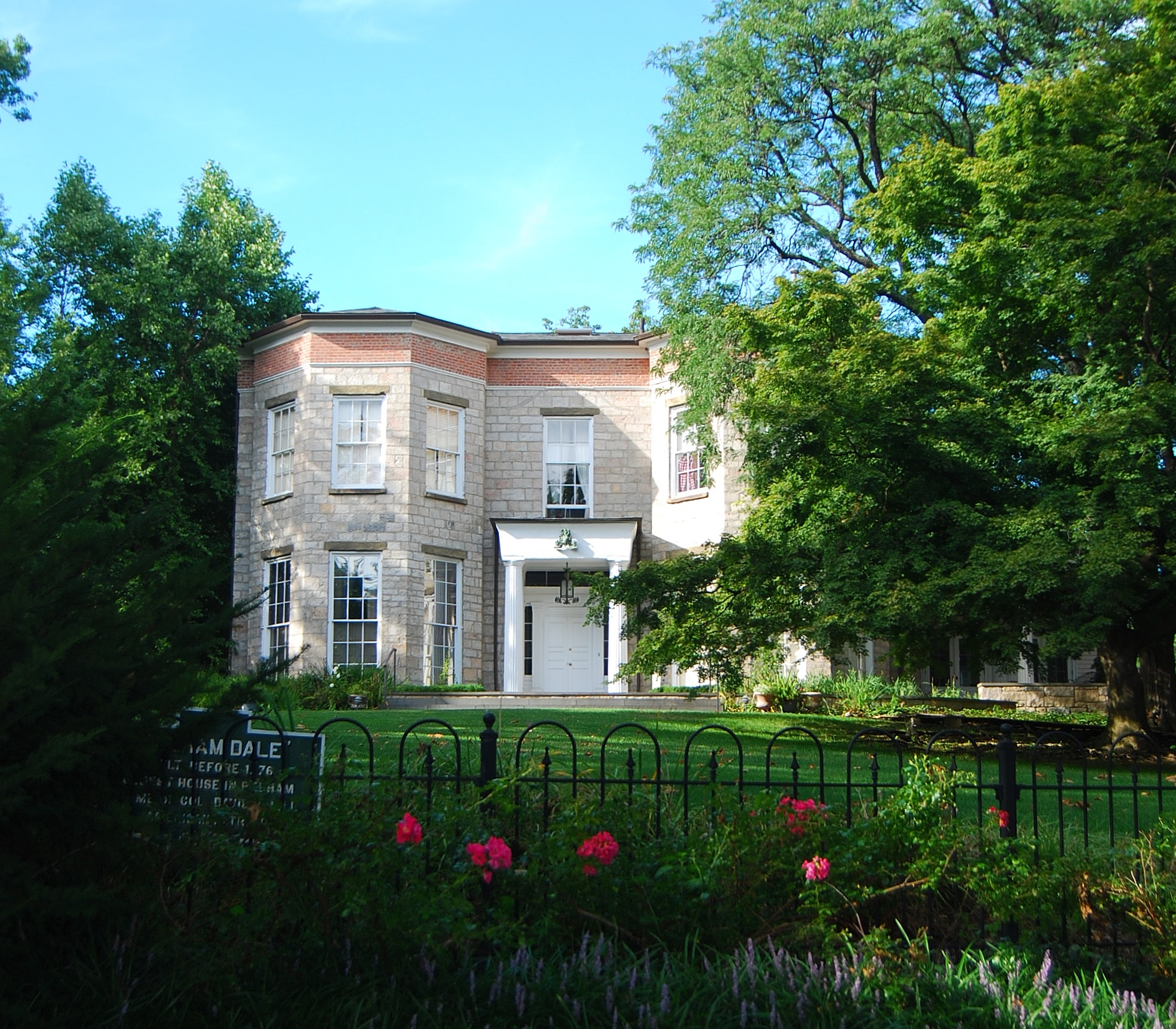
- Pelhamdale - The old stone house. September 2014

- Location within New York Location within the United States
- Location: 45 Iden Ave., Pelham Manor, New York
- Coordinates: 40°54′3″N 73°48′55″W
- Area: 0.8 acres (0.32 ha)
- Built: ca. 1750
- NRHP reference No.: 82001276
- Added to NRHP: November 4, 1982

Pelhamdale, also known as The Old Stone House of Philip Pell II, is a historic home located in Pelham Manor, Westchester County, New York. It was built about 1750 as a single-story dwelling and expanded after 1823. It is a two-story, stone residence faced in coursed, rock-faced stone ranging in color from muted orange and red, to gray. It has white native sandstone Doric order columns on the front porch, lintels and sills, and a plain brick entablature. It features two bays flanking the main entrance, each with three double-hung windows on each floor. Philip Pell II was a grandson of Thomas Pell (1608–1669).

It was added to the National Register of Historic Places in 1982.

== See also ==
- National Register of Historic Places listings in southern Westchester County, New York
