= Pelham station =

Railroad station in Pelham, New York, US

Pelham
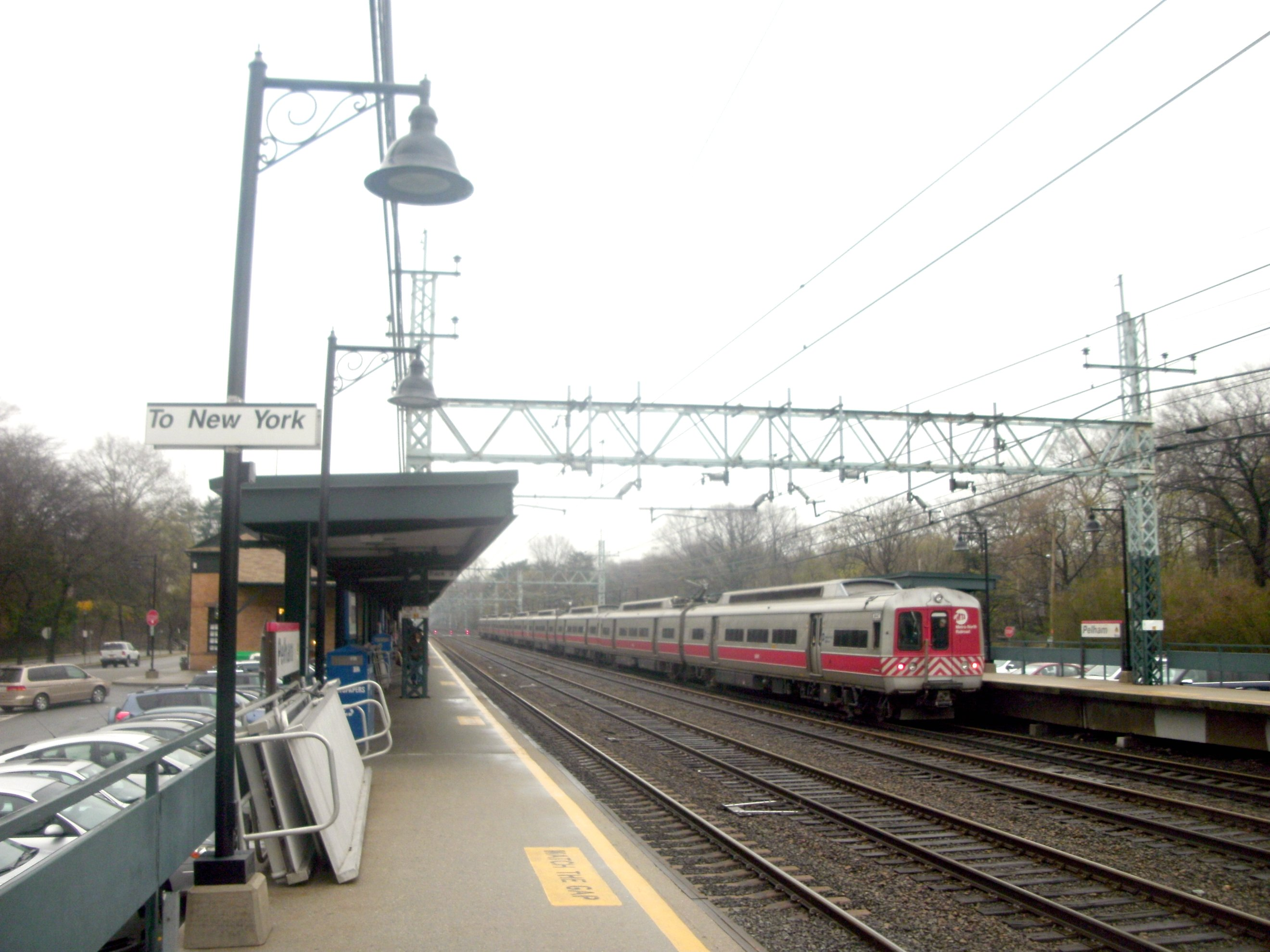
- A train departing Pelham station in April 2011

General information
- Location: 1 Pelhamwood Avenue; Pelham, New York
- Coordinates: 40.91003°N 73.80891°W
- Owner: Metropolitan Transportation Authority
- Line: New Haven Line
- Platforms: 2 side platforms
- Tracks: 4
- Connections: Bee-Line Bus System: 53

Construction
- Parking: 343 spaces
- Cycle facilities: Yes
- Accessible: yes

Other information
- Fare zone: 12

History
- Opened: 1851
- Rebuilt: 1895
- Electrified: 1907
- Former names: Pelhamville

Passengers
- 2018: 3,163 daily boardings

Services
Preceding station	Metro-North Railroad	Following station
Mount Vernon East toward Grand Central	New Haven Line	New Rochelle toward Stamford
Former services
Preceding station	New York, New Haven and Hartford Railroad	Following station
Columbus Avenue toward New York	Main Line	New Rochelle toward New Haven
Location

Pelham station is a commuter rail station on the Metro-North Railroad's New Haven Line, located in Pelham, New York. When the station opened in 1851, it was called Pelhamville and located on the west side of Fifth Avenue/Wolfs Lane. The station was renamed as Pelham in 1896, shortly after a new station was constructed on the east side of Fifth Avenue/Wolfs Lane. It is the southernmost station on the line before it changes from overhead catenary power to third rail power, which takes place between the Pelham and Mount Vernon East stations.

== History ==
=== First station at Pelhamville ===
When the development of Pelhamville was laid out in 1851, a two-story depot was constructed at the southwest corner of Fifth Avenue and First Street and given to the New York, New Haven, and Hartford Railroad (NYNH&H) on the condition that trains stop at the station. Proposals for the construction of the new depot were solicited in April 1851.

Pelhamville was a flag stop until regular train service began in 1873, when the NYNH&H placed an agent at the station to sell tickets. The first station agent was Charles Merritt, who held the position until 1895. (Note: Merritt also served as Pelhamville's postmaster, an agent of the Adams Express Company, and as a telegraph operator for Western Union.) A post office was established at the station in 1878.

On the morning of December 27, 1885, a southbound express mail train from Boston derailed near Pelhamville station, killing one person and seriously injuring three others. The train was traveling at 40 miles per hour (64 km/h) when it struck the station's 6-by-100-foot (1.8 by 30.5 m) wooden platform, which had been blown onto the tracks by heavy winds and caused the train's engine, tender, and mail car to roll down the 60-foot-high (18 m) embankment located to the west of the station. (Note: A stone arch bridge was later constructed through part of this embankment to allow the Hutchinson River Parkway to cross under the railroad tracks.)

=== Relocation and renaming of station ===
In 1887, local residents wanted to move the station's location. A 400-by-75-foot (122 by 23 m) plot of land, located to the east of Fifth Avenue/Wolfs Lane and on the north side of the railroad tracks, was donated by Colonel Richard Lathers to the NYNH&H for a new station with the understanding that the land be kept in good condition and the name of the station be changed to "Winyah Park". (Note: Colonel Lathers owned a nearby estate in New Rochelle called "Winyah Park" and the tract of land on the north side of the proposed station was also known as the same name.)

In the mid-1890s, grade separated crossings were added by the NYNH&H when the railroad line was expanded from two to four tracks. A 40-foot-long (12 m), five-centered arch was constructed in 1894 to carry the railroad over Highbrook Avenue. A bridge for the railroad crossing at Fifth Avenue/Wolfs Lane was also added by 1895; this underpass was later widened in 1908 by shifting the location of its eastern abutment. Local residents had previously petitioned the NYNH&H to install an underpass at Fifth Avenue/Wolfs Lane, as both sides of the crossing had steep grades and oncoming trains were not visible until those using the road had reached the top of the embankment. (Note: The petition called for a crossing at Pelhamdale Avenue but was referring to the current crossing location at Wolfs Lane. In the 1880s, Pelhamdale Avenue followed a different route and cut through the area now occupied by the Pelham Memorial High School, merging into Wolfs Lane near the current location of the Pelham Picture House. The routing of Pelhamdale Avenue was later changed to intersect with the current location of the train station.)

A fire occurred in the old train station in January 1895, which was put out before the flames reached the first floor. Some of the residents were disappointed that the station didn't burn down because they considered the old frame building to be an eyesore and wanted a new train station to be constructed. Another fire later struck the old station house in December 1895. While this fire gutted the building, it was thought that repairs would not be made because it would be replaced by a new station.

Construction of the new station at its present location began on June 28, 1895. The 80-by-40-foot (24 by 12 m) building was designed using brick, stone and tile in a similar appearance to the NYNH&H stations at Mount Vernon, Harrison and Rye. (Note: The original NYNH&H Mount Vernon station was located between 3rd and Park avenues, slightly west of the current Metro-North Mount Vernon East station.) By the end of July, foundation walls for the new station were completed and fences had been placed between the tracks. On August 3, 1895—while the new station was under construction—station agent Charles Merritt was killed in an accident and his wife took over his positions with the NYNH&H and the Adams Express Company. By mid-August, work on the new station was reported as rapidly progressing.

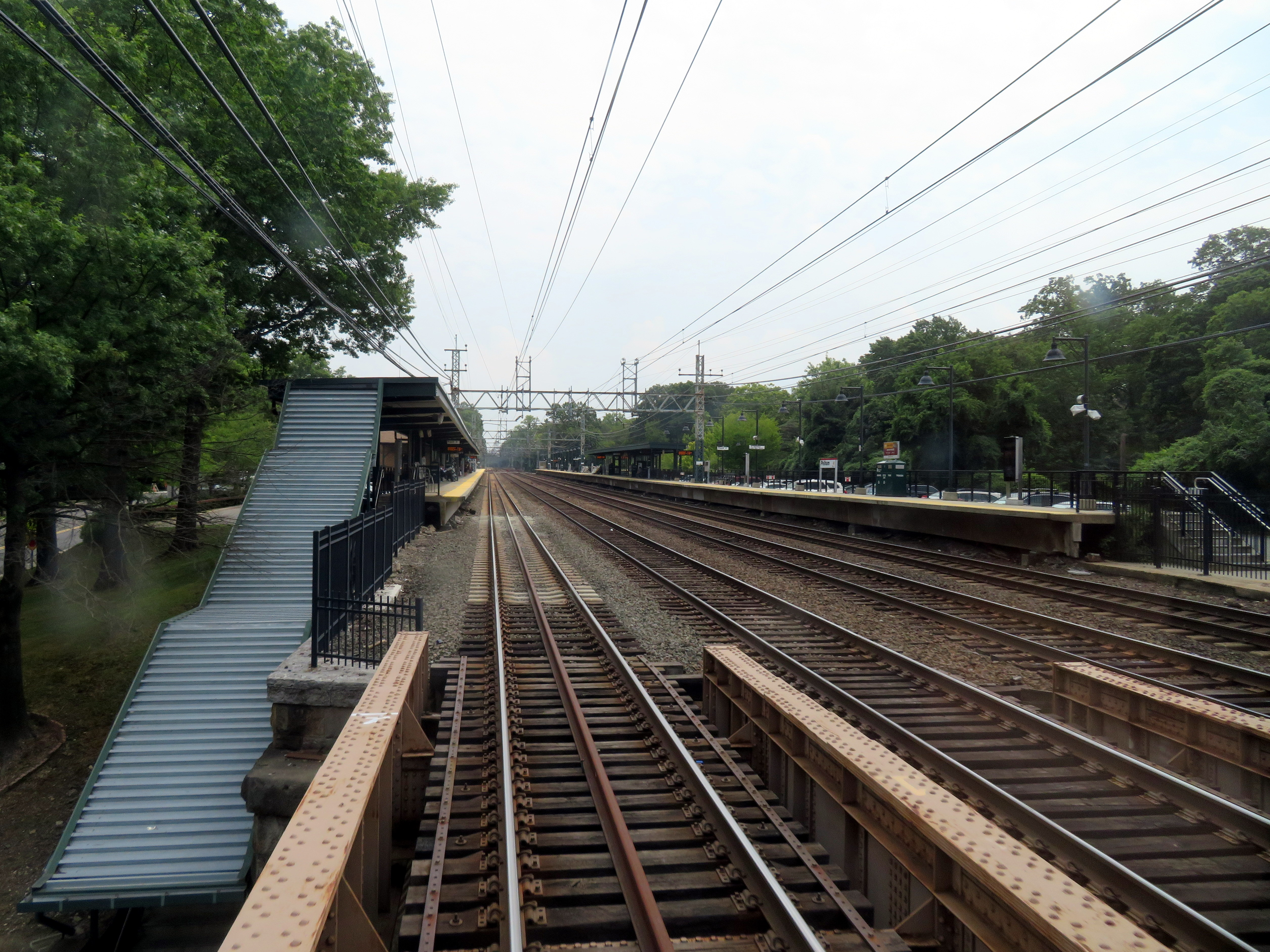
The west end of Pelham station in 2019, showing a staircase to Wolfs Lane

In July 1896, the railroad station and post office were renamed from Pelhamville to Pelham; the change in name followed the incorporation of Pelham Heights as the Village of Pelham and the incorporation of the Village of North Pelham. The new station was located on the north side of the railroad tracks, on the east side of Fifth Avenue/Wolfs Lane, and was accessed via a road that ran between Fifth Avenue/Wolfs Lane and Highbrook Avenue. Staircases were also included at the west end of both platforms to provide access to Wolfs Lane. The boundary between the villages of Pelham and North Pelham ran along the railroad tracks, with the station house and westbound platform being within the Village of North Pelham and the eastbound platform being within the Village of Pelham. In 1906, the Village of North Pelham petitioned that the name of the station be changed to "North Pelham", a proposition which was opposed by the Village of Pelham.

In 1898, a trolley line was constructed that ran south from the station along Wolfs Lane, Colonial Avenue and Pelhamdale Avenue; the main line turned east at Boston Post Road and a spur continued south to Pelham Manor station on the Harlem River Branch of the NYNH&H (the spur was extended to Shore Road in 1910). Operated by the Westchester Electric Railway, the trolley's schedule was aligned to meet the trains at both of the railroad stations. The trolley operated until 1937 and was known as the "Toonerville Trolley" as it inspired the creation of the Toonerville Folks comic strip by cartoonist Fontaine Fox.

The station was electrified with overhead catenary power in 1907. Although trains originally switched between catenary and third rail power at Woodlawn, the changeover point was moved to a location between the Mount Vernon East and Pelham stations in the early 1990s to eliminate maintenance and operational issues.

A ten-month renovation of the station was completed in June 1964. The brick walls of the station house were painted in red and the woodwork was painted in a contrasting white color. Landscaping was also added. The $10,000 renovation project was mostly funded by the Pelham Men's Club and the "Perk Up Pelham" Committee of the Junior League.

=== Takeover by Penn Central and MTA ===
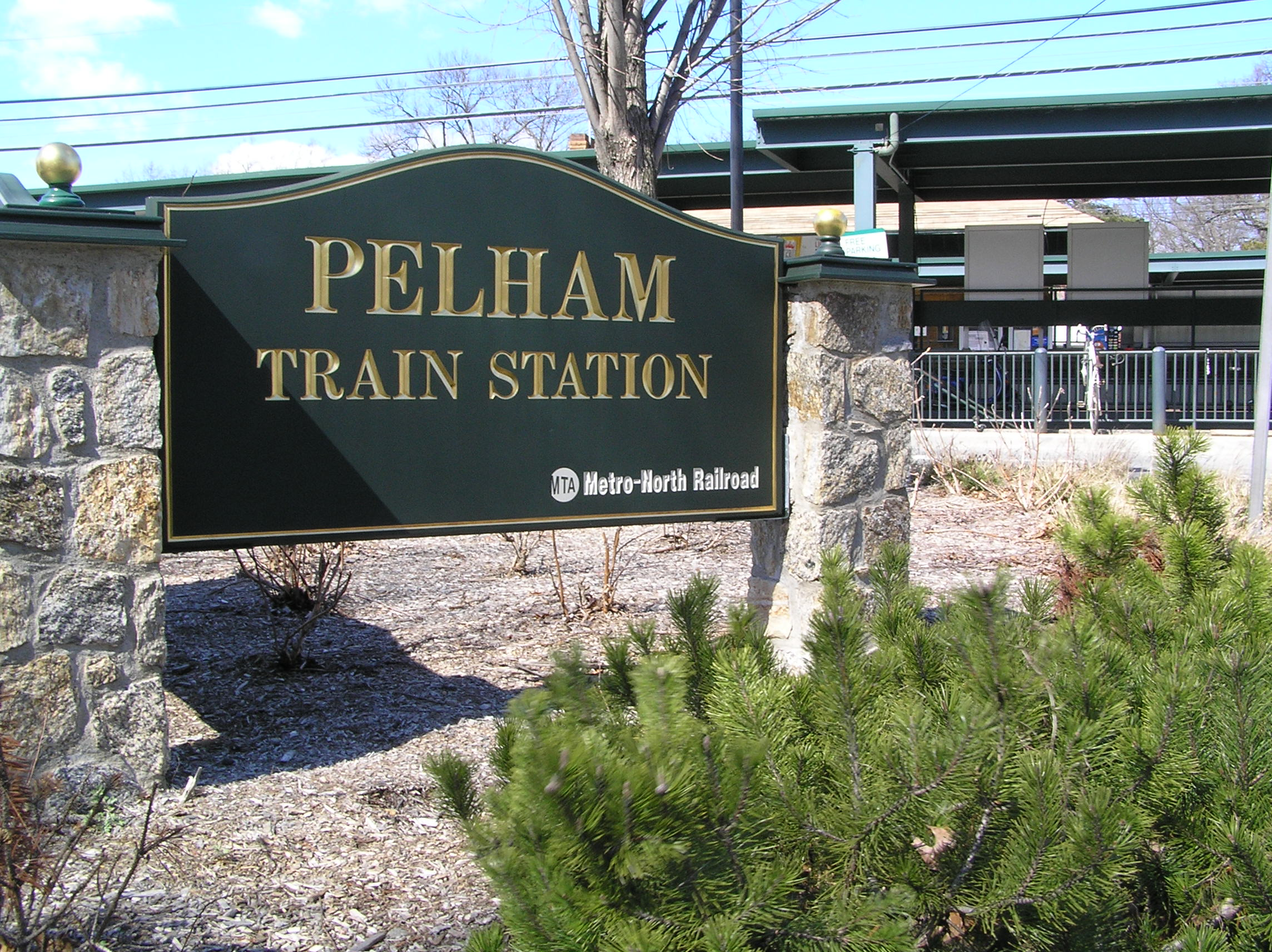
Pelham station eventually became part of the MTA's Metro-North Railroad.

As with all New Haven Line stations in Westchester County, the station became a Penn Central station upon acquisition by Penn Central in 1969, and eventually became part of the MTA's Metro-North Railroad. The MTA installed high-level platforms at Pelham in 1973. A nine-month, $150,000 renovation of the station was completed by Metro-North in 1986; which included adding a new roof to the station house, sandblasting the brick walls back to their original sandstone finish, replacing windows, doors and the flooring in the waiting room, remodeling the bathrooms, and restoring stained glass windows.

A coffee shop called the "Pelham Engine Stop" occupied a portion of the station building from 1979 until 2005. Artist Susan Nathenson originally took on the part-time job of working at the coffee shop in the mornings to the fund the opening of her art studio in Pelham. The Pelham Engine Shop remained at the station until 2005, when it was replaced by a new tenant that agreed to take on a net lease and invest in renovations to the station. At that same time, the real estate firm of Houlihan Lawrence also signed a net lease to occupy the portion of the station that was formerly used as a baggage room; the firm hired a preservation consultant to design the renovations for their new office space, which used historical photos and plans of the station house and also coordinated with the New York State Office of Parks, Recreation and Historic Preservation.

In 2004, Metro-North completed a $4.8 million renovation of Pelham station, which was funded by legislative grants obtained by New York State Senator Guy Velella and Metro-North's capital program. The project began in 2002 and included rehabilitating all of the parking lots at the station, the creation of a traffic circle to allow traffic at the First Street entrance to turn around when exiting the south side of the station, and the addition of antique lampposts, fencing, landscaping, retaining walls, and sidewalks. Reconfiguration of the north and south parking lots at the station resulted in the addition of 17 parking spaces for a total of 238 spaces (178 permit spots, 48 metered spots, and 8 handicapped meters). The renovations came after Metro-North had taken control of the parking spaces at the train station in 2000; previously it had leased out the parking spaces to the municipality. When the renovations were completed in 2004, there were still 401 people on the waiting list for parking at the station. Some commuters were able to obtain permits from municipal parking lots operated by the Village of Pelham, while others elected to pay for parking at local businesses and institutions that allowed commuters to park for a fee. As of 2006, the station had the lowest number of parking spaces among all New Haven Line stations within Westchester County. By 2013, the waiting list for parking at the station had grown to 446 names.

== Station layout ==
The station has two high-level side platforms, each 10 cars long, serving the outer tracks of the four-track line. A pedestrian underpass is located between both platforms.

=== Station house ===
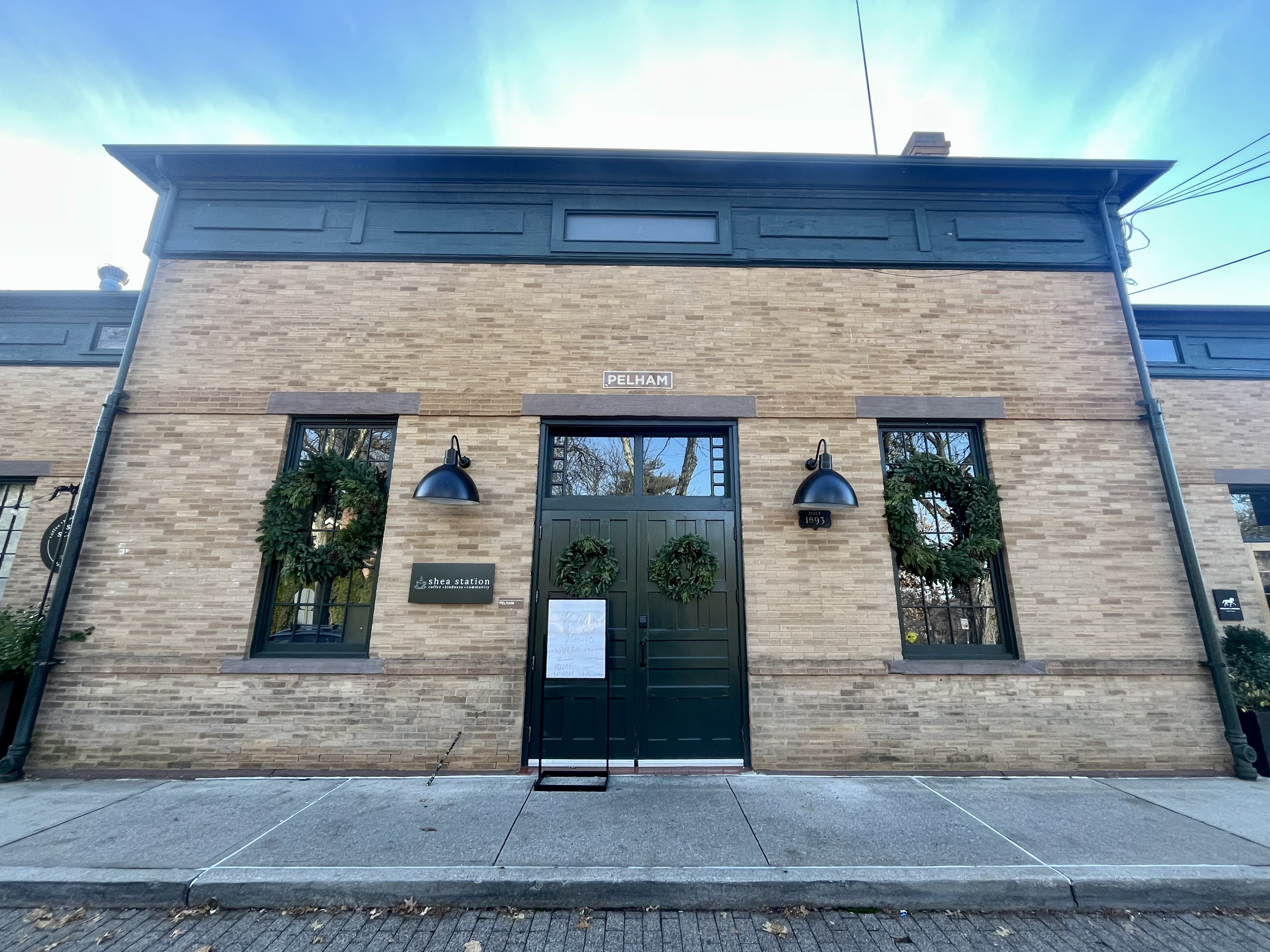
The station house in November 2025

The one-story building is designed in the Neoclassical style, but also contains elements of Greek Revival architecture on its exterior. The facade is clad in yellow brick and includes two stringcourses, which run above and below windows with simple lintels and sills, and a paneled wood cornice is located below the roofline. Transom windows are located above the doorways. The building has a gable roof over its central section that is flanked by hip roofs on the east and west wings; shed roofs are located on the east and west ends of the building that extend out as overhangs.

=== Parking ===
Pelham station includes a total of 343 parking spaces: 234 controlled by Metro-North (operated by LAZ Parking) and 109 controlled by the Village of Pelham. Metro-North has parking lots located on the north and south sides of the station that run between Fifth Avenue/Wolfs Lane and Highbrook Avenue. Municipal parking is located in on-street spaces along First Street and Nyac Avenue (located to the south of the station) and in parking lots located west of Fifth Avenue/Wolfs Lane.

== See also ==
- List of Metro-North Railroad stations
