= Pelham Memorial High School =

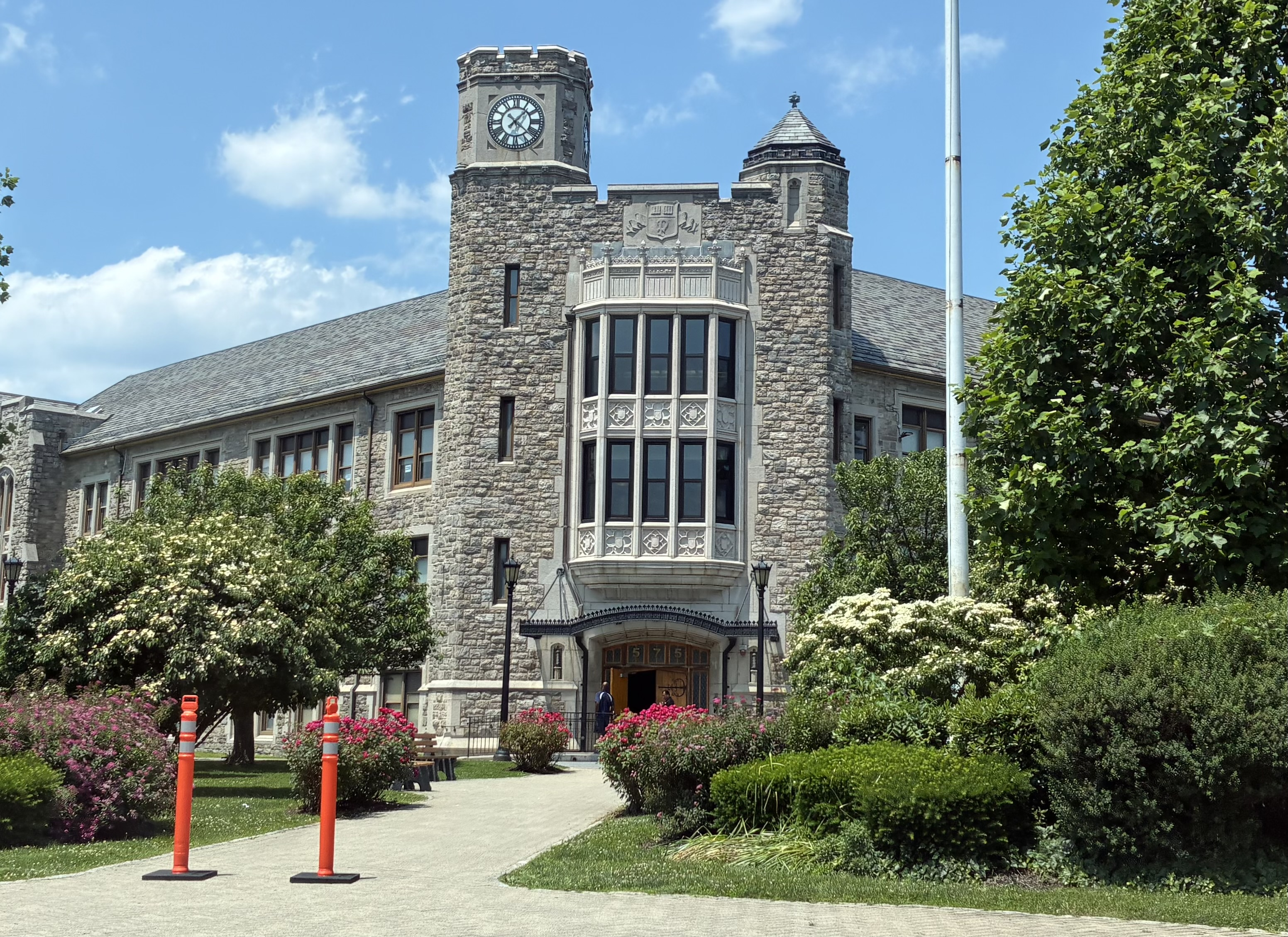

Location
- 575 Colonial Avenue; Pelham, New York 10803; United States; 40°54′11″N 73°48′42″W

Information
- Type: Public high school
- Established: 6 May 1922
- School district: Pelham Union Free School District
- Staff: 61.02 (FTE)
- Grades: 9-12
- Enrollment: 1,100 (2017–18)
- Student to teacher ratio: 11
- Colors: Blue and gold
- Athletics: Section 1 (NYSPHSAA)
- Mascot: Pelican
- Rival: Rye High School
- Newspaper: The Pel Mel
- Website: http://pmhs.pelhamschools.org

The Pelham Memorial High School is the only high school within the town of Pelham, New York, United States. It is part of the Pelham Union Free School District.

The district (of which this is the sole comprehensive high school) includes The Town of Pelham, which has Pelham Village and Pelham Manor Village. As of 1997 a small portion of land that is between Pelham and Pelham Bay Park, with a total of 35 houses, is a part of the Bronx but is cut off from the rest of the borough due to the way the county boundaries were established. The New York City government pays for the residents' children to go to Pelham Union Free School District (UFSD) schools, including Pelham Memorial High School, since that is more cost-effective than sending school buses to take the students to New York City Public Schools. This arrangement has been in place since 1948. As of 1997 one student at Pelham Memorial lived in this section, and New York City paid Pelham UFSD $15,892.86 per year for that student.

== History ==
Prior to 1918, the Siwanoy School housed elementary and secondary students in Pelham. However, the population was growing, and the facility was no longer able to accommodate all of the students. It was decided that the Pelham Memorial High School would be a memorial to World War I and all wars in which Pelham residents fought. "Honor Here the Ideals for Which They Fought" is the inscription above the main auditorium stage.

PMHS, which cost $373,000 to build, was dedicated on May 6, 1922. At the time it was completed, it was the biggest high school with the biggest field in Westchester County. This was the first of three sections that would later be constructed and attached as the number of students continuously increased. The second section, facing Corlies Avenue, was completed in 1924, costing $350,000. The third section, facing Franklin Place, was completed in 1929 with a cost of $575,000. The building continued to be enhanced throughout the years, including a new annex in 1963 that allowed for more classrooms and new science laboratories.

Later in the 20th century, the auto mechanic and other show classrooms were removed from the annex and converted to modern computer laboratories and art rooms. Wiring was also upgraded for new technology.

Community donations resulted in a new modern language lab, a biotechnology lab, and state-of-the-art sound and lighting equipment in the auditorium. Recently, the school has been significantly renovated with an upgraded library, auditorium, and science laboratories.

== Academics ==
Pelham Memorial High School students take a college preparatory curriculum that includes several mandatory classes for graduation. This includes four years of English, four years of social studies, three years of a foreign language, three years of math, three years of science (earth science is taken in eighth grade at Pelham Middle School, and Living Environment and Chemistry are required classes), and one art or music class in order to qualify for an Advanced Designation Regents Diploma, as opposed to a Regents Diploma. Health must be taken for one semester, and physical education must be taken for all four years.

Pelham currently offers Advanced Placement courses, with the intention of adding more as the budget allows. Among the courses offered are AP Art History, AP Art, AP European History, AP US Government and Politics, AP Statistics, AP Calculus AB, AP Calculus BC, AP Psychology, AP World History, AP US History, AP Spanish, AP Biology, AP Environmental Science, AP Physics, AP Chemistry, and AP Computer Science Principles, AP English Language and Ap English Literature. Most of these classes are only available to juniors and seniors.

The social studies department provides courses that follow the New York State core curriculum. Students are provided an honors program, which includes four Advanced Placement courses and multiple Syracuse University Project Advance courses, in addition to regents courses. At the culmination of the two-year Global History and Geography Courses the respective regents exam is taken, typically in tenth grade. The United States History and Government regents exam is typically administered in 11th grade. For students taking AP United States History, a concurrent Political Process Seminar is given in podcast form to satisfy the government requirement for graduation. Otherwise, students may take any of the Participation in Government, American Law, Criminal Justice, Sociology, or Politics and Public Policy courses as a senior to complete the requirement. AP European History and AP U.S. Government and Politics are also available to seniors. Students enrolled in AP European History complete their state economics requirement by enrolling in an Economics Seminar course. Otherwise an Economics course can be taken as a senior.

In grades nine and ten, students can take either regents or honors English courses. As of the 2015–16 school year, honors classes are open enrollment, and students who wish to take an honors class do not need to meet any criteria to do so. As a junior, either regents or Advanced Placement English Language and Composition can be taken. Finally in a student's senior year, they may take Advanced Placement Literature and Composition. During a student's freshman year, they must take Freshman Writing Seminar to graduate. This is a course designed to improve individual writing and learning abilities.

The Pelham mathematics department has undergone changes as a result of the Board of Regents restructuring its standardized exams. The department presently offers regents, honors, and advanced placement courses. Qualified eighth grade students are given the opportunity to take Integrated Algebra Honors to put them on the accelerated track. The Integrated Algebra regents exam is required to graduate. Following this same sequence, students take Geometry, Algebra II/Trigonometry, Pre-Calculus, and AP Calculus AB/BC. The Geometry regents is offered at the end of the course, and students who complete Algebra II/Trigonometry may take the Algebra II/Trigonometry regents if they so choose, but this regents exam is now optional, as of the 2016–17 school year. Students who wish to take the Algebra II/Trigonometry regents exam must take a supplementary zero period class in the second semester, as the new curriculum and the regents exam now focus on different aspects of algebra and trigonometry. Also offered to juniors and seniors is AP Statistics. During the 2011–12 school year, a Science Research pilot program was offered, allowing students to improve their statistical abilities for competition. There is an alternative two-year sequence of algebra which can be taken as well, typically in 9th and 10th grade.

The music department no longer offers AP Music Theory, but Music Theory 1 returned for the start of the 2017–18 school year. Band, chorus, or orchestra can be taken during zero period, from 7:32–8:12 a.m. Marching band is mandatory for all band students, and an auditioned jazz ensemble course is offered during seventh period every other day (formerly known as Stage Band). A smaller, auditioned chorus called Chamber Chorus is held during seventh period every other day.

Chamber Chorus participates in NYSSMA Majors each spring, as does the orchestra. The orchestra received a gold with honors distinction, the highest award possible, in spring of 2015, 2016, 2017 and 2018. Chamber Chorus received gold with honors distinction in the spring of 2016 and 2017. In the spring of 2018, the jazz ensemble began to participate in NYSSMA Majors and received a silver rating.

The science department follows the New York State core curriculum. All honors-level science courses cover additional topics which are not included in the core curriculum and go into greater depth with those topics which are included. All eighth grade students take Physical Setting: Earth Science, and take the regents as their final exam. As freshmen, students typically take Living Environment (Biology), then Physical Setting: Chemistry and Physical Setting: Physics are taken during sophomore and junior year respectively. Students interested in pursuing a career in science or medicine frequently take AP Biology or AP Environmental Science as a junior or senior. AP courses include AP Physics B, AP Environmental Science, AP Biology, and AP Chemistry. The latter has the reputation of being the hardest course offered at Pelham, and therefore is only given every other year. The Health Studies course is required to graduate and is normally offered to sophomores. However, this semester course may be taken at any point.

The Science Research department is a four-year elective program situated in the school's biotechnology laboratory. It allows students with a declared interest in science to conduct original research alongside of researchers at college, university, hospital, and medical school laboratories. The courses include Introduction to Science Research, which introduces students to the research experience with the basic skills necessary to conduct research experiments. Science Instrumentation and Problem Solving is the next course in the sequence. This teaches students how to adequately prepare reagents, perform sterilization exercises, run and maintain a biotechnology laboratory. Students also are instructed in various molecular biology techniques, such as DNA amplification via polymerase chain reaction, restriction enzyme analysis, and bacterial culture, identification, and transformation. In the summer before 11th grade, research students find a mentor to work with on an original research experiment. This is carried throughout most of the junior year with the students working on paper to present their findings. This is subsequently entered into the Siemens-Westinghouse and/or Intel Science Talent Search, as well as other science competitions. Students have previously been named semifinalists and region finalists, winning college scholarship money. Teacher Steven Beltecas has played a critical role in improving the school's performances at these competitions.

The World Language department prepares students for a life in a contemporary society where globalization brings many different cultures and languages together. Modern foreign languages include French, Spanish, and Italian I II and III. There are also honors/AP courses in French and Spanish. Spanish and Italian have a Syracuse University Project Advance course instead of this. Latin is offered to Latin IV/V. One foreign language credit is required to graduate; however, three are required to graduate with distinction. Students often take a two-year sequence of one language as seventh and eighth graders, which counts as one credit on their high school transcript.

== Rankings ==
In Niche's 2021 ranking, Pelham Memorial High School was ranked as the third-best school in Westchester County and the 20th best public high school in the state. In addition, Pelham's Science Research program is routinely recognized in competitions such as the International Science and Engineering Fair (ISEF).

== Honor societies ==
Pelham Memorial High School's Knight and Lamp Chapter of the National Honor Society is guided by the four principles of scholarship, leadership, character, and service. Juniors and seniors with an unweighted average of 89 and a weighted average of 91 are eligible for consideration. Students must exercise positive influence on their peers and contribute to the school environment. They should be leaders in the classroom, at work, and in extracurricular activities. A candidate should be able to demonstrate respect, responsibility, trustworthiness, caring and citizenship. Students must have completed ten hours of service to the school or community during grades 9 and 10 for juniors, and during grades 9, 10 and 11 for seniors. Once inducted, 40 hours must be completed by the end of the academic year. NHS students provide free tutoring to any students who request it through their guidance counselors.

Language honor societies include the French Honor Society, Latin Honor Society, Spanish Honor Society, and Italian Honor Society. The French Honor Society chapter is the Pelham Memorial High School Chapter of the Société Honoraire de Français. The Latin Honor Society Chapter is simply a local chapter. The Spanish Honor Society is The Federico Garcia Lorca Chapter. The Italian Honor Society is the Vittorio Emmanuele Chapter of the Società Onoraria Italica. These societies require an 80 average GPA and a 90 average in the year of induction. Students are eligible based on their grades in the first two quarters of their level IV and V years. Students must provide tutoring services upon request.

The school also has a chapter of the New York State Mathematics Honor Society for students with one and one half years of high school math while enrolled as a student in a high school only. Students must also presently be enrolled in an honors or AP course with an 85% average in all math courses and an 85% GPA.

The school has a chapter of the New York State Science Honor Society. This requires students to have completed four semesters of high school or college science. Candidates must have an 85% science course average and an 80% GPA. They must also have a 75% average in high school or college mathematics courses. Peer tutoring is strongly encouraged.

Pelham Memorial High School's chapter of Tri-M Music Honor Society requires students to maintain a minimum of 90% in their music class, achieve a score of 90 or better at Level 5 or 6 at NYSSMA Solo Festival, maintain a scholastic average of 80% or better, and work toward improving the Music Program. Tri-M members musically help younger students as well as their peers. Tri-M members perform in recitals at school. They also helped raise funds to build houses for the needy in the US as well as abroad.

== Sports ==
Pelham's hockey team has competed at the state level multiple times, and officially won a state title in 2017. More recently, its hockey team won a second state title in 2022.

== Notable alumni ==
- Alessandra Biaggi (born 1986), New York State Senator
- Nick Bollettieri (born 1931), tennis coach
- Felix Cavaliere (born 1942), lead singer of rock band The Rascals
- Kate Douglass (born 2001), Olympic swimmer
- Emily Greenhouse (born 1986), journalist and editor of The New York Review of Books
- Arthur Jaffe (born 1937), professor of mathematics at Harvard University
- Michael Schwerner (1939–1964), civil rights activist killed by the KKK
- Gary Scott (born 1968), professional baseball player
- Gene Stone (born 1951), writer
- James Stone (born 1947), business executive
- Jason Woliner (born 1980), comedy director
- Joseph Cross (born 1986), actor
