= Charles Lewis Bowman =

American architect (1890–1971)

Charles Lewis Bowman (1890 – May 31, 1971) was an American architect.

Born in New York City December 9, 1890 but raised in Mount Vernon, New York he graduated from Cornell University in Ithaca, New York with both his Bachelors (Class of 1912) and master's degree in architecture. Per a notice in The New York Times of the accomplishment, he was the first recipient of a fellowship in architecture awarded at Cornell as a standout student with several undergraduate awards.

His mother was a descendant of Col. Fielding Lewis and Betty Washington, the only sister of President George Washington.

His daughter Jean (1917–1994) would later found in 1980 the American Academy of Equine Art and be a noted sporting artist.

== Post graduation ==
Lewis would work for the prestigious firm of McKim, Mead and White in New York City as a draftsman during the summers of 1911 - 1913. He briefly joined the firm after graduation but left relatively shortly thereafter. He took a position with Mount Vernon based real estate and construction firm Gramatan Homes.

In 1918, after having establish good rapport with some of the best craftsmen in Westchester County, he established his own private firm.

A notable example from 1920 is the home for Frederick K. Shaff, Chairman of Combustion Engineering Super Heating in the Elm Rock estates section of Bronxville.

He was a listed member of The American Institute of Architects (AIA) 1932-1958

== Private practice ==
His firm's output was confined to the Northeastern section of the United States. During its lifespan an ever greater concentration of works were within the affluent community of Bronxville, New York. Within Bronxville works were even more pronounced in an elite section known as Lawrence Park. Bowman enjoyed a career of successful output until his last work in 1962.

His first solo works were completed in Mount Vernon, New York. Bowman went on to construct nine homes in Pelham, New York. Bowman's firm expanded to design homes in Westchester County, including Bronxville, Eastchester, New Rochelle and Scarsdale, and in more distant communities including Long Island, Reading, Pennsylvania, Englewood, New Jersey, Short Hills, New Jersey, Greenwich, Connecticut, and The Plains, Virginia. Many of Bowman's homes, including the Ohrstrom home, were constructed by the firm of Cuzzi Brothers & Singer, also of Mount Vernon, NY.

For client George Lewis Ohrstrom he designed "Old Mill Farm"" and following the divorce, remarriage and relocation of Mr. Ohrstrom to The Plains, Virginia he would design part of his "Whitewood" estate there. "Old Mill Farm" would be acquired by actor / director Mel Gibson in 1994 for a reported $9.25 million. The 77-acre (310,000 m^{2}) farm would be listed for sale in July 2007 at $39,500,000 through Sotheby's Realty. It eventually sold in April 2010 for just under $24 million.

Bowman's preferred style of home has been compared to the Stockbroker's Tudor, which became increasing popular due to the growth of suburbs. Many of these homes are still in use today, and have been noted for their materials, design, positioning, and size. Rarely were homes built over 5,000 square feet (460 m^{2}).

Bowman left his most concentrated mark as an architect upon the community of Bronxville, designing 53 homes, all but one of which survive today. Their styles vary from Georgian, Cotswold, and Tudor, to Normandy and Mediterranean. He was perhaps in his prime when he worked from English architectural roots with Jacobean designs displaying steep slate roofs, rich with stone or brickwork, timbering, leaded glass windows and clustered chimneys.

He designed for Robert and Dorothy (who went by the nickname of "Dickie") Roebling a three-story 10,000-square-foot (930 m^{2}) stone Norman style manor house on 18 acres (73,000 m^{2}) just outside Princeton, New Jersey in Lawrence Township. The home begun shortly after Bob and Dickie were married in 1925 would be completed in 1928. Robert was heir of the famed construction family, John A. Roebling's Sons Co, best known for building the Brooklyn Bridge. Known as Landfall the highly attractive manor house with its steep roofs, tall turrets and walled cobblestone court is extant today on 5 acres (20,000 m^{2}).

== Awards ==
The Greenwich Board of Trade awarded him a medal in 1931 for his outstanding design of "Old Mill Farm" in Greenwich, Connecticut. Commissioned by equestrian sportsman and financier George Lewis Ohrstrom the 137-acre (0.55 km^{2}) estate with the Elizabethan stone manor house and stable complex plus numerous outbuildings was all designed by Bowman.

The "Old Mill Farm" was exhibited at the Architectural League of New York in 1932 and was featured in several architectural publications - including the Architectural Record - of the day.

== Decline ==
Bowman was impacted in the late 1920s by an assistant, Robert Scannell, who struck out on his own taking several clients with him. The Great Depression resulted in him having to sell his home and have his family live in his studio. Later the changing tastes post World War II further impacted his fortune as the market for Tudor mansion was nonexistent.

He lived in an apartment from the mid-1960s until the time of his death in 1971.

== References and sources ==
Sources

- New York Times May 19, 1912 "C.L. Bowman Receives $500 to Continue Studies in Architecture"
- Cornell University Collection Number: 3807 "Charles Lewis Bowman Photographs And Drawings"
- Village of Bronxville "Prominent Village Architects"
- The Great Estates; Greenwich, Connecticut, 1880-1930 [Phoenix Publishing, 1986]
- Sotheby International Realty's listing for 'Old Mill Farm' Greenwich, CT (July 2007)
- History of the Roebling Family
- Artist Jean Bowman
- Obituary Bronxville Review Press and Reporter June 10 1971
