= Manor Club =

- U.S. National Register of Historic Places
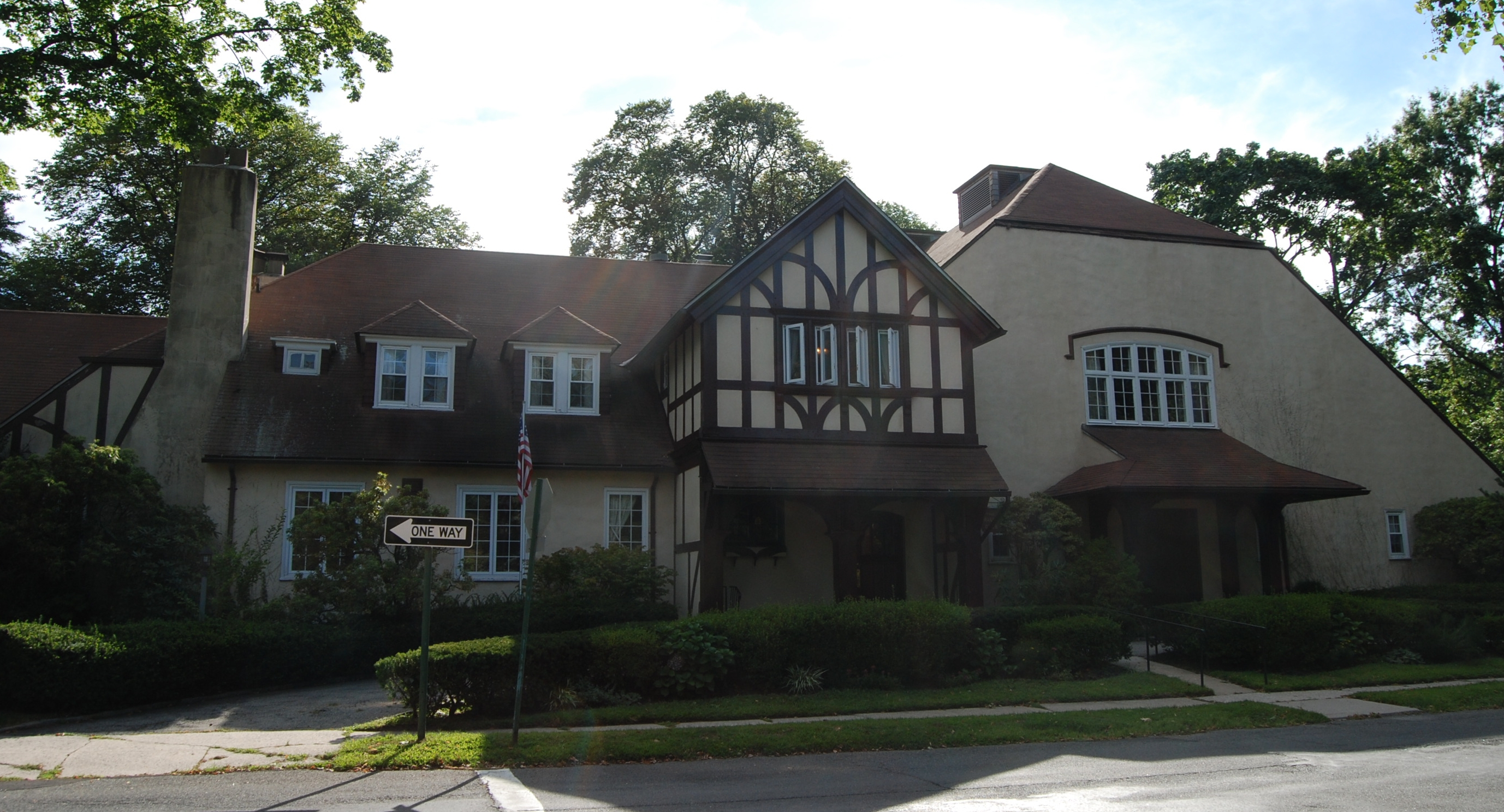
- Manor Club, September 2014

- Location within New York Location within the United States
- Location: 1023 Esplanade, Pelham Manor, New York
- Coordinates: 40°53′30″N 73°48′14″W
- Area: Approximately 1 acre (0.40 ha)
- Built: 1921-1922, 1933, 1935
- Built by: J.C. Lyons Sons Company
- Architect: Orchard, William H.
- Architectural style: Tudor Revival, Queen Anne
- NRHP reference No.: 14000207
- Added to NRHP: May 12, 2014

Manor Club is a historic clubhouse located at Pelham Manor, Westchester County, New York. It was built in 1921–1922, and is a Tudor Revival style L-shaped building consisting of a one-story sunroom, two-story main clubhouse, and three-story theater. The stuccoed building features half-timbering, bracketed timber entrances, and a large hipped roof. Some additions and modifications to the original building occurred in the 1930s. The building housed a local woman's club.

It was listed on the National Register of Historic Places in 2014.
