= Pelham Public Schools =

School district in New York, United States

Pelham Union Free School District

Address
- 18 Franklin Place Pelham Westchester County, New York, 10803; United States

District information
- Type: Public
- Grades: K-12
- Superintendent: Cheryl Champ
- Governing agency: New York State Education Department
- Schools: 4 elementary, 1 middle and; (Pelham Memorial High School)
- District ID: 3622680

Students and staff
- Students: 2,913
- Teachers: 279

Other information
- New York State District ID: 661601030000
- Website: www.pelhamschools.org

Pelham Public Schools or the Pelham Public School District, formally the Pelham Union Free School District, is a school district headquartered in Pelham Town, New York. It serves Pelham Town, which includes Pelham Manor and the Village of Pelham. As of 2016, the district had about 2,800 students. As of 1997, the City of New York pays the district to educate students in a portion of the Bronx due to geographic separation.

== History ==
In around 2013 Peter Giarrizzo became the superintendent. He resigned in 2017 as he became the superintendent of the North Shore Central School District. Cheryl Champ replaced him.

In 2020 the district banned displaying Thin Blue Line flags.

== Communities served ==
As of 1997 the City of New York pays the Pelham school district to provide educational services for a section of 35 houses in the Bronx located between Pelham and Pelham Bay Park and separated from the remainder of the borough; the city has done so since 1948 because the New York City Public Schools buses may not be insured if they leave the New York City limits, which they must do in order to reach this section of the Bronx, and because the bus trip would be very expensive. In 1997, five elementary school students and one high school student living in that section of the Bronx attended Pelham schools; New York City paid $15,892.86 each year for the high school student and $8,650.08 each year per elementary student.

== Schools ==
Secondary schools:

- Pelham Memorial High School
- Pelham Middle School

Primary schools:

- Colonial Elementary School
- Hutchinson Elementary School
- Prospect Hill Elementary School
- Siwanoy Elementary School
