= Edgewood House (Pelham Manor, New York) =

- U.S. National Register of Historic Places
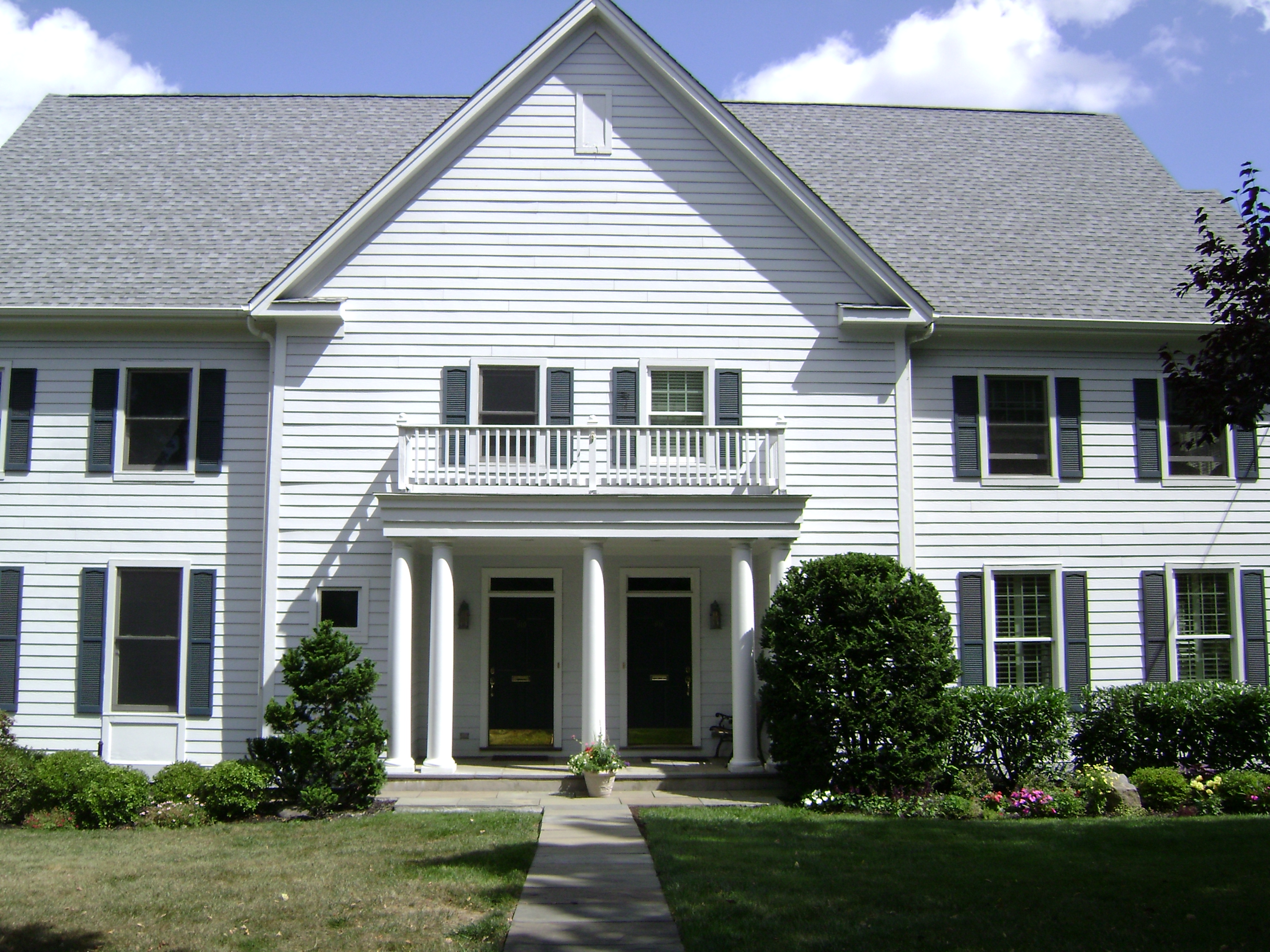

- Location within New York Location within the United States
- Location: 908 Edgewood Ave., Pelham Manor, New York
- Coordinates: 40°53′41″N 73°49′13″W
- Area: less than one acre
- Built: 1893
- Architectural style: Colonial Revival
- NRHP reference No.: 86001388
- Added to NRHP: June 26, 1986

Edgewood House is an historic school building located at Pelham Manor, Westchester County, New York. It was built in 1893 and is a 3 1/2-story, wood and masonry building in the Colonial Revival style. It is composed of a wide central gable roofed pavilion, flanked by flat-roofed wings of balanced proportions. It features deep porches and a large semi-elliptical bay window. It was once associated with Mrs. Hazen's School (1889-1915) and is representative of a turn-of-the-century academic building. The building once housed reception areas, classrooms, a gymnasium, dormitories, and staff quarters. It has been converted to apartments.

It was added to the National Register of Historic Places in 1986.

== See also ==
- National Register of Historic Places listings in southern Westchester County, New York
