= Mount Vernon East station =

Metro-North Railroad station in New York

Mt. Vernon East
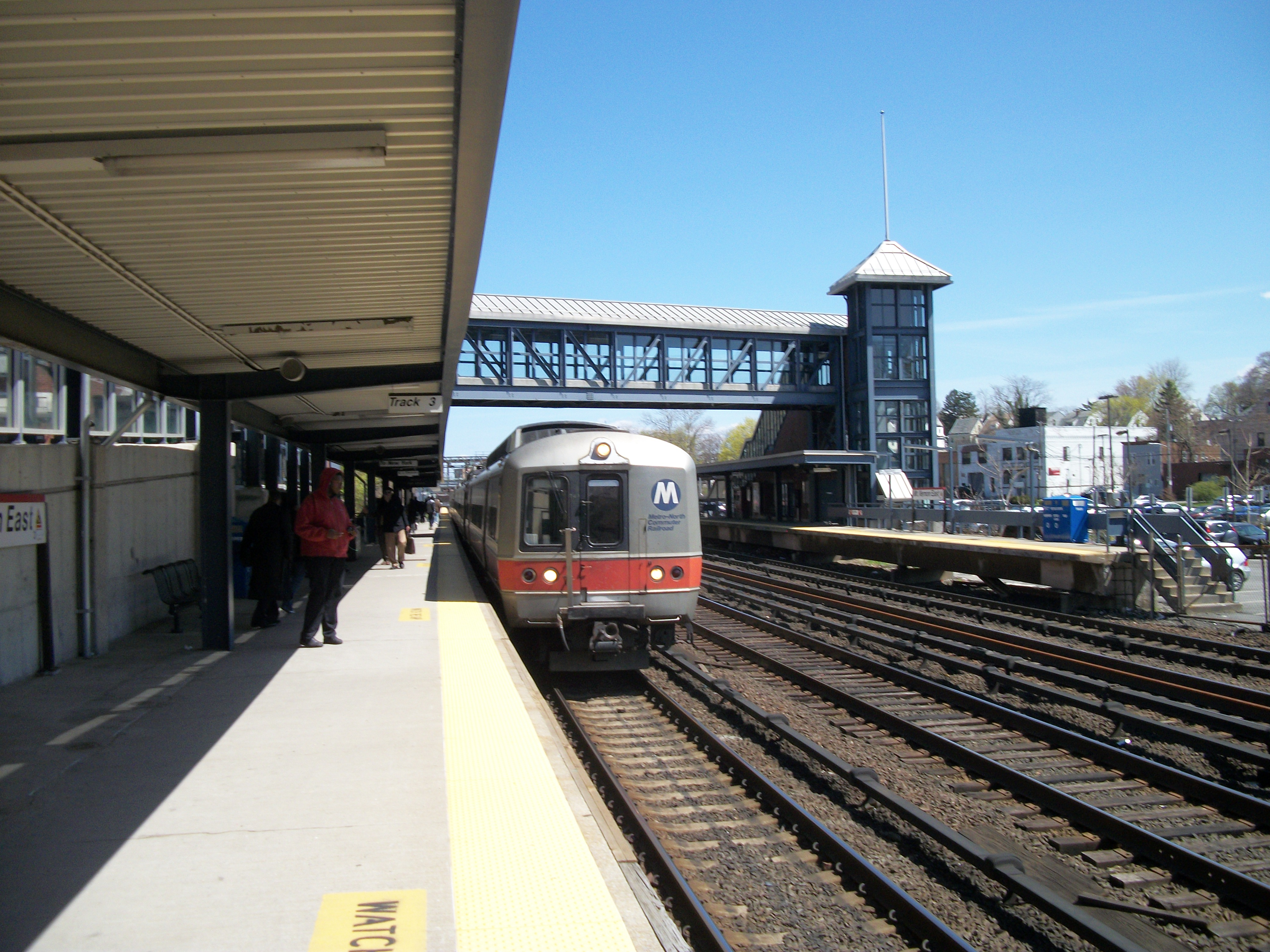
- A New York City-bound train arriving at Mount Vernon East station

General information
- Location: 1 East First Street; Mount Vernon, New York
- Coordinates: 40.911942°N 73.831678°W
- Owner: Metropolitan Transportation Authority
- Line: New Haven Line
- Platforms: 2 side platforms
- Tracks: 4
- Connections: Bee-Line Bus System: 7, 40, 41, 42, 43, 52, 53, 54, 55

Construction
- Parking: 283 spaces
- Accessible: yes

Other information
- Fare zone: 12

History
- Rebuilt: December 20, 1972
- Former names: Mount Vernon (December 20, 1972–c. 1997)

Passengers
- 2018: 2,876 daily boardings

Services
| Preceding station | Metro-North Railroad | Following station |
|---|---|---|
| Fordham toward Grand Central | New Haven Line | Pelham toward Stamford |
Special events service
| Preceding station | Metro-North Railroad | Following station |
|---|---|---|
| Yankees–East 153rd Street Terminus | New Haven Line Yankee Clipper | Pelham toward Stamford |
Former services
| Preceding station | New York, New Haven and Hartford Railroad | Following station |
|---|---|---|
| Harlem–125th Street toward New York | Main Line | Columbus Avenue toward New Haven |
Location

Mount Vernon East station is a commuter rail station on the Metro-North Railroad New Haven Line, located in Mount Vernon, New York. The station is the first station north of the junction where the New Haven Line splits from the Harlem Line and is the northernmost station on the line before it changes from third rail power to overhead catenary power, which takes place between the Mount Vernon East and Pelham stations.

== Station layout ==
The station has two high-level side platforms, each 850 feet (10 cars) long, serving the outer of the line's four tracks. The tracks are slightly below ground in a cut; a footbridge connects the platforms and entrances. The main entrances are located on Elm Avenue on the north side of the tracks, and in a parking lot off 1st Street on the south side; a staircase also connects the east end of the southern (northbound) platform to Fulton Avenue.

Bee-Line Bus System busses 53 and 54 stop at the Elm Avenue entrance to the station. Petrillo Plaza, on East Prospect Avenue slightly west of the station, is a hub for the Bee-Line Bus System. Busses servicing Petrillo Plaza are 7, 40, 41, 42, 43, 55, and 91.

== History ==
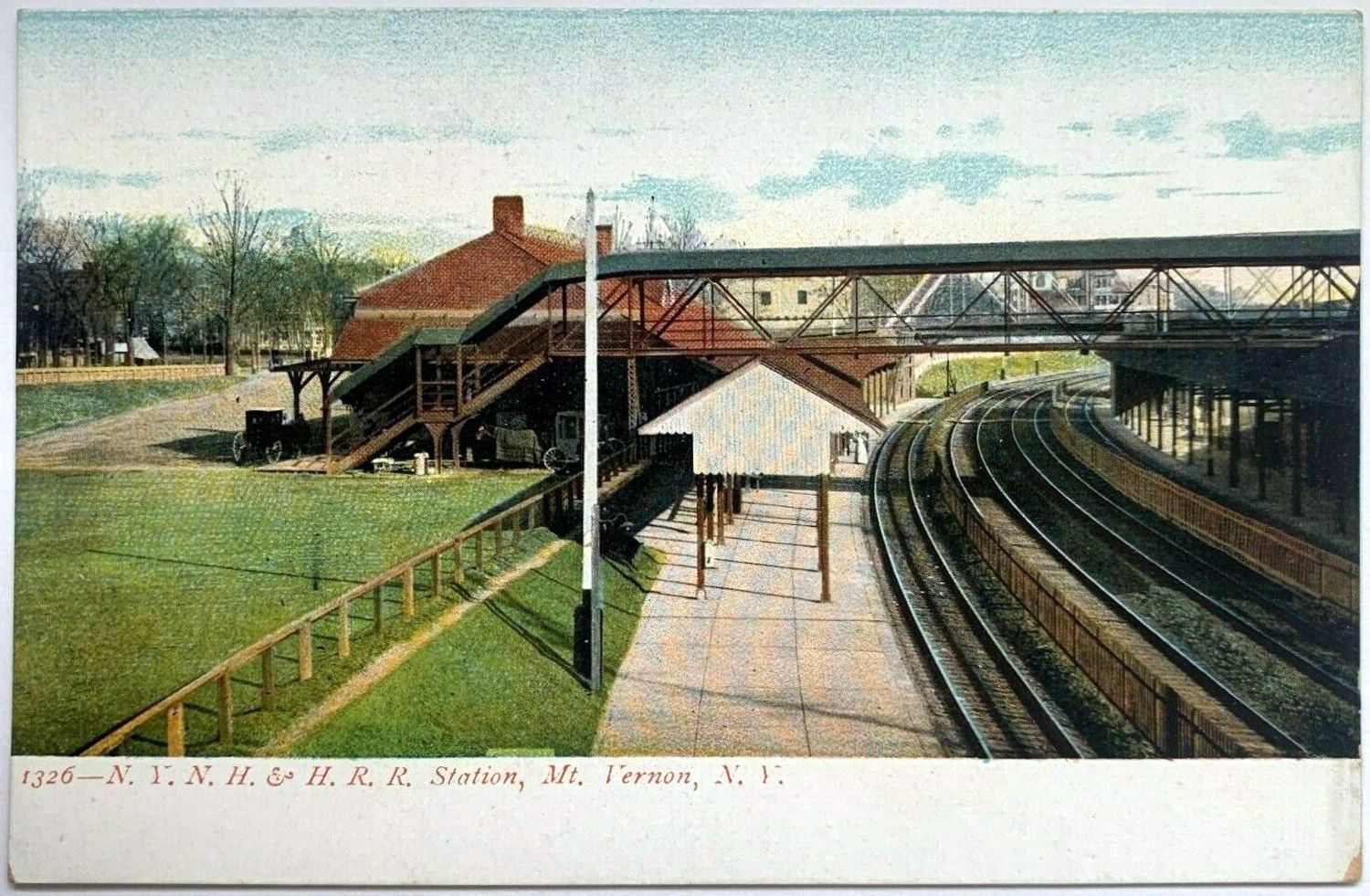
Early postcard of Mount Vernon station c. 1901–1907

The New York, New Haven and Hartford Railroad originally had two stations in Mount Vernon. Mount Vernon (Prospect Avenue) was located between 3rd Avenue and Park Avenue, slightly west of the modern station. Columbus Avenue station was located on the east side of Columbus Avenue; it was a transfer point to the New York, Westchester and Boston Railway – one of five NYW&B stations within the city. The station building was destroyed by a fire on March 31, 1957, though trains continued to stop.

Penn Central closed the two stations and replaced them with the Mount Vernon station on December 20, 1972. The new station was built with two high-level 850 feet (260 m) side platforms, allowing the new M2 cars to platform at the station. The two old stations were subsequently demolished.

In the early 1990s, third rail was installed at the station as a replacement for the catenary wires that dated back to 1907; this was done to eliminate maintenance and operational issues by moving the changeover point between catenary and third rail from Woodlawn to a location between the Mount Vernon East and Pelham stations.

Stained glass artwork named Tranquility by Marjorie Blackwell was installed in 2001. The station stood in for the Long Island Rail Road's Rockville Centre station during the filming of the 2004 movie Eternal Sunshine of the Spotless Mind.
