= Bolton Priory (Pelham Manor, New York) =

Historic house in New York, United States

- U.S. National Register of Historic Places
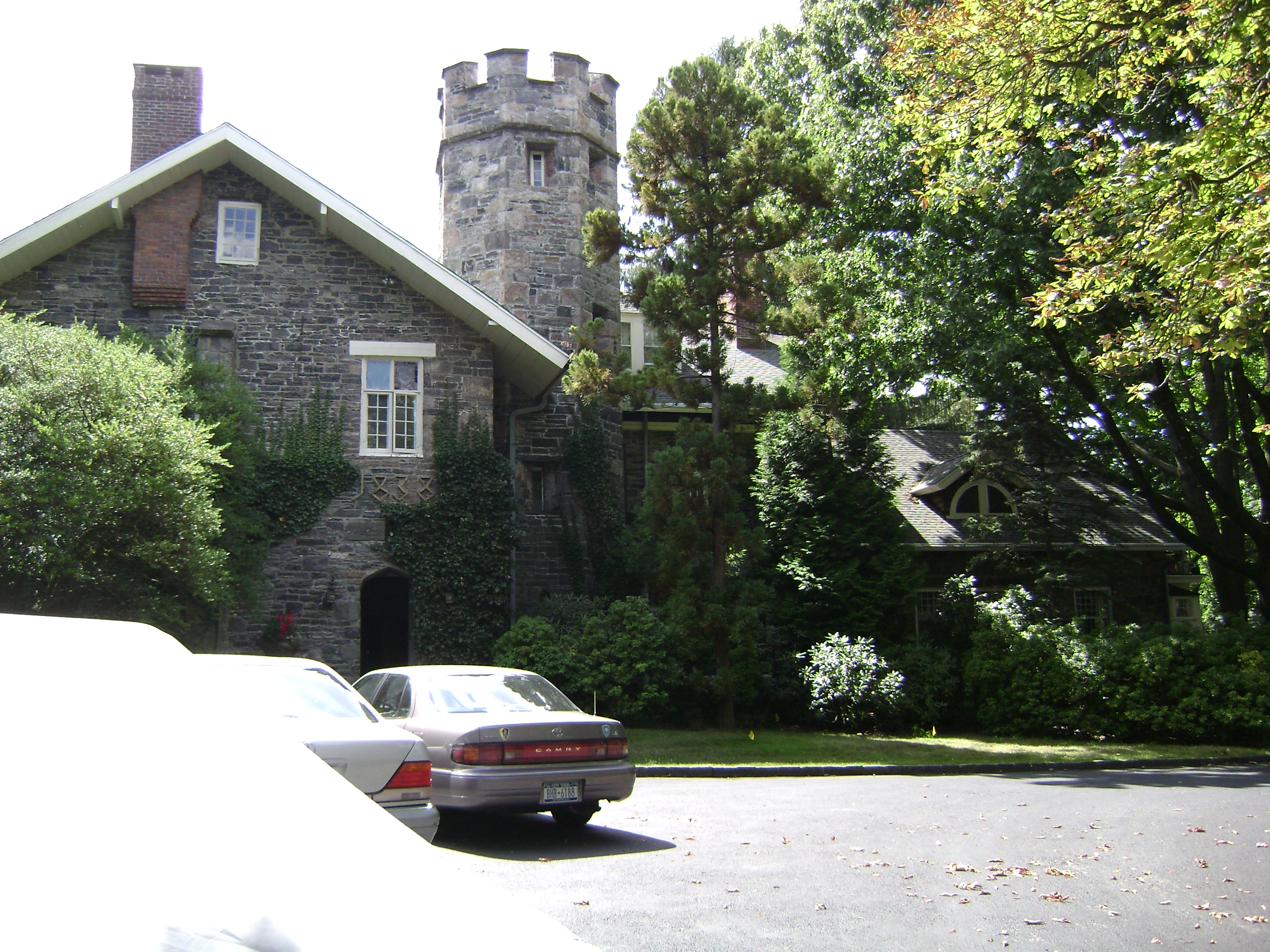

- Location within New York Location within the United States
- Location: 7 Priory Ln., Pelham Manor, New York
- Coordinates: 40°53′10″N 73°47′39″W
- Area: 3.7 acres (1.5 ha)
- Built: 1838
- Architect: Irving, Washington
- NRHP reference No.: 74001320
- Added to NRHP: June 28, 1974

Bolton Priory is a historic home built in 1838 for the Reverend Robert Bolton and his family, in the Village of Pelham Manor in Westchester County, New York. The home stands upon a wooded tract of land overlooking Pelham Bay; the once large estate surrounding it has now diminished to 3.7 acres. Influenced by the Romantic Movement in England, Bolton chose to design the house in the Romantic idiom. The building was designed to appear as if it had been constructed over a period of time; stone was used in one section and brick in another, to give the impression of various additions.

Bolton Priory serves as a good reflection of both the lifestyle and tastes of a cultivated, influential family in mid-19th century rural Pelham as well as a great example of the romantic theories of architectural design emerging in America at that time. The Priory was illustrated in the first edition of Andrew Jackson Downing's influential Theory and Practice of Landscape Gardening published in 1841, in which he described it as a "highly unique residence in the old English style".

The home was added to the National Register of Historic Places in 1974.

== Overview ==
Purchased from the Siwanoy Indians by Thomas Pell in 1654 the tract of land known as Pelham had become by 1790 a largely agrarian settlement with a population of 199, of which 38 were slaves. Its relative proximity to New York City resulted for much of the succeeding century in the use of rural Pelham both as working farmland and as country estates for men associated with the economic and cultural life of the City to the south.

Born in the United States in 1778, Robert Bolton traveled as a young man to England where he received an education as a minister and married Ann Jay, daughter of an English clergyman. Returning to America with his family of 13 children, Bolton in 1836 was given St. Paul's Parish in the Town of Eastchester, Westchester County, and settled on a farm on the site of the present village of Bronxville. The following year Bolton purchased 38 acres on Shore Road in the settlement of Pelham on which he completed the Priory residence in 1838.

It is believed that Washington Irving, a friend of Bolton's, was closely associated with the design of both the house and the surrounding gardens. Bolton's sons executed much of the interior finishing themselves, including the richly carved woodwork. and the stained glass made by William Jay Bolton, a pioneer in the manufacture of stained glass in America.

== Design ==
The main structure is composed of a long two-story block intersected by a gabled two-story wing, with a crenelated four-story octagonal tower at the northern angle of that junction and a crenelated three-story square brick tower at the southwestern end of the main block. Washington Irving gave yellow bricks from the Old Dutch Church of Sleepy Hollow to outline the construction date on the wall above the door.

The interior, also essentially little altered from the 19th-century scheme, contains a number of well-proportioned areas on the first floor. On the second floor, eight rooms are accessible from the main hall which extends the full length of the house. The craftsmanship attributed to Robert Bolton's sons is exhibited in the richly detailed woodwork such as mantels and built-in bookcases.

Situated in the vicinity of the Priory are several structures associated with the property: Christ Church (1843), Christ Church Parish House (1845, 1876), Bolton Memorial Building (ca. 1848), Bolton Cottage (1810), and the Stables (1895).

== See also ==
- National Register of Historic Places listings in southern Westchester County, New York
