= Pelham Bay (disambiguation) =

Pelham Bay may refer to the following in the Bronx, New York City, within the U.S. state of New York:

- Pelham Bay, a body of water
- Pelham Bay (neighborhood), Bronx
- Pelham Bay Park, a park
- Pelham Bay Park (IRT Pelham Line), a subway station
