= The Taking of Pelham One Two Three =

The Taking of Pelham One Two Three or The Taking of Pelham 123 can refer to:

- The Taking of Pelham One Two Three (novel), a 1973 thriller novel by Morton Freedgood writing as "John Godey"
- The Taking of Pelham One Two Three (1974 film), a film adaptation directed by Joseph Sargent and starring Walter Matthau and Robert Shaw
- The Taking of Pelham One Two Three (1998 film), a television movie directed by Félix Enríquez Alcalá and starring Edward James Olmos and Vincent D'Onofrio
- The Taking of Pelham 123 (2009 film), a film adaptation directed by Tony Scott and starring Denzel Washington and John Travolta
