= Gary Scott (baseball) =

American baseball player (born 1968)

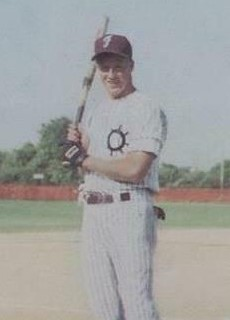
- Third baseman
- Born: August 22, 1968 (age 57); New Rochelle, New York, U.S.
- Batted: Right Threw: Right

MLB debut
- April 9, 1991, for the Chicago Cubs

Last MLB appearance
- October 3, 1992, for the Chicago Cubs

MLB statistics
- Batting average: .160
- Home runs: 3
- Runs batted in: 16
- Stats at Baseball Reference

Teams
- Chicago Cubs (1991–1992)

Gary Thomas Scott (born August 22, 1968) is an American former baseball player, who played as third baseman for the Chicago Cubs in 1991 and 1992.

A native of New Rochelle, New York, Scott attended Pelham Memorial High School. At Pelham, he was the basketball team's all-time leading scorer and the quarterback of the football team. He received no scholarship offers to play college baseball but received several scholarship offers from NCAA Division I basketball programs. It was during a recruiting trip to Drexel that he decided to contact the baseball coach at nearby Villanova University about walking on to the baseball team.

He played college baseball at Villanova, where he was named to the 1989 Big East Conference baseball tournament all-tournament team. In 1987, he played collegiate summer baseball with the Wareham Gatemen of the Cape Cod Baseball League, and returned to the league in 1988 to play for the Falmouth Commodores. He was selected by the Chicago Cubs in the second round of the 1989 MLB draft.

In each of his two major league seasons, Scott was the opening day third baseman for Chicago, but in each case he was back in the minor leagues within a few weeks. In 1991, Scott batted .165 until May 14, when the Cubs sent him down. On April 20, 1992, he was batting .103 when he cracked a grand slam at Wrigley Field. He was then sent down three games later. Scott was called up a few more times during that year but never reached the majors again, continuing to play in the minor leagues until 1996 before retiring.
