= Picture House Regional Film Center =

- Pelham Picture House
- U.S. National Register of Historic Places
- New York State Register of Historic Places
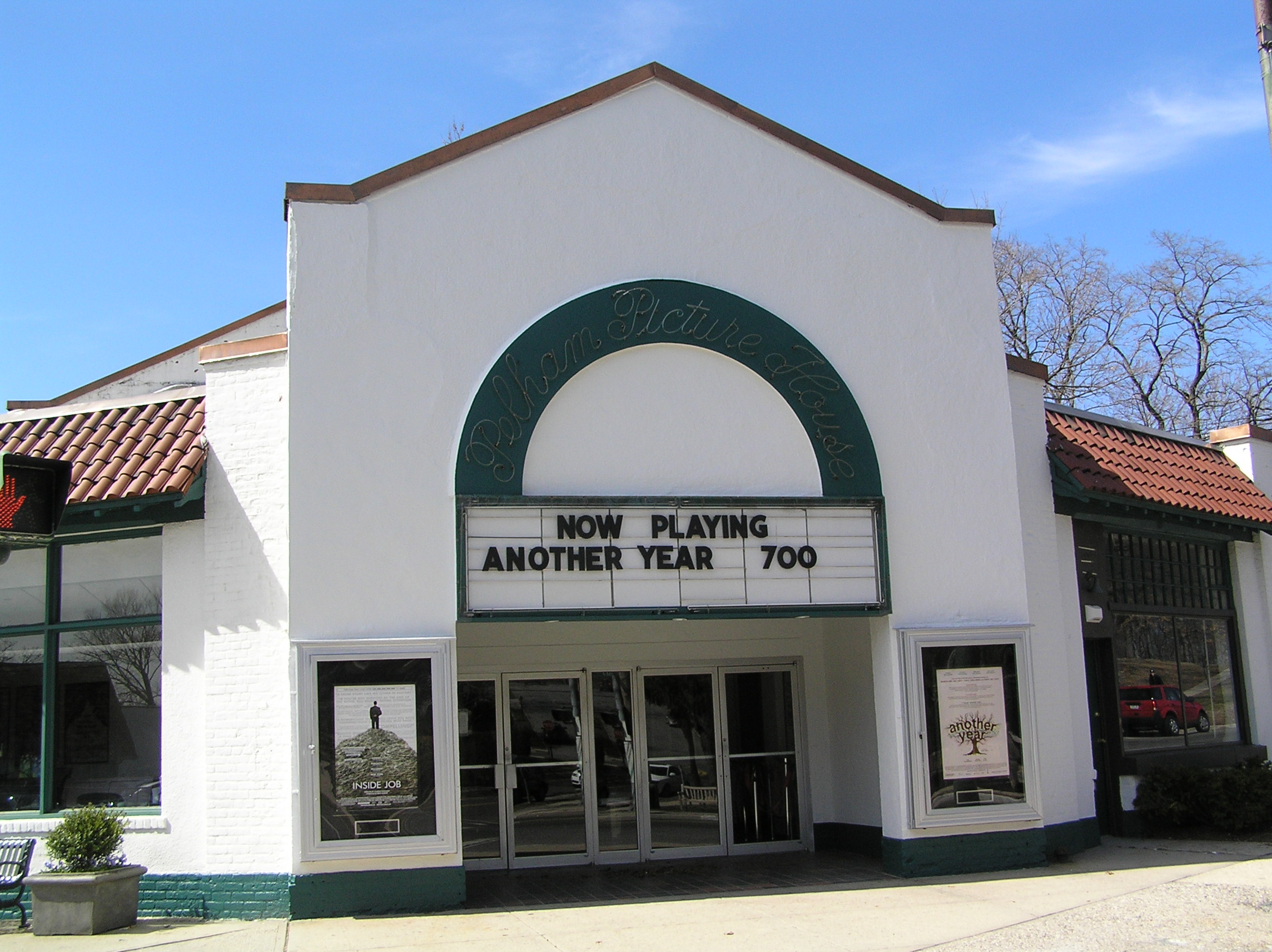
- Picture House Regional Film Center, 2011

- Location within New York Location within the United States
- Location: 175 Wolfs Lane, Pelham, New York
- Coordinates: 40°54′33″N 73°48′42″W
- Area: less than one acre
- Built: 1921
- Architectural style: Mission/spanish Revival
- NRHP reference No.: 10000305
- NYSRHP No.: 11968.000009

Significant dates
- Added to NRHP: May 28, 2010
- Designated NYSRHP: April 7, 2010

The Picture House Regional Film Center, formerly known as the Pelham Picture House, is a historic movie theater located in Pelham, New York. The rectangular building was built in 1921, in the Spanish Revival style and is oriented at an angle at the northwest corner of Wolf's Lane and Brookside Avenue. It features angled end bays, a distinctive round arched entrance, tiled hoods over the large windows on the end bays, and a wood open truss ceiling in the auditorium. The building typifies early 20th century commercial architecture of New York City commuter suburbs with its eclectic style reflective of the Mission style.

The theater was privately owned until it was put up for sale in 2003. Fearing that the historic building would be torn down, a group of Westchester citizens formed the non-profit organization Pelham Picture House Preservation and bought the building. The name of the organization was changed to the Picture House Regional Film Center in 2005. The Picture House operates with film and education programming at the 175 Wolfs Lane location and in area schools. The theater also hosts birthday parties.

It was added to the National Register of Historic Places in 2010.

== See also ==
- National Register of Historic Places listings in southern Westchester County, New York
