= Pelham Manor, New York =

Pelham Manor
- Village
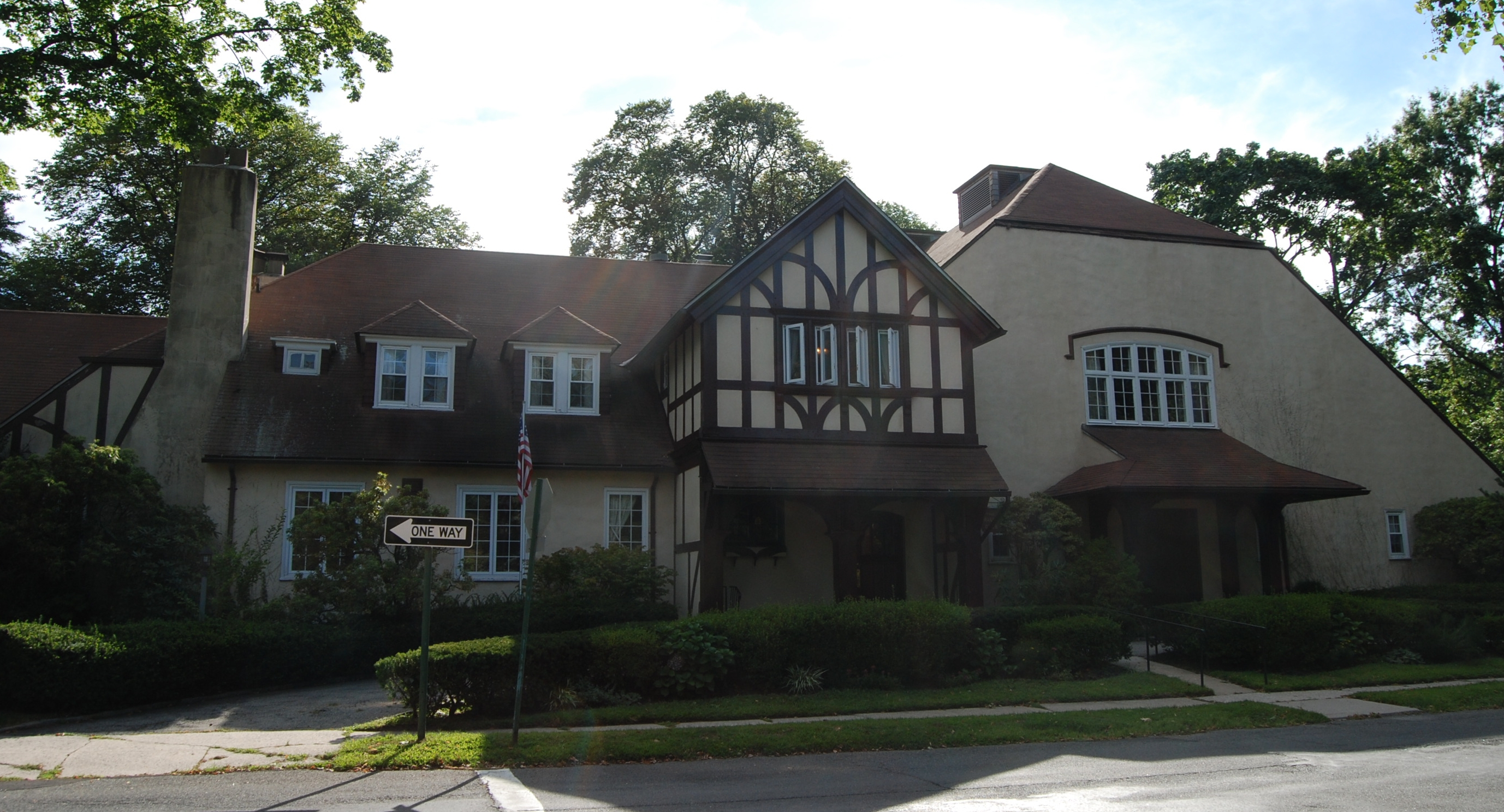
- The Manor Club of Pelham

- Flag Seal

- Location of Pelham Manor in Westchester County, New York
- Coordinates: 40°53′35″N 73°48′27″W
- Country: United States
- State: New York
- County: Westchester
- Town: Pelham

Government
  - Mayor: Jennifer Monachino Lapey http://www.pelhammanor.org/board-of-trustees

Area
  - Total: 1.40 sq mi (3.62 km^{2})
  - Land: 1.35 sq mi (3.50 km^{2})
  - Water: 0.042 sq mi (0.11 km^{2})

Population (2020)
  - Total: 5,752
  - Density: 4,252.3/sq mi (1,641.81/km^{2})
- Time zone: UTC-5 (Eastern (EST))
  - Summer (DST): UTC-4 (EDT)
- FIPS code: 36-57023
- Website: https://www.pelhammanor.gov/

Pelham Manor is an affluent village located in Westchester County, New York, United States. As of the 2020 census, the village had a total population of 5,752. It is located in the town of Pelham.

== History ==
In 1873, the opening of Pelham Manor station on the Harlem River Branch of the New York, New Haven and Hartford Railroad led to real estate development in the surrounding area, including Chestnut Grove between Boston Post Road and the train station and Manor Circle to the east of the station. After train service to Pelham Manor station was discontinued in 1930, the Cass Gilbert–designed station house was used by the Westchester Model Club until the building was demolished in 1955 to make way for the New England Thruway.

The Bolton Priory, Edgewood House, Manor Club, and Pelhamdale are listed on the National Register of Historic Places.

== Geography ==
=== Climate ===
Climate data for Pelham Manor, NY
Month	Jan	Feb	Mar	Apr	May	Jun	Jul	Aug	Sep	Oct	Nov	Dec	Year
Record high °F	73	75	86	96	97	99	104	102	101	89	82	77	104
Mean daily maximum °F	39.2	42.9	51.4	62.6	73.8	81.6	86.0	83.9	76.1	65.4	55.1	43.8	63.5
Mean daily minimum °F	20.1	22.3	29.1	38.4	47.2	56.8	62.3	60.8	53.0	41.2	34.6	25.6	41.0
Record low °F	−10	−5	2	17	29	38	49	44	34	27	12	−4	−10
Average precipitation inches	3.56	2.84	4.07	4.16	4.33	3.44	4.20	3.93	4.37	3.67	4.09	3.80	46.46
Average snowfall inches	9.8	10.9	6.8	1.4	.2	0	0	0	0	.1	.8	8.6	38.6
Record high °C	23	24	30	36	36	37	40	39	38	32	28	25	40
Mean daily maximum °C	4.0	6.1	10.8	17.0	23.2	27.6	30.0	28.8	24.5	18.6	12.8	6.6	17.5
Mean daily minimum °C	−6.6	−5.4	−1.6	3.6	8.4	13.8	16.8	16.0	11.7	5.1	1.4	−3.6	5.0
Record low °C	−23	−21	−17	−8	−2	3	9	7	1	−3	−11	−20	−23
Average precipitation mm	90	72	103	106	110	87	107	100	111	93	104	97	1,180
Average snowfall cm	25	28	17	3.6	0.51	0	0	0	0	0.25	2.0	22	98
Average rainy days (≥ 0.01 in)	8.5	8.1	9.3	9.8	10.9	9.3	9.0	8.7	7.6	6.7	9.2	9.4	113.4
Source 1: Weatherbase
Source 2: Homefacts (precipitation only) The Weather Channel (extremes)

== Demographics ==
Historical population
Census	Pop.	Note	%±
1910	852		—
1920	1,754		105.9%
1930	4,908		179.8%
1940	5,302		8.0%
1950	5,306		0.1%
1960	6,114		15.2%
1970	6,673		9.1%
1980	6,130		−8.1%
1990	5,443		−11.2%
2000	5,466		0.4%
2010	5,486		0.4%
2020	5,752		4.8%
U.S. Decennial Census

As of the census of 2000, there were 5,466 people, 1,862 households, and 1,504 families residing in the village. The population density was 4,121.3 inhabitants per square mile (1,591.2/km^{2}). There were 1,909 housing units at an average density of 1,439.4 per square mile (555.8/km^{2}). The racial makeup of the village was 92.15% White, 2.12% African American, 0.07% Native American, 2.80% Asian, 0.00% Pacific Islander, 1.06% from other races, and 1.79% from two or more races. 4.63% of the population were Hispanic or Latino of any race.

There were 1,862 households, out of which 43.3% had children under the age of 18 living with them, 71.1% were married couples living together, 7.4% had a female householder with no husband present, and 19.2% were non-families. 17.5% of all households were made up of individuals, and 8.2% had someone living alone who was 65 years of age or older. The average household size was 2.93 and the average family size was 3.32.

In the village, the population was spread out, with 31.9% under the age of 19, 4.0% from 18 to 24, 25.4% from 25 to 44, 26.9% from 45 to 64, and 14.0% who were 65 years of age or older. The median age was 40 years. For every 100 females, there were 94.6 males. For every 100 females age 18 and over, there were 86.8 males.

The average household income in the village was $253,261, and the median income for a family was $154,865. Males had a median income of $93,054 versus $52,424 for females. The per capita income for the village was $61,104. 4.3% of the population and 3.1% of families were below the poverty line. Out of the total population, 5.8% of those under the age of 18 and 2.7% of those 65 and older were living below the poverty line.

== Economy ==
=== Shopping ===
Four Corners, at the intersection of Boston Post Road (US1) and Pelhamdale Avenue, boasts two mini strip malls, facing each other on either side of Boston Post Road.

Post Road Plaza is a shopping mall located on the Pelham Manor/Bronx border, at 895 Pelham Parkway, at the intersection of Boston Post Road (US 1), Pelham Parkway, and the Hutchinson River Parkway.

== Education ==
Pelham Manor is within the Pelham Union Free School District. Prospect Hill and Siwanoy elementary schools cover portions of the village. Pelham Middle School and Pelham Memorial High School are the district's middle school and comprehensive high school, respectively.

== See also ==
- Philip Pell
- Pelhamdale
