= Pelham (village), New York =

Village of Pelham, New York
- Village
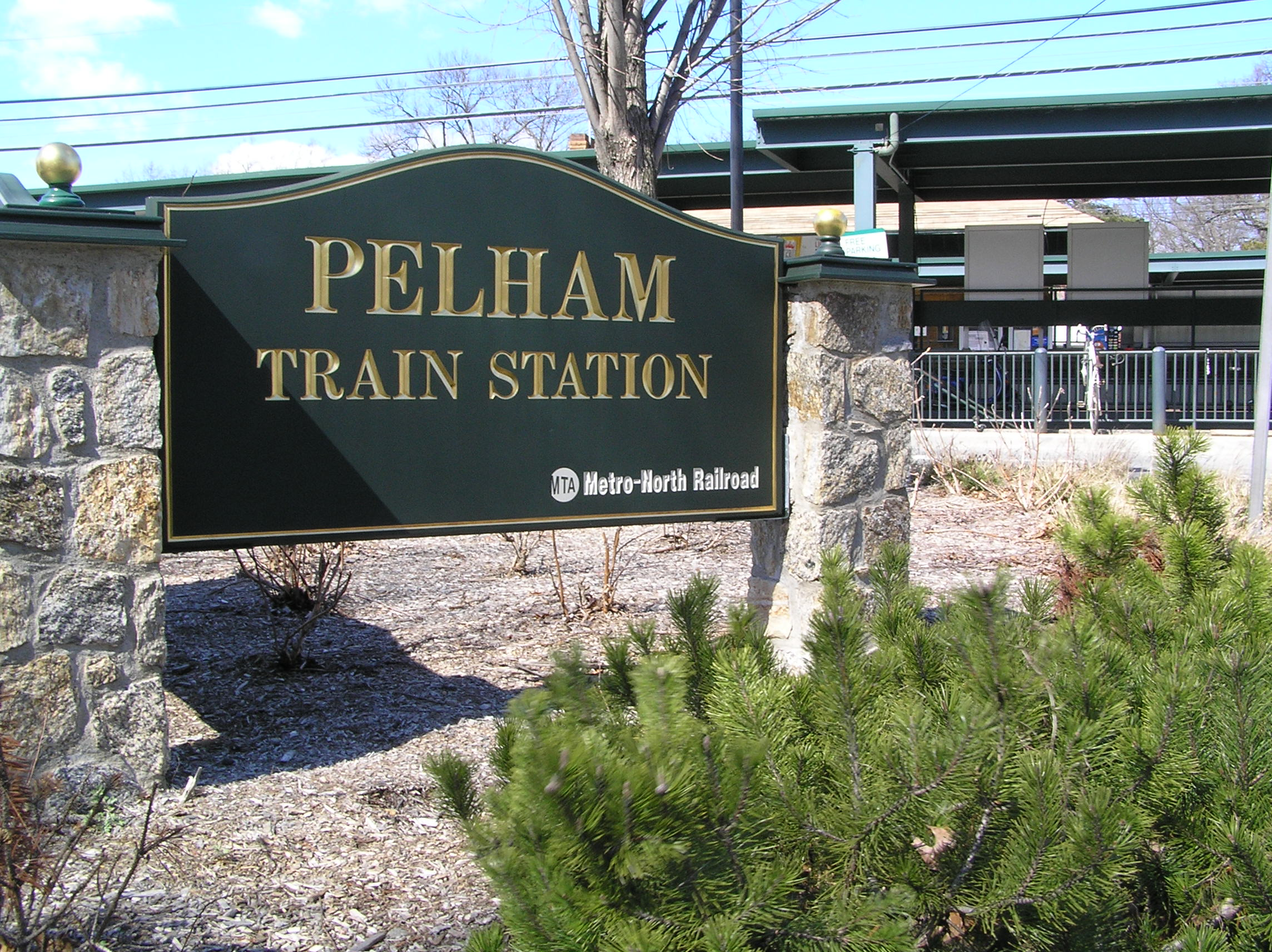
- Pelham station is located within the village

- Flag Seal Logo
- Nickname: Pelham Village
- Location of Pelham (village), New York
- Coordinates: 40°54′38″N 73°48′27″W
- Country: United States
- State: New York
- County: Westchester
- Town: Pelham

Area
  - Total: 0.83 sq mi (2.14 km^{2})
  - Land: 0.82 sq mi (2.13 km^{2})
  - Water: 0.0039 sq mi (0.01 km^{2})
- Elevation: 72 ft (22 m)

Population (2020)
  - Total: 7,326
  - Density: 8,910.7/sq mi (3,440.43/km^{2})
- Time zone: UTC-5 (Eastern (EST))
  - Summer (DST): UTC-4 (EDT)
- ZIP code: 10803
- Area code: 914
- FIPS code: 36-57001
- GNIS feature ID: 0960106
- Website: https://www.pelhamny.gov/

The village of Pelham is a village in Westchester County, New York, United States. The population was 6,910 at the 2010 census. It is located in the town of Pelham, which is colloquially referred to as Pelham.

== History ==
On June 27, 1654, Thomas Pell purchased 9,166 acres (37.09 km^{2}) from the Native American tribe of the Siwanoys. The purchase included an area which is known today as Pelham, New Rochelle, and portions of Bronx County. Among the land that he purchased, of course, was all the land that constitutes today's village of Pelham. Upon his death in 1669, Thomas Pell left the land to his nephew and sole heir, John Pell.

The original Village of Pelham was incorporated in 1896, bounded by the New Haven Railroad's main line to north, Colonial Avenue to the south, New Rochelle to the east, and the Hutchinson River to the west. The Village of North Pelham was incorporated on August 29, 1896. Its boundaries were the New Haven Railroad to the south, New Rochelle to the east and northeast, and the Hutchinson River to the west and northwest. By 1940, the Village of Pelham's population was 1,918 and the Village of North Pelham had a population of 5,046. In June 1975, the Village of North Pelham merged with the existing Village of Pelham.

== Geography ==
According to the United States Census Bureau, the village has a total area of 0.8 square miles (2.1 km^{2}), all land.

== Demographics ==
Historical population
Census	Pop.	Note	%±
1880	218		—
1900	303		—
1910	681		124.8%
1920	1,056		55.1%
1930	2,053		94.4%
1940	1,918		−6.6%
1950	1,843		−3.9%
1960	1,964		6.6%
1970	2,076		5.7%
1980	6,848		229.9%
1990	6,413		−6.4%
2000	6,400		−0.2%
2010	6,910		8.0%
2020	7,326		6.0%
U.S. Decennial Census

As of the census of 2000, there were 6,400 people, 2,287 households, and 1,687 families residing in the village. The population density was 7,785.5 inhabitants per square mile (3,006.0/km^{2}). There were 2,337 housing units at an average density of 2,842.9 units per square mile (1,097.6 units/km^{2}). The racial makeup of the village was 83.22% White, 6.66% Black or African American, 0.09% Native American, 4.95% Asian, 2.47% from other races, and 2.61% from two or more races. Hispanic or Latino of any race were 7.20% of the population.

There were 2,287 households, out of which 39.7% had children under the age of 18 living with them, 58.9% were married couples living together, 11.6% had a female householder with no husband present, and 26.2% were non-families. 20.9% of all households were made up of individuals, and 8.3% had someone living with them who was 65 years of age or older. The average household size was 2.79 and the average family size was 3.30.

In the village, the population was spread out, with 27.7% under the age of 18, 6.0% from 18 to 24, 30.7% from 25 to 44, 23.5% from 45 to 64, and 12.0% who were 65 years of age or older. The median age was 37 years. For every 100 females, there were 92.4 males. For every 100 females age 18 and over, there were 87.0 males.

The median income for a household in the village was $82,430, and the median income for a family was $95,929. Males had a median income of $67,339 versus $41,364 for females. The per capita income for the village was $43,397. About 1.3% of families and 3.3% of the population were below the poverty line, including 4% of those under age 18 and 4% of those age 65 or over.

== Climate ==
Climate data for Pelham, New York
Month	Jan	Feb	Mar	Apr	May	Jun	Jul	Aug	Sep	Oct	Nov	Dec	Year
Record high °F (°C)	73 (23)	75 (24)	86 (30)	96 (36)	97 (36)	99 (37)	104 (40)	102 (39)	101 (38)	89 (32)	82 (28)	77 (25)	104 (40)
Mean daily maximum °F (°C)	39.2 (4.0)	42.9 (6.1)	51.4 (10.8)	62.6 (17.0)	73.8 (23.2)	81.6 (27.6)	86.0 (30.0)	83.9 (28.8)	76.1 (24.5)	65.4 (18.6)	55.1 (12.8)	43.8 (6.6)	63.5 (17.5)
Mean daily minimum °F (°C)	20.1 (−6.6)	22.3 (−5.4)	29.1 (−1.6)	38.4 (3.6)	47.2 (8.4)	56.8 (13.8)	62.3 (16.8)	60.8 (16.0)	53.0 (11.7)	41.2 (5.1)	34.6 (1.4)	25.6 (−3.6)	41.0 (5.0)
Record low °F (°C)	−10 (−23)	−5 (−21)	2 (−17)	17 (−8)	29 (−2)	38 (3)	49 (9)	44 (7)	34 (1)	27 (−3)	12 (−11)	−4 (−20)	−10 (−23)
Average precipitation inches (mm)	3.56 (90)	2.84 (72)	4.07 (103)	4.16 (106)	4.33 (110)	3.44 (87)	4.20 (107)	3.93 (100)	4.37 (111)	3.67 (93)	4.09 (104)	3.80 (97)	46.46 (1,180)
Average snowfall inches (cm)	9.8 (25)	10.9 (28)	6.8 (17)	1.4 (3.6)	.2 (0.51)	0 (0)	0 (0)	0 (0)	0 (0)	.1 (0.25)	.8 (2.0)	8.6 (22)	38.6 (98)
Average rainy days (≥ 0.01 in)	8.5	8.1	9.3	9.8	10.9	9.3	9.0	8.7	7.6	6.7	9.2	9.4	113.4
Source 1: Weatherbase
Source 2: Homefacts (precipitation only) The Weather Channel (extremes)

== Education ==
Pelham Village is within the Pelham Union Free School District. Colonial and Hutchinson elementary schools cover portions of the village. Pelham Middle School and Pelham Memorial High School are the district's middle school and comprehensive high school, respectively.
