= James Stone (executive) =

American business executive (born 1947)

James M. Stone
- Born: November 12, 1947 (age 78); New York City
- Education: Harvard Graduate School of Arts and Sciences (Ph.D. Economics); Harvard University (B.A.)
- Known for: Insurance Commissioner of Massachusetts; Chairman, Commodity Futures Trading Commission; Chairman, Plymouth Rock Assurance Companies
- Political party: Democratic
- Spouse: Cathleen Douglas Stone
- Children: 2

James M. Stone (born November 12, 1947) is an American business executive. Jim Stone is the founder and CEO of Boston-based Plymouth Rock Assurance Group. Stone was a Lecturer in Economics at Harvard University in the early 1970s and then was the Massachusetts Commissioner of Insurance under Governor Michael Dukakis from 1975 to 1979. He was appointed chairman of the Commodity Futures Trading Commission by President Jimmy Carter, and served on the Commission until 1983. He is a fellow of the American Academy of Arts and Sciences and an Honorary Fellow of University College London.

== Early life and education ==
James M. (Jim) Stone was born in New York City in 1947. His father was an attorney and a poet, and his mother, Babette Rosmond, was an author and also the fiction editor of Seventeen magazine. His younger brother is the writer Gene Stone. Stone was educated in the public schools of Pelham, New York, and at Harvard University. In 1969, Stone received his bachelor's degree, graduating with Highest Honors in Economics, and was elected a member to Phi Beta Kappa. His academic work was recognized with the Young Prize for the best undergraduate economics thesis, as well as the Goldsmith Prize for best research paper presented to the Graduate School in Economics. Stone received his Ph.D. in Economics from Harvard in 1973. He was appointed as a lecturer in economics by the Harvard faculty to teach courses on the economics of securities markets.

== Career ==
While teaching at Harvard, Stone consulted in the insurance industry on a part-time basis. During this period, he completed six examinations for admission to the Casualty Actuarial Society (CAS), and his 1973 paper on the insurance of catastrophic risk became a standard requirement of the CAS syllabus.

In 1975, Stone was appointed Insurance Commissioner for the Commonwealth of Massachusetts by Governor Michael S. Dukakis. In 1979, Stone was appointed chairman of the United States Commodity Futures Trading Commission (CFTC) by President Jimmy Carter. Stone’s CFTC tenure was controversial due to his calls for tight position limits, enhanced disclosure, and high margin requirements to reduce excessive leverage in derivative markets. The trading profession and his fellow Commissioners dismissed his assertions that the burgeoning scale of speculative derivatives could prove destabilizing for the economy as a whole. Stone's proposals received a measure of support only after his tenure ended. In the wake of the 2008 financial crisis, Paul Volcker, the Federal Reserve chairman during Stone's time in Washington, D.C., wrote to Stone: "A lot of lessons have not been learned...we are in substantial agreement." Michael Dukakis wrote that, had he been elected president, Stone would have been his Treasury Secretary. President Carter, in his final years, told Stone: "I wasn't focused on your issues then, but you were right." None of Stone's major reform proposals have been adopted to date. In 1983, Stone finished his term in Washington at the CFTC and returned to Boston. In 1982, he founded Plymouth Rock Assurance Corporation. He has been the group's CEO since its establishment.

The Plymouth Rock Assurance Group operates a number of personal lines insurers, specializing in automobile and homeowners coverage in the Northeast United States. It manages over $2.5 billion in annual premiums.

Stone served on the Board of Directors of The Boston Globe Newspaper Corporation from 1998 to 2006, and for five years as vice chairman of GlobalPost, a web-based international news service.

== Authorship ==
Stone is the author of "One Way for Wall Street," a 1979 book on the securities industry, and "Five Easy Theses: Commonsense Solutions to America's Greatest Economic Challenges" (May 2016), a Bloomberg Best Books of 2016 selection. He has also authored articles on insurance, finance, and economics.

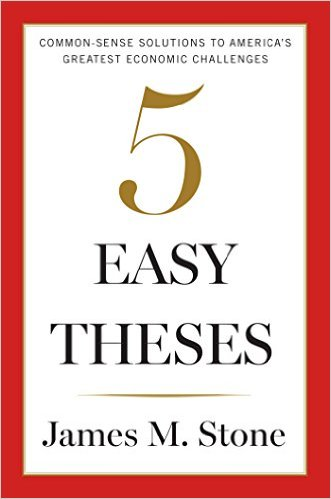
Front Cover of James M. Stone's "Five Easy Theses"

== Philanthropy ==
Stone served for ten years on the Board (and is now Chairman Emeritus) of Management Sciences for Health, an international humanitarian health non-profit. He currently chairs the Education and Commercial Relations Committees of the Board of Directors of Cold Spring Harbor Laboratory, a preeminent genetics and cancer research institute. He is the principal sponsor of the School on the Move prize, which grants a substantial monetary award each year to the most improved Boston public school. He is a member of the Trust of the American Academy of Arts and Sciences. He is also a member of the Board of Directors and Chair of the Investment Committee of ProPublica, a Pulitzer Prize winning non-profit investigative reporting organization.

Stone is the principal donor to thirteen academic programs for the study of wealth and income inequality. These are located at Harvard University; the Harris School of Public Policy at The University of Chicago; City University of New York Graduate Center; Brown University; University of California, Berkeley; University of Michigan; INSEAD; Paris School of Economics; University of British Columbia; University College London; LMU Munich; MIT; and University of Hong Kong. He and his wife have also established the Stone Center for Environmental Stewardship at University of California, Berkeley and the Stone Living Laboratory, based at the University of Massachusetts, Boston and engaged in the study of coastal sustainability in the era of climate change. The Stones created and sponsor the Museum of African-American History Stone Book Prize, which awards a significant stipend each year for the best scholarly book on African American history as chosen by a distinguished panel of academic jurors.

== Personal life ==
Stone is married to Cathleen Douglas Stone, a lawyer and environmentalist and the widow of Supreme Court Justice William O. Douglas. They have twin children, Curtis and Lauren Stone, born in 1995. They live in Boston.
