= Thomas Pell II =

Sir Thomas Pell II

3rd Lord of Pelham Manor
- In office c. 1712–1739
- Preceded by: John Pell
- Succeeded by: Joshua Pell

Personal details
- Born: c. 1686 Pelham Manor, Province of New York
- Died: September 3, 1739 (aged 52–53) Pelham Manor, Province of New York
- Spouse: Anna Wampage (m. 1684; died 1694)
- Relations: John Pell (grandfather)
- Parent(s): John Pell; Rachel Pinckney

Thomas Pell, 3rd Lord of Pelham Manor (c. 1686 – September 3, 1739), was an American landowner who owned Pelham, New York, as well as land that now includes the eastern Bronx and southern Westchester County, New York.

== Early life ==
Pell was born at Pelham Manor, in the Province of New York in 1686. He was the son of John Pell and Rachel (née Pinckney) Pell. Among his siblings were Hannah Ward (née Pell), John Pell, Elizabeth Huestis (née Pell), Mary Pugsley Hunter (née Pell), Phillip Pell, and Ada Pell.

His father was the only son born to Ithamaria (née Reginald) (Note: Pell's grandmother's maiden name is sometimes spelled Reginald or Reginoilles.) Pell and the Rt. Rev. John Pell, D.D., a mathematician and political agent. His grandfather's only brother was Thomas Pell, a physician who was Gentleman of the Bedchamber to Charles I. His mother was the daughter of Jane (née Phippen) Pinckney and Phillip Pinckney II, who first settled in Boston, then Fairfield before buying, with nine other men, a large tract of land called "Ten Farms" on the Hutchinson River.

== Career ==
Pell's grand-uncle had signed a treaty with Chief Wampage, and other Siwanoy Indian tribal members, that granted him 50,000 acres (20,000 ha) of tribal land, including part of the Bronx and land to the west along Long Island Sound in what is now Westchester County, extending west to the Hutchinson River and north to Mamaroneck. In 1666, the land was created into an entire enfranchised township and manor. As his grand-uncle died in 1669 without male heir, his father inherited the entirety of the manor.

Upon his father's death around 1712, Pell inherited the entirety of the manor which he managed and eventually divided amongst his children.

== Personal life ==
Pell was married to married Anna (or Ann), daughter of Ninham-Wampage and granddaughter of Wampage I, Sachem of the Siwanoys, and the former Susanna Cole (daughter of William and Anne Hutchinson, who was killed during Kieft's War). Together, they were the parents of seven sons, issues include:

- Mary Pell (c. 1700–1741), who married Samuel Sands.
- John Pell (1702–1773), who married Mary Totten.
- Joshua Pell (1706–1781), who became the 4th Lord of Pelham Manor and who married Phoebe Palmer, a daughter of John Palmer.
- Ann Pell (b. 1716), who married silversmith Samuel Broadhurst.
- Bersheba Pell (1720–1779), who married Theophilus Bartow.
- Joseph Pell
- Thomas Pell
- Philip Pell
- Caleb Pell

Pell died at the manor house on September 3, 1739. Upon his death, each of his sons, Joseph, John, Thomas, Joshua, Philip, and Caleb Pell, received 10,000 acres (4,000 ha) of land. Eldest son John had six sons, who all died without issue, the last being Richard Moore Pell, who died at the Manor in 1868. The 4th Lords son, Thomas Pell (b. 1744), who married Margaret Bartow, was the last owner of the property, which later passed into the possession of the Bartow family.

== Descendants ==
Through his son Joshua, Pell was a grandfather of Benjamin Pell (c. 1750–1828) and a great-grandfather of horticulturist William Ferris Pell and merchant Alfred Sands Pell.

== See also ==
- Bartow-Pell Mansion
