= Alfred Sands Pell =

American merchant (1786–1831)

Alfred Sands Pell (March 1, 1786 – April 28, 1831) was an American merchant who died at sea in 1831.

== Early life ==
Pell was born in New York on March 1, 1786. He was the second son of the Quaker lumber and shipping merchant Benjamin Pell (c. 1750–1828) and Marianna (née Ferris) Pell (1757-1795), who married in 1778. Among his siblings were William Ferris Pell (husband of Mary Shipley); Gilbert Titus Pell (husband of Elizabeth Birkbeck, a daughter of Morris Birkbeck, and father of Morris Birkbeck Pell), a representative in the Illinois Legislature, later appointed United States envoy to Mexico in the 1850s; and Maria Pell (wife of Jacob T. Walden). His family were among the largest landowners along the Hudson River.

His paternal grandparents were Joshua Pell (son of Thomas Pell, 3rd Lord of Pelham Manor and grandson of Sir John Pell, 2nd Lord of Pelham Manor) and Phoebe (née Palmer) Pell (daughter of John Palmer). His maternal grandparents were John Ferris and Marianna (née Hunt) Ferris. His great-great grandfather, Lt Col John Pell (styled “Sir”) married Rachel Pinckney and was the nephew of the 1st Lord, Thomas Pell. In 1654, Thomas Pell signed a treaty with Chief Wampage and other Siwanoy Indian tribal members that granted him 50,000 acres (20,000 ha) of tribal land, including all or part of what is now The Bronx, and land to the west along Long Island Sound in what is now Westchester County, extending west to the Hutchinson River and north to Mamaroneck.

== Career ==
Pell followed in his father's footsteps and became wealthy as a merchant with the family firm of Pells & Co., importers of mahogany and marble, an auction house, and, lastly, financiers.

In 1827, Pell purchased a 114-acre estate in Esopus on the Hudson River, just north of Esopus Island, from John Johnston Cameron and at the same time a 143-acre tract on the Hudson at the northern end of what is now West Park. Upon his death, his eldest son Robert Livingston Pell inherited these estates.

== Personal life ==
Pell was married to Adelia Duane (1765–1860), a daughter of Mary (née Livingston) Duane (the eldest surviving daughter of Robert Livingston, 3rd Lord of Livingston Manor) and James Duane, a signer of the Articles of Confederation, first post-colonial Mayor of New York City, and first Judge of the United States District Court for the District of New York. Adelia's sister, Mary Duane, was the wife of Gen. William North, and another sister, Sarah Duane, was the wife of geologist and geographer George William Featherstonhaugh. Together, Adelia and Alfred were the parents of:

- Robert Livingston Pell (1811–1880), who married Maria Louisa Brinckerhoff, a daughter of James Lefferts Brinckerhoff and granddaughter of Robert Troup, in 1837.
- James Duane Pell (1813–1881), who married his cousin, Sophia Gertrude (1815–1885), daughter of William Ferris Pell, in 1838.
- John Augustus Pell (1816–1894), who married Susan Marie Field (1827–1893).
- George Washington Pell (1820–1896), American Consul to the Rhenish provinces, who married Mary Bruen (d. 1890).
- Richard Montgomery Pell (1822–1882), who married Frances Mary Jones (1839–1930), a daughter of Samuel T. Jones. After his death, she married Louis Thurston Hoyt, the eldest son of Jesse Hoyt.

Pell died at sea on April 28, 1831, and was buried at Green-Wood Cemetery in Brooklyn. His widow died in 1860.

=== Legacy ===
Pell Street in present-day Chinatown, Manhattan, was named for the lane which ran to Joshua Pell’s farm and abattoir.
