= Morris Robinson (businessman) =

American business executive

President of the Mutual Life Insurance Company of New York
- In office 1842–1849
- Preceded by: Position established
- Succeeded by: Joseph B. Collins

Personal details
- Born: Morris Robinson; September 2, 1784
- Died: May 5, 1849 (aged 64) New York City, New York
- Spouse: Henrietta Elizabeth Duer (m. 1813; died 1839)
- Relations: Beverley Robinson (grandfather); Susanna Philipse (grandmother); Ranald Slidell Mackenzie (grandson); Alexander Slidell MacKenzie (grandson); Frederick Philipse Robinson (uncle); Thomas Henry Barclay (uncle)
- Parent(s): Beverly Robinson; Anna Dorothea Barclay

Morris Robinson (September 2, 1784 – May 5, 1849) was an American businessman from a family of prominent Loyalists; Robinson was a founder and the first president of the Mutual Life Insurance Company of New York.

== Early life ==
Robinson was born on September 2, 1784. He was a son of Lt.-Col. Beverly Robinson, a United Empire Loyalists in Nova Scotia, and Anna Dorothea Barclay. Among his siblings were elder brother, Beverley Robinson, who married Frances Duer (and elder sister of Morris' wife Henrietta), and Roxanne Robinson, who married Joseph T. Mabie.

His paternal grandparents were merchant Beverley Robinson and Susanna Philipse (the eldest surviving daughter of Frederick Philipse II, 2nd Lord of Philipsburg Manor). Among his large extended family was uncle Sir Frederick Philipse Robinson, a prominent Loyalist. His maternal grandparents were the Rev. Henry Barclay, rector of Trinity Church, and Mary Rutgers Barclay. His uncle was Thomas Henry Barclay, Speaker of the House of Assembly of Nova Scotia.

== Career ==
In 1841, Robinson and Alfred Shipley Pell, (Note: Alfred Shipley Pell was a nephew of William Ferris Pell, and a first cousin of Lt.-Gov. Duncan Pell and Robert Livingston Pell, all descendants of Thomas Pell, 1st Lord of the Pelham Manor.) who had worked for the Mutual Safety Insurance Company, decided to form a life insurance company with Robinson as president. They received a charter for the Mutual Life Insurance Company of New York from the state of New York for The Mutual Life Insurance Company of New York on April 12, 1842, and opened the doors for business less than a year later on February 1, 1843. Robinson served as president of Mutual Life until his death in May 1849 after which he was succeeded by Joseph B. Collins.

== Personal life ==
On December 1, 1813, Robinson was married to Henrietta Elizabeth Duer (1790–1839), a daughter of Continental Congressman William Duer and Lady Catherine Alexander Duer (a daughter of Sarah (née Livingston) Alexander and William Alexander, Lord Stirling). Among her siblings were Justice William Alexander Duer and jurist John Duer. Together, they were the parents of:

- Catherine Alexander Robinson (b. 1814), who married Alexander Slidell-Mackenzie, son of bank president John Slidell and brother of U.S. Senator John Slidell and Jane Slidell (wife of Commodore Matthew C. Perry), in 1835.
- Henry Barclay Robinson (b. 1816), who married Cather Elizabeth Hudson, daughter of Joseph Hudson, in 1845. After her death in 1846, he married Maria Antoinette Winthrop, a daughter of Thomas C. Winthrop, Esq. in 1855.
- Susan Phillipse Robinson (b. 1818), who married Dr. George M. Odell in 1862.
- Frances Duer Robinson (1822), who married Edward Jones in 1841.
- Harriet Duer Robinson (b. 1828), who married Albert Gallatin II, son of James Gallatin (president of the Gallatin National Bank) and grandson of Albert Gallatin (the 4th U.S. Secretary of the Treasury who served as the U.S. Ambassador to the United Kingdom and France), in 1849.

His wife Henrietta died in 1839. Robinson died in New York City on May 5, 1849, and his funeral was held at St. Thomas Church.

=== Descendants ===
Through his eldest daughter, he was a grandfather of Gen. Ranald Slidell Mackenzie (1840–1889) and Lt.-Com. Alexander Slidell MacKenzie (1842–1867).
