= William Ferris Pell =

American horticulturist

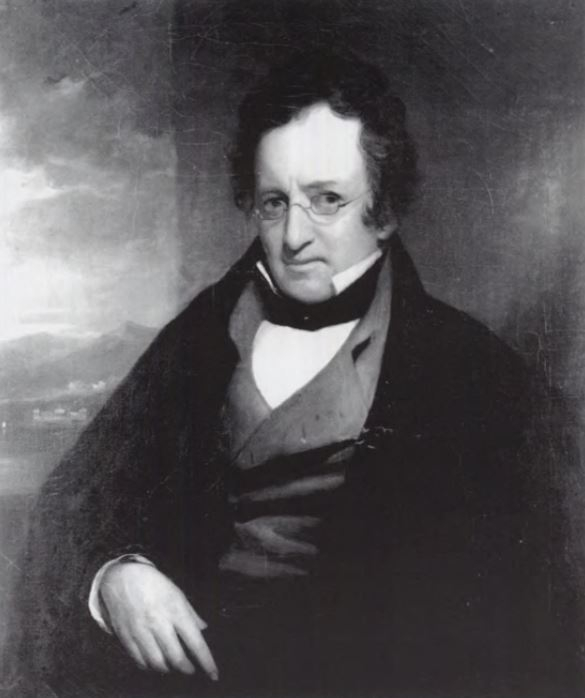
- Portrait of Pell by Daniel Huntington, 1838
- Born: September 1779; Westchester County, New York, U.S.
- Died: October 28, 1840 (aged 61); New York City, New York, U.S.
- Education: Columbia College
- Spouse: Mary Shipley (m. 1802)
- Children: 11, including Alfred, Duncan
- Parent(s): Benjamin Pell; Marianna Ferris Pell
- Relatives: Robert Livingston Pell (nephew); Stephen Hyatt Pell (great-grandson); Herbert Pell (great-grandson); Theodore Pell (great-grandson)

William Ferris Pell (September 1779 – October 28, 1840) was an American horticulturist.

== Early life ==
Pell was born in New York in September 1779. He was the son of shipping merchant Benjamin Pell (c. 1750–1828) and Marianna (née Ferris) Pell (1757–1795), who married in 1778. Among his siblings were Alfred Sands Pell (husband of Adelia Duane, a daughter of James Duane, and father of Robert Livingston Pell); Gilbert Titus Pell (husband of Elizabeth Birkbeck, a daughter of Morris Birkbeck, and father of Morris Birkbeck Pell), and representative in the Illinois Legislature, who was appointed United States envoy to Mexico in the 1850s; and Maria Pell (wife of Jacob T. Walden).

His paternal grandparents were Joshua Pell (son of Thomas Pell, 3rd Lord of Pelham Manor and grandson of Sir John Pell, 2nd Lord of Pelham Manor) and Phoebe (née Palmer) Pell (daughter of John Palmer). His great-great-grandfather, Sir John Pell was the nephew of the 1st Lord, Thomas Pell, who acquired Pelham Manor from the Siwanoy Indians in 1645. His maternal grandparents were John Ferris and Marianna (née Hunt) Ferris.

Pell studied botany at Columbia College under Dr. David Hosack, a well-known botanist and horticulturalist who founded Elgin Botanic Garden in 1801.

== Career ==
Pell worked in the family business Pell & Co., which imported mahogany and marble before becoming an auction house that later went into financing.

=== Fort Ticonderoga ===
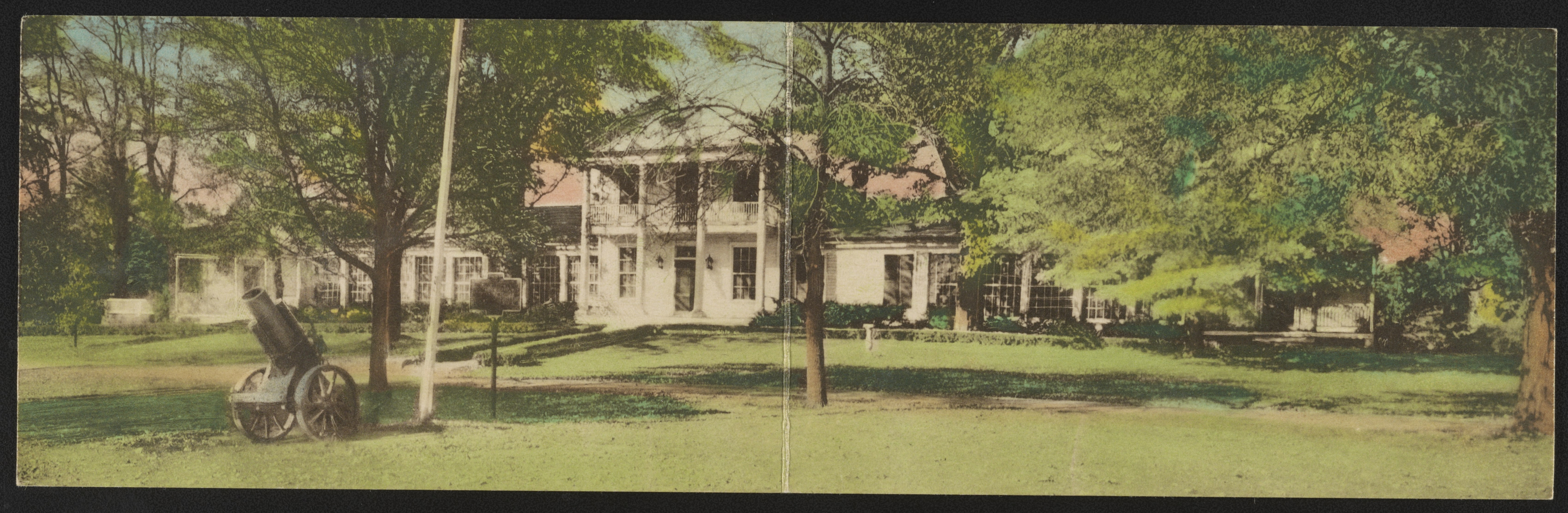
The Pavilion, 1900.

During a steamboat trip to Burlington, Vermont, Pell spotted the ruins of Fort Ticonderoga on Lake Champlain. In 1816, he began leasing the property from Columbia and Union colleges (whom had received the property from the state of New York in 1803), and in 1820, he purchased the entire 546-acre grounds for $6,008. Pell preserved the remaining stonework of the Fort and built a home known as Beaumont, which burnt down in 1825. In 1826, he built a Palladian-style country estate which he named Pavilion. The home was later converted into a hotel to serve the tourist trade. The Pell family later hired English architect Alfred Bossom to restore the fort, which was formally opened to the public in 1909 as an historic site.

== Personal life ==
On November 11, 1802, Pell was married to Mary Shipley (d. 1848), the daughter of Morris Shipley of London. Together, they were the parents of:

- Archibald Morris Pell (1803–1839), who married Catherine Elizabeth Rutgers, a daughter of Nicholas Gouverneur Rutgers and Cornelia (née Livingston) Rutgers (Note: Cornelia Livingston Rutgers (1776–1825) was the daughter of John Livingston (1750–1822) and Maria Ann Leroy (1759–1797). Her grandfather, Robert Livingston was the 3rd Lord of Livingston Manor.) (and an aunt to Louisa Barnewall Van Rensselaer). He was accidentally killed in 1839 when firing a cannon saluting the elder Pell's arrival at Pavilion.
- Alfred Shipley Pell (1805–1869), who married Elizabeth Cruger. After her death, he married Eliza Wood (daughter of John Wood).
- Duncan Campbell Pell (1807–1874), the Lieutenant Governor of Rhode Island who married Anna Clarke, daughter of George Hyde Clarke.
- Walden Pell (1808–1863), who married Orleanna R. Ellery and died in Havana, Cuba.
- Morris Shipley Pell (1810–1881), who married Mary Rodman Howland (1810–1892), a daughter of John Hicks Howland and Sarah (née Hazard) Howland, in 1830.
- Ecroyde Pell (1811–1832), who died unmarried.
- Mary Pell (1813–1884), who married Capt. Francis S. Haggerty (d. 1899).
- Sophia Gertrude Pell (1815–1885), who married her cousin, James Duane Pell, a son of Alfred Sands Pell.
- Emma Pell (1817–1875), who died unmarried.
- James Kent Pell (1819–1874), who died unmarried.
- Clarence Pell (1820–1865), who married Annie Claiborne (1813–c. 1916).

In 1838, Daniel Huntington painted a portrait of Pell, which is in the collection of the Fort Ticonderoga Museum today.

Pell died on October 28, 1840, and was buried at Saint Paul's Church Cemetery in Mount Vernon, New York. His widow died on October 3, 1848.

=== Descendants ===
Through his son Morris, he was a grandfather of John Howland Pell (1830–1882), father of, among others, Stephen Hyatt Pell (who spearheaded the restoration of Fort Ticonderoga, founded the Fort Ticonderoga Association in 1931) and Theodore Roosevelt Pell (champion tennis player), and William Howland Pell (1833–1911).

Through his youngest son Clarence, he was a grandfather of Herbert Claiborne Pell (1853–1926), who married Katherine Lorillard Kernochan. (Note: Katherine Lorillard (née Kernochan) Pell (1858–1917) was the daughter of James Powell Kernochan and Catherine (née Lorillard) Kernochan and granddaughter of Pierre Lorillard III.) They were the parents of Clarence Cecil Pell (1885–1964) and Herbert Claiborne Pell Jr., a U.S. Representative and U.S. Ambassador to Hungary and Portugal, himself the father of Claiborne Pell, the U.S. Senator from Rhode Island.
