= Howard Melville Hanna =

American businessman (1840–1921)

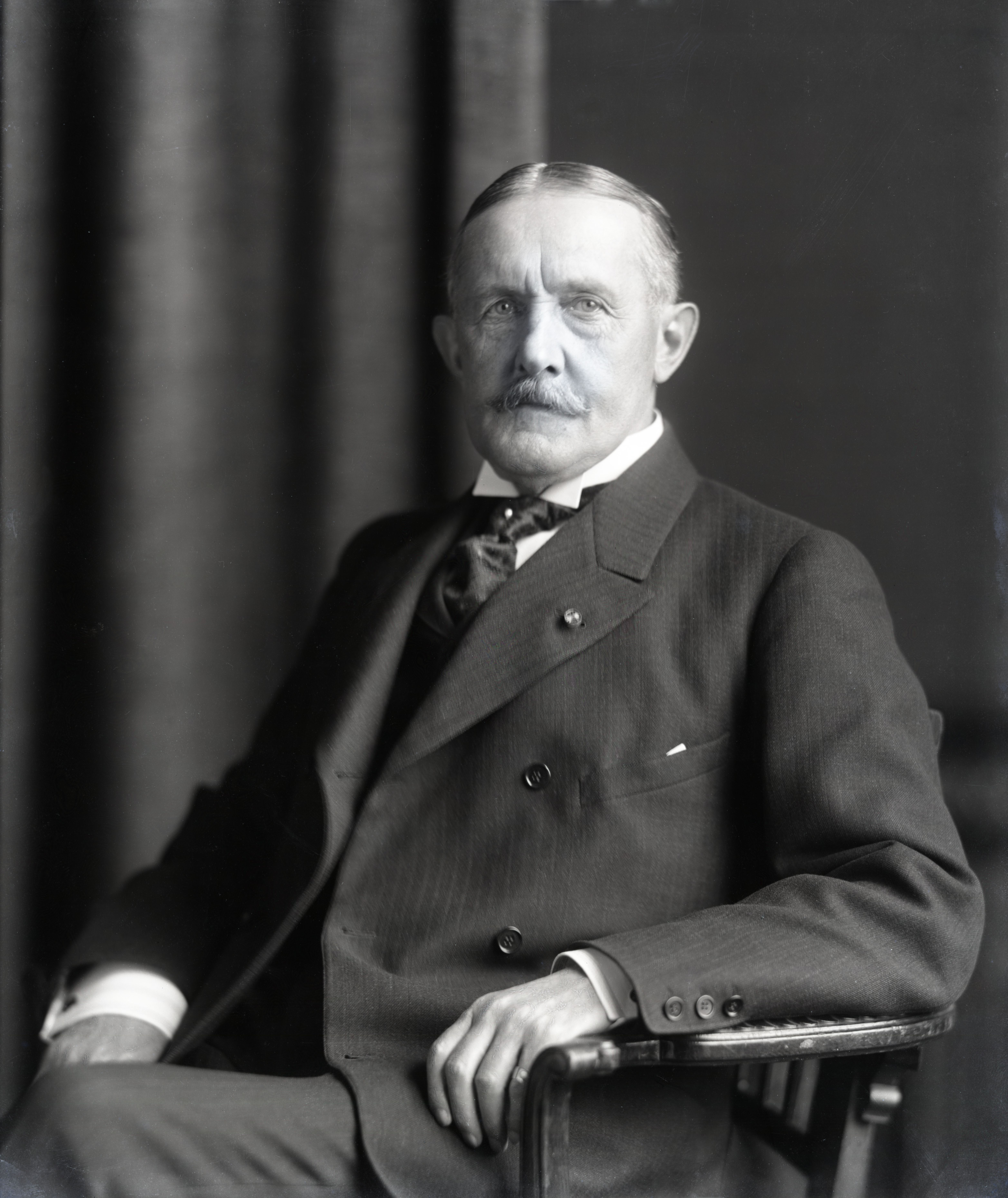
- Born: January 23, 1840; New Lisbon, Ohio, U.S.
- Died: February 8, 1921 (aged 81); Thomasville, Georgia, U.S.
- Burial place: Lake View Cemetery
- Education: Union College
- Occupation: Businessman
- Spouse: Kate Smith (m. 1863; died 1919)
- Children: 6
- Relatives: Mark Hanna (brother)

Howard Melville Hanna (January 23, 1840 – February 8, 1921) was an American Civil War veteran, businessman in shipping and iron ore, philanthropist and owner of Pebble Hill Plantation in Thomasville, Georgia.

== Early life ==
Howard Melville Hanna was born on January 23, 1840, in New Lisbon, Ohio. His older brother Mark Hanna served as Republican United States Senator from Ohio from 1897 to 1904 and was the owner of the M. A. Hanna Company. He moved to Cleveland, Ohio with his family at the age of twelve.

In Cleveland, he was a schoolmate of John D. Rockefeller, who became a lifelong friend. Hanna graduated from Union College in Schenectady, New York.

== Career ==
Hanna served in the American Civil War of 1861 to 1865. On June 11, 1862, he became Paymaster of the Union Navy. He served on USS Agawam from March 9, 1864, until he resigned and was discharged on February 13, 1865.

=== Business career ===
After the Civil War, Hanna invested in shipping and later in the oil business after the death of his brother-in-law, H. M. Chapin. He then went into partnership with his sister and operated a refinery known as Hanna, Chapin & Co., which was eventually sold to the Standard Oil of Ohio. He later invested in the American Ship Building Company, the dominant shipbuilder on the Great Lakes before the Second World War. A harness racer, Hanna was one of the original stockholders of the Glenville Race Track, a race track in Cleveland.

=== Philanthropy ===
A philanthropist, Hanna was President of the Charity Organization Society in Cleveland. He also donated to the Lakeside Hospital and to the Western Reserve University. Additionally, he was a member of the Western Reserve Historical Society.

== Personal life ==
On December 28, 1863, Hanna was married to Kate Smith (1843-1919), the daughter of Jason B. Woodward and Catherine Reed (née Brightman) Woodward. After her father's death in 1844 shortly after her birth, Kate was adopted by her paternal aunt, sister Mary Ann Woodward and her husband Erastus Smith of Hartford, Connecticut. Together, Kate and Howard were the parents of six children, including:

- Helen Hanna (1864–1864), who died in infancy.
- Bessie Hanna (1865–1865), who died in infancy.
- Mary Gertrude Hanna (1866–1945), who married Coburn Haskell, the inventor of the modern golf ball.
- Kate Benedict Hanna (1871–1936), who married Robert Livingston Ireland, a son of John Busteed Ireland and grandson of Robert Livingston Pell, in 1894. They divorced and she remarried to Perry Williams Harvey.
- Howard Melville Hanna Jr. (1877–1945), who married his cousin Jean Claire Hanna, daughter of Leonard Converse Hanna. Was president of Detroit Iron & Steel Co.
- Leonard Hanna (1881–1881), who died in infancy.

They purchased the Pebble Hill Plantation in Thomasville, Georgia in 1896, where they wintered. They also purchased the Winnstead Plantation and the Melrose Plantation in Thomasville.

Hanna died on February 8, 1921, in Thomasville. He was buried at Lake View Cemetery in Cleveland. At his death, he left an estate valued at $11,351,011, which was divided between his three surviving children.
