= Alfred Pell =

Alfred Pell may refer to:

- Alfred Shipley Pell (1805–1869), American insurance executive
- Alfred Sands Pell (1786–1831), American merchant
