= Morris Robinson (disambiguation) =

Morris Robinson may refer to:

- Morris Robinson (born 1969), American opera singer and former college football player
- Morris Robinson (businessman) (1784–1849), American businessman who co-founded Mutual Life Insurance Company of New York
- Morris Robinson, 3rd Baron Rokeby (1757–1829), British politician
