= John Busteed Ireland =

American lawyer and writer (1823–1913)

- Born: September 6, 1823; Watkins Glen, New York, U.S.
- Died: October 11, 1913 (aged 90); Manhattan, New York, U.S.
- Education: New York University
- Spouse: Adelia Duane Pell (m. 1863; death 1913)
- Children: 7
- Parent(s): John Lawrence Ireland; Mary Floyd Ireland
- Relatives: John G. Floyd (uncle)

John Busteed Ireland (September 6, 1823 – October 11, 1913) was an American lawyer, writer, and landowner.

== Early life ==
Ireland was born in Watkins Glen, Schuyler County, New York on September 6, 1823. He was the son of John Lawrence Ireland (1796–1879) and Mary (née Floyd) Ireland (1798–1887), the sister of U.S. Representative John Gelston Floyd. John's younger brother was Nicoll Floyd Ireland.

His paternal grandparents were John Ireland and Judith (née Lawrence) Ireland (a daughter of New York State Senator Jonathan Lawrence and the former Ruth Riker, a member of the Riker family, for whom Rikers Island is named). Among his great-uncles were U.S. Representative Samuel Lawrence, New York City Comptroller John L. Lawrence, and U.S. Representative William T. Lawrence. His maternal grandparents were Nicoll Floyd (eldest son of Gen. William Floyd, a signer of the United States Declaration of Independence) and Phoebe (née Gelston) Floyd (a daughter of David Gelston, the Collector of the Port of New York under Presidents Jefferson, Madison and Monroe).

As a child, his family moved from Watkins Glen to New York City to live. Ireland graduated from New York University in 1842.

== Career ==
After three years study, Ireland was admitted to the bar in Albany in 1845. Ireland, who inherited great wealth from his father, made a six-year tour of the world, beginning in 1851. After returning, he wrote a book entitled: Wall Street to Cashmere: A Journal of Five Years in Asia, Africa, and Europe; Comprising Visits, during 1851, 2, 3, 4, 5, 6 to the Danemora Iron Mines, the 'Seven Churches', plains of Troy, Palmyra, Jerusalem, Petra, Seringpatam, Surat; With Scenes of the Recent Mutinies (Benares, Agra, Cawnpore, Luchnow, Delhi, etc. etc.), Cashmere, the Khyber Pass to Afghanistan, Java, China, and Mauritius. Also upon his return, he devoted much of his time to managing his real estate interests.

In 1859, he became a member of the Union League Club, of which he was the longest member immediately preceding his death in 1913. He was also a member of the Sons of the Revolution, the Saint Nicholas Society of the City of New York and Church Club.

== Personal life ==
In 1863, Ireland was married to Adelia Duane Pell (1838–1915). Adelia was the only daughter of Robert Livingston Pell and Maria Louisa (née Brinckerhoff) Pell. Through her mother, she was a direct descendant of Judge Robert Troup and Peter Goelet, and through her father, she was a direct descendant of James Duane (the Mayor of New York City), Robert Livingston, 3rd Lord of Livingston Manor, and Thomas Pell, 1st Lord of the Pelham Manor (and a Gentleman of the Bedchamber to Charles I). Together, Adelia and John were the parents of four sons and three daughters:

- John DeCourcy Ireland (1865–1951), a Yale graduate who married Elizabeth Gallatin (1874–1895), a great-granddaughter of Albert Gallatin, in 1895. He later married Arline Elizabeth Davis (1868–1963).
- Robert Livingston Ireland Sr. (1867–1928), who married Kate Benedict Hanna, daughter of Howard Melville Hanna and heiress to the M. A. Hanna Company fortune.
- Maria Louise Ireland (1870–1965), who married the Rev. Easton Earl Madeira.
- Adelia Ireland (1872–1936), who married Dr. Montgomery H. Sicard, who was connected with the marine division of Standard Oil of New Jersey.
- Augustus Floyd Ireland (1874–1906)
- Laura Duane Ireland (1877–1960), who married Louis Henri Junod, Consul General of Switzerland to the United States in 1898.
- James Duane Ireland Sr. (1878–1921), who married Elizabeth Clark Ring, daughter of Clark Lombard Ring of Saginaw, Michigan.

Ireland died of apoplexy on October 11, 1913, at his home, 104 East 73rd Street in Manhattan. After a funeral service at the Church of the Heavenly Rest, he was buried in the Ireland family vault at Trinity Churchyard in Manhattan. His eldest son John went bankrupt in April 1917.

=== Descendants ===
Through his son John, he was grandfather of Louise Davis Ireland (1905-2001), co-author of "Children in the Family, a Psychological Guide for Parents" with Florence Powdermaker, and "Ligi-A Life in the Twentieth Century". She married Charles P. Grimes. He was great grandfather of Louise son, Charles Livingston Grimes, an Olympic gold medalist in rowing.

Through his son Robert, he was a grandfather of Robert Livingston Ireland Jr. (1895–1981), Vice Chairman of Consolidation Coal, philanthropist, plantation owner, quail hunter and yachtsman.

Through his daughter Laura, he was a grandfather to Henri Pell Junod (1900–1971), a graduate of the Massachusetts Institute of Technology who became an industrialist and served as executive vice president and vice chairman of Pickands Mather & Co., Inc.
