= Clay Pell =

American lawyer, military officer, and politician

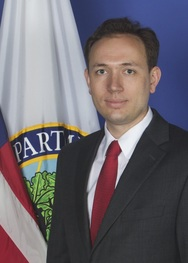

Personal details
- Born: Herbert Claiborne Pell IV; November 17, 1981 (age 44) Tucson, Arizona, U.S.
- Party: Democratic
- Spouse: Michelle Kwan (m. 2013; div. 2017)
- Education: Harvard University (BA); Georgetown University (JD); Stanford University (MBA)

Military service
- Allegiance: United States
- Branch/service: United States Coast Guard
- Years of service: 2009–2011 (active); 2011–present (reserve)
- Rank: Commander
- Unit: Southeastern New England; United States Coast Guard Reserve

Herbert Claiborne Pell IV (born November 17, 1981) is an American lawyer, military officer, and politician. He is a commander and judge advocate in the United States Coast Guard Reserve, and served as the Deputy Assistant Secretary for International and Foreign Language Education in the United States Department of Education. He is the grandson of the late Senator Claiborne Pell. Pell ran for the 2014 Democratic Party nomination for Governor of Rhode Island in a competitive three-way race ultimately won by Rhode Island State Treasurer Gina Raimondo.

As of June 2025, Pell is a judge to the United States Coast Guard Court of Criminal Appeals.

== Early life and education ==
Pell is the grandson of Senator Claiborne Pell and Nuala Pell (a great-granddaughter of A&P grocery chain founder George Huntington Hartford and granddaughter of his son Edward V. Hartford). Through his grandfather, he is a direct descendant of Wampage I, a Siwanoy chieftain.

Pell attended The Thacher School and graduated in 2000. He also attended the School Year Abroad (SYA) in Zaragoza, Spain (1999) and Beijing, China (2001). He graduated from Harvard College in 2005 with high honors and a bachelor's degree in social studies. Pell also received a Citation in Modern Standard Arabic from Harvard. Pell went on to graduate from Georgetown University Law Center with a J.D. in 2008.

== Career ==
In 2009, Pell joined the United States Coast Guard and graduated first in his class from the Coast Guard Direct Commission Officer School. He served on active duty as a judge advocate from 2009 to 2011. He currently is a commander and judge advocate in the United States Coast Guard Reserve.

Pell served as Director for Strategic Planning on the National Security Staff, and was a White House Fellow from 2011 to 2012.

In 2013, Pell served as Deputy Assistant Secretary of the Office of International and Foreign Language Education at the United States Department of Education. His support for language education and cultural proficiency was recognized by the Northeast Conference on the Teaching of Foreign Languages which presented him with its Advocacy Award in 2014—an award Pell's grandfather received in 1988.

On January 27, 2014, Pell confirmed he would run for Governor of Rhode Island in the 2014 election His then-wife, Michelle Kwan, appeared in TV ads on his behalf to garner support among female voters before the September 9, 2014, primary. Pell placed third in the Democratic primary, which was won by Gina Raimondo.

In 2016, Pell was elected as a presidential elector from Rhode Island and served as President of the Rhode Island Electoral College.

In 2020, Stanford University awarded Pell the Sloan Fellowship at its Graduate School of Business.

== Personal life ==
In January 2013, Pell married five-time world figure skating champion and two-time Olympic medalist Michelle Kwan. The two first met in April 2011. In 2017, Pell announced in a statement that he had filed for divorce from Kwan.

Pell speaks English, Spanish, Mandarin Chinese, Arabic, and some Russian.

In 2005, Pell was elected as a member of the Rhode Island Society of the Cincinnati by right of his descent from Surgeon's Mate John Wilkins, Jr. of the First Regiment of the Pennsylvania Continental Line.
