= Zvonko Bušić =

Croatian hijacker (1946–2013)

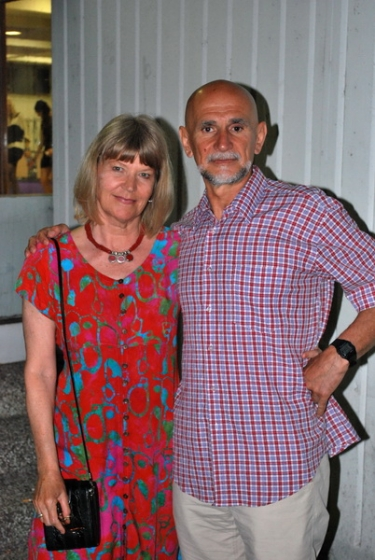
- Zvonko and his wife Julienne Bušić (2009)
- Born: 23 January 1946; Gorica, PR Bosnia and Herzegovina
- Died: 1 September 2013 (aged 67); Rovanjska, Zadar County, Croatia
- Organization: Croatian National Resistance
- Known for: TWA Flight 355 hijacking
- Spouse: Julienne Bušić (m. 1972)
- Convictions: Aircraft piracy resulting in death (49 U.S.C. § 46502); Conspiracy to commit aircraft piracy (49 U.S.C. § 46502)
- Penalty: Life imprisonment

Zvonko Bušić (23 January 1946 – 1 September 2013) was a Croatian responsible for hijacking TWA Flight 355 in September 1976. He was subsequently convicted of air piracy and spent 32 years in prison in the United States before being released on parole and deported in July 2008.

== Background ==
Zvonko Bušić was born in 1946 in Gorica, FS Bosnia and Herzegovina, DF Yugoslavia. He finished gymnasium in Imotski, graduating in Zagreb, and emigrated to Vienna in 1966 to pursue history and Slavic studies at university. There, in 1969, he met an American student, Julienne Eden Schultz, who was studying German and thereafter became involved in Bušić's political activities. The couple and a friend traveled to Zagreb and threw anti-Yugoslav leaflets from the Ilica skyscraper on Republic Square (now Ban Jelačić Square), after which they were arrested and imprisoned. After her release, Julienne returned to Vienna and in 1972, Julienne and Zvonko married in Frankfurt, and later relocated to the United States.

== Hijacking ==
On 10 September 1976, Zvonko and his wife, Julienne, along with Petar Matanić and Frane Pešut, hijacked a commercial Trans World Airlines plane, Boeing 727, Flight 355, heading from New York to Chicago. The mastermind of the hijacking, Zvonko Bušić, delivered a note to the captain in which he informed him that the airplane was hijacked, that the group had five gelignite bombs on board, and that another bomb was planted in a locker across from The Commodore Hotel in New York with further instructions.

The alleged gelignite bombs on board were actually pressure cookers. The principal demand in the locker was that certain propaganda would have to appear in the next day morning's edition of several major American newspapers. If the instructions were followed, the bomb would be deactivated. The device at Grand Central Terminal was found and taken to NYPD Rodman's Neck Firing Range where police attempted to dismantle it rather than detonate it. After setting a cutting instrument on the two wires attached to the device, the officers retreated from the pit for several minutes. They then returned to the pit to continue dismantling the device when it exploded and killed an officer, Brian Murray, and wounded another. Meanwhile, the hijacked plane headed for Paris. Thirty passengers were released at a refueling stop in Newfoundland. In Paris, after receiving information that their demands were met, the group surrendered to the French police, which transferred the group to the custody of the Federal Bureau of Investigation.

== Trial and imprisonment ==
Zvonko and Julienne Bušić were charged with and convicted of conspiracy air piracy resulting in death, which carried a mandatory life sentence with parole eligibility after 10 years. Three years after the trial, Judge John R. Bartels reduced the sentence, which made both Zvonko and Julienne eligible for parole by the end of 1979. In 1987, Zvonko escaped from prison. On the morning of the second day following his escape, he was resting on the back porch of a store in Milford, Pennsylvania, prompting the two employees opening the store to contact the police. After being approached by a police officer, Zvonko admitted to his fugitive status and surrendered.

On 13 June 1989, Bartels wrote a letter on Zvonko Bušić's behalf to the U.S. Parole Commission, in which he stated that the death of the police officer was partly due to the police's negligence and that he had no objection to Bušić's release. He served a total of 32 years, 19 years longer than his wife.

Kathleen Murray Moran, the widow of Brian Murray (the policeman killed by Bušić's bomb), filed a lawsuit against the responsible police bodies for "gross negligence". In the suit she stated that the police supervisor placed the officers under his command at unnecessary risk by attempting to disassemble the device while ignoring safety procedures, rather than simply detonating it remotely.

The U.S. State Department continued to support Bušić's incarceration after Croatia gained its independence in 1991. At a Croatian Parliament session in 2002, a resolution was passed to request the transfer of Zvonko Bušić to Croatia, which was forwarded to the Council of Europe. His request for parole was denied in 2006, after serving 30 years, although the others in the group had already been free for at least 17 years. Julienne Bušić was released in 1989. After this denial of parole, the International Helsinki Federation for Human Rights, through its Croatian branch, the Croatian Helsinki Committee, launched a campaign to secure his release on humanitarian grounds, arguing that Bušić had served out his sentence and should be released.

Bušić spent his last two years of imprisonment at the Communications Management Unit (CMU) in Terre Haute, Indiana, transferred from Allenwood, Pennsylvania. He was granted parole in July 2008 and turned himself in to immigration authorities for deportation. A condition of his parole was that he could not return to the United States.

Along with several other groups, including the PLO, the F.A.L.N., the Jewish Defense League, and most recently the FBI and the Yugoslav State Security Administration (UDBA or UDSA), Bušić was considered as a person of interest in the 1975 LaGuardia Airport bombing, which killed 11 people. However, he was never arrested or charged in relation to this crime, denied any involvement, and cooperated with authorities.

== Death ==
Bušić committed suicide at the age of 67 on 1 September 2013 by gunshot at his home in Rovanjska near Zadar; he was discovered by his wife. Thousands came to his burial in the Alley of the Defenders on the Mirogoj cemetery in Zagreb. In his suicide note, Bušić said he had been disillusioned upon his return to an independent Croatia:

"I am sorry but I cannot stand the Plato's cave anymore…Goodbye friends, goodbye relatives, goodbye all good Croats. Forgive me for everything, stay true to our original Croatia and protect our homeland Croatia."

== Legacy ==
His prisoner number, 03941158, was worn by Marko Perković Thompson at his 5 July 2025 concert to honour Bušić's actions.

== Family ==
- widow Julienne Bušić, writer
- sister Zdravka Bušić, former MEP (2013–14), state secretary in the Ministry of Foreign Affairs of Croatia.
- relative Bruno Bušić
