= William Todd Schultz =

William Todd Schultz (born c. 1969) is an American writer specializing in biographies and psychobiographies of artists, based in Portland, Oregon. Schultz received a BA in Philosophy and Psychology from Lewis and Clark College in 1985, an MA in Personality Psychology from the University of California in 1987, and a PhD in Personality Psychology from the University of California in 1993.

Schultz's first psychobiographical subject was James Agee. Other early articles focused on Ludwig Wittgenstein, Jack Kerouac, Roald Dahl, Franz Kafka, and Oscar Wilde. In 2005, Schultz conceived and edited Oxford's Handbook of Psychobiography. He curates Oxford's "Inner Lives" series, consisting of personality profiles of provocative artists and historical figures.

Schultz has published three books, all on artists: Tiny Terror: Why Truman Capote (Almost) Wrote Answered Prayers (2011); An Emergency in Slow Motion: The Inner Life of Diane Arbus (2011); and Torment Saint: The Life of Elliott Smith (2013).

In 2015, Schultz was awarded the Erik Erikson Prize for Excellence in Mental Health Media.

== See also ==
- Julienne Bušić, Schultz's sister
