= Julienne Bušić =

American writer and co-conspirator of Zvonko Bušić (1948–2026)

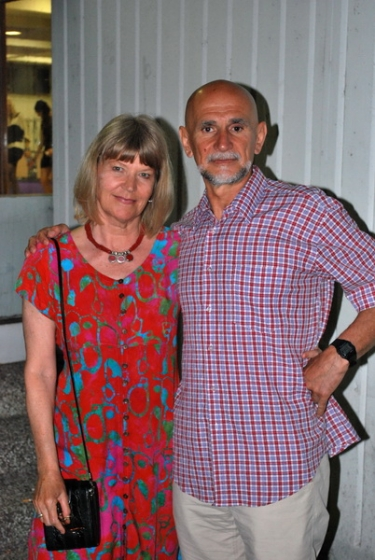
- Julienne Bušić and her husband Zvonko in 2009
- Born: Julienne Eden Schultz; September 20, 1948; Eugene, Oregon, U.S.
- Died: May 21, 2026 (aged 77); Zagreb, Croatia
- Organization: Croatian National Resistance
- Known for: TWA Flight 355 hijacking
- Spouse: Zvonko Bušić (m. 1972; died 2013)
- Status: Paroled
- Convictions: Aircraft piracy resulting in death (49 U.S.C. § 46502); Conspiracy to commit aircraft piracy (49 U.S.C. § 46502)
- Penalty: Life imprisonment

Julienne Eden Bušić (pronounced [bûʃitɕ]; née Schultz; September 20, 1948 – May 21, 2026) was an American writer, activist, and the wife and co-conspirator of Zvonko Bušić. She was arrested with Bušić in 1976 after hijacking TWA Flight 355 and sentenced to life in prison, with early parole.

== Life and career ==
According to her memoir, she was born in Eugene, Oregon, and was raised in Portland, Oregon. She graduated from the University of Oregon, attended University of Vienna in Austria and obtained a master's degree in German language, literature, and linguistics at Portland State University. In Oregon, she worked as a nurse's aid, teacher, and mental health therapist for abused teenagers.

In 1972, she married Zvonko Bušić and they lived together in Austria, Germany, Oregon, and Ohio before moving to New York City. They were active in publicizing human rights abuses in the former Yugoslavia, especially the murder of Croatian dissidents by the Yugoslav secret police organization UDBA in the so-called "black program", and in promoting the cause of Croatian independence. Julienne Bušić and a friend were imprisoned briefly in Zagreb in the early 1970s for disseminating literature critical of the Yugoslavian totalitarian government.

On September 10, 1976, she, her husband, and three others hijacked domestic Trans World Airlines flight 355 departing from New York for Chicago, using the threat of a bomb. While refueling the hijacked plane at Montréal–Mirabel International Airport, they told officials that they had planted a bomb in a locker at Grand Central Terminal and gave them instructions on finding it. They demanded that an appeal to the American people concerning Croatia's independence be printed in The New York Times, The Washington Post, the Chicago Tribune, the Los Angeles Times, and the International Herald Tribune. The plane was then flown to Gander, Newfoundland, where 35 of its passengers were released. From there the plane was accompanied by a larger TWA plane that guided it to Keflavík, Iceland. The hijackers' initial European destination was London, but the British government refused them permission to land.

During the hijacking, the device at Grand Central Terminal was found and taken to the New York City Police Department (NYPD) Rodman's Neck Firing Range where police attempted to dismantle it, rather than detonate it. This bomb exploded, killing NYPD officer Brian Murray and wounding another, Terrence McTigue. The hijackers had the airliner flying over London, where they dropped pamphlets promoting Croatian independence from Yugoslavia. The group surrendered without bloodshed, with their onboard bomb proving to be a harmless pressure cooker.

Zvonko and Julienne Bušić were convicted of air piracy resulting in death, which carried a mandatory life sentence with parole eligibility after 10 years. In 1979, she was attacked in prison by Manson Family member Lynette "Squeaky" Fromme. She was released from federal prison in 1989 after serving 13 years in the minimum security Federal Correctional Institution in Dublin, California.

During and after her stint in prison, Bušić corresponded at length with Kathleen Murray Moran, the wife of the bomb squad member killed during the incident. Murray Moran advocated for Bušić's early release. Murray Moran would later, quite publicly, regret that advocacy. In 1982, Murray filed a lawsuit against the NYPD, charging gross negligence in the handling of the explosives, which "caused the death of Officer Murray".

Bušić subsequently moved to Croatia and supported Croatian political causes in the United States and Europe. She was involved in publishing, translation, and literary projects, and wrote for literary journals both in Croatia and the United States, including Ooligan Press, Verbatim, Gobshite Quarterly, and Vijenac. She was also a weekly columnist for the Croatian news portal Dalje. Her husband was granted parole in 2008, at which time he rejoined his wife in Croatia. Zvonko Bušić committed suicide in 2013.

The Snap Judgment radio show March 29, 2018 episode "Unforgiven" discussed her case.

In January 2020, she took part in a controversial Croatian Democratic Union advertisement to support the re-election of Kolinda Grabar-Kitarović as the President of Croatia. She died in Zagreb on May 21, 2026, at the age of 77.

== Books ==
Her first book, Lovers and Madmen (2000), chronicles her relationship with Zvonko and the death threats and attempts on their lives that led up to the hijacking. Her second book, Your Blood and Mine (2008), is an extended commentary on the U.S. federal prison system, as portrayed by her letters to Zvonko throughout his 32-year incarceration. Her third book, Living Cells (2012) is a true story of a Croatian woman held as a sex slave during the siege of Vukovar.
