= Torment Saint =

Biographical Book

Torment Saint: The Life of Elliott Smith
- Author: William Todd Schultz
- Language: English
- Subject: Elliott Smith
- Genre: Biography
- Published: October 1, 2013 (Bloomsbury)
- Publication place: United States
- Media type: Print, on-line
- Pages: 368
- ISBN: 978-1608199730
- Preceded by: Elliott Smith

Torment Saint: The Life of Elliott Smith is a biographical book about the American singer-songwriter Elliott Smith, written by William Todd Schultz. It was released on October 1, 2013, by Bloomsbury.
