= Robert Livingston Pell =

American landowner

- Born: May 8, 1818; Pelham Manor, New York, U.S.
- Died: February 11, 1880 (aged 61); Manhattan, New York, U.S.
- Education: American Literary, Scientific and Military Academy
- Alma mater: Yale University
- Spouse: Maria Louisa Brinckerhoff (m. 1837; death 1866)
- Children: Adelia Duane Pell; Robert Troup Pell; James Brinckerhoff Pell
- Parent(s): Alfred Sands Pell; Adelia Duane Pell
- Relatives: James Duane (grandfather)

Robert Livingston Pell (May 8, 1818 – February 11, 1880) was an American landowner and descendant of several prominent colonial families of New York.

== Early life ==
Pell was born at the old Pell mansion in Pelham on May 8, 1818. He was a son of Alfred Sands Pell (1786–1831) and Adelia (née Duane) Pell (1765–1860). Among his siblings were four brothers John Augustus Pell, James Duane Pell, George Washington Pell, and Richard Montgomery Pell. His family was among the largest landowners along the Hudson River.

His maternal grandparents were Mary (née Livingston) Duane and James Duane, a signer of the Articles of Confederation, first post-colonial Mayor of New York City, and first Judge of the United States District Court for the District of New York. His grandmother was the eldest living daughter of Robert Livingston, 3rd Lord of Livingston Manor. His aunt, Mary Duane, was the wife of Gen. William North, and another aunt, Sarah Duane, was the wife of geologist and geographer George William Featherstonhaugh. Through his father, he was a nephew of William Ferris Pell and a descendant of Thomas Pell, 1st Lord of the Pelham Manor. His first cousin, Alfred Shipley Pell, was a co-founder of the Mutual Life Insurance Company of New York (known today as AXA) in 1843.

Pell attended school in New York City before entering American Literary, Scientific and Military Academy in 1825. He graduated from the Academy in 1829 and then attended Yale University, where he graduated in 1832. After his time at Yale, he went on a Grand Tour of Europe between 1832 and 1833.

== Career ==
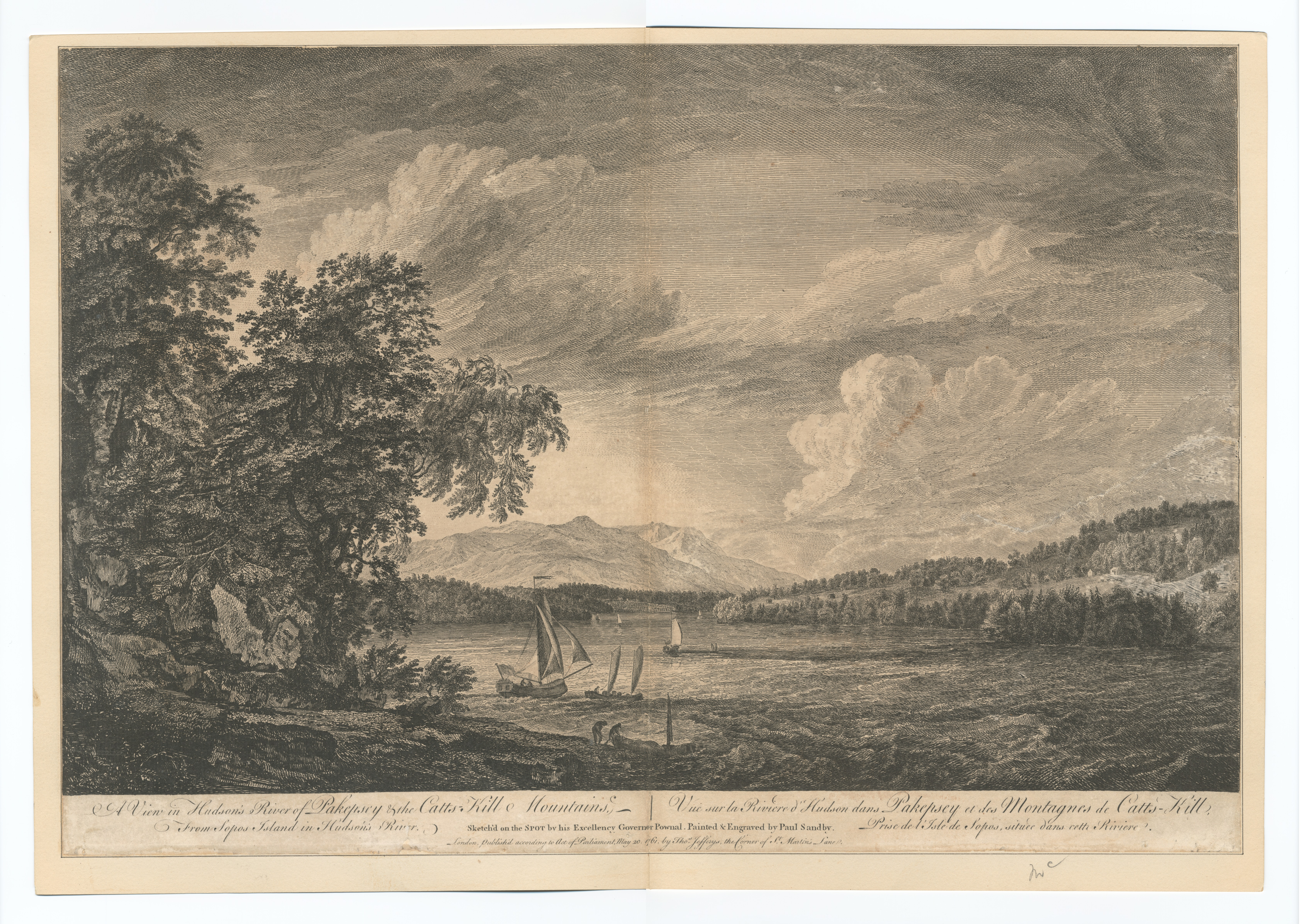
A view of Poughkeepsie and the Catskill Mountains from Esopus Island in the Hudson River.

Pell "had a passion for agricultural pursuits, and was a familiar figure in agricultural clubs and conventions, as well as an author of many valuable papers on fruit-culture and kindred topics. His information on agricultural questions, and his knowledge of agriculture as a science, were thorough and profound; and inheriting the parental bias for landhold, his possessions at Hyde Park were of vast extent. Besides being the owner of Pelham farm, an estate of 600 acres, beautifully laid out, and situated four miles above Hyde Park, he was the proprietor of another estate, of large acreage, named the Cedars."

In 1838, Pell established a 1,200 acre farm just north of Esopus (which was established after "separating" from Kingston in 1811). He was one of the first farmers to grow apples and export them to Europe. Also on his farm, they had apple orchards, 50 acres of vineyards (with Isabella grapes), and ten artificial lakes used for breeding fish. On his estate, he built a brick mansion, in the Romanesque style that was painted "a beautiful straw color and white." In June 1904, the Redemptorist Fathers purchased 235 acres from the Pell's estate and built Mount St. Alphonsus Seminary, which they owned until 2012, when it was sold to a Bruderhof Community (who live in nearby Rifton) for $21.5 million.

Pell owned an island known as Pell Island (today known as Esopus Island), over a mile in length, in the middle of the Hudson River situated across his estate, and Overlook Mountain (near Woodstock), where he had built the Overlook Mountain House, which became a fashionable resort for summer tourists. Pell also owned four million acres of Yellow Pine timber lands in Southern Georgia.

Reportedly, during the U.S. Civil War, Pell purchased "seventeen million acres of wild land, for nominal prices, in Georgia, Virginia, Florida, Texas, Arkansas and Missouri; and sold to the Rothschilds in Europe three millions of acres for seven dollars an acre, and they resold the same for fourteen dollars an acre."

== Personal life ==
On July 8, 1837, Pell was married to Maria Louisa Brinckerhoff (1816–1866). Maria was the daughter of James Lefferts Brinckerhoff and Charlotte (née Troup) Brinckerhoff. Her maternal grandparents were Robert Troup and Jannetje (née Goelet) Troup (granddaughter of Peter Goelet. Her sister, Charlotte Brinckerhoff was the wife of Frederic Bronson, and was the mother of Frederic Bronson (who married Sarah Gracie King). Together, Maria and Robert were the parents of two sons and one daughter, of whom only his daughter survived him:

- Adelia Duane Pell (1838–1915), who married John Busteed Ireland (1823–1913), a great-grandson of Jonathan Lawrence (of the Continental Army) and William Floyd (a signer of the Declaration of Independence). in 1863.
- Robert Troup Pell (1840–1868), who died unmarried.
- James Brinckerhoff Pell (1841–1870), an 1863 Columbia University graduate, who died unmarried.

His wife died on November 10, 1866. On February 11, 1880, Pell died at 218 Fifth Avenue, the home of his ninety year old aunt in New York City where he usually spent his winters. After a funeral at Trinity Chapel in New York, he was buried at Green-Wood Cemetery in Brooklyn.

=== Descendants ===
Through his daughter Adelia, he was a grandfather to John DeCourcy Ireland (1865–1951), who married Elizabeth Gallatin (great-granddaughter of Albert Gallatin) in 1895; Robert Livingston Ireland (1867–1928), who married heiress Kate Benedict Harvey and was the father of Robert Livingston Ireland Jr.; Maria Louise Ireland (1870–1965), who married Easton Earl Madeira; and Adelia Ireland (1872–1936), who married Dr. Montgomery H. Sicard (who was connected with the marine division of Standard Oil of New Jersey).
