= Pound Ridge massacre =

Battle in 1644

Coordinates: 41.208°N 73.574°W

The Pound Ridge massacre was a battle of Kieft's War that took place in March 1644 between the forces of New Netherland and members of the Wappinger Confederacy at a village of its members in the present-day town of Pound Ridge, New York. A mixed force of 130 New Netherland soldiers led by Captain John Underhill launched a night attack on the village and destroyed it with fire. 500 to 700 members of the Wappinger Confederacy were killed while the New Netherland force lost one man killed and fifteen wounded. More casualties were suffered in this attack than in any other single incident in the war. Shortly after the battle several local Wappinger Confederacy sachems sued for peace.

== Background ==
Kieft's War began in 1640 as a result of escalating tensions over land use, livestock control, trade and taxation between the Dutch West India Company colony of New Netherland and neighboring native peoples. In September 1639 Director Willem Kieft decided to levy a tax in pelts, maize or wampum on Indian peoples surrounding New Amsterdam. In May 1640 the Director ordered each of the inhabitants to provide themselves with a gun and organized them under corporals.

The conflict began when the Raritan people attacked a sloop sent to trade with them in the spring of 1640. Several Raritan, Dutch colonists and Dutch livestock were killed on Staten Island in 1640 and 1641. Kieft placed bounties of wampum on the Raritan which bought him the alliance of several Indian groups. These included the Indians of western Long Island as well as the Tankiteke of the Wappinger Confederacy led by their sachem Pachum. The Tankiteke inhabited present-day eastern Westchester County, New York and Fairfield County, Connecticut. The Dutch then came into conflict with the Wecquaesgeek of the Wappinger Confederacy in present-day Westchester County over the murder of a Dutch settler on Manhattan. The Dutch launched an abortive expedition against the Wesquaesgeek in 1642. That year also saw the beginning of armed conflict with the Hackensack tribe of present-day New Jersey with the murder of two Dutch colonists.

In February 1643 the Wesquaesgeek were attacked by musket-wielding Mohawk from the vicinity of Fort Orange and sought shelter on Manhattan and in Hackensack territory. On February 25 the Dutch killed between 80 and 120 of the Wesquaesgeek in surprise attacks at Corlaer's Hook in Manhattan and the Pavonia Massacre in Hackensack territory. There was subsequently conflict between the Dutch and Indians of Long Island. Tentative treaties were negotiated with the Hackensack, Wesquaesgeek and Long Island Indians, but the former Tankiteke ally Pachum brought the Wappinger Confederacy into war with the Dutch in August 1643. The Wappinger tribe attacked Dutch ships along the Hudson River beginning with an incident in their territory in present-day Poughkeepsie, New York. Soon other Indian groups rejoined the war and all of the Dutch settlements in present-day Westchester and New Jersey were destroyed or abandoned. The Siwanoy, who lived along the Long Island Sound between Hell Gate and Norwalk, killed 18 settlers including religious dissenter Anne Hutchinson in an attack near present-day New Rochelle.

The colonial government responded to the Indian attacks by training and arming local colonists. Captain John Underhill, a renowned veteran of the Pequot War of 1637, was recruited from the New Haven Colony town of Stamford to lead this force. Underhill had co-led the attack in what came to be known as the Mystic massacre. In this engagement the New England colonists surrounded a Pequot village and set it on fire, killing between 400 and 700 inhabitants. The colonial government also appealed to the Dutch government and to the New Haven colony for men and supplies. The only support forthcoming was food and animal feed from the New Haven colony.

On the cusp of the New Year, John Underhill was dispatched with a force of 120 men to the town of Greenwich in response to local Wappinger Confederacy attacks. Greenwich was settled by New England colonists but had agreed to submit to Dutch suzerainty in exchange for protection. After much searching, the colonial force was finally directed to a party of Indians by the residents of the adjacent town of Stamford. Underhill's force managed to kill or capture twenty Indians in a surprise attack. A raid was soon launched on the Wesquaesgeek which managed to destroy two villages and much of the Indians' stored winter food. Underhill next participated in an attack on the Indians of western Long Island in February 1644. The colonial force managed to kill 120 Indians in attacks on two villages. Only one colonial soldier was killed and three were wounded.

== The massacre ==
John Underhill returned to Stamford to acquire information on the whereabouts of the Indians. He encountered the guide who had led them in the initial unproductive phase of the last expedition in the region. The guide was anxious to demonstrate his good will and offered to lead Underhill to a large concentration of Indians nearby. As a result, three yachts delivered 130 colonial soldiers to Greenwich under the joint command of General John Underhill and Hendrick van Dyck Ensign. The army was forced to spend a night in Greenwich due to a winter storm. The next day the army marched out into the surrounding hilly country. Traveling conditions were so poor that some men had to crawl at stages. The army came within a mile of the Indian village by eight in the evening. After resting for a couple of hours, the army crossed two rivers and surrounded the village which was located in the hollow of a great hill.

The village was called "Nanichiestawack" meaning "Place of Safety". The Lenape were gathered for a pow wow during a winter ceremony of celebration in their place of safety on sacred lands of their ancestors with special guests from local tribes. The Siwanoy and Tankiteke were attempting to integrate their bands with five others of the Wappinger confederacy, including the Raritan, Wecquaesgeek, and by some accounts members of the Ramapo, with blessings on the land and people. Scholars and local historians do not agree on the actual site of the massacre. Some historians believe it to be located on the border of modern Bedford and Pound Ridge Townships adjacent to the Pound Ridge Reservation where two rivers intersect beneath what later became a mine in the 1930s of rose quartz. Others assume it to be located between Routes 104 and 172. It consisted of three orderly rows of houses each 80 paces long. The Dutch report confirms that the Indians had gathered there for a winter festival.

The night attack on the village was conducted under the light of a full moon. The Indians were awake when the colonial force launched its attack. In the initial phase Dutch reports suggest 180 Indians were killed outside of the houses while one colonial soldier was killed and twelve wounded. The village was sufficiently encircled by the attacking force such that the Indians could not escape. The survivors holed up in the houses and fired arrows at the assaulting army.

In a repetition of the tactics employed in the Mystic massacre, John Underhill and his co-commander ordered the village set on fire with the inhabitants inside, including mostly Women, children and tribal elders. The Dutch account reported on this phase of the battle, according to Underhill, "What was most wonderful is, that among this vast collection of Men, Women and Children not one was heard to cry or to scream."

Only eight Indians survived the battle of whom three were severely wounded. According to the surviving tribes, more than 600 Native Americans from seven tribes had been killed in the massacre. Reports by colonists claim between 500 and 600 killed by Underhill's troops most of whom were burned alive.

The survivors included a medicine man and his grandson who arrived the next day to the sight of burnt family members. In total the colonial force lost only one man and fifteen wounded. The Native Americans were unprepared for war as they had nurtured a strong relationship with local officials and possessed memorandum of agreement based on mutual respect for the land with local officials. John Underhill violated these agreements and was wounded in the attack. The army remained at the battle site for the night and departed the next morning. The army arrived in Stamford by the afternoon and was welcomed by the inhabitants. The army left Stamford and arrived at New Amsterdam after two days. A Thanksgiving celebration was held on its return.

== Aftermath ==
The enormous devastation wrought on the Indians at the Pound Ridge Massacre and at preceding battles compelled several sachems to seek peace with the colonial government. S.F. Cook roughly estimates the combined Siwanoy and Tankiteke population as only 1800 in 1620. Four sachems arrived in Stamford and concluded a truce with Kieft on April 6, 1644, none from the Siwanoy and Tankiteke, as they had perished in the massacre. Soon afterwards representatives of the Matinecoc tribe on Long Island agreed to a truce, although several nearby tribes continued fighting. The war would muddle on for another year with neither side taking decisive action.

Sachems of the Sintsink, Wecquaesgeek, Nochpeem, and Wappinger presented themselves at Fort Amsterdam in April of 1645 and asked for peace but a final agreement with all of the belligerent parties was not agreed until August 31, 1645. Peter Stuyvesant was chosen to replace Willem Kieft as the Director of New Netherland in early 1645 due to great dissatisfaction with Kieft's administration. However, Kieft would continue at his post for two more years, drowning en route to the Netherlands in late September 1647 when recalled by the company to defend his actions as governor.

== See also ==
- List of Indian massacres in North America
