= Morris Birkbeck Pell =

- Born: 31 March 1827; Albion, Illinois, U.S.
- Died: 7 May 1879 (aged 52); Glebe, New South Wales, Australia
- Education: Cambridge University
- Occupations: Mathematician, professor, lawyer and actuary
- Spouse: Julia Rusden
- Parent(s): Eliza Birkbeck; Gilbert Titus Pell
- Relatives: Morris Birkbeck (grandfather)

Morris Birkbeck Pell (31 March 1827 – 7 May 1879) was an American-Australian mathematician, professor, lawyer and actuary. He became the inaugural Professor of Mathematics and Natural Philosophy at the University of Sydney in 1852, and continued in the role until ill health enforced his retirement in 1877. He was for many years a member of the University Senate, and councillor and secretary of the Royal Society of New South Wales.

== Early life ==
Pell's mother Eliza Birkbeck (1797-1880) was a daughter of Morris Birkbeck (1764-1825), the English agricultural innovator, social reformer and antislavery campaigner. In 1817-18 Birkbeck, with George Flower, had founded a utopian colony, the English Settlement, in the Illinois Territory of the United States, and Birkbeck laid out the new town there of Albion, Illinois. A widower since 1804, Birkbeck had brought his seven children with him to America, and it was there that his daughter Eliza met and married Gilbert Titus Pell (1796-1860), who came from a prominent family of New York politicians. Gilbert Pell was descended from Sir John Pell (1643-1702), Lord of Pelham Manor, New York—who was the son of English mathematician Dr. John Pell (1611-1685), and nephew and heir of early American pioneer and settler Thomas Pell. Gilbert Pell served as a representative in the Illinois legislature, and in the 1850s was appointed United States envoy to Mexico.

Morris Pell was born of this union in the new settlement of Albion in 1827, their third child and only son. In 1835 the family separated and Mrs Pell took her children first to Poughkeepsie, New York, then to Plymouth, England, in 1841, where Morris attended the New Grammar School. In 1849 he graduated as Senior Wrangler in mathematics at Cambridge University—a position once regarded as "the greatest intellectual achievement attainable in Britain."

== Career ==
In 1852, aged 24, Pell was chosen from twenty-six candidates to become the first Professor of Mathematics and Natural Philosophy at the newly opened University of Sydney, in the British colony of New South Wales, Australia. With his new wife Jane Juliana (née Rusden), his mother and two sisters he sailed from England to Australia on the Asiatic and became one of the university's three foundation professors. Professor Pell gave the first lecture in Mathematics on 13 October 1852, two days after the university's inauguration, to all 24 students of the university. One of them, William Windeyer, later to become Chancellor of the university, wrote in his diary: "Went to a lecture at 10 with Mr Pell, who amused as well as instructed, I think I shall like him ...".

In 1854, in evidence to a New South Wales Legislative Council select committee on education, Pell advocated the opening of a secular grammar school. In 1859 he testified to the New South Wales Legislative Assembly select committees on the Sydney Grammar School and the University of Sydney, regarding the composition of the University Senate, the adverse effect of clergy on enrolments, the value of liberal studies in the education of businessmen and squatters, and the beneficial effect of the university on secondary education. His evidence resulted in ex-officio membership of the University Senate for professors. He was a member of the Senate from 1861 to 1877 and after resignation was re-elected to the senate in 1878 by members of convocation.

Pell was a member of the Australian Philosophical Society from 1856 and served on its council in 1858. Subsequently, Queen Victoria granted Royal Assent to the Society and it was renamed the Royal Society of New South Wales. Pell was a member and its secretary from 1867, and a member of its council from 1869.

For many years almost crippled by an injury to his spine, Pell resigned in mid-1877 as professor of mathematics at Sydney University, on a pension of £412 10s.

== Personal life ==
On 7 May 1879, aged 52, he died of "progressive paralysis" (see Motor neuron disease) and was buried in the Balmain Cemetery in Sydney. He was survived by his estranged wife Julia (née Rusden), five sons and three daughters.
