= TWA Flight 355 =

1976 aircraft hijacking

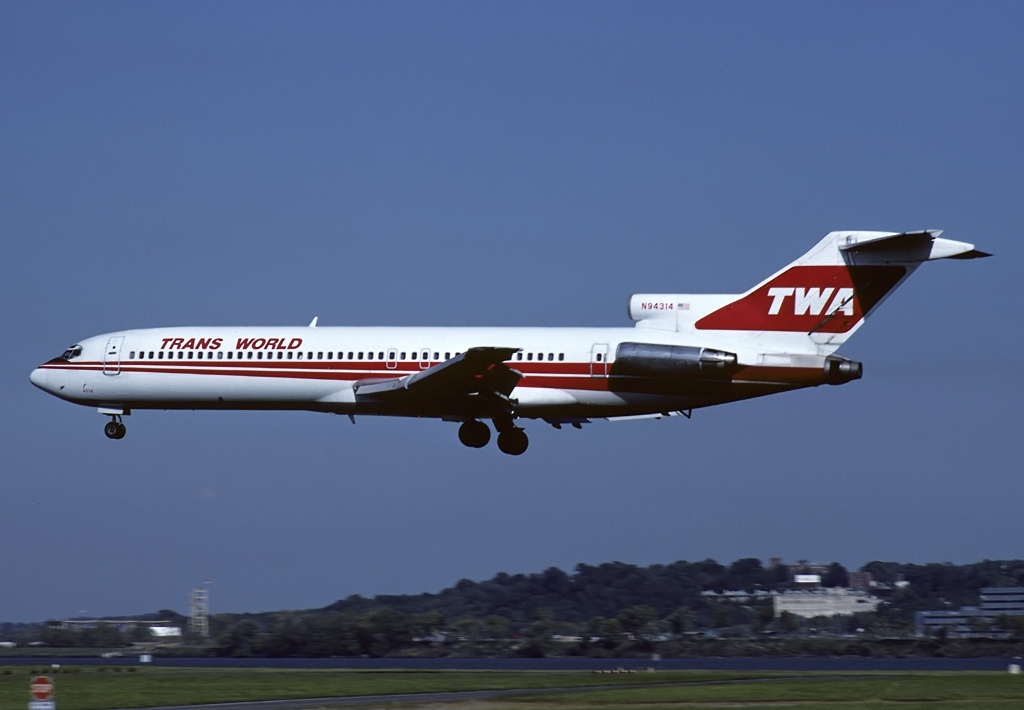
- N94314, the aircraft involved seen here on October 3, 1989

Hijacking
- Date: September 10, 1976
- Summary: Hijacking
- Site: United States and Canada

Aircraft
- Aircraft type: Boeing 727-231
- Operator: Trans World Airlines
- IATA flight No.: TW355
- ICAO flight No.: TWA355
- Call sign: TWA 355
- Registration: N94314
- Flight origin: LaGuardia Airport, New York
- 1st stopover: Mirabel International Airport, Canada
- 2nd stopover: Gander International Airport, Canada
- 3rd stopover: Keflavik International Airport, Iceland
- Last stopover: Paris, France
- Destination: O'Hare International Airport, Chicago
- Occupants: 92
- Passengers: 85 (including 5 hijackers)
- Crew: 7
- Fatalities: 0
- Survivors: 92

Ground casualties
- Ground fatalities: 1

Trans World Airlines Flight 355 was a domestic Trans World Airlines flight that was hijacked on September 10, 1976, by five "Fighters for Free Croatia", a group seeking Croatian independence from Yugoslavia.

== Aircraft ==
The aircraft involved was a Boeing 727-231, registered as N94314 with serial number 20047. It was manufactured by Boeing Commercial Airplanes in 1968.

== Hijacking ==
The Boeing 727 plane took off from New York's LaGuardia Airport and was headed to O'Hare International Airport in Chicago. The hijackers were Slobodan Vlašić, Zvonko Bušić, his wife Julienne Bušić, Petar Matanić, and Frane Pešut. The hijackers claimed to have a bomb with them as they seized control of the plane in the 95th minute of its flight.

The group redirected the plane to Montreal's Mirabel International Airport where they refueled and told officials that they had planted a bomb in a locker at Grand Central Terminal and gave them instructions on finding it. They demanded that an appeal to the American people concerning Croatia's independence be printed in The New York Times, The Washington Post, the Chicago Tribune, the Los Angeles Times, and the International Herald Tribune. The plane was then flown to Gander, Newfoundland, where 35 of its passengers were released. Air Traffic Control manager, Thomas Scott, was directly involved in negotiations with the hijackers and these talks led to the release of the 35 passengers. For his efforts, Scott was presented with an award of merit from Transport Canada. From there the plane was accompanied by a larger TWA plane that guided it to Keflavík, Iceland. The hijackers' initial European destination was London, but the British government refused them permission to land.

During the hijacking the device at Grand Central Terminal was found and taken to Rodman's Neck Firing Range where police attempted to dismantle it rather than detonate it. After setting a cutting instrument on the two wires attached to the device, the officers retreated from the pit for several minutes. When they returned to the pit to continue dismantling the device, it exploded and killed NYPD officer Brian Murray, and wounded another, Terrence McTigue.

The plane landed in Paris where the hijackers surrendered after direct talks with U.S. ambassador Kenneth Rush, and their supposedly explosive devices were revealed to be fakes, simple pressure cookers. As the police took Julienne Bušić away, the plane's pilot gave her a hug in gratitude for her calming of the passengers during the hijacking.

== Imprisonment ==
All five hijackers were convicted by a US court of aircraft piracy and conspiracy to commit aircraft piracy. Zvonko Bušić and Julienne Bušić were convicted of more serious charges of aircraft piracy resulting in death for the killing of Brian Murray. Zvonko and Julienne both received mandatory life sentences, while Pešut, Matanić, and Vlašić each received 30-year sentences.

Frane Pešut served 12 years in prison. He was deported to Croatia in 2007. Petar Matanić and Slobodan Vlašić were released along with Pešut in 1988. Julienne Bušić was released in 1989. By the 1990s and early 2000s, the last remaining hijacker in prison was Zvonko Bušić. On several occasions after Croatian independence, Croatian president Franjo Tuđman appealed to American president Bill Clinton for Bušić's release or transfer to Croatia. In 2003, the Croatian Parliament passed a resolution that Bušić should be transferred to Croatia, which it submitted to the Council of Europe. The liberal Croatian Helsinki Committee also took up the cause of Bušić's release.

On June 7, 2008, Bušić was granted parole, after serving 32 years in prison. He was then deported to Croatia, where he was greeted by approximately 500 people at Zagreb's Pleso airport. Among those in the crowd were Dražen Budiša, Anto Kovačević, Marko Perković, and all four of the other hijackers. The crowd greeted him with a Nazi salute.

Julienne Bušić wrote a book named Lovers and Madmen about the hijacking and her love for the head of the operation.

Zvonko Bušic committed suicide on September 1, 2013, by gunshot at his home in Rovanjska near Zadar; he was discovered by his wife. He was 67 years old.

== See also ==
- Trans World Airlines Flight 106
