= Rodman's Neck =

Peninsula in the Bronx, New York

Coordinates: 40°51′09″N 73°48′02″W

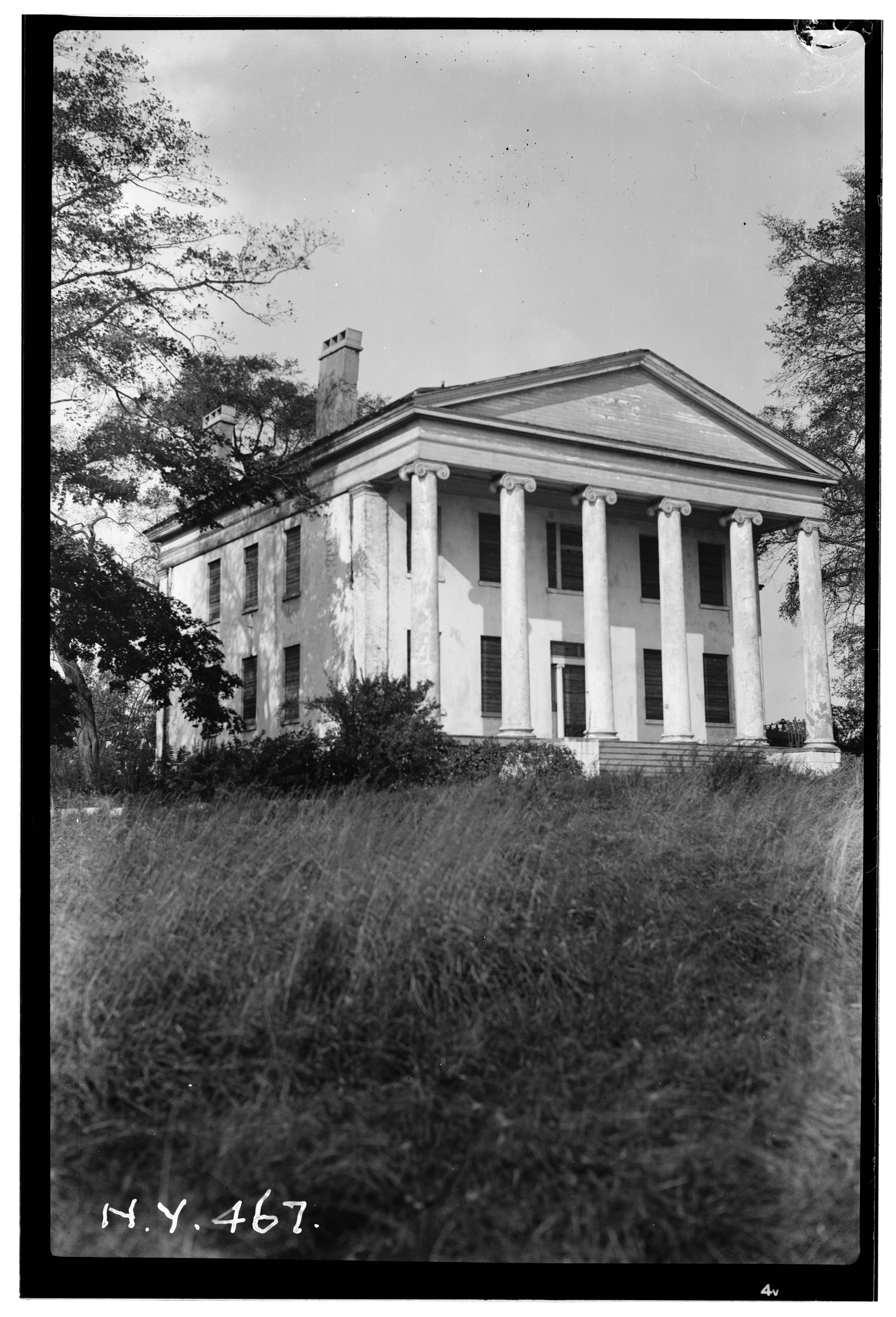
Former private mansion on Rodman's Neck

Rodman's Neck (formerly Ann Hook's Neck) is a peninsula of land in the New York City borough of the Bronx that juts out into Long Island Sound. The southern third of the peninsula is used as a firing range by the New York City Police Department; the remaining wooded section is part of Pelham Bay Park. The north side is joined to what used to be Hunters Island and Twin Island to form Orchard Beach and a parking lot.

Rodman's Neck has three meadows. One is a natural salt water meadow; the other two are manmade freshwater meadows, one of which was created by Robert Moses' projects. The City Island Traffic Circle and several small ballfields also exist, while every original building has been razed. A landfill area for City Island Road crosses Turtle Cove Saltwater Marsh with a culvert made of concrete pipes connecting it to the salt water Eastchester Bay. A second land berm built for horsecars had its always-clogged three foot diameter culvert removed, and a trench with a stainless steel bridge was installed.

== History ==
Rodman's Neck

US Naval Reserve Training Station at Rodman's Neck

The first inhabitants of the land now known as Rodman's Neck were the Siwanoy, the indigenous people of the area. The land was included in the purchase made by Thomas Pell in 1654. Rodman's Neck is named after a local man, Samuel Rodman, while the southern tip, known as "Pell's Point", is where the British landed during the Revolutionary War's Battle of Pell's Point. It was originally named "Anne's Hoeck" (or Ann Hook's Neck) after Anne Hutchinson; her killer, Wampage I, who took the name Anhõõke after the massacre; and his son, Wampage II, who used the name "Ann Hook".

Rodman had owned a ferry that ran between Minneford Island (now known as City Island) and Anne's Hoeck where the bridge is now. Then L.R. Marshall built a Southern-style mansion on his estate, renamed "Hawkswood", at the southernmost tip of Rodman's Neck. His mansion was converted and used as an inn until 1888, when the New York City Parks Department acquired the property for Pelham Bay Park. A dock for the eastern shore of Rodman's Neck was approved in 1891, with funds appropriated for said dock.

Due to overcrowding at the nearby Hunter Island campsite, NYC Parks opened a campsite in 1906 at Rodman's Neck on the south tip of the island, with 100 bathhouses.

The land was first used as a United States Army training location from 1917 to 1919, during World War I, when it was used by the 105th and 108th Infantry Regiments. It became parkland in the 1920s, but was seldom utilized.

Between 1930 and 1936, the southern tip of the peninsula was used by the New York City Police Academy for summer training and explosives detonation. It was also part of Camp Mulrooney, a summer camp for the NYPD, and was used in that sense until 1936.

In 1941, during World War II, the U.S. Department of War began to use the area as a Navy base. The Army used Rodman's Neck again in the 1950s during the Cold War, building a radar fire control center there. In 1959, the peninsula's operation was transferred to the NYPD who built the current firing range at the peninsula's southern tip. Early signs at the entrance said, "NYPD Pistol Range". In 1976, one NYPD Officer was killed and another was badly injured in The Pit when a bomb went off accidentally.

== NYPD firing range ==
A 54-acre police training facility is operated by the NYPD Firearms & Tactics Section and is used for handgun and rifle practice and qualification by the NYPD, the Federal Bureau of Investigation, Fire Department Fire Marshals, Correction Department, Immigration and Customs Enforcement, and training probationary police officers, as well as for antiterrorist, disorder control, Emergency Service Units, and Organized Crime Control Bureau training. The base has seven rifle ranges with a 230 total firing points for trainees. The base has a school with lecture hall and seven classrooms with instructors. The base also has a training area designed to look like a city neighborhood for practical training exercises. It has one of the world's largest police armories and a firearms machine shop for maintenance and experimental weapons development.

The grounds include mock buildings called Urban Training Center/Tactical Village and Tactics House used for urban training scenarios, and a FireArms Training Simulator building including an interactive video simulator that was all paid for by the Federal Bureau of Investigation. There is also a specially equipped vehicle armed for disorder control nicknamed "The War Wagon" in case of rioting. The base was used during the 1960s by the National Guard to train riot troops and was an emergency base of operations during the September 11, 2001 attacks. This area is restricted for police and military use only. The area is also used for destroying unexploded bombs. Many bombs have been detonated since 1930, including ones made by George Metesky, the Weathermen, the Black Panthers, the Animal Liberation Front, al-Qaeda, and serial bomber Cesar Sayoc. These explosives are always detonated at the southernmost point that juts out into Eastchester Bay in a crater called "The Pit". Around July 2 every year, impressive impromptu volcanic displays are put on as seized illegal fireworks are destroyed.

The range was intended as a temporary facility, according to the plans laid out by Robert Moses and Mayors Robert F. Wagner, Jr., John Lindsay, and Abraham D. Beame. However, Mayor Ed Koch favored it becoming permanent. The range was previously part of Pelham Bay Park. In the late 1980s, Governor Mario Cuomo signed an eminent domain law separating this land from the park and giving the NYPD the right to stay permanently. The range was to have been converted into the Olympic Firing Range for the unsuccessful New York City 2012 Olympic bid.

A widely used paper target figure officially known as "Advanced Silhouette SP-83A" or target "B-60" may have been developed in the early 1960s as a likeness of Sergeant Fred V. Worell, an instructor at the range. The target is colloquially known as "The Thug".

In April 2007, the NYPD announced that all gun practice would move to a new indoors facility in College Point, Queens. Due to shortages in funding, the move was canceled and it was deemed cheaper to renovate Rodman's Neck for $275 million. In February 2024, the NYPD decided to proceed with plans to build an indoor firing range at Rodman's Neck.
