= Duncan Pell =

American politician

Lieutenant Governor of Rhode Island
- In office 1865–1866
- Governor: James Y. Smith
- Preceded by: Seth Padelford
- Succeeded by: William Greene

Personal details
- Born: Duncan Campbell Pell; January 18, 1807 New York City, New York, U.S.
- Died: January 16, 1874 (aged 66) Newport, Rhode Island, U.S.
- Spouse: Anna Clarke (m. 1834)
- Relations: Alfred Shipley Pell (brother)
- Children: 3
- Parent(s): Mary Shipley Pell; William Ferris Pell
- Education: Litchfield Law School

Duncan Campbell Pell (January 18, 1807 – January 16, 1874) served as the lieutenant governor of Rhode Island, and President of the State Senate in that state from 1865 to 1866.

== Early life ==
Pell was born in New York City on January 18, 1807. He was the third of eleven children born to Mary (née Shipley) Pell and William Ferris Pell. His father was a New York merchant from 1808 to 1840, who founded the famous auction firm of Pell & Company, and his brother, Alfred Shipley Pell, was a co-founder of the Mutual Life Insurance Company of New York.

== Career ==
Pell studied at the Litchfield Law School and was admitted to the bar in Albany in 1828. he entered into an auctioneering partnership with his father on January 23, 1831. He was also a commissioner with the Washington Marine Insurance Company. He was described as "the finest looking man of his day in Wall Street." In 1848, after approximately 17 years as a partner, Pell withdrew from D. C. & W. Pell & Co., likely a later iteration of W. F. Pell & Co. He was a member of the Saint Nicholas Society of the City of New York, having been elected on June 1, 1874, shortly before his death.

Soon afterwards, he moved with to Newport, Rhode Island, where he would remain until his death. In 1865, he was elected with 10,815 votes (vs. 97 votes for Henry Butler of Warwick) to succeed Seth Padelford as the Lieutenant Governor of Rhode Island under Gov. James Y. Smith.

The 1870 census lists him as a retired merchant, with a net worth of nearly $400,000 (nearly $8 million today).

== Personal life ==
In 1834, Pell was married to Anna Clarke (1817–1899), the daughter of Ann Low (née Carey) Cooper Clarke and George Hyde Clarke of Hyde Hall, (a mansion on Lake Otsego said to have been the largest private home in the country). Her elder brother, George Hyde Clarke (1822–1889) was married to Maria Gregory. Together, they were the parents of:

- Georgina Clarke Pell (1835–1851), who died aged 16.
- Duncan Archibald Pell (1842–1874), who was a colonel in the Civil War on the staff of General Ambrose Burnside. He married Caroline Plympton Cheever.
- Leslie Pell-Clarke (1853–1904), who married Henrietta Temple, daughter of Emmet Temple, in 1876.

Stricken with apoplexy, Pell died in Newport on January 16, 1874, at the age of 68. He was buried at Island Cemetery in Newport. His wife remained in Newport, residing at the corner of Mary and Clarke Streets in Newport.

Political offices
Preceded by Seth Padelford	Lieutenant Governor of Rhode Island; 1865–1866	Succeeded by William Greene
