= Alfred Shipley Pell =

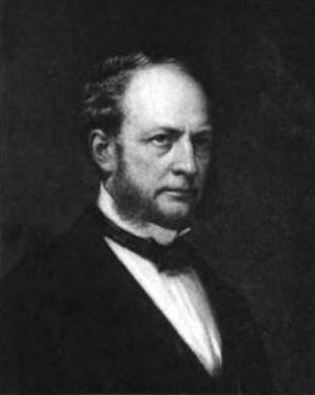
Alfred Shipley Pell

Alfred Shipley Pell (April 27, 1805 – May 21, 1869) was an American insurance executive who co-founded the Mutual Life Insurance Company of New York.

== Early life ==
Pell was born in Westchester County, New York, on April 27, 1805. He was the second son of William Ferris Pell and Mary (née Shipley) Pell (1783–1848). His elder brother was Archibald Morris Pell (who married Catherine Elizabeth Rutgers). His younger siblings were Duncan Pell, the Lieutenant Governor of Rhode Island, Walden Pell (who married Orleanna R. Ellery), Morris Shipley Pell (who married Mary Rodman Howland), Mary Pell (who married Capt. Francis S. Haggerty), Sophia Gertrude Pell (who married their cousin James Duane Pell), James Kent Pell (who died unmarried), and Clarence Pell (who married Annie Claiborne).

His paternal grandparents were shipping merchant Benjamin Pell and Marianna (née Ferris) Pell. His mother was the daughter of Morris Shipley of London.

== Career ==
Pell worked for the Mutual Safety Insurance Company before Pell and Morris Robinson decided to form a life insurance company with Robinson as president. They received a charter for the Mutual Life Insurance Company of New York from the state of New York on April 12, 1842, and opened the doors for business less than a year later on February 1, 1843. Robinson served as president of Mutual Life until his death in May 1849 after which he was succeeded by Joseph B. Collins. Pell was also among the founders of the American Free Trade League.

In 1848, he became the New York agent of the Liverpool, London and Globe Insurance Company which had been founded in 1836. He continued to serve in that capacity, and as United States manager of the firm until his death in 1869. After his death, his son Alfred succeeded him as manager of the Liverpool, London and Globe Insurance Company but resigned in 1871 to become the manager of the Commercial Union Assurance Company of London.

== Personal life ==
On April 9, 1829, Pell married Elizabeth Cruger (1809–1846), a descendant of the Schuyler family. Together, they were the parents of:

- William Cruger Pell (1830–1898), who married Margarita (née Brantly) Cress (1828–1906), the daughter of William Theophilus Brantly and widow of Louis Cress, in 1876.
- Alfred Walden Pell (1833–1901), who married Gertrude Elliot Cary (1840–1875), a daughter of William Ferdinand Cary and granddaughter of Thomas Handasyd Perkins, in 1867. After her death, he married Mary Kirkland Tracy (1839–1882), a daughter of Charles Tracy, in 1877. After her death, he married Mary Louisa Huntington (1845–1904), a daughter of Edward Huntington, in 1883.
- Robert S. Pell (1835–1868), who died unmarried.
- Arthur Pell (1841–1894), who died unmarried at the Hotel Normandie.

On February 17, 1848, Pell married Eliza Wood, a daughter of John Wood. Together, they were the parents of:

- Elizabeth Edith Dennistoun Pell (1852–1890), who married British banker Martin Archer-Shee, a grandson of the painter Sir Martin Archer Shee, in 1872; they were the parents of Lieutenant-Colonel Sir Martin Archer-Shee.

Pell died at West Point, New York on May 21, 1869.
