= Nathan Gold =

Nathan Gold Jr.

Deputy Governor
- In office 1708–1723
- Preceded by: Robert Treat
- Succeeded by: Joseph Talcott

Personal details
- Born: December 8, 1663 Fairfield, Connecticut
- Died: October 3, 1723 (aged 59) Fairfield, Connecticut
- Spouses: Hannah Talcott Gold; Sarah Burr Cook
- Children: 11
- Occupation: politician

Nathan Gold (December 8, 1663 – October 3, 1723), was an American colonial leader and deputy governor of the Colony of Connecticut from 1708 until his death in 1723.

== Early life ==
Gold was the only son of Major Nathan Gold and Sarah Phippen Gold and succeeded to the paternal estate in Fairfield, Connecticut. Major Nathan Gold was a leading man of Fairfield, and a petitioner for the Connecticut Charter of 1662. He raised Gold's Dragoons of the Fairfield Militia.

== Career ==
Gold served the Colony in various offices. He was a chief magistrate at Fairfield, Connecticut in 1677 He was Ensign of the Fairfield trainband in April, 1690 and Capt. in Oct., 1695. He was Deputy Governor from 1708 to 1723. He also served as Chief Justice of the Supreme Court in 1712.

== Personal life ==
Coat of Arms of Nathan Gold

Gold married Hannah Talcott on October 29, 1650. She was the daughter of Major John and Helena Wakeman Talcott, who were early founders of Hartford, Connecticut. He and Hannah had six children, Abigail, John, Nathan, Samuel, Hezekiah, and Sarah. Hannah died on March 28, 1696. He married Sarah Burr Cook about 1698. He and Sarah had five children, Sarah, Onesimus, David, Martha, and Joseph. His wife, Sarah, died on October 17, 1711.

Gold died on October 3, 1723, and is interred at the Old Burying Ground, Fairfield, Fairfield County, Connecticut.

== See also ==
- List of lieutenant governors of Connecticut
- Major Nathan Gold father of Nathan Gold Jr., signatory of Charter of Connecticut, raised Golds's Dragoons of the Fairfield Militia.
- Lt.Col. Abraham Gould grandson of Nathan Gold Jr., Killed in action at the head of his regiment,the 4th Connecticut Militia, at the Battle of Ridgefield 1777.
- Jay Gould financier, descendant of Nathan Gold, and great-grandson of Abraham Gould.
- Anna Gould Duchess of Talleyrand, socialite, descendent of Nathan Gold,
