= John Pell (landowner) =

American landowner

Sir John Pell IV

2nd Lord of Pelham Manor
- In office 1699–c. 1712
- Preceded by: Thomas Pell
- Succeeded by: Thomas Pell II

Personal details
- Born: February 3, 1643 London, England
- Died: c. 1712 (aged 68–69) Province of New York
- Spouse: Rachel Pinckney (m. 1684; died 1694)
- Children: Hannah Ward (née Pell), John Pell, Thomas Pell II, Elizabeth Pell, Mary Pugsley Hunter (née Pell), Phillip Pell, Ada Pell
- Parent(s): John Pell, Ithamaria Reginald

Sir John Pell IV, 2nd Lord of Pelham Manor (February 3, 1643 – c. 1712) (Note: Pell's date of death varies from a drowning in 1700/1702, 1712 to 1719.) was an English-born American landowner who owned Pelham, New York, as well as land that now includes the eastern Bronx and southern Westchester County, New York.

== Early life ==
Coat of Arms of John Pell

Pell was born in London, England on February 3, 1643. He was the only son born to Ithamaria (née Reginald) (Note: His mother's maiden name is sometimes spelled Reginald or Reginoilles.) Pell, who died in 1661, and the Rt. Rev. John Pell, D.D., a mathematician and political agent who graduated from Trinity College, Cambridge in 1629.

His paternal grandparents were Mary (née Holland) Pell and the Rev. John Pell. His father's only brother was Thomas Pell, a physician who was Gentleman of the Bedchamber to Charles I.

Young John was educated under his father and served as a Sewer in Ordinary, a page who passes meat to the King, to Charles II.

== Career ==
In 1635, King Charles I sent Capt. John Mason, his uncle Thomas, a surgeon general in his army, and Lion Gardiner, an engineer (and later Lord of the Manor on Gardiners Island), to Boston to construct a garrison, later known as Fort Saybrook, at the mouth of the Connecticut River. In 1654, Pell's uncle Thomas signed a treaty with Chief Wampage, and other Siwanoy Indian tribal members, that granted him 50,000 acres (20,000 ha) of tribal land, including all or part of the Bronx and land to the west along Long Island Sound in what is now Westchester County, extending west to the Hutchinson River and north to Mamaroneck. Thomas founded the town of Westchester at the head of navigation on Westchester Creek.

On October 6, 1666, Richard Nicolls, governor of the Province of New York under the Duke of York, "gave, granted and confirmed to Thomas Pell, Gentleman, all the land purchased from the Indian proprietors and created the same into an entire enfranchised township and manor."

=== Life in America ===
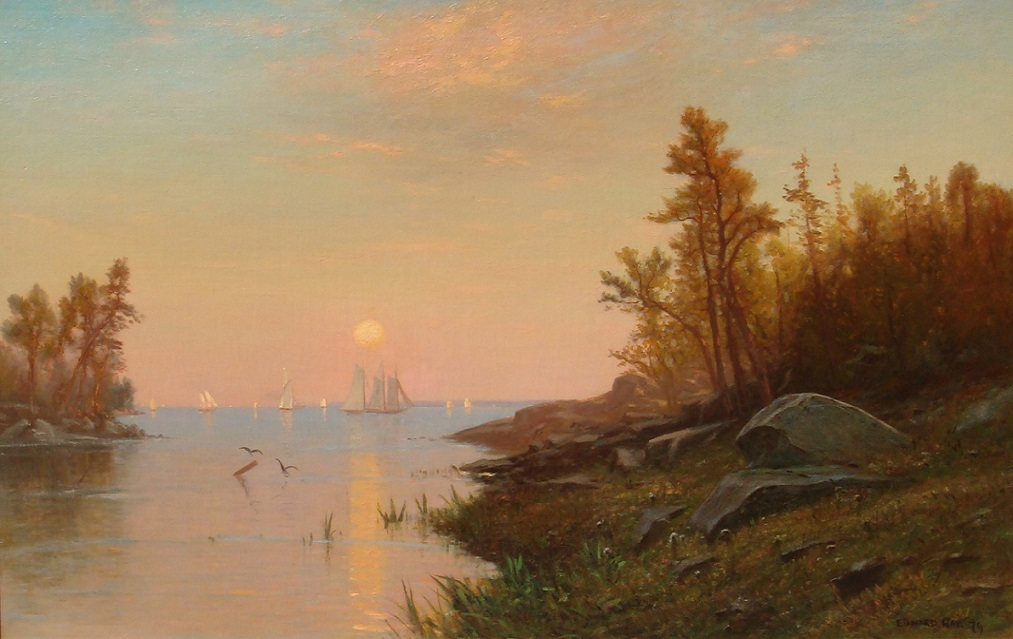
View of Long Island Sound, near Pelham Manor, by Edward Gay.

Upon the death of his uncle in 1669, who died without male heir, John inherited the whole of his estate, becoming the 2nd Lord of Pelham Manor, and sailed to New York, arriving in 1670, with a letter proving his claim from Lord Brereton to Governor John Winthrop of Connecticut.

Pell sold his uncle's lands in Fairfield, and settled in the Manor. He was appointed the first Judge of the Court of Common Pleas in 1688, and the first member of the New York General Assembly for Westchester in 1691, serving until 1695. He was commissioned Captain of Horse in 1684 and Major in 1692, and was a Vestryman and Warden in St. Peters Church.

In 1685, Pell sold off City Island, and the land grant was renewed in 1687 by Governor Thomas Dongan, 2nd Earl of Limerick as "The Lordship and Manor of Pelham." In 1689, Pell sold 6,000 acres (2,400 ha) of what eventually became the city of New Rochelle to Jacob Leisler and the French Huguenots. As partial payment, the Huguenots agreed to pay to Sir John, "the Lord of the Manor, the Pell heirs and assigns forever, one fatte calf."

== Personal life ==
In 1684, Pell was married to Rachel Pinckney, daughter of Dinton-born Phillip Pinckney II and Jane (née Phippen) Pinckney. Her father had first settled in Boston, then Fairfield before buying, with nine other men, a large tract of land called "Ten Farms" on the Hutchinson River (in what is now Westchester County) from his uncle Thomas Pell in 1664. In 1681, Pinckney became a captain in the local militia a commissioner of Eastchester in 1686 before selling his land to Nathan Gold in 1688. Together, Rachel and John were the parents of two sons and two daughters:

- Thomas Pell II (1686–1739), third Lord of Pelham Manor, who married Anna (or Ann), a granddaughter of Wampage I, Sachem of the Siwanoys, and Susanna Cole (daughter of William and Anne Hutchinson, who was killed during Kieft's War).
- Elizabeth Pell (1680–1778), who married Samuel Huestis.

Sir John Pell died around 1712 and was succeeded by his eldest son, Thomas Pell, who inherited 60,000 acres (24,000 ha) of land. The Pell family burial plot faced the Pelham Bay waterfront on the eastern side of the manor.

=== Descendants ===
Through his son Thomas, he was a grandfather of seven sons, including Joseph Pell (1715–1775), who became the 4th Lord of Pelham Manor upon Thomas' death. Each of Thomas' sons, Joseph, John, Thomas, Joshua, Philip, and Caleb Pell, received 10,000 acres (4,000 ha) of land upon his death. None of his sons had issue except John, who had six sons, who all died without issue, the last being Richard Moore Pell, who died at the Manor in 1868. The 4th Lords son, Thomas Pell (b. 1744), who married Margaret Bartow, was the last owner of the property, which later passed into the possession of the Bartow family.

== See also ==
- Bartow-Pell Mansion
