= Kate Benedict Harvey =

American heiress and philanthropist

Kate Benedict Harvey (née Hanna; December 26, 1871 – May 15, 1936) was an American heiress, philanthropist, and plantation owner.

== Biography ==
=== Early life ===
Hanna was born on December 26, 1871. She attended Miss Porter's School in Farmington, Connecticut and Miss Heloise E. Hersey's School in Boston, Massachusetts.

=== Inheritance and the Pebble Hill Plantation ===
She was an heiress to the M. A. Hanna Company fortune and one of its three biggest stockholders. She inherited the Pebble Hill Plantation in Thomasville, Georgia from her father, which she owned from 1901 to 1936. She commissioned Abram Garfield (1872–1958), son of President James A. Garfield, to design more buildings on the plantation, including the Log Cabin School, the Plantation Store, the Loggia Wing, the Pump House, the Waldorf and the lavish Cow Barn.

She raised Jersey cattle after she visited Jersey and sold their milk. Additionally, she entertained guests with horse riding, lawn tennis and baseball. By 1905, she had automobiles on the plantation. She also took trips to St. Marks, Florida and was a member of the Glen Arven Country Club (founded in 1892) in Thomasville. In 1934, the old house designed by architect John Wind (1819–1863) burned down, and she commissioned Abram Garfield to design a new house, built in 1936.

=== Philanthropy ===
In 1901, she founded the Visiting Nurse Association and served on its Board of Trustees. She also started the Visiting Nurses Quarterly. In 1905, she founded a new chapter of the American Red Cross in Cleveland, Ohio. She helped in the reconstruction of Lorain, Ohio after the tornado of 1924.

She donated to the Lakeside Hospital, where she served on the Board of Lady Managers from 1898 to 1930, and to the University Hospitals of Cleveland, where she served on the Board of Trustees from 1920 to 1936. She donated to the Rainbow Babies & Children's Hospital and spearheaded the Frances Payne Bolton School of Nursing at Case Western Reserve University.

=== Personal life ===
She married Robert Livingston Ireland (1867–1928), a son of John Busteed Ireland and a descendant of many prominent New York families. Together, Kate and Robert were the parents of a son and daughter:

- Robert Livingston Ireland, Jr. (1895–1981)
- Elisabeth Ireland Poe (1897–1978).

Her second marriage was to Perry Williams Harvey (1869–1932).

Kate Benedict Harvey died on May 15, 1936.
