= Wampage =

Native American Siwanoy chieftain (c. 1620–1680)

Wampage I
- Anhōōke

Siwanoy leader
- Succeeded by: Wampage II

Personal details
- Died: c. 1680
- Spouse(s): Prasque (Anne), daughter of Romaneck
- Children: Wampage II (Ninham-Wampage); John Wampage White
- Known for: Massacre of Anne Hutchinson
- Mother tongue: Munsee

Wampage I (/ˈwɒmpɒɡiː/), also called Anhōōke and later John White, was a Sagamore (Note: Although many historical sources refer to Wampage I as a "Sachem", the only title he was actually known to have used is "Saggamore" (sic), as this is the capacity in which he executed the 1654 treaty with Thomas Pell. This is consistent with the traditional use of the title by Algonquian tribes.) (or chieftain) of the Siwanoy Native Americans, who resided in the area now known as the Bronx and Westchester County, New York. He was involved in the murder of Anne Hutchinson and her fellow colonists in 1643.

Some time after 1636, he married Prasque, daughter of Romaneck, the paramount chief over the Wappinger "confederacy". The Siwanoys, one of the western bands of the Wappingers, were involved in Kieft's War and numerous disputes with the colony of New Netherland during Wampage's chieftaincy. He was later involved in a legal dispute with Connecticut Colony, which ultimately required Privy Council intervention. His name was variously spelled as Wamponneage, Wampage, Wampus and Wampers.

== Role in Hutchinson massacre ==
The Siwanoys, under the leadership of Wampage I, massacred the family of Anne Hutchinson in August 1643. It has been written that Wampage himself was the murderer of Hutchinson and that he adopted the name of Anhōōke due to a Mahican custom of taking the name of a notable person personally killed. The name "Anne's Hoeck" (or Ann Hook's Neck) came to refer to the land where the massacre was believed to have occurred - now called Rodman's Neck. Numerous sources also indicate that the lone survivor of the attack, Anne's daughter Susanna Hutchinson, bore a son to Wampage while in Siwanoy captivity - Ninham-Wampage, who would become Wampage II on his father's death.

== Treaty with Thomas Pell ==
Not long after the massacre, Wampage befriended Thomas Pell, then the Indian Commissioner at Fairfield, Connecticut. On June 27, 1654, 9,160 acres of land were sold by the Siwanoys to Pell, including portions of the Bronx and lands east of the Hutchinson River northward to Mamaroneck. Wampage and other Siwanoys signed a treaty under the Treaty Oak near Bartow Pell Mansion in Pelham. Wampage (as Anhōōke), along with Shāwānórōckquot, Poquōrūm, Wawhāmkus, and Mehúmōw, signed as "Saggamores". Cockho, Kamaque, and Cockinsecawa also signed as "Indyan Witnesses" to the "Articles of Agreement" section of the Treaty. The treaty also required that the Siwanoys and the English peacefully attempt to resolve boundary disputes over the land in the future.

On March 10, 1658, Wampage I and Pell negotiated the definitive treaty between the English and the Siwanoys, establishing their territorial claims, which would later keep Wampage and the Siwanoys out of King Philip's War.

== Later life ==
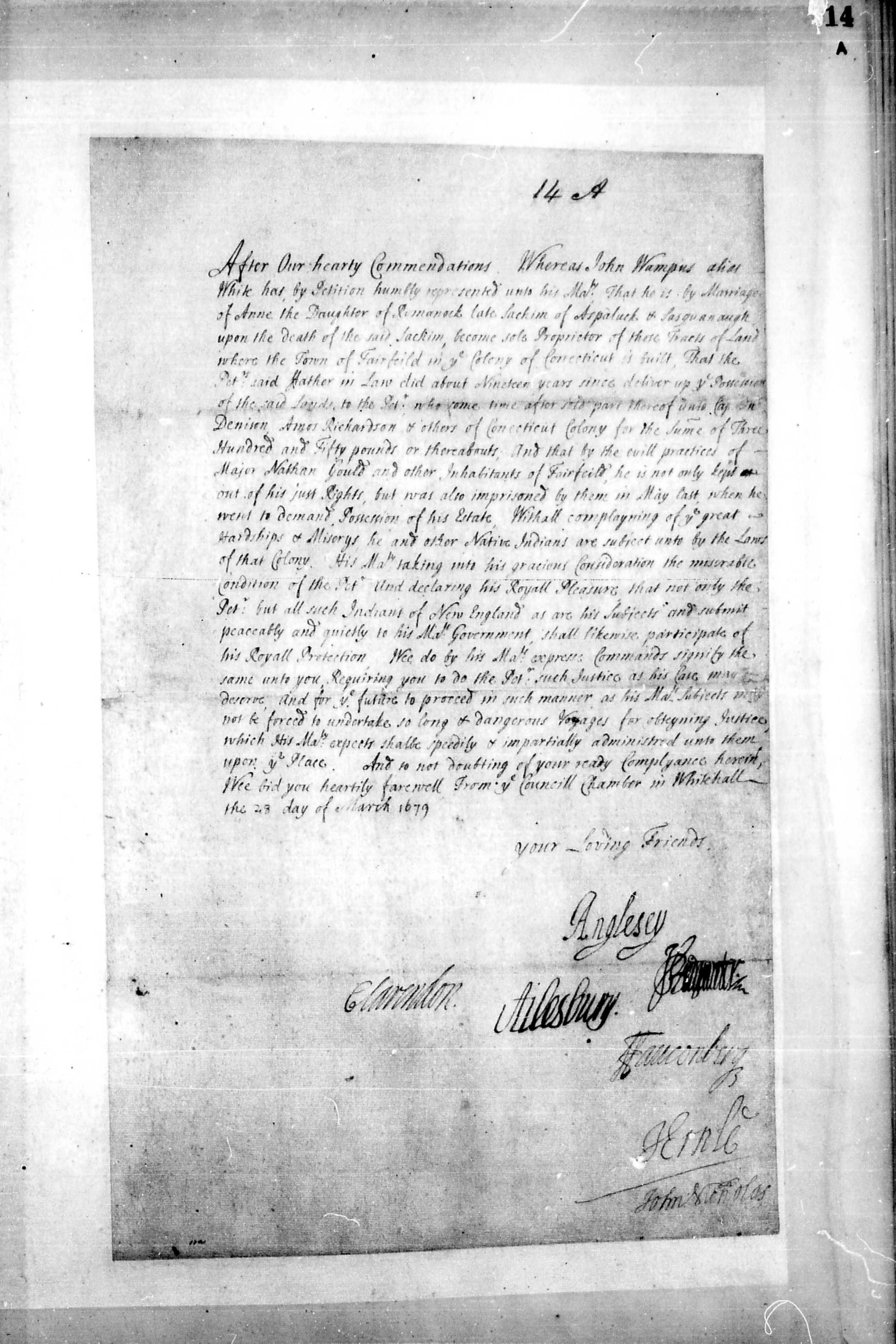
Privy Council ruling on Wampage I (John Wampus alias White)

Around 1677, the elderly Wampage went to Fairfield to collect on a bill of sale of lands to residents of the town, which lands he had inherited from his father in law, the late Romaneck. Nathan Gold, then Fairfield's chief magistrate, had Wampage beaten and thrown into jail. Gold argued that the English held all lands by right of conquest and that contracts between the English and Indians had no validity. Sir John Pell, the second Lord of Pelham Manor, intervened on Wampage's behalf, and represented him before the Privy Council of the United Kingdom. The Council ruled in Wampage's favor on March 28, 1679, denouncing Gold's "evill practices" and finding that "not only [Wampage] but all such Indians of New England as are [the British monarch's] Subjects and submit peaceably and quietly to his Government shall likewise participate of his Royall Protection".

By the time of the ruling, Wampage and Prasque had been baptized, taking the names of John and Anne White, respectively. The Privy Council's ruling referred to him as "John Wampus alias White" and to his wife as "Anne the Daughter of Romanock late Sachem of Aspatuck & Sasquanaugh". Wampage died shortly thereafter, prior to July 1681. While his place of burial is not definitively known, one source claimed that a mound on the northern coast of Rodman's Neck was Wampage's final resting place.

== Descendants ==
Wampage I was known to have fathered two children:

- Wampage II, or Ninham-Wampage, by tradition said to be his son by Susanna Hutchinson (not to be confused with Daniel Nimham). On the death of Wampage I, Ninham-Wampage inherited his father's title and became Wampage II, Sachem of Ann Hook. He appears to have also used a variation of Anhōōke as an alias; he used the name "Wampage, alias Ann-hook" when he and another Sachem, Maminepoe, deeded additional lands to the trustees of Westchester in 1692. (This has inevitably led to some sources confusing the father and son.) Sources indicate that Wampage II's daughter, Anna (or Ann), married Thomas Pell II, who was the third Lord of Pelham Manor. Anna grew up on Hunter Island.
- John Wampage White, his son by Prasque (Anne), daughter of Romaneck; John married Elizabeth French, and their children were Elizabeth (who married John Tompkins), Mary and Nathaniel White.

== See also ==
- Siwanoy
- Thomas Pell
- Anne Hutchinson
