= Stephen Hyatt Pell =

American banker (1874-1950)

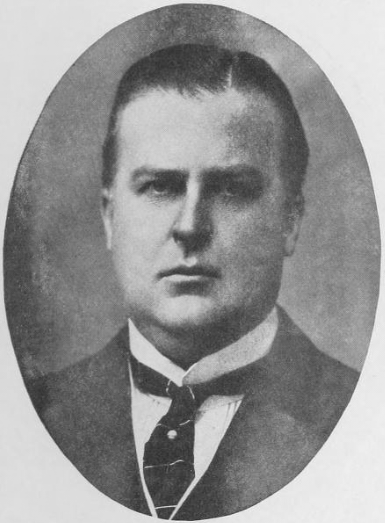
- Born: Stephen Hyatt Pelham Pell; February 3, 1874; Flushing Meadows, New York
- Died: June 22, 1950 (aged 76); Ticonderoga, New York, US
- Occupation: Banker
- Spouse: Sarah Gibbs Thompson

Stephen Hyatt Pelham Pell (February 3, 1874 – June 22, 1950) was an American banker, the son of John Howland Pell and Caroline Hyatt.

== Biography ==
He was born in Flushing Meadows, Queens, New York. Pell was married to Sarah Gibbs Thompson, the daughter of Robert Means Thompson, a mining investor and operator founder of the International Nickel Company, the forerunner of Vale Inco. Pell was a history enthusiast and collector who restored the ruins of Fort Ticonderoga.

He fathered two sons: Robert Thompson Pell (b. 1902) and John Howland Gibbs Pell (b. 1904).

From 1944 to 1949 Pell served as president of the American Numismatic Society.

He died in Ticonderoga, New York on June 22, 1950.

== See also ==
- Fort Ticonderoga

== Sources ==
- USGenNet: Stephen Hyatt Pell

== Bibliography ==
- Massachusetts Magazine: Pell Family Tree
- Schenectady Gazette: S.H.P. Pell Honorary Doctorate Union College
- Biography at the American Numismatic Society
