= Siwanoy =

Native American subtribe in New York (state)

- Map showing approximate location of known Siwanoy settlements

Total population
- extinct as a tribe; merged into the other Wappinger (late 17th century)

Regions with significant populations
- United States (New York)

Languages
- Munsee

Religion
- Indigenous religion

Related ethnic groups
- Wappinger, Lenape, Wecquaesgeek, Mahican

The Siwanoy (/ˈsaɪwənɔɪ/) were an Indigenous American band of Munsee-speaking people, who lived in Long Island Sound along the coasts of what are now The Bronx, Westchester County, New York, and Fairfield County, Connecticut. They were one of the western bands of the Wappinger Confederacy. By 1640, their territory (Wykagyl) extended from Hell Gate to Norwalk, Connecticut, and as far inland as White Plains; it became hotly contested between Dutch and English colonial interests.

== Name ==
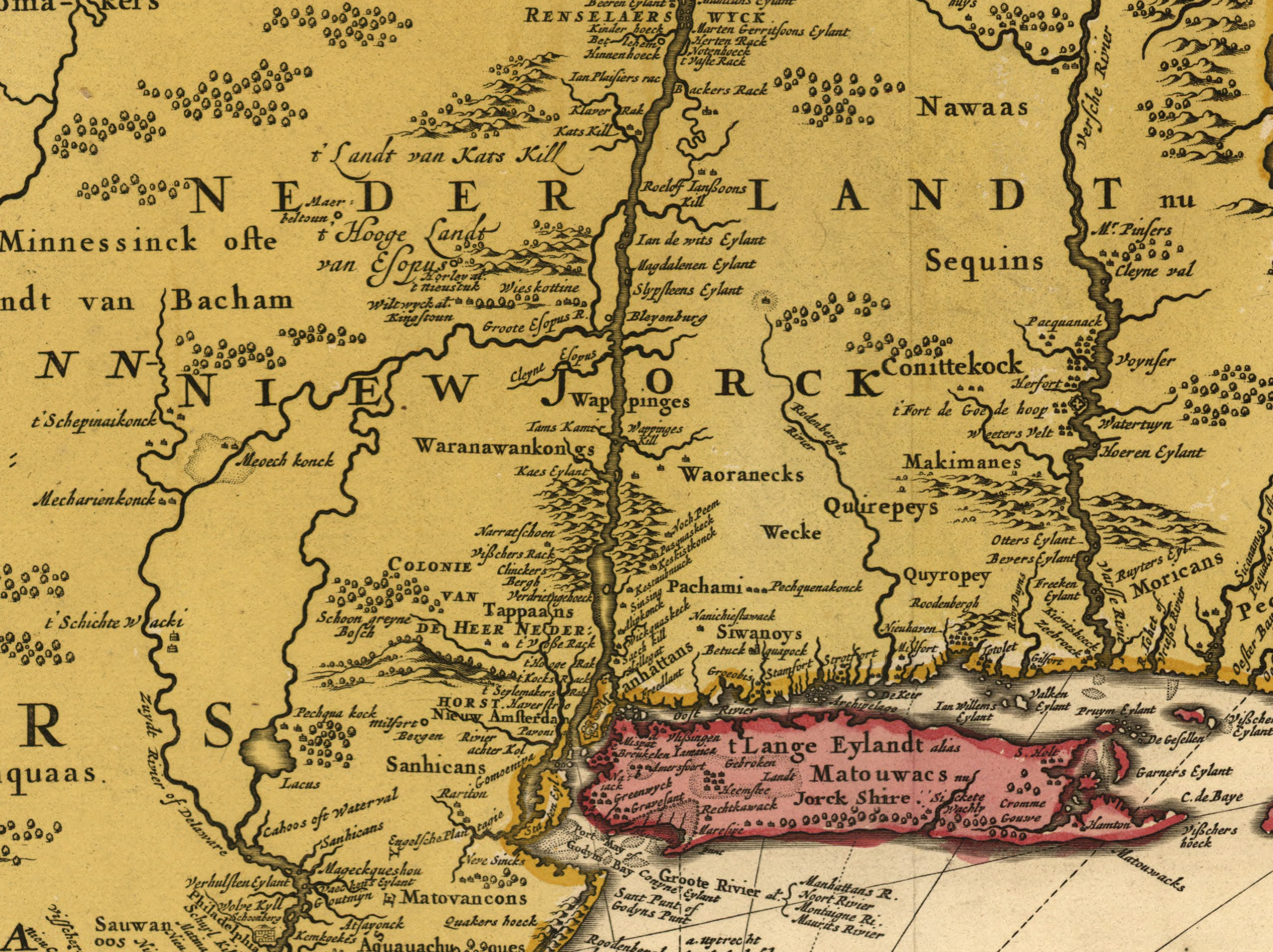
The Siwanoy are listed in southern Westchester County, New York, and westernmost Fairfield County, Connecticut on this excerpt of Novi Belgii Novæque Angliæ (Amsterdam, 1685).

The origin of the name Siwanoy is unknown. It appears at least as early in that spelling on the 1685 revision of a 1656 Dutch map, Novi Belgii Novæque Angliæ ("New Netherland and New England", and also parts of Virginia, by Petrus Schenk the Younger from an original by Nicolaes Visscher I.

The name Siwanoy may be a corruption of Siwanak, "salt people".

== Language ==
The Siwanoy spoke Munsee, a Delaware language, which was an Eastern Algonquian language. Nohham Cachat-Schilling of the Massachusetts Ethical Archaeology Society writes that the Siwaony might not have spoken Munsee but instead may have spoken Paugusset or another dialect.

== Culture ==
Like the greater Lenape, women typically wore their hair loose, whereas men would often remove all hair but a long forelock. They frequently painted their bodies and faces (black, red, yellow, blue, and white) for ceremonial rites, war, and festive occasions, or to mourn the dead. Wampum jewelry and belts were worn as a symbol of social status. The Siwanoy no doubt ate all varieties of fish and shellfish, as the shore had numerous fishing stations and a rich aquatic life; and the interior provided fruits, nuts, and animal life.

Their closest allies were the Lenape to the west and the Mahicans to the north, with whom they shared a totem (or emblem) – the “enchanted wolf”, with the right paw raised defiantly. They were also allied and shared a common lifestyle with the Wecquaesgeek. Like other tribes of the area, the Siwanoy were loosely organized into several groups, each with a sagamore (chieftain) and a somewhat-defined territory.

== Settlements ==
The Siwanoys' largest village in 1640 was Poningo, located near modern-day Rye. They also had stockade settlements at Ann Hook's Neck, Hunter Island, and Davenport Neck (Shippan), and “winter quarters” farther south at Hell Gate. They referred to the area surrounding Ann Hook's Neck and Hunter Island as Laaphawachking ("place of stringing beads"), because of the large quantities of wampum produced there.

The village of Nanichiestawack, or Nawchestaweck ("place of safety"), located near present-day Woods Bridge at Muscoot Reservoir, (Note: Although the village of Nanichiestawack was located north of the traditional extent of Siwanoy territory, between 500 and 700 Siwanoy and Wecquaesgeek people were killed there during the Pound Ridge massacre.) was destroyed during the Pound Ridge massacre in 1644.

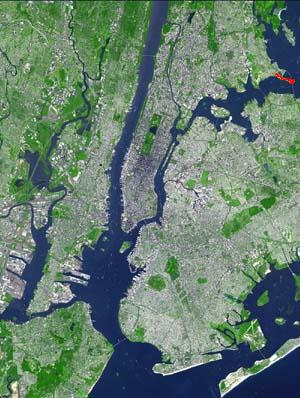
The geographic feature Throggs Neck, shown in red, in the Bronx

In the early 20th century, Alanson Skinner unearthed the Throgs Neck site, on the peninsula Throggs Neck, and sites at Clasons Point in the Bronx, which he identified as being once occupied by Siwanoy, as well as other peoples. Native people attacked a European ship from this site in 1619.

== Religion ==
Two glacial erratic boulders named Grey Mare and Mishow, located on Hunter Island, were spiritually significant to the Siwanoy. Here the Siwanoys practiced their sacred ceremonies, and two sachems are believed to be buried at Mishow; the Siwanoys believed the boulders to have been placed there by their guardian Manitou (the spiritual, omnipresent life force that manifests itself in everything). Many Siwanoys likely became Christianized; the Siwanoy sagamore Wampage I was one of these, taking John White as a baptismal name.

== 17th-century history ==
=== Conflict with European colonists ===
The western bands of the Wappinger, including the Siwanoy, were at war with the Dutch from 1640 to 1645. Part of this period is often referred to as Kieft's War, and is said to have cost the lives of some 1,600 Wappinger refugees. Thus, tensions between the colonists and the indigenous people of the area were extremely high at this time.

A group of Siwanoy, led by Wampage I, killed squatter Anne Hutchinson, six of her children, and nine others in August 1643, near Split Rock, an ancient landmark. The only survivor was Hutchinson's nine-year-old daughter, Susanna — possibly spared because of her red hair — who "became the wife of an Indian Chief, residing in a settlement near the Split Rock". It has been written that Wampage himself was the murderer of Hutchinson and that he adopted the name of Anhōōke due to a Mahican custom of taking the name of a notable person personally killed.

In February 1644, the entire village of Nanichiestawack was wiped out by 130 Dutch mercenaries under Capt. John Underhill. The surprise attack, known as the Pound Ridge massacre, took place while a large number of Siwanoy and Wecquaesgeek people were gathered together for a corn festival. The Dutch forces slaughtered between 500 and 700 Indigenous people, including women and children, who were forced into their homes and burned alive. That attack was called the Governor Keift War.

=== Treaty with Thomas Pell ===
On June 27, 1654, sagamores Shāwānórōckquot (Shanarockwell), Poquōrūm, Anhōōke (Wampage I), Wawhāmkus, and Mehúmōw deeded to Thomas Pell 9,160 acres of land east of the Hutchinson River northward to Mamaroneck, including modern day Pelham, New Rochelle, The Pelham Islands, and portions of The Bronx. The parties signed a treaty under the Treaty Oak near Bartow-Pell Mansion in Pelham. New Netherland authorities did not recognize his title, accusing the New Englanders of continued encroachment upon Dutch territory. In September 1664, the British Navy, supported by a militia invasion force consisting largely of City Island colonists and led by Pell himself, entered New Amsterdam and forced Peter Stuyvesant, the Dutch Governor of New Netherland, to surrender.

=== Merger and removal ===
Following the 1654 treaty, the Siwanoys remained in the area around Westchester County for another hundred years, and Robert T. Pell wrote they eventually "melted away" by intermarriage with the English settlers. Donald B. Ricky wrote that they, along with neighboring bands, migrated north and merged into other Wappinger tribes in the late 17th century. One of the last mentions of the Siwanoys as a distinct band was in Adriaen van der Donck's 1656 map.

== 18th- to 19th-century history ==
Some Siwanoy descendants continued to reside along the shore in Westchester County until 1756, when most of the Wappinger and Mahicans remaining in the area joined the Nanticoke, then living under the protection of the Haudenosaunee, and with them were eventually merged into the Lenape. Some of them joined the Stockbridge Indians, a Lenape people who were forcibly removed to Wisconsin in the 1830s.

== Descendants ==
The Stockbridge Munsee Community is a federally recognized tribe based in Wisconsin. The Delaware Nation and Delaware Tribe of Indians are both federally recognized tribes in Oklahoma. New York, New Jersey, and Delaware have state-recognized tribes that identify as Lenape descendants.

== Notable Siwanoys ==
- Wampage I, Anhōōke (died ca. 1680), chieftain at Ann Hook's Neck and present-day Hunter Island
- Wampage II (Ninham-Wampage/Ann Hook), chieftain on present-day Hunter Island circa 1700
- Ponus, chieftain at present-day Rye, New York, circa 1640; possible namesake of Poningo, the Siwanoy village located at Rye
- Shanarockwell (Shāwānórōckquot), chieftain at present-day Rye circa 1660
- Cokenseko, chieftain circa 1680; namesake of Kensico, New York
- Wappaquewam, chieftain at present-day Mamaroneck, New York, in 1661
- Mayn Mayano (Mianus), chieftain at present-day Greenwich, Connecticut circa 1640
- Wascussee, chieftain at Shippan (present-day Davenport Neck) in 1640
- Anna, daughter of Wampage II, who married Thomas Pell II, 3rd Lord of Pelham Manor (son of Sir John Pell)

== Notable Siwanoy descendants ==
- Claiborne Pell, U.S. Senator from Rhode Island; direct descendant of Wampage I
- Herbert Claiborne Pell IV, a candidate for Governor of Rhode Island; direct descendant of Wampage I

== See also ==
- Siwanoy Country Club
