= Thomas Pell =

American colonist (1608–1669)

Thomas Pell, 1st Lord of Pelham Manor (1608 – September 21, 1669) was an English-born physician who bought the area known as Pelham, New York, as well as land that now includes the eastern Bronx and southern Westchester County, New York, and founded the town of Westchester at the head of navigation on Westchester Creek in 1654.

== Early life ==
Coat of Arms of Thomas Pell

Pell was born in Sussex, England in 1608. He was the eldest of two sons born to the former Mary Holland, from Halden in Kent, and the Rev. John Pell, who was from Southwick, Sussex. His younger brother was the mathematician and political agent John Pell. His father died in 1616 and his mother died the following year.

He studied at Cambridge, but did not finish his course.

== Career ==
In the 1630s he emigrated to New England; he lived in Fairfield, Connecticut, as of 1654.

In 1654, Pell signed a treaty with Chief Wampage and other Siwanoy Indian tribal members that granted him 50,000 acres (20,000 ha) of tribal land in what is now the Bronx and Westchester County, extending west to the Hutchinson River and north to Mamaroneck. There are no contemporary records of the price he paid for the land, but an 1886 source states that the Siwanoy were paid with "sundry hogshead of Jamaica rum". He named the area Pelham in honor of Pelham Burton, who had been his tutor in England.

Pell was legally challenged by the Dutch courts, who considered the "English were trespassing on Dutch territory". This dispute was finally resolved by Pell in September 1664 when the British Navy, supported by a militia invasion force consisting largely of City Island colonists and led by Pell himself, entered New Amsterdam and forced Peter Stuyvesant, the Dutch Governor of New Netherland, to surrender the colony to the British.

== Personal life ==
Pell died on September 21, 1669, in Fairfield, Connecticut. Having no children, he left his estate to a nephew, Sir John Pell (1643–1702), son of Thomas's only brother John. His nephew traveled from England to New York and took up residence as the 2nd Lord of the manor of Pelham.

The Pell family lived in this area until the Revolutionary War and has remained prominent to the present, with family members including U.S. Ambassador Herbert Pell, U.S. Senator Claiborne Pell, and preservationist Stephen Hyatt Pell. Thomas Pell's grandson Philip Pell II built Pelhamdale at Pelham Manor about 1750. The Census of slaves, conducted in the Province of New York in 1755, lists 24 enslaved individuals in Pelham Manor.
