= Edgewood =

Edgewood may refer to:

== Places ==
=== Canada ===
- Edgewood, British Columbia, a settlement

=== United States ===
==== Cities and towns ====
- Edgewood, California, a census-designated place
- Edgewood, Florida, a city
- Edgewood, Illinois, a village in Effingham County
- Edgewood, Indiana, a town
- Edgewood, Iowa, a city
- Edgewood, Kentucky, a home rule–class city
- Edgewood, Maryland, an unincorporated community and census-designated place
- Edgewood, Minnesota, an unincorporated community
- Edgewood, Missouri, an unincorporated community
- Edgewood, Nevada, an abandoned townsite
- Edgewood, New Mexico, a town
- Edgewood, New York, a hamlet
- Edgewood, Ohio, a census-designated place
- Edgewood, Allegheny County, Pennsylvania, a borough
- Edgewood, Northumberland County, Pennsylvania, a census-designated place
- Edgewood, Texas, a city
- Edgewood, Washington, a city
- Edgewood, West Virginia, an unincorporated community

==== Neighborhoods ====
- Edgewood (New Haven), Connecticut
- Edgewood (Atlanta), Georgia
- Edgewood, Columbus, Georgia
- Edgewood, Louisville, Kentucky
- Edgewood (Cranston), Rhode Island
- Edgewood (Washington, D.C.)

==== National Register of Historic Places ====
- Edgewood (Montgomery, Alabama), listed on the NRHP in Alabama
- Edgewood (Bardstown, Kentucky), listed on the NRHP in Kentucky
- Edgewood (Versailles, Kentucky), listed on the NRHP in Kentucky
- Edgewood (Farmerville, Louisiana), listed on the NRHP in Louisiana
- Edgewood (Frederick, Maryland), listed on the NRHP in Maryland
- Edgewood (Natchez, Mississippi), listed on the NRHP in Mississippi
- Edgewood (Grassy Creek, North Carolina), listed on the NRHP in North Carolina
- Edgewood (Birmingham Township, Chester County, Pennsylvania), listed on the NRHP in Pennsylvania
- Edgewood, 1818 (Amherst, Virginia), 138 Garland Avenue, listed on the NRHP in Virginia
- Edgewood, 1858 (Amherst, Virginia), 591 Puppy Creek Road, listed on the NRHP in Virginia
- Edgewood (Stanleytown, Virginia), listed on the NRHP in Virginia
- Edgewood (Wingina, Virginia), listed on the NRHP in Virginia
- Edgewood (Bunker Hill, West Virginia), listed on the NRHP in West Virginia
- Edgewood Historic District (disambiguation)
- Edgewood House (Pelham Manor, New York), listed on the NRHP in New York
- Edgewood Manor, Clarksburg, West Virginia, listed on the NRHP in West Virginia
- Edgewood Plantation (disambiguation)

== Schools ==
- Edgewood, a University of KwaZulu-Natal campus in Pinetown, South Africa
- Edgewood University, a private Dominican university in Madison, Wisconsin
- Edgewood High School (disambiguation)
- Edgewood Academy, a non-profit non-sectarian independent school in Elmore, Alabama
- Edgewood Middle School, West Covina, California
- Edgewood Magnet School, New Haven, Connecticut
- Edgewood School of Domestic Arts, Iowa Falls, Iowa, originally a school for girls and women, now consisting of apartments and meeting places
- Edgewood Elementary School (disambiguation)

== Sports and recreation ==
- Edgewood Stakes, a Grade II American Thoroughbred horse race
- Edgewood Country Club, a private golf, tennis, and social club in Churchill, Pennsylvania
- Edgewood Yacht Club, Cranston, Rhode Island, on the National Register of Historic Places

== Transportation ==
- Edgewood station (disambiguation), stations of the name
- Edgewood Avenue, Atlanta, Georgia, United States
- Edgewood Cutoff, a single-track railroad line in southern Illinois and western Kentucky

== Other uses ==
- Edgewood Chemical Activity, Edgwood, Maryland, a former US Army chemical weapons depot
- Edgewood State Hospital, a former tubercular/psychiatric hospital complex in Deer Park, New York
- SS Edgewood, original name of USS Denebola (AD-12), a US Navy destroyer tender

== See also ==
- Edgewood Park (disambiguation)
- Edgewood Lake (Alabama)
- Edgewood Lake (Rhode Island)
