= Edgewood House =

Edgewood House may refer to:

- Edgewood House (Pelham Manor, New York), listed on the NRHP in New York
- Edgewood Manor, Clarksburg, West Virginia, listed on the NRHP in West Virginia

== See also ==
- Edgewood Historic District (disambiguation)
- Edgewood (disambiguation)
