= 1992–93 NFL playoffs =

American football tournament

- Dates: January 2–31, 1993
- Season: 1992
- Teams: 12
- Games played: 11
- Super Bowl XXVII site: Rose Bowl; Pasadena, California
- Defending champions: Washington Redskins
- Champion: Dallas Cowboys (3rd title)
- Runner-up: Buffalo Bills
- Conference runners-up: Miami Dolphins; San Francisco 49ers
NFL playoffs
← 1991–92	1993–94 →

The National Football League playoffs for the 1992 season began on January 2, 1993. The postseason tournament concluded with the Dallas Cowboys defeating the Buffalo Bills in Super Bowl XXVII, 52–17, on January 31, at the Rose Bowl in Pasadena, California.

== Participants ==
Within each conference, the three division winners and the three non-division winners with the best overall regular season records qualified for the playoffs. The three division winners were seeded 1–3 based on the overall won-lost-tied record, and the three wild card teams were seeded 4–6. The NFL did not use a fixed bracket playoff system, and there were no restrictions regarding teams from the same division matching up in any round. In the first round, dubbed the wild-card playoffs or wild-card weekend, the third-seeded division winner hosted the sixth seed wild card, and the fourth seed hosted the fifth. The 1 and 2 seeds from each conference received a first-round bye. In the second round, the divisional playoffs, the number 1 seed hosted the worst-remaining seed from the first round (seed 4, 5, or 6), while the number 2 seed played the other team (seed 3, 4, or 5). The two winning teams from each conference's divisional playoff games then meet in the respective AFC and NFC Conference Championship games, hosted by the higher seed. Although the Super Bowl, the championship round of the playoffs, was played at a neutral site, the designated home team was based on an annual rotation by conference.

Playoff seeds
Seed	AFC	NFC
1	Pittsburgh Steelers (Central winner)	San Francisco 49ers (West winner)
2	Miami Dolphins (East winner)	Dallas Cowboys (East winner)
3	San Diego Chargers (West winner)	Minnesota Vikings (Central winner)
4	Buffalo Bills (wild card)	New Orleans Saints (wild card)
5	Houston Oilers (wild card)	Philadelphia Eagles (wild card)
6	Kansas City Chiefs (wild card)	Washington Redskins (wild card)

== Bracket ==
Jan 3 – Rich Stadium	Jan 9 – Three Rivers Stadium
5	Houston	38
4	Buffalo	24
4	Buffalo	41*	Jan 17 – Joe Robbie Stadium
1	Pittsburgh	3
AFC
Jan 2 – Jack Murphy Stadium	4	Buffalo	29
Jan 10 – Joe Robbie Stadium
2	Miami	10
6	Kansas City	0	AFC Championship
3	San Diego	0
3	San Diego	17	Jan 31 – Rose Bowl
2	Miami	31
Wild Card playoffs
Divisional playoffs
Jan 3 – Louisiana Superdome	A4	Buffalo	17
Jan 10 – Texas Stadium
N2	Dallas	52
5	Philadelphia	36	Super Bowl XXVII
5	Philadelphia	10
4	New Orleans	20	Jan 17 – Candlestick Park
2	Dallas	34
NFC
Jan 2 – Hubert H. Humphrey Metrodome	2	Dallas	30
Jan 9 – Candlestick Park
1	San Francisco	20
6	Washington	24	NFC Championship
6	Washington	13
3	Minnesota	7
1	San Francisco	20

* Indicates overtime victory.

== Schedule ==
In the United States, ABC broadcast the first two Wild Card playoff games. CBS then televised the rest of the NFC games. NBC broadcast the rest of the AFC playoff games and Super Bowl XXVII.

Round	Away team	Score	Home team	Date	Kickoff (ET / UTC−5)	TV
Wild-card round	Washington Redskins	24–7	Minnesota Vikings	January 2, 1993	12:30 p.m.	ABC
Wild-card round	Kansas City Chiefs	0–17	San Diego Chargers	January 2, 1993	4:00 p.m.	ABC
Wild-card round	Houston Oilers	38–41 (OT)	Buffalo Bills	January 3, 1993	12:30 p.m.	NBC
Wild-card round	Philadelphia Eagles	36–20	New Orleans Saints	January 3, 1993	4:00 p.m.	CBS
Divisional round	Buffalo Bills	24–3	Pittsburgh Steelers	January 9, 1993	12:30 p.m.	NBC
Divisional round	Washington Redskins	13–20	San Francisco 49ers	January 9, 1993	4:00 p.m.	CBS
Divisional round	Philadelphia Eagles	10–34	Dallas Cowboys	January 10, 1993	12:30 p.m.	CBS
Divisional round	San Diego Chargers	0–31	Miami Dolphins	January 10, 1993	4:00 p.m.	NBC
Conference championships	Buffalo Bills	29–10	Miami Dolphins	January 17, 1993	12:30 p.m.	NBC
Conference championships	Dallas Cowboys	30–20	San Francisco 49ers	January 17, 1993	4:00 p.m.	CBS
Super Bowl XXVII Rose Bowl Pasadena, California	Buffalo Bills	17–52	Dallas Cowboys	January 31, 1993	6:25 p.m.	NBC

== Wild-card round ==
=== Saturday, January 2, 1993 ===
==== NFC: Washington Redskins 24, Minnesota Vikings 7 ====
Washington Redskins vs. Minnesota Vikings – Game summary

Quarter	1	2	3	4	Total
Redskins	3	14	7	0	24
Vikings	7	0	0	0	7

at Hubert H. Humphrey Metrodome, Minneapolis, Minnesota

- Game time: 12:30 p.m. EST/11:30 a.m. CST
- Game weather: Played indoors, domed stadium
- Game attendance: 57,353
- Referee: Gordon McCarter
- TV announcers (ABC): Al Michaels (play-by-play), Frank Gifford, and Dan Dierdorf (color commentators)
- Recap, Game Book

Game information

First quarter

- MIN – Terry Allen 1-yard run (Fuad Reveiz kick). Vikings 7–0.
- WAS – Chip Lohmiller 44-yard field goal. Vikings 7–3.

Second quarter

- WAS – Earnest Byner 3-yard run (Chip Lohmiller kick). Redskins 10–7.
- WAS – Brian Mitchell 8-yard run (Chip Lohmiller kick). Redskins 17–7.

Third quarter

- WAS – Gary Clark 24-yard pass from Mark Rypien (Chip Lohmiller kick). Redskins 24–7.

Fourth quarter

- No scoring plays.

Top passers

- WAS – Mark Rypien – 16/24, 172 yards, TD, INT
- MIN – Sean Salisbury – 6/20, 113 yards, 2 INT

Top rushers

- WAS – Brian Mitchell – 16 rushes, 109 yards, TD
- MIN – Terry Allen – 10 rushes, 48 yards, TD

Top receivers

- WAS – Gary Clark – 6 receptions, 91 yards, TD
- MIN – Cris Carter – 3 receptions, 77 yards

Although Minnesota scored on their opening drive of the game, they were quickly crushed by the Redskins, who massively outgained them in total yards 358–148, rushing yards 162–75, and time of possession 42:43 to 17:17. Vikings quarterback Sean Salisbury was held to just six of 20 completions, intercepted twice, and sacked four times (three by defensive end Fred Stokes).

The Vikings scored first on a 74-yard opening drive, featuring a 42-yard completion from Salisbury to Cris Carter, that ended with Terry Allen's 1-yard touchdown run. However, Washington controlled the game from that point on. Redskins Martin Mayhew's 44-yard interception return set up their first score on Chip Lohmiller's 44-yard field goal with 53 seconds left in the first quarter. Then less than five minutes into the second quarter, Redskins safety Brad Edwards picked off a pass from Salisbury and returned it six yards to the Vikings 33, and Washington cashed in on this turnover with Earnest Byner's 3-yard rushing touchdown, giving them a 10–7 lead.

Late in the second quarter, the Redskins faced fourth down and 4 at the Minnesota 44-yard line. Running back Brian Mitchell rushed for 38 yards on a fake punt to give the team a first down, and later finished the drive with an 8-yard touchdown run. Quarterback Mark Rypien's 24-yard touchdown pass to wide receiver Gary Clark in the third quarter closed out the scoring.

Mitchell, who had only 24 career rushing attempts coming into this game, led the Redskins with 109 rushing yards and 100 total yards on receptions and punt/kickoff returns.

This was the fifth postseason meeting between the Redskins and Vikings. Both teams have split the previous four meetings.

Previous playoff games
Tied 2–2 in all-time playoff games

1973

Washington Redskins 20 @ Minnesota Vikings 27

1973 NFC Divisional playoffs

1976

Washington Redskins 20 @ Minnesota Vikings 35

1976 NFC Divisional playoffs

1982

Minnesota Vikings 7 @ Washington Redskins 21

1982 NFC Second Round playoffs

1987

Minnesota Vikings 10 @ Washington Redskins 17

1987 NFC Championship Game

==== AFC: San Diego Chargers 17, Kansas City Chiefs 0 ====
Kansas City Chiefs vs. San Diego Chargers – Game summary

Quarter	1	2	3	4	Total
Chiefs	0	0	0	0	0
Chargers	0	0	10	7	17

at Jack Murphy Stadium, San Diego, California

- Game time: 4:00 p.m. EST/1:00 p.m. PST
- Game weather: 62 °F (17 °C), rain
- Game attendance: 58,278
- Referee: Dick Hantak
- TV announcers (ABC): Brent Musburger (play-by-play) and Dick Vermeil (color commentator)

Game information

First quarter

- No scoring plays.

Second quarter

- No scoring plays.

Third quarter

- SD – Marion Butts 54-yard run (John Carney kick). Chargers 7–0.
- SD – John Carney 34-yard field goal. Chargers 10–0.

Fourth quarter

- SD – Steve Hendrickson 5-yard run (John Carney kick). Chargers 17–0.

Top passers

- KC – Dave Krieg – 16/34, 233 yards, 2 INT
- SD – Stan Humphries – 14/23, 199 yards

Top rushers

- KC – Harvey Williams – 12 rushes, 35 yards
- SD – Marion Butts – 15 rushes, 119 yards, TD

Top receivers

- KC – J. J. Birden – 4 receptions, 78 yards
- SD – Derrick Walker – 3 receptions, 60 yards

San Diego entered this game as the first NFL team ever to make the playoffs after starting the season 0–4, and went on to shut out the Chiefs, outgaining them in total yards 342–251 and rushing yards 192–61. Kansas City never moved the ball farther than the Chargers 34-yard line. This was San Diego's first playoff win since the 1982 season.

The game remained scoreless until 5:53 remained in the third quarter when the Chargers faced second and 2. On the next play, running back Marion Butts took a pitch, ran through a large hole in the right side of the line, evaded a tackle attempt from safety Charles Mincy, and outraced the rest of the defense for a 54-yard rushing touchdown.

Leslie O'Neal intercepted a pass from Dave Krieg at the Chiefs 26-yard line on Kansas City's next drive to set up kicker John Carney's 34-yard field goal. In the final quarter the Chargers put the game away with a 90-yard drive, featuring a 44-yard completion from Stan Humphries to Anthony Miller (Miller fumbled at the end, but it was recovered by running back Ronnie Harmon, who gained an additional 11 yards). Linebacker Steve Hendrickson, who lined up as a running back, finished the drive with a 5-yard touchdown run.

In addition to his interception, O'Neal also had two sacks. Chargers defensive ends Shawn Lee and Burt Grossman also had 4.5 sacks between them (two for Lee, 2.5 for Grossman). Butts finished the game with 119 rushing yards and a touchdown on just 15 carries, along with two receptions for 17 yards. Humphries threw for 199 yards without any interceptions.

This was the first postseason meeting between the Chiefs and Chargers.

=== Sunday, January 3, 1993 ===
==== AFC: Buffalo Bills 41, Houston Oilers 38 (OT) ====
Houston Oilers vs. Buffalo Bills – Game summary

Quarter	1	2	3	4	OT	Total
Oilers	7	21	7	3	0	38
Bills	3	0	28	7	3	41

at Rich Stadium, Orchard Park, New York

- Game time: 12:30 p.m. EST
- Game weather: 45 °F (7 °C), cloudy
- Game attendance: 75,141
- Referee: Gerald Austin
- TV announcers (NBC (blacked out locally)): Charlie Jones (play-by-play) and Todd Christensen (color commentator)
- Box score

Game information

First quarter

- HOU – Haywood Jeffires 3-yard pass from Warren Moon (Al Del Greco kick). Oilers 7–0.
- BUF – Steve Christie 36-yard field goal. Oilers 7–3.

Second quarter

- HOU – Webster Slaughter 7-yard pass from Warren Moon (Al Del Greco kick). Oilers 14–3.
- HOU – Curtis Duncan 26-yard pass from Warren Moon (Al Del Greco kick). Oilers 21–3.
- HOU – Haywood Jeffires 27-yard pass from Warren Moon (Al Del Greco kick). Oilers 28–3.

Third quarter

- HOU – Bubba McDowell 58-yard interception return (Al Del Greco kick). Oilers 35–3.
- BUF – Kenneth Davis 1-yard run (Steve Christie kick). Oilers 35–10.
- BUF – Don Beebe 38-yard pass from Frank Reich (Steve Christie kick). Oilers 35–17.
- BUF – Andre Reed 26-yard pass from Frank Reich (Steve Christie kick). Oilers 35–24.
- BUF – Andre Reed 18-yard pass from Frank Reich (Steve Christie kick). Oilers 35–31.

Fourth quarter

- BUF – Andre Reed 17-yard pass from Frank Reich (Steve Christie kick). Bills 38–35.
- HOU – Al Del Greco 26-yard field goal. Tied 38–38.

Overtime

- BUF – Steve Christie 32-yard field goal. Bills 41–38.

Top passers

- HOU – Warren Moon – 36/50, 371 yards, 4 TD, 2 INT
- BUF – Frank Reich – 21/34, 289 yards, 4 TD, INT

Top rushers

- HOU – Lorenzo White – 19 rushes, 75 yards
- BUF – Kenneth Davis – 13 rushes, 68 yards, TD

Top receivers

- HOU – Ernest Givens – 9 receptions, 117 yards
- BUF – Andre Reed – 8 receptions, 136 yards, 3 TD

Known as The Comeback, the Bills mounted what was then the greatest comeback in NFL history, overcoming a 35–3 (32-point) deficit against the Oilers. The Bills were without future Hall of Fame quarterback Jim Kelly (who was injured in the last game of the season, a loss to the Oilers) and All-Pro linebacker Cornelius Bennett, and they lost Hall of Fame running back Thurman Thomas to a hip injury in the second half.

Houston dominated the game early, as quarterback Warren Moon completed 19 of 22 passes for 220 yards and four touchdowns in the first half, while the Oilers held the ball for 21:12, keeping the Bills' high-powered offense off the field for most of the first two quarters. On the opening drive of the first quarter, Moon completed six of seven passes on an 80-yard scoring drive that took over nine minutes off the clock and ended it with his first touchdown throw to wide receiver Haywood Jeffires for three yards to give the Oilers a 7–0 lead. Buffalo responded on their ensuing drive, as Kenneth Davis returned the kickoff 33 yards to the 44-yard line. Frank Reich subsequently led the Bills to the Oilers 18-yard line where Steve Christie made a 36-yard field goal, to cut the score to 7–3. But Moon struck right back, leading the Oilers on a second quarter scoring drive that was nearly identical to their first one, completing six of seven passes on another 80-yard drive and finishing it with a 7-yard touchdown pass to Webster Slaughter. Then after forcing the Bills to a three-and-out, Moon threw a 26-yard touchdown pass to Curtis Duncan. Later on, with 1:15 left in the half, the Oilers drove for another touchdown, aided by an encroachment call against the Bills on fourth down and 1. Moon completed the drive with his second touchdown pass to Jeffires, this one a 27-yarder, and the Oilers went into their locker room with a 28–3 halftime lead.

1:41 into the third quarter, Reich threw a pass that bounced off the hands of tight end Keith McKeller and Bubba McDowell returned the interception 58 yards for a touchdown, increasing the Houston lead to 35–3. However, on the kickoff, the wind shifted the ball just before it was kicked by Al Del Greco. As a result, it became an unintentional squib kick that the Bills recovered with great field position at midfield. Buffalo then drove 50 yards in 10 plays, including a 24-yard pass to tight end Pete Metzelaars that went right through the hands of linebacker Eddie Robinson, and scored with a 1-yard touchdown run by Davis, cutting the deficit to 35–10. On the drive, Reich completed a 16-yard pass to Andre Reed, while Davis kept the drive going with a 5-yard run on fourth down and 2 before finishing it off with a touchdown run with 8:52 left in the third quarter.

Christie then recovered his own onside kick and the Bills scored on the fourth play of their ensuing drive with Reich's 38-yard touchdown pass to wide receiver Don Beebe. One of Beebe's feet went partially out of bounds during the run before he made the catch, and it should have been ruled by the officials as an illegal touching of the football; this was pointed out on ESPN's "NFL Primetime" postgame recap as well as by Todd Christensen on the NBC broadcast. This made the score 35–17 with 7:46 left in the third quarter.

Houston was then forced to punt for the first time in the game on their next drive, and Greg Montgomery's 25-yard kick gave Buffalo the ball at their own 41-yard line. Reich started out the ensuing drive with an 18-yard completion to James Lofton. Davis gained 20 yards on a screen pass and then Reich threw a 26-yard touchdown pass to Reed, trimming the lead to 35–24. Then on the first play of the Oilers' ensuing possession, Moon's pass was tipped off the hands of Slaughter; Bills' safety Henry Jones intercepted the pass from Moon and returned it 15 yards to the Houston 23-yard line. Three plays later, Buffalo faced fourth down and five on the 18-yard line. Rather than attempt a field goal, Reich connected with Reed for the touchdown. With the score (including the extra point), the Bills had cut their deficit from 32 points to four in a span of just 6:52. On the Oilers' next drive, linebacker Darryl Talley forced a fumble from Moon while sacking him. Houston recovered the fumble, but they were forced to punt, and Montgomery's 24-yard kick gave Buffalo the ball at its 48-yard line.

This time, the Bills could not take advantage of their excellent starting field position and had to punt. Moon's run and shoot offense began to move the ball effectively again. Despite two sacks by Jeff Wright on the drive, Houston reached the Buffalo 14-yard line. Del Greco attempted a field goal to increase the Oilers' lead, but Montgomery fumbled the snap and Talley recovered the ball on the 26-yard line. After two plays, the Bills faced third down and four. With Houston's defense dropping back and expecting a pass, Reich handed the ball off to Davis, who stormed through the line and took off for a 35-yard gain. Then Reich went back to passing the ball, completing a short pass to Reed at the Oilers' 17-yard line on third down and two for the first down. With just 3:08 left in the fourth quarter, Reich threw a 17-yard touchdown pass to Reed, giving Buffalo its first lead of the game 38–35 (after the extra point); for the first time all season, the Houston defense (ninth in fewest points allowed that season) had allowed over 29 points. But Moon led Houston downfield on a 63-yard drive to score the tying 26-yard field goal from Del Greco to send the game into overtime. A key play on the drive was an 18-yard completion to Slaughter on fourth down and four from the Bills' 34-yard line.

Houston won the coin toss and got the ball at its 20-yard line. Three plays later, Moon was intercepted by Nate Odomes, enabling Christie to kick a field goal and win the game.

Reich finished the game completing 21 of 34 passes for 289 yards, four touchdowns, and an interception. Reed had eight catches for 136 yards and three touchdowns. Davis rushed for 68 yards and a touchdown, while also catching two passes for 25 yards and returning a kickoff for 33 yards. Moon completed 36 of 50 attempts for 371 yards and four touchdowns, with two interceptions. His 36 completions set a playoff record that would stand until broken by Drew Brees's 39 completions in 2010 (Brees's New Orleans Saints also lost that game). Givens caught nine passes for 117 yards. Jeffires recorded eight catches for 98 yards and two touchdowns.

This was the second postseason meeting between the Oilers and Bills. Buffalo won the only prior meeting.

Previous playoff games
Buffalo leads 1–0 in all-time playoff games

1988

Houston Oilers 10 @ Buffalo Bills 17

1988 AFC Divisional playoffs

==== NFC: Philadelphia Eagles 36, New Orleans Saints 20 ====
Philadelphia Eagles vs. New Orleans Saints – Game summary

Quarter	1	2	3	4	Total
Eagles	7	0	3	26	36
Saints	7	10	3	0	20

at Louisiana Superdome, New Orleans, Louisiana

- Game time: 4:00 p.m. EST/3:00 p.m. CST
- Game weather: Played indoors, domed stadium
- Game attendance: 68,591
- Referee: Dale Hamer
- TV announcers (CBS): Pat Summerall (play-by-play) and John Madden (color commentator)

Game information

First quarter

- NO – Craig Heyward 1-yard run (Morten Andersen kick). Saints 7–0.
- PHI – Fred Barnett 57-yard pass from Randall Cunningham (Roger Ruzek kick). Tied 7–7.

Second quarter

- NO – Morten Andersen 35-yard field goal. Saints 10–7.
- NO – Quinn Early 7-yard pass from Bobby Hebert (Morten Andersen kick). Saints 17–7.

Third quarter

- NO – Morten Andersen 42-yard field goal. Saints 20–7.

Fourth quarter

- PHI – Roger Ruzek 40-yard field goal. Saints 20–10.
- PHI – Fred Barnett 35-yard pass from Randall Cunningham (Roger Ruzek kick). Saints 20–17.
- PHI – Heath Sherman 6-yard run (Roger Ruzek kick). Eagles 24–20.
- PHI – Safety, Reggie White sacked Bobby Hebert in end zone. Eagles 26–20.
- PHI – Roger Ruzek 39-yard field goal. Eagles 29–20.
- PHI – Eric Allen 18-yard interception return (Roger Ruzek kick). Eagles 36–20.

Top passers

- PHI – Randall Cunningham – 19/35, 219 yards, 2 TD
- NO – Bobby Hebert – 23/39, 291 yards, TD, 3 INT

Top rushers

- PHI – Heath Sherman – 21 rushes, 105 yards, TD
- NO – Vaughn Dunbar – 4 rushes, 28 yards

Top receivers

- PHI – Fred Barnett – 4 receptions, 102 yards, 2 TD
- NO – Quinn Early – 7 receptions, 93 yards, TD

The Eagles overcame a 20–10 Saints lead late in the third quarter by scoring 26 points in the final quarter, just one point short of the NFL postseason record set by the New York Giants in 1934.

New Orleans scored after a 25-yard reception from Craig Heyward and an Eagles pass interference penalty that moved the ball to the 1-yard line set up Heyward's 1-yard touchdown run, but it was countered with Philadelphia quarterback Randall Cunningham's 57-yard touchdown pass to wide receiver Fred Barnett. The Saints then drove 71 yards in 13 plays to take a 10–7 lead on Morten Andersen's 35-yard field goal. Later on, they drove 53 yards in four plays to go up 17–7 on wide receiver Quinn Early's 7-yard touchdown reception from quarterback Bobby Hebert.

On the Saints' first drive of the third quarter, running back Vaughn Dunbar caught a short pass from Hebert and ran it 35 yards to the Eagles' 34. But when faced with 3rd and 1 from the 25, Dunbar was tackled at the line and ruled short of a first down, causing New Orleans to settle for Andersen's 42-yard field goal that put them up 20–7. New Orleans quickly forced a punt, but after they got the ball back, Hebert overthrew Early on a deep post pass, sending the ball right into the arms of Eagles cornerback Eric Allen for an interception on the Philadelphia 38-yard line. From there, the Eagles drove to a 40-yard Roger Ruzek field goal that cut their deficit to 20–10 going into the fourth quarter.

The Saints' final six drives of the second half resulted in an interception, a punt, another interception, a safety, another interception, and time expiring in the game. Their possession after Ruzek's field goal ended when Hebert underthrew the ball on a pass attempt to a wide open Eric Martin on 3rd and 1. Then Cunningham closed the gap to 20–17 with a 35-yard touchdown completion to Barnett with less than 11 minutes left in regulation. Then on the first play of the Saints' next possession, Eagles linebacker Seth Joyner intercepted a pass from Hebert and returned it 14 yards to the Saints 26 to set up running back Heath Sherman's 6-yard touchdown run, giving Philadelphia the lead, 24–20. After New Orleans got the ball back, Eagles defensive end Reggie White sacked Hebert in the end zone for a safety. After the free kick, Ruzek added a 39-yard field goal. 19 seconds later, Allen intercepted Hebert and returned the ball 18 yards for a touchdown.

"I thought I had the first down and got a bad spot," said Dunbar of the play where he was ruled short on 3rd and 1. "It seemed kind of meaningless at the time, because we got the field goal. Now, in hindsight, it could have been that final nail in the Eagles' coffin."

Cunningham completed 19 of 35 passes for 219 yards and two touchdowns, while also rushing for 19 yards. Sherman rushed for a 105 yards and a touchdown, while also catching two passes for 17 yards. Barnett had four receptions for 102 yards and two scores. Allen had two interceptions. Dunbar had 115 all-purpose yards. This was Philadelphia's first playoff win since the 1980 season, ending a five-game losing streak which began in the Louisiana Superdome with Super Bowl XV.

This was the first postseason meeting between the Eagles and Saints.

== Divisional round ==
=== Saturday, January 9, 1993 ===
==== AFC: Buffalo Bills 24, Pittsburgh Steelers 3 ====
Buffalo Bills vs. Pittsburgh Steelers – Game summary

Quarter	1	2	3	4	Total
Bills	0	7	7	10	24
Steelers	3	0	0	0	3

at Three Rivers Stadium, Pittsburgh, Pennsylvania

- Game time: 12:30 p.m. EST
- Game weather: 37 °F (3 °C), light rain
- Game attendance: 60,407
- Referee: Bernie Kukar
- TV announcers (NBC): Marv Albert (play-by-play) and Bill Parcells (color commentator)

Game information

First quarter

- PIT – Gary Anderson 38-yard field goal. Steelers 3–0.

Second quarter

- BUF – Mitch Frerotte 1-yard pass from Frank Reich (Steve Christie kick). Bills 7–3.

Third quarter

- BUF – James Lofton 17-yard pass from Frank Reich (Steve Christie kick). Bills 14–3.

Fourth quarter

- BUF – Steve Christie 43-yard field goal. Bills 17–3.
- BUF – Carwell Gardner 1-yard run (Steve Christie kick). Bills 24–3.

Top passers

- BUF – Frank Reich – 16/23, 160 yards, 2 TD
- PIT – Neil O'Donnell – 15/29, 163 yards, 2 INT

Top rushers

- BUF – Kenneth Davis – 10 rushes, 104 yards
- PIT – Barry Foster – 20 rushes, 104 yards

Top receivers

- BUF – Don Beebe – 6 receptions, 72 yards
- PIT – Ernie Mills – 8 receptions, 93 yards

The Bills forced four fumbles, three turnovers, and seven sacks as they held the Steelers to just a field goal. Buffalo quarterback Frank Reich threw for 160 yards, two touchdowns, and no interceptions; while running back Kenneth Davis rushed for 104 yards. Steelers running back Barry Foster rushed for 104 yards and caught a pass for seven yards. Pittsburgh had led the NFL with 43 takeaways during the season, but they were not able to force any in this game.

On the opening drive of the game, the Bills drove to the Pittsburgh 46-yard line. But on fourth and 1, fullback Carwell Gardner was stuffed by linebackers David Little and Hardy Nickerson for no gain. The turnover on downs led to Gary Anderson's 38-yard field goal to give Pittsburgh a 3–0 lead. However, Steelers quarterback Neil O'Donnell, who had missed the last three games of the season with a leg injury, ended up turning the ball over three times on the team's next four drives. First he threw a pass that was deflected by Phil Hansen into the arms of Nate Odomes for an interception. Following a punt from each team, Bruce Smith forced a fumble from O'Donnell, which Hansen recovered on the Bills 41-yard line. Buffalo then advanced 59 yards, including a 19-yard catch by receiver Don Beebe on the Steelers 1-yard line. On the next play, the team scored on Reich's 1-yard touchdown pass to Mitch Frerotte, an eligible offensive lineman playing out of the fullback position. Although there would be no more scoring in the first half, Pittsburgh's struggles would continue. On their next drive, O'Donnell was intercepted by James Williams.

On the opening drive of the second half, the Bills moved the ball 80 yards and scored with Reich's 17-yard touchdown pass to James Lofton, increasing their lead to 14–3. On the play before the touchdown, Reich had thrown the ball right into the hands of defensive back Richard Shelton while trying to connect with Beebe, but Shelton dropped the pass, costing his team what would have been an easy touchdown return. "I was just running before I caught the ball, and that really hurt", Shelton said after the game. "I could have had six."

In the final quarter, a botched Steelers field goal attempt set up a 44-yard drive that ended with Bills kicker Steve Christie's 43-yard field goal. The next time Buffalo got the ball, they drove 86 yards and scored on a 1-yard run from Gardner.

This was the second postseason meeting between the Bills and Steelers. Pittsburgh won the only previous meeting.

Previous playoff games
Pittsburgh leads 1–0 in all-time playoff games

1974

Buffalo Bills 14 @ Pittsburgh Steelers 32

1974 AFC Divisional playoffs

==== NFC: San Francisco 49ers 20, Washington Redskins 13 ====
Washington Redskins vs. San Francisco 49ers – Game summary

Quarter	1	2	3	4	Total
Redskins	3	0	3	7	13
49ers	7	10	0	3	20

at Candlestick Park, San Francisco, California

- Game time: 4:00 p.m. EST/1:00 p.m. PST
- Game weather: 55 °F (13 °C), partly cloudy
- Game attendance: 64,991
- Referee: Red Cashion
- TV announcers (CBS): Pat Summerall (play-by-play) and John Madden (color commentator)

Game information

First quarter

- SF – John Taylor 5-yard pass from Steve Young (Mike Cofer kick). 49ers 7–0.
- WAS – Chip Lohmiller 19-yard field goal. 49ers 7–3.

Second quarter

- SF – Mike Cofer 23-yard field goal. 49ers 10–3.
- SF – Brent Jones 16-yard pass from Steve Young (Mike Cofer kick). 49ers 17–3.

Third quarter

- WAS – Chip Lohmiller 32-yard field goal. 49ers 17–6.

Fourth quarter

- WAS – Mark Rypien 1-yard run (Chip Lohmiller kick). 49ers 17–13.
- SF – Mike Cofer 33-yard field goal. 49ers 20–13.

Top passers

- WAS – Mark Rypien – 19/40, 270 yards, 2 INT
- SF – Steve Young – 20/30, 227 yards, 2 TD, INT

Top rushers

- WAS – Brian Mitchell – 7 rushes, 38 yards
- SF – Ricky Watters – 18 rushes, 83 yards

Top receivers

- WAS – Gary Clark – 7 receptions, 100 yards
- SF – Jerry Rice – 6 receptions, 88 yards

Despite committing four turnovers, 49ers quarterback Steve Young passed for 227 yards and two touchdowns, and ran for 73 yards, to beat the Redskins.

On their first drive, San Francisco advanced 83 yards, including a 35-yard reception by Jerry Rice and a 22-yard catch by tight end Brent Jones, to score on Young's 5-yard touchdown pass to wide receiver John Taylor that went off the hands of Redskins safety A. J. Johnson. The 49ers seemed to be in prime position to score again when Kelly Goodburn's 29-yard punt gave them a first down on the Washington 49, but Fred Stokes eventually stripped the ball from Young and safety Brad Edwards recovered the fumble. Washington then drove 61 yards to cut the score to 7–3 on a 19-yard field goal by Chip Lohmiller.

San Francisco responded with a 23-yard field goal from Mike Cofer to go up 10–3 in the second quarter. Then after forcing a punt, they moved the ball from their own 1-yard line to the Redskins 29, but lost another turnover when Johnson intercepted Young's pass at the 5. However, Washington promptly gave the ball back when running back Brian Mitchell lost a fumble that was recovered by David Whitmore with 1:09 left in the half. Four plays later, Young threw a 16-yard touchdown pass to Jones, who fumbled the ball when hit by Edwards at the 1, but managed to recover it in the end zone to give San Francisco a 17–3 halftime lead.

In the second half, Washington converted two Young fumbles into 10 points. The 49ers got a great scoring opportunity after Whitmore intercepted a pass from Mark Rypien in the third quarter. But while scrambling for a first down, Young lost a fumble without being touched and linebacker Monte Coleman recovered it. This led to a 71-yard drive finished off by Lohmiller's 32-yard field goal, cutting Washington's deficit to 17–6. On the next series, the ball again slipped out of Young's hands, this time on a pass attempt, and Redskins defensive lineman Charles Mann recovered it on the San Francisco 15-yard line. Three plays later, Rypien scored on a 1-yard sneak, cutting the deficit to 17–13 early in the fourth quarter.

Following a 49ers punt, Washington moved the ball 52 yards to the 49ers 23-yard line. But with 9:52 left, Mitchell fumbled a botched handoff attempt by Rypien and linebacker Michael Walter recovered the fumble. San Francisco then marched 59 yards in 14 plays, featuring a 16-yard completion from Young to Rice on third and 10, on a drive that consumed more than seven minutes off the clock and scored on Cofer's 33-yard field goal, making the score 20–13. Washington got the ball back with 2:15 remaining and had one last chance to drive for a tying score, but they could only advance a few yards before turning the ball over on downs, as Rypien's final two passes were dropped by wide open targets, receiver Ricky Sanders and tight end Ron Middleton.

49ers running back Ricky Watters was the game's top rusher with 83 yards, while also catching two passes for 19. Defensive end Pierce Holt had three of San Francisco's five sacks. Redskins receiver Gary Clark caught seven passes for 100 yards. This was the last game of Joe Gibbs' first tenure as Redskins head coach. Washington would not return to the playoffs again until 1999.

This was the fourth postseason meeting between the Redskins and 49ers. San Francisco won two of the previous three meetings.

Previous playoff games
San Francisco leads 2–1 in all-time playoff games

1971

Washington Redskins 20 @ San Francisco 49ers 24

1971 NFC Divisional playoffs

1983

San Francisco 49ers 21 @ Washington Redskins 24

1983 NFC Championship Game

1990

Washington Redskins 10 @ San Francisco 49ers 28

1990 NFC Divisional playoffs

=== Sunday, January 10, 1993 ===
==== NFC: Dallas Cowboys 34, Philadelphia Eagles 10 ====
Philadelphia Eagles vs. Dallas Cowboys – Game summary

Quarter	1	2	3	4	Total
Eagles	3	0	0	7	10
Cowboys	7	10	10	7	34

at Texas Stadium, Irving, Texas

- Game time: 12:30 p.m. EST/11:30 a.m. CST
- Game weather: 57 °F (14 °C), partly cloudy
- Game attendance: 63,721
- Referee: Tom White
- TV announcers (CBS): Verne Lundquist (play-by-play) and Dan Fouts (color commentator)

Game information

First quarter

- PHI – Roger Ruzek 32-yard field goal. Eagles 3–0.
- DAL – Derek Tennell 1-yard pass from Troy Aikman (Lin Elliott kick). Cowboys 7–3.

Second quarter

- DAL – Jay Novacek 6-yard pass from Troy Aikman (Lin Elliott kick). Cowboys 14–3.
- DAL – Lin Elliott 20-yard field goal. Cowboys 17–3.

Third quarter

- DAL – Emmitt Smith 23-yard run (Lin Elliott kick). Cowboys 24–3.
- DAL – Lin Elliott 43-yard field goal. Cowboys 27–3.

Fourth quarter

- DAL – Derrick Gainer 1-yard run (Lin Elliott kick). Cowboys 34–3.
- PHI – Calvin Williams 18-yard pass from Randall Cunningham (Roger Ruzek kick). Cowboys 34–10.

Top passers

- PHI – Randall Cunningham – 17/30, 160 yards, TD
- DAL – Troy Aikman – 15/25, 200 yards, 2 TD

Top rushers

- PHI – Herschel Walker – 6 rushes, 29 yards
- DAL – Emmitt Smith – 25 rushes, 114 yards, TD

Top receivers

- PHI – Calvin Williams – 4 receptions, 48 yards
- DAL – Michael Irvin – 6 receptions, 88 yards

The Cowboys defense had five sacks (two each by linemen Russell Maryland and Tony Tolbert), and held the Eagles offense to 178 yards and 10 points.

Philadelphia scored on the opening drive of the game, holding the ball for seven minutes on the way to a 32-yard field goal by kicker Roger Ruzek, but then Dallas scored 34 consecutive points. Kelvin Martin returned the ensuing kickoff 39 yards to the Eagles 46, sparking a 10-play drive that ended on Troy Aikman's 1-yard touchdown pass to tight end Derek Tennell, who had been signed by the team as a free agent only a week before this game. After the next three drives from each team ended in punts, Aikman completed a 41-yard pass to Alvin Harper on the Philadelphia 14-yard line with 1:04 left in the half. Following an 8-yard scramble by Aikman, he finished the 67-yard drive with a 6-yard touchdown pass to tight end Jay Novacek. Then Darren Woodson forced a fumble from Vai Sikahema on the following kickoff, which Thomas Everett recovered for Dallas on the Eagles 29. This enabled Lin Elliott to kick a 20-yard field goal before halftime that put them up 17–3.

In the third quarter, Dallas held the ball for more than 12 minutes and gained 176 yards, while holding the Eagles to -16. Cowboys running back Emmitt Smith, who finished the game with 114 rushing yards, scored a 23-yard touchdown run on the opening drive of the second half. Elliott later kicked a 43-yard field goal to put the team up 27–3.

Late in the fourth quarter, Smith was taken out of the game and got to watch Derrick Gainer carry the ball nine times for 29 yards on an 11-play, 80-yard drive that ended on Gainer's 1-yard touchdown run. Meanwhile, all the Eagles could do was score a meaningless touchdown on Randall Cunningham's 18-yard pass to Calvin Williams with 50 seconds left in the game.

Aikman completed 15/25 passes for 200 yards and two touchdowns. Cunningham finished the game 17/30 for 160 yards and one touchdown, along with 25 rushing yards.

"There was a lot of talking before this game", said Cowboys linebacker Ken Norton Jr. "We did our talking on the field. I don't think they have too much they can say right now."

This was the second postseason meeting between the Eagles and Cowboys. Philadelphia won the only prior meeting.

Previous playoff games
Philadelphia leads 1–0 in all-time playoff games

1980

Dallas Cowboys 7 @ Philadelphia Eagles 20

1980 NFC Championship Game

==== AFC: Miami Dolphins 31, San Diego Chargers 0 ====
San Diego Chargers vs. Miami Dolphins – Game summary

Quarter	1	2	3	4	Total
Chargers	0	0	0	0	0
Dolphins	0	21	0	10	31

at Joe Robbie Stadium, Miami, Florida

- Game time: 4:00 p.m. EST
- Game weather: 84 °F (29 °C), rain
- Game attendance: 71,224
- Referee: Johnny Grier
- TV announcers (NBC): Dick Enberg (play-by-play) and Bob Trumpy (color commentator)

Game information

First quarter

- No scoring plays.

Second quarter

- MIA – Tony Paige 1-yard pass from Dan Marino (Pete Stoyanovich kick). Dolphins 7–0.
- MIA – Keith Jackson 9-yard pass from Dan Marino (Pete Stoyanovich kick). Dolphins 14–0.
- MIA – Keith Jackson 30-yard pass from Dan Marino (Pete Stoyanovich kick). Dolphins 21–0.

Third quarter

- No scoring plays.

Fourth quarter

- MIA – Pete Stoyanovich 22-yard field goal. Dolphins 24–0.
- MIA – Aaron Craver 25-yard run (Pete Stoyanovich kick). Dolphins 31–0.

Top passers

- SD – Stan Humphries – 18/44, 140 yards, 4 INT
- MIA – Dan Marino – 17/29, 167 yards, 3 TD

Top rushers

- SD – Eric Bieniemy – 4 rushes, 26 yards
- MIA – Aaron Craver – 8 rushes, 72 yards, TD

Top receivers

- SD – Ronnie Harmon – 9 receptions, 73 yards
- MIA – Mark Duper – 3 receptions, 57 yards

The Dolphins defense shut out the Chargers, holding San Diego quarterback Stan Humphries to just 18 of 44 completions for 140 yards and intercepting him four times as they snuffed out San Diego's eight-game winning streak. Overall, San Diego gained just 202 yards and 10 first downs, while losing five turnovers. The Chargers had seven sacks in their wild card win against Kansas City, but none in this game.

Dolphins quarterback Dan Marino threw three touchdown passes in the second quarter, all of them set up by interceptions. With 11:30 remaining in the second quarter, rookie Troy Vincent intercepted a pass from Humphries and returned it two yards to the San Diego 48. Nine plays later, Miami cashed in with Marino's 1-yard touchdown pass to Tony Paige. With less than two minutes left in the half, Humphries threw a pass that slipped out of the hands of receiver Nate Lewis and was picked off by Vincent on the Chargers 37. Marino threw a 28-yard completion to Mark Duper on the next play, and finished the drive with a 9-yard touchdown toss to tight end Keith Jackson. Then on the fourth play after the ensuing kickoff, linebacker Bryan Cox intercepted a pass intended for Shawn Jefferson and returned it seven yards to the San Diego 42. Four plays later, Marino's 30-yard touchdown pass to Jackson gave Miami a 21–0 halftime lead.

In the second half, Miami relied primarily on their running game to protect their lead. Running back Aaron Craver led the team with eight carries for 72 yards, including a 25-yard touchdown burst in the fourth quarter. Before that, the Dolphins also scored on a 22-yard field goal from kicker Pete Stoyanovich. The final score of 31–0 marked a record setting day for the Dolphins offense, who had scored just six touchdowns in the last six games. Their 21 points was the highest single quarter amount they had ever scored in a playoff game, and their 31-point margin of victory was also a franchise postseason record. The win was the first in a Divisional Round for Miami since 1986.

Marino finished the game with 167 passing yards and three touchdowns. Running back Bobby Humphrey rushed for 71 yards and caught three passes for 30. Miami also got a big performance out of punter Reggie Roby, who planted four of his eight punts inside the Chargers 20-yard line, including three that were inside the 7. Lewis gained 130 all-purpose yards, including four kickoff returns for 111. San Diego linebacker Junior Seau had 18 tackles.

This was the third postseason meeting between the Chargers and Dolphins. Both teams split the previous two meetings.

Previous playoff games
Tied 1–1 in all-time playoff games

1981

San Diego Chargers 41 @ Miami Dolphins 38 (OT)

1981 AFC Divisional playoffs

1982

San Diego Chargers 13 @ Miami Dolphins 34

1982 AFC second round playoffs

== Conference championships ==
=== Sunday, January 17, 1993 ===
==== AFC: Buffalo Bills 29, Miami Dolphins 10 ====
Buffalo Bills vs. Miami Dolphins – Game summary

Quarter	1	2	3	4	Total
Bills	3	10	10	6	29
Dolphins	3	0	0	7	10

at Joe Robbie Stadium, Miami, Florida

- Game time: 12:30 p.m. EST
- Game weather: 75 °F (24 °C), clear
- Game attendance: 72,703
- Referee: Bob McElwee
- TV announcers (NBC): Dick Enberg (play-by-play) and Bob Trumpy (color commentator)

Game information

First quarter

- BUF – Steve Christie 21-yard field goal. Bills 3–0.
- MIA – Pete Stoyanovich 51-yard field goal. Tied 3–3.

Second quarter

- BUF – Thurman Thomas 17-yard pass from Jim Kelly (Steve Christie kick). Bills 10–3.
- BUF – Steve Christie 33-yard field goal. Bills 13–3.

Third quarter

- BUF – Kenneth Davis 2-yard run (Steve Christie kick). Bills 20–3.
- BUF – Steve Christie 21-yard field goal. Bills 23–3.

Fourth quarter

- BUF – Steve Christie 31-yard field goal. Bills 26–3.
- MIA – Mark Duper 15-yard pass from Dan Marino (Pete Stoyanovich kick). Bills 26–10.
- BUF – Steve Christie 38-yard field goal. Bills 29–10.

Top passers

- BUF – Jim Kelly – 17/24, 177 yards, TD, 2 INT
- MIA – Dan Marino – 22/45, 268 yards, TD, 2 INT

Top rushers

- BUF – Thurman Thomas – 20 rushes, 96 yards
- MIA – Bobby Humphrey – 8 rushes, 22 yards

Top receivers

- BUF – Thurman Thomas – 5 receptions, 70 yards, TD
- MIA – Keith Jackson – 5 receptions, 71 yards

The Bills intercepted Dolphins quarterback Dan Marino twice, recovered three fumbles, forced four sacks, and held Miami to just 33 rushing yards. Jim Kelly returned to quarterback the Bills after an injury kept him out of the first two postseason games, and Buffalo had a rusty time getting offensive scores. However, kicker Steve Christie made an NFL playoff record-tying five field goals while key players stepped up on both sides as the Bills rushed their way into history. Thurman Thomas, who had been knocked out of the game in both of the Bills prior two playoff contests, rushed for 96 yards and caught five passes for 70, while Kenneth Davis added 61 rushing yards and four receptions for 52.

Midway through the first quarter, Bills defensive end Bruce Smith forced a fumble from Marino while sacking him, and linebacker Darryl Talley recovered it, setting up a 21-yard field goal by Christie. Miami struck back on their next drive with a 51-yard field goal from Pete Stoyanovich. After the ensuing kickoff, Kelly led the Bills 64 yards in seven plays and finished the drive with a 17-yard touchdown pass to Thomas early in the second quarter. Later on, Buffalo defensive end Phil Hansen intercepted a pass from Marino on the Dolphins 24-yard line, setting up Christie's second field goal and giving the Bills a 13–3 lead by the end of the first half.

On the opening kickoff of the second half, Miami returner Mike Williams fumbled the ball while being tackled by Mark Pike, and Buffalo's Carwell Gardner recovered it at the Dolphins 25-yard line. Five plays later, Davis scored on a 2-yard touchdown run, giving the Bills a 20–3 lead. Buffalo's defense took over the rest of the third quarter, holding the Dolphins offense to two offensive yards while Christie added two more field goals to increase their lead to 26–3. Marino completed a 15-yard touchdown pass to wide receiver Mark Duper in the final quarter. However, Christie kicked his fifth field goal of the game to clinch the victory.

This was the second straight year the Bills defeated a future Hall of Fame quarterback to advance to the Super Bowl as they beat John Elway and his Denver Broncos 10–7 a season earlier. The Bills became the first team in 19 years to reach the Super Bowl in three straight seasons (the last being the 1971-1973 Miami Dolphins); no other team would win three straight Conference Championships until the 2016-2018 New England Patriots. This was the last time the Bills won a postseason game on the road until the 2025–26 playoffs, as they lost seven subsequent postseason games as the road team. It is also the last time as of today that the Dolphins have played in an AFC Championship Game.

This was the second postseason meeting between the Bills and Dolphins. Buffalo won the only previous meeting.

Previous playoff games
Buffalo leads 1–0 in all-time playoff games

1990

Miami Dolphins 34 @ Buffalo Bills 44

1990 AFC Divisional playoffs

==== NFC: Dallas Cowboys 30, San Francisco 49ers 20 ====
Dallas Cowboys vs. San Francisco 49ers – Game summary

Quarter	1	2	3	4	Total
Cowboys	3	7	7	13	30
49ers	7	3	3	7	20

at Candlestick Park, San Francisco, California

- Game time: 4:00 p.m. EST/1:00 p.m. PST
- Game weather: 54 °F (12 °C), partly cloudy, occasional rain
- Game attendance: 64,920
- Referee: Jerry Markbreit
- TV announcers (CBS): Pat Summerall (play-by-play) and John Madden (color commentator)

Game information

First quarter

- DAL – Lin Elliott 20-yard field goal. Cowboys 3–0.
- SF – Steve Young 1-yard run (Mike Cofer kick). 49ers 7–3.

Second quarter

- DAL – Emmitt Smith 4-yard run (Lin Elliott kick). Cowboys 10–7.
- SF – Mike Cofer 28-yard field goal. Tied 10–10.

Third quarter

- DAL – Daryl Johnston 3-yard run (Lin Elliott kick). Cowboys 17–10.
- SF – Mike Cofer 42-yard field goal. Cowboys 17–13.

Fourth quarter

- DAL – Emmitt Smith 16-yard pass from Troy Aikman (Lin Elliott kick). Cowboys 24–13.
- SF – Jerry Rice 5-yard pass from Steve Young (Mike Cofer kick). Cowboys 24–20.
- DAL – Kelvin Martin 6-yard pass from Troy Aikman (kick blocked). Cowboys 30–20.

Top passers

- DAL – Troy Aikman – 24/34, 322 yards, 2 TD
- SF – Steve Young – 25/35, 313 yards, TD, 2 INT

Top rushers

- DAL – Emmitt Smith – 24 rushes, 114 yards, TD
- SF – Ricky Watters – 11 rushes, 69 yards

Top receivers

- DAL – Alvin Harper – 3 receptions, 117 yards
- SF – Jerry Rice – 8 receptions, 123 yards, TD

Even though the Cowboys had only one more yard of total offense than the 49ers (416–415), Dallas forced four critical turnovers that helped them earn the win. On San Francisco's first drive of the game, a controversial holding penalty on guard Guy McIntyre nullified a 63-yard touchdown completion from quarterback Steve Young to wide receiver Jerry Rice, and the 49ers had to punt. Despite a 19-yard reception from Michael Irvin on the Cowboys first play, they also had to punt, but returner Alan Grant fumbled after a hit from Dixon Edwards and Dallas fullback Daryl Johnston recovered on the 49ers 22. The Cowboys restarted their drive with a completion to Irvin, this one a 21-yard gain to the 1-yard line. But the San Francisco defense managed to hold them up on three consecutive plays, forcing Dallas to settle for Lin Elliott's 20-yard field goal.

San Francisco running back Marc Logan returned the ensuing kickoff 50 yards to the Cowboys 48-yard line. Aided by a 16-yard run from Ricky Watters, San Francisco drove 48 yards and scored with Young's 1-yard touchdown run to take a 7–3 lead. Dallas was forced to punt on their next drive after Troy Aikman was sacked twice (one by Bill Romanowski and the other by Martin Harrison) for 19 total yards, and Grant returned the football to the Cowboys 47-yard line. San Francisco then drove to the Dallas 29-yard line, but the drive stalled there and Mike Cofer missed a 47-yard field goal try. After a punt, Watters lost a fumble that was recovered by defensive back Kevin Smith. Aided by a defensive holding call against Pierce Holt for holding up running back Emmitt Smith at the line on third down (the 49ers objected, stating that Holt was fooled by a fake handoff into thinking Smith actually had the ball), Dallas took a 10–7 lead with Smith's 4-yard touchdown run. A 21-yard reception by Rice sparked a 49ers drive to the Cowboys 10-yard line where Cofer made a 28-yard field goal to tie the game with less than two minutes left in the second quarter. Cofer's kickoff went out of bounds, giving Dallas a chance to score before the end of the half. Aikman managed to lead them to the 49ers 25-yard line, but Elliott's 43-yard field goal attempt went wide right and it was tied at 10 going into halftime.

After receiving the second half kickoff, the Cowboys marched 78 yards, featuring a 38-yard leaping catch by Alvin Harper over Eric Davis, to score on Johnston's 3-yard touchdown run to take a 17–10 lead.

The 49ers struck back with a 35-yard completion from Young to Rice that set up a 43-yard field goal by Cofer, cutting the score to 17–13. However, Dallas put together a 79-yard drive which consumed nine minutes with a key 31-yard reception by tight end Jay Novacek. This second long drive was capped by Aikman's 16-yard touchdown pass to Smith, giving the Cowboys a 24–13 advantage.

On the ensuing drive for San Francisco midway into the fourth, Cowboys linebacker Ken Norton Jr. intercepted a pass from Young and returned it to the 49ers 45-yard line, and Dallas subsequently marched to the 7. Rather than attempt a field goal on fourth down and 1, Smith attempted to run for the first down, but was tackled by linebacker Michael Walter for no gain. The 49ers then drove 93 yards to score on Rice's 5-yard touchdown reception, cutting the lead to 24–20 with 4:22 left in the game. But on the first play after the ensuing kickoff, Aikman threw a 14-yard pass to Harper, who ended up running for a 70-yard gain to the San Francisco 9-yard line. Three plays later, wide receiver Kelvin Martin scored on a 6-yard touchdown reception, making it 30–20 (the extra point was blocked) with 3:43 to play. The 49ers attempted one last drive to come back, but Young was intercepted, this time by free safety James Washington at the 2:00 warning, thus ending any hope of a 49er comeback.

Aikman threw for 322 yards and two touchdowns with no interceptions. Smith rushed for 24 carries and 114 yards, caught seven passes for 59 yards, and scored two touchdowns. Harper caught three passes for 117 yards. Defensive tackle Tony Casillas recorded three sacks. Meanwhile, Young recorded 313 passing yards and one touchdown, but threw two interceptions in the fourth quarter. Rice caught eight passes for 123 yards and a score. Watters rushed for 69 yards and caught six passes for 69. In the Cowboys post-game locker room speech cameras caught coach Jimmy Johnson saying "How 'bout them Cowboys!" which has become a popular expression. This game stood as the last road playoff win for the Cowboys until 30 years later in the 2022-23 playoffs.

This was later featured on NFL's Greatest Games as Changing of the Guard.

This was the fifth postseason meeting between the Cowboys and 49ers. Dallas won three of the four meetings.

Previous playoff games
Dallas leads 3–1 in all-time playoff games

1970

Dallas Cowboys 17 @ San Francisco 49ers 10

1970 NFC Championship Game

1971

San Francisco 49ers 3 @ Dallas Cowboys 14

1971 NFC Championship Game

1972

Dallas Cowboys 30 @ San Francisco 49ers 28

1972 NFC Divisional playoffs

1981

Dallas Cowboys 27 @ San Francisco 49ers 28

1981 NFC Championship Game

== Super Bowl XXVII: Dallas Cowboys 52, Buffalo Bills 17 ==
Super Bowl XXVII – Buffalo Bills vs. Dallas Cowboys – Game summary

Quarter	1	2	3	4	Total
Bills (AFC)	7	3	7	0	17
Cowboys (NFC)	14	14	3	21	52

at Rose Bowl, Pasadena, California

- Date: January 31, 1993
- Game attendance: 98,374
- Referee: Dick Hantak
- TV announcers (NBC): Dick Enberg (play-by-play) and Bob Trumpy (color commentator)

This was the first Super Bowl meeting between the Bills and Cowboys.

== Bibliography ==
- Total Football: The Official Encyclopedia of the National Football League (ISBN 0-06-270174-6)
- The Sporting News Complete Super Bowl Book 1995 (ISBN 0-89204-523-X)
