= Edgewood Lake =

Edgewood Lake may refer to:

== Lakes ==
- Edgewood Lake (Alabama)
- Edgewood Lake (Rhode Island)
