= Edgewood Plantation =

Edgewood Plantation may refer to:

- Edgewood Plantation (Leon County, Florida)
- Edgewood (Farmerville, Louisiana), also known as Edgewood Plantation, listed on the National Register of Historic Places (NRHP) in Union Parish
- Edgewood (Natchez, Mississippi), also known as Edgewood Plantation, NRHP-listed in Adams County
- Edgewood Plantation and Harrison's Mill, Charles City County, Virginia, NRHP-listed

== See also ==
- Edgewood (disambiguation)
