= Macena =

Macena is a surname. Notable people with the surname include:

- Felipe Macena (born 1993), Brazilian footballer
- Gilberto Macena (born 1984), Brazilian footballer
- Raphael Macena (born 1989), Brazilian footballer

== See also ==
- Maceda (surname)
