= Maceda =

Maceda may refer to:

- Maceda (surname)
- Maceda, Ourense, a municipality in Ourense, Galicia, Spain
- Maceda, Portugal, a parish in Ovar
- Maceda (moth), a genus of moths
