= Edgewood High School (West Covina, California) =

Location
- 34.0613°N 117.9489°W; 1301 Trojan Way; West Covina, California; United States

Information
- Type: Public Secondary
- Motto: The pride of West Covina
- Established: 1958-1988, 2010-
- School district: West Covina Unified School District
- Category: Public
- Principal: Kimberly Cabrera
- Teaching staff: 36.64 (FTE)
- Grades: 09-12
- Enrollment: 832 (2018-19)
- Student to teacher ratio: 22.71
- Colors: Blue and gold
- Athletics conference: CIF Southern Section; Miramonte League
- Mascot: Lions
- Yearbook: Shades of Blue
- Website: Edgewood High School

Edgewood High School is a secondary school located in West Covina, California and is serviced by West Covina Unified School District. Founded as a high school in 1958, it operated until 1988 and was later re-opened in 2010. The newly started high school's first graduating class was the class of 2014, which was the only class on campus when the school first opened in 2010. The school is part of the Freelance League.

== History ==
Edgewood High School was originally established in 1958 by the Covina Union High School District after they bought land from the Hurst Family Ranch. The purpose of the school was to ease the problems of overcrowding at West Covina High School's old campus. Its athletic teams were known as the Trojans.

It was announced that due to budget deficits, Edgewood High School would be closed after the 1987–88 academic year, leaving West Covina High School as the only high school in the entire district. The district initially planned to sell the campus and consolidate the grades 7 to 8 programs from three other elementary and intermediate schools all at one campus, generating much controversy among parents and stakeholders. Eventually the district decided to keep the Edgewood campus and open Edgewood Middle School. With West Covina High facing overcrowding problems, the district decided to re-open Edgewood High School on the middle school site. In 2010 the high school re-opened as an International Baccalaureate school.

== Demographics ==
The ethnicity of the school in 2021-2022 was:

Hispanic/Latino: 632
Asian: 156
White: 29
African American: 15
American Indian/Alaska Native: 2
Pacific Islander: 6
Two or more races: 3
Not reported: 12
Total: 855

== Notable alumni ==
- Rick Aguilera, baseball player for the New York Mets, Minnesota Twins, Boston Red Sox and Chicago Cubs
- Debbie Bartlett, dancer and actress, known for The Love Boat
- Jeff Cook, basketball player for the Phoenix Suns, San Antonio Spurs, Cleveland Cavaliers, and Utah Jazz.
- Jay Johnstone, baseball player for the California Angels, Chicago White Sox, Oakland Athletics, Philadelphia Phillies, New York Yankees, San Diego Padres, Los Angeles Dodgers and Chicago Cubs
- Jim Maceda, Class of 1966, is a journalist and foreign correspondent for NBC News based in London
- Jim Merritt, baseball player for the Minnesota Twins, Cincinnati Reds, Texas Rangers, World Series 1965 and 1970
- Mike Powell, track and field athlete, holder of the long jump world record
- Craig Puz, Class of 1972 was an astronaut selected in 1982 for the USAF Manned Spaceflight Engineer Program
- Gary Roenicke, Class of 1973 was a baseball player for the Montreal Expos, Baltimore Orioles and New York Yankees
- Ron Roenicke, Class of 1974 was an MLB player and coach, former Milwaukee Brewers manager

== Yearly API ==
Year	API Base Data	API Growth Data	Growth Target	Actual Growth
2010–2011	—	789	—	—
2011–2012	790	829	5	40
2012–2013	832	819	—	-10
