= Edgewood Historic District =

Edgewood Historic District may refer to:

in the United States

(by state)

- Edgewood Park Historic District, New Haven, CT, listed on the NRHP in Connecticut
- Edgewood Historic District-Taft Estate Plat, Cranston, RI, listed on the NRHP in Rhode Island
- Edgewood Historic District (Venice, Florida), listed on the NRHP in Florida
- Village of Edgewood Historic District, Edgewood, Pennsylvania, listed on the NRHP in Pennsylvania
- Edgewood Historic District (Charleston, West Virginia), listed on the NRHP in West Virginia
- Woodsdale-Edgewood Neighborhood Historic District, Wheeling, West Virginia, listed on the NRHP in West Virginia
- Edgewood Place Historic District, La Crosse, WI, listed on the NRHP in Wisconsin
- Edgewood College Mound Group Archeological District, Madison, WI, listed on the NRHP in Wisconsin
