= Edgewood station =

Edgewood station may refer to:

- Edgewood Railroad Station (New York), a former Ulster and Delaware Railroad station in Edgewood, New York
- Edgewood station (LIRR), a former flag stop on the Main Line of the Long Island Rail Road
- Edgewood station (MARC) a commuter railroad station in Edgewood, Maryland
- Edgewood / Candler Park station, a MARTA station in Atlanta, Georgia

== See also ==
- Edgewood (disambiguation)
