= Christian Yeung =

American actor and basketball player (born 1987)

Personal information
- Born: November 6, 1987 (age 39) West Covina, California
- Listed height: 6 ft 0 in (1.83 m)
- Listed weight: 165 lb (75 kg)

Career information
- High school: West Covina (West Covina, California)
- College: UC Riverside (2005–2006)
- Playing career: 2013–2014
- Position: Guard

Career history
- 2013–2014: Dorados de Chihuahua

Christian Yeung (born November 6, 1987) is an American actor and former basketball player from Los Angeles. As an NCAA Division I men's basketball player, he played for the UC Riverside Highlanders from 2005 to 2006. He also played for the Dorados de Chihuahua from 2013 to 2014. After his basketball career, he became an actor and has appeared in television series such as Westworld (2020).

== Early life and education ==
Christian Yeung was born in West Covina, California. His father is of Chinese descent, while his mother was born in Michoacán, Mexico.

He graduated from West Covina High School in 2005, and attended the University of California, Riverside from 2005 to 2009. At UC Riverside, Yeung studied theater and business administration.

== Career ==
As a basketball athlete, Yeung was often referred to by his fans as "The Dragon." He played for the UC Riverside Highlanders from 2005–2006. He also won first place in the Los Angeles Red Bull King of the Rock qualifier in 2010.

After graduating from UC Riverside, Yeung played for the Dorados de Chihuahua, as well as for a basketball team in Fujian, China.

After his basketball career, Yeung became an actor. He has appeared in various television series, including Westworld.

== Filmography ==
- Westworld (2020)
- The Walk (2020)
