= Edgewood Stakes =

- Class: Grade II
- Location: Churchill Downs, Louisville, Kentucky, USA
- Inaugurated: 1983
- Race type: Thoroughbred - Flat racing
- Sponsor: Accenture (since 2025)
- Website: Churchill Downs

Race information
- Distance: 1 1/16 miles
- Surface: Turf
- Track: Left-handed
- Qualification: Three-year-old fillies
- Weight: 123lbs with allowances
- Purse: $600,000 (2024)

The Edgewood Stakes is a Grade II American Thoroughbred horse race for three-year-old fillies run over a distance of 1 1/16 miles on turf held annually in early May on the Kentucky Oaks day meeting at Churchill Downs in Louisville, Kentucky during the spring meeting.

== History ==
The event is named after a neighborhood on the south side of Louisville known as Edgewood. The event was inaugurated on 9 July 1983 as run on the dirt track, was won by the favorite Migola, ridden by Iowa born jockey Garth Patterson by a margin of two lengths in a fast time of 1:44 2/5.

The event was not held in 1986 or 1990 and in 1991 the event was scheduled in June.

In 1998 the event was moved to the turf track. After years of instability with regards to the scheduling of the event, in 2002 Churchill Downs administration scheduled the event to be on the undercard of the Kentucky Oaks day meeting.

In 2015 the event was classified as Grade III.

From 2024 the winner of the race will receive a wildcard entry for the Epsom Oaks.

== Records ==
Speed record:

- 1 1/16 miles: 1:40.92 - Imaginationthelady (2026)
- 1 mile (turf): 1:35.35 - Forest Shadows (2003)
- 1 mile (dirt): 1:35.40 - Darien Miss (1988)

Margins

- 6 lengths - Weekend Delight (1985), Darien Miss (1988), Curtains Drawn (1991), Solar Bound (1999)

Most wins by a jockey:

- 4 - Larry Melancon (1984, 2000, 2001, 2003)

Most wins by a trainer:

- 7 - William I. Mott (1984, 1998, 1999, 2001, 2002, 2008, 2010)

Most wins by an owner:

- 2 - William S. Farish III (1985, 1996)
- 2 - Lewis G. Lakin (2001, 2010)
- 2 - Zayat Stable (2008, 2011)

== Winners ==
Year	Winner	Jockey	Trainer	Owner	Distance	Time	Purse	Grade	Ref
2026	Imaginationthelady	Tyler Gaffalione	Brendan P. Walsh	Mark Dobbin	1 1/16 miles	1:40.92	$589,500	II	
2025	Nitrogen	Jose L. Ortiz	Mark E. Casse	D. J. Stable	1 1/16 miles	1:41.58	$575,000	II	
2024	Dynamic Pricing (IRE)	Irad Ortiz Jr.	Chad C. Brown	Klaravich Stables	1 1/16 miles	1:44.10	$529,670	II	
2023	Heavenly Sunday	Florent Geroux	Brad H. Cox	Miacomet Farm	1 1/16 miles	1:42.40	$500,000	II	
2022	New Year's Eve	Luis Saez	Brendan P. Walsh	Marc Detampel	1 1/16 miles	1:43.39	$500,000	II	
2021	Gift List (GB)	Javier Castellano	Brian A. Lynch	Amerman Racing	1 1/16 miles	1:42.52	$300,000	II	
2020	Sharing	Manuel Franco	H. Graham Motion	Eclipse TB Partners & Gainesway Stable	1 mile	1:36.87	$300,000	II	
2019	Concrete Rose	Julien R. Leparoux	George R. Arnold II	Ashbrook Farm & BBN Racing	1 1/16 miles	1:43.34	$250,000	III	
2018	Toinette	Flavien Prat	Neil D. Drysdale	Ken Baca, Lisa & Nicholas Hawkins, Joseph & Lynne Hudson	1 1/16 miles	1:41.70	$200,000	III	
2017	La Coronel	Florent Geroux	Mark E. Casse	John C. Oxley	1 1/16 miles	1:45.56	$150,000	III	
2016	Catch a Glimpse	Florent Geroux	Mark E. Casse	Gary Barber, Michael James Ambler & Windways Farm	1 1/16 miles	1:42.92	$150,000	III	
2015	Feathered	Javier Castellano	Todd A. Pletcher	Eclipse Thoroughbred Partners	1 1/16 miles	1:42.05	$150,000	III	
2014	A Little Bit Sassy	Luis Saez	Michael R. Matz	Ramona Bass	1 1/16 miles	1:42.79	$171,750	Listed	
2013	Kitten's Dumplings	Joel Rosario	Michael J. Maker	Ken and Sarah Ramsey	1 1/16 miles	1:41.24	$173,400	Listed	
2012	Stephanie's Kitten	John R. Velazquez	Wayne M. Catalano	Ken and Sarah Ramsey	1 1/16 miles	1:40.94	$184,800	Listed	
2011	Diva Ash	Kent J. Desormeaux	Dale L. Romans	Zayat Stables	1 1/16 miles	1:45.93	$113,800	Listed	
2010	Dynazaper	Julien R. Leparoux	William I. Mott	Lewis G. Lakin	1 1/16 miles	1:43.26	$62,000		
2009	Laragh	Edgar S. Prado	John P. Terranova II	IEAH Stables, Gary Tolchin & Pegasus Holding Group Stables	1 1/16 miles	1:43.88	$115,300	Listed	
2008	Zee Zee	Kent J. Desormeaux	William I. Mott	Zayat Stables	1 1/16 miles	1:44.73	$168,600	Listed	
2007	Swingit	Brian Hernandez Jr.	Hal R. Wiggins	Robert V. Hovelson	1 1/16 miles	1:43.99	$171,150	Listed	
2006	Magnificent Song	Garrett K. Gomez	Todd A. Pletcher	L and D Farm	1 1/16 miles	1:42.15	$114,900	Listed	
2005	Sweet Talker	Brice Blanc	Kenneth G. McPeek	Eliah & Lisa Kahn	1 1/16 miles	1:41.94	$112,400	Listed	
2004	Galloping Gal	Edgar S. Prado	Kenneth G. McPeek	William A. Carl	1 1/16 miles	1:43.00	$116,700	Listed	
2003	Forest Shadows	Larry Melancon	Albert Stall Jr.	Phillips Racing Partnership	1 mile	1:35.35	$113,500	Listed	
2002	Maliziosa	Jerry D. Bailey	William I. Mott	Haras Santa Maria de Araras	1 mile	1:37.65	$115,800	Listed	
2001	La Vida Loca (IRE)	Larry Melancon	William I. Mott	Lewis G. Lakin	1 mile	1:37.75	$113,800	Listed	
2000	Ever After	Larry Melancon	Hal R. Wiggins	Pin Oak Stable	1 mile	1:37.05	$109,200	Listed	
1999	Solar Bound	Robby Albarado	William I. Mott	Guy B. & Diane Snowden	1 mile	1:36.42	$114,800	Listed	
1998	Adel	Francisco C. Torres	William I. Mott	Allen E. Paulson	1 mile	1:37.33	$114,700	Listed	
1997	Snowy Apparition	Donna Barton	D. Wayne Lukas	Gainesway Stable	1 mile	1:36.25	$106,021	Listed	
1996	Everhope	Craig Perret	George R. Arnold II	G. Watts Humphrey Jr., William S. Farish III & Pamela Firman	1 mile	1:35.54	$83,850	Listed	
1995	Country Cat	Donna M. Barton	D. Wayne Lukas	Overbrook Farm	1 mile	1:35.87	$80,700	Listed	
1994	Packet	Joe M. Johnson	Gary G. Hartlage	Upson Downs Farm & Patricia Lenihan	1 mile	1:36.51	$83,700	Listed	
1993	Dinners On Me	Brent E. Bartram	Terrence W. Dunlavy	Charles Randolph	1 mile	1:37.02	$53,650	Listed	
1992	Luv Me Luv Me Not	Fabio A. Arguello Jr.	Glenn S. Wismer	Philip S. Maas	1 mile	1:37.13	$55,600	Listed	
1991	Curtains Drawn	Ricardo D. Lopez	James E. Baker	Greentree Stable	1 mile	1:37.43	$57,250	Listed	
1990	Race not held								
1989	Born Famous	Earlie Fires	Reed M. Combest	Ann & Clinton Lagrosa	1 mile	1:37.40	$54,450		
1988	Darien Miss	Patrick A. Johnson	George R. Arnold II	Taylor Asbury	1 mile	1:35.40	$50,000		
1987	Lt. Lao	Patricia Cooksey	Betty L. Moran	Robert Keller	1 mile	1:36.80	$40,590		
1986	Race not held								
1985	Weekend Delight	James McKnight	Neil J. Howard	William S. Farish III	1 1/16 miles	1:44.00	$32,600		
1984	Mrs. Revere	Larry Melancon	William I. Mott	Dr. Hiram Polk & David Richardson	1 1/16 miles	1:45.60	$39,540		
1983	Migola	Garth Patterson	Raymond S. Lawrence Jr.	Leslie Combs II & Equites Stable	1 1/16 miles	1:44.40	$33,812		

Legend:
Dirt Turf

== See also ==
- List of American and Canadian Graded races
