= Edgewood High School =

Edgewood High School may refer to:

- Edgewood High School (West Covina, California), West Covina, California
- Edgewood Junior/Senior High School (Merritt Island, Florida)
- Edgewood High School (Indiana), Elettsville, Indiana
- Edgewood High School (Maryland), Edgewood, Maryland
- Edgewood High School (Ashtabula, Ohio)
- Edgewood Senior High School, Edgewood, Ohio
- Edgewood High School (Trenton, Ohio)
- Edgewood High School (Edgewood, Texas)
- Edgewood High School of the Sacred Heart, Madison, Wisconsin
- Edgewood Fine Arts Academy in San Antonio, Texas (formerly known as Edgewood High School)
- Edgewood Greater Boston Academy, Stoneham, Massachusetts
- Edgewood Regional High School, Atco, New Jersey

== See also ==
- Edgewood-Colesburg High School, Edgewood, Iowa
