= Shades Creek =

Creek near Birmingham, Alabama, US

Coordinates: 33°10′48″N 87°01′30″W

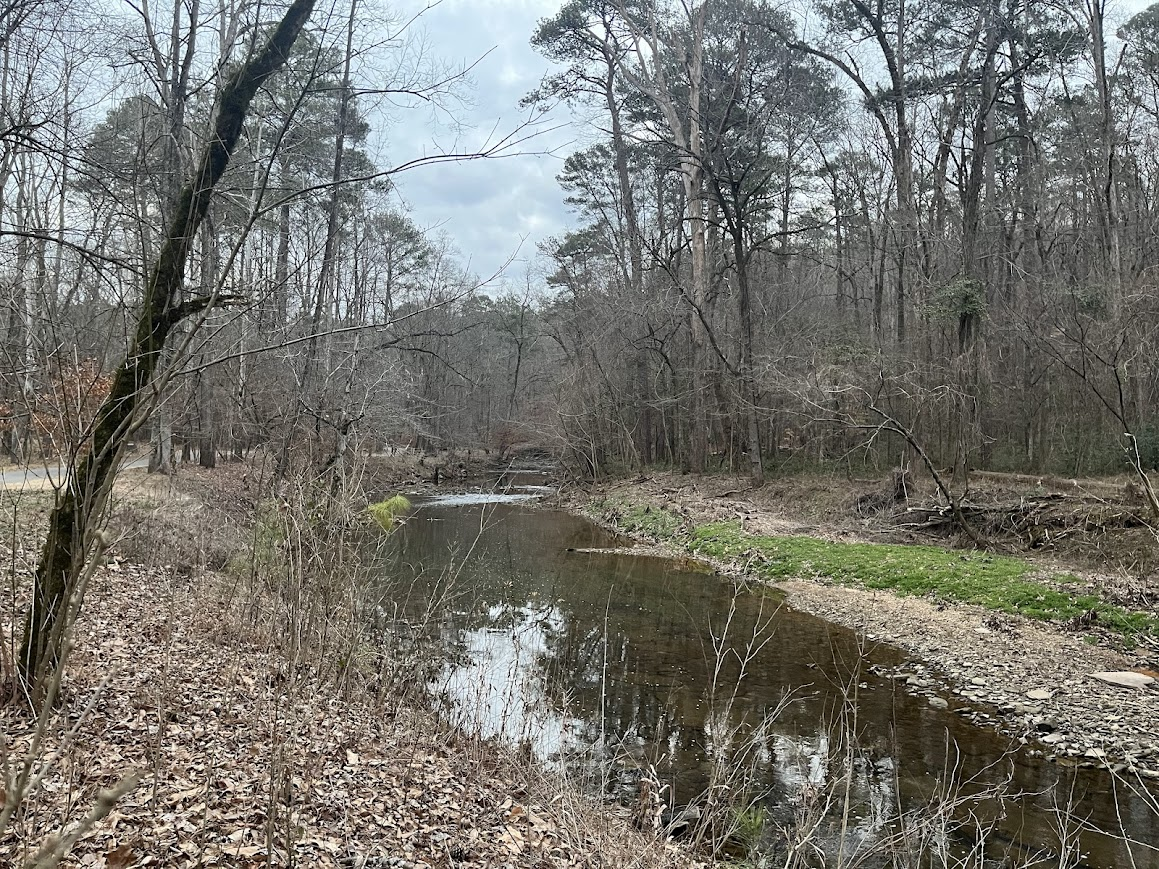
Shades Creek near Jemison Park in Birmingham, Alabama.

Shades Creek is a stream within central Alabama that flows through the cities of Birmingham, Irondale, Mountain Brook, Homewood, Hoover, and Bessemer. From its source at Sadler Gap in Red Mountain to its confluence with the Cahaba River, Shades Creek flows for a total of 55.8 miles.

== Geography ==
Shades Creek is sourced through three watersheds, Cooley Creek/Mud Creek, Upper Shades Creek, and Lower Shades Creek watersheds, encompassing an area of approximately 88,752 acres (139 square miles). This comprises 7.4% of the total watershed of the Cahaba River. Below is a list of the named tributaries and streams in all three watersheds

=== Cooley Creek-Mud Creek ===
- Mud Creek
- Cooley Creek
- Mill Creek

=== Lower Shades Creek ===
- Black Creek
- Clear Branch
- Bob George Branch
- Rice Creek
- Allen Brook
- Rocky Brook

=== Upper Shades Creek ===
- Shades Creek
- Griffin Branch
- Watkins Brook

== Ecology ==
Within the watershed areas of Shades Creek, the Alabama Department of Conservation and Natural Resources records species occurrence data for 23 amphibians, 188 birds, 15 crustaceans, 61 fish, 69 insects, 13 mammals, 30 mollusks, 18 reptiles, 7 spiders, and 241 vascular plants.

Given the suburban land use in some areas surrounding Shades Creek, there are several interactions between biota and nearby neighborhoods. For example, during late January, warmer rains encourage salamanders to leave their burrows and migrate to vernal pools near Shades Creek. Their trek frequently crosses Lakeshore Drive, where Homewood officially dedicated a 0.3-mile section as "Spotted Salamanders Crossing Zone" in 2003. The most common species identified during this migration include the spotted salamander and Webster's salamander.

== History ==
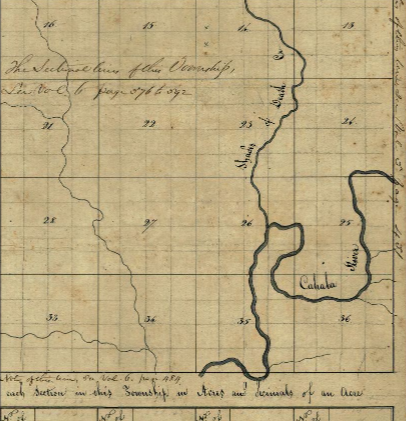
John Coffee's plat map, first known record of modern "Shades Creek", denoted as "Shades of Death Cr."

Historic sites within the Shades Creek area show evidence of continuous habitation from the Archaic period to the present. John Coffee, the Surveyor-general of northern Alabama territory, drew the first map of Shades Creek in 1820. Coffee originally used the name "Shades of Death Cr." While the origin is not entirely understood, it is likely due to the frequency of travelers becoming lost or attacked by animals within the region. The name was simplified to Shades Creek in the late 1850's following a population boom in the nearby areas.

In 1917 Shade's creek was dammed near Green Springs Highway to form an artificial lake known as Edgewood Lake. The dam eventually went into disrepair and the lake had to be drained in 1946 due to mosquito population concerns. Ownership of the former lakebed was transferred to Howard College in 1947. The school (now known as Samford University) had purchased land for a new campus on the hillside north of the creek and upper section of the lake the same year. Over the decades the university has sold portions of the land to the City of Homewood or private developers and erected athletic facilities on others. It provided a permanent easement for the construction of the Shades Creek Greenway.

Shades Creek is presently a popular destination for fishing, canoeing, swimming, and hiking. Plans to continue development of pre-existing trails, such as the Shades Creek Greenway in Homewood, are set for 2025.

== Preservation ==
As urban development has grown surrounding Shades Creek, there has been an increasing concern for the creek and watershed health. The Shades Creek Watershed Management Plan, published in December 2021, identified the major problems as:

Water Quality and Pollution

- Excessive erosion and sedimentation
- Litter accumulation
- Excessive nutrient loading causing excessive algae growth

Stormwater Management and Infrastructure

- Poor flood management and stream rerouting causing increased erosion due to increased water velocity

Loss of Natural Habitat

- Urbanization and increased runoff volumes harming habitats

Public Education and Awareness

The plan promotes an increase in local regulation, public education, green infrastructure, and stream restoration to combat these issues.

Below is an incomprehensive list of groups that presently advocate for the preservation of Shades Creek:

Friends of Shades Creek – Founded in August 1998, the group consists of local citizens committed and is made possible through memberships and donations. They serve as advocates for Shade's creek and often coordinate cleanup efforts.

Ruffner Mountain Nature Preserve – Founded in 1977, the Ruffner Mountain Conservancy began as a movement to protect Ruffner Mountain's ecosystem from development. Shades Creek runs through the preservation and is protected in the park.

Cahaba River Society – Founded in 1988 with a mission to restore and protect the Cahaba River Watershed and its rich diversity of life. They work to improve local, state, and federal water quality protections, restore freshwater habitats, encourage recreation, and increase economic growth from tourism.
