= Bryan Payton =

American gridiron football player (born 1986)

No. 20
- Position: Linebacker

Personal information
- Born: August 2, 1986 (age 40); Camp Pendleton, California, U.S.
- Listed height: 6 ft 1 in (1.85 m)
- Listed weight: 216 lb (98 kg)

Career information
- College: Oregon State
- NFL draft: 2008: undrafted

Career history
- 2012: Toronto Argonauts

Awards and highlights
- Grey Cup champion (2012)
- Stats at CFL.ca (archive)

Bryan Payton (born August 2, 1986 in West Covina, California) is a professional Canadian football linebacker most recently for the Toronto Argonauts of the Canadian Football League. He signed as a free agent with the Argonauts on May 16, 2012. Payton was a member of the 100th Grey Cup winning team.

Born in Camp Pendleton, Payton attended West Covina High School in West Covina, California. He also played college football at Oregon State.
