= Edgewood Park =

Edgewood Park may refer to:

- Edgewood Historic District neighborhood in New Haven, Connecticut
- Edgewood Park in New Haven, Connecticut
- Edgewood Park & Natural Preserve, San Mateo County, California
- Edgewood Park neighborhood in Fort Erie, Ontario
- Edgewood Park neighborhood in Fort Wayne, Indiana
- Edgewood Park Historic District (New Orleans, Louisiana)
- Edgewood Park in Mississippi, containing Mississippi landmark train cars
- Edgewood Park, also called Indian Park, a now-defunct park in Shamokin, Pennsylvania
