= Edgewood Magnet School =

Coordinates: 41°19′05″N 72°57′38″W

Location
- 747 Edgewood Avenue; New Haven, Connecticut

Information
- Superintendent: Dr. Madeline Negrón
- Principal: Dr. Nicholas Perrone
- Colors: Green and Yellow
- Slogan: "Elevate Edgewood Excellence"
- Website: https://www.newhavenmagnetschools.com/index.php/edgewood-magnet

Edgewood Creative Thinking Through STEAM Magnet School is a STEAM magnet school located in New Haven, Connecticut. The school teaches kindergarten through eighth grade, and the principal is Dr. Nicholas Perrone. Edgewood was the first school redone in the New Haven school renovation project. There are approximately 450 students who attend the school.
