= Edgewood College Mound Group Archaeological District =

- U.S. National Register of Historic Places
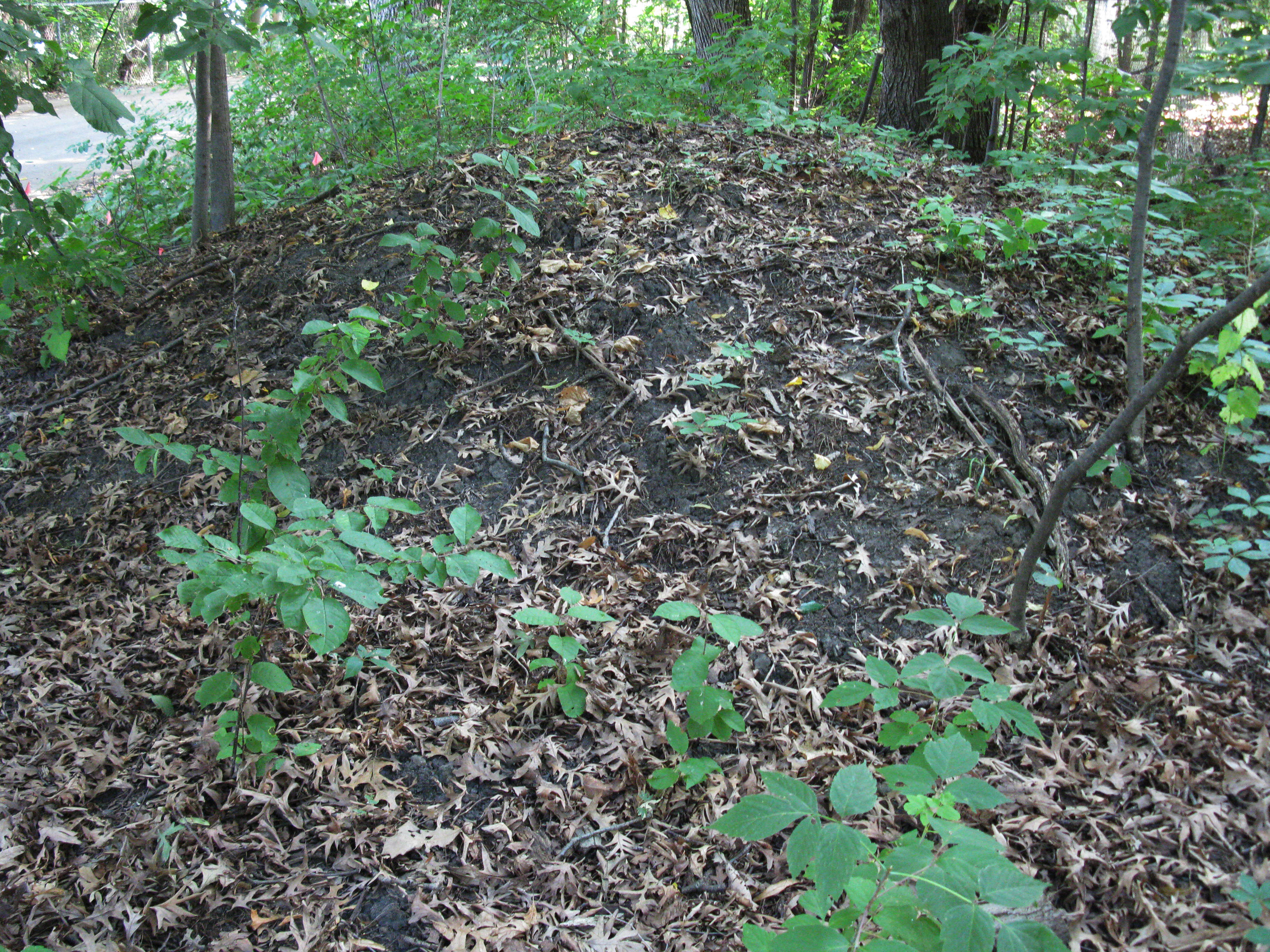
- Location: Edgewood College campus, Madison, Wisconsin
- Area: 1 acre (0.40 ha)
- MPS: Late Woodland Stage in Archeological Region 8 MPS
- NRHP reference No.: 91000669
- Added to NRHP: June 7, 1991

The Edgewood College Mound Group Archaeological District is a group of Native American mounds on the campus of Edgewood College in Madison, Wisconsin. The group includes two areas containing a total of 11-12 mounds; while there were once fifteen mounds at the site, the remainder have been destroyed by agriculture and construction. One of the mounds is a bird-shaped effigy, while the others are conical and linear; two other effigy mounds, both bear-shaped, were among those destroyed. The mounds were built by Late Woodland people between roughly 650 and 1200 A.D. White settlers likely first discovered the mounds in 1880; the establishment of Edgewood College in 1881 caused the mounds to be much more well-preserved than other groups in the area, some of which were completely destroyed.

The site was added to the National Register of Historic Places on June 7, 1991.
