= Edgewood Cutoff =

Railroad bypass in Southern Illinois and Kentucky

The Edgewood Cutoff is a 169-mile (273 km) single-track railroad line that runs in a north–south direction through southern Illinois and western Kentucky. Built by the Illinois Central (IC) Railroad, the Kentucky section of the line opened in 1927 and the Illinois section in 1928. The line is named for the hamlet of Edgewood, Illinois where the northern end of the cutoff diverges from the IC mainline. At the southern end, the line rejoins the IC mainline at Fulton, Kentucky at the Tennessee border. The Edgewood Cutoff was built to ease traffic congestion on the IC mainline primarily caused by the single-track bridge over the Ohio River at Cairo, Illinois. (The cutoff crosses the Ohio River at Metropolis, Illinois using the Paducah and Illinois Railroad's bridge.)

Due to its location, east of the IC mainline, trains running from Chicago to New Orleans would shave 22 miles (35 km) from their route by using the cutoff. Trains to and from St. Louis, however, would continue to use the old mainline through Cairo, as would all IC passenger trains. Even so, the cutoff would especially benefit heavy coal trains coming from western Kentucky.

The gradient profile of the line was a significant improvement over the old mainline, with a maximum of a 0.3% grade versus 1.2% on the Cairo line. The number of curves was greatly reduced as well. In fact, one section of tangent (straight) track on the cutoff is 63 miles (102 km) long. Sidings were located along the cutoff to permit trains to pass each other on the single-track line. The construction of three tunnels was necessitated along the route, all of which are located within the remote forested region of southern Illinois.

The IC spent approximately $17 million to build the Edgewood Cutoff. IC had also studied the possibility of reconstructing the Cairo line, although that project was estimated at $24 million and was never pursued. After the IC announced plans to build the cutoff on Christmas Day 1922, several communities along the Cairo route filed lawsuits to stop the new line from being built. They were unsuccessful.

After the cutoff opened, more and more trains were diverted to the new line, until within a few years the cutoff was handling more tonnage than the old line. In 1972, IC merged with GM&O to form the Illinois Central Gulf (ICG). The name was changed back to Illinois Central in 1988. Canadian National acquired IC in 1999 and instituted changes such as running most southbound trains over the Edgewood Cutoff and most northbound trains over the Cairo line. Amtrak currently uses the Cairo line. No passenger trains have ever been scheduled to run on the Edgewood Cutoff.
