= Maceda (surname) =

Maceda is a surname. Notable people with the surname include:

- Antonio Maceda (born 1957), Spanish footballer and manager
- Edward Maceda (born 1970), Filipino lawyer and politician
- Ernesto Maceda (1935–2016), Filipino politician
- Giselle Lazaro-Maceda (born 1970), Filipino dermatologist and politician
- Jim Maceda (born 1949), American journalist
- José Maceda (1917–2004), Filipino composer and ethnomusicologist
