= Edgewood, 1818 (Amherst, Virginia) =

Historic house in Virginia, United States

- Edgewood
- U.S. National Register of Historic Places
- Virginia Landmarks Register
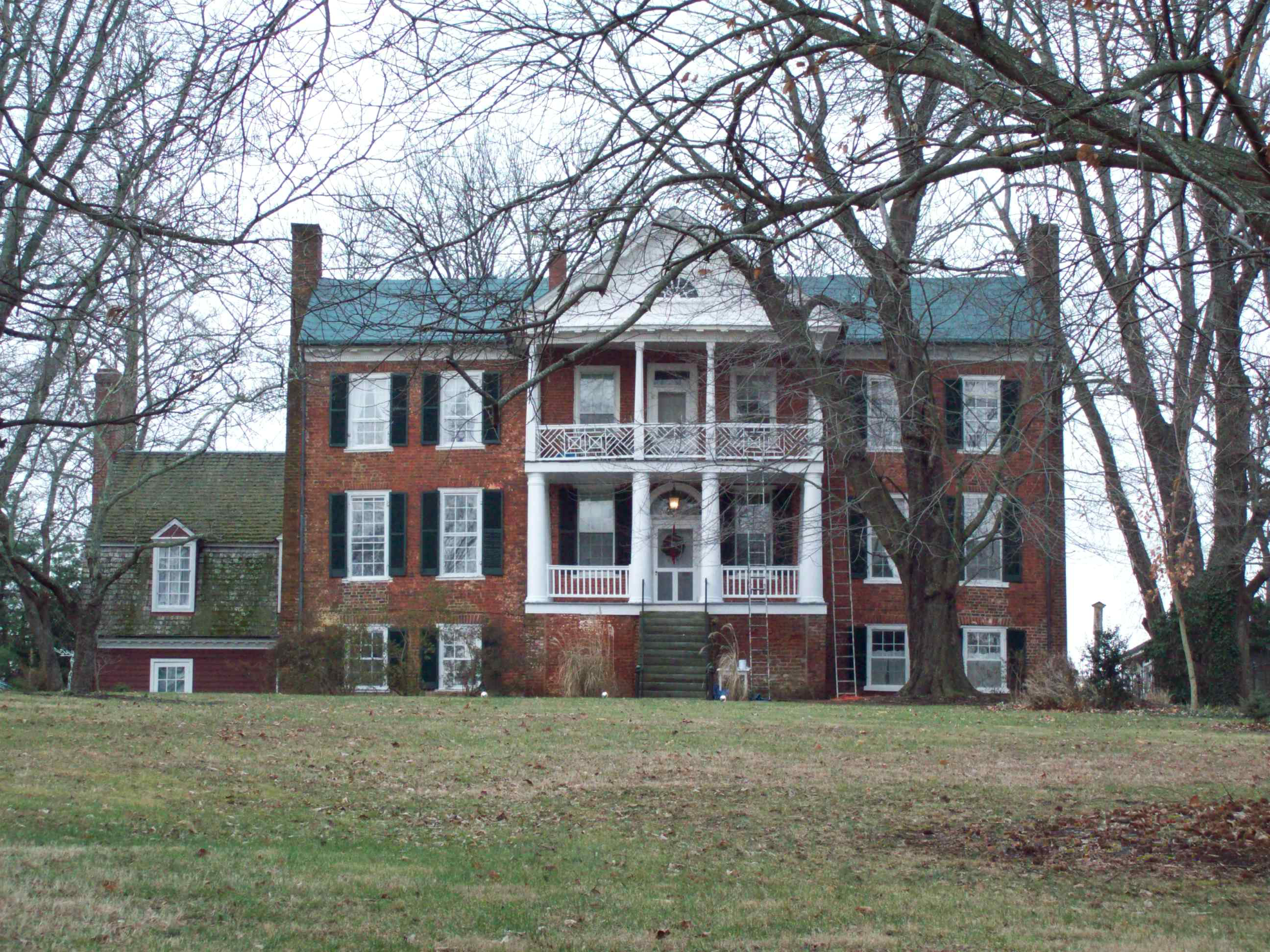
- Edgewood 1818, December 2008

- Location within Virginia Location within the United States
- Interactive map showing the location of Edgewood
- Location: 138 Garland Ave., Amherst, Virginia
- Coordinates: 37°35′01″N 79°03′20″W
- Built: 1818
- Architect: Davies, Arthur B.
- Architectural style: Federal, Greek Revival
- NRHP reference No.: 06000706
- VLR No.: 163-0003

Significant dates
- Added to NRHP: August 16, 2006
- Designated VLR: June 8, 2006

Edgewood, also known as Higginbotham House, is a historic home located at 138 Garland Avenue in Amherst, Amherst County, Virginia. It was built in 1818, by Arthur B. Davies a local attorney and Amherst County Court Clerk. It is a two-story, seven-bay, T-plan brick dwelling in the Greek Revival style. It sits on an English basement and features a two-story pedimented wooden portico. Additions made in 1972 are in the Federal style. The house retains most of its original woodwork and mantels, and features murals painted by an unknown local artist. The building housed the Higginbotham Academy from 1851 to 1860, as well as the local Masonic Hall, and meeting place for a Methodist congregation.

On August 16, 2006, it was added to the National Register of Historic Places.

== See also ==
- List of Registered Historic Places in Virginia, Counties A-B (Amherst County)
- Edgewood, 1858 (Amherst, Virginia), 591 Puppy Creek Road, also listed on the National Register
