= Edgewood Place Historic District =

Historic district in Wisconsin, United States

- U.S. National Register of Historic Places
- U.S. Historic district
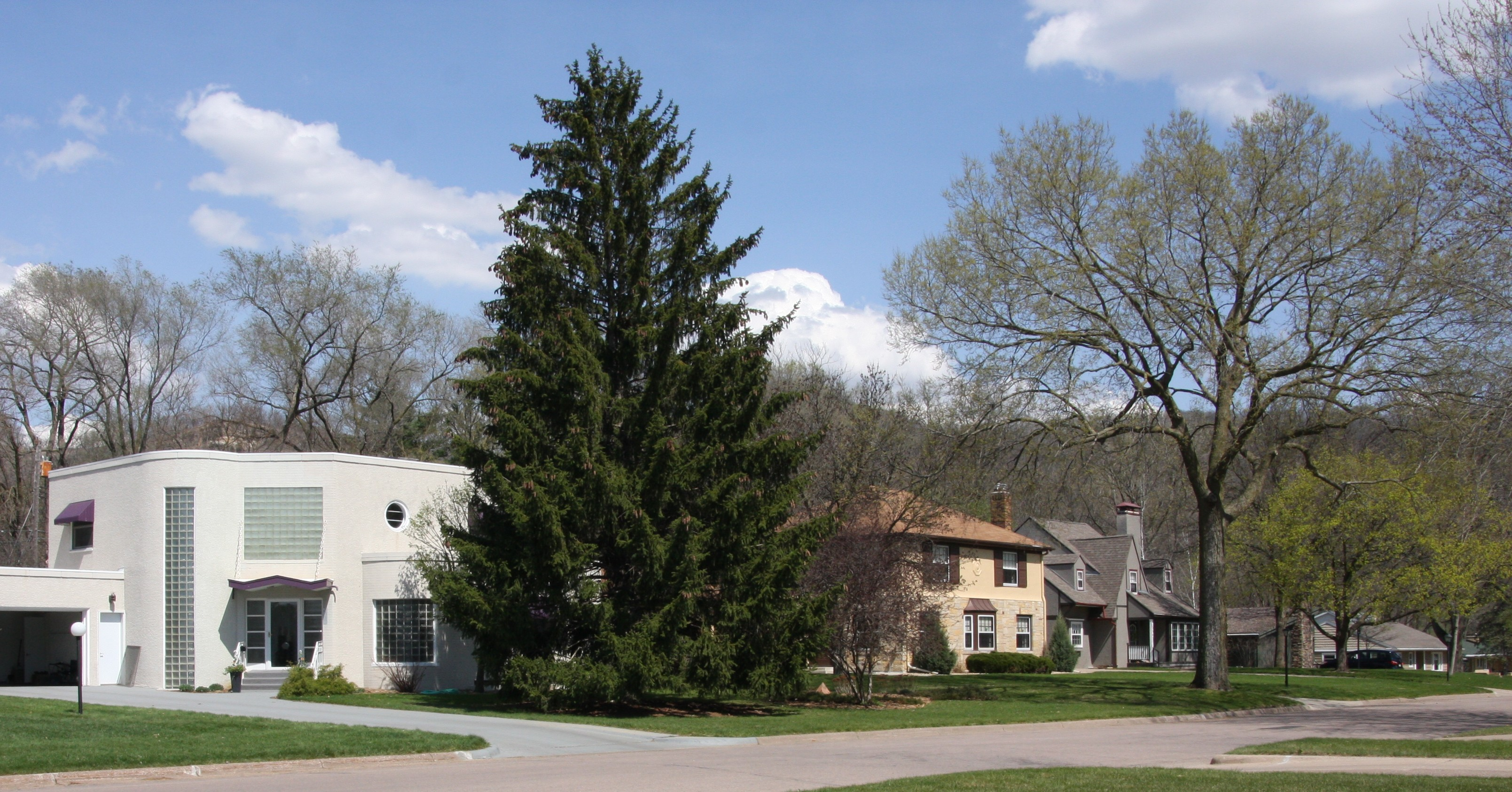

- Location within Wisconsin Location within the United States
- Location: La Crosse, Wisconsin
- NRHP reference No.: 10000867
- Added to NRHP: October 28, 2010

The Edgewood Place Historic District is a residential historic district located in La Crosse, Wisconsin, United States. It was added to the National Register of Historic Places in 2010.

== History ==
The district is a somewhat secluded neighborhood of period revival homes built from 1935 to 1940, in a variety of 20th Century styles, including the 1937 Colonial Revival Orton house, the 1937 Tudor Revival Wittich house, and the 1940 Art Moderne Denzer house.
