= Edgewood (Frederick, Maryland) =

Historic house in Maryland, United States

- Formerly listed on the U.S. National Register of Historic Places
- Location within Maryland Location within the United States
- Nearest city: North of Frederick off Poole Jones Rd., Frederick, Maryland
- Coordinates: 39°27′32″N 77°25′27″W
- Area: 13.3 acres (5.4 ha)
- Built: 1775
- Architectural style: Greek Revival
- NRHP reference No.: 79001129

Significant dates
- Added to NRHP: September 6, 1979
- Removed from NRHP: March 25, 2015

Edgewood was a historic home located at Frederick, Frederick County, Maryland, United States. It was a two-story multipart limestone farmhouse featuring narrow courses of native stone. The house was constructed and added to over the 18th and 19th century and reflects the Greek Revival style popular at that time. It is associated with the Schley family, prominent 19th century residents of Frederick County, who held the farm from 1830 until 1911.

Edgewood was listed on the National Register of Historic Places in 1979. It was destroyed by fire in 2010 and has been delisted from the register.
