= Edgewood Elementary School =

Edgewood School may refer to:

== United States ==
- Edgewood Elementary School, Pine Bluff, Arkansas
- Edgewood Elementary School, Brooklyn Park, Minnesota
- Edgewood Elementary School, Edgewood, Maryland
- Englewood Elementary School in the Salem-Keizer School District of Oregon

== Elsewhere ==
- Edgewood Elementary School, Prince George, British Columbia, Canada
- Edgewood Elementary School, Edgewood, British Columbia, Canada

== See also ==
- Edgewood Primary School, Hucknall, England
