= West Covina Unified School District =

School district in California, United States

Address
- 1717 West Merced Avenue West Covina, California, 91790; United States

District information
- Type: Public
- Grades: K–12
- NCES District ID: 0642000

Students and staff
- Students: 8,227 (2020–2021)
- Teachers: 392.97 (FTE)
- Staff: 524.53 (FTE)
- Student–teacher ratio: 20.94:1

Other information
- Website: www.wcusd.org

West Covina Unified School District (WCUSD) is a unified school district located and serves the city of West Covina, California. It is located in the San Gabriel Valley area. The members of the West Covina Board of Education are Eileen Miranda-Jimenez (Vice-President), Steve Cox (President), Mike Spence (Clerk), Cammie Poulos (Member), and Jessica Showmaker (Member). The last Superintendent of WCUSD was Liliam Leis-Castillo who was dismissed as superintendent of schools by the current school board on Thursday, May 12, 2011.

== Schools ==
There are 2 high schools (plus an alternative and a continuation), 3 middle schools, 8 elementary schools in the district.

Elementary Schools

- California Elementary School (3-6)
- Cameron Elementary School (K-5)
- Merced Elementary School (K-5)
- Merlinda Elementary School (K-6)
- Monte Vista Elementary School (K-6)
- Orangewood Elementary School (K-5)
- Vine Elementary School (K-5)
- Wescove Elementary School (K-2)

Middle and Intermediate Schools

- Edgewood Middle School (6-8)
- Hollencrest Middle School (6-8)
- Walnut Grove Intermediate School (7-8)

High Schools

- MT. SAC Early College Academy
- Coronado High School
- Edgewood High School
- West Covina High School
