= Edgewood, 1858 (Amherst, Virginia) =

Historic house in Virginia, United States

- Edgewood
- U.S. National Register of Historic Places
- Virginia Landmarks Register
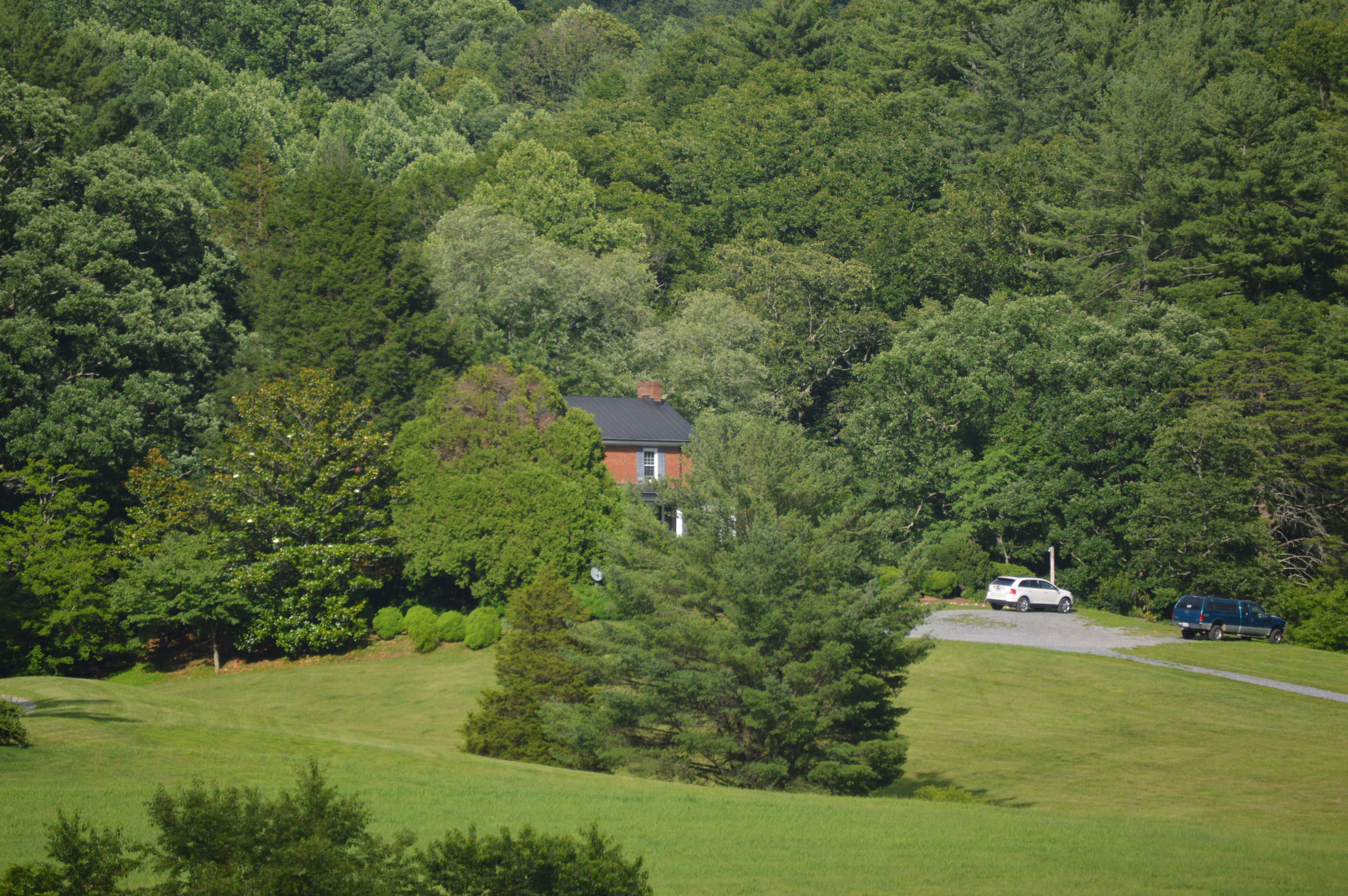
- Distant view of the house

- Location within Virginia Location within the United States
- Location: 591 Puppy Creek Rd., near Amherst, Virginia
- Coordinates: 37°39′20″N 79°08′59″W
- Area: 1,030 acres (420 ha)
- Built: 1858-1869
- Built by: Massie, Joseph Hardin
- Architectural style: Greek Revival
- NRHP reference No.: 08000200
- VLR No.: 005-0158

Significant dates
- Added to NRHP: March 14, 2008
- Designated VLR: December 5, 2007

Edgewood, also known as Massie House and Boulder Springs, is a historic home and farm located at 591 Puppy Creek Road near Amherst, Amherst County, Virginia. It was built by Joseph Hardin Massie between 1858 and 1869. It is a two-story, T-shaped plan, brick house, with a copper-clad gable roof in the Greek Revival style. The house was altered between 1900 and 1927. Also on the property are the contributing bank barn, a 19th-century corn crib, c. 1920 cattle corral, a 19th-century log house, a family cemetery and the ruins of outbuildings and secondary dwellings.

On March 14, 2008, it was added to the National Register of Historic Places.

== See also ==
- List of Registered Historic Places in Virginia, Counties A-B (Amherst County)
- Edgewood, 1818 (Amherst, Virginia), 138 Garland Avenue, also listed on the National Register
