= Brian Mitchell =

Brian Mitchell may refer to:

== Sports ==
- Bryan Mitchell (born 1991), American professional baseball pitcher
- Brian Mitchell (boxer) (born 1961), former professional boxer
- Brian Mitchell (kicker) (born 1969), college football player, Marshall University in 1987, University of Northern Iowa 1989–1991
- Brian Mitchell (running back) (born 1968), former American football running back and return specialist
- Brian Mitchell (American football coach) (born 1968), American football coach and former cornerback
- Brian Mitchell (cricketer) (born 1959), Australian cricketer
- Brian Mitchell (footballer) (born 1963), Scottish former professional footballer

== Arts and entertainment ==
- Brian Mitchell (musician), keyboard and accordion player, Brian Mitchell Band
- Brian Stokes Mitchell (born 1957), actor
- Brian Mitchell and Joseph Nixon, British comedy writing team

== Other ==
- Brian C. Mitchell (born 1953), president of Bucknell University
- Brian David Mitchell (born 1953), perpetrator of the Elizabeth Smart kidnapping
- Brian Mitchell (politician) (born 1967), Australian politician
- Brian Patrick Mitchell, American writer and political theorist
