= Edgewood, West Virginia =

Unincorporated community in West Virginia, United States

- Unincorporated community
- Location in West Virginia and the United States Edgewood (the United States)
- Coordinates: 38°22′48″N 81°38′37″W
- Country: United States
- State: West Virginia
- County: Kanawha
- Elevation: 1,033 ft (315 m)
- Time zone: UTC-5 (Eastern (EST))
  - Summer (DST): UTC-4 (EDT)
- GNIS ID: 1554369

Edgewood is an unincorporated community in Kanawha County, West Virginia, United States.
