= Derek Tennell =

American football player (born 1964)

No. 81, 46, 89
- Position: Tight end

Personal information
- Born: February 12, 1964 (age 62); Los Angeles, California, U.S.
- Listed height: 6 ft 5 in (1.96 m)
- Listed weight: 245 lb (111 kg)

Career information
- High school: West Covina (West Covina, California)
- College: UCLA
- NFL draft: 1987: 7th round, 185th overall pick

Career history
- Seattle Seahawks (1987)*; Cleveland Browns (1987–1989); San Francisco 49ers (1990)*; Detroit Lions (1991); Minnesota Vikings (1992); Dallas Cowboys (1992); Minnesota Vikings (1993)
- * Offseason or practice squad member only

Awards and highlights
- Super Bowl champion (XXVII)

Career NFL statistics
- Receptions: 40
- Receiving yards: 371
- Touchdowns: 5
- Stats at Pro Football Reference

Derek Wayne Tennell (born February 12, 1964) is an American former professional football player who was a tight end in the National Football League (NFL) for the Cleveland Browns, Detroit Lions, Dallas Cowboys, and Minnesota Vikings. He played college football for the UCLA Bruins. He won Super Bowl XXVII with Dallas.

== Early life ==
Tennell attended West Covina High School where he practiced football, basketball and track. In his senior year as a running back, he registered 807 rushing yards and 7 touchdowns.

In basketball, he averaged 19 points and 12.5 rebounds, while helping this team reach the Sierra League championship. In the 440-yard dash, he set the school record of 49.2 seconds.

== College career ==
Tennell accepted a football scholarship from the University of California, Los Angeles, and began his college career as a fullback. As a sophomore, he was converted into a tight end. He was named the starter and was fourth on the team with 20 receptions for 167 yards.

As a junior, he had 24 receptions (third on the team) for 252 yards (fourth on the team). As a senior, he posted 15 receptions for 152 yards and 3 touchdowns. He finished his college career as a three-year starter with 64 receptions for 602 yards and 3 touchdowns.

== Professional career ==
=== Seattle Seahawks ===
Tennell was selected by the Seattle Seahawks in the seventh round (185th overall) of the 1987 NFL draft. He was waived on September 8.

=== Cleveland Browns ===
In 1987, after the players went on a strike on the third week of the season, those games were canceled (reducing the 16-game season to 15) and the NFL decided that the games would be played with replacement players. Tennell was signed to be a part of the Cleveland Browns replacement team. He ended up playing well in those games as the starter at tight end and was kept for the rest of the season. He was the backup to Ozzie Newsome and played mainly on special teams.

In 1988, he started 3 games, registering 9 receptions for 88 yards and one touchdown. He was released on December 11, 1989.

=== San Francisco 49ers ===
In 1990, he was signed by the San Francisco 49ers and was cut on August 31.

=== Detroit Lions ===
On April 26, 1991, he was signed as a free agent by the Detroit Lions, before being released on August 26. He was later re-signed after the season opener and played in the NFC title game against the Washington Redskins. He was cut on August 31, 1992.

=== Minnesota Vikings (first stint) ===
On September 28, 1992, he was signed as a free agent by the Minnesota Vikings, after starter Mike Tice suffered an injury. On November 3, he was cut after playing in 3 games.

=== Dallas Cowboys ===
On December 29, 1992, he was signed as a free agent to replace blocking tight end Alfredo Roberts, who had suffered a season-ending right knee injury in the last game against the Chicago Bears. In the playoff 34–10 win against the Philadelphia Eagles, he scored a touchdown. He was a part of the Super Bowl XXVII winning team.

=== Minnesota Vikings (second stint) ===
On April 21, 1993, he was signed as a free agent by the Vikings. He was released on August 22, 1994.
