= Edgewood (Grassy Creek, North Carolina) =

Historic farm in North Carolina, United States

- U.S. National Register of Historic Places
- U.S. Historic district
- Location within North Carolina Location within the United States
- Location: NC 1437, near Grassy Creek, North Carolina
- Coordinates: 36°30′27″N 78°38′08″W
- Area: 8 acres (3.2 ha)
- Built: 1858
- Architectural style: Greek Revival, Italianate
- MPS: Granville County MPS
- NRHP reference No.: 88000421
- Added to NRHP: April 28, 1988

Edgewood is a historic tobacco plantation house and national historic district located near Grassy Creek, Granville County, North Carolina. The house was built about 1858, and is a two-story, double pile, Greek Revival style frame dwelling with Italianate style design elements. It has a low hipped roof pierced by two interior brick chimneys. Also on the property are the contributing meat house, "wash house," two stables, brooder house, ice house, two chicken houses, two corn cribs, and a hay barn.

It was listed on the National Register of Historic Places in 1988.
