= Edgewood (Montgomery, Alabama) =

Historic house in Alabama, United States

- U.S. National Register of Historic Places
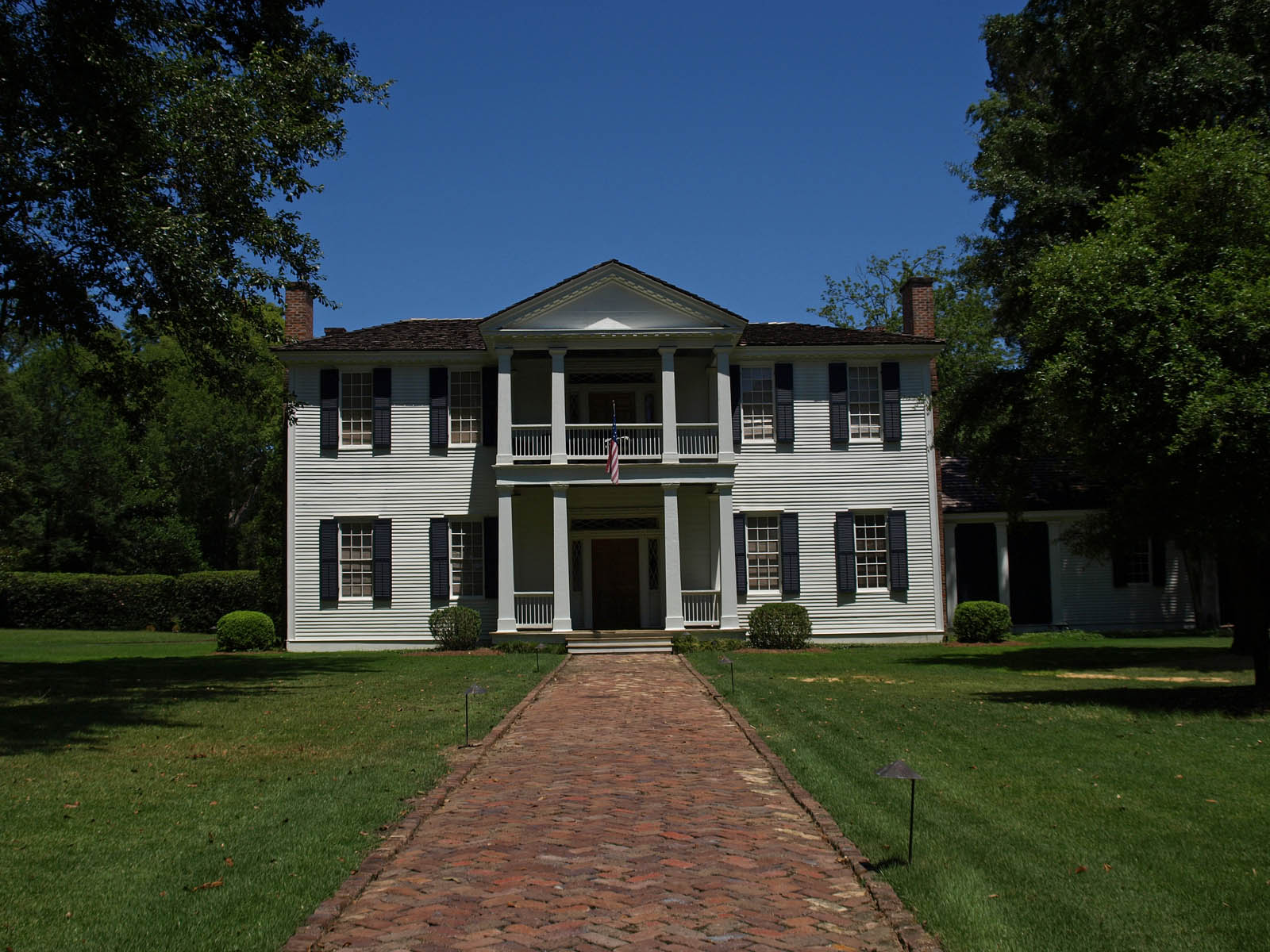
- Edgewood in 2009

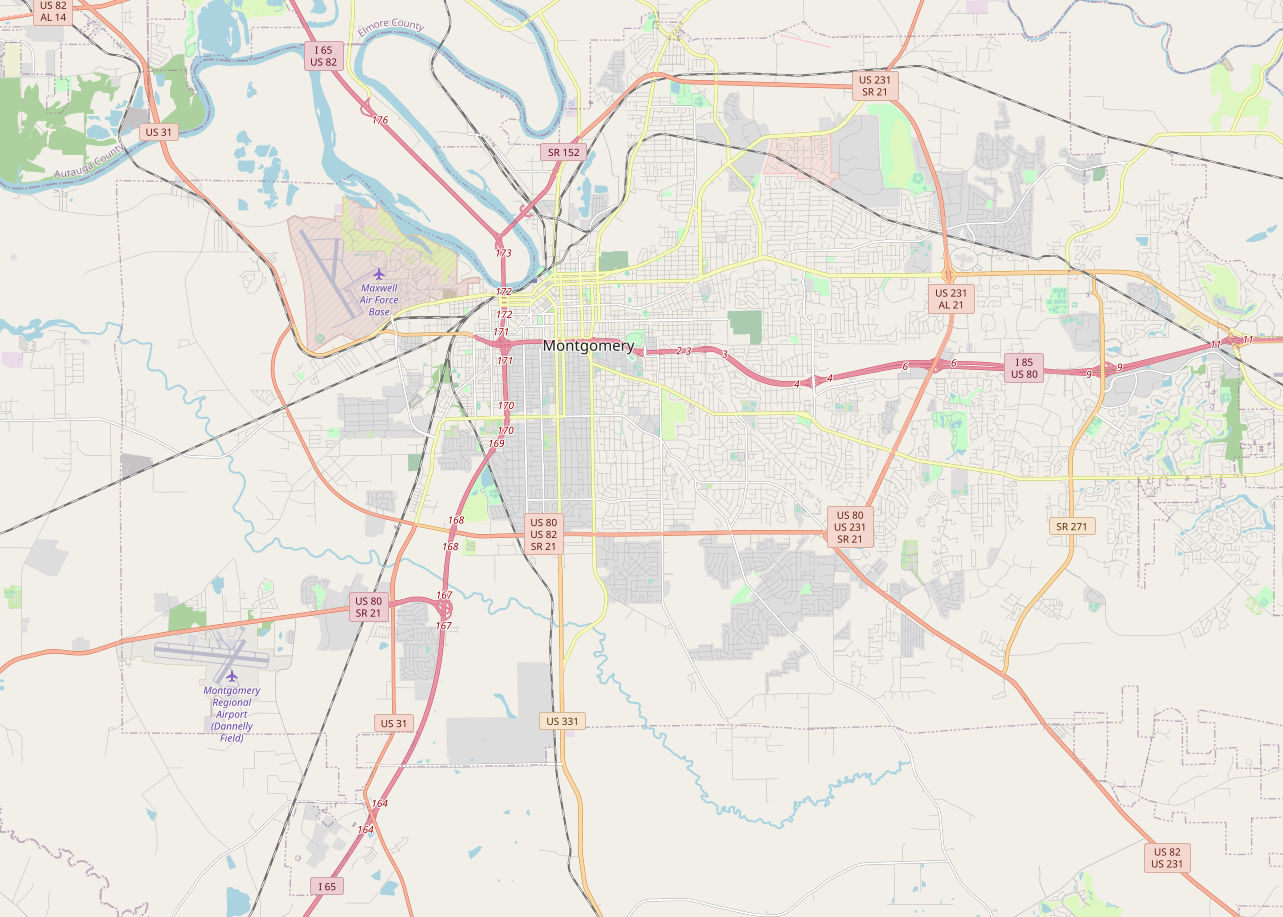
- Location within Montgomery, Alabama Location within Alabama Location within the United States
- Location: 3175 Thomas Avenue, Montgomery, Alabama
- Coordinates: 32°20′49″N 86°17′12″W
- Area: 2 acres (0.81 ha)
- Built: 1821
- Architect: Zachariah T. Watkins
- NRHP reference No.: 73000367
- Added to NRHP: April 24, 1973

Edgewood, also known as the Thomas House, is a historic Federal-style house in Montgomery, Alabama. The two-story frame building was built in 1821 by Zachariah T. Watkins. It is the oldest surviving residence in Montgomery. It was added to the National Register of Historic Places on April 24, 1973.
