= West Covina High School =

Public secondary school in West Covina, California, United States

Coordinates: 34.0635°N 117.9150°W

Location
- 1609 East Cameron Avenue; West Covina, California; United States

Information
- Type: Public Secondary
- Motto: Home of Scholars and Champions
- Established: 1957
- School district: West Covina Unified School District
- Principal: Dr. Charles Park
- Faculty: 88.81 (FTE)
- Grades: 09-12
- Enrollment: 1,887 (2022-23)
- Student to teacher ratio: 21.25
- Colors: Maroon and gold
- Athletics: Valle Vista League
- Mascot: The Bulldogs
- Rival: South Hills High School
- Newspaper: Insight
- Yearbook: Athenaeum
- Website: West Covina High School

West Covina High School (WCHS) is a four-year comprehensive secondary school located in West Covina, California, United States. It is located on the seized territory of the Tongva (Gabrieleno) People.

== History ==
West Covina High School opened in 1956 on the old Covina High School campus on Citrus Ave. and Puente Ave. as the Spartans. In 1957, the school moved to its new campus, which was built on an old cabbage patch, on Cameron Ave. and Fernwood St. Blue and white were the school colors. The Spartans were led by Principal Maurice Wooden, brother of the legendary UCLA Bruins men's basketball coach John Wooden. The first class graduated in 1958.

In 1988, West Covina Unified School District merged Edgewood High School and West Covina High School, bringing all students to its current campus. The new mascot became the Bulldog and maroon and gold were chosen as the new school colors.

In 2005, WCHS became fully accredited by the Western Association of Schools and Colleges and a California Distinguished School.

== Demographics ==
There has been a decrease in the percentage of white and African American students over the years with an increase in the number and percentage of Hispanic students. There is a large number of Asian American students, who are of mainly Filipino Chinese, Taiwanese and Vietnamese descent.

The ethnicity of the school in 2010-2011 was:

Hispanic/Latino: 2,078
Asian: 468
White: 210
African American: 125
American Indian/Alaska Native: 2
Pacific Islander: 7
Not reported: 2
Total: 2,892

== Athletics ==
The Bulldog athletic teams compete in the Valle Vista League of the CIF Southern Section.

- Previous Leagues: Sierra, San Antonio, Hacienda

=== State Championships ===
- Girls' Wrestling: 2011
- Girls' Wrestling: 2012

== Yearly API ==
Year	API base data	API growth data	Growth target	Actual growth
1998–1999	—	576	—	—
1999–2000	576	599	11	23
2000–2001	599	595	10	12
2001–2002	595	626	10	26
2002–2003	626	633	9	7
2003–2004	633	695	8	60
2004–2005	695	720	5	25
2005–2006	720	739	4	19
2006–2007	739	729	5	-10
2007–2008	729	748	5	20
2009–2010	748	751	5	3
2010–2011	751	774	5	23
2011–2012	774	TBD	5	TBD

== Notable alumni ==
- Bill Stoneman - (1962), MLB All Star pitcher and general manager
- Sandy Durko - (1966), NFL player
- Steve Myer - (1972), NFL player
- Tom Brunansky - (1978), MLB outfielder
- Nia Peeples - (1980), singer and actress
- Keith Smith - (1982), NBA player
- Derek Tennell - (1982), NFL player
- Joey Eischen - (1988), MLB pitcher
- Eddie Howard - (1990), NFL player
- Justin Lehr - (1995), MLB pitcher
- Bryan Payton - (2004), CFL player
- Walter Thurmond - (2005), NFL player
- Christian Yeung - (2005), actor, professional basketball player
- Emily Rios - (2007), actress
- Tonatiuh Elizarraraz - (2010), actor
- Sidney Jones - (2014), NFL player
- Alex Carrillo (2015), MLB pitcher
