= Edgewood, Louisville =

Neighborhood in Louisville, Kentucky

Coordinates: 38°10′01″N 85°42′56″W

Edgewood is a neighborhood on the south side of Louisville, Kentucky, United States. Its boundaries are Fern Valley Road to the south, I-65 to the west and Preston Highway to the north. Streets were laid out in the 1920s, but development was halted by the Great Depression. The area was also far from the city and had poor infrastructure. An improved sewage system after World War II and the large expansion of Standiford Field (now Louisville International Airport) spurred development of Edgewood and its annexation by Louisville in 1957.

The airport was increasingly a threat to the neighborhood, with the city buying many houses in the 1980s and noise becoming a problem after the expansion. A voluntary buyout plan was announced in 1996 for all residents of Edgewood.
