= Edgewood (Farmerville, Louisiana) =

Historic house in Louisiana, United States

- U.S. National Register of Historic Places
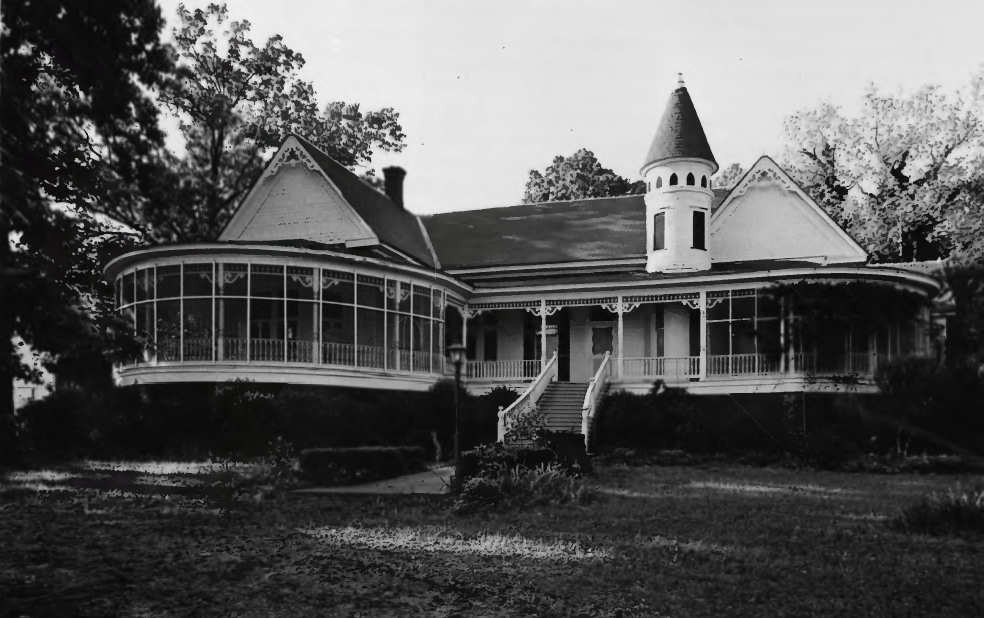

- Location within Louisiana Location within the United States
- Location: 1 mile west of Farmerville on the Bernice Highway, near Farmerville, Louisiana
- Coordinates: 32°47′12″N 92°25′30″W
- Area: 4 acres (1.6 ha)
- Built: 1902
- Built by: Baughman, J.D.
- Architectural style: Stick/eastlake, Queen Anne
- NRHP reference No.: 80001765
- Added to NRHP: October 8, 1980

Edgewood, in Union Parish, Louisiana near Farmerville is a historic house built in 1902. It is also known as Edgewood Plantation and, in 2017, is operated as a bed & breakfast inn.

It is a one-story frame house raised almost a full story above the ground, located on "a grassy rise" amongst oak trees on the shore of Lake D'Arbonne.

It includes Queen Anne and Eastlake architecture.

The house has an L-shaped plan. Its parlor has a semi-hexagonal bay which is sheathed by a curving Eastlake gallery. Its living room has an alcove inside a thin turret which protrudes above the roof line. The roof line has seven gables, three of which are ornamented by scroll-sawn millwork.
