= Jim Maceda =

American journalist

- Born: James Maceda; January 18, 1949 (age 76)
- Occupation: Television journalist
- Known for: Foreign Correspondent for NBC News

James Maceda (born January 18, 1949) is a retired journalist, who was a foreign correspondent for NBC News based in London. He was with NBC for nearly 35 years before retiring in early 2015.
