= Edgewood Lake (Alabama) =

Coordinates: 33°27′22″N 86°48′11″W

- Interactive map of Edgewood Lake
- Location: Homewood, Alabama
- Type: Former lake
- Primary inflows: Shades Creek
- Primary outflows: Drained
- Basin countries: United States
- Surface area: 117 acres (47 ha)
- Website: Edgewood Lake at BhamWiki.com

Edgewood Lake was located in Homewood, Alabama, from 1913 until 1946 when the lake was drained. The lake was formed by damming Shades Creek near Green Springs Highway. Developed as part of the town of Edgewood, the 117-acre (47 ha) lake was the center of a planned auto racing track that was never completed. The dry lake bed was conveyed to Howard College (now Samford University) in 1947 and decades later redeveloped in various ways.
