= Edgewood Lake (Rhode Island) =

Lake in Providence, Rhode Island, United States

- Location within Rhode Island Location within the United States
- Location: Providence, Rhode Island
- Coordinates: 41°46′55″N 71°24′18″W
- Basin countries: United States
- Surface elevation: 26 ft (8 m)

Edgewood Lake is a lake in the southern part of the city of Providence, Rhode Island.
