= Edgewood (Natchez, Mississippi) =

Historic house in Mississippi, United States

- U.S. National Register of Historic Places
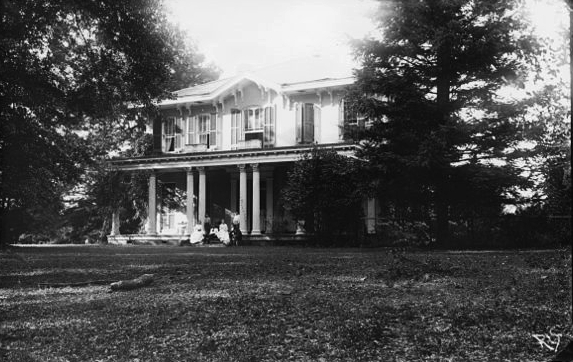
- Edgewood c. 1920

- Location within Mississippi Location within the United States
- Location: Natchez, Mississippi
- Area: 90 acres (36 ha)
- Built: 1860
- Architect: Howard & Diettel
- Architectural style: Italianate
- NRHP reference No.: 79001283
- Added to NRHP: March 30, 1979

Edgewood, also known as Edgewood Plantation, is a historic house near Natchez, Adams County, Mississippi.

== History ==
It was designed in the Italianate architectural style by New Orleans architects Howard & Diettel and was built by contractor Thomas Rose. It is a south-facing house two stories tall at the front and three stores at the rear. It has two-story service wings on both sides. It has a hipped roof with an overhang supported by paired brackets.

It has a dark pink facade.

It has been listed on the National Register of Historic Places since 1979.
