= The Taking of Pelham 123 (2009 film) =

Film by Tony Scott

- Theatrical release poster
- Directed by: Tony Scott
- Screenplay by: Brian Helgeland
- Based on: The Taking of Pelham One Two Three; 1973 novel by John Godey
- Produced by: Todd Black; Tony Scott; Jason Blumenthal; Steve Tisch
- Starring: Denzel Washington; John Travolta; John Turturro; Luis Guzmán; Michael Rispoli; James Gandolfini
- Cinematography: Tobias A. Schliessler
- Edited by: Chris Lebenzon
- Music by: Harry Gregson-Williams
- Production companies: Columbia Pictures; Metro-Goldwyn-Mayer Pictures; Relativity Media; Scott Free Productions; Escape Artists
- Distributed by: Sony Pictures Releasing
- Release date: June 12, 2009
- Running time: 106 minutes
- Country: United States
- Language: English
- Budget: $100–110 million
- Box office: $150.2 million

The Taking of Pelham 123 is a 2009 American action thriller film directed by Tony Scott from a screenplay by Brian Helgeland. It is the third film adaptation of the John Godey novel of the same name (following the 1974 theatrical film and 1998 television film).

The film is about a train dispatcher, who is pressed into the role of negotiator after a criminal hijacks a subway car of passengers.

The film was released by Sony Pictures Releasing on June 12, 2009. It grossed $150.2 million against a production budget of $100–110 million and received mixed reviews from critics.

== Plot ==
'Ryder' and his accomplices – Bashkin, Emri, and former train operator Phil Ramos – hijack Pelham 123, a New York City Subway 6 train, at 77th Street. Uncoupling the front car of the train below 51st Street, Bashkin kills an intervening plainclothes New York City Transit Police officer as they take its passengers hostage.

26 year Metropolitan Transportation Authority veteran Walter Garber, working in the Rail Control Center as a train dispatcher, receives a call from Ryder, demanding $10 million in cash to be paid within 60 minutes. Ryder warns that for every minute past the deadline he will kill a hostage. Garber reluctantly negotiates with him, while Ramos and Emri set up Internet access in the tunnel.

On his laptop, Ryder watches the Dow Jones Industrial Average plunge nearly 1,000 points in response to the hijacking. A hostage's laptop also connects to the Internet, and its webcam allows the control center to observe Ryder and Ramos. Garber's boss sends him home as Lieutenant Camonetti of the New York City Police Department Emergency Service Unit takes over negotiations. Infuriated, Ryder kills the train's motorman Jerry Pollard to force Camonetti to bring Garber back into the building.

Camonetti learns that Garber is being investigated for allegedly accepting a $35,000 bribe over a contract for new subway cars. Ryder also finds the allegations online, forcing Garber to confess by threatening to kill a teenager. To save the hostage, Garber says he was offered the bribe while deciding between two companies, using the money to pay for his daughters' college tuition, but insists he would have made the same decision regardless.

The mayor authorizes payment of the ransom and a police car is dispatched to transport the money to the subway station. En route, the police car crashes, failing to deliver the money on time. An enraged Ryder threatens to execute a child's mother, but another hostage, former soldier Wallace, sacrifices himself and is killed.

A brief gunfight erupts after an Emergency Service Unit sniper is bitten by a rat and discharges his weapon, killing Ramos. Ryder demands Garber deliver the ransom money himself to avoid having contact with the police. Garber is flown to the terminal, where he is given a pistol for protection.

The police discover Ryder is Dennis Ford, a former stockbroker who ran a private equity firm on Wall Street. He was sentenced to prison for embezzling $20 million from the city's pension fund, his biggest client. Ford had taken a plea bargain to serve three years, but eventually received a ten-year sentence because he failed to make full restitution.

Ford spent the last four years of his nine-year stretch in the same cell block as Ramos, and was released from Clinton Correctional Facility two weeks ago. One of the mayor's aides mentions the extreme drop in the major stock indexes. So, the mayor infers that Ryder is manipulating the market via put options.

Ryder brings Garber aboard, ordering him to move the train to just below 33rd Street. There Garber and the hijackers exit the train, rigging it to go on without them. Garber manages to slip away from his captors in the tunnels, then follows Ryder to Track 61 underneath the Waldorf Astoria hotel. Ryder parts from Bashkin and Emri, who are shot dead after being surrounded by police and provoking deadly force in an apparent suicide by cop. The train screeches to a halt safely just before Coney Island (West 8th Street-New York Aquarium), where the police discover Ryder is gone.

Ryder hails a taxi, with Garber following on foot, and finds out that his scheme has amassed $307 million. Garber commandeers a truck and pursues him. After a brief chase, they reach the Manhattan Bridge's pedestrian walkway, where Garber catches up with Ryder and holds him at gunpoint.

Ryder, adamant about not returning to prison, gives Garber a 10-second ultimatum to pull the trigger. In the final seconds, he pulls out his own gun, forcing him to shoot him in the chest. Ryder dies as Garber solemnly looks on and Camonetti observes approvingly from a helicopter. The mayor thanks him, promising the city will "go to bat" for him over his bribery admission. Garber returns home to his wife Theresa, with the milk he had promised to bring.

== Cast ==
- Denzel Washington as Walter Garber, an MTA subway dispatcher, who is negotiating with the hijackers. The negotiator in the 1974 film was a transit policeman named Lt. Zachary Garber (portrayed by Walter Matthau); Edward James Olmos played Detective Anthony Piscotti, the negotiator in the 1998 television movie.
- John Travolta as Dennis 'Ryder' Ford / Mr. Blue, the leader of the hijackers. Instead of playing a mercenary, he plays a former Wall Street "high roller" who blames New York City and the mayor for causing him to stay in prison for 10 years, longer than his plea deal of three years. Travolta earned $20 million for his work in the film. The role was originally portrayed by Robert Shaw in the 1974 film. Vincent D'Onofrio played Ryder in the 1998 TV movie. In the first two movies, Ryder used the alias "Mr. Blue".
- John Turturro as Lieutenant Vincent Camonetti, hostage negotiator with the NYPD's Emergency Service Unit.
- Luis Guzman as Phil Ramos / Mr. Green, former MTA motorman, one of the hijackers. The role, originally named "Harold Longman", alias "Mr. Green", was portrayed by Martin Balsam in the 1974 film. Richard Schiff played him in the 1998 film.
- Michael Rispoli as John Johnson, Garber's boss and head of the MTA's Rail Control Center
- James Gandolfini as the Mayor of New York, who is under heavy pressure to address the hostage crisis. The character was originally portrayed by Lee Wallace in the 1974 film.
- Frank Wood as Police Commissioner Sterman
- John Benjamin Hickey as Deputy Mayor LaSalle
- Gary Basaraba as Jerry Pollard, original motorman of the hijacked train
- Ramon Rodriguez as Delgado, an MTA train dispatcher
- Gbenga Akinnagbe as Wallace, one of the hostages on the train.
- Katherine Sigismund as Mother
- Aunjanue Ellis as Theresa, Garber's wife
- Alex Kaluzhsky as George
- Tonye Patano as Regina, MTA conductor on the hijacked train
- Jason Butler Harner as Mr. Thomas, a hostage who has to pee
- Robert Vataj as Emri / Mr. Brown, the stammering young gun, who helps hijack the train under the command of Ryder. The character originally named "Steever" was portrayed by Earl Hindman in the 1974 film.
- Jake Siciliano as an eight-year-old boy who is held hostage with his mom.
- Victor Gojcaj as Bashkin / Mr. Gray, the most aggressive of the hijackers. The character, originally named "Joe Welcome", alias "Mr. Grey", was portrayed by Hector Elizondo in the 1974 film. Donnie Wahlberg played him in the 1998 TV movie.
- Brian Haley as Police Captain Hill
- Adrian Martinez as Cabbie

== Differences ==
The first drafts of the script faced the challenge of updating the novel with contemporary technology, including cell phones, global positioning systems, the Internet, laptops, and thermal imaging, as well as the environment of a post-9/11 world in New York City. In December 2007, David Koepp, who adapted the novel for Scott and Washington said:

I wrote many drafts to try and put it in the present day and keep all the great execution that was there from the first one. It’s thirty years later so you have to take certain things into account. Hopefully we came up with a clever way to move it to the present.

Koepp's drafts were meant to be "essentially familiar" to those who read the novel, preserving the "great hero vs. villain thing" of the original. Brian Helgeland, the only one who received credit for the screenplay, took the script in a different direction, making the remake more like the 1974 film than the novel and, as Helgeland put it, making it about "two guys who weren't necessarily all that different from each other". As writer Michael Ordoña describes it:

Whereas the novel is told from more than 30 perspectives — keeping readers off balance because it is unknown which characters the writer might suddenly discard — the two films focus on the lead hijacker and the Metropolitan Transportation Authority employee with whom he communicates by phone. The new version sharpens that focus until it's almost exclusively a duel between disgraced MTA dispatcher Walter Garber and manic gunman Ryder.

In the book and original film, Ryder is "cold-blooded and calculating", but in the 2009 film, he is a "loose cannon willing to kill innocents not out of necessity but out of spite". Also, Ryder in the original film and book is portrayed as a normal-looking businessman, while in the 2009 film, he looks as if he has adopted prison life, sporting very visible prison tattoos, and the laid-back style of a biker.

In the 1974 film, the main character (played by Walter Matthau) is named Zachary Garber and is a lieutenant in the transit police; in the 2009 film, the main character (played by Denzel Washington) is named Walter Garber (which incidentally may be an in-house tribute to the late Walter Matthau), and works as a subway train dispatcher.

Ryder also demands $10 million instead of $1 million as in the original film and book or $5 million in the made-for-TV film. Ryder does not use the "Mr. Blue" nickname as in the original film. Instead, Ryder is a nickname adopted by Dennis Ford.

In the 1974 film, the train-operating hostage-taker is the only member of the group to live long enough to see himself behind bars, while all of the hostage-takers die in the 2009 film.

== Production ==
Production began in March 2008 with all cast and crew being required to attend a track safety course taught by MTA personnel, as much of the filming would take place in the subway on active tracks. For the initial hijack sequence at Grand Central on the Flushing Line, the crew used the westbound track during late night hours while regular 7 train service operated in both directions on the eastbound track. An R142A train (the model previously used on the 6 train at the time) was used for the Grand Central sequence. Many locations in Brooklyn were used during filming. A large portion was filmed on the Transit Museum local track between the Hoyt–Schermerhorn Streets station and the New York Transit Museum on the Fulton Street Line.

For exterior filming only, R62A car #2079 was used during filming to give the appearance of an R142A car. Interior car scenes were filmed at the Kaufman Astoria Studios in Queens on a set that more closely resembles the newer and larger R160B (which were still being delivered at the time of filming). Outdoor street filming locations were the lower level of the Manhattan Bridge; Tudor City, including the First Avenue tunnel near the Headquarters of the United Nations; the Upper East Side; Times Square and the Theater District area; the Whitlock Avenue station on the Pelham Line in Hunts Point, Bronx; and Turtle Bay. Some scenes were also shot in Lower Manhattan.

The scene with the police leaving the Brooklyn Federal Reserve, which does not exist, was actually the rear of the United States Postal Service Office of the Inspector General, located next to the World Trade Center, in front of the PATH station entrance.

== Release and marketing ==
The film was originally scheduled to release on July 31, 2009, but the release was moved earlier to June 12, 2009. The first theatrical poster was released on February 10, 2009, while the first trailer for the film debuted at the screenings of The International on February 13, 2009.

John Travolta decided against promoting the film, as it was released just five months after the death of his 16-year-old son, Jett. He stated that he still was not ready to step back into the spotlight. Travolta released the following statement:

Tony, Denzel, Luis, John, James and Sony Pictures stepped up without hesitation to help promote this wonderful film, and their unselfish efforts have allowed my family the additional time to reconcile our loss. I am very proud of the efforts we have all made in making this movie, and I want each and every one of you to enjoy it. So, set your calendars for the weekend of June 12th. I promise you won't be disappointed. Thank you all from the bottom of my heart.

== Reception ==
=== Critical response ===
On Rotten Tomatoes, The Taking of Pelham 123 has an approval rating of 51% based on 230 reviews, with an average rating of 5.45/10. The site's critical consensus says: "Despite a strong cast, The Taking of Pelham 1 2 3 suffers under the excesses of Tony Scott's frantic direction, and fails to measure up to the 1974 original." On Metacritic the film has a weighted average score of 55 out of 100, based on 33 critics, indicating "mixed or average reviews". Audiences polled by CinemaScore gave the film an average grade of "B+" on an A+ to F scale.

Jim Ridley of the Village Voice noted that the new Pelham film was not as good as the original: "Scott's redo comes up short in almost every regard against the '74 model ... If it's somehow unfair to compare the two, why was The Taking of Pelham 123 even remade?" "As expected, Tony Scott’s hyperkinetic, entirely unnecessary revamp attempts to update Pelham by cranking the volume and inflating the Noo Yawk attitude to a cartoonish level of macho posturing," wrote Sean Burns in Philadelphia Weekly. Writing in New York Press, Armond White was critical of Tony Scott's direction: "Tony Scott’s craft cannot create suspense, it substitutes noise, cursing and brutality." Michael Rechtshaffen of The Hollywood Reporter noted: "Even with the plot's built-in ticking clock, the film relinquishes the tautly calibrated pace in the third act, never to get completely back on track." David Edelstein's review for New York Magazine carried the headline "The Taking of Pelham 123 is not worth running down a flight of subway-station stairs for."

Roger Ebert gave the film two and a half stars, and began his review with "There's not much wrong with Tony Scott's The Taking of Pelham 123, except that there's not much really right about it." Ebert commented that the lead actors lacked passion in their performances: "Oh, John Travolta is angry and Denzel Washington is determined, but you don’t sense passion in the performances. They’re about behaving, not evoking." He also compared it unfavorably with the 1974 original, calling it "less juicy" and opining that the special effects are "not an improvement". Christy Lemire of the Associated Press gave the film two out of four stars, and called it "another overcaffeinated thriller".

Writing for the Orlando Sentinel, Roger Moore gave the film three out of five stars, and commented "Pelham, for its crowd-pleasing heart-racing virtues ... plays out like a Tony–Denzel pairing that Denzel, at least, should have taken a pass on." In a review for MSNBC, Alonso Duralde was critical of John Travolta's performance in the film, comparing it to his roles in Swordfish (2001) and Battlefield Earth (2000): "Travolta remains singularly unbelievable as a villain. In movies like this and Swordfish and, let's not forget, Battlefield Earth, the actor strives for malice but generally can’t get much darker than playground-bully meanness." Peter Travers, writing for Rolling Stone, gave the film 3.5 stars out of 4, stating, "This movie hits you like 600 volts from a sparking third rail. Damn straight it's electrifying [...] The only letdown comes in Scott's handling of the passengers, who remain frustratingly generic."

Film critic Ignatiy Vishnevetsky, writing in his blog, commented that he loved the film, and thought it was one of three of Scott's great movies of the 2000s, saying: "... the coherence in his films is not between the pages of a script; it's between shots, and his greatest asset (both to himself and to cinema as a whole) is his ability to construct scenes out of shots that take place across great distances of space or time, as in his two best movies: Déjà Vu (much of whose running time consists of characters watching a past event through a sort of time machine) and his remake of The Taking of Pelham 123 (where the two main characters develop a complex relationship, despite not meeting until the end of the movie)."

In 2025, The Hollywood Reporter listed The Taking of Pelham 123 as having the best stunts of 2009.

=== Box office ===
The film debuted in the number three spot with approximately US$25 million at the box office in the United States in its opening weekend, in what The New York Times called "an unusually quiet weekend at the box office because of soft ticket sales for The Taking of Pelham 123". The film was beaten out by The Hangover and Up for the number one and number two spots. The Taking of Pelham 123 had a production budget of $100 million and was co-financed with Relativity Media and Sony Pictures. Ben Fritz of the Los Angeles Times commented on the box office results of the film's opening weekend ($23,373,102): "Although far from disastrous, that's a soft start for a film budgeted at more than $100 million." The film earned $150,166,126 worldwide during its release from June 12 to August 23, 2009.

== Home media ==
DVD and Blu-ray versions of the movie with bonus features were released on November 3, 2009. The film opened up at No. 3 at the DVD sales chart, making $14.1m off 919,000 DVD units in the first week of release. These features included commentaries and behind-the-scenes featurettes. In South Korea, the DVD and Blu-ray were released in October, 2009. The digital release of the film is in 16x9 open matte.
