= The Taking of Pelham One Two Three (1974 film) =

1974 film directed by Joseph Sargent

- Original film poster by Mort Künstler
- Directed by: Joseph Sargent
- Screenplay by: Peter Stone
- Based on: The Taking of Pelham One Two Three (1973 novel) by John Godey
- Produced by: Gabriel Katzka; Edgar J. Scherick
- Starring: Walter Matthau; Robert Shaw; Martin Balsam; Héctor Elizondo
- Cinematography: Owen Roizman
- Edited by: Gerald B. Greenberg; Robert Q. Lovett
- Music by: David Shire
- Production companies: Palomar Pictures; Palladium Productions
- Distributed by: United Artists
- Release date: October 2, 1974
- Running time: 104 minutes
- Country: United States
- Language: English
- Budget: $3.8 million
- Box office: $18.7 million

The Taking of Pelham One Two Three (also known as The Taking of Pelham 1 2 3) is a 1974 American action thriller film directed by Joseph Sargent and starring Walter Matthau, Robert Shaw, Martin Balsam and Héctor Elizondo. Peter Stone adapted the screenplay from the 1973 novel written by Morton Freedgood under the pen name John Godey.

The film follows a group of criminals who hijack a New York City Subway car and hold the passengers for ransom. The title is derived from the train's radio call sign, which is based on where and when the train began its run. In this case, the train originated at the Pelham Bay Park station in the Bronx at 1:23 p.m. For several years after the film was released, the New York City Transit Authority would not schedule any train to leave Pelham Bay Park station at 1:23.

Several critics called it one of 1974's finest films, and it was a box-office success. The musical score by David Shire has been described as "one of the best and most inventive thriller scores of the 1970s". The film was nominated for Best Original Music, as well as Best Actor in a Supporting Role (for Martin Balsam), at the 29th British Academy Film Awards. It was remade in 1998 as a television film and in 2009 as a theatrical film.

== Plot ==
In New York City, four men wearing similar disguises and carrying concealed weapons board the same downtown 6 train, "Pelham 1-2-3," at different stations. Using their code names Mr. Blue, Mr. Green, Mr. Grey and Mr. Brown, they take 18 people, including the conductor and an off-duty undercover police officer, hostage in the front car.

Communicating over the radio with New York City Transit Police lieutenant Zachary Garber, Blue demands that a $1 million (Note: Approximately $6.8 million in 2026.) ransom be delivered within exactly one hour or he will kill one hostage for every minute it is late. Green occasionally sneezes due to a cold, to which Garber always responds, "Gesundheit". Garber, Lt. Rico Patrone and others cooperate while speculating about the hijackers' escape plan. Garber surmises that one hijacker must be a former motorman because the hijackers uncoupled the head car and parked it further down the tunnel below 28th Street.

Conversations between the hijackers reveal that Blue is a former British Army colonel and was a mercenary in Africa; Green was a motorman who lost his job after being caught in a drug bust; and Blue does not trust Grey, who was ousted from the Mafia for being erratic. Unexpectedly, Grey guns down a transit supervisor from Grand Central as he approaches the hijacked train.

The ransom is transported uptown in a speeding police car that crashes before arriving at 28th Street. As the deadline is reached, Garber tricks Blue by claiming that the money has reached the station entrance and just has to be walked down the tunnel to the train. Meanwhile, a police motorcycle arrives with the ransom. As two patrolmen carry the money down the tunnel, one of the many police snipers in the tunnel shoots at Brown, and the hijackers exchange gunfire with them. In retaliation, Blue kills the conductor.

The money is delivered and divided among the hijackers. Blue orders Garber to restore power to the subway line, set the signals to green all the way to South Ferry, and clear the police from stations along the route. Before this is done, however, Green moves the train further south. When Garber becomes alarmed, Blue explains that he wanted more distance from the police inside the tunnel.

The hijackers override the dead man's switch so that the train will run without anyone at the controls. Garber joins Inspector Daniels above ground where the train stopped. The hijackers set the train in motion and get off. As they walk to the tunnel's emergency exit, the undercover officer jumps off the train and hides between the rails. Unaware that the hijackers have left the train, Garber and Daniels drive south above its route. With nobody at the controls, the train gains speed.

The hijackers collect their disguises and weapons for disposal, but Grey refuses to surrender his gun, resulting in a stand-off with Blue, who kills him. The undercover officer kills Brown and exchanges fire with Blue while Green escapes through an emergency exit onto the street.

Garber, considering the train's suspicious last movement, concludes the hijackers have bypassed the dead man's switch and are no longer on board. He returns to where the train had stopped, enters the same emergency exit from street level, and confronts Blue before he kills the undercover cop. With no escape, Blue deliberately steps against the third rail and electrocutes himself.

Meanwhile, Pelham 1-2-3 hurtles through the southbound tunnel. When it enters the South Ferry loop, its speed triggers the automatic safeties. The train screeches to a halt, leaving the hostages bruised but safe.

Since none of the dead hijackers was a motorman, Garber infers who the lone survivor must be. Working their way through a list of recently discharged motormen, Garber and Patrone knock on the door of Harold Longman (Green). After hiding the loot, Longman lets them in, bluffs his way through their interrogation and complains indignantly about being suspected. Garber vows to return with a search warrant. As Garber closes the apartment door behind him, Longman sneezes, and Garber reflexively says "Gesundheit", as he had over the radio. Garber reopens the door and gives Longman a caustic stare.

== Cast ==
- Walter Matthau as Transit Police Lt. Zachary Garber
- Robert Shaw as Bernard Ryder ("Mr. Blue")
- Martin Balsam as Harold Longman ("Mr. Green")
- Héctor Elizondo as Giuseppe Benvenuto ("Mr. Grey")
- Earl Hindman as George Steever ("Mr. Brown")
- James Broderick as Denny Doyle
- Dick O'Neill as Frank Correll
- Lee Wallace as the Mayor of New York City
- Tony Roberts as Deputy Mayor Warren LaSalle
- Tom Pedi as Caz Dolowicz
- Beatrice Winde as Mrs. Jenkins
- Jerry Stiller as Transit Police Lt. Rico Patrone
- Nathan George as Transit Patrolman Artis James
- Julius Harris as NYPD Deputy Chief Inspector Daniels
- Kenneth McMillan as NYPD Borough Commander
- Rudy Bond as NYPD Commissioner
- Sal Viscuso as NYPD Patrolman O'Keefe
- Doris Roberts as the mayor's wife
- Ruth Attaway as the mayor's nurse
- Walter Jones as Mr. Mattson, senior train conductor
- Conrad Yama as Mr. Tomashita
- Joe Seneca as Police Sergeant
- Bill Cobbs as Man on Platform

The hostages

- Jerry Holland as Bud Carmondy, junior train conductor
- George Lee Miles as the pimp
- Anna Berger as the mother
- Gary Bolling as the homosexual
- Carol Cole as the secretary
- Alex Colon as the delivery boy
- Joseph A. Fields as the salesman
- Mari Gorman as the hooker
- Michael Gorrin as the old man
- Maria Landa as the Hispanic woman
- Louise Larabee as the alcoholic
- William Snickowski as the hippie/plainclothes policeman
- Barry Snyder as the W.A.S.P.
- Lucy Saroyan and Carolyn Nelson as the Coeds

== Production ==
John Godey's novel was published in February 1973 by Putnam, but Palomar Productions had secured the film rights, and Dell had bought the paperback rights months earlier in September 1972. The paperback rights sold for US$450,000 (equivalent to $3.46 million in 2025).

Godey (Morton Freedgood) was a "subway buff". The novel and the film came out during the so-called "Golden Age" of skyjacking in the United States from 1968 through 1979. Additionally, New York City was edging toward a financial crisis. Crime had risen citywide, and the subway was perceived as neither safe nor reliable.

At first, the New York City Transit Authority (TA) refused to cooperate with the filmmakers. Godey's novel was more detailed about how the hijackers would accomplish their goal and recognized that the caper's success did not rely solely on defeating the "deadman feature" in the motorman's cab. Screenwriter Peter Stone, however, made a fictional override mechanism the linchpin of the script. Director Joseph Sargent explained, "We're making a movie, not a handbook on subway hijacking. ... I must admit the seriousness of Pelham never occurred to me until we got the initial TA reaction. They thought it potentially a stimulant—not to hardened professional criminals like the ones in our movie, but to kooks. Cold professionals can see the absurdities of the plot right off, but kooks don't reason it out. That's why they're kooks. Yes, we gladly gave in about the 'deadman feature'. Any responsible filmmaker would if he stumbled onto something that could spread into a new form of madness."

Sargent said, "It's important that we don't be too plausible. We're counting on the film's style and charm and comedy to say, subliminally at least, 'Don't take us too seriously.'" The credits have a disclaimer that the TA did not give advice or information for use in the film.

After eight weeks of negotiations, and through the influence of Mayor John Lindsay, the TA relented, but required that the producers take out $20 million in insurance policies, including special "kook coverage" in case the movie inspired a real-life hijacking. This was in addition to a $250,000 fee for use of the track, station, subway cars and TA personnel.

The TA also insisted that no graffiti appear in the film. Graffiti had become increasingly prevalent on trains starting in 1969. Mayor Lindsay had first announced his intention to remove graffiti in 1972, but the last graffiti-covered car was not removed until 1989. "New Yorkers are going to hoot when they see our spotless subway cars", Sargent said. "But the TA was adamant on that score. They said to show graffiti would be to glorify it. We argued that it was artistically expressive. But we got nowhere. They said the graffiti fad would be dead by the time the movie got out. I really doubt that."

Other changes included beefing up Walter Matthau's role. In the novel, Zachary Garber is the equivalent of the Rico Patrone character in the film played by Jerry Stiller. "I like the piece", Matthau said. "It moves swiftly and stays interesting right down to the wire. That's the reason I wanted to do it. The TA inspector I play is really a supporting role—they built it up a bit when I expressed interest in it—but it's still secondary." In the novel, Inspector Daniels confronts Mr. Blue in the tunnel during the climax. Additionally, screenwriter Peter Stone gave the hijackers their color code names, with hats whose colors matched their code names, as well as Harold Longman (Martin Balsam) his telltale cold.

Filming began on November 23, 1973, and was completed in late April 1974. The budget was $3.8 million.

=== Filming locations ===
Production began with scenes inside the subway tunnel. These were filmed over the course of eight weeks on the tracks of the IND Fulton Street Line at the abandoned Court Street station in Brooklyn. Closed to the public in 1946, it became a filming location and later home to the New York Transit Museum. Among other films, the Court Street station was used for The French Connection (1971), Death Wish (1974), and the 2009 remake of Pelham.

The production company placed chess boards, card tables, and ping pong tables along the Court Street platform for cast and crew recreation between set-ups. Robert Shaw apparently beat all comers in ping pong.

Although this was an abandoned spur of track, passing A, E and GG trains rumbled through adjacent tracks on their regular schedules. Dialogue that was marred by the noise was later post-dubbed. The third rail, which carries 600 volts of direct current, was shut off, and three protective bars were placed against the rail, but the cast and crew were told to treat it as if it were still live. "Those TA people ... are super careful," Sargent said. "They anticipate everything. By the fifth week we were dancing our way through those tunnels like nobody's business. They were expecting that, too. That's when they told us of the fatalities in the tunnels. They're mostly old-timers. The young guys still have a healthy fear of the place."

"There was one scene where Robert Shaw was to step on the third rail", Sargent recalled. "When we were rehearsing the scene, Shaw accidentally stubbed his toe and the sparks from his special-effects boot flew everywhere. He turned white as a sheet. We had eight weeks of that. I think we got out just in time."

Shaw's biographer John French reported, "There were rats everywhere and every time someone jumped from the train, or tripped over the lines, clouds of black dust rose into the air, making it impossible to shoot until it had settled. It was stiflingly hot and the noise from the frequent trains braking on the approach to the nearby Hoyt-Schermerhorn Station was deafening. At the end of a day’s work, actors and crew alike emerged looking as though they had been mining for coal."

According to Backstage, the filmmakers were the first to use a "flash" process developed by Movielabs to bring out detail when shooting with low light in the tunnel. The process reportedly increased film speed by two stops. It allowed the filmmakers to use fewer lights and generators, and cut five days out of the schedule.

At least two R22 trains portrayed Pelham 123. As it enters the 28th Street station, the head car is labeled 7339. However, in an early scene at Grand Central, 7339 is seen on the express track across the platform. Later, after being cut from the rest of the train, the head car is labeled 7434.

After two months in the tunnel, production moved to Filmways Studios at 246 East 127th Street in East Harlem, where a replica of the Transit Authority's Brooklyn control center was constructed.

The exterior street scenes above the hijacked subway train were filmed at the subway entrance at 28th and Park Avenue South in Manhattan. The mayor's residence, Gracie Mansion, was used for exteriors. Wave Hill, a nineteenth-century mansion overlooking the Hudson River in Riverdale, Bronx, was used for the interior scenes set in Gracie Mansion.

=== Music ===
The score, composed and conducted by David Shire, "layers explosive horn arrangements and serpentine keyboard riffs over a rhythm section that pits hard-grooving basslines against constantly shifting but always insistent layers of percussion". Shire used the 12-tone composition method to create unusual, somewhat dissonant melodic elements.

The soundtrack album was the first CD release by Film Score Monthly and was soon released by Retrograde Records. The end titles contain a more expansive arrangement of the theme, courtesy of Shire's wife at the time, Talia Shire, who suggested that he end the score with a more traditional ode to New York.

== Release ==
The Taking of Pelham One Two Three was released to theaters on October 2, 1974.

=== Critical reception ===
The film holds a 98% score on Rotten Tomatoes based on 44 reviews and a weighted average of 8.3/10. The site's consensus reads: "Breezy, thrilling, and quite funny, The Taking of Pelham One Two Three sees Walter Matthau and Robert Shaw pitted against each other in effortlessly high form."

The Boston Globe called the film "fast, funny and fairly terrifying" and "a nerve-racking ride", and appreciated the "wry humor" of Stone's script. It tapped into a darker reality: "A short time ago subways were safe; today some of them are full of the dark rage of asylums. And who really is to say a Pelham-type incident is out of the question?"

Charles Champlin of the Los Angeles Times deemed it "coarse-textured and effective, a cartoon-vivid melodrama and not, it's nice to know, a case study of psychopathic behavior. Pelham is in fact the best to date of the new multiple-jeopardy capers, fresh, lively and suspenseful... . There are some marvelously managed scenes in the subway tunnels and on teeming platforms and at the barricaded street-level entrances. The subway nerve center is fascinating, and indeed one of the pleasures of the film is its glimpse of how things work... . The violence is handled with restraint; the dangers are mixed with raucous humor and what stays clear is that the aim is swift entertainment."

Roger Ebert of the Chicago Sun-Times saw The Taking of Pelham One Two Three as an extension of 1970s disaster films such as The Poseidon Adventure or The Towering Inferno. He was initially skeptical of the subway-held-for-ransom premise, but gave the film a rating of 3 stars out of 4, praising its "unforced realism" shown in Matthau's "gruff, shaggy and sardonic" portrayal and the mayor being concerned about opinion polling, as well as the believable supporting characters who elevated what could have been a predictable crime thriller. In conclusion, Ebert wrote: "We care about the people not the plot mechanics. And what could have been formula trash turns out to be fairly classy trash, after all."

Gene Siskel of the Chicago Tribune also gave the movie 3 stars out of 4, describing it as a "solid new thriller laced with equal amounts of tension and comedy".

The Taking of Pelham One Two Three was one of several movies released that year which gave New York a bad image, including Law and Disorder, Death Wish, Serpico and The Super Cops. Vincent Canby of The New York Times, wrote: "New York is a mess, say these films. It's run by fools. Its citizens are at the mercy of its criminals who, as often as not, are protected by an unholy alliance of civil libertarians and crooked cops. The air is foul. The traffic impossible. Services are diminishing and the morale is such that ordering a cup of coffee in a diner can turn into a request for a fat lip." But The Taking of Pelham One Two Three, "compared to the general run of New York City films, is practically a tonic, a good-humored, often witty suspense melodrama in which the representatives of law and decency triumph without bending the rules."

Nora Sayre, another critic for The New York Times, thought it captured the mood of New York and New Yorkers, writing: "Throughout there's a skillful balance between the vulnerability of New Yorkers and the drastic, provocative sense of comedy that thrives all over our sidewalks. And the hijacking seems like a perfectly probable event for this town. (Perhaps the only element of fantasy is the implication that the city's departments could function so smoothly together). Meanwhile, the movie adds up to a fine piece of reporting—and it's the only action picture I've seen this year that has a rousing plot."

However, there was criticism, even from those who liked the movie. For example: Variety called it "a good action caper", but "the major liability is Peter Stone's screenplay, which develops little interest in either Matthau or Shaw's gang, nor the innocent hostages", who are "simply stereotyped baggage". Although the trade paper complained that the Mayor was "played for silly laughs", it called Shaw "superb in another versatile characterization".

BoxOffice also thought that "some of the excitement has been lost" translating the novel to the screen, but "there is entertainment value in Peter Stone's screenplay".

=== Accolades ===
==== 29th British Academy Film Awards ====
- 1976: Nominated, Best Film Music—David Shire
- 1976: Nominated, Best Supporting Actor—Martin Balsam

==== 27th Writers Guild of America Awards ====
- 1975: Nominated, Best Drama Adapted from Another Medium—Peter Stone

== Remakes ==
In 1998, the film was remade as a television film with the same title, featuring Edward James Olmos as Detective Anthony Piscotti, in the role that Walter Matthau played in the original film, and Vincent D'Onofrio replacing Shaw as the senior hijacker Mr. Blue. It was filmed in Toronto, Ontario.

Another remake, set in post 9/11 New York City, directed by Tony Scott and starring Denzel Washington and John Travolta, was released in 2009 to mixed reviews.

== Legacy ==
The color-coded thieves' names in Reservoir Dogs were a deliberate homage by Quentin Tarantino to The Taking of Pelham One Two Three. The film has also been cited as an inspiration for the cinematography of the 2024 film Anora by Sean Baker.

== See also ==
- List of American films of 1974
- The Incident (1967)
