= The Wall-to-Wall Trap =

1957 novel by Morton Freedgood

- Author: Morton Freedgood
- Language: English
- Publisher: Simon & Schuster
- Publication date: 1957
- OCLC: 987678
- LC Class: PZ3.G54225 Wal

The Wall-to-Wall Trap (published in 1957) is a novel by Morton Freedgood. Unlike his crime novels penned under the name John Godey, Morton Freedgood wrote this novel under his own name having worked for years in the publicity departments at several movie companies.

The novel's name has a double meaning. It is a play on wall-to-wall carpeting, signifying one of the many modern luxuries enjoyed by the main character, a high-paid publicity executive, who feels trapped in his position at a movie production company.

== Plot ==
Ted is a publicity department executive at the Manhattan office of Above All Pictures, a movie production company in the mid-1950s. His high salary affords him a nice car and furnishes his large apartment, where he lives with his wife, Roxy, and their two children. Although Ted has experience in the specious marketing game played between publicists, actors, directors, producers, and tabloid journalists, he feels trapped in office politics after a rumor is started that he is about to be fired by his new boss, Larry.

Larry takes the Machiavellian approach to management, even convincing Ted to shed crocodile tears over his potentially destitute family during a business dinner with a magazine editor. Ted hopes to secure a headlining article to back up a publicity stunt for Above All's latest movie. Without the article, Ted's stunt will backfire, the movie may flop, and Ted is certain to be fired.

Ted's former boss, Willie – who had left Above All to be a television executive in Chicago, Illinois – had a more lenient management approach. Willie is virtually blind to incompetence and seeks unconditional loyalty. He surrounds himself with yes men and rewards those that let Willie all but run their lives for them. Ted perceives it as security through fealty. Before Ted leaves Above All for Chicago, he and Willie have a falling-out.

Ted now strives to prove himself to Larry and the other executives at Above All, to thwart the rumor of his imminent firing. Ted acknowledges Larry's cutthroat methods, but prefers the stress over sucking up to Willie. Ted's wife wants him to reconcile with Willie and take a cushy, stress-free job in Chicago. Ted contemplates leaving the industry altogether, knowing it will mean sacrificing his lavish lifestyle and his socializing with the well-to-dos in the movie industry.
