= The Taking of Pelham One Two Three (novel) =

1973 novel by Morton Freedgood

- First edition (publ. G. P. Putnam's Sons)
- Author: Morton Freedgood
- Language: English
- Publication date: 1973

The Taking of Pelham One Two Three is a 1973 thriller novel by Morton Freedgood, writing under the pen name John Godey. The novel's title is derived from the train's radio call sign. When a New York City Subway train leaves to start a run, it is given a call sign based upon the time it left and where; in this case, Pelham Bay Park station at 1:23 p.m.

== Plot ==
A normal day on the subway is disrupted by the hijacking of a 6 train, designated Pelham One Two Three to indicate its point and time of origin. Four men armed with submachine guns detach the lead car and drive it into a tunnel with its 17 passengers as hostages. The hijackers are led by Ryder, a former mercenary, and consist of disgruntled former motorman Longman; violent ex-Mafia thug Joey Welcome; and powerful, laconic brute Steever. The gang threaten to execute one hostage per minute unless the city delivers to them a one million dollar ransom within one hour. One of the hostages is an armed undercover police officer, who considers the odds too overwhelming to attempt any confrontation and remains seated and quiet.

While the city authorities weigh it up and agree to pay, the transit police try to figure out the hijackers' plan, particularly their escape from a tunnel while completely surrounded. They do not suspect that the hijackers have a mechanism, "The Gimmick", for defeating the train's dead-man's switch, which prevents the train from running without a driver's hand pressing down on it. The hijackers intend to let the train and its hostages speed along the track by itself, chased by the police above surface, while they get away. They will discard their weapons and escape through an emergency exit, disappearing into the busy flow of New York pedestrians.

The ransom is delivered to the hijackers, who then demand that the track ahead is cleared all the way to South Ferry. They move the train a short distance down the tunnel, fit The Gimmick, get off the train, rig the neighboring southbound express track with grenades, and engage The Gimmick to hold down the dead-man's switch. Once the train is underway the gang makes their way to an emergency exit and the undercover police officer jumps off into the tunnel.

At the emergency exit, Welcome refuses to leave his submachine gun behind and argues with Ryder. Ryder fatally shoots him, but the delay allows the undercover cop to shoot Steever from the darkness of the tunnel. Simultaneously, DCI Daniels of the Special Operations Division attempts to pursue the now-uncontrolled lead car of Pelham 123 on the express track in a subway car and sets off the two grenades. Longman escapes while Ryder fires back and wounds the cop. As Ryder goes to finish him off with a head shot, he is himself shot dead by DCI Daniels. Later, the transit police go through their records of dismissed motormen and track down and arrest Longman.

== Adaptations ==
The novel has been adapted to film and television three times:

- The Taking of Pelham One Two Three (1974)
- The Taking of Pelham One Two Three (1998)
- The Taking of Pelham 123 (2009)

== Aftermath ==
For many years after the 1974 movie adaptation was released, the New York City Transit Authority barred its planners from scheduling trains leaving Pelham station at 1:23 a.m. or p.m., realizing that it would become too much of a reminder to the public. Eventually this policy was rescinded, but as of 1991, due to the superstitions involved, dispatchers have continued to avoid scheduling a Manhattan-bound train to leave Pelham at 1:23.

== Publication data ==
- Godey, John (1974). The Taking of Pelham One Two Three. New York: Dell Books. ISBN 0399110941. LCCN 72092306. OCLC 836555078.
