= Morton Freedgood =

American writer

- Born: 1913; Brooklyn, New York City, New York, U.S.
- Died: April 16, 2006 (aged 92–93); West New York, New Jersey, U.S.
- Writing career
- Pen name: John Godey
- Years active: 1940s–2006
- Genres: Detective fiction, Mystery fiction

Morton Freedgood (1913 – April 16, 2006) was an American author who wrote The Taking of Pelham One Two Three and many other detective and mystery novels under the pen name John Godey.

== Biography ==
Freedgood was born in Brooklyn, New York City, New York in 1913 and began writing at a young age. In the 1940s, he had several articles and short stories published in Cosmopolitan, Collier's, Esquire and other magazines while working full-time in the motion picture industry in New York City. He held public relations and publicity posts for United Artists, 20th Century Fox, Paramount and other companies for several years before focusing on his writing. Freedgood also served as an infantryman in the U.S. Army during World War II.

His novel The Wall-to-Wall Trap was published under his own name in 1957. He then began using the pen name John Godey—borrowed from the name of a 19th-century women's magazine—to differentiate his crime novels from his more serious writing.

As Godey, he achieved commercial success with the books A Thrill a Minute With Jack Albany, Never Put Off Till Tomorrow What You Can Kill Today and The Three Worlds of Johnny Handsome (adapted by Walter Hill into the 1989 Morgan Freeman-Mickey Rourke thriller Johnny Handsome). He saw his Jack Albany stories turned into the 1968 Walt Disney film Never a Dull Moment, starring Dick Van Dyke. The Taking of Pelham One Two Three, his novel about the hijacking of a New York City Subway train, was a best seller in 1973 and was made into the 1974 movie starring Walter Matthau and Robert Shaw, a 1998 TV-movie remake of the same title, and a 2009 theatrical-feature remake, The Taking of Pelham 1 2 3.

He died April 16, 2006, in his home in West New York, NJ.

== Bibliography ==
Published under his pen name John Godey unless otherwise noted.

Year	Title	Type/Notes
1947	Yankee Trader	Novel - historical fiction. Written with his brother Stanley under the pseudonym "Stanley Morton". Published by Sheridan House.
1947	The Gun and Mr. Smith	Novel. Published by Doubleday/Crime Club.
1948	The Blue Hour	Novel. Published by Doubleday/Crime Club.
1951	The Man in Question	Novel. Published by Doubleday/Crime Club.
1953	This Year's Death	Novel. Published by Doubleday/Crime Club.
1957	The Wall-to-Wall Trap	Novel. Written under his own name. Published by Simon & Schuster.
1959	The Clay Assassin	Novel. Published by T.V. Boardman-UK.
1960	The Fifth House	Novel. Published by T.V. Boardman-UK.
1967	A Thrill a Minute with Jack Albany	Novel. Character Jack Albany. Published by Simon & Schuster. Released as The Reluctant Assassin in 1966 by Robert Hale Ltd-UK.
1970	Never Put Off Till Tomorrow What You Can Kill Today	Novel. Character Jack Albany. Published by Random House.
1972	The Three Worlds of Johnny Handsome	Novel. Published by Random House. Basis for the 1989 film Johnny Handsome.
1973	The Taking of Pelham One Two Three	Novel. Published by G.P. Putnam's Sons. Filmed in 1974.
1974	The Crime of the Century and Other Misdemeanors: Recollections of Boyhood	Memoir (of Morton Freedgood under his pen name John Godey). Published by G. P. Putnam's Sons.
1976	The Talisman	Novel. Published by G.P. Putnam's Sons.
1978	The Snake	Novel. Published by G.P. Putnam's Sons.
1981	Nella	Novel. Published by Delacorte Press.
1984	Fatal Beauty	Novel. Published by Atheneum.
