= The Taking of Pelham One Two Three (1998 film) =

American television crime thriller film

- Home video cover art
- Genre: Crime; Thriller
- Based on: The Taking of Pelham One Two Three by Peter Stone; The Taking of Pelham One Two Three by John Godey
- Written by: April Smith
- Directed by: Félix Enríquez Alcalá
- Starring: Edward James Olmos; Vincent D'Onofrio; Donnie Wahlberg; Richard Schiff; Lorraine Bracco
- Music by: Stewart Copeland
- Country of origin: United States
- Original language: English

Production
- Executive producers: John Watson; Richard B. Lewis; Pen Densham
- Producer: Karen Moore
- Cinematography: Félix Enríquez Alcalá
- Editor: Robert A. Ferretti
- Running time: 90 minutes
- Production companies: Trilogy Entertainment Group; MGM Television

Original release
- Network: ABC
- Release: February 1, 1998

The Taking of Pelham One Two Three is a 1998 American television crime thriller film directed by Félix Enríquez Alcalá and starring Edward James Olmos, Vincent D'Onofrio, Donnie Wahlberg, and Lorraine Bracco. It is a television adaptation of the novel of the same name by Morton Freedgood (writing under the pseudonym John Godey), and is a remake of the 1974 film adaptation. It was followed by a 2009 remake.

== Premise ==
Edward James Olmos plays Detective Anthony Piscotti, a New York City police officer. He is trying to crack the hijacking of a New York City Subway train where the antagonists, led by Vincent D'Onofrio as Mr. Blue, are holding the passengers for ransom.

== Cast ==
- Edward James Olmos as Detective Anthony Piscotti
- Vincent D'Onofrio as Mr. Blue
- Richard Schiff as Mr. Green
- Donnie Wahlberg as Mr. Grey
- Tara Rosling as Mr. Brown
- Lisa Vidal as Barbara 'Babs' Cardoza
- Kenneth Welsh as Caz Hollowitz
- Lorraine Bracco as Detective Ray
- Ben Cook as Older Boy on Subway
- Bobby Boriello as Younger Boy on Subway
- Bobby O'Neill as Homeboy on Subway (as Black Katt)
- Ingrid Veninger as Graduate Student on Subway
- Alisa Wiegers as Office Worker ["Shaky"]
- Peter Boretski as Old Man on Subway
- Stuart Clow as Jogger
- Michael A. Miranda as Denny Alcala
- Sandi Ross as Mrs. Jenkins
- Louis Del Grande as Frank Stonehouse
- Gary Reineke as Deputy Mayor
- Richard Fitzpatrick as Borough Commander
- Roy Lewis as Officer Artis Washington
- Philip Akin as ESU Lieutenant
- Judah Katz as TV Reporter
- Catherine Blythe as Video Camerawoman

== Production details ==
The film is a remake, with Edward James Olmos in the Walter Matthau role and Vincent D'Onofrio replacing Robert Shaw as the lead hijacker. Although not particularly well received by critics or viewers, this version was reportedly more faithful to the book, specifically in the rigging of the hijacked train for the getaway.

The film was shot in Toronto's TTC subway system, mainly using the system's Bay, St. Andrew, Castle Frank, Broadview, Woodbine, and Museum stations. Two of a class of older cars were used for backlot before being shipped by road to a scrapyard the day after filming ended, still disguised as New York cars.

The cars used for filming cannot operate singly, so a two-car set was used. A phony cab was built on the other end of H-1 car 5482 to simulate single car operation. The single car supposedly detached from the front of the train can be seen on several occasions to be part of a train of at least two cars. The most obvious cases are when rounding curves: once when first moving forward after being detached, and later when Anthony has just figured out the hijackers' plan.

=== Differences from the novel ===
Since the film was produced much later than the original, there are also additions to the film that did not exist in the original. For example, one of the characters sets up an IBM ThinkPad laptop computer, connected wirelessly to a motion detector that he places on the track. Later in the film, another character views the screen to see an approaching person, whom he confronts in the tunnel. The ransom demand in the remake was $5 million as opposed to $1 million in the original film and the novel.

== Home media ==
In 2012, TGG Direct released the film on DVD in full frame in a two-pack that also included Runaway Train (1985).
