= 28th Street station (IRT Lexington Avenue Line) =

New York City Subway station in Manhattan

28 Street
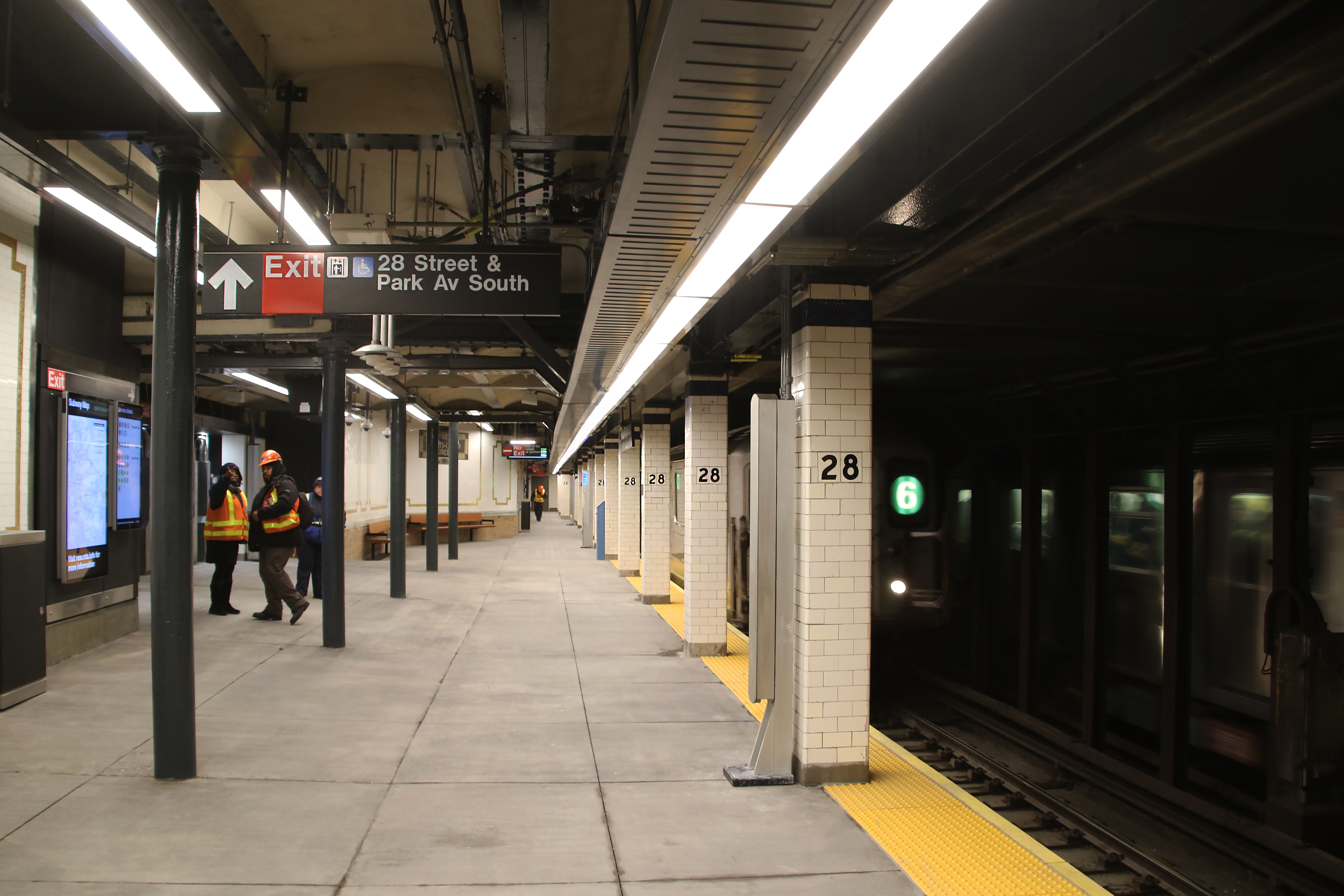
- R62A 6 train arriving at the downtown platform

Station statistics
- Address: East 28th Street & Park Avenue South; New York, New York
- Borough: Manhattan
- Locale: Rose Hill, Kips Bay
- Coordinates: 40.74329°N 73.984165°W
- Division: A (IRT)
- Line: IRT Lexington Avenue Line
- Services: 4 (late nights); 6 (all times) <6> (weekdays until 8:45 p.m., peak direction)
- Transit: NYCT Bus: M1, M2, M3, M101, M102, M103, SIM3, SIM6, SIM10, SIM11, SIM31, X37, X38, QM63, QM64, QM68; MTA Bus: BxM3, BxM4, BxM11, BxM18, BM2, BM3, BM4, QM21; Bee-Line Bus System: 0028
- Structure: Underground
- Platforms: 2 side platforms
- Tracks: 4

Other information
- Opened: October 27, 1904 (122 years ago)
- Closed: July 16, 2018; 8 years ago (reconstruction)
- Rebuilt: January 14, 2019; 7 years ago
- Accessible: Partially; full access planned (southbound platform accessible via elevator)

Traffic
- 2025: 4,767,390 ▲3.4%
- Rank: 63 out of 423
Services
Preceding station	New York City Subway	Following station
33rd Street 4 6 <6> toward Pelham Bay Park	Local	23rd Street–Baruch College 4 6 <6> toward Brooklyn Bridge–City Hall
does not stop here
Location
Location within New York City Subway
Location within New York City
Location within New York
Track layout
Street map
Station service legend
Symbol	Description
Stops all times	Stops all times
Stops late nights only	Stops late nights only
Stops rush hours in the peak direction only	Stops rush hours in the peak direction only
- 28th Street Subway Station (IRT)
- U.S. National Register of Historic Places
- New York State Register of Historic Places
- MPS: New York City Subway System MPS
- NRHP reference No.: 05000230
- NYSRHP No.: 06101.015031

Significant dates
- Added to NRHP: March 30, 2005
- Designated NYSRHP: May 11, 2005

The 28th Street station is a local station on the IRT Lexington Avenue Line of the New York City Subway. Located under Park Avenue South at 28th Street in the Rose Hill neighborhood of Manhattan, it is served by 6 trains at all times, <6> trains during weekdays in the peak direction, and 4 trains during late night hours.

The 28th Street station was constructed for the Interborough Rapid Transit Company (IRT) as part of the city's first subway line, which was approved in 1900. Construction of the line segment that includes the 28th Street station started on September 12 of the same year. The station opened on October 27, 1904, as one of the original 28 stations of the New York City Subway. The station's platforms were lengthened in the late 1940s.

The 28th Street station contains two side platforms and four tracks; express trains use the inner two tracks to bypass the station. The station was built with tile and mosaic decorations, which are continued along the platform extensions. The platforms contain exits to 28th Street and Park Avenue, as well as to the New York Life Building. The platforms are not connected to each other within fare control. The station is listed on the National Register of Historic Places.

== History ==
=== Construction and opening ===
Planning for a subway line in New York City dates to 1864. However, development of what would become the city's first subway line did not start until 1894, when the New York State Legislature passed the Rapid Transit Act. The subway plans were drawn up by a team of engineers led by William Barclay Parsons, the Rapid Transit Commission's chief engineer. It called for a subway line from New York City Hall in lower Manhattan to the Upper West Side, where two branches would lead north into the Bronx. A plan was formally adopted in 1897, and all legal conflicts over the route alignment were resolved near the end of 1899. The Rapid Transit Construction Company, organized by John B. McDonald and funded by August Belmont Jr., signed the initial Contract 1 with the Rapid Transit Commission in February 1900, in which it would construct the subway and maintain a 50-year operating lease from the opening of the line. In 1901, the firm of Heins & LaFarge was hired to design the underground stations. Belmont incorporated the Interborough Rapid Transit Company (IRT) in April 1902 to operate the subway.

The 28th Street station was constructed as part of the route segment from Great Jones Street to 41st Street. Construction on this section of the line began on September 12, 1900. The section from Great Jones Street to a point 100 feet (30 m) north of 33rd Street was awarded to Holbrook, Cabot & Daly Contracting Company, while the remaining section to 41st Street was done by Ira A. Shaker. By late 1903, the subway was nearly complete, but the IRT Powerhouse and the system's electrical substations were still under construction, delaying the system's opening. That December, workers installed the station's eight entrance and exit kiosks. The 28th Street station opened on October 27, 1904, as one of the original 28 stations of the New York City Subway from City Hall to 145th Street on the Broadway–Seventh Avenue Line.

=== Service changes and station renovations ===
==== 20th century ====
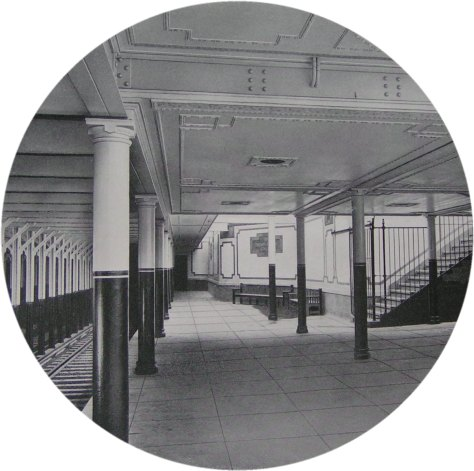
The 28th Street station in 1904

After the first subway line was completed in 1908, the station was served by local trains along both the West Side (now the Broadway–Seventh Avenue Line to Van Cortlandt Park–242nd Street) and East Side (now the Lenox Avenue Line). West Side local trains had their southern terminus at City Hall during rush hours and South Ferry at other times, and had their northern terminus at 242nd Street. East Side local trains ran from City Hall to Lenox Avenue (145th Street).

To address overcrowding, in 1909, the New York Public Service Commission proposed lengthening the platforms at stations along the original IRT subway. As part of a modification to the IRT's construction contracts made on January 18, 1910, the company was to lengthen station platforms to accommodate ten-car express and six-car local trains. In addition to $1.5 million (equivalent to $51.8 million in 2025) spent on platform lengthening, $500,000 (equivalent to $17.3 million in 2025) was spent on building additional entrances and exits. It was anticipated that these improvements would increase capacity by 25 percent. Platforms at local stations, such as the 28th Street station, were lengthened by between 20 and 30 feet (6.1 and 9.1 m). Both platforms were extended to the north and south. Six-car local trains began operating in October 1910. The Lexington Avenue Line opened north of Grand Central–42nd Street in 1918, and the original line was divided into an H-shaped system. All local trains were sent via the Lexington Avenue Line, running along the Pelham Line in the Bronx.

In December 1922, the Transit Commission approved a $3 million project to lengthen platforms at 14 local stations along the original IRT line, including 28th Street and seven other stations on the Lexington Avenue Line. Platform lengths at these stations would be increased from 225 to 436 feet (69 to 133 m). The commission postponed the platform-lengthening project in September 1923, at which point the cost had risen to $5.6 million.

On August 6, 1927, bombs exploded at the 28th Street station and at the 28th Street station on the Broadway Line. Numerous passengers were injured, but there were no casualties, although investigators initially believed one person may have been killed. The perpetrator of the bombings is unknown; they were initially blamed on Galleanists (as Sacco and Vanzetti had been denied appeal three days prior), though police later believed they were unrelated.

With the completion of the New York Life Building between 26th and 27th Streets in 1928, a new entrance opened from the building's basement to the southbound platform. The city government took over the IRT's operations on June 12, 1940. In January 1947, the New York City Board of Transportation awarded a $4.003 million contract for the lengthening of platforms at the 23rd Street–Baruch College, 28th Street, and 33rd Street stations. The preexisting passageway to the New York Life Building was converted to an extension of the southbound platform. The New York Life Company and the city shared the cost of converting the passageway into a platform. The platform extensions at all three stations opened on April 13, 1948, after which they could accommodate ten-car trains.

In 1987, the Metropolitan Transportation Authority (MTA) allocated $31 million to renovate 44 stations across the subway system, including the 28th Street station. The station's original tiles, which were peeling off, were entirely replaced. At the fare control area, glass block walls were installed above the turnstiles. New tiles were also installed on the floors and walls of the fare control areas. To deter fare evaders from sneaking through the emergency exit "slam gates" at each fare-control area, electronically activated gates were installed beside the existing turnstiles. The staircases to street level were rebuilt as well. The work was completed by early 1989, having been delayed by nine months because of setbacks in the delivery of new light fixtures.

==== 21st century ====
The 28th Street station has been listed on the National Register of Historic Places since 2005. During the mid-2010s, a staircase and elevator from street level to the southbound platform was added with the construction of 400 Park Avenue South, a residential tower at the southwestern corner of Park Avenue South and 28th Street. The tower was completed in 2015.

Under the 2015–2019 MTA Capital Plan, the station underwent a complete overhaul as part of the Enhanced Station Initiative, and was entirely closed for several months. Updates included cellular service, Wi-Fi, USB charging stations, interactive service advisories and maps. In January 2018, the NYCT and Bus Committee recommended that Judlau Contracting should receive the $125 million contract for the renovations of 57th and 23rd Streets on the IND Sixth Avenue Line, 28th Street on the IRT Lexington Avenue Line, and 34th Street–Penn Station on the IRT Broadway–Seventh Avenue Line and IND Eighth Avenue Line. However, the MTA Board temporarily deferred the vote for these packages after city representatives refused to vote to award the contracts. The contract was put back for a vote in February, where it was ultimately approved. The station was closed for renovations on July 16, 2018, and reopened to the public January 14, 2019, delayed from December 2018.

== Station layout ==
Like other local stations, 28th Street has four tracks and two side platforms. The 6 stops here at all times, rush-hour and midday <6> trains stop here in the peak direction, and the 4 stops here during late nights. The two express tracks are used by the 4 and 5 trains during daytime hours. The station is between 33rd Street to the north and 23rd Street–Baruch College to the south. The platforms were originally 200 feet (61 m) long, like at other local stations on the original IRT, but were later extended to 520 feet (160 m). The platform extensions are at both ends of the original platforms. The 28th Street station is partially wheelchair-accessible, with one elevator connecting the street and the southbound platform only. Fixed platform barriers, which are intended to prevent commuters falling to the tracks, are positioned near the platform edges.

The express tracks stay level, while the local tracks slowly incline into the station to allow for the easier deceleration of local trains. As such, the express tracks are at a slightly lower elevation than the local tracks.

=== Design ===
Design details

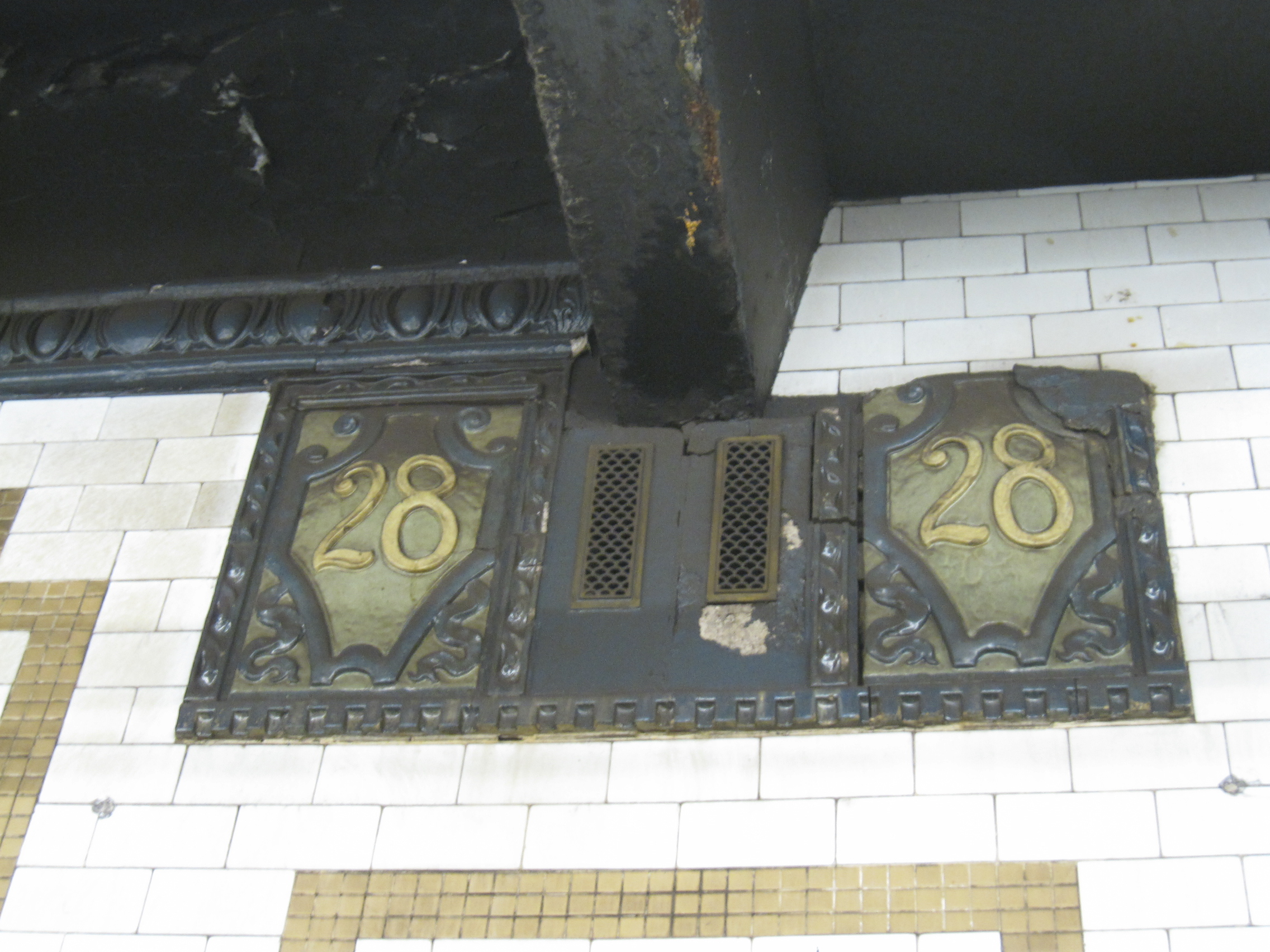
Faience plaque

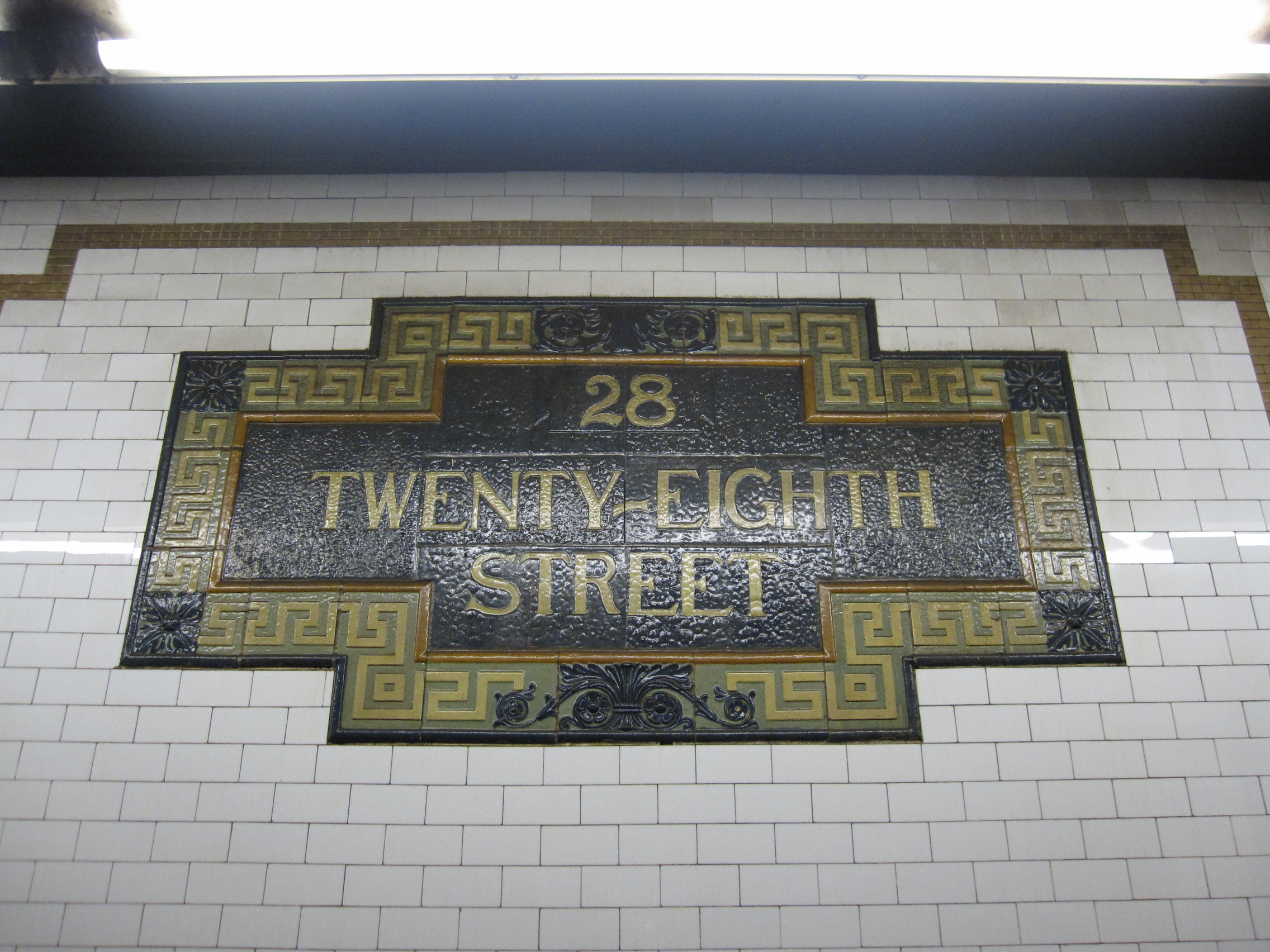
Faience name tablet

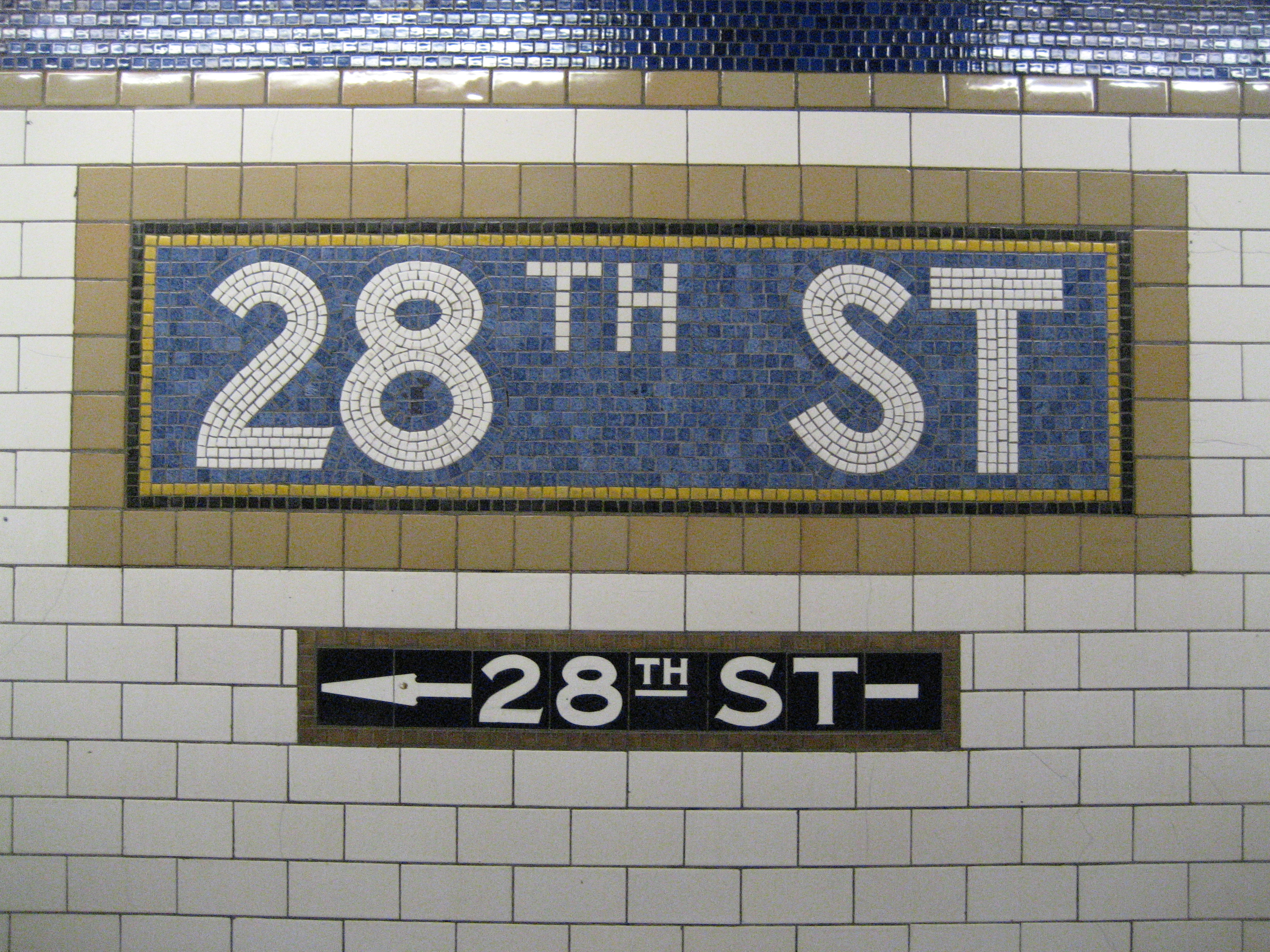
Mosaic name tablet

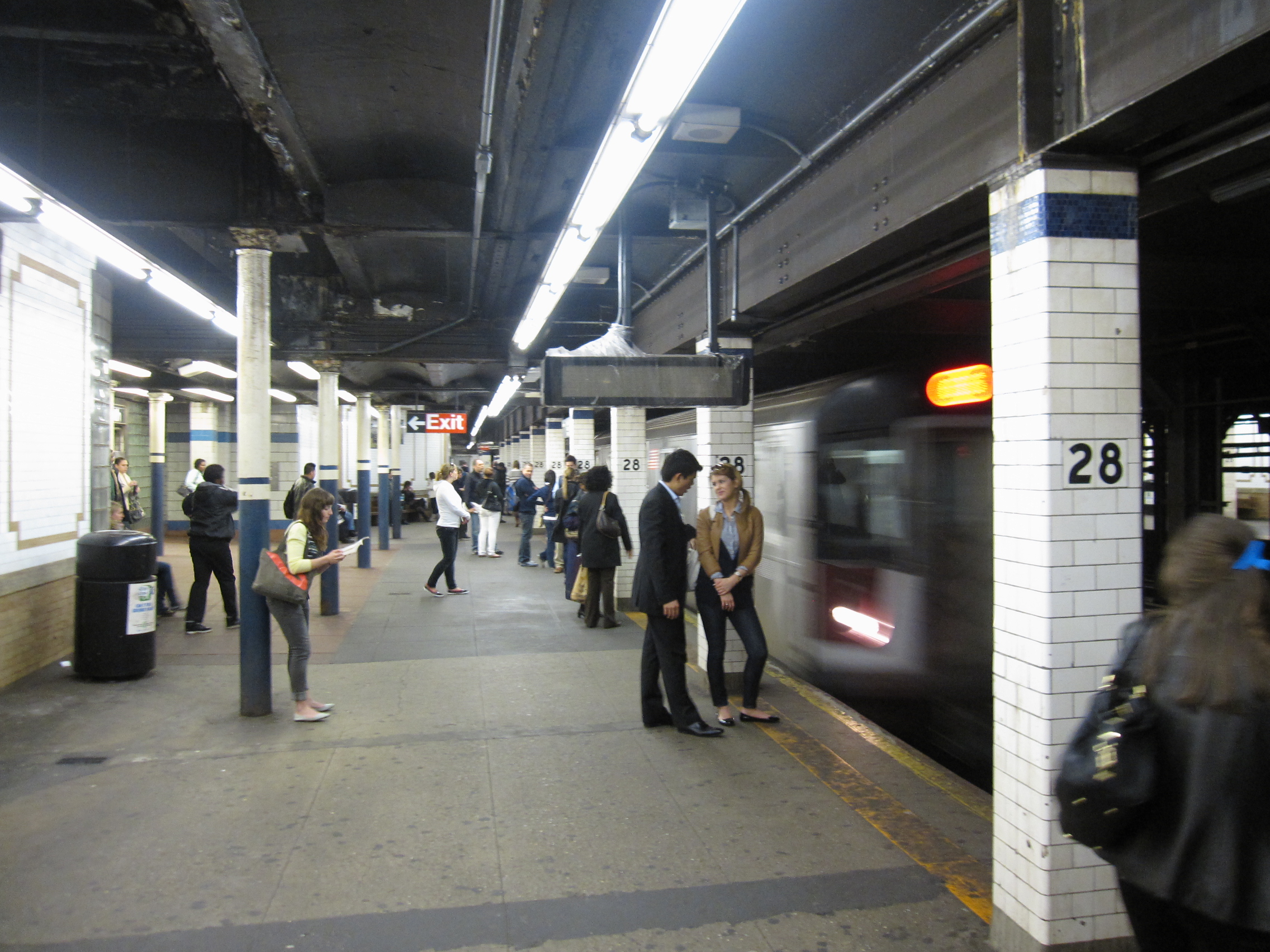
A southbound 6 train arriving prior to the station's 2019 renovation

As with other stations built as part of the original IRT, the station was constructed using a cut-and-cover method. The tunnel is covered by a U-shaped trough that contains utility pipes and wires. This trough contains a foundation of concrete no less than 4 inches (100 mm) thick. Each platform consists of 3-inch-thick (7.6 cm) concrete slabs, beneath which are drainage basins. The original platforms contain I-beam columns spaced every 15 feet (4.6 m), while the platform extensions contain columns with white glazed tiles. Additional columns between the tracks, spaced every 5 feet (1.5 m), support the jack-arched concrete station roofs. There is a 1-inch (25 mm) gap between the trough wall and the platform walls, which are made of 4-inch (100 mm)-thick brick covered over by a tiled finish.

The fare control is at platform level and there are no open crossunders or crossovers. There is a closed crossunder about halfway between each platform, which was constructed during the 1940s and is sealed. The walls along the platforms near the fare control areas consist of a brick wainscoting on the lowest part of the wall, with bronze air vents along the wainscoting, and white glass tiles above. The platform walls are divided at 15-foot (4.6 m) intervals by buff mosaic tile pilasters, or vertical bands. Atop the pilasters are pairs of cruciform faience plaques with the words 28 twenty-eighth street, surrounded by foliate designs and rosettes. The plaque pairings are set within a frame that contains a ventilation opening between each plaque of the pair. A cornice with blue egg-and-dart patterns runs atop these walls. The platform extensions are decorated with blue and buff tile bands, and contain blue mosaic tile plaques with the number "28" atop the pilasters. The far southern end of the southbound platform has square ceramic tiles topped by marble belt courses. The mosaic tiles at all original IRT stations were manufactured by the American Encaustic Tile Company, which subcontracted the installations at each station. The decorative work was performed by faience contractor Grueby Faience Company. The ceilings of the fare control areas once contained plaster molding, although this has been removed. The fare control areas at 28th Street contain various maintenance rooms and were retiled with large rectangular ceramic blocks in 1989. As of the 2019 renovation, the fare control areas have modern black finishes.

Two works of art have been installed in this station. The first was a glass block wall artwork at the main fare control by Gerald Marks, entitled Seven Waves 4 Twenty-Eight. It was installed during station renovations in 1996. Seven Waves 4 Twenty-Eight was replaced by Roaming Underfoot, a glass mosaic mural on the platform walls by Nancy Blum. Roaming Underfoot showcases flora in the Madison Square Park Conservancy's Perennial Collection and was installed during the 2018 renovation.

=== Exits ===
Each platform has exits to 28th Street; the northbound platform's exits are on the eastern side of Park Avenue South while the southbound platform's exits are on the western side. The only control area for the northbound platform is at the northern end of the station, at 28th Street and Park Avenue South, where four stairs lead to street level, two each to the northeastern and southeastern corners. These stairs contain simple, modern steel railings like those seen at most New York City Subway stations. These stairs also contain next-train countdown clocks and neighborhood wayfinding maps at the exterior of each entrance, which were installed in the 2019 renovation.

The main fare control area for the southbound platform is also at the northern end of the station. A stair leads up to 45 East 28th Street on the north side of that street, and a stair and elevator lead up to 50 East 28th Street directly across to the south. The latter entrance replaced two staircases right outside the building, at the southwestern corner of 28th Street and Park Avenue South.

A second fare control area at the southern end of the southbound platform leads to a privately operated passageway in the basement of the New York Life Building, between 26th and 27th Streets. It is only open from 7 a.m. to 7 p.m. on weekdays. The New York Life Building entrance has an Art Deco inspired interborough subway sign hanging from the facade of that building.

Exits from the 28th Street station

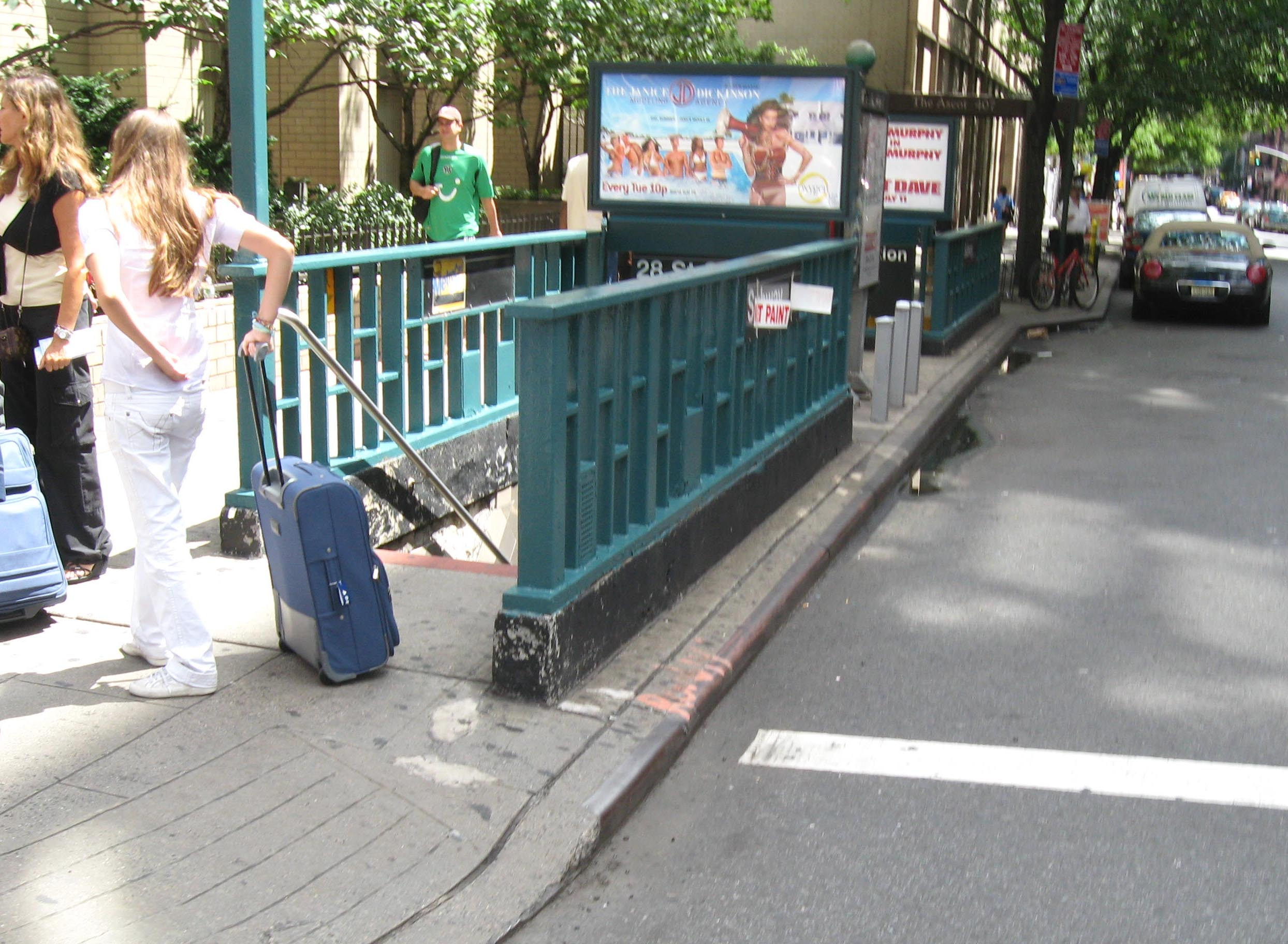
Northbound street stair

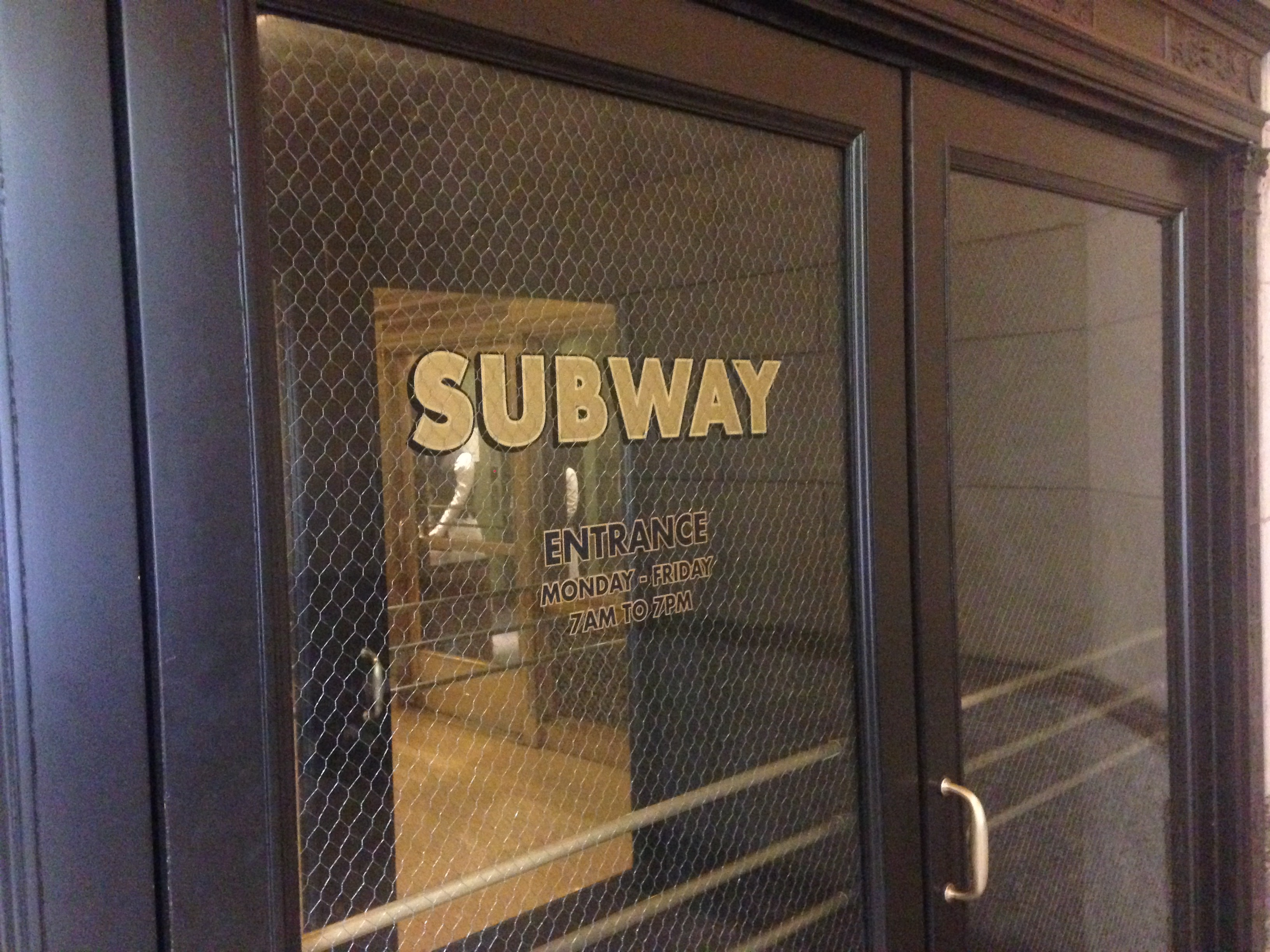
Downtown entrance within the New York Life Building

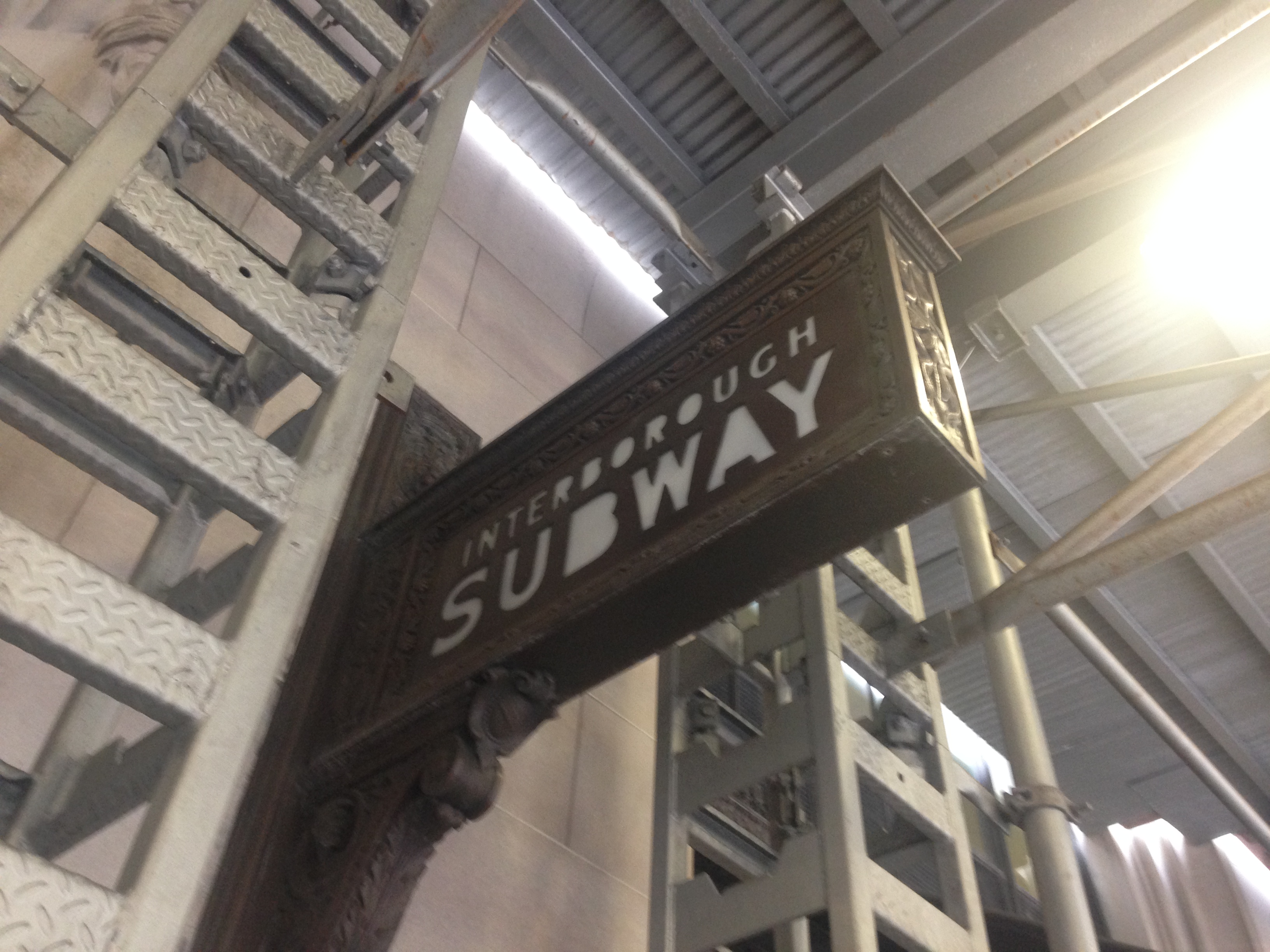
"Interborough Subway" sign outside the New York Life Building

== See also ==
- National Register of Historic Places listings in Manhattan from 14th to 59th Streets
