= 33rd Street station (IRT Lexington Avenue Line) =

New York City Subway station in Manhattan

33 Street
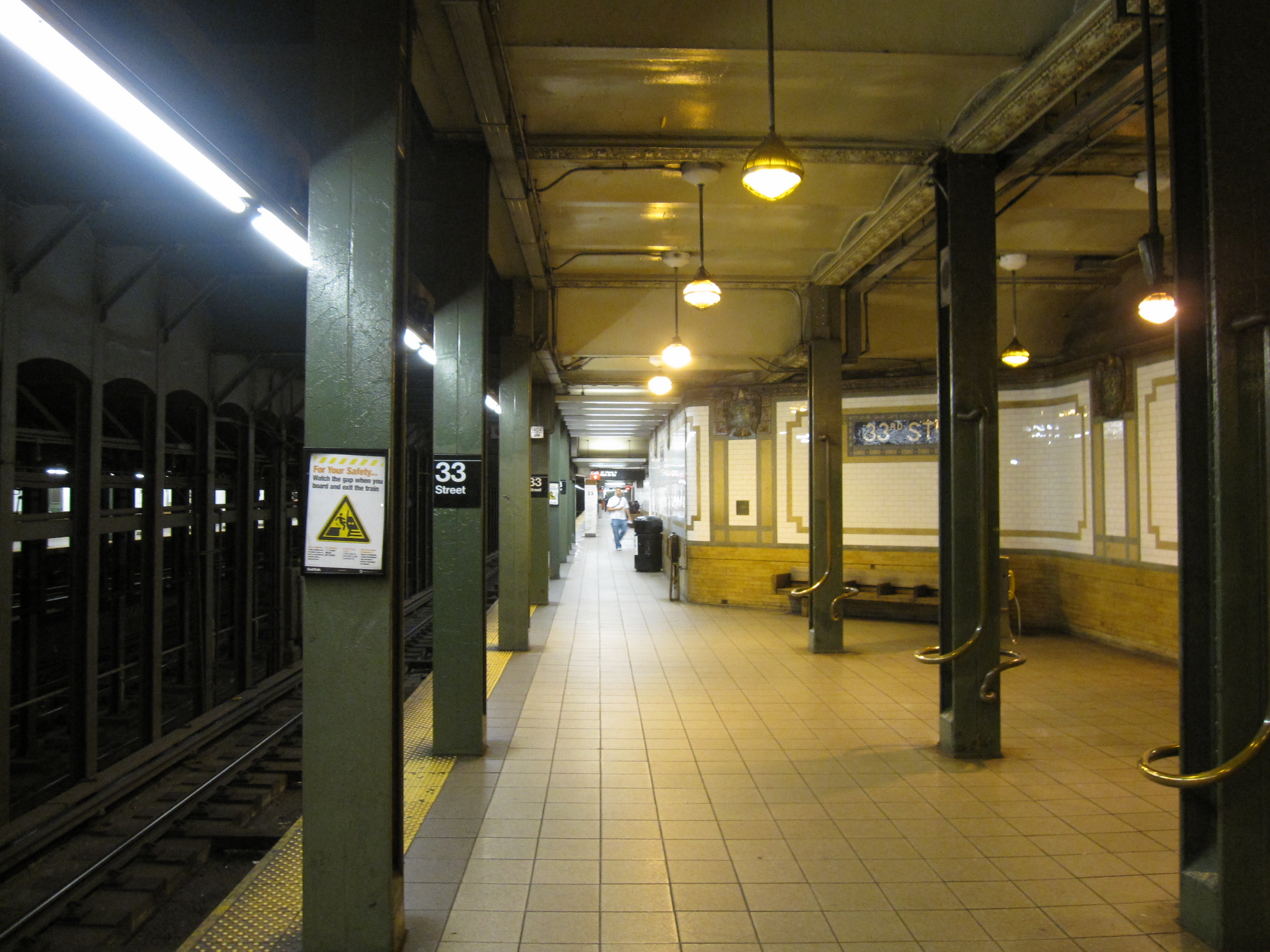
- Downtown platform with an Arts for Transit artwork, Lariat Seat Loops, on the columns

Station statistics
- Address: East 33rd Street & Park Avenue; New York, New York
- Borough: Manhattan
- Locale: Murray Hill, Kips Bay
- Coordinates: 40°44′47″N 73°58′55″W
- Division: A (IRT)
- Line: IRT Lexington Avenue Line
- Services: 4 (late nights); 6 (all times) <6> (weekdays until 8:45 p.m., peak direction)
- Transit: NYCT Bus: M34 SBS, M34A SBS, M101, M102, M103; MTA Bus: BxM1, BxM3, BxM4, BxM11, BxM18, BM5, QM12, QM15, QM16, QM17, QM18, QM24; NYC Ferry: Astoria and Soundview Routes (on FDR Drive and East 34th Street)
- Structure: Underground
- Platforms: 2 side platforms
- Tracks: 4

Other information
- Opened: October 27, 1904 (122 years ago)

Traffic
- 2025: 6,421,732 ▲4.5%
- Rank: 38 out of 423
Services
Preceding station	New York City Subway	Following station
Grand Central–42nd Street 4 6 <6> toward Pelham Bay Park	Local	28th Street 4 6 <6> toward Brooklyn Bridge–City Hall
does not stop here
Non-revenue services and lines
Preceding station	New York City Subway	Following station
Grand Central shuttle	no service	
Location
Location within New York City Subway
Location within New York City
Location within New York
Track layout
Street map
Station service legend
Symbol	Description
Stops all times	Stops all times
Stops late nights only	Stops late nights only
Stops rush hours in the peak direction only	Stops rush hours in the peak direction only
- 33rd Street Subway Station (IRT)
- U.S. National Register of Historic Places
- New York State Register of Historic Places
- New York City Landmark
- MPS: New York City Subway System MPS
- NRHP reference No.: 04001014
- NYSRHP No.: 06101.015010
- NYCL No.: 1096

Significant dates
- Added to NRHP: September 17, 2004
- Designated NYSRHP: July 20, 2004
- Designated NYCL: October 23, 1979

The 33rd Street station is a local station on the IRT Lexington Avenue Line of the New York City Subway. Located at the intersection of Park Avenue and 33rd Street in the Murray Hill neighborhood of Manhattan, it is served by 6 trains at all times, <6> trains during weekdays in the peak direction, and 4 trains during late night hours.

The 33rd Street station was constructed for the Interborough Rapid Transit Company (IRT) as part of the city's first subway line, which was approved in 1900. Construction of the line segment that includes the 33rd Street station started on September 12 of the same year. The station opened on October 27, 1904, as one of the original 28 stations of the New York City Subway. After the city's first subway line was split into multiple lines in 1918, there was a failed proposal in the 1920s to convert 33rd Street into an express station. The station's platforms were lengthened in the late 1940s.

The 33rd Street station contains two side platforms and four tracks; express trains use the inner two tracks to bypass the station. The station was built with tile and mosaic decorations, which are continued along the platform extensions. The platforms contain exits to 32nd Street to the south and 33rd Street to the north. The platforms are not connected to each other within fare control. The original station interior is a New York City designated landmark and listed on the National Register of Historic Places.

== History ==
=== Construction and opening ===
Planning for a subway line in New York City dates to 1864. However, development of what would become the city's first subway line did not start until 1894, when the New York State Legislature passed the Rapid Transit Act. The subway plans were drawn up by a team of engineers led by William Barclay Parsons, the Rapid Transit Commission's chief engineer. It called for a subway line from New York City Hall in lower Manhattan to the Upper West Side, where two branches would lead north into the Bronx. A plan was formally adopted in 1897, and all legal conflicts over the route alignment were resolved near the end of 1899. The Rapid Transit Construction Company, organized by John B. McDonald and funded by August Belmont Jr., signed the initial Contract 1 with the Rapid Transit Commission in February 1900, in which it would construct the subway and maintain a 50-year operating lease from the opening of the line. In 1901, the firm of Heins & LaFarge was hired to design the underground stations. Belmont incorporated the Interborough Rapid Transit Company (IRT) in April 1902 to operate the subway.

The 33rd Street station was constructed as part of the route segment from Great Jones Street to 41st Street. Construction on this section of the line began on September 12, 1900. The section from Great Jones Street to a point 100 feet (30 m) north of 33rd Street was awarded to Holbrook, Cabot & Daly Contracting Company, while the remaining section to 41st Street was done by Ira A. Shaler. The section between 33rd and 41st Streets was built as two double-track tunnels. To accommodate a never-built connection to the mainline platforms at Grand Central Terminal, the tunnel carrying northbound trains was shifted eastward (nearly touching the eastern curb line of Park Avenue). At the time, the railroads that operated the terminal had not agreed to the connection. Property owners did not learn about the change until a series of accidents occurred along the excavation site in 1902. A dynamite explosion near Park Avenue and 41st Street on January 27, 1902, killed five people, and several mansions on Park Avenue fell into the excavation site that March due to rockslides. Shaler became known by the pejorative nickname of "hoodoo contractor" as a result. After Shaler was killed by a rockslide in his own excavation site on June 17, 1902, his estate completed the construction of the tunnel between 33rd and 41st Street.

By late 1903, the subway was nearly complete, but the IRT Powerhouse and the system's electrical substations were still under construction, delaying the system's opening. The 33rd Street station opened on October 27, 1904, as one of the original 28 stations of the New York City Subway from City Hall to 145th Street on the Broadway–Seventh Avenue Line. Litigation over the IRT's Murray Hill tunnels continued for several years; in 1905, a judge found that the city government was responsible for the January 1902 explosion. In spite of this, the northbound tunnel was never relocated, as it had already been completed.

=== Service changes and station renovations ===
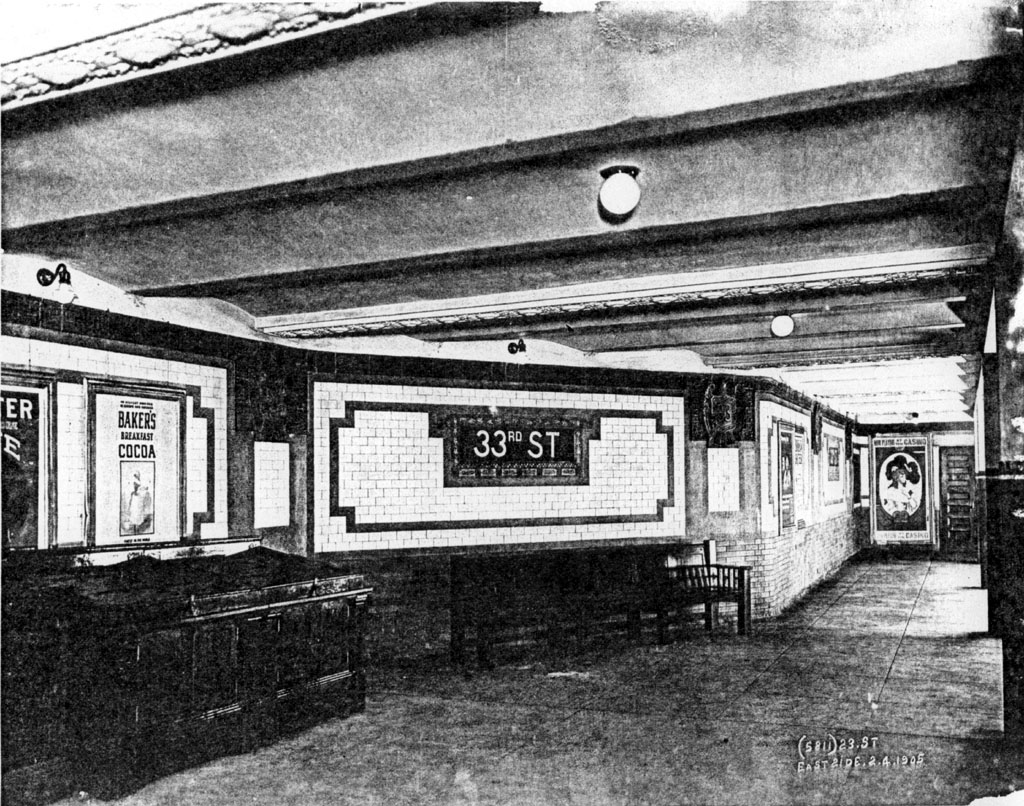
33rd Street station in 1905

After the first subway line was completed in 1908, the station was served by local trains along both the West Side (now the Broadway–Seventh Avenue Line to Van Cortlandt Park–242nd Street) and East Side (now the Lenox Avenue Line). West Side local trains had their southern terminus at City Hall during rush hours and South Ferry at other times, and had their northern terminus at 242nd Street. East Side local trains ran from City Hall to Lenox Avenue (145th Street).

To address overcrowding, in 1909, the New York Public Service Commission proposed lengthening the platforms at stations along the original IRT subway. As part of a modification to the IRT's construction contracts made on January 18, 1910, the company was to lengthen station platforms to accommodate ten-car express and six-car local trains. In addition to $1.5 million (equivalent to $51.8 million in 2025) spent on platform lengthening, $500,000 (equivalent to $17.3 million in 2025) was spent on building additional entrances and exits. It was anticipated that these improvements would increase capacity by 25 percent. Both platforms at the 33rd Street station was extended 27 feet (8.2 m) to the south. New "electric manholes", passageways leading to the equipment closets, were built at the southern ends of the platforms. Six-car local trains began operating in October 1910. The Lexington Avenue Line opened north of Grand Central–42nd Street in 1918, and the original line was divided into an H-shaped system. All local trains were sent via the Lexington Avenue Line, running along the Pelham Line in the Bronx.

In December 1922, the Transit Commission approved a proposal to convert the 33rd Street station into an express stop. It was estimated that the extra time spent by express trains at 33rd Street would be offset by the reduced dwell times at Grand Central. Local business owners supported the proposal, but the IRT opposed the plan, which would cost the company $750,000. In October 1923, the plan was postponed for a year due to a lack of funds. The Fifth Avenue Association requested in January 1924 that the Transit Commission again consider converting the 33rd Street station into an express stop, citing the fact that a 35-story structure was to be built immediately adjacent to the station. The express-stop proposal was postponed indefinitely in 1925. The Fifth Avenue Association requested in 1929 that the express-station proposal be reconsidered. The association said the conversion would "complete a quadrilateral of express stops" that included 34th Street–Penn Station, Times Square–42nd Street, and Grand Central–42nd Street.

In 1928, to alleviate overcrowding on the Lexington Avenue Line, a consulting engineer for the New York State Transit Commission proposed the construction of "reservoir" stations at 33rd/34th and 42nd Streets. The proposal entailed constructing a northbound-only tunnel under Lexington Avenue from 30th to 42nd Street, with stations at 34th and 42nd Streets, then converting the IRT tunnel under Park Avenue and the existing 33rd and 42nd Street stations to southbound-only use. The northbound and southbound stations at 33rd/34th and 42nd Streets would both have had two express tracks and one local track; the express tracks in either direction would have merged with each other north of 42nd Street and south of 30th Street. Although the "reservoir" plan was technically feasible, the $25 million projected cost was too high.

The city government took over the IRT's operations on June 12, 1940. In January 1947, the New York City Board of Transportation awarded a $4.003 million contract for the lengthening of platforms at the 23rd Street–Baruch College, 28th Street, and 33rd Street stations. The platform extensions at all three stations opened on April 13, 1948, after which they could accommodate ten-car trains. On December 27, 1948, a new entrance to the station at 32nd Street opened for use.

In 1979, the New York City Landmarks Preservation Commission designated the space within the boundaries of the original station, excluding expansions made after 1904, as a city landmark. The station was designated along with eleven others on the original IRT. The original interiors were listed on the National Register of Historic Places in 2004.

== Station layout ==
Like other local stations, 33rd Street has four tracks and two side platforms. The 6 stops here at all times, rush-hour and midday <6> trains stop here in the peak direction; and the 4 stops here during late nights. The two express tracks are used by the 4 and 5 trains during daytime hours. The station is between Grand Central–42nd Street to the north and 28th Street to the south. The platforms were originally 200 feet (61 m) long, like at other local stations on the original IRT, but later became 520 feet (160 m) long. The platform extensions are at the southern ends of the original platforms. Fixed platform barriers, which are intended to prevent commuters falling to the tracks, are positioned near the platform edges.

The express tracks stay level, while the local tracks slowly incline from south to north to allow for the easier deceleration of local trains. This results in a layout where the express tracks are at a lower elevation than the local tracks in the northern half of the station. North of the station, the two pairs of tracks in each direction separate into different tunnels because of the presence of the Murray Hill Tunnel, which runs under the center of this section of Park Avenue. As built, the tunnels were supposed to have been 17 feet (5.2 m) apart, but the northbound tunnel (to the east) was shifted eastward by another 21 feet (6.4 m) to accommodate a three-track connection from the original IRT subway north to the mainline Grand Central Terminal. There is a drainage pipe connecting the two tunnels between 37th and 38th Streets, as well as a cross-passage between 38th and 39th Streets.

The main entrance to the downtown platform on Park Avenue between 33rd and 34th Streets

=== Design ===
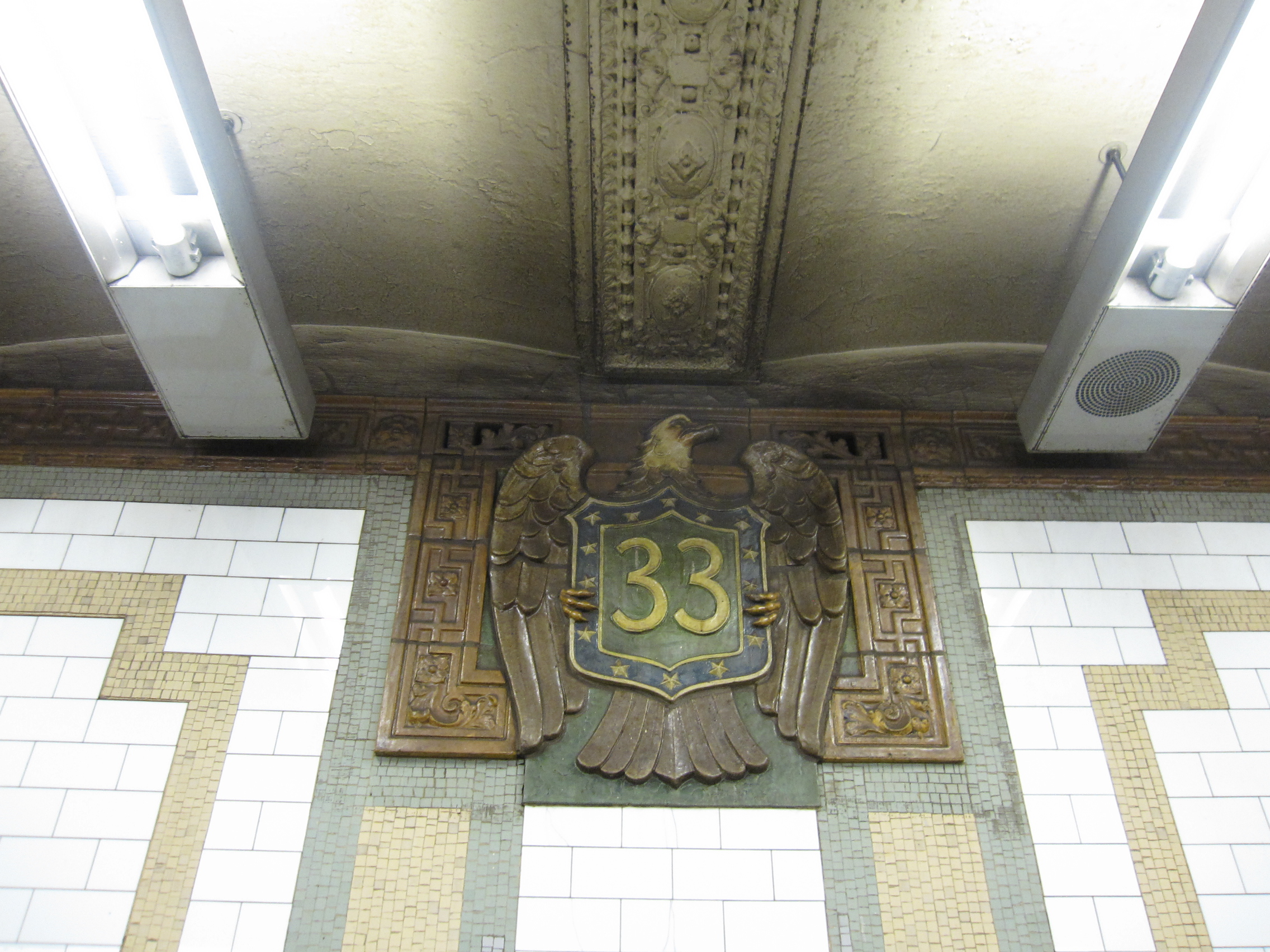
Faience plaque with eagle

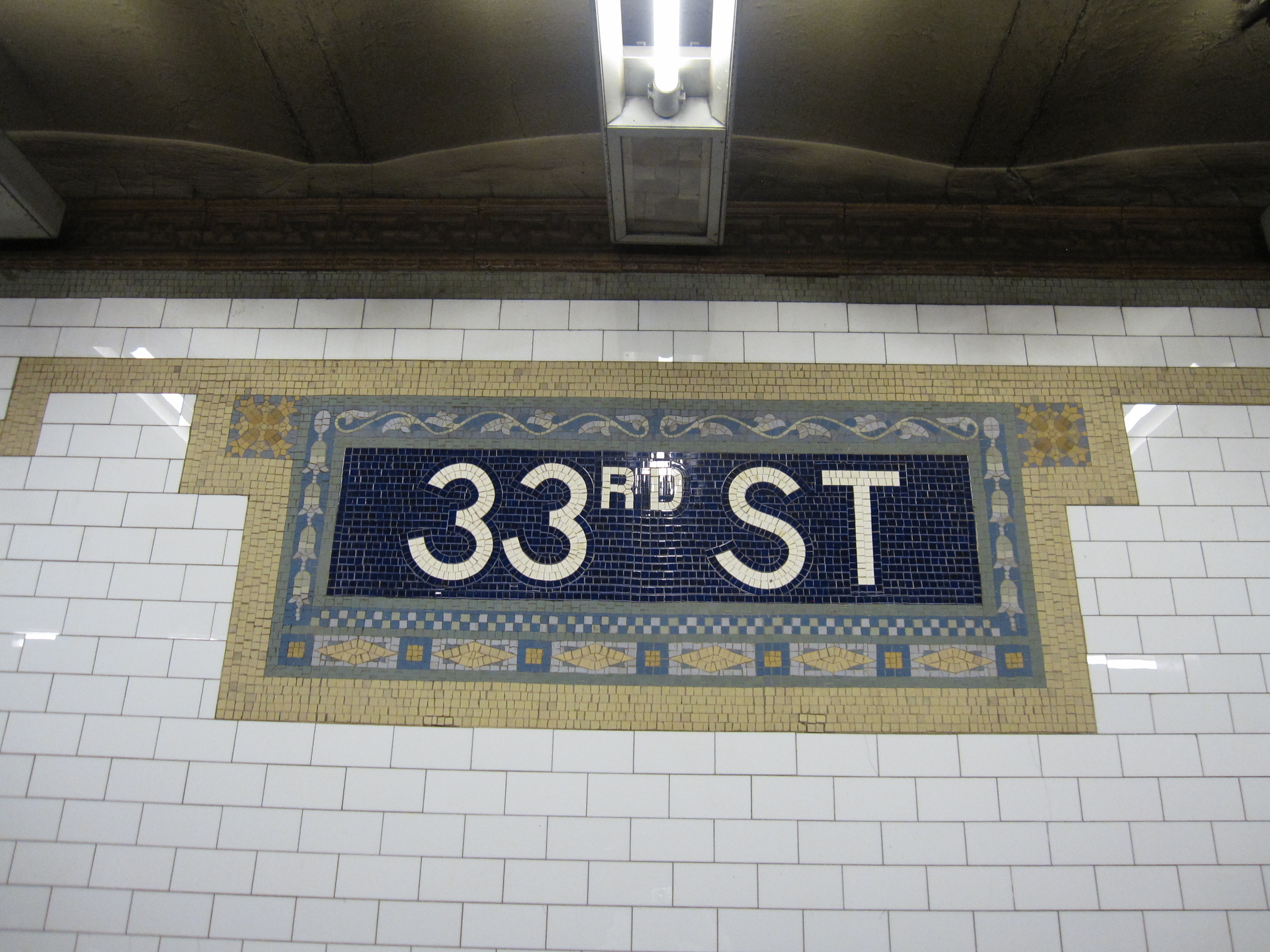
Mosaic name tablet

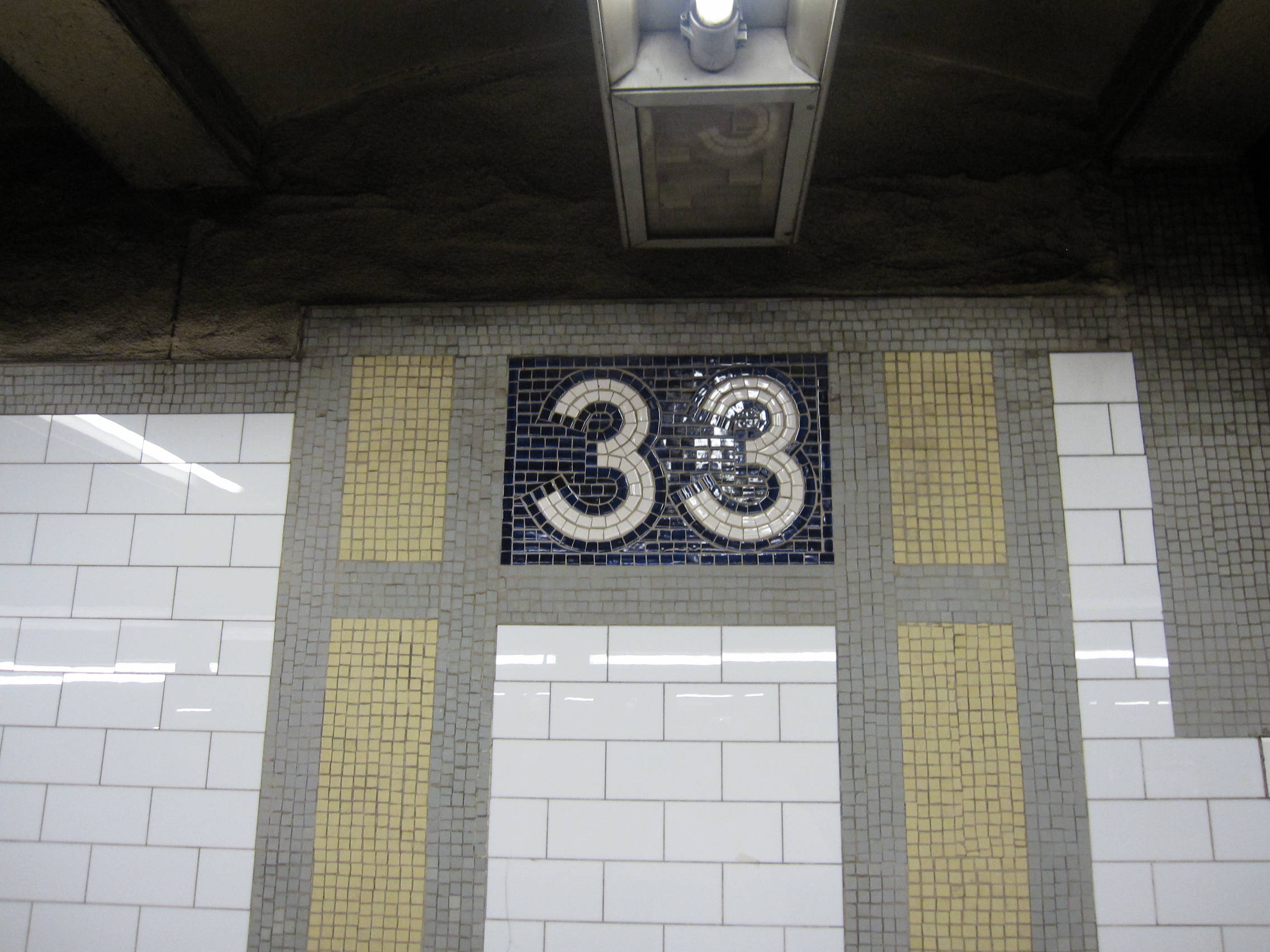
Mosaic with number "33"

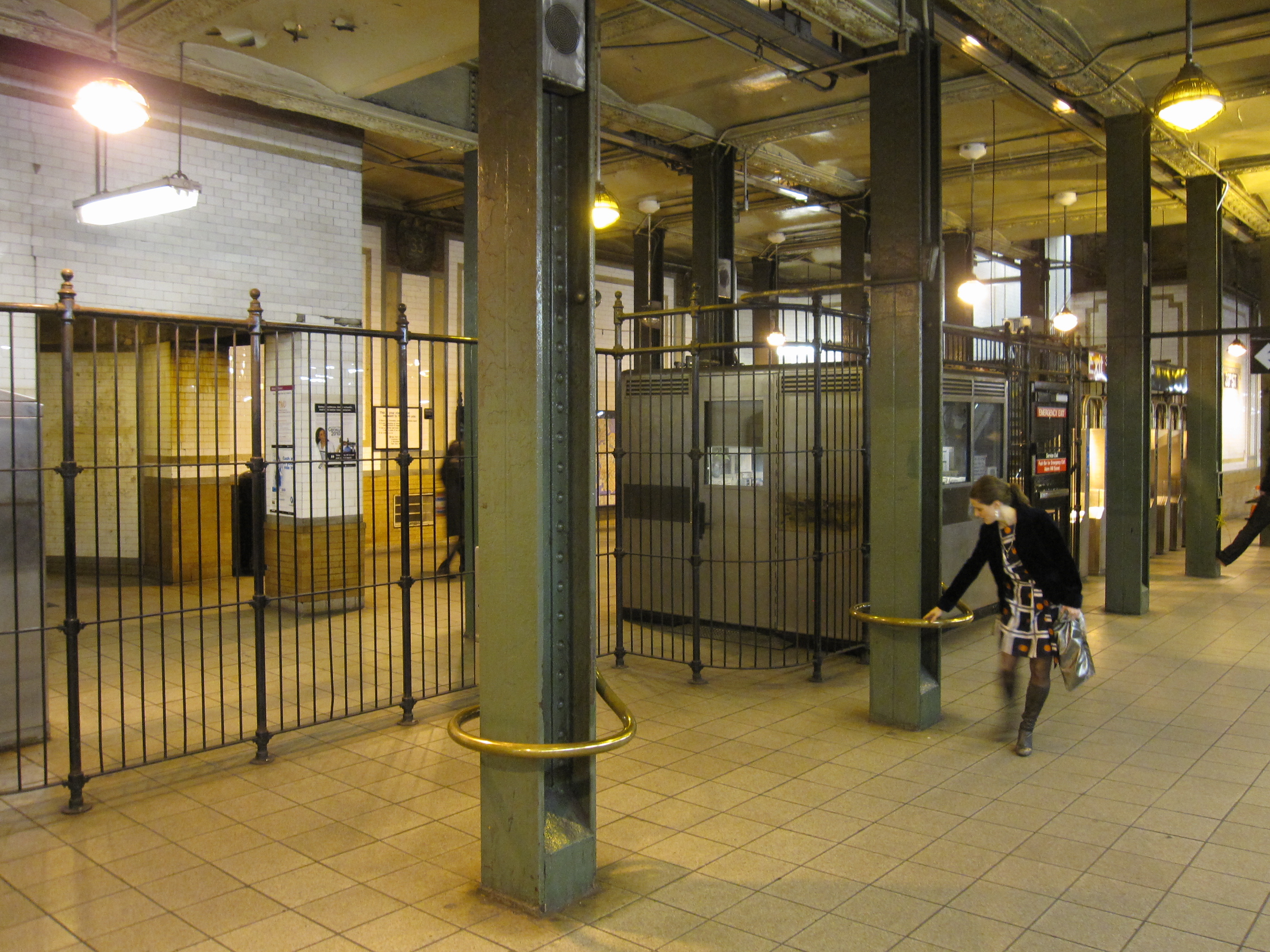
Lariat Seat Loops, the Art for Transit installation on the columns

As with other stations built as part of the original IRT, the station was constructed using a cut-and-cover method. The tunnel is covered by a U-shaped trough that contains utility pipes and wires. This trough contains a foundation of concrete no less than 4 inches (100 mm) thick. Each platform consists of 3-inch-thick (7.6 cm) concrete slabs, beneath which are drainage basins. The original platforms contain I-beam columns spaced every 15 feet (4.6 m), while the platform extensions contain columns with white glazed tiles. Additional columns between the tracks, spaced every 5 feet (1.5 m), support the jack-arched concrete station roofs. The ceiling height varies, being about 15 feet (4.6 m) above platform level near the northern fare control areas, and lower in other portions of the station. There is a 1-inch (25 mm) gap between the trough wall and the platform walls, which are made of 4-inch (100 mm)-thick brick covered over by a tiled finish.

The fare control areas are at platform level, and there is no crossover or crossunder between the platforms. The walls along the platforms near the fare control areas consist of a brick wainscoting on the lowest part of the wall, with bronze air vents along the wainscoting, and white glass tiles above. The platform walls are divided at 15-foot (4.6 m) intervals by buff and green mosaic tile pilasters, or vertical bands. In the original portion of the station, each pilaster is topped by green faience plaques depicting eagles, an allusion to the former 71st Regiment Armory at Park Avenue and 33rd Street; the eagles hold blue and white shields containing the number "33". A cornice with yellow and brown vine and fretwork patterns runs atop these walls. The platform extensions contain tiles with the number "33" atop the pilasters. Mosaic plaques with the words "33rd St." are also spaced at various intervals on the walls. The mosaic tiles at all original IRT stations were manufactured by the American Encaustic Tile Company, which subcontracted the installations at each station. The decorative work was performed by tile contractor John H. Parry and faience contractor Grueby Faience Company. The ceilings of the northern fare control areas contain plaster molding.

The 1997 artwork at this station is Lariat Seat Loops by James Garvey. These are composed of fourteen bronze loops surrounding the I-beam columns near the northern fare control areas, which are designed as handholds or seat rests.

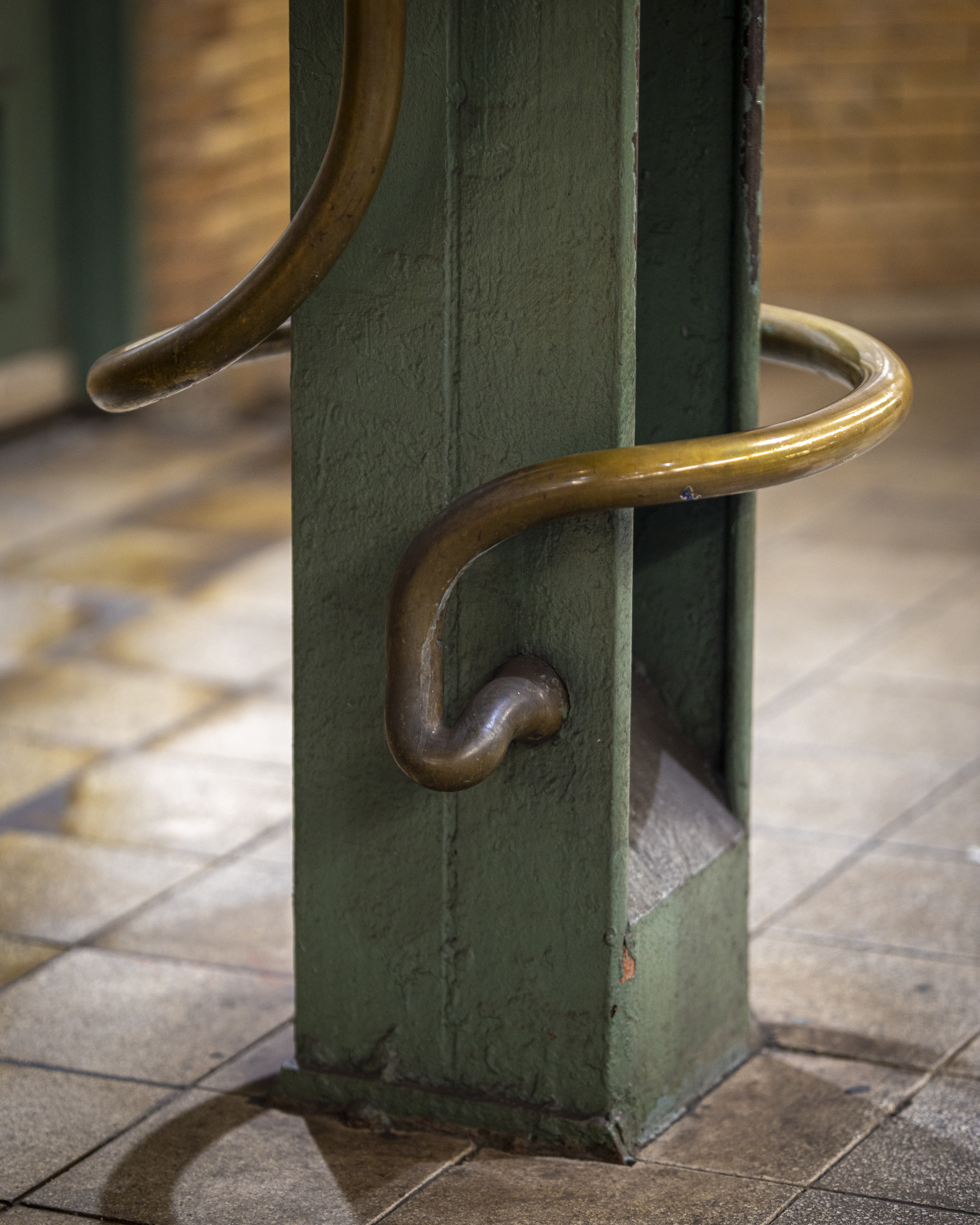
A single Lariat Seat Loop

According to Garvey, "the thick bronze bar ... resembles the lasso demonstration in a Will Rogers film clip". Garvey subsequently designed Lariat Tapers, a similar artwork at the Wall Street station, in 2011.

33rd St to 34th St subway cross-section
11th Av	10th & 9th Avs are skipped	Farley Building & Moynihan Train Hall	8th Av	Madison Square; Garden	7th Av	Storefronts	6th Av & Broadway		5th & Madison Avs are skipped	Park Av
mezzanine	10th & 9th Avs are skipped	train hall	A/C/E	concourse	1/2/3	Former Gimbel's passageway	mezz	PATH	5th & Madison Avs are skipped	6/<6>
mezzanine	10th & 9th Avs are skipped	conc	mezzanine	concourse	mezzanine		N/Q/R/W		5th & Madison Avs are skipped
7/<7>	10th & 9th Avs are skipped	Penn Station (platform level)					B/D/F/<F>/M		5th & Madison Avs are skipped

=== Exits ===
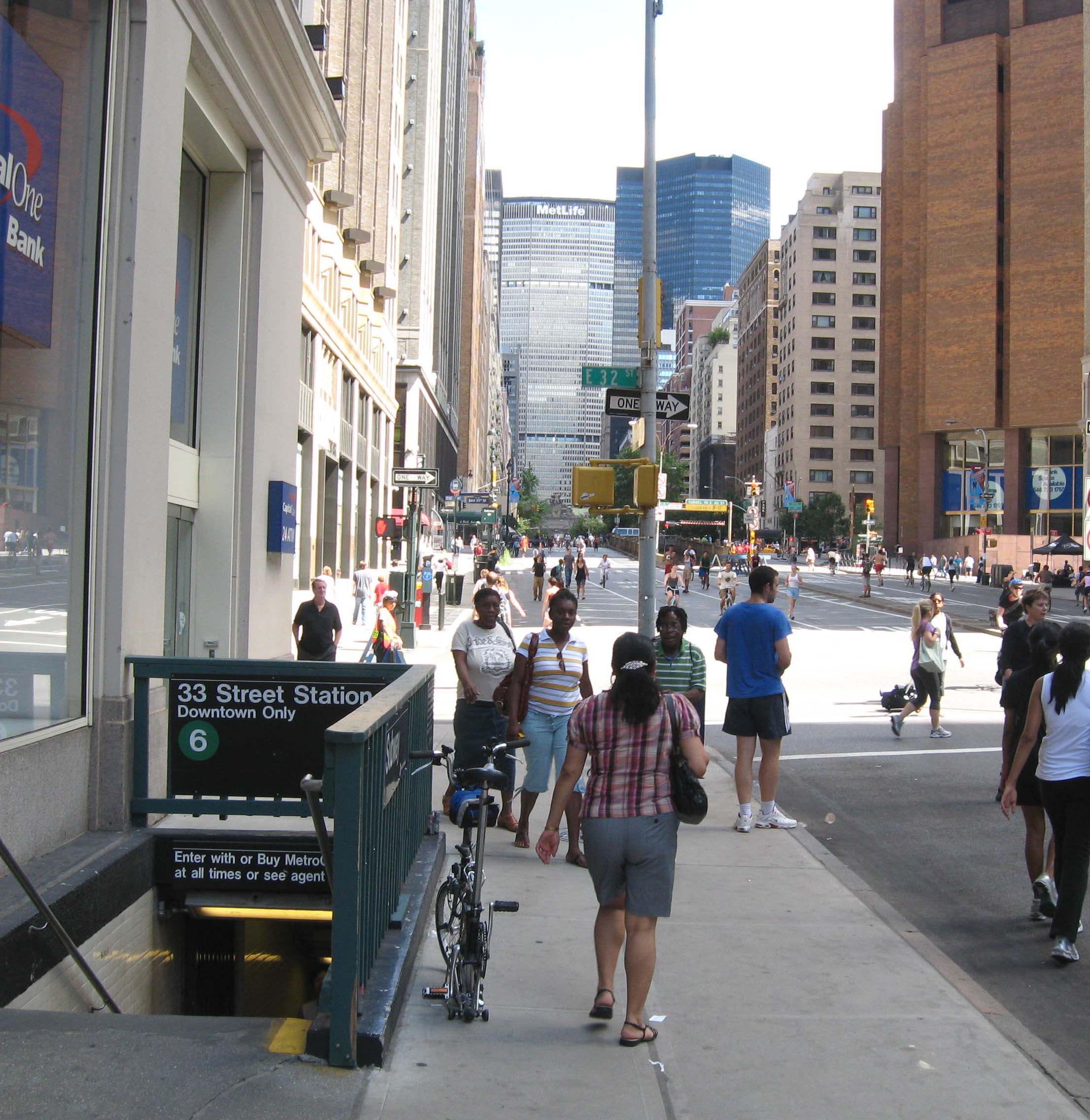
Southbound street stairs

Each platform has exits to both 32nd and 33rd Streets. The northbound platform's exits are on the eastern side of Park Avenue while the southbound platform's exits are on the western side. The street staircases contain relatively simple, modern steel railings like those seen at most New York City Subway stations.

At 33rd Street, each control area contains two exits, one each to the north and south sides of 33rd Street. These exits are directly outside 4 Park Avenue to the northwest, 2 Park Avenue to the southwest, 3 Park Avenue to the northeast, and 1 Park Avenue to the southeast. At 32nd Street, each control area contains two exits to the south side of that street.

== See also ==
- List of New York City Designated Landmarks in Manhattan from 14th to 59th Streets
- National Register of Historic Places listings in Manhattan from 14th to 59th Streets
