= 1998 Seattle Seahawks season =

American football team season

- Owner: Paul Allen
- Head coach: Dennis Erickson
- Home stadium: Kingdome

Results
- Record: 8–8
- Division place: 3rd AFC West
- Playoffs: Did not qualify
- All-Pros: DE Michael Sinclair (2nd team); LB Chad Brown (1st team)
- Pro Bowlers: DE Michael Sinclair; DT Cortez Kennedy; LB Chad Brown; CB Shawn Springs

The 1998 Seattle Seahawks season was the franchise's 23rd season in the National Football League (NFL), the 23rd playing their home games at the Kingdome, and the fourth and final under head coach head coach Dennis Erickson. They matched their 8–8 record from 1997, but a late-season loss to the New York Jets came due to a controversial call when Jets quarterback Vinny Testaverde ran in a touchdown but was downed short of the goal line yet the play was ruled a touchdown; the loss helped knock Seattle to 6–7. They won the next two games but a loss to the Denver Broncos in the final week saw them finish 8–8 and out of the playoffs for the tenth consecutive season.

== Offseason ==
=== NFL draft ===
1998 Seattle Seahawks draft
Round	Pick	Player	Position	College	Notes
1	15	Anthony Simmons	Linebacker	Clemson	
2	47	Todd Weiner	Offensive tackle	Kansas State	
3	76	Ahman Green *	Running back	Nebraska	
4	108	DeShone Myles	Linebacker	Nevada	
6	162	Carl Hansen	Defensive tackle	Stanford	(from Dallas)
6	169	Bobby Shaw	Wide receiver	California	
7	197	Jason McEndoo	Center	Washington State	
Made roster † Pro Football Hall of Fame * Made at least one Pro Bowl during career

=== Undrafted free agents ===
1998 undrafted free agents of note
Player	Position	College
Brian Finneran	Wide receiver	Villanova
Vershan Jackson	Fullback	Nebraska
Stanley Jackson	Wide receiver	Ohio State
Dirk Johnson	Punter	Northern Colorado
Paul Spicer	Defensive end	Saginaw Valley State
Jason Sadler	Offensive Tackle	Nevada

== Personnel ==
=== Staff ===
1998 Seattle Seahawks staff
**Front office**: Chairman – Paul Allen; President – Bob Whitsitt; Vice president of football operations – Randy Mueller; Assistant football operations director – Rick Thompson; College scouting director – Pat Mondock; Pro scouting director – Bill Quinter; **Head coaches**: Head coach – Dennis Erickson; **Offensive coaches**: Offensive coordinator – Bob Bratkowski; Quarterbacks – Rich Olson; Running backs – Tim Lappano; Wide receivers – Milt Jackson; Tight ends – Keith Gilbertson; Offensive line – Gregg Smith; Assistant offensive line – Bill Meyers; Offensive quality control – Eric Yarber	**Defensive coaches**: Defensive coordinator – Greg McMackin; Defensive line – Tommy Brasher; Linebackers – Jim Johnson; Defensive backs – Willy Robinson; Defensive – Dave Brown; **Special teams coaches**: Assistant head coach/special teams – Pete Rodriguez; **Strength and conditioning**: Strength and conditioning – Dana LeDuc; Assistant strength and conditioning – Darren Krein

=== Final roster ===
1998 Seattle Seahawks roster
**Quarterbacks (QB)**: 17 John Friesz; 7 Jon Kitna; 1 Warren Moon; **Running backs (RB)**: 31 Steve Broussard; 34 Reggie Brown; 30 Ahman Green; 38 Mack Strong; 32 Ricky Watters; **Wide receivers (WR)**: 89 Brian Blades; 84 Joey Galloway; 82 James McKnight; 85 Mike Pritchard; 83 Robert Wilson; **Tight ends (TE)**: 87 Carlester Crumpler; 86 Christian Fauria; 88 Deems May	**Offensive linemen (OL)**: 75 Howard Ballard T; 72 Tony Berti T; 60 Greg Bloedorn C; 62 Chris Gray C; 68 Brian Habib G; 71 Walter Jones T; 66 Pete Kendall G; 52 Jason McEndoo C; 74 Todd Weiner G; 79 Grant Williams T; **Defensive linemen (DL)**: 98 Sam Adams DT; 93 Phillip Daniels DE; 96 Cortez Kennedy DT; 99 Matt LaBounty DE; 76 Riddick Parker DT; 97 Dan Saleaumua DT; 70 Michael Sinclair DE	**Linebackers (LB)**: 94 Chad Brown OLB; 55 Hillary Butler OLB; 90 Mike Croel OLB; 50 DeShone Myles MLB; 51 Anthony Simmons OLB; 59 Darrin Smith OLB; 95 Dean Wells MLB; **Defensive backs (DB)**: 20 Jay Bellamy SS; 25 Mark Collins CB/S; 43 Joey Eloms CB/S; 40 Kerry Joseph SS; 36 Terry McDaniel CB; 24 Shawn Springs CB; 37 Eric Stokes FS; 22 Fred Thomas CB; 33 Darryl Williams FS; 27 Willie Williams CB; **Special teams (ST)**: 10 Jeff Feagles P; 57 Jason Kyle LS; 2 Todd Peterson K	**Practice squad**: 29 Michael Black RB; 19 Mike Jenkins WR; 58 Derek Strey LB; **Reserve**: 63 Frank Beede C/G (IR); 53 Kevin Glover C (IR); 56 James Logan LB (IR); 49 Itula Mili TE (IR); Rookies in italics 53 active, 4 reserve, 3 practice squad

- Starters in bold.
- (*) Denotes players that were selected for the 1999 Pro Bowl.

== Schedule ==
=== Preseason ===
Week	Date	Opponent	Result	Record	Game site	Recap
1	July 31	at Dallas Cowboys	**W** 20–19	1–0	Texas Stadium	—
2	August 8	Indianapolis Colts	**W** 24–21	2–0	Kingdome	—
AB	August 15	San Francisco 49ers	**L** 21–24	2–1	(Canada) BC Place (Vancouver)	—
4	August 22	at Arizona Cardinals	**W** 31–24	3–1	Sun Devil Stadium	—
5	August 28	San Francisco 49ers	**W** 21–20	4–1	Kingdome	—

Source: Seahawks Media Guides

=== Regular season ===
Divisional matchups have the AFC West playing the NFC East.

Week	Date	Opponent	Result	Record	Game site	Recap
1	September 6	at Philadelphia Eagles	**W** 38–0	1–0	Veterans Stadium	Recap
2	September 13	Arizona Cardinals	**W** 33–14	2–0	Kingdome	Recap
3	September 20	Washington Redskins	**W** 24–14	3–0	Kingdome	Recap
4	September 27	at Pittsburgh Steelers	**L** 10–13	3–1	Three Rivers Stadium	Recap
5	October 4	at **Kansas City Chiefs**	**L** 6–17	3–2	Arrowhead Stadium	Recap
6	October 11	**Denver Broncos**	**L** 16–21	3–3	Kingdome	Recap
7	Bye					
8	October 25	at **San Diego Chargers**	**W** 27–20	4–3	Qualcomm Stadium	Recap
9	November 1	**Oakland Raiders**	**L** 18–31	4–4	Kingdome	Recap
10	November 8	**Kansas City Chiefs**	**W** 24–12	5–4	Kingdome	Recap
11	November 15	at **Oakland Raiders**	**L** 17–20	5–5	Network Associates Coliseum	Recap
12	November 22	at Dallas Cowboys	**L** 22–30	5–6	Texas Stadium	Recap
13	November 29	Tennessee Oilers	**W** 20–18	6–6	Kingdome	Recap
14	December 6	at New York Jets	**L** 31–32	6–7	Giants Stadium	Recap
15	December 13	**San Diego Chargers**	**W** 38–17	7–7	Kingdome	Recap
16	December 20	Indianapolis Colts	**W** 27–23	8–7	Kingdome	Recap
17	December 27	at **Denver Broncos**	**L** 21–28	8–8	Mile High Stadium	Recap
Note: Intra-division opponents are in **bold** text.

Source: 1998 NFL season results

== Standings ==
AFC West
	W	L	T	PCT	PF	PA	STK
^{(1)} Denver Broncos	14	2	0	.875	501	309	W1
Oakland Raiders	8	8	0	.500	288	356	L1
Seattle Seahawks	8	8	0	.500	372	310	L1
Kansas City Chiefs	7	9	0	.438	327	363	W1
San Diego Chargers	5	11	0	.313	241	342	L5

== Game summaries ==
=== Preseason ===
==== Week P1: at Dallas Cowboys ====
Preseason Week One: Seattle Seahawks at Dallas Cowboys – Game summary

Quarter	1	2	3	4	Total
Seahawks	7	6	7	0	20
Cowboys	7	3	9	0	19

at Texas Stadium, Irving, Texas

- Date: July 31
- Game time: 8:00 pm local
- Game weather: 103 °F (39 °C)
- Game attendance: 59,357
- TV: KING

==== Week P2: vs. Indianapolis Colts ====
Preseason Week Two: Seattle Seahawks vs. Indianapolis Colts – Game summary

Quarter	1	2	3	4	Total
Colts	7	0	7	7	21
Seahawks	10	14	0	0	24

at Kingdome, Seattle, Washington

- Date: August 8
- Game time: 7:00 pm local
- Game weather: indoors
- Game attendance: 52,645
- TV: KING

==== Week P3: vs. San Francisco 49ers ====
Preseason Week Three: Seattle Seahawks vs. San Francisco 49ers – Game summary

Quarter	1	2	3	4	Total
49ers	14	7	0	3	24
Seahawks	0	7	3	11	21

at BC Place, Vancouver, British Columbia

- Date: August 15
- Game time: 5:00 pm local
- Game weather: indoors
- Game attendance: 45,202
- TV: CBS

==== Week P4: at Arizona Cardinals ====
Preseason Week Four: Seattle Seahawks at Arizona Cardinals – Game summary

Quarter	1	2	3	4	Total
Seahawks	7	24	0	0	31
Cardinals	7	7	7	3	24

at Sun Devil Stadium, Tempe, Arizona

- Date: August 22
- Game time: 7:00 pm local
- Game attendance: 32,683
- TV: KING

==== Week P5: vs. San Francisco 49ers ====
Preseason Week Five: Seattle Seahawks vs. San Francisco 49ers – Game summary

Quarter	1	2	3	4	Total
49ers	0	14	6	0	20
Seahawks	3	3	8	7	21

at Kingdome, Seattle, Washington

- Date: August 28
- Game time: 7:00 pm local
- Game weather: indoors
- Game attendance: 57,014
- TV: KING

=== Regular season ===
==== Week 1: at Philadelphia Eagles ====
Week One: Seattle Seahawks at Philadelphia Eagles – Game summary

Quarter	1	2	3	4	Total
Seahawks	14	0	17	7	38
Eagles	0	0	0	0	0

at Veterans Stadium, Philadelphia, Pennsylvania

- Date: September 6
- Game time: 1:01 pm local
- Game weather: clear, 81 °F (27 °C), 65% humidity, wind SW 10 miles per hour (16 km/h)
- Game attendance: 66,418
- Referee: Larry Nemmers
- TV announcers (CBS): Don Criqui and Beasley Reece
- Gamebook

Game information

First quarter

- SEA – Shawn Springs 42-yard interception return (Todd Peterson kick), 6:54 (SEA 7–0)
- SEA – Joey Galloway 25-yard pass from Warren Moon (Todd Peterson kick), 5:58 (SEA 14–0)

Second quarter

- No scoring plays

Third quarter

- SEA – Mack Strong 11-yard pass from Warren Moon (Todd Peterson kick), 10:43 (SEA 21–0)
- SEA – Joey Galloway 35-yard pass from Warren Moon (Todd Peterson kick), 8:54 (SEA 28–0)
- SEA – Todd Peterson 42-yard field goal, 0:25 (SEA 31–0)

Fourth quarter

- SEA – Ahman Green 6-yard run (Todd Peterson kick), 13:25 (SEA 38–0)

Top passers

- SEA – Warren Moon: 13/21, 204 yds, 3 TD
- PHI – Bobby Hoying: 9/23, 60 yds, 1 INT

Top rushers

- SEA – Ahman Green: 6 car, 100 yds, 1 TD
- PHI – Duce Staley: 20 car, 95 yds

Top receivers

- SEA – Joey Galloway: 6 rec, 142 yds, 2 TD
- PHI – Jeff Graham: 3 rec, 30 yds

Team – pass – rush – total – to

- SEA – 218 – 188 – 406 – 0
- PHI – 12 – 162 – 174 – 3

==== Week 2: vs. Arizona Cardinals ====
Week Two: Seattle Seahawks vs. Arizona Cardinals – Game summary

Quarter	1	2	3	4	Total
Cardinals	0	0	7	7	14
Seahawks	10	10	0	13	33

at Kingdome, Seattle, Washington

- Date: September 13
- Game time: 1:00 pm local
- Game weather: indoors
- Game attendance: 57,678
- TV announcers (Fox): Steve Buckhantz and Trevor Matich
- Gamebook

Game information

First quarter

- SEA – Todd Peterson 51-yard field goal, 6:10 (SEA 3–0)
- SEA – Willie Williams 28-yard interception return (Todd Peterson kick), 5:50 (SEA 10–0)

Second quarter

- SEA – Mack Strong 4-yard run (Todd Peterson kick), 10:03 (SEA 17–0)
- SEA – Todd Peterson 22-yard field goal, 0:00 (SEA 20–0)

Third quarter

- ARI – Adrian Murrell 4-yard run (Joe Nedney kick), 8:34 (SEA 20–7)

Fourth quarter

- SEA – Joey Galloway 9-yard pass from Warren Moon (PAT failed), 14:13 (SEA 26–7)
- SEA – Shawn Springs 56-yard interception return (Todd Peterson kick), 12:03 (SEA 33–7)
- ARI – Chris Gedney 23-yard pass from Jake Plummer (Joe Nedney kick), 4:07 (SEA 33–14)

Top passers

- ARI – Jake Plummer: 22/36, 204 yds, 1 TD, 3 INT
- SEA – Warren Moon: 14/23, 146 yds, 2 TD

Top rushers

- ARI – Adrian Murrell: 20 car, 79 yds, 1 TD
- SEA – Ricky Watters: 22 car, 105 yds

Top receivers

- ARI – Larry Centers: 7 rec, 54 yds
- SEA – Mike Pritchard: 3 rec, 54 yds

Team – pass – rush – total – to

- ARI – 163 – 111 – 274 – 4
- SEA – 121 – 123 – 244 – 2

==== Week 3: vs. Washington Redskins ====
Week Three: Seattle Seahawks vs. Washington Redskins – Game summary

Quarter	1	2	3	4	Total
Redskins	7	0	0	7	14
Seahawks	7	3	14	0	24

at Kingdome, Seattle, Washington

- Date: September 20
- Game time: 1:00 pm local
- Game weather: indoors
- Game attendance: 63,336
- Referee: Mike Carey
- TV announcers (Fox): Sam Rosen and Jerry Glanville
- Gamebook

Game information

First quarter

- SEA – Steve Broussard 90-yard kickoff return (Todd Peterson kick), 14:45 (SEA 7–0)
- WAS – Michael Westbrook 36-yard pass from Trent Green (David Akers kick), 6:09 (Tied 7–7)

Second quarter

- SEA – Todd Peterson 32-yard field goal, 1:11 (SEA 10–7)

Third quarter

- SEA – Ricky Watters 13-yard run (Todd Peterson kick), 12:38 (SEA 17–7)
- SEA – Mike Pritchard 35-yard pass from Warren Moon (Todd Peterson kick), 8:12 (SEA 24–7)

Fourth quarter

- WAS – Michael Westbrook 26-yard pass from Trent Green (David Akers kick), 0:31 (SEA 24–14)

Top passers

- WAS – Trent Green: 27/54, 383 yds, 2 TD, 2 INT
- SEA – Warren Moon: 16/33, 141 yds, 1 TD

Top rushers

- WAS – Terry Allen: 20 car, 92 yds
- SEA – Ricky Watters: 24 car, 136 yds, 1 TD

Top receivers

- WAS – Michael Westbrook: 7 rec, 132 yds, 2 TD
- SEA – Mike Pritchard: 3 rec, 47 yds, 1 TD

Team – pass – rush – total – to

- WAS – 369 – 96 – 465 – 3
- SEA – 136 – 163 – 299 – 0

==== Week 4: at Pittsburgh Steelers ====
Week Four: Seattle Seahawks at Pittsburgh Steelers – Game summary

Quarter	1	2	3	4	Total
Seahawks	0	7	3	0	10
Steelers	3	7	3	0	13

at Three Rivers Stadium, Pittsburgh, Pennsylvania

- Date: September 27
- Game time: 4:05 pm local
- Game weather: cloudy, 85 °F (29 °C), 54% humidity, wind SW 14 miles per hour (23 km/h)
- Game attendance: 58,413
- Referee: Johnny Grier
- TV announcers (CBS): Kevin Harlan and Sam Wyche
- Gamebook

Game information

First quarter

- PIT – Norm Johnson 33-yard field goal, 0:32 (PIT 3–0)

Second quarter

- SEA – Christian Fauria 14-yard pass from Warren Moon (Todd Peterson kick), 12:39 (SEA 7–3)
- PIT – Chris Fuamatu-Ma'afala 10-yard run (Norm Johnson kick), 4:26 (PIT 10–7)

Third quarter

- PIT – Norm Johnson 25-yard field goal, 6:24 (PIT 13–7)
- SEA – Todd Peterson 47-yard field goal, 1:32 (PIT 13–10)

Fourth quarter

- No scoring plays

Top passers

- SEA – Warren Moon: 14/27, 183 yds, 1 TD, 1 INT
- PIT – Kordell Stewart: 16/25, 108 yds

Top rushers

- SEA – Ricky Watters: 17 car, 47 yds
- PIT – Jerome Bettis: 28 car, 138 yds

Top receivers

- SEA – Joey Galloway: 7 rec, 139 yds
- PIT – Courtney Hawkins: 5 rec, 42 yds

Team – pass – rush – total – to

- SEA – 169 – 61 – 230 – 4
- PIT – 100 – 185 – 285 – 0

==== Week 5: at Kansas City Chiefs ====
Week Five: Seattle Seahawks at Kansas City Chiefs – Game summary

Quarter	1	2	3	4	Total
Seahawks	3	0	3	0	6
Chiefs	3	7	7	0	17

at Arrowhead Stadium, Kansas City, Missouri

- Date: October 4
- Game time: 7:20 pm local
- Game weather: rain, 66 °F (19 °C), 97% humidity, wind SE 14 miles per hour (23 km/h)
- Game attendance: 66,418
- Referee: Phil Luckett
- TV announcers (ESPN): Mike Patrick, Joe Theismann and Paul Maguire
- Gamebook

Game information

First quarter

- SEA – Todd Peterson 22-yard field goal, 12:05 (SEA 3–0)
- KC – Pete Stoyanovich 22-yard field goal, 0:50 (Tied 3–3)

Second quarter

- KC – Rich Gannon 4-yard run (Pete Stoyanovich kick), 0:13 (KC 10–3)

Third quarter

- SEA – Todd Peterson 28-yard field goal, 10:01 (KC 10–6)
- KC – Andre Rison 80-yard pass from Rich Gannon (Pete Stoyanovich kick), 0:24 (KC 17–6)

Fourth quarter

- No scoring plays

Top passers

- SEA – John Friesz: 8/19, 52 yds, 1 INT
- KC – Rich Gannon: 12/19, 142 yds, 1 TD

Top rushers

- SEA – Ricky Watters: 22 car, 59 yds
- KC – Donnell Bennett: 17 car, 62 yds

Top receivers

- SEA – Joey Galloway: 5 rec, 50 yds
- KC – Andre Rison: 4 rec, 90 yds, 1 TD

Team – pass – rush – total – to

- SEA – 94 – 73 – 167 – 4
- KC – 120 – 131 – 251 – 5

==== Week 6: vs. Denver Broncos ====
Week Six: Seattle Seahawks vs. Denver Broncos – Game summary

Quarter	1	2	3	4	Total
Broncos	14	0	0	7	21
Seahawks	0	7	3	6	16

at Kingdome, Seattle, Washington

- Date: October 11
- Game time: 1:14 pm local
- Game weather: indoors
- Game attendance: 66,258
- Referee: Ed Hochuli
- TV announcers (CBS): Verne Lundquist, Randy Cross, and Michele Tafoya
- Gamebook

Game information

First quarter

- DEN – Rod Smith 50-yard pass from John Elway (Jason Elam kick), 7:22 (DEN 7–0)
- DEN – Shannon Sharpe 29-yard pass from John Elway (Jason Elam kick), 2:07 (DEN 14–0)

Second quarter

- SEA – Darrin Smith 23-yard interception return (Todd Peterson kick), 14:08 (DEN 14–7)

Third quarter

- SEA – Todd Peterson 23-yard field goal, 8:24 (DEN 14–10)

Fourth quarter

- DEN – Terrell Davis 2-yard run (Jason Elam kick), 13:56 (DEN 21–10)
- SEA – Mike Pritchard 50-yard pass from John Friesz (PAT failed), 10:34 (DEN 21–16)

Top passers

- DEN – John Elway: 13/27, 185 yds, 2 TD, 2 INT
- SEA – Warren Moon: 15/32, 154 yds

Top rushers

- DEN – Terrell Davis: 30 car, 208 yds, 1 TD
- SEA – Ricky Watters: 20 car, 76 yds

Top receivers

- DEN – Rod Smith: 8 rec, 136 yds, 1 TD
- SEA – Mike Pritchard: 4 rec, 91 yds, 1 TD

Team – pass – rush – total – to

- DEN – 171 – 202 – 373 – 2
- SEA – 242 – 77 – 319 – 1

==== Week 8: at San Diego Chargers ====
Week Eight: Seattle Seahawks at San Diego Chargers – Game summary

Quarter	1	2	3	4	Total
Seahawks	7	10	3	7	27
Chargers	0	10	7	3	20

at Qualcomm Stadium, San Diego, California

- Date: October 25
- Game time: 1:15 pm local
- Game weather: cloudy, 67 °F (19 °C), 84% humidity, wind WSW 9 miles per hour (14 km/h)
- Game attendance: 58,512
- Referee: Larry Nemmers
- TV announcers (CBS): Ian Eagle and Mark May
- Gamebook

Game information

First quarter

- SEA – Joey Galloway 81-yard pass from Warren Moon (Todd Peterson kick), 8:46 (SEA 7–0)

Second quarter

- SD – John Carney 21-yard field goal, 10:46 (SEA 7–3)
- SEA – Todd Peterson 40-yard field goal, 8:51 (SEA 10–3)
- SEA – Joey Galloway 74-yard punt return (Todd Peterson kick), 7:26 (SEA 17–3)
- SD – Mikhael Ricks 5-yard pass from Ryan Leaf (John Carney kick), 0:33 (SEA 17–10)

Third quarter

- SD – Natrone Means 1-yard run (John Carney kick), 5:35 (Tied 17–17)
- SEA – Todd Peterson 23-yard field goal, 0:54 (SEA 20–17)

Fourth quarter

- SEA – Ricky Watters 1-yard run (Todd Peterson kick), 8:34 (SEA 27–17)
- SD – John Carney 45-yard field goal, 4:16 (SEA 27–20)

Top passers

- SEA – John Friesz: 14/21, 234 yds, 1 TD
- SD – Ryan Leaf: 25/52, 281 yds, 1 TD

Top rushers

- SEA – Ricky Watters: 18 car, 32 yds, 1 TD
- SD – Natrone Means: 27 car, 92 yds, 1 TD

Top receivers

- SEA – Joey Galloway: 4 rec, 130 yds, 1 TD
- SD – Charlie Jones: 6 rec, 85 yds

Team – pass – rush – total – to

- SEA – 234 – 40 – 274 – 0
- SD – 280 – 111 – 391 – 0

==== Week 9: vs. Oakland Raiders ====
Week Nine: Seattle Seahawks vs. Oakland Raiders – Game summary

Quarter	1	2	3	4	Total
Raiders	7	0	14	10	31
Seahawks	3	7	8	0	18

at Kingdome, Seattle, Washington

- Date: November 1
- Game time: 5:20 pm local
- Game weather: indoors
- Game attendance: 66,246
- Referee: Tony Corrente
- TV announcers (ESPN): Mike Patrick, Joe Theismann and Paul Maguire
- Gamebook

Game information

First quarter

- SEA – Todd Peterson 38-yard field goal, 10:38 (SEA 3–0)
- OAK – Tim Brown 28-yard pass from Donald Hollas (Greg Davis kick), 6:05 (OAK 7–3)

Second quarter

- SEA – Carlester Crumpler 1-yard pass from Warren Moon (Todd Peterson kick), 1:13 (SEA 10–7)

Third quarter

- OAK – Rickey Dudley 27-yard pass from Donald Hollas (Greg Davis kick), 12:53 (OAK 14–10)
- OAK – Albert Lewis 74-yard interception return (Greg Davis kick), 10:15 (OAK 21–10)
- SEA – Ricky Watters 1-yard run (2-pt PAT: Mike Pritchard pass from Warren Moon), 4:35 (OAK 21–18)

Fourth quarter

- OAK – Greg Davis 30-yard field goal, 14:48 (OAK 24–18)
- OAK – Darryl Ashmore 1-yard fumble return (Greg Davis kick), 10:56 (OAK 31–18)

Top passers

- OAK – Donald Hollas: 12/22, 237 yds, 1 TD, 1 INT
- SEA – Warren Moon: 29/39, 275 yds, 1 TD, 1 INT

Top rushers

- OAK – Napoleon Kaufman: 22 car, 56 yds
- SEA – Ricky Watters: 18 car, 54 yds, 1 TD

Top receivers

- OAK – James Jett: 3 rec, 85 yds
- SEA – Ricky Watters: 9 rec, 68 yds

Team – pass – rush – total – to

- OAK – 220 – 73 – 293 – 1
- SEA – 253 – 80 – 333 – 5

==== Week 10: vs. Kansas City Chiefs ====
Week Ten: Seattle Seahawks vs. Kansas City Chiefs – Game summary

Quarter	1	2	3	4	Total
Chiefs	3	3	0	6	12
Seahawks	14	10	0	0	24

at Kingdome, Seattle, Washington

- Date: November 8
- Game time: 1:15 pm local
- Game weather: indoors
- Game attendance: 66,251
- Referee: Bill Carollo
- TV announcers (CBS): Ian Eagle and Mark May
- Gamebook

Game information

First quarter

- KC – Pete Stoyanovich 53-yard field goal, 10:53 (KC 3–0)
- SEA – Ricky Watters 1-yard run (Todd Peterson kick), 5:18 (SEA 7–3)
- SEA – Ricky Watters 1-yard run (Todd Peterson kick), 3:44 (SEA 14–3)

Second quarter

- KC – Pete Stoyanovich 38-yard field goal, 11:50 (SEA 14–6)
- SEA – Todd Peterson 38-yard field goal, 2:00 (SEA 17–6)
- SEA – Darrin Smith 26-yard interception return (Todd Peterson kick), 1:49 (SEA 24–6)

Third quarter

- No scoring plays

Fourth quarter

- KC – Rich Gannon 1-yard run (PAT failed), 0:03 (SEA 24–12)

Top passers

- KC – Rich Gannon: 20/32, 177 yds, 1 INT
- SEA – Warren Moon: 12/20, 108 yds, 2 INT

Top rushers

- KC – Rich Gannon: 3 car, 29 yds, 1 TD
- SEA – Ricky Watters: 24 car, 105 yds, 2 TD

Top receivers

- KC – Derrick Alexander: 7 rec, 91 yds
- SEA – Joey Galloway: 1 rec, 45 yds

Team – pass – rush – total – to

- KC – 260 – 97 – 357 – 4
- SEA – 94 – 108 – 202 – 2

==== Week 11: at Oakland Raiders ====
Week Eleven: Seattle Seahawks at Oakland Raiders – Game summary

Quarter	1	2	3	4	Total
Seahawks	7	3	0	7	17
Raiders	0	7	0	13	20

at Network Associates Coliseum, Oakland, California

- Date: November 15
- Game time: 1:05 pm local
- Game weather: cloudy, 63 °F (17 °C), 65% humidity, wind W 5 miles per hour (8.0 km/h)
- Game attendance: 51,527
- Referee: Tom White
- TV announcers (CBS): Verne Lundquist, Randy Cross, and Michele Tafoya
- Gamebook

Game information

First quarter

- SEA – Joey Galloway 56-yard punt return (Todd Peterson kick), 13:56 (SEA 7–0)

Second quarter

- SEA – Todd Peterson 22-yard field goal, 11:32 (SEA 10–0)
- OAK – Desmond Howard 63-yard punt return (Greg Davis kick), 1:30 (SEA 10–7)

Third quarter

- No scoring plays

Fourth quarter

- OAK – Greg Davis 26-yard field goal, 8:17 (Tied 10–10)
- OAK – Harvey Williams 25-yard run (Greg Davis kick), 3:50 (OAK 17–10)
- SEA – Christian Fauria 12-yard pass from Warren Moon (Todd Peterson kick), 1:01 (Tied 17–17)
- OAK – Greg Davis 38-yard field goal, 0:21 (OAK 20–17)

Top passers

- SEA – Warren Moon: 17/33, 220 yds, 1 TD, 3 INT
- OAK – Donald Hollas: 20/31, 266 yds, 2 INT

Top rushers

- SEA – Ricky Watters: 27 car, 85 yds
- OAK – Harvey Williams: 12 car, 79 yds, 1 TD

Top receivers

- SEA – Mike Pritchard: 5 rec, 79 yds
- OAK – Rickey Dudley: 5 rec, 96 yds

Team – pass – rush – total – to

- SEA – 192 – 101 – 293 – 3
- OAK – 249 – 131 – 380 – 3

==== Week 12: at Dallas Cowboys ====
Week Twelve: Seattle Seahawks at Dallas Cowboys – Game summary

Quarter	1	2	3	4	Total
Seahawks	0	14	0	8	22
Cowboys	10	6	0	14	30

at Texas Stadium, Irving, Texas

- Date: November 22
- Game time: 12:01 pm local
- Game weather: clear, 62 °F (17 °C), 60% humidity, wind SE 15 miles per hour (24 km/h)
- Game attendance: 64,142
- Referee: Gerry Austin
- TV announcers (CBS): Verne Lundquist, Randy Cross, and Michele Tafoya
- Gamebook

Game information

First quarter

- DAL – Richie Cunningham 47-yard field goal, 9:03 (DAL 3–0)
- DAL – Emmitt Smith 8-yard pass from Troy Aikman (Richie Cunningham kick), 1:20 (DAL 10–0)

Second quarter

- DAL – Richie Cunningham 44-yard field goal, 11:56 (DAL 13–0)
- SEA – Joey Galloway 44-yard pass from Warren Moon (Todd Peterson kick), 6:28 (DAL 13–7)
- SEA – Sam Adams 25-yard interception return (Todd Peterson kick), 1:52 (SEA 14–13)
- DAL – Richie Cunningham 28-yard field goal, 0:00 (DAL 16–14)

Third quarter

- No scoring plays

Fourth quarter

- DAL – Billy Davis 18-yard pass from Troy Aikman (Richie Cunningham kick), 13:41 (DAL 23–14)
- DAL – Chris Warren 1-yard run (Richie Cunningham kick), 7:04 (DAL 30–14)
- SEA – James McKnight 5-yard pass from Warren Moon (2-pt PAT: Ricky Watters run), 4:30 (DAL 30–22)

Top passers

- SEA – Warren Moon: 15/28, 201 yds, 2 TD, 1 INT
- DAL – Troy Aikman: 28/42, 296 yds, 2 TD, 1 INT

Top rushers

- SEA – Ricky Watters: 16 car, 66 yds
- DAL – Emmitt Smith: 17 car, 74 yds

Top receivers

- SEA – Mike Pritchard: 6 rec, 72 yds
- DAL – Michael Irvin: 8 rec, 98 yds

Team – pass – rush – total – to

- SEA – 183 – 66 – 249 – 2
- DAL – 292 – 173 – 465 – 1

==== Week 13: vs. Tennessee Oilers ====
Week Thirteen: Seattle Seahawks vs. Tennessee Oilers – Game summary

Quarter	1	2	3	4	Total
Oilers	3	3	0	12	18
Seahawks	0	3	7	10	20

at Kingdome, Seattle, Washington

- Date: November 29
- Game time: 1:05 pm local
- Game weather: indoors
- Game attendance: 59,048
- Referee: Dick Hantak
- TV announcers (CBS): Gus Johnson and Steve Tasker
- Gamebook

Game information

First quarter

- TEN – Al Del Greco 26-yard field goal, 5:49 (TEN 3–0)

Second quarter

- TEN – Al Del Greco 30-yard field goal, 5:57 (TEN 6–0)
- SEA – Todd Peterson 50-yard field goal, 0:03 (TEN 6–3)

Third quarter

- SEA – Joey Galloway 7-yard pass from Jon Kitna (Todd Peterson kick), 6:02 (SEA 10–6)

Fourth quarter

- TEN – Al Del Greco 43-yard field goal, 11:54 (SEA 10–9)
- SEA – James McKnight 55-yard pass from Jon Kitna (Todd Peterson kick), 11:04 (SEA 17–9)
- TEN – Steve McNair 3-yard run (PAT failed), 4:59 (SEA 17–15)
- TEN – Al Del Greco 42-yard field goal, 0:33 (TEN 18–17)
- SEA – Todd Peterson 48-yard field goal, 0:01 (SEA 20–18)

Top passers

- TEN – Steve McNair: 18/34, 199 yds
- SEA – Jon Kitna: 24/39, 298 yds, 2 TD, 1 INT

Top rushers

- TEN – Eddie George: 19 car, 76 yds
- SEA – Ricky Watters: 14 car, 63 yds

Top receivers

- TEN – Eddie George: 5 rec, 64 yds
- SEA – James McKnight: 5 rec, 113 yds, 1 TD

Team – pass – rush – total – to

- TEN – 179 – 164 – 343 – 2
- SEA – 296 – 82 – 378 – 3

==== Week 14: at New York Jets ====
Week Fourteen: Seattle Seahawks at New York Jets – Game summary

Quarter	1	2	3	4	Total
Seahawks	14	7	10	0	31
Jets	7	6	6	13	32

at Giants Stadium, East Rutherford, New Jersey

- Date: December 6
- Game time: 1:02 pm local
- Game weather: hazy, 63 °F (17 °C), 83% humidity, wind W 4 miles per hour (6.4 km/h)
- Game attendance: 72,200
- Referee: Phil Luckett
- TV announcers (CBS): Kevin Harlan and Sam Wyche
- Gamebook

Game information

First quarter

- NYJ – Keith Byars 3-yard pass from Vinny Testaverde (John Hall kick), 7:13 (NYJ 7–0)
- SEA – Joey Galloway 70-yard pass from Jon Kitna (Todd Peterson kick), 5:38 (Tied 7–7)
- SEA – Joey Galloway 57-yard pass from Jon Kitna (Todd Peterson kick), 2:46 (SEA 14–7)

Second quarter

- NYJ – John Hall 20-yard field goal, 9:50 (SEA 14–10)
- SEA – Ricky Watters 39-yard run (Todd Peterson kick), 1:56 (SEA 21–10)
- NYJ – John Hall 20-yard field goal, 0:00 (SEA 21–13)

Third quarter

- SEA – Anthony Simmons 36-yard interception return (Todd Peterson kick), 13:34 (SEA 28–13)
- NYJ – Curtis Martin 1-yard run (2-pt PAT failed), 7:45 (SEA 28–19)
- SEA – Todd Peterson 50-yard field goal, 2:05 (SEA 31–19)

Fourth quarter

- NYJ – Keyshawn Johnson 3-yard pass from Vinny Testaverde (John Hall kick), 12:22 (SEA 31–26)
- NYJ – Vinny Testaverde 5-yard run (PAT failed), 0:20 (NYJ 32–31)

Top passers

- SEA – Jon Kitna: 17/24, 278 yds, 2 TD, 2 INT
- NYJ – Vinny Testaverde: 42/63, 418 yds, 2 TD, 1 INT

Top rushers

- SEA – Ricky Watters: 18 car, 84 yds, 1 TD
- NYJ – Curtis Martin: 17 car, 37 yds, 1 TD

Top receivers

- SEA – Joey Galloway: 2 rec, 127 yds, 2 TD
- NYJ – Keyshawn Johnson: 9 rec, 114 yds, 1 TD

Team – pass – rush – total – to

- SEA – 271 – 106 – 377 – 4
- NYJ – 418 – 70 – 488 – 3

Vinny Testaverde's controversial touchdown on fourth down from the five-yard line with 20 seconds remaining gave the Jets the victory. Replays showed that Testaverde's helmet crossed the goal line, but not the ball. This play is widely attributed as being responsible for bringing back instant replay to the NFL in 1999.

==== Week 15: vs. San Diego Chargers ====
Week Fifteen: Seattle Seahawks vs. San Diego Chargers – Game summary

Quarter	1	2	3	4	Total
Chargers	7	7	0	3	17
Seahawks	14	7	7	10	38

at Kingdome, Seattle, Washington

- Date: December 13
- Game time: 1:04 pm local
- Game weather: indoors
- Game attendance: 62,690
- Referee: Walt Coleman
- TV announcers (CBS): Kevin Harlan and Sam Wyche
- Gamebook

Game information

First quarter

- SEA – Jon Kitna 2-yard run (Todd Peterson kick), 12:31 (SEA 7–0)
- SD – Jamal Williams 14-yard interception return (John Carney kick), 6:07 (Tied 7–7)
- SEA – Terry McDaniel 43-yard interception return (Todd Peterson kick), 2:22 (SEA 14–7)

Second quarter

- SEA – Ricky Watters 1-yard run (Todd Peterson kick), 3:42 (SEA 21–7)
- SD – Terrell Fletcher 1-yard run (John Carney kick), 0:19 (SEA 21–14)

Third quarter

- SEA – Joey Galloway 9-yard pass from Jon Kitna (Todd Peterson kick), 6:01 (SEA 28–14)

Fourth quarter

- SD – John Carney 21-yard field goal, 14:53 (SEA 28–17)
- SEA – Cortez Kennedy 39-yard fumble return (Todd Peterson kick), 13:15 (SEA 35–17)
- SEA – Todd Peterson 29-yard field goal, 8:16 (SEA 38–17)

Top passers

- SD – Craig Whelihan: 8/28, 142 yds, 5 INT
- SEA – Jon Kitna: 16/31, 140 yds, 1 TD, 3 INT

Top rushers

- SD – Terrell Fletcher: 17 car, 42 yds, 1 TD
- SEA – Ricky Watters: 21 car, 69 yds, 1 TD

Top receivers

- SD – Charlie Jones: 5 rec, 78 yds
- SEA – Joey Galloway: 7 rec, 69 yds, 1 TD

Team – pass – rush – total – to

- SD – 211 – 66 – 277 – 8
- SEA – 130 – 108 – 238 – 3

==== Week 16: vs. Indianapolis Colts ====
Week Sixteen: Seattle Seahawks vs. Indianapolis Colts – Game summary

Quarter	1	2	3	4	Total
Colts	7	3	10	3	23
Seahawks	7	3	0	17	27

at Kingdome, Seattle, Washington

- Date: December 20
- Game time: 1:06 pm local
- Game weather: indoors
- Game attendance: 58,703
- Referee: Jerry Markbreit
- TV announcers (CBS): Bill Macatee and John Dockery
- Gamebook

Game information

First quarter

- IND – Lamont Warren 4-yard run (Mike Vanderjagt kick), 9:26 (IND 7–0)
- SEA – Joey Galloway 3-yard pass from Jon Kitna (Todd Peterson kick), 2:56 (Tied 7–7)

Second quarter

- SEA – Todd Peterson 42-yard field goal, 7:31 (SEA 10–7)
- IND – Mike Vanderjagt 32-yard field goal, 0:00 (Tied 10–10)

Third quarter

- IND – Mike Vanderjagt 48-yard field goal, 11:48 (IND 13–10)
- IND – Marcus Pollard 1-yard pass from Peyton Manning (Mike Vanderjagt kick), 6:18 (IND 20–10)

Fourth quarter

- IND – Mike Vanderjagt 20-yard field goal, 12:17 (IND 23–10)
- SEA – Ricky Watters 33-yard run (Todd Peterson kick), 9:19 (IND 23–17)
- SEA – Shawn Springs 14-yard fumble return (Todd Peterson kick), 7:36 (SEA 24–23)
- SEA – Todd Peterson 30-yard field goal, 1:57 (SEA 27–23)

Top passers

- IND – Peyton Manning: 23/39, 335 yds, 1 TD, 1 INT
- SEA – Jon Kitna: 16/29, 177 yds, 1 TD

Top rushers

- IND – Marshall Faulk: 13 car, 19 yds
- SEA – Ricky Watters: 32 car, 178 yds, 1 TD

Top receivers

- IND – Torrance Small: 3 rec, 120 yds
- SEA – Joey Galloway: 5 rec, 50 yds, 1 TD

Team – pass – rush – total – to

- IND – 330 – 32 – 362 – 2
- SEA – 150 – 226 – 376 – 0

==== Week 17 at Denver Broncos ====
Week Seventeen: Seattle Seahawks at Denver Broncos – Game summary

Quarter	1	2	3	4	Total
Seahawks	7	0	0	14	21
Broncos	0	14	7	7	28

at Mile High Stadium, Denver, Colorado

- Date: December 27
- Game time: 2:15 pm local
- Game weather: partly cloudy, 46 °F (8 °C), 26% humidity, wind NW 13 miles per hour (21 km/h)
- Game attendance: 74,057
- Referee: Bernie Kukar
- TV announcers (CBS): Kevin Harlan and Sam Wyche
- Gamebook

Game information

First quarter

- SEA – Ricky Watters 4-yard run (Todd Peterson kick), 2:26 (SEA 7–0)

Second quarter

- DEN – Rod Smith 33-yard pass from John Elway (Jason Elam kick), 10:25 (Tied 7–7)
- DEN – Shannon Sharpe 17-yard pass from John Elway (Jason Elam kick), 1:01 (DEN 14–7)

Third quarter

- DEN – Terrell Davis 2-yard pass from John Elway (Jason Elam kick), 8:26 (DEN 21–7)

Fourth quarter

- DEN – Shannon Sharpe 1-yard pass from John Elway (Jason Elam kick), 11:45 (DEN 28–7)
- SEA – Mike Pritchard 7-yard pass from Jon Kitna (Todd Peterson kick), 5:59 (DEN 28–14)
- SEA – Deems May 7-yard pass from Ricky Watters (Todd Peterson kick), 1:32 (DEN 28–21)

Top passers

- SEA – Jon Kitna: 22/37, 242 yds, 1 TD, 1 INT
- DEN – John Elway: 26/36, 338 yds, 4 TD

Top rushers

- SEA – Ricky Watters: 10 car, 13 yds, 1 TD
- DEN – Terrell Davis: 29 car, 178 yds

Top receivers

- SEA – Mike Pritchard: 8 rec, 88 yds, 1 TD
- DEN – Rod Smith: 9 rec, 158 yds, 1 TD

Team – pass – rush – total – to

- SEA – 217 – 24 – 241 – 1
- DEN – 316 – 195 – 511 – 1

== Awards and records ==
The 1998 Seahawks hold the record for most defensive touchdowns in a season, with 10 (as of the 2007 NFL Season). In 2012 the Chicago Bears tied the record.
