= 1997 Seattle Seahawks season =

American football team season

- Owner: Paul Allen
- Head coach: Dennis Erickson
- Home stadium: Kingdome

Results
- Record: 8–8
- Division place: 3rd AFC West
- Playoffs: Did not qualify
- All-Pros: FS Darryl Williams (2nd team)
- Pro Bowlers: QB Warren Moon; DE Michael Sinclair; LB Chad Brown; FS Darryl Williams

The 1997 Seattle Seahawks season was the team's 22nd season with the National Football League (NFL). This season would mark a new era for the Seahawks as they drafted two first round picks (Shawn Springs and Walter Jones) and traded quarterback Rick Mirer and signed Minnesota Vikings/Houston Oilers quarterback Warren Moon to be John Friesz's backup. Moon and Jones would go on to be selected to the Pro Football Hall of Fame in 2006 and 2014, respectively. They also signed rookie quarterback Jon Kitna. After a Week 1 injury to Friesz, Moon led the Seahawks improvement from 1996's 7–9 record to finish 8–8. This would be Moon's last season making the Pro Bowl in his career, he went on to win Pro Bowl MVP.

This season is notable for being the first under new owner Microsoft co-founder Paul Allen. Allen helped keep the team from relocating and made sure it remained in Seattle.

== NFL draft ==
1997 Seattle Seahawks draft
Round	Pick	Player	Position	College	Notes
1	3	Shawn Springs *	Cornerback	Ohio State	
1	6	Walter Jones * ^{†}	Offensive tackle	Florida State	from St. Louis via NY Jets and Tampa Bay
5	142	Eric Stokes	Free safety	Nebraska	
6	174	Itula Mili	Tight end	Brigham Young	
7	211	Carlos Jones	Cornerback	Miami (FL)	
Made roster † Pro Football Hall of Fame * Made at least one Pro Bowl during career

=== Undrafted free agents ===
1997 undrafted free agents of note
Player	Position	College
Jim Arellanes	Quarterback	Fresno State
Paul Burton	Punter	Northwestern
Andre Cooper	Wide receiver	Florida State
Pete DiMario	Tackle	Alabama
Nick Gianacakos	Defensive end	Boston College
J Ina	Guard	Miami (FL)
David Kempfert	Center	Montana
LeVance McQueen	Linebacker	Duke

== Personnel ==
=== Staff ===
1997 Seattle Seahawks staff
**Front office**: Chairman – Paul Allen; President – Bob Whitsitt; Vice president of finance – Mickey Loomis; Vice president of football operations – Randy Mueller; Assistant player personnel director – Rick Thompson; **Head coaches**: Head coach – Dennis Erickson; Assistant head coach/offensive line – Gregg Smith; **Offensive coaches**: Offensive coordinator/wide receivers – Bob Bratkowski; Quarterbacks – Rich Olson; Running backs – Clarence Shelmon; Tight ends – Keith Gilbertson; Offensive line – Howard Mudd; Offensive assistant – Jim Zorn	**Defensive coaches**: Defensive coordinator – Greg McMackin; Defensive line – Tommy Brasher; Linebackers – Mike Murphy; Defensive backs – Willy Robinson; Defensive – Dave Brown; Defensive staff assistant – Ned James; **Special teams coaches**: Special teams – Dave Arnold; **Strength and conditioning**: Strength and conditioning – Dana LeDuc; Assistant strength and conditioning – Darren Krein

=== Final roster ===
1997 Seattle Seahawks roster
**Quarterbacks (QB)**: 17 John Friesz; 7 Jon Kitna; **1** Warren Moon; **Running backs (RB)**: 31 Steve Broussard; 25 Lamar Smith; **38** Mack Strong FB; **42** Chris Warren; **Wide receivers (WR)**: 83 Tyree Davis PR; **84** Joey Galloway; 81 Ronnie Harris; 18 Daryl Hobbs; 82 James McKnight; **85** Mike Pritchard; 19 Robert Wilson; **Tight ends (TE)**: **87** Carlester Crumpler; 86 Christian Fauria; 88 Deems May	**Offensive linemen (OL)**: 74 James Atkins G/T; **75** Howard Ballard T; 63 Frank Beede G; 60 Greg Bloedorn C; **77** Derrick Graham G; **71** Walter Jones T; **66** Pete Kendall G; **52** Kevin Mawae C; 79 Grant Williams T; **Defensive linemen (DL)**: 98 Sam Adams DT; **93** Phillip Daniels DE; 91 Martin Harrison DE; 99 Matt LaBounty DE; 76 Riddick Parker DT; **97** Dan Saleaumua DT; **70** Michael Sinclair DE	**Linebackers (LB)**: 54 Mike Barber OLB; **94** Chad Brown OLB; 59 Joe Cain OLB; 58 Darryl Hardy MLB; 56 James Logan OLB; 53 Eric Unverzagt MLB; **95** Dean Wells MLB; **Defensive backs (DB)**: 20 Jay Bellamy SS; 26 Tim Hauck SS; 39 Jeremy Lincoln CB; 29 C. J. Richardson SS; 21 Reggie Rusk CB; 23 Dexter Seigler CB; **24** Shawn Springs CB; 37 Eric Stokes FS; 22 Fred Thomas CB; **33** Darryl Williams FS; **27** Willie Williams CB; **Special teams (ST)**: 2 Todd Peterson K; 3 Rohn Stark P	**Practice squad**: 10 Jim Arellanes QB; 65 Larry Moore G; -- Brett Williams DE; -- Tashe Williams T; **Reserve**: **36** Bennie Blades S (IR); 89 Brian Blades WR (IR); 34 Reggie Brown FB (IR); 96 Cortez Kennedy DT (IR); 57 Jason Kyle LS (IR); 92 Henry McMillian DT (PUP); 49 Itula Mili TE (IR); **55** Winston Moss LB (IR); 16 Grayson Shillingford WR (IR); 14 Rick Tuten P (IR); Rookies in italics 53 active, 10 reserve, 4 practice squad

- Starters in bold.
- (*) Denotes players that were selected for the 1998 Pro Bowl.

== Schedule ==
=== Preseason ===
Week	Date	Opponent	Result	Record	Game site	Recap
HOF	July 26	Minnesota Vikings	**L** 26–28	0–1	Fawcett Stadium (Canton)	Recap
1	August 2	Arizona Cardinals	**W** 34–6	1–1	Kingdome	Recap
2	August 9	at San Francisco 49ers	**L** 17–21	1–2	3Com Park	Recap
3	August 16	Indianapolis Colts	**W** 45–3	2–2	Kingdome	Recap
4	August 22	at Cincinnati Bengals	**W** 31–28	3–2	Cinergy Field	Recap

Source: Seahawks Media Guides

=== Regular season ===
Divisional matchups have the AFC West playing the NFC West.

Week	Date	Opponent	Result	Record	Game site	Recap
1	August 31	New York Jets	**L** 3–41	0–1	Kingdome	Recap
2	September 7	**Denver Broncos**	**L** 14–35	0–2	Kingdome	Recap
3	September 14	at Indianapolis Colts	**W** 31–3	1–2	RCA Dome	Recap
4	September 21	**San Diego Chargers**	**W** 26–22	2–2	Kingdome	Recap
5	September 28	at **Kansas City Chiefs**	**L** 17–20 (OT)	2–3	Arrowhead Stadium	Recap
6	October 5	Tennessee Oilers	**W** 16–13	3–3	Kingdome	Recap
7	Bye					
8	October 19	at St. Louis Rams	**W** 17–9	4–3	TWA Dome	Recap
9	October 26	**Oakland Raiders**	**W** 45–34	5–3	Kingdome	Recap
10	November 2	at **Denver Broncos**	**L** 27–30	5–4	Mile High Stadium	Recap
11	November 9	at **San Diego Chargers**	**W** 37–31	6–4	Qualcomm Stadium	Recap
12	November 16	at New Orleans Saints	**L** 17–20 (OT)	6–5	Louisiana Superdome	Recap
13	November 23	**Kansas City Chiefs**	**L** 14–19	6–6	Kingdome	Recap
14	November 30	Atlanta Falcons	**L** 17–24	6–7	Kingdome	Recap
15	December 7	at Baltimore Ravens	**L** 24–31	6–8	Memorial Stadium	Recap
16	December 14	at **Oakland Raiders**	**W** 22–21	7–8	Oakland–Alameda County Coliseum	Recap
17	December 21	San Francisco 49ers	**W** 38–9	8–8	Kingdome	Recap
Note: Intra-division opponents are in **bold** text.

Source: 1997 NFL season results

== Standings ==
AFC West
	W	L	T	PCT	PF	PA	STK
^{(1)} Kansas City Chiefs	13	3	0	.813	375	232	W6
^{(4)} Denver Broncos	12	4	0	.750	472	287	W1
Seattle Seahawks	8	8	0	.500	365	362	W2
Oakland Raiders	4	12	0	.250	324	419	L5
San Diego Chargers	4	12	0	.250	266	425	L8

== Game summaries ==
=== Preseason ===
==== Week P1: vs. Minnesota Vikings ====
Preseason Week One: Seattle Seahawks vs. Minnesota Vikings – Game summary

Quarter	1	2	3	4	Total
Vikings	7	7	7	7	28
Seahawks	0	3	9	14	26

at Fawcett Stadium, Canton, Ohio

- Date: July 26
- Game time: 2:36 pm local
- Game weather: hazy, 77 °F (25 °C), 87% humidity, wind SW 12 miles per hour (19 km/h)
- Game attendance: 23,846
- Referee: Larry Nemmers
- TV: ABC
- Gamebook

==== Week P2: vs. Arizona Cardinals ====
Preseason Week Two: Seattle Seahawks vs. Arizona Cardinals – Game summary

Quarter	1	2	3	4	Total
Cardinals	0	6	0	0	6
Seahawks	0	17	10	7	34

at Kingdome, Seattle

- Date: August 2
- Game time: 7:06 pm local
- Game weather: indoors
- Game attendance: 49,445
- Referee: Jerry Markbreit
- TV: KING
- Gamebook

==== Week P3: at San Francisco 49ers ====
Preseason Week Three: Seattle Seahawks at San Francisco 49ers – Game summary

Quarter	1	2	3	4	Total
Seahawks	0	7	10	0	17
49ers	14	0	0	7	21

at 3Com Park, San Francisco

- Date: August 9
- Game time: 6:05 pm local
- Game weather: clear, 71 °F (22 °C), 66% humidity, wind SW 16 miles per hour (26 km/h)
- Game attendance: 50,153
- Referee: Mike Carey
- TV: KING
- Gamebook

==== Week P4: vs. Indianapolis Colts ====
Preseason Week Four: Seattle Seahawks vs. Indianapolis Colts – Game summary

Quarter	1	2	3	4	Total
Colts	0	3	0	0	3
Seahawks	10	21	7	7	45

at Kingdome, Seattle

- Date: August 16
- Game time: 7:06 pm local
- Game weather: indoors
- Game attendance: 52,844
- Referee: Ed Hochuli
- TV: KING
- Gamebook

==== Week P5: at Cincinnati Bengals ====
Preseason Week Five: Seattle Seahawks at Cincinnati Bengals – Game summary

Quarter	1	2	3	4	Total
Seahawks	7	7	10	7	31
Bengals	0	7	0	21	28

at Cinergy Field, Cincinnati

- Date: August 22
- Game time: 7:30 pm local
- Game weather: clear, 60 °F (16 °C), wind NW 15 miles per hour (24 km/h)
- Game attendance: 43,637
- Referee: Gerry Austin
- TV: KING
- Gamebook

=== Regular season ===
==== Week 1: vs. New York Jets ====
Week One: Seattle Seahawks vs. New York Jets – Game summary

Quarter	1	2	3	4	Total
Jets	17	10	14	0	41
Seahawks	0	3	0	0	3

at Kingdome, Seattle

- Date: August 31
- Game time: 1:04 pm local
- Game weather: indoors
- Game attendance: 53,893
- Referee: Ron Blum
- TV announcers (NBC): Mike Breen, James Lofton and Len Berman
- Gamebook

Game information

First quarter

- NYJ – Wayne Chrebet 35-yard pass from Neil O'Donnell (John Hall kick), 9:07 (NYJ 7–0)
- NYJ – John Hall 55-yard field goal, 7:25 (NYJ 10–0)
- NYJ – Jeff Graham 26-yard pass from Neil O'Donnell (John Hall kick), 4:26 (NYJ 17–0)

Second quarter

- NYJ – Kyle Brady 1-yard pass from Neil O'Donnell (John Hall kick), 13:42 (NYJ 24–0)
- NYJ – John Hall 28-yard field goal, 8:31 (NYJ 27–0)
- SEA – Todd Peterson 31-yard field goal, 0:11 (NYJ 27–3)

Third quarter

- NYJ – Wayne Chrebet 31-yard pass from Neil O'Donnell (John Hall kick), 12:25 (NYJ 34–3)
- NYJ – Jeff Graham 47-yard pass from Neil O'Donnell (John Hall kick), 8:40 (NYJ 41–3)

Fourth quarter

- No scoring plays

Top passers

- NYJ – Neil O'Donnell: 18/25, 270 yds, 5 TD
- SEA – Warren Moon: 7/21, 89 yds, 1 INT

Top rushers

- NYJ – Adrian Murrell: 24 car, 131 yds
- SEA – Chris Warren: 15 car, 64 yds

Top receivers

- NYJ – Jeff Graham: 3 rec, 100 yds, 2 TD
- SEA – Mike Pritchard: 4 rec, 42 yds

Team – pass – rush – total – to

- NYJ – 270 – 164 – 434 – 0
- SEA – 163 – 84 – 247 – 2

This is the Seahawk's worst home loss in franchise history.

==== Week 2: vs. Denver Broncos ====
Week Two: Seattle Seahawks vs. Denver Broncos – Game summary

Quarter	1	2	3	4	Total
Broncos	10	3	15	7	35
Seahawks	0	14	0	0	14

at Kingdome, Seattle

- Date: September 7
- Game time: 1:00 pm local
- Game weather: indoors
- Game attendance: 55,859
- Referee: Phil Luckett
- TV announcers (NBC): Dick Enberg, Phil Simms, Paul Maguire and Jim Gray
- Gamebook

Game information

First quarter

- DEN – Jason Elam 53-yard field goal, 10:37 (DEN 3–0)
- DEN – Ed McCaffrey 14-yard pass from John Elway (Jason Elam kick), 4:22 (DEN 10–0)

Second quarter

- SEA – Carlester Crumpler 12-yard pass from Warren Moon (Todd Peterson kick), 1:11 (DEN 10–7)
- SEA – Chad Brown 26-yard fumble return (Todd Peterson kick), 0:55 (SEA 14–10)
- DEN – Jason Elam 51-yard field goal, 0:02 (SEA 14–13)

Third quarter

- DEN – Ed McCaffrey 32-yard pass from John Elway (2-pt PAT: Shannon Sharpe pass from John Elway), 0:59 (DEN 21–14)
- DEN – Darrien Gordon 32-yard interception return (Jason Elam kick), 0:00 (DEN 28–14)

Fourth quarter

- DEN – Terrell Davis 1-yard run (Jason Elam kick), 7:22 (DEN 35–14)

Top passers

- DEN – John Elway: 18/26, 197 yds, 2 TD
- SEA – Warren Moon: 20/33, 222 yds, 1 TD, 1 INT

Top rushers

- DEN – Terrell Davis: 21 car, 107 yds, 1 TD
- SEA – Lamar Smith: 12 car, 54 yds

Top receivers

- DEN – Ed McCaffrey: 8 rec, 93 yds, 2 TD
- SEA – Joey Galloway: 4 rec, 84 yds

Team – pass – rush – total – to

- DEN – 188 – 143 – 331 – 1
- SEA – 220 – 69 – 289 – 1

==== Week 3: at Indianapolis Colts ====
Week Three: Seattle Seahawks at Indianapolis Colts – Game summary

Quarter	1	2	3	4	Total
Seahawks	7	10	0	14	31
Colts	3	0	0	0	3

at RCA Dome, Indianapolis

- Date: September 14
- Game time: 3:01 pm local
- Game weather: indoors
- Game attendance: 49,194
- Referee: Bernie Kukar
- TV announcers (NBC): Charlie Jones, Bob Trumpy, and Jim Mora
- Gamebook

Game information

First quarter

- IND – Cary Blanchard 46-yard field goal, 9:08 (IND 3–0)
- SEA – Lamar Smith 3-yard run (Todd Peterson kick), 5:40 (SEA 7–3)

Second quarter

- SEA – Warren Moon 1-yard run (Todd Peterson kick), 13:43 (SEA 14–3)
- SEA – Todd Peterson 27-yard field goal, 0:49 (SEA 17–3)

Third quarter

- No scoring plays

Fourth quarter

- SEA – Mike Pritchard 35-yard pass from Warren Moon (Todd Peterson kick), 13:41 (SEA 24–3)
- SEA – Chris Warren 35-yard run (Todd Peterson kick), 2:59 (SEA 31–3)

Top passers

- SEA – Warren Moon: 24/38, 270 yds, 1 TD, 1 INT
- IND – Jim Harbaugh: 11/17, 77 yds

Top rushers

- SEA – Lamar Smith: 12 car, 76 yds, 1 TD
- IND – Marshall Faulk: 17 car, 58 yds

Top receivers

- SEA – Mike Pritchard: 4 rec, 69 yds, 1 TD
- IND – Marvin Harrison: 4 rec, 38 yds

Team – pass – rush – total – to

- SEA – 270 – 153 – 423 – 1
- IND – 23 – 95 – 118 – 0

==== Week 4: vs. San Diego Chargers ====
Week Four: Seattle Seahawks vs. San Diego Chargers – Game summary

Quarter	1	2	3	4	Total
Chargers	0	16	0	6	22
Seahawks	3	10	0	13	26

at Kingdome, Seattle

- Date: September 21
- Game time: 1:05 pm local
- Game weather: indoors
- Game attendance: 51,110
- Referee: Gary Lane
- TV announcers (NBC): Mike Breen and James Lofton
- Gamebook

Game information

First quarter

- SEA – Todd Peterson 41-yard field goal, 10:19 (SEA 3–0)

Second quarter

- SD – John Carney 22-yard field goal, 14:55 (Tied 3–3)
- SD – Rodney Harrison 75-yard interception return (John Carney kick), 13:37 (SD 10–3)
- SD – John Carney 29-yard field goal, 7:13 (SD 13–3)
- SEA – Mack Strong 5-yard pass from Warren Moon (Todd Peterson kick), 3:34 (SD 13–10)
- SEA – Todd Peterson 37-yard field goal, 1:50 (Tied 13–13)
- SD – John Carney 26-yard field goal, 0:11 (SD 16–13)

Third quarter

- No scoring plays

Fourth quarter

- SD – John Carney 41-yard field goal, 13:42 (SD 19–13)
- SEA – Joey Galloway 53-yard pass from Warren Moon (Todd Peterson kick), 13:01 (SEA 20–19)
- SD – John Carney 41-yard field goal, 5:21 (SD 22–20)
- SEA – Steve Broussard 1-yard run (PAT failed), 1:22 (SEA 26–22)

Top passers

- SD – Stan Humphries: 25/46, 239 yds, 3 INT
- SEA – Warren Moon: 17/34, 253 yds, 2 TD, 2 INT

Top rushers

- SD – Gary Brown: 16 car, 46 yds
- SEA – Steve Broussard: 11 car, 72 yds, 1 TD

Top receivers

- SD – Tony Martin: 5 rec, 62 yds
- SEA – Joey Galloway: 5 rec, 106 yds, 1 TD

Team – pass – rush – total – to

- SD – 230 – 79 – 309 – 3
- SEA – 251 – 92 – 343 – 3

==== Week 5: at Kansas City Chiefs ====
Week Five: Seattle Seahawks at Kansas City Chiefs – Game summary

Quarter	1	2	3	4	OT	Total
Seahawks	7	3	7	0	0	17
Chiefs	0	7	7	3	3	20

at Arrowhead Stadium, Kansas City, Missouri

- Date: September 28
- Game time: 3:01 pm local
- Game weather: clear, 79 °F (26 °C), 28% humidity, wind NW 22 miles per hour (35 km/h)
- Game attendance: 77,877
- Referee: Walt Coleman
- TV announcers (NBC): Don Criqui, Jim Mora
- Gamebook

Game information

First quarter

- SEA – Joey Galloway 41-yard pass from Warren Moon (Todd Peterson kick), 8:33 (SEA 7–0)

Second quarter

- SEA – Todd Peterson 44-yard field goal, 9:34 (SEA 10–0)
- KC – Marcus Allen 8-yard run (Pete Stoyanovich kick), 5:11 (SEA 10–7)

Third quarter

- KC – Marcus Allen 1-yard run (Pete Stoyanovich kick), 7:03 (KC 14–10)
- SEA – James McKnight 54-yard pass from Warren Moon (Todd Peterson kick), 5:24 (SEA 17–14)

Fourth quarter

- KC – Pete Stoyanovich 29-yard field goal, 13:14 (Tied 17–17)

Overtime

- KC – Pete Stoyanovich 41-yard field goal, 1:56 (KC 20–17)

Top passers

- SEA – Warren Moon: 19/26, 252 yds, 2 TD, 1 INT
- KC – Elvis Grbac: 24/38, 274 yds, 3 INT

Top rushers

- SEA – Lamar Smith: 12 car, 78 yds
- KC – Marcus Allen: 19 car, 78 yds, 2 TD

Top receivers

- SEA – Mike Pritchard: 4 rec, 88 yds
- KC – Andre Rison: 7 rec, 78 yds

Team – pass – rush – total – to

- SEA – 220 – 156 – 376 – 1
- KC – 263 – 203 – 263 – 3

==== Week 6: vs. Tennessee Oilers ====
Week Six: Seattle Seahawks vs. Tennessee Oilers – Game summary

Quarter	1	2	3	4	Total
Oilers	3	7	0	3	13
Seahawks	0	0	10	6	16

at Kingdome, Seattle

- Date: October 5
- Game time: 1:05 pm local
- Game weather: indoors
- Game attendance: 49,897
- Referee: Dick Hantak
- TV announcers (NBC): Don Criqui and Jim Mora
- Gamebook

Game information

First quarter

- TEN – Al Del Greco 42-yard field goal, 5:33 (TEN 3–0)

Second quarter

- TEN – Eddie George 11-yard pass from Steve McNair (Al Del Greco kick), 6:32 (TEN 10–0)

Third quarter

- SEA – Todd Peterson 38-yard field goal, 10:06 (TEN 10–3)
- SEA – Steve Broussard 77-yard run (Todd Peterson kick), 6:45 (Tied 10–10)

Fourth quarter

- SEA – Steve Broussard 43-yard run (PAT failed), 14:12 (SEA 16–10)
- TEN – Al Del Greco 43-yard field goal, 3:41 (SEA 16–13)

Top passers

- TEN – Steve McNair: 12/28, 101 yds, 1 TD, 2 INT
- SEA – Warren Moon: 27/40, 260 yds

Top rushers

- TEN – Eddie George: 26 car, 116 yds
- SEA – Steve Broussard: 6 car, 138 yds, 2 TD

Top receivers

- TEN – Frank Wycheck: 4 rec, 41 yds
- SEA – Mike Pritchard: 7 rec, 75 yds

Team – pass – rush – total – to

- TEN – 156 – 97 – 253 – 2
- SEA – 238 – 167 – 405 – 2

==== Week 8: at St. Louis Rams ====
Week Eight: Seattle Seahawks at St. Louis Rams – Game summary

Quarter	1	2	3	4	Total
Seahawks	0	3	7	7	17
Rams	0	3	3	3	9

at TWA Dome, St. Louis

- Date: October 19
- Game time: 12:01 pm local
- Game weather: indoors
- Game attendance: 64,819
- Referee: Bill Carollo
- TV announcers (NBC): Joel Meyers and Beasley Reece
- Gamebook

Game information

First quarter

- No scoring plays

Second quarter

- SEA – Todd Peterson 24-yard field goal, 10:07 (SEA 3–0)
- STL – Jeff Wilkins 51-yard field goal, 1:12 (Tied 3–3)

Third quarter

- SEA – Chris Warren 1-yard run (Todd Peterson kick), 11:00 (SEA 10–3)
- STL – Jeff Wilkins 29-yard field goal, 5:46 (SEA 10–6)

Fourth quarter

- SEA – Steve Broussard 9-yard run (Todd Peterson kick), 12:28 (SEA 17–6)
- STL – Jeff Wilkins 46-yard field goal, 4:20 (SEA 17–9)

Top passers

- SEA – Warren Moon: 24/36, 261 yds, 2 INT
- STL – Tony Banks: 17/31, 164 yds, 1 INT

Top rushers

- SEA – Steve Broussard: 8 car, 41 yds, 1 TD
- STL – Lawrence Phillips: 9 car, 18 yds

Top receivers

- SEA – Joey Galloway: 8 rec, 75 yds
- STL – Isaac Bruce: 6 rec, 68 yds

Team – pass – rush – total – to

- SEA – 251 – 106 – 357 – 2
- STL – 155 – 37 – 192 – 1

==== Week 9: vs. Oakland Raiders ====
Week Nine: Seattle Seahawks vs. Oakland Raiders – Game summary

Quarter	1	2	3	4	Total
Raiders	14	11	9	0	34
Seahawks	3	15	14	13	45

at Kingdome, Seattle

- Date: October 26
- Game time: 1:04 pm local
- Game weather: indoors
- Game attendance: 66,264
- Referee: Ed Hochuli
- TV announcers (NBC): Don Criqui, Jim Mora
- Gamebook

Game information

First quarter

- SEA – Todd Peterson 21-yard field goal, 7:22 (SEA 3–0)
- OAK – Napoleon Kaufman 55-yard run (Cole Ford kick), 6:39 (OAK 7–3)
- OAK – James Jett 13-yard pass from Jeff George (Cole Ford kick), 3:13 (OAK 14–3)

Second quarter

- SEA – Todd Peterson 40-yard field goal, 14:08 (OAK 14–6)
- SEA – Brian Blades 7-yard pass from Warren Moon (PAT failed), 6:34 (OAK 14–12)
- SEA – James McKnight 42-yard pass from Warren Moon (PAT failed), 4:16 (SEA 18–14)
- OAK – Cole Ford 53-yard field goal, 1:09 (SEA 18–17)
- OAK – Lionel Washington 44-yard interception return (2-pt PAT: Tim Brown pass from Jeff George), 0:39 (OAK 25–18)

Third quarter

- OAK – James Jett 49-yard pass from Jeff George (PAT failed), 13:11 (OAK 31–18)
- SEA – Joey Galloway 17-yard pass from Warren Moon (Todd Peterson kick), 10:17 (OAK 31–25)
- OAK – Cole Ford 32-yard field goal, 4:19 (OAK 34–25)
- SEA – Joey Galloway 28-yard pass from Warren Moon (Todd Peterson kick), 1:12 (OAK 34–32)

Fourth quarter

- SEA – Todd Peterson 38-yard field goal, 12:55 (SEA 35–34)
- SEA – Todd Peterson 25-yard field goal, 7:24 (SEA 38–34)
- SEA – Joey Galloway 2-yard pass from Warren Moon (Todd Peterson kick), 2:26 (SEA 45–34)

Top passers

- OAK – Jeff George: 18/29, 260 yds, 2 TD
- SEA – Warren Moon: 28/44, 409 yds, 5 TD, 2 INT

Top rushers

- OAK – Napoleon Kaufman: 17 car, 112 yds, 1 TD
- SEA – Chris Warren: 13 car, 76 yds

Top receivers

- OAK – Tim Brown: 7 rec, 107 yds
- SEA – Joey Galloway: 7 rec, 117 yds, 3 TD

Team – pass – rush – total – to

- OAK – 235 – 119 – 354 – 1
- SEA – 409 – 145 – 554 – 2

==== Week 10 at Denver Broncos ====
Week Ten: Seattle Seahawks at Denver Broncos – Game summary

Quarter	1	2	3	4	Total
Seahawks	3	7	10	7	27
Broncos	3	10	14	3	30

at Mile High Stadium, Denver, Colorado

- Date: November 2
- Game time: 2:04 pm local
- Game weather: clear, 46 °F (8 °C), 32% humidity, wind N 14 miles per hour (23 km/h)
- Game attendance: 74,212
- Referee: Tom White
- TV announcers (NBC): Tom Hammond, Randy Cross
- Gamebook

Game information

First quarter

- SEA – Todd Peterson 52-yard field goal, 9:13 (SEA 3–0)
- DEN – Jason Elam 23-yard field goal, 1:52 (Tied 3–3)

Second quarter

- DEN – Willie Green 10-yard pass from John Elway (Jason Elam kick), 11:10 (DEN 10–3)
- DEN – Jason Elam 48-yard field goal, 5:09 (DEN 13–3)
- SEA – James McKnight 20-yard pass from Warren Moon (Todd Peterson kick), 3:12 (DEN 13–10)

Third quarter

- DEN – Darrius Johnson 6-yard fumble return (Jason Elam kick), 14:49 (Den 20–10)
- SEA – Todd Peterson 41-yard field goal, 5:18 (DEN 20–13)
- SEA – Mack Strong 4-yard pass from Warren Moon (Todd Peterson kick), 3:51 (Tied 20–20)
- DEN – Rod Smith 59-yard pass from John Elway (Jason Elam kick), 1:46 (DEN 27–20)

Fourth quarter

- SEA – Brian Blades 8-yard pass from Warren Moon (Todd Peterson kick), 12:02 (Tied 27–27)
- DEN – Jason Elam 22-yard field goal, 7:28 (DEN 30–27)

Top passers

- SEA – Warren Moon: 28/46, 256 yds, 3 TD
- DEN – John Elway: 19/30, 252 yds, 2 TD

Top rushers

- SEA – Chris Warren: 12 car, 55 yds
- DEN – Terrell Davis: 21 car, 101 yds

Top receivers

- SEA – Joey Galloway: 8 rec, 98 yds
- DEN – Rod Smith: 5 rec, 114 yds, 1 TD

Team – pass – rush – total – to

- SEA – 245 – 104– 349 – 2
- DEN – 245 – 140 – 385 – 2

==== Week 11: at San Diego Chargers ====
Week Eleven: Seattle Seahawks at San Diego Chargers – Game summary

Quarter	1	2	3	4	Total
Seahawks	0	10	14	13	37
Chargers	14	3	7	7	31

at Qualcomm Stadium, San Diego, California

- Date: November 9
- Game time: 1:05 pm local
- Game weather: clear, 73 °F (23 °C), 62% humidity, wind WSW 9 miles per hour (14 km/h)
- Game attendance: 64,616
- Referee: Bernie Kukar
- TV announcers (NBC): Don Criqui and Jim Mora
- Gamebook

Game information

First quarter

- SD – Greg Jackson 41-yard fumble return (Greg Davis kick), 13:30 (SD 7–0)
- SD – Tony Martin 19-yard pass from Craig Whelihan (Greg Davis kick), 2:17 (SD 14–0)

Second quarter

- SEA – Todd Peterson 27-yard field goal, 6:58 (SD 14–3)
- SD – Greg Davis 33-yard field goal, 1:16 (SD 17–3)
- SEA – Joey Galloway 30-yard pass from Warren Moon (Todd Peterson kick), 0:22 (SD 17–10)

Third quarter

- SEA – Chris Warren 1-yard run (Todd Peterson kick), 9:00 (Tied 17–17)
- SEA – Michael Sinclair recovered fumble in end zone (Todd Peterson kick), 8:44 (SEA 24–17)
- SD – Paul Bradford 56-yard interception return (Greg Davis kick), 0:30 (Tied 24–24)

Fourth quarter

- SD – Tony Martin 61-yard pass from Craig Whelihan (Greg Davis kick), 11:20 (SD 31–24)
- SEA – Todd Peterson 28-yard field goal, 6:02 (SD 31–27)
- SEA – Joey Galloway 40-yard pass from Warren Moon (Todd Peterson kick), 2:20 (SEA 34–31)
- SEA – Todd Peterson 27-yard field goal, 1:18 (SEA 37–31)

Top passers

- SEA – Warren Moon: 24/45, 295 yds, 2 TD, 1 INT
- SD – Craig Whelihan: 17/29, 206 yds, 2 TD, 1 INT

Top rushers

- SEA – Chris Warren: 16 car, 59 yds, 1 TD
- SD – Gary Brown: 18 car, 59 yds, 1 TD

Top receivers

- SEA – Joey Galloway: 3 rec, 84 yds, 2 TD
- SD – Tony Martin: 5 rec, 100 yds, 2 TD

Team – pass – rush – total – to

- SEA – 281 – 92 – 373 – 2
- SD – 179 – 81 – 260 – 2

==== Week 12: at New Orleans Saints ====
Week Twelve: Seattle Seahawks at New Orleans Saints – Game summary

Quarter	1	2	3	4	OT	Total
Seahawks	0	10	0	7	0	17
Saints	0	7	0	10	3	20

at Superdome, New Orleans, Louisiana

- Date: November 16
- Game time: 12:00 pm local
- Game weather: indoors
- Game attendance: 50,493
- Referee: Mike Carey
- TV announcers (NBC): Mike Breen and James Lofton
- Gamebook

Game information

First quarter

- No scoring plays

Second quarter

- SEA – Todd Peterson 36-yard field goal, 12:44 (SEA 3–0)
- SEA – Darryl Williams 44-yard interception return (Todd Peterson kick), 11:31 (SEA 10–0)
- NO – Ray Zellars 1-yard run (Doug Brien kick), 0:37 (SEA 10–7)

Third quarter

- No scoring plays

Fourth quarter

- NO – Ray Zellars 2-yard run (Doug Brien kick), 13:36 (NO 14–10)
- NO – Doug Brien 19-yard field goal, 9:27 (NO 17–10)
- SEA – James McKnight 34-yard pass from Warren Moon (Todd Peterson kick), 1:40 (Tied 17–17)

Overtime

- NO – Doug Brien 38-yard field goal, 14:43 (NO 20–17)

Top passers

- SEA – Warren Moon: 23/46, 251 yds, 1 TD, 2 INT
- NO – Heath Shuler: 6/14, 64 yds, 2 INT

Top rushers

- SEA – Chris Warren: 22 car, 87 yds
- NO – Ray Zellars: 14 car, 49 yds, 2 TD

Top receivers

- SEA – Joey Galloway: 5 rec, 68 yds
- NO – Andre Hastings: 3 rec, 35 yds

Team – pass – rush – total – to

- SEA – 229 – 111 – 340 – 4
- NO – 102 – 75 – 177 – 5

==== Week 13: vs. Kansas City Chiefs ====
Week Thirteen: Seattle Seahawks vs. Kansas City Chiefs – Game summary

Quarter	1	2	3	4	Total
Chiefs	7	3	7	2	19
Seahawks	7	7	0	0	14

at Kingdome, Seattle

- Date: November 23
- Game time: 1:04 pm local
- Game weather: indoors
- Game attendance: 66,264
- Referee: Larry Nemmers
- TV announcers (NBC): Mike Breen and James Lofton
- Gamebook

Game information

First quarter

- KC – Marcus Allen 1-yard run (Pete Stoyanovich kick), 9:52 (KC 7–0)
- SEA – Joey Galloway 20-yard pass from Warren Moon (Todd Peterson kick), 2:46 (Tied 7–7)

Second quarter

- KC – Pete Stoyanovich 22-yard field goal, 12:15 (KC 10–7)
- SEA – Steve Broussard 22-yard run (Todd Peterson kick), 1:06 (SEA 14–10)

Third quarter

- KC – Rich Gannon 1-yard run (Pete Stoyanovich kick), 9:26 (KC 17–10)

Fourth quarter

- KC – Safety, Joe Horn blocked punt out of end zone, 11:25 (KC 19–10)

Top passers

- KC – Rich Gannon: 15/28, 175 yds
- SEA – Warren Moon: 20/37, 248 yds, 1 TD, 1 INT

Top rushers

- KC – Donnell Bennett: 7 car, 35 yds
- SEA – Steve Broussard: 7 car, 33 yds, 1 TD

Top receivers

- KC – Andre Rison: 6 rec, 90 yds
- SEA – James McKnight: 4 rec, 66 yds

Team – pass – rush – total – to

- KC – 204 – 120 – 324 – 2
- SEA – 223 – 68 – 291 – 3

==== Week 14: vs. Atlanta Falcons ====
Week Fourteen: Seattle Seahawks vs. Atlanta Falcons – Game summary

Quarter	1	2	3	4	Total
Falcons	7	10	7	0	24
Seahawks	0	7	7	3	17

at Kingdome, Seattle

- Date: November 30
- Game time: 1:05 pm local
- Game weather: indoors
- Game attendance: 52,584
- Referee: Ron Blum
- TV announcers (Fox): Kevin Harlan and Jerry Glanville
- Gamebook

Game information

First quarter

- ATL– Jamal Anderson 1-yard run (Morten Andersen kick), 7:12 (ATL 7–0)

Second quarter

- ATL – Jamal Anderson 13-yard pass from Chris Chandler (Morten Andersen kick), 10:28 (ATL 14–0)
- ATL – Morten Andersen 18-yard field goal, 5:30 (ATL 17–0)
- SEA – Joey Galloway 16-yard pass from Warren Moon (Todd Peterson kick), 1:02 (ATL 17–7)

Third quarter

- SEA – Steve Broussard 20-yard pass from Warren Moon (Todd Peterson kick), 8:07 (ATL 17–14)
- ATL – Byron Hanspard 93-yard kickoff return (Morten Andersen kick), 7:50 (ATL 24–14)

Fourth quarter

- SEA – Todd Peterson 35-yard field goal, 8:57 (ATL 24–17)

Top passers

- ATL – Chris Chandler: 15/23, 204 yds, 1 TD
- SEA – Warren Moon: 24/38, 240 yds, 2 TD, 1 INT

Top rushers

- ATL – Jamal Anderson: 16 car, 41 yds, 1 TD
- SEA – Chris Warren: 15 car, 87 yds

Top receivers

- SEA – Mike Pritchard: 4 rec, 71 yds
- ATL – Bert Emanuel: 6 rec, 66 yds

Team – pass – rush – total – to

- ATL – 201 – 72 – 273 – 0
- SEA – 228 – 123 – 351 – 1

==== Week 15: at Baltimore Ravens ====
Week Fifteen: Seattle Seahawks at Baltimore Ravens – Game summary

Quarter	1	2	3	4	Total
Seahawks	7	10	7	0	24
Ravens	3	14	7	7	31

at Memorial Stadium, Baltimore, Maryland

- Date: December 7
- Game time: 1:01 pm local
- Game weather: partly cloudy, 46 °F (7.8 °C), 40% humidity, wind W 18 miles per hour (29 km/h; 16 kn)
- Game attendance: 54,395
- Referee: Dick Hantak
- TV announcers (NBC): Joel Meyers, Jim Kelly
- Gamebook

Game information

First quarter

- SEA – Lamar Smith 4-yard run (Todd Peterson kick), 8:02 (SEA 7–0)
- BAL – Matt Stover 24-yard field goal, 5:04 (SEA 7–3)

Second quarter

- SEA – Safety, Dan Saleaumua tackled Eric Zeier in end zone, 11:31 (SEA 9–3)
- BAL – Jermaine Lewis 89-yard punt return (Matt Stover kick), 9:38 (BAL 10–9)
- SEA – Chad Brown 42-yard fumble return (2-pt PAT: Lamar Smith run), 2:35 (SEA 17–10)
- BAL – Jermaine Lewis 66-yard punt return (Matt Stover kick), 0:35 (Tied 17–17)

Third quarter

- SEA – James McKnight 60-yard pass from Warren Moon (Todd Peterson kick), 11:54 (SEA 24–17)
- BAL – Jermaine Lewis 29-yard pass from Eric Zeier (Matt Stover kick), 4:42 (Tied 24–24)

Fourth quarter

- BAL– Bam Morris 1-yard run (Matt Stover kick), 10:42 (BAL 31–24)

Top passers

- SEA – Warren Moon: 12/19, 140 yds, 1 TD, 1 INT
- BAL – Eric Zeier: 17/28, 302 yds, 1 TD

Top rushers

- SEA – Lamar Smith: 12 car, 47 yds, 1 TD
- BAL – Bam Morris: 24 car, 86 yds, 1 TD

Top receivers

- SEA – James McKnight: 2 rec, 65 yds, 1 TD
- BAL – Derrick Alexander: 6 rec, 150 yds

Team – pass – rush – total – to

- SEA – 170 – 103 – 273 – 4
- BAL – 286 – 88 – 374 – 3

This was the first time the Seahawks had ever played a regular season game in Baltimore against either the Colts or the Ravens.

==== Week 16: at Oakland Raiders ====
Week Sixteen: Seattle Seahawks at Oakland Raiders – Game summary

Quarter	1	2	3	4	Total
Seahawks	0	3	9	10	22
Raiders	14	7	0	0	21

at Oakland–Alameda County Coliseum, Oakland, California

- Date: December 14
- Game time: 1:05 pm local
- Game weather: showers, 55 °F (13 °C), 82% humidity, wind S 15 miles per hour (24 km/h)
- Game attendance: 40,124
- Referee: Walt Coleman
- TV announcers (NBC): Don Criqui and Jim Mora
- Gamebook

Game information

First quarter

- OAK – Olanda Truitt 19-yard pass from Jeff George (Cole Ford kick), 5:38 (OAK 7–0)
- OAK – James Jett 37-yard pass from Jeff George (Cole Ford kick), 2:38 (OAK 14–0)

Second quarter

- SEA – Todd Peterson 27-yard field goal, 9:30 (OAK 14–3)
- OAK – Rickey Dudley 5-yard pass from Jeff George (Cole Ford kick), 1:56 (OAK 21–3)

Third quarter

- SEA – Joey Galloway 8-yard pass from Jon Kitna PAT failed, 12:45 (OAK 21–9)
- SEA – Todd Peterson 27-yard field goal, 5:21 (OAK 21–12)

Fourth quarter

- SEA – Chris Warren 9-yard run (Todd Peterson kick), 13:58 (OAK 21–19)
- SEA – Todd Peterson 49-yard field goal, 2:20 (SEA 22–21)

Top passers

- SEA – Jon Kitna: 23/37, 283 yds, 1 TD, 2 INT
- OAK – Jeff George: 21/31, 274 yds, 3 TD

Top rushers

- SEA – Chris Warren: 19 car, 70 yds, 1 TD
- OAK – Napoleon Kaufman: 16 car, 36 yds

Top receivers

- SEA – Mike Pritchard: 5 rec, 98 yds
- OAK – James Jett: 4 rec, 75 yds, 1 TD

Team – pass – rush – total – to

- SEA – 278 – 103 – 381 – 2
- OAK – 241 – 34 – 275 – 2

==== Week 17: vs. San Francisco 49ers ====
Week Seventeen: Seattle Seahawks vs. San Francisco 49ers – Game summary

Quarter	1	2	3	4	Total
49ers	6	0	3	0	9
Seahawks	7	14	7	10	38

at Kingdome, Seattle

- Date: December 21
- Game time: 5:03 pm local
- Game weather: indoors
- Game attendance: 66,253
- Referee: Ed Hochuli
- TV announcers (ESPN): Mike Patrick, Joe Theismann and Ron Jaworski
- Gamebook

Game information

First quarter

- SF – Gary Anderson 33-yard field goal, 10:25 (SF 3–0)
- SF – Gary Anderson 40-yard field goal, 2:26 (SF 6–0)
- SEA – Joey Galloway 37-yard pass from Warren Moon (Todd Peterson kick), 0:06 (SEA 7–6)

Second quarter

- SEA – James McKnight 21-yard pass from Warren Moon (Todd Peterson kick), 11:05 (SEA 14–6)
- SEA – Mike Pritchard 21-yard pass from Warren Moon (Todd Peterson kick), 8:02 (SEA 21–6)

Third quarter

- SF – Gary Anderson 23-yard field goal, 7:10 (SEA 21–9)
- SEA – Joey Galloway 35-yard pass from Warren Moon (Todd Peterson kick), 3:25 (SEA 28–9)

Fourth quarter

- SEA – Todd Peterson 39-yard field goal, 13:13 (SEA 31–9)
- SEA – Jon Kitna 1-yard run (Todd Peterson kick), 2:54 (SEA 38–9)

Top passers

- SF – Steve Young: 7/12, 87 yds
- SEA – Warren Moon: 16/25, 232 yds, 4 TD

Top rushers

- SF – Chuck Levy: 8 car, 61 yds
- SEA – Chris Warren: 17 car, 99 yds

Top receivers

- SF – J.J. Stokes: 4 rec, 50 yds
- SF – Chad Fann: 3 rec, 50 yds
- SEA – Joey Galloway: 6 rec, 101 yds, 2 TD

Team – pass – rush – total – to

- SF – 199 – 125 – 324 – 2
- SEA – 283 – 124 – 407 – 0

== Awards and records ==
- Warren Moon, Pro Bowl MVP Award
