= Warren Moon =

American gridiron football player (born 1956)

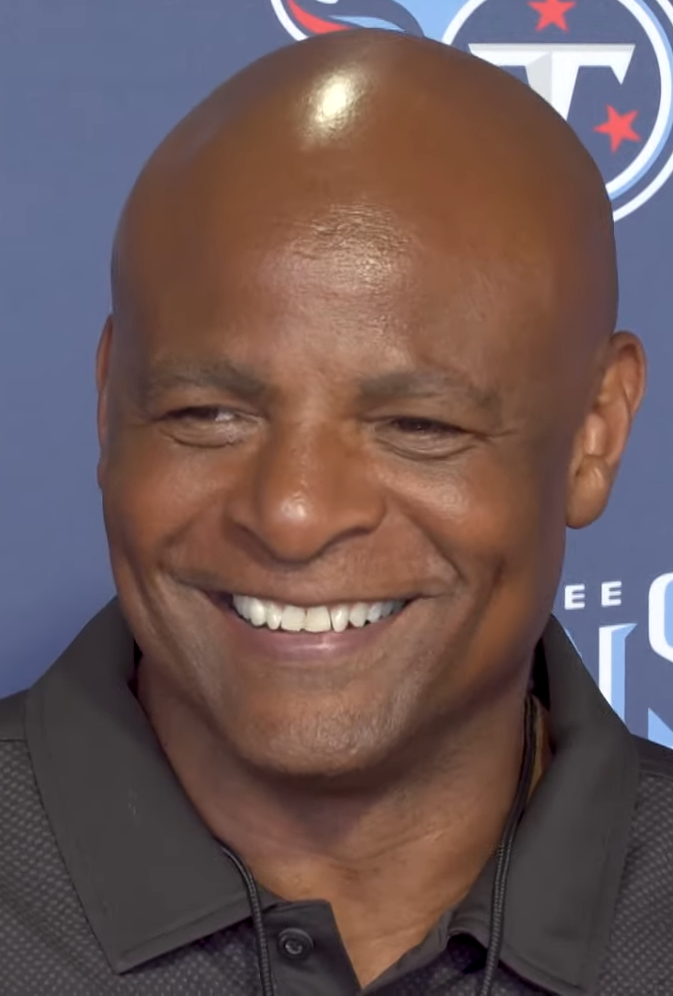
- Moon in 2021

No. 1
- Position: Quarterback

Personal information
- Born: November 18, 1956 (age 70); Los Angeles, California, U.S.
- Listed height: 6 ft 3 in (1.91 m)
- Listed weight: 218 lb (99 kg)

Career information
- High school: Alexander Hamilton (Los Angeles)
- College: West Los Angeles (1974); Washington (1975–1977)
- NFL draft: 1978: undrafted

Career history
- Edmonton Eskimos (1978–1983); Houston Oilers (1984–1993); Minnesota Vikings (1994–1996); Seattle Seahawks (1997–1998); Kansas City Chiefs (1999–2000)

Awards and highlights
- 5× Grey Cup champion (1978–1982); 2× Grey Cup MVP (1980, 1982); CFL Most Outstanding Player (1983); NFL Offensive Player of the Year (1990); NFL Man of the Year (1989); Jeff Nicklin Memorial Trophy (1983); Second-team All-Pro (1990); CFL All-Star (1983); 9× Pro Bowl (1988–1995, 1997); CFL Western All-Star (1983); 2× NFL passing yards leader (1990, 1991); 2× CFL passing yards leader (1982, 1983); NFL passing touchdowns leader (1990); 3× CFL passing touchdowns leader (1979, 1982, 1983); PFWA All-Rookie Team (1984); Titans/Oilers Ring of Honor; Tennessee Titans No. 1 retired; Edmonton Elks Wall of Honour; Pac-8 Co-Player of the Year (1977); NFL record: Most times sacked in a single game: 12 (tied with Bert Jones and Donovan McNabb)

Career NFL statistics
- Passing attempts: 6,823
- Passing completions: 3,988
- Completion percentage: 58.4%
- TD–INT: 291–233
- Passing yards: 49,325
- Passer rating: 80.9
- Rushing yards: 1,736
- Rushing touchdowns: 22
- Stats at Pro Football Reference

Career CFL statistics
- Passing attempts: 2,382
- Passing completions: 1,369
- Completion percentage: 57.5%
- TD–INT: 144–77
- Passing yards: 21,228
- Rushing yards: 1,706
- Rushing touchdowns: 14
- Pro Football Hall of Fame
- Canadian Football Hall of Fame

Harold Warren Moon (born November 18, 1956) is an American former football quarterback who played professionally for 23 seasons. He spent the majority of his career with the Houston Oilers of the National Football League (NFL) and the Edmonton Eskimos of the Canadian Football League (CFL). Moon also played for the NFL's Minnesota Vikings, Seattle Seahawks, and Kansas City Chiefs. He is considered one of the greatest undrafted players in NFL history.

Moon played college football for the Washington Huskies, winning Pac-8 Co-Player of the Year in 1977 and being named MVP of the Rose Bowl at the end of the season. Due to not generating interest from NFL teams, he began his professional career with the Eskimos in 1978. Moon's success during his six CFL seasons, five of which ended in Grey Cup victories, resulted in him being signed by the Oilers in 1984. During his 17 NFL seasons, Moon was named Offensive Player of the Year in 1990 after leading the league in passing yards and passing touchdowns. He led the NFL in passing yards twice and received nine Pro Bowl selections. Moon spent 10 seasons with the Oilers, leading them to seven playoff appearances, and made an eighth postseason run with the Vikings before retiring in 2000.

At the time of his retirement, Moon held several all-time professional gridiron football passing records. Although relatively unsuccessful in the NFL postseason, his five consecutive Grey Cups from 1978 to 1982 remain a CFL record and he was twice named Grey Cup MVP. Moon was inducted to the Pro Football Hall of Fame in 2006, becoming the first African-American quarterback and the first undrafted quarterback to receive the honor. Moon is also the only player inducted to both the Pro Football Hall of Fame and the Canadian Football Hall of Fame.

== Early life ==
Born on November 18, 1956, in Los Angeles, Moon was the middle child amongst six sisters. His father, Harold, was a laborer and died of liver disease when Moon was seven years old. His mother, Pat, was a nurse, and Moon learned to cook, sew, iron, and housekeep to help take care of the family. Early on, Moon decided that he could play only one sport in high school because he had to work for the rest of the year to help his family. Moon chose to play football as a quarterback since he discovered that he could throw a football longer, harder, and straighter than anyone he knew.

Moon enrolled at Alexander Hamilton High School, using the address of one of his mother's friends to gain the advantages of a better academic and athletic reputation than his neighborhood high school could offer. Moon had little playing time until his junior year, when he took over as the varsity starting quarterback. As a senior in 1973, Moon was named to the all-city team and the football team reached the city playoffs.

== College career ==
Moon attended two-year West Los Angeles College and was a record-setting quarterback as a freshman in 1974, but only a handful of four-year colleges showed interest in signing him. University of Washington's offensive coordinator, Dick Scesniak, however, was eager to sign the rifle-armed Moon. Adamant to play quarterback, Moon considered himself to be perhaps a slightly above-average athlete who lacked either the size, speed, or strength to play other positions.

Under new head coach Don James, Washington was 11–11 in Moon's first two seasons as a starter. As a senior in 1977, however, he led the Huskies to the Pac-8 title and a 27–20 upset victory in the Rose Bowl over Michigan. Moon was named the game's Most Valuable Player on the strength of two short touchdown runs and a third-quarter 28-yard touchdown pass to wide receiver Robert "Spider" Gaines.

== Professional career ==
=== Edmonton Eskimos ===
Six weeks before the NFL draft, Moon signed with the Edmonton Eskimos. He and Tom Wilkinson shared signal-calling duties from 1978 to 1981, winning four consecutive Grey Cups during this span.

Moon became Edmonton's starting quarterback midway through the 1980 season. That year, the team won their third consecutive Grey Cup, and Moon won his first Grey Cup Offensive MVP award as Edmonton defeated Hamilton 48–10.

In 1981, Moon started his first year as Edmonton's No. 1 quarterback with Wilkinson, who would retire after the season, as the team's No. 2 quarterback. Moon was moved to the reserve list for Edmonton's game against Ottawa on October 12. During the Grey Cup, Edmonton was trailing Ottawa 20–0 in the second quarter. At this time, Moon was replaced by Wilkinson. Moon returned in the second half and directed drives for three touchdowns and the game winning field goal with three seconds remaining in the game. Edmonton defeated Ottawa 26–23 to win a CFL record fourth consecutive Grey Cup.

In 1982, Moon became the first professional quarterback to pass for 5,000 yards in a season by reaching exactly 5,000 yards. He passed for 36 touchdowns, which set an Edmonton record, and was third in a single season in CFL history. Edmonton recovered from a 3–5 start to finish the regular season 11–5, and first place in the West Division for the sixth consecutive season. The team qualified for the Grey Cup for the sixth consecutive season and won the Grey Cup for the fifth consecutive year. Moon was named the Grey Cup Offensive MVP for the second time in his career.

In his final CFL season, 1983, Moon threw for league-records in pass completions (380), attempts (664), and yards (5,648), records which have since been broken. On October 15 against Montreal, Moon set an Edmonton record by passing for 555 yards, which was third in a single game in CFL history. Moon was nominated as the West All-Star quarterback, and won the Jeff Nicklin Memorial Trophy, which is awarded to the Most Outstanding Player in the West Division. He was then nominated as the CFL All-Star quarterback and won the CFL's Most Outstanding Player Award. The season was not as successful for the Eskimos, however, as they finished with an 8–8 record. Having barely made the playoffs (which they would have missed altogether if not for a loss by the Calgary Stampeders to the last place Saskatchewan Roughriders in the last week of the regular season), the Eskimos lost in Winnipeg to the Blue Bombers in the West semifinal.

During his six years in the CFL, Moon amassed 1,369 completions on 2,382 attempts (57.4 completion percentage) for 21,228 yards and 144 touchdown passes. He also led the Eskimos to victory in nine of 10 postseason games. In 2001, Moon was inducted into the Canadian Football Hall of Fame and the Eskimos' Wall of Honour. Five years later, he was ranked fifth on a list of the greatest 50 CFL players presented by Canadian sports network TSN.

=== Houston Oilers ===
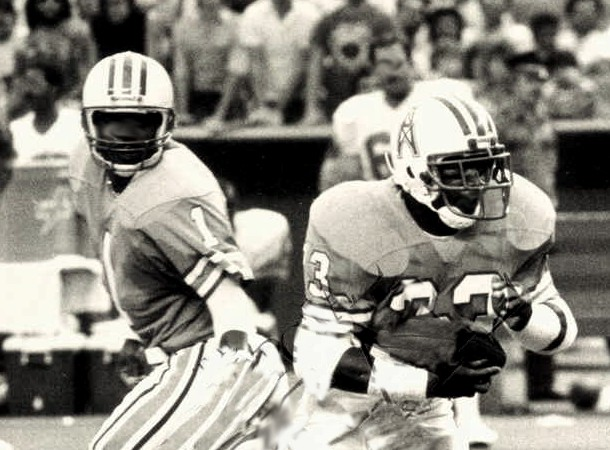
Moon (left) with teammate Mike Rozier in 1987

Moon's decision to enter the NFL touched off a bidding war for his services, won by the Houston Oilers, led by Hugh Campbell, his head coach for his first five seasons in Edmonton. Gifford Nielsen—the starting quarterback in 1983—retired after Moon joined the team, stating that Moon becoming the starter was inevitable. Moon threw for a franchise-record 3,338 yards in his first season in 1984, but Campbell was just 8–22 (.267) at the helm and did not finish the 1985 season. In the strike-marred 1987 season, the Oilers posted a 9–6 record, their first winning season since 1980. In his first postseason game in the NFL, Moon threw for 237 yards and a touchdown in the Oilers' 23–20 overtime victory over the Seattle Seahawks in the Wild Card Round of the playoffs.

Prior to the 1989 season, Moon signed a five-year, $10-million contract extension, which made him the highest-paid player in the NFL at that time. In 1990, Moon led the league with 4,689 passing yards. He also led the league in attempts (584), completions (362), and touchdowns (33), and tied Dan Marino's record with nine 300-yard games in a season. That included throwing for 527 yards against Kansas City on December 16, 1990, the second-most passing yards ever in a single game. The following season, Moon again led the league in passing yards, with 4,690. At the same time, Moon joined Marino and Dan Fouts as the only quarterbacks to post back-to-back 4,000-yard seasons. Moon also established new NFL records that season with 655 attempts and 404 completions.

In 1992, Moon played only 11 games due to injuries, but the Oilers still managed to achieve a 10–6 record, including a victory over the Buffalo Bills at home in the regular season finale. A week later, the Oilers traveled to Buffalo to face the Bills again in the first round of the AFC playoffs. Aided by Moon's 222 passing yards and four touchdowns in the first half, Houston built up a 28–3 halftime lead and increased it to 35–3 when Buffalo quarterback Frank Reich's first pass of the third quarter was intercepted and returned for a touchdown by Bubba McDowell. The Bills, however, responded with five unanswered second-half touchdowns to take a 38–35 lead with time running out in the final period. Moon managed to lead the Oilers on a last-second field goal drive to tie the game at 38 and force overtime. He threw an interception in the extra period, however, that set up Buffalo kicker Steve Christie's game-winning field goal. The Bills' rally from a 32-point deficit was the largest comeback victory in NFL history at the time and became known in NFL lore simply as the Comeback. Moon finished the 41–38 road loss with 36 completions for 371 yards, four touchdowns, and two interceptions. His 36 completions were an NFL postseason record.

The 1993 season was the Oilers' best with Moon but was also his last with the team. Despite a 1–4 start, Houston went 12–4 and won the AFC Central division crown. The Oilers lost, however, to Joe Montana and the Kansas City Chiefs 28–20 in the Divisional Round of the playoffs.

Moon set a franchise record with Houston for wins with 70, which stood until Steve McNair broke it in 2004, after the team became the Tennessee Titans. Moon also left the Oilers as the franchise leader in passing touchdowns, passing yards, pass attempts, and pass completions.

=== Minnesota Vikings ===
On April 14, 1994, Moon was traded to the Minnesota Vikings for a 1994 fourth round pick and a 1995 third round pick; he signed a two-year deal with the Vikings.

Moon passed for over 4,200 yards in each of his first two seasons. The Vikings signed him to a three-year contract extension in 1996. Moon missed half of the 1996 season, however, with a broken collarbone. The Vikings' starting quarterback job was given to Brad Johnson and Moon was released after he refused to take a $3.8 million pay cut to serve as Johnson's backup.

=== Seattle Seahawks ===
Moon signed with the Seattle Seahawks as a free agent in 1997, made the Pro Bowl, and was named Pro Bowl MVP. He played for them for two seasons.

=== Kansas City Chiefs ===
Moon signed as a free agent with the Kansas City Chiefs as a backup in 1999. Moon's 291st and final touchdown pass was an eight-yard pass to Troy Drayton against the St. Louis Rams on October 22, 2000, a game in which the Chiefs defeated the defending champions 54–34. He played in only three games in two years with the Chiefs and announced his retirement at age 44 on January 25, 2001.

=== Legacy ===
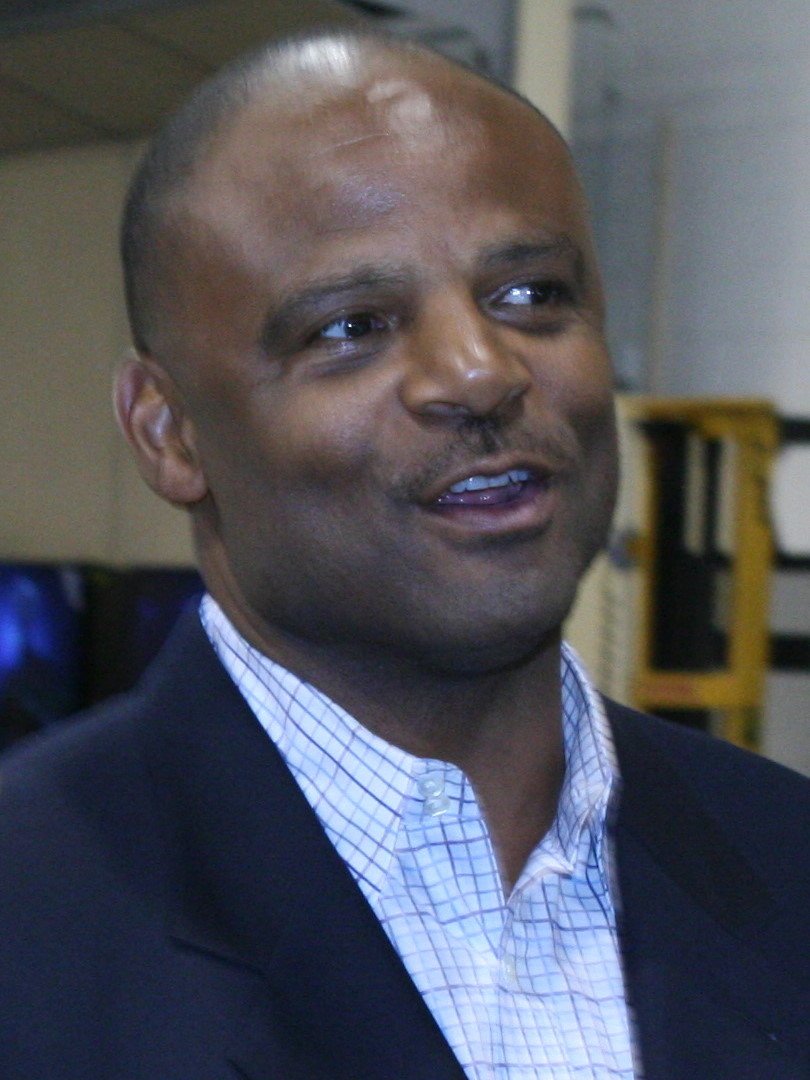
Moon in 2007

Moon was named to nine Pro Bowls (1989–1996, 1998). He accumulated 3,988 completions on 6,823 attempts for 49,325 yards, 291 touchdowns, and 233 interceptions in his NFL career. In the Canadian Football League, Moon added another 1,369 completions on 2,382 attempts for 21,228 yards, 114 touchdowns, and 77 interceptions for a professional total of 5,357 completions on 9,205 attempts for 70,553 yards, 435 touchdowns, and 310 interceptions.

A the time of his retirement, Moon ranked first-all time in:

- Passes completed in a season
- Fumbles in a career
- Fumbles recovered in a career (both own and opponents)
- 300-yard passing games in a season
- Times sacked in a game
- Passes completed in a postseason game
- Career fumbles in the postseason
- Fumbles in a postseason game
- Own fumbles recovered in postseason career

Moon worked as a broadcaster for the Seattle Seahawks from 2004 to 2017, earning his first Super Bowl ring in 2014.

Moon was elected to the Pro Football Hall of Fame in 2006, in his first year of eligibility. Moon became the first Canadian Football Hall of Fame member, first undrafted quarterback, and first African-American quarterback honored.

On October 1, 2006, the Tennessee Titans retired Moon's number at halftime in a game against the Dallas Cowboys. On April 25, 2025, he un-retired his No. 1 Titans jersey to allow quarterback and first overall pick in the 2025 NFL draft, Cam Ward, to wear it.

== Career statistics ==
=== College ===
Year	Team	Passing					
Year	Team	Cmp	Att	Pct	Yds	TD	Int
1975	Washington	48	122	39.3	587	2	2
1976	Washington	81	175	41.7	1,106	6	8
1977	Washington	125	223	56.3	1,772	12	9
Total		254	520	49.8	3,465	20	19

=== CFL ===
Year	Team	Games			Passing								Rushing			
Year	Team	GP	GS	Record	Cmp	Att	Pct	Yds	Avg	TD	Int	Rtg	Att	Yds	Avg	TD
1978	Edmonton Eskimos	15	—	—	89	173	51.4	1,112	6.4	5	7	64.5	30	114	3.8	1
1979	Edmonton Eskimos	**16**	—	—	149	274	54.4	2,382	8.7	20	12	89.7	56	156	2.7	2
1980	Edmonton Eskimos	**16**	—	—	181	331	54.7	3,127	9.4	25	11	98.3	55	352	**6.4**	1
1981	Edmonton Eskimos	15	—	—	237	378	**62.7**	3,959	**10.5**	27	12	**108.6**	50	298	6.0	3
1982	Edmonton Eskimos	**16**	**16**	—	333	562	59.2	5,000	8.9	**36**	16	98.0	54	259	4.8	**4**
1983	Edmonton Eskimos	**16**	**16**	—	**380**	**664**	57.2	**5,648**	8.5	31	**19**	88.9	**95**	**527**	6.2	3
CFL career		94	59	41−17−1	1,369	2,382	57.5	21,228	8.9	144	77	93.8	340	1,706	5.0	14

==== Playoffs ====
Year & game	Team	GP	GS	ATT	COMP	YD	TD	INT	RUSH	YD	TD
1978 West Final	EDM	1	0	0	-	-	-	-	0	-	-
1979 West Final	EDM	1	0	21	10	109	2	0	10	24	0
1980 West Final	EDM	1	1	33	17	257	1	2	10	40	0
1981 West Final	EDM	1	1	40	20	300	1	0	6	49	0
1982 West Final	EDM	1	1	31	18	343	1	1	5	43	0
1983 West Semi-Final	EDM	1	1	25	13	269	1	2	3	27	0
Totals		6	5	153	78	1,359	6	5	34	183	0

==== Grey Cup ====
Year	Team	GP	GS	ATT	COMP	YD	TD	INT	RUSH	YD	TD
1978	EDM	1	0	0	-	-	-	-	1	3	0
1979	EDM	1	0	11	5	96	1	0	5	18	0
1980	EDM	1	1	33	21	398	3	1	7	71	0
1981	EDM	1	1	27	13	181	0	3	12	23	2
1982	EDM	1	1	33	21	319	2	1	9	91	0
Totals		5	3	104	60	994	6	5	34	206	2

=== NFL ===
Legend
	AP NFL Offensive Player of the Year
	Led the league
**Bold**	Career high

==== Regular season ====
Year	Team	Games			Passing								Rushing				Sacked		Fumbles	
Year	Team	GP	GS	Record	Cmp	Att	Pct	Yds	Y/A	TD	Int	Rtg	Att	Yds	Y/A	TD	Sck	SckY	Fum	Lost
1984	HOU	16	16	3–13	259	450	57.6	3,338	7.4	12	14	76.9	58	211	3.6	1	**47**	**371**	**17**	**7**
1985	HOU	14	14	4–10	200	377	53.1	2,709	7.2	15	19	68.5	39	130	3.3	0	46	366	12	3
1986	HOU	15	15	5–10	256	488	52.5	3,489	7.1	13	**26**	62.3	42	157	3.7	2	41	332	11	4
1987	HOU	12	12	7–5	184	368	50.0	2,806	7.6	21	18	74.2	34	112	3.3	3	25	198	8	3
1988	HOU	11	11	7–4	160	294	54.4	2,327	7.9	17	8	88.4	33	88	2.7	**5**	12	190	8	3
1989	HOU	16	16	9–7	280	464	60.3	3,631	7.8	23	14	88.9	**70**	**268**	3.8	4	35	267	11	3
1990	HOU	15	15	8–7	362	584	62.0	4,689	**8.0**	**33**	13	**96.8**	55	215	3.9	2	36	252	**18**	0
1991	HOU	16	16	11–5	**404**	**655**	61.7	**4,690**	7.2	23	21	81.7	33	68	2.1	2	23	174	11	4
1992	HOU	11	10	6–4	224	346	**64.7**	2,521	7.3	18	12	89.3	27	147	**5.4**	1	16	105	7	2
1993	HOU	15	14	10–4	303	520	58.3	3,485	6.7	21	21	75.2	48	145	3.0	1	34	218	13	6
1994	MIN	15	15	9–6	371	601	61.7	4,264	7.1	18	19	79.9	27	55	2.0	0	29	235	9	2
1995	MIN	16	16	8–8	377	606	62.2	4,228	7.0	**33**	14	91.5	33	82	2.5	0	38	277	13	4
1996	MIN	8	8	4–4	134	247	54.3	1,610	6.5	7	9	68.7	9	6	0.7	0	19	122	7	4
1997	SEA	15	14	7–7	313	528	59.3	3,678	7.0	25	16	83.7	17	40	2.4	1	30	192	7	3
1998	SEA	10	10	4–6	145	258	56.2	1,632	6.3	11	8	76.6	16	10	0.6	0	22	140	8	4
1999	KC	1	0	—	1	3	33.3	20	6.7	0	0	57.6	0	0	0.0	0	0	0	0	0
2000	KC	2	1	0–1	15	34	44.1	208	6.1	1	1	61.9	2	2	1.0	0	5	46	1	0
NFL Career		208	203	102−101	3,988	6,823	58.4	49,325	7.2	291	233	80.9	543	1,736	3.2	22	458	3,415	161	52

==== Postseason ====
Year	Team	Games			Passing								Rushing				Sacked		Fumbles	
Year	Team	GP	GS	Record	Cmp	Att	Pct	Yds	Y/A	TD	Int	Rtg	Att	Yds	Y/A	TD	Sck	SckY	Fum	Lost
1987	HOU	2	2	1–1	45	75	60.0	537	7.2	2	3	74.1	9	13	1.4	0	2	14	2	1
1988	HOU	2	2	1–1	33	59	55.9	453	7.7	1	**4**	58.1	**11**	**27**	2.5	0	3	22	3	0
1989	HOU	1	1	0–1	29	48	60.4	315	6.6	2	0	93.7	3	12	4.0	0	0	0	1	0
1990	HOU	0	0	did not play due to injury																
1991	HOU	2	2	1–1	**55**	**76**	72.4	**596**	**7.8**	**5**	2	**106.0**	5	24	4.8	0	4	39	3	1
1992	HOU	1	1	0–1	36	50	72.0	371	7.4	4	2	103.0	2	7	3.5	0	4	24	1	0
1993	HOU	1	1	0–1	32	43	**74.4**	306	7.1	1	1	91.8	3	22	**7.3**	0	**9**	**68**	**5**	**2**
1994	MIN	1	1	0–1	29	52	55.8	292	5.6	2	2	68.7	2	9	4.5	0	2	11	1	0
1996	MIN	0	0	did not play due to injury																
NFL Career		10	10	3–7	259	403	64.3	2,870	7.1	17	14	84.9	35	114	3.3	0	24	178	16	4

== Career highlights ==
=== Awards and honors ===
NFL

- NFL Offensive Player of the Year (1990)
- NFL Man of the Year (1989)
- Second-team All-Pro (1990)
- 9× Pro Bowl (1988–1995, 1997)
- Pro Bowl MVP (1997)
- 2× NFL passing yards leader (1990, 1991)
- NFL passing touchdowns leader (1990)
- PFWA All-Rookie Team (1984)
- Titans/Oilers Ring of Honor
- Tennessee Titans No. 1 retired
- Bart Starr Award (1994)
- NEA NFL MVP (1990)
- UPI AFL-AFC Player of the Year (1990)
- Pro Football Hall of Fame (2006)

CFL

- 5× Grey Cup champion (1978–1982)
- 2× Grey Cup MVP (1980, 1982)
- CFL Most Outstanding Player (1983)
- Jeff Nicklin Memorial Trophy (1983)
- CFL All-Star (1983)
- CFL Western All-Star (1983)
- 2× CFL passing yards leader (1982, 1983)
- 3× CFL passing touchdowns leader (1979, 1982, 1983)
- Edmonton Elks Wall of Honour
- Canadian Football Hall of Fame (2001)

College

- Pac-8 Co-Player of the Year (1977)
- Rose Bowl MVP (1978)
- University of Washington Ring of Honor (2013, inaugural member)

Other honors

- Texas Sports Hall of Fame

=== Records ===
==== Oilers/Titans franchise records ====
As of 2019's NFL off-season, Moon still held at least 37 Titans franchise records, including:

- Most Completions (career): 2,632
- Most Completions (season): 404 (1991)
- Most Completions (game): 41 (1991-11-10 DAL)
- Most Completions (playoff career): 230
- Most Completions (playoff game): 36 (1993-01-03 @BUF)
- Most Completions (rookie season): 259 (1984)
- Most Pass Attempts (career): 4,546
- Most Pass Attempts (season): 655 (1991)
- Most Pass Attempts (playoff career): 351
- Most Pass Attempts (playoff game): 50 (1993-01-03 @BUF)
- Most Pass Attempts (rookie season): 450 (1984)
- Most Passing Yards (career): 33,685
- Most Passing Yards (season): 4,690 (1991)
- Most Passing Yards (game): 527 (1990-12-16 @KAN)
- Most Passing Yards (playoff career): 2,578
- Most Passing Yards (playoff game): 371 (1993-01-03 @BUF)
- Most Passing Yards (rookie season): 3,338 (1984)
- Most Passing TDs (career): 196
- Most Passing TDs (playoff career): 15
- Most Passing TDs (playoff season): 5 (1991)
- Most Passing TDs (playoff game): 4 (1993-01-03 @BUF)
- Most Pass Yds/Game (career): 238.9
- Most Pass Yds/Game (season): 312.6 (1990)
- Most Pass Yds/Game (playoff career): 286.4
- Most Pass Yds/Game (playoff season): 371 (1992)
- Most 300+ yard passing games (career): 42
- Most 300+ yard passing games (season): 9 (1990)
- Most 300+ yard passing games (playoffs): 4
- Most 300+ yard passing games (rookie season): 4
- Most 4,000+ passing yard seasons: 2
- Most Intercepted (playoff career): 12
- Most Sacked (career): 315
- Most Sacked (season): 47 (1984)
- Most Sacked (game): 12 (1985-09-29 DAL)
- Most Sacked (playoff career): 22
- Most Sacked (playoff game): 9 (1994-01-16 KAN)
- Most Sacked (rookie season): 47 (1984)

==== Seahawks franchise records ====
- Most consecutive completed passes in a game (Raiders at Seahawks, November 1, 1998) – 17 (tied with Sam Darnold)

== Post-NFL career ==
Moon mentored Cam Newton, the first overall pick of the 2011 NFL draft, alluding to their common experiences as prominent African-American quarterbacks. In December 2017, Moon was suspended indefinitely from his sportscaster position after being sued for sexual harassment.

== Personal life ==
In 1981, Moon married Felicia Hendricks, whom he had known since they were 16 years old. They had three children together and divorced in 2001. In February 1996, Moon was acquitted of a misdemeanor charge of spousal assault. Moon married his second wife, Mandy Ritter, in 2005. They had one child and are currently separated.

As of 2020, Moon lives in Redmond, Washington. In 1989, he launched the Crescent Moon Foundation, which provides college scholarships for economically disadvantaged students. Moon also supports various charitable organizations including the United Negro College Fund, Ronald McDonald House, Muscular Dystrophy Association, Cystic Fibrosis Foundation, American Heart Association, and Cerebral Palsy Foundation.

== See also ==
- List of 500-yard passing games in the National Football League
- List of National Football League career quarterback wins leaders
- List of gridiron football quarterbacks passing statistics
