= Greg Bloedorn =

American football player (born 1972)

No. 60
- Position: Offensive lineman

Personal information
- Born: November 15, 1972 (age 53); Elmhurst, Illinois, U.S.
- Listed height: 6 ft 6 in (1.98 m)
- Listed weight: 278 lb (126 kg)

Career information
- High school: Glenbard South (Glen Ellyn, Illinois)
- College: Cornell
- NFL draft: 1996: undrafted

Career history
- Seattle Seahawks (1996–1999); → England Monarchs (1998)

Career NFL statistics
- Games played: 11
- Stats at Pro Football Reference

Greg Bloedorn (born November 15, 1972) was an American professional football offensive lineman for the Seattle Seahawks of the National Football League. He was signed by the Seahawks in 1996. Bloedorn played college football at Cornell University. His professional career spanned three active roster seasons with the Seattle Seahawks: 1997 to 1999 until he was released in 2000.

== High school football ==
Bloedorn was born in Elmhurst, Illinois. He attended high school at Glenbard South in Glen Ellyn, Illinois. Bloedorn played football and basketball in high school. He graduated in 1991.

== College football ==
Bloedorn played college football at Cornell University from 1991 to 1995. His first year he played tight end and was named the team's Most Improved Player. He was injured his third year and only played two games. Bloedorn's Cornell biography states that in his senior year he "received Football News All-Ivy first-team honors, and was All-Ivy first-team as voted by the coaches. He was a two-time recipient of the Sid Roth Most Valuable Down Lineman Award. A tri-captain as a senior, he earned National Football Gazette All-America second-team honors"

== Professional football ==
Bloedorn was signed as a free agent by the Seattle Seahawks in 1996. His first season was spent on the practice squad. In the 1997 season he played in three games as a center and long snapper. The following year, he participated in NFL Europe with the England Monarchs. Bloedorn's final season was with the Seahawks.

=== Career statistics ===
Season	Team	Games		Receiving					Rushing					Fumbles	
Season	Team	GP	GS	Rec	Yds	Avg	Lng	TD	Att	Yds	Avg	Lng	TD	FUM	Lost
1997	Seattle Seahawks	2	0	–	–	–	–	–	–	–	–	–	–	–	–
1998	Seattle Seahawks	–	–	–	–	–	–	–	–	–	–	–	–	–	–
1999	Seattle Seahawks	9	0	–	–	–	–	–	–	−6	–	–	–	–	–
	Total	11	–	–	–	–	–	–	–	−6	–	–	–	–	–
