= 1998 Pro Bowl =

National Football League all-star game

1998 NFL Pro Bowl
NFC	AFC
24	29
Head coach: Steve Mariucci (San Francisco 49ers)	Head coach: Bill Cowher (Pittsburgh Steelers)
	1	2	3	4	Total
NFC	7	14	0	3	24
AFC	7	0	7	15	29
- Date: February 1, 1998
- Stadium: Aloha Stadium; Honolulu, Hawaii
- MVP: Warren Moon (Seattle Seahawks)
- Referee: Gary Lane
- Attendance: 49,995

Ceremonies
- Halftime show: Salt-N-Pepa

TV in the United States
- Network: ABC
- Announcers: Al Michaels, Frank Gifford, Dan Dierdorf, Lynn Swann and Lesley Visser

The 1998 Pro Bowl was the NFL's all-star game for the 1997 season. The game was played on February 1, 1998, at Aloha Stadium in Honolulu, Hawaii. The final score was AFC 29, NFC 24. Warren Moon of the Seattle Seahawks, invited to participate because of an injury to John Elway, was the game's MVP. The referee was Gary Lane. The halftime show was Montell Jordan.

== AFC ==
=== Quarterbacks ===
- John Elway – Denver Broncos (Injured, did not play)
- Drew Bledsoe – New England Patriots
- Mark Brunell – Jacksonville Jaguars
- Warren Moon – Seattle Seahawks (injury replacement)

=== Running backs ===
- Terrell Davis – Denver Broncos
- Jerome Bettis – Pittsburgh Steelers
- Kimble Anders – Kansas City Chiefs
- Eddie George – Tennessee Titans

=== Wide receivers ===
- Tim Brown – Oakland Raiders
- Yancey Thigpen – Pittsburgh Steelers
- Andre Rison – Kansas City Chiefs
- Jimmy Smith – Jacksonville Jaguars
- Eric Metcalf - San Diego Chargers (Return Specialist)

=== Tight ends ===
- Ben Coates – New England Patriots
- Shannon Sharpe – Denver Broncos

=== Offensive linemen ===
- Tony Boselli – Jacksonville Jaguars
- Ruben Brown – Buffalo Bills
- Dermontti Dawson – Pittsburgh Steelers
- Bruce Armstrong – New England Patriots
- Bruce Matthews – Tennessee Oilers (injured, did not play)
- Tom Nalen – Denver Broncos
- Jonathan Ogden – Baltimore Ravens
- Steve Wisniewski- Oakland Raiders (injury replacement)
- Will Shields – Kansas City Chiefs

=== Defensive linemen ===
- Tim Bowens – Miami Dolphins
- Michael McCrary – Baltimore Ravens
- Darrell Russell – Oakland Raiders
- Michael Sinclair – Seattle Seahawks
- Bruce Smith – Buffalo Bills
- Ted Washington – Buffalo Bills

=== Linebackers ===
- Mo Lewis – New York Jets
- Ray Lewis – Baltimore Ravens
- Junior Seau – San Diego Chargers
- Derrick Thomas - Kansas City Chiefs
- Chris Slade - New England Patriots
- Levon Kirkland - Pittsburgh Steelers

=== Defensive backs ===
- Ty Law – New England Patriots
- Lawyer Milloy – New England Patriots
- Darryl Williams – Seattle Seahawks
- Carnell Lake - Pittsburgh Steelers
- James Hasty - Kansas City Chiefs

=== Kicker ===
- Mike Hollis - Jacksonville Jaguars

=== Punter ===
- Bryan Barker - Jacksonville Jaguars

== NFC ==
=== Quarterbacks ===
- Brett Favre – Green Bay Packers (injured – did not play)
- Chris Chandler – Atlanta Falcons (injury replacement)
- Steve Young – San Francisco 49ers
- Trent Dilfer – Tampa Bay Buccaneers

=== Running backs ===
- Mike Alstott – Tampa Bay Buccaneers
- Warrick Dunn – Tampa Bay Buccaneers
- Dorsey Levens – Green Bay Packers
- Barry Sanders – Detroit Lions
- Travis Jervey - Green Bay Packers (Special Teamer)
- Michael Bates - Carolina Panthers (Return Specialist)

=== Wide receivers ===
- Herman Moore – Detroit Lions
- Cris Carter – Minnesota Vikings
- Irving Fryar – Philadelphia Eagles
- Rob Moore – Arizona Cardinals

=== Tight ends ===
- Mark Chmura – Green Bay Packers
- Wesley Walls – Carolina Panthers

=== Offensive linemen ===
- Larry Allen – Dallas Cowboys
- Jeff Christy – Minnesota Vikings
- Kevin Gogan – San Francisco 49ers
- Randall McDaniel – Minnesota Vikings
- William Roaf – New Orleans Saints
- Todd Steussie – Minnesota Vikings
- Tony Mayberry – Tampa Bay Buccaneers
- Nate Newton – Dallas Cowboys

=== Defensive linemen ===
- Warren Sapp – Tampa Bay Buccaneers
- Michael Strahan – New York Giants
- Kevin Carter – St. Louis Rams
- Robert Porcher – Detroit Lions
- Luther Elliss – Detroit Lions
- Dana Stubblefield – San Francisco 49ers
- John Randle – Minnesota Vikings

=== Linebackers ===
- Jessie Armstead – New York Giants
- Derrick Brooks – Tampa Bay Buccaneers
- Hardy Nickerson – Tampa Bay Buccaneers
- Jessie Tuggle – Atlanta Falcons
- Ken Norton Jr. - San Francisco 49ers
- Lee Woodall - San Francisco 49ers

=== Defensive backs ===
- Merton Hanks - San Francisco 49ers
- LeRoy Butler – Green Bay Packers
- John Lynch – Tampa Bay Buccaneers
- Deion Sanders – Dallas Cowboys (did not play)
- Aeneas Williams – Arizona Cardinals
- Darren Woodson – Dallas Cowboys (injured, did not play)

=== Kicker ===
- Jason Hanson - Detroit Lions

=== Punter ===
- Matt Turk - Washington Redskins
