= Joey Galloway =

American football player (born 1971)

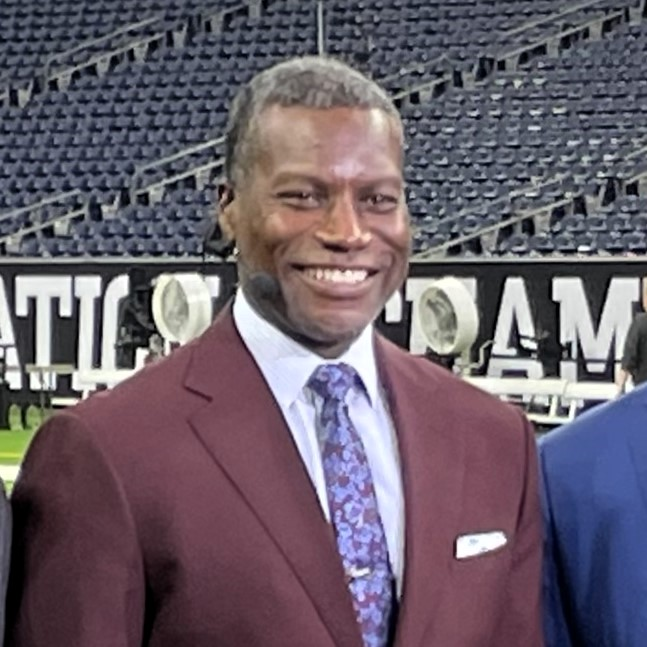
- Galloway in 2024

No. 84, 13
- Position: Wide receiver

Personal information
- Born: November 20, 1971 (age 54); Bellaire, Ohio, U.S.
- Listed height: 5 ft 11 in (1.80 m)
- Listed weight: 197 lb (89 kg)

Career information
- High school: Bellaire
- College: Ohio State (1990–1994)
- NFL draft: 1995: 1st round, 8th overall pick

Career history

Playing
- Seattle Seahawks (1995–1999); Dallas Cowboys (2000–2003); Tampa Bay Buccaneers (2004–2008); New England Patriots (2009); Pittsburgh Steelers (2009); Washington Redskins (2010)

Operations
- Columbus Destroyers (2003–2008) Owner

Awards and highlights
- PFWA All-Rookie Team (1995); Third-team All-American (1993); First-team All-Big Ten (1993); Second-team All-Big Ten (1994)

Career NFL statistics
- Receptions: 701
- Receiving yards: 10,950
- Receiving touchdowns: 77
- Return yards: 1,417
- Return touchdowns: 5
- Stats at Pro Football Reference

Joseph Scott Galloway (born November 20, 1971) is an American former professional football player who is an analyst with ESPN. He was a wide receiver in the National Football League (NFL). Galloway was selected by the Seattle Seahawks with the eighth overall pick of the 1995 NFL draft, and also played for the Dallas Cowboys, Tampa Bay Buccaneers, New England Patriots, Pittsburgh Steelers, and Washington Redskins. He played college football for the Ohio State Buckeyes.

== Early life ==
Galloway played high school football at Bellaire High School in Bellaire, Ohio. During his senior year, he caught 52 passes for 1208 yards and eight touchdowns. He also was an All-Ohio choice in basketball and was a letterman in track.

== College career ==
Galloway played college football at Ohio State. While there he earned many honors and finished in the top five all time in many of Ohio State's receiving records. During his junior year, he caught 47 passes for 946 yards and tied Cris Carter with a school record 11 touchdowns. His great play earned him first-team All-Big Ten Conference honors as a junior. During his senior year, he made 44 receptions for 769 yards and seven touchdowns, and earned Second-team All-Big Ten Conference. He finished his college career fourth in both career receptions with 108 and receiving yards with 1,494, and second in touchdown receptions behind Cris Carter with 19.

== Professional career ==
Pre-draft measurables
Height	Weight	Arm length	Hand span
5 ft 10 3/8 in (1.79 m)	183 lb (83 kg)	30 5/8 in (0.78 m)	10 1/4 in (0.26 m)
All values from NFL Draft

=== Seattle Seahawks ===
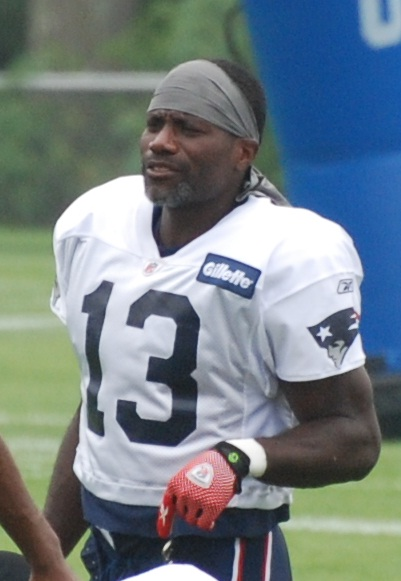
Galloway with the Patriots in 2009

Galloway was selected by the Seattle Seahawks in the first round with the eighth overall pick in the 1995 NFL draft. He made an immediate impact for the Seahawks, setting franchise season records for a rookie with 67 receptions, 1,067 receiving yards and three 100-yard games. He also had success as a punt returner, returning 36 punts for 360 yards and a touchdown.

During his second year he started all 16 games for the Seahawks, leading the team in receptions with 57, receiving yards with 987 and touchdowns with seven. During his third year in 1997 he made 72 receptions for 1,049 yards and 12 touchdowns. In 1998, he reached double digit receiving touchdowns for the second consecutive year with ten. He finished the season with 65 receptions for 1,047 yards.

During the 1999 season he played in only eight games due to a contract dispute and a holdout that reached 101 days. When he came back he made 22 receptions for 335 yards and only one touchdown. Overall, he finished his career with the Seahawks with 283 receptions for 4,457 yards and 37 touchdowns in 71 games.

On February 12, 2000, The Seahawks traded Galloway to the Dallas Cowboys in exchange for their first round selections in the 2000 and 2001 NFL drafts (which would produce Shaun Alexander and Koren Robinson).

=== Dallas Cowboys ===
With quarterback Troy Aikman playing his last years and Michael Irvin looking to retire after suffering a career-ending injury in the 1999 season, the Dallas Cowboys were seeking an elite wide receiver to pair with Raghib Ismail and thus turned to the Seattle Seahawks for the rights to Galloway, signing him to a deal that made him the second highest paid wide receiver in the league at the time.

During his first season with the Cowboys, Galloway played in only one game before tearing the ACL in his left knee in the fourth quarter of the season opener against the Philadelphia Eagles. He finished the game with four receptions for 62 yards and a touchdown. The next year, he rebounded from the injury, starting all 16 games and finishing second on the team in receptions with 52 and receiving yards with 699 and first in receiving touchdowns with three.

In 2002, Galloway started all 16 games, making 61 receptions for 908 yards and six touchdowns. In 2003, he started 13 of 14 games, making 34 catches for 672 yards and two touchdowns and led the NFL with a 19.8 yards-per-catch average. He finished his career with the Cowboys with 151 receptions for 2,341 yards and 12 touchdowns. Besides the loss of the two first round draft selections, his contract contributed to the salary cap problems that affected Dave Campo's years as head coach.

On March 19, 2004, the Cowboys traded Galloway to the Tampa Bay Buccaneers for Keyshawn Johnson.

=== Tampa Bay Buccaneers ===
Galloway suffered a groin injury in the season opener against the Washington Redskins and was inactive for the next six games of the 2004 season, playing in ten games, he made 33 receptions for 416 yards and five touchdowns. After the season, he re-signed with the Bucs.

In 2005, he enjoyed his best season as a professional, catching a career-high 83 passes (fifth in team history) for 1,287 yards (second in team history) and ten touchdowns. The next year, he started 14 of 16 games, making 62 receptions for 1,057 and seven touchdowns. It was also just the second time in Bucs history that a player had gone over the 1,000 yard receiving mark in back-to-back seasons (Keyshawn Johnson was the first).

In 2007, he played in 15 games, making 57 receptions for 1,014 yards and six touchdowns, becoming the first player in franchise history to register three consecutive 1,000-yard receiving seasons. After starting the first two games, he suffered a foot injury that forced him to miss most of 2008 season (played in 9 games), finishing with only 13 receptions for 138 yards. He was released on February 25, 2009. He finished his career with the Buccaneers with 248 receptions for 3,912 yards and 28 touchdowns.

=== New England Patriots ===
Galloway signed a one-year deal with the New England Patriots on March 14, 2009, as a free agent. Although healthy, he was inactive for Weeks 4-6 of the 2009 season due to a lack of production and difficulty in learning the Patriots offense. He was released on October 20.

=== Pittsburgh Steelers ===
On December 22, 2009, Galloway was signed as a free agent by the Pittsburgh Steelers after wide receiver Limas Sweed was placed on the Reserve/Non-Football Illness list. He was not re-signed by the Steelers at the end of the season.

=== Washington Redskins ===
Galloway signed with the Washington Redskins on April 28, 2010. He was waived by the team on November 27 and wide receiver Terrence Austin was promoted from the practice squad to replace him. He had 12 catches for 173 yards in 10 games.

== NFL career statistics ==
Year	Team	GP	Receiving						Punt returns						Fumbles	
Year	Team	GP	Rec	Yds	Avg	Lng	TD	FD	Ret	Yds	Avg	Lng	TD	FC	Fum	Lost
1995	SEA	14	67	1,039	15.5	59	7	66	36	360	10.0	89	1	12	1	1
1996	SEA	15	57	987	17.3	65	7	42	15	158	10.5	88	1	5	2	2
1997	SEA	15	72	1,049	14.6	53	12	55	—	—	—	—	—	—	0	0
1998	SEA	16	65	1,047	16.1	81	12	46	25	251	10.0	74	2	5	1	1
1999	SEA	8	22	335	15	48	1	17	3	54	18.0	21	0	0	0	0
2000	DAL	1	4	62	15.5	22	1	4	1	2	2.0	2	0	0	0	0
2001	DAL	16	52	699	13.4	47	3	53	1	6	6.0	6	0	0	1	0
2002	DAL	16	61	908	14.9	80	6	33	15	181	12.1	71	0	8	1	1
2003	DAL	15	34	672	19.8	64	2	2	20	178	8.9	36	0	6	0	0
2004	TB	10	33	416	15.6	36	5	25	20	142	7.1	59	1	8	0	0
2005	TB	16	83	1,287	15.5	80	10	57	—	—	—	—	—	—	0	0
2006	TB	16	62	1,057	17.0	64	7	44	2	3	1.5	2	0	0	0	0
2007	TB	15	57	1,043	17.8	69	6	37	3	14	4.7	10	0	0	1	0
2008	TB	9	13	168	10.6	22	0	6	—	—	—	—	—	—	0	0
2009	NE	3	7	68	9.6	19	0	3	—	—	—	—	—	—	0	0
2009	PIT	0	DNP													
2010	WAS	10	12	173	14.4	62	0	9	—	—	—	—	—	—	0	0
Career		198	701	10,950	15.6	81	77	484	141	1,349	9.6	89	5	44	7	5

== Post-football career ==
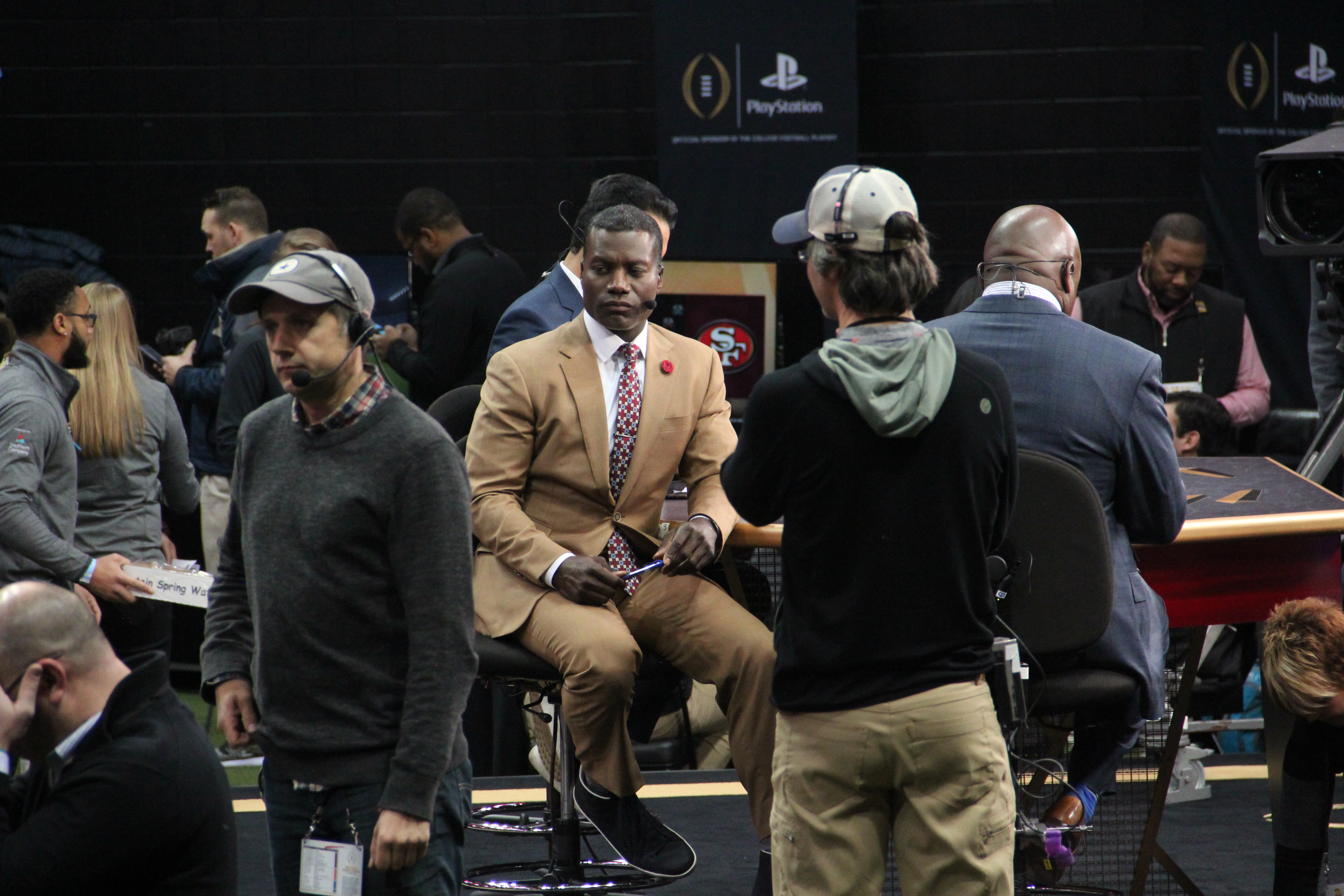
Galloway working with ESPN in 2018

In 2012, Galloway joined ESPN as a college football analyst. During his playing career, Galloway co-owned the Columbus Destroyers of the Arena Football League from 2003 to 2008.
