= Darryl Williams (safety) =

American football player (born 1970)

No. 31, 33
- Position: Safety

Personal information
- Born: January 8, 1970 (age 56); Miami, Florida, U.S.
- Listed height: 6 ft 0 in (1.83 m)
- Listed weight: 205 lb (93 kg)

Career information
- High school: American (Hialeah, Florida)
- College: Miami (FL)
- NFL draft: 1992: 1st round, 28th overall pick

Career history

Playing
- Cincinnati Bengals (1992–1995); Seattle Seahawks (1996–1999); Cincinnati Bengals (2000–2001)

Coaching
- St. Thomas Aquinas (FL) (2012–present) Safeties

Awards and highlights
- Second-team All-Pro (1997); Pro Bowl (1997); Consensus All-American (1991); AP national championship (1991)

Career NFL statistics
- Tackles: 884
- Sacks: 9.5
- Forced fumbles: 10
- Fumble recoveries: 15
- Interceptions: 31
- Defensive touchdowns: 4
- Stats at Pro Football Reference

Darryl Edwin Williams (born January 8, 1970) is an American former professional football player who was a safety in the National Football League (NFL) for ten seasons during the 1990s and early 2000s. He played college football for the Miami Hurricanes, was recognized as an All-American, and was a member of two national championship teams. He was drafted by the Cincinnati Bengals in the first round of the 1992 NFL draft, and played professionally for the Bengals and the Seattle Seahawks.

== Early life ==
Williams was born in Miami, Florida. He attended American High School in Miami-Dade County, Florida, and played for the American Patriots high school football team.

== College career ==
Williams received an athletic scholarship to attend the University of Miami in Coral Gables, Florida, where he played for coach Jimmy Johnson and coach Dennis Erickson's Hurricanes teams from 1988 to 1991. He was a member of the Hurricanes' national championship teams in 1989 and 1991, and was recognized as a consensus first-team All-American in 1991.

== Professional career ==
=== Cincinnati Bengals ===
The Cincinnati Bengals selected Williams in the first round of the 1992 NFL draft, with the 28th pick overall. He played for the Bengals from 1992 to 1995. During his first four seasons with the team he started 60 of 64 games in which he played, recording 402 tackles, nine interceptions, and 6.5 quarterback sacks.

=== Seattle Seahawks ===
Williams joined the Seattle Seahawks in 1996. In his second year with the team he made the Pro Bowl after recording 96 tackles and eight interceptions. Overall, he played four years for the Seahawks from 1996 to 1999 starting 60 of 61 games, recording 348 tackles and 20 interceptions. He was released by the Seahawks after the 1999 season.

=== Cincinnati Bengals (second stint) ===
Williams re-signed with the Bengals before the 2000 season. He spent the next two years with the Bengals starting 17 of 31 games, recording 126 tackles, two interceptions, and 3.5 sacks.

After the 2001 season Williams retired after 10 years in the NFL. He finished his career starting 137 of 156 games, and recorded 876 tackles, 31 interceptions, and 9.5 sacks.

== NFL career statistics ==
General			Tackles				Fumbles			Interceptions					
Year	Team	GP	Comb	Solo	Ast	Sack	FF	FR	Yds	Int	Yds	Avg	Lng	TD	PD
1992	CIN	16	0	0	0	2.0	0	1	0	4	65	16	30	0	0
1993	CIN	16	124	95	29	2.0	1	2	0	2	126	63	97	1	11
1994	CIN	16	99	85	14	1.0	2	2	0	2	45	23	33	0	8
1995	CIN	16	101	78	23	1.0	0	3	0	1	1	1	1	0	9
1996	SEA	16	80	67	13	0.0	0	1	0	5	148	30	79	1	11
1997	SEA	16	92	67	25	0.0	1	1	0	8	172	22	44	1	13
1998	SEA	16	96	68	28	0.0	3	3	0	3	41	14	28	0	11
1999	SEA	13	80	63	17	0.0	0	1	0	4	41	10	21	0	12
2000	CIN	16	98	77	21	0.0	3	0	0	1	36	36	36	1	4
2001	CIN	15	28	21	7	3.5	1	1	0	1	16	16	16	0	2
Career		156	798	621	177	9.5	11	15	0	31	691	22	97	4	81

== See also ==
- 1991 College Football All-America Team
- List of University of Miami alumni
- Miami Hurricanes
- Most consecutive starts by a free safety
