= Brett Williams (defensive end) =

American football defensive end

Profile
- Position: Defensive end

Personal information
- Born: October 15, 1973 (age 53)
- Listed height: 6 ft 5 in (1.96 m)
- Listed weight: 270 lb (122 kg)

Career information
- High school: Dougherty (Albany, Georgia)
- College: Clemson

Brett Williams (born October 15, 1973) is a former defensive end for the Los Angeles Xtreme of the XFL.
