= Deems May =

American football player (born 1969)

No. 88
- Position: Tight end

Personal information
- Born: March 6, 1969 (age 57); Lexington, North Carolina, U.S.
- Listed height: 6 ft 4 in (1.93 m)
- Listed weight: 263 lb (119 kg)

Career information
- High school: Lexington (NC)
- College: North Carolina (1988–1991)
- NFL draft: 1992: 7th round, 174th overall pick

Career history
- San Diego Chargers (1992–1996); Seattle Seahawks (1997–1999)

Career NFL statistics
- Receptions: 26
- Receiving yards: 238
- Touchdowns: 1
- Stats at Pro Football Reference

Bert Deems May (born March 6, 1969) is an American former professional football player who was a tight end for eight seasons in the National Football League (NFL). He played for the San Diego Chargers from 1992 to 1996 and for the Seattle Seahawks from 1997 to 1999. He played college football for the North Carolina Tar Heels and was selected by the Chargers in the seventh round of the 1992 NFL draft with the 174th overall pick.
