= Michael Sinclair (American football) =

American gridiron football player and coach (born 1968)

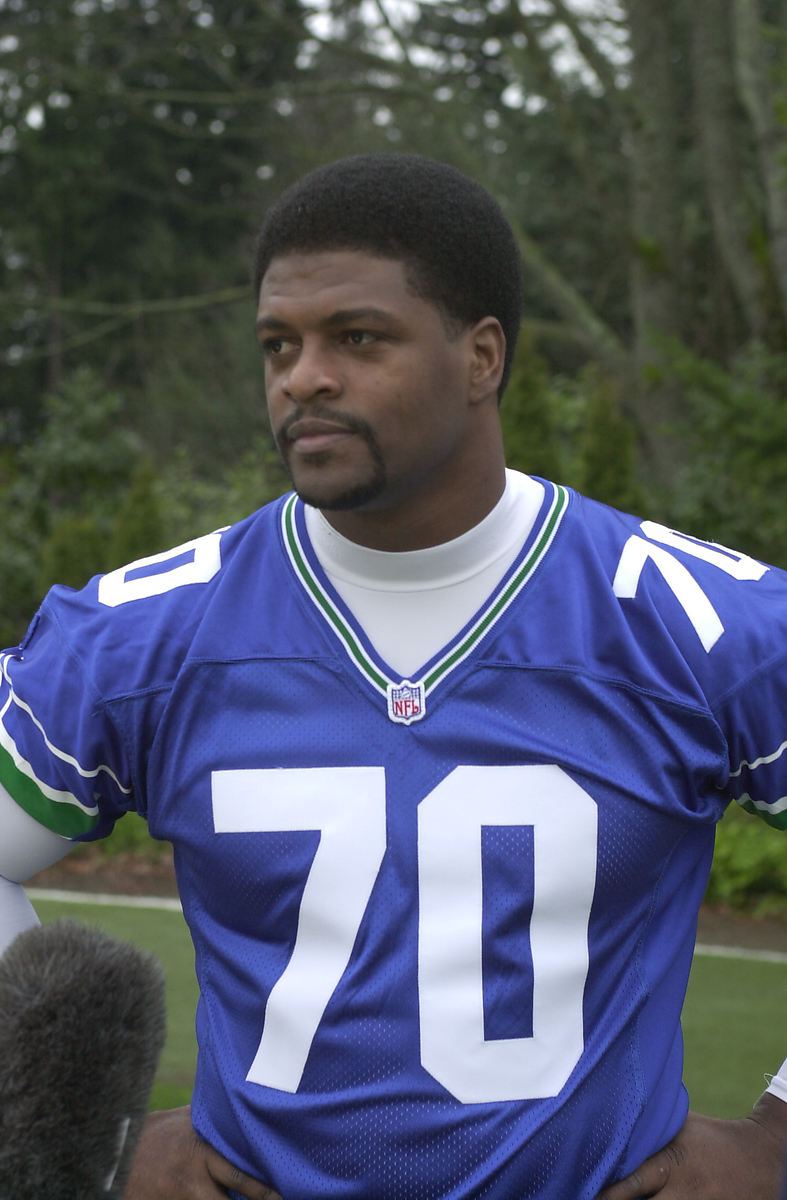
- Sinclair in 2002

No. 70, 75
- Position: Defensive end

Personal information
- Born: January 31, 1968 (age 58); Galveston, Texas, U.S.
- Listed height: 6 ft 4 in (1.93 m)
- Listed weight: 267 lb (121 kg)

Career information
- High school: Beaumont Charlton-Pollard (Beaumont, Texas)
- College: Eastern New Mexico
- NFL draft: 1991: 6th round, 155th overall pick

Career history

Playing
- Seattle Seahawks (1991–2001); → Sacramento Surge (1992); Denver Broncos (2002)*; Philadelphia Eagles (2002)
- * Offseason or practice squad member only

Coaching
- Hamburg Sea Devils (2007) Defensive line coach; Montreal Alouettes (2008–2012) Defensive line coach; Saskatchewan Roughriders (2013) Assistant head coach & defensive line coach; Chicago Bears (2013) Defensive line coach

Awards and highlights
- One of 2 players from D2 schools to lead the NFL in sacks since they were recorded...Johnny Randle 1996-Michael Sinclair 1997...: Second-team All-Pro (1998); 3× Pro Bowl (1996–1998; NFL sacks leader (1998); NFL forced fumbles leader (1998); Seattle Seahawks 35th Anniversary team; Seattle Seahawks Top 50 players; As a coach: World Bowl champion (XV); 2× Grey Cup champion (2009, 2010)

Career NFL statistics
- Tackles: 351
- Sacks: 73.5
- Forced fumbles: 25
- Fumble recoveries: 9
- Pass deflections: 2
- Defensive touchdowns: 2
- Stats at Pro Football Reference

Michael Glenn Sinclair (born January 31, 1968) is an American former professional football player and coach. He played as a defensive end for 11 seasons in the National Football League (NFL) with the Seattle Seahawks and the Philadelphia Eagles. He was selected in the sixth round of the 1991 NFL draft by the Seahawks. Sinclair was a three-time Pro Bowler in 1996, 1997 and 1998. He led the NFL in sacks in 1998 with 16.5, which is also the Seahawks single-season franchise record.

After his playing career, Sinclair won the World Bowl as the defensive line coach for the Hamburg Sea Devils in NFL Europa in 2007. He was named the defensive line coach for the Montreal Alouettes in January 2008, where he spent five seasons and won two Grey Cup championships. On January 18, 2013, Sinclair followed Alouettes head coach Marc Trestman to the Chicago Bears. Sinclair was fired on January 25, 2014.

== Honors ==
- 1990 AP Little All-American Team
- Lone Star conference best NFL Players Team
- Eastern New Mexico Hall OF
- CBS greatest draft picks of the modern NFL #155
- 4 greatest-value NFL Draft picks in Seattle Seahawks history
- 1998 NFL defensive player of the year finalist
- Seahawks All-time Goat Team
- NFL ranked 43rd All-time (forced fumbles)
- Most sacks of any member of the entire 1991 draft class
- Sacked John Elway more than any other player
- Sports Illustrated NFL Mid-season 1st Team
- Seahawks Top Ten Defensive Players of All-time
- Seahawks All-time Team
