= 1992 Houston Oilers season =

33rd season in franchise history

- Owner: Bud Adams
- General manager: Mike Holovak
- Head coach: Jack Pardee
- Offensive coordinator: Kevin Gilbride
- Defensive coordinator: Jim Eddy
- Home stadium: Houston Astrodome

Results
- Record: 10–6
- Division place: 2nd AFC Central
- Playoffs: Lost Wild Card Playoffs (at Bills) 38–41 (OT)
- All-Pros: WR Haywood Jeffires
- Pro Bowlers: QB Warren Moon; RB Lorenzo White; WR Haywood Jeffires

Uniform
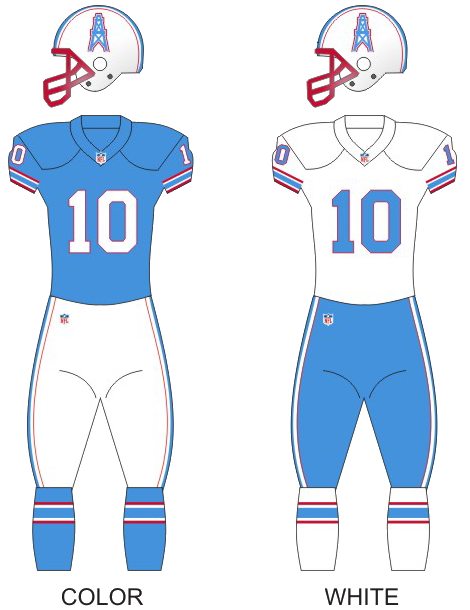

The 1992 Houston Oilers season was the team's 33rd season and their 23rd in the National Football League (NFL).

The Oilers reached the playoffs for the 6th consecutive season, which was the longest such streak in the NFL at the time. (They would extend that to seven straight playoff appearances the following season). During their 1992 season, Houston finished the season 10–6, good enough for 2nd place in the AFC Central. However, in the postseason, the Oilers would fall on the losing end of what would become one of the most substantial come from behind victories in NFL history, dropping a 35–3 lead in the Wild Card game against Buffalo to lose by a score of 41–38. As noted, the Buffalo Bills victory in this game was deemed the greatest comeback in NFL history before the Minnesota Vikings' victory over the Indianapolis Colts surpassed it in 2022, and is referred to as "The Comeback" (or by then-Oiler fans, "The Choke").

With the Oilers' home stadium, the Astrodome, hosting the 1992 Republican National Convention; the Oilers would find themselves having to play all of their pre-season games on the road.

== Offseason ==
Additions	Subtractions
WR Webster Slaughter (Browns)	WR Drew Hill (Falcons)
	RB Allen Pinkett (Saints)
	LB Eric Fairs (Bills)
	T Dean Steinkuhler

=== NFL draft ===
1992 Houston Oilers draft
Round	Pick	Player	Position	College	Notes
2	50	Eddie Robinson	Linebacker	Alabama State	
3	77	Corey Harris	Wide receiver	Vanderbilt	
4	108	Mike Mooney	Offensive tackle	Georgia Tech	
5	133	Joe Bowden	Linebacker	Oklahoma	
5	135	Tony Brown	Cornerback	Fresno State	
5	136	Tim Roberts	Defensive tackle	Southern Miss	
6	162	Mario Bailey	Wide receiver	Washington	
7	189	Elbert Turner	Wide receiver	Illinois	
8	220	Bucky Richardson	Quarterback	Texas A&M	
9	247	Bernard Dafney	Offensive tackle	Tennessee	
10	274	Dion Johnson	Wide receiver	East Carolina	
11	301	Anthony Davis	Linebacker	Utah	
12	332	Joe Wood	Placekicker	Air Force	
Made roster

=== Undrafted free agents ===
1992 undrafted free agents of note
Player	Position	College
Reggie Brown	Wide receiver	Alabama State
Wade Hopkins	Wide receiver	Southwest Baptist
Derrick Ned	Running back	Grambling State

== Personnel ==
=== Staff ===
1992 Houston Oilers staff
Front office: Owner/Chairman of the Board/President – Bud Adams; Executive Vice President/General Manager – Mike Holovak; Assistant General Manager – Floyd Reese; Head coaches: Head Coach – Jack Pardee; Offensive coaches: Offensive Coordinator – Kevin Gilbride; Running Backs – Frank Novak; Receivers – Chris Palmer; Offensive Line – Bob Young; Assistant Offensive Line – Richard Smith	Defensive coaches: Defensive Coordinator – Jim Eddy; Defensive Line – Jim Stanley; Linebackers – Frank Bush; Defensive Backs – Pat Thomas; Quality Control – Gregg Williams; Special teams coaches: Special Teams – Richard Smith; Strength and conditioning: Strength and Rehabilitation – Steve Watterson

=== Roster ===
1992 Houston Oilers roster
Quarterbacks (QB): 14 Cody Carlson; 6 Mike Elkins; 1 Warren Moon; 7 Bucky Richardson; Running backs (RB): 33 Gary Brown; 32 Spencer Tillman KR; 44 Lorenzo White; Wide receivers (WR): 87 Pat Coleman; 80 Curtis Duncan; 81 Ernest Givins; 83 Leonard Harris; 84 Haywood Jeffires; 86 Damon Mays; 89 Webster Slaughter PR; 88 Gary Wellman; Tight ends (TE)	Offensive linemen (OL): 66 Doug Dawson G; 77 Kevin Donnalley T; 55 John Flannery G; 78 Don Maggs T; 74 Bruce Matthews C; 63 Mike Munchak G; 64 Erik Norgard C; 73 David Williams T; Defensive linemen (DL): 76 Jeff Alm DT; 79 Ray Childress DT; 95 William Fuller DE; 96 Sean Jones DE; 94 Glenn Montgomery DT; 68 Tim Roberts DT; 97 Lee Williams DE/DT	Linebackers (LB): 59 Joe Bowden OLB; 93 Rick Graf OLB; 56 Scott Kozak OLB; 50 Eddie Robinson OLB; 53 Eugene Seale MLB; 54 Al Smith MLB; Defensive backs (DB): 22 Tony Brown CB; 28 Cris Dishman CB; 38 Mike Dumas FS; 21 Jerry Gray CB; 24 Steve Jackson CB; 29 Darryll Lewis CB; 25 Bubba McDowell SS; 26 Bo Orlando FS; 31 Marcus Robertson FS; Special teams (ST): 3 Al Del Greco K; 9 Greg Montgomery P	Practice squad: 82 Mario Bailey WR; 17 Reggie Brown WR; 19 Joe Campbell WR; 67 Mike Gisler C; 78 LeRoy Truitt G; Reserve: 57 Lamar Lathon LB (IR); 99 Doug Smith DT (IR); 47 active, 2 inactive, 5 practice squad Rookies in italics

== Regular season ==
=== Schedule ===
Week	Date	Opponent	Result	Record	Venue	Attendance
1	September 6	**Pittsburgh Steelers**	**L** 24–29	0–1	Astrodome	63,713
2	September 13	at Indianapolis Colts	**W** 20–10	1–1	Hoosier Dome	44,851
3	September 20	Kansas City Chiefs	**W** 23–20 (OT)	2–1	Astrodome	60,955
4	September 27	San Diego Chargers	**W** 27–0	3–1	Astrodome	57,491
5	Bye					
6	October 11	at **Cincinnati Bengals**	**W** 38–24	4–1	Riverfront Stadium	54,254
7	October 18	at Denver Broncos	**L** 21–27	4–2	Mile High Stadium	74,827
8	October 25	**Cincinnati Bengals**	**W** 26–10	5–2	Astrodome	58,701
9	November 1	at **Pittsburgh Steelers**	**L** 20–21	5–3	Three Rivers Stadium	58,074
10	November 8	**Cleveland Browns**	**L** 14–24	5–4	Astrodome	57,348
11	November 15	at Minnesota Vikings	**W** 17–13	6–4	Hubert H. Humphrey Metrodome	56,726
12	November 22	at Miami Dolphins	**L** 16–19	6–5	Joe Robbie Stadium	63,597
13	November 26	at Detroit Lions	**W** 24–21	7–5	Pontiac Silverdome	73,711
14	December 7	Chicago Bears	**W** 24–7	8–5	Astrodome	62,193
15	December 13	Green Bay Packers	**L** 14–16	8–6	Astrodome	57,285
16	December 20	at **Cleveland Browns**	**W** 17–14	9–6	Cleveland Municipal Stadium	59,898
17	December 27	Buffalo Bills	**W** 27–3	10–6	Astrodome	61,742
Note: Intra-division opponents are in **bold** text.

=== Game summaries ===
==== Week One: vs. Pittsburgh Steelers ====
Week One: Pittsburgh Steelers at Houston Oilers – Game summary

Quarter	1	2	3	4	Total
**Steelers**	7	9	6	7	**29**
Oilers	14	10	0	0	**24**

at Astrodome, Houston, Texas

- Date: September 6
- Game time: 12:00 p.m. CDT
- Game weather: None (played indoors)
- Game attendance: 63,713
- Referee: Gary Lane
- TV announcers (NBC): Charlie Jones and Todd Christensen
- Box score

Game information

**First quarter**

- HOU – Johnny Meads 15-yard fumble return (Al Del Greco kick). Oilers 7–0.
- HOU – Ernest Givens 11-yard pass from Warren Moon (Al Del Greco kick). Oilers 14–0.
- PIT – Barry Foster 1-yard run (Gary Anderson kick). Oilers 14–7.

**Second quarter**

- PIT – Gary Anderson 30-yard field goal. Oilers 14–10.
- HOU – Al Del Greco 36-yard field goal. Oilers 17–10.
- PIT – Jeff Graham 26-yard pass from Neil O'Donnell (Gary Anderson kick). Oilers 17–16.
- HOU – Ernest Givens 8-yard pass from Warren Moon (Al Del Greco kick). Oilers 24–16.

**Third quarter**

- PIT – Gary Anderson 25-yard field goal. Oilers 24–19.
- PIT – Gary Anderson 37-yard field goal. Oilers 24–22.

**Fourth quarter**

- PIT – Adrian Cooper 9-yard pass from Neil O'Donnell (Gary Anderson kick). Steelers 29–24.

**Top passers**

- PIT – Neil O'Donnell – 14/23, 223 yards, 2 TD
- HOU – Warren Moon – 29/45, 330 yards, 2 TD, 5 INT

**Top rushers**

- PIT – Barry Foster – 26 rushes, 107 yards, TD
- HOU – Lorenzo White – 13 rushes, 100 yards

**Top receivers**

- PIT – Jeff Graham – 7 receptions, 89 yards, TD
- HOU – Haywood Jeffires – 7 receptions, 117 yards

==== Week Two: at Indianapolis Colts ====
Week Two: Houston Oilers at Indianapolis Colts – Game summary

Quarter	1	2	3	4	Total
**Oilers**	7	3	7	3	**20**
Colts	0	3	0	7	**10**

at Hoosier Dome, Indianapolis, Indiana

- Date: September 13
- Game time: 3:00 p.m. CDT / 4:00 p.m. EDT
- Game weather: None (played indoors)
- Game attendance: 44,851
- TV announcers (NBC): Jim Lampley and Ahmad Rashad
- Box score

Game information

**First quarter**

- HOU – Lorenzo White 69-yard pass from Warren Moon (Al Del Greco kick). Oilers 7–0.

**Second quarter**

- IND – Dean Biasucci 37-yard field goal. Oilers 7–3.
- HOU – Al Del Greco 27-yard field goal. Oilers 10–3.

**Third quarter**

- HOU – Haywood Jeffires 2-yard pass from Warren Moon (Al Del Greco kick). Oilers 17–3.

**Fourth quarter**

- HOU – Al Del Greco 20-yard field goal. Oilers 20–3.
- IND – Anthony Johnson 3-yard pass from Tom Tupa (Dean Biasucci kick). Oilers 20–10.

**Top passers**

- HOU – Warren Moon – 29/39, 361 yards, 2 TD
- IND – Tom Tupa – 10/20, 92 yards, TD, INT

**Top rushers**

- HOU – Lorenzo White – 17 rushes, 69 yards
- IND – Rodney Culver – 17 rushes, 45 yards

**Top receivers**

- HOU – Lorenzo White – 4 receptions, 106 yards, TD
- IND – Bill Brooks – 5 receptions, 61 yards

==== Week Three: vs. Kansas City Chiefs ====
Week Three: Kansas City Chiefs at Houston Oilers – Game summary

Quarter	1	2	3	4	OT	Total
Chiefs	3	10	0	7	0	**20**
**Oilers**	3	3	0	14	3	**23**

at Astrodome, Houston, Texas

- Date: September 20
- Game time: 12:00 p.m. CDT
- Game weather: None (played indoors)
- Game attendance: 60,955
- Referee: Dale Hamer
- TV announcers (NBC): Don Criqui and Paul Maguire
- Box score

Game information

**First quarter**

- KC – Nick Lowery 31-yard field goal. Chiefs 3–0.
- HOU – Al Del Greco 21-yard field goal. Tied 3–3.

**Second quarter**

- KC – Nick Lowery 52-yard field goal. Chiefs 6–3.
- KC – Todd McNair 5-yard pass from Dave Krieg (Nick Lowery kick). Chiefs 13–3.
- HOU – Al Del Greco 54-yard field goal. Chiefs 13–6.

**Third quarter**

- No scoring plays

**Fourth quarter**

- HOU – Leonard Harris 8-yard pass from Warren Moon (Al Del Greco kick). Tied 13–13.
- HOU – Ernest Givens 21-yard pass from Warren Moon (Al Del Greco kick). Oilers 20–13.
- KC – Todd McNair 4-yard run (Nick Lowery kick). Tied 20–20.

**Overtime**

- HOU – Al Del Greco 39-yard field goal. Oilers 23–20.

**Top passers**

- KC – Dave Krieg – 17/30, 177 yards, TD
- HOU – Warren Moon – 19/28, 279 yards, 2 TD, 2 INT

**Top rushers**

- KC – Barry Word – 22 rushes, 114 yards
- HOU – Lorenzo White – 17 rushes, 72 yards

**Top receivers**

- KC – J. J. Birden – 6 receptions, 77 yards
- HOU – Haywood Jeffires – 6 receptions, 84 yards

==== Week Four: vs. San Diego Chargers ====
Week Four: San Diego Chargers at Houston Oilers – Game summary

Quarter	1	2	3	4	Total
Chargers	0	0	0	0	**0**
**Oilers**	10	0	7	10	**27**

at Astrodome, Houston, Texas

- Date: September 27
- Game time: 12:00 p.m. CDT
- Game weather: None (played indoors)
- Game attendance: 57,491
- Referee: Gerald Austin
- TV announcers (NBC): Joel Myers and Dan Hampton
- Box score

Game information

**First quarter**

- HOU – Haywood Jeffires 3-yard pass from Warren Moon (Al Del Greco kick). Oilers 7–0.
- HOU – Al Del Greco 49-yard field goal. Oilers 10–0.

**Second quarter**

- No scoring plays

**Third quarter**

- HOU – Lorenzo White 5-yard run (Al Del Greco kick). Oilers 17–0.

**Fourth quarter**

- HOU – Warren Moon 5-yard run (Al Del Greco kick). Oilers 24–0.
- HOU – Al Del Greco 46-yard field goal. Oilers 27–0.

**Top passers**

- SD – Stan Humphries – 22/38, 219 yards, 3 INT
- HOU – Warren Moon – 17/28, 175 yards, TD

**Top rushers**

- SD – Rod Bernstine – 9 rushes, 22 yards
- HOU – Lorenzo White – 15 rushes, 63 yards, TD

**Top receivers**

- SD – Ronnie Harmon – 4 receptions, 78 yards
- HOU – Haywood Jeffires – 10 receptions, 77 yards, TD

==== Week Six: at Cincinnati Bengals ====
Week Six: Houston Oilers at Cincinnati Bengals – Game summary

Quarter	1	2	3	4	Total
**Oilers**	10	14	14	0	**38**
Bengals	0	10	7	7	**24**

at Riverfront Stadium, Cincinnati, Ohio

- Date: October 11
- Game time: 3:00 p.m. CDT / 4:00 p.m. EDT
- Game weather: Cloudy, 50 °F (10 °C)
- Game attendance: 54,254
- TV announcers (NBC): Charlie Jones and Todd Christensen
- Box score

Game information

**First quarter**

- HOU – Al Del Greco 39-yard field goal. Oilers 3–0.
- HOU – Haywood Jeffires 8-yard pass from Warren Moon (Al Del Greco kick). Oilers 10–0.

**Second quarter**

- HOU – Ernest Givens 2-yard pass from Warren Moon (Al Del Greco kick). Oilers 17–0.
- HOU – Haywood Jeffires 14-yard pass from Warren Moon (Al Del Greco kick). Oilers 24–0.
- CIN – Tim McGee 21-yard pass from Boomer Esiason (Jim Breech kick). Oilers 24–7.
- CIN – Jim Breech 29-yard field goal. Oilers 24–10.

**Third quarter**

- HOU – Ernest Givens 7-yard pass from Warren Moon (Al Del Greco kick). Oilers 31–10.
- HOU – Haywood Jeffires 3-yard pass from Warren Moon (Al Del Greco kick). Oilers 38–10.
- CIN – Tim McGee 26-yard pass from Boomer Esiason (Jim Breech kick). Oilers 38–17.

**Fourth quarter**

- CIN – Milt Stegall 12-yard pass from Donald Hollas (Jim Breech kick). Oilers 38–24.

**Top passers**

- HOU – Warren Moon – 21/32, 216 yards, 5 TD, 2 INT
- CIN – Boomer Esiason – 12/25, 151 yards, 2 TD, 2 INT

**Top rushers**

- HOU – Lorenzo White – 25 rushes, 149 yards
- CIN – Derrick Fenner – 3 rushes, 39 yards

**Top receivers**

- HOU – Haywood Jeffires – 9 receptions, 82 yards, 3 TD
- CIN – Brian Brennan – 7 receptions, 69 yards

==== Week Seven: at Denver Broncos ====
Week Seven: Houston Oilers at Denver Broncos – Game summary

Quarter	1	2	3	4	Total
Oilers	7	0	7	7	**21**
**Broncos**	0	10	7	10	**27**

at Mile High Stadium, Denver, Colorado

- Date: October 18
- Game time: 3:00 p.m. CDT / 2:00 p.m. MDT
- Game weather: Sunny, 47 °F (8 °C)
- Game attendance: 75,804
- TV announcers (NBC): Charlie Jones and Todd Christensen
- Box score

Game information

**First quarter**

- HOU – Ernest Givens 8-yard pass from Warren Moon (Al Del Greco kick). Oilers 7–0.

**Second quarter**

- DEN – David Treadwell 45-yard field goal. Oilers 7–3.
- DEN – Gaston Green 67-yard run (David Treadwell kick). Broncos 10–7.

**Third quarter**

- HOU – Lorenzo White 3-yard run (Al Del Greco kick). Oilers 14–10.
- DEN – Mark Jackson 42-yard pass from John Elway (David Treadwell kick). Broncos 17–14.

**Fourth quarter**

- DEN – David Treadwell 28-yard field goal. Broncos 20–14.
- HOU – Haywood Jeffires 7-yard pass from Warren Moon (Al Del Greco kick). Oilers 21–20.
- DEN – Reggie Rivers 20-yard run (David Treadwell kick). Broncos 27–21.

**Top passers**

- HOU – Warren Moon – 23/39, 321 yards, 2 TD, INT
- DEN – John Elway – 13/21, 192 yards, TD

**Top rushers**

- HOU – Lorenzo White – 15 rushes, 70 yards, TD
- DEN – Gaston Green – 8 rushes, 98 yards, TD

**Top receivers**

- HOU – Curtis Duncan – 5 receptions, 133 yards
- DEN – Mark Jackson – 3 receptions, 90 yards, TD

==== Week Eight: vs. Cincinnati Bengals ====
Week Eight: Cincinnati Bengals at Houston Oilers – Game summary

Quarter	1	2	3	4	Total
Bengals	0	10	0	0	**10**
**Oilers**	7	3	7	9	**26**

at Astrodome, Houston, Texas

- Date: October 25
- Game time: 12:00 p.m. CST / 1:00 p.m. EST
- Game weather: None (played indoors)
- Game attendance: 58,701
- TV announcers (NBC): Don Criqui and Paul Maguire
- Box score

Game information

**First quarter**

- HOU – Ernest Givens 30-yard pass from Warren Moon (Al Del Greco kick). Oilers 7–0.

**Second quarter**

- CIN – Brian Brennan 17-yard pass from Boomer Esiason (Jim Breech kick). Tied 7–7.
- HOU – Al Del Greco 27-yard field goal. Oilers 10–7.
- CIN – Jim Breech 24-yard field goal. Tied 10–10.

**Third quarter**

- HOU – Lorenzo White 1-yard run (Al Del Greco kick). Oilers 17–10.

**Fourth quarter**

- HOU – Webster Slaughter 36-yard pass from Warren Moon (Al Del Greco kick). Oilers 24–10.
- HOU – Boomer Esiason run out of own end zone. Oilers 26–10.

**Top passers**

- CIN – Boomer Esiason – 13/19, 139 yards, TD, INT
- HOU – Warren Moon – 27/40, 342 yards, 2 TD, INT

**Top rushers**

- CIN – Harold Green – 11 rushes, 38 yards
- HOU – Lorenzo White – 17 rushes, 59 yards, TD

**Top receivers**

- CIN – Carl Pickens – 2 receptions, 47 yards
- HOU – Ernest Givens – 8 receptions, 100 yards, TD

==== Week Nine: at Pittsburgh Steelers ====
Week Nine: Houston Oilers at Pittsburgh Steelers – Game summary

Quarter	1	2	3	4	Total
Oilers	3	3	14	0	**20**
**Steelers**	0	7	0	14	**21**

at Three Rivers Stadium, Pittsburgh, Pennsylvania

- Date: November 1
- Game time: 12:00 p.m. CST / 1:00 p.m. EST
- Game weather: Light rain, 47 °F (8 °C)
- Game attendance: 58,074
- Referee: Ed Hochuli
- TV announcers (NBC): Marv Albert and Bill Parcells
- Box score

Game information

**First quarter**

- HOU – Al Del Greco 29-yard field goal. Oilers 3–0.

**Second quarter**

- HOU – Al Del Greco 19-yard field goal. Oilers 6–0.
- PIT – Barry Foster 1-yard run (Gary Anderson kick). Steelers 7–6.

**Third quarter**

- HOU – Webster Slaughter 11-yard pass from Cody Carlson (Al Del Greco kick). Oilers 13–7.
- HOU – Ray Childress 8-yard fumble return (Al Del Greco kick). Oilers 20–7.

**Fourth quarter**

- PIT – Adrian Cooper 2-yard pass from Neil O'Donnell (Gary Anderson kick). Oilers 20–14.
- PIT – Eric Green 5-yard pass from Neil O'Donnell (Gary Anderson kick). Steelers 21–20.

**Top passers**

- HOU – Cody Carlson – 15/23, 137 yards, TD
- PIT – Neil O'Donnell – 14/22, 201 yards, 2 TD, INT

**Top rushers**

- HOU – Lorenzo White – 12 rushes, 44 yards
- PIT – Barry Foster – 31 rushes, 118 yards, TD

**Top receivers**

- HOU – Webster Slaughter – 5 receptions, 71 yards, TD
- PIT – Ernie Mills – 4 receptions, 61 yards

==== Week Ten: vs. Cleveland Browns ====
Week Ten: Cleveland Browns at Houston Oilers – Game summary

Quarter	1	2	3	4	Total
**Browns**	3	7	7	7	**24**
Oilers	0	0	0	14	**14**

at Astrodome, Houston, Texas

- Date: November 8
- Game time: 12:00 p.m. CST
- Game weather: None (played indoors)
- Game attendance: 57,348
- TV announcers (NBC): Don Criqui and Paul Maguire
- Box score

Game information

**First quarter**

- CLE – Matt Stover 44-yard field goal. Browns 3–0.

**Second quarter**

- CLE – Leroy Hoard 46-yard pass from Mike Tomczak (Matt Stover kick). Browns 10–0.

**Third quarter**

- CLE – Stevon Moore 73-yard fumble return (Matt Stover kick). Browns 17–0.

**Fourth quarter**

- HOU – Webster Slaughter 12-yard pass from Cody Carlson (Al Del Greco kick). Browns 17–7.
- CLE – Mark Bavaro 17-yard pass from Mike Tomczak (Matt Stover kick). Browns 24–7.
- HOU – Ernest Givens 18-yard pass from Cody Carlson (Al Del Greco kick). Browns 14–14.

**Top passers**

- CLE – Mike Tomczak – 17/26, 219 yards, 2 TD
- HOU – Cody Carlson – 9/11, 111 yards, 2 TD, INT

**Top rushers**

- CLE – Kevin Mack – 13 rushes, 39 yards
- HOU – Lorenzo White – 14 rushes, 76 yards

**Top receivers**

- CLE – Leroy Hoard – 2 receptions, 68 yards, TD
- HOU – Ernest Givens – 4 receptions, 50 yards, TD

==== Week Eleven: at Minnesota Vikings ====
Week Eleven: Houston Oilers at Minnesota Vikings – Game summary

Quarter	1	2	3	4	Total
**Oilers**	0	10	0	7	**17**
Vikings	0	10	0	3	**13**

at Hubert H. Humphrey Metrodome, Minneapolis, Minnesota

- Date: November 15
- Game time: 12:00 p.m. CST
- Game weather: None (played indoors)
- Game attendance: 56,726
- TV announcers (NBC): Dick Enberg and Bob Trumpy
- Box score

Game information

**First quarter**

- No scoring plays

**Second quarter**

- HOU – Al Del Greco 30-yard field goal. Oilers 3–0.
- MIN – Anthony Parker 58-yard fumble return (Fuad Reveiz kick). Vikings 7–3.
- MIN – Fuad Reveiz 42-yard field goal. Vikings 10–3.
- HOU – Ernest Givens 5-yard pass from Warren Moon (Al Del Greco kick). Tied 10–10.

**Third quarter**

- No scoring plays

**Fourth quarter**

- MIN – Fuad Reveiz 51-yard field goal. Vikings 13–10.
- HOU – Lorenzo White 1-yard run (Al Del Greco kick). Oilers 17–13.

**Top passers**

- HOU – Warren Moon – 28/38, 243 yards, TD, INT
- MIN – Rich Gannon – 9/28, 111 yards

**Top rushers**

- HOU – Lorenzo White – 18 rushes, 81 yards, TD
- MIN – Terry Allen – 13 rushes, 44 yards

**Top receivers**

- HOU – Ernest Givens – 8 receptions, 91 yards, TD
- MIN – Cris Carter – 3 receptions, 38 yards

==== Week Twelve: at Miami Dolphins ====
Week Twelve: Houston Oilers at Miami Dolphins – Game summary

Quarter	1	2	3	4	Total
Oilers	10	3	3	0	**16**
**Dolphins**	0	10	3	6	**19**

at Joe Robbie Stadium, Miami Gardens, Florida

- Date: November 22
- Game time: 12:00 p.m. CST / 1:00 p.m. EST
- Game weather: Cloudy, 79 °F (26 °C)
- Game attendance: 63,597
- TV announcers (NBC): Marv Albert and Bill Parcells
- Box score

Game information

**First quarter**

- HOU – Al Del Greco 24-yard field goal. Oilers 3–0.
- HOU – Haywood Jeffires 5-yard pass from Cody Carlson (Al Del Greco kick). Oilers 10–0.

**Second quarter**

- MIA – Pete Stoyanovich 38-yard field goal. Oilers 10–3.
- HOU – Al Del Greco 41-yard field goal. Oilers 13–3.
- MIA – Fred Banks 39-yard pass from Dan Marino (Pete Stoyanovich kick). Oilers 13–10.

**Third quarter**

- MIA – Pete Stoyanovich 40-yard field goal. Tied 13–13.
- HOU – Al Del Greco 23-yard field goal. Oilers 16–13.

**Fourth quarter**

- MIA – Pete Stoyanovich 29-yard field goal. Tied 16–16.
- MIA – Pete Stoyanovich 52-yard field goal. Dolphins 19–16.

**Top passers**

- HOU – Cody Carlson – 22/35, 228 yards, TD, 2 INT
- MIA – Dan Marino – 19/40, 237 yards, TD, INT

**Top rushers**

- HOU – Lorenzo White – 18 rushes, 69 yards
- MIA – Mark Higgs – 10 rushes, 35 yards

**Top receivers**

- HOU – Lorenzo White – 5 receptions, 64 yards
- MIA – Fred Banks – 4 receptions, 85 yards, TD

==== Week Thirteen: at Detroit Lions ====
NFL on Thanksgiving Day

Week Thirteen: Houston Oilers at Detroit Lions – Game summary

Quarter	1	2	3	4	Total
**Oilers**	0	3	7	14	**24**
Lions	0	7	7	7	**21**

at Pontiac Silverdome, Pontiac, Michigan

- Date: November 26
- Game time: 11:30 a.m. CST / 12:30 p.m. EST
- Game weather: None (played indoors)
- Game attendance: 73,711
- TV announcers (NBC): Dick Enberg and Bob Trumpy
- Box score

Game information

**First quarter**

- No scoring plays

**Second quarter**

- DET – Barry Sanders 1-yard run (Jason Hanson kick). Lions 7–0.
- HOU – Al Del Greco 30-yard field goal. Lions 7–3.

**Third quarter**

- HOU – William Fuller 10-yard fumble return (Al Del Greco kick). Oilers 10–7.
- DET – Herman Moore 77-yard pass from Erik Kramer (Jason Hanson kick). Lions 14–10.

**Fourth quarter**

- HOU – Haywood Jeffires 4-yard pass from Cody Carlson (Al Del Greco kick). Oilers 17–14.
- DET – Barry Sanders 8-yard pass from Erik Kramer (Jason Hanson kick). Lions 21–17.
- HOU – Lorenzo White 8-yard run (Al Del Greco kick). Oilers 24–21.

**Top passers**

- HOU – Cody Carlson – 24/33, 338 yards, TD, 2 INT
- DET – Erik Kramer – 12/21, 163 yards, 2 TD, 2 INT

**Top rushers**

- HOU – Lorenzo White – 15 rushes, 68 yards, TD
- DET – Barry Sanders – 22 rushes, 54 yards, TD

**Top receivers**

- HOU – Ernest Givens – 4 receptions, 100 yards
- DET – Herman Moore – 2 receptions, 88 yards, TD

==== Week Fourteen: vs. Chicago Bears ====
Week Fourteen: Chicago Bears at Houston Oilers – Game summary

Quarter	1	2	3	4	Total
Bears	0	0	0	7	**7**
**Oilers**	0	10	7	7	**24**

at Astrodome, Houston, Texas

- Date: December 7
- Game time: 8:00 p.m. CST
- Game weather: None (played indoors)
- Game attendance: 62,193
- TV announcers (ABC): Al Michaels, Frank Gifford, and Dan Dierdorf
- Box score

Game information

**First quarter**

- No scoring plays

**Second quarter**

- HOU – Al Del Greco 19-yard field goal. Oilers 3–0.
- HOU – Bubba McDowell 26-yard interception return (Al Del Greco kick). Oilers 10–0.

**Third quarter**

- HOU – Webster Slaughter 6-yard pass from Cody Carlson (Al Del Greco kick). Oilers 17–0.

**Fourth quarter**

- CHI – Neal Anderson 17-yard pass from Peter Tom Willis (Kevin Butler kick). Oilers 17–7.
- HOU – Lorenzo White 1-yard run (Al Del Greco kick). Oilers 24–7.

**Top passers**

- CHI – Peter Tom Willis – 11/24, 185 yards, TD, 2 INT
- HOU – Cody Carlson – 18/27, 178 yards, TD

**Top rushers**

- CHI – Brad Muster – 10 rushes, 54 yards
- HOU – Lorenzo White – 21 rushes, 116 yards, TD

**Top receivers**

- CHI – Anthony Morgan – 3 receptions, 94 yards
- HOU – Curtis Duncan – 8 receptions, 64 yards

==== Week Fifteen: vs. Green Bay Packers ====
Week Fifteen: Green Bay Packers at Houston Oilers – Game summary

Quarter	1	2	3	4	Total
**Packers**	0	3	6	7	**16**
Oilers	0	0	7	7	**14**

at Astrodome, Houston, Texas

- Date: December 13
- Game time: 7:00 p.m. CST
- Game weather: None (played indoors)
- Game attendance: 57,285
- TV announcers (ESPN): Mike Patrick and Joe Theismann
- Box score

Game information

**First quarter**

- No scoring plays

**Second quarter**

- GB – Chris Jacke 39-yard field goal. Packers 3–0.

**Third quarter**

- GB – Chris Jacke 36-yard field goal. Packers 6–0.
- GB – Chris Jacke 20-yard field goal. Packers 9–0.
- HOU – Cody Carlson 1-yard run (Al Del Greco kick). Packers 9–7.

**Fourth quarter**

- GB – Sterling Sharpe 6-yard pass from Brett Favre (Chris Jacke kick). Packers 16–7.
- HOU – Lorenzo White 2-yard run (Al Del Greco kick). Packers 16–14.

**Top passers**

- GB – Brett Favre – 19/30, 155 yards, TD, INT
- HOU – Cody Carlson – 25/36, 330 yards, 2 INT

**Top rushers**

- GB – Darrell Thompson – 15 rushes, 30 yards
- HOU – Lorenzo White – 15 rushes, 54 yards, TD

**Top receivers**

- GB – Sterling Sharpe – 6 receptions, 46 yards, TD
- HOU – Curtis Duncan – 6 receptions, 100 yards

==== Week Sixteen: at Cleveland Browns ====
Week Sixteen: Houston Oilers at Cleveland Browns – Game summary

Quarter	1	2	3	4	Total
**Oilers**	0	3	0	14	**17**
Browns	7	0	7	0	**14**

at Cleveland Municipal Stadium, Cleveland, Ohio

- Date: December 20
- Game time: 12:00 p.m. CST / 1:00 p.m. EST
- Game weather: Partly cloudy, 37 °F (3 °C)
- Game attendance: 59,898
- TV announcers (NBC): Tom Hammond and Cris Collinsworth
- Box score

Game information

**First quarter**

- CLE – Ron Wolfley 2-yard pass from Bernie Kosar (Matt Stover kick). Browns 7–0.

**Second quarter**

- HOU – Al Del Greco 47-yard field goal. Browns 7–3.

**Third quarter**

- CLE – James Jones 1-yard pass from Bernie Kosar (Matt Stover kick). Browns 14–3.

**Fourth quarter**

- HOU – Curtis Duncan 2-yard pass from Cody Carlson (Al Del Greco kick). Browns 14–10.
- HOU – Ernest Givens 3-yard pass from Cody Carlson (Al Del Greco kick). Oilers 17–14.

**Top passers**

- HOU – Cody Carlson – 19/34, 248 yards, 2 TD, 2 INT
- CLE – Bernie Kosar – 17/26, 140 yards, 2 TD, 3 INT

**Top rushers**

- HOU – Lorenzo White – 16 rushes, 70 yards
- CLE – Kevin Mack – 21 rushes, 95 yards

**Top receivers**

- HOU – Lorenzo White – 6 receptions, 105 yards
- CLE – Eric Metcalf – 3 receptions, 35 yards

==== Week Seventeen: vs. Buffalo Bills ====
Week Seventeen: Buffalo Bills at Houston Oilers – Game summary

Quarter	1	2	3	4	Total
Bills	3	0	0	0	**3**
**Oilers**	10	10	0	7	**27**

at Astrodome, Houston, Texas

- Date: December 27
- Game time: 7:00 p.m. CST
- Game weather: None (played indoors)
- Game attendance: 61,742
- Referee: Jerry Markbreit
- TV announcers (ESPN): Mike Patrick and Joe Theismann
- Box score

Game information

**First quarter**

- BUF – Steve Christie 40-yard field goal. Bills 3–0.
- HOU – Al Del Greco 28-yard field goal. Tied 3–3.
- HOU – Leonard Harris 13-yard pass from Cody Carlson (Al Del Greco kick). Oilers 10–3.

**Second quarter**

- HOU – Haywood Jeffires 17-yard pass from Warren Moon (Al Del Greco kick). Oilers 17–3.
- HOU – Al Del Greco 18-yard field goal. Oilers 20–3.

**Third quarter**

- No scoring plays

**Fourth quarter**

- HOU – Gary Brown 1-yard run (Al Del Greco kick). Oilers 27–3.

**Top passers**

- BUF – Frank Reich – 11/23, 99 yards, 2 INT
- HOU – Cody Carlson – 12/19, 105 yards, TD, INT

**Top rushers**

- BUF – Thurman Thomas – 18 rushes, 97 yards
- HOU – Lorenzo White – 17 rushes, 66 yards

**Top receivers**

- BUF – James Lofton – 6 receptions, 75 yards
- HOU – Haywood Jeffires – 6 receptions, 46 yards, TD

=== Standings ===
AFC Central
	W	L	T	PCT	DIV	CONF	PF	PA	STK
^{(1)} Pittsburgh Steelers	11	5	0	.688	5–1	10–2	299	225	W1
^{(5)} Houston Oilers	10	6	0	.625	3–3	7–5	352	258	W2
Cleveland Browns	7	9	0	.438	3–3	5–7	272	275	L3
Cincinnati Bengals	5	11	0	.313	1–5	4–8	274	364	L1

== Playoffs ==
=== AFC Wildcard: at (4) Buffalo Bills ===
AFC Wildcard Playoffs: (5) Houston Oilers at (4) Buffalo Bills – Game summary

Quarter	1	2	3	4	OT	Total
Oilers	7	21	7	3	0	38
Bills	3	0	28	7	3	41

at Rich Stadium, Orchard Park, New York

- Date: January 3, 1993
- Game time: 11:30 a.m. CST/12:30 p.m. EST
- Game weather: Cloudy, 34 °F (1 °C)
- Game attendance: 75,141
- Referee: Gerry Austin
- TV announcers (NBC): Charlie Jones and Todd Christensen
- Box score

Game information

First quarter

- HOU – Haywood Jeffires 3-yard pass from Warren Moon (Al Del Greco kick). Oilers 7–0.
- BUF – Steve Christie 36-yard field goal. Oilers 7–3.

Second quarter

- HOU – Webster Slaughter 7-yard pass from Warren Moon (Al Del Greco kick). Oilers 14–3.
- HOU – Curtis Duncan 26-yard pass from Warren Moon (Al Del Greco kick). Oilers 21–3.
- HOU – Haywood Jeffires 27-yard pass from Warren Moon (Al Del Greco kick). Oilers 28–3.

Third quarter

- HOU – Bubba McDowell 58-yard interception return (Al Del Greco kick). Oilers 35–3.
- BUF – Kenneth Davis 1-yard run (Steve Christie kick). Oilers 35–10.
- BUF – Don Beebe 38-yard pass from Frank Reich (Steve Christie kick). Oilers 35–17.
- BUF – Andre Reed 26-yard pass from Frank Reich (Steve Christie kick). Oilers 35–24.
- BUF – Andre Reed 18-yard pass from Frank Reich (Steve Christie kick). Oilers 35–31.

Fourth quarter

- BUF – Andre Reed 17-yard pass from Frank Reich (Steve Christie kick). Bills 38–35.
- HOU – Al Del Greco 26-yard field goal. Tied 38–38.

Overtime

- BUF – Steve Christie 32-yard field goal. Bills 41–38.

Top passers

- HOU – Warren Moon – 36/50, 371 yards, 4 TD, 2 INT
- BUF – Frank Reich – 21/34, 289 yards, 4 TD, INT

Top rushers

- HOU – Lorenzo White – 19 rushes, 75 yards
- BUF – Kenneth Davis – 13 rushes, 68 yards, TD

Top receivers

- HOU – Ernest Givens – 9 receptions, 117 yards
- BUF – Andre Reed – 8 receptions, 136 yards, 3 TD

The Oilers held a 35–3 lead on the Buffalo Bills. Bills backup quarterback Frank Reich led the Bills on a 38–3 run in the second half and overtime against the Oilers defense en route to a 41–38 overtime victory. The game was the largest comeback in NFL history, regular or postseason, until the 2022 Vikings erased a 33-0 gap to beat the Indianapolis Colts. Houston, whose 1992 team some believed gave them their best chance to win the Super Bowl, made several sweeping changes in the offseason.

Defensive coordinator Jim Eddy was fired shortly after the game. Oilers cornerback Cris Dishman called it "the biggest choke in history."

According to statistics site Football Outsiders, who does play-by-play analyses of each team each season, the Oilers were the best team in the AFC at the end of the 1992 season. "So if you are a Houston Oilers/Tennessee Titans fan," says the site, "who agonizes over the Frank Reich comeback game blowing your franchise's best shot at a Super Bowl title, well, here's another opportunity to feel sad."

== Awards and records ==
- Warren Moon, AFC Passing Leader (Passer Rating 89.3)
