= 1991 Houston Oilers season =

32nd season in franchise history

- Owner: Bud Adams
- General manager: Mike Holovak
- Head coach: Jack Pardee
- Offensive coordinator: Kevin Gilbride
- Defensive coordinator: Jim Eddy
- Home stadium: Houston Astrodome

Results
- Record: 11–5
- Division place: 1st AFC Central
- Playoffs: Won Wild Card Playoffs (vs. Jets) 17–10; Lost Divisional Playoffs (at Broncos) 24–26

Uniform
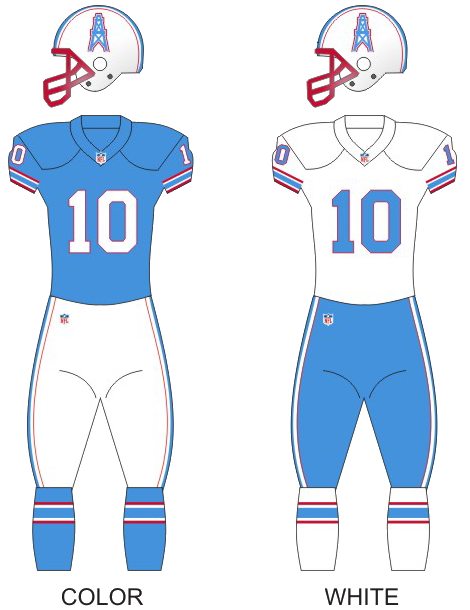

The 1991 Houston Oilers season was the 32nd season and their 22nd in the National Football League (NFL). Haywood Jeffires would become the second Oiler to have 100 receptions in a season. The first Oiler to accomplish the feat was Charley Hennigan in 1964. Jeffires would be the fifth receiver in NFL history to have a 100 reception season. The Oilers scored 386 points and gave up 251 points. The franchise earned its first division title since the AFL-NFL merger, having last won a division title in the 1967 American Football League season. The franchise finished the season with 11 wins compared to 5 losses and appeared twice on Monday Night Football.

== Offseason ==
=== NFL draft ===
1991 Houston Oilers draft
Round	Pick	Player	Position	College	Notes
2	28	Mike Dumas	Safety	Indiana	
2	38	Darryll Lewis *	Cornerback	Arizona	
2	44	John Flannery	Guard	Syracuse	
3	71	Steve Jackson	Cornerback	Purdue	
3	79	Kevin Donnalley	Guard	North Carolina	
4	101	David Rocker	Defensive tackle	Auburn	
4	102	Marcus Robertson *	Safety	Iowa State	
5	129	Gary Wellman	Wide receiver	USC	
7	183	Kyle Freeman	Linebacker	Angelo State	
8	214	Gary Brown	Running back	Penn State	
9	240	Shawn Jefferson	Wide receiver	Central Florida	
10	267	Curtis Moore	Linebacker	Kansas	
11	294	James Smith	Safety	Richmond	
12	325	Alex Johnson	Wide receiver	Miami (FL)	
Made roster * Made at least one Pro Bowl during career

=== Undrafted free agents ===
1991 undrafted free agents of note
Player	Position	College
Gary Hollingsworth	Quarterback	Alabama
Jon Reed	Wide receiver	Western Carolina
Ron Viaene	Defensive Tackle	Minnesota Duluth

== Personnel ==
=== Staff ===
1991 Houston Oilers staff
Front office: Owner/Chairman of the Board/President – Bud Adams; Executive Vice President/general manager – Mike Holovak; Assistant general manager – Floyd Reese; Head coaches: Head coach – Jack Pardee; Offensive coaches: Offensive coordinator – Kevin Gilbride; Running Backs – Frank Novak; Receivers – Chris Palmer; Offensive line – Bob Young	Defensive coaches: Defensive coordinator – Jim Eddy; Defensive line – Jim Stanley; Linebackers – Richard Smith; Defensive backs – Pat Thomas; Quality Control – Gregg Williams; Special teams coaches: Special teams – Richard Smith; Strength and conditioning: Strength and Rehabilitation – Steve Watterson

=== Roster ===
1991 Houston Oilers roster
Quarterbacks (QB): 14 Cody Carlson; 1 Warren Moon; 10 Reggie Slack; Running backs (RB): 33 Gary Brown; 30 Victor Jones; 20 Allen Pinkett KR; 44 Lorenzo White; Wide receivers (WR): 87 Pat Coleman; 80 Curtis Duncan; 81 Ernest Givins PR; 83 Leonard Harris; 85 Drew Hill; 84 Haywood Jeffires; 86 Alex Johnson; 82 Tony Jones; Tight ends (TE)	Offensive linemen (OL): 66 Doug Dawson G; 77 Kevin Donnalley G/T; 55 John Flannery C/G; 78 Don Maggs T; 74 Bruce Matthews C; 63 Mike Munchak G; 70 Dean Steinkuhler T; 73 David Williams T; Defensive linemen (DL): 76 Jeff Alm DT; 79 Ray Childress DT; 95 William Fuller DE; 90 Ezra Johnson DE; 96 Sean Jones DE; 94 Glenn Montgomery DT; 99 Doug Smith DT; 97 Lee Williams DE	Linebackers (LB): 51 Eric Fairs MLB; 56 Scott Kozak OLB; 57 Lamar Lathon OLB; 91 Johnny Meads OLB; 53 Eugene Seale MLB; 54 Al Smith MLB; Defensive backs (DB): 28 Cris Dishman CB; 38 Mike Dumas FS; 24 Steve Jackson CB; 23 Richard Johnson CB; 29 Darryll Lewis CB; 25 Bubba McDowell SS; 26 Bo Orlando FS; 31 Marcus Robertson CB/S; Special teams (ST): 3 Al Del Greco K; 9 Greg Montgomery P	Practice squad: 89 Frank Miotke WR; 88 Gary Wellman WR; Reserve: 93 Rick Graf LB (IR); 64 Erik Norgard C/G (IR); 72 Willis Peguese DE (IR); 47 active, 3 inactive, 2 practice squad Rookies in italics

== Preseason ==
Week	Date	Opponent	Result	Record	Venue	Attendance
1	August 3	at San Diego Chargers	L 29–31	0–1	Jack Murphy Stadium	43,042
2	August 9	Atlanta Falcons	L 7–36	0–2	Astrodome	52,140
3	August 18	Dallas Cowboys	W 30–20	1–2	Astrodome	53,314
4	August 22	vs. Los Angeles Rams	W 16–13	2–2	Liberty Bowl Memorial Stadium	63,200

== Regular season ==
=== Schedule ===
Week	Date	Opponent	Result	Record	Venue	Attendance
1	September 1	Los Angeles Raiders	**W** 47–17	1–0	Astrodome	61,367
2	September 8	at **Cincinnati Bengals**	**W** 30–7	2–0	Riverfront Stadium	56,463
3	September 16	Kansas City Chiefs	**W** 17–7	3–0	Astrodome	61,058
4	September 22	at New England Patriots	**L** 20–24	3–1	Foxboro Stadium	30,702
5	Bye					
6	October 6	Denver Broncos	**W** 42–14	4–1	Astrodome	59,145
7	October 13	at New York Jets	**W** 23–20	5–1	Giants Stadium	70,758
8	October 20	at Miami Dolphins	**W** 17–13	6–1	Joe Robbie Stadium	60,705
9	October 27	**Cincinnati Bengals**	**W** 35–3	7–1	Astrodome	58,634
10	November 3	at Washington Redskins	**L** 13–16 (OT)	7–2	RFK Stadium	55,096
11	November 10	Dallas Cowboys	**W** 26–23 (OT)	8–2	Astrodome	63,001
12	November 17	**Cleveland Browns**	**W** 28–24	9–2	Astrodome	58,155
13	November 24	at **Pittsburgh Steelers**	**L** 14–26	9–3	Three Rivers Stadium	45,795
14	December 2	Philadelphia Eagles	**L** 6–13	9–4	Astrodome	61,141
15	December 8	**Pittsburgh Steelers**	**W** 31–6	10–4	Astrodome	59,225
16	December 15	at **Cleveland Browns**	**W** 17–14	11–4	Cleveland Municipal Stadium	55,680
17	December 21	at New York Giants	**L** 20–24	11–5	Giants Stadium	63,421
Note: Intra-division opponents are in **bold** text.

=== Games summaries ===
==== Week 1 vs Raiders ====
Week One: Los Angeles Raiders (0–0) at Houston Oilers (0–0)

Quarter	1	2	3	4	Total
Raiders	0	7	3	7	**17**
**Oilers**	6	10	21	10	**47**

at Astrodome, Houston, Texas

- Date: September 1
- Game time: 4:00 p.m.
- Game weather: Indoors (dome)
- Game attendance: 61,367
- Box Score, Box Score

Game information

First quarter

- HOU – Allen Pinkett 8-yard run (kick failed), 5:37. Oilers 6–0.

Second quarter

- HOU – Warren Moon 1-yard run (Ian Howfield kick), 13:40. Oilers 13–0.
- HOU – Ian Howfield 34-yard field goal, 5:27. Oilers 16–0.
- LA – Willie Gault 59-yard pass from Jay Schroeder (Jeff Jaeger kick), 2:44. Oilers 16–7.

Third quarter

- HOU – Ernest Givins 22-yard pass from Warren Moon (Ian Howfield kick), 12:17. Oilers 23–7.
- LA – Jeff Jaeger 39-yard field goal, 7:24. Oilers 23–10.
- HOU – Tony Jones 28-yard pass from Warren Moon (Ian Howfield kick), 5:59. Oilers 30–10.
- HOU – Mike Dumas 19-yard fumble return (Ian Howfield kick), 3:45. Oilers 37–10.

Fourth quarter

- HOU – Ian Howfield 46-yard field goal, 9:43. Oilers 40–10.
- LA – Sam Graddy 80-yard pass from Vince Evans (Jeff Jaeger kick), 9:29. Oilers 40–10.
- HOU – Gary Brown 39-yard run (Ian Howfield kick), 1:52. Oilers 47–10.

Top passers

- LA – Vince Evans – 6/10, 127 yards, TD, INT
- HOU – Warren Moon – 18/33, 250 yards, 2 TD

Top rushers

- LA – Marcus Allen – 8 rushes, 17 yards
- HOU – Allen Pinkett – 26 rushes, 144 yards

Top receivers

- LA – Sam Graddy – 3 receptions, 102 yards, TD
- HOU – Ernest Givins – 6 receptions, 90 yards, TD

==== Week 14 ====
Philadelphia Eagles (7–5) at Houston Oilers (9–3)

Quarter	1	2	3	4	Total
Eagles	0	0	10	3	**13**
Oilers	0	3	3	0	**6**

at Astrodome • Houston, Texas

- Date: December 2
- Game time: 9:00 p.m. EST
- Game weather: Indoors (dome)
- Referee: Tom Dooley
- TV announcers (ABC): Al Michaels, Frank Gifford, and Dan Dierdorf
- Pro-Football-Reference.com

Game information

Eagles

- Jim McMahon
  12/20, 84 yards, int
- James Joseph
  12 rush, 56 yards
- Roy Green
  3 rec, 44 yards

Oilers

- Warren Moon
  24/46, 262 yards
- Allen Pinkett
  6 rush, 10 yards
- Ernest Givens
  6 rec, 89 yards

Scoring summary

Quarter	Time	Drive			Team	Scoring information	Score	
Quarter	Time	Plays	Yards	TOP	Team	Scoring information	PHI	HOU
2					Oilers	42-yard field goal by Del Greco	0	3
3					Eagles	23-yard field goal by Ruzek	3	3
3					Eagles	Jackson 21-yard touchdown reception from Kemp, Ruzek kick good	10	3
4					Oilers	47-yard field goal by Del Greco	10	6
4					Eagles	29-yard field goal by Ruzek	13	6
"TOP" = time of possession. For other American football terms, see Glossary of American football.							13	6

This would be the Oilers' last home loss to the Eagles until 2026 (when the franchise became the Tennessee Titans in 1999).

=== Standings ===
AFC Central
	W	L	T	PCT	DIV	CONF	PF	PA	STK
^{(3)} Houston Oilers	11	5	0	.688	5–1	10–2	386	251	L1
Pittsburgh Steelers	7	9	0	.438	4–2	7–5	292	344	W2
Cleveland Browns	6	10	0	.375	2–4	6–6	293	298	L3
Cincinnati Bengals	3	13	0	.188	1–5	2–10	263	435	W1

== Playoffs ==
=== AFC Wild Card ===
Houston Oilers 17, New York Jets 10

Quarter	1	2	3	4	Total
Jets	0	10	0	0	10
Oilers	7	7	0	3	17

at Astrodome, Houston, Texas

- Game time: 4:00 p.m. EST/3:00 p.m. CST
- Game weather: Played indoors, domed stadium
- Game attendance: 61,485
- Referee: Tom White
- TV announcers (NBC): Marv Albert and Paul Maguire

After leading 14–10 at halftime, the Oilers stopped the Jets twice inside the 5-yard line in the second half to preserve the victory. Houston quarterback Warren Moon threw two touchdowns in the first half, both to Ernest Givins for 5 and 20 yards. This would be the team's last playoff win while playing in Houston and would not win another playoff game until the Music City Miracle during the 1999 playoffs, their third season in Tennessee and their first season as the Titans.

=== AFC Divisional Playoff ===
Denver Broncos 26, Houston Oilers 24

Quarter	1	2	3	4	Total
Oilers	14	7	0	3	24
Broncos	6	7	3	10	26

at Mile High Stadium, Denver, Colorado

- Game time: 4:00 p.m. EST/2:00 p.m. MST
- Game weather: 30 °F (−1 °C), cloudy
- Game attendance: 75,301
- Referee: Johnny Grier
- TV announcers (NBC): Charlie Jones and Todd Christensen

Trailing 24–23 with 2:07 left in the game, quarterback John Elway led the Broncos from their own 2-yard line to the winning 28-yard field goal with 16 seconds remaining. On the drive, he converted on two fourth downs. On fourth down and 6 from the Denver 28, he rushed for 7 yards. Then on fourth down and 10, he completed a 44-yard pass to wide receiver Vance Johnson.

The Oilers jumped to a 14–0 lead with quarterback Warren Moon's two touchdown passes to wide receivers Haywood Jeffires and Drew Hill for 15 and 9 yards, respectively. Elway then completed a 10-yard touchdown to Johnson, but kicker David Treadwell missed the extra point. Moon responded by throwing a 6-yard touchdown to wide receiver Curtis Duncan to give Houston a 21–6 lead, but Denver running back Greg Lewis scored a 1-yard touchdown before halftime. In the second half, the Oilers were limited to only a 25-yard field goal by kicker Al Del Greco, which gave Houston a 24–16 lead in the fourth quarter. The Broncos then marched 80 yards to score on Lewis' 1-yard touchdown run to cut the deficit to 24–23.

Elway's comeback is now known solely as The Drive II.

== Awards and records ==
- Haywood Jeffires – Houston Oilers record, most receptions in one game, (13)
- Haywood Jeffires, All Pro selection
- Haywood Jeffires, Pro Bowl selection
- Warren Moon, Pro Bowl selection
- Warren Moon, Houston Oilers record, most passing yards in a season (4,690)
- Warren Moon, NFL leader, most passing yards in a season (4,690)

=== Milestones ===
- Haywood Jeffires – 1st 100 reception season
- Haywood Jeffires – 2nd 1,000 yard receiving season (1,181 yards)
- Warren Moon, 2nd 4,000 yard passing season (4,690)
- Warren Moon, 3rd 400 yard passing game (423 vs. New York Jets)
- Warren Moon, 4th 400 yard passing game (432 vs. Dallas Cowboys)
