= 1990 Houston Oilers season =

NFL team season

- Owner: Bud Adams
- General manager: Mike Holovak
- Head coach: Jack Pardee
- Offensive coordinator: Kevin Gilbride
- Defensive coordinator: Jim Eddy
- Home stadium: Houston Astrodome

Results
- Record: 9–7
- Division place: 2nd AFC Central
- Playoffs: Lost Wild Card Playoffs (at Bengals) 14–41

Uniform
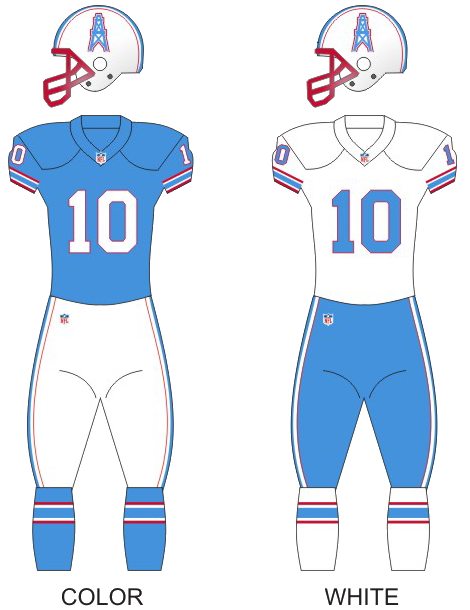

The 1990 Houston Oilers season was the 31st season and their 21st in the National Football League (NFL). The Oilers scored 405 points which ranked second in the AFC and second overall in the NFL. Their defense gave up 307 points. During the season, the Oilers appeared once on Monday Night Football and defeated the Buffalo Bills. On December 16, 1990, Warren Moon threw for 527 yards in a game against the Kansas City Chiefs. Moon was part of the Oilers "Run and shoot" era. The run and shoot offense also incorporated teammates Ernest Givins, Drew Hill, Haywood Jeffires and Curtis Duncan. The 1990 season saw the Oilers appear in the playoffs for the fourth consecutive season. They finished tied for first in the AFC Central with the Cincinnati Bengals and Pittsburgh Steelers, as all three teams finished with identical 9–7 records. The Bengals would be awarded the division title by having a better division record than Houston or Pittsburgh. The Oilers would win the tiebreaker over the Steelers by having a better division record than them. This placed them in second place behind Cincinnati, who would turn out to be their playoff opponent. However, they would have to play their playoff game without Moon, who dislocated his thumb two weeks before the season ended when he hit his thumb on the helmet of defender James Francis. Cody Carlson was tapped to start in what became his only career playoff start. As a result, the Oilers were embarrassed by the Bengals 41–14 in the wild card game, in what was Cincinnati's last playoff win until 2021, being outgained 349–226 in total yards and committing 2 turnovers in the defeat.

== Offseason ==
=== NFL draft ===
1990 Houston Oilers draft
Round	Pick	Player	Position	College	Notes
1	15	Lamar Lathon *	Linebacker	Houston	
2	41	Jeff Alm	Defensive tackle	Notre Dame	
3	72	Willis Peguese	Defensive end	Miami (FL)	
4	99	Eric Still	Guard	Tennessee	
5	126	Richard Newbill	Linebacker	Miami (FL)	
6	153	Tony Jones	Wide receiver	Texas	
7	184	Andy Murray	Running back	Kentucky	
8	211	Brett Tucker	Safety	Northern Illinois	
9	237	Pat Coleman	Wide receiver	Ole Miss	
10	264	Dee Thomas	Cornerback	Nicholls State	
11	295	Joey Banes	Tackle	Houston	
12	321	Reggie Slack	Quarterback	Auburn	
Made roster * Made at least one Pro Bowl during career

=== Undrafted free agents ===
1990 undrafted free agents of note
Player	Position	College
Victor Jones	Running back	LSU

== Personnel ==
1990 Houston Oilers staff
Front office: Owner/Chairman of the Board/President – Bud Adams; Executive Vice President/General Manager – Mike Holovak; Assistant General Manager – Floyd Reese; Head coaches: Head Coach – Jack Pardee; Offensive coaches: Offensive Coordinator – Kevin Gilbride; Running Backs – Frank Novak; Receivers – Chris Palmer; Offensive Line – Bob Young	Defensive coaches: Defensive Coordinator – Jim Eddy; Defensive Line – Jim Stanley; Linebackers – Richard Smith; Defensive Backs – Pat Thomas; Quality Control – Gregg Williams; Special teams coaches: Special Teams – Richard Smith; Strength and conditioning: Strength and Rehabilitation – Steve Watterson

== Roster ==
1990 Houston Oilers roster
Quarterbacks (QB): 14 Cody Carlson; 1 Warren Moon; 10 Reggie Slack; Running backs (RB): 37 Victor Jones; 20 Allen Pinkett; 44 Lorenzo White; Wide receivers (WR): 80 Curtis Duncan; 88 Bernard Ford KR; 81 Ernest Givins; 83 Leonard Harris; 85 Drew Hill; 84 Haywood Jeffires; 82 Tony Jones; 89 Gerald McNeil; Tight ends (TE)	Offensive linemen (OL): 66 Doug Dawson G; 78 Don Maggs T; 74 Bruce Matthews G; 63 Mike Munchak G; 64 Erik Norgard C/G; 52 Jay Pennison C; 70 Dean Steinkuhler T; 73 David Williams T; Defensive linemen (DL): 76 Jeff Alm DT; 79 Ray Childress DT; 95 William Fuller DE; 90 Ezra Johnson DE/DT; 96 Sean Jones DE; 94 Glenn Montgomery DT; 99 Doug Smith DT	Linebackers (LB): 51 Eric Fairs OLB; 59 John Grimsley OLB; 56 Scott Kozak OLB; 57 Lamar Lathon OLB; 91 Johnny Meads OLB; 53 Eugene Seale MLB; 54 Al Smith MLB; Defensive backs (DB): 29 Patrick Allen CB; 24 Steve Brown CB; 28 Cris Dishman CB; 23 Richard Johnson CB; 27 Terry Kinard FS; 21 Leander Knight CB/S; 25 Bubba McDowell SS; 26 Bo Orlando FS; 36 Dee Thomas CB/S; Special teams (ST): 8 Teddy Garcia K; 9 Greg Montgomery P	Practice squad: 17 Pat Coleman WR; 98 Keith Friberg DE; 30 Doug Lloyd RB; 6 Tom Muecke QB; Reserve: 72 Willis Peguese DE (IR); -- Willie Snead WR (IR); 68 Alex Stewart DE (IR); 22 Brett Tucker S (NF-Inj.); 7 Tony Zendejas K (IR); 47 active, 5 inactive, 4 practice squad Rookies in italics

== Regular season ==
=== Schedule ===
Week	Date	Opponent	Result	Record	Venue	Attendance
1	September 9	at Atlanta Falcons	**L** 27–47	0–1	Atlanta–Fulton County Stadium	56,222
2	September 16	at **Pittsburgh Steelers**	**L** 9–20	0–2	Three Rivers Stadium	54,814
3	September 23	Indianapolis Colts	**W** 24–10	1–2	Astrodome	50,093
4	September 30	at San Diego Chargers	**W** 17–7	2–2	Jack Murphy Stadium	48,762
5	October 7	San Francisco 49ers	**L** 21–24	2–3	Astrodome	59,931
6	October 14	**Cincinnati Bengals**	**W** 48–17	3–3	Astrodome	53,501
7	October 21	New Orleans Saints	**W** 23–10	4–3	Astrodome	57,908
8	October 28	New York Jets	**L** 12–17	4–4	Astrodome	56,337
9	November 4	at Los Angeles Rams	**L** 13–17	4–5	Anaheim Stadium	52,628
10	Bye					
11	November 18	at **Cleveland Browns**	**W** 35–23	5–5	Cleveland Municipal Stadium	76,726
12	November 26	Buffalo Bills	**W** 27–24	6–5	Astrodome	60,130
13	December 2	at Seattle Seahawks	**L** 10–13 (OT)	6–6	Kingdome	57,592
14	December 9	**Cleveland Browns**	**W** 58–14	7–6	Astrodome	54,469
15	December 16	at Kansas City Chiefs	**W** 27–10	8–6	Arrowhead Stadium	61,756
16	December 23	at **Cincinnati Bengals**	**L** 20–40	8–7	Riverfront Stadium	60,044
17	December 30	**Pittsburgh Steelers**	**W** 34–14	9–7	Astrodome	56,906

Note: Intra-division opponents are in bold text.

=== Standings ===
AFC Central
	W	L	T	PCT	DIV	CONF	PF	PA	STK
^{(3)} Cincinnati Bengals	9	7	0	.563	5–1	8–4	360	352	W2
^{(6)} Houston Oilers	9	7	0	.563	4–2	8–4	405	307	W1
Pittsburgh Steelers	9	7	0	.563	2–4	6–6	292	240	L1
Cleveland Browns	3	13	0	.188	1–5	2–10	228	462	L2

== Playoffs ==
=== AFC Wild Card ===
Cincinnati Bengals 41, Houston Oilers 14

Quarter	1	2	3	4	Total
Oilers	0	0	7	7	14
Bengals	10	10	14	7	41

at Riverfront Stadium, Cincinnati

- Game time: 12:30 p.m. EST
- Game weather: 40 °F (4 °C), rain
- Game attendance: 60,012
- Referee: Dale Hamer
- TV announcers (NBC): Don Criqui and Bob Trumpy

== Awards and records ==
- Ray Childress, 1990 AFC Pro Bowl selection
- Ernest Givins, Pro Bowl selection
- Drew Hill, Ranked second in AFC in receptions
- Haywood Jeffires, Led AFC in Receptions
- Warren Moon, NFL leader, passing yards (4,689)
- Warren Moon, Pro Bowl selection
- Warren Moon, All-Pro selection (1990)
- Warren Moon, NEA NFL MVP
- Warren Moon, NFL Offensive Player of the Year
- Warren Moon, UPI AFL-AFC Player of the Year
- Warren Moon, Houston Oilers record, most passing yards in one game (527)

=== Milestones ===
- Haywood Jeffires – 1st 1,000 Yard Receiving Season (1,048 yards)
- Drew Hill – 4th 1,000 Yard Receiving Season (1,019 yards)
- Warren Moon, 2nd 400 Yard Passing Game (527)
