= 1989 Houston Oilers season =

NFL team season

- Owner: Bud Adams
- General manager: Mike Holovak
- Head coach: Jerry Glanville
- Offensive coordinator: Kevin Gilbride
- Home stadium: Houston Astrodome

Results
- Record: 9–7
- Division place: 2nd AFC Central
- Playoffs: Lost Wild Card Playoffs (vs. Steelers) 23–26 (OT)

Uniform
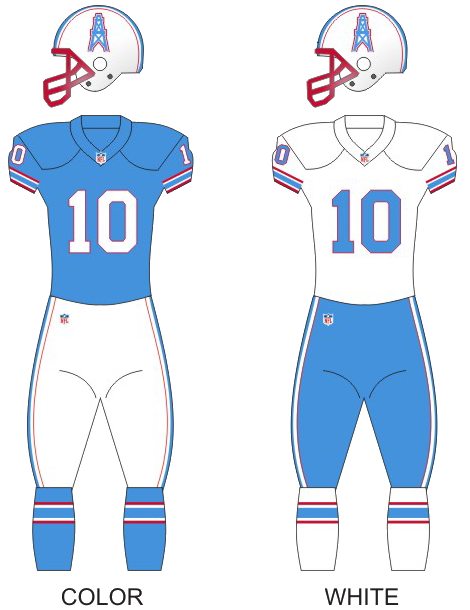

The 1989 Houston Oilers season was the franchise's 30th season and their 20th in the National Football League (NFL). The franchise scored 365 points while the defense gave up 412 points. Their record of 9 wins and 7 losses resulted in a second-place finish in the AFC Central Division. The Oilers appeared once on Monday Night Football and appeared in the playoffs for the third consecutive year. It would be Jerry Glanville’s final year as the Oilers coach. Despite making the playoffs, the Oilers, like their arch rivals, the Pittsburgh Steelers, had a negative point differential, making them the first teams since the 1984 Giants with this distinction.

== Offseason ==
=== NFL draft ===
1989 Houston Oilers draft
Round	Pick	Player	Position	College	Notes
1	23	David Williams	Offensive tackle	Florida	
2	50	Scott Kozak	Linebacker	Oregon	
3	77	Bubba McDowell	Safety	Miami (FL)	
4	104	Rod Harris	Wide receiver	Texas A&M	
5	131	Glenn Montgomery	Defensive tackle	Houston	
6	157	Bo Orlando	Safety	West Virginia	
7	190	Tracy Rogers	Linebacker	Fresno State	
8	217	Alvoid Mays	Cornerback	West Virginia	
9	244	Bob Mrosko	Tight end	Penn State	
10	271	Tracy Johnson	Running back	Clemson	
11	298	Brian Smider	Tackle	West Virginia	
12	325	Chuck Hartlieb	Quarterback	Iowa	
Made roster

=== Undrafted free agents ===
1989 undrafted free agents of note
Player	Position	College
Steve Avery	Fullback	Northern Michigan
Scott Bednarski	Fullback	TCU
Twalure Boyd	Wide receiver	Wyoming
Daryl llikainen	Guard	North Dakota State
Wesley Keck	Fullback	North Texas State

== Personnel ==
1989 Houston Oilers staff
Front office: Owner/Chairman of the Board/President – Bud Adams; Executive Vice President/General Manager – Mike Holovak; Head coaches: Head coach – Jerry Glanville; Offensive coaches: Quarterbacks – Kevin Gilbride; Running Backs – Frank Novak; Receivers – Ray Sherman; Tight Ends – Richard Smith; Offensive Line – Kim Helton	Defensive coaches: Defensive Line – Doug Shively; Linebackers – Floyd Reese; Secondary – Nick Saban; Special teams coaches: Special Teams – Richard Smith; Strength and conditioning: Strength and Rehabilitation – Steve Watterson

== Roster ==
1989 Houston Oilers roster
Quarterbacks (QB): 14 Cody Carlson; 1 Warren Moon; Running backs (RB): 32 Alonzo Highsmith FB; 45 Tracy Johnson; 20 Allen Pinkett; 30 Mike Rozier; 44 Lorenzo White KR; Wide receivers (WR): 80 Curtis Duncan; 81 Ernest Givins; 83 Leonard Harris; 85 Drew Hill; 86 Kenny Jackson; 84 Haywood Jeffires; Tight ends (TE): 87 Bob Mrosko; 88 Chris Verhulst	Offensive linemen (OL): 77 Bruce Davis T; 78 Don Maggs G/T; 74 Bruce Matthews G; 63 Mike Munchak G; 52 Jay Pennison C; 70 Dean Steinkuhler T; 73 David Williams T; 66 George Yarno C/G; Defensive linemen (DL): 71 Richard Byrd; 79 Ray Childress DE; 95 William Fuller DE; 96 Sean Jones DE; 94 Glenn Montgomery NT; 99 Doug Smith NT	Linebackers (LB): 51 Eric Fairs OLB; 59 John Grimsley ILB; 56 Scott Kozak OLB; 93 Robert Lyles OLB; 91 Johnny Meads OLB; 53 Eugene Seale ILB; 54 Al Smith ILB; Defensive backs (DB): 29 Patrick Allen CB; 33 Billy Bell CB; 24 Steve Brown CB; 28 Cris Dishman CB; 31 Jeff Donaldson FS; 21 Tracey Eaton FS; 22 Kenny Johnson SS; 23 Richard Johnson CB; 25 Bubba McDowell SS; Special teams (ST): 9 Greg Montgomery P; 7 Tony Zendejas K	Practice squad: 58 John Brantley LB; 64 Erik Norgard C/G; 26 Bo Orlando S; 92 Anthony Spears DT; Reserve: 97 Mark Garalczyk DE (IR); 47 active, 1 inactive, 4 practice squad Rookies in italics

== Regular season ==
=== Schedule ===
Week	Date	Opponent	Result	Record	Venue	Attendance
1	September 10	at Minnesota Vikings	**L** 7–38	0–1	Hubert H. Humphrey Metrodome	54,015
2	September 17	at San Diego Chargers	**W** 34–27	1–1	Jack Murphy Stadium	42,013
3	September 24	Buffalo Bills	**L** 41–47 (OT)	1–2	Astrodome	57,278
4	October 1	Miami Dolphins	**W** 39–7	2–2	Astrodome	53,326
5	October 8	at New England Patriots	**L** 13–23	2–3	Sullivan Stadium	59,828
6	October 15	at Chicago Bears	**W** 33–28	3–3	Soldier Field	64,383
7	October 22	**Pittsburgh Steelers**	**W** 27–0	4–3	Astrodome	59,091
8	October 29	at **Cleveland Browns**	**L** 17–28	4–4	Cleveland Municipal Stadium	78,765
9	November 5	Detroit Lions	**W** 35–31	5–4	Astrodome	48,056
10	November 13	**Cincinnati Bengals**	**W** 26–24	6–4	Astrodome	60,694
11	November 19	Los Angeles Raiders	**W** 23–7	7–4	Astrodome	59,198
12	November 26	at Kansas City Chiefs	**L** 0–34	7–5	Arrowhead Stadium	51,342
13	December 3	at **Pittsburgh Steelers**	**W** 23–16	8–5	Three Rivers Stadium	40,541
14	December 10	Tampa Bay Buccaneers	**W** 20–17	9–5	Astrodome	54,532
15	December 17	at **Cincinnati Bengals**	**L** 7–61	9–6	Riverfront Stadium	47,510
16	December 23	**Cleveland Browns**	**L** 20–24	9–7	Astrodome	58,852
Note: Intra-division opponents are in **bold** text.

=== Playoffs ===
Round	Date	Opponent (seed)	Result	Record	Venue	Attendance
Wildcard	December 31	Pittsburgh Steelers (5)	**L** 23–26 (OT)	0–1	Astrodome	58,406

=== Standings ===
AFC Central
	W	L	T	PCT	DIV	CONF	PF	PA	STK
^{(2)} Cleveland Browns	9	6	1	.594	3–3	6–5–1	334	254	W2
^{(4)} Houston Oilers	9	7	0	.563	3–3	6–6	365	412	L2
^{(5)} Pittsburgh Steelers	9	7	0	.563	1–5	6–6	265	326	W3
Cincinnati Bengals	8	8	0	.500	5–1	6–6	404	285	L1

=== Week 3 ===
Buffalo Bills (1-1) at Houston Oilers (1-1)

Team	1	2	3	4	OT	Total
• Bills	10	10	7	14	6	47
Oilers	7	3	14	17	0	41

- Date: September 24
- Location: Astrodome Houston, TX
- Game start: 1:00 PM EST
- Game attendance: 57,278
- Game weather: Dome
- Referee: Jerry Seeman
- TV announcers (NBC): Marv Albert and Bob Trumpy

== Playoffs ==
=== AFC Wildcard Game ===
Pittsburgh Steelers 26, Houston Oilers 23 (OT)

Quarter	1	2	3	4	OT	Total
Steelers	7	3	3	10	3	26
Oilers	0	6	3	14	0	23

at Astrodome, Houston, Texas

- Game time: 4:00 p.m. EST/3:00 p.m. CST
- Game attendance: 59,406
- Referee: Pat Haggerty
- TV announcers (NBC): Marv Albert and Bob Trumpy

Steelers defensive back Rod Woodson recovered a fumble to set up Gary Anderson's winning 51-yard field goal in overtime to give Pittsburgh the win. The Steelers scored first with running back Tim Worley's 1-yard rushing touchdown. But from that point on until the fourth quarter, the two teams exchanged 6 field goals. In the final period, Oilers quarterback Warren Moon, who finished the game with 315 passing yards, threw two touchdowns to wide receiver Ernest Givins, an 18-yarder and a 9-yarder. However, Pittsburgh running back Merrill Hoge tied the game on a 2-yard rushing touchdown with 46 seconds left in regulation.

Hoge finished the game with 100 rushing yards on just 17 carries, along with 3 receptions for 26 yards.

== Awards and records ==
- Ray Childress, 1989 AFC Pro Bowl selection
- Warren Moon, Pro Bowl
- Warren Moon, All-Pro selection
- Warren Moon, Man of the Year

=== Milestones ===
- Warren Moon, 1st 400 Yard Passing Game (414)
