= Chris Palmer (American football) =

American football player, coach, and administrator (born 1949)

Biographical details
- Born: September 23, 1949 (age 77); Brewster, New York, U.S.
- Education: Southern Connecticut State

Playing career
- 1969–1971: Southern Connecticut State
- Position: Quarterback

Coaching career (HC unless noted)
- 1972: Connecticut (DL)
- 1973–1974: Connecticut (WR)
- 1975: Lehigh (WR)
- 1976–1982: Colgate (OC)
- 1983: Montreal Concordes (OL)
- 1984: New Jersey Generals (WR)
- 1985: New Jersey Generals (OC/QB)
- 1986–1987: New Haven
- 1988–1989: Boston University
- 1990–1992: Houston Oilers (WR)
- 1993–1995: New England Patriots (WR)
- 1996: New England Patriots (QB)
- 1997–1998: Jacksonville Jaguars (OC/QB)
- 1999–2000: Cleveland Browns
- 2002–2005: Houston Texans (OC)
- 2006: Dallas Cowboys (QB)
- 2007–2009: New York Giants (QB)
- 2010: Hartford Colonials
- 2011–2012: Tennessee Titans (OC)
- 2014: San Francisco 49ers (offensive assistant)
- 2015–2016: Buffalo Bills (senior offensive assistant)

Administrative career (AD unless noted)
- 2010: Hartford Colonials (GM)
- 2018–2019: New Haven

Head coaching record
- Overall: 24–18 (college); 8–32 (professional)

Chris Palmer (born September 23, 1949) is an American former football coach and college athletics administrator. Palmer served as the head coach for Cleveland Browns of the National Football League (NFL) from 1999 to 2000 and in the same capacity with the Hartford Colonials of the United Football League (UFL) in 2010. He was the head football coach at the University of New Haven from 1986 to 1987 and at Boston University from 1988 to 1989. Palmer has also served as an assistant coach with the Dallas Cowboys, Houston Texans, Jacksonville Jaguars, New England Patriots, New York Giants, San Francisco 49ers, Houston Oilers, Tennessee Titans and the Buffalo Bills of the NFL. He later returned to the University of New Haven and served as the athletic director from 2018 to 2019.

== High school and college ==
Palmer played high school football at Immaculate High School, a small Catholic high school in Danbury, Connecticut. After high school, he attended and played college football at Southern Connecticut State University (SCSU). Palmer played quarterback for Southern Connecticut State from 1968 to 1971. He earned both bachelor's and master's degrees at SCSU, where he was inducted into the school's athletic Hall of Fame.

After graduation from Southern Connecticut State University, Palmer coached under Larry Naviaux at the University of Connecticut. Palmer coached the freshman defensive line in 1972 and the varsity wide receivers in 1973 and 1974. In 1975, he became the wide receivers coach at Lehigh University. The following year, Palmer was named the offensive coordinator at Colgate University, where he stayed for seven years.

Prior to entering the NFL, Palmer was a college football coach. He was the head coach at Boston University in 1988 and 1989 and at the University of New Haven in 1986 and 1987, when the Chargers posted consecutive 8–2 records.

== Professional ==
=== Initial professional coaching experience ===
Palmer's first professional coaching experience came in 1983, when he was the offensive line coach for the Montreal Concordes in the Canadian Football League. The following year, he coached the wide receivers for the USFL's New Jersey Generals. In 1985, he was promoted to quarterbacks coach and offensive coordinator. That year, Palmer's offense featured quarterback Doug Flutie and running back Herschel Walker, who rushed for 2,411 yards.

=== Houston Oilers ===
Palmer's first NFL coaching experience was as the Houston Oilers wide receivers coach from 1990 to 1992 when Kevin Gilbride was the Houston offensive coordinator. During those three seasons, the Run ‘N Shoot Oilers had the NFL's most productive passing attack. Four Houston wide receivers—Curtis Duncan, Ernest Givens (twice), Drew Hill and Haywood Jeffires (twice)—made the Pro Bowl while being coached by Palmer.

=== New England Patriots ===
Palmer first worked under Bill Parcells as the New England Patriots wide receivers coach from 1993 to 1995. In 1996, he became the quarterbacks coach, where he worked with Drew Bledsoe as they advanced to Super Bowl XXXI.

=== Jacksonville Jaguars ===
Following Super Bowl XXXI, he joined the Jacksonville Jaguars, spending the 1997–98 seasons as offensive coordinator and quarterbacks under head coach Tom Coughlin.

=== Cleveland Browns ===
Palmer became the head coach of the reborn Cleveland Browns for the 1999–2000 seasons, the first two for the "new" Browns after the original team had moved to Baltimore. Palmer struggled to make the team competitive, especially on offense. Palmer was fired after posting a 5–27 record in two seasons, and was succeeded by former University of Miami coach Butch Davis. During his tenure in Cleveland, he starred as himself on an episode of The Drew Carey Show, which took place in Cleveland.

=== Houston Texans ===
In 2002, he became the offensive coordinator of the expansion Houston Texans under head coach Dom Capers. He remained with Houston until he was fired in Week 2 of the 2005 NFL season as a result of Houston's lackluster offense and would not be retained under new head coach Gary Kubiak.

=== Dallas Cowboys ===
In January 2006, several months after his firing from Houston, Palmer was hired by the Dallas Cowboys to be the quarterbacks coach. He was reunited with head coach Bill Parcells and quarterback Drew Bledsoe with whom he had worked during his days with the New England Patriots.

=== New York Giants ===
In January 2007, Palmer was hired by the New York Giants as their new quarterbacks coach, reuniting with the team's head coach, Tom Coughlin, with whom he had worked in Jacksonville. In Palmer's first year with the Giants, they would go on to win Super Bowl XLII, defeating the previously undefeated New England Patriots by a score of 17–14. Palmer coached quarterbacks Eli Manning, Jared Lorenzen, Anthony Wright, David Carr, and Rhett Bomar in his 3 seasons as quarterbacks coach.

On January 29, 2010, Palmer announced his retirement.

=== Hartford Colonials ===
Following his retirement from the NFL, Palmer was named as the head coach and general manager of the United Football League's Hartford Colonials.

=== Tennessee Titans ===
On February 15, 2011, the Tennessee Titans named Palmer as the new offensive coordinator, which was previously held by Mike Heimerdinger. Under Palmer during the 2011 season the Titans scored 325 points (20.3/g), 21st of 32 in the NFL. On November 26, 2012, Palmer was fired by the team midway through the season, and replaced by quarterbacks coach Dowell Loggains.

=== San Francisco 49ers ===
During the 2014 season, the San Francisco 49ers hired Palmer as an offensive assistant under head coach Jim Harbaugh. 2014 was the inaugural season playing their home games at Levi's Stadium in Santa Clara, California. At the end of the season, Harbaugh left the Niners to become the head coach at his alma mater, the University of Michigan, and had released Greg Roman, the offensive coordinator, and ultimately Palmer as well.

=== Buffalo Bills ===
Palmer followed Roman to Buffalo, served as an offensive assistant on Rex Ryan's staff from 2015 to 2016. He was not retained under new head coach Sean McDermott.

=== Return to college athletics ===
Palmer returned to New Haven to serve as the director of athletics and recreation for the Chargers' NCAA Division II athletics program in January 2018. He retired in June 2019.

He was inducted into the New Haven Chargers Athletics Hall of Fame in 1997 for his previous success as the school's head football coach.

== Head coaching record ==
=== College ===
Year	Team	Overall	Conference	Standing	Bowl/playoffs
New Haven Chargers (NCAA Division II independent) (1986–1987)
1986	New Haven	8–2			
1987	New Haven	8–2			
New Haven:		16–4			
Boston University Terriers (Yankee Conference) (1988–1989)
1988	Boston University	4–7	3–5	T–7th	
1989	Boston University	4–7	4–4	6th	
Boston University:		8–14	7–9		
Total:		24–18			

=== Professional ===
Team	Year	Regular season					Postseason			
Team	Year	Won	Lost	Ties	Win %	Finish	Won	Lost	Win %	Result
CLE	1999	2	14	0	.125	6th in AFC Central	-	-	-	-
CLE	2000	3	13	0	.188	6th in AFC Central	-	-	-	-
CLE Total		5	27	0	.156		-	-	-	-
HAR	2010	3	5	0	.375	4th in UFL	-	-	-	-
HAR Total		3	5	0	.375		-	-	-	-
Total		8	32	0	.200		-	-	-	-
