= 1992 Cleveland Browns season =

47th season in franchise history

- Owner: Art Modell
- Head coach: Bill Belichick
- Defensive coordinator: Nick Saban
- Home stadium: Cleveland Municipal Stadium

Results
- Record: 7–9
- Division place: 3rd AFC Central
- Playoffs: Did not qualify
- Pro Bowlers: None

The 1992 Cleveland Browns season was the team's 43rd season with the National Football League.

== Offseason ==
Additions	Subtractions
RB Ron Wolfley (Cardinals)	C Mike Baab (Chiefs)
TE Mark Bavaro (Giants)	WR Webster Slaughter (Oilers)
RB James Brooks (Bengals)	
CB Alonzo Hampton (Buccaneers)	
WR Jamie Holland (Raiders)	
TE Pete Holohan (Chiefs)	
WR Keenan McCardell (Redskins)	

=== NFL draft ===
1992 Cleveland Browns draft
Round	Pick	Player	Position	College	Notes
1	9	Tommy Vardell	Fullback	Stanford	
2	52	Patrick Rowe	Wide receiver	San Diego State	
3	65	Bill Johnson	Defensive tackle	Michigan State	
3	78	Gerald Dixon	Linebacker	South Carolina	
6	143	Rico Smith	Wide receiver	Colorado	
7	177	Selwyn Jones	Cornerback	Colorado State	
9	233	Tim Hill	Cornerback	Kansas	
10	260	Marcus Lowe	Defensive tackle	Baylor	
11	289	Augustin Olobia	Wide receiver	Washington State	
12	316	Keithen McCant	Quarterback	Nebraska	
12	339	Tim Simpson	Guard	Illinois	
Made roster

== Personnel ==
=== Staff ===
1992 Cleveland Browns staff
Front office: Owner and president – Art Modell; Director of pro personnel – Michael Lombardi; Director of College Scouting – Dom Anile; Head coaches: Head coach – Bill Belichick; Offensive coaches: Quarterbacks – Gary Tranquill; Running Backs – Steve Crosby; Wide receivers – Richard Mann; Offensive line – Hal Hunter; Assistant offensive line/Tight Ends - Pat Hill; Offensive assistant/Tight Ends – Ernie Adams	Defensive coaches: Defensive coordinator – Nick Saban; Defensive line – John Mitchell; Outside linebackers – Al Groh; Inside Linebackers – Jim Bates; Defensive assistant – Phil Savage; Special teams coaches: Special teams – Scott O'Brien; Coaching Assistant – Kevin Spencer; Strength and conditioning: Strength and conditioning – Jerry Simmons; Assistant Strength/Pass Rush Consultant - Joe Kim

=== Roster ===
1992 Cleveland Browns roster
Quarterbacks (QB): 19 Bernie Kosar; 17 Todd Philcox; 18 Mike Tomczak; Running backs (RB): 23 Randy Baldwin; 33 Leroy Hoard; 34 Kevin Mack; 21 Eric Metcalf; 26 Ron Wolfley FB; Wide receivers (WR): 1 Michael Jackson; 87 Keenan McCardell; 84 Rico Smith; 85 Lawyer Tillman; Tight ends (TE): 83 Mark Bavaro; 81 Scott Galbraith; 89 Pete Holohan; 88 Brian Kinchen LS	Offensive linemen (OL): 77 Freddie Childress T; 72 Bob Dahl G; 69 Dan Fike T; 63 Jay Hilgenberg C; 66 Tony Jones T; 68 Ed King G; 60 Lance Zeno C; Defensive linemen (DL): 90 Rob Burnett DE; 94 Bill Johnson DT; 96 James Jones DT; 97 Ernie Logan DT; 92 Michael Dean Perry DT; 98 Anthony Pleasant DE; 75 Pio Sagapolutele DE	Linebackers (LB): 58 David Brandon OLB; 53 Cedric Figaro MLB; 59 Mike Johnson MLB; 57 Clay Matthews OLB; 50 Frank Stams OLB; Defensive backs (DB): 37 Harlon Barnett SS; 36 Fred Foggie CB; 39 Randy Hilliard CB; 25 Alfred Jackson CB; 31 Frank Minnifield CB; 22 Vince Newsome FS; 49 Ken Swilling FS; 24 Terry Taylor CB; 29 Eric Turner SS; 28 Everson Walls CB; Special teams (ST): 11 Brian Hansen P; 3 Matt Stover K	Practice squad: -- Herbie Anderson CB; -- John Brown WR; -- Eddie Sutter LB; Reserve: 52 Richard Brown LB (IR); 80 Shawn Collins WR (IR); 51 Gerald Dixon LB (IR); 27 Derrick Douglas RB (IR); 74 Paul Farren T (PUP); 20 Alan Haller CB (IR); 48 Selwyn Jones CB (IR); 65 Rod Milstead G (IR); 27 Stevon Moore S (IR); 70 John Rienstra G (IR); 86 Patrick Rowe WR (IR); 91 John Thornton DT (IR); 44 Tommy Vardell FB (IR); 95 George Williams DT (IR); 47 active, 14 inactive, 3 practice squad Rookies in italics

== Schedule ==
Week	Date	Opponent	Result	Record	Venue	Attendance
1	September 6	at Indianapolis Colts	**L** 3–14	0–1	Hoosier Dome	50,766
2	September 14	Miami Dolphins	**L** 23–27	0–2	Cleveland Municipal Stadium	74,765
3	September 20	at Los Angeles Raiders	**W** 28–16	1–2	Los Angeles Memorial Coliseum	48,102
4	September 27	Denver Broncos	**L** 0–12	1–3	Cleveland Municipal Stadium	78,064
6	October 11	**Pittsburgh Steelers**	**W** 17–9	2–3	Cleveland Municipal Stadium	78,080
7	October 18	Green Bay Packers	**W** 17–6	3–3	Cleveland Municipal Stadium	69,268
8	October 25	at New England Patriots	**W** 19–17	4–3	Foxboro Stadium	32,219
9	November 1	at **Cincinnati Bengals**	**L** 10–30	4–4	Riverfront Stadium	54,765
10	November 8	at **Houston Oilers**	**W** 24–14	5–4	Houston Astrodome	57,348
11	November 15	San Diego Chargers	**L** 13–14	5–5	Cleveland Municipal Stadium	58,396
12	November 22	at Minnesota Vikings	**L** 13–17	5–6	Hubert H. Humphrey Metrodome	53,323
13	November 29	Chicago Bears	**W** 27–14	6–6	Cleveland Municipal Stadium	73,578
14	December 6	**Cincinnati Bengals**	**W** 37–21	7–6	Cleveland Municipal Stadium	68,368
15	December 13	at Detroit Lions	**L** 14–24	7–7	Pontiac Silverdome	65,970
16	December 20	**Houston Oilers**	**L** 14–17	7–8	Cleveland Municipal Stadium	59,898
17	December 27	at **Pittsburgh Steelers**	**L** 13–23	7–9	Three Rivers Stadium	53,776
Note: Intra-division opponents are in **bold** text.

== Standings ==
AFC Central
	W	L	T	PCT	DIV	CONF	PF	PA	STK
^{(1)} Pittsburgh Steelers	11	5	0	.688	5–1	10–2	299	225	W1
^{(5)} Houston Oilers	10	6	0	.625	3–3	7–5	352	258	W2
Cleveland Browns	7	9	0	.438	3–3	5–7	272	275	L3
Cincinnati Bengals	5	11	0	.313	1–5	4–8	274	364	L1
