= Curtis Duncan =

American football player (born 1965)

No. 80
- Position: Wide receiver

Personal information
- Born: January 26, 1965 (age 61); Detroit, Michigan, U.S.
- Listed height: 5 ft 11 in (1.80 m)
- Listed weight: 184 lb (83 kg)

Career information
- High school: Redford (Detroit, Michigan)
- College: Northwestern
- NFL draft: 1987: 10th round, 258th overall pick

Career history
- Houston Oilers (1987–1993); Green Bay Packers (1994)*
- * Offseason or practice squad member only

Awards and highlights
- Pro Bowl (1992)

Career NFL statistics
- Receptions: 322
- Receiving yards: 3,935
- Receiving touchdowns: 20
- Stats at Pro Football Reference

Curtis Everett Duncan (born January 26, 1965), is an American former professional football player who was a wide receiver in the National Football League (NFL). He was selected by the Houston Oilers in the 10th round of the 1987 NFL draft.

Pre-draft measurables
Height	Weight	Arm length	Hand span	40-yard dash	10-yard split	20-yard split	20-yard shuttle	Vertical jump	Broad jump	Bench press
5 ft 10 1/4 in (1.78 m)	180 lb (82 kg)	31 1/2 in (0.80 m)	9 1/2 in (0.24 m)	4.44 s	1.56 s	2.60 s	4.56 s	31.0 in (0.79 m)	9 ft 9 in (2.97 m)	12 reps
All values from NFL Combine

A 5'11", 184-lb. receiver from Northwestern University, Duncan played his entire seven-year career with the Houston Oilers during the Run & Shoot era with fellow receivers Ernest Givins, Haywood Jeffires, Drew Hill, and quarterback Warren Moon. His best year as a pro came during the 1992 season when he caught 82 receptions for 954 yards, earning him a selection to the Pro Bowl.

== NFL career statistics ==
Legend
**Bold**	Career high

=== Regular season ===
Year	Team	Games		Receiving				
Year	Team	GP	GS	Rec	Yds	Avg	Lng	TD
1987	HOU	10	0	13	237	**18.2**	48	**5**
1988	HOU	**16**	0	22	302	13.7	36	1
1989	HOU	**16**	1	43	613	14.3	55	**5**
1990	HOU	**16**	**16**	66	785	11.9	37	1
1991	HOU	**16**	**16**	55	588	10.7	42	4
1992	HOU	**16**	**16**	**82**	**954**	11.6	**72**	1
1993	HOU	12	12	41	456	11.1	47	3
Career		102	61	322	3,935	12.2	72	20

=== Playoffs ===
Year	Team	Games		Receiving				
Year	Team	GP	GS	Rec	Yds	Avg	Lng	TD
1987	HOU	**2**	0	4	32	8.0	13	0
1988	HOU	**2**	0	3	42	14.0	18	0
1989	HOU	1	0	2	15	7.5	9	0
1990	HOU	1	1	1	15	**15.0**	15	0
1991	HOU	**2**	**2**	**10**	**64**	6.4	11	**1**
1992	HOU	1	1	8	57	7.1	**26**	**1**
1993	HOU	1	1	6	49	8.2	14	0
Career		10	5	34	274	8.1	26	2
