= Rico Smith =

American football player (born 1969)

No. 4, 84
- Position: Wide receiver

Personal information
- Born: January 14, 1969 (age 57); Compton, California, U.S.
- Listed height: 6 ft 2 in (1.88 m)
- Listed weight: 200 lb (91 kg)

Career information
- High school: Paramount (Paramount, California)
- College: Colorado
- NFL draft: 1992: 6th round, 143rd overall pick

Career history
- Cleveland Browns (1992–1995); New York Jets (1996)*
- * Offseason or practice squad member only

Awards and highlights
- National champion (1990)

Career NFL statistics
- Receptions: 24
- Receiving yards: 353
- Touchdowns: 1
- Stats at Pro Football Reference

Rico Louis Smith Jr. (born January 14, 1969) is an American former professional football player who was a wide receiver in the National Football League (NFL) for five seasons. He attended and played college football for Cerritos College and later transferred to the University of Colorado at Boulder. He was selected 143rd overall by the Cleveland Browns in the sixth round of the 1992 NFL draft, playing four years with the Browns and one year with the New York Jets.

== Early life and family ==
Smith was born in Compton, California. He grew up playing baseball, football and running track in Long Beach and Carson. He graduated from Paramount High School, where he played football, basketball, baseball and track for the Paramount Pirates. Smiths' parents are Rico Smith Sr and Doris Smith. He has a sister named Akita. Smith has three children.
