= Alex Johnson (wide receiver) =

American football player (born 1968)

No. 86
- Position: Wide receiver

Personal information
- Born: August 18, 1968 (age 58); Miami, Florida, U.S.
- Listed height: 5 ft 9 in (1.75 m)
- Listed weight: 167 lb (76 kg)

Career information
- High school: Homestead Senior (Homestead, Florida)
- College: Miami (FL)
- NFL draft: 1991: 12th round, 325th overall pick

Career history
- Houston Oilers (1991); New England Patriots (1992)*; Miami Dolphins (1993)*
- * Offseason or practice squad member only

Awards and highlights
- 2× National champion (1987, 1989)
- Stats at Pro Football Reference

Alex Dexter Johnson (born August 18, 1968) is an American former professional football player who was a wide receiver for the Houston Oilers of the National Football League (NFL). He played college football for the Miami Hurricanes.
