= Ernest Givins =

American football player (born 1964)

No. 81, 84
- Position: Wide receiver

Personal information
- Born: September 3, 1964 (age 62); St. Petersburg, Florida, U.S.
- Listed height: 5 ft 9 in (1.75 m)
- Listed weight: 172 lb (78 kg)

Career information
- High school: Lakewood (St. Petersburg)
- College: Louisville
- NFL draft: 1986: 2nd round, 34th overall pick

Career history
- Houston Oilers (1986–1994); Jacksonville Jaguars (1995)

Awards and highlights
- Second-team All-Pro (1990); 2× Pro Bowl (1990, 1992); PFWA All-Rookie Team (1986)

Career NFL statistics
- Receptions: 571
- Receiving yards: 8,215
- Receiving touchdowns: 49
- Stats at Pro Football Reference

Ernest Pastell Givins Jr. (born September 3, 1964), is an American former professional football player who was a wide receiver for 10 seasons in the National Football League (NFL), primarily with the Houston Oilers.

== Early life and college ==
Givins attended Lakewood High School where he was a star football player. He attended Northeastern Oklahoma A&M College, then transferred to the University of Louisville. At Louisville he set records for punt return and kickoff return that still stand. He was a 1985 First Team All-South independent

== Professional career ==
Givins was selected by the Houston Oilers in the 2nd round of the 1986 NFL draft. A 5 ft 9 in (1.75 m), 175 lbs. wide receiver, he played in 10 NFL seasons from 1986 to 1995.

During his rookie season, in a Week 9, 1986 game against the Miami Dolphins, Givins took a reverse and was injured after getting hit in the head/neck area and was taken off the field on a stretcher. He only missed one game and returned two weeks later in Week 11 against the Steelers.

A two-time Pro Bowl selection in 1990 and 1992, he played most of his career with the Oilers, catching passes from quarterback Warren Moon, along with receivers Curtis Duncan, Haywood Jeffires and Drew Hill in the Oilers' "run and shoot" offense. Givins was best known for his touchdown celebration dance known as the "Electric Slide."

After nine seasons with the Oilers, Givins played one season with the Jacksonville Jaguars, then retired.

=== Oilers/Titans franchise records ===
- Most receiving yards (career): 7,935
- Receptions (career): 542

== NFL career statistics ==
Legend
	Led the league
**Bold**	Career high

=== Regular season ===
Year	Team	Games		Receiving				
Year	Team	GP	GS	Rec	Yds	Avg	Lng	TD
1986	HOU	15	15	61	**1,062**	17.4	60	3
1987	HOU	12	12	53	933	**17.6**	**83**	6
1988	HOU	16	16	60	976	16.3	46	5
1989	HOU	15	15	55	794	14.4	48	3
1990	HOU	16	16	**72**	979	13.6	80	9
1991	HOU	16	16	70	996	14.2	49	5
1992	HOU	16	16	67	787	11.7	41	**10**
1993	HOU	16	16	68	887	13.0	80	4
1994	HOU	16	16	36	521	14.5	76	1
1995	JAX	9	9	29	280	9.7	18	3
Career		147	147	571	8,215	14.4	83	49

== Post-professional career ==
He is very active in St. Petersburg's football community. In the mid-1990s, he was offensive coordinator of his high school alma mater, Pinellas Lakewood High School.

== Coaching career ==
Givins served as head coach of St. Petersburg semi-pro football team, the St. Pete Sharks (Suncoast Semi-pro Football League). Givins served as head coach of the Sarasota Millionaires (initially in the United Football Federation and as of 2014 in the Florida Football Alliance (FFA), from 2012 to 2014. On May 26, 2017, Givins was named head coach of the Dunedin Pirates (Florida Football Alliance) based in Dunedin, Florida.

Givins has been the offensive coordinator for Gibbs High School's football team. He also works at Bay Point Middle School in St. Petersburg as a campus monitor.

== Personal life ==
Givins' brother, Anthony, is the head coach of the St. Petersburg-based University of Faith football team.

Givins was inducted into the Kentucky Pro Football Hall of Fame in 2018.
