= Reggie Brown (wide receiver, born 1970) =

American football wide receiver (born 1970)

No. 17, 89
- Position: Wide receiver

Personal information
- Born: May 5, 1970 (age 56); Miami, Florida, U.S.
- Listed height: 6 ft 1 in (1.85 m)
- Listed weight: 195 lb (88 kg)

Career information
- High school: Miami Central (West Little River, Florida)
- College: Alabama State (1988–1991)
- NFL draft: 1992: undrafted

Career history
- Houston Oilers (1992–1994)

Awards and highlights
- Black college national champion (1991)

Career NFL statistics
- Receptions: 6
- Receiving yards: 64
- Stats at Pro Football Reference

Reginald Alonzo Brown (born May 5, 1970) is an American educator and former professional football player. A wide receiver, he was a standout athlete for the Alabama State Hornets, where he was a black college national champion, and later played two seasons in the National Football League (NFL) for the Houston Oilers. Following his football career, he became a teacher and school principal.

== Early life and college ==
Brown was born on May 5, 1970, in Miami, Florida. He attended Miami Central High School where he played football and ran track. He enrolled at Alabama State University in 1988 and began playing for the Alabama State Hornets football team. In 1989, as a sophomore, he caught 35 receptions for 614 yards; he scored the game-winning touchdown in the team's season-opener. However, in November, against Mississippi Valley State, he suffered a severe knee injury, tearing three ligaments and requiring reconstructive surgery. His coach, Houston Markham, initially thought Brown's career was over – Brown stated that "[My doctor] said a lot of people never even walk right again" after that kind of injury – but he rapidly recovered in what was described as "nothing short of miraculous", being ready in time to begin the 1990 season.

When Brown returned in the 1990 season, he totaled 48 catches for 815 yards and eight touchdowns. He remained a starter as a senior in 1991 and became the school's all-time leading receiver. He helped the team reach the Heritage Bowl where they defeated the North Carolina A&T Aggies, capping off an undefeated season with the Hornets being named black college national champions. He ended his collegiate career with 132 catches for 2,271 yards and 23 touchdowns; as of 2022 he still was second all-time in school history for career receptions, one behind Reggie Barlow.

Brown also was a high-jumper for the college track team. He was nicknamed "Downtown Reggie Brown".

== Professional career ==
After going unselected in the 1992 NFL draft, Brown signed with the Houston Oilers on May 26, 1992, as an undrafted free agent. He was released as part of the team's roster cuts, on August 24, 1992. He was signed to the Oilers' practice squad on September 25, where he remained for the rest of the season; he was re-signed in 1993. Brown ultimately made the final roster for the 1993 season. He made his NFL debut in the season-opener, being targeted once in a loss to the New Orleans Saints, then being inactive for the next two games. In Week 4, against the Los Angeles Rams, he was targeted twice and caught one pass for 26 yards in the loss. He caught one further pass against the New England Patriots in Week 7, saw limited playing time in Week 8 against the Cincinnati Bengals, and then was inactive for the rest of the year.

Brown was in a position to see more playing time in 1994 after an injury to starter Gary Wellman. He began the season with a career-high four catches for 34 yards against the Indianapolis Colts in Week 1; he also scored his only career points on a two-point conversion. However, he then caught no passes in Week 2, did not play in Week 3, and after recording no catches in Week 3 or Week 4, was inactive for the rest of the season. He was placed on injured reserve on December 23. Brown became a free agent after the season, on February 17, 1995, but re-signed on July 23, only to be released on August 27, 1995, after which he retired. An injury contributed to his retirement. He ended his career with six receptions for 64 yards in eight games played.

== Later life ==
Brown is married to Dr. Tammy Brown, and they have six daughters. After his football career, he returned to school; he has a Bachelor of Science in business and office administration from Alabama State, a Master of Education in school counseling and a Doctor of Education in educational leadership from Liberty University. He received training from the University of Texas in restorative discipline practices and became a special education teacher and school principal. As of 2022, he was the principal at Dulles Middle School in Texas, part of the Fort Bend Independent School District. He was the school's first African-American principal.

Brown is a member of the Kappa Alpha Psi fraternity. He was inducted into the Alabama State Athletic Hall of Fame in 2022.
