= Haywood Jeffires =

American football player (born 1964)

No. 84, 80
- Position: Wide receiver

Personal information
- Born: December 12, 1964 (age 61); Greensboro, North Carolina, U.S.
- Listed height: 6 ft 2 in (1.88 m)
- Listed weight: 210 lb (95 kg)

Career information
- High school: Page (Greensboro, North Carolina)
- College: NC State (1983–1986)
- NFL draft: 1987: 1st round, 20th overall pick

Career history
- Houston Oilers (1987–1995); New Orleans Saints (1996); Chicago Bears (1997)*
- * Offseason or practice squad member only

Awards and highlights
- First-team All-Pro (1991); 3× Pro Bowl (1991–1993); NFL receptions leader (1991)

Career NFL statistics
- Receptions: 535
- Receiving yards: 6,334
- Receiving touchdowns: 50
- Stats at Pro Football Reference

Haywood Franklin Jeffires (pronounced "Jeffries"; born December 12, 1964) is an American former professional football player who was a wide receiver in the National Football League (NFL) for 10 seasons. He was selected by the Houston Oilers in the first round (20th overall) of the 1987 NFL draft out of North Carolina State.

Jeffires spent his first nine seasons in the NFL with the Oilers, where he was selected to three consecutive Pro Bowls from 1991 to 1993. In 1991, Jeffires led the league in receptions and was a First-team All-Pro. He then spent the 1996 season with the New Orleans Saints.

== Biography ==
Jeffires was born in Greensboro, North Carolina and attended high school at Walter Hines Page High School and college at North Carolina State University. He finished his collegiate career with 111 receptions for 1,733 yards and 14 touchdowns.

Pre-draft measurables
Height	Weight	Arm length	Hand span	40-yard dash	10-yard split	20-yard split
6 ft 2 1/8 in (1.88 m)	191 lb (87 kg)	33 in (0.84 m)	9 in (0.23 m)	4.41 s	1.54 s	2.59 s
All values from NFL Combine

Jeffires was selected 20th overall by the Houston Oilers in the 1987 NFL draft. Jeffires played wide receiver for the Oilers from 1987 and 1995. He played most of his career with them during the "Run & Shoot" era with Warren Moon. The Run & Shoot also incorporated teammates Ernest Givins, Drew Hill, Webster Slaughter, and Curtis Duncan. A three-time Pro Bowl selection from 1991 to 1993, Jeffires led the NFL in receptions in 1991 with 100.

As of 2008, Jeffires is coaching the Bay Area Gamblers, a semipro football team in Pearland, Texas. Though his last name is spelled Jeffires, it is pronounced Jeffries, a fact that commentators often noted during broadcasts of games in which Jeffires was playing. The 1991 Nintendo Entertainment System console game, Tecmo Super Bowl, incorrectly listed Jeffires' name as "Jeffries".

Jeffires currently resides in suburban Houston with his wife, Robin, and their two children, Andrea and Haywood III. Jeffires remains beloved and active in the Houston community, devoting countless hours assisting special needs children, and is frequently tapped for personal appearances and interviews.

== NFL career statistics ==
Legend
	Led the league
**Bold**	Career high

=== Regular season ===
Year	Team	Games		Receiving				
Year	Team	GP	GS	Rec	Yds	Avg	Lng	TD
1987	HOU	9	1	7	89	12.7	23	0
1988	HOU	2	0	2	49	**24.5**	42	1
1989	HOU	16	4	47	619	13.2	45	2
1990	HOU	16	16	74	1,048	14.2	**87**	8
1991	HOU	16	16	**100**	**1,181**	11.8	44	7
1992	HOU	16	16	90	913	10.1	47	**9**
1993	HOU	16	16	66	753	11.4	66	6
1994	HOU	16	16	68	783	11.5	50	6
1995	HOU	16	16	61	684	11.2	35	8
1996	NO	9	1	20	215	10.8	27	3
Career		132	102	535	6,334	11.8	87	50

=== Postseason ===
Year	Team	Games		Receiving				
Year	Team	GP	GS	Rec	Yds	Avg	Lng	TD
1987	HOU	1	0	0	0	0.0	0	0
1988	HOU	2	0	8	130	16.3	35	0
1989	HOU	1	0	3	16	5.3	7	0
1990	HOU	1	1	2	33	**16.5**	23	0
1991	HOU	2	2	**11**	**148**	11.8	**49**	1
1992	HOU	1	1	8	98	12.3	32	**2**
1993	HOU	1	1	9	88	9.8	23	0
Career		9	5	41	513	12.5	49	3
