= Tim Roberts =

American football player (born 1969)

No. 68, 94
- Position: Defensive end

Personal information
- Born: April 14, 1969 (age 57); Atlanta, Georgia, U.S.
- Listed height: 6 ft 6 in (1.98 m)
- Listed weight: 318 lb (144 kg)

Career information
- College: Southern Miss
- NFL draft: 1992: 5th round, 136th overall pick

Career history
- Houston Oilers (1992–1994); New England Patriots (1995); Kansas City Chiefs (1997)*
- * Offseason or practice squad member only

Career NFL statistics
- Tackles: 73
- Sacks: 1
- Stats at Pro Football Reference

Tim Roberts (born April 14, 1969) is an American former professional football player who played defensive lineman for four seasons for the New England Patriots and Houston Oilers. He was selected by the Oilers in the fifth round of the 1992 NFL draft.
