= Drew Hill =

American football player (1956–2011)

No. 87, 85
- Position: Wide receiver

Personal information
- Born: October 5, 1956; Newnan, Georgia, U.S.
- Died: March 19, 2011 (aged 54); Atlanta, Georgia, U.S.
- Listed height: 5 ft 9 in (1.75 m)
- Listed weight: 170 lb (77 kg)

Career information
- High school: Newnan
- College: Georgia Tech
- NFL draft: 1979: 12th round, 328th overall pick

Career history
- Los Angeles Rams (1979–1984); Houston Oilers (1985–1991); Atlanta Falcons (1992–1993)

Awards and highlights
- 2× Pro Bowl (1988, 1990)

Career NFL statistics
- Receptions: 634
- Receiving yards: 9,831
- Receiving touchdowns: 60
- Stats at Pro Football Reference

Andrew Hill (October 5, 1956 – March 19, 2011) was an American professional football player who was a wide receiver in the National Football League (NFL). He was selected by the Los Angeles Rams in the 12th round of the 1979 NFL draft.

A 5 ft 9 in (1.75 m), 170 lb receiver from Georgia Tech, Hill played in 14 NFL seasons from 1979 to 1982 and from 1984 to 1993. As a member of the Houston Oilers, he set the team's record for most career pass receptions. He teamed with Ernest Givins, Curtis Duncan, Haywood Jeffires and Warren Moon in the Oilers' Run & Shoot offense. A two-time Pro Bowl selection in 1988 and 1990, Hill retired after the 1993 season as a member of the Atlanta Falcons.

== Early life ==
Hill played four years at Georgia Tech. He was used in a variety of offensive positions as a receiver/returner/back. His high in receiving was his senior year in 1978 when he caught 36 passes for 708 yards for four touchdowns. He also returned 19 kicks for 570 yards for an NCAA-leading 30.0 average. In four years combined, he scored fourteen touchdowns.

== Football career ==
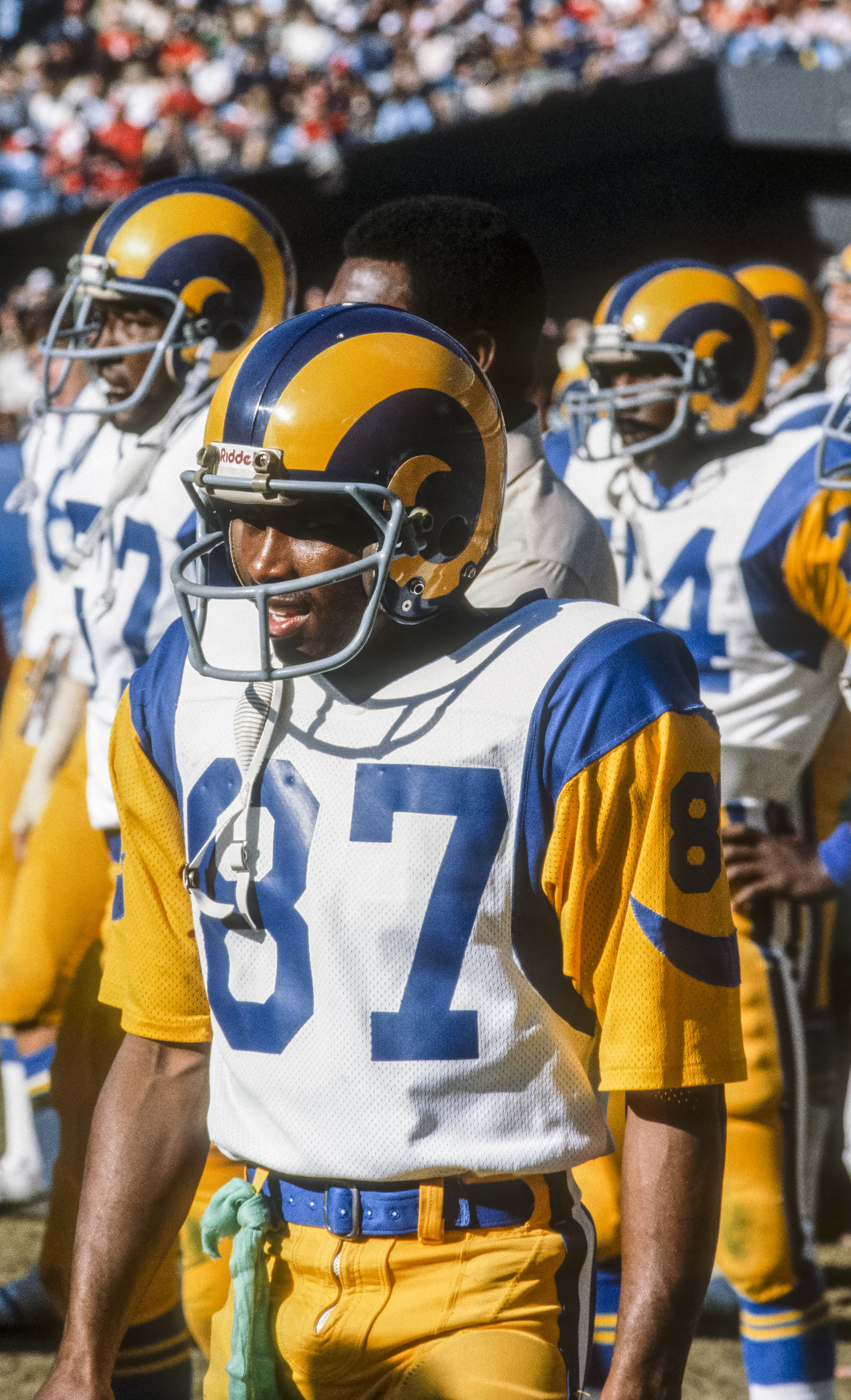
Drew Hill in Rams @ Falcons, 1982

Hill was drafted in the 12th round by the Los Angeles Rams in 1979 as the 328th pick of 330 players. He was utilized for kick returns in most of the games with occasional time at receiver. Against the Seattle Seahawks, he caught his first passes as a receiver (two) along with scoring his first touchdown. In total, he returned fourteen kicks for 803 yards. Hill saw limited action in the postseason for the Rams that year, which saw them advance all the way to Super Bowl XIV. He caught one pass for 28 yards in the Super Bowl against the Pittsburgh Steelers. It was his only Super Bowl appearance, which the Rams lost 31–19. Hill was used selectively again in 1980, catching 19 passes for 416 yards with two touchdowns while returning 43 kicks for 880 yards and a touchdown (from 98 yards out), which ended up being the only kick return touchdown of his career. He caught a total of 23 passes in the next two combined seasons for the Rams (while having more returns, most notably returning 60 for 1,170 yards in 1981) before missing the entire 1983 season due to injury; when he returned, he returned 26 kicks for 543 yards while catching 14 passes for 390 yards. In 1985, he was traded to the Houston Oilers for draft picks after the emergence of receivers such as Henry Ellard.

In Hill's first season with Houston, he had more receptions than he did in five seasons with the Rams (due to the quarterback being Warren Moon, the prolific passer acquired by the team in 1984), catching 64 passes for 1,169 yards with nine touchdowns while being a returner no longer. He had another 1,000-yard season the following year with 65 catches on 1,112 yards. Between 1985 and 1991, Hill had over 900 receiving yards in each season while having five 1,000-yard seasons. This included a career high 10 touchdowns in 1988, which saw him reach the Pro Bowl for the first time ever. This was due to Houston's all-out passing attack, with the "Run and Shoot" usually having four wideouts and one running back on every play. He went to the Pro Bowl again in 1990 with 74 catches on 1,019 yards for five touchdowns. On September 30 of that year, Hill became the first player to score a touchdown in three different decades (beating James Lofton by one game), while Hill accounted for 77 yards receiving in Warren Moon's record 527-yard passing performance against the Kansas City Chiefs on December 16. During the 1991 season, Hill became the first player to have four 1,000-yard seasons after the age of 30 (later surpassed by Jerry Rice). He closed out his career with Houston in 1991 with a career high 90 receptions for 1,109 yards. When Hill left the Oilers, he had the most receptions in franchise history with 480. He was later passed by his teammates Ernest Givins and Haywood Jeffires (Frank Wycheck later passed him as well); Hill ranks fourth in receptions along with second in yards to Givins and 3rd in touchdowns. In his final game as an Oiler in the 1992 postseason, Hill caught two passes for 21 yards, with his nine-yard reception from Moon giving the Oilers an early 14–0 lead over the Denver Broncos; it was Hill's first and only postseason touchdown. However, the Broncos won 26–24.

Hill joined the Atlanta Falcons as a free agent. Aged 36, he caught 30 passes for 623 yards with three touchdowns. As it turned out, Hill's touchdown reception against the Dallas Cowboys on December 21 was his final touchdown of his career. He closed his career out in 1993 with 34 catches for 384 yards. In his career, Hill caught 634 passes for 9,831 yards with 60 touchdowns. He also returned 172 kickoffs for 3,460 yards and one touchdown.

== NFL career statistics ==
Legend
**Bold**	Career high

=== Regular season ===
Year	Team	Games		Receiving				
Year	Team	GP	GS	Rec	Yds	Avg	Lng	TD
1979	RAM	**16**	4	4	94	23.5	43	1
1980	RAM	**16**	0	19	416	21.9	74	2
1981	RAM	**16**	2	16	355	22.2	45	3
1982	RAM	9	0	7	92	13.1	23	0
1984	RAM	**16**	**16**	14	390	**27.9**	68	4
1985	HOU	**16**	**16**	64	**1,169**	18.3	57	9
1986	HOU	**16**	**16**	65	1,112	17.1	**81**	5
1987	HOU	12	12	49	989	20.2	52	6
1988	HOU	**16**	**16**	72	1,141	15.8	57	**10**
1989	HOU	14	12	66	938	14.2	50	8
1990	HOU	**16**	**16**	74	1,019	13.8	57	5
1991	HOU	**16**	**16**	**90**	1,109	12.3	61	4
1992	ATL	**16**	14	60	623	10.4	43	3
1993	ATL	**16**	7	34	384	11.3	30	0
Career		211	147	634	9,831	15.5	81	60

=== Playoffs ===
Year	Team	Games		Receiving				
Year	Team	GP	GS	Rec	Yds	Avg	Lng	TD
1979	RAM	**3**	0	1	28	**28.0**	28	0
1980	RAM	1	0	0	0	0.0	0	0
1984	RAM	1	1	0	0	0.0	0	0
1987	HOU	2	**2**	**11**	**177**	16.1	24	0
1988	HOU	2	**2**	9	135	15.0	22	0
1989	HOU	1	1	6	98	16.3	**32**	0
1990	HOU	1	1	1	5	5.0	5	0
1991	HOU	2	**2**	**11**	98	8.9	20	**1**
Career		13	9	39	541	13.9	32	1

== Impersonation ==
An artist claiming to be Drew Hill was arrested and is currently serving time for armed robbery in the Los Angeles Men's Central Jail. The real Drew Hill was alerted to it by fans and the Los Angeles Times debunking the stories and the impersonator in 2010.

== Death ==
Drew Hill died in Atlanta, Georgia on March 19, 2011, at the age of 54, after two massive strokes.

== See also ==
- List of NCAA major college yearly punt and kickoff return leaders
