= Willis Peguese =

American football player (born 1966)

No. 72, 96
- Position: Defensive end

Personal information
- Born: December 18, 1966 (age 59); Miami, Florida, U.S.
- Listed height: 6 ft 4 in (1.93 m)
- Listed weight: 273 lb (124 kg)

Career information
- High school: Miami Southridge
- College: Miami (FL) (1986–1989)
- NFL draft: 1990: 3rd round, 72nd overall pick

Career history
- Houston Oilers (1990–1992); Indianapolis Colts (1992–1993)

Awards and highlights
- 2× National champion (1987, 1989)

Career NFL statistics
- Sacks: 2
- Stats at Pro Football Reference

Willis P. Peguese (born December 18, 1966) is an American former professional football player who was a defensive end for four seasons in the National Football League (NFL) with the Houston Oilers and Indianapolis Colts. He was selected by the Oilers in the third round of the 1990 NFL draft after playing college football at the University of Miami.

== Early life and college ==
Willis P. Peguese was born on December 18, 1966, in Miami, Florida. He attended Miami Southridge High School in Miami.

Peguese was a four-year letterman for the Miami Hurricanes of the University of Miami from 1986 to 1989. The Hurricanes were consensus national champions in both 1987 and 1989.

== Professional career ==
Peguese was selected by the Houston Oilers in the third round, with the 72nd overall pick, of the 1990 NFL draft. He officially signed with the team on July 22. He played in two games for the Oilers during the 1990 season before being placed on injured reserve on December 28, 1990. Peguese appeared in seven games in 1991 and was placed on injured reserve again on November 16, 1991. He made his first career start in the first game of the 1992 season, posting eight tackles, but was released afterward on September 11, 1992.

Peguese was claimed off waivers by the Indianapolis Colts on September 15, 1992. He played in 12 games for the Colts in 1992. He became a free agent after the 1992 season and re-signed with Indianapolis on July 22, 1993. He appeared in 13 games, starting four, in 1993 and recorded his only two career sacks. Peguese became a free agent after the 1993 season.
