= Kevin Gilbride =

American football coach (born 1951)

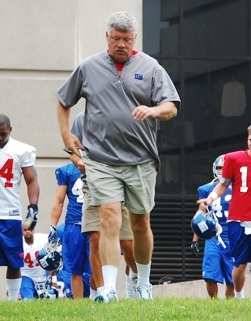
- Gilbride at New York Giants training camp in 2007

Personal information
- Born: August 27, 1951 (age 75); New Haven, Connecticut, U.S.

Career information
- Positions: Quarterback, tight end
- College: Southern Connecticut State (1970–1973)

Career history
- Idaho State (1974–1975) Linebackers coach; Tufts (1976–1977) Linebackers coach; American International (1978–1979) Defensive coordinator; Southern Connecticut State (1980–1984) Head coach; Ottawa Rough Riders (1985–1986) Assistant coach; East Carolina (1987–1988); Passing game coordinator (1987); Offensive coordinator (1988); Houston Oilers (1989–1994); Quarterbacks coach (1989); Offensive coordinator (1990–1994); Jacksonville Jaguars (1995–1996) Offensive coordinator; San Diego Chargers (1997–1998) Head coach; Pittsburgh Steelers (1999–2000) Offensive coordinator; Buffalo Bills (2002–2003) Offensive coordinator; New York Giants (2004–2013); Quarterbacks coach (2004–2006); Offensive coordinator (2007–2013); New York Guardians (2020) Head coach & general manager; TSL Jousters (2021) Head coach

Awards and highlights
- 2× Super Bowl champion (XLII, XLVI)

Head coaching record
- Regular season: 6–16 (.273)
- Coaching profile at Pro Football Reference

Kevin Bernard Gilbride (born August 27, 1951) is an American former football coach and player. He coached in the NFL for twenty years, spending seven of them as the offensive coordinator for the New York Giants, with whom he earned two Super Bowl rings. From 1997 to 1998, he was the head coach for the San Diego Chargers. Most recently, Gilbride served as the head coach for the New York Guardians of the XFL.

== Early life ==
Gilbride attended Southern Connecticut State University, where he played both quarterback and tight end and earned a degree in Physical Education. He then went to Idaho State University, where he earned a master's degree in athletic administration.

== College career ==
=== Idaho State ===
Gilbride's coaching career began in 1974 as a graduate assistant at Idaho State University, where he served as linebackers coach for the 1974 season. He was also the co-head coach for the Idaho State Bengals women's basketball in their inaugural year.

=== Tufts ===
Gilbride joined the coaching staff at Tufts University in Medford, Massachusetts prior to the 1976 season as a linebackers coach. He held that position for two seasons.

=== American International ===
Following the 1977 season, Gilbride moved on to American International College in Springfield, Massachusetts, where he was the defensive coordinator for two seasons.

=== Southern Connecticut State ===
Gilbride was the head football coach at his alma mater, Southern Connecticut State, for five seasons, from 1980 to 1984, compiling a record of 35–14.

=== East Carolina ===
Gilbride was the passing game coordinator at East Carolina University in 1987. The following season, he was promoted to offensive coordinator.

== Professional coaching career ==
=== Canadian Football League ===
==== Ottawa Rough Riders (1986) ====
Gilbride served as assistant coach for the Rough Riders in 1986. The team finished 7-9 but made the playoffs, where they lost in the eastern semi-final to the Montreal Concordes. The next season they were 3-10 and failed to qualify for the postseason.

=== National Football League ===
From 1989 to 2014, Gilbride served as an assistant with a number of NFL franchises, working as quarterbacks coach and offensive coordinator.

==== Quarterbacks coach (1989–1990) ====
Gilbride began his NFL career as a quarterbacks coach for the Oilers. In his first season, quarterback Warren Moon passed for over 3,600 yards with 23 touchdowns against 14 interceptions.

==== Offensive coordinator (1990–1994) ====
Following a solid year by Moon, the Oilers named Gilbride offensive coordinator for the 1990 season. During his time with the Oilers, Gilbride ran a variation of the run and shoot offense. The team finished in the top 5 in scoring each year with Gilbride as offensive coordinator. The team scored 405 points in Gilbride's first season, including Moon passing for 33 touchdowns against 13 interceptions for over 4,000 yards. Despite the offense finishing second in the league, the team finished 9–7, second in the division.

The next season, the Oilers finished 11–5 to win the division. Gilbride's offense finished fourth in the league with 386 points, the fourth ranked offense in the league and second in yards.

The 1992 season saw Houston finish with a 10–6 record, second to the Pittsburgh Steelers. Gilbride's offense scored 352 points, good for sixth in the league. In the classic 1992 AFC wild card game against the Buffalo Bills, dubbed "The Comeback" by Bills fans, the Oilers led 28–3 at halftime, but Buffalo scored 38 unanswered points to capture the victory.

During this season, Gilbride was diagnosed with a rare form of kidney cancer. He had surgery on December 10. Injured quarterback Warren Moon, along with wide receiver coach Chris Palmer, stepped in as acting offensive coordinators.

After a 1–4 start, the Oilers won its final eleven games to finish the 1993 season at 12–4 and clinched a first-round bye in the playoffs. The offense ranked fourth in the league with 368 points. Gilbride's use of the run and shoot offense was criticized throughout the campaign by first-year Oilers defensive coordinator Buddy Ryan, who called the system the "chuck and duck." Ryan threw a punch at Gilbride on the sidelines after Cody Carlson committed a fumble instead of running out the clock with 37 seconds left in the first half and the Oilers leading 14–0 in a nationally televised 24–0 win over the New York Jets in the regular season finale at the Astrodome on January 2, 1994. "Kevin Gilbride will be selling insurance in two years," Ryan said a few days after the incident. In an episode of A Football Life chronicling the 1993 Oilers, Gilbride said of his experience with the punch, "Through all the things you've been fortunate to be part of, that you're proud of, this is the last thing you want to be considered attached to for the rest of your life, but it happened." The Oilers lost to the Kansas City Chiefs 28–20 in a home divisional round match two weeks later on January 16.

The 1994 Oilers finished with a dismal 2–14 record, and the last-ranked offense in the league.

==== Jacksonville Jaguars (1995–1996) ====
For their inaugural season in 1995, the Jaguars hired Tom Coughlin as head coach and Gilbride as offensive coordinator. The team finished 4–12, scoring just 275 points, 27th in the league. The following year in 1996, the team went 9-7 scoring 325 points, fourteenth in the league, but second in yards. The Jaguars defeated the Buffalo Bills in the AFC Wild Card Game 30–27, and then the Denver Broncos in the AFC Divisional Game by the same score, but lost to the New England Patriots in the AFC Championship Game 20–6. Following the season, Gilbride was hired by the San Diego Chargers to fill their head coach position vacated after Bobby Ross stepped down.

==== San Diego Chargers (1997–1998) ====
In his first season as head coach, Gilbride's Chargers finished 4–12, scoring just 266 points (26th in the league) while allowing 425 (last in the league). The following year was not much better, as the team scored 241 points (29th in the league), and finished 29th in the league. Gilbride was fired on October 14, 1998.

==== Pittsburgh Steelers (1999–2000) ====
On January 7, 1999, Gilbride was hired as offensive coordinator for the Steelers. The team scored 317 points and finished 6–10, with the 17th ranked offense and 22nd in yards. The next year, the team improved to 9–7, with the 17th ranked offense in the league, scoring 321 points. Following the 2000 season, Gilbride was fired.

==== Out of the League–broadcasting (2001) ====
Gilbride was hired by ESPN in 2001, where he served as an NFL analyst for that season.

==== Buffalo Bills (2002–2003) ====
Following a season where they finished 13th in the league in total offense, the Bills hired Gilbride on February 9, 2002. The Bills finished 8-8, scoring 379 points, but set seven team records. The following year, the team finished 6–10, and 30th in the league in total points with just 243. Gilbride left the team after being hired by the New York Giants on January 26, 2004.

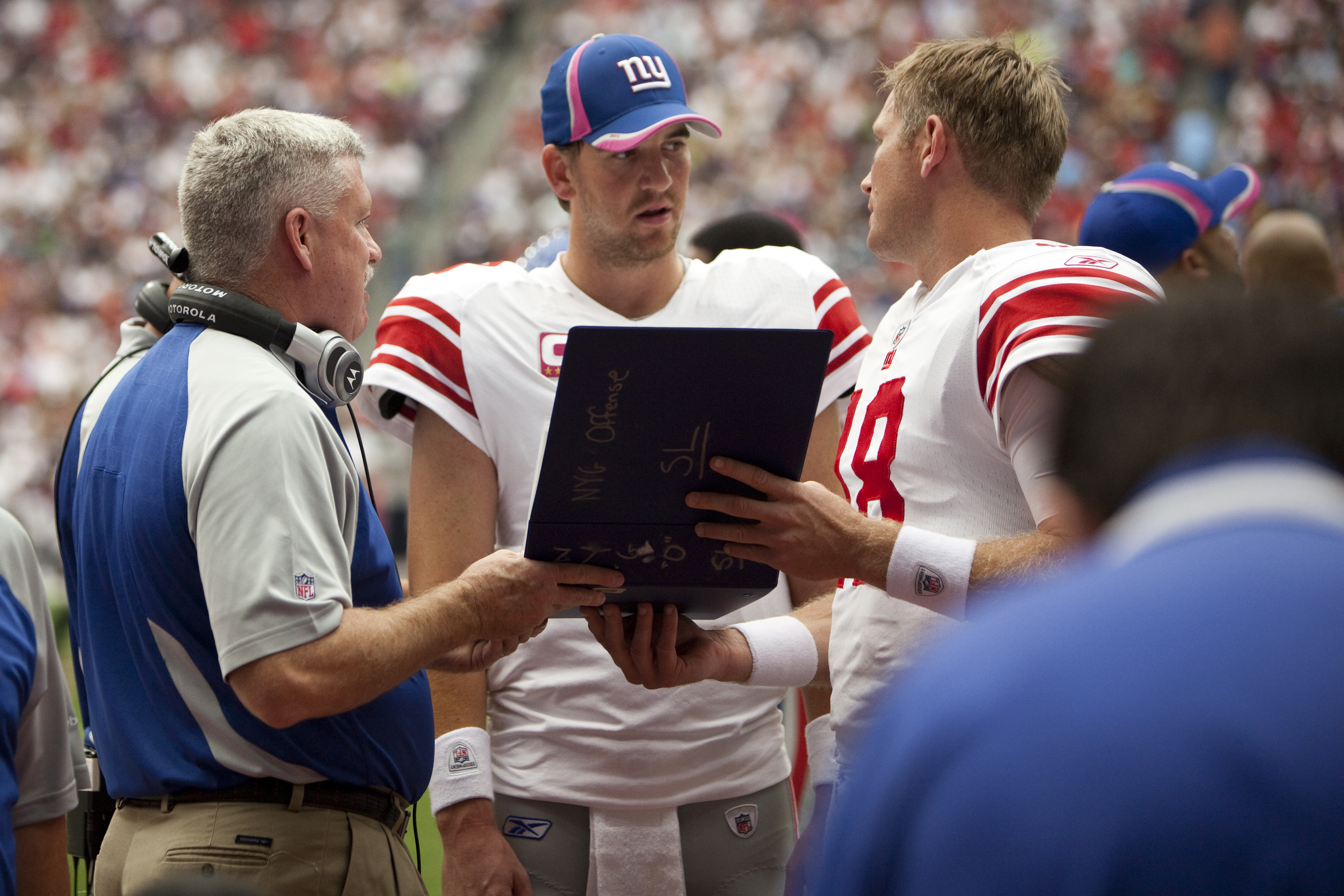
Gilbride (left) with Eli Manning in 2010

==== Quarterbacks coach (2004–2006) ====
In 2004, Gilbride was reunited with Tom Coughlin in New York, where he became the Giants' quarterbacks coach. He worked with Eli Manning in that position for three years, during which Manning, after replacing Kurt Warner, led the Giants to a 1–6 record, leaving the team with an overall 6–10 record. He subsequently improved in 2005 to lead the team to an 11–5 record, capturing not only their first playoff berth since 2002, but their first division title since 2000. However, the Giants were eliminated by the Carolina Panthers in the first round. The Giants returned to the playoffs in 2006 but were ousted in the first round by the Philadelphia Eagles. Following that season, the Giants announced that the entire coaching staff would return on one-year contracts for the 2007 season.

==== Offensive coordinator (2006–2013) ====
Midway in the 2006 season, Gilbride was named interim offensive coordinator. The "interim" tag was removed following the season, and on January 18, 2007, Gilbride was officially announced as the offensive coordinator. In his first full season in 2007, the Giants went 10–6 and defeated the heavily favored Green Bay Packers on a Lawrence Tynes field goal in overtime of the NFC Championship Game to set up a trip to Super Bowl XLII against the undefeated New England Patriots. In what is called one of the greatest upsets of all time, the Giants won 17–14 to capture their third Super Bowl title.

Under Gilbride, the Giants had four years where their offense had scored 400 or more points.

In 2008, the Giants finished with a 12–4 record, but were ousted in the divisional round of the playoffs by the Philadelphia Eagles. Gilbride's offense scored 427 points, third in the NFL.

In 2008, the Oakland Raiders received permission to interview Gilbride for their vacant head coach position. The job eventually went to Tom Cable.

In 2009, the Giants fell to 8–8, yet still scored 402 points, good for eighth in the league, and the fourth highest total in team history.

In 2010, the Giants improved to 10–6, starting 6–2. However, a rash of injuries down the stretch doomed the Giants as they once again missed the playoffs. Despite the poor finish, the Giants had the seventh ranked offense in points and fifth in yards.

Following a tumultuous free agency period and some bad injuries prior to the season, the Giants began 2011 with a loss against the Washington Redskins. By the bye week, they had a 4–2 record after defeating the Buffalo Bills in week 6. The team had a 6–2 record by week 9, which fell to 7–7 after a week 15 loss to the Redskins. However, they won a Christmas Eve game against the crosstown rival New York Jets, followed by a Week 17 game to sweep the Dallas Cowboys in the season series.

In the first round of the playoffs, they handily defeated the Atlanta Falcons 24–2, holding them to a first quarter safety being their only score. This was followed by a 37–20 divisional win against the Green Bay Packers, and set up another NFC Championship game appearance. The Giants faced the San Francisco 49ers in a game that ended 20–17 with Lawrence Tynes kicking a game-winner to send the Giants to the Super Bowl.

In Super Bowl XLVI, the Giants once again faced the New England Patriots, and as they had four years prior, they defeated New England 21–17 to capture their fourth title. For the season, they finished 9th in the league in offense, scoring 394 points while allowing 400. Gilbride earned his second Super Bowl ring after the victory.

For the 2012 season, the Giants finished 9–7 once again, but missed the playoffs. They scored 429 points, sixth in the league, but missed the playoffs again despite starting 6–4, going 3–3 after the bye week.

In 2013, the Giants began 0–6, causing many people to question Gilbride's future with the team. the team rebounded, however, and won 7 of their final 10 games. Despite Gilbride's two Super Bowl rings with the team, fans had grown impatient with the offense. At the end of the season, owner John Mara said "I think our offense is broken right now. We need to fix that".

On January 2, 2014, it was announced that Gilbride would retire.

=== XFL ===
==== New York Guardians (2020) ====
On April 16, 2019, Gilbride was introduced as the first head coach of the XFL's New York team, later named the New York Guardians. In his only season as coach, the Guardians finished 3–2, were undefeated at home, and finished first in the division.

== Head coaching record ==
=== College ===
Year	Team	Overall	Conference	Standing	Bowl/playoffs
Southern Connecticut State Owls (NCAA Division II independent) (1980–1984)
1980	Southern Connecticut State	5–4–1			
1981	Southern Connecticut State	6–3–1			
1982	Southern Connecticut State	9–1			
1983	Southern Connecticut State	8–3			
1984	Southern Connecticut State	7–3			
Southern Connecticut State:		35–14–2			
Total:		35–14–2			

=== NFL ===
Team	Year	Regular season					Postseason			
Team	Year	Won	Lost	Ties	Win %	Finish	Won	Lost	Win %	Result
SD	1997	4	12	0	.250	4th in AFC West	-	-	-	-
SD	1998	2	4	0	.333	Fired	-	-	-	-
SD Total		6	16	0	.273		0	0	–	
Total		6	16	0	.273		0	0	–	

=== XFL ===
Team	Year	Regular season					Postseason			
Team	Year	Won	Lost	Ties	Win %	Finish	Won	Lost	Win %	Result
NYG	2020	3	2	0	.600	T-1st in XFL East	0	0	.000	TBD
Total		3	2	0	.600		0	0	.000	

=== The Spring League ===
Team	Year	Regular season					Postseason			
Team	Year	Won	Lost	Ties	Win %	Finish	Won	Lost	Win %	Result
Jousters	2021	4	2	0	.667	1st in TSL South	0	1	.000	Lost to Linemen in Mega Bowl
Total		4	2	0	.667		0	1	.000	

== Personal life ==
Gilbride and his wife, Deborah, have three children: daughters Kelly and Kristen and son, Kevin M. Gilbride. Kelly is a 1998 graduate of Harvard University, Kristen graduated from the University of Connecticut in 1999, and the younger Kevin graduated from the University of Hawaii in 2003 and was a former NFL tight ends coach for the New York Giants (2010–17, Chicago Bears (2018–19) and Carolina Panthers (2021–22). He is the current tight ends coach at Brigham Young University.
