= Pat Coleman =

American football player (born 1967)

No. 87, 47, 82
- Position: Wide receiver

Personal information
- Born: April 8, 1967 (age 59); Cleveland, Mississippi, U.S.
- Listed height: 5 ft 7 in (1.70 m)
- Listed weight: 176 lb (80 kg)

Career information
- High school: Cleveland
- College: Mississippi
- NFL draft: 1990: 9th round, 237th overall pick

Career history
- Houston Oilers (1990); New England Patriots (1990); Houston Oilers (1990–1994); Toronto Argonauts (1995)

Career NFL statistics
- Receptions: 42
- Receiving yards: 575
- Touchdowns: 2
- Stats at Pro Football Reference

Patrick Darryl Coleman (born April 8, 1967) is an American former professional football player who was a wide receiver for five seasons in the National Football League (NFL). He played college football for the Ole Miss Rebels before being selected by the Houston Oilers in the ninth round of the 1990 NFL draft with the 237th overall pick. He played in the NFL for the Oilers and New England Patriots. He also played for the Toronto Argonauts of the Canadian Football League (CFL).
