= Eric Fairs =

American football player (born 1964)

No. 51
- Position: Linebacker

Personal information
- Born: February 17, 1964 (age 62); Memphis, Tennessee, U.S.
- Listed height: 6 ft 3 in (1.91 m)
- Listed weight: 240 lb (109 kg)

Career information
- High school: Northside (Memphis, Tennessee)
- College: Memphis
- NFL draft: 1986: undrafted

Career history
- Houston Oilers (1986–1991); Buffalo Bills (1992)*; Atlanta Falcons (1992)
- * Offseason or practice squad member only

Career NFL statistics
- Sacks: 2.5
- Fumble recoveries: 4
- Safeties: 1
- Stats at Pro Football Reference

Eric Fairs (born February 17, 1964) is an American former professional football player who played linebacker for seven seasons for the Houston Oilers and Atlanta Falcons. 1983, 1984 Second team all-south independent, 1985 First Team All-South independent
