= Scott Kozak =

American football player (born 1965)

No. 56
- Position: Linebacker

Personal information
- Born: November 28, 1965 (age 60); Hillsboro, Oregon, U.S.
- Listed height: 6 ft 3 in (1.91 m)
- Listed weight: 226 lb (103 kg)

Career information
- High school: Colton (Colton, Oregon)
- College: Oregon
- NFL draft: 1989: 2nd round, 50th overall pick

Career history
- Houston Oilers (1989–1993)

Awards and highlights
- Second-team All-Pac-10 (1988)

Career NFL statistics
- Sacks: 0.5
- Fumble recoveries: 2
- Stats at Pro Football Reference

Scott Allen Kozak (born November 28, 1965) is an American former professional football player who was a linebacker for five seasons with the Houston Oilers of the National Football League (NFL) from 1989 to 1993. He was selected by the Oilers in the second round of the 1989 NFL draft with the 50th overall pick. Kozak played college football for the Oregon Ducks. He was named Oregon's most outstanding football player for the 1989 season.
