= Bo Orlando =

American football player (born 1966)

No. 26, 21
- Position: Safety

Personal information
- Born: April 3, 1966 (age 60); Berwick, Pennsylvania, U.S.
- Listed height: 5 ft 10 in (1.78 m)
- Listed weight: 180 lb (82 kg)

Career information
- High school: Berwick
- College: West Virginia
- NFL draft: 1989: 6th round, 157th overall pick

Career history
- Houston Oilers (1989–1994); San Diego Chargers (1995); Cincinnati Bengals (1996–1997); Pittsburgh Steelers (1998)

Awards and highlights
- First-team All-American (1988); First-team All-East (1988); WVU Sports Hall of Fame

Career NFL statistics
- Tackles: 301
- Interceptions: 10
- Forced fumbles: 3
- Stats at Pro Football Reference

Joseph John "Bo" Orlando (born April 3, 1966) is an American former professional football player who was a safety in the National Football League (NFL). He played college football for the West Virginia Mountaineers. He was selected by the Houston Oilers in the sixth round of the 1989 NFL draft.

In his career, he also played for the San Diego Chargers, Cincinnati Bengals, and Pittsburgh Steelers.

== Early life ==
Orlando played quarterback and defensive back at Berwick High School in Pennsylvania. He led his team to a 13–0 season during his senior year and a #1 ranking on the USA Today Top 25 in 1983.

== College career ==
Orlando played quarterback in high school, but when the West Virginia Mountaineers recruited him, they moved him to strong-safety. He helped lead the Mountaineers to their undefeated 1988 season, and is one of the greatest defensive backs to play for West Virginia University. In 1987 against East Carolina, Orlando had an interception that he returned 67 yards for a touchdown, which is the fifth longest interception return in school history.

== Professional career ==
Orlando was selected 157th overall, sixth round in the 1989 NFL draft by the Houston Oilers. He played five seasons with the Oilers, into 1994, recording seven interceptions and returning one for a touchdown. He then played one season with the Chargers, two with the Bengals, and his last season in 1998 with the Steelers.

Orlando totaled two sacks and ten interceptions in his career.

== Personal life ==
He is of Italian-American descent and as of 2012, Orlando is involved with a startup sports clothing apparel company. He is also an assistant coach at his son's high school in Bethlehem, Pennsylvania. Recently, in 2019, Orlando became athletic director of his Alma mater, Berwick Area Senior High School.
