= Cody Carlson =

American football player (born 1963)

No. 14,11
- Position: Quarterback

Personal information
- Born: November 5, 1963 (age 63); Dallas, Texas, U.S.
- Listed height: 6 ft 3 in (1.91 m)
- Listed weight: 202 lb (92 kg)

Career information
- High school: Winston Churchill (San Antonio, Texas)
- College: Baylor
- NFL draft: 1987: 3rd round, 64th overall pick

Career history
- Houston Oilers (1987–1994)

Awards and highlights
- Second-team All-SWC (1986)

Career NFL statistics
- Passing attempts: 659
- Passing completions: 370
- Completion percentage: 56.1%
- TD–INT: 21–28
- Passing yards: 4,469
- Passer rating: 70
- Rushing yards: 217
- Rushing touchdowns: 4
- Stats at Pro Football Reference

Matthew Cody Carlson (born November 5, 1963) is an American former professional football player who spent his entire eight year career as a quarterback for the Houston Oilers of the National Football League (NFL). He played college football for the Baylor Bears was selected by the Houston Oilers in the third round of the 1987 NFL draft. Carlson played for the Oilers from 1987 to 1994. His nickname while with the team was Commander Cody.

== NFL career ==
Pre-draft measurables
Height	Weight	Arm length	Hand span	40-yard dash	10-yard split	20-yard split	20-yard shuttle	Vertical jump
6 ft 3 in (1.91 m)	191 lb (87 kg)	31 in (0.79 m)	9 1/4 in (0.23 m)	4.82 s	1.63 s	2.72 s	4.45 s	29.5 in (0.75 m)
All values from NFL Combine

Carlson began his career with the Houston Oilers as a backup to Warren Moon, and his most productive season was during the 1992 season due to Moon getting injured. He passed for 1,710 yards in 11 games (6 starts). Overall, he was on Houston teams with a 10–4 record as a starter during his years as Moon's backup. Moon departed after the 1993 season with Carlson named as his starting replacement. However, he lasted only five games into the 1994 season, posting a 1–4 record and 44.7 completion percentage before he suffered an injury and missed the remainder of the year. The Oilers ended the season with a horrible 2–14 record. The coaching change in the middle of the 1994 season signaled a new direction for the Oilers, and, with Carlson coming off his injury, the team opted to let him go. He retired after the 1994 NFL season.

He now lives in Austin, Texas.
