= List of nicknamed NFL games and plays =

This is a list of several dozen National Football League (NFL) games and plays that have been given names by the media, football fans, and as part of a team's lore because of a distinctive play, unusual outcome, or other circumstance. This list does not include games named only for their position in the NFL playoff structure—e.g., the 1963 AFL Championship or Super Bowl XXXI.

== Named NFL games ==
Name	Date	Away team	Score	Home team	Notes
Iron Man Game	December 4, 1932	Green Bay Packers	0–19	Portsmouth Spartans	Spartans coach Potsy Clark refused to make even a single substitution against the defending NFL champion Packers. Portsmouth won 19–0 and used only 11 players for the entire game.
First NFL Championship Game	December 18, 1932	Portsmouth Spartans	0–9	Chicago Bears	Because the Spartans and Bears were tied in the standings at the end of the season, the NFL voted to hold the first official playoff game in Chicago at Wrigley Field. Due to severe winter conditions before the game, the game was held indoors at Chicago Stadium which forced some temporary rule changes, such as a modified 80-yard dirt field.
The Sneakers Game	December 9, 1934	Chicago Bears	13–30	New York Giants	1934 NFL Championship Game. Giants players switched to basketball sneakers in the middle of the game.
73–0	December 8, 1940	Chicago Bears	73–0	Washington Redskins	The Chicago Bears scored 11 touchdowns and won 73–0, the most lopsided victory in NFL history.
The Greatest Game Ever Played	December 28, 1958	Baltimore Colts	23–17	New York Giants	First NFL playoff game to be decided in sudden death overtime. Marked the beginning of the NFL's popularity surge and eventual rise to the top of the United States sports market.
Ice Bowl	December 31, 1967	Dallas Cowboys	17–21	Green Bay Packers	1967 NFL Championship Game. The coldest NFL game ever played, with a wind chill of −36 °F (−38 °C).
Heidi Game	November 17, 1968	New York Jets	32–43	Oakland Raiders	Broadcaster NBC chose to break coverage in the East Coast to broadcast the television film Heidi, causing many viewers to miss the Raiders' two-touchdown comeback.
The Santa Claus Game	December 15, 1968	Minnesota Vikings	24–17	Philadelphia Eagles	Eagles fans upset by their team's poor season used snowballs to pelt a Santa Claus actor in a halftime Christmas parade.
The Guarantee	January 12, 1969	New York Jets	16–7	Baltimore Colts	Super Bowl III. 19-1/2-point underdog American Football League (AFL) champion New York Jets upset the NFL champion Baltimore Colts, after Jets quarterback Joe Namath guaranteed his team's victory.
The Longest Game Ever	December 25, 1971	Miami Dolphins	27–24	Kansas City Chiefs	The Dolphins won in double overtime against the Chiefs in what is the longest game ever played in the NFL and professional football history, lasting 82 minutes and 40 seconds of game time.
The Flu Game	November 20, 1977	Minnesota Vikings	7–10	Chicago Bears	In a 10–7 victory against the Minnesota Vikings, Chicago Bears running back Walter Payton set an NFL record with 275 rushing yards, as well as the Bears' only touchdown in the game despite having the flu.
Mud Bowl	December 26, 1977	Minnesota Vikings	14–7	Los Angeles Rams	A torrential downpour turned the field into a muddy mess, making for an extremely sloppy game between both teams. Vikings running back Chuck Foreman willed the Vikings to the win, carrying the ball 31 times for 101 yards and a touchdown in a 14–7 ballgame.
Chester Marcol Game	September 7, 1980	Chicago Bears	6–12	Green Bay Packers	Green Bay Packers kicker Chester Marcol scores a walk-off touchdown after recovering his own blocked field goal attempt and running into the end zone in overtime.
Announcerless Game	December 20, 1980	New York Jets	24–17	Miami Dolphins	NBC game broadcast without commentators as an experiment.
Duel in Dixie	January 4, 1981	Dallas Cowboys	30–27	Atlanta Falcons	Down by 14 points in the fourth quarter, the Dallas Cowboys would outscore the Atlanta Falcons 20–3, including a go-ahead touchdown with 23 seconds remaining to win 30–27.
Epic in Miami	January 2, 1982	San Diego Chargers	41–38	Miami Dolphins	Exceptional performances by players on both teams produced 79 combined points in this 1981-82 NFL playoff game, setting numerous NFL records.
Freezer Bowl	January 10, 1982	San Diego Chargers	7–27	Cincinnati Bengals	1981 AFC Championship Game. Coldest game temperature in NFL history by wind chill: −59 °F (−51 °C) under the calculation method then in use.
Snowplow Game	December 12, 1982	Miami Dolphins	0–3	New England Patriots	A snowplow operator cleared snow in front of New England kicker John Smith at the request of Patriots head coach Ron Meyer, enabling a game-winning but controversial field goal.
Snowball Game (1985)	November 11, 1985	San Francisco 49ers	16–17	Denver Broncos	Spectators at Denver's Mile High Stadium disrupted a 49ers' field goal attempt by throwing snowballs from the stands, helping the Denver Broncos to win.
Snow Bowl (1985)	December 1, 1985	Tampa Bay Buccaneers	0–21	Green Bay Packers	Played as a snowstorm dropped more than 14 inches (36 cm) of snow before, during, and after the game.
Fog Bowl	December 31, 1988	Philadelphia Eagles	12–20	Chicago Bears	Dense fog rolled over Chicago's Soldier Field during the 2nd quarter, cutting visibility to 15 to 20 yards for the rest of the game and preventing many players from seeing the sidelines or first-down markers.
Instant Replay Game	November 5, 1989	Chicago Bears	13–14	Green Bay Packers	A penalty call was overturned by using instant replay, allowing a game-winning Green Bay Packers touchdown to stand against their division rival Chicago Bears.
Bounty Bowl	November 23, 1989	Philadelphia Eagles	27–0	Dallas Cowboys	Notable for allegations that the Eagles put a $200 bounty on Cowboys kicker Luis Zendejas, who had been cut by Philadelphia earlier that season.
Bounty Bowl II	December 10, 1989	Dallas Cowboys	10–20	Philadelphia Eagles	Rematch of Bounty Bowl I. Eagles fans threw objects at Cowboys players and coaches, game officials, and game announcers.
Body Bag Game	November 12, 1990	Washington Redskins	14–28	Philadelphia Eagles	Nine Washington Redskins (now Washington Commanders) players left with injuries.
No Punt Game	September 13, 1992	Buffalo Bills	34–31	San Francisco 49ers	First NFL game without a punt by either team. Featured multiple future Hall of Famers; widely regarded as one of the NFL's best games.
The Comeback	January 3, 1993	Houston Oilers	38–41	Buffalo Bills	During this 1992–93 playoff game, the Buffalo Bills overcame a 35–3 deficit to defeat the visiting Houston Oilers 41–38 in overtime—the largest comeback in NFL history until the 2022 NFL season.
Snowball Game (1995)	December 23, 1995	San Diego Chargers	27–17	New York Giants	After a snowstorm, fans threw snowballs in the stands and onto the field. The Giants were nearly forced to forfeit the game.
Ambush at Mile High	January 4, 1997	Jacksonville Jaguars	30–27	Denver Broncos	The Jacksonville Jaguars performed a historic upset against the Denver Broncos, in which the Broncos were 14-point favorites entering the matchup.
Bert Emanuel Catch Game	January 23, 2000	Tampa Bay Buccaneers	6–11	St. Louis Rams	Down 11–6 in the 1999 NFC Championship Game, Buccaneers wide receiver Bert Emanuel made a huge 13-yard catch with 47 seconds left to give Tampa Bay a chance to win, but the referees overturned the catch, and Tampa Bay went on to lose. As a result, the rulebook was changed the following offseason, and "The Bert Emanuel Rule" was created.
Pickle Juice Game	September 3, 2000	Philadelphia Eagles	41–14	Dallas Cowboys	Due to high temperatures in Texas, the Eagles used pickle juice to help keep the team hydrated.
T.O. Star Game	September 24, 2000	San Francisco 49ers	41–24	Dallas Cowboys	After scoring a touchdown, 49ers wide receiver Terrell Owens immediately ran out to midfield and celebrated on the Cowboys star logo resting on the 50-yard line, which included him placing the football in the center. After doing it a second time, Cowboys safety George Teague slammed Owens in response.
Monday Night Miracle	October 23, 2000	Miami Dolphins	37–40	New York Jets	In a Monday Night Football game between the Miami Dolphins and New York Jets, the Jets came back with 23 unanswered points in the fourth quarter to tie the game at 30, winning in overtime.
Bottlegate	December 16, 2001	Jacksonville Jaguars	15–10	Cleveland Browns	Browns fans threw beer bottles and other objects onto the field after referees overturned a Browns 4th-down conversion made two plays earlier. This decision, which violated NFL rules, ended the game early.
Tuck Rule Game	January 19, 2002	Oakland Raiders	13–16	New England Patriots	2001 AFC Divisional Playoff game in which a Patriots fumble was ruled an incomplete pass by officials because Patriots quarterback Tom Brady appeared to "tuck" the ball in. The Patriots won the game, and then Super Bowl XXXVI.
Quadrafecta Game	September 29, 2002	Houston Texans	17–35	Philadelphia Eagles	Against the Houston Texans, Philadelphia Eagles safety Brian Dawkins became the only player to record a sack, interception, fumble recovery, and touchdown catch in the same game.
The Controversial Comeback	January 5, 2003	New York Giants	38–39	San Francisco 49ers	Down 38–14 in a Wild Card playoff game against the Giants, the 49ers would come from behind to take a 39–38 lead with a little over a minute left, giving the Giants one last drive and an opportunity to kick a walk-off field goal to win the game. Due to a bad snap, the Giants' holder was forced to throw a pass towards the end zone, and guard Rich Seubert was tripped up before the ball could get to him, making it pass interference on the 49ers. However, Seubert was flagged for being an ineligible receiver downfield despite reporting as eligible before the field goal attempt, ending the game.
Monday Night Miracle (2003)	October 6, 2003	Indianapolis Colts	38–35	Tampa Bay Buccaneers	In Week 5 of the 2003 season, the defending Super Bowl champion Tampa Bay Buccaneers hosted the Indianapolis Colts on Monday Night Football. Down 35–14 with 5:09 remaining in the game, the Colts miraculously scored 21 unanswered points against the league's top defense to force overtime, where they would win 38–35 on a walk-off field goal, which was controversially redone after a missed attempt due to a leaping penalty by Simeon Rice.
Favre's Dad Game	December 22, 2003	Green Bay Packers	41–7	Oakland Raiders	Packers quarterback Brett Favre threw for 399 yards and 4 touchdown passes the day after his father died of a heart attack. The game kept the Packers' playoff hopes alive and extended Favre's consecutive-start record.
"We want the ball and we're going to score!"	January 4, 2004	Seattle Seahawks	27–33	Green Bay Packers	2003 NFC Wild-Card Playoff Game in which Seahawks' quarterback Matt Hasselbeck won the overtime coin toss; proclaimed, "We want the ball and we're going to score!"; and threw a game-losing pick-six.
The Night Courage Wore Orange	December 20, 2004	New England Patriots	28–29	Miami Dolphins	In a Monday Night Football game between the defending Super Bowl champion New England Patriots and the Miami Dolphins, the Dolphins, wearing orange uniforms, upset the heavily favored Patriots.
Monday Night Miracle (2005)	September 19, 2005	Washington Redskins	14–13	Dallas Cowboys	After being shutout for most of the game and being down by 13 points, the Redskins scored two touchdowns in less than two minutes to win the game.
Fútbol Americano	October 2, 2005	San Francisco 49ers	14–31	Arizona Cardinals	Marketing name for the first NFL game held outside the United States, at Estadio Azteca in Mexico City.
Monday Night Massacre	December 5, 2005	Seattle Seahawks	42–0	Philadelphia Eagles	In a Monday Night Football game between the Seattle Seahawks and the Philadelphia Eagles, the Seahawks dominated the entire game, forcing six turnovers, including two pick-sixes and a scoop-and-score, resulting in the largest shutout win in Monday Night Football history.
Manning Bowl	September 10, 2006	Indianapolis Colts	26–21	New York Giants	The first game in which the Manning Brothers, Peyton and Eli, played against each other.
"Rebirth"	September 25, 2006	Atlanta Falcons	3–23	New Orleans Saints	The first game played at the Louisiana Superdome following Hurricane Katrina.
Monday Night Meltdown	October 16, 2006	Chicago Bears	24–23	Arizona Cardinals	Bears won after trailing by 20 points at halftime; notable post-game rant by Cardinals head coach Dennis Green.
The Queen City Comeback	November 12, 2006	San Diego Chargers	49–41	Cincinnati Bengals	The Chargers overcame a 28–7 deficit on the road to beat the Cincinnati Bengals 49–41.
Monday Night Mud Bowl	November 26, 2007	Miami Dolphins	0–3	Pittsburgh Steelers	Before a Monday Night Football game between the Miami Dolphins and the Pittsburgh Steelers, a monsoon hit the area, and due to the playing surface being grass instead of turf, the entire field was muddy. The whole game was scoreless for over 59 minutes before Jeff Reed kicked the game-winning field goal with 17 seconds remaining.
The Smith Guarantee	December 9, 2007	Pittsburgh Steelers	13–34	New England Patriots	Before a game between the Steelers and the undefeated Patriots, Steelers defensive end Anthony Smith guaranteed a Steelers victory. The Patriots would then go on to win 34–13.
A Preview to History	December 29, 2007	New England Patriots	38–35	New York Giants	A Week 17 game between the Patriots and Giants that was a preview of the Super Bowl that year, where the Giants upset the Patriots, who had gone undefeated in the regular season.
Snow Globe Game	January 12, 2008	Seattle Seahawks	20–42	Green Bay Packers	2007 NFC Divisional playoff game in which the Packers mounted their largest comeback in playoff franchise history.
Torn ACL Game	January 20, 2008	San Diego Chargers	12–21	New England Patriots	In the 2007 AFC Championship Game, Chargers quarterback Philip Rivers played the entire game on a torn ACL, making it widely considered one of the gutsiest performances in NFL history.
Steel City Scorefest	December 20, 2009	Green Bay Packers	36–37	Pittsburgh Steelers	High scoring game between the Packers and Steelers, when Ben Roethlisberger became the first quarterback in Steelers history to throw for 500 yards in a game.
Snafu in the Superdome	January 24, 2010	Minnesota Vikings	28–31	New Orleans Saints	In the 2009 NFC Championship Game, the Vikings, despite dominating the Saints in many offensive categories, turned the ball over five times, one of which was a costly interception that sent the game to overtime, where the Saints would win to advance to the Super Bowl.
Monday Night Massacre (2010)	November 15, 2010	Philadelphia Eagles	59–28	Washington Redskins	In Donovan McNabb's second game against the Eagles after his departure in 2010, the Eagles dominated, scoring a 88-yard touchdown on their very first offensive play of the game and leading 45–14 at halftime. Eagles quarterback Michael Vick would score six touchdowns (four passing, two rushing), for one of the best statistical performances of his career.
Miracle at the New Meadowlands	December 19, 2010	Philadelphia Eagles	38–31	New York Giants	Comeback victory for the Eagles after being down by 21 points with eight minutes left in the 4th quarter, scoring four unanswered touchdowns and DeSean Jackson winning on a punt return as time expired for the first time in NFL history.
Tsunami Bowl	September 25, 2011	Jacksonville Jaguars	10–16	Carolina Panthers	During a game between the Jaguars and Panthers, a massive downpour turned the field into a muddy mess, causing players to keep slipping and falling. In less than an hour, over four inches of rainwater flooded both the field and the grandstands. The Panthers would ultimately win 16–10.
Matt Flynn Game	January 1, 2012	Detroit Lions	41–45	Green Bay Packers	In the final week of the 2011 NFL season, Packers backup quarterback Matt Flynn threw for over 400 yards and 6 touchdown passes, which was a Packers franchise record. Flynn's performance is regarded as one of the greatest games by a backup quarterback in NFL history.
3:16 game	January 8, 2012	Pittsburgh Steelers	23–29	Denver Broncos	2011 AFC Wild Card Playoff Game:At the end of the game, five stats that contained three digits in the order of 3-1-6 which reference to the John 3:16 Bible verse.
Letterman Jacket Game	December 10, 2012	Houston Texans	14–42	New England Patriots	Before a Monday Night Football game against the New England Patriots, the Houston Texans wore custom-made letterman jackets. The Patriots would then blow out the Texans 42–14.
Blizzard Bowl	December 8, 2013	Detroit Lions	20–34	Philadelphia Eagles	Less than two hours before kickoff, heavy lake-effect snow started pouring down on the field, going up to 8.6 inches during the game. Eagles running back LeSean McCoy dominated, rushing for 217 yards, a then-franchise record for rushing yards in a game, to lead the Eagles to victory.
Comeback in a Flash	December 8, 2013	Cleveland Browns	26–27	New England Patriots	Trailing 26–14 against the Browns in the final minute and a half, the Patriots scored a touchdown, converted an onside kick, and scored another touchdown to take the lead. The Browns then missed a field goal on the final drive of the game, giving the Patriots the win.
Andrew Luck's Masterpiece	January 4, 2014	Kansas City Chiefs	44–45	Indianapolis Colts	Down 38–10 against the Chiefs in the Wild Card Round of the 2013–14 NFL playoffs, Colts quarterback Andrew Luck mounted an incredible comeback, scoring five touchdowns to win the game. It was the second-largest comeback in playoff history and the largest comeback in the history of the Colts franchise.
Dez Caught It	January 11, 2015	Dallas Cowboys	21–26	Green Bay Packers	Down by 5, Cowboys receiver Dez Bryant made a catch on fourth down at the Packers' 1-yard line that would've set the Cowboys in perfect position to win the game. However, the referees declared that Bryant had not maintained possession of the ball, and the call was overturned, essentially ending the game.
"You like that?!"	October 25, 2015	Tampa Bay Buccaneers	30–31	Washington Redskins	Down by 24 points, Redskins quarterback Kirk Cousins led the team to the largest comeback win in franchise history, winning 31–30. After the game, Cousins was seen on camera saying "You like that?!" at reporters.
Superdome Duel	November 1, 2015	New York Giants	49–52	New Orleans Saints	A historic duel between the New York Giants and New Orleans Saints, in which both Eli Manning and Drew Brees combined for 13 touchdown passes.
Odell & Norman Brawl Game	December 20, 2015	Carolina Panthers	38–35	New York Giants	In a 2015 game between the Carolina Panthers and New York Giants, Odell Beckham Jr. and Josh Norman would fight for nearly the entire game, and both players would combine for 5 personal foul penalties, with Beckham Jr. having 3 of them.
The Frostbite Fight	January 10, 2016	Seattle Seahawks	10–9	Minnesota Vikings	A game that ultimately became the third coldest game in NFL history at −6°F (−21°C) at kickoff time. It was so cold that Seahawks safety Kam Chancellor stated that his fingers nearly got amputated after the game due to the sweat on his fingers that froze. Vikings kicker Blair Walsh missed a 27-yard field goal in the closing seconds, giving the Seahawks the victory.
Hail Larry	January 16, 2016	Green Bay Packers	20–26	Arizona Cardinals	After the Packers converted a Hail Mary pass to send the game to overtime, Cardinals wide receiver Larry Fitzgerald had a 75-yard catch-and-run to put the Cardinals at the Packers' 5-yard line, and two plays later, Fitzgerald caught the game-winning touchdown to send the Cardinals to the NFC Championship Game.
28–3	February 5, 2017	New England Patriots	34–28	Atlanta Falcons	Super Bowl LI. Down 28–3 midway through the third quarter, the Patriots won the first Super Bowl to go to overtime, overcoming an estimated 99.8% chance of a Falcons victory in the third quarter. Regarded by many media outlets as the best Super Bowl of all time.
Snow Bowl (2017)	December 10, 2017	Indianapolis Colts	7–13	Buffalo Bills	Game held in the midst of a heavy lake-effect snow storm that ultimately dumped 16.7 inches (42 cm) of snow in Orchard Park, with 8 to 9 inches (20 to 23 cm) falling during the game alone. Alternate name due to the fact it went into overtime.
"Jesse James caught that ball!"	December 17, 2017	New England Patriots	27–24	Pittsburgh Steelers	Trailing by three late in a week 15 game against the Patriots, the Steelers had a 1st-and-Goal from the New England 10-yard line. Steelers QB Ben Roethlisberger threw a short pass to tight end Jesse James, who dove, grabbed the ball, and reached over the goal line for a go-ahead touchdown. However, upon further review, the referees declared that James had not survived the ground, declaring it an incomplete pass. Roethlisberger was picked off two plays later, costing the Steelers the game.
Index Card Game	December 17, 2017	Dallas Cowboys	20–17	Oakland Raiders	In order to determine a close first down late in the game, after the initial measurement, referee Gene Steratore controversially placed an index card between the ball and the yardage chains, giving the Cowboys a first down and eventually the win.
The Return	October 3, 2021	Tampa Bay Buccaneers	19–17	New England Patriots	Tom Brady's first game at the New England Patriots' Gillette Stadium after leaving the team and signing with the Tampa Bay Buccaneers.
Take the Tie	January 9, 2022	Los Angeles Chargers	32–35	Las Vegas Raiders	In week 18 of the 2021 season, the Los Angeles Chargers and Las Vegas Raiders played in a game where, if it ended in a tie, both teams would make it to the playoffs. The Raiders had a 29–14 lead late in the fourth quarter, but the Chargers came back to tie the game and force overtime. After both teams traded field goals, the Raiders thought of taking the tie, but the Chargers called a timeout, causing the Raiders to change their minds and kick a field goal instead, sending the Raiders to the playoffs and eliminating the Chargers.
13 Seconds	January 23, 2022	Buffalo Bills	36–42	Kansas City Chiefs	The 2021 AFC Divisional playoff game featured both the Bills' quarterback Josh Allen and the Chiefs' quarterback Patrick Mahomes throwing for 300 yards, three touchdowns, no interceptions, and rushing for at least 50 yards, culminating in a Mahomes 44-yard drive with 13 seconds left to bring the game to overtime for the Chiefs to win ultimately. The game also resulted in changes to overtime rules to allow both teams to possess the ball.
Minneapolis Miracle II	December 17, 2022	Indianapolis Colts	36–39	Minnesota Vikings	The largest comeback in NFL history, with the Minnesota Vikings overcoming a 33–0 halftime deficit.
8 Seconds	October 11, 2026	Philadelphia Eagles	17–19	Jacksonville Jaguars	After kicking a field goal with 8 seconds remaining in the game, the Eagles kicked the ball to the Jaguars' return man, Ameer Abdullah, who returned the ball all the way to the Eagles' 39-yard line. The return set up kicker Cam Little for a 57-yard kick, which he converted to win the game for the Jaguars.

== Named plays or play series ==
Name	Date	Away team	Score	Home team	Notes
The Hit	November 20, 1960	Philadelphia Eagles	17–10	New York Giants	The Eagles' Chuck Bednarik tackled the Giants' Frank Gifford, knocking him unconscious and giving him a deep concussion that required hospitalization. Considered to be among the most vicious tackles in professional football history.
The Wrong Way Run	October 25, 1964	Minnesota Vikings	27–22	San Francisco 49ers	Minnesota Vikings defensive end Jim Marshall accidentally ran the wrong way into his own end zone after retrieving an offensive fumble, causing a safety.
65 Toss Power Trap	January 11, 1970	Minnesota Vikings	7–23	Kansas City Chiefs	Super Bowl IV. Misdirection play called by Chiefs coach Hank Stram on third and goal on the 5-yard line, leading to a touchdown. Remembered as the decisive moment of the Chiefs' upset victory, as well as for the on-field recordings of Stram by NFL Films in the first NFL game featuring a head coach wearing a microphone.
The Immaculate Reception	December 23, 1972	Oakland Raiders	7–13	Pittsburgh Steelers	In a 1972 AFC divisional playoff game, a Steelers pass bounced off of a Raider's helmet before being caught by Steelers fullback Franco Harris for a game-winning touchdown.
Garo's Gaffe	January 14, 1973	Miami Dolphins	14–7	Washington Redskins	In the final minutes of Super Bowl VII, Dolphins kicker Garo Yepremian's field goal attempt was blocked, and instead of falling on the loose ball, he picked it up and attempted a forward pass. The ball was batted into the air, where Redskins cornerback Mike Bass caught it and returned it 49 yards for a touchdown.
The Sea of Hands	December 21, 1974	Miami Dolphins	26–28	Oakland Raiders	In a 1974–75 NFL playoff game, Oakland quarterback Ken Stabler launched a touchdown pass to running back Clarence Davis, who wrestled the ball away from Miami defenders to secure victory for the Raiders and end Miami's historic run of Super Bowl appearances.
Hail Mary	December 28, 1975	Dallas Cowboys	17–14	Minnesota Vikings	In an NFL playoff game, Cowboys quarterback Roger Staubach threw a long last-ditch game-winning touchdown pass to wide receiver Drew Pearson. He later called it a Hail Mary pass, inventing the term.
Ghost to the Post	December 24, 1977	Oakland Raiders	37–31	Baltimore Colts	A 42-yard pass from Raiders QB Ken Stabler to Dave Casper, nicknamed "The Ghost", set up a game-tying field goal in the final seconds of regulation in the double-overtime 1977-1978 AFC divisional playoff game.
Holy Roller	September 10, 1978	Oakland Raiders	21–20	San Diego Chargers	Controversial game-winning play in which Raiders quarterback Ken Stabler fumbled the ball forward, followed by several other Raiders players pushing the ball towards the end zone for a touchdown that was ruled a forward fumble instead of a forward pass.
Miracle at the Meadowlands	November 19, 1978	Philadelphia Eagles	19–17	New York Giants	Needing only to run out the final seconds to win, the Giants botched a handoff, causing a fumble that Eagles defensive back Herm Edwards recovered for a touchdown. Led to the universal adoption of the quarterback kneel to end games and the firing of Giants offensive coordinator Bob Gibson.
Miracle at the Met	December 20, 1980	Cleveland Browns	23–28	Minnesota Vikings	Down 23–9 in the fourth quarter, the Minnesota Vikings came back with two touchdowns in the final two minutes to wide receiver Ahmad Rashad, including a 46-yard Hail Mary pass caught with one hand on the last play of the game.
Red Right 88	January 4, 1981	Oakland Raiders	14–12	Cleveland Browns	In a 1980–81 NFL playoff game, the Browns passed up a field-goal attempt to run their "Red Slot Right, Halfback Stay, 88," pass play. Raiders safety Mike Davis intercepted the pass, ending the Browns' season.
The Catch	January 10, 1982	Dallas Cowboys	27–28	San Francisco 49ers	During the 1981 NFC Championship Game, Dwight Clark made a leaping grab in the back of the end zone to complete a 6-yard touchdown pass from quarterback Joe Montana, enabling the 49ers to defeat the Cowboys and go on to win Super Bowl XVI.
The Drive	January 11, 1987	Denver Broncos	23–20	Cleveland Browns	Broncos quarterback John Elway led a 98-yard, 5-minute-2-second drive in the 4th quarter of the 1986 AFC Championship Game to tie the game and allow a game-winning field goal in overtime.
The Fumble	January 17, 1988	Cleveland Browns	33–38	Denver Broncos	The 1987 AFC Championship Game, a rematch of The Drive game, saw the Browns fumble away a chance to pull ahead in the 4th quarter.
Wide Right	January 27, 1991	Buffalo Bills	19–20	New York Giants	Bills kicker Scott Norwood missed a 47-yard, would-be game-winning field goal, allowing the New York Giants to win Super Bowl XXV.
Leon Lett Thanksgiving Blunder	November 25, 1993	Miami Dolphins	16–14	Dallas Cowboys	During an NFL Thanksgiving game, Cowboys tackle Leon Lett slips on sleet and accidentally touches a partially-blocked field goal, awarding the ball back to the Dolphins on the 1-yard line, allowing them to kick another field goal and win. It was Lett's second blunder of the calendar year, following his premature celebration in Super Bowl XXVII.
Clock Play	November 27, 1994	Miami Dolphins	28–24	New York Jets	Dolphins quarterback Dan Marino ran a trick play, pretending to stop the game clock but instead threw a pass that scored the game-winning touchdown, ultimately giving Miami the 28–24 victory.
The Immaculate Deflection	January 14, 1996	Indianapolis Colts	16–20	Pittsburgh Steelers	In the 1995 AFC Championship Game, Colts quarterback Jim Harbaugh threw a Hail Mary pass that was deflected by multiple players in the end zone and was almost caught by receiver Aaron Bailey before being ruled incomplete, enabling the Steelers to advance to Super Bowl XXX.
The Helicopter	January 25, 1998	Green Bay Packers	24–31	Denver Broncos	In Super Bowl XXXII, Broncos quarterback John Elway was hit so hard by three Packers defenders that he spun sideways in mid-air, yet recovered to dive for a first down. This play led to a Broncos lead and eventually their first world championship.
The Phantom Touchdown	December 8, 1998	Seattle Seahawks	31–32	New York Jets	In Week 14 of the 1998 season, the Seahawks were clinging to a late lead against the Jets. The Jets were at the Seahawks' 5-yard line, and Jets quarterback Vinny Testaverde tried to sneak into the end zone. Replays of the play showed that Testaverde's helmet had crossed the goal line, but the ball did not. Despite this, however, the referees ruled it a touchdown, giving the Jets the win.
The Catch II	January 3, 1999	Green Bay Packers	27–30	San Francisco 49ers	Wild Card Playoff game which saw a 49ers game-winning pass to Terrell Owens with 8 seconds left in regulation.
Music City Miracle	January 8, 2000	Buffalo Bills	16–22	Tennessee Titans	In a 1999–2000 playoff game, Titans tight end Frank Wycheck threw a lateral pass across the field to Kevin Dyson, who ran 75 yards to score the game-winning touchdown.
The Tackle	January 30, 2000	St. Louis Rams	23–16	Tennessee Titans	On the final play of Super Bowl XXXIV, Rams linebacker Mike Jones tackled Titans wide receiver Kevin Dyson on the one-yard line, preventing a game-tying touchdown.
"HE DID WHAT!?"	November 6, 2000	Minnesota Vikings	20–26	Green Bay Packers	During the overtime of a Monday night game, Antonio Freeman caught what initially appeared to be an incomplete pass while lying on his side—after almost being intercepted by Minnesota Vikings cornerback Cris Dishman, the ball actually bounced off multiple parts of Freeman's body without hitting the ground. Untouched by the defender, Freeman jumped to his feet and ran the ball in for the winning touchdown. The touchdown prompted ABC play-by-play announcer Al Michaels, who was stunned by the play, to shout, "He did WHAT?!"
The Hit That Changed History	September 23, 2001	New York Jets	10–3	New England Patriots	Tackle by Jets linebacker Mo Lewis on Patriots quarterback Drew Bledsoe that left him severely injured which led to rookie Tom Brady relieving him for the rest of the game. Cited as the genesis of Brady's future dominance in the NFL over the next 21 years.
The Helmet Toss	September 8, 2002	Kansas City Chiefs	40–39	Cleveland Browns	With the Browns leading the Chiefs 39–37, the Browns needed one defensive stop to seal the win. After Chiefs quarterback Trent Green took the snap, he was under pressure from Browns linebacker Dwayne Rudd, who barely missed a sack as Green managed to lateral the ball to lineman John Tait. While the play was going on, Rudd took his helmet off and threw it to the ground, believing he had sacked Green, which led to the referees calling a penalty and giving the Chiefs an untimed down, which led to a game-losing field goal for the Browns.
River City Relay	December 21, 2003	New Orleans Saints	19–20	Jacksonville Jaguars	The Saints used three laterals to score a touchdown as time expired in regulation. New Orleans kicker John Carney missed the extra point that would have sent the game into overtime, giving Jacksonville the 20–19 victory.
4th and 26	January 11, 2004	Green Bay Packers	17–20	Philadelphia Eagles	2003–04 playoff overtime victory for the Eagles, whose quarterback Donovan McNabb completed a 28-yard pass on 4th-down-and-26-yards-to-go to wide receiver Freddie Mitchell in the 4th quarter.
"A disgusting act by Randy Moss!"	January 9, 2005	Minnesota Vikings	31–17	Green Bay Packers	2004 NFC Wild Card game; after his second touchdown catch, Vikings wide receiver Randy Moss pretended to moon the crowd at Lambeau Field in celebration, prompting Fox play-by-play announcer Joe Buck to say "that is a disgusting act by Randy Moss", who was visibly upset that the celebration was "on our air live". The NFL fined Moss $10,000 for his actions a few days later.
The Immaculate Redemption	January 15, 2006	Pittsburgh Steelers	21–18	Indianapolis Colts	In a 2005 AFC Divisional playoff game, a late-game fumble by Steelers running back Jerome Bettis was recovered by Colts player Nick Harper, who was stopped near midfield by QB Ben Roethlisberger in a shoestring tackle that likely prevented a game-winning touchdown for the Colts.
Miracle in Miami (2007)	December 16, 2007	Baltimore Ravens	16–22	Miami Dolphins	In week 15 of the 2007 NFL season, the Miami Dolphins were still searching for their first win of the season. Against the Ravens, the two teams were in overtime tied at 16 a piece. After the Ravens missed a field goal, quarterback Cleo Lemon completed a pass to Greg Camarillo, who took the ball 64 yards for a walk-off touchdown, giving the Dolphins their first win of the year, and narrowly avoiding a 0–16 season.
The Helmet Catch	February 3, 2008	New York Giants	17–14	New England Patriots	In the final two minutes of Super Bowl XLII, Giants QB Eli Manning escaped from three New England Patriots defensive players and threw the ball to David Tyree, who leapt and pressed it against his helmet. A subsequent touchdown cemented an upset victory over the Patriots, who were on the verge of becoming the first National Football League (NFL) team to finish a season undefeated and untied since the 1972 Miami Dolphins.
The Orlovsky	October 12, 2008	Detroit Lions	10–12	Minnesota Vikings	Lions quarterback Dan Orlovsky, making his first NFL start, accidentally ran out of the back of the end zone, helping to lose the game amid the Lions' eventual 0–16 season. Similar blunders by later quarterbacks, including Jimmy Garoppolo and Gardner Minshew, have been called "pulling a Dan Orlovsky".
The Immaculate Interception	February 1, 2009	Pittsburgh Steelers	27–23	Arizona Cardinals	Super Bowl XLIII; On the final play of the first half, Kurt Warner and the Arizona Cardinals were driving near the end zone, facing a 10–7 deficit. On 1st-and-Goal, Warner threw the ball, and the pass was intercepted by linebacker James Harrison at the goal line, who returned it 100 yards for a touchdown, the longest play in Super Bowl history at the time.
The Tampa Toe Tap	February 1, 2009	Pittsburgh Steelers	27–23	Arizona Cardinals	In the closing minutes of Super Bowl XLIII, the Cardinals had come back from a 20–7 deficit to take a 23–20 lead. However, the Pittsburgh Steelers engineered a last-minute drive and were down at the Arizona 7-yard line with under a minute to play. On 2nd-and-Goal, Ben Roethlisberger fired a pass into the back of the endzone, which was caught by wide receiver Santonio Holmes, keeping both toes in bounds for the game-winning score.
Minneapolis Miracle (2009)	September 27, 2009	San Francisco 49ers	24–27	Minnesota Vikings	With less than 10 seconds remaining in a 2009 game against the San Francisco 49ers, Vikings quarterback Brett Favre heaved a 32-yard pass intended for wide receiver Greg Lewis, who made a toe-tapping catch in the back of the endzone for the victory.
4th and 2	November 15, 2009	New England Patriots	34–35	Indianapolis Colts	In another chapter in the Colts–Patriots rivalry, the Patriots found themselves up by six points, yet deep in their own territory and facing a 4th down and 2 from the 28-yard line. Instead of punting the football, they chose to keep their offense on the field to try to get the first down. The Patriots were stopped short, which gave the Colts excellent field position. They scored a touchdown to take the lead and held off New England on the next drive for the victory.
Ambush	February 7, 2010	New Orleans Saints	31–17	Indianapolis Colts	In the first minutes of the second half of Super Bowl XLIV, the New Orleans Saints executed an onside kick. This was the first onside kick attempted before the fourth quarter in Super Bowl history, a play the Saints referred to as "The Ambush."
Beast Quake	January 8, 2011	New Orleans Saints	36–41	Seattle Seahawks	Seattle Seahawks running back Marshawn "Beast Mode" Lynch broke nine tackles on a 67-yard touchdown run. The subsequent celebration of Seahawks fans registered on a nearby seismograph.
The Catch III	January 14, 2012	New Orleans Saints	32–36	San Francisco 49ers	Last-second, game-winning touchdown pass caught by Vernon Davis.
Fail Mary	September 24, 2012	Green Bay Packers	12–14	Seattle Seahawks	The Seahawks won on a Hail Mary pass for a touchdown despite an offensive pass interference penalty and a simultaneous possession catch.
Butt Fumble	November 22, 2012	New England Patriots	49–19	New York Jets	Jets quarterback Mark Sanchez collided with the buttocks of his teammate, offensive lineman Brandon Moore, causing a fumble that was recovered by the Patriots' safety Steve Gregory and returned for a touchdown.
Mile High Miracle	January 12, 2013	Baltimore Ravens	38–35	Denver Broncos	In the final minutes of a 2012 Divisional Round game against the Denver Broncos, Baltimore Ravens quarterback Joe Flacco threw a game-tying 70-yard touchdown pass to receiver Jacoby Jones with under a minute left in regulation.
The Pick at the Stick	December 23, 2013	Atlanta Falcons	24–34	San Francisco 49ers	The 49ers clinched a playoff spot when NaVorro Bowman intercepted Falcons quarterback Matt Ryan and returned the interception for an 89-yard touchdown. This was the last 49ers home game played at Candlestick Park.
4th and 8	December 29, 2013	Green Bay Packers	33–28	Chicago Bears	With 43 seconds left in a Week 17 game in 2013 between the Green Bay Packers and Chicago Bears, Packers quarterback Aaron Rodgers found a wide-open Randall Cobb for a go-ahead touchdown to give the Packers a 33–28 win, which sent the Packers to the postseason and eliminated the Bears.
The Tip	January 19, 2014	San Francisco 49ers	17–23	Seattle Seahawks	With 30 seconds left in the 2013 NFC Championship Game, 49ers quarterback Colin Kaepernick threw a pass to Michael Crabtree that was deflected in the right corner of the end zone by cornerback Richard Sherman into linebacker Malcolm Smith's hands for an interception, sealing the Seahawks victory and allowing them their first Super Bowl win at Super Bowl XLVIII.
Emerald City Miracle	January 18, 2015	Green Bay Packers	22–28	Seattle Seahawks	In the 2014 NFC Championship Game against the Green Bay Packers, the Seattle Seahawks would fall behind 19–7 with 5 minutes left in the game, but would perform a miraculous comeback, scoring 15 points within 44 seconds of game time, and would score the winning touchdown in overtime, sending them to the Super Bowl for the second straight season.
Colts Catastrophe	October 18, 2015	New England Patriots	34–27	Indianapolis Colts	An unsuccessful Colts fake punt trick play in which upback Colt Anderson was to receive the ball from gunner Griff Whalen with no protection, resulting in an immediate tackle for a loss after the ball was snapped and an illegal formation penalty on the Colts. New England took over on downs. Broadly regarded as one of the worst plays in NFL history.
Kick Six	November 30, 2015	Baltimore Ravens	33–27	Cleveland Browns	With the game tied at 27, Browns kicker Travis Coons lined up for a 51-yard game-winning field goal. However, the kick was blocked by Ravens defensive end Brent Urban, and the ball was picked up by Ravens safety Will Hill, who returned it for a 64-yard game-winning touchdown.
Miracle in Motown	December 3, 2015	Green Bay Packers	27–23	Detroit Lions	Packers quarterback Aaron Rodgers threw a 61-yard (56 m) Hail Mary pass into the end zone that was caught by tight end Richard Rodgers for the game-winning touchdown after trailing 20–0 in the second half.
The Immaculate Extension	December 25, 2016	Baltimore Ravens	27–31	Pittsburgh Steelers	Catch by Steelers wide receiver Antonio Brown at the Baltimore 1-yard line, which he extended over the goal line despite being tackled by two Baltimore defenders to take the lead and win the game.
Minneapolis Miracle	January 14, 2018	New Orleans Saints	24–29	Minnesota Vikings	2017–18 playoff game play where on the last play of the game, Vikings quarterback Case Keenum threw a pass to wide receiver Stefon Diggs; Saints safety Marcus Williams missed a tackle, allowing Diggs to run to the end zone to complete the 61-yard touchdown pass. The game became the first in NFL playoff history to end in a touchdown as time expired.
Philly Special	February 4, 2018	Philadelphia Eagles	41–33	New England Patriots	Super Bowl LII trick play with the ball snapped by Eagles center Jason Kelce to running back Corey Clement, flipped to Trey Burton, and thrown to Eagles QB Nick Foles who ran for a touchdown, helping the Eagles win their first championship in 57 years. Nick Foles became the first player in Super Bowl history to both throw and catch a touchdown pass during a Super Bowl game. This is actually what the play is called in the Eagles’ playbook.
Miracle in Miami	December 9, 2018	New England Patriots	33–34	Miami Dolphins	The first walk-off game-winning touchdown in NFL history to involve multiple lateral passes.
Double Doink	January 6, 2019	Philadelphia Eagles	16–15	Chicago Bears	2018 NFC Wild Card game-ending field goal attempt by Bears kicker Cody Parkey that was partially deflected by Eagles defensive lineman Treyvon Hester before the ball hit the left upright and then bounced off the crossbar away from the scoring goal, resulting in a Bears loss.
NOLA No-Call	January 20, 2019	Los Angeles Rams	26–23	New Orleans Saints	Missed pass interference call on the Rams during the 2018 NFC Championship Game, resulted in backlash against NFL officiating.
Jet Chip Wasp	February 2, 2020	San Francisco 49ers	20–31	Kansas City Chiefs	Super Bowl LIV. Chiefs quarterback Patrick Mahomes' largest 2019 season air-distance completion at 57.1 yards in the air to wide receiver Tyreek Hill.
Hail Murray	November 15, 2020	Buffalo Bills	30–32	Arizona Cardinals	Cardinals quarterback Kyler Murray threw a 43-yard Hail Mary pass into the end zone that wide receiver DeAndre Hopkins caught over three Bills defenders for the game-winning touchdown.
Butt Punt	September 25, 2022	Buffalo Bills	19–21	Miami Dolphins	Dolphins punter Thomas Morstead kicked the ball into the backside of Dolphins blocker Trent Sherfield, causing the ball to bounce out of the end zone for a safety.
Lunatic Lateral	December 18, 2022	New England Patriots	24–30	Las Vegas Raiders	Game-losing double lateral thrown to Raiders defender Chandler Jones for a walk-off touchdown.
The Fumble in the Jungle	January 15, 2023	Baltimore Ravens	17–24	Cincinnati Bengals	Baltimore Ravens quarterback Tyler Huntley fumbled at the goal line, which was recovered by Bengals defensive end Sam Hubbard and returned for a 98-yard touchdown, the longest fumble return in NFL postseason history.
Corn Dog	February 12, 2023	Kansas City Chiefs	38–35	Philadelphia Eagles	Super Bowl LVII: A misdirection offensive play that the Chiefs used to score two touchdowns in Super Bowl LVII to defeat the Philadelphia Eagles.
Hell Mary	November 24, 2023	Miami Dolphins	34–13	New York Jets	A failed Hail Mary pass by Jets quarterback Tim Boyle that led to a 99-yard pick-six by Dolphins safety Jevon Holland.
Wide Right II	January 21, 2024	Kansas City Chiefs	27–24	Buffalo Bills	Bills kicker Tyler Bass missed a game-tying 44-yard field goal wide right, losing the game for Buffalo and sending the Kansas City Chiefs to the AFC Championship Game.
Tom and Jerry	February 11, 2024	San Francisco 49ers	22–25	Kansas City Chiefs	Super Bowl LVIII; On the last play of the game, quarterback Patrick Mahomes threw a game-winning touchdown to wide receiver Mecole Hardman, securing the Chiefs' second consecutive Super Bowl victory and third in five seasons.
Hail Maryland	October 27, 2024	Chicago Bears	15–18	Washington Commanders	Commanders rookie quarterback Jayden Daniels threw a Hail Mary pass as time expired that was tipped at the goal line by Bears cornerback Tyrique Stevenson to Commanders wide receiver Noah Brown to win the game 18-15.
The Dagger	February 9, 2025	Kansas City Chiefs	22–40	Philadelphia Eagles	Super Bowl LIX. Eagles quarterback Jalen Hurts threw a 46-yard touchdown pass to DeVonta Smith to make the score 34-0 late in the third quarter. The broadcast crew (Kevin Burkhardt and Tom Brady) dubbed the play "The Dagger", as the Eagles chose to score quickly rather than run down the clock to protect their lead.
Zachwards Pass	December 18, 2025	Los Angeles Rams	37–38	Seattle Seahawks	A two-point conversion play that was initially ruled no good was overturned after a backwards pass was fumbled and recovered by Seahawks running back Zach Charbonnet in the end zone, tying the game in regulation and eventually forcing overtime, where the Seahawks would win.
Wide Right (Baltimore Ravens)	January 4, 2026	Baltimore Ravens	24–26	Pittsburgh Steelers	In the final week of the 2025 NFL season, the Baltimore Ravens and Pittsburgh Steelers would face off to decide the AFC North title. Down by two, Ravens kicker Tyler Loop lined up for a 44-yard game-winning field goal. However, Loop's kick sailed wide right, costing the Ravens the division and a playoff berth.
Trio in Rio	September 27, 2026	Baltimore Ravens	34–31	Dallas Cowboys	In the first ever NFL game in Rio de Janeiro, Brazil, the Baltimore Ravens received the ball in a 31–31 tie game with seven seconds remaining in regulation at their own 35-yard line following a touchback. Ravens quarterback Lamar Jackson completed a 27-yard pass over the middle to receiver Zay Flowers. As Flowers was tackled, Jackson called the Ravens' last remaining timeout with one second left to set up kicker Tyler Loop's 56-yard field goal attempt. Loop made the kick, redeeming from his miss at Pittsburgh last year that ended the Ravens' season. CBS play-by-play announcer Jim Nantz nicknamed Loop's game-winning field goal "a trio in Rio".

== See also ==
- List of NFL nicknames
- NFL controversies
- List of nicknamed college football games and plays
- List of nicknamed MLB games and plays
