= Snowball Game =

Snowball Game may refer to:

- Snowball Game (1985), a contest held during the 1985 NFL season
- Snowball Game (1995), a contest held during the 1995 NFL season
