= 2022 Indianapolis Colts–Minnesota Vikings game =

American football game

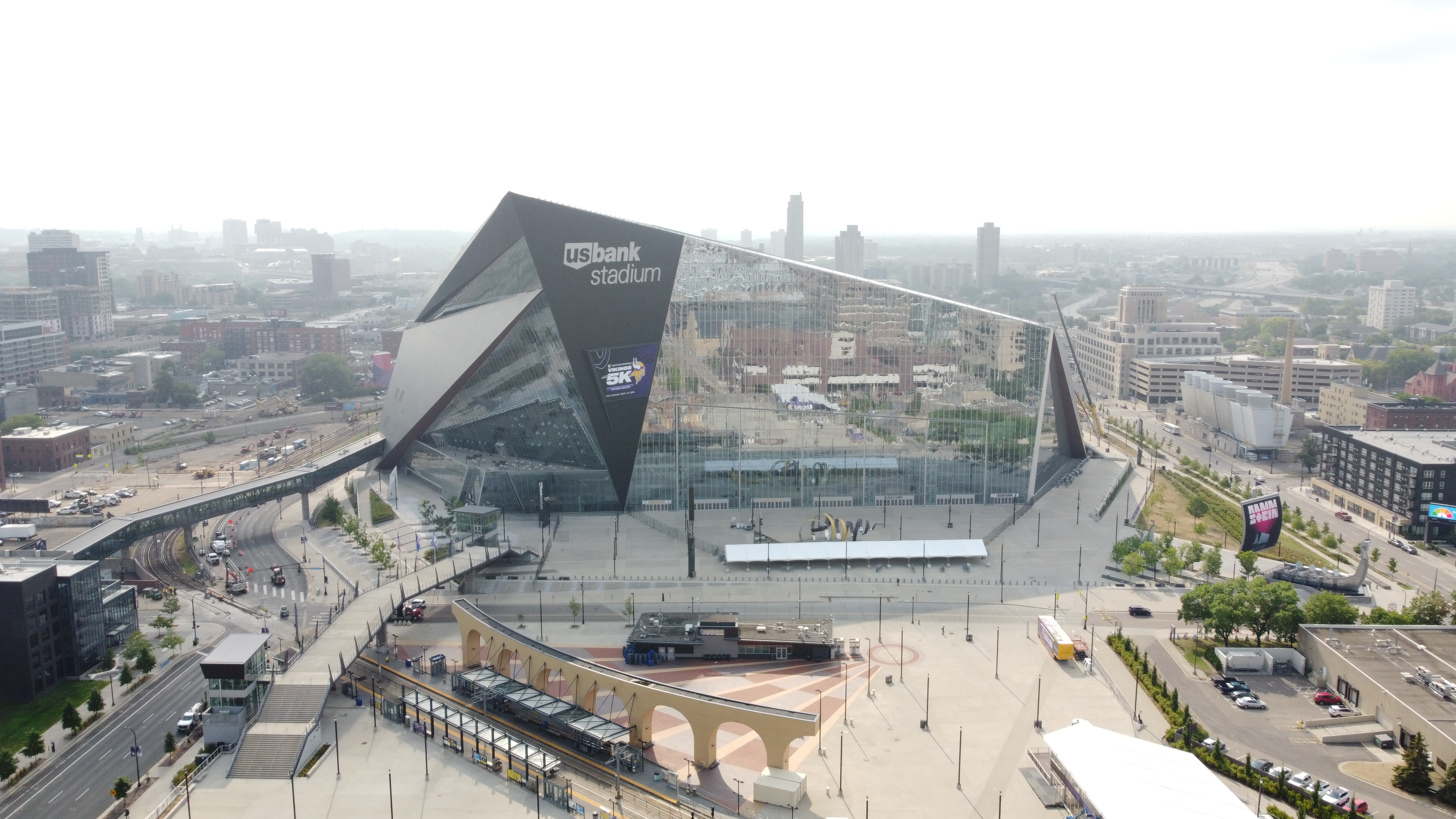
- The game was played at U.S. Bank Stadium in Minneapolis.
Indianapolis Colts (4–8–1)	Minnesota Vikings (10–3)
36	39
Head coach: Jeff Saturday (interim)	Head coach: Kevin O'Connell
	1	2	3	4	OT	Total
IND	17	16	3	0	0	36
MIN	0	0	14	22	3	39
- Date: December 17, 2022
- Stadium: U.S. Bank Stadium; Minneapolis, Minnesota
- Favorite: Vikings by 3.5
- Referee: Tra Blake
- Attendance: 66,801

TV in the United States
- Network: NFLN, KSTP-TV (Minneapolis), WRTV (Indianapolis)
- Announcers: Noah Eagle, Nate Burleson, Tom Pelissero and Lindsay Czarniak

In a National Football League (NFL) game on December 17, 2022, at U.S. Bank Stadium in Minneapolis, Minnesota, the Minnesota Vikings overcame a 33–0 halftime deficit to defeat the visiting Indianapolis Colts 39–36 in overtime and complete the largest comeback in NFL history. The matchup, which was part of Week 15 of the 2022 NFL season, was the third game in the NFL or American Football League (AFL) in which a team with a lead of at least 30 points failed to win after the Denver Broncos overcame a 31-point deficit to tie the Buffalo Bills in the 1960 AFL season and the Buffalo Bills overcame a 32-point deficit to defeat the Houston Oilers in a 1992 Wild Card playoff game.

== Background ==
The Colts entered the game in third place in the AFC South with a 4–8–1 record. They remained mathematically in playoff contention, but were considered unlikely to qualify. Having lacked a consistent starting quarterback since Andrew Luck's retirement in 2019, they acquired 14-year veteran Matt Ryan during the offseason. Ryan struggled early on and was benched for Sam Ehlinger in Week 8. When the team did not improve under Ehlinger, head coach Frank Reich was fired after Week 9 and replaced by ESPN analyst and former Colts player Jeff Saturday, who held no prior professional or collegiate coaching experience. Saturday reinstated Ryan and won his first game, but lost his next three.

The Vikings entered the game leading the NFC North with a 10–3 record. By winning or tying against the Colts, they would secure a playoff berth and their first division title since 2017. However, the team's playoff legitimacy was questioned because all but one of their wins were by a one-score margin and their three losses were by multiple scores. As a result, Minnesota was the first NFL team with a 10–3 record to have a negative point differential.

This was the 26th meeting between the two teams; the Colts led the series 18–8–1. They were also on a six-game winning streak against the Vikings, having last lost in 1997.

== Game summary ==
=== First half ===
Despite allowing the Colts to drive down to the 1-yard line on the opening possession, the Vikings were able to push them back to the 8-yard line, forcing a 26-yard field goal from former Viking Chase McLaughlin. On the ensuing drive, the Vikings were forced to punt, but Ryan Wright's kick was blocked by Ifeadi Odenigbo, another former Viking, and returned 24 yards for a touchdown by JoJo Domann. Dalvin Cook took the opening play of the Vikings' next possession 40 yards into Colts territory, but fumbled on the next play, allowing the Colts to capitalize by capping a 66-yard drive for a 17–0 lead with a 1-yard touchdown run from Deon Jackson. On the Vikings' next drive, they were stopped on 3rd-and-1 and attempted to go for it on 4th down, only to be stopped again, giving the Colts the ball in Vikings territory.

As the game entered the second quarter, the Vikings' defense stood firm, forcing the Colts to kick a field goal. The Vikings were faced with another 4th-and-1 and set up to punt, only for Wright to toss the ball in the direction of Jalen Nailor; however, it fell incomplete and the Vikings turned the ball over on downs again, allowing the Colts to kick another field goal, this time from 49 yards. After another Vikings' punt, on a 3rd and 10 play, Matt Ryan threw a pass to Michael Pittman Jr. who was grabbed just past the line of scrimmage by Vikings cornerback Chandon Sullivan. Pittman, trying to fight for yards on 3rd down, was hit by Vikings linebacker Brian Asamoah II while being tackled which caused Pittman to fumble and the ball was picked up by Sullivan and returned for a subsequent touchdown. However, the referees had signaled the play was over before Pittman fumbled, saying that forward progress was stopped; taking away a potential touchdown from the Vikings. The two teams then exchanged punts before Vikings quarterback Kirk Cousins threw an interception deep in his own territory that Julian Blackmon returned 17 yards for a touchdown and a 30–0 lead. The Vikings thought they had managed to ignite their offense on the next possession, but a 40-yard completion to K. J. Osborn was overturned after the Colts challenged the play. The Vikings eventually had to punt, and with four minutes left in the half, the Colts drove the ball downfield and kicked a 27-yard field goal to go into the break with a 33–0 lead.

=== Second half ===
To start the second half, the Vikings lost yardage and were again forced to punt; however, they were able to force the Colts into their second punt of the game on the following drive. A big pass from Cousins to Osborn moved the Vikings 63 yards downfield on their next possession, putting them inside the Colts' 5-yard line; after a short gain by Cook, Cousins found Osborn in the end zone for the Vikings' first points of the game. The defense then made a stop as the Colts entered Vikings territory, limiting them to a 52-yard field goal, before the Vikings offense marched downfield to score another touchdown via a one-yard run from fullback C. J. Ham. They then closed out the third quarter by forcing the Colts into another punt. The score was 36–14.

Minnesota opened the fourth quarter with a 20-yard completion from Cousins to Justin Jefferson, and an unnecessary roughness penalty on Rodney Thomas II added another 15 yards. Another Jefferson reception for 17 yards got the Vikings into the red zone, and the drive was capped by a third Jefferson catch for an eight-yard touchdown, reducing the deficit to 15 points. The Colts punted again on the next possession, and Jalen Reagor returned the kick 51 yards to put the Vikings on the verge of the red zone again, only for the play to be called back for a facemask penalty against Vikings cornerback Kris Boyd. The Vikings made their way downfield, helped by another unnecessary roughness penalty for a hit on Jefferson by Stephon Gilmore, only for Cousins to throw another interception when targeting Reagor on a deep route that the receiver appeared to give up on. The Colts started on their own two-yard line, but could not capitalize on the turnover as the Vikings forced them to punt once again, and Reagor made a fair catch at midfield. Completions to Adam Thielen (his first target of the game) and Osborn, followed by a pass interference penalty in the end zone, got the Vikings down to the Colts 1-yard line, and they scored a touchdown on the third attempt, when Cousins found Thielen in the end zone to bring Minnesota to within 36–28. The Colts managed a first down on their next possession, but on the very next play, Jackson fumbled, and Chandon Sullivan recovered the ball and returned it for what he thought was a touchdown, only for the officials to rule Jackson to have been down by contact; Sullivan's protestations earned him a 15-yard penalty for unsportsmanlike conduct. On review, the play was confirmed as a fumble, giving the Vikings the ball, but because the officials had whistled, they could not award the touchdown. It was the second time in the game a potential defensive touchdown was taken away from Sullivan and the Vikings. Following the penalty, the Vikings started just inside their own half, but despite Jefferson picking up a pair of seven-yard catches, the drive stalled. On 4th-and-15, Cousins attempted to run for the first down, but he was tripped, and the Vikings turned the ball over on downs for a third time with 2:52 left in the quarter. The Colts moved into Vikings territory, but faced with a 4th-and-1 on the Vikings' 36-yard line, where Matt Ryan was stopped short on a quarterback sneak. The Vikings used all three of their timeouts during the Colts' drive, but on the first play of the following possession, Dalvin Cook took a screen pass 64 yards downfield for a touchdown. The Vikings attempted a two-point conversion, and Cousins found T. J. Hockenson in the end zone, tying the game 36–36 with 2:15 left to play. The teams then traded punts, sending the game to overtime.

=== Overtime ===
The Vikings won the toss ahead of the extra period and elected to receive the ball, but their opening drive stalled after Cousins was sacked and an offensive holding penalty was called on guard Ezra Cleveland. A 14-yard catch by Hockenson put the Vikings on the verge of Greg Joseph's field goal range, but they declined the 57-yard attempt and punted instead. The defense then forced the Colts into a punt following a short drive, leaving the Vikings on their own 18-yard line. After a six-yard run by Cook, Cousins completed passes to Osborn, Thielen and Jefferson to get the Vikings down to the Colts' 27-yard line with 20 seconds left to play, and a delay of game penalty against Odenigbo moved them five yards closer to the end zone. That presented Joseph with the opportunity for a 40-yard, game-winning field goal. Despite the Colts using a timeout in an attempt to ice the kicker, Joseph's kick was successful, giving the Vikings a 39–36 victory and completing the biggest comeback in NFL history.

== Box score ==
Week 15: Indianapolis Colts at Minnesota Vikings – Game summary

Quarter	1	2	3	4	OT	Total
Colts	17	16	3	0	0	36
Vikings	0	0	14	22	3	39

at U.S. Bank Stadium, Minneapolis, Minnesota

- Date: December 17
- Game time: 12:00 p.m. CST
- Game weather: None (indoor stadium)
- Game attendance: 66,801
- Referee: Tra Blake (3)
- TV announcers (NFLN): Noah Eagle, Nate Burleson, Tom Pelissero and Lindsay Czarniak
- Recap, Game Book

Game information

First quarter

- IND – Chase McLaughlin 26-yard field goal, 9:11. Colts 3–0. Drive: 11 plays, 44 yards, 5:49.
- IND – JoJo Domann 24-yard return of blocked punt (Chase McLaughlin kick), 8:12. Colts 10–0.
- IND – Deon Jackson 1-yard pass from Matt Ryan (Chase McLaughlin kick), 3:51. Colts 17–0. Drive: 7 plays, 66 yards, 3:29.

Second quarter

- IND – Chase McLaughlin 28-yard field goal, 13:07. Colts 20–0. Drive: 6 plays, 21 yards, 3:03.
- IND – Chase McLaughlin 49-yard field goal, 10:41. Colts 23–0. Drive: 4 plays, 0 yards, 0:20.
- IND – Julian Blackmon 17-yard interception return (Chase McLaughlin kick), 5:50. Colts 30–0.
- IND – Chase McLaughlin 27-yard field goal, 0:08. Colts 33–0. Drive: 9 plays, 65 yards, 3:52.

Third quarter

- MIN – K. J. Osborn 2-yard pass from Kirk Cousins (Greg Joseph kick), 8:22. Colts 33–7. Drive: 7 plays, 88 yards, 2:54.
- IND – Chase McLaughlin 52-yard field goal, 4:53. Colts 36–7. Drive: 6 plays, 26 yards, 3:29.
- MIN – C. J. Ham 1-yard run (Greg Joseph kick), 1:13. Colts 36–14. Drive: 8 plays, 75 yards, 3:40.

Fourth quarter

- MIN – Justin Jefferson 8-yard pass from Kirk Cousins (Greg Joseph kick), 12:53. Colts 36–21. Drive: 6 plays, 61 yards, 2:14.
- MIN – Adam Thielen 1-yard pass from Kirk Cousins (Greg Joseph kick), 5:30. Colts 36–28. Drive: 5 plays, 50 yards, 1:36.
- MIN – Dalvin Cook 64-yard pass from Kirk Cousins (Kirk Cousins–T. J. Hockenson pass), 2:15. Tied 36–36. Drive: 1 play, 64 yards, 0:13.

Overtime

- MIN – Greg Joseph 40-yard field goal, 0:03. Vikings 39–36. Drive: 6 plays, 60 yards, 1:38.

Top passers

- IND – Matt Ryan – 19/33, 182 yards, TD
- MIN – Kirk Cousins – 34/54, 460 yards, 4 TD, 2 INT

Top rushers

- IND – Zack Moss – 24 rushes, 81 yards
- MIN – Dalvin Cook – 17 rushes, 95 yards

Top receivers

- IND – Michael Pittman Jr. – 10 receptions, 60 yards
- MIN – K. J. Osborn – 10 receptions, 157 yards, TD

== Aftermath ==
The Colts were officially eliminated from playoff contention the following Thursday when the Jacksonville Jaguars beat the New York Jets. Nick Foles was named the Colts' starting quarterback in their next two games, who also struggled until he suffered an injury, and Ehlinger started the season finale. The Colts went on to lose all their remaining games, capping off a seven-game losing streak to finish 4–12–1 and third in the AFC South. In the 2023 NFL draft, the Colts selected quarterback Anthony Richardson fourth overall, the first time they drafted a quarterback in the first round since Luck in 2012.

After clinching the NFC North, the Vikings won two of their next three games to finish 13–4 and third in NFC playoff seeding. They had one additional victory by a one-score margin and their final regular season loss was by multiple scores. The Vikings set the NFL season record for one-score victories at 11 and became the first 13-win NFL team to have a negative point differential at −3. In the Wild Card Round, the Vikings were defeated 31–24 by the New York Giants, their only one-score loss of the season.

The game marked Ryan's final appearance in the league. With the loss, he obtained the dubious distinction of being on the losing end of the largest Super Bowl comeback and the largest NFL comeback.

== Officials ==
The game featured seven on-field officials and a replay official based in New York. The numbers in parentheses below indicate their uniform numbers.

- Referee: Tra Blake (3)
- Umpire: Tony Michalek (115)
- Down judge: Patrick Turner (13)
- Line judge: Mark Stewart (75)
- Field judge: Tom Hill (97)
- Side judge: Don Willard (58)
- Back judge: Todd Prukop (30)
- Replay official: Andrew Lambert

== See also ==
- The Comeback (American football)
- Miracle in Motown
- Minneapolis Miracle
- Miracle at the Met
- Miracle at the New Meadowlands
- Monday Night Miracle (American football)
- Super Bowl LI
- List of nicknamed NFL games and plays
