= Joe Reich =

American football coach (born c. 1965)

Current position
- Title: Athletic director
- Team: Wingate
- Conference: SAC

Biographical details
- Born: c. 1965 (age 60–61); Lebanon, Pennsylvania, U.S.
- Education: Gettysburg College (1987)

Playing career
- 1984–1987: Gettysburg
- Position: Offensive lineman

Coaching career (HC unless noted)
- 1988: Georgia Tech (GA)
- 1989–1992: Gettysburg (OL)
- 1993–1994: Buffalo (DL/S&C)
- 1995–1996: Buffalo (DL)
- 1997–2000: Buffalo (DC)
- 2001–2023: Wingate

Administrative career (AD unless noted)
- 2023: Wingate (interim AD)
- 2023–present: Wingate

Head coaching record
- Overall: 158–92
- Tournaments: 4–5 (NCAA D-II playoffs)

Accomplishments and honors

Championships
- 2 SAC (2010, 2017); 1 SAC Piedmont Division (2022)

Joe Reich (born c. 1965) is an American athletic director and former college football coach. He was the head football coach for Wingate University from 2001 to 2023 before becoming athletic director in 2023. Reich also coached for Gettysburg, Georgia Tech, and Buffalo. He played college football for Gettysburg as an offensive lineman.

== Personal life ==
Reich's older brother, Frank, is a former head coach for the Carolina Panthers and Indianapolis Colts of the National Football League (NFL), and also played professionally in the NFL for fourteen seasons.

== Head coaching record ==
Year	Team	Overall	Conference	Standing	Bowl/playoffs	AFCA^{#}
Wingate Bulldogs (South Atlantic Conference) (2001–2023)
2001	Wingate	4–7	1–6	7th		
2002	Wingate	5–6	2–5	6th		
2003	Wingate	5–6	2–5	T–5th		
2004	Wingate	8–3	4–3	T–2nd		
2005	Wingate	5–5	2–5	7th		
2006	Wingate	8–3	5–2	T–2nd		
2007	Wingate	7–4	2–4	5th		
2008	Wingate	8–3	4–3	T–4th		
2009	Wingate	7–3	5–2	2nd		
2010	Wingate	9–3	6–1	1st	L NCAA Division II Second Round	20
2011	Wingate	5–6	4–3	T–3rd		
2012	Wingate	6–5	5–2	T–2nd		
2013	Wingate	4–6	3–4	T–4th		
2014	Wingate	6–5	3–4	T–4th		
2015	Wingate	6–5	3–4	T–5th		
2016	Wingate	8–3	5–2	T–2nd		
2017	Wingate	9–2	6–1	1st	L NCAA Division II First Round	24
2018	Wingate	9–4	5–2	2nd	L NCAA Division II Second Round	24
2019	Wingate	10–2	7–1	2nd	L NCAA Division II First Round	19
2020–21	Wingate	2–2	2–2	3rd (Piedmont)		
2021	Wingate	8–3	6–2	T–2nd		
2022	Wingate	11–3	7–2	T–1st (Piedmont)	L NCAA Division II Quarterfinal	15
2023	Wingate	8–3	6–2	3rd (Piedmont)		
Wingate:		158–92	95–67			
Total:		158–92				
National championship Conference title Conference division title or championship game berth
