= Jim Tunney (American football) =

American football official (1929–2024)

- Born: March 3, 1929; Los Angeles, California, U.S.
- Died: December 12, 2024 (aged 95); Pebble Beach, California, U.S.
- Education: Occidental College
- Occupation: NFL official (1960–1990)

Jim Tunney (March 3, 1929 – December 12, 2024) was an American professional football official in the National Football League (NFL) from 1960 to 1990. In his 31 years as an NFL official, Tunney received a record 29 post-season assignments, including ten championship games and Super Bowls VI, XI and XII and named as an alternate in Super Bowl XVIII. He remains the only referee who worked consecutive Super Bowls.

== Life and career ==
Nicknamed the "Dean of NFL Referees", Tunney was the first official to be named to the "All-Madden Team" in 1990 and won the "Gold Whistle Award" in 1992 from the National Association of Sports Officials (NASO). He wore uniform number 32 for most of his career but when the NFL numbered each position separately from 1979 through 1981 rather than assigning one number per official, he wore number 3. Tunney's trademark signal upon a successful field goal, or extra point, featured raising his arms with fists clenched then opening both fists simultaneously to indicate the attempt as "good".

Officials who worked on Tunney's crew for many years included former NFL great Pat Harder at umpire and head linesman Burl Toler, the NFL's first African-American official.

Tunney graduated from Franklin High School in Los Angeles class of 1947 then after he graduated from nearby Occidental College in 1951, Tunney began officiating football and basketball working high school, college and Pacific Coast Conference (Pac-10) games until 1967. In 1960, he was hired to work in the NFL as a field judge before being promoted to the referee position in 1967 where he would stay for the remainder of his career until retiring after the 1990 NFL season. His final game was the 1990 AFC Championship Game between the Buffalo Bills and Los Angeles Raiders played January 20, 1991. He then worked on the NFL officiating staff as an Observer, attending games each week helping with improvement of the current game officials.

Still active in league affairs and many sports issues, Tunney was a member of Commissioner Tagliabue's Officiating 2000 Committee and was Vice Chair of the U.S. Olympic Committee for Northern California (Sydney 2000 Games). In 1993, he founded the Jim Tunney Youth Foundation, which supports community programs and resources that work with youth to develop leadership, work skills, wellness and self-esteem. He wrote a weekly column for the Monterey Herald and was a motivational speaker.

Tunney was the Boys' Vice Principal at Abraham Lincoln High School in the City of Los Angeles, California. He also served as the Principal of Fairfax High School in Los Angeles from 1964 to 1970.

Tunney died at his home in Pebble Beach, California, on December 12, 2024, at the age of 95.

== Memorable games ==
Here is a listing of some notable games Tunney was involved in:

- "The Field Goal" – Baltimore at Green Bay (December 26, 1965) – field judge
- "The Ice Bowl" – Dallas at Green Bay (December 31, 1967) – alternate referee
- "The Kick" – Detroit at New Orleans (November 8, 1970)
- 1979 AFC championship game – Houston at Pittsburgh (January 6, 1980) (In this game, Oilers wide receiver Mike Renfro was ruled to have been out of bounds on an apparent touchdown pass from Dan Pastorini late in the third quarter that would have tied the game. Replays showed that Renfro got both feet down inbounds, but Houston had to settle for a field goal.)
- "The Catch" – Dallas at San Francisco (January 10, 1982)
- "The 100th Game" – Green Bay at Chicago (November 20, 1983)
- "The Snowball Game" – San Francisco at Denver (November 11, 1985)
- "The Fumble" – Cleveland at Denver (January 17, 1988)
- "The Fog Bowl" – Philadelphia at Chicago (December 31, 1988)

== Educator ==
Off the field, Tunney had a long career as an educator and school administrator, starting out in 1951 as a teacher at Los Angeles' Lincoln High School, later becoming vice principal from 1959 to 1964. He then served as a principal of Los Angeles high schools Fairfax (1964–1970), Franklin (1972–1973), and Hollywood High School (1973–74). He became assistant superintendent of secondary education for the Bellflower Unified School District in 1975 and served as the district's superintendent in 1977. He left education for 16 years before becoming headmaster from 1993 to 1994 of the York School in Monterey, California, joining the school's board of trustees in 1995. He also joined the board of trustees for Monterey Peninsula College in 1997 and served on that board until 2009 (12 years – 6 of which were as board chair. He was awarded MPC's President's Award in 2009 – only the third so named as well as 2009 Public Official of the Year by the Monterey Peninsula Chamber of Commerce. In 2011, he was inducted into the Fairfax High School Hall of Fame (the only administrator so inducted). In 2011, he was also inducted into the California Community Coaches Hall of Fame.

== Books by Tunney ==
- Impartial Judgment: "The Dean of NFL Referees" Calls Pro Football As He Sees It, 1988 (ISBN 0-531-15095-X)
- Chicken Soup for the Sports Fan's Soul, 2000 (ISBN 1-55874-875-X)
- It's The Will, Not The Skill, 2004 (ISBN 1-4134-5832-7)
- "101 Best of Tunney Side of Sports" 2014 (ISBN 978-1-60679-301-5)
