= The Comeback (American football) =

1993 American football game in New York

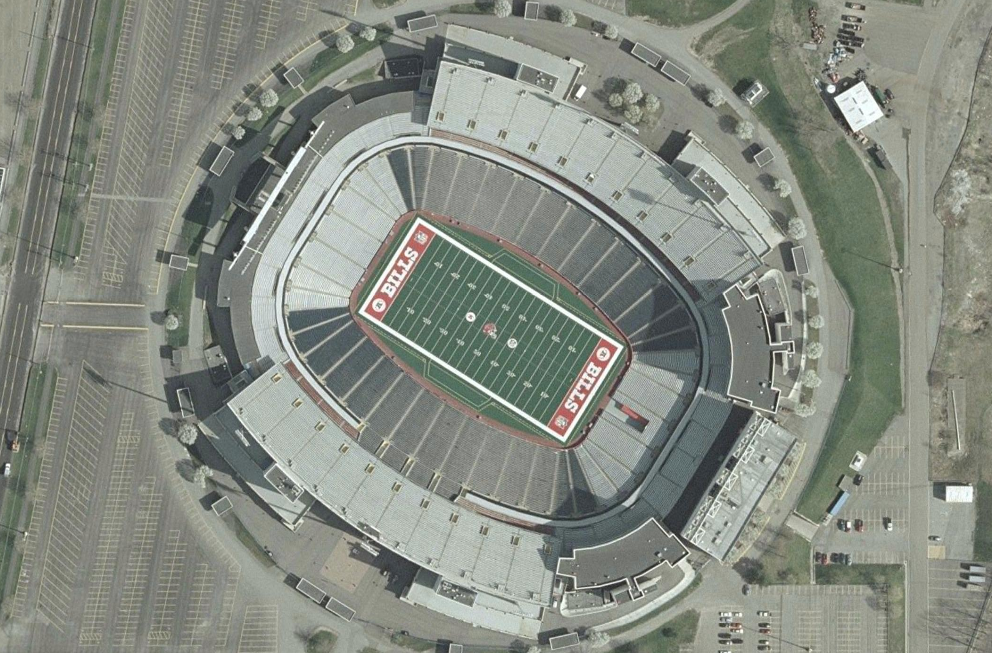
- Rich Stadium, the site of the game.
Houston Oilers (5) (10–6)	Buffalo Bills (4) (11–5)
38	41
Head coach: Jack Pardee	Head coach: Marv Levy
	1	2	3	4	OT	Total
HOU	7	21	7	3	0	38
BUF	3	0	28	7	3	41
- Date: January 3, 1993
- Stadium: Rich Stadium; Orchard Park, New York
- Referee: Gerry Austin
- Attendance: 75,141

TV in the United States
- Network: NBC
- Announcers: Charlie Jones and Todd Christensen

The Comeback or The Choke was a National Football League (NFL) game held on January 3, 1993, as part of the 1992–93 NFL playoffs. The Buffalo Bills overcame a 35–3 deficit to defeat the visiting Houston Oilers 41–38 in overtime and set a record for largest comeback in NFL history, until surpassed by the Minnesota Vikings in 2022. The Bills' 32-point comeback remains the largest comeback in postseason history and the second largest overall. It was also the first time an NFL team with a lead of at least 30 points lost the game.

== Background ==
Before this game, the only time in NFL history that a team failed to win a game that they led by 30 or more points in was a 38–38 tie in a 1960 game (Note: While this was an American Football League contest, it has been considered a part of the NFL's own history since the AFL-NFL merger.) between the Buffalo Bills and Denver Broncos, in which the Broncos rallied from a 38–7 deficit to tie the game at 38, which would end up being the final score. (Note: Regular season overtime was not played in the NFL until 1974.)

Both teams qualified for the playoffs as wild card teams, with Buffalo as the fourth seed and Houston as the fifth seed.

The Buffalo Bills, the American Football Conference (AFC) champions for the previous two seasons, recorded an 11–5 record during the 1992 regular season and finished in second place in the AFC Eastern Division. Buffalo's no-huddle offense led the league in rushing yards (2,436) and ranked second in the league in total offensive yards (6,114 yards). The main keys to their success were their four future Hall of Fame players on offense: Quarterback Jim Kelly, running back Thurman Thomas, and receivers Andre Reed and James Lofton. Buffalo also had a Hall of Fame defensive end, Bruce Smith, who went on to become the NFL's all-time leader in sacks.

Meanwhile, the Houston Oilers finished in second place in the AFC Central Division with a 10–6 record. Houston's run and shoot offense led the league in passing (4,231 yards) and its defense ranked third in the league, allowing only 4,532 total yards. Overall, the team boasted nine Pro Bowl selections, including their quarterback Warren Moon (selected despite missing six games with injuries) and three wide receivers, Curtis Duncan, Haywood Jeffires, and Ernest Givins. The Oilers also had a powerful running attack with Lorenzo White, who rushed for 1,226 yards and caught 57 passes.

The Bills and Oilers had faced each other for the final game of the regular season, with Houston defeating Buffalo, 27–3 in Houston. During that game, Kelly suffered strained ligaments in his knee, leaving backup quarterback Frank Reich to finish the game in his place. Reich completed a mere 11-of-23 passes for 99 yards, with two interceptions and a passer rating of 23.6. With Kelly out, Reich took the reins starting in place of Kelly the following week in the wild card game, which Buffalo hosted. Reich also started the following divisional playoff game in Pittsburgh in which Buffalo also won 24–3 to advance to the AFC Championship game the following week versus the Miami Dolphins.

In addition to losing Kelly, injuries also robbed Buffalo of one of their best defensive players for the upcoming wildcard game: linebacker Cornelius Bennett.

=== Reich and the biggest comeback in college football history ===
As the backup quarterback for the Maryland Terrapins, Reich replaced starter Stan Gelbaugh on November 10, 1984, and led the Terrapins back from a first-half deficit of 31–0 to a 42–40 victory over the Miami Hurricanes under Bernie Kosar. This college record stood until being broken by the 2006 Michigan State vs. Northwestern game.

== Game summary ==
1992–93 AFC Wild Card: Houston Oilers at Buffalo Bills – Game summary

Quarter	1	2	3	4	OT	Total
Oilers	7	21	7	3	0	38
Bills	3	0	28	7	3	41

at Rich Stadium, Buffalo, New York

- Date: January 3, 1993
- Game time: 12:30 p.m. EST
- Game weather: 34 °F (1 °C), Overcast
- Game attendance: 75,141
- Referee: Gerry Austin
- TV announcers (NBC): Charlie Jones and Todd Christensen
- Boxscore

Game information

First quarter

- HOU Haywood Jeffires 3 yard pass from Moon (Al Del Greco kick) 7–0
- BUF Steve Christie 36 yard FG 7–3

Second quarter

- HOU Webster Slaughter 7 yard pass from Moon (Del Greco kick) 14–3
- HOU Curtis Duncan 26 yard pass from Moon (Del Greco kick) 21–3
- HOU Jeffires 27 yard pass from Moon (Del Greco kick) 28–3

Third quarter

- HOU Bubba McDowell 58 yard interception return (Del Greco kick) 35–3
- BUF Davis 1 yard run (Christie kick) 35–10
- BUF Don Beebe 38 yard pass from Reich (Christie kick) 35–17
- BUF Reed 26 yard pass from Reich (Christie kick) 35–24
- BUF Reed 18 yard pass from Reich (Christie kick) 35–31

Fourth quarter

- BUF Reed 17 yard pass from Reich (Christie kick) 35–38
- HOU Del Greco 26 yard FG 38–38

Overtime

- BUF Christie 32 yard FG 38–41

Top passers

- HOU – Warren Moon – 36/50, 371 YDS, 4 TD, 2 INT
- BUF – Frank Reich – 21/34, 289 YDS, 4 TD, INT

Top rushers

- HOU – Lorenzo White – 19 CAR, 75 YDS
- BUF – Kenneth Davis – 13 CAR, 68 YDS, TD

Top receivers

- HOU – Ernest Givins – 9 REC, 117 YDS
- BUF – Andre Reed – 8 REC, 136 YDS, 3 TD

=== First half ===
Houston dominated the game early, as quarterback Warren Moon completed 19 of 22 passes for 218 yards and 4 touchdowns in the first half; Moon had only played in the second quarter of the previous game against the Bills after missing five straight games due to injury. The Oilers held the ball for 21:12, keeping the Bills' high-powered offense off the field for most of the first two quarters. On the opening drive of the first quarter, Moon completed 6 of 7 passes on an 80-yard scoring drive that took over 9 minutes off the clock and ended it with his first touchdown throw to wide receiver Haywood Jeffires for 3 yards to give the Oilers a 7–0 lead. Buffalo responded on their ensuing drive, as Kenneth Davis returned the kickoff 33 yards to the 44-yard line. Reich subsequently led the Bills to the Oilers 18-yard line where Steve Christie made a 36-yard field goal, to cut the score to 7–3. But Moon struck right back, leading the Oilers on a second quarter scoring drive that was nearly identical to their first one, completing 6 of 7 passes on another 80-yard drive and finishing it with a 7-yard touchdown pass to Webster Slaughter. Then after forcing the Bills to a three-and-out, Moon threw a 26-yard touchdown pass to Curtis Duncan. Later on, with 1:15 left in the half, the Oilers drove for another touchdown, aided by an encroachment call against the Bills on fourth down and 1. Moon completed the drive with his second touchdown pass to Jeffires, this one a 27-yarder, and the Oilers went into their locker room with a 28–3 halftime lead.

=== Second half ===
In the Bills' locker room, Defensive Coordinator Walt Corey angrily chided the defense. "I was hollering the same things the fans were hollering at me when we left the field", Corey says. "I can't repeat the words, but the more I talked, the louder I got. The thing that bothered me was their approach. To me, they looked timid. They looked like they were going to get in the right spots, but they weren't going to make anything happen afterward. This is an attitude game. Sometimes you start playing and you're afraid to make things happen or afraid to make a mistake." Nose Tackle Jeff Wright recalled "With every word that came out of Walt's mouth, he reached a new temperature level, until he finally just exploded. He had every right to say the things that he said. We were embarrassing him, we were embarrassing ourselves, we were embarrassing Buffalo Bills fans."

Meanwhile, head coach Marv Levy told his team, "You've got thirty more minutes. Maybe it's the last thirty minutes of your season. When your season's over, you're going to have to live with yourselves and look yourselves in the eyes. You'd well better have reason to feel good about yourselves, regardless of how this game turns out." Steve Tasker praised the "brilliance in his simplicity ... We had been in two Super Bowls, and he appealed to our pride. It wound up working".

Reminding Reich about his comeback while at Maryland, Kelly said "maybe lightning will strike twice" as the team began the second half. The Bills started the 2nd half on their own 36 yard line, and apparently, the words of Corey and Levy did not have any immediate effect, because 1:41 into the third quarter, and on a 3rd and 9, Reich threw a pass that bounced off the hands of tight end Keith McKeller and went into the arms of defensive back Bubba McDowell, who returned the interception 58 yards for a touchdown. Houston now had a 32-point lead, 35–3; it was only the second time all season the Oilers had broken 30 points scored in a game. The Bills' misfortunes were compounded with the loss of Thurman Thomas, who had to leave the game due to a hip injury on the drive, forcing Buffalo to attempt a comeback with a second-string backfield of Reich and Davis.

A Houston radio announcer was immortalized on NFL Films with the statement "The lights are on here at Rich Stadium, they've been on since this morning, you could pretty much turn them out on the Bills right now."

The Bills got a huge assist to start their comeback on the ensuing kickoff. The wind shifted the ball just before it was kicked by Al Del Greco. As a result, it became an unintentional squib kick that the Bills line backer Mark Maddox recovered with great field position at midfield. Buffalo then drove 50 yards in 10 plays, including a pass to Pete Metzelaars that went right through the hands of linebacker Eddie Robinson, and scored with a 1-yard touchdown run by Davis, cutting the deficit to 35–10 when the extra point was added. On the drive, Reich completed a 24-yard pass to tight end Metzelaars and a 16-yard strike to Andre Reed, while Davis kept the drive going with a 5-yard run on fourth down and 2 before finishing it off with a touchdown run with 8:52 left in the 3rd quarter.

The Bills were still behind by 25 points. Steve Christie, Buffalo's kicker, recovered his own kickoff; Levy said that the play was an error, and not a planned onside kick. The Bills scored on the fourth play of their ensuing drive with Reich's 38-yard touchdown pass to wide receiver Don Beebe. On the play, Beebe's left foot went partially out of bounds due to momentum caused by a shove by cornerback Jerry Gray prior to Beebe then getting open for the catch. Had the officials noted the foot on the line, this would have been grounds for a penalty as illegal touching of the football. At the time, the NFL did not have any replay challenge system to challenge the call. The extra point made the score 35–17 with 7:46 left in the third quarter.

Houston was then forced to punt for the first time in the game on their next drive, and Greg Montgomery's 25-yard kick gave Buffalo the ball at their own 41-yard line. Reich started out the ensuing drive with an 18-yard completion to James Lofton. Davis gained 20 yards on a screen pass and then Reich threw a 26-yard touchdown pass to Reed, trimming the lead (after making the extra point) to 35–24. In a span of 10 minutes in the third quarter, the Bills had run 18 plays, gained 176 yards, and scored 21 points, while holding the Oilers' offense to 3 plays for 3 yards.

The situation did not get any better for Houston. On the first play of the Oilers' ensuing possession, Moon's pass was tipped off the hands of Slaughter; Bills' safety Henry Jones intercepted the pass from Moon and returned it 15 yards to the Houston 23-yard line. Three plays later, Buffalo faced fourth down and five on the 18-yard line. Rather than attempt a field goal, Reich connected with Reed for the touchdown. With the score (including the extra point), the Bills had cut their deficit from 32 points to four in a span of just 6:52. On the Oilers' next drive, linebacker Darryl Talley forced a fumble from Moon while sacking him. Houston recovered the fumble, but they were forced to punt, and Montgomery's 24-yard kick gave Buffalo the ball at its 48-yard line. In the third quarter, Buffalo had outscored Houston 28–7 while holding Moon to 2 of 7 completions for 19 yards.

This time, the Bills could not take advantage of their excellent starting field position and had to punt. Moon's run and shoot offense began to move the ball effectively again, aided by a roughing the passer penalty on Bruce Smith that negated linebacker Carlton Bailey's interception. Despite two sacks by Wright on the drive, Houston reached the Buffalo 14-yard line. Al Del Greco attempted a field goal to increase the Oilers' lead, but Montgomery fumbled the snap. Talley recovered the ball and returned it 70 yards, but officials ruled him down by contact when he made the initial recovery, giving Buffalo the ball on their own 26-yard line. After two plays, the Bills faced third down and four. With Houston's defense dropping back and expecting a pass, Reich handed the ball off to Davis, who stormed through the line and took off for a 35-yard gain. Only a diving tackle from defensive back Steve Jackson prevented Davis from taking it all the way for a touchdown. Then Reich went back to passing the ball, completing a short pass to Reed at the Oilers' 17-yard line on third down and two for the first down. With just 3:08 left in the fourth quarter, Reich threw a 17-yard touchdown pass to Reed, giving Buffalo its first lead of the game 38–35 (after the extra point); for the first time all season, the Houston defense (ninth in fewest points allowed that season) had allowed over 29 points. But Moon led Houston downfield on a 63-yard drive to score the tying 26-yard field goal from Del Greco to send the game into overtime. A key play on the drive was an 18-yard completion to Slaughter on fourth down and four from the Bills' 34-yard line.

=== Overtime ===
Houston won the coin toss and got the ball at its 20-yard line. Moon started out the drive with two completions for 7 yards, but his 50th pass attempt of the day turned out to be his last. On third down and three, Moon threw a pass intended for Ernest Givins five yards downfield. Givins was not able to get to the ball and it ended up further downfield into the arms of defensive back Nate Odomes for an interception. After a 2-yard return, Jeffires committed a 15-yard facemask penalty while making the tackle, giving Buffalo a first down on Houston's 20-yard line. Game commentators examined the replay and strongly asserted that Givins was held on the play by Darryl Talley. However, the referees assessed no holding penalty against Buffalo, so they retained possession. After two runs by Davis, Christie kicked a 32-yard field goal to give Buffalo the win, 41–38.

Reich finished the game with 21 of 34 pass completions for 289 yards and 4 touchdowns, with 1 interception. Reed had 8 catches for 136 yards and 3 touchdowns. Davis rushed for 68 yards and a touchdown, while also catching 2 passes for 25 yards and returning a kickoff for 33. Moon recorded 36 of 50 completions for 371 yards and 4 touchdowns, with 2 interceptions. His 36 completions set a playoff record that stood until broken by Drew Brees's 39 completions in 2010, and then broken again by Ben Roethlisberger in 2020 with 47 completions. (Note: Brees's New Orleans Saints also lost their game, as did Roethlisberger's Pittsburgh Steelers.) Givins caught 9 passes for 117 yards. Jeffires recorded 8 catches for 98 yards and 2 touchdowns.

== Aftermath ==
We definitely choked. We got outcoached, outplayed. There's no way we blow a 32-point lead with the talent we have. They made adjustments good enough to win the game. We didn't.

— Cris Dishman of the Oilers, in the locker room after the game

=== Buffalo Bills ===
Many left the stadium while the Oilers had the large lead; Tasker recalled "seeing so many empty seats" in the third quarter and Reich saw "a big wave of people leaving", which Buffalo News reporter Vic Carucci described as "they're pouring out of the gates, getting in their cars, driving home". Beebe's mother Barb, attending the game, later said "I almost never, ever, ever give up, but at that point, I kind of did give up".

Barb Beebe said that her son's 38-yard touchdown catch—which she insisted was not out of bounds—was when she began to gain hope. Because the game was not sold out, NFL blackout rules of the time prohibited television broadcast in the Buffalo area; fans returned when they heard on the radio of the Bills' comeback. Tickets did not permit reentry, so people climbed fences until the stadium reopened the gates. Team general manager Bill Polian recalled how the same fans who had left in disgust after denouncing to him the Bills' inability to beat the Oilers, ran back to their seats praising the team. Kelly said, "the old saying was, 'Did you know that 150,000 people went to the Buffalo Bills football game?'", Levy said "70,000 people were at that game. I've already met 400,000 of them", and Tasker joked "I've met 1.2 million people who say they were in the stadium".

Tasker said that The Comeback is part of Western New York heritage:

It's probably bigger in Buffalo than the Ice Bowl is in Green Bay or the Immaculate Reception is in Pittsburgh, because those cities have experienced eight Super Bowls between them. Since the Bills haven't won any, we kind of hang our hat on that comeback game ... In a way, it was our crowning moment.

Carucci said of the game:

It reset the love affair with that team. People had become jaded, people had become upset with the idea that they just didn't see the success at the end of the rainbow. And now they had this, and this reminded them of how special this football team really is.

The game was Christie's first in the postseason; after kicking the winning field goal he asked "Wow! Are all playoff games like this?" As the lowest seed remaining, Buffalo would play further games on the road. Reich also started the following divisional playoff game in Pittsburgh in which Buffalo also won 24–3 to advance to the AFC Championship game the following week versus the Miami Dolphins. With Kelly back as starter, the Bills won 29–10, advancing to Super Bowl XXVII, where they were beaten by the Dallas Cowboys 52–17.

=== Houston Oilers ===
Tasker heard that "the visiting locker room was like a funeral home" after the game. Oiler (Titan) Cris Dishman told an interviewer, "It was the biggest choke job in history ... I think we have to put another word in the English dictionary to describe this loss because devastated doesn't do it". Melanie Hauser of the Houston Post recalled Dishman "fighting back the tears and refusing to cry", and how "you felt the shock. You heard the anger. You watched some of the players vent; others bite back the tears". While Moon refused to say "choke", "more than a few players" said it; "One even spelled the word out". McDowell said "I apologize to the offense because we lost the damn game. They had them beat"; defensive back Sean Jones said, "To blow a 32-point lead, you need a lot of help". The day after the game, the Oilers fired defensive coordinator Jim Eddy and defensive backs coach Pat Thomas; Eddy was replaced by Buddy Ryan.

In Houston, the game is known as "The Choke". In 2020, Hauser called the loss "the worst day in Houston sports history"; a radio station held a mock funeral for the team after the game. "Choke City" was a Houston Chronicle front-page headline in 1994, given to the city of Houston after the Houston Rockets blew two consecutive commanding fourth-quarter leads at The Summit in the first two games of their Western Conference semifinals match-up versus the Phoenix Suns in the 1994 NBA Playoffs. The Rockets went to Phoenix down 0–2 in the best-of-seven series. It was feared at the time that the Rockets would follow the same fate as the Oilers did. During this era, no Houston-based professional sports team from an existing sports league (the NFL, NBA, or Major League Baseball) had won a championship. The Rockets, however, rallied to win the series and go on to win NBA championships in 1994 and 1995.

In addition, the Oilers' loss marked the beginning of a turbulent period for the franchise. The team suffered a drama-filled 1–4 start the following season, including a blowout loss in a rematch with the Bills, before winning the final eleven games of the season to clinch what became their final playoff appearance in Houston. After blowing yet another double-digit lead (albeit in this case a much smaller 10-point halftime one) and losing in the divisional round to the Kansas City Chiefs at home, Oilers owner Bud Adams cut or traded many of his team's star players, and the Oilers suffered through three losing seasons before deciding to move to Nashville (with an interim stop in Memphis in 1997) to eventually become the Tennessee Titans.

Houston sports radio host Rich Lord said in 2013 that "The Choke" and other Oilers playoff losses were among reasons why the team relocated, and that Houston Texans (the city's current NFL team which began play in 2002) fans continue to expect their team to fail. While stating that had instant replay existed in 1993 "that greatest comeback never would have happened", Dishman reiterated that the Oilers had choked: "I stick with that statement because that's what happened. We didn't finish the game".

== Legacy ==
Christie's kicking shoe from the game is in the Pro Football Hall of Fame in Canton, Ohio. The game was named #1 on NFL Top Ten's Top Ten Comebacks.

The teams next met in the playoffs at Adelphia Coliseum in the 1999–2000 Wild Card round after the Oilers had moved to Nashville and became the Tennessee Titans. Christie made another clutch field goal from 41 yards with 16 seconds left following a Rob Johnson drive that gave the Bills a 16–15 lead. On Christie's ensuing kickoff, fullback Lorenzo Neal fielded the kick and handed it off to tight end Frank Wycheck. Wycheck then threw a cross-field pass to wide receiver Kevin Dyson, who went the remaining 75 yards for a touchdown dubbed the Music City Miracle, reaching the end zone with just 3 seconds left. Following a replay review, referee Phil Luckett upheld the ruling on the field that Wycheck's pass was a lateral and not an illegal forward pass, and the Titans won 22-16 en route to a place in Super Bowl XXXIV after Del Greco's extra point and after the ensuing Bills kickoff return did not score.

On September 25, 2011, the Bills rebounded from a 21–0 deficit to defeat the New England Patriots 34–31. When Rian Lindell kicked the game-winning field goal as time expired, radio play-by-play announcer John Murphy enthusiastically dubbed their victory "The greatest comeback since The Comeback!"

During the 2019 playoffs, the Bills blew a 16-point lead against the Houston expansion franchise Texans in the Wild Card round of the playoffs, which some considered to be revenge for the Comeback game. However, the Texans blew a 24-point lead of their own a week later against the Chiefs.

During the 2020 NFL season, Frank Reich returned to Buffalo as head coach of the Indianapolis Colts at Bills Stadium on January 9, 2021, where his team lost to the Bills in a wild card game. It was the Bills' first playoff win since the 1995 season and only the second since Reich left the roster.

Reich was fired as head coach of the Colts on November 7, 2022, and was replaced with former Pro Bowl center Jeff Saturday. On December 17, 2022, the Minnesota Vikings set a new record for largest comeback in NFL history after coming back from a 33-point halftime deficit to defeat the Colts in overtime, 39–36; the Bills comeback over the Oilers still remains the largest comeback in NFL playoff history.

== Officials ==
- Referee: Gerry Austin (#34)
- Umpire: Bob Boylston (#101)
- Head linesman: Terry Gierke (#72)
- Line judge: Dale Orem (#51)
- Back judge: Paul Baetz (#22)
- Side judge: Mike Carey (#94)
- Field judge: Jack Vaughan (#93)

== See also ==
- 1992–93 NFL playoffs
- Music City Miracle
- Super Bowl LI
- 2019–20 NFL playoffs, which coincidentally featured blown leads by both the Bills and Houston's next and current NFL team, the Texans.
- List of nicknamed NFL games and plays
- FC Barcelona 6–1 Paris Saint-Germain FC, similar comeback from large deficit in second leg of 2017 UEFA Champions League soccer match, known in Spain as "La Remontada" ("The Comeback")
- 2022 Indianapolis Colts–Minnesota Vikings game
