= List of largest comebacks in NFL games =

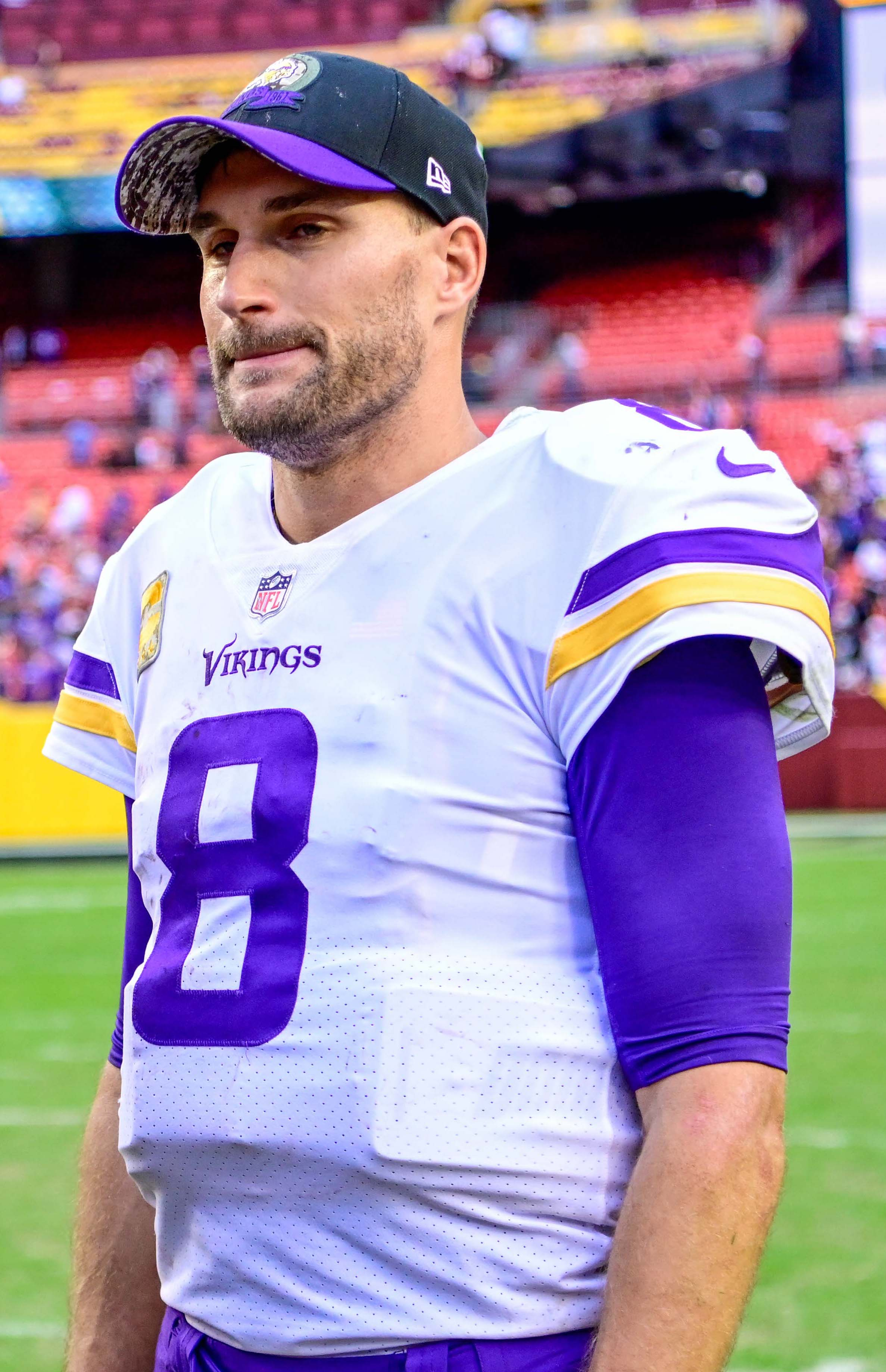
Quarterback Kirk Cousins led the Minnesota Vikings on a record-breaking comeback from a 33–0 deficit in 2022.

This is a list of the largest deficits overcome to win NFL games, from the regular season or postseason. Wins after trailing by 25 points or more have been rare in NFL history, with only nine in over 100 years, including four in the postseason. There have also been two ties after trailing by such a deficit. Comebacks from exactly 24 points behind have been relatively common, with 17 occurrences (two in the playoffs).

The record for the largest NFL comeback is held by the Minnesota Vikings, who overcame a third-quarter deficit of 33–0 to defeat the Indianapolis Colts 39–36 in overtime during Week 15 of the 2022 NFL season. The Colts have been featured in three of the top six comebacks, having also won from 28 points behind and lost from 26 points ahead. The biggest postseason comeback was made by the Buffalo Bills, who overcame a 35–3 deficit at the beginning of the third quarter to defeat the Houston Oilers 41–38 in overtime during the 1992 Wild Card Round, while the biggest Super Bowl comeback came in Super Bowl LI, when the New England Patriots erased a 28–3 third-quarter deficit against the Atlanta Falcons to win in overtime 34–28.

Quarterback Matt Ryan started on both the losing Falcons team in Super Bowl LI and the beaten Colts team in 2022. By contrast, head coach Marv Levy led the Bills to two of the three biggest comebacks of the 20th century.

== Largest deficits overcome to win ==
Largest deficits overcome to win NFL games
Rank	Largest deficit	Season	Week	Winning team	Losing team	Venue	Scores	Notes	Ref
1	33 points	2022	15	Minnesota Vikings	Indianapolis Colts	U.S. Bank Stadium, Minneapolis, Minnesota	Colts led 33–0; Vikings won 39–36 (OT)	The current NFL record. Minnesota gave up return touchdowns from a blocked punt and an interception and trailed 33–0 at halftime. Between 8:22 to play in the 3rd quarter and 2:15 to play in the fourth quarter, the Vikings outscored Indianapolis 36–3; they scored five touchdowns in seven possessions. In overtime, Minnesota drove 60 yards and Greg Joseph won the game on a 40-yard field goal with three seconds left in the extra period.	
2	32 points	1992	Wild Card	Buffalo Bills	Houston Oilers	Rich Stadium, Orchard Park, New York	Oilers led 35–3; Bills won 41–38 (OT)	Playoff record. Backup quarterback Frank Reich led the Bills to four touchdowns between 8:52 and 2:00 of the third quarter to begin the comeback. Buffalo took the lead on Andre Reed's third touchdown catch with 3:08 to in the fourth quarter, before the Oilers forced overtime with a field goal. Nate Odomes intercepted a Warren Moon pass early in overtime, and Steve Christie won the game with a 32-yard field goal. Popularly known as "The Comeback."	
3	28 points	2013	Wild Card	Indianapolis Colts	Kansas City Chiefs	Lucas Oil Stadium, Indianapolis, Indiana	Chiefs led 38–10; Colts won 45–44	The largest comeback not requiring overtime. Starting with 11:47 remaining in the 3rd quarter, Indianapolis scored five touchdowns while conceding only two field goals. After the Colts took the lead with 4:21 remaining, Kansas City drove into Colts territory before turning the ball over on downs. Indianapolis quarterback Andrew Luck threw for four touchdowns on the day and scored another on a fumble recovery.	
3	28 points	1980	14	San Francisco 49ers	New Orleans Saints	Candlestick Park, San Francisco, California	Saints led 35–7; 49ers won 38–35 (OT)	After trailing by 28 points at halftime, San Francisco scored four unanswered touchdowns in the second half and tied the score with 1:50 to play. After forcing a New Orleans punt on the first possession of overtime, the 49ers drove for Ray Wersching's game-winning field goal.	
5	27 points	2022	Wild Card	Jacksonville Jaguars	Los Angeles Chargers	TIAA Bank Field, Jacksonville, Florida	Chargers led 27–0; Jaguars won 31–30	After throwing four interceptions, the Jaguars found themselves in a 27–0 deficit approaching halftime. Starting with a touchdown with 28 seconds left in the second quarter, Jacksonville then outscored the Chargers 31–3 for the rest of the game. The Jaguars successfully converted a two-point conversion after scoring a touchdown, cutting the lead to two points with 5:40 to play in the fourth quarter. After forcing a Chargers punt, the Jaguars drove for Riley Patterson's 36-yard winning field goal.	
6	26 points	1997	4	Buffalo Bills	Indianapolis Colts	Rich Stadium, Orchard Park, New York	Colts led 26–0; Bills won 37–35	Between 2:12 to play in the 2nd quarter and 1:14 to play in the 4th quarter, Buffalo outscored Indianapolis 37–3. Trailing by eight points, the Colts drove for a late touchdown but failed on a game-tying two-point conversion attempt.	
7	25 points	2016	Super Bowl	New England Patriots	Atlanta Falcons	NRG Stadium, Houston, Texas	Falcons led 28–3; Patriots won 34–28 (OT)	Super Bowl record. Starting with 2:06 to play in the third quarter, New England scored 25 unanswered points from four offensive drives. They tied the game with 57 seconds left in regulation, then won it with a touchdown on the first drive of overtime.	
7	25 points	2014	5	Cleveland Browns	Tennessee Titans	LP Field, Nashville, Tennessee	Titans led 28–3; Browns won 29–28	Largest comeback by a road team. The Titans ran no further plays in Cleveland territory after taking their 25-point lead in the second quarter. Cleveland scored 26 unanswered points, beginning 12 seconds before halftime and finishing with 1:09 left in the game.	
7	25 points	1987	9	St. Louis Cardinals	Tampa Bay Buccaneers	Busch Stadium, St. Louis, Missouri	Buccaneers led 28–3; Cardinals won 31–28	The largest fourth-quarter comeback. Starting with 12:42 remaining in the game, St. Louis scored 28 unanswered points to take the lead with 2:01 to play. A 53-yard field goal attempt by Buccaneers kicker Donald Igwebuike struck the crossbar as time expired.	

== Largest deficits overcome to tie ==
Largest deficits overcome to tie NFL games
Rank	Largest deficit	Season	Week	Away team	Home team	Venue	Scores	Notes	Ref
1	31 points	1960	12	Buffalo Bills	Denver Broncos	Bears Stadium, Denver, Colorado	Bills led 38–7 tied 38–38	AFL game. Denver scored 31 unanswered points starting late in the third quarter, tying the game on a field goal with four seconds left in the game. No overtime was played. (Note: Overtime was not used in professional football for regular season games until the NFL adopted it in 1974.)	
3	28 points	1947	2	Cleveland Browns	New York Yankees	Yankee Stadium, New York, New York	Yankees led 28–0 tied 28–28	AAFC game. Beginning in the 2nd quarter and ending midway through the final quarter, Cleveland scored 28 unanswered points. New York missed out on a game-winning field goal attempt after mismanaging the clock. No overtime was played.	
3	28 points	1948	2	Philadelphia Eagles	Los Angeles Rams	Memorial Coliseum, Los Angeles, California	Eagles led 28–0 tied 28–28	Beginning with approximately two minutes to play in the third quarter, and finishing with fewer than 30 seconds to play, the Rams scored four unanswered touchdowns. Philadelphia missed a potential game-winning 52-yard field goal as time expired. No overtime was played.	

== Largest deficits overcome in postseason ==
Largest deficits overcome to win NFL postseason games
Rank	Largest deficit	Season	Round	Away team	Home team	Venue	Scores	Notes	Ref
1	32 points	1992	AFC Wild Card	Houston Oilers	Buffalo Bills	Rich Stadium, Orchard Park, New York	Oilers led 35–3; Bills won 41–38	Largest comeback in playoff history	
2	28 points	2013	AFC Wild Card	Kansas City Chiefs	Indianapolis Colts	Lucas Oil Stadium, Indianapolis, Indiana	Chiefs led 38–10; Colts won 45–44	Colts scored 35 points in second half	
3	27 points	2022	AFC Wild Card	Los Angeles Chargers	Jacksonville Jaguars	TIAA Bank Field, Jacksonville, Florida	Chargers led 27–0; Jaguars won 31–30	Chargers led until final play, when Riley Patterson's 36-yard field goal was good with :00 remaining	
4	25 points	2016	Super Bowl LI	New England Patriots	Atlanta Falcons	NRG Stadium, Houston, Texas	Falcons led 28–3; Patriots won 34-28	Largest comeback in championship game in history, trailed by 19 in fourth quarter	
5	24 points	2002	NFC Wild Card	New York Giants	San Francisco 49ers	Candlestick Park, San Francisco, California	Giants led 38–14; 49ers won 39–38	49ers scored 25 unanswered points in the last 17 minutes of the game; Giants' last-second field goal went awry due to bad snap	
5	24 points	2019	AFC Divisional	Houston Texans	Kansas City Chiefs	Arrowhead Stadium, Kansas City, Missouri	Texans led 24–0; Chiefs won 51–31	Chiefs scored four touchdowns in the span of nine minutes to take the lead by halftime	
6	20 points	1957	Western Conference championship	Detroit Lions	San Francisco 49ers	Kezar Stadium, San Francisco, California	49ers led 27–7; Lions won 31–27	Lions scored 24 unanswered points in second half to reach NFL Championship Game; last road playoff win for Detroit as of 2026	
7	18 points	1972	NFC Divisional	Dallas Cowboys	San Francisco 49ers	Candlestick Park, San Francisco, California	49ers led 21–3; Cowboys won 30–28		
7	18 points	1985	AFC Divisional	Cleveland Browns	Miami Dolphins	Miami Orange Bowl, Miami, Florida	Browns led 21–3; Dolphins won 24–21		
7	18 points	2006	AFC Championship	New England Patriots	Indianapolis Colts	RCA Dome, Indianapolis, Indiana	Patriots led 21–3; Colts won 38–34		
7	18 points	2017	AFC Wild Card	Tennessee Titans	Kansas City Chiefs	Arrowhead Stadium, Kansas City, Missouri	Chiefs led 21–3; Titans won 22–21		
7	18 points	2021	AFC Championship	Cincinnati Bengals	Kansas City Chiefs	Arrowhead Stadium, Kansas City, Missouri	Chiefs led 21–3; Bengals won 27–24 (OT)		
7	18 points	2025	NFC Wild Card	Green Bay Packers	Chicago Bears	Soldier Field, Chicago, Illinois	Packers led 21–3; Bears won 31–27	Chicago trailed 21–3 at halftime and 21–6 through three quarters, only to outscore Green Bay 25–6 in the fourth on the way to its first playoff win in 15 years.	

== See also ==
- Comeback (sports)
