= Tra Blake =

American football official

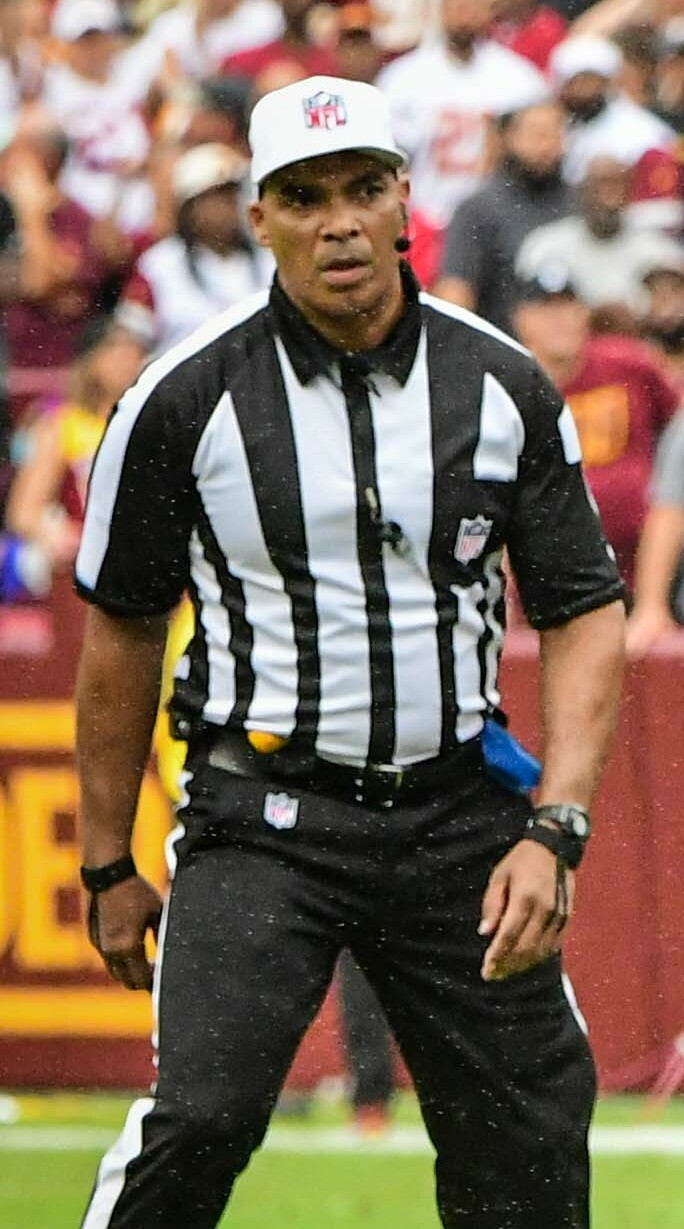
- Blake in 2022
- Education: University of Central Florida
- Occupation: NFL official (2020–present)

Jerome "Tra" Blake is an American professional football official in the National Football League (NFL) since the 2020 NFL season, wearing uniform number 33 until 2021; he now wears uniform number 3.

== Career ==
Blake officiated in Conference USA and the Atlantic Coast Conference, where he worked at deep wing and referee positions. Blake was also a referee for the Alliance of American Football in 2019 and the XFL in 2020.

Blake was hired by the NFL in 2020 as a field judge. He was reassigned to the umpire position in 2021, and was promoted to referee for the start of the 2022 NFL season following the retirement of Tony Corrente.

=== 2024 crew ===
- R: Tra Blake
- U: Carl Paganelli
- DJ: Patrick Turner
- LJ: Tom Eaton
- FJ: Mearl Robinson
- SJ: Don Willard
- BJ: Grantis Bell
- RO: Tyler Cerimeli
- RA: Tim Robinson

On October 24, 2024, during a regular season game between the Minnesota Vikings and the Los Angeles Rams, Blake controversially missed a face mask penalty when Rams linebacker Byron Young brought down quarterback Sam Darnold in the end zone for a safety.

== Reassignment ==
In 2025, Blake was reassigned back to the umpire position. He was replaced by Alex Moore.

== Personal life ==
Blake resides in Clermont, Florida. Outside of the NFL, Blake is a quality assurance director for an Orlando-based pharmaceutical software company.
