= Frank Reich =

American football player and coach (born 1961)

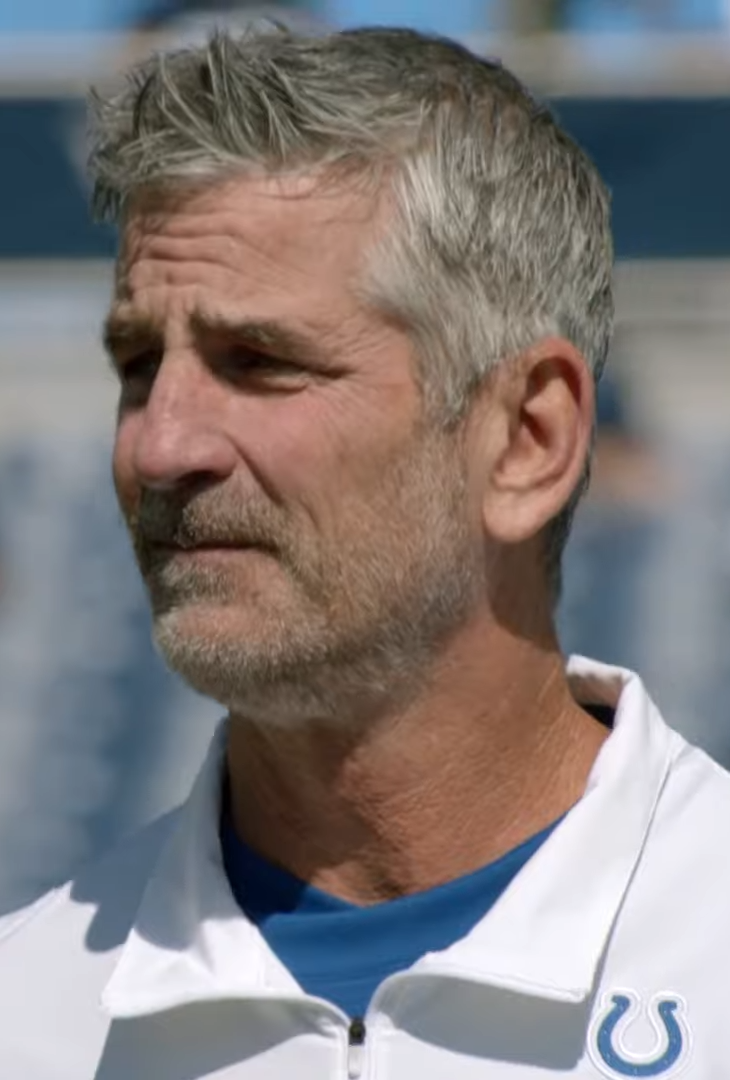
- Reich with the Indianapolis Colts in 2021

New York Jets
- Title: Offensive coordinator

Personal information
- Born: December 4, 1961 (age 64); Freeport, New York, U.S.
- Listed height: 6 ft 4 in (1.93 m)
- Listed weight: 210 lb (95 kg)

Career information
- Position: Quarterback (No. 14, 7)
- High school: Cedar Crest (Lebanon, Pennsylvania)
- College: Maryland (1980–1984)
- NFL draft: 1985: 3rd round, 57th overall pick

Career history

Playing
- Buffalo Bills (1985–1994); Carolina Panthers (1995); New York Jets (1996); Detroit Lions (1997–1998)

Coaching
- Indianapolis Colts (2006–2011); Coaching intern (2006–2007); Offensive coaching staff assistant (2008); Quarterbacks coach (2009–2010); Wide receivers coach (2011); Arizona Cardinals (2012) Wide receivers coach; San Diego Chargers (2013–2015); Quarterbacks coach (2013); Offensive coordinator (2014–2015); Philadelphia Eagles (2016–2017) Offensive coordinator; Indianapolis Colts (2018–2022) Head coach; Carolina Panthers (2023) Head coach; Stanford (2025) Interim head coach; New York Jets (2026–present) Offensive coordinator

Awards and highlights
- As offensive coordinator: Super Bowl champion (LII); As coaching intern: Super Bowl champion (XLI)

Career NFL statistics
- Passing attempts: 932
- Passing completions: 508
- Completion percentage: 54.5%
- TD–INT: 40–36
- Passing yards: 6,075
- Passer rating: 72.9
- Stats at Pro Football Reference

Head coaching record
- Regular season: 41–43–1 (.488)
- Postseason: 1–2 (.333)
- Career: NCAA: 4–8 (.333); NFL: 42–45–1 (.483)
- Coaching profile at Pro Football Reference

Frank Michael Reich (/raɪk/; RYKE; born December 4, 1961) is an American professional football coach and former quarterback who is currently the offensive coordinator for the New York Jets of the National Football League (NFL). He played 14 seasons in the NFL.

Reich played college football for the Maryland Terrapins and was selected by the Buffalo Bills in the third round of the 1985 NFL draft. He spent most of his career backing up Jim Kelly, although Reich achieved recognition after leading the Bills to the NFL's largest postseason comeback during the 1992–93 NFL playoffs, which was also the largest comeback in any game, including the regular season, in NFL history until December 17, 2022, when the Minnesota Vikings staged a comeback against the Colts, four games after Reich had been fired from his head-coaching position and been replaced by interim head coach Jeff Saturday. The Vikings' comeback was 33 points, one more than the Reich and the Bills' comeback against the Houston Oilers in January 1993. Reich was also the quarterback in a 1984 game between Maryland and the Miami Hurricanes where Maryland completed the greatest comeback in NCAA Division I Football Bowl Subdivision history, a record which stood until 2006.

After retiring as a player, Reich began a coaching career. Holding assistant positions from 2008 to 2017, he was the offensive coordinator for the Philadelphia Eagles when they won their first Super Bowl title in Super Bowl LII. Reich later served as the head coach of the Indianapolis Colts from 2018 to 2022 and guided the team to two playoff appearances. He was the Carolina Panthers' head coach in 2023 before being fired before the end of the season after a 1–10 record. In 2025, Reich was the interim coach for Stanford before working as an advisor to new permanent head coach Tavita Pritchard until he joined the Jets.

== Playing career ==
=== High school ===
Reich, who is of German descent, attended Cedar Crest High School in Lebanon, Pennsylvania, where he played baseball, football, and basketball. Reich started on the football team for his last two years in high school. Reich played quarterback in the Big 33 Football Classic in 1980 following his senior year of high school.

=== College career ===
Reich was accepted to the University of Maryland on an athletic scholarship and played for the Maryland Terrapins football team. He was both backup to and roommate of starter Boomer Esiason for three years.

The biggest highlight of Reich's college career was the comeback he led against the Miami Hurricanes on November 10, 1984, at the Miami Orange Bowl. Reich came off the bench to play for Stan Gelbaugh, who had previously replaced him as the starter after Reich separated his shoulder in the fourth week of the season against Wake Forest. Quarterback Bernie Kosar had led Miami to a 31–0 halftime lead. At the start of the third quarter, Reich led the Terrapins on multiple scoring drives. Three touchdowns in the third quarter and a fourth at the start of the final quarter turned what was a blowout into a close game. With Miami leading 34–28, Reich hit Greg Hill with a 68-yard touchdown pass, which deflected off the hands of Miami safety Darrell Fullington to take the lead. Maryland scored once more to cap a 42–9 second half, and won 42–40, completing what was then the biggest comeback in NCAA history.

=== National Football League ===
Reich was selected by the Buffalo Bills in the third round (57th overall) in the 1985 NFL draft. The Bills had already drafted future Hall of Famer Jim Kelly in 1983 and when Kelly signed with the Bills in 1986, Reich was relegated to a role as backup.

Reich got his first start when Kelly went down with a shoulder injury in 1989. Reich led the Bills to two straight victories. He rallied the Bills in the fourth quarter by throwing two drives down the field for a 23–20 victory over the previously unbeaten Los Angeles Rams. This first game for Reich occurred in front of a Rich Stadium crowd of 76,231 and a Monday Night Football audience. In Super Bowl XXV, kicker Scott Norwood famously missed the potential game winning field goal wide-right, partially because Reich, as the holder on the attempt, mistakenly aligned the laces to the right, positioning the kicked ball to fade right once in the air.

Reich returned the following year, however when Kelly was injured again late in the 1990 season. Reich provided the Bills with two key wins, clinching them the AFC East title and home field advantage throughout the playoffs.

During the final game of the 1992 regular season, the Houston Oilers defeated Buffalo 27–3 in Houston, where Kelly suffered strained ligaments in his knee and yielded to Reich to finish the game in his place. With Kelly out, Reich took the reins as the starter for the wild card game the following week, on January 3, 1993. The wild card game was a rematch with the Oilers, hosted in Buffalo, where they led the Bills 35–3 early in the third quarter, but Reich then led the Bills on a 38–3 run en route to a 41–38 overtime victory. The rally from a 32-point deficit remained the largest comeback in NFL history until the Minnesota Vikings made a 33-point comeback against the Indianapolis Colts on December 17, 2022. Reich started his second consecutive playoff game, as the Bills defeated the Pittsburgh Steelers 24–3 in the divisional round. This made Reich one of a handful of quarterbacks who is undefeated as a starter in postseason play, as well as the only one with more than one start to his credit. Kelly recovered and started the AFC Championship where the Bills defeated the Miami Dolphins 29–10. During Super Bowl XXVII, the Bills faced the Dallas Cowboys and Reich again replaced an injured Kelly in the first half of the Super Bowl. Reich led the Bills to 10 points to make the score 31–17, with a possible comeback well within the Bills' capability as the third quarter concluded. However, in the fourth quarter, the Cowboys scored 21 unanswered points to win 52–17, and Reich finished the game with two interceptions.

After giving the Bills one more comeback victory late in the 1993 NFL season, Reich signed with the expansion Carolina Panthers in March 1995 to start off their first year. He threw the first touchdown pass in franchise history to former Bills player Pete Metzelaars in Atlanta against the Falcons. Their first home game was in Week 3 against the Rams at Memorial Stadium in Clemson, as Bank of America Stadium was still under construction. The Panthers had drafted Kerry Collins as their intended franchise quarterback, but Reich was the starter for the first three games until Collins was deemed ready to take the starting job. Reich was sacked nine times on September 3 at Atlanta, a franchise record he shares with Cam Newton.

In 1996, Reich was signed by the New York Jets, where he started seven games.

In 1997, Reich signed with the Detroit Lions, reuniting him with his coach at Maryland, Bobby Ross. Reich appeared in six games in 1997, all in relief, and six games in 1998, including two starts. Reich retired following the 1998 NFL season.

In 2014, Pro Football Hall of Fame Executive Bill Polian, who was general manager of the Bills when they drafted Reich, called him "the greatest backup quarterback in NFL history."

== Coaching career ==
=== Indianapolis Colts ===
Reich was a coaching intern for the Indianapolis Colts from 2006 to 2007. In 2008, he served as an offensive coaching staff assistant for the Colts. After Tony Dungy retired following the 2008 season, former Colts quarterback coach Jim Caldwell took over as head coach and Reich became the new quarterbacks coach. Reich switched to wide receivers coach in 2011, but was dismissed when the entire coaching staff was fired after a 2–14 season.

=== Arizona Cardinals ===
Reich was the wide receivers coach for the Arizona Cardinals in 2012 under head coach Ken Whisenhunt, but along with Whisenhunt and other offensive coaches, was dismissed on December 31, 2012. Reich was not retained under new head coach Bruce Arians.

=== San Diego Chargers ===
Reich was hired by the San Diego Chargers, along with Whisenhunt, in 2013. When Whisenhunt left to become head coach of the Tennessee Titans in 2014, Reich was promoted to offensive coordinator. On January 4, 2016, he was fired from his position as offensive coordinator after the Chargers finished 31st in rushing and struggled on offense.

=== Philadelphia Eagles ===
On January 20, 2016, Reich was hired as the offensive coordinator for the Philadelphia Eagles. He went on to win Super Bowl LII over the New England Patriots with the team in the 2017 season.

=== Indianapolis Colts (second stint) ===
On February 11, 2018, Reich was named the new head coach of the Colts, seven years after he had been fired as wide receivers coach.

After losing his first career game against the Cincinnati Bengals, Reich earned his first win as a head coach over the Washington Redskins in Week 2. During Week 3 against his former team the Eagles, with the Colts down 20–16 with seconds left in the game, Reich pulled starting quarterback Andrew Luck and put in Jacoby Brissett to attempt a Hail Mary pass from his own 46-yard line. Brissett overthrew several players in the back of the end zone and the Colts lost the game. The move was questioned by some journalists and fans, and led to some speculation about the health of Luck's shoulder, although Reich and Luck both said it was purely because Brissett had a stronger throwing arm. The following week against the Houston Texans, Luck led the Colts back from down 28–10 in the third quarter, including a game-tying two-point conversion with 51 seconds left, but the team lost in overtime, 37–34. Reich was the center of controversy after Indianapolis failed to convert a 4th-and-4 on their own 43 and the Texans kicked the game-winning field goal, although he afterward said, "I'll just address it now. We're not playing to tie. We're going for it 10 times out of 10." After a 1–5 start, Reich led the Colts to a 10–6 record, winning nine of their final 10 games. Indianapolis became just the third team in NFL history to make the playoffs following a 1–5 start and also reached their first postseason appearance since 2014. In the Wild Card Round, the Colts defeated the Texans 21–7 before falling to the Kansas City Chiefs 31–13 in the Divisional Round.

Following Luck's unexpected retirement ahead of the 2019 season, Reich's Indianapolis tenure became noted for quarterback instability, with the team starting Brissett in 2019, Philip Rivers in 2020, Carson Wentz in 2021, and Matt Ryan and Sam Ehlinger in 2022.

Reich guided the Colts to a playoff berth in 2020, but Rivers decided to retire after the season, forcing the team to look for another starting quarterback.

For the 2021 season, the Colts traded for Carson Wentz, whom Reich had worked with when he was the Philadelphia Eagles' offensive coordinator. Wentz rebounded with the Colts, leading the team to a 9–6 record and having a 98% chance to make the playoffs with two games remaining in the season, according to FiveThirtyEight. However, Wentz faded at the end of the season as the Colts lost both of those games, including a shocking 26–11 Week 18 loss to the Jacksonville Jaguars, who entered the game with a league-worst 2–14 record. Minutes after that loss, the Pittsburgh Steelers, who needed the Colts to lose in order to clinch a playoff berth, won their overtime game against the Baltimore Ravens, thus eliminating the Colts from the playoffs. Colts owner Jim Irsay had lost faith in Wentz for a lack of locker room leadership and ordered his release, despite having no starting quarterback lined up yet. Reich had reportedly apologized to Irsay for vouching for Wentz.

For the 2022 season, the Colts traded for Matt Ryan, whom Irsay considered a significant upgrade over Wentz. Following a Week 7 loss to the Tennessee Titans, Reich announced that Ryan had a shoulder injury and would be benched in favor of Ehlinger. After a 3–5–1 start to the 2022 season, Reich was fired on November 7.

=== Carolina Panthers ===
On January 26, 2023, the Carolina Panthers hired Reich to be their next head coach. He was the sixth head coach in franchise history, and the first with an offensive background; all but two candidates were offense-minded coaches.

After a 1–10 start, the Panthers fired Reich on November 27. At the time of his firing, the Panthers offense was 29th in sacks allowed while rookie quarterback Bryce Young struggled with one of the worst passer ratings in the league. Reich was the first head coach to be fired midseason in back-to-back years, and his 11-game stint was the fourth shortest for a head coach in league history. His only victory as Panthers head coach occurred in week 8 against the Houston Texans, 15–13, on a field goal as time expired.

=== Stanford ===
On March 31, 2025, Reich was hired as the interim head coach at Stanford University, replacing Troy Taylor. Stanford announced Tavita Pritchard as its permanent head coach on November 28, with Reich remaining at Stanford as a senior advisor within the football program until leaving for the New York Jets a couple of months later.

=== New York Jets ===
On February 4, 2026, Reich was hired to be the new offensive coordinator for the New York Jets under head coach Aaron Glenn.

== Career statistics ==
=== NFL ===
==== Regular season ====
Legend
	Led the league
**Bold**	Career high

Year	Team	Games			Passing								Rushing					Sacked		Fumbles	
Year	Team	GP	GS	Record	Cmp	Att	Pct	Yds	Y/A	TD	Int	Rtg	Att	Yds	Y/A	Lng	TD	Sck	SckY	Fum	Lost
1985	BUF	1	0	—	1	1	**100.0**	19	**19.0**	0	0	**118.7**	0	0	—	0	0	0	0	0	0
1986	BUF	3	0	—	9	19	47.4	104	5.5	2	4	24.8	1	0	0.0	0	0	2	4	1	1
1987	BUF	0	0	DNP																	
1988	BUF	3	0	—	0	0	—	0	0.0	0	0	—	3	–3	-1.0	–1	0	0	0	0	0
1989	BUF	7	3	**3–0**	53	87	60.9	701	8.1	7	2	103.7	9	30	**3.3**	9	0	4	24	2	2
1990	BUF	16	2	1–1	36	63	57.1	469	7.4	2	0	91.3	15	24	1.6	9	0	6	41	1	1
1991	BUF	16	1	0–1	27	41	65.9	305	7.4	6	2	107.2	13	6	0.5	8	0	4	42	0	0
1992	BUF	16	0	—	24	47	51.1	221	4.7	0	2	46.5	9	–9	-1.0	–1	0	9	76	3	1
1993	BUF	15	0	—	16	26	61.5	153	5.9	2	0	103.5	6	–6	-1.0	–1	0	6	47	0	0
1994	BUF	16	2	0–2	56	93	60.2	568	6.1	1	4	63.4	6	3	0.5	5	0	7	57	1	0
1995	CAR	3	3	0–3	37	84	44.0	441	5.3	2	2	58.7	1	3	3.0	3	0	12	**100**	3	2
1996	NYJ	10	7	1–6	**175**	**331**	52.9	**2,205**	6.7	**15**	**16**	68.9	**18**	**31**	1.7	**10**	0	**14**	94	**9**	**8**
1997	DET	6	0	—	11	30	36.7	121	4.0	0	2	21.7	4	–4	-1.0	–1	0	0	0	2	1
1998	DET	6	2	0–2	63	110	57.3	768	7.0	5	4	78.9	6	3	0.0	5	0	4	18	2	1
Career		118	20	5–15	508	932	54.5	6,075	6.5	40	36	72.9	91	78	0.9	10	0	68	503	22	16

==== Postseason ====
Year	Team	Games			Passing								Rushing					Sacked		Fumbles	
Year	Team	GP	GS	Record	Cmp	Att	Pct	Yds	Y/A	TD	Int	Rtg	Att	Yds	Y/A	Lng	TD	Sck	SckY	Fum	Lost
1988	BUF	0	0	DNP																	
1989	BUF	0	0	DNP																	
1990	BUF	3	0	—	0	0	—	0	0.0	0	0	—	2	–1	-0.5	0	0	0	0	0	0
1991	BUF	3	0	—	1	1	**100.0**	11	**11.0**	0	0	**112.5**	3	–3	-1.0	–1	0	0	0	0	0
1992	BUF	4	2	**2–0**	**55**	**88**	62.5	**643**	7.3	**7**	**3**	96.9	**5**	–4	-0.8	–1	0	**6**	**37**	**3**	**3**
1993	BUF	3	0	—	0	0	—	0	0.0	0	0	—	0	0	—	—	0	0	0	0	0
1997	DET	1	0	—	11	15	73.3	129	8.6	0	0	99.0	1	**5**	**5.0**	**5**	0	2	9	0	0
Career		14	2	2–0	67	104	64.4	783	7.5	7	3	97.6	11	–3	-0.3	5	0	8	46	3	3

=== College ===
Year	Team	Games	Passing						
Year	Team	GP	Att	Cmp	Pct	Yds	TD	Int	Rtg
1982	Maryland	3	3	2	66.7	17	0	1	47.6
1983	Maryland	6	38	22	57.9	241	1	1	114.6
1984	Maryland	9	169	108	63.9	1,446	9	5	147.4
Career		18	210	132	62.9	1,704	10	7	140.1

== Head coaching record ==
=== NFL ===
Team	Year	Regular season					Postseason			
Team	Year	Won	Lost	Ties	Win %	Finish	Won	Lost	Win %	Result
IND	2018	10	6	0	.625	2nd in AFC South	1	1	.500	Lost to Kansas City Chiefs in AFC Divisional Game
IND	2019	7	9	0	.438	3rd in AFC South	—	—	—	—
IND	2020	11	5	0	.688	2nd in AFC South	0	1	.000	Lost to Buffalo Bills in AFC Wild Card Game
IND	2021	9	8	0	.529	2nd in AFC South	—	—	—	—
IND	2022	3	5	1	.389	Fired	—	—	—	—
IND total		40	33	1	.547		1	2	.333	
CAR	2023	1	10	0	.091	Fired	—	—	—	—
CAR total		1	10	0	.091		0	0	.000	
Total		41	43	1	.488		1	2	.333	

=== College ===
Year	Team	Overall	Conference	Standing	Bowl/playoffs
Stanford Cardinal (Atlantic Coast Conference) (2025)
2025	Stanford	4–8	3–5	12th	
Stanford:		4–8	3–5		
Total:		4–8			

== Personal life ==
Reich's German American father, Frank Sr., played for the Penn State Nittany Lions from 1953 to 1955 as a center and linebacker. He was drafted by the Philadelphia Eagles in the 14th round of the 1956 NFL draft, but did not play in the National Football League. Frank Reich Sr. was a teacher in technology education and also a football coach at Lebanon High School, retiring in 1992. Reich's brother, Joe, was the head coach at Wingate; a position he held from 2001 to 2023, until he was promoted to Head Athletic Director on November 14, 2023.

Throughout Reich's NFL career, he remained a devout Christian. Reich is a motivational speaker utilizing the great comebacks and the importance of God as a main keynote of his speeches. He credits the song "In Christ Alone" by Michael English as his inspiration. Reich attended the Charlotte Campus of Reformed Theological Seminary in Charlotte and he earned a Master of Divinity degree. Reich served as president of RTS' Charlotte campus from 2003 to 2006. He was also a pastor at Ballantyne Presbyterian until he moved to Indianapolis.

Reich and his wife, Linda, have three daughters.
