= Snowball Game (1985) =

1985 American football game

The Snowball Game
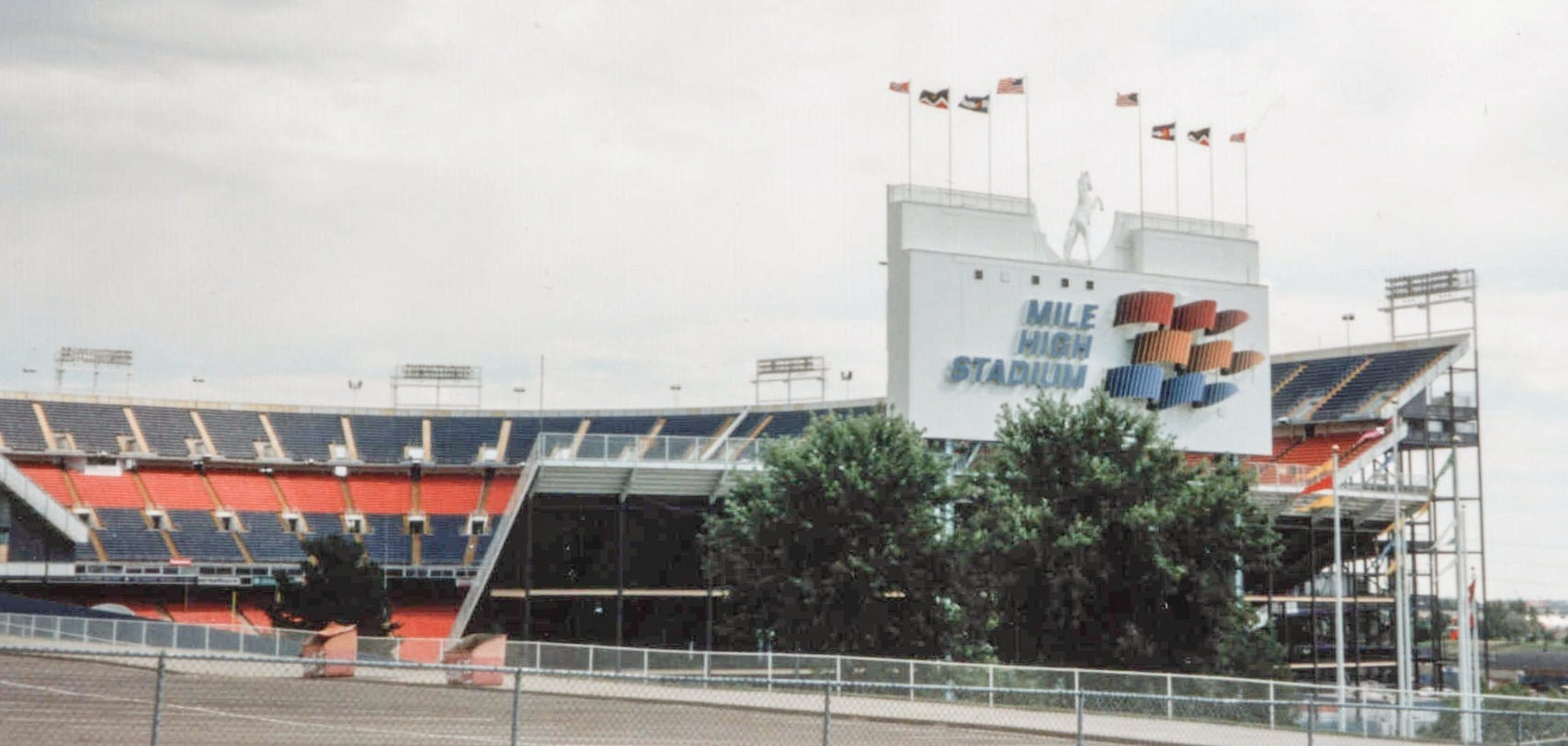
- Mile High Stadium, the site of the game
San Francisco 49ers (5–4)	Denver Broncos (6–3)
16	17
Head coach: Bill Walsh	Head coach: Dan Reeves
	1	2	3	4	Total
SF	0	3	10	3	16
DEN	7	7	0	3	17
- Date: November 11, 1985
- Stadium: Mile High Stadium; Denver, Colorado
- Referee: Jim Tunney
- Attendance: 73,173

TV in the United States
- Network: ABC
- Announcers: Frank Gifford, Joe Namath and O. J. Simpson

In American football, the Snowball Game was the November 11, 1985, National Football League game between the San Francisco 49ers and Denver Broncos. It was notable for a play in which spectators at Denver's Mile High Stadium disrupted a 49ers' field goal attempt by throwing snowballs from the stands.

== Game summary ==
Denver scored first with a 3-yard touchdown pass from John Elway to Gene Lang. San Francisco failed to mount any offense on their first three possessions, gaining a total of only 27 yards. Quarterback Joe Montana was sacked twice, for losses of 9 and 10 yards respectively. They were eventually able to answer with a Ray Wersching field goal in the second quarter. Elway threw a 6-yard touchdown pass to Steve Watson, and a second 49ers field goal attempt was disrupted by fans, leaving the Broncos up 14–3 at halftime.

The 49ers had more success in the third quarter, with a touchdown pass from Montana to Mike Wilson, and a Wersching field goal. They took the lead in the fourth quarter with another field goal, but Rich Karlis' 24-yard field goal with 1:27 left gave Denver a 17–16 victory.

== The snowball ==
On their last possession of the first half, the 49ers mounted a nine-play drive which ended in a 19-yard field goal attempt. Before holder Matt Cavanaugh received the snap from center, a snowball thrown from the stands landed just in front of him. Distracted, he mishandled the football and was unable to hold it for kicker Ray Wersching. In desperation he picked up the ball and attempted a forward pass, but there were no receivers downfield and it fell incomplete. No penalties or palpably unfair acts were called, and the Broncos took over on downs. They went on to win 17–16, making the failed field goal a pivotal factor.

After the game, referee Jim Tunney explained, "We have no recourse in terms of a foul or to call it on the home team or the fans. There's nothing in the rule book that allows us to do that." He ordered an increase in stadium security at halftime, and no further incidents occurred.

Cavanaugh later said, "I saw the snowball. It broke my concentration. I'm not sure if I got the ball back up in time to kick it, but there must not have been time because Ray decided not to kick it." 49ers center Randy Cross said, "I saw the snowball explode right after I snapped the ball. The ball and the snowball hit right at the same time. It definitely made a difference."

Broncos coach Dan Reeves said, "I don't condone the snowball throwing. There is no place for that kind of activity in pro football. I hope we don't ever see that again." He also expressed doubt that it had disrupted the play, saying "I don't think that Cavanaugh thought it affected him because if it did, he'd still be standing there arguing with the official right now", and "I think if you shot me with a 30.06 when I was a holder – you've still got to catch that football." New York Giants general manager George Young called it "a disgrace when you have a game that's decided on something like a snowball." (Note: Ten years later, the Giants – with Young as GM and Reeves as coach – would play host to a similar incident when their fans threw snowballs onto the field in a game against the San Diego Chargers.)

On November 13, Broncos management announced new policies to eject, prosecute, and revoke the season tickets of any fans found throwing snowballs at Mile High Stadium. A newspaper analyst suggested that while the ejection and prosecution of a fan for throwing snowballs may not have any effect, revoking season tickets might because in Denver it's "akin to banishment."

On November 14, NFL rules committee chairman Tex Schramm opined that officials should have intervened, saying "to me, the referee should have killed the play right at that instant, regardless of what happened to the kick."

The San Francisco Examiner offered $500 for an interview with the snowball thrower. A young man (whose name was not disclosed by the paper) came forward on November 15, apologizing for the incident and refusing the money.

"Everybody around us starting calling us jerks...," he said. "That's when I realized that it was stupid. And that's why I'm giving away the tickets for the San Diego game (on Sunday) and going on vacation. I'm taking a lot of ribbing on this and it's not all good-natured."

== Scoring summary ==
- DEN – Lang 3 yard pass from Elway (Karlis kick)
- SF – FG Wersching 26
- DEN – Watson 6 yard pass from Elway (Karlis kick)
- SF – Wilson 13 yard pass from Montana (Wersching kick)
- SF – FG Wersching 22
- SF – FG Wersching 45
- DEN – FG Karlis 24

== Officials ==
- Referee: Jim Tunney (#32)
- Umpire: Tommy Hensley (#19)
- Head linesman: Sid Semon (#109)
- Line judge: Boyce Smith (#3)
- Back judge: Jim Kearney (#107)
- Side judge: Bill Quinby (#58)
- Field judge: Ron Spitler (#119)
