= Cowboys–Eagles rivalry =

National Football League rivalry

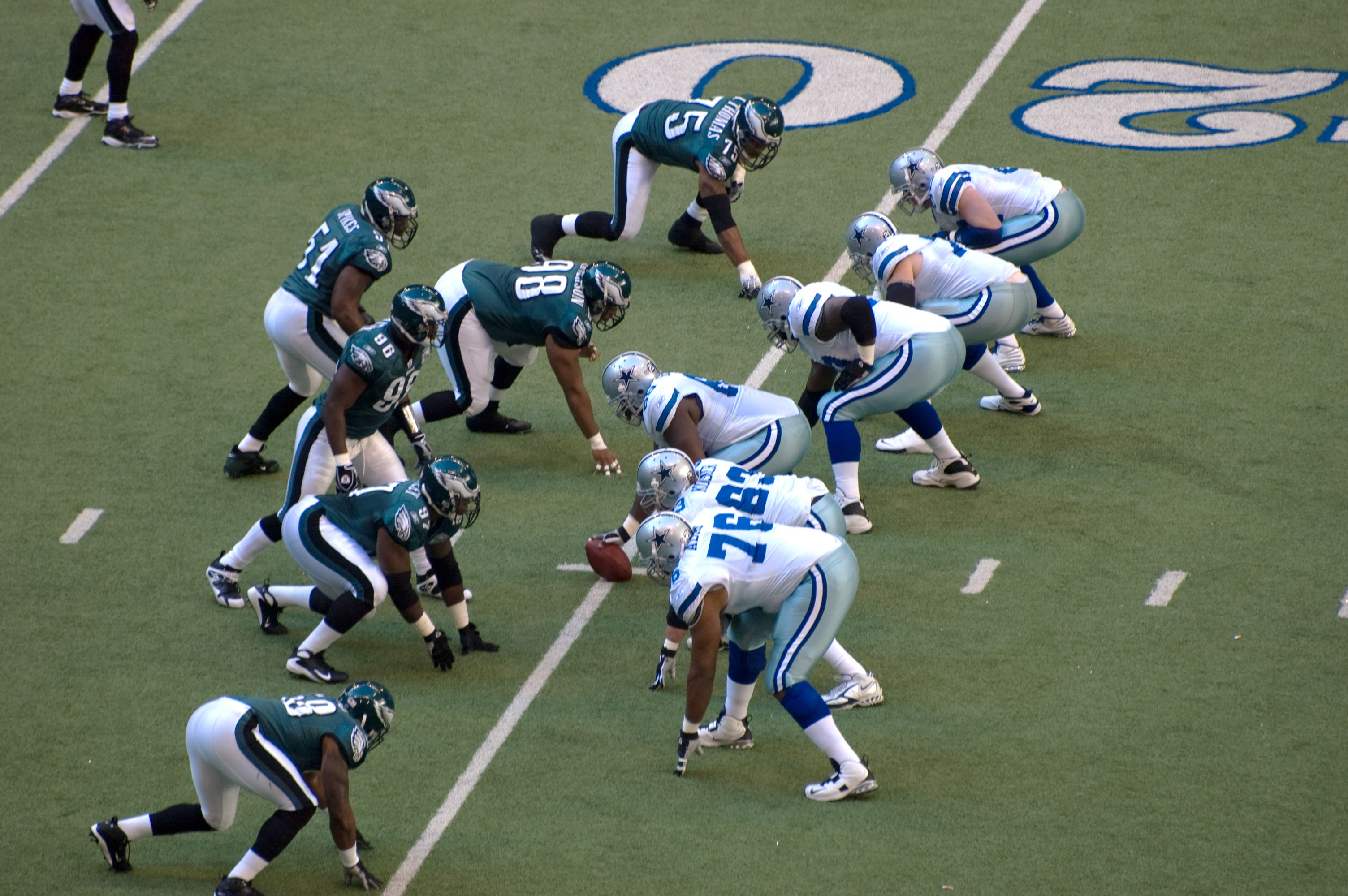
- The Cowboys and Eagles facing off during the 2007 season.

- Dallas Cowboys Philadelphia Eagles
- Location: Dallas, Philadelphia
- First meeting: September 30, 1960; Eagles 27, Cowboys 25
- Latest meeting: October 26, 2026; Cowboys 38, Eagles 21
- Next meeting: November 26, 2026
- Stadiums: Cowboys: AT&T Stadium; Eagles: Lincoln Financial Field

Statistics
- Total meetings: 135
- All-time series: Cowboys: 76–59
- Regular season series: Cowboys: 73–58
- Postseason results: Cowboys: 3–1
- Largest victory: Cowboys: 56–7 (1966); Eagles: 44–6 (2008)
- Most points scored: Cowboys: 56 (1966); Eagles: 49 (2004)
- Longest win streak: Cowboys: 11 (1967–1972); Eagles: 8 (1987–1991)
- Current win streak: Cowboys: 2 (2025–present)

Post-season history
- 1980 NFC Championship: Eagles won: 20–7; 1992 NFC Divisional: Cowboys won: 34–10; 1995 NFC Divisional: Cowboys won: 30–11; 2009 NFC Wild Card: Cowboys won: 34–14

The Cowboys–Eagles rivalry is a National Football League (NFL) rivalry between the Dallas Cowboys and Philadelphia Eagles.

The Cowboys joined the NFL as an expansion team in 1960 season and were placed in the NFL Western Conference, where they faced the Eagles for the first time. In 1961, Dallas was moved to the NFL Eastern Conference, resulting in two annual meetings with Philadelphia. Following the AFL–NFL merger in 1970, both teams were placed in the NFC East, where they have remained divisional opponents. During the 1970s, the Cowboys held a significant advantage in the series, compiling a 17–3 record against the Eagles and establishing a substantial lead in the overall rivalry.

The rivalry has been filled with bitterly contested games that are typical of the NFC East. The matchups have been the most frequently featured on NBC Sunday Night Football with a total of 16.

The Cowboys lead the overall series, 76–59. The two teams have met four times in the playoffs, with the Cowboys holding a 3–1 record.

== Notable moments ==
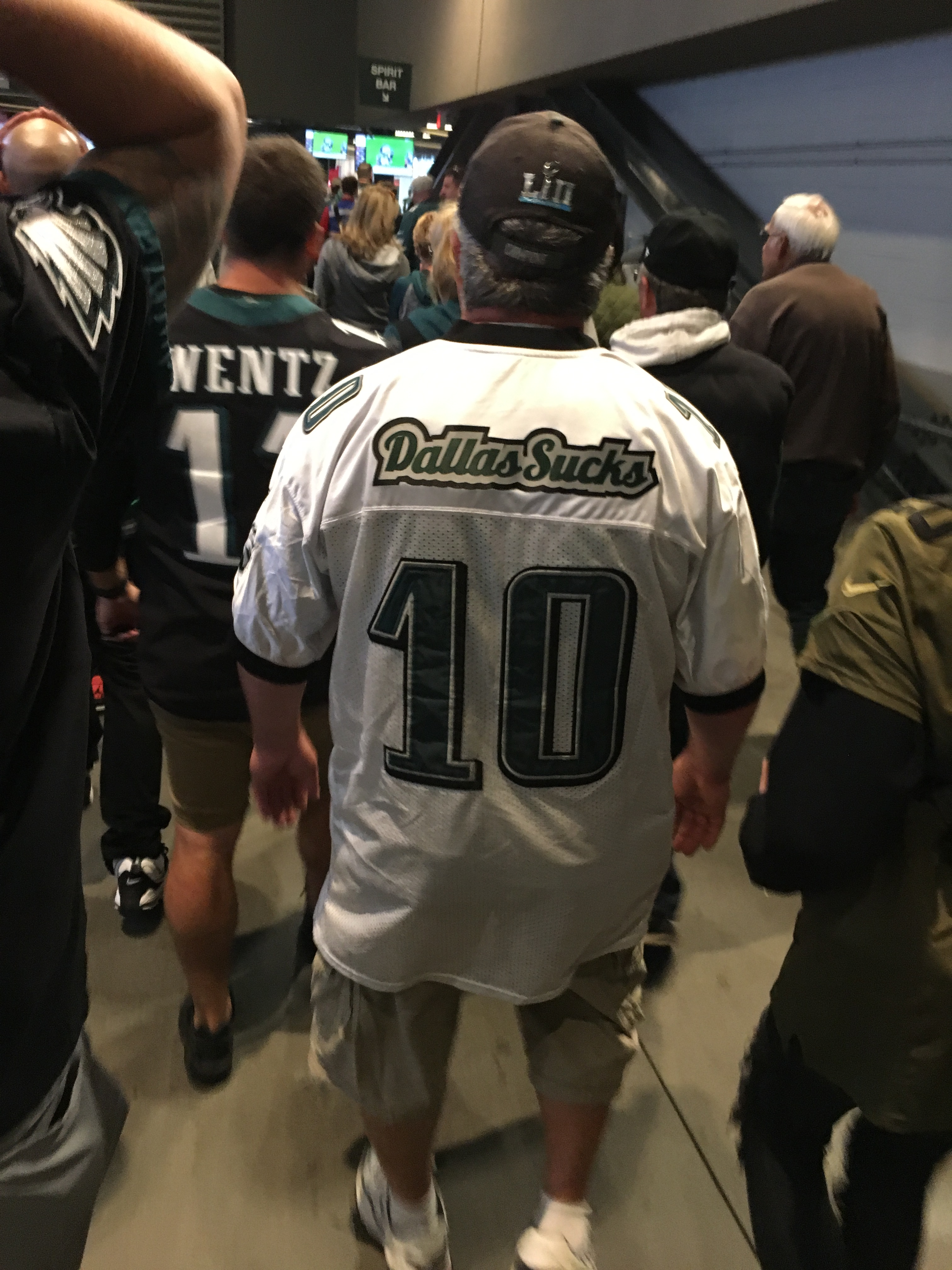
A customized DeSean Jackson jersey being worn by an Eagles fan, with "Dallas sucks" instead in the nameplate area, at a 2019 home game at Lincoln Financial Field.

- On November 12, 1979, Tony Franklin kicked what was then the longest field goal in Eagles history, 59 yards, to help the Eagles win their first-ever game at Texas Stadium, 31–21 (the kick has since been bettered by Jake Elliott's 61-yard kick in 2017). The Eagles were on a three-game losing streak when they went to Dallas for the Monday Night Football game and things did not look promising when quarterback Ron Jaworski was knocked out, but back-up John Walton threw a touchdown pass to Charlie Smith and Franklin kicked the long field goal that Landry said took the juice out right before the half.
- 1980 NFC Championship Game, January 11, 1981 – After losing to the Cowboys in all but 3 games from 1967 to 1979, the Eagles finished first in the NFC East in 1980 due to tie-breaking procedures (both teams 12–4 and splitting the meetings between each other, but the Eagles scored more points) and claimed the division, missed out on the #1 seed in the NFC (the latter proved inconsequential due to seeding restrictions and Dallas defeating Atlanta). Following 14-point deficits overcome by both teams in their respective Divisional playoff victories lead up to the 1980 NFC Championship Game, which was also called the "Blue Jersey Game", on the account that the Eagles, having the choice as the home team, made the Cowboys wear their seemingly cursed blue jerseys (a stigma that dated back to Super Bowl V). To the cheers of a roaring Veterans Stadium crowd, the Eagles defeated the Cowboys 20–7.
- The 1987 NFL season – With many of the Cowboys players crossing the picket line during the strike, Dallas humiliated the replacement-laden Eagles 41–22. Buddy Ryan accused Tom Landry of running up the score (something Buddy Ryan had accused him of before), and Ryan had his heart set on revenge. With little time remaining and the Eagles up by ten, Randall Cunningham faked a kneel down and tossed a long pass into the end zone, resulting in a pass interference call. With the Eagles at the one, a final touchdown made the score 37–20.
- The Bounty Bowls (I and II) and – The two 1989 meetings were nicknamed the Bounty Bowls, due to the accusation by Cowboys head coach Jimmy Johnson that the Eagles had set a bounty on Dallas players, particularly quarterback Troy Aikman and kicker Luis Zendejas. In the second game at Veterans Stadium, Eagles fans threw snowballs, ice, and beer onto the field. Several game participants were targeted, including back judge Al Jury and Cowboys punter Mike Saxon (both struck by snowballs), as well as Cowboys head coach Jimmy Johnson, who was hit with objects as he was escorted off the field by the Philadelphia Police Department. The Eagles won both Bounty Bowl games; 27–0 at Texas Stadium in Irving, Texas and 20–10 in Philadelphia.
- In October 1990, the Eagles and Cowboys met for what became known as the "Porkchop Bowl". The week before game day at Texas Stadium in Irving, Texas, Philadelphia head coach Buddy Ryan and Ted Plumb, his offensive coordinator were out for dinner. Ryan was dining on pork chops and started to choke. Plumb quickly initiated the Heimlich maneuver and saved Ryan's life. Word of the incident spread at Texas Stadium in Irving, Texas, and hatred by Cowboys fans was so fevered towards Ryan that former Cowboys' president Tex Schramm dubbed the pending game on October 28 the "Porkchop Bowl." When the game began, Cowboys fans tossed pork chops and similar simulated meat products from the stands toward the Eagles bench. The Eagles would win this game 21–20.
- 1991 regular season – The Eagles began the 1991 season by defeating the Cowboys 24–0 at Texas Stadium in Irving, Texas in week 3. During that game, the Eagles set a record with 11 sacks of Cowboys quarterback Troy Aikman. Meanwhile, riding a three-game winning streak, Dallas entered Veterans Stadium in week 16 with a chance at a playoff berth. The Cowboys benefited from Eagles quarterback Randall Cunningham being injured and rode a Kelvin Martin punt return for a touchdown to a 25–13 victory. The loss eliminated the Eagles from the playoff picture.
- 1992–1995 – The Eagles started the 1992 season 5–0 and met the undefeated Cowboys on Monday Night Football. En route to a 31–7 win, the Eagles' number one-ranked defense held the Cowboys' offense to one first-quarter touchdown. However, later that year, Dallas ousted Philadelphia from the divisional round in a 34–10 rout at Texas Stadium. Three years later, the Cowboys bounced the Eagles from the divisional round of the playoffs a second time, winning 30–11. Dallas eventually advanced to, and won, the Super Bowl in both seasons. The Cowboys' win over the Eagles in the 1995 NFC Divisional playoffs currently marks Dallas' last appearances in both the NFC Championship Game and the Super Bowl.
- October 31, 1993: In the middle of a rainstorm on Halloween, Emmitt Smith ran for 237 yards; setting a Cowboys record for most yards by a running back in a single game as the Cowboys won 23–10.
- In November 1996, with the Eagles leading at 24–21, James Willis made a memorable play in what was a relatively unmemorable career as an Eagles linebacker when he intercepted a Troy Aikman pass in the end zone and lateraled the ball to Troy Vincent who took it the distance to complete a 104-yard touchdown. The Eagles would go on to win 31–21.
- Trailing by one point, the Eagles were a short field goal on the last play of the game from defeating the Cowboys at Texas Stadium on September 15, 1997. Punter Tom Hutton could not handle the snap for kicker Chris Boniol and, after a brief scramble, was tackled by the Dallas defense to secure a 21–20 Cowboys victory.
- On October 10, 1999, Dallas wide receiver Michael Irvin suffered a career-ending spinal cord injury while playing at Veterans Stadium. The crowd cheered when Irvin did not get up and chanted "Deion sucks" when Irvin's teammate, Deion Sanders, consoled him. The Cowboys went on to lose the game, 13–10.
- In September 2000, the Eagles and Cowboys met in what would later become known as the "Pickle Juice" game. With temperatures at 109+ degrees, the Eagles pulled their players off the field and had the players drink pickle juice to prevent cramping, a practice the club had begun during training camp as a means to combat both dehydration and cramping. The experiment proved to be a success as the Eagles handed the Cowboys their worst opening day loss since 1963: defeating them by a score of 41–14.
- In September 2002, during their final home opener at Veterans Stadium, the Eagles overcame a slow start and blasted the Dallas Cowboys 44–13. The defense collected four turnovers and sacked Quincy Carter four times. This marked the highest point total for an Eagles team that would finish the season with 415 points: the most they've ever scored in franchise history.
- October 12, 2003: In week 6 of the 2003 season, the 2–2 Eagles met the 3–1 Cowboys and fell to them 23–21; their first loss to the Cowboys since 1999. One of the most notable moments during that game occurred during the opening kickoff. Andy Reid had tried an onside kick to start the game; however, Cowboys head coach Bill Parcells, was not fooled and the gamble blew up in Philadelphia's face. Randal Williams fielded the bouncing kick and raced into the end zone untouched in three seconds – the fastest touchdown in NFL history.
- December 2003: In their first meeting at Lincoln Financial Field, the Eagles crushed the Bill Parcells-led Cowboys 36–10. The Eagles defense held the Cowboys to 150 yards rushing, collected 3 sacks of quarterback Quincy Carter, forced two interceptions and a safety.
- November 15, 2004: In a Monday Night Football game that is probably more remembered for a controversial pre-game promotion featuring Terrell Owens and Desperate Housewives actress Nicollette Sheridan, the Eagles throttled the Cowboys in Texas Stadium, 49–21. In addition, Eagles quarterback Donovan McNabb redefined pocket presence by eluding Cowboys defenders for 14 seconds on one notable play before launching a 60-yard pass to Freddie Mitchell. At the time, this was the highest scoring game in the Eagles-Cowboys rivalry and was the highest point total ever for a visiting team at Texas Stadium.
- 5 weeks later, on December 19, 2004; the Eagles and Cowboys met again in a defensive struggle in which an Eagles' victory would clinch home field advantage. The Eagles won 12–7, and finished this season at 13–3, their best season in franchise history at the time. Unfortunately, this game also turned sour in the third quarter when Roy Williams made a horse-collar tackle on Terrell Owens, breaking his ankle. He was later ruled out until Super Bowl XXXIX.
- In week 5 of the 2005 season, quarterback Drew Bledsoe needed only four plays to lead the Cowboys to a touchdown to open the game. The Eagles defense made a nice goal-line stand on the Cowboys' next possession, but when Dallas got the ball back, Bledsoe connected with Terry Glenn for a 38-yard score, Glenn's second touchdown. A José Cortéz field goal left the Eagles in another 17–0 hole. Donovan McNabb and the Eagles managed a field goal on their first drive of the second quarter, but there would be no comeback this week. Bledsoe tossed another touchdown pass, this one to Lousaka Polite, making it 24–3 Dallas. Bledsoe led the Cowboys to field-goal drives to end the half and to start the third quarter, leaving the Eagles behind 30–3. The only bright moment of the game for Philadelphia was Lito Sheppard stripping receiver Keyshawn Johnson of the ball in the third quarter and Sheldon Brown recovering and racing 80 yards for the touchdown, Brown's second defensive touchdown in as many weeks. The Eagles were held to a paltry 129 offensive yards in the embarrassing 33–10 loss and their pass defense was mauled by Bledsoe. Even worse was to come for the Eagles five weeks later.
- In week 10 of the 2005 season, the Eagles welcomed the Cowboys to Lincoln Financial Field needing a win to keep any playoff hopes alive. They limped into this game 4–4, and had already lost to the Cowboys 33–10 in week 5. In addition, two weeks prior to this game, the Eagles dismissed Terrell Owens due to inappropriate comments he made about Donovan McNabb and the organization following their loss to the Denver Broncos. The Eagles appeared to be in control, as they held a 20–7 lead late in the game following 2 rushing touchdowns from Brian Westbrook and Donovan McNabb. But with 4 minutes to go in the 4th quarter, the Cowboys scored on a Drew Bledsoe to Terry Glenn touchdown to cut the lead to 20–14. And with less than 3 minutes to go, then came the nail in the coffin, as Donovan McNabb threw an interception to Roy Williams who returned the ball 45 yards for a touchdown and a 21–20 lead. To make matters worse, the Eagles quarterback re-injured his sports hernia attempting to make the tackle. Backup Mike McMahon came in and got the Eagles into Dallas territory, but a go-ahead 60-yard kick from David Akers failed. The Eagles would later finish the season 6–10; while the Cowboys would finish 9–7. Furthermore, the Eagles became the first team in NFL history to be swept by all of their divisional opponents after sweeping them in the prior season.
- On October 8, 2006, wide receiver Terrell Owens, who had previously played for the Eagles, played his first game in Philadelphia as a Cowboy. The Eagles won 38–24 with a late interception return for a touchdown by Lito Sheppard. Owens was held to 3 catches and 45 yards.
- On Christmas Day 2006, an amazing December turnaround of the Philadelphia Eagles continued with another road win over their division rival. Philadelphia's surprising 23–7 victory over the Dallas Cowboys not only clinched a playoff spot, but seized control of the NFC East due to their head-to-head tiebreaker over the Cowboys after Dallas squandered their chance to clinch the NFC East themselves and lost any chance of gaining a first-round bye. The following week, a Dallas loss to the Detroit Lions gave the Eagles the NFC East title just minutes into their regular-season finale against the Atlanta Falcons.

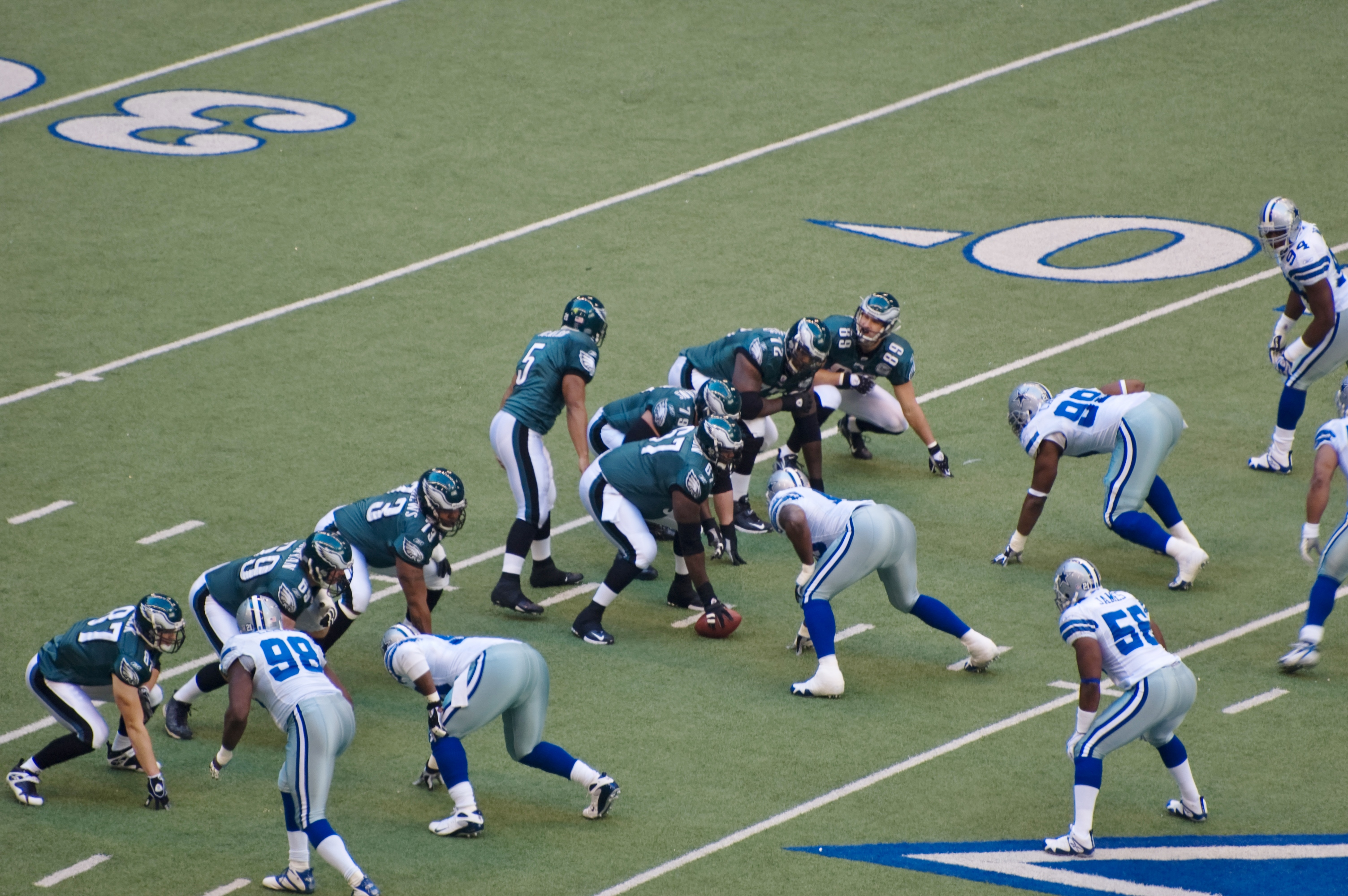
Pre-snap activity during a Cowboys–Eagles game in 2007

- In week 9 of the 2007 season, the division-leading Cowboys handed the Eagles a decisive 38–17 loss on NBC Sunday Night Football in Philadelphia. One of the most memorable moments of the game was tight end Jason Witten making a 53-yard reception after losing his helmet.
- In week 15 of the 2007 season, with less than 30 seconds left in the game and the Eagles leading 10–6, running back Brian Westbrook, had a 24-yard untouched run for a touchdown, but stopped just short of the end zone and took a knee at the 1-yard line. Quarterback Donovan McNabb took three knees to seal the victory.
- In week 2 of the 2008 season, the Eagles and Cowboys met in the final Monday Night Football game at Texas Stadium. When the dust settled, the game featured the second-most first-half points in MNF history (54) and most combined points in the rivalry's history (78). The Cowboys beat the Eagles 41–37 in a game that featured 7 lead changes.
- On December 28, 2008, in week 17 of the 2008 season, the Eagles and Cowboys faced off in Philadelphia with a wild card playoff berth on the line. The winner would claim the sixth and final wild card spot in the NFC, and the loser would be eliminated from playoff contention. This situation was brought about by losses earlier in the day by the Tampa Bay Buccaneers and the Chicago Bears, which kept the Eagles' playoff hopes alive. The Eagles did not squander the opportunity and took a 27–3 halftime lead on their way to a 44–6 blowout of the Cowboys. It was Terrell Owens's last game as a Cowboy.
- In week 9 of the 2009 NFL season, the Eagles and Cowboys met for their 100th game at Lincoln Financial Field. Both teams came into this game 5–2 and looking to take control of the NFC East. The game was hard-fought; with the Cowboys holding a 10–6 lead by halftime only for the Eagles to go up 13–10 in the 3rd quarter. But with just under 8 minutes to go, quarterback Tony Romo threw a 49-yard touchdown pass to Miles Austin midway through the fourth quarter and the Dallas Cowboys held on to beat the Eagles 20–16.
- On January 3, 2010, in week 17 of the 2009 season, the Cowboys (10–5) hosted their regular season finale against the Eagles (11–4) in a regular season-sealing claim for the NFC East crown. The Cowboys would win the day, shutting out the Eagles, 24–0. With the victory, the Cowboys would once again reclaim first place in their division and improve to 11–5. The loss dropped the Eagles from being the #2 seed and having a first-round bye, all the way down to the #6 seed, while the Cowboys earned the #3 seed, setting the stage for a rematch in the Wild Card playoffs once again at AT&T Stadium in Arlington, Texas. For the third time that year, the Cowboys defeated the Eagles, with a final score of 34–14. The Cowboys and Eagles combined to set an NFL record for the most penalty yards in a playoff game, ever. The two teams were penalized 23 times for 228 yards. This was the last game with the Eagles for quarterback Donovan McNabb, who was traded to the Washington Redskins in the offseason.
- In December 2010, the Eagles defeated the Cowboys in a wild 30–27 win. Philadelphia delivered the game's opening strike with a 1-yard touchdown run from quarterback Michael Vick, but the Cowboys answered with quarterback Jon Kitna completing a 1-yard touchdown pass to tight end Jason Witten. The Eagles regained the lead in the second quarter with Vick locating offensive guard Todd Herremans on a 1-yard touchdown pass. Afterwards, Dallas closed out the half with kicker David Buehler making a 50-yard field goal. The Cowboys took the lead in the third quarter as Buehler got a 43-yard field goal, followed by running back Felix Jones getting a 3-yard touchdown run. Philadelphia struck back with a 39-yard field goal from kicker David Akers. The Eagles tied the game with a 50-yard field goal from Akers, followed by Vick connecting with wide receiver DeSean Jackson on a 91-yard touchdown pass and Akers' 28-yard field goal. Dallas tried to rally as Kitna completed a 22-yard touchdown pass to Witten, yet the Eagles held on for the victory.
- In week 10 of the 2012 season (November 11), the Eagles and Cowboys met in what turned out to be an ugly affair for the Eagles. Going into this game, both teams came in with losing records of 3–5 which marked the first time in 22 years both teams met with records that were sub .500. They scored first with Michael Vick hooking up with Riley Cooper on a 2-yard touchdown pass for a 7–0 lead, however, the Cowboys responded with Tony Romo finding Felix Jones on an 11-yard pass for a 7–7 lead. Then increased their lead in the 2nd quarter as Dan Bailey kicked a 30-yard field goal for a 10–7 halftime lead. Michael Vick had been knocked out of the game and was possibly out for the season after going 6/9 for 70 yards and a touchdown pass. Rookie quarterback Nick Foles would get his first NFL action and threw his first touchdown pass to Jeremy Maclin from 44 yards out as the Eagles retook a 14–10 lead while Henery moved the team ahead 17–10 with a 40-yard field goal. After this, the Cowboys went back to work as Romo found Dez Bryant on a 30-yard touchdown pass to tie the game at 17–17. Then the Cowboys retook the lead with Dwayne Harris returned a punt 78-yards for a touchdown for a 24–17 lead followed up by Brandon Carr returning an interception 47 yards for a touchdown and a 31–17 lead. The Eagles then got back to work with Stanley Havili 1-yard touchdown run (with a failed extra point) to shorten the lead to 31–23. But the Cowboys wrapped the game up with Jason Hatcher's fumble recovery in the end zone for a final score of 38–23 in Dallas' favor.
- In week 13 of the 2012 season (December 2), the Eagles limped into their second meeting with the Cowboys with a record of 3–8 and looking to keep any hopes of playoff aspirations alive. Unfortunately, a 38–33 loss to the Cowboys secured the Eagles their third losing season since 1999 and their first since 2005. Thus this season became their third losing season under Andy Reid as the Eagles were swept by the Cowboys for the first time since 2009. Also with the loss, the Eagles were mathematically eliminated from playoff contention. The Eagles fired Reid as head coach after the season.
- On October 20, 2013, the Eagles and Cowboys met for the first time under new Eagles head coach Chip Kelly at Lincoln Financial Field. In an unexpected defensive tussle, a banged-up defense shut down Kelly's prolific offense and the Cowboys overcame a sluggish start to beat the Philadelphia Eagles 17–3 to take sole possession of first place in the NFC East.
- On December 29, 2013, in week 17 of the 2013 season, the Eagles and Cowboys faced off at AT&T Stadium in Arlington, Texas for the de facto NFC East Championship. The winner would thus claim the third seed in the NFC and the loser would be eliminated from playoff contention. The Eagles won 24–22 on an interception by Brandon Boykin with the Kyle Orton pass intended for Miles Austin. This sealed the victory with 1:43 remaining in the game. Tony Romo missed the game after being injured the previous week. The Eagles handed the Cowboys their third straight week 17 winner-take-all NFC East title game loss and third straight 8–8 season in as many years having lost to all three division rivals across 2011–2013.
- On December 14, 2014, the Cowboys met the Eagles on NBC Sunday Night Football with both teams at 9–4. The Cowboys took a 21–0 lead early in the 2nd quarter, but the Eagles would score 24 straight points capped off by a Darren Sproles 1-yard run to take a 24–21 lead with 5 minutes left in the third quarter. The Cowboys would however re-take control and win 38–27 to split the season series and take possession of the NFC East lead for the first time in the season. The Eagles, who controlled the division for the entire season, were eliminated from playoff contention the next week.
- On March 12, 2015, former Cowboys running back and reigning NFL rushing champion DeMarco Murray signed with the Eagles. This enraged some Cowboys fans, calling Murray a "traitor". The Cowboys and Eagles met for the first time in 2015 on September 20 (week 2) in Philadelphia. Murray was held to 2 rushing yards on 13 carries. Additionally, the Cowboys would go on to win 20–10; but after Tony Romo was knocked out of the game with a broken collarbone by Eagles rookie linebacker Jordan Hicks, which would keep him out of action for weeks to come.
- On November 8, 2015, the Eagles and Cowboys met at AT&T Stadium in Arlington, Texas. Dallas while riding a 5-game losing streak, was still feeling the effects of injured quarterback Tony Romo from the week 2 game in Philadelphia and the loss of the now Eagles running back DeMarco Murray in the offseason. Philadelphia came in with an underwhelming (3–4) record with questions about their offensive scheme and the direction of head coach Chip Kelly's personnel moves. However, both teams would still find themselves in the thick of the NFC East race with a win, mainly due to the fact that the New York Giants were only 4–4 at the time. Many expected a low scoring defensive battle but that was clearly not the case as the Eagles would win in overtime over the Cowboys 33–27. This quickly became a wild game at AT&T Stadium in Arlington, Texas that featured back and forth action between the two teams with their seasons on the line. It would come down to overtime when Sam Bradford threw a touchdown pass to wide receiver Jordan Matthews to seal the Eagles victory. It was the third-straight season split between the two, the third straight time the road team won both games, and the twelfth straight year the road team won at least once in the series.
- On October 30, 2016, the Eagles and Cowboys faced off in a battle of rookie quarterbacks between Carson Wentz and Dak Prescott. Thanks to a fourth quarter rally by Dak Prescott, the Cowboys were able to tie the Eagles at 23–23, sending the game into overtime. Despite a rough start, Prescott finished the game with 287 yards with two touchdowns, including a 5-yard pass to tight end Jason Witten that allowed the Cowboys to defeat the Eagles with a final score of 29–23.
- During the 2017 NFL Draft held in Philadelphia, Drew Pearson trolled the loudly booing local audience by saying "I want to thank the Eagles fans for allowing me to have a career in the NFL!" He pumped his fist as he screamed that he was representing the "five-time Super Bowl champion Dallas Cowboys and Hall of Fame owner Jerry Jones!"
- During the 2018 NFL Draft held at AT&T Stadium, David Akers trolled the loudly booing local audience and one-upped Pearson's jab from the previous year by first saying "What's up, Dallas? We heard you in Philly last year!" and then adding "Tonight! I'm representing the Philadelphia Eagles! NFC East Champs! Divisional Champs! NFC Champs! AND WORLD CHAMPS! THE WORLD CHAMPS! Hey Dallas, the last time you were in the Super Bowl these draft picks weren't born!" before drafting a tight end coincidentally named Dallas Goedert, which the Eagles took away from the Cowboys following the retirement of Cowboys tight end Jason Witten and the Eagles moving up one spot in the draft from 50th overall to 49th overall.
- On December 9, 2018; the Eagles and Cowboys met for their second meeting of the 2018 season. The Cowboys came in on a 4-game winning streak at 7–5 and the struggling Eagles rolled in with a 6–6 record. With the help of three go-ahead touchdowns by Amari Cooper, 455 passing yards from Dak Prescott, and 192 scrimmage yards from Ezekiel Elliott, the Dallas Cowboys won 29–23 in an overtime thriller. As a result, the Cowboys swept the season series over the Eagles, and took a 2-game lead in the division over the Philadelphia Eagles and Washington Redskins after this victory. However, the officiating was scrutinized for numerous bad calls for both teams. On the very first play of the game, the Eagles had attempted an unsuccessful challenge from Doug Pederson for a kickoff fumble that was ultimately not declared a recovery. Second, Ezekiel Elliott drew a never-before called 15-yard helmet-lowering penalty for the hit he put on Eagles safety Corey Graham albeit getting shoved by an Eagles defender. Third, a touchdown courtesy of rookie tight end Dallas Goedert in the third quarter that was overturned thanks to offensive pass interference after he seemed to run into Jeff Heath before catching the ball. Fox Sports analyst and former Vice President of NFL Officiating Mike Pereira noted the hit was within 5 yards of the line of scrimmage and should not have been called. Lastly, Pereira also lambasted a roughing the passer penalty on Randy Gregory during a clear sack of Carson Wentz. In total, the Philadelphia Eagles committed 5 penalties for 49 yards while the Cowboys were called for 11 penalties for 111 yards. Dallas would go on to win the division, while Philadelphia would rebound from the tough loss by winning their final three games to sneak into the playoffs.
- On October 20, 2019; the Eagles and Cowboys met with identical records of 3–3 looking to take control of the NFC East. Both teams each came off losses the week prior. The Cowboys defeated the Eagles, 37–10. The Cowboys defense forced fumbles on the Eagles' first two drives that the offense turned into two touchdowns, including a strip-sack by DeMarcus Lawrence, which was his first sack against the Eagles in his career. From that point on, the Cowboys never looked back. Later, in a span of three plays in the fourth quarter, both Xavier Woods and Jalen Mills each intercepted passes and Kerry Hyder recovered a fumble from Eagles quarterback Carson Wentz. All told, Carson Wentz had three turnovers – two fumbles and an interception. He finished 16-of-26 for 191 yards with a touchdown as well for an 80.8 quarterback rating. Meanwhile, Dak Prescott finished the game 21-of-27 for 239 yards with a touchdown and an interception for a quarterback rating of 100.5. He put an exclamation point on the night with an 8-yard touchdown run in the fourth quarter.
- On December 22, 2019, at Lincoln Financial Field, an injury-ravaged Eagles team defeated the Cowboys 17–9, avenging their week 7 loss at AT&T Stadium in Arlington, Texas and taking the lead in the NFC East for the first time all season. This defensive duel was sealed late in the 4th quarter when Eagles cornerback Sidney Jones broke up a fourth-down pass intended for Michael Gallup. The victory improved Philadelphia to 8–7. The Eagles would go on to win the division the following week against the New York Giants, eliminating the Cowboys. At the conclusion of the season, the Cowboys chose not to renew head coach Jason Garrett's contract.
- On November 1, 2020, their first meeting of the 2020 season, Wentz and the Eagles bumbled their way to a crucial division win over an injury-ravaged Dallas Cowboys team led by rookie quarterback Ben DiNucci. The Cowboys opened the scoring on the game's opening drive with a 49-yard field goal by Greg Zuerlein. After a fumble by Wentz gave the Cowboys the ball back, the Eagles regained possession on a DiNucci fumble and took a 7–3 lead on Jalen Reagor's first career touchdown reception. The Cowboys responded with another Zuerlein field goal following Wentz's second fumble and took a 9–7 halftime lead on a 59-yard field goal. On the Eagles' second-half opening drive, Wentz would be picked off by Cowboys rookie cornerback Trevon Diggs, who returned the ball to the Dallas 31, but the Cowboys failed to capitalize when Zuerlein's ensuing 52-yard field goal attempt sailed wide right. The Eagles used the momentum swing to regain the lead 15–9 on a 9-yard Travis Fulgham touchdown reception. In the fourth quarter, T. J. Edwards strip-sacked DiNucci, and the ensuing fumble was recovered and returned 53 yards for a touchdown by Rodney McLeod. With the 23–9 win, Philadelphia improved to 3–4–1 on the season heading into their week 9 bye, while Dallas dropped to 2-6 ahead of a big matchup against the undefeated Pittsburgh Steelers.
- The rivals met again at AT&T Stadium on December 27, 2020. The Eagles would dominate the Cowboys in the first quarter, jumping out to a 14–3 lead with touchdowns on each of its first two possessions, including an 81-yard touchdown by DeSean Jackson, his only score of the season. However, Dallas' offense would quickly turn the tables and outscore Philadelphia 34–3 over the final three quarters. A second-quarter stinger injury to Fletcher Cox would prove costly to the Eagles' defense, which allowed 513 total yards on the afternoon. Jalen Hurts turned the ball over three times, one of which led to a Cowboys scoring drive. The Cowboys won the game 37–17 to improve to 6–9 on the season and eliminate the Eagles, who dropped to 4–10–1 with the loss, from playoff contention. This was Dallas' 40th home win and 70th overall win over Philadelphia in the rivalry, including the postseason.
- During the 2021 NFL draft, in a rare collaborative move, the Eagles traded a third-round pick and their 12th overall pick for Dallas's 10th overall pick. The purpose of this trade for the Eagles was to select Heisman Trophy-winning wide receiver DeVonta Smith ahead of fellow divisional rivals, the New York Giants, who were sitting in the 11th spot. This move reportedly made the Giants front office "livid".
- In the week before the clubs' September 27, 2021 Monday Night Football matchup at AT&T Stadium in Arlington, Texas, new Eagles head coach Nick Sirianni wore a T-shirt with the words "Beat Dallas" to a mid-week press conference. When asked about the shirt, he stated, "I can't tell you how many times since I've been here having an interaction with a fan, it's, like, 'Hey, beat Dallas.' And I think that's really cool. I think that's awesome. So really love the fact that I'm able to partake in this rivalry. The bulletin board material sparked the Cowboys to decimate the visiting Eagles 41–21 in a very one-sided game. After the game, the Dallas Cowboys media team uploaded a photoshopped image of Nick Sirianni's shirt with the edit of "Beat by Dallas." on the team's Twitter account.
- With both teams clinching a playoff spot, their week 18 season finale on January 8, 2022, was meaningless in terms of their standings in the playoffs. Still, the Cowboys finished off their season sweep of the NFC East by beating the Eagles 51–26 in a "Scorigami.”
- In a week 6 NBC Sunday Night Football matchup in 2022 to determine first place in the division, the Eagles continued their unbeaten streak, outlasting the Cowboys 26–17 and handing Dallas backup quarterback Cooper Rush his first loss as a starter in the NFL. In the game's closing seconds, Dallas defensive lineman Osa Odighizuwa responded to getting blocked by Eagles center Jason Kelce after the whistle by tackling him, drawing a penalty for unnecessary roughness and essentially ending the game. Eagles head coach Nick Sirianni was furious and was clearly seen pointing and yelling ‘F*** you!’ — and he wasn't done there. While walking down the tunnel towards the locker room at the Lincoln Financial Field, Sirianni approached a camera and mocked the Cowboys' cheer by shouting, ‘How ‘bout them Eagles?
- In a week 16 Christmas Eve game in 2022, the Eagles traveled to Dallas for an opportunity to clinch the #1 seed in the NFC for the first time since 2017 and their first division title since 2019. Backup quarterback Gardner Minshew started the Eagles' road finale against the arch-rival Cowboys in place of Jalen Hurts, who was sitting out due to the shoulder injury he sustained the prior week against Chicago. Despite a solid performance by Minshew, Philadelphia was doomed by a season-high four turnovers, all of which led to scoring drives for Dallas, in what turned out to be a high-scoring slugfest. Trailing 40–34 late in the game, Minshew attempted to lead the Eagles on a go-ahead drive into Cowboys territory, but a fourth-down pass would fall incomplete, denying Philadelphia a perfect away record.
- In week 9 of the 2023 NFL season, the two teams met at Lincoln Financial Field in a highly anticipated matchup. Philadelphia entered the game leading the division and conference with a 7–1 record, while Dallas entered the game with a 5–2 record. A Dallas win would have cut the Eagles' division lead to a half game, but the Eagles won the game by a final score of 28–23. Late in the third quarter, Philadelphia extended their lead to eleven points on a short touchdown pass from quarterback Jalen Hurts to star wide receiver A. J. Brown. At that point, Dallas's defense would clamp down and not allow another point, but their offense failed to capitalize on several opportunities deep in Philadelphia territory, ultimately costing them the important game. After the aforementioned touchdown reception by Brown, Dallas put together a long drive but faced a fourth-and-goal at Philadelphia's 1-yard line. Head coach Mike McCarthy elected to go for the touchdown, and a pass from Prescott to rookie reserve tight end Luke Schoonmaker was initially ruled a touchdown, but replays showed that Schoonmaker was touched down by contact before the ball crossed the plane of the goal line, thus rewarding Philadelphia possession on a turnover on downs. After the Eagles went three-and-out, Dallas cashed in on their next drive for a touchdown. However, on the ensuing two-point attempt (which would have cut the Eagles' lead to three points if successful), Prescott scrambled for the end zone, but stepped out of bounds before the ball broke the plane, thus meaning that the attempt was no good. This failed two-point attempt would be extremely consequential on Dallas's next two drives. After Philadelphia went three-and-out again, Dallas advanced the ball to Philly's 29-yard line with all three timeouts and 1:22 remaining in the game, but they faced a fourth-and-eight. Instead of having the option to kick a tying-field goal, Dallas had no choice but to try the fourth down attempt, which failed. Despite the turnover on downs, the Eagles still had to convert a first down to end the game. On third down, running back D'Andre Swift fumbled after colliding with Brown, but the Eagles managed to recover the ball and punt the ball on fourth down to the opposing 14-yard line with 46 seconds remaining. With seemingly little hope left, Dallas managed to advance the ball all the way to the Eagles' 6-yard-line with time to spare after a couple of big gains, a trio of defensive penalties, and injuries to Philadelphia cornerbacks Darius Slay and James Bradberry. However, a pair of pre-snap offensive penalties and a huge sack by edge rusher Josh Sweat backed Dallas up to the Philadelphia 27-yard line. With three seconds left and Dallas needing a touchdown for the win, Prescott fired a laser over the middle to star wide receiver CeeDee Lamb, who caught the ball at the 3-yard line but was stripped before he could reach the end zone, thus ending the game. With the huge victory, Philadelphia improved to 8–1 and fortified their stronghold on the division, while Dallas fell to 5–3 with the crushing defeat. After the game, Philadelphia tight end Dallas Goedert was asked about his thoughts on Eagles fans chanting "Dallas sucks" throughout the game. Goedert responded, "Rookie year, I was a little worried that they might have been talking to me, but not anymore! I'm a Philly guy. And I love the hatred we have towards Dallas. So hearing 'Dallas sucks' just gets me fired up because I feel the same way about it."
- The Eagles and Cowboys met to kickoff the 2025 NFL season as the NFL Kickoff game, hosted in Philadelphia after the Eagles won Super Bowl LIX the season prior. Six seconds into the game, defensive tackle Jalen Carter was ejected for spitting on Dak Prescott, drawing an unsportsmanlike conduct penalty that resulted in disqualification. The game also featured a thunderstorm delay that stopped play for 65 minutes, with the Eagles emerging victorious 24–20.
- In week 12 of the 2025 NFL season, the Eagles took on the Dallas Cowboys, who were fighting for their playoff lives. The Eagles marched out to a 21-0 lead early in the second quarter, but the Cowboys' defense silenced Philadelphia the rest of the way as the Cowboys began to mount a comeback. The Cowboys scored 24 unanswered points and won, 24–21.

== Season-by-season results ==
Dallas Cowboys vs. Philadelphia Eagles Season-by-Season Results
1960s (Eagles, 10–9)

Season	Season series	at Dallas Cowboys	at Philadelphia Eagles	Overall series	Notes
1960	Eagles 1–0	Eagles; 27–25	no game	Eagles; 1–0	Cowboys join the National Football League (NFL) as an expansion team. They are placed in the NFL Western Conference. Eagles win 1960 NFL Championship.
1961	Eagles 2–0	Eagles; 43–17	Eagles; 35–13	Eagles; 3–0	Due to the Minnesota Vikings joining the NFL, Cowboys are moved to the NFL Eastern Conference, resulting in two annual meetings with the Eagles.
1962	Tie 1–1	Cowboys; 41–19	Eagles; 28–14	Eagles; 4–1	
1963	Tie 1–1	Cowboys; 27–20	Eagles; 24–21	Eagles; 5–2	Eagles' win is their only home win in the 1963 season.
1964	Eagles 2–0	Eagles; 17–14	Eagles; 24–14	Eagles; 7–2	
1965	Tie 1–1	Eagles; 35–24	Cowboys; 21–19	Eagles; 8–3	
1966	Tie 1–1	Cowboys; 56–7	Eagles; 24–23	Eagles; 9–4	In Dallas, Cowboys record their largest victory against the Eagles with a 49–point differential and score their most points in a game against the Eagles. They also finished with 652 total yards, setting a franchise record for most yards in a game. Cowboys lose 1966 NFL Championship.
1967	Tie 1–1	Cowboys; 38–17	Eagles; 21–14	Eagles; 10–5	As a result of expansion, the two eight-team divisions became two eight-team conferences split into two divisions, with the Cowboys and Eagles placed in the NFL Capitol division. Cowboys lose 1967 NFL Championship.
1968	Cowboys 2–0	Cowboys; 34–14	Cowboys; 45–13	Eagles; 10–7	
1969	Cowboys 2–0	Cowboys; 49–14	Cowboys; 38–7	Eagles; 10–9	

1970s (Cowboys, 17–3)

Season	Season series	at Dallas Cowboys	at Philadelphia Eagles	Overall series	Notes
1970	Cowboys 2–0	Cowboys; 21–17	Cowboys; 17–7	Cowboys; 11–10	As a result of the AFL–NFL merger, the Cowboys and Eagles were placed in the newly formed National Football Conference (NFC) and the NFC East. Last matchup at Cotton Bowl and Franklin Field. Cowboys lose Super Bowl V.
1971	Cowboys 2–0	Cowboys; 20–7	Cowboys; 42–7	Cowboys; 13–10	Eagles open Veterans Stadium; Cowboys provide opposition for first regular season game. Cowboys open Texas Stadium midway through the season, with game vs. Eagles being the second in the facility. Cowboys win Super Bowl VI.
1972	Cowboys 2–0	Cowboys; 28–6	Cowboys; 28–7	Cowboys; 15–10	Cowboys win 11 straight meetings (1967–1972).
1973	Tie 1–1	Cowboys; 31–10	Eagles; 30–16	Cowboys; 16–11	
1974	Tie 1–1	Cowboys; 31–24	Eagles; 13–10	Cowboys; 17–12	Game in Philadelphia is first meeting on Monday Night Football. Joe Lavender returns a fumble 96 yards for the Eagles' lone touchdown, and Tom Dempsey kicks game-winning 45-yard field goal on final play.
1975	Cowboys 2–0	Cowboys; 27–17	Cowboys; 20–17	Cowboys; 19–12	Cowboys lose Super Bowl X.
1976	Cowboys 2–0	Cowboys; 27–7	Cowboys; 26–7	Cowboys; 21–12	
1977	Cowboys 2–0	Cowboys; 24–14	Cowboys; 16–10	Cowboys; 23–12	Cowboys win Super Bowl XII.
1978	Cowboys 2–0	Cowboys; 14–7	Cowboys; 31–13	Cowboys; 25–12	Cowboys win 9 straight meetings (1974–1978) and 13 straight home meetings (1966–1978). Cowboys lose Super Bowl XIII.
1979	Tie 1–1	Eagles; 31–21	Cowboys; 24–17	Cowboys; 26–13	Both teams finish with 11–5 records, but the Cowboys clinch the NFC East based on a better conference record.

1980s (Tie, 10–10)

Season	Season series	at Dallas Cowboys	at Philadelphia Eagles	Overall series	Notes
1980	Tie 1–1	Cowboys; 35–27	Eagles; 17–10	Cowboys; 27–14	Both teams finish with 12–4 records, but the Eagles clinch the NFC East based on better net points in division games.
1980 Playoffs	Eagles 1–0		Eagles; 20–7	Cowboys; 27–15	First postseason meeting. NFC Championship Game. Eagles go on to lose Super Bowl XV.
1981	Cowboys 2–0	Cowboys; 21–10	Cowboys; 17–14	Cowboys; 29–15	
1982	Eagles 1–0	Eagles; 24–20	canceled	Cowboys; 29–16	Due to the 1982 NFL player strike, the game scheduled in Philadelphia was canceled.
1983	Cowboys 2–0	Cowboys; 37–7	Cowboys; 27–20	Cowboys; 31–16	
1984	Cowboys 2–0	Cowboys; 23–17	Cowboys; 26–10	Cowboys; 33–16	
1985	Tie 1–1	Cowboys; 34–17	Eagles; 16–14	Cowboys; 34–17	
1986	Tie 1–1	Eagles; 23–21	Cowboys; 17–14	Cowboys; 35–18	
1987	Tie 1–1	Cowboys; 41–22	Eagles; 37–20	Cowboys; 36–19	
1988	Eagles 2–0	Eagles; 23–7	Eagles; 24–23	Cowboys; 36–21	In Philadelphia, Eagles overcome a 20–0 deficit. In Dallas, Eagles clinch a playoff berth with their win, and later clinch the NFC East with the Giants' loss, while also completing their first season series sweep against the Cowboys since the 1964 season. Game in Dallas was Tom Landry's final game as Cowboys' head coach.
1989	Eagles 2–0	Eagles; 27–0	Eagles; 20–10	Cowboys; 36–23	Game in Dallas was played on Thanksgiving Day. Both games became known as the Bounty Bowls due to accusations that Eagles coaches had set a bounty to knock out Cowboys players.

1990s (Cowboys, 14–8)

Season	Season series	at Dallas Cowboys	at Philadelphia Eagles	Overall series	Notes
1990	Eagles 2–0	Eagles; 21–20	Eagles; 17–3	Cowboys; 36–25	
1991	Tie 1–1	Eagles; 24–0	Cowboys; 25–13	Cowboys; 37–26	Eagles win 8 straight meetings (1987–1991). In Dallas, Eagles sack Cowboys' quarterback Troy Aikman 11 times, tying a Cowboys' franchise record for their most sacks allowed in a game. Cowboys clinch a playoff berth and eliminate the Eagles from playoff contention with their win.
1992	Tie 1–1	Cowboys; 20–10	Eagles; 31–7	Cowboys; 38–27	
1992 Playoffs	Cowboys 1–0	Cowboys; 34–10		Cowboys; 39–27	Second postseason meeting. NFC Divisional Round. Cowboys go on to win Super Bowl XXVII.
1993	Cowboys 2–0	Cowboys; 23–17	Cowboys; 23–10	Cowboys; 41–27	Cowboys win Super Bowl XXVIII.
1994	Cowboys 2–0	Cowboys; 24–13	Cowboys; 31–19	Cowboys; 43–27	
1995	Tie 1–1	Cowboys; 34–12	Eagles; 20–17	Cowboys; 44–28	Cowboys win 7 straight meetings (1992–95). Eagles' home win comes after the Cowboys failed to convert 4th & 1 twice inside their own 30–yard line.
1995 Playoffs	Cowboys 1–0	Cowboys; 30–11		Cowboys; 45–28	Third postseason meeting. NFC Divisional Round. Cowboys go on to win Super Bowl XXX.
1996	Tie 1–1	Eagles; 31–21	Cowboys; 23–19	Cowboys; 46–29	After their road win, the Eagles went on a 13-game road divisional losing streak. Both teams finish with 10–6 records, but the Cowboys clinch the NFC East based on a better record against common opponents.
1997	Tie 1–1	Cowboys; 21–20	Eagles; 13–12	Cowboys; 47–30	Dallas win came after Eagles' punter Tom Hutton botched a snap on a potential game-winning field goal from short range.
1998	Cowboys 2–0	Cowboys; 13–9	Cowboys; 34–0	Cowboys; 49–30	
1999	Tie 1–1	Cowboys; 20–10	Eagles; 13–10	Cowboys; 50–31	Game in Philadelphia was Cowboys' wide receiver Michael Irvin final career game.

2000s (Eagles, 13–8)

Season	Season series	at Dallas Cowboys	at Philadelphia Eagles	Overall series	Notes
2000	Eagles 2–0	Eagles; 41–14	Eagles; 16–13 (OT)	Cowboys; 50–33	Season opener game in Dallas became known as the "Pickle Juice Game" due to the Eagles' use of pickle juice to keep the team hydrated. With the win, the Eagles snapped their 13-game road divisional losing streak. Eagles' first season series sweep against the Cowboys since the 1990 season.
2001	Eagles 2–0	Eagles; 36–3	Eagles; 40–18	Cowboys; 50–35	
2002	Eagles 2–0	Eagles; 27–3	Eagles; 44–13	Cowboys; 50–37	Last matchup at Veterans Stadium.
2003	Tie 1–1	Cowboys; 23–21	Eagles; 36–10	Cowboys; 51–38	Eagles open Lincoln Financial Field. In Dallas, Cowboys' wide receiver Randal Williams returned an onside kick for a touchdown in the first three seconds of the game, setting an NFL record for the fastest touchdown.
2004	Eagles 2–0	Eagles; 49–21	Eagles; 12–7	Cowboys; 51–40	In Dallas, Eagles score their most points in a game against the Cowboys. In Philadelphia, Eagles swept the NFC East division for the first time in franchise history with their win. Eagles lose Super Bowl XXXIX.
2005	Cowboys 2–0	Cowboys; 33–10	Cowboys; 21–20	Cowboys; 53–40	In Philadelphia, Cowboys overcame a 20–7 fourth quarter deficit.
2006	Eagles 2–0	Eagles; 23–7	Eagles; 38–24	Cowboys; 53–42	Dallas sign former Eagles' wide receiver Terrell Owens. Game in Dallas was played on Christmas Day, and the Eagles clinched a playoff berth while denying the Cowboys from clinching the NFC East with their win.
2007	Tie 1–1	Eagles; 10–6	Cowboys; 38–17	Cowboys; 54–43	
2008	Tie 1–1	Cowboys; 41–37	Eagles; 44–6	Cowboys; 55–44	In Philadelphia, Eagles record their largest victory against the Cowboys with a 38–point differential, clinch the final playoff berth, and eliminate the Cowboys from playoff contention with their win. Last meeting at Texas Stadium.
2009	Cowboys 2–0	Cowboys; 24–0	Cowboys; 20–16	Cowboys; 57–44	Cowboys open Cowboys Stadium (now known as AT&T Stadium). In Dallas, Cowboys clinch the NFC East with their win. Both teams finish with 11–5 records, but the Cowboys clinch the NFC East based on their head-to-head sweep, setting up a playoff matchup at Dallas in the Wild Card Round.
2009 Playoffs	Cowboys 1–0	Cowboys; 34–14		Cowboys; 58–44	Fourth postseason meeting. NFC Wild Card Round. Quarterback Donovan McNabb's last game as the Eagles quarterback.

2010s (Cowboys, 11–9)

Season	Season series	at Dallas Cowboys	at Philadelphia Eagles	Overall series	Notes
2010	Tie 1–1	Eagles; 30–27	Cowboys; 14–13	Cowboys; 59–45	
2011	Eagles 2–0	Eagles; 20–7	Eagles; 34–7	Cowboys; 59–47	
2012	Cowboys 2–0	Cowboys; 38–33	Cowboys; 38–23	Cowboys; 61–47	In Dallas, Cowboys eliminate the Eagles from playoff contention with their win.
2013	Tie 1–1	Eagles; 24–22	Cowboys; 17–3	Cowboys; 62–48	Eagles clinch the NFC East and eliminate the Cowboys from playoff contention with their win.
2014	Tie 1–1	Eagles; 33–10	Cowboys; 38–27	Cowboys; 63–49	Game in Dallas was played on Thanksgiving.
2015	Tie 1–1	Eagles; 33–27 (OT)	Cowboys; 20–10	Cowboys; 64–50	
2016	Tie 1–1	Cowboys; 29–23 (OT)	Eagles; 27–13	Cowboys; 65–51	Cowboys draft quarterback Dak Prescott.
2017	Tie 1–1	Eagles; 37–9	Cowboys; 6–0	Cowboys; 66–52	Eagles win Super Bowl LII.
2018	Cowboys 2–0	Cowboys; 29–23 (OT)	Cowboys; 27–20	Cowboys; 68–52	
2019	Tie 1–1	Cowboys; 37–10	Eagles; 17–9	Cowboys; 69–53	Eagles' win prevented the Cowboys from clinching the NFC East, and the Eagles would clinch the NFC East the following week.

2020s (Cowboys, 7–6)

Season	Season series	at Dallas Cowboys	at Philadelphia Eagles	Overall series	Notes
2020	Tie 1–1	Cowboys; 37–17	Eagles; 23–9	Cowboys; 70–54	Eagles draft QB Jalen Hurts.
2021	Cowboys 2–0	Cowboys; 41–21	Cowboys; 51–26	Cowboys; 72–54	In Philadelphia, Cowboys' quarterback Dak Prescott throws five touchdown passes.
2022	Tie 1–1	Cowboys; 40–34	Eagles; 26–17	Cowboys; 73–55	Both meetings involved the losing team being forced to play under their backup quarterback. Eagles lose Super Bowl LVII.
2023	Tie 1–1	Cowboys; 33–13	Eagles; 28–23	Cowboys; 74–56	
2024	Eagles 2–0	Eagles; 34–6	Eagles; 41–7	Cowboys; 74–58	In Philadelphia, Eagles' running back Saquon Barkley reached the 2,000-yard club and the Eagles clinched the NFC East with their win. Eagles' first season series sweep against the Cowboys since the 2011 season. Eagles win Super Bowl LIX.
2025	Tie 1–1	Cowboys; 24–21	Eagles; 24–20	Cowboys; 75–59	Game in Philadelphia was the NFL Kickoff Game. The game featured an incident in which DT Jalen Carter was ejected just six seconds into the game after spitting on Dak Prescott, as well as a thunderstorm delay that postponed play for over an hour. In Dallas, Cowboys overcame a 21–0 deficit in the second quarter to win the game on a 42-yard field goal by K Brandon Aubrey. The 21-point comeback tied a Cowboys franchise record for largest comeback.
2026	Cowboys 1–0	November 26	Cowboys; 38–21	Cowboys; 76–59	Game in Dallas will take place on Thanksgiving Day.

Summary of Results

Season	Season series	at Dallas Cowboys	at Philadelphia Eagles	Notes
Regular season	Cowboys 73–58	Cowboys 41–25	Eagles 33–32	
Postseason	Cowboys 3–1	Cowboys 3–0	Eagles 1–0	NFC Wild Card: 2009; NFC Divisional: 1992, 1995; NFC Championship: 1980
Regular and postseason	Cowboys 76–59	Cowboys 44–25	Eagles 34–32	

== Players who have played for both teams ==
Name	Position(s)	Time with Cowboys	Time with Eagles
Randall Cunningham	Quarterback	2000	1985–1995
DeMarco Murray	Running back	2011–2014	2015
Sam Baker	Kicker/Punter/Fullback	1962–1963	1964–1969
Tommy McDonald	Wide receiver	1964	1957–1963
Linval Joseph	Defensive tackle	2024	2022
Parris Campbell	Wide receiver	2025–present	2024
Justin Hamilton	Defensive tackle	2019–2021	2017
Jason Peters	Offensive tackle	2022	2009–2020
Michael Bennett	Defensive end	2019	2018
Corey Clement	Running back	2021	2017–2020
Miles Sanders	Running back	2025–present	2019–2022
Mark Sanchez	Quarterback	2016	2014–2015
Herschel Walker	Running back	1986–1989; 1996–1997	1992–1994
Terrell Owens	Wide receiver	2006–2008	2004–2005
Miles Austin	Wide receiver	2006–2013	2015

== Individual leaders ==
Note: Sorted by yards, regular season only. Bold denotes active player.

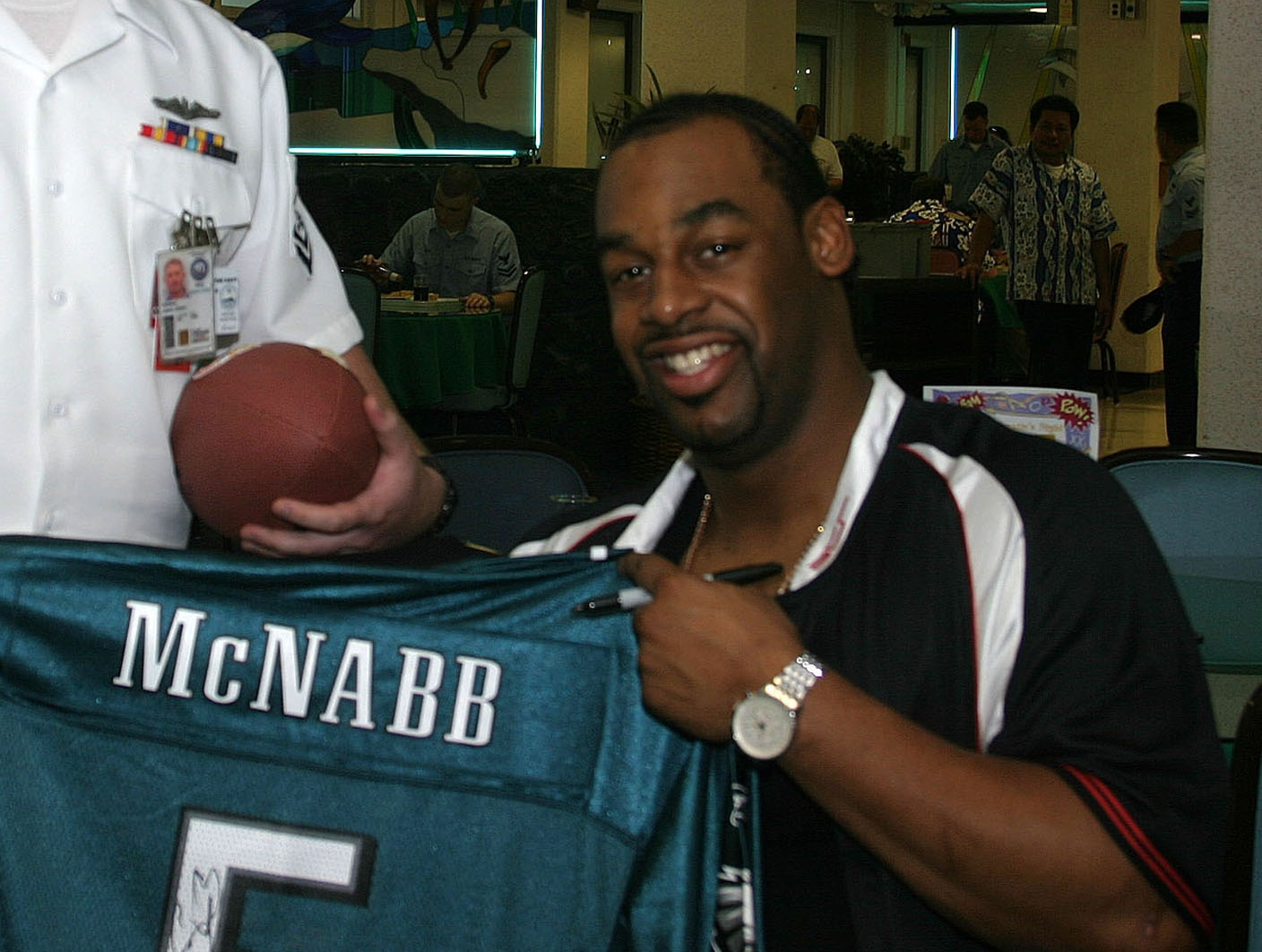
Donovan McNabb has thrown for the most yards and touchdowns in this rivalry.

=== Passing ===
Name	Team	GP	W–L	CMP%	Yds	TD	Int
Donovan McNabb	PHI	19	11–8	61.9	3,951	26	13
Tony Romo	DAL	19	11–8	62.0	3,513	21	15
**Dak Prescott**	**DAL**	**15**	**10–5**	**66.3**	**3,944**	**26**	**9**
Ron Jaworski	PHI	17	4–13	47.3	3,375	19	24
Roger Staubach	DAL	20	17–3	57.9	3,270	17	18

=== Rushing ===
Name	Team	GP	Att	Yds	TD
Emmitt Smith	DAL	26	533	2,466	13
Tony Dorsett	DAL	21	348	1,436	12
Ezekiel Elliott	DAL	15	249	1,160	6
LeSean McCoy	PHI	10	175	918	3
Calvin Hill	DAL	11	181	845	7

=== Receiving ===
Name	Team	GP	Rec	Yds	TD
Jason Witten	DAL	31	158	1,689	8
Bob Hayes	DAL	18	61	1,166	11
Michael Irvin	DAL	20	64	1,047	5
Harold Carmichael	PHI	25	63	992	11
Dez Bryant	DAL	13	64	975	9

== See also ==
- List of NFL rivalries
- NFC East
