= Crume =

Crume is a surname. Notable people with the surname include:

- Eric Crume (born 1993), American football player
- Mary Lincoln Crume (1775–c. 1832), American presidential relative

== See also ==
- Crame, another surname
