= Felix Zwayer =

German football referee

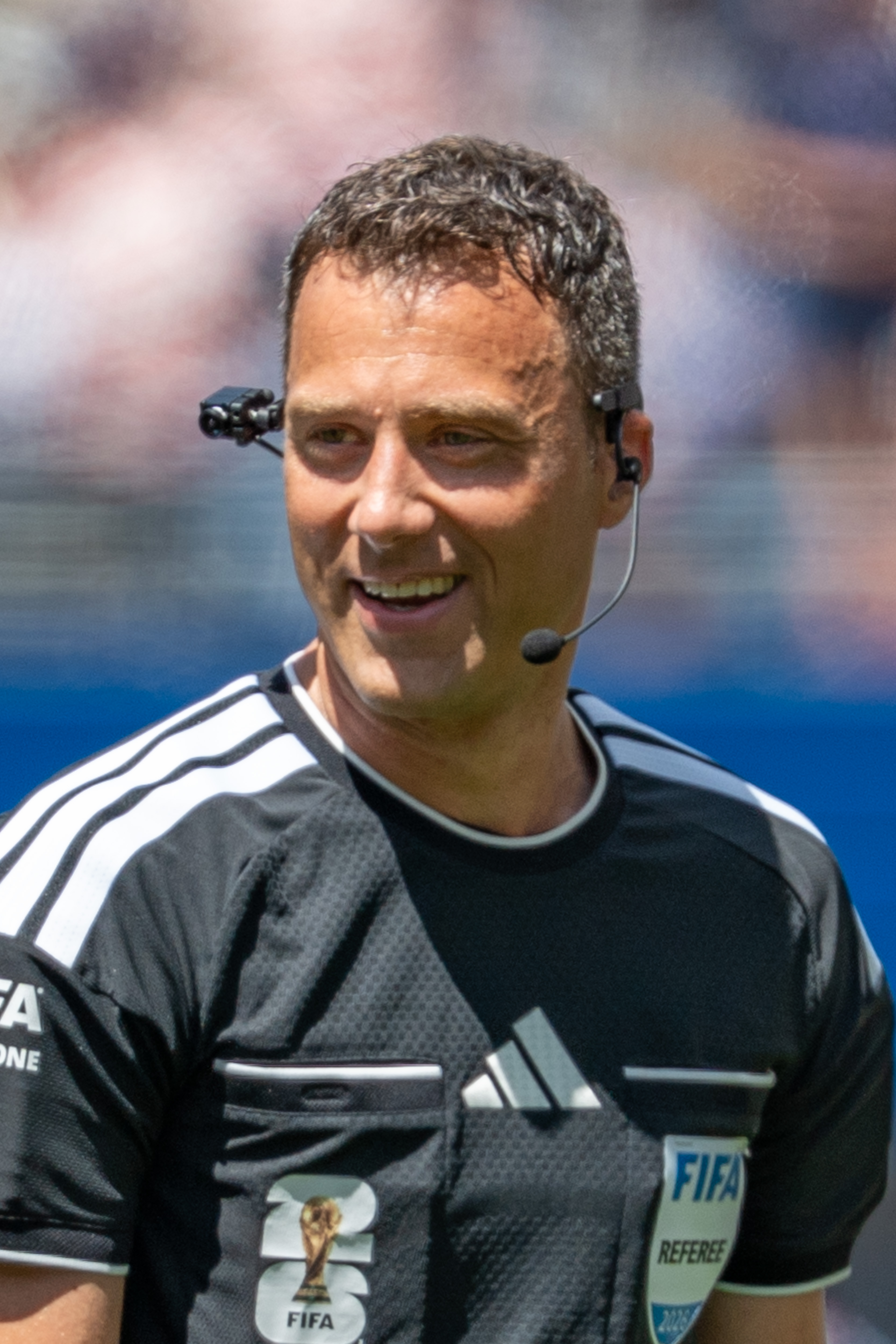
- Zwayer in 2026
- Born: 19 May 1981 (age 45); West Berlin, West Germany
- Other occupation: Real estate broker

Domestic
Years	League	Role
2004–	DFB	Referee
2007–	2. Bundesliga	Referee
2009–	Bundesliga	Referee

International
Years	League	Role
2012–	FIFA listed	Referee

Felix Zwayer (born 19 May 1981) is a German football referee who is based in Berlin. He referees for SC Charlottenburg of the Berlin Football Association.

== Refereeing career ==
Zwayer began officiating on the DFB level in 2004. In 2007, he was promoted to officiate in the 2. Bundesliga, as well as an assistant referee in the Bundesliga. Two years later, Zwayer was promoted to officiate in the Bundesliga for the 2009–10 season.

In 2005, Zwayer was involved in the match fixing scandal which centered around 2. Bundesliga referee Robert Hoyzer, who took bribes to fix several matches which he officiated. Zwayer assisted him in a match and allegedly accepted a bribe of 300 euros to avoid critical scenes for Wuppertaler SV. In January 2005, he and three other high-ranking referees informed the DFB about Hoyzer's match fixing. He was subsequently banned from refereeing for 6 months, a suspension that was kept secret for several years until the German newspaper Die Zeit published a secret file from the German FA.

On 21 February 2016, Bayer Leverkusen manager Roger Schmidt was sent off by Zwayer in a match against Borussia Dortmund after disputing a free kick that led to a goal for Dortmund, the only goal of the game. Schmidt initially refused to leave, causing the referee to suspend the game and lead the players off the field, causing an eight-minute delay, before the game resumed without Schmidt on the field.

On 30 April 2018, Zwayer was selected by FIFA as one of the video assistant referees for the 2018 FIFA World Cup in Russia, the first FIFA World Cup to use the technology.

In December 2021, Zwayer officiated a game between Bayern Munich and Borussia Dortmund in which he was heavily criticised for not giving Dortmund a penalty and sending off coach Marco Rose. After the game, Dortmund's Jude Bellingham made reference to the Zwayer affair, saying: "You give a referee that has match fixed before the biggest game in Germany, what do you expect?"

After the controversy, Zwayer took a break from refereeing. He returned in February 2022 in a 2. Bundesliga game between Hannover 96 and SV Darmstadt, once more receiving criticism for a decision not to give a penalty. His comeback also brought further coverage of his participation in the 2005 match fixing scandal.

On 12th May 2025, UEFA announced that Zwayer would take charge of the all-English 2025 UEFA Europa League Final between Tottenham Hotspur and Manchester United which took place on 21st May 2025 at the San Mamés Stadium in Bilbao.

On 19 June 2026, when Zwayer was officiating the World Cup match between USA and Australia he got muscle cramp during stoppage time. The game was stopped, while assistant referee Katia Itzel García ran on to the pitch with pickle juice as a remedy, in a moment that was later widely shared on social media.

== Personal life ==
Zwayer is a real estate broker and lives in Berlin. He is married with two daughters (born around 2018 and 2021).

== See also ==
- List of football referees

Sporting positions (Germany) Felix Zwayer
Preceded by 2024 (Romania) Istvan Kovacs	2025 UEFA Europa League final Referee	Succeeded by 2026 (France) François Letexier
Preceded by 2021 (England) Anthony Taylor	2023 UEFA Nations League Final Referee	Succeeded by 2025 (Switzerland) Sandro Schärer
