= Crame =

Crame is a surname. Notable people with the surname include:

- Miguel Crame, Filippino footballer
- Naty Crame-Rogers, née Natividad Crame (1922–2021), Filipina actress, drama teacher, writer, producer, and researcher
- Rafael Crame (1863–1927), Filipino constabulary officer

== See also ==
- Crume, another surname
