= Eric Crume =

American football player (born 1993)

Profile
- Position: Defensive tackle

Personal information
- Born: October 18, 1993 (age 33); Detroit, Michigan, U.S.
- Listed height: 6 ft 1 in (1.85 m)
- Listed weight: 302 lb (137 kg)

Career information
- High school: Detroit (MI) Central
- College: Syracuse
- NFL draft: 2015: undrafted

Career history
- Jacksonville Jaguars (2015)*; Green Bay Packers (2015)*; Carolina Panthers (2016–2017)*
- * Offseason or practice squad member only
- Stats at Pro Football Reference

Eric Crume (born October 18, 1993) is an American former football defensive tackle. He played college football at Syracuse.

== Early life ==
Crume attended Central High School in Detroit, Michigan where he graduated in 2011.

== College career ==
Coming out of high school Crume committed to play football at Syracuse University. Crume played as a true freshman and played all four years at Syracuse, playing in 43 games over those four years.

== Professional career ==
=== Jacksonville Jaguars ===
On May 2, 2015, after going undrafted, Crume tweeted that he had signed with the Jacksonville Jaguars. On August 29, 2015 Crume was waived by the Jacksonville Jaguars as part of their roster cuts to get the roster size to 75 players.

=== Green Bay Packers ===
On November 10, 2015, Crume was signed to the Green Bay Packers' practice squad to take the place of Justin Hamilton. On November 17, 2015 Crume was waived from the practice squad to make room for B.J. McBryde.

=== Carolina Panthers ===
On January 6, 2016, Crume signed a futures contract with the Carolina Panthers. On September 3, 2016, he was waived by the Panthers as part of final roster cuts and was signed to the practice squad the next day. After spending the entire season on the practice squad, Crume signed a reserve/future contract with the Panthers on January 2, 2017.

On September 2, 2017, Crume was waived by the Panthers and was signed to the practice squad the next day. He was released on September 14, 2017.
