= Justin Hamilton (defensive lineman) =

American football player (born 1993)

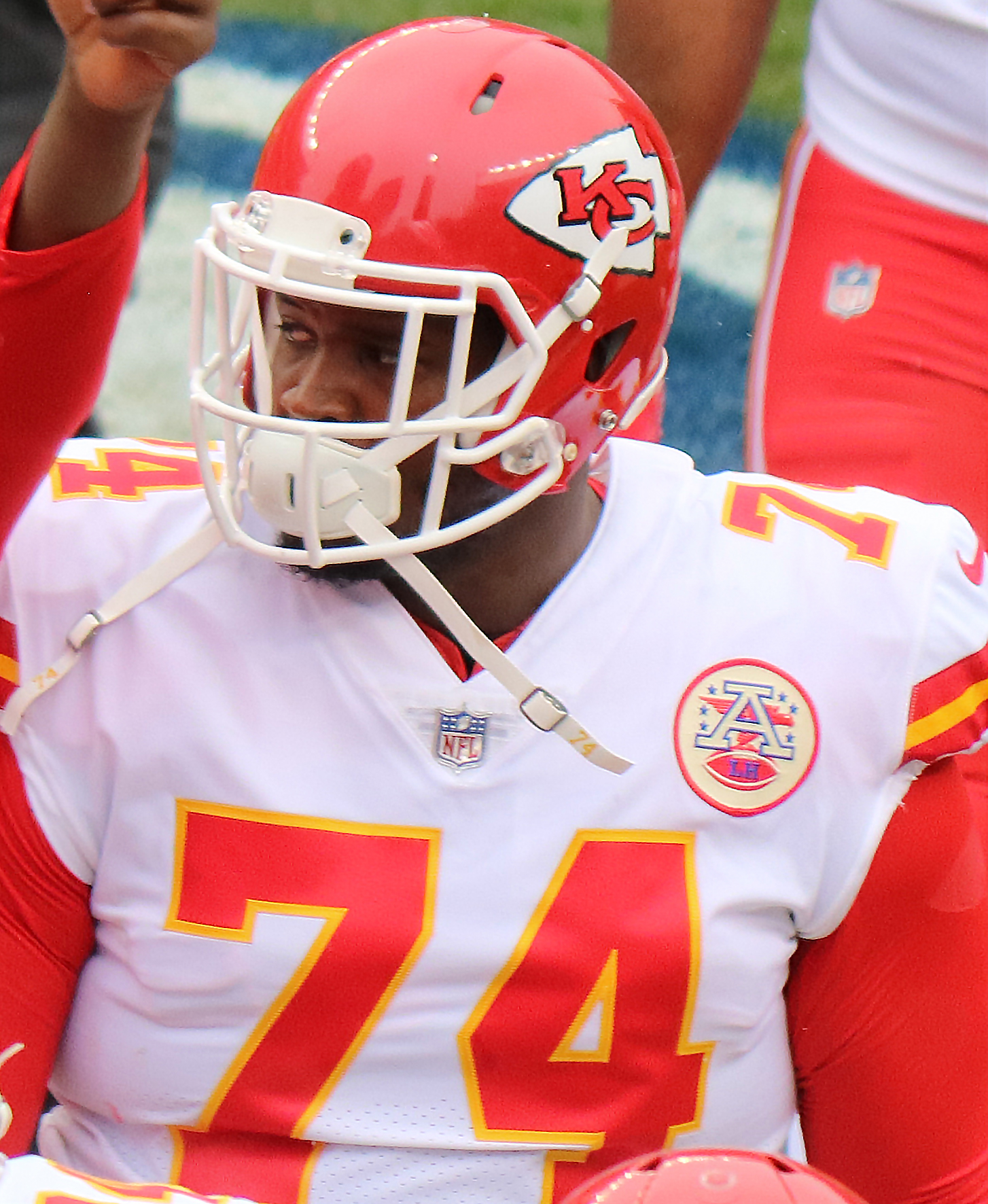
- Hamilton with the Chiefs in 2017

Profile
- Position: Defensive tackle

Personal information
- Born: July 27, 1993 (age 33); Natchez, Mississippi, U.S.
- Listed height: 6 ft 2 in (1.88 m)
- Listed weight: 311 lb (141 kg)

Career information
- High school: Natchez
- College: Louisiana-Lafayette
- NFL draft: 2015: undrafted

Career history
- Buffalo Bills (2015)*; Green Bay Packers (2015)*; Seattle Seahawks (2015–2016); Philadelphia Eagles (2017); Kansas City Chiefs (2017–2018); Dallas Cowboys (2019–2021); Denver Broncos (2021); Washington Commanders (2022)*
- * Offseason or practice squad member only

Awards and highlights
- First-team All-Sun Belt (2014); Second-team All-Sun Belt (2013)

Career NFL statistics
- Total tackles: 23
- Sacks: 0.5
- Stats at Pro Football Reference

Justin Hamilton (born July 27, 1993) is an American professional football defensive tackle. He played college football for the Louisiana Ragin' Cajuns. Hamilton signed with the Green Bay Packers as an undrafted free agent in 2015 and has also been a member of several other NFL teams.

== Early life ==
Hamilton attended Natchez High School in Natchez, Mississippi where he was a two-way tackle. As a junior, he received All-metro honors. As a senior, he tallied 40 tackles, 4 sacks, 4 tackles for loss, 5 quarterback hurries, 2 forced fumbles and one fumble recovery, while receiving All-state honors. He committed to the University of Louisiana at Lafayette.

== College career ==
As a true freshman, he was a backup defensive tackle, making 8 tackles (6 solo) and 2 sacks.

As a sophomore, he started 11 out of 12 games. He was suspended by the Sun Belt Conference for the third game against Oklahoma State University. He came off the bench in the eighth game against the University of Louisiana at Monroe, when the team employed a dime defense. He registered 29 tackles (18 solo), 3 sacks, 8 tackles for loss and 3 forced fumbles.

As a junior, he was slowed by an off-season leg injury and did not regain his full strength until mid-season. He started the last 12 games at nose tackle, collecting 39 tackles (24 solo), 4 sacks, 9 tackles for loss, one forced fumble and one fumble recovery.

As a senior, he posted 27 tackles (23 solo), 5 sacks, 10 tackles for loss and one fumble recovery. He was named first-team All-Sun Belt Conference. He finished his college career after appearing in 51 games, recording 102 tackles (71 solo), 14 sacks, 29 tackles for loss and 4 forced fumbles.

== Professional career ==
Pre-draft measurables
Height	Weight	Arm length	Hand span	Wingspan	40-yard dash	10-yard split	20-yard split	20-yard shuttle	Three-cone drill	Vertical jump	Broad jump	Bench press
6 ft 1 7/8 in (1.88 m)	311 lb (141 kg)	33 1/4 in (0.84 m)	9 1/4 in (0.23 m)	6 ft 8 in (2.03 m)	5.11 s	1.82 s	3.00 s	4.64 s	7.68 s	31.5 in (0.80 m)	8 ft 0 in (2.44 m)	28 reps
All values from Pro Day

=== Buffalo Bills ===
Hamilton was signed as an undrafted free agent by the Buffalo Bills after the 2015 NFL draft on May 3. On August 31, he was waived as part of the Bills trimming their roster to 75.

=== Green Bay Packers ===
On October 26, 2015, Hamilton was signed by the Green Bay Packers to their practice squad. On November 10, he was waived from the practice squad to make room for Eric Crume.

=== Seattle Seahawks ===
On November 17, 2015, Hamilton was signed by the Seattle Seahawks to their practice squad. On November 26, Hamilton was waived by the Seahawks. On December 1, he was re-signed to the Seahawks practice squad. On December 15, Hamilton was again waived by the Seahawks. The following day Hamilton found himself back on the practice squad. On December 22, he was waived from the practice squad. On December 30, the Seahawks signed Hamilton back to the practice squad. On January 19, 2016, Hamilton signed a futures contract with the Seattle Seahawks.

On September 5, 2016, Hamilton was waived by the Seahawks and was signed to the practice squad the next day. On September 13, he was released from the Seahawks' practice squad. He was re-signed to the practice squad on October 25.

=== Philadelphia Eagles ===
On January 23, 2017, Hamilton signed a futures contract with the Eagles. He was waived on September 2, and was signed to the Eagles' practice squad the next day. He was released on September 16, but was re-signed two days later. He was promoted to the active roster on September 30. He made his NFL debut in the fourth game against the San Diego Chargers. He appeared in 3 games, tallying 2 tackles and 0.5 sacks. He was waived by the Eagles on November 1, and re-signed to the practice squad.

=== Kansas City Chiefs ===
On December 7, 2017, Hamilton was signed by the Kansas City Chiefs off the Eagles' practice squad. He started in the season finale against the Denver Broncos.

In 2018, he was declared inactive in 12 games. He appeared in the last 4 contests as a backup. On August 31, 2019, Hamilton was released by the Chiefs.

=== Dallas Cowboys ===
On October 16, 2019, Hamilton was signed by the Dallas Cowboys to replace an injured Tyrone Crawford. On October 25, he was released after the team obtained defensive end Michael Bennett in a trade. He signed a reserve/future contract with the Cowboys on January 21, 2020.

On September 5, 2020, Hamilton was waived by the Cowboys and signed to the practice squad the next day. On October 19, he was promoted to the active roster to replace an injured Trysten Hill. He was placed on the reserve/COVID-19 list by the team on January 1, 2021, and activated on February 1, 2021.

On August 31, 2021, Hamilton was released by the Cowboys and re-signed to the practice squad the next day. He was promoted to the active roster on November 6, to provide depth at defensive tackle while Neville Gallimore was out with an elbow injury. He was waived on December 11 and re-signed to the practice squad. He was promoted to the active roster on December 18, to provide depth after defensive tackles Hill and Osa Odighizuwa were placed on the Reserve/COVID-19 list.

=== Denver Broncos ===
On December 28, 2021, Hamilton was signed by the Denver Broncos off the Cowboys practice squad.

=== Washington Commanders ===
Hamilton signed with the Washington Commanders on June 14, 2022. He was released on August 30.

== Personal life ==
Hamilton was born to Michael and Clementine Hamilton, and is the youngest of four siblings. He married Jasmine Davis and they have one daughter and one son together.
