= Pickle Juice Game =

2000 American football game

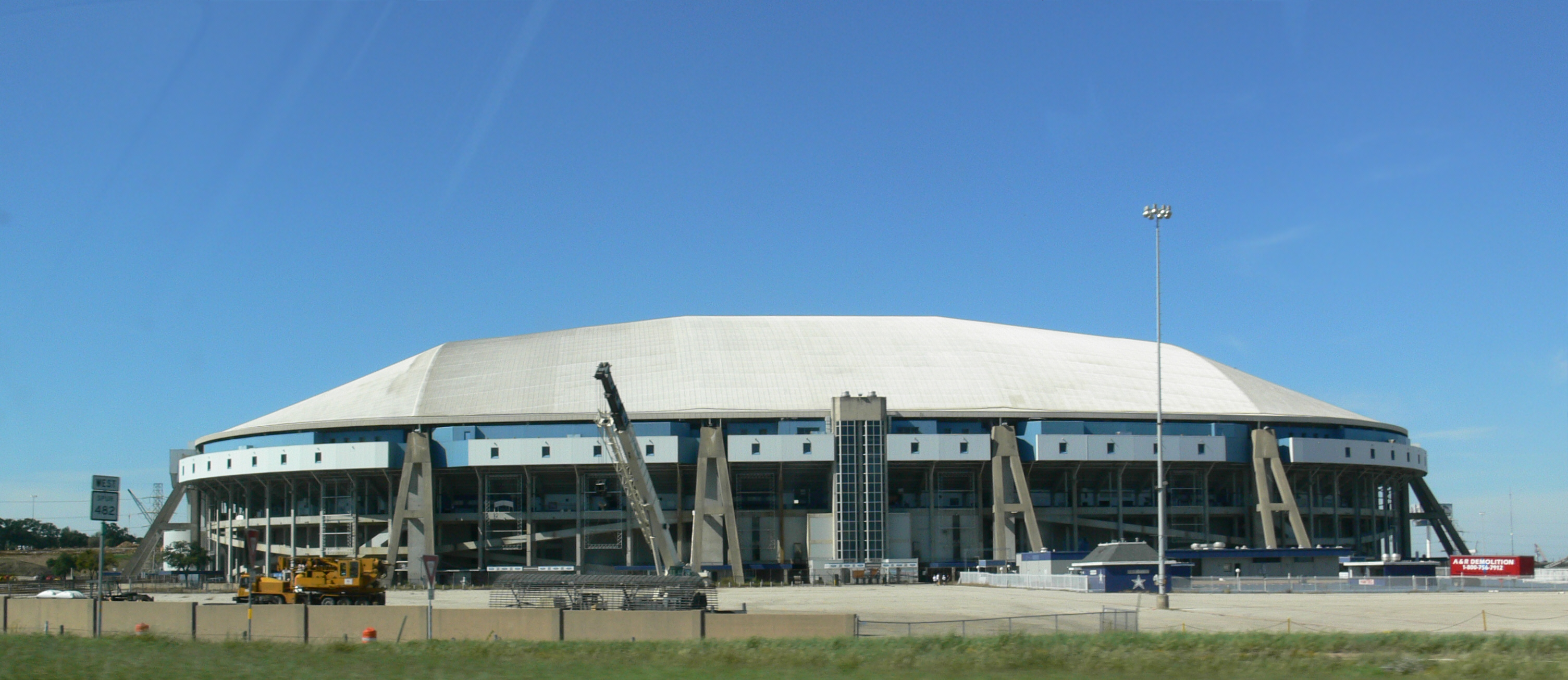
- Texas Stadium, the site of the game.
| Philadelphia Eagles (0–0) | Dallas Cowboys (0–0) |
|---|---|
| 41 | 14 |
| Head coach: Andy Reid | Head coach: Dave Campo |
| | 1 | 2 | 3 | 4 | Total |
|---|---|---|---|---|---|
| PHI | 14 | 10 | 3 | 14 | 41 |
| DAL | 0 | 6 | 8 | 0 | 14 |
- Date: September 3, 2000
- Stadium: Texas Stadium; Irving, Texas
- Favorite: Dallas by 6
- Referee: Tom White
- Attendance: 62,872

TV in the United States
- Network: Fox
- Announcers: Pat Summerall and John Madden

The Pickle Juice Game was a National Football League matchup between the Dallas Cowboys and the Philadelphia Eagles played in such extreme heat that Eagles players drank large quantities of pickle juice to prevent or relieve muscle cramps. The Eagles won 41–14, with running back Duce Staley rushing for 201 yards and the Eagles defense holding the Cowboys to 167 yards.

The September 3, 2000 game was played in Texas Stadium on a Sunday afternoon when temperatures in the area reached 109 degrees Fahrenheit. The on-field temperature was reported to be 130 to 171. The Weather Channel ranked it No. 6 on a list of the NFL’s most weather-impacted games.

Dallas was in the midst of a heat wave, with the temperature reaching a record 109 the day before the game. That night, Eagles trainer Rick Burkholder called head coach Andy Reid to suggest that players shorten their pregame drills to save energy. Reid agreed.

Many Eagles players had been drinking the juice since they started training camp a few weeks earlier and consumed a lot to cope with the Texas heat. "We loaded them up last night, before the game and during the game," Burkholder said. "We don't know why it works, but we only had one cramp."

Reid praised Burkholder for providing it and said, “I was just hoping that the players didn't get sick on it."

The juice is widely used by athletes before and during competition. Studies have found that it is effective. Eagles safety Brian Dawkins said, “I know it helped me. I'm a crampee. I cramp up all the time. I didn't have a single cramp today.”

The Pickle Juice Game was the hottest in the history of the NFL.

== Box Score ==
Philadelphia Eagles vs. Dallas Cowboys– Game summary

| Quarter | 1 | 2 | 3 | 4 | Total |
|---|---|---|---|---|---|
| Eagles | 14 | 10 | 3 | 14 | 41 |
| Cowboys | 0 | 6 | 8 | 0 | 14 |

at Texas Stadium, Irving, Texas

- Date: September 3, 2000
- Game time: 3:05 p.m. CST/4:05 p.m. EST
- Game weather: Clear, 107 °F (42 °C)
- Game attendance: 62,872
- Referee: Tom White
- TV announcers (Fox): Pat Summerall and John Madden

Game information

First quarter

- PHI - Jeff Thomason 1 yard pass from Donovan McNabb (David Akers kick), 10:59.
- PHI- Duce Staley 1 yard rush (David Akers kick), 0:02

Second quarter

- PHI - Jeremiah Trotter 27 yard interception return (David Akers kick)
- PHI - David Akers 33 yard field goal, 6:23.
- DAL - Tim Seder 34 yard field goal, 2:53.
- DAL - Tim Seder 38 yard field goal, 0:00

Third quarter

- PHI - David Akers 37 yard field goal, 6:30.

Fourth quarter

- PHI - Donovan McNabb 3 yard rush (David Akers kick), 14:56.
- PHI - Brian Mitchell 6 yard rush (David Akers kick), 12:22.
- DAL - Joey Galloway 4 yard pass from Randall Cunningham (Rocket Ismail pass from Randall Cunningham), 6:45.

Top passers

- PHI – Donovan McNabb – 16/28, 130 yards, 1 TD, 2 INT
- DAL – Randall Cunningham – 13/26, 135 yards, 1 TD, 1 INT

Top rushers

- PHI – Duce Staley – 26 rushes, 201 yards, TD
- DAL – Rocket Ismail – 2 rushes, 33 yards

Top receivers

- PHI – Duce Staley – 4 receptions, 61 yards
- DAL – Joey Galloway – 4 receptions, 6 yards, TD

== Starting lineups ==
Hall of Fame‡

| Philadelphia | Position | | Dallas |
|---|---|---|---|
OFFENSE
| Torrance Small | WR | | Joey Galloway |
| Tra Thomas | LT | | Flozell Adams |
| John Welbourn | LG | | Larry Allen‡ |
| Bubba Miller | C | | Mark Stepnoski |
| Jermane Mayberry | RG | | Solomon Page |
| Jon Runyan | RT | | Erik Williams |
| Chad Lewis | TE | | Jackie Harris |
| Charles Johnson | WR | | Rocket Ismail |
| Donovan McNabb | QB | | Troy Aikman‡ |
| Duce Staley | RB | | Emmitt Smith‡ |
| Cecil Martin | FB | | Robert Thomas |
DEFENSE
| Mike Mamula | LE | | Ebenezer Ekuban |
| Hollis Thomas | LDT | | Alonzo Spellman |
| Corey Simon | RDT | | Chad Hennings |
| Hugh Douglas | RE | | Greg Ellis |
| Mike Caldwell | WLB | | Dexter Coakley |
| Jeremiah Trotter | MLB | | Dat Nguyen |
| Al Harris | DB | SLB | Darren Hambrick |
| Troy Vincent | LCB | | Kareem Larrimore |
| Bobby Taylor | RCB | | Ryan McNeil |
| Damon Moore | SS | | Darren Woodson |
| Brian Dawkins‡ | FS | | George Teague |

== Officials ==
- Referee: Tom White
- Umpire: Jim Quirk
- Down judge: Ed Camp
- Line judge: Gary Arthur
- Field judge: Boris Cheek
- Side judge: Tommy Moore
- Back judge: Bob Waggoner
