= Pickle juice =

Beverage sometimes used for muscle cramps

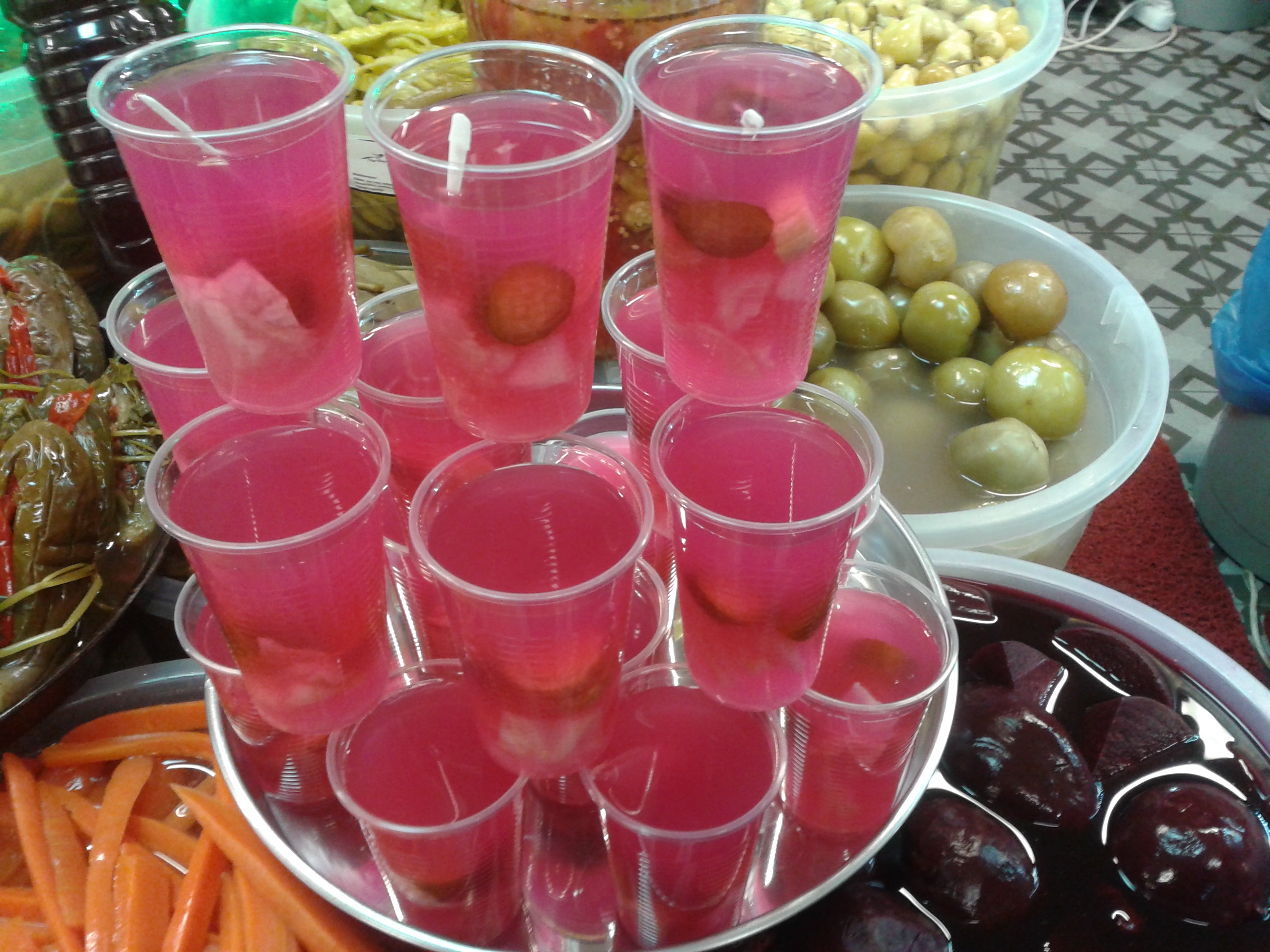
Pickle juice in Ankara, Turkey.

Pickle juice is a mixture of water, vinegar, salt, and spices that is used to preserve food by pickling. It is often consumed by athletes to prevent or relieve muscle cramps.

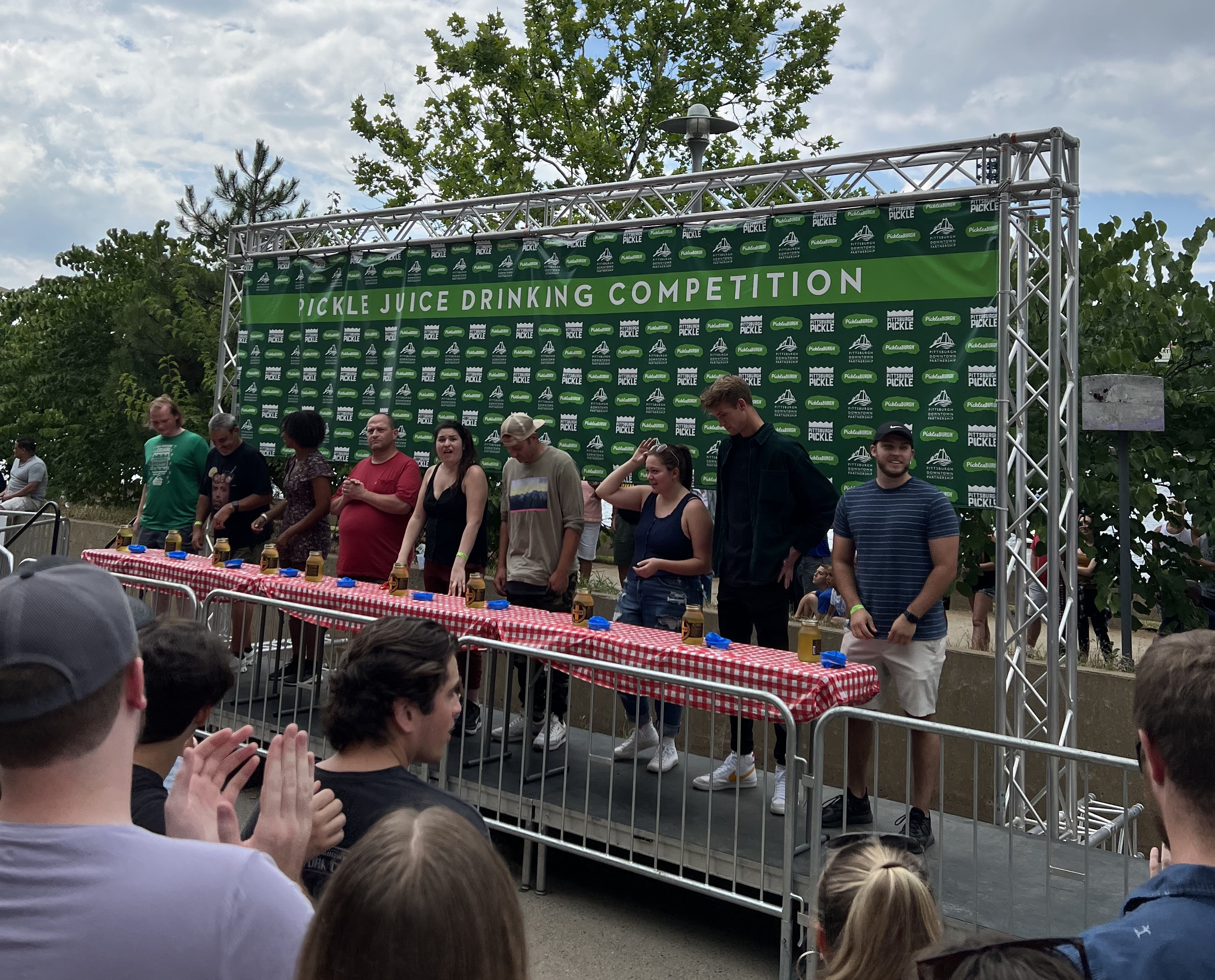
Contestants prepare for the Pickle Juice Drinking Competition at Picklesburgh 2022.

The juice has been used by athletes in sports such as gridiron football, soccer, tennis, and ice hockey. NFL running back Rico Dowdle said he drank "five pickle juices" during a 2025 Carolina Panthers' game to relieve his cramps. Players for Brigham Young University reported that they consumed two and half gallons of pickle juice during a warm game in 2000 when they overcame a 21-point deficit to defeat the University of Virginia.

A 2026 World Cup soccer match between the United States and Australia was paused when referee Felix Zwayer fell to the field in pain after he was overcome by muscle cramps. He drank a small bottle of pickle juice and then got up and resumed the game.

Players drank so much juice in a 2000 NFL matchup between the Philadelphia Eagles and the Dallas Cowboys that it was dubbed the "Pickle Juice Game". In 109 °F (43 °C) heat, Eagles players drank it from water bottles and beat the Cowboys 41-14.

Blake Coleman, a forward for the New Jersey Devils hockey team, uses it to prevent cramps. "I really tried everything to figure out my cramps, but that's just the one thing that really works." Others wait until they have cramps.

It also is a popular beverage in Turkey where it is consumed at social events and as a hangover remedy. The Turkish version is red because it often includes brine from pickled beets or red carrots.

Athletes have said pickle juice is not particularly tasty. San Francisco 49ers cornerback Eli Apple said, "It's nasty, yeah. But it works."

In a 2008 survey, 25% of athletic trainers said that they provide athletes with pickle juice to relieve cramps and 19% said they use it to prevent them.

A study at Brigham Young University in 2008 found the juice is effective. The study found pickle juice had relieved a cramp 45 percent faster than if no fluids were offered and about 37 percent faster than water. Another 2008 study titled "Pickle Juice Intervention for Cirrhotic Cramps Reduction" found that sips of pickle brine reduced the severity of cramps without side effects.

Scientists are unsure why the juice is helpful at reducing cramps. Researchers say the juice's acidity may send signals to the nervous system that stop the cramp. Sports nutritionist Nicole Lund said the pickle juice is "telling those really overexcited nerves to kind of quiet down."

Pickle juice is sold and served in a variety of containers and blends. Coleman, the hockey player, was seen drinking it straight from a pickle jar. Athletes more often use small containers known as "pickle juice shooters." Restaurants and bars also offer "pickleback shots" – whiskey followed by pickle juice chaser. Consumers also blend the juice with lemonade and garnish it with a pickle spear.

== See also ==
- Pickle Juice Game
- List of pickled foods
- Murături
- Relish
